= List of LGBTQ writers =

This list of LGBTQ writers includes writers who are lesbian, gay, bisexual, transgender or queer or otherwise non-heterosexual, non-heteroromantic or non-cisgender who have written about LGBTQ themes, elements or about LGBTQ issues. Works of these authors are part of LGBT literature.

As this list includes writers from antiquity until the present, it is clearly understood that the term "LGBTQ" may not ideally describe the identity of all authors, particularly for those who wrote before the nineteenth century. In some cases, it is more useful to consider such authors as persons who expressed attractions for persons of the same sex (for example, Sappho or Plato), and avoid the anachronistic use of contemporary labels. Inclusion in this list follows general scholarly and academic norms, specified in references, that attempt to establish a genealogy or history of LGBTQ literature written by LGBTQ people. There are many additional non-LGBTQ authors who have written works on LGBTQ topics. All new additions to this list should include a reference.

== A ==
Name	Lifetime	Nationality	Genre	Notable works	References
Caio Fernando Abreu	1948–1996	Brazilian	short stories, plays	Morangos Mofados, dragões não conhecem o paraíso	
Barry D. Adam	b. 1952	Canadian	scholar	The Rise of a Gay and Lesbian Movement, The Global Emergence of Gay and Lesbian Politics	
Evan Adams	b. 1966	Canadian	playwright	Dreams of Sheep, Snapshots, Dirty Dog River and Janice's Christmas	
Nathan Niigan Noodin Adler	b. ?	Canadian	horror	Wrist, Ghost Lake	
Etel Adnan	1925–2021	Lebanese-American	poet	Sea and Fog	
Will Aitken	b. ?	American-Canadian	novelist, film critic	Terre Haute, Realia	
Magaly Alabau	b. 1945	Cuban American	poetry	Electra y Clitemnestra. Poema	
Francisco X. Alarcón	1954–2016	Chicano	poetry	From the Belly Button of the Moon: And Other Summer Poems, Poems to Dream Together = Poemas para soñar juntos	
Edward Albee	1928–2016	American	playwright	Who's Afraid of Virginia Woolf?	
Becky Albertalli	1982	American	young adult fiction	Simon vs. the Homo Sapiens Agenda, What If It's Us	
Jonathan Alexander	b. 1967	American	creative nonfiction	Dear Queer Self	
Mohamed Abdulkarim Ali	b. 1985	Canadian	memoirist	Angry Queer Somali Boy	
Sandra Alland	b. 1973	Canadian	poetry, fiction	The Mathematics of Love	
Kimball Allen	b. 1982	American	playwright, performer, gay activist	Secrets of a Gay Mormon Felon, Be Happy Be Mormon	
Paula Gunn Allen	1939–2008	Native American	poet, literary critic	As Long as the Rivers Flow: The Stories of Nine Native Americans	
Dorothy Allison	b. 1949	American	novelist	Bastard Out of Carolina	
Kye Allums	b. 1989	American	poet	Who Am I?	
Anne-Marie Alonzo	1951–2005	Canadian	poetry, fiction, drama	Bleus de mine	
Rebecca Alpert	b. 1950	American	professor of Jewish American religious history	Lesbian Rabbis: The First Generation	
Hilton Als	b. 1960	American	writer, theatre critic	White Girls	
Lisa Alther	b. 1944	American	novelist	Stormy Weather & Other Stories; Blood Feud: The Hatfields and the McCoys: The Epic Story of Murder and Vengeance; Washed in the Blood; Kinflicks: A Novel	
Noel Alumit	b. 1968	Filipino-American	playwright, novelist	Mr. and Mrs. La Questa Go Dancing, Letters to Montgomery Clift	
Hans Christian Andersen	1805–1875	Danish	fantasy, novelist, poet, playwright	The Emperor's New Clothes, The Little Mermaid, The Snow Queen	
Debra Anderson	b. ?	Canadian	novelist, playwright	Code White	
Gordon Stewart Anderson	1958–1991	Canadian	novelist	The Toronto You Are Leaving	
Patrick Anderson	1915–1979	English/Canadian	poet	Return to Canada	
Albalucía Angel	b. 1939	Colombian	folksinger and novelist	Girasoles en Invierno	
Vincent Anioke	b. ?	Nigerian-Canadian	novelist, short stories	Whirlwind of Metamorphosis, Perfect Little Angels	
Núria Añó	b. 1973	Spanish	novelist	Lowering Clouds	
Trey Anthony	b. 1983	Canadian	playwright	Da Kink in My Hair	
Salvatore Antonio	b. 1976	Canadian	playwright	In Gabriel's Kitchen	
Gloria Anzaldúa	1942–2004	Chicana	scholar of Chicana cultural theory	Borderlands/La Frontera: The New Mestiza	
Bert Archer	b. 1968	Canadian	journalist, critic	The End of Gay (and the death of heterosexuality)	
Reinaldo Arenas	1943–1990	Cuban	poet, novelist and playwright	Before Night Falls	
Rafael Arévalo Martínez	1884–1975	Guatemalan	novelist, short-story writer, poet	Las rosas de Engaddi	
Julia Armfield	b. 1990	English	novelist	Our Wives Under the Sea	
Lawrence Aronovitch	b. 1974	Canadian	playwright	The Lavender Railroad, Galatea	
Rane Arroyo	1954–2010	Puerto Rican	poetry	Pale Ramón	
Yolanda Arroyo Pizarro	b. 1970	Puerto Rican	novel, short story, essay	TRANScaribeñx, Las Negras	
John Ashbery	1927–2017	American	poetry	Self-Portrait in a Convex Mirror	
Rob Astbury	1948-2017	Australian	sports		
Damien Atkins	b. 1975	Canadian	playwright	Real Live Girl, Lucy, The Gay Heritage Project	
Gwen Aube	b. ?	Canadian	poet	Missed Connections with Tall Girls	
W. H. Auden	1907–1973	English	poetry	"Funeral Blues" (poem)	
Emily Austin	b. ?	Canadian	novelist, poet	Everyone in This Room Will Someday Be Dead, Interesting Facts About Space, Gay Girl Prayers	
Ellis Avery	1972–2019	American	novelist	The Teahouse Fire, The Last Nude	
Makram Ayache	b. ?	Lebanese/Canadian	playwright	Harun, The Green Line, The Hooves Belonged to the Deer	
Manuel Azaña	1880–1940	Spanish	intellectual and politician	La velada en Benicarló	

== B ==
Name	Lifetime	Nationality	Genre	Notable works	References
Cheryl B	1972–2011	American	poet, autobiographer	My Awesome Place: The Autobiography of Cheryl B	
Mette Bach	b. ?	Canadian	author, teacher, screenwriter, and director	Off the Highway	
Sir Francis Bacon	1561–1626	English	essayist, novelist	The Advancement and Proficience of Learning Divine and Human (1605)	
Bruce Bagemihl	b. ?	Canadian	scientist	Biological Exuberance: Animal Homosexuality and Natural Diversity	
Valérie Bah	b. ?	Canadian	novelist, short stories	Subterrane, The Rage Letters	
Zaiba Baig	b. 1995	Canadian	playwright, actor	Acha Bacha	
James Robert Baker	1946–1997	American	novelist	Boy Wonder, Tim and Pete	
John Roman Baker	b. 1944	English	poet, playwright, novelist	Crying Celibate Tears	
James Baldwin	1924–1987	American	poet, playwright, novelist, essayist	Go Tell It on the Mountain, Giovanni's Room, If Beale Street Could Talk	
Honoré de Balzac	1799–1850	French	novelist	La Comédie humaine	
Victor J. Banis	1937–2019	American	novelist	The Man from C.A.M.P.	
Keith Banner	b. ?	American	novelist, short stories	The Life I Lead, Next to Nothing	
Kaushalya Bannerji	b. ?	Canadian	poet	A New Remembrance: Poems	
Ann Bannon	b. 1932	American	novelist	Beebo Brinker	
Porfirio Barba Jacob	1883–1942	Columbian	poet	"Canción de la vida profunda" (poem)	
Clive Barker	1952	English	novelist	The Hellbound Heart (novella), Cabal (novel)	
Sandra Barneda	b. 1975	Spanish	journalist, writer, actress	Antena 3 Noticias	
Djuna Barnes	1892–1982	American	novelist	Ladies Almanack, Nightwood	
Allen Barnett	1955–1991	American	short story writer	The Body and Its Dangers	
Natalie Clifford Barney	1876–1972	American	poet, memoirist	Quelques Portraits-Sonnets de Femmes	
Richard Barnfield	1574–1627	English	poet	The Passionate Pilgrim	
Damian Barr	b. 1976	British	writer, columnist, playwright	Maggie & Me	
Emma Barrandeguy	1914-2006	Argentine	writer, journalist, and playwright	Amor saca amor (1970, play)	
Joelle Barron		Canadian	poet	Ritual Lights	
Drew Barrymore	b. 1975	American	autobiographer	Little Girl Lost	
Roland Barthes	1915–1980	French	semiotician	What Is Literature?	
Neil Bartlett	b. 1958	English	playwright	More Bigger Snacks Now, A Vision of Love Revealed in Sleep, Sarrasine, A Judgement in Stone and Now That It's Morning	
John Barton	b. 1957	Canadian	poet	West of Darkness: Emily Carr, self-portrait (2nd ed.)	
Jean Basile	1932–1992	Canadian	novelist, essayist	La Jument des mongols, Le Grand Khan, Les Voyages d'Irkoutsk	
M.J. Bassett	b. 1953	English	writer, director, producer	Strike Back	
Jaime Bayly	b. 1965	Peruvian	journalist, novelist	No se lo Digas a Nadie	
Sylvia Beach	1887–1962	American	editor, memoirist	founder of Shakespeare and Company	
Thomas Beatie	b. 1976	American		Labor of Love: The Story of One Man's Extraordinary Pregnancy	
William Beckford	1760–1844	English	novelist, travel writer	Vathek	
Aphra Behn	c. 1640–1689	English	dramatist, poet and novelist	Oroonoko	
Kathy Belge	b.?	American	writer, journalist	Lipstick & Dipstick’s Essential Guide to Lesbian Relationships, Queer: The Ultimate LGBTQ Guide for Teens	
Billy-Ray Belcourt	b. ?	Canadian	poet	This Wound Is a World	
Ouissem Belgacem	b. 1988	French	football player, writer	Adieu ma honte	
Gwen Benaway	b. 1987	Canadian	poet	Ceremonies for the Dead, Passage	
Bruce Benderson	b. 1946	American	novelist, essayist	Autobiographie érotique	
Oliver Baez Bendorf	b. 1987	American	poet, writer	Advantages of Being Evergreen	
E. F. Benson	1867–1940	English	novelist	Dodo	
Jeremy Bentham	1748–1832	English	philosopher	An Introduction to the Principles of Morals and Legislation	
Sylvie Bérard	b. 1965	Canada	science fiction	Terre des autres, La Saga d'Illyge	
S. Bear Bergman	b. 1974	American-Canadian	author, poet, playwright, and theater artist	Butch Is A Noun	
Leonard Bernstein	1918–1990	American	composer, conductor, author, music lecturer, and pianist	West Side Story	
Mattilda Bernstein Sycamore	b. ?	American	novelist	The End of San Francisco	
Tess Berry-Hart	b. 1974	British	playwright, novelist and activist	Sochi 2014	
José Bianco	1909–1986	Argentine	essayist, novelist and editor	various works published in the magazine Sur	
Anthony Bidulka	b. 1962	Canadian	novelist	Flight of Aquavit	
Aristide von Bienefeldt	1959–2016	Dutch	novelist	Bekentenissen van een Stamhouder ("Confessions of a Son and Heir")	
Imogen Binnie	b. ?	American	novelist	Nevada	
Brandi Bird	b. ?	Canadian	poet	The All + Flesh	
Elizabeth Bishop	1911–1979	American	poet, short story writer	North and South, Questions of Travel	
Bill Bissett	b. 1939	Canadian	poet	Awake in the Red Dessert (spoken word album)	
Persimmon Blackbridge	b. 1951	Canadian	novelist, non-fiction writer	Sunnybrook, Prozac Highway	
Marie-Claire Blais	1939–2021	Canadian	novelist, playwright	A Season in the Life of Emmanuel, Mad Shadows, Augustino and the Choir of Destruction	
Cassandra Blanchard	b. ?	Canadian	poet	Fresh Pack of Smokes	
Robin Blaser	1925–2009	Canadian	poet	The Collected Books of Jack Spicer (editor)	
Ali Blythe	b. ?	Canadian	poet	Twoism	
Charlie Bondhus	b. 1981	American	poet	All the Heat We Could Carry	
Yolanda Bonnell	b. ?	Canadian	playwright	Bug	
Gregory Bonsignore	b. 1983	American	playwright, librettist, lyricist, TV writer	Atomic, Squad 85	
Walter Borden	b. 1942	Canadian	playwright	Tightrope Time: Ain't Nuthin' More Than Some Itty Bitty Madness Between Twilight and Dawn	
Barrie Jean Borich	b. ?	American	memoirist	My Lesbian Husband, Body Geographic	
Michel Marc Bouchard	b. 1958	Canadian	playwright	Lilies, The Orphan Muses	
Eddy Boudel Tan	b. ?	Canadian	novelist	After Elias, The Rebellious Tide	
Elizabeth Bowen	1899–1973	Irish	novelist	Eva Trout	
Jane Bowles	1917–1973	American	novelist, playwright	Two Serious Ladies	
Paul Bowles	1910–1999	American	novelist, poet, translator	The Sheltering Sky	
John Boyne	b. 1971	Irish	novelist	The Boy in the Striped Pyjamas	
Gilberto Braga	1945–2021	Brazilian	screenwriter	Dancin' Days, Celebridade	
Lawrence Ytzhak Braithwaite	1963–2008	Canadian	novelist	Wigger	
Christopher Bram	b. 1952	American	novelist	Father of Frankenstein	
Dionne Brand	b. 1953	Canadian	novelist, poet	Land to Light On, What We All Long For, Sans Souci	
Ken Brand	b. ?	Canadian	playwright	Benchmarks, The Bathhouse Suite, Burying Michael	
Beth Brant	1941–2015	Canadian	poet	A Gathering of Spirit: A Collection by North American Women	
Perry Brass	b. 1947	American	non-fiction, novels, poetry, plays	How to Survive Your Own Gay Life; King of Angels, A Novel About the Genesis of Identity and Belief	
André Brassard	b. 1946	Canadian	stage director, filmmaker and actor	Once Upon a Time in the East, Le soleil se lève en retard (both films)	
Bertolt Brecht	1898–1956	German	playwright	The Threepenny Opera	
Lynn Breedlove	b. 1958	American	novelist	Godspeed	
Phoebe Bridgers	b. 1994	American	singer, songwriter, producer	Punisher, Stranger in the Alps	
Dave Brindle	b. ?	Canadian	journalist		
Poppy Z. Brite	b. 1967	American	novelist	Liquor, Prime, and Soul Kitchen	
Michael Bronski	b. 1949	American	historian	A Queer History of the United States	
KB Brookins	b. 1995	American	poet, creative non-fiction writer	Pretty, Freedom House	
Carellin Brooks	b. ?	Canadian	novelist, non-fiction	One Hundred Days of Rain, Wreck Beach	
Brigid Brophy	1929–1995	English	novelist	Hackenfeller's Ape	
Nicole Brossard	b. 1943	French Canadian	poet, novelist	L'Echo bouge beau	
Olga Broumas	b. 1949	Greek-American	poet	Beginning with O	
Rebecca Brown	b. 1956	American	novelist	The Gifts of the Body	
Rita Mae Brown	b. 1944	American	novelist	Rubyfruit Jungle	
Ryan Buell	b. 1982	American	memoirist	Paranormal State: My Journey into the Unknown	
Michael C. Burgess	b. 1956	British	poet	Blue Rhapsody, The Victims	
Nathan Burgoine	b. ?	Canadian	novelist, short stories	Light	
Ronnie Burkett	b. 1957	Canadian	playwright	Tinka's New Dress	
John Horne Burns	1916–1953	American	novelist	The Gallery	
William S. Burroughs	1914–1997	American	novelist	Naked Lunch, Queer	
Aldo Busi	b. 1948	Italian	novelist	Seminar on Youth	
Alec Butler	b. 1959	Canadian	playwright	Black Friday	
Lady Eleanor Butler	1739–1829	Anglo-Irish	diarist	Ladies of Llangollen: letters and journals of Lady Eleanor Butler (1739–1829) and Sarah Ponsonby (1755–1831)	
Judith Butler	b. 1956	American	philosophy, ethics, queer theory	Gender Trouble (1990)	
Samuel Butler	1835–1902	English	novelist	Erewhon, The Way of All Flesh	
Jake Byrne	b. ?	Canadian	poet	Celebrate Pride with Lockheed Martin, DADDY	
Lord Byron	1788–1824	English	poet	"Don Juan" (poem)	

== C ==
Name	Lifetime	Nationality	Genre	Notable works	References
Patrick Califia	b. 1954	American	non-fiction	Public Sex: The Culture of Radical Sex	
Michael Callen	1955–1993	American	non-fiction	Surviving AIDS	
Kacen Callender	b. 1989	American	novelist	Felix Ever After	
Anne Cameron	b. 1938	Canadian	novelist, poet, screenwriter	Dreamspeaker (screenplay)	
Elspeth Cameron	b. 1943	Canadian	biographies and memoirs, poetry	No Previous Experience	
Rafael Campo	b. 1964	American	poet	"Silence= Death"	
Truman Capote	1924–1984	American	novelist, non-fiction	Breakfast at Tiffany's, In Cold Blood	
Pat Capponi	1949–2020	Canadian	mystery novelist, non-fiction	Bound by Duty: Walking the Beat with Canada's Cops	
Tom Cardamone	b. ?	American	speculative fiction	Green Thumb	
Nancy Cárdenas	1934–1994	Mexican	actor, activist, filmmaker	México de mis amores (documentary)	
Dale Carpenter	b. 1966	American	non-fiction	Flagrant Conduct: The Story of Lawrence v. Texas	
Edward Carpenter	1844–1929	English	poet, academic	Civilisation, Its Cause and Cure	
Michael Carroll	b. ?	American	short stories	Little Reef	
Julián del Casal	1863–1893	Cuban	poet	Mi museo ideal (poetry collection)	
Francisco Casas	1959	Chilean	Writer	Sodoma mía	
Sue-Ellen Case	b. 1942	American	playwright, critic	Butch/Femme: Inside Lesbian Genders	
Joseph Cassara	b. 1989	American	novelist	The House of Impossible Beauties	
Stacie Cassarino	b. 1975	American	poet	Zero at the Bone	
Cyrus Cassells	b.1957	American	poet, professor	More Than Peace and Cypresses	
Clint Catalyst	b. 1971	American	writer, actor	Cottonmouth Kisses	
Willa Cather	1873–1947	American	novels, stort stories and essays	My Ántonia	
Catullus	ca 85–ca 55 B.C.	Roman	poet	Catullus et in eum commentarius	
Constantine P. Cavafy	1863–1933	Greek	poet	"Ithaca" (poem)	
Kate Cayley	b. ?	Canadian	poet, dramatist, short stories	How You Were Born, The Hangman in the Mirror, After Akhmatova	
Luis Cernuda	1902–1963	Spanish	poet	La realidad y el deseo	
Éric Chacour	b. ?	Canadian	novelist	What I Know About You	
Robert Chafe	b. 1971	Canadian	playwright	Afterimage, Butler's Marsh, Tempting Providence (plays)	
Paul Chamberland	b. 1939	Canadian	poet, essayist	L'Afficheur hurle, En nouvelle barbarie	
Becky Chambers	b. 1985	American	writer	The Long Way to a Small, Angry Planet, A Psalm for the Wild-Built	
Jane Chambers	1937–1983	American	playwright	Tales of the Revolution and Other American Fables	
Jessie Chandler	b. 1968	American	mysteries and humorous caper fiction	Shay O'Hanlon Caper series	
Mathieu Chantelois	b. 1973	Canadian	television personality	Lorenzo (1963)	
Graham Chapman	1941–1989	British	Screenwriter	A liar's Autobiography	
George Chauncey	b. 1953	American	historian	Gay New York: Gender, Urban Culture, and the Making of the Gay Male World, 1890–1940	
Normand Chaurette	1954–2022	Canadian	playwright	Fragments d'une lettre d'adieu lus par les géologues, Je vous écris du Caire	
Alexander Chee	b. 1967	American	novelist, poet, journalist	Edinburgh, The Queen of Night	
John Cheever	1912–1982	American	novelist, short stories	The Enormous Radio, The Five-Forty-Eight, The Wapshot Chronicle, The Swimmer	
Kevin Chen	b. 1976	Taiwanese	novelist, journalist, translator	Ghost Town, Florida Metamorphosis	
Chen Xue	b. 1970	Taiwanese	novelist	Book of a Demon, Fatherless City, A Wife's Diary	
Chi Ta-wei	b. 1972	Taiwanese	novelist, literary scholar	The Membranes	
Gabriel Cholette	b. ?	Canadian	memorist	Scenes from the Underground	
Lisa Cholodenko	b. 1964	American	screenwriter	High Art, Laurel Canyon, The Kids Are All Right	
Wayson Choy	1939–2019	Canadian	novelist, memoirist	The Jade Peony, Paper Shadows, All That Matters	
Jillian Christmas	b. ?	Canadian	poet	The Gospel of Breaking	
Rin Chupeco	b. ?	Filipino	novelist	The Girl from the Well, The Bone Witch	
Nino Cipri	b. 1985	American	writer	Defekt	
Hélène Cixous	b. 1937	French	philosopher, writer	"The Laugh of the Medusa" (essay)	
Eli Claire	b. 1963	American	writer	Exile and Pride: Disability, Queerness, and Liberation, Brilliant Imperfection: Grappling with Cure	
C. L. Clark	b. ?	American	novelist	The Unbroken	
John Cleland	1710–1789	English	novelist	Fanny Hill	
Kate Clinton	b. 1947	American	comedian	Don't Get Me Started, What the L; I Told You So	
Jean Cocteau	1889–1963	French	poet, novelist, dramatist	La Voix humaine	
Christopher Coe	1953–1994	American	novelist	I Look Divine, Such Times	
Henri Cole	b. 1956	American	poet	Touch (poetry collection)	
Susan G. Cole	b. 1952	Canadian	writer	Pornography and the sex crisis	
Colette	1873–1954	French	novelist	Claudine series	
Joey Comeau	b. 1980	Canadian	writer	A Softer World, Overqualified, Lockpick Pornography	
Ivy Compton-Burnett	1884–1969	English	writer	Manservant and Maidservant	
Carmen Conde Abellán	1907–1996	Spanish	academic, poet, writer	Poesía ante el tiempo y la inmortalidad	
Timothy Conigrave	1959–1994	Australian	actor, writer	Holding the Man	
Garrard Conley	b. 1984/1985	American	memoirist	Boy Erased: A Memoir	
Bernard Cooper	b. 1951	American	writer	The Bill From My Father: A Memoir	
Dennis Cooper	b. 1953	American	writer	George Miles Cycle	
Copi (pseudonym of Raúl Damonte)	1941–1987	Argentine/French	writer, actor, director, cartoonist	La Femme assise	
Rick Copp	b. 1964	American	mystery writer	The Actor's Guide to Murder, The Actor's Guide to Adultery, The Actor's Guide to Greed, Where the Bears Are	
Steven Corbin	1953–1995	American	novelist	Fragments That Remain	
Amanda Cordner	b. ?	Canadian	playwright	Body So Fluorescent, Wring the Roses	
Jeanne Cordova	1948–2016	American	activist, journalist	When We Were Outlaws: a Memoir of Love and Revolution	
Marie Corelli	1855–1924	Scottish	writer	A Romance of Two Worlds	
Carl Corley	1919–2016	American	writer	A Chosen World	
Alfred Corn	b. 1943	American	poet, novelist, critic		
Brenda Cossman	b. 1960	Canadian	academic	Sexual Citizens: The Legal and Cultural Regulation of Sex and Belonging	
Douglas Coupland	b. 1961	Canadian	novelist, short story writer, playwright	Generation X: Tales for an Accelerated Culture, Microserfs, JPod	
Laerte Coutinho	b. 1951	Brazilian	cartoonist, screenwriter	Chiclete com Banana, Piratas do Tietê	
Dani Couture	b. 1978	Canadian	writer	Sweet (poetry collection)	
Noël Coward	1899–1973	English	playwright	Private Lives	
Daniel Allen Cox	b. 1976	Canadian	writer	Shuck, Krakow Melt	
Ivan Coyote	b. 1969	Canadian	spoken word performer, writer	Tomboy Survival Guide	
Caleb Crain	b. 1967	American	novelist, critic	Necessary Errors, American Sympathy	
Hart Crane	1899–1933	American	poet	The Bridge	
Mark Crawford		Canadian	playwright	The Birds and the Bees, Bed and Breakfast	
Quentin Crisp	1908–1999	British	books, stage, screen, TV	The Naked Civil Servant	
Eva Crocker	b. ?	Canadian	short stories	Barrelling Forward	
Mart Crowley	1935–2020	American	playwright	The Boys in the Band	
Countee Cullen	1903–1946	American	writer	Color (poetry collection)	
Nancy Jo Cullen	b. ?	Canadian	poet, short stories	Science Fiction Saint, Pearl, Untitled Child, and Canary (short story collection)	
Tom Culligan	b. 1945	Canadian	businessman	Teacups & Sticky Buns	
Michael Cunningham	b. 1952	American	novelist	The Hours	
Peter Cureton	1965–1994	Canadian	playwright	Passages	
Max Currie	b. ?	New Zealand	screenwriter, film director	Everything We Loved, Rūrangi	
Jameson Currier	b. 1955	American	novelist, short stories	Dancing on the Moon, Where the Rainbow Ends, The Wolf at the Door	
Jen Currin	b. ?	American/Canadian	poet	The Inquisition Yours	

== D ==
Name	Lifetime	Nationality	Genre	Notable works	References
Henry Wadsworth Longfellow Dana	1881–1950	American	nonfiction writer	Handbook on Soviet Drama, Longfellow and Dickens	
Stormy Daniels	b. 1979	American	autobiographer	Full Disclosure	
Jean-Paul Daoust	b. 1946	Canadian	poet, novelist, short stories	Les Cendres bleues, Black Diva	
Jim David	b. 1954	American	comedian, actor, playwright	South Pathetic	
Christopher Davis	b. 1953	American	novelist, short stories	Valley of the Shadow, Philadelphia	
Jeff Davis	b. 1975	American	screenwriter	Teen Wolf	
Tanya Davis	b. ?	Canadian	poet	Make a List	
Amber Dawn	b. ?	Canadian	novelist	Sub Rosa	
Nicholas Dawson	b. 1982	Chilean-Canadian	novelist, poet, non-fiction	Désormais, ma demeure	
Théophile de Viau	1590–1626	French	poet	Fragment d'une histoire comique	
Samuel R. Delany	b. 1942	American	novelist, literary critic	Hogg, Dhalgren, The Motion of Light in Water, Dark Reflections	
A. M. Dellamonica	b. 1968	Canadian	novelist	Indigo Springs	
David Demchuk	b. ?	Canadian	novelist, playwright	The Bone Mother, Touch, If Betty Should Rise	
Natasha Dennerstein	b. ?	Australian-New Zealander-American	poet, editor	Anatomize, Triptych Caliform, About a Girl, Seahorse	
Nicole Dennis-Benn	b. 1982	Jamaican	novelist	Here Comes the Sun, Patsy	
Joel Derfner	b. 1973	American	memoirist, author, essayist, humorist	Gay Haiku, Swish, Lawfully Wedded Husband	
Augusto d'Halmar	1882–1950	Chilean	novelist	Palabras para canciones	
David Di Giovanni	b. ?	Canadian	playwright	Body So Fluorescent, Wring the Roses	
Andy Dick	b. 1965	American	comedian, actor, musician, and television and film producer	The Ben Stiller Show, NewsRadio, The Andy Dick Show	
Emily Dickinson	1830–1886	American	poet	The Poems of Emily Dickinson	
Michael Dillon	1915–1962	British	poet, autobiographer, nonfiction	Self: A Study in Endocrinology and Ethics, Out of the Ordinary: A Life of Gender and Spiritual Transitions	
Joe DiPietro	b. 1961	American	playwright	Memphis, Fucking Men	
Christopher DiRaddo	b. 1974	Canadian	novelist	The Geography of Pluto, The Family Way	
Thomas Disch	1940–2008	American	novelist, poet	On Wings of Song	
Dorothy Dittrich	b. ?	Canadian	playwright	When We Were Singing, The Dissociates, The Piano Teacher	
Farzana Doctor	b. ?	Canadian	novelist	Six Metres of Pavement	
Dodie	b. 1995	English	novelist, short stories	Secrets for the Mad: Obsessions, Confessions and Life Lessons, Untitled Short Story Collection	
John Donne	1572–1631	English	poet	Notable for his erotic poetry and elegies	
Nisa Donnelly	1950–2021	American	novelist	The Bar Stories: A Novel After All, The Love Songs of Phoenix Bay	
Emma Donoghue	b. 1969	Irish/Canadian	novelist, short story writer	Room	
José Donoso	1925–1996	Chilean	novelist	Hell Has No Limits	
John Donovan	1928–1992	American	young adult novelist, dramatist	I'll Get There. It Better Be Worth the Trip	
Fernand Dorais	1928–2003	Canadian	academic literature, erotica	Entre Montréal ...et Sudbury, Témoins d'errances en Ontario français, Hermaphrodismes	
Mark Doty	b. 1953	American	poet and memoirist	Heaven's Coast, Fire to Fire	
Lord Alfred Douglas	1870–1945	English	poet	Oscar Wilde and Myself	
Norman Douglas	1868–1952	Scottish-Austrian	novelist	Old Calabria	
Michael Downing	1958–2021	American	novelist, non-fiction	Perfect Agreement, Breakfast with Scot	
Brian Drader	b. 1960	Canadian	playwright	Prok, The Fruit Machine, The Norbals	
Neal Drinnan	b. 1964	Australian	novelist	Izzy and Eve	
Daphne du Maurier	1907–1989	English	author, playwright	Rebecca	
Peter Dubé	b. ?	Canadian	novelist, short story writer	editor of several anthologies of gay male literature	
René-Daniel Dubois	b. 1955	Canadian	playwright	Being at Home with Claude	
Carol Ann Duffy	b. 1955	Scottish	poet, playwright	Standing Female Nude	
Maureen Duffy	1933–2026	English	novelist, poet, playwright	That's How It Was	
Stella Duffy	b. 1963	English/New Zealand	novelist	State of Happiness	
Robert Duncan	1919–1988	American	poet	The Opening of the Field, Roots and Branches, and Bending the Bow	
Warren Dunford	b. 1963	Canadian	mystery	Soon to Be a Major Motion Picture, Making a Killing, The Scene Stealer	
Paul Dunn		Canadian	playwright	The Gay Heritage Project, Outside	
Kristyn Dunnion	b. 1969	Canadian	novelist, short story writer	The Dirt Chronicles	
Larry Duplechan	b. 1956	American	novelist	Blackbird, Got 'til It's Gone	
Elana Dykewomon	1949–2022	American	novelist, poet	Beyond the Pale	

== E ==
Name	Lifetime	Nationality	Genre	Notable works	References
Jim Egan	1921–2000	Canadian	activist, journalist	Challenging the Conspiracy of Silence	
Esteban Echeverría	1805–1851	Argentine	fiction erotica writer, liberal activist	"The Slaughter Yard" (1838)	
Guy Édoin	b. ?	Canadian	screenwriter	Wetlands (Marécages)	
Chike Frankie Edozien	b. 1970	Nigerian-American	journalist, memoirist	Lives of Great Men: Living and Loving as an African Gay Man	
Jorge Eduardo Eielson	1924–2006	Peruvian	poetry	Habitación en Roma, El cuerpo de Giulia-No and Primera muerte de María (novels)	
Lars Eighner	1948–2021	American	non-fiction, erotica	Travels with Lizbeth	
Francesca Ekwuyasi	b. ?	Nigerian-Canadian	novelist	Butter Honey Pig Bread	
Bret Easton Ellis	b. 1964	American	novelist	American Psycho, Glamorama	
Deborah Ellis	b. 1960	Canadian	non-fiction, young adult literature	The Breadwinner, The Heaven Shop	
Jason Elis	b. 1971	Australian	radio host	The Jason Elis Show	
Sarah Ellis	b. 1952	Canadian	children's	Odd Man Out, Pick Up Sticks	
Sarah Kate Ellis	b. 1971	American	children's, memoirist	Times Two: Two Women in Love and the Happy Family They Made, All Moms	
Gloria Escomel	b. 1941	Uruguayan-Canadian	novelist, dramatist, journalist	Pièges, Fruit de la passion	
Michael Estok	1939–1989	Canadian	poet	A Plague Year Journal	
Izad Etemadi	b. ?	Canadian	actor, playwright	We Are Not the Others, Let Me Explain	

== F ==
Name	Lifetime	Nationality	Genre	Notable works	References
Evan Fallenberg	b. 1961	American-Israeli	novelist	Light Fell, When We Danced on Water	
Sara Farizan	b. ?	American	young adult literature	If You Could Be Mine	
Logan February	b. 1999	Nigerian	poetry	In the Nude, Mannequin in the Nude	
David B. Feinberg	1956–1994	American	journalist	Queer and Loathing	
Leslie Feinberg	1949–2014	American	novelist, non-fiction	Stone Butch Blues	
Joshua M. Ferguson	b. ?	Canadian	memoirist	Me, Myself, They	
Anderson Ferrell	b. ?	American	novelist	Where She Was, Home for the Day, Have You Heard	
Robert Ferro	1941–1988	American	novelist	The Family of Max Desir	
Hubert Fichte	1935–1986	German	writer	Die Geschichte der Empfindlichkeit	
Edward Field	1924–2026	American	poetry	Counting Myself Lucky, Selected Poems 1963-1992	
Harvey Fierstein	b. 1954	American	playwright	Torch Song Trilogy	
Connie Fife	1961–2017	Canadian	poetry	Beneath the Naked Sun, Poems for a New World	
Timothy Findley	1930–2002	Canadian	novelist, playwright	The Wars, Headhunter, Elizabeth Rex	
Lois Fine	b. ?	Canadian	dramatist	Freda and Jem's Best of the Week	
Larry Fineberg	b. 1945	Canadian	playwright	Eve, Human Remains, Failure of Nerve	
Ronald Firbank	1886–1926	English	novelist	Valmouth, Concerning the Eccentricities of Cardinal Pirelli	
Diane Flacks	b. 1955	Canadian	playwright	Myth Me, By a Thread	
Janet Flanner	1892–1978	American	journalist	foreign correspondent in Paris, France	
Lisa Foad	b. ?	Canadian	short stories	The Night Is a Mouth	
Waawaate Fobister	b. ?	Canadian	playwright	Agokwe	
Michael Thomas Ford	b. 1968	American	novelist, non-fiction	Alec Baldwin Doesn't Love Me, That's Mr. Faggot to You	
E. M. Forster	1879–1970	English	novelist	Maurice, A Passage to India, A Room With A View, Howards End	
Guy Mark Foster	b. ?	American	short stories	The Rest of Us	
Marion Foster	1924–1997	Canadian	mysteries	The Monarchs Are Flying, Legal Tender	
Michel Foucault	1926–1984	French	philosopher	The History of Sexuality	
Brian Francis	b. 1971	Canadian	novelist	Fruit	
Judith Frank	b. ?	American	novelist, short stories	Crybaby Butch, All I Love and Know	
Brad Fraser	b. 1959	Canadian	playwright	Unidentified Human Remains and the True Nature of Love, Poor Super Man	
Mary Eleanor Wilkins Freeman	1852–1930	American	novelist, short story writer, poet	A New England Nun	
Alice French	1850–1934	American	writer	Expiation	
Ladislav Fuks	1923–1994	Czech	novelist	The Cremator	
Janine Fuller	b. 1958	Canadian	non-fiction	Restricted Entry: Censorship on Trial, Forbidden Passages: Writings Banned in Canada	
Wes Funk	1969–2015	Canadian	novelist	Dead Rock Stars, Cherry Blossoms	

== G ==
Name	Lifetime	Nationality	Genre	Notable works	References
Patrick Gale	b. 1962	British	novelist	Rough Music	
Federico García Lorca	1898–1936	Spanish	poet and playwright	Poeta en Nueva York	
Magali García Ramis	b. 1946	Puerto Rican	novelist, essayist	Happy Days, Uncle Sergio	
Gustavo Alvarez Gardeazabal	b. 1945	Colombian	novelist, columnist	Dabeiba	
Nancy Garden	1938–2014	American	novelist	Annie on My Mind	
Ken Garnhum	b. ?	Canadian	playwright	Pants on Fire	
C. E. Gatchalian	b. 1974	Canadian	playwright	Motifs & Repetitions	
Daniel Gawthrop	b. 1963	Canadian	journalist, biographer	Affirmation: The AIDS Odyssey of Dr. Peter, The Rice Queen Diaries, The Trial of Pope Benedict	
Roxane Gay	b. 1974	American	novelist, essayist	Bad Feminist	
Jean Genet	1910–1986	French	novelist, playwright, poet	Our Lady of the Flowers	
Stefan George	1868–1933	German	poet	Main person of the literary and academic group known as the George-Kreis	
Hyeong-do Gi	1960–1989	Korean	poet	Black Leaf in My Mouth	
André Gide	1869–1951	French	novelist	The Immoralist	
Sky Gilbert	b. 1952	Canadian	playwright	co-founder and artistic director of Buddies in Bad Times	
John Gilgun	1935–2021	American	novelist, poet, short stories	Music I Never Dreamed Of	
Allen Ginsberg	1926–1997	American	poet	Howl	
M-E Girard	b. ?	Canadian	young adult literature	Girl Mans Up	
John Glassco	1909–1981	Canadian	poet	Memoirs of Montparnasse	
Connie Glynn	b. 1994	British	young adult literature	The Rosewood Chronicles	
Nikolai Gogol	1809–1852	Ukrainian	novelist, playwright	Evenings on a Farm Near Dikanka	
Michael Golding	b. 1958	American	novelist, screenwriter	A Poet of the Invisible World, Silk	
Andrea Goldsmith	b. 1950	Australian	novelist	The Prosperous Thief	
Agustín Gómez-Arcos	1933–1998	Spanish	novelist, playwright	L'Agneau carnivore, Ana non	
Ibis Gómez-Vega	b. 1952	Cuban	novelist, playwright	Send My Roots Rain	
Krzysztof Gonciarz	b. 1985	Polish	nonfiction writer		
Rigoberto González	b. 1970	American, Chicano	poet, memoirist, critic	Butterfly Boy: Memories of a Chicano Mariposa, Antonio's Card, Unpeopled Eden, What Drowns the Flowers in Your Mouth	
Brad Gooch	b. 1952	American	poet, essayist, biographer	Jailbait and Other Stories	
Paul Goodman	1911–1972	American	poet	Growing Up Absurd, The Community of Scholars	
Juan Goytisolo	1931–2017	Spanish	poet, essayist, novelist	Count Julian	
Camarin Grae	b. 1941	American	science fiction	The Secret in the Bird, Slick, Stranded	
Judy Grahn	b. 1940	American	poet	Love Belongs to Those Who Do the Feeling (poetry collection)	
R. W. Gray	b. ?	Canadian	short stories, novelist, poet	Crisp, Entropic	
Thomas Gray	1716–1771	English	poet	Elegy Written in a Country Churchyard	
Nick Green	b. ?	Canadian	playwright	Body Politic	
Harlan Greene	b. 1953	American	novelist, historian	What the Dead Remember, The German Officer's Boy	
Robert Joseph Greene	b. 1973	Canadian	short story writer	The Gay Icon Classics of the World, This High School Has Closets	
Garth Greenwell	b. 1978	American	novelist	What Belongs to You	
Sasha Grey	b. 1988	American	author, songwriter	Entourage, The Juliette Society	
Matthew Griffin	b. ?	American	novelist	Hide	
Doris Grumbach	1918–2022	American	novelist, biographer, essayist	Chamber Music	
Hervé Guibert	1955–1991	French	novelist	L'homme blessé (screenplay that he co-wrote)	
Alain Guiraudie	b. 1964	French	screenwriter, novelist	Stranger by the Lake, Now the Night Begins	
Thom Gunn	1929–2004	English	poet	The Man with Night Sweats	
Tim Gunn	b. 1953	American	memoir, nonfiction	The Natty Professor	

== H ==
Name	Lifetime	Nationality	Genre	Notable works	References
H.D., born Hilda Doolittle	1886–1961	American	poet	Helen in Egypt	
Samra Habib		Canadian	memoirist	We Have Always Been Here	
Saleem Haddad	b. 1983	Kuwaiti-British	novelist	Guapa	
Radclyffe Hall	1880–1943	English	novelist	The Well of Loneliness	
Richard Hall	1926–1992	American	novelist, short stories, drama, criticism	Couplings	
Aaron Hamburger	b. 1973	American	novelist, short story writer	The View from Stalin's Head (short story collection), Faith for Beginners	
Jane Eaton Hamilton	b. 1954	Canadian	poet, short story writer, memoirist, novelist	Love Will Burst into a Thousand Shapes, Hunger, Body Rain, No More Hurt, Weekend	
Dena Hankins	b. 1975	American	novelist, short story writer	Blue Water Dreams	
Bretten Hannam	b. ?	Canadian	screenwriter	North Mountain, Wildhood	
Joseph Hansen	1923–2004	American	novelist, poet	series of novels featuring private eye Dave Brandstetter	
Robin Hardy	1952–1995	Canadian	novelist, journalist, founding member of Publishing Triangle	Freelance contributor to The Advocate, Village Voice and Penthouse	
Bertha Harris	1937–2005	American	novelist	Lover	
Michael Harris	b. 1980	Canadian	non-fiction, young adult literature	The End of Absence: Reclaiming What We've Lost in a World of Constant Connection	
Adam Haslett	b. 1970	American	novelist, short story writer	You Are Not A Stranger Here, Imagine Me Gone	
Trebor Healey	b. 1962	American	novelist, poet	Through It Came Bright Colors	
Sydney Hegele	b. ?	Canadian	short stories	The Pump	
Scott Heim	b. 1966	American	novelist	Mysterious Skin	
Essex Hemphill	1957–1995	American	poet, activist	co-founder of Nethula Journal of Contemporary Literature	
Philip Hensher	b. 1965	English	novelist, critic, journalist	The Mulberry Empire	
John Herbert	1926–2001	Canadian	playwright	Fortune and Men's Eyes	
Catherine Hernandez	b. ?	Canadian	playwright, novelist	Scarborough	
Greg Herren	b. 1961	American	novelist	Murder in the Rue Chartres	
Patricia Highsmith	1921–1995	American	novelist	The Talented Mr. Ripley	
Scott Hightower	b. 1952	American	poet	Part of the Bargain	
Tomson Highway	b. 1951	Canadian	novelist, playwright	The Rez Sisters, Dry Lips Oughta Move to Kapuskasing, Kiss of the Fur Queen	
Thorn Kief Hillsbery	b. ?	American	novelist	What We Do Is Secret	
Daryl Hine	1936–2012	Canadian	poet	The Carnal and the Crane	
Hippothales	4th Century B.C.	Athenian	poet	numerous love poems to Lysis	
Guy Hocquenghem	1946–1988	French	theorist	Homosexual Desire, L'Amour en relief	
Susan Holbrook	b. 1967	Canadian	poet	Misled, Joy Is So Exhausting, Throaty Wipes	
Andrew Holleran (pseudonym of Eric Garber)	b. 1943	American	novelist, essayist	Dancer from the Dance	
Alan Hollinghurst	b. 1954	English	novelist	The Swimming Pool Library, The Folding Star, The Spell, The Line of Beauty	
Ike Holter	b. 1985	American	playwright	Hit the Wall, Exit Strategy, The Wolf at the End of the Block	
Gerard Manley Hopkins	1844–1889	English	poet	The Habit of Perfection	
Horace	65-8 B.C.	Roman	poet	Odes	
Leah Horlick	b. ?	Canadian	poet	Riot Lung, For Your Own Good	
Stephen Hough	b. 1961	British	pianist, composer, writer	The Final Retreat	
Silas House	b. 1971	American	novelist, journalist		
A. E. Housman	1859–1936	English	poet	A Shropshire Lad	
Richard Howard	1929–2022	American	poet	Alone With America	
James Howe	b. 1946	American	children's writer	The Misfits series	
Tanya Huff	b. 1957	Canadian	novelist	Blood Books series	
Langston Hughes	1902–1967	American	poet	The Big Sea	
Jay Hulme	b. 1997	British	poet	I Bet I Can Make You Laugh	
Bo Huston	1959–1993	American	novelist, short stories	Dream Life, The Listener	
Joris-Karl Huysmans	1848–1907	French	novelist	Against the Grain (À rebours, 1884)	
Maureen Hynes	b. ?	Canadian	poet	Rough Skin	

== I ==
Name	Lifetime	Nationality	Genre	Notable works	References
John Ibbitson	b. 1955	Canadian	journalist, playwright, children's writer	1812: Jeremy's War, The Landing, The Big Shift: The Seismic Change in Canadian Politics, Business, and Culture and What It Means for Our Future	
Nnanna Ikpo	b. ?	Nigerian	novelist	Fimí Sílẹ̀ Forever	
George K. Ilsley	b. 1958	Canadian	short stories, novelist	Random Acts of Hatred, ManBug	
Juana Inés de la Cruz	1648–1695	Mexican	poet, playwright	The Dream	
William Inge	1913–1973	American	playwright	Come Back, Little Sheba, Picnic	
Malcolm Ingram	b. 1968	Canadian	screenwriter	Tail Lights Fade, Small Town Gay Bar, Continental	
Christopher Isherwood	1904–1986	English	novelist, autobiographer	I Am a Camera, Down There on a Visit, A Single Man, Christopher and His Kind	
Arturo Islas	1938–1991	American	writer	The Rain God	
Harish Iyer	b. 1979	Indian	journalist	social media writer (blogs, Facebook and Twitter)	

== J ==
Name	Lifetime	Nationality	Genre	Notable works	References
Narelda Jacobs	b. 2000	Australian	television journalist	10 News First Perth	
Tove Jansson	1914–2001	Finnish	novelist, painter, illustrator, comic strip author	Moomins series	
Derek Jarman	1942–1994	English	author and filmmaker	At Your Own Risk	
Alfred Jarry	1873–1907	French	writer	Ubu Roi	
Sarah Orne Jewett	1849–1909	American	novelist, short story writer and poet	The Country of the Pointed Firs	
Geraldine Jewsbury	1812–1880	British	novelist, London literary social figure	Zoe: the History of Two Lives	
Craig Johnson	b. ?	American	screenwriter, film director	True Adolescents, The Skeleton Twins	
Punkie Johnson	b. 1985	American	comedian	Saturday Night Live, The Comedy Store	
Scott Jones	b. ?	Canadian	playwright, screenwriter	Coin Slot, Freedom, I Forgive You	
June Jordan	1936–2002	American	poet	Directed by Desire: Collected Poems	
Amanda Junquera Butler	1898–1986	Spanish	chronicler, translator, storyteller	Personajes de la Inquisición (Characters of the Inquisition, by William Thomas Walsh), Un hueco en la luz	
Claude Jutra	1930–1986	Canadian	screenwriter	Mon oncle Antoine, Kamouraska	

== K ==
Name	Lifetime	Nationality	Genre	Notable works	References
Karin Kallmaker	b. 1960	American	romance, erotica, science fiction	Maybe Next Time	
Patricia Karvelas	b. 1981	Australian	radio presenter, journalist	RN Breakfast	
Christopher Kelly	b. ?	American	novelist, journalist	A Push and a Shove	
Fran Kelly	b. 1988	Australian	radio presenter, journalist	Breakfast	
Jonathan Kemp	b. 1967	English	novelist	London Triptych	
Randall Kenan	1963–2020	American	writer	Let the Dead Bury Their Dead, A Visitation of Spirits	
Nina Kennedy	b. 1960	American	writer, pianist, screenwriter	Practicing for Love: A Memoir	
Maurice Kenny	1929–2016	American	poet	The Mama Poems	
Piper Kerman	b. 1969	American	writer, author, memoirist	Orange is the New Black	
Jack Kerouac	1922–1969	American	novelist	On the Road, The Subterraneans	
Kevin Killian	1952–2019	American	poet, novelist, playwright	Bedrooms Have Windows, Impossible Princess, Stone Marmalade	
Willyce Kim	b. 1946	American	poet, novelist	Eating Artichokes, Dead Heat	
Gary Kinsman	b. 1955	Canadian	sociologist	The Regulation of Desire: Homo and Hetero Sexualities	
Heinrich von Kleist	1777–1811	Prussian	poet, dramatist, short story writer, and novelist	The Broken Jug, The Marquise of O, Michael Kohlhaas, Penthesilea, The Prince of Homburg	
Todd Klinck	b. 1974	Canadian	novelist, journalist, screenwriter	Tacones, Sugar	
TJ Klune	b. 1982	American	novelist	The House in the Cerulean Sea, Somewhere Beyond the Sea, The Extraordinaries Series, Under the Whispering Door	
Tamai Kobayashi	b. 1966	Canadian	novelist, short story writer	Prairie Ostrich	
Wayne Koestenbaum	b. 1958	American	poet and cultural critic	The Queen's Throat	
Bernard-Marie Koltès	1948–1989	French	playwright	La Nuit juste avant les forêts, Dans la solitude des champs de coton	
Bill Konigsberg	b. 1970	American	sportswriter, young adult literature	Out of the Pocket, Openly Straight	
Greg Kramer	1961–2013	British/Canadian	novelist, playwright	The Pursemonger of fugu, Hogtown Bonbons	
Larry Kramer	1935–2020	American	novelist, journalist, playwright	Faggots, The Normal Heart	
Ellen Kushner	b. 1955	American	writer	Thomas the Rhymer	
Tony Kushner	b. 1956	American	playwright	Angels in America: A Gay Fantasia on National Themes	
Mikhail Kuzmin	1872–1936	Russian	writer	The Trout Breaks the Ice	
Lydia Kwa	b. 1959	Singaporean-Canadian	novelist	This Place Called Absence, The Walking Boy	

== L ==
Name	Lifetime	Nationality	Genre	Notable works	References
Lawrence La Fountain-Stokes	b. 1968	Puerto Rican	poet, playwright, scholar	Uñas pintadas de azul/Blue Fingernails	
Kama La Mackerel	b. ?	Mauritian-Canadian	poet	ZOM-FAM	
Richard Labonté	1949–2022	Canadian	literary critic, anthologist	Editor of works like Best Gay Erotica 2005	
Edward A. Lacey	1938–1995	Canadian	poet	The Delight of Hearts, or What You Will Not Find in Any Book	
Myriam Lacroix	b. ?	Canadian	novelist	How It Works Out	
Ben Ladouceur	b. 1987	Canadian	poet	Otter	
Jean-Luc Lagarce	1957–1995	French	playwright	Juste la fin du monde	
Selma Lagerlöf	1859–1940	Swedish	novelist, playwright	Gösta Berling's Saga	
Lori L. Lake	b. 1960	American	novelist	Gun Series police quadrology	
Kevin Lambert	b. 1992	Canadian	novelist	Tu aimeras ce que tu as tué, Querelle de Roberval	
Michael Lannan	b. ?	American	screenwriter	Looking	
Benjamin Law	b. 1982	Australian	journalist	The Family Law, Gaysia	
D. H. Lawrence	1885–1930	English	novelist, playwright	The Rainbow, Lady Chatterley's Lover	
David Leavitt	b. 1961	American	novelist	The Lost Language of Cranes	
Fran Lebowitz	b. 1950	American	comedic essayist	Metropolitan Life, Social Studies	
Violette Leduc	1907–1972	French	novelist	La Batarde, Therese and Isabelle	
John Alan Lee	1933–2013	Canadian	sociologist	The Colours of Love, Getting Sex	
Vernon Lee	1856–1935	French	essayist	Satan the Waster	
Yoon Ha Lee	b. 1979	American	novelist	Machineries of Empire	
R. B. Lemberg	b. 1976	Ukrainian-American	author	The Four Profound Weaves	
Vange Leonel	1963-2014	Brazilian	singer-songwriter	Nau, The Sexual Life of the Savages (compilation)	
Konstantin Leontiev	1831–1891	Russian	literary critic, philosopher	The East, Russia, and Slavdom (essay collection)	
Robert Lepage	b. 1957	Canadian	playwright, screenwriter	The Confessional, Polygraph, Far Side of the Moon	
Douglas LePan	1914–1998	Canadian	poet	The Wounded Prince, Bright Glass of Memory, Macalister	
Alex Leslie	b. ?	Canadian	poet, short story writer	People Who Disappear, The Things I Heard About You	
David Levithan	b. 1972	American	novelist	Boy Meets Boy	
Matthew G. Lewis	1775–1818	English	novelist	The Monk	
Ali Liebegott	b. 1971	American	poet	writer on Transparent	
José Lezama Lima	1910–1976	Cuban	novelist	Paradiso	
Earl Lind	1874–?	American	autobiographer	Autobiography of an Androgyne	
Eddie Linden	1935–2023	British	poet and editor	Hampstead by Night	
Peter Lloyd	b. 1966	Australian	journalist	Lateline	
Lynette Loeppky	b. ?	Canadian	memoirist	Cease	
Audre Lorde	1934–1992	American	poet, essayist	Zami: A New Spelling of My Name, Sister Outsider	
Adam Lowe	b. 1985	British	poet	Troglodyte Rose	
Michael Lowenthal	b. 1969	American	novelist	Avoidance	
Ed Luce	b. ?	American	graphic novelist	Wuvable Oaf	
Michael Lynch	1944–1991	Canadian	poet, journalist, academic	These Waves of Dying Friends	
Elizabeth A. Lynn	b. 1946	American	novelist	Chronicles of Tornor	

== M ==
Name	Lifetime	Nationality	Genre	Notable works	References
Ann-Marie MacDonald	b. 1958	Canadian	playwright, novelist	Goodnight Desdemona (Good Morning Juliet), Fall on Your Knees, The Way the Crow Flies	
Bryden MacDonald	b. 1960	Canadian	playwright	Whale Riding Weather	
Hamish Macdonald	b. 1981	Australian	broadcast journalist	ABC's Q+A	
Lee MacDougall	b. ?	Canadian	playwright	High Life, The Gingko Tree	
Daniel MacIvor	b. 1962	Canadian	playwright, screenwriter	House, Marion Bridge, Weirdos	
John Henry Mackay	1864–1933	Scottish-German	novelist, philosopher	Die Anarchisten (The Anarchists)	
Bennett Madison	b. 1981	American	novelist	Lulu Dark (young adult series)	
Gregory Maguire	b. 1954	American	novelist	Wicked: The Life and Times of the Wicked Witch of the West	
Anand Mahadevan	b. 1979	Indian-Canadian	novelist	The Strike	
Louise Maheux-Forcier	1929–2015	Canadian	novelist	Amadou, Une Forêt pour Zoé	
Klaus Mann	1906–1949	German	novelist, short story writer	Mephisto	
Thomas Mann	1875–1955	German	novelist, short story writer, essayist	Death in Venice	
Jaime Manrique	b. 1949	Colombian-American	poet, journalist	Latin Moon in Manhattan, Eminent Maricones	
Blaine Marchand	b. 1949	Canadian	poet	columnist for Ottawa's LGBT newspaper Capital Xtra!	
Jovette Marchessault	1938–2012	Canadian	novelist, playwright	La Terre est trop courte, Violette Leduc, Le Voyage magnifique d'Emily Carr	
Daphne Marlatt	b. 1942	Canadian	poet, novelist	Ana Historic, The Given, This Tremor Love Is	
Douglas A. Martin	b. 1973	American	novelist, poet	Outline of My Lover	
Paula Martinac	b. 1954	American	novelist, non-fiction	Out of Time, Home Movies	
Arkady Martine	b. 1985	American	novelist	A Memory Called Empire, A Desolation Called Peace	
Jacques Martineau	b. 1963	French	film director, screenwriter	Jeanne et le Garçon formidable	
Richard Mason	b. 1978	South African/British	novelist	The Drowning People	
Blair Mastbaum	b. 1979	American	novelist	Clay's Way, Us Ones in Between	
Nemir Matos-Cintrón	b. 1949	Puerto Rican	poet	Las mujeres no hablan asi, A través del aire y del fuego pero no del cristal' "El arte de morir y La pequeña muerte,"Aliens in NYC."	
F. O. Matthiessen	1902–1950	American	literary critic	American Renaissance	
Robin Maugham	1916–1981	English	author	The Servant, The Wrong People	
W. Somerset Maugham	1874–1965	English	playwright, novelist	Of Human Bondage	
Armistead Maupin	b. 1944	American	novelist	Tales of the City	
Tawiah M'carthy	b. ?	Canadian	playwright	Obaaberima	
Richard McCann	1949–2021	American	short story writer, poet	Ghost Letters (poetry collection)	
Barry McCrea	b. 1974	Irish	novelist, academic	The First Verse	
Carson McCullers	1917–1967	American	novelist	Reflections in a Golden Eye	
Val McDermid	b. 1955	British	novelist	The Mermaids Singing	
Keith McDermott	b. 1953	American	novelist, playwright	Acqua Calda	
R.W.R McDonald	?	Crime Fiction	novelist	The Nancys, Nancy Business	
Michael McDowell	1950–1999	American	novelist, screenwriter	Beetlejuice screenplay and story	
Peter McGehee	1955–1991	American/Canadian	novelist	Boys Like Us, Sweetheart	
Fiona Kelly McGregor	b. 1965	Australian	novelist, essayist, critic	Indelible Ink, Strange Museums	
Vestal McIntyre	b. ?	American	short story writer	Lake Overturn	
Terrence McNally	1938–2020	American	playwright	The Ritz, Love! Valour! Compassion!	
Casey McQuiston	b. 1991	American	novelist	Red, White, & Royal Blue	
Lída Merlínová	1906–1988	Czech	novelist	Vyhnanci lásky (Exiles of Love)	
Mark Merlis	1950–2017	American	novelist	An Arrow's Flight, American Studies	
James Merrill	1926–1995	American	poet	The Changing Light at Sandover, A Different Person	
Charlotte Mew	1869–1928	English	poet	The Farmer's Bride (poetry collection)	
Shayne Michael	b. ?	Canadian	poet	Fif et sauvage	
Michelangelo	1475–1564	Italian	artist, poet	poetry and artistic work such as "David"	
Grant Michaels	1947–2009	American	mysteries	A Body to Dye For, Dead as a Doornail	
Stevie Mikayne	b. ?	Canadian	mystery, children's	UnCatholic Conduct, Illicit Artifacts	
Edna St. Vincent Millay	1892–1950	American	poet	"Euclid alone has looked on Beauty bare", "Renascence", and "The Ballad of the Harp-Weaver" (poems)	
Isabel Miller (pseudonym of Alma Routsong)	1924–1996	American	novelist	A Place for Us	
Roswell George Mills	1896–1966	Canadian	journalist, poet	Les Mouches Fantastiques	
John Milton	1608–1674	English	poet	Paradise Lost, Paradise Regained	
David Miranda	b. 1985	Brazilian	journalist, politician	detailing mass surveillance by the NSA	
Yukio Mishima	1925–1970	Japanese	poet, playwright, novelist	Confessions of a Mask	
Sylvia Molloy	1938–2022	Argentine	essayist and academic		
Paul Monette	1945–1995	American	poet, essayist	Borrowed Time	
Carlos Monsiváis	1938–2010	Mexican	journalist, biographer	Días de guardar	
Shani Mootoo	b. 1957	Canadian	novelist	Cereus Blooms at Night, Moving Forward Sideways Like a Crab	
Cherríe Moraga	b. 1952	Chicana	poet, essayist, playwright	Loving in the War Years	
Ethan Mordden	b. 1947	American	novelist, essayist	"Buddies" cycle of novels	
César Moro	1903–1956	Peruvian	poet	La tortuga ecuestre	
Erwin Mortier	b. 1965	Belgian	novelist, poet, essayist, translator	While the Gods Were Sleeping	
Amal El-Mohtar	b. 1984	Canadian	novelist, poet	This Is How You Lose the Time War	
Erín Moure	b. 1955	Canadian	poet	Furious, O Cidadan, Little Theatres	
Brane Mozetič	b. 1958	Slovenian	poet, writer, editor, translator	Banalije	
Cherry Muhanji	b. 1939	American	novelist, poet	Her	
Tamsyn Muir	b. 1985	New Zealand	novelist	Gideon the Ninth, Nona the Ninth	
Manuel Mujica Láinez	1910–1984	Argentine	novelist, essayist	Glosas castellanas	
Mirjam Müntefering	b. 1969	German	novelist	Welche Farbe auch immer oder das Blaue Gefühl	
Eileen Myles	b. 1949	American	poet and essayist	Chelsea Girls	

== N ==
Name	Lifetime	Nationality	Genre	Notable works	References
Hasan Namir	b. 1987	Canadian	novelist	God in Pink	
Jim Nason	b. ?	Canadian	novelist, poet, short stories	The Housekeeping Journals, Rooster, Dog, Crow	
Nathanaël (Nathalie Stephens)	b. 1970	Canadian	poet	The Middle Notebooks, Touch to Affliction	
Michael Nava	b. 1954	American	mystery novels	How Town, The Hidden Law, The Death of Friends, The Burning Plain, and Rag and Bone	
Yves Navarre	1940–1994	French	writer	Le Jardin d'acclimatation	
Abdi Nazemian	b. 1976	Iranian/American	novelist, screenwriter	The Walk-In Closet, The Quiet	
Luis Negrón	b. 1970	Puerto Rican	short stories	Mundo Cruel	
Frances Negrón-Muntaner	b. 1966	Puerto Rican	filmmaker	Brincando el charco: Portrait of a Puerto Rican	
Patrick Ness	b. 1971	American	novelist	Chaos Walking, Monsters of Men, A Monster Calls	
Chris New	b. 1981	British	screenwriter	Ticking, Chicken, A Smallholding	
Anaïs Nin	1903–1977	French	diarist	Delta of Venus, Little Birds	
Éric Noël	b. 1984	Canadian	playwright	Faire des enfants, L'Amoure Looks Something Like You, Ces regards amoureux de garçons altérés	
Salvador Novo	1904–1974	Mexican	poet	Romance de Angelillo y Adela	
Katia Noyes	b. ?	American	writer	Crashing America	

== O ==
Name	Lifetime	Nationality	Genre	Notable works	References
Achy Obejas	b. 1956	Cuban/American	writer and translator	Memory Mambo	
Silvina Ocampo	1903–1993	Argentine	writer	"Letter Lost in a Drawer" (1956)	
Frank O'Hara	1926–1966	American	poetry	Lunch Poems	
Joe Okonkwo	b. ?	American	novelist	Jazz Moon	
Anthony Oliveira	b. ?	Canadian	novelist	Dayspring	
Tasmin Omond	b. 1984	British	author and journalist	Rush – The Making of a Climate Activist	
Jamie O'Neill	b. 1962	Irish	novelist	At Swim, Two Boys	
Salvadora Onrubia	1894-1972	Argentinean	poet, feminist anarchist	The Miraculous Spinning Wheel	
Joe Orton	1933–1967	English	playwright	Loot	
Alice Oseman	b. 1994	English	author	Heartstopper, Loveless	
Lawrence O'Toole	b. ?	Canadian	film critic, memoirist	Heart's Longing: Newfoundland, New York and the Distance Home	
Wilfred Owen	1893–1918	English	poet	"Anthem for Doomed Youth" (poem)	

== P ==
Name	Lifetime	Nationality	Genre	Notable works	References
Pai Hsien-yung	b. 1937	Taiwanese	novelist	Taipei People, Crystal Boys	
Chuck Palahniuk	b. 1962	American	novelist	Fight Club, Haunted, Invisible Monsters	
John Palmer	1943–2020	Canadian	playwright, screenwriter	A Touch of God in the Golden Age, Sugar	
Morris Panych	b. 1952	Canadian	playwright	Girl in the Goldfish Bowl, The Ends of the Earth	
Michelle Paradise	b. ?	American	writer	The Originals, Star Trek: Discovery	
Arleen Paré	b. 1946	Canadian	poet, novelist	Paper Trails, Leaving Now, Lake of Two Mountains	
Sophia Parnok	1885–1933	Russian	poet	Алмаст (Almast, libretto)	
Pier Paolo Pasolini	1922–1975	Italian	novelist, playwright	Ragazzi di vita, Una vita violenta	
Benito Pastoriza Iyodo	b. 1954	Puerto Rican	poet, narrator, essayist	Cartas a la sombra de tu piel	
Walter Pater	1839–1894	British	novelist, essayist, literary critic	The Renaissance (1873), Marius the Epicurean (1885)	
Robert Patrick	b. 1937	American	playwright	Kennedy's Children, Camera Obscura	
Fiona Patton	b. 1962	Canadian	novelist	The Branion Realm (book series)	
Karleen Pendleton Jiménez	b. 1971	American/Canadian	memoirist	How to Get a Girl Pregnant	
Sandro Penna	1906–1977	Italian	poet	This Strange Joy	
Cristina Peri Rossi	1830–1894	Uruguayan	poet	La nave de los locos	
Néstor Perlongher	1949–1992	Argentine	poet	Prosa plebeya	
Fernando Pessoa	1888–1935	Portuguese	poet, literary critic	Mensagem, The Book of Disquiet	
Petronius	c. 27–66	Roman	novelist	The Satyricon	
Katherine Philips	1632–1664	English	poet	Translator of Pierre Corneille's Pompée and Horace	
Edward O. Phillips	1931–2020	Canadian	novelist	Sunday's Child, Buried on Sunday	
Leah Lakshmi Piepzna-Samarasinha	b. 1975	Canadian	poet	Love Cake (poetry collection)	
János Pilinszky	1921–1981	Hungarian	poet	Nagyvárosi ikonok	
Sarah Pinder	b. ?	Canadian	poet	Cutting Room, Common Place	
Virgilio Piñera	1912–1979	Cuban	poet, novelist, playwright	Rene's Flesh	
Jean-Paul Pinsonneault	1923–1978	Canadian	novelist, dramatist	Les terres sèches	
Alejandra Pizarnik	1936–1972	Argentine	poet	Los trabajos y las noches, Extracción de la piedra de la locura and El infierno musical	
David Plante	b. 1940	American	novelist	Francoeur Trilogy - The Family, The Country and The Woods	
Hazel Jane Plante	b. ?	Canadian	novelist	Little Blue Encyclopedia (for Vivian), Any Other City	
August von Platen	1796–1835	Bavarian	poet	Gedichte	
Plato	427–327 B.C.	Greek	philosopher	Symposium	
Casey Plett	b. 1987	Canadian	short stories	A Safe Girl to Love	
William Plomer	1903–1973	South African	novelist, poet	literary editor for Faber and Faber	
Plutarch	c. 46–c. 119	Greek	historian, biographer, essayist	Parallel Lives	
Craig Poile	b. ?	Canadian	poet	True Concessions	
Sydney Pokorny	1965–2008	American	journalist	So You Want to be a Lesbian?	
Sarah Ponsonby	1755–1831	Anglo-Irish	writer	known as one of the "Ladies of Llangollen"	
Paul David Power	b. ?	Canadian	playwright	Crippled	
Ljuba Prenner	1906–1977	Slovenian	novelist, dramatist	Neznani storilec (The Unknown Perpetrator, first crime novel of Slovenia); Bruc: roman neznanega slovenskega študenta (Freshman: The Novel of an Unknown Slovene Student, an autobiographical novel which explores the fluidity of sexual identity in the interwar period)	
John Preston	1945–1994	American	novelist, editor	I Once Had a Master	
Edward Irenaeus Prime-Stevenson	1858–1942	American	novelist, journalist	Imre: a Memorandum, The Intersexes, Left to Themselves: Being the Ordeal of Philip and Gerald, White Cockades	
Marcel Proust	1871–1922	French	novelist, essayist	A la recherche du temps perdu (In Search of Lost Time)	
Manuel Puig	1932–1990	Argentine	novelist	Kiss of the Spider Woman	

== Q ==
Name	Lifetime	Nationality	Genre	Notable works	References
Yair Qedar	b. 1969	Israeli	journalist, screenwriter	Gay Days	
Qiu Miaojin	b. 1969	Taiwanese	journalist, filmmaker	Notes of a Crocodile, Last Words from Montmartre	
Andy Quan	b. 1969	Canadian	poetry, short fiction, non-fiction	Calendar Boy, Six Positions	
Carol Queen	b. 1957	American	non-fiction, erotica	Real Live Nude Girl: Chronicles of Sex-Positive Culture	
Sina Queyras	b. 1963	Canadian	poetry	Autobiography of Childhood, Lemon Hound, Expressway	
D. Michael Quinn	1944–2021	American	historian	Same-Sex Dynamics Among Nineteenth-Century Americans: A Mormon Example	

== R ==
Name	Lifetime	Nationality	Genre	Notable works	References
Cheryl Rainfield	b. 1972	Canadian	novels, short stories	Scars	
David Rakoff	1964-2012	Canadian	humorist	Fraud, Don't Get Too Comfortable	
Ahmad Danny Ramadan	b. 1984	Syrian-Canadian	novelist, short stories	Death and Other Fools, Aria, The Clothesline Swing	
Manuel Ramos Otero	1948–1990	Puerto Rican	poet, writer	The Story of the Woman of the Sea	
James Randi	1928–2020	Canadian	scientific skeptic	An Encyclopedia of Claims, Frauds, and Hoaxes of the Occult and Supernatural	
Lev Raphael	b. 1954	American	novelist, short stories, memoir, mysteries	Dancing on Tisha B'Av, Winter Eyes	
Ian Iqbal Rashid	b. 1968	Tanzanian/Canadian	screenwriter, poet	Touch of Pink	
David Rayside	b. 1947	Canadian	political scientist	On the Fringe: Gays and Lesbians in Politics	
John Rechy	b. 1931	American	fiction	City of Night	
Riley Redgate	b. ?	American	young adult fiction	Seven Ways We Lie, Note Worthy, Final Draft	
Paul Reed	1956-2002	American	fiction, memoir, erotica	Facing It, Longing	
Raziel Reid	b. 1990	Canadian	young adult fiction	When Everything Feels Like the Movies	
Taylor Jenkins Reid	b. 1983	American	novelist	The Seven Husbands of Evelyn Hugo, Atmosphere	
Tiana Reid	b. ?	Canadian	poet	Nightnursing	
Steven Reigns	b. 1975	American	poet	Inheritance, The Gay Rub, In The Room, and 3-Pack Jack (poetical works)	
Mary Renault	1905–1983	English	fiction	The Charioteer, The Last of the Wine	
Glen Retief	b. ?	South African/American	memoirist	The Jack Bank	
Josine Reuling	1899–1961	Dutch	writer	Terug naar het eiland	
Gerard Reve	1923–2006	Dutch	writer	Op weg naar het einde, Nader tot U	
Nina Revoyr	b. 1969	American	novelist	Southland	
Shane Rhodes	b. ?	Canadian	poetry	Holding Pattern, The Bindery	
Christopher Rice	b. 1978	American	author	The Heavens Rise, The Vines	
Adrienne Rich	1929–2012	American	poetry	The Dream of a Common Language, Diving into the Wreck	
Christopher Richards	b. 1961	Canadian	playwright	Molly Wood	
Bill Richardson	b. 1955	Canadian	humorist	Bachelor Brothers' Bed and Breakfast	
Nancy Richler	1957–2018	Canadian	novelist	Your Mouth Is Lovely, The Impostor Bride	
Keith Ridgway	b. 1965	Irish	novelist	The Long Falling	
Arthur Rimbaud	1854–1891	French	poetry	A Season in Hell	
Mireya Robles	b. 1934	Cuban	writer	Tiempo artesano. Barcelona: Campos	
Sophie Robinson	b. 1985	English	poet	a	
Robert Rodi	b. 1956	American	writer	Codename: Knockout, Kept Boy	
Nelson Rodrigues	1912–1980	Brazilian	writer, playwright	Vestido de Noiva	
Juana María Rodríguez	1959-	Cuban	non-fiction, queer theory	Puta Life: Seeing Latinas, Working Sex; Sexual Futures, Queer Gestures, and Other Latina Longings; Queer Latinidad: Identity Practices, Discursive Spaces	
Paul Rogers	1936–1984	American	novelist	Saul's Book	
Ned Rorem	1923–2022	American	composer	The Paris Diary of Ned Rorem	
Mark Brennan Rosenberg	b. ?	American	comedy	Blackouts and Breakdowns	
Sinclair Ross	1908–1996	Canadian	novelist	As For Me and My House	
Jeffrey Round	b. ?	Canadian	mystery	A Cage of Bones	
Andrea Routley	b. ?	Canadian	short stories	Jane and the Whales	
Michael Rowe	b. 1962	Canadian	journalist	Writing Below the Belt: Conversations with Erotic Authors, Other Men's Sons	
André Roy	b. 1944	Canadian	poet	Action writing, Monsieur désir	
Shawn Stewart Ruff	b. 1959	American	novelist, editor	Finlater, GJS II, Go the Way Your Blood Beats	
Muriel Rukeyser	1913–1980	American	poetry	The Book of the Dead	
Jane Rule	1931–2007	American/Canadian	novels, non-fiction	Desert of the Heart	
Joanna Russ	1937–2011	American	science fiction	The Female Man	
Paul Russell	b. 1956	American	novels	The Coming Storm, The Unreal Life of Sergey Nabokov	
Meredith Russo	b. c. 1986/1987	American	novelist	If I Was Your Girl	
Elizabeth Ruth	b. 1968	Canadian	novelist	Ten Good Seconds of Silence, Smoke, Matadora	
Patrick Ryan	b. 1965	American	short story writer, novelist	The Dream Life of Astronauts, Send Me	
Geoff Ryman	b. 1951	Canadian/British	science fiction/fantasy	Lust, The Unconquered Country	

== S ==
Name	Lifetime	Nationality	Genre	Notable works	References
Rami Saari	b. 1963	Israeli	poet	Behold, I've Found My Home, Men at the Crossroad, Introduction to Sexual Linguistics	
Umberto Saba	1883–1957	Italian	poet, novelist	Songbook	
Vita Sackville-West	1892–1962	British	novelist	The Land	
Marquis de Sade	1740–1814	French	novelist, philosopher, playwright	The 120 Days of Sodom, Justine, Philosophy in the Bedroom, Juliette	
Benjamin Alire Sáenz	b. 1954	American	novelist	Everything Begins and Ends at the Kentucky Club	
Assotto Saint	1957–1994	American	poet, essayist, playwright	Wishing for Wings, Spells of a Voodoo Doll	
Trish Salah	b. ?	Canadian	poet	Wanting in Arabic	
Saleem	b. ?	American	playwright, actor, DJ, and dancer	Salam Shalom	
George Santayana	1863–1952	Spanish-American	novelist, poet, philosopher	The Realms of Being	
Mayra Santos-Febres	b. 1966	Puerto Rican	novelist, poet, literary critic	Sirena Selena	
Sappho	c. 630–c. 570 B.C.	Greek	poet	Ode to Aphrodite	
Severo Sarduy	1937–1993	Cuban	poet, playwright	Cobra	
Frank Sargeson	1903–1982	New Zealander	short story writer	A Man and his Wife	
May Sarton	1912–1995	Belgian-American	poet, novelist, memoirist	Plant Dreaming Deep, Journal of a Solitude, The House by the Sea, Recovering and At Seventy	
Dan Savage	b. 1964	American	journalist, editor	Advice column Savage Love, Skipping Towards Gomorrah: The Seven Deadly Sins and the Pursuit of Happiness in America	
Sarah Schulman	b. 1958	American	novelist, historian, playwright	Stagestruck: Theater, AIDS, and the Marketing of Gay America	
V. E. Schwab	b. 1987	American	novelist	Villains series, Shades of Magic series, The Invisible Life of Addie LaRue	
Gregory Scofield	b. 1966	Canadian	poet	The Gathering: Stones for the Medicine Wheel, Native Canadiana: Songs from the Urban Rez, Thunder Through My Veins	
Gail Scott	b. 1945	Canadian	novelist, essayist	My Paris, The Obituary, Biting the Error	
Manda Scott	b. 1962	Scottish	novelist	Hen's Teeth	
Sarah Scott	1723–1795	English	novelist	A Description of Millenium Hall and the Country Adjacent	
David Sedaris	b. 1956	American	essayist, short story writer	Naked (essay collection)	
Shyam Selvadurai	b. 1965	Sri Lankan-Canadian	novelist	Funny Boy	
Maurice Sendak	1928–2012	American	children's writer	Where the Wild Things Are	
Vikram Seth	b. 1952	Indian	writer	A Suitable Boy, The Golden Gate	
Anna Seward	1742–1809	English	poet	Louisa	
Ken Shakin	b. 1959	American	short story writer	Love Sucks	
Merry Shannon	b. 1979	American	novelist	Sword of the Guardian, Branded Ann	
Samantha Shannon	b. 1991	British	novelist	The Bone Season, The Priory of the Orange Tree	
Bradford Shellhammer	b. 1976	American	blogger and editor	Founding editor of Queerty	
Lorimer Shenher	b. ?	Canadian	non-fiction	That Lonely Section of Hell, This One Looks Like a Boy	
Reginald Shepherd	1963–2008	American	poet	Some Are Drowning	
Randy Shilts	1951–1994	American	journalist	The Mayor of Castro Street: The Life and Times of Harvey Milk, And the Band Played on: Politics, People, and the AIDS Epidemic	
Vivek Shraya	b. 1981	Canadian	short story writer	God Loves Hair, She of the Mountains	
Richard Siken	b. 1967	American	poet	Crush (Richard Siken)	
jaye simpson	b. ?	Canadian	poet	it was never going to be okay	
Andy Sinclair	b. ?	Canadian	novelist, short stories	Breathing Lessons	
Edith Sitwell	1887–1964	English	poet	"Still Falls the Rain" (poem)	
Michael Sledge	b. 1962	American	novelist, memoirist	The More I Owe You	
Ali Smith	b. 1962	Scottish	novelist	Free Love and Other Stories	
Danez Smith	b. ?	American	poet	Don't Call Us Dead	
Michael V. Smith	b. ?	Canadian	novelist, poet	Cumberland	
K. M. Soehnlein	b. 1965	American	novelist	The World of Normal Boys, You Can Say You Knew Me When	
Kamal Al-Solaylee	b. 1964	Yemeni-Canadian	journalist, memoirist	Intolerable: A Memoir of Extremes	
Pablo Soler Frost	b. 1965	Mexican	novelist, essayist	Malebolge	
Misha Solomon	b. ?	Canadian	poet	My Great-Grandfather Danced Ballet	
Susan Sontag	1933–2004	American	novelist, essayist	AIDS and Its Metaphors	
Tom Spanbauer	b. 1946	American	novelist	The Man Who Fell in Love with the Moon	
Sir Stephen Spender	1909–1995	English	novelist, poet, essayist	Poems	
Jack Spicer	1925–1965	American	poet	My Vocabulary Did This to Me: The Collected Poetry of Jack Spicer	
Rae Spoon	b. ?	Canadian	short story writer	First Grass Spring Fire, superioryouareinferior, My Prairie Home	
Gertrude Stein	1874–1946	American	novelist	The Autobiography of Alice B. Toklas	
Andreas Steinhöfel	b. 1962	German	novelist, author for children and teenagers	The Center of the World	
Ian Stephens	1955–1996	Canadian	poet	Diary of a Trademark	
Kent Stetson	b. 1948	Canadian	playwright	Warm Wind in China, As I Am	
Susan Stinson	b. ?	American	novelist	Venus of Chalk	
John Elizabeth Stintzi	b. ?	Canadian	novelist, poet	Vanishing Monuments, Junebat	
Charles Warren Stoddard	1843–1909	American	poet, journalist	Travel books about Polynesian life	
Aryeh Lev Stollman	b. 1954	Canadian-American	novelist, short story writer	The Far Euphrates	
Lytton Strachey	1880–1932	English	biographer	Queen Victoria (biography)	
Allan Stratton	b. 1951	Canadian	playwright	Rexy	
Susan Stryker	b. 1961	American	historian	Transgender History (2008)	
Douglas Stuart	b. 1976	Scottish-American	novelist	Shuggie Bain	
Howard Sturgis	1855–1920	Anglo-American	novelist	Tim: A Story of School Life, All That Was Possible	
Rebecca Sugar	b. 1987	American	screenwriter	Adventure Time	
Algernon Swinburne	1837–1909	English	poet	Poems and Ballads	
John Addington Symonds	1840–1893	British	poet, literary critic	Renaissance in Italy	
Scott Symons	1933–2009	Canadian	novelist	Place d'Armes, Civic Square, Helmet of Flesh	
Shawn Syms	b. 1970	Canadian	journalist, short stories	Nothing Looks Familiar	

== T ==
Name	Lifetime	Nationality	Genre	Notable works	References
Proma Tagore	b. ?	Indian/Canadian	poetry	language is not the only thing that breaks	
Mutsuo Takahashi	b. 1937	Japanese	poetry	Rose Tree, Fake Lovers	
Mariko Tamaki	b. 1975	Canadian	graphic novelist	Skim	
Jordan Tannahill	b. 1988	Canadian	playwright	Get Yourself Home Skyler James, Peter Fechter: 59 Minutes, rihannaboi95	
Joelle Taylor	b. 1967	British	poet and playwright	The Woman Who Was Not There, Songs My Enemy Taught Me	
Valerie Taylor	1913–1997	American	novelist and poet	The Lusty Land, Whisper Their Love, The Girls in 3-B, Stranger on Lesbos, A World Without Men, Return to Lesbos	
Michelle Tea	b. 1971	American	author, poet, and literary arts organizer	The Passionate Mistakes and Intricate Corruption of One Girl in America	
Sara Teasdale	1884–1933	American	writer, poet	Flame and Shadow, Love Song	
Richard Teleky	b. 1946	American-Canadian	novelist, poet, short stories, essays	The Paris Years of Rosie Kamin, Pack Up the Moon	
Alex Tétreault	b. 1994	Canadian	poet, playwright	Nickel City Fifs, Avert Your Gays	
Kai Cheng Thom	b. ?	Canadian	poet, novelist	A Place Called No Homeland, Fierce Femmes and Notorious Liars	
Colin Thomas	b. ?	Canadian	playwright	One Thousand Cranes, Two Weeks Twice a Year, Flesh and Blood, Sex Is My Religion	
Lee Thomas	b. ?	American	horror author	The Dust of Wonderland, The German	
Sara Tilley	b. 1978	Canadian	novelist, playwright	Skin Room, Duke	
James Tiptree Jr. (pseudonym of Alice Sheldon)	1917–1987	American	science fiction writer	Houston, Houston, Do You Read?, Her Smoke Rose Up Forever	
Colm Tóibín	b. 1955	Irish	novelist and short story writer	The Heather Blazing	
Sandi Toksvig	b. 1958	Danish	comedian, writer, presenter	Peas & Queues: The Minefield of Modern Manners, Great Journeys of the World	
Luisita Lopez Torregrosa	b. ?	Puerto Rican	journalist, memoirist	Before the Rain: A Memoir of Love and Revolution	
Peterson Toscano	b. 1965	American	playwright	Time in the Homo No Mo Halfway House	
Paul Toupin	1918–1993	Canadian	playwright, memoirist, essayist	Brutus, Souvenirs pour demain	
Kaleigh Trace	b. 1986	Canadian	non-fiction	Hot, Wet, and Shaking: How I Learned to Talk About Sex	
Matthew J. Trafford	b. ?	Canadian	short stories	The Divinity Gene	
Michel Tremblay	b. 1942	Canadian	playwright, novelist	Hosanna, Les Belles-sœurs, The Heart Laid Bare, Albertine in Five Times	
Roland Michel Tremblay	b. 1972	Canadian	novelist	Waiting for Paris	
Mary L. Trump	b. 1965	American	author	Too Much and Never Enough	
Christos Tsiolkas	b. 1965	Australian	novelist	The Slap	
Marina Tsvetaeva	1892–1941	Russian	poet	Remeslo, Posle Rossii	
Aren X. Tulchinsky	b. 1968	Canadian	novelist, screenwriter	The Five Books of Moses Lapinsky, Love Ruins Everything	
Arielle Twist	b. ?	Canadian	poet	Disintegrate / Dissociate	

== U ==
Name	Lifetime	Nationality	Genre	Notable works	References
Karl Heinrich Ulrichs	1825–1895	German	non-fiction	Research on the Riddle of Man-Manly Love	
Luz María Umpierre	b. 1947	Puerto Rican	poetry	The Margarita Poems	

== V ==
Name	Lifetime	Nationality	Genre	Notable works	References
Fernando Vallejo	b. 1942	Colombian	novelist	Our Lady of the Assassins	
Marlene van Niekerk	b. 1954	South African	author	Triomf	
Carl Van Vechten	1880–1964	American	novelist, photographer	Nigger Heaven	
Ruth Vanita	b. 1955	Indian	academic	Sappho and the Virgin Mary...Imagination, Queering India...and the West	
Anuja Varghese	b. ?	Canadian	short stories	Chrysalis	
R. M. Vaughan	1965–2020	Canadian	poet, novelist, playwright	A Quilted Heart	
Sándor Vay	1859–1918	Hungarian	journalist, chronicler	Gróf Vay Sándor munkái	
Valeria Vegas	b. 1985	Spanish	novelist, essayist	¡Digo! Ni puta ni santa. Las memorias de La Veneno (2015)	
Paul Verlaine	1844–1896	French	poet	Libretti for Vaucochard et Fils 1^{er} and Fisch-Ton-Kan	
Gore Vidal	1925–2012	American	novelist	The City and the Pillar, Myra Breckinridge	
Xavier Villaurrutia	1903–1950	Mexican	playwright, poet	Autos profanos	
David Viñas	1927–2011	Argentine	novelist, dramatist	Un Dios Cotidiano	
Virgil	70–19 B.C.	Roman	poet	Aeneid	
Renée Vivien	1877–1909	Anglo-French	poet	Cendres et Poussières	
Bruno Vogel	1898–1983	German	novelist, short stories	Alf	
Paula Vogel	b. 1951	American	playwright	How I Learned to Drive	
Ocean Vuong	b. 1988	Vietnamese-American	poet, novelist	Night Sky with Exit Wounds, On Earth We're Briefly Gorgeous	

== W ==
Name	Lifetime	Nationality	Genre	Notable works	References
Mark Waddell	b. ?	Canadian	mystery, horror, comedy	The Body in the Back Garden, Colin Gets Promoted and Dooms the World	
Rinaldo Walcott	b. 1965	Canadian	academic, cultural studies	Black Like Who?: Writing Black Canada	
Alice Walker	b. 1944	American	fiction	The Color Purple	
Rebecca Walker	b. 1969	American	non-fiction	To be Real: Telling the Truth and Changing the Face of Feminism	
Matthew Walsh	b. ?	Canadian	poet	these are not the potatoes of my youth, Terrarium	
Betsy Warland	b. 1946	American-Canadian	poetry, non-fiction	Breathing the Page: Reading the Act of Writing	
Sylvia Townsend Warner	1893–1978	English	novelist, poet, activist	A Moral Ending and Other Stories	
Patricia Nell Warren	1936–2019	American	fiction	The Front Runner	
Bryan Washington	b. 1993	American	fiction	Lot, Memorial	
Sarah Waters	b. 1966	British	fiction	Tipping the Velvet, Affinity, The Night Watch	
David Watmough	1926–2017	British-Canadian	fiction, plays	Collected Shorter Fiction of David Watmough: 1972–82	
Evelyn Waugh	1903–1966	English	fiction	Brideshead Revisited	
Thomas Waugh	b. 1948	Canadian	academic, art and film critic	Out/Lines: Underground Gay Graphics From Before Stonewall, Lust Unearthed: Vintage Gay Graphics from the DuBek Collection	
Jessica L. Webb	b. ?	Canadian	mysteries	Pathogen, Repercussions	
Barry Webster	b. 1961	Canadian	fiction	The Lava in My Bones	
Matthew James Weigel	b. ?	Canadian	poet	Whitemud Walking	
John Weir	b. 1959	American	novelist, journalist	The Irreversible Decline of Eddie Socket, What I Did Wrong	
Denton Welch	1915–1948	English	writer, painter	Maiden Voyage	
Robert Westfield	b. 1972	American	novelist	Suspension	
Edmund White	1940–2025	American	fiction	A Boy's Own Story, The Beautiful Room Is Empty	
Patrick White	1912–1990	Australian	fiction	Flaws in the Glass	
Joshua Whitehead	b. 1989	Canadian	poet, novelist	Full-Metal Indigiqueer, Johnny Appleseed	
William Whitehead	1931–2018	Canadian	television/radio documentaries, memoirist	Words to Live By	
Walt Whitman	1819–1892	American	poet	Leaves of Grass	
Zoe Whittall	b. 1976	Canadian	fiction	Bottle Rocket Hearts, Holding Still for As Long As Possible	
Oscar Wilde	1854–1900	English-Irish	fiction, playwright, poet	The Picture of Dorian Gray, The Importance of Being Earnest	
Thornton Wilder	1897–1975	American	fiction, plays	Our Town	
Ally Wilkes	b. ?	English	fiction	All the White Spaces	
Michael Willhoite	b. 1946	American	children's literature	Daddy's Roommate	
Jonathan Williams	1929–2008	American	poet	Jubilant Thicket: New and Selected Poems	
Leighton Alexander Williams	b. ?	Canadian	actor, playwright	Judas Noir	
Tennessee Williams	1911–1983	American	playwright	A Streetcar Named Desire, Cat on a Hot Tin Roof	
Tucky Williams	b. 1991	American	filmmaker, actress, screenwriter	Girl/Girl Scene, Dead Moon Rising	
Angus Wilson	1913–1991	English	author	Hemlock and After	
Douglas Wilson	1950–1992	Canadian	journalist, novelist	Labour of Love	
Jacqueline Wilson	b. 1945	English	novelist	The Story of Tracy Beaker, Double Act, Hetty Feather	
Jonathan Wilson	b. 1957	Canadian	actor and playwright	My Own Private Oshawa	
Martin Wilson	b. 1973	American	fiction	What They Always Tell Us	
Jia Qing Wilson-Yang	b. ?	Canadian	novelist	Small Beauty	
Johann Joachim Winckelmann	1717–1768	German	historian, archaeologist	Geschichte der Kunst des Alterthums (The History of Art in Antiquity	
Donald Windham	1920–2010	American	novelist and memoirist	The Dog Star	
Christa Winsloe	1888–1944	German	fiction	Yesterday and Today	
Jeanette Winterson	b. 1959	English	fiction	Oranges Are Not the Only Fruit	
Monique Wittig	1935–2003	French	philosopher	Le Corps Lesbien	
Rita Wong	b. 1968	Canadian	poet	monkeypuzzle	
Alan Woo	b. ?	Canadian	poet, short stories, children's literature	Maggie's Chopsticks	
Jaime Woo	b. ?	Canadian	non-fiction	Meet Grindr	
Marnie Woodrow	b. 1969	Canadian	novelist	Spelling Mississippi	
Virginia Woolf	1882–1941	English	novelist	Mrs Dalloway, Orlando: A Biography	
Cornell Woolrich	1903–1968	American	fiction	The Bride Wore Black, "Rear Window"	
Jean Wyllys	b. 1974	Brazilian	journalist, politician	Aflitos	

== Y ==
Name	Lifetime	Nationality	Genre	Notable works	References
Neon Yang	b. 1982/1983	Singaporean	author	The Genesis of Misery, The Black Tides of Heaven, The Red Threads of Fortune	
Yang Shuang-zi	b. 1984	Taiwanese	novelist	Seasons of Bloom, Taiwan Travelogue	
Bart Yates	b. 1962	American	novelist	Leave Myself Behind, Brothers Bishop, The Distance Between Us	
d'bi young	b. 1977	Canadian	poet, playwright	rivers and other blackness between us, word! sound! powah, blood.claat: one womban story	
Ian Young	b. 1945	Canadian	poet, non-fiction	The Gay Muse, The Male Homosexual in Literature	
Perry Deane Young	1941–2019	American	journalist, playwright	Two of the Missing, The David Kopay Story	
Marguerite Yourcenar	1903–1987	French	novelist	Memoirs of Hadrian	
Josée Yvon	1950–1994	Canadian	playwright, poet	Danseuse-mamelouk, Maîtresses-Cherokees	

== Z ==
Name	Lifetime	Nationality	Genre	Notable works	References
A. Light Zachary	b. ?	Canadian	poet	More Sure	
Luis Zapata	1951–2020	Mexican	novelist	De pétalos perennes (Perennial Petals)	
Eve Zaremba	1930–2025	Polish/Canadian	mystery novelist	A Reason to Kill, The Butterfly Effect	
Jerzy Zawieyski	1902–1969	Polish	poetry, novels	Gdzie jesteś, przyjacielu	
Fiona Zedde	b. 1976	Jamaican-American	novelist	Bliss	
Cyd Zeigler	b. 1973	American	sportswriter	The Outsports Revolution: Truth and Myth in the World of Gay Sports	
Xiran Jay Zhao	b. ?	Chinese-Canadian	fiction	Iron Widow	
Alexander Ziegler	1944–1987	Swiss	journalist, novelist	Die Konsequenz	
Richard Zimler	b. 1956	American/Portuguese	novelist	The Last Kabbalist of Lisbon, Hunting Midnight, The Search for Sana, The Seventh Gate, The Warsaw Anagrams	
Robert D. Zimmerman	b. 1952	American	mystery	Closet, Outburst	
Narcyza Żmichowska	1819–1876	Polish	poetry, novels	The Heathen	
Syd Zolf	b. 1968	Canadian	poet	Masque, Human Resources	
Daniel Zomparelli	b. ?	Canadian	poet, short stories	Everything Is Awful and You're a Terrible Person	
Mark Richard Zubro	b. ?	American	mystery	Tom and Scott mystery series	
Peter Zuckerman	b. 1979	American	journalist	Buried in the Sky	
Harriet Sohmers Zwerling	1928–2019	American	short stories, translation, essays	Notes of a Nude Model	
