= The Life I Lead =

The Life I Lead may refer to:

- The Life I Lead (song), a song from the 1964 Walt Disney film Mary Poppins
- The Life I Lead (play), a play by James Kettle about the actor David Tomlinson
- The Life I Lead (novel), a 1999 novel by Keith Banner
