= You Can Say You Knew Me When =

2005 novel by K. M. Soehnlein

- Author: K.M. Soehnlein (Karl Soehnlein)
- Language: English
- Genre: Gay fiction
- Published: 2005 (Kensington Books)
- Publication place: United States
- Media type: Paperback and hardback

You Can Say You Knew Me When is a novel by K.M. Soehnlein (Karl Soehnlein) following his best seller The World of Normal Boys.

== Plot ==
A thirty-something San Francisco gay radio journalist Jamie Garner reluctantly returns to his childhood home of Greenlawn, New Jersey, and discovers secrets from his dead father's sexual past, including photos with a friend actor Dean Foster and entourage of Jack Kerouac all covered by a 40-year secrecy. Upon his return to San Francisco, Jamie though trying desperately to maintain a monogamous relationship with his venture-capitalist boyfriend Woody, falls into a series of promiscuous relations after a hurried sexual encounter with a man in the rest room of Newark airport. For all his faults, Jamie, a sympathetic, often frustrating character tries to make peace with his father's deep-seated prejudices toward his sexuality and come to terms with his father's mysterious long-ago alternative life.

== Reviews ==
The novel has received mainly positive feedback, making it onto many lists such as Goodreads. The novel has been widely praised for the tackling of sexuality and acceptance, with special focus upon the scene building in 1990s San Francisco. The San Francisco chronicle summarized it as ""Engaging . . . the flow and intensity of the writing make it difficult to put Soehnlein's book down . . . With remarkably stylish and witty prose, Soehnlein keeps the reading convincing and compelling, displaying a knack for giving just enough detail to put the reader right in the scene."
