= Benito Pastoriza Iyodo =

Puerto Rican writer (1954–2022)

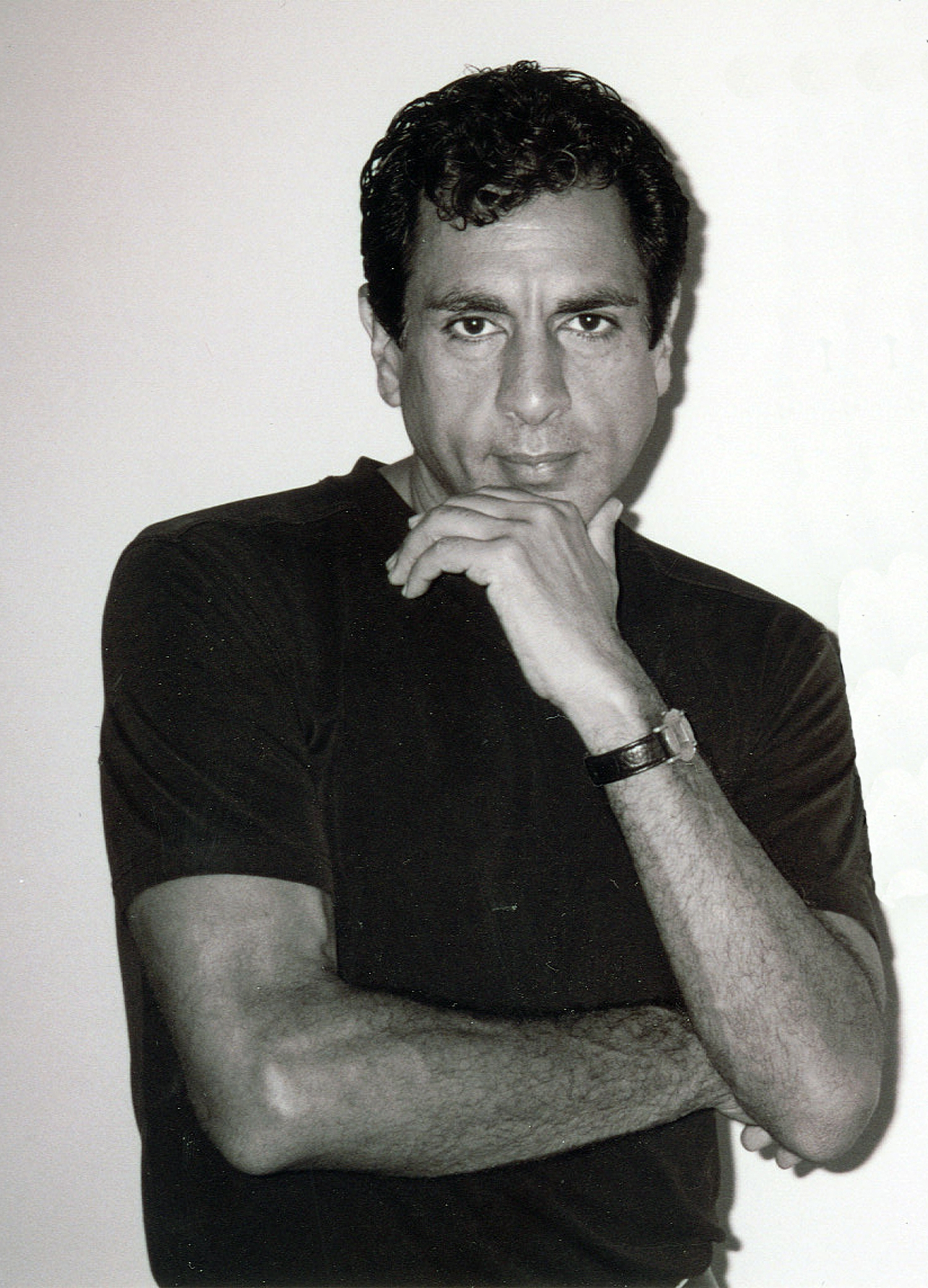
- Born: 14 December 1954; Humacao, Puerto Rico
- Died: 8 August 2022 (aged 67); Edinburg, Texas
- Occupations: Poet; author; essayist
- Writing career
- Genres: Literary Fiction, Poetry, Poetics

Benito Pastoriza Iyodo (14 December 1954 – 8 August 2022) was an author of poetry, poetics, fiction, and literary articles. The themes of his literary works included man's evolution from childhood to adulthood, examination of self, the precipices of culture and its rituals, violence in the cities, examination of stereotypes, the constructs of communication, gender roles and sexuality, education systems and racism, exploitation and the manifestation of exclusion through political and economic powers.

His oeuvre is manifested in multiple books: at least five collections of poetry, a novel, and two books of short stories. Three books of poetry and one volume of short stories have been published in bilingual editions (the original Spanish and English). The author's poems and short stories have been included in anthologies and journals published in the United States, Latin America and Spain.

== Biography ==
Earned a Master of Arts from the University of California, Santa Barbara. He has been recognized through various literary prizes, including the Ateneo Puertorriqueño Prize, the Chicano/Latino Literary Prize, the Julio Cortázar Prize (Uruguay) and the Hispanic Culture Review Poetry Award.

His writing has been influenced by the numerous cities where he has lived in the United States—New York, Philadelphia, Santa Barbara, Miami, Chicago and Houston—and his extensive travels throughout Latin America and Europe.

== Writing philosophy ==
Pastoriza Iyodo was interviewed several times and the dialogue usually returned to his philosophy on literary creation. In a 2006 interview for Chasqui (the Spanish-language literary magazine at Arizona State University) he was asked (rendered here in translated form):

“What do you believe is the role of the writer in today’s dysfunctional society?” To this, Pastoriza Iyodo replied: “A little bit of everything. We must be chroniclers, observers of changing societies - we have to be the flashing yellow light saying: watch out - be careful - where are we going? - let’s not throw ourselves off a cliff. A writer has to be the pulse of a changing language that is constantly reinventing itself. But the writer must not forget that he should also cultivate an art whose intrinsic role is also to entertain, to make one laugh, think and meditate on the important things in life.”

== Books: Poetry and fiction ==
=== Lo coloro de lo incoloro ===
His first book of Spanish poetry published in the United States – Lo coloro de lo incoloro (The color of the colorless) - won the Chicano/Latino Literary Prize competition in 1979-1980. The book was published by the University of California, Irvine in 1981.

=== Cuestión de hombres ===
The Latino Press (CUNY) published Cuestión de hombres (A Matter of Men) in 1996. One of the stories in the collection - El indiscreto encanto (The Indiscreet Charm) - received the Ateneo Puertorriqueño Award for fiction.

Aaron Michael Morales of Indiana State University wrote for MultiCultural Review's Summer 2009 issue that these stories are:

"...more about racial identity, both in relation to other cultures and to carving an identity out of one's own culture. ... it's hard not to read the first seven stories as scathing critiques of misogyny, gluttony, homophobia, masculinity and mankind's particular aversion to kindness. ... It is no matter, then, whether the readers see these stories as critiques or compassionate portraits of the downtrodden... humanity through Pastoriza Iyodo's lens is a view rarely seen."

=== Cartas a la sombra de tu piel ===
Cartas a la sombra de tu piel (Letters to the shadow of your skin) was published in Mexico in 2002 and it received the Voces Selectas award. Dr. Paulette Ramsey, of the University of the West Indies, wrote an article on this collection of poems in the Caribbean Quarterly, saying:

“The poems and prose pieces in each section portray a world that is vibrant, charged with life, vivid images of lovers in warm embraces, feelings of nostalgia, reminiscences on past erotic experiences and anxious anticipation of future ones. ... Bilingualism functions as an important rhetorical strategy and is demonstrated in different ways. Some poems are written in English entirely but most are in Spanish. ... This switching between linguistic modes is dominant in poems in which the poet advocates a ready acceptance and tolerance of difference – suggesting that sexuality is not limited to heterosexuality, in the same way that the same emotion can be communicated in different languages. ... Cartas a la sombra de tu piel is an intriguing addition to Spanish Caribbean poetry in general and specifically to the area of queer theory, a contemporary approach to literature and culture which developed out of gay and lesbian criticism, and regards sexual identities as fluid. It should provide interesting reading and generate much discussion."

=== Elegías de septiembre ===
Elegías de septiembre (September Elegies) is a book of poetry first published in 2003. The Mexican critic, Estela Porter Seale, characterized the book as follows:

"This work could be described as a thesis condemning optimistic rationalism [that believes] “ours is the best of all possible worlds”, advocating against all forms of extreme individualism that diminish the possibility of a harmonious coexistence with all things...." [From the Prologue by Estela Porter Seale in Pastoriza Iyodo, Benito. Elegías de septiembre. Editorial Tierra Firme, Mexico City, 2003, pp 5-9.]

In his review of the bilingual edition of the book, Rick Villalobo's review in Críticas Magazine (Library Journal) adds:

"Pastoriza Iyodo's observations are unrestrained, brooding over themes like poverty, war, nature and the unpredictable design of humanity. The poem "What Was All That About" exemplifies his open temperament, as when he writes "because the poverty of the spirit / because the poverty of the penny / did not arrive gratuitously / so easily someone must have invented it."

=== Nena, nena de mi corazón ===
Nena, nena de mi corazón (Beloved, beloved of my heart), published in 2006, is a collection of 16 short stories. As opposed to Cuestión de hombres (A Matter of Men), where each story had a male protagonist, Nena features female characters in tales of relationships, hardships, and displacement. According to the review by Liliana Wendorff (University of North Carolina at Pembroke), which was published by Críticas Magazine (part of Library Journal):

“The 16 parts, … are presented in the form of vignettes, epistles, chronicles, or commentaries. In spite of major hardships, the characters keep on searching for a better life in places that seem indifferent and even hostile. Women are central to these tales. … This work questions the motives that lead people to abandon their homelands and underlines the resiliency of those who migrate to foreign lands in order to fulfill their dreams.”

=== El agua del paraíso ===
El agua del paraíso (The Waters of Paradise) is Benito Pastoriza Iyodo's first novel. The author weaves a story of four generations of women by intertwining their histories, local legend and the adversities they face. Set in the tropics, with its rivers, its waterfalls and the sea, the presentation of the tale draws the reader into the cinematic pace of the book.

=== Prostíbulo de la palabra = Brothel of the Word ===
Prostíbulo de la palabra, published in 2012, is the author's fourth book of poetry in Spanish. This first edition includes the English translation of the collection (Brothel of the Word) along with notes in bilingual format. As the title implies, the term "brothel" goes beyond the world associated with the sexual act.

=== Hominis Aurora ===
Hominis Aurora is a bilingual collection of poems published by Flowersong Press in 2021. Bradley Warren Davis translated the poems into English.

== Other publications ==
Pastoriza Iyodo collaborated with many academic and literary magazines in the United States. Literal has published his interviews of writers such as Gioconda Belli and Isaac Goldemberg, essays and book reviews. His writings have been published in the magazines: En Rojo, Línea Plural, Taller Literario, Cupey, Luz en Arte y Literatura, Los Perdedores, Mystralight, Vagamundos, Carpeta de Poesía Luz, Hofstra Hispanic Review, Visible, and Literal. His works also appear in U.S. and world anthologies: Poetic Voices Without Borders (Vols I & II), AMOR DEL MISMO SEXO, Antología internacional de la narrativa Carmen Baez, La noche y los guerreros de fuego, Con otra voz, Uno, nosotros, todos, Otro canto, Minotauro, Fronteras de lo imposible, La primavera ... la sangre altera, Plaza de los poetas José Pedroni, Narradores y Poetas en Homenaje, Antología de la narrativa de los deseos, Ejercicios de libertad, 4 letras, Antología literaria Profesor Di Marco, [des]-contar el hambre and Cuando quieres mirar a las nubes.

== Death ==
Benito Pastoriza Iyodo died at the age of 67 on August 8, 2022, at Doctors Hospital at Renaissance in Edinburg, Texas.

== See also ==
- LGBT literature
- List of Puerto Ricans
- List of gay, lesbian or bisexual people
- List of LGBT writers
- List of Puerto Rican writers
- Puerto Rican literature
- Puerto Ricans in the United States
