= Natasha Dennerstein =

Australian author

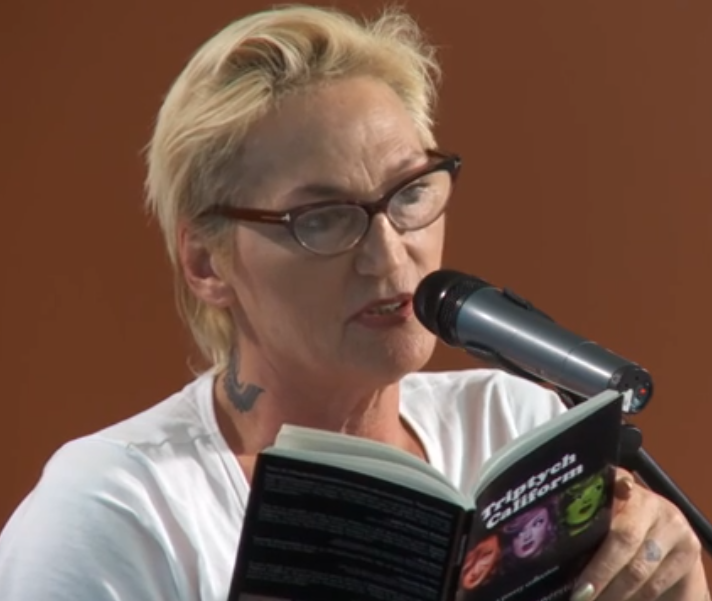
- Dennerstein in 2015
- Born: Melbourne, Australia
- Education: Whitireia Polytechnic; Victoria University of Wellington (MA); San Francisco State University (MFA)
- Occupations: Poet; Writer; Editor; Psychiatric nurse
- Writing career
- Notable works: Anatomize (2015); Triptych Caliform (2016); About a Girl (2017); Seahorse (2017)

Natasha Dennerstein is an Australian-born poet and writer. She has authored several poetry collections and a chapbook titled Seahorse in 2017. She has worked as an editor with several literary publications in the United States. Prior to her career as a writer, she worked as a psychiatric nurse.

== Early life and education ==
Natasha Dennerstein was born in Melbourne, Australia. She is of Polish–Russian ancestry, and her family migrated from Belarus. She obtained a diploma in creative writing from Whitireia Polytechnic in New Zealand. She completed her Master of Arts from the International Institute of Modern Letters at Victoria University of Wellington. She later obtained the Master of Fine Arts from San Francisco State University. She spent the early part of her career working as a psychiatric nurse. She is fluent in English and German.

== Career ==
Dennerstein has published poetry in a wide range of literary journals, including Landfall, Shenandoah, North American Review, Spoon River Poetry Review, Foglifter, Bloom, and Red Light Lit. She is the author of several poetry collections including Anatomize (2015), Triptych Caliform (2016), and About a Girl (2017), published by Norfolk Press in San Francisco. In 2017, she wrote the chapbook Seahorse (2017) based on transsexual theme and published by Nomadic Press in Oakland, California.

Dennerestin was a 2018 fellow of the Lambda Literary Writers Retreat. She collaborated with visual artist Kaye Freeman for publishing Turn and Face the Strange in 2019. In 2021, she published a 33-poem collection titled Broken: A Life of Aileen Wuornos. She has worked in independent publishing and editorial roles in the San Francisco Bay Area, including with Nomadic Press. She has also worked at St James Infirmary, a clinic for sex workers in San Francisco.

Dennerstein's poetry collection is described as the work as engaging with description of physical experience and perception through varied poetic forms, and trans identity.

== Works ==
- Anatomize (2015)
- Triptych Caliform (2016)
- About a Girl (2017)
- Seahorse (2017)
- Turn and Face the Strange (2019)
- Broken: A Life of Aileen Wuornos (2021)
