= Kathy Belge =

American writer and journalist

- Education: Syracuse University (B.A.)
- Occupations: Writer; Journalist; LGBTQ activist
- Writing career
- Notable works: Lipstick & Dipstick's Essential Guide to Lesbian Relationships (2007); Queer: The Ultimate LGBTQ Guide for Teens (2011, 2019)

Kathy Belge is an American writer and journalist known for her work on LGBTQ topics and educational writing. She is the co-author of two books–Lipstick & Dipstick's Essential Guide to Lesbian Relationships and Queer: The Ultimate LGBTQ Guide for Teens. She wrote the advice column Lipstick & Dipstick in Curve magazine for eleven years.

== Early life and career ==
Kathy Belge is from Portland, Oregon. She completed her Bachelor of Arts with a dual major in journalism and history from Syracuse University. She has worked as a freelance writer and journalist since 2003, with a focus on LGBTQ+ topics. She is an advocate for LGBTQ rights and has worked as the director of the Sexual Minority Youth Resource Center in Oregon, a program supporting LGBTQ+ teenagers.

== Writing ==
Belge wrote the advice column Lipstick & Dipstick in Curve magazine for approximately eleven years. Her first book Lipstick & Dipstick's Essential Guide to Lesbian Relationships, was co-authored with Gina Daggett, and was published by Alyson Books in 2007. The book addresses topics such as navigating the period post-breakup including coping with former partners, processing emotional challenges, and navigating sexual relationships. Belge later co-authored Queer: The Ultimate LGBTQ Guide for Teens with Marke Bieschke. The book was published by Zest Books in 2011 and later revised and expanded in 2019. The book provides guidance on topics including sexual orientation, coming out, relationships, and LGBTQ identity for teenage readers. Kirkus Reviews described the book as a combination of an informational guide covering LGBTQ topics for teens, personal stories of the authors, and life histories of historical LGBTQ personalities. However, it noted that while some sections provide useful information, the book does not reflect the language of the current generation. Publishers Weekly described the book as an accessible and supportive guide that includes personal experiences from the authors, the life histories of LGBTQ pioneers, and topics such as LGBTQ people in sports.

== Bibliography ==
- Lipstick & Dipstick's Essential Guide to Lesbian Relationships (2007)
- Queer: The Ultimate LGBTQ Guide for Teens (2011; revised 2019)
