= Josine Reuling =

Pen name of Gerardina Reuling

- Born: Gerardina Anna Reuling; 29 September 1899; Amsterdam, The Netherlands
- Died: 19 October 1961 (aged 62); Amsterdam, the Netherlands
- Occupation: writer
- Years active: 1927-1953

Josine Reuling (29 September 1899 – 19 October 1961) was the pen name of the Dutch writer, Gerardina Anna Reuling. Known for her psychological novels, her characters called into question conservative societal behaviors. Her novel Terug naar het eiland was one of the first lesbian literary works published in The Netherlands. It was unique in that it did not evaluate lesbianism on a binary trajectory or in relationship to masculinity or masculine traits. There are several streets named in her honor throughout The Netherlands.

== Early life ==
Gerardina Anna Reuling, known as Josine, was born on 29 September 1899 at #36 Daniel Stalpertstraat, Amsterdam to Anna Catharina Taatgen and Hermanus Reuling. Her parents were opera singers and left The Netherlands for Russia when Reuling was two years old. She spent most of her childhood in Russia attending various schools in Eastern Europe. Her mother was ill for much of her childhood, and Reuling helped care for her. The glimpses of her nomadic family contained in her later autobiographical works, rarely mention her father. They were forced to evacuate from Latvia at the beginning of World War I in 1914 and returned to the Netherlands.

== Career ==
When she completed her schooling, Reuling worked as a secretary for a wholesale paper producer, G. H. Bührmann and wrote in her spare time. She published her first book, Siempie (Always), in 1927. She had written it when she was 22 and much of it was based upon her own life experiences, which would be woven into all of her works. Musicians, singers, and life in foreign places are chronicled in Siempie and Senta Meloni (Look Melons, 1938). Russian characters and a mother suffering from tuberculosis appear in Sara Vierhout. An office secretary appears in Intermezzo met Ernst (Interlude with Ernst, 1934), De verwachting (The Expectation, 1948), and De jaren zijn als vogels (The Years Are Like Birds, 1951). A friendship with a Paris fashion designer is reflected in De verwachting, as well.

Because of illness, Reuling left Bührmann's and finished Sara Vierhout (1932) in Switzerland. From there, she went to France, living first in Paris and then in Tourettes, near Vence in the Provence-Alpes-Côte d'Azur region. In the 1930s, the first books about lesbianism were published in the Netherlands. As there was no lesbian subculture in the Netherlands in the period, support networks consisted of friendship circles. Within Reulings circle were Anna Blaman and Marie-Louise Doudart de la Grée. Reuling's Terug naar het eiland (Back to the Island, 1937) was among the first Dutch literary works to explore lesbian themes, as was A. H. Nijhoff's Twee meisjes en ik (Two Girls and Me, 1930). Written as an answer to The Well of Loneliness by Radclyffe Hall, the heroine, Brita, has no gender or identity crisis and rejects scientific concepts about homosexuality. Terug naar het eiland is unique, in that it rejected a depiction of lesbian desire as masculine behavior, instead championing feminine homosexual women's desire for other women.

From her first publication, Reuling received critical acclaim and was noted for her "authentic and original depictions of modern life". The publication Sara Vierhout was also well received, but as Reuling began shifting to more psychological explorations, which challenged conservative social norms, critical reception changed. Intermezzo met Ernst was criticized for depicting abnormal lifestyles and behaviors in which women characters were independent actors. When she published Terug naar het eiland, critics labeled the work as pornographic. In 1958, Dutch critic Victor E. van Vriesland called her talent for writing unique and curious, because her characters showed the visible manifestation of their psychology. Instead of exploring the psychic soul of her character, Reuling evaluated their interior through observing their experiences and external interactions in a modern context.

At the outbreak of World War II in 1940, Reuling returned to the Netherlands, but two years later was back in France, living in the Lot department near Brive-la-Gaillarde. She had undertaken the risky journey with a Jewish girlfriend who went on to Switzerland. Reuling lived in seclusion for nearly two years in Brive-la-Gaillarde, but after the Liberation of Paris in 1944, went to work at the Dutch Consulate General until it was safe to return to the Netherlands. She settled in Laren, where she wrote De verwachting and a children's book, Heks Pimpelneus (Pimplenose Witch) in 1948.

Reuling began working as a secretary to the director of the Public Reading Room in Amsterdam in 1949. The following year, with a stipend from the Ministry of Culture, she returned to France and completed her novel De jaren zijn als vogels (1951). Returning to Amsterdam, she worked for Vrij Nederland (Free Netherlands) magazine, producing the column "Bij ons in de stad" (With Us in the city), but stopped after a few months, as she didn't like the work. She published her last book, Poeder en parels (Powder and Pearls) in 1953. Her health began to decline and she stopped writing. She eventually was mentally unable to interact with her colleagues.

== Death and legacy ==
Reuling died on 19 or 21 October 1961 in Amsterdam in a care home on Van Eeghenstraat. Both Apeldoorn and Groningen have honored her with a Josine Reulingstraat (Josine Reuling Street), and Josine Reulinglaan (Josine Reuling Lane) is found in Vlissingen.

== Selected works ==
- Reuling, Josine (1927). Siempie: roman van een kind met sprietharen (in Dutch). Baarn: Hollandia. OCLC 64949992.
- Reuling, Josine (1932). Sara Vierhout (in Dutch). Rotterdam: Nijgh & Van Ditmar. OCLC 63979867.
- Reuling, Josine (1934). Intermezzo met Ernst (in Dutch). Rotterdam: Nijgh & Van Ditmar. OCLC 65141854.
- Reuling, Josine (1937). Terug naar het eiland (in Dutch). Antwerpen: Nederlandsche Boekhandel. OCLC 902369785.
- Reuling, Josine (1938). Senta Meloni, lerares solozang (in Dutch). Amsterdam: Querido. OCLC 69349057.
- Reuling, Josine (1939). Het vreemde vaderland (in Dutch). Amsterdam: Querido. OCLC 902369809.
- Reuling, Josine (1941). De heilige van St. Jean (in Dutch). Amsterdam: Querido. OCLC 906745187.
- Reuling, Josine (1946). Paulientje's reis naar dierenland (in Dutch). Amsterdam: Querido. OCLC 63817493.
- Reuling, Josine (1948). De verwachting (in Dutch). Amsterdam: Querido. OCLC 906378608.
- Reuling, Josine (1949). Heks Pimpelneus (in Dutch). Amsterdam: Querido. OCLC 63817491.
- Reuling, Josine (1951). De jaren zijn als vogels (in Dutch). Amsterdam: Querido. OCLC 902369782.
- Reuling, Josine (1953). Poeder en parels (in Dutch). Utrecht: A. W. Bruna & Zoon. OCLC 7144771.
