= Richard Teleky =

Canadian writer and academic (born 1946)

Richard Paul Teleky (born 1946) is a Canadian writer and academic, currently a professor in the Humanities Department at York University in Toronto, Ontario. His primary research areas include Central European literature, ethnic studies/immigrant literature, early modernist writing, and film and contemporary culture, as well as the creative process.

== Background ==
Teleky was born in Cleveland, Ohio, and later received his B.A. from Case-Western Reserve University in 1968. That year he moved to Canada on a Woodrow Wilson Fellowship so that he could study at the University of Toronto. He received an M.A. in English in 1969, and a Ph.D. in English in 1973. His doctoral thesis, The Literary Significance of The Golden Bough, focused on the impact of Victorian anthropology, myth studies, and the work of Sir James Frazer on modernist literature.

== Career ==
He taught at York University from 1972 to 1975, served as a research consultant for the Department of Education of the Art Gallery of Ontario, and made a career in publishing at Oxford University Press Canada, where he was senior editor and then managing editor from 1976 to 1991. At Oxford University Press Canada, Teleky had his own series, Studies in Canadian Literature. As editor of this series, Teleky worked with many of Canada's leading literary and academic writers, commissioning and editing books on a wide range of subjects. One of his most noted projects was Adele Wiseman's essay collection Memoirs of a Book Molesting Childhood. During those years he often taught part-time for the English Department of the University of Toronto at Erindale College and Woodsworth College.

In 1991 he returned to academic life as a professor in the Humanities Department of York University, where he became administrator of the undergraduate creative writing program for a decade. He now focuses on interdisciplinary courses, and has taught courses as a part of several different graduate programs at York, and as Adjunct Faculty at the McGregor School/Graduate Studies of Antioch University in Yellow Springs, Ohio. For nearly twenty years he was also an adjudicator for the Banff Centre writing program in Banff, Alberta.

He published the short story collection Goodnight, Sweetheart and Other Stories in 1993, and his debut novel The Paris Years of Rosie Kamin followed in 1998. It was named one of the best books of the year by Philadelphia Inquirer and the Toronto Star, and won the prestigious American Harold Ribalow Prize for the best novel of the year. He has since published two further novels, two poetry collections and several works of non-fiction.

== Books ==
Fiction

- Goodnight, Sweetheart and Other Stories (1993)
- The Paris Years of Rosie Kamin (1998)
- Pack Up the Moon (2003)
- Winter in Hollywood (2006)
- The Blue Hour (2017)

Poetry

- The Hermit's Kiss (2006)
- Hermit in Arcadia (2011)

Non-Fiction

- Hungarian Rhapsodies: Essays on Ethnicity, Identity and Culture (1997)
- The Dog on the Bed: A Canine Alphabet (2011)
- Ordinary Paradise: Essays on Art and Culture (2017)

Anthologies

- The Oxford Book of French-Canadian Short Stories (1984)
- The Exile Book of Canadian Dog Stories (2010)
