= Kimball Allen =

American dramatist

Kimball Baden Allen
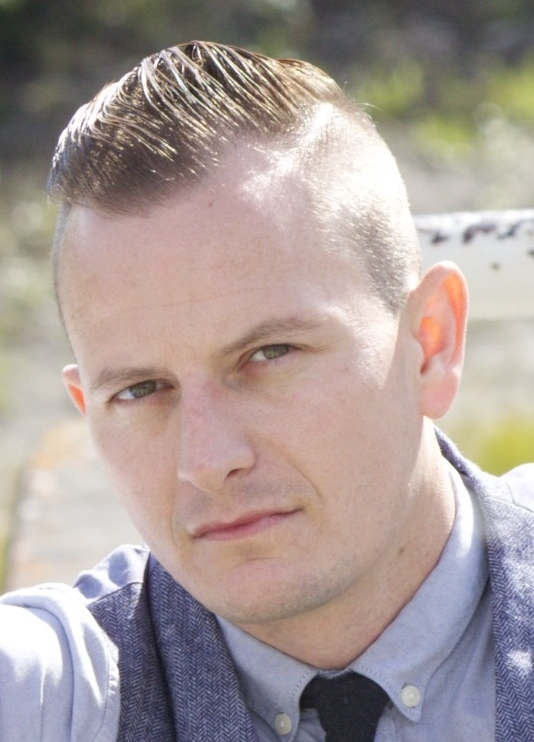
- Born: February 22, 1982 (age 44); Blackfoot, Idaho, U.S.
- Occupations: Writer, performer
- Known for: Secrets of a Gay Mormon Felon; Be Happy Be Mormon; Triple Threat w/ Kimball Allen
- Spouse: Scott Wells (m. 2016)

Kimball Allen (born February 22, 1982) is an American writer, journalist, playwright, and actor. He is the author of two autobiographical one-man plays: Secrets of a Gay Mormon Felon (2012) and Be Happy Be Mormon (2014). The latter premiered at Theatre Row in Manhattan on September 24 and 27, 2014, as part of the United Solo Theatre Festival. From 2015 to 2017 he hosted the recurring Triple Threat w/ Kimball Allen, a 90-minute variety talk show at The Triple Door in Seattle.

== Secrets of a Gay Mormon Felon ==
Secrets of a Gay Mormon Felon is an autobiographical one-man play written and performed by Allen. In it, he reenacts the circumstances of his life that led him from a Mormon childhood through a life of addiction and, eventually, arrest.

Allen was born and grew up in Blackfoot, Idaho, a religious, conservative region, and he was one of eight children in an orthodox Mormon family. Even when he was small, his strict Mormon parents were concerned by what they perceived as unusual behavior and mannerisms on his part, and his mother preemptively warned him, "Boys don't kiss boys."

At the age of 13, he was raped by an older man who befriended him at a mall. To cope with this trauma, which he could not tell anyone about, he surreptitiously turned to alcohol, and eventually drugs. He began living a double life – a devout Mormon on the surface, and underneath a teen struggling with his sexual orientation, the rape trauma, and his growing addictions.

Allen's family moved to Utah, the most heavily Mormon state in the U.S., when he was in his junior year of high school. He came out to his parents as gay when he was 19. His parents responded that they couldn't support him in that capacity and that they were repulsed by him. According to Allen, coming out as gay in the Mormon community was "committing social suicide", and he has also written that "I grew up gay in a loving, supportive Mormon family. When I came out, that love and support disappeared."

In adulthood, his drug addictions spiraled further into cocaine, acid, and E, and eventually into a shopping addiction which led him to crave the high of larger and larger purchases. Given responsibility for a corporate credit card, he accidentally used it for a small expense of his own in 2010, and then started addictively embezzling the company's funds for luxuries via the card. The missing funds, totalling around $70,000, were noticed in 2011, and Allen landed in jail awaiting trial. He went through detox in the jail cell, and out of desperation began journal writing to make sense of how he ended up in that situation.

After admitting to his crimes and making reparations, coming to terms with his addictions, and realizing he needed help, Allen continued his journaling during his recovery process. A coherent narrative eventually took shape, and the self-examination eventually became a script, with the additional help of many hours viewing home videos of himself as a child.

The completed play, Secrets of a Gay Mormon Felon, premiered in Kansas City in the summer of 2012. It has also run in Honolulu and San Diego.

A KC Stage reviewer of the play wrote, "I was skeptical about how engaging an hour long, one-man play ... could be. Fortunately, playwright, actor, and subject matter Kimball Allen possesses the assets of colorful material in his life story, a gift for story-telling, and a charisma that drew in the audience from beginning to end. ... The audience is swept up in his story while also discovering parallels in their own lives, places where they have tried to live up to standards and rules that are unrealistic or unhealthy."

LA Splash wrote that "Through his play Secrets of a Gay Mormon Felon, fascinating Seattle playwright Kimball Allen has found unexpected relief in reenacting painful moments from his life and sharing their impact with his audience. ... He finds the comparisons to essayist and fellow non-fiction funny-man David Sedaris to be an honor but what he finds most rewarding is the connection he makes with the audience on stage." Allen has stated, "I want everyone to leave with a different perspective, but to understand that children are fragile, and when you raise a child there is a domino effect."

Ecumenica Journal called Secrets of a Gay Mormon Felon "a mix of deeply personal confession and performance art". It went on to note that Allen's new theater work written after this play continues to explore "controversial topics and taboos within his former religion and his personal life".

== Be Happy Be Mormon ==
Allen's second one-man play, the one-hour Be Happy Be Mormon, premiered at Theatre Row in Manhattan on September 24, 2014, as part of the United Solo Theatre Festival, and due to the sold-out premiere it had a second performance on September 27. It previewed on September 4 and 5, 2014 in Seattle. It is described as "A voyeuristic look into the childhood of a Bambi-loving vegetarian, ballet slipper-wearing, Diet Coke-drinking gay Mormon Boy Scout." The play relates his upbringing "as a fabulous black sheep" in a Mormon family he doesn't relate to, through "colorful narration, private home movies, songs, dance and the occasional acrobatics". He has stated that the inspiration for the show came when he read a lengthy letter his mother wrote before he was born, anticipating his birth and also his life and hoped-for achievements in the Mormon faith – achievements which he never fulfilled because of his true nature.

In August 2014 Allen, who is an ex-Mormon, presented excerpts from and commentary on Be Happy Be Mormon, plus a question and answer session, at the 2014 Sunstone Symposium, an annual gathering of Mormons, scholars, and others interested in the diversity and richness of Mormon thought and experience.

== Triple Threat w/ Kimball Allen ==
On April 3, 2015, Allen presented and hosted Triple Threat w/ Kimball Allen, a 90-minute variety talk show, at The Triple Door in Seattle. The lineup included a wide variety of local Seattle performers, entertainers, and celebrities, including author and activist Dan Savage and the Seattle Men's Chorus. Reviewing the show in the West Seattle Herald, Amanda Knox wrote that "Allen was as much a grateful host as a gleeful groupie, ever-ready and willing to make his party as much fun for his guest talent as for the audience." Matt Baume in Seattle Gay Scene wrote "It's like a talent show, but with actual talent. From his hosting station behind a desk, Kimball rotates through a grab bag of local performers like a star-studded episode of The Tonight Show." Both Knox and Baume said they looked forward to future installments of the stage show.

The second Triple Threat w/ Kimball Allen was on August 28, 2015. The lineup of celebrities, entertainers, comedians, and musical performers included rock-music radio personality Marco Collins, and Daniel Blue, frontman of local Washington band Motopony. Seattle Gay Scene described Allen as "Seattle's very own version of Johnny Carson". The third installment of Triple Threat took place on March 31, 2016, and was headlined by Emmy-winning actor and comedian Leslie Jordan.

In 2017, in light of the current U.S. presidency, the producers added a more activist slant to the show, and the decision was also made to thenceforth donate all proceeds of each show to a non-profit. The lineup of the March 2017 show included a spokesperson for Planned Parenthood in addition to Seattle comedians and musicians, and all proceeds from the show went to Planned Parenthood. The July 2017 show included filmmaker Wes Hurley and "boylesque" performer Waxie Moon, and all proceeds went to the Vanderpump Dog Foundation.

== Additional writings, performances, and activism ==
Allen has written an opinion piece for the New York Times. In the article, he talks about "the negative effects religion can have, particularly when the individual doesn't fit into the dogmatic mold", and the spiral of addictions his unresolved resentment and anger led him to. He also discusses the familial, social, community, and religious repercussions of his coming out, which forever affected his ability to interact freely with his Mormon community.

For Edge Seattle, Allen's articles have included interviews with Jewel and Brian McKnight. He has also reviewed Sister Act: The Musical, Other Desert Cities, An Evening with Brian McKnight, Jewel's Greatest Hits Tour, and Bumbershoot.

For Capitol Hill Times, he has interviewed John Densmore and Ron Jeremy. He has also reported on various local arts and political issues and Seattle's gay scene.

In 2013, he taught workshops on "Discover Your Proud Voice Through Performance" at the annual conference of True Colors, a large non-profit conference which mentors LGBT youth. He also appears in the "No More Fear" video, a part of the "AIDS Is Going to Lose" PSA project.

He has also done additional performing. In 2014 in Seattle he performed at Mortified Live, and at A Guide To Visitors—The Best of Stories On Stage. In November 2015 he performed a monologue in "Arctic Entries" for Alaska Public Media in Anchorage, where he had previously resided, and in March 2018 he performed in Phoenix, Arizona at a revue called Arizona Storytellers: Stylish Stories.

In January 2017, Allen and his husband, who had both obtained 2017 Presidential Inauguration tickets in October 2016 expecting Hillary Clinton to win, attended the inauguration of Donald Trump. After the couple's disappointment over the election results, Allen came to feel that attending the inauguration, holding his husband's hand, was an important way to represent out, proud gay couples in America, and that doing so was their way of protesting and of holding Trump accountable.

Following a move to Scottsdale, Arizona, Allen began hosting a series of what he calls Casa Concerts, featuring local and touring musicians and comedians, in his home each month beginning in November 2017.

== Personal life ==
Allen lived for many years in the Capitol Hill neighborhood of Seattle. He married Scott Wells in October 2016. As of late 2017, they live in Scottsdale, Arizona.

He is an Eagle Scout.
