= Terre Haute (novel) =

1989 novel by Will Aitken

- Author: Will Aitken
- Language: English
- Genre: Novel
- Publisher: Gay Men's Press
- Publication date: 1989
- Publication place: United States; Canada
- Media type: Paperback
- Pages: 288 pp
- ISBN: 0-85449-131-7
- OCLC: 27223996

Terre Haute is a 1989 novel by Will Aitken.

Terre Haute describes a year in the life of fourteen-year-old Jared McCaverty, a bright and attractive young boy going through puberty in Terre Haute, Indiana. Jared, who comes from a wealthy family, is many ways a happy boy, but he is overweight, socially awkward, and gay.

== Plot summary ==
Jared McCaverty has a sexual encounter with a friend, Paul Herzog, but his father finds out and beats him. He buys a gay magazine, but his father finds it and cannot accept his son's sexual inclinations. He then has another homosexual episode with Randy Sparks, a school friend, but his father discovers them having sex in Jared's bedroom.

Jared meets Julian Clay, the new curator of the local museum, and a sexually abusive relationship ensues. Jared faces rejection by Julian and threatens him.

Julian Clay then commits suicide. It is likely that he did so because Jared threatened to expose him as a pedophile and a rapist, and Jared blames himself for Julian's death. In the closing pages, Jared meets Alexandre, a sympathetic twenty-year-old Frenchman, and the reader is led to believe that Jared will have found true love.
