= K. M. Soehnlein =

American novelist

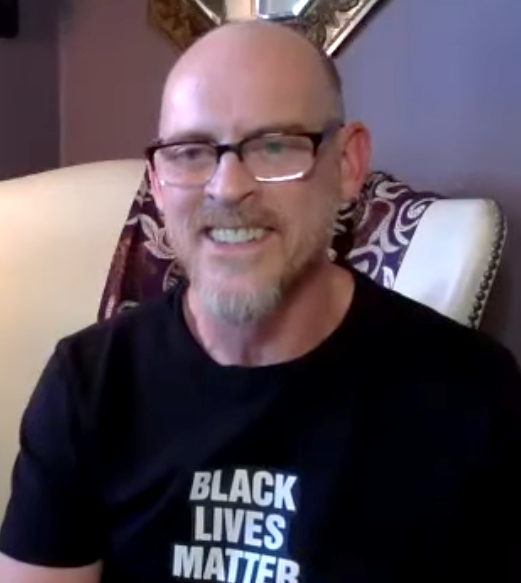
- In an online discussion in 2020
- Born: Karl M. Soehnlein; November 24, 1965 (age 60); New York, New York, US
- Occupation: Writer
- Spouse: Kevin Clarke (m. 2015)

Karl M. Soehnlein (born November 24, 1965) is the American author of the novels The World of Normal Boys (2000), a 1970s coming-of-age story that won the Lambda Literary Award for Gay Men's Fiction; You Can Say You Knew Me When (2005), set in San Francisco during the Beat era of 1960 and the dot-com boom of 2000; and Robin and Ruby (2010), which follows the brother and sister characters of The World of Normal Boys into the mid-1980s.

His latest novel Army of Lovers was published in October 2022 by Amble Press, an imprint of Bywater Books. It follows a young gay man swept up in the excitement, fury, and poignancy of the AIDS activist group ACT UP/New York, of which Soehnlein was an early member, beginning in 1987.

== Biography ==
Soehnlein was born in New York City, the son of an Irish immigrant mother and a first-generation German-American father. He was raised in Westwood, New Jersey and attended Ithaca College, where he majored in Cinema Production, graduating in 1987.

After several years in New York City, he moved to San Francisco in 1992 to attend San Francisco State University, where he received an MFA in Creative Writing.

From 1997-2003 he played clarinet with the Cubby Creatures, a rock band, and participated in the art collective The Cubby.

He has been a member of the faculty at the University of San Francisco, MFA in Writing Program, since 2002, teaching courses in fiction writing.

Early in his writing career he published short stories in queer literary journals including The James White Review, Modern Words, and Lodestar Quarterly.

In addition he has published personal essays in the anthologies: Who's Yer Daddy: Gay Writers Celebrate their Mentors and Forerunners (winner of the Lambda Award for Best LGBTQ Anthology, 2014); Girls Who Like Boys Who Like Boys; Love, Castro Street; From Boys to Men: Gay Men Write about Growing Up; and Bookmark Now: Writers in Unreaderly Times.

His journalism has appeared in Queerty, Out, Village Voice, San Francisco Magazine, 7x7, and San Francisco Bay Guardian.

He was a frequent contributor to the influential 1980s queer weekly newsmagazine Outweek.

== Film work ==
Soehnlein's short films screened at the New York Lesbian and Gay Experimental Film Festival, later the MIX Festival. He was the co-writer of Jack Walsh's 1995 experimental feature The Second Coming.

From 1995–1999, he worked at Film Arts Foundation in San Francisco serving as an editor of Release Print magazine, for which he interviewed numerous film directors including Steven Soderbergh, Richard Linklater, D. A. Pennebaker, Derek Jarman, and Lisa Cholodenko.

In 2017, with co-writer Aron Kantor, he received a Rainin Grant in Screenwriting from SFFILM for a feature script in development, The Continental, about the Continental Baths in New York City.

== Activism ==
In 1987, Soehnlein and his then boyfriend Alan Klein attended their first meeting of ACT UP/New York, the influential AIDS activist group. Soehnlein facilitated meetings, helped organized demonstrations, and took part in nonviolent civil disobedience demonstrations, getting arrested multiple times. His novel Army of Lovers fictionalizes the years he spent involved with ACT UP.

In 2003, Soehnlein was interviewed by Sarah Schulman for the ACT UP Oral History Project about his years in ACT UP. Schulman included excerpts from that interview in her nonfiction book Let The Record Show: A Political History of ACT UP New York, 1987-1993. An excerpt from that interview also appears in Jean Carlomusto's HBO documentary about Larry Kramer, Larry Kramer: In Love and Anger.

Soehnlein's ACT UP participation is also mentioned in Peter Staley's memoir Never Silent: ACT UP and My Life in Activism.

In 1990, along with writer Michelangelo Signorile and activists Alan Klein and Tom Blewitt, Soehnlein was part of the original meeting that led to the founding of Queer Nation, an activist group challenging homophobia in the media and the rise of anti-queer assaults in New York City. The group quickly established chapters all over the U.S. and the world.

Soehnlein was prompted to found Queer Nation after being the victim of an anti-gay assault at the Wigstock festival in Tompkins Square Park in 1989.

Following the mass shooting at the queer nightclub Pulse, in Orlando Florida in June 2016, Soehnlein launched the viral campaign #TwoMenKissing.

== Personal life ==
Soehnlein lives in San Francisco with his husband Kevin Clarke. While they have been legally married since 2015, they originally exchanged vows at a commitment ceremony in San Francisco circa 2009 that was featured in The New York Times weddings section.

== Bibliography ==
- 2000: The World of Normal Boys
- 2005: You Can Say You Knew Me When
- 2010: Robin and Ruby
- 2022: Army of Lovers
