= Mark Brennan Rosenberg =

Mark Brennan Rosenberg is an out gay author and comedian based in New York City. He is the author of two books thorough through Crown Publishing, Blackouts and Breakdowns, which was released in 2011, and Eating My Feelings: Tales of Overeating, Underperforming, and Coping with My Crazy Family which was released in, 2013. Rosenberg's writings and commentary focus on the issues that affect the lesbian, gay, bisexual, and transgender community; particularly alcohol addiction and substance abuse, which he discusses heavily in his first book. Rosenberg has been sober since 2008.

As of 2013 he is a contributor for HuffPost.

In 2012, Rosenberg released his first book Blackouts and Breakdowns, which he promoted with a nationwide tour. In late 2013 he released his second book, Eating My Feelings. Rosenberg's first novel ,This Made Me Think of You, was released on April 5, 2016. It follows a couple's breakup over the course of a year solely through their social media, text and email exchanges.
