= Will Aitken =

American-Canadian writer

- Born: Terre Haute, Indiana
- Education: McGill University
- Occupations: Film critic, novelist
- Writing career
- Language: English
- Notable work: Terre Haute (1989)

Will Aitken is an American-Canadian novelist, journalist and film critic. Originally from Terre Haute, Indiana, he has been based in Montreal, Quebec since moving to that city to attend McGill University in 1972.

In Montreal, he was a cofounder of the city's first LGBT bookstore, Librairie L'Androgyne, in 1973. He has also worked as an arts journalist and film critic for a variety of media outlets, including the CBC, the BBC, NPR, The Globe and Mail, Maclean's, The Paris Review, Christopher Street and the National Post.

He published his first novel, Terre Haute, in 1989. He has since published three other novels.

He taught film studies at Dawson College in Montreal. In 2011, he published Death in Venice: A Queer Film Classic, a critical analysis of Luchino Visconti's 1971 film Death in Venice, as part of Arsenal Pulp Press's Queer Film Classics series.

His 2018 book, Antigone Undone: Juliette Binoche, Anne Carson, Ivo Van Hove and the Art of Resistance, was published by University of Regina Press. The book was a finalist for the 2018 Hilary Weston Writers' Trust Prize for Nonfiction.

== Works ==
=== Novels ===
- Terre Haute. 1989, ISBN 978-0385298728.
- A Visit Home. 1993, ISBN 978-0671747077.
- Realia. 2000, ISBN 978-0679310402.
- The Swells. 2021, ISBN 978-1487009694.

=== Non-fiction ===
- Death in Venice: A Queer Film Classic. 2011, ISBN 978-1551524184.
- Antigone Undone: Juliette Binoche, Anne Carson, Ivo Van Hove, and the Art of Resistance. 2018, ISBN 978-0889775213.

=== Anthologies ===
- Madder Love: Queer Men and the Precincts of Surrealism (ed. Peter Dubé). 2008.
