= Keith Banner =

American writer

Keith Banner is an American writer, whose 2014 collection Next to Nothing: Stories was a shortlisted nominee for the Lambda Literary Award for Gay Fiction at the 27th Lambda Literary Awards in 2015.

== Works ==
His prior publications include the novel The Life I Lead (1999) and the short story collection The Smallest People Alive (2004). His short stories have also been published in numerous anthologies and literary magazines.

== Personal life ==
Banner lives in Cincinnati, Ohio, with his partner Bill Ross, where he works as a social worker and a director of non-profit arts agencies.
