= Willyce Kim =

American writer (born 1946)

- Born: February 18, 1946 (age 80); Honolulu, Hawaii, United States
- Occupations: Poet, novelist

Willyce Kim (born 1946) is an American writer. She is generally recognized to be the first openly-lesbian, Asian American poet to be published in the United States. Kim published her first book of poetry in 1971 and continued to publish poetry and novels throughout the 1970s and 1980s. She also contributed to a number of lesbian literary reviews throughout this time period. Her work is characterized by its celebration of lesbianism, strong women, and queer kinship.

== Early life and education ==
Willyce Kim was born in 1946 in Honolulu, Hawaii, to Korean American parents. Raised Catholic, Kim attended Catholic schools, graduating with a degree in English literature in 1968 from San Francisco College of Women (later becoming Lone Mountain College, which, in turn, was eventually acquired by the University of San Francisco). While at San Francisco College of Women, Kim served as editor of Tradewinds, the campus literary magazine.

== Career ==
Kim was an early member of the Women's Press Collective, an Oakland-based collective that facilitated the printing and distribution of self-published books by lesbians. Kim's later works were published by Alyson Publications, a Boston-based publisher specializing in LGBT literature. Kim's work also appeared in literary journals such as Women's Press, Everywoman, Furies, Plexus, Sinister Wisdom, Conditions Ten, IKON, and Phoenix Rising.

Throughout the 1970s and into the 1980s, Kim participated in readings and open mics along with other Bay Area poets including Pat Parker and Kitty Tsui. Among the venues where Kim read were A Woman's Place bookstore in Oakland, Scott's, a lesbian biker bar in San Francisco's Castro district, Modern Times Bookstore in San Francisco, Ollie's in Oakland, and A Different Light, an LGBT bookstore in San Francisco.

Kim's work has influenced writers such as Alexander Chee, Merle Woo, and R.O. Kwon and has been reviewed both in the LGBTQ press and the mainstream press.

In 1985, Kim began working in the library at UC Berkeley where she served in a variety of supervisory positions in Doe Library for 25 years.

Kim's 1985 novel Dancer Dawkins and the California Kid was re-issued by the University of Washington Press in 2023 as part of their Classics in Asian American Literature series. It includes a foreword by Eunsong Kim, an associate professor of English at Northeastern University.

== Personal life ==
Kim has lived in Oakland, California, since the early 1970s.

== Works ==
=== Poetry ===
- 1971: Curtains of Light. With illustrations by Carmel Kim. Self-published.
- 1972: Eating Artichokes. Poems by Willyce Kim with photographs by Willyce Kim and Wendy Cadden. Published by Woman's Press Collective.
- 1976: Under the Rolling Sky. Published by Maud Gonne Press.
- 2023: Places. Poem-a-day in poets.org, September 1, 2023.

=== Fiction ===
- 1985: Dancer Dawkins and the California Kid. Alyson Publications.
- 1988: Dead Heat. Alyson Publications.

=== Anthologies and collections ===
(partial list)

- 1972: "Look I’m Huddled On Your Doorstep." Amazon Quarterly 1(3): 45.
- 1981: "A Woman’s Tribal Belt" and "Keeping Still, Mountain." In Lesbian Poetry, an Anthology: 157–158.
- 1984: "In This Heat ...," "Home Coming," and "Touching Bottom and Pushing Out." IKON 2(3): 74–5.
- 1986: "In This Heat ..." Contact II Winter/Spring 1986.
- 1990: excerpt from Dead Heat. In Women on Women: An Anthology of American Lesbian Short Fiction: 263–70
- 1995: "In This Heat..." and "Home Coming." In Premonitions: the Kaya Anthology of New Asian North American Poetry: 168–17.
- 2000: "Myrmidon Grief" and "Flagstones." Harrington Lesbian Fiction Quarterly 1 (1): 141–42.
- 2001: excerpt from Dancer Dawkins and the California Kid. In Kori: the Beacon Anthology of Korean American Fiction: 220–25
- 2002: "Passages." (short story) Harrington Lesbian Fiction Quarterly 2 (4): 41–51.
