= Ken Shakin =

American novelist (born 1959)

Ken Shakin (born 1959 in New York City) is an American writer of underground transgressive fiction.

"Love Sucks" was first published in 1997 by Gay Men's Press, a pioneer in LGBT fiction, and "The Cure For Sodomy" in 2006 by Haworth Press. "Grandma Gets Laid" (The Permanent Press 2008) was translated into Russian (Centrepolygraf 2009). Stories from "Real Men Ride Horses" (Gay Men's Press 1999) appear in the anthologies "All Boys Together" (Millivres-Prowler 2000) and "Latter Gay Saints" (Lethe Press 2013).

Shakin graduated from the Juilliard School in 1981 with a degree in piano. His vocal compositions have been performed in a variety of venues. The Wandering, an opera based on James Joyce's Ulysses, was first presented by the Irish Embassy in Berlin for Bloomsday 2017. In 2018 the opera was staged at the Ehemaliges Stummfilmkino Delphi, with art direction by Tim Roeloffs.

== Notes and references ==
"Shakin's darkly humorous and perverse works have earned him an underground following, largely because he flaunts every standard of decency." -Contemporary Authors

== Books ==
- "Love Sucks" Gay Men's Press 1997, Lethe Press 2009
- "Real Men Ride Horses" Gay Men's Press 1999, Lethe Press 2009
- "The Cure For Sodomy" Haworth Press 2006, Fanny Press 2010
- "Grandma Gets Laid" The Permanent Press 2008
- "Thrillerotica" Damnation Books 2010
- "Fucked: The Gay Lives of Straight Men" Lethe Press 2014
