= The Life I Lead (novel) =

1999 novel by Keith Banner

- First edition cover
- Author: Keith Banner
- Language: English
- Genre: Novel
- Publisher: Alfred A. Knopf
- Publication date: 1999
- Publication place: United States
- Media type: Hardback and paperback
- Pages: 262 pp (hardback edition)
- ISBN: 0-375-40376-0 (hardback edition)

The Life I Lead is the debut novel of Keith Banner. It tells the story of David Brewer, a husband and father who leads a secret life: he is a pedophile who has been molesting young boys for years. He evades capture by telling his victims he loves them and that he will kill himself if they tell.

The novel is written from Dave’s point of view as well as that of his wife, his father and a childhood neighbor, Troy Wetzel, who sexually abused Dave. The Wetzels moved away when his mother discovered the molestation.

Dave focuses his attention on one particular boy, Nathan Marcum, and engineers an opportunity to talk to him. He discovers that Nathan is there without adult supervision and one day, when the boy cuts himself, Dave takes him away to a rented motel room where he bandages his cut, but does not go as far as abusing him.

Dave is a churchgoing Baptist and persuades the pastor that the Marcums might join the church. They visit Nathan’s parents and Nathan later asks if he can go. Dave drives the church bus and after dropping off the other people, Dave drives Nathan in the bus out into the country. He starts to get undressed, but relents and takes Nathan home. On a second occasion, however, he abuses the boy, almost strangling him. Nathan escapes and runs away where he is picked up by a passing couple. Dave can finally accept what he is after he is arrested.

== Critical reception ==
In a review for The New York Times, Peter Kurth wrote: "Banner has artfully superimposed the blandest details of middle American life on caverns of horror and desperate grief."
