= The World of Normal Boys =

2001 debut novel by K.M. Soehnlein (Karl Soehnlein)

- Author: K.M. Soehnlein (Karl Soehnlein)
- Language: English
- Genre: Gay fiction
- Publisher: Kensington Books
- Publication date: Hardcover; September 8, 2000; Paperback; August 1, 2001
- Publication place: United States
- Media type: Print (Hardcover and Paperback)
- Pages: 282 pp (United States paperback first edition)
- ISBN: 1-57566-661-8
- OCLC: 59530592

The World of Normal Boys, published in 2001, is the debut novel of K.M. Soehnlein (Karl Soehnlein). The coming-of-age story centers on 13-year-old Robin MacKenzie, who discovers that he is unlike most other adolescent males. The book became a San Francisco Chronicle bestseller and won the Lambda Literary Award.

== Plot ==
The book is written in the present tense. It's 1978, New Jersey: Saturday Night Fever and Grease are big. 13-year-old Robin MacKenzie is caught in a triangular relationship with next-door neighbor Todd Spicer and classmate Scott Schatz.

Robin develops a fascination for 17-year-old neighbor Todd who, despite often teasing him, initiates a sexual relationship with the younger boy, whom Todd invites to a party after which they go swimming on a golf course. Robin further forms a close bond with fellow freshman Scott Schatz, whose father is physically abusive. Robin learns that, two years earlier, Todd and Scott were involved in a sexual relationship. Robin is troubled by this, but his relationship with Scott is ultimately unaffected.

During the novel, Robin's younger brother Jackson dies some time after falling from a slide and breaking his neck, an incident Robin blames himself for although it isn't anyone's fault. As a result, Robin's family begins to break down: his father becomes violent towards Robin, and Robin's longstanding bond with his mother begins to be affected. His younger sister Ruby becomes religious and also closer to Robin.

== Characters ==
=== Main ===
MacKenzie

- Robin MacKenzie – A 13-year-old boy, just entering high school, coming to terms with his sexuality and a terrifying accident involving his brother.
- Jackson MacKenzie – Robin's adventurous 11-year-old younger brother who falls from a slide, an incident that puts the family in turmoil
- Ruby MacKenzie – Robin's 12-year-old sister, after the accident, she becomes religious and closer to Robin as he protects her from their bullying cousin, Larry
- Dorothy McKenzie – Robin, Ruby, and Jackson's mom; she takes Robin on "City Days" where they spend a day in New York City
- Clark McKenzie – Robin, Ruby, and Jackson's dad; he tries to spend time with Robin, although Robin would rather do so with his mother, so Clark spends his time with Jackson; he has what is probably the hardest time with Jackson's accident
- Larry – Robin, Ruby, and Jackson's oafish cousin, who loves teasing Ruby and provoking Robin
- Corinne – Robin, Ruby, and Jackson's kindly aunt; Stan's wife, whom he regularly verbally abuses, and Larry's mom
- Stan – Robin, Ruby, and Jackson's loud and obnoxious uncle; Larry's dad; he inadvertently gets Dorothy drunk at a Super Bowl party

Spicer

- Todd Spicer – Robin's 17-year-old next-door neighbor and Victoria's older brother
- Victoria Spicer – Todd's cute younger sister, whom Robin shares a friendship. The two share a love of Grease, Saturday Night Fever, and Mork and Mindy
- Mr. Spicer – Todd and Victoria's dad; unseen character who, as Victoria once said, "beat the shit out of Todd" when Todd wanted to quit school
- Mrs. Spicer – Todd and Victoria's mom; also unseen, but known to be picky about cleanliness

Schatz

- Scott Schatz – One of Robin's classmates whom Robin becomes infatuated with
- Daniel Schatz – Scott's late brother, whose death he blames on himself
- Mr. Schatz – Scott's dad, abusive towards Scott
- Mrs. Schatz – Scott's mom, who is living in a mental institution

=== Supporting ===
- Mr. Cortez – The school guidance counselor
- Billy Danniman – One of Robin and Scott's classmates. Regularly bullies Robin. Has the nickname "Long Dong" Danniman
- Seth Carter – Another of Robin and Scott's classmates; a friend of Danniman
- Ethan – One of Todd's friends
- Tully – Another of Todd's friends
- Debbie Staley – A girl whom is rumored that Todd has impregnated
