= Arsenal Pulp Press =

Canadian independent book publishing company

- Founded: 1971; 55 years ago
- Country of origin: Canada
- Headquarters location: Vancouver, British Columbia
- Distribution: University of Toronto Press Distribution (Canada); Consortium (US); Turnaround Publisher Services (Europe); New South Books (Australasia)
- Publication types: Books
- Official website: www.arsenalpulp.com

Arsenal Pulp Press is a Canadian independent book publishing company, based in Vancouver, British Columbia. The company publishes a broad range of titles in both fiction and non-fiction, focusing primarily on underrepresented genres such as underground literature, LGBT literature, multiracial literature, graphic novels, visual arts, progressive and activist non-fiction and works in translation, and is noted for founding the annual Three-Day Novel Contest.

== History ==
Established in 1971, Scriveners' Pulp Press Limited was one of several ventures in alternative arts and literature of the early 1970s. In addition to fiction, poetry and drama titles the press issued a twice-monthly literary magazine, Three-Cent Pulp, from 1972 to 1978, which introduced a loyal readership to new writing and graphics from around the world. In 1977 Pulp held its first Three-Day Novel Contest, a literary marathon held over the Labour Day weekend during which registered contestants attempted to write a novel in three days. Pulp Press sponsored the event until 1991.

The press is located in Vancouver, BC in the city's historic Chinatown district, and employs a full-time staff of six. In 2012 it had five employees. Its main specialty is LGBT literature and nonfiction; as of 2012 it no longer specialized in comics.

Arsenal Pulp Press publisher Brian Lam (co-owner of the press since 1992) has been honoured with multiple professional awards for his significant contributions to LGBTQ2s+ and BIPOC publishing in North America. In 2014 he won the Community Builder Award from the Asian Canadian Writers' Workshop. In 2018, Lam received the Ivy Award from the Toronto International Festival of Authors. In 2020, Lam was awarded the Lambda Literary Publishing Professional Award.

In the fall of 2011 Arsenal Pulp Press celebrated its 40th anniversary. The press celebrated its 50th anniversary in the fall of 2021.

In March 2021, Arsenal Pulp Press became the first Canadian small press publisher to have two books make the finale of CBC Canada Reads, Canada's national "battle of the books." The novel Jonny Appleseed by Joshua Whitehead, championed by actor Kawennáhere Devery Jacobs won the competition, beating the novel Butter Honey Pig Bread by Francesca Ekwuyasi, defended by celebrity chef Roger Mooking.

== Writers ==
Authors who have been published by Arsenal Pulp include:

- Angie Abdou
- Will Aitken
- Richard Amory
- Merida Anderson
- Allan Antliff
- Aaron Ash
- Mette Bach
- Tanya Barnard
- John Barton
- S. Bear Bergman
- Cicely Belle Blain
- Marusya Bociurkiw
- Dennis E. Bolen
- Michael Bronski
- Carellin Brooks
- Clint Burnham
- Nick Burns
- Dreena Burton
- Patrick Califia
- Anna Camilleri
- David Campion
- Claudia Casper
- Aaron Chapman
- David L. Chapman
- David Chariandy
- Corinna Chong
- Kevin Chong
- Jillian Christmas
- John Robert Colombo
- Nick Comilla
- Wayde Compton
- Daniel Allen Cox
- Ivan Coyote
- Brad Cran
- François Cusset
- Amber Dawn
- Kelli Deeth
- Tamas Dobozy
- Kristyn Dunnion
- Larry Duplechan
- Francesca Ekwuyasi
- Tess Fragoulis
- D.M. Fraser
- Jon Furberg
- Daniel Gawthrop
- Andrew George, Jr.
- Hiromi Goto
- William Gibson
- Jonathan Goldberg
- Gabriella Goliger
- Betsy Greer
- Brett Josef Grubisic
- Celia Haig-Brown
- Matthew Hays
- Lucas Hildebrand
- Gord Hill
- David Homel
- Nalo Hopkinson
- Sean Horlor
- Brian Howell
- Robert Hunter
- George K. Ilsley
- Joey Keithley
- Carla Kelly
- Jonathan Kemp
- Kevin Killian
- Tamai Kobayashi
- Sarah Kramer
- Natasha Kyssa
- Richard Labonté
- Dany Laferrière
- Larissa Lai
- Betty Lambert
- Catherine Lang
- Hadrien Laroche
- Mark Leiren-Young
- Ashley Little
- Dorothy Livesay
- Michael Lowenthal
- Judy MacDonald
- Nicole Markotic
- Jul Maroh
- Ashok Mathur
- Suzette Mayr
- Barbara-jo McIntosh
- Brendan McLeod
- Bridget Moran
- Sachiko Murakami
- Téa Mutonji
- Hasan Namir
- Michael Nava
- Billeh Nickerson
- Fraser Nixon
- David Nandi Odhiambo
- Stephen Osborne
- Allan Peterkin
- Leah Lakshmi Piepzna-Samarasinha
- Casey Plett
- Leanne Prain
- John Preston
- Darlene Quaife
- Andy Quan
- Raziel Reid
- J. Jill Robinson
- Patrick Roscoe
- Michael Rowe
- Marina Roy
- Jane Rule
- Lani Russwurm
- Lawrence Schimel
- Sarah Schulman
- Zena Sharman
- Sandra Shields
- Vivek Shraya
- Jean Smith
- Rae Spoon
- jae steele
- John Elizabeth Stintzi
- Shawn Syms
- Kai Cheng Thom
- Louis-Georges Tin
- Aren X. Tulchinsky
- Michael Turner
- Sylvia Tyson
- Arielle Twist
- John Vigna
- Tom Walmsley
- David Watmough
- Thomas Waugh
- Barry Webster
- Joshua Whitehead
- Sheri-D Wilson
- Cathleen With
- David H.T. Wong
- Jim Wong-Chu
- Christine Wunnicke
- Greg Youmans
- A. Light Zachary
- Daniel Zomparelli

The company has also published art books by or on the work of Stan Douglas, Peter Flinsch, Attila Richard Lukacs, and Ralf König.

== See also ==
- Cleis Press
- Feminist Press
- Graywolf Press
- Greystone Books
- New Star Books
- Talonbooks
- Topside Press
