= Plenitude (magazine) =

Canadian literary magazine

- Editor: Patrick Grace
- Former editors: Andrea Routley
- Categories: Literary magazine
- Founded: 2012
- First issue: August 2012
- Company: Plenitude Publishing Society
- Country: Canada
- Based in: Victoria, British Columbia, Canada
- Language: English
- Website: plenitudemagazine.ca
- ISSN: 1929-8080
- OCLC: 1036081035

Plenitude is a Canadian literary magazine. Launched in 2012 by editor Andrea Routley as a platform for new work by LGBTQ writers, it originally published biannually in electronic format for distribution on e-readers and tablets; in early 2014, the magazine announced that it was also launching a conventional print run. As of 2015, however, the magazine no longer publishes paid issues in either format, but instead publishes all new content directly to its website.

Routley, a creative writing student at the University of Victoria, launched the magazine as a self-directed study project within her academic coursework. In addition to Routley, the magazine's editorial staff includes poetry editor Aysia Law and film and video curator Dorothy June Fraser, while advisory board members include John Barton, Maureen Bradley, L. Chris Fox, Sara Graefe and Arleen Paré.

According to Routley, the magazine's goal is to provide a venue for innovative and unapologetically queer writing:

Canada needs a venue where we don’t have to write our way past these queer narratives that have dominated mainstream representations. I don’t want to clarify the sexual history of every character because this theoretical ‘average reader’ is unfamiliar with queer histories and cultures, for example. If I did that, then every story would be like a new conversation with a stranger. If we’re always introducing ourselves, how can we really dig in?

Two pieces first published in the magazine, by Matthew R. Loney and Peter Knegt, were selected for inclusion in Lethe Press' anthology Best Gay Stories 2013.

== Issues and contributors ==
1. (Fall 2012): Betsy Warland, Peter Knegt, Kevin Shaw, Stacy Brewster, Lindsay Cahill, Nancy Jo Cullen, Geer Austin, Trevor Corkum, Emilia Nielsen, Theodosia Henney, Matthew R. Loney, Alex Leslie, Susan Holbrook, Leah Horlick, Kevin McLellan, Kyle Kushnir.
2. (Spring 2013): Lydia Kwa, Alex Leslie, Sierra Skye Gemma, George K. Ilsley, Sadie McCarney, Elizabeth Meade, Megan Backer, Rachel Lindley, Flower Conroy, John Champagne, Wendy Donawa, Ali Blythe, Jim Brega, Sigal Samuel.
3. (Fall 2013): Amber Dawn, John Barton, Brett Josef Grubisic, Daniel Zomparelli, Aaron Michael Kline, Helen Polychronakos, Rosie Garland, Adrienne Gruber, Michael Dunwoody, Sarah L. Johnson, Casey Plett, Svetlana Kitto, Sandra Weyant.
4. (Spring 2014): Rachel Rose, Shannon Webb-Campbell, Andy Quan, Shawn Syms, Caitlin Cranshaw, Lukas Bhandar, Mette Bach, Jane Byers, Bradley Jay, Jane Eaton Hamilton, Will Vallieres, Jon Riccio, Faye Guenther, Nat Marshik, Amal Rana, Sugar Le Fae, Jay Torrence.
5. (Fall 2014): Ashley Little, Alan Woo, Esther McPhee, Brett Josef Grubisic, Joan Dempsey, Laura Grothaus, Leah Horlick, Llew Forestell, M-E Girard, Ron Schafrick, Vincent Page.
