= Dayne Ogilvie Prize =

Canadian literary award

Dayne Ogilvie Prize for LGBTQ2S+ Emerging Writers
- Awarded for: Exceptional merit in work relating to LGBTQ literature in Canada
- Country: Canada
- Presented by: Writers' Trust of Canada
- First award: 2007
- Website: Dayne Ogilvie Prize

The Dayne Ogilvie Prize for LGBTQ2S+ Emerging Writers is a Canadian literary award, presented annually by the Writers' Trust of Canada to an emerging Canadian writer who is part of the lesbian, gay, bisexual, transgender, or queer community. Originally presented as a general career achievement award for emerging writers that considered their overall body of work, since 2022 it has been presented to honor debut books.

It is one of two literary awards in Canada serving the LGBTQ community, alongside the Blue Metropolis Violet Prize for established writers.

The award was originally established by artist Robin Pacific as the Dayne Ogilvie Grant in memory of Dayne Ogilvie, a book editor, writer, arts manager and former managing editor of Xtra! who died in October 2006. The award was renamed from a grant to a prize in 2012.

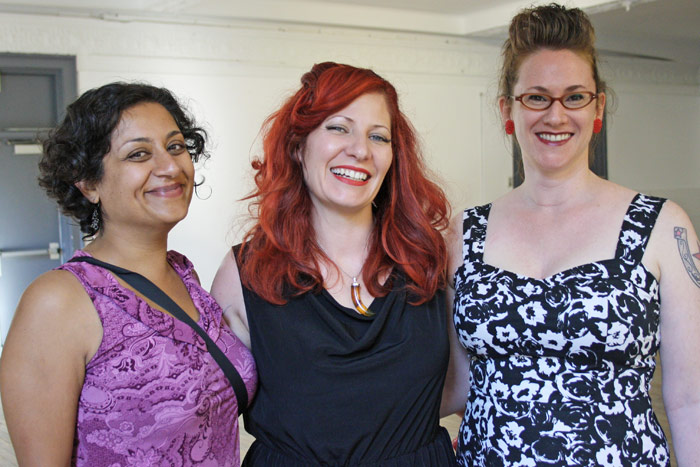
Dayne Ogilvie Prize winners Farzana Doctor, Amber Dawn, Debra Anderson

Established in 2007, the CA$5,000 prize was not originally presented for a specific work, although writers must have published at least one book of fiction or poetry to be eligible. The winner was selected by an independent jury of three members, and presented annually; the presentation was normally in June, although the 2020 announcement was postponed to October due to the COVID-19 pandemic in Canada. In its early years the award was presented in conjunction with Pride Toronto, although in later years it expanded to different venues and cities.

Beginning in the prize's second year, the award introduced a preliminary shortlist of two or three writers. In 2019, Casey Plett became the first nominee in the award's history to be renominated a second time.

In 2022, the Writers' Trust transitioned the award from a general "career achievement" award into a prize to honour specific debut books. The award's scheduling has also been moved so that it no longer takes place in June as part of Pride Month, but in November at the same gala presentation as the other Writers' Trust awards.

The prize package has since been increased to $12,000 for the winner, and $2,000 for each of the non-winning finalists.

== Recipients ==
=== General achievement (2007-2021) ===
Year	Jury	Author	Result	Ref.
2007		Michael V. Smith	Winner	
2008	Elizabeth Ruth; Maureen Hynes; Dan Bazuin	Zoe Whittall	Winner	
2008	Elizabeth Ruth; Maureen Hynes; Dan Bazuin	Brian Francis	Finalist	
2008	Elizabeth Ruth; Maureen Hynes; Dan Bazuin	John Miller	Finalist	
2009	Derek McCormack; Shani Mootoo; Aren X. Tulchinsky	Debra Anderson	Winner	
2009	Derek McCormack; Shani Mootoo; Aren X. Tulchinsky	Greg Kearney	Finalist	
2010	Brian Francis; Don Hannah; Suzette Mayr	Nancy Jo Cullen	Winner	
2010	Brian Francis; Don Hannah; Suzette Mayr	Lisa Foad	Finalist	
2010	Brian Francis; Don Hannah; Suzette Mayr	George K. Ilsley	Finalist	
2011	Jen Sookfong Lee; Jeffrey Round; Zoe Whittall	Farzana Doctor	Winner	
2011	Jen Sookfong Lee; Jeffrey Round; Zoe Whittall	Dani Couture	Finalist	
2011	Jen Sookfong Lee; Jeffrey Round; Zoe Whittall	Matthew J. Trafford	Finalist	
2012	Kamal Al-Solaylee; Ivan E. Coyote; Michael V. Smith	Amber Dawn	Winner	
2012	Kamal Al-Solaylee; Ivan E. Coyote; Michael V. Smith	Mariko Tamaki	Honorable mention	
2013	Amber Dawn; Anne Fleming; Vivek Shraya	C. E. Gatchalian	Winner	
2013	Amber Dawn; Anne Fleming; Vivek Shraya	Anand Mahadevan	Finalist	
2013	Amber Dawn; Anne Fleming; Vivek Shraya	Barry Webster	Finalist	
2014	Anna Camilleri; Connie Fife; Bill Whitehead	Tamai Kobayashi	Winner	
2014	Anna Camilleri; Connie Fife; Bill Whitehead	Rae Spoon	Finalist	
2014	Anna Camilleri; Connie Fife; Bill Whitehead	Proma Tagore	Finalist	
2015	Nancy Jo Cullen; Brett Josef Grubisic; Anand Mahadevan	Alex Leslie	Winner	
2015	Nancy Jo Cullen; Brett Josef Grubisic; Anand Mahadevan	Casey Plett	Finalist	
2015	Nancy Jo Cullen; Brett Josef Grubisic; Anand Mahadevan	Vivek Shraya	Finalist	
2016	Anjula Gogia; Billeh Nickerson; Casey Plett	Leah Horlick	Winner	
2016	Anjula Gogia; Billeh Nickerson; Casey Plett	Gwen Benaway	Finalist	
2016	Anjula Gogia; Billeh Nickerson; Casey Plett	Jia Qing Wilson-Yang	Finalist	
2017	Jane Eaton Hamilton; Elio Iannacci; Trish Salah	Kai Cheng Thom	Winner	
2017	Jane Eaton Hamilton; Elio Iannacci; Trish Salah	Ali Blythe	Finalist	
2017	Jane Eaton Hamilton; Elio Iannacci; Trish Salah	Eva Crocker	Finalist	
2018	Ali Blythe; Greg Kearney; Shannon Webb-Campbell	Ben Ladouceur	Winner	
2018	Ali Blythe; Greg Kearney; Shannon Webb-Campbell	Trish Salah	Finalist	
2018	Ali Blythe; Greg Kearney; Shannon Webb-Campbell	Joshua Whitehead	Finalist	
2019	Amber Dawn; Kai Cheng Thom	Jas M. Morgan	Winner	
2019	Amber Dawn; Kai Cheng Thom	Joelle Barron	Finalist	
2019	Amber Dawn; Kai Cheng Thom	Casey Plett	Finalist	
2020	Trevor Corkum; Jas M. Morgan; Leah Lakshmi Piepzna-Samarasinha	Arielle Twist	Winner	
2020	Trevor Corkum; Jas M. Morgan; Leah Lakshmi Piepzna-Samarasinha	Robyn Maynard	Finalist	
2020	Trevor Corkum; Jas M. Morgan; Leah Lakshmi Piepzna-Samarasinha	Smokii Sumac	Finalist	
2021	Daniel Allen Cox; Eva Crocker; Danny Ramadan	Jillian Christmas	Winner	
2021	Daniel Allen Cox; Eva Crocker; Danny Ramadan	Kama La Mackerel	Finalist	
2021	Daniel Allen Cox; Eva Crocker; Danny Ramadan	jaye simpson	Finalist	

=== Debut book prize (2022-present) ===
Year	Jury	Author	Book	Result	Ref.
2022	Billy-Ray Belcourt; Samra Habib; Zoey Leigh Peterson	Francesca Ekwuyasi	Butter Honey Pig Bread	Winner	
2022	Billy-Ray Belcourt; Samra Habib; Zoey Leigh Peterson	Zaiba Baig	Acha Bacha	Shortlist	
2022	Billy-Ray Belcourt; Samra Habib; Zoey Leigh Peterson	Matthew James Weigel	Whitemud Walking	Shortlist	
2023	S. Bear Bergman; Nicholas Dawson; Sharanpal Ruprai	Anuja Varghese	Chrysalis	Winner	
2023	S. Bear Bergman; Nicholas Dawson; Sharanpal Ruprai	Gabriel Cholette	Scenes from the Underground	Shortlist	
2023	S. Bear Bergman; Nicholas Dawson; Sharanpal Ruprai	Amanda Cordner and David Di Giovanni	Body So Fluorescent	Shortlist	
2024	Jillian Christmas; Adam Garnet Jones; Hazel Jane Plante	Anthony Oliveira	Dayspring	Winner	
2024	Jillian Christmas; Adam Garnet Jones; Hazel Jane Plante	Vincent Anioke	Perfect Little Angels	Shortlist	
2024	Jillian Christmas; Adam Garnet Jones; Hazel Jane Plante	Éric Chacour	What I Know About You	Shortlist	
2025	Gabrielle Boulianne-Tremblay; Darrin Hagen; Janika Oza	Roza Nozari	All the Parts We Exile	Winner	
2025	Gabrielle Boulianne-Tremblay; Darrin Hagen; Janika Oza	Tea Gerbeza	How I Bend Into More	Shortlist	
2025	Gabrielle Boulianne-Tremblay; Darrin Hagen; Janika Oza	Ziyad Saadi	Three Parties	Shortlist	
2026	francesca ekwuyasi Kama La Mackerel; Michael V. Smith	Misha Solomon	My Great-Grandfather Danced Ballet	Winner	
2026	francesca ekwuyasi Kama La Mackerel; Michael V. Smith	Gwen Aube	Missed Connections with Tall Girls	Shortlist	
2026	francesca ekwuyasi Kama La Mackerel; Michael V. Smith	Tiana Reid	Nightnursing	Shortlist	
