= Diem =

Diem may refer to:

== Latin phrases ==
- Carpe diem, a Latin phrase meaning "seize the day"
- Per diem, meaning "per day"
- De die in diem, a legal term meaning "from day to day"

== People ==
=== Given name ===
- Diem Brown (1980–2014), American television personality and journalist
- Ngo Dinh Diem (1901–1963), Vietnamese leader assassinated in a military coup
- Diem Saunders (1991/1992–2021), Inuk writer and activist from Canada

=== Surname ===
- Carl Diem (1882–1962), originator of the Olympic torch relay
- Ryan Diem (born 1979), American football player

== Other uses ==
- Diem (digital currency) (2019-2022), a digital currency formerly proposed by Facebook
- DiEM25, Democracy in Europe Movement 2025
- Diem or Didam, a town in the Netherlands
