= The Church-Wellesley Review =

Canadian magazine

- Editor: Jeffrey Round; David Wallberg
- Categories: Literary, LGBT
- Frequency: quarterly
- Founded: 1990
- First issue: April 27, 1990
- Company: Pink Triangle Press
- Country: Canada
- Based in: Toronto, Ontario
- Language: English
- ISSN: 1483-8281
- OCLC: 1082478972

The Church-Wellesley Review was a Canadian literary magazine.

Launched in 1990 as a quarterly supplement to Xtra!, the Review published literary work by LGBT writers. It was founded and originally overseen by Xtra! staff editor Jeffrey Round with assistance from freelance contributor Peter Hawkins. David Wallberg later became the editor.

The Review won an international design award from Publish in 1992.

Noted writers who were published in the Review early in their careers included Brian Francis, Dale Peck, Debra Anderson, George K. Ilsley, Jane Eaton Hamilton, Daniel David Moses, Billeh Nickerson, R. M. Vaughan and Marnie Woodrow; the Review also sometimes published work by established writers such as Timothy Findley, Jane Rule, David Watmough, Patrick Roscoe and Shyam Selvadurai.

Xtra! discontinued the Review in 2000. It was briefly continued as a separate online publication, but folded by 2002.
