= Anand Mahadevan =

Indian-Canadian writer (born 1979)

- Born: 1979 (age 46–47); Tamil Nadu, India
- Occupation: novelist
- Writing career
- Period: 2000s-present
- Notable work: The Strike

Anand Mahadevan is an Indian-Canadian writer, who was awarded an Honour of Distinction from the Dayne Ogilvie Prize for LGBT writers in 2013.

Born and raised in Tamil Nadu, India, Mahadevan moved to the United States at age 17 to study. He moved to Canada in 2002, and teaches science at the University of Toronto Schools and creative writing at the Humber School for Writers.

The Strike, his debut novel about a young Tamil man's gay sexual awakening, was published in Canada by TSAR Publications in 2006. Its publication in India followed in 2009.

His second novel, tentatively titled American Sufi, is slated for future publication.

He has also been an active supporter of the campaign to strike down Section 377 of the Indian Penal Code, which criminalized homosexuality in India.

He subsequently served on the jury for the 2015 Dayne Ogilvie Prize, selecting Alex Leslie as that year's winner.

== Works ==
- The Strike (2006)
