= Stanley G. Grizzle =

Canadian activist (1918–2016)

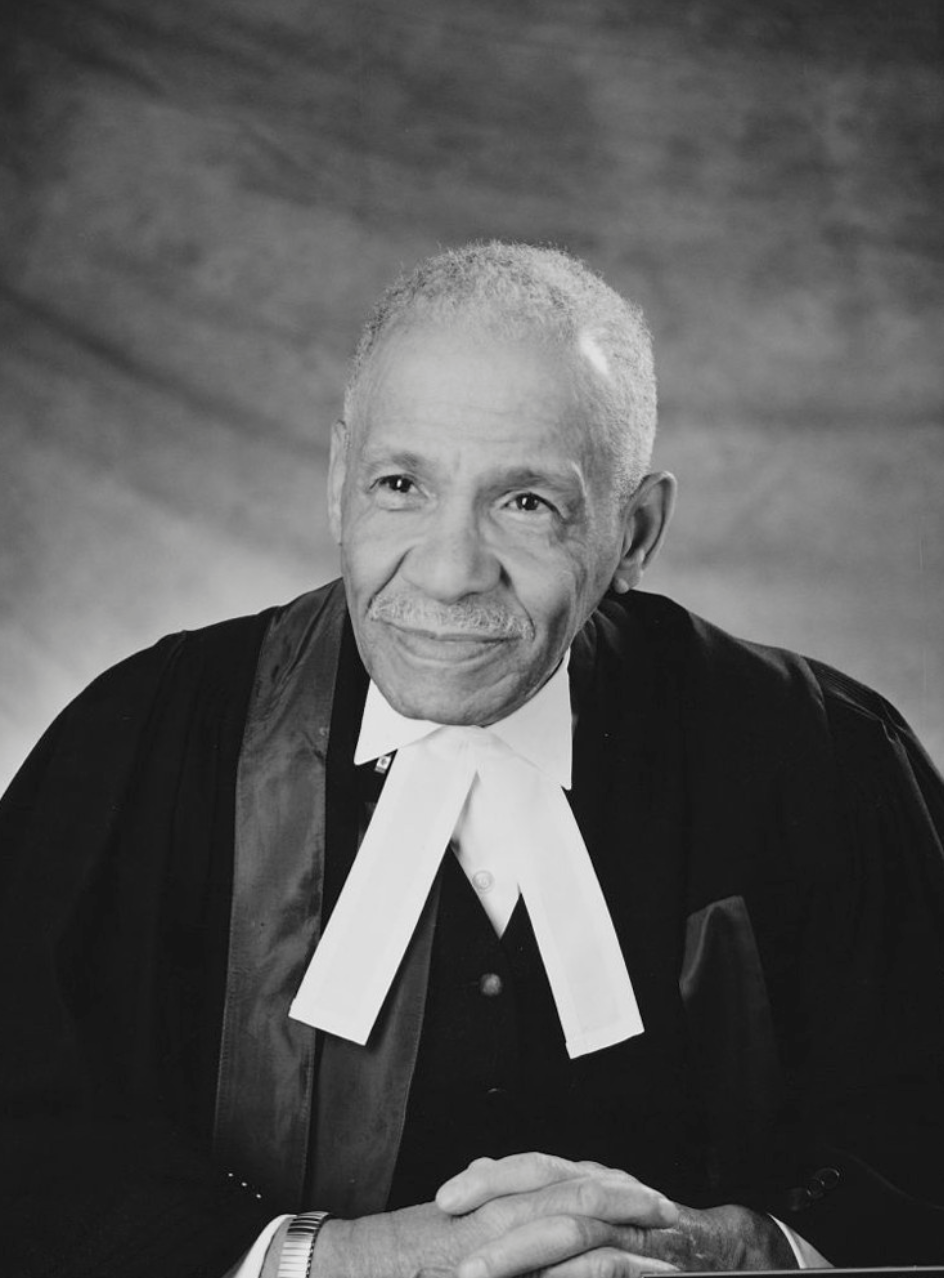
- Born: November 18, 1918; Toronto, Ontario, Canada
- Died: November 12, 2016 (aged 97); Toronto, Ontario, Canada

Stanley George Sinclair Grizzle (November 18, 1918 – November 12, 2016) was a Canadian citizenship judge, soldier, politician, and civil rights and labour union activist. He died in November 2016 at the age of 97.

== Early life ==
Stanley Grizzle was born to Theodore Grizzle and Mary Sinclair Grizzle in Toronto in November 1918. Grizzle had grown up in the area of Bathurst and College and was one of seven children in his family.

Prior to meeting, Grizzle's parents had both immigrated to Toronto from Jamaica in 1911 and later met in the city. Mary Grizzle had arrived to Toronto as a domestic worker, while Theodore Grizzle worked as a chef, before later establishing a successful taxi company prior to the Great Depression. Grizzle detailed his childhood in his book My Name's Not George (1998).

Stanley Grizzle was exposed to racism within the Toronto community at a young age. When Grizzle was 10 years old, his father came home with a bandaged face after being attacked while sleeping in his taxi cab.

== Porter experience ==
At 22 years old, Grizzle began working as a porter on the Canadian Pacific Railway in June 1940. During this time, working as a railway porter was one the main jobs available to Black men in Canadian cities. Grizzle explained that he got a job as a porter as he could not find any other employment.

Black porters such as Grizzle were expected to tend to the needs of travellers at all times. Their job included carrying and storing luggage, cleaning toilets, shining shoes, setting up and making beds, pressing clothing, serving food, and more. The work of a porter demanded long hours and was very underpaid. Job security was another worry, as porters could easily be let go. Additionally, Black porters in Canada often experienced racism within their roles. One of the most demeaning aspects of the job was that travellers often called Black porters "George", after George Pullman, the inventor of the Pullman sleeping car.

In Grizzle's book My Name's Not George: The Story of the Brotherhood of Sleeping Car Porters in Canada (1998), he wrote that many Black porters were "intelligent young Black men who [...] were denied [...] opportunities by a racist society, and instead had to go into a line of work that forced them into that demeaning role of servant".

== Union experience ==
While working as a porter, Grizzle became active in the Brotherhood of Sleeping Car Porters (BSCP), a trade union whose leader was the A. Philip Randolph.

Upon his return to Canada after serving in Europe during World War II, Grizzle became more active in the union. He was elected president of his union local, and pushed the Canadian Pacific Railway (CPR) to open the management ranks to Black people. He was also a leader in Canada's nascent civil rights movement of the 1950s, working with the Joint Labour Committee to Combat Racial Intolerance.

== Political career ==
In 1959, Grizzle and Jack White were the first Black Canadian candidates to run for election to the Legislative Assembly of Ontario for the Co-operative Commonwealth Federation (the predecessor to the New Democratic Party). In 1960, Grizzle went to work for the Ontario Labour Relations Board. In 1977 he was appointed a citizenship judge by Prime Minister Pierre Trudeau.

== Awards and recognition ==
In recognition of his work with the BSCP and his civil rights work, Grizzle received the Order of Ontario in 1990 from Lieutenant-Governor Lincoln Alexander. He received the Order of Canada in 1995 from Governor General Roméo LeBlanc.

On November 1, 2007, a park on Main Street in Toronto's East End was dedicated the Stanley G. Grizzle Park in a ceremony hosted by then-mayor David Miller.

Writer Suzette Mayr consulted Grizzle's book My Name's Not George: The Story of the Brotherhood of Sleeping Car Porters in Canada as part of her research for her Giller Prize-winning 2022 novel The Sleeping Car Porter.

== Family ==
Grizzle married Kathleen Victoria Toliver in 1942 they divorced in 1964. Toliver was a Canadian activist who was a founding member of the Canadian Negro Woman's Association and whose family was recognized as part of the Underground Railroad.

They had 6 biological children, Patricia, Nerene, Pamela, Stanley Jr., Latanya, and Sonya, as well as 14 grandchildren.

== Publications ==
- My Name's Not George: The Story of the Brotherhood of Sleeping Car Porters: Personal Reminiscences of Stanley G. Grizzle, with John Cooper.
