= Cecil Foster =

Canadian writer and scholar

- Born: September 26, 1954 (age 71); Bridgetown, Barbados
- Occupations: Author; Professor
- Known for: Scholarship on citizenship, multiculturalism, politics, race, ethnicity, and immigration

Cecil Foster (born September 26, 1954) is a Barbadian-Canadian novelist, essayist, journalist, and scholar. He is a professor in the Department of Transnational Studies at the University at Buffalo.

== Early life and education ==
Foster was born in Bridgetown, Barbados, on 26 September 1954 to Fred and Doris Goddard. When Foster was two years old, his parents migrated to Britain, leaving him with his grandparents. The family was extremely poor and rarely had enough to eat.

Foster attended Harrison College, a high school in Barbados. He immigrated to Canada in the late 1970s. Foster completed his PhD, a phenomenological exploration of the concept of Blackness in Canada, at York University in the early 2000s..

== Career ==
Foster began working for the Caribbean News Agency in Bridgetown as the senior reporter and editor (1975–77), and for the Barbados Advocate News as the reporter and columnist (1977–79). Foster emigrated to Canada in the late 1970s. He went on to work for the Toronto Star as a reporter (1979–82). Foster then began working for The Contrast as an editor (1979–82), Transportation Business Management as an editor (1982–83), The Globe and Mail as a reporter (1983–89), The Financial Post as a senior editor (1989), and Ontario's Minister of Culture as a special advisor through the mid-1990s.

His book Where Race Does Not Matter (2004) explores the potential of multiculturalism in Canada. It also expands on some of his earlier work that deals with issues of race in his own life as well as in the history of Canada. He is known for exploring race through immigration. Island Wings: A Memoir (1998) was written as an autobiography of his own life. His philosophical influences include Georg Hegel, Karl Marx, Alexandre Kojève, Will Kymlicka, Charles Taylor, and Pierre Trudeau.

Foster taught sociology at the University of Guelph in Ontario, Canada.

He is a well-regarded novelist. Foster served as a judge for the 2015 Scotiabank Giller Prize. He won the Writers' Trust of Canada's Gordon Montador Award Best Canadian Book on Contemporary Social Issues in 1997 for his book A Place Called Heaven. His novel Sleep On, Beloved (1995) was shortlisted for the Trillium Book Award and Blackness and Modernity: The Colour of Humanity and the Quest for Freedom (2007) won the 2008 John Porter Tradition of Excellence Book Award from the Canadian Sociological Association.

In 2019 he published the non-fiction book They Called Me George: The Untold Story of Black Train Porters and the Birth of Modern Canada, a history of Black Canadian railway porters. Writer Suzette Mayr consulted the book as part of her research for her Giller Prize-winning 2022 novel The Sleeping Car Porter.

== Books ==
- No Man in the House - 1991 ISBN 0-345-38899-2
- Distorted Mirror: Canada’s Racist Face - 1991 ISBN 978-0-006-37751-1
- Caribana: the Greatest Celebration - 1995 ISBN 978-0-345-39816-1
- Sleep On, Beloved - 1995 ISBN 978-0-345-39015-8
- A Place Called Heaven: The Meaning of Being Black in Canada - 1996 ISBN 978-0-00-639175-3
- Slammin' Tar - 1998 ISBN 978-0-679-30879-9
- Island Wings: A Memoir - 1998 ISBN 978-0-00-638497-7
- Dry Bones Memories - 2001 ISBN 978-1-55263-311-3
- Where Race Does Not Matter: The New Spirit of Modernity - 2004 ISBN 978-0-14-301769-1
- Blackness and Modernity: The Colour of Humanity and the Quest for Freedom - 2007 ISBN 978-0-7735-3247-2
- Genuine Multiculturalism: The Tragedy and Comedy of Diversity - 2013 ISBN 978-0-773-54256-3
- Independence - 2014 ISBN 978-1-4434-1505-7
- They Call Me George: The Untold Story of Black Train Porters and the Birth of Modern Canada. Toronto: CELA. 2019. ISBN 9781771962612

== See also ==
- Barbadian Canadians
