= The Sleeping Car Porter =

2022 novel by Suzette Mayr

- First edition cover
- Author: Suzette Mayr
- Cover artist: Janet Hill
- Language: English
- Genres: Literary fiction
- Publisher: Coach House Books
- Publication date: September 27, 2022
- Publication place: Canada
- Media type: Print (paperback)
- Pages: 224
- Awards: Giller Prize
- ISBN: 978-1-55245-458-9
- Dewey Decimal: C813/.54—dc23
- LC Class: PS8576.A9 S54 2022

The Sleeping Car Porter is a novel by Canadian writer Suzette Mayr, published in August 2022 by Coach House Books. Set in the 1920s, the novel centres on Baxter, a Black Canadian and closeted gay immigrant from the Caribbean who is working as a railway porter to save money to fund his dream of getting educated as a dentist.

The Sleeping Car Porter won the 2022 Giller Prize, and Publishers Weekly named it one of the top ten works of fiction published in 2022.

The book's cover art is Unapologetically William by Janet Hill.

== Background ==
Mayr credited poet Fred Wah with having given her the original suggestion to write about railway porters, and consulted books such as Cecil Foster's They Call Me George: The Untold Story of Black Train Porters and the Birth of Modern Canada, Stanley G. Grizzle's My Name's Not George: The Story of the Brotherhood of Sleeping Car Porters in Canada and Johnnie F. Kirvin's Hey Boy! Hey George: The Pullman Porter for insight into the job and its working conditions. She also likened the process of writing the novel to a sort of genealogy, telling Xtra! that "Part of being a queer person is trying to find your ancestors and it's not necessarily about people you are biologically related to but people in the queer community who came before you and knowing that you have a place and you're not the first and you're not the only one. It was me excavating a past to find people like me."

== Reception ==
In a review in the Toronto Star, author Brett Josef Grubisic called The Sleeping Car Porter "a lovely (as well as touching and ever-so-slightly fevered) account" of Baxter, a gay black porter on a long-distance train in Canada. Grubisic noted that while in general history has not paid much attention to the serving classes, Mayr has redressed this with "an absorbing history lesson within an artfully constructed story that moves, beguiles, and satisfies." He added that despite Baxter's hardships throughout the book, Mayr created an ending that is "rich with possibility, a suggestion that times were tough but not always and not for everybody."

Reviewing The Sleeping Car Porter in Alberta Views, H. Nigel Thomas described the book as "a brilliantly multilayered novel, written for the most part in pictorial language and rich in its observations of the human condition." He said Mayr is at her best when she shows how Baxter copes with having to stay awake for days on end. Falling asleep will get him fired, which he cannot afford as employment opportunities for blacks in other fields is effectively non-existent. Thomas remarked that the novel illustrates "the cruelty of unregulated capitalism, further abetted by racism, during the first half of the 20th century."

Writing in the Literary Review of Canada, Marlo Alexandra Burks said that while Mayr's narration is "lively and pliant", she questioned some of the book's plot devices. She felt it is never fully explained why Baxter, "a young, queer, Black man 'born in the tropics' and known for his penchant for 'scientifiction' and his talent for seeing what he shouldn't", wants to be a dentist. Becoming a writer makes more sense, considering Baxter's interest in reading, and his flair for making up stories. Burks remarked that The Sleeping Car Porter reminds her of Gerhart Hauptmann's 1888 novella, Lineman Thiel in which a railway worker also "struggles with fatigue, temporal confusion, and disturbing visions". But unlike that novella's tragic conclusion, Mayr's story ends "by envisioning a society that dares to acknowledge its ghosts."

== Awards ==
The Sleeping Car Porter was the winner of the 2022 Giller Prize. It was the first LGBTQ-themed novel, and Mayr the first LGBTQ-identified writer, ever to win the Giller.

In 2023, it was shortlisted for the inaugural Carol Shields Prize for Fiction, and the Governor General's Award for English-language fiction at the 2023 Governor General's Awards.
