= Proma Tagore =

Canadian poet and editor

- Born: Kolkata, India
- Occupations: poet, editor
- Writing career
- Period: 2000s–present
- Notable work: language is not the only thing that breaks

Proma Tagore is a Canadian poet, editor, and literary critic whose work explores themes of migration, identity, decolonization, and social justice. In 2014, she received an Honour of Distinction from the Dayne Ogilvie Prize for LGBTQ writers, recognizing her contributions to queer and anti-racist literature.

Born in Kolkata, India, Tagore emigrated to Canada with her family at the age of four. She resides in Victoria and Vancouver, British Columbia.

She has published a poetry collection, language is not the only thing that breaks, and a non-fiction work of literary analysis, The Shapes of Silence: Writing by Women of Colour and the Politics of Testimony. She was also editor of In Our Own Voices: Learning and Teaching Toward Decolonisation, an anthology of essays by students and educators on the subject of racial discrimination and decolonization.

== Works ==
- In Our Own Voices: Learning and Teaching Toward Decolonisation (Larkuma Press, 2006. ISBN 0-9733821-2-0)
- The Shapes of Silence: Writing by Women of Colour and the Politics of Testimony (McGill-Queen's University Press, 2009. ISBN 9780773534551)
- language is not the only thing that breaks (Arsenal Pulp Press, 2011. ISBN 9781551523996)
