= Andrea Routley =

Canadian writer

- Occupations: short story writer, magazine editor
- Writing career
- Language: English
- Years active: 2010s–present

Andrea Routley is a Canadian writer based in Vancouver, British Columbia. Her short story collection Jane and the Whales was a finalist for the Lambda Literary Award for Debut Fiction at the 26th Lambda Literary Awards in 2014. Her short stories appear in Canadian literary magazines such as Geist and The Fiddlehead Review.

She was a founder of the LGBT literary magazine Plenitude and of the Sunshine Coast's (Canada) Read Out Loud LGBT reading series, and was editor of the 2010 anthology Walk Myself Home: An Anthology to End Violence Against Women. In 2020, her book This Unlikely Soil was shortlisted for the Malahat Review Novella Prize.

During the 2022–2023 winter, Routley was a writer-in-residence at the Haig-Brown House of the Campbell River Museum on Vancouver Island, where she planned to finish a new novel.
