= Michael V. Smith =

Canadian novelist, poet and filmmaker

- Born: Cornwall, Ontario, Canada
- Occupation: Writer
- Writing career
- Period: 2000s–present
- Notable works: Cumberland, Progress
- Notable awards: 2007 Dayne Ogilvie Prize
- Website: www.michaelvsmith.com

Michael V. Smith is a Canadian novelist, poet and filmmaker, originally from Cornwall, Ontario and now living in Kelowna, British Columbia. His debut novel, Cumberland, was nominated for the Books in Canada First Novel Award in 2002. He has also been a nominee for the Journey Prize and the inaugural winner of the Dayne Ogilvie Prize, and has published two books of poetry, What You Can't Have and Body of Text, and a memoir, My Body Is Yours.

Smith, openly gay, is a graduate of the University of British Columbia's Creative Writing program. He has also made a number of short films, several of which have garnered awards from the Inside Out Film and Video Festival in Toronto, Ontario. He teaches at the University of British Columbia Okanagan Campus in the interdisciplinary Faculty of Creative and Critical Studies.

He served on the jury of the 2012 Dayne Ogilvie Prize, selecting Amber Dawn as that year's winner.

Smith also formerly performed as a drag queen, under the stage name Miss Cookie LaWhore.

== Bibliography ==
=== Novels ===
- Cumberland (2002, ISBN 1-896951-36-8)
- Progress (2011, ISBN 1770860002)

=== Poetry ===
- What You Can't Have (2007, ISBN 978-1-897109-09-0)
- Body of Text (2008, ISBN 978-1-897388-28-0)
- Bad Ideas (2017, ISBN 978-0-889713-26-0)

=== Memoir ===
- My Body Is Yours (2015 ISBN 9781551525785)
