= Francesca Ekwuyasi =

Canadian writer and artist

- Born: Lagos, Lagos State, Nigeria
- Education: Queen's College, Lagos (WASSCE); University of King's College (MFA)
- Occupation: Novelist
- Writing career
- Years active: 2020–present
- Genre: Literary fiction
- Notable work: Butter Honey Pig Bread
- Notable awards: Dayne Ogilvie Prize; 2022
- Website: ekwuyasi.com

Francesca Ekwuyasi is a Nigerian Canadian writer and director. She is most noted for her debut novel Butter Honey Pig Bread, which was published in 2020.

Ekwuyasi is also a mentor in the Master of Fine Arts in Fiction program at the University of King's College in Halifax, Nova Scotia. Her works explores themes of faith, family, queerness, consumption, loneliness, and belonging.

== Personal life ==
Originally from Lagos, Nigeria, Ekwuyasi is based in Halifax, Nova Scotia. She is queer.

== Career ==
Butter Honey Pig Bread was selected for the 2021 edition of Canada Reads, where it was defended by Roger Mooking. The book was longlisted for the 2020 Giller Prize. It was also shortlisted for the 2021 Lambda Literary Award for Lesbian Fiction, the 2021 ReLit Award for Novel, the 2021 Amazon Canada First Novel Award, and the 2020 Governor General's Award for English-language fiction. In 2022, it won the Dayne Ogilvie Prize.

In 2023, she collaborated with Roger Mooking on the non-fiction book Curious Sounds: A Dialogue in Three Movements.

In addition to her writing, she had an exhibition of papercut art at Halifax's The Khyber in 2019 and has directed short documentary films including Reconcile and Black & Belonging.

== Awards and honours ==
- 2022 – Ekwuyasi won the Dayne Ogilvie Prize.
- 2020 – Butter Honey Pig Bread was shortlisted for the Governor General's Award for English-language fiction.
- 2021 – Butter Honey Pig Bread was shortlisted for the Amazon Canada First Novel Award, the Lambda Literary Award for Lesbian Fiction, and the ReLit Award for Novel.
- 2020 – Butter Honey Pig Bread was longlisted for the Giller Prize.
- 2021 – Butter Honey Pig Bread was selected for Canada Reads and defended by Roger Mooking.

== Works ==
=== Books ===
- Butter Honey Pig Bread (novel). Arsenal Pulp Press, 2020. ISBN 9781551528236.
- Curious Sounds: A Dialogue in Three Movements (non-fiction, with Roger Mooking). Arsenal Pulp Press, 2023. ISBN 978-1-55152-929-5.

=== Short documentaries ===
- Reconcile (director).
- Black & Belonging (director).
