= Derek McCormack (writer) =

Canadian novelist and short story writer (born 1969)

Derek McCormack (born June 20, 1969) is a Canadian novelist and short story writer whose work is characterized by its extreme brevity and its humorous, often distinctly queer forms of sexual darkness. Born and raised in Peterborough, Ontario.

McCormack's first book, 1996's Dark Rides, was published by Gutter Press, a small Canadian press founded by Sam Hiyate as part of a mid-1990s boomlet in alternative publishing in Toronto. That first book was edited by Ken Sparling, who left his aggressively minimalist imprint on it and McCormack's emerging style. The author/editor relationship was reversed in 2005, when McCormack edited Sparling's For Those Whom God Has Blessed With Fingers.

The subject of positive reviews and other media coverage, McCormack was frequently described at the beginning of his career as being part of a new generation of Canadian writers, most notably in a 1996 feature about him, Evan Solomon, Russell Smith and Andrew Pyper in The Globe and Mail.

But unlike Solomon, Smith and Pyper, McCormack never evinced any particular desire for commercial success, and his books stayed short and dark, and were published by a succession of small presses. Though they continued to get positive attention, including a nomination of Wild Mouse for the 1999 City of Toronto Book Award, and the inclusion of The Haunted Hillbilly on The Globe and Mail and Village Voice lists of the best books of the year for 2004, McCormack is now firmly a niche or cult writer rather than part of mainstream Canadian literary culture.

In 2009, he served on the jury for the Dayne Ogilvie Prize, a literary award for emerging LGBT writers in Canada, selecting Debra Anderson as that year's prize winner.

In the fall of 2011, McCormack was diagnosed with a cancer in his digestive system, for which he underwent extensive surgery in March 2012. Numerous figures in Toronto's arts scene, including musicians Jason Collett, Matthew Barber and Joe Pernice, writers Sheila Heti and Claudia Dey and artists Seth, David Altmejd and Shary Boyle, participated in a series of charity events to fund-raise for his medical and living expenses during his surgery and recuperation.

In the December issue of Artforum magazine, a Pas de Chance limited edition of his book The Well-Dressed Wound was featured in the "best of 2014."

== Works ==
- Dark Rides (1996)
- Wild Mouse (with Chris Chambers, 1998)
- Halloween Suite (1998)
- Wish Book (1999)
- Western Suit (2001)
- The Haunted Hillbilly (2003)
- Grab Bag (2004)
- Christmas Days (2005)
- The Show That Smells (2008)
- Line 3 (2014)
- The Well-Dressed Wound (2015)
- Castle Faggot (2020)
