= Fruit (novel) =

2004 novel

- First edition cover
- Author: Brian Francis
- Publisher: MacAdam/Cage
- Publication date: August 20, 2004
- ISBN: 1-931561-76-1

Fruit: A Novel About a Boy and His Nipples is a 2004 novel by Canadian writer Brian Francis. A 2005 edition was published in the U.S. under the title The Secret Fruit of Peter Paddington. In 2009, it was a runner-up for Canada Reads.

== Summary ==
Peter Paddington is a 13-year-old boy living in Sarnia, Ontario. Ever since gaining a substantial amount of weight Peter has struggled to make friends and has begun to be bullied.

After his most recent weight gain Peter realizes his nipples looks like cherries and begins to imagine they talk to him, chastising him for his weight and his fantasies about an older male neighbour. As Peter struggles to achieve normalcy in the eyes of his peers his begins to bind his nipples in order to make sure they do not reveal his secrets.

== Reception ==
Kirkus Reviews referred to Fruit as "a lovely and odd take on a time many of us would just as soon forget." According to Publishers Weekly, the novel has various "fantastical twists" and "hews closely to familiar coming-of-age formulas"; however, they found the "hapless narrator" to be "a winning hero." Quill & Quire's Ken Hunt described the narrator as "a sweet kid" who "has such a surplus of free-floating affection that it’s hard not to be drawn to him", though they found that "his stories become tedious".

In 2009 Fruit was featured on Canada Reads where the book was championed by Jen Sookfong Lee and was runner-up to the eventual winner.
