= Jen Sookfong Lee =

Chinese Canadian broadcaster and novelist

Jennifer Sookfong Lee
- Born: July 22, 1976 (age 50)
- Occupation: Novelist
- Children: 1
- Writing career
- Language: English
- Years active: 2007–present
- Website: sookfong.com

Jen Sookfong Lee on Bookbits radio.

Jen Sookfong Lee (born July 22, 1976) is a Chinese Canadian broadcaster and novelist. A radio personality for CBC Radio One in Vancouver, British Columbia, she contributes a regular literary segment called "Westcoast Words" to local programs On the Coast and All Points West and is a regular contributor to the national program The Next Chapter. In the CBC's national Canada Reads competition in 2009, she defended Brian Francis's novel Fruit.

Her published works include the adult novels The End of East (2007) and The Better Mother (2011), the young adult novel Shelter (2011), the non-fiction book Gentlemen of the Shade (2017), and the short story "Chill, Hush" in the anthology TOK: Writing the New City (2009). She also co-edited the anthology Whatever Gets You Through: Twelve Women on Life After Sexual Assault with Stacey May Fowles. Her novel The Conjoined was published in 2016 and was nominated for the Ethel Wilson Fiction Prize and the Dublin Literary Award. Her 2025 novel The Hunger We Pass Down was shortlisted for the Jim Deva Prize for Writing that Provokes in 2026.

She served on the jury for the 2011 Dayne Ogilvie Prize for emerging Canadian LGBT writers, selecting Farzana Doctor as that year's winner.

Since July 2021, she has been a commissioning editor for ECW Press.

Born and raised in East Vancouver, she and her son now live in North Burnaby.

== Bibliography ==
- The End of East (Knopf Canada, 2007)
- The Better Mother (Knopf Canada, 2011)
- The Conjoined (ECW Press, 2016)
- Finding Home: The Journey of Immigrants and Refugees (Orca Book Publishers, 2021)
- The Shadow List (Wolsak and Wynn, 2021)
- Superfan: How Pop Culture Broke My Heart (McClelland & Stewart, 2023)
- The Hunger We Pass Down (McClelland & Stewart, 2025)
