= Butter Honey Pig Bread =

2020 novel by Francesca Ekwuyasi

- Author: Francesca Ekwuyasi
- Language: English
- Genre: Literary fiction
- Publisher: Arsenal Pulp Press
- Publication date: September 3, 2020
- Publication place: Canada
- Media type: Print, ebook, kindle, audio
- ISBN: 9781551528236; 1st ed Paperback
- OCLC: 1140380383

Butter Honey Pig Bread is Francesca Ekwuyasi's debut novel, published on September 3, 2020 by Arsenal Pulp Press.

The book tells the story of three women, Kambirinachi and her twin daughters, Kehinde and Taiye, and takes place over three continents. Its main themes include food, family, and forgiveness.

== Background ==
In 2013, after completing her mandatory National Youth Service Corps stint in Nigeria and awaiting her Canadian visa, Ekwuyasi began writing and spent her days reading Nigerian literature in a local library. This experience shaped the writing of Butter Honey Pig Bread.

Later, Ekwuyasi received her Canadian visa and moved to Halifax and continued writing Butter Honey Pig Bread, though she didn't intend for it to be published. However, a friend encouraged her to send a draft to Arsenal Pulp Press, and around the time her Canadian work permit ended, the manuscript was accepted.

In time, the book was published, and Ekwuyasi received permanent residence in Canada.

== Reception ==
Butter Honey Pig Bread received starred reviews from Booklist and Publishers Weekly, as well as numerous positive reviews.

Laura Chanoux, writing for Booklist, applauded Ekwuyasi's writing, saying, "The descriptions throughout the novel... invite readers to fully savor Ekwuyasi’s language. Her writing is at times playful... Mixing emotional depth with supernatural elements, this is a masterful debut."

Further positive reviews came from The New Yorker, The Puritan, Hamilton Review of Books, The Suburban, This Black Girl Reads, Consumed by Ink, and Foreword Reviews.

CBC named Honey Butter Pig Bread one of the best Canadian novels of 2020. The Globe and Mail and Quill & Quire included it in their list of the best books of the year, regardless of genre.

Butter Honey Pig Bread was the ninth best selling Canadian book in 2021.

Awards and honors for Butter Honey Pig Bread
Year	Award/Honor	Category	Result	Ref.
2020	Giller Prize	—	Longlisted	
2020	Governor General's Award	Fiction in English	Shortlisted	
2021	Amazon.ca First Novel Award	—	Finalist	
2021	CBC Canada Reads	—	Nominated	
2021	Lambda Literary Award	Lesbian Fiction	Finalist	
2021	ReLit Award	Novel	Shortlisted	
2022	Dayne Ogilvie Prize	—	Won	
