= Jas M. Morgan =

Indigenous Canadian writer

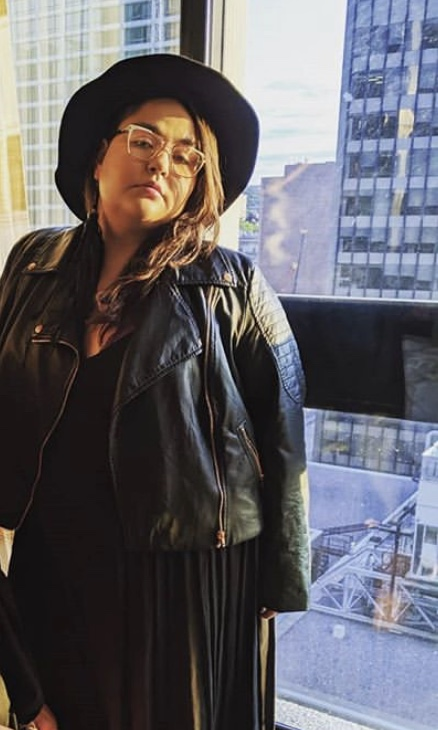
- Morgan before 2S Ball 2019 - Ottawa
- Education: McGill University
- Occupations: Writer, professor
- Writing career
- Language: English
- Website: jasmorgan.com

Jas M. Morgan is a Cree, Saulteaux and Métis writer who won the Dayne Ogilvie Prize for emerging LGBTQ writers in 2019.

== Biography ==
Morgan, of Cree, Saulteaux and Métis heritage, is a professor in the Department of English at Ryerson University. They are also a doctoral student in art history at McGill University, and Editor-at-Large on Indigenous art for Canadian Art magazine.

Their first book, nîtisânak, was published in 2018, and was nominated for the Lambda Literary Award for Lesbian Memoir or Biography at the 31st Lambda Literary Awards, and for the Indigenous Voices Award for English-language literature. They were identified as a Canadian writer to watch by CBC Books in 2019.

They previously worked as editor for mâmawi-âcimowak, an Indigenous art journal. Their writing has also appeared in GUTS, Malahat Review, Teen Vogue, Room, and other popular publications. In 2019 they served as one of the CBC Nonfiction Prize readers. Additionally, Morgan curated the 2019 Arts and Literary Magazines Summit.

== Awards ==
Yr	Work	Award	Category	Result	Ref
2018	Canadian Art Kinship issue	National Magazine Awards	Best Editorial Package	Nominated	
2019	nîtisânak	Dayne Ogilive Prize	—	Won	
2019	nîtisânak	Indigenous Voices Award	Published Prose in English	Shortlisted	
2019	nîtisânak	Lambda Literary Awards	Lesbian Memoir/Biography	Shortlisted	
2019	nîtisânak	Quebec Writers' Federation Awards	Concordia University First Book Prize	Nominated	
2019	"Sex Ed: Beyond the Classroom"	National Media Awards Foundation Digital Publishing Awards	Best Digital Editorial Package	Won	

== Bibliography ==
- —— (2016). Critical Sass. bawajigaywin.
- —— (2018). nîtisânak. Metonymy Press. ISBN 9780994047175.

Academic Publishing

- —— (2018). Prairie Families: Cree-Métis-Saulteux Materialities as Indigenous feminist Materialist Record of Kinship-Based Selfhood (Master of Arts Thesis).
- —— (2018). "I Wonder Where They Went: Post-Reality Multiplicities and Counter-Resurgent Narratives in Thirza Cuthand's Lessons in Baby Dyke Theory". Canadian Theatre Review (175): 47–51.
- —— (2019). "Toward a Relational Historicization of Indigenous Art". Art Journal. 77 (4): 127–128.
- —— (July 2019). "Distorted Love: Mapplethorpe, the Neo/Classical Sculptural Black Nude, and Visual Cultures of Transatlantic Enslavement". Imaginations.
