= Nancy Jo Cullen =

Canadian poet and short story writer

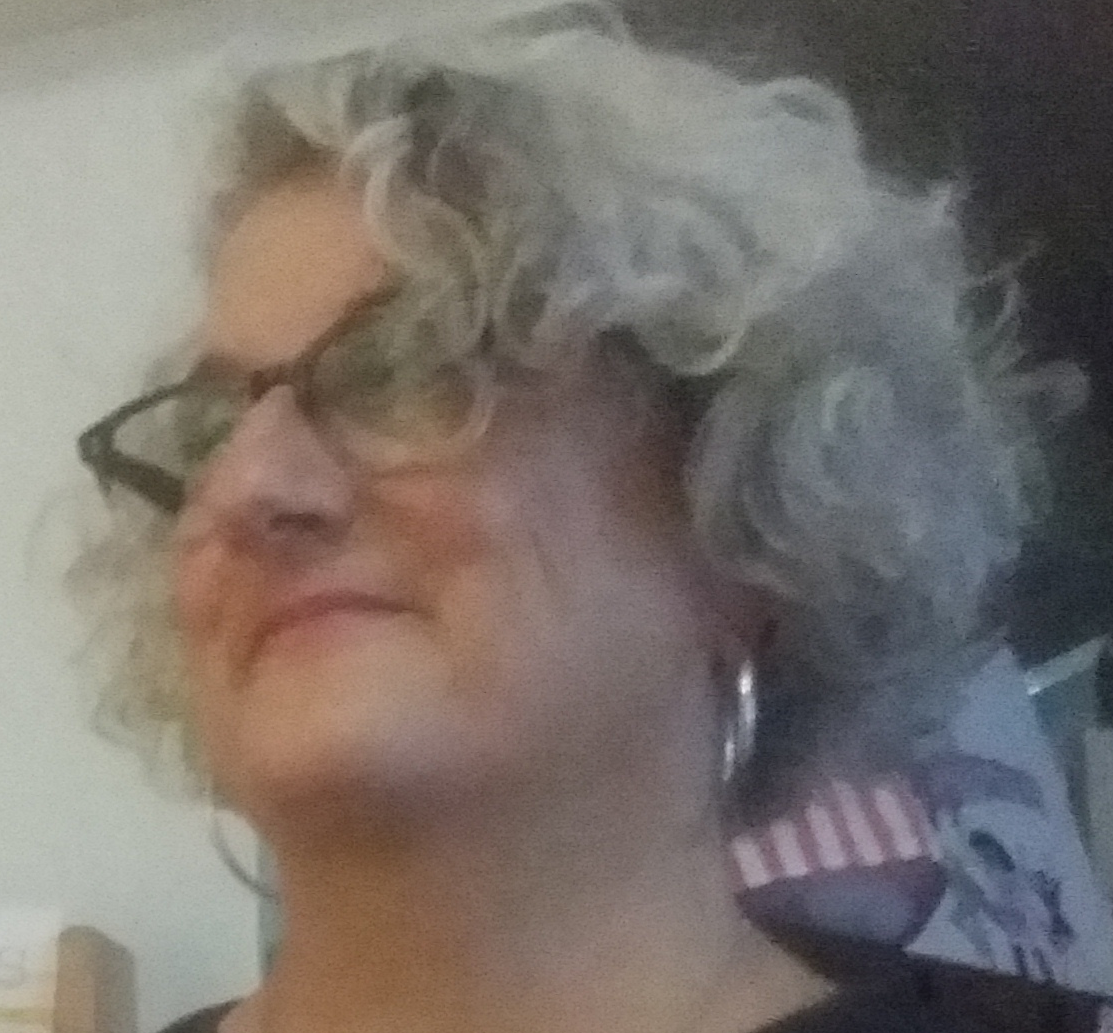
- Occupations: Poet; short story writer; novelist
- Writing career
- Period: 2000s–present
- Notable works: Science Fiction Saint; Pearl; Untitled Child; Canary
- Notable awards: Dayne Ogilvie Prize (2010)
- Website: nancyjocullen.net

Nancy Jo Cullen is a Canadian poet and fiction writer, who won the 2010 Dayne Ogilvie Prize for LGBTQ Emerging Writers from the Writers' Trust of Canada. The jury, consisting of writers Brian Francis, Don Hannah and Suzette Mayr, described Cullen in the award citation as a writer "who feels like a friend," and "tackles dark corners without false dramatics or pretensions. There is a genuine realness in her language."

Originally from British Columbia and a longtime resident of Calgary, Alberta, she now lives in Kingston, Ontario.

As of the time of her Dayne Ogilvie Prize win, she had published three volumes of poetry. Her short story "Ashes" was a finalist for the Journey Prize in 2012, and she has since published a full volume of short stories and a novel.

She served on the jury for the 2015 Dayne Ogilvie Prize, selecting Alex Leslie as that year's winner.

In 2020, her novel The Western Alienation Merit Badge was a finalist for the Amazon.ca First Novel Award, and in 2021 it was shortlisted for the 2020 ReLit Award for Novel.

== Works ==
- Science Fiction Saint (2002, poetry)
- Pearl (2006, poetry)
- Untitled Child (2009, poetry)
- Canary (2013, short stories)
- The Western Alienation Merit Badge (2019, novel)
- Nothing Will Save Your Life (2022, poetry)
