= Fraser Nixon =

Canadian writer

- Occupation: novelist
- Writing career
- Period: 2010s–present
- Notable work: The Man Who Killed
- Website: Official website

Fraser Nixon is a Canadian writer. His debut novel The Man Who Killed, published in 2011, was a shortlisted finalist for both the Amazon.ca First Novel Award and the Arthur Ellis Award for Best First Novel.

His second novel, Straight to the Head, is slated for publication by Arsenal Pulp Press in 2016.

He lives in Vancouver, British Columbia.
