= Joelle Barron =

Canadian poet and activist

Joelle Barron is a Canadian poet and activist, whose debut poetry collection Ritual Lights was published in 2018. The book was a longlisted nominee for the Gerald Lampert Award in 2019, and Barron was a shortlisted finalist for the Writers' Trust of Canada's 2019 Dayne Ogilvie Prize for emerging LGBTQ writers.

Barron, who uses gender-neutral pronouns, lives in Kenora, Ontario, where they are active as an organizer of the local LGBTQ youth group and the Kenora Pride festival.
