= George K. Ilsley =

Canadian writer (born 1958)

George K. Ilsley (born 1958) is a Canadian writer. He has published a collection of short stories, Random Acts of Hatred, which focuses on the lives of gay and bisexual men from childhood to early adulthood, and a novel, ManBug. His new memoir is The Home Stretch: A Father, a Son, and All the Things They Never Talk About (2020, Arsenal Pulp Press).

Originally from the Annapolis Valley in Nova Scotia, he has since been based in Vancouver, British Columbia. Prior to launching his career as a writer, he studied law, but decided not to become a lawyer. His writing has also appeared in the anthologies Queeries, Contra/Diction and First Person Queer, and in the literary magazines The Church-Wellesley Review, Event, Prairie Fire and Plenitude.

ManBug was a shortlisted finalist for the ReLit Award for Fiction in 2007. Ilsley was awarded an Honour of Distinction citation by the Writers' Trust of Canada's Dayne Ogilvie Grant in 2010, and his 2014 piece "Bingo and Black Ice" won subTerrain magazine's Lush Triumphant Award for creative non-fiction in 2014.
