= Roza Nozari =

Canadian artist and writer

Roza Nozari is a Canadian artist and writer based in Toronto, Ontario, whose debut book All the Parts We Exile was published in 2025.

The book, a memoir of her experiences growing up as a queer woman of Iranian descent, was shortlisted for the 2025 Toronto Book Awards, and won the 2025 Dayne Ogilvie Prize for LGBTQ2S+ emerging writers.
