= Nicole Markotic =

Canadian poet and novelist (born 1962)

- Born: 1962 (age 63–64)
- Education: University of Manitoba (MA); University of Calgary (PhD)
- Occupations: Novelist, poet

Nicole Markotić is a Canadian poet and novelist who lives in Windsor, Ontario. She teaches creative writing at the University of Windsor. Markotic specializes in the subjects of Canadian literature, poetry, children's literature, disability in film and disability in literature. Previously, she was an assistant professor at the University of Calgary. She was the co-editor, along with Ashok Mathur, of Calgary-based DisOrientation Chapbooks. She was also the poetry editor of Red Deer College Press from 1998 to 2004.

She co-edited The Problem Body: Projecting Disability on Film a critical book about disability in film, which was published by Ohio State Press in 2010. She also edited Robert Kroetsch: Essays on His Works, which was released in 2017.

== Bibliography ==
- connect the dots – 1994
- Yellow Pages: a catalogue of intentions – 1995
- more excess – 1997
- minotaurs & other alphabets – 1998
- Widows and Orphans – 2004
- Scrapbook of My Years as a Zealot – 2008
- Bent at the Spine – 2012
- "Rough Patch" – 2017
- After Beowulf - 2022 ISBN 9781770567153

== Awards ==
- bpNichol Chapbook Award (minotaurs & other alphabets, 1998)
