= Gabriel Cholette =

Canadian writer

- In a 2023 interview
- Education: Université de Montréal
- Occupation: Writer

Gabriel Cholette is a Canadian writer from Montreal, Quebec, whose debut book Carnets de l'underground was published in 2021.

The son of poet Mario Cholette, he is a Ph.D. graduate in French literature from the Université de Montréal. Carnets de l'underground began as an Instagram account detailing his posts about life in the underground LGBTQ club scene in Montreal, New York City and Berlin, before being collected in book form. The book also featured erotic illustrations by artist Jacob Pyne.

Scenes from the Underground, an English translation by Elina Tallion, was published in 2022, and was a finalist for the 2023 Dayne Ogilvie Prize for LGBT literature.
