= Hadrien Laroche =

French writer (born 1963)

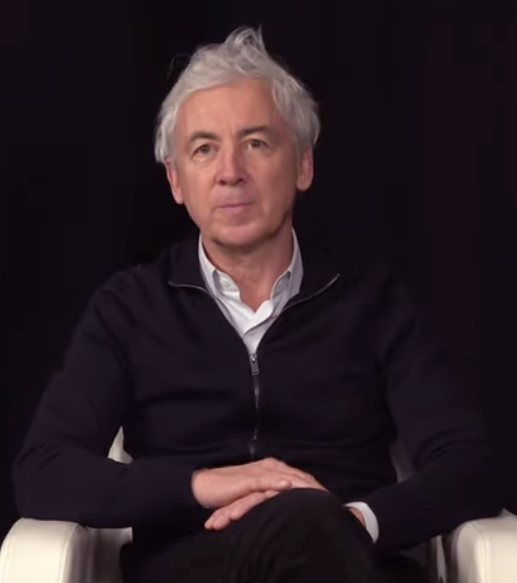
- In a 2026 interview
- Born: 13 November 1963 (age 62); Paris, France
- Education: Ecole normale supérieure; Ecole des Hautes Etudes en Sciences Sociales
- Occupation: Writer

Hadrien Laroche (French: [adʁjɛ̃ laʁɔʃ]; born 13 November 1963) is a French writer.

== Biography ==
Born in Paris in 1963, Hadrien Laroche is a former student of the Ecole normale supérieure. He was visiting professor at Dartmouth College (1985–1986) and a fellow of the School of Criticism and Theory. There he met Jacques Derrida and Patricia Williams. He completed his doctorate in philosophy under Derrida in 1996 at the Ecole des Hautes Etudes en Sciences Sociales (EHESS); Derrida considered Laroche his last doctoral student, and as "one of the most talented and original thinkers of his generation." He has worked for the past two decades as part of the French Foreign Ministry, and is currently cultural attaché of the French consulate in Toronto.

== Works ==
He has published essays on Jean Genet, Paul Cézanne, Marcel Duchamp ("La machine à signatures", Inculte #18, 2009), and three French-language novels—Les Orphelins (Paris: Allia/J'ai Lu, 2005), Les Heretiques (Paris: Flammarion, 2006), and La Restitution (Paris: Flammarion, 2009)—which have placed him at the forefront of contemporary French writing.

For the centenary of Jean Genet's birth, Arsenal Pulp Press has published a translation of his essay The Last Genet, a writer in revolt, translated by David Homel. The book was presented at Nottingham Contemporary (UK). The book has been widely acclaimed by Bernard Henry Levy.

He has been a correspondent for Les Inrockuptibles. He has done interviews with Bret Easton Ellis, Hubert Selby Jr., and other French and American writers.

For the Maison des écrivains et des traducteurs étranger meetings, he has been the editor of the magazine for the meeting Le Caire/Vancouver (2008) and the meet no. 16 Quito/Dublin (2012). He has participated in meeting no.6 and was the director of the centenary conference Pour Genet, at the Abbaye de Fontevraud in 2010.

=== English ===
- The Last Genet: a writer in revolt, trans. by David Homel (Arsenal Pulp Press, 2010). ISBN 978-1-55152-365-1.
- Orphans, trans. by Jan Steyn and Caite Dolan-Leach (Dalkey Archive Press, 2014). ISBN 978-1628970029.
- Marcel Duchamp: The signature's machine, trans. by Molleen Shilliday, in Breathless Days, 1959, 1960, editors: Serge Guilbaut, John O Brian (Duke University Press, 2017). ISBN 978-0822360414.

=== French ===
Novels

- 2005 Les Orphelins, Allia, J'ai Lu. ISBN 2290355062
- 2007 Les Hérétiques, Flammarion ISBN 2080690124
- 2009 La Restitution, Flammarion ISBN 2081226472

Essays

- 1997 Le Dernier Genet, Histoire des hommes infâmes, Seuil, Fiction & Cie, nommé pour le prix FéminaISBN 2020303485
- 2001 Face à la Pente, in Valère Novarina, Théâtres du verbe, Corti
- 2009 La Machine à signatures, Marcel Duchamp, Incultes, #18
- 2014 Duchamp Déchets, Les hommes, les objets, la catastrophe, Editions du Regard ISBN 2841053253

Non-fiction

- 1999 Le Miroir chinois, Le Seuil. ISBN 2020342987

Poetry

- 1990 au pire, mem/Arte Facts

Articles

- "Marcel Duchamp. La machine à signatures" in inculte, n° 18, 2009, pp. 41–65.
- "Dans le tramway avec W.G Sebald", in Face à Sebald, édition inculte, 2011, pp. 289-305.
- "Court traité de la décision en deux pages", in Jacques Derrida L'événement déconstruction, Les Temps modernes, n° 669–670, Gallimard, July/December 2012.
