= Connie Fife =

Canadian Cree poet and editor (1961–2017)

- Born: August 27, 1961; Prince Albert, Saskatchewan, Canada
- Died: February 3, 2017 (aged 55); Haines Junction, Yukon, Canada
- Occupations: Poet, editor
- Children: Russell Fife

Connie Fife (August 27, 1961 – February 3, 2017) was a Canadian Cree poet and editor. She published three books of poetry, and edited several anthologies of First Nations women's writing. Her work appeared in numerous other anthologies and literary magazines.

Originally from Saskatchewan, she was a longtime resident of Victoria, British Columbia, and resided in Winnipeg, Manitoba, Toronto, Ontario, and Haines Junction, Yukon.

In 2000, she was one of four writers, alongside Dan David, Walter Nanawin and Anna Marie Sewell, awarded the special one-time Prince and Princess Edward Prize in Aboriginal Literature from the Canada Council for the Arts. The jury of the award described her pen as "fearless." From 1990 to 1992 she was a writer-in-residence at the En'owkin School of Writing in Penticton, British Columbia, where she was awarded a fellowship from the Canadian Native Arts Foundation to study creative 1992.

An out lesbian, she served on the jury of the Dayne Ogilvie Prize for LGBT writers in 2014.

In addition to her work as a poet, Fife was an outreach worker for the Urban Native Youth Association in Vancouver, British Columbia.

Fife died in Haines Junction, Yukon, on February 3, 2017, at the age of 55.

== Works ==
=== Poetry ===
- Beneath the Naked Sun (1992)
- Speaking Through Jagged Rock (1999)
- Poems for a New World (2001)

=== Anthologies ===
- Fireweed, Native Women's Issue, No. 26 (1986)
- Gatherings 2 (1991)
- The Colour of Resistance: A Contemporary Collection of Writing by Aboriginal Women (1998)
