= Tea Gerbeza =

Canadian artist and writer

Tea Gerbeza is a Canadian artist and writer based in Regina, Saskatchewan, whose debut poetry collection How I Bend Into More was published in 2025.

The book was shortlisted for the 2025 Dayne Ogilvie Prize for LGBTQ writers.
