= Emilia Nielsen =

Canadian poet and academic

Emilia Nielsen is a Canadian writer and academic. An associate professor in the faculty of social sciences at York University, she has published both poetry and academic literature on the sociological aspects of health and disability.

In 2014, her debut poetry collection Surge Narrows was shortlisted for the Gerald Lampert Award, and in 2019, her second poetry collection Body Work was shortlisted for the Pat Lowther Award and the Lambda Literary Award for Lesbian Poetry. Her first academic work, Disrupting Breast Cancer Narratives: Stories of Rage and Repair, was published by University of Toronto Press in 2019.

Her academic writing has also appeared in scholarly journals such as Canadian Woman Studies, Performance Research and Disability Studies Quarterly, and her creative writing has appeared in Plenitude, The Antigonish Review, Contemporary Verse 2, Descant, The Fiddlehead, Grain, Prairie Fire and Room.
