= Diem Saunders =

Inuk writer and activist from Newfoundland and Labrador, Canada (d. 2021)

Diem Saunders speaking at the National Inquiry into Missing and Murdered Indigenous Women and Girls in Nova Scotia in 2017

Diem Saunders (formerly Delilah Saunders; 1992 – September 7, 2021) was an Inuk writer and activist from Newfoundland and Labrador, Canada, who advocated for missing and murdered Indigenous women and girls.

Saunders and their family came to prominence following the murder of their sister Loretta Saunders in Halifax in 2014, an incident which led to renewed public concern into the crisis of missing and murdered Indigenous women and girls in Canada. The family testified at hearings for the National Inquiry into Missing and Murdered Indigenous Women and Girls in 2017.

In 2016, concerns about the environmental impacts of a planned hydroelectric power project at Labrador's Muskrat Falls on Indigenous communities led to protests, during which Saunders and other activists joined a nearly two-week hunger strike started by local artist Billy Gauthier. Gauthier ended the strike following an agreement between the provincial government and leaders in Labrador's Indigenous community, which established an expert advisory committee. Saunders received Amnesty International's Ambassador of Conscience Award the following year. Later in 2017, Saunders experienced liver failure and was denied placement on a waiting list for a liver transplant because of Ontario's six-month alcohol abstinence requirement for the procedure. Subsequent criticism by Saunders led to a nationwide discussion over the policy.

== Early life ==
Diem Saunders was born to Miriam Terriak and Clayton Saunders in 1992. Saunders's mother Miriam worked as a secretary at a fish producer's cooperative, and their father Clayton worked as a storeman at the local air force base in Happy Valley-Goose Bay in the province of Newfoundland and Labrador. According to Maclean's magazine, Saunders's mother is Inuk and their father is of Inuit and European ancestry. In an article for the SaltWire Network, Saunders wrote that their mother was a victim of emotional, sexual, and mental abuse while attending a residential school, and that their grandparents purchased clothing that would enable their mother and her siblings to appear culturally assimilated and lessen the abuse they would experience in residential schools.

Saunders was raised in Nunatsiavut, an area in Labrador administered by an autonomous Inuit government. The family often assisted members of the community in need, and over time they sheltered dozens of foster children. The children worked together on errands such as wood chopping and preparing large meals and tidying after them. In the summertime, the family frequently visited the beach. The family resided in Happy Valley-Goose Bay and Hopedale as of 2019.

In 2010, Saunders moved to Halifax, Nova Scotia, to be near their sister Loretta, who was studying at Saint Mary's University and writing a thesis on Canada's missing and murdered Indigenous women. The siblings planned to change their surname to Terriak, a traditional name in their family. Saunders later moved to British Columbia.

== Activism ==
=== 2014–2015: Murder of Loretta Saunders and murder trial ===
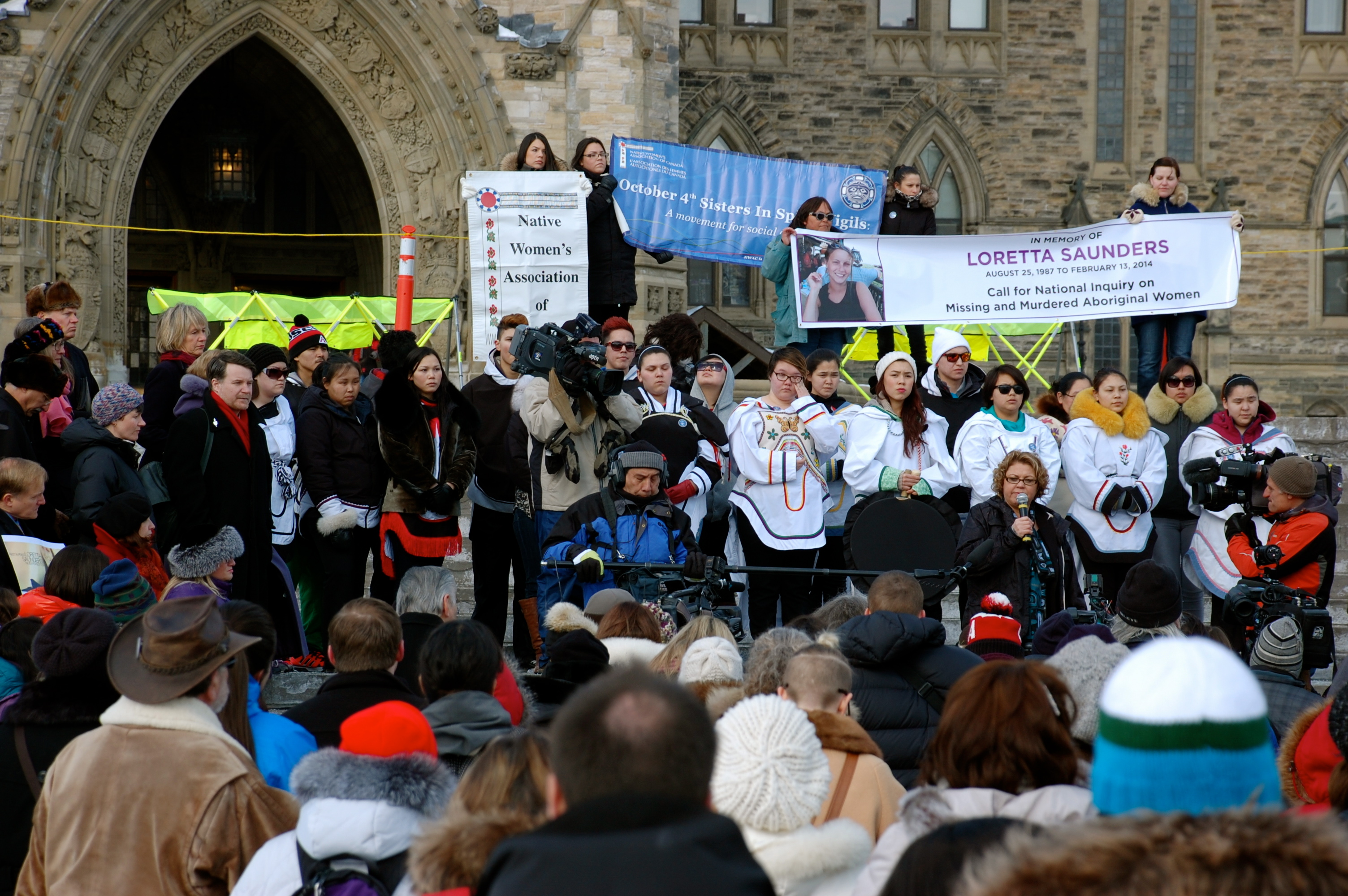
Ottawa vigil held for Loretta Saunders in March 2014

In February 2014, Loretta Saunders was murdered in her Halifax apartment by Blake Leggette and Victoria Henneberry, a couple to which she rented out the apartment. After losing touch with Loretta on Valentine's Day, Saunders flew to Halifax to lead a social media campaign to search for Loretta. Two weeks later, Loretta's body was found on the Trans-Canada Highway in Salisbury, New Brunswick. The murder resulted in national news coverage and renewed concerns for a public inquiry into the crisis of missing and murdered Indigenous women and girls (MMIWG) in Canada.

Saunders created a blog to document their personal experiences following their sister's murder. Another sibling of a murder victim, Kim Johnston, whose sister was killed in Halifax in 2016, befriended Saunders after she read the blog. Saunders said in a 2018 interview that the friendship helped them handle the grief of Loretta's death at the time that Loretta's trial started. Saunders also helped create a scholarship fund named after Loretta, the Loretta Saunders Community Scholarship Fund, available to Indigenous women pursuing post-secondary education in Atlantic Canada, Mi'kma'ki, and Nunatsiavut.

Saunders relocated to Calgary, Alberta later in 2014. Leggette and Henneberry went on trial in 2015, during which they pled guilty to the murder. Saunders helped organize screenings in Atlantic Canada of Matt Smiley's documentary film Highway of Tears, which focuses on cases of women who were murdered or who disappeared on the stretch of British Columbia Highway 16 known as the Highway of Tears. Saunders told CBC News that them and Smiley "really pushed" to hold a film showing in Halifax on the day that the trial started.

=== 2016–2017: Muskrat Falls protests and MMIWG inquiry ===
In 2016, a planned hydroelectric power project at Muskrat Falls, Labrador drew protests because of concerns that flooding of the reservoir would cause unsafe methylmercury levels in Lake Melville and impact wildlife further throughout the water supply, including the Muskrat Falls reservoir. Labradorian artist Billy Gauthier, Jerry Kohlmeister, and Saunders participated in a hunger strike in Ottawa to protest the project. The hunger strike ran for nearly two weeks, until an agreement between premier Dwight Ball and Indigenous community leaders that established an advisory committee of independent experts, which Gauthier said fulfilled his criteria for ending the strike. Saunders praised the decision by the government of Nunatsiavut to decline $10 million offered by the provincial government and Nalcor Energy, the provincial energy corporation operating the Muskrat Falls reservoir, in 2019 as compensation for the provincial government's failure to have surrounding wetlands capped. Nalcor Energy began reservoir flooding for the hydroelectric project later in 2019.

Saunders's apartment in Halifax was burglarized in late 2016, which led to the loss of the single copy of a nearly complete book manuscript about Loretta that Saunders had been writing for the past two years. The manuscript focused on Saunders's relationship with Loretta, and the experience of dealing with her death and navigating the court system.

Amnesty International awarded the 2017 Ambassador of Conscience Award to Saunders and five other individuals involved with the Indigenous rights movement in Canada (Cindy Blackstock, Melanie Morton, Murray Sinclair, Melissa Mollen Dupuis and Widia Larivière), and American singer Alicia Keys. Keys interviewed Saunders in Teen Vogue magazine leading up to the award ceremony. The Saunders family was the first to testify at the hearings for the National Inquiry into Missing and Murdered Indigenous Women and Girls held in the Membertou First Nation, Nova Scotia, in October of that year. The family spoke about Loretta's life and said the attention that Loretta's disappearance received from Halifax police changed after they discovered she was an Inuk woman rather than a white woman. Saunders also spoke about their personal experiences living with Loretta and alleged that the counsellor assigned to them by the Nova Scotia government acted improperly, including touching Saunders's leg and making comments about Loretta's appearance. Around the time of the inquiry, Saunders visited secondary schools in Ontario to speak to students about their experiences. Saunders collaborated with Labrador City composer Andrew Noseworthy on a chamber opera, One Stalk, One Arrow, No Stalk, No Arrow, which had its premiere at the University of Western Ontario that November. The subject of Saunders's first written piece for the opera was the overrepresentation of Indigenous people in Canada's prison population.

=== 2017–2021: Liver transplant controversy and continued activism ===
Saunders experienced liver failure in December 2017. While receiving treatment at Toronto General Hospital in Ontario, Saunders told CBC News their history of alcohol use led them to be denied a place on the waiting list for liver transplants because the Trillium Gift of Life Network, which oversaw organ donations for the province at the time, required candidates with alcohol-associated diseases to abstain from alcohol for six months. Saunders described the policy as antiquated and too restrictive. They said speaking about their sister's murder at MMIWG hearings in October led to a relapse, despite the "huge personal milestones" they had reached in sobriety.

After CBC News reported on Saunders's ineligibility for a transplant, the abstinence policy became the subject of national discussion. Amnesty International and Indigenous organizations called for Saunders's placement onto the waitlist. The Trillium Gift of Life Network released a statement explaining that the policy was established on the advice of physicians and that it was being evaluated in a pilot project the following year that would look for any "evidence-based basis." The Canadian Press reported that some doctors defended the policy using research that suggests some alcoholics begin to drink again after a transplant. Saunders was later discharged from the hospital after doctors said the procedure was not necessary. Later that month, Saunders was treated for pancreatitis at the Health Sciences Centre, in Newfoundland and Labrador. In 2020, a committee overseeing the pilot project by the Trillium Gift of Life Network recommended that the policy be terminated.

In 2018, Saunders wrote an article in the Nova Scotia Advocate criticizing author Shannon Webb-Campbell for not requesting permission from the Saunders family to write graphically about the death of Loretta in the poetry collection Who Took My Sister? Webb-Campbell's publisher Book*hug subsequently announced it had halted the book's sale, distribution, and promotion, and said the book's sales revenue would be donated to the Loretta Saunders Scholarship Fund.

According to SaltWire Network, Saunders was also interested in facilitating access to mental healthcare.

The Newfoundland and Labrador Human Rights Commission posthumously awarded Saunders its 2021 Human Rights Award.

== Personal life ==
=== Name change ===
Saunders was formerly known by the first name Delilah. Saunders came out as non-binary in 2021 and stated they would be changing their first name to Diem; they announced on social media, "I am non-binary and always have been [...] I embrace all of me and don't have a dead name, so address me by Delilah and I won't be upset. Ultimately, I do wish for you to respect my name, Diem."

=== Death ===
Saunders died on September 7, 2021, at their home in Happy Valley-Goose Bay. They were 29 years old. An investigation by the Royal Canadian Mounted Police opened the following day found Saunders's death to be "not criminal in nature".

According to Saunders's mother, Saunders had been using Suboxone for an opioid addiction developed after Loretta's murder, and drank alcohol to deal with the effects of Suboxone withdrawal.
