= Corinna Chong =

Canadian writer

Corinna Chong is a Canadian writer, whose novel Bad Land was longlisted for the 2024 Giller Prize.

Originally from Calgary, Alberta, she currently lives in Kelowna, British Columbia, where she teaches English and fine arts at Okanagan College.

She previously published the novel Belinda's Rings in 2013, and the short story collection The Whole Animal in 2023. In 2021, she won the CBC Short Story Prize for her short story "Kids in Kindergarten", which was included in The Whole Animal.

Bad Land was published in August 2024 by Arsenal Pulp Press.
