= Tiana Reid =

Canadian poet and academic

Tiana Reid is a Canadian poet and academic, whose debut poetry collection Nightnursing was published in 2026.

A Ph.D. graduate of Columbia University, she currently teaches Black literature at York University. She has also written for The New York Times, The New York Review of Books and The Paris Review, and is a co-editor of the cultural magazine Pinko.

Nightnursing was shortlisted for the 2026 Dayne Ogilvie Prize for debut books by LGBTQ writers.
