= Jeffrey Round =

Canadian writer, director, playwright, publisher, and songwriter

- Born: Sudbury, Ontario
- Education: Dalhousie University
- Website: www.jeffreyround.com

Jeffrey Round is a Canadian writer, director, playwright, publisher, and songwriter, who has encouraged the development of LGBT literature, particularly in Canada. His published work includes literary fiction, plays, poetry and mystery novels.

== Background ==
Jeffrey Round studied theatre, literature, psychology and music at Dalhousie University, obtaining a degree in English Literature. He also attended the Humber School for Writers, where he was mentored by writer DM Thomas, as well as Ryerson Polytechnical Institute's Film and Television program. In 1991, while working as an editor for Pink Triangle Press, he founded The Church-Wellesley Review, Canada's first annual print journal for LGBT creative writing, published as a supplement in Xtra! It later became both a reading series and an on-line quarterly, continuing until 2002. The review featured contributions from such notable writers as Jane Rule, Timothy Findley, Douglas LePan and Shyam Selvadurai, and introduced writers Dale Peck, Michael V Smith and Gordon Stewart Anderson among others.

From 1995 to 1998, Round directed Agatha Christie's long-running hit The Mousetrap during its twenty-seven record-breaking years at the Toronto Truck Theatre. In 1992 Round founded the multi-media theatre company Best Boys Productions with then-partner and gay activist John Davison. His first full-length stage play, Zebra, about the real-life murder of librarian Kenneth Zeller, won the Gay and Lesbian Appeal's "Right to Privacy Award" and was nominated for a Pink Trillium for Best Play. The pair produced five other stage works, including Dawn Rae Downton's Blessed and Round's The Michael Ridler Project (Is it art or still … life?), about out gay painter Michael Ridler.

In 2002, his short film My Heart Belongs to Daddy premiered at the Director's View Film Festival in Norwalk, Connecticut. It won awards for Best Canadian Director and Best Use of Music at the Hollywood North Movie Festival, and the Schweppes Prize at what would become the first annual Canadian Film Shorts festival. In 2005, Round was nominated for the KM Hunter Artists Award for Literature for "a body of work" that included fiction, poetry, drama, and literary criticism.

Round is the author of two mystery series featuring gay male protagonists. In 2007, Haworth published The P'Town Murders, the first Bradford Fairfax mystery. In 2012, Dundurn Press published the first Dan Sharp mystery, Lake On The Mountain, winner of the 2013 Lambda Literary Award for Best Gay Mystery.

In 2009, with Shane McConnell, Round began Proust & Company, a musical-literary evening at Glad Day Bookshop in Toronto to help raise awareness of the world's oldest existing LGBT bookstore. The event featured a cross-section of Canadian (mostly) LGBT writers and musicians, including poets Maureen Hines, RM Vaughan and Keith Garebian, novelists Elizabeth Ruth, John Miller, Storm Grant, Karen X Tulchinsky, and Zoe Whittall, essayist Michael Rowe, YA author Steven Bereznai, musicians Omel Masalunga, Geri Aniceto, Jamie Thompson and the Urban Flute Project, and others.

He served on the jury for the 2011 Dayne Ogilvie Prize, a literary award for emerging LGBT writers in Canada, selecting Farzana Doctor as that year's winner.

In 2015, with Michael Erickson of Glad Day Bookshop, Round co-founded and co-named the Naked Heart LGBT Festival of Words, which became Canada's most racially diverse literary event. He has also served as the Ontario Representative for The Writers' Union of Canada.

Round has also worked as a producer and writer for Alliance-Atlantis and the Canadian Broadcasting Corporation. As a songwriter he has composed for, and performed and recorded with, acclaimed Canadian soprano Lilac Caña.

In addition, he has written about and credited such diverse cultural figures as Glenn Gould, Janis Joplin, John Lennon, Sylvia Plath, James Dean, Joni Mitchell, Tennessee Williams, Vincent van Gogh, Oscar Wilde, F. Scott Fitzgerald, Anton Webern, Marcel Proust, Gabriel Fauré and William Shakespeare with the shaping of his creative vision.

A long-time resident of Toronto, he has also lived in London, England, and Milan, Italy.

== Career as an author ==
Round's first novel, A Cage of Bones, was published by the Gay Men's Press in the UK. Based on Round's experiences as a fashion model in Italy and England, the book topped bestseller lists around the world. A comic mystery, The P-Town Murders, first in the Bradford Fairfax series, was published by Haworth Books in the US in 2007. Both titles were listed on AfterElton's Top 100 Greatest Gay Books in 2008.

In 2009, Cormorant Books released Death In Key West, the second Fairfax mystery. The Honey Locust, Round's literary novel about the Bosnian war, followed in the same year and was nominated for a ReLit Award for Literature.

In 2012, Dundurn Press published Lake on the Mountain, first in the Dan Sharp mystery series, which won the Lambda Literary Award for Best Gay Mystery in 2013. The series, which focuses on gay private investigator Dan Sharp, continued with Pumpkin Eater (2014), The Jade Butterfly (2015) and After the Horses (2015), the latter garnering Round his second Lambda nomination.

In 2014, Round's poetry collection, In the Museum of Leonardo da Vinci, was published by Tightrope Books. It too received a ReLit nomination, this time for poetry. The book is dedicated to his father, who died before its publication.

Also in 2014, Round published Vanished in Vallarta, the third Bradford Fairfax mystery, under his own publishing imprint, which in 2008 published the revised second edition of A Cage of Bones after retrieving the rights from GMP.

In 2016, Dundurn published Round's Endgame, a total rewriting and recreation of Agatha Christie's bestselling mystery And Then There Were None. It became one of Dundurn's bestselling US titles, bringing Round new accolades from such writers as Joan Barfoot, who, in her IFP review of June 15, 2016, called him one of Dame Agatha's "putative heirs."

In 2016, Round signed a three-book deal with Dundurn to continue his successful run of Dan Sharp mysteries. These include The God Game, Shadow Puppet and Collateral. There are numerous other projects in the works, including Bon Ton Roulez, the fourth volume in the Bradford Fairfax series.

== Theatre work ==
In 1992, Round co-founded Best Boys Productions, an experimental theatre company, together with John Davison. The company was in operation for five years and produced, among other works, Round's Right to Privacy Award-winning play, Zebra, about the murder of Toronto librarian Kenneth Zeller in High Park in 1985. At the same time, Round was the stage director for Agatha Christie's The Mousetrap, Canada's longest-running stage production, at the Toronto Truck Theatre.

== Film work ==
Round wrote and directed the short film My Heart Belongs to Daddy in 2003. He has also released two documentary films, BLOSSOM: A Portrait of Lilac Caña (2009) and Driving With Rusty (2010), a film about the late Rusty Ryan.

== Bibliography ==
=== Novels ===
- A Cage of Bones (GMP, 1997, ISBN 978-0-85449-252-7)
- The P'Town Murders: A Bradford Fairfax Murder Mystery (Haworth Press 2007, ISBN 978-1-56023-662-7)
- The P-Town Murders: A Bradford Fairfax Murder Mystery (Cormorant Books, 2008, ISBN 978-1-897151-28-0)
- Death in Key West: A Bradford Fairfax Murder Mystery (Cormorant Books, 2009, ISBN 978-1-897151-43-3)
- The Honey Locust (Cormorant Books, 2009, ISBN 978-1-897151-38-9)
- Lake on the Mountain: A Dan Sharp Mystery (Dundurn Press, 2012 ISBN 978-1-459700-01-7)
- Pumpkin Eater: A Dan Sharp Mystery (Dundurn Press, 2014 ISBN 978-1-459708-17-4)
- Vanished in Vallarta: A Bradford Fairfax Murder Mystery (Rounder Publications, 2014 ISBN 978-098106-06-20)
- The Jade Butterfly: A Dan Sharp Mystery (Dundurn Press, 2015 ISBN 978-1459-721852)
- After the Horses: A Dan Sharp Mystery (Dundurn Press, 2015 ISBN 978-1459-731318)
- Endgame (Dundurn Press, 2016 ISBN 978-1459-733251)
- The God Game: A Dan Sharp Mystery (Dundurn Press, 2018 ISBN 978-1-45974-010-5)

=== Poetry ===
- for our mothers (The New Quarterly, Vol. X, no. 4, Winter 1991)
- Turn (The Antigonish Review, No. 85-85, 1991)
- time and the nature of being; vacation incident (Nexus, Vol. 5, no.1, Spring 1992)
- new song/old rag and bone (Ammonite, Issue 5, March 1992)
- Barque of Metaphor (The White Rose, Issue 24)
- Wednesday Morning Launderette (LiNQ, Vol. 19, no. 2, 1992)
- winter garden (Ariel, Vol. 24, No. 3, July 1993)
- Aria (The Prairie Journal of Canadian Literature, Issue No. 20)
- Autumn Lessons (The Prairie Journal of Canadian Literature, Issue No. 34)
- Friends; Father (The New Quarterly, Vol. XVII, no. 3, Fall 1997)
- Arrangements (Paperplates, Vol. 4 no. 1 Spring 2000 (web))
- Burning, remembering – 6 Dec '91 ((EX)CITE Journal of Contemporary Writing, Premiere Issue, Spring 2001)
- Small Furies (Canadian Literature, No. 182, Autumn 2004)
- Six poems: Humpback, Dissolve, Flown, Beggar, midstream, Bloor Line, North Beach CA (Maple Tree Literary Supplement (Issue #2) edited by Amatoritsero Ede)
- The One In The Mirror (for Trent Hurry) (Q Review, Dec 2010)
- Rebel (On reviewing Nicholas Ray's Rebel Without a Cause) (I found It at the Movies: An Anthology of Film Poems, Coach House Books, Ruth Roach Pierson, editor, 2014)
- In the Museum of Leonardo da Vinci (Tightrope Books, 2014)

=== Anthologies ===
- "A Perfect Time to Be in Paris" in Bend Sinister (Peter Burton, ed. GMP-UK, 2002.)
- "Queen for a Day" in Bent on Writing (Elizabeth Ruth, ed. Canadian Scholars Press, 2002)
- "Isle of Women" in A Casualty of War: The Arcadia Book of Gay Short Stories (Peter Burton, ed. Arcadia Books, 2008)
- "Don Juan and the Queen of the Gypsies" in Don Juan and Men (Caro Soles, ed. MLR Press, 2009)
- "This Is Not Your Country" in Boy Crazy (Richard Labonté, ed. Cleis Press, 2009)
- "Mouse" in Men of the Mean Streets (G. Herren/J.D. Redman, eds. Bold Strokes, 2011)
- "Rebel (On reviewing Nicholas Ray's Rebel Without a Cause)" in I found It at the Movies: An Anthology of Film Poems (Ruth Roach Pierson, ed. Coach House Books, 2014)
- "Speak My Language" in Speak My Language and Other Stories (Torsten Hojer, ed. Little Brown UK, 2015)

== Filmography ==
- My Heart Belongs to Daddy (2003)
- BLOSSOM: A Portrait of Lilac Caña (2009)
- Driving With Rusty (2010)
