= Murder of Loretta Saunders =

Murder case that spanned the Canadian Maritimes

Loretta Saunders
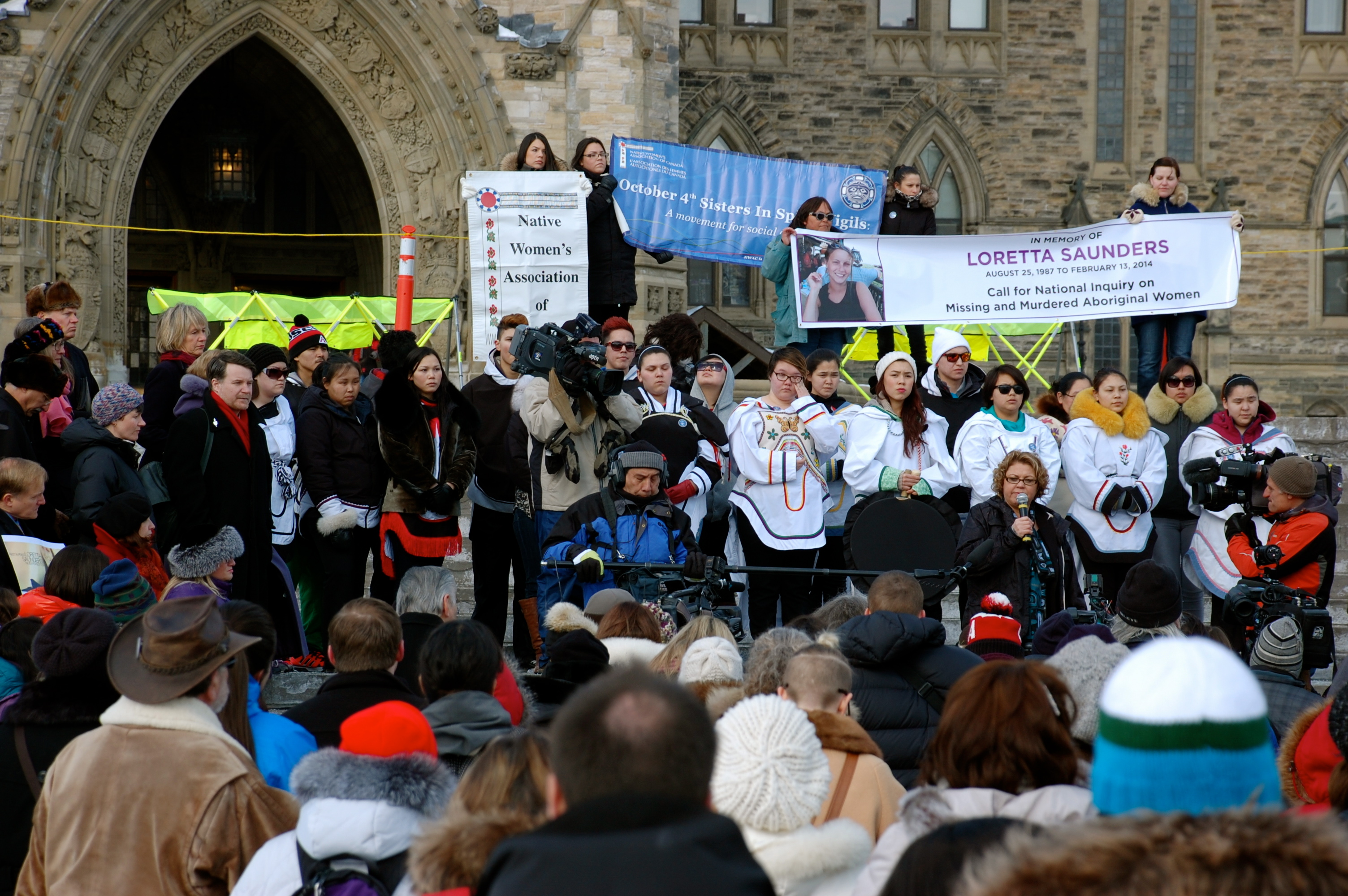
- Memorial Vigil for Loretta Saunders, March 5, 2014
- Born: Loretta Barbara Grace Saunders; August 25, 1987; Happy Valley-Goose Bay, Newfoundland and Labrador, Canada
- Disappeared: February 13, 2014 (aged 26); Halifax, Nova Scotia, Canada
- Died: c. February 13, 2014 (aged 26)
- Body discovered: Near Salisbury, New Brunswick, Canada

Loretta Saunders (August 25, 1987 – c. February 13, 2014) was an Inuk woman who lived in Halifax, Nova Scotia, Canada. She was a Saint Mary's University criminology student writing an honors thesis on Missing and Murdered Indigenous Women in Canada. Saunders was last seen on February 13, 2014. She was reported missing on February 17, and her body was found on February 26 near Salisbury, New Brunswick.

After the discovery of Saunders' body, as well as Saunders' car in their possession, her roommates were quickly charged and pled guilty to her murder.

In the aftermath of Saunders' and Tina Fontaine's high-profile murders, advocate groups, including the #AmINext campaign, pushed for a National Inquiry into Missing and Murdered Indigenous Women and Girls (MMIWG), which was announced in 2015 and officially launched in 2017, by the Trudeau government.

== Biography ==
Loretta Saunders was born in Happy Valley-Goose Bay, Newfoundland and Labrador to Inuit parents Miriam Terriak and Clayton Saunders. Saunders was the fifth born biological child in a blended family. Her parents had children from previous relationships and frequently fostered Aboriginal children in their community.

After an alleged sexual assault at her school, Saunders left school and moved to Montreal, where she lived on the streets and struggled with substance abuse. Saunders returned to Newfoundland some years later to work and finish high school. After she completed high school, Saunders was accepted into Saint Mary's University in Halifax. Saunders' family has shared that Loretta wanted to continue her schooling and attend law school after graduation.

Saunders was working on her graduate thesis on MMIWG. Her graduate funding for this project was not approved. To cover expenses, Saunders rented her home to Blake Leggette and Victoria Henneberry.

At the time of her murder, Saunders was expecting her first child with her boyfriend of 2.5 years, Yalcin Surkultay.

== Disappearance and murder ==
After not speaking to Saunders for a few days and receiving odd text messages from her cell phone number, Saunders' family reported her missing to police on February 17, 2014. Her 2000 Toyota Celica was found the next day in the possession of her roommates, Blake Leggette and Victoria Henneberry, in Harrow, Ontario. After this discovery, Saunders' roommates were charged with her murder.

On February 26, 2014, Saunders' body was found in a hockey bag, on the side of the Trans-Canada Highway near Salisbury, New Brunswick, Canada. Saunders is thought to have been killed on February 13, 2014, at her home in Halifax. Both Henneberry and Leggette confessed to Saunders' murder.

Leggette admitted that he attacked Saunders, choking her, attempting to suffocate her by putting plastic bags over her head, then hit her head against the floor. Henneberry and Leggette then placed Saunders’ body in a hockey bag and put her in the trunk of her own car; the couple then stole her car. The couple texted her family and boyfriend pretending to be Saunders, attempting to cover their crime. Henneberry and Leggette also attempted to gain information from Saunders' family via these text messages to access her bank accounts.

== Trial ==
Henneberry and Leggette both pleaded guilty to the murder of Saunders. Henneberry pleaded guilty to second-degree murder and Leggette to first-degree murder. Henneberry received life imprisonment with no eligibility for parole for 10 years and Leggette was sentenced to life in prison with no eligibility of parole for 25 years.

At trial, Henneberry and Leggette stated they murdered Saunders over $430 in rent they owed to Saunders.

== Media coverage ==
Media coverage of Loretta Saunders' murder was markedly different from the media coverage of other murdered of Indigenous women and girls. After the discovery of her body, media and political sources argued that due to Saunders' features, Loretta Saunders was 'white-passing', with blue eyes, fair hair and light skin, her death did not have to do with her Indigenous identity or the MMIWG Inquiry. Multiple news sources reported that Saunders' was originally thought to be white by police, only to be corrected by Saunders' family.

=== Comparison to Tina Fontaine ===
Tina Fontaine was an Anishinaabe teenager from Sagkeeng First Nation who was reported missing and died in August 2014. Though both Fontaine and Saunders had a history of substance abuse, this was only heavily covered in the media about Fontaine. The media also created 'victim blaming' narratives about the substances in Fontaine's body at the time of her death.

Unlike in Saunders' case, Tina Fontaine's accused murderer, Raymond Joseph Cormier, was acquitted in 2018.

== #AmINext campaign ==
The #AmINext campaign was started by Saunders cousin, Holly Jarrett. Jarrett started the campaign in response to the murder of her cousin Loretta and of Tina Fontaine. The #AmINext campaign was active during 2014–2015, and successfully advocated for the then-in-power Stephen Harper government to begin an internal investigation into the Royal Canadian Mounted Police's handling of MMIWG cases. Up to that point the Harper government was hesitant to call a national inquiry, with Harper stating: “I think we should not view this [the murder of Tina Fontaine] as sociological phenomenon”.

After the election of Justin Trudeau's government in 2015, a national inquiry into MMIWG was announced. The inquiry officially began in 2017 and the final report was published in 2019

== MMIWG inquiry ==
Loretta Saunders' parents and siblings provided testimony on first day of the MMIWG inquiry hearing at Membertou First Nation in Cape Breton, Nova Scotia. In their testimony, Saunders' family alleged that their relationship with the police changed for the worse after their revelation that Saunders' was Inuk. Saunders' sibling, Diem Saunders, also alleged that the court appointed grief counsellor made unwanted sexual advances during their sessions.

The MMIWG National Inquiry went on to interview more than 2,380 persons for the report on MMIWG in Canada. The final report was released in 2019 and contains "231 Calls for Justice directed at governments, institutions, social service providers, industries and all Canadians."

== Aftermath ==
=== Memorials and vigils ===
Saunders' alma mater, Saint Mary's University, held a memorial service for Saunders on their campus in March 2014.

Vigils for Loretta Saunders were held in many cities across Canada after her death.

The Loretta Saunders Community Scholarship Fund was set up in 2014 in memory of Loretta Saunders, in part by Dr. Darryl Leroux (Saunders' thesis supervisor) and the Community Foundation of Nova Scotia.

=== Saunders family ===
Saunders' sibling, Diem Saunders, was committed to carrying on their sister's legacy until their death in September 2021. They began a blog titled "A Homicide Survivor's Journey Through Grief" and became an active social justice activist, which included testifying at National Inquiry into Murdered and Missing Women and Girls in October 2017. They also shared their story of the loss of their sister in schools, wrote an opera about MMIWG, and wrote for various news sources.

=== Controversy surrounding Shannon Webb-Campbell's Who Took My Sister? ===
In 2018, Mi'kmaq poet Shannon Webb-Campbell published a collection of poetry that included a poem about the murder of Loretta Saunders. Saunders' family spoke out against the book and revealed that Webb-Campbell did not seek permission from them prior to the publication of the book. Following this, it was revealed that Webb-Campbell had not spoken to any of the families of those who were depicted in her book. In response Book*hug, the publisher of Who Took My Sister?, removed the book from sale and stopped distribution. Book*hug also donated the revenues from the book to the Loretta Saunders Community Scholarship Fund.

Webb-Campbell apologized to all of the families personally and republished the heavily edited book in collaboration with Lee Maracle.

=== Appeals ===
Victoria Henneberry sought to withdraw her guilty plea in 2017. Her appeal was denied by the Nova Scotia Court of Appeal in April 2017.

=== Controversy regarding Victoria Henneberry's claim to Indigenous heritage ===
It is unclear as to when Henneberry began claiming Indigenous ancestry, but has begun to identify as 'American Cherokee' during her incarceration. Community members, including Loretta Saunders' family, oppose this claim to Indigenous ancestry as well as Henneberry's access to Aboriginal supports.

In 2019, Victoria Henneberry attempted to gain release from prison with the assistance of an Indigenous women's support centre, but the centre denied her application.

In 2020, Victoria Henneberry sought an escorted pass to attend an Indigenous women's sharing and drumming circle. A parole board that included Indigenous Elders granted Henneberry a pass to attend the Indigenous women's sharing and drumming circle in February 2020. This pass was rescinded shortly after due to public outcry and Henneberry is now prohibited from accessing Indigenous services.

== See also ==
- #AmINext
- List of solved missing person cases (post-2000)
- Missing and Murdered Indigenous Women
