= AmINext =

Social media campaign

#AmINext is a social media campaign launched on September 5, 2014, by Inuit Canadian Holly Jarrett, to call attention to the high rate of missing and murdered Indigenous women in Canada. It was one of many awareness campaigns initiated by activists since 2000.

Jarrett began her hashtag campaign after starting a Change.org petition in August 2014 calling for a government inquiry into the issue of missing and murdered Indigenous women. Both efforts were related to the murders of her cousin Lorraine Saunders and of the administration of Justin Trudeau announced initiation of such an inquiry in December 2015; it was started in 2016.

At the time of its launch, the #AmINext campaign called on the Conservative government, then headed by Stephen Harper, to acknowledge the pattern of violence. The campaign received widespread coverage across Canada following its launch due to simultaneous news reports releasing details of the Fontaine case. On September 11, 2014, the BBC aired a segment on the campaign, which resulted in international coverage. As of March 2016, the petition on Change.org has received over 300,000 signatures.

== Background ==
In February 2014, Loretta Saunders (Inuit) was murdered by her roommates in an argument over rent money. Saunders was preparing to graduate from Saint Mary's University in Halifax and was working on a thesis regarding the missing and murdered Indigenous women of Canada. Following the September 2014 murder of Tina Fontaine, another young Indigenous woman, Saunders' cousin Holly Jarrett founded the #AmINext campaign to carry on her cousin's efforts to increase national awareness about violence against Indigenous women. Jarrett said that she wanted to encourage a national dialogue about an issue that she felt was often invisible to non-Indigenous Canadians.

To participate, social media users were invited to post "selfie" photographs holding signs displaying the hashtag, and include a short message about why they were participating in the campaign. For more than a decade, Indigenous activists had been seeking a national government inquiry into the disproportionate rate of violence and murders perpetuated against Indigenous women. Demands for such an inquiry were reignited following the murder of Fontaine.

After starting the hashtag campaign, Jarrett announced that she was producing a documentary about Saunders and the underlying sociopolitical factors contributing to the high proportion of violence against Indigenous women. In June 2016, Jarrett on her change.org site that she had met with both Carolyn Bennett, Minister of Indigenous and Northern Affairs, and Patty Hadju, Minister of Status of Women, appointees of the newly elected Trudeau Government. During this meeting Jarrett discussed the personal responses to the crisis from petition signers and #AmINext participants.

== Response of Harper Administration ==
The Stephen Harper administration had been accused of downplaying cultural rights of Aboriginals and refusing to create an inquiry to investigate the high rates of violence against indigenous women. Prior to Jarrett's starting her #AmINext campaign, Prime Minister Harper had generated outrage by saying that the pattern of violence was caused by individual perpetrators rather than any underlying "sociological phenomenon"; he said he would not undertake a national inquiry. Following the #AmINext campaign, the Harper Government issued an action plan for an internal Royal Canadian Mounted Police (RCMP) investigation into MMIW; its report was published in 2014, with an update in 2015. The RCMP found that between 1980 and 2015, 1,049 indigenous women had been murdered, 175 had disappeared, and more than 100 were still missing. It documented that Aboriginal women were "over-represented" among Canada's missing and murdered women.

== Political aftermath ==
Although the #AmINext campaign was most active during the fall of 2014, its social media presence was revitalized during the federal election campaign in 2015. Justin Trudeau addressed the violence against Indigenous women in his electoral campaign, promising a national inquiry into the matter as one of his first acts of duty. On December 8, 2015, Trudeau announced that a national inquiry into the missing and murdered Indigenous women would take place. Since then, Patty Hadju, the Canadian Minister for the Status of Women, has said that the number of missing and murdered Indigenous women may be as high as 4,000. She used data and estimates by an activist group.

== Criticisms of #AmINext ==
Some criticized the campaign for focusing on potential victims of Indigenous violence but not acknowledging the documented victims. Additionally, social media users said that asking "Am I Next?" suggests that victimhood is inevitable and revokes power from those vulnerable to violence. Sarah Raineville started #ImNotNext in order to avoid encouraging a culture of victimhood; since then, other social media users have focused on the empowerment of Indigenous women. Jarrett responded that she was glad there was public dialogue about the issue.

== Associated campaigns ==
- REDress Project
- Walking With Our Sisters
- Idle No More

== See also ==
- Finding Dawn
