= Lisa Foad =

Canadian writer and journalist

Lisa Foad is a Canadian short story writer and journalist. Her debut collection, The Night Is a Mouth, won the 2009 ReLit Award for short fiction, as well as an Honour of Distinction citation from the Writers' Trust of Canada's 2010 Dayne Ogilvie Grant for an emerging LGBTQ writer.

Foad is also a regular contributor to Xtra Magazine, the LGBT community newspaper in Toronto.

== Books ==
- The Night Is a Mouth (2009)
