= Brian Francis (writer) =

Canadian writer (born 1971)

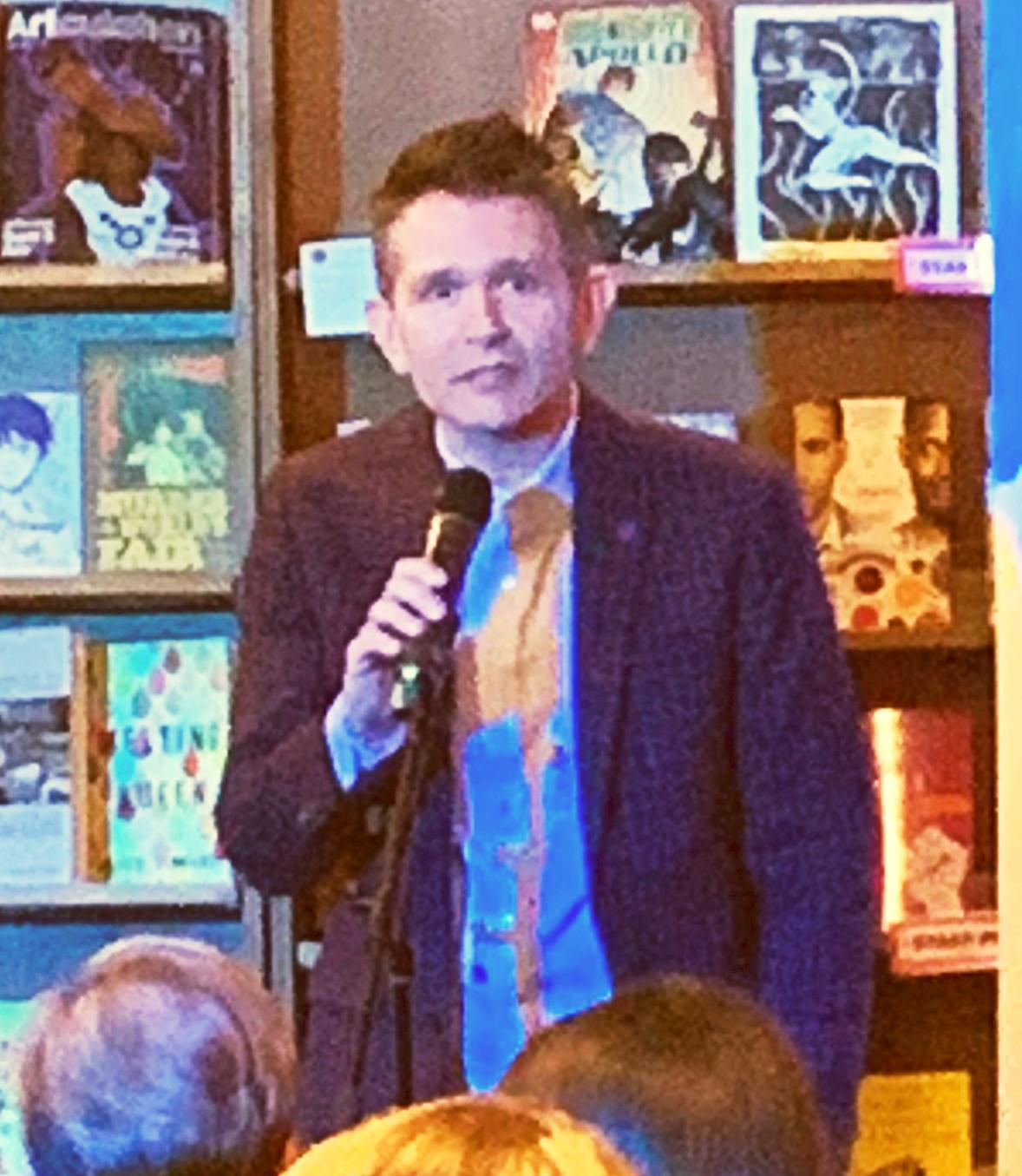
- Francis speaking at Glad Day Bookshop in Toronto in 2019
- Born: 1971 (age 54–55); Sarnia, Ontario, Canada
- Occupation: Novelist
- Writing career
- Period: 2000s-present
- Notable work: Fruit
- Website: brian-francis.com

Brian Francis (born 1971) is a Canadian writer best known for his 2004 debut novel Fruit.

== Career ==
=== Fruit ===
Francis' debut 2004 novel Fruit was published in Canada by ECW Press and released on May 4, 2004. Fruit is the story of Peter Paddington, a teenager living in Sarnia. Overweight, gay and a social outsider, Paddington regularly retreats into an active fantasy life which includes his own nipples talking to him, and the novel traces his journey toward self-acceptance.

The novel was published in paperback format in the United States by Harper Perennial on August 2, 2005, under the title The Secret Fruit of Peter Paddington. In 2014, Amazon included the novel on its list of "100 Canadian Books to Read in a Lifetime."

Fruit was well received by critics, with Entertainment Weekly referring to it as "sweet, tart, and forbidden in all the right places."

The novel was selected for the 2009 edition of Canada Reads, where it was championed by novelist and CBC Radio One broadcaster Jen Sookfong Lee. It finished the competition as the runner-up, making the last vote against the eventual winner, Lawrence Hill's The Book of Negroes.

In January 2022, Toronto production company Hawkeye Pictures and Ottawa’s Big Jump Entertainment announced they were planning to develop Fruit as an animated series.

=== Natural Order ===
Francis' second novel, Natural Order, published by Doubleday Canada, was released on August 23, 2011. The novel tells the story of a mother coming to terms with the death of her adult son.

Natural Order was positively reviewed by critics and made Best Books of 2011 lists by the Toronto Star and The Georgia Straight. The novel was shortlisted for the Ontario Library Association's 2012 Evergreen Award and 2012 CBC Bookie Awards. Natural Order was a Top 40 selection for Canada Reads 2014.

=== Break in Case of Emergency ===
Francis' third novel, Break in Case of Emergency, was published on September 10, 2019, by HarperCollins Canada and marked his young adult debut. The novel, about a 15-year-old girl and her estranged female impersonator father, deals with issues about teen mental health, suicide and sexual orientation. The novel was well received by critics, with Apple Books calling it a "knockout," and The Globe and Mail saying it "packs a powerful punch." The novel was also chosen as a Best Book of 2019 by The Globe and Mail, Quill & Quire, Apple Books and CBC Books. The novel was published in the United States in February 2020 by Inkyard Press.

Break in Case of Emergency was selected as a finalist for the 2019 Governor General's Award for English-language children's literature. The novel was also nominated for a 2021 Forest of Reading White Pine Award for fiction.

=== Box 4901 ===
In August 2018, Francis debuted a performance piece, Box 4901, as part of the Summerworks Lab Series. Directed and co-created by Rob Kempson, featuring a cast of 13 actors and performed in part by Francis himself, Box 4901 recounts Francis's attempt at finding love via a personal ad he placed in 1992. NOW magazine gave the piece 5 Ns and said it was full of "wisdom, humour and heartbreaking honesty." The Globe and Mail called the piece a "knockout," "fascinating," and "haunting."

In May 2019, Timeshare Performance announced Box 4901 would be part of the Buddies in Bad Times' 2019/2020 season, running from February 27 to March 8, 2020. Box 4901 performed to sold-out audiences. CBC called it a “profound must-see,” Mooney on Theatre called it “a lovely memoir that is absolutely worth seeing,” and NOW magazine said that “Francis’s writing has the sparkle of the best of David Sedaris, and his insights into his life are heartbreaking in their honesty.” The cast of Box 4901 included Colin Asuncion, Hume Baugh, Samson Bonkeabantu Brown, Keith Cole, daniel jelani ellis, Daniel Krolik, Michael Hughes, Indrit Kasapi, Eric Morin, G Kyle Shields, Chy Ryan Spain and Geoffrey Whynot. Box 4901 was nominated for three 2020 Dora Mavor Moore Awards, including Outstanding Performance by an Ensemble (Independent Theatre Division), Outstanding Lighting Design (Independent Theatre Division) and Outstanding Sound Design/Composition (Independent Theatre Division).

On August 17, 2021, Francis published the book version of Box 4901, retitled Missed Connections: A Memoir in Letters Never Sent. It was selected as a Loan Stars August 2021 Adult Top 10 Pick, and the Toronto Star called it “thoughtful, funny, poignant, insightful and honest.” The book was selected as one of five finalists for the 2022 Trillium Book Awards.

=== Other writing ===
In 2011, Francis created Caker Cooking, a weekly humour blog featuring "the best of the worst of mangiacake cuisine."

In March 2015, Quill & Quire magazine debuted Francis' advice column, "Ask the Agony Editor". The monthly humour column fielded questions from readers about publishing and writing.

In its Summer 2018 issue, Taddle Creek magazine debuted a humour food column by Francis that featured retro and vintage recipes from Francis's collection of community cookbooks.

Francis, who is gay, has also written for the Toronto publications Xtra! and NOW.

== Awards ==
He was awarded an Honour of Distinction citation by the Writers' Trust of Canada's Dayne Ogilvie Prize, a literary award for emerging LGBT writers in Canada, in 2008. In 2010, he served on the Dayne Ogilvie Prize jury, selecting Nancy Jo Cullen as that year's prize winner.

== See also ==
- List of people from Sarnia
- Canadian literature
