= Dennis E. Bolen =

Canadian novelist

Dennis E. Bolen is a Canadian novelist, poet, editor, teacher and journalist. His work is often about the Canadian justice system, where he worked for 20 years. The novel Kaspoit! is a fictionalized account of British Columbia's missing women scandal, in which at least 60 women disappeared over a 20-year period.

In 1989, Bolen helped establish the international literary journal sub-TERRAIN and served there as fiction editor for ten years. He has published five novels, three books of short fiction and one book of poetry. The Encyclopædia Britannica's Literature Year In Review 1995 said of his novel Stand In Hell '...focused on the Holocaust from an opposite angle...the story of a teacher with his own sins to contend with who searches for the truth about his grandfather's complicity in Nazi war crimes.'

First published in 1975 (Canadian Fiction magazine), Bolen holds a BA in creative writing from the University of Victoria (1977) and an MFA (writing) from the University of British Columbia (1989). He taught introductory creative writing at UBC from 1995 to 1997.

Bolen has acted as a community editorial board member of the Vancouver Sun, and is on the boards of a literacy advocacy organization, a literary collective and a theatre company. He has written criticism, social commentary, arts advocacy and editorial opinion for numerous journals and newspapers in Canada. Since the mid-1990s, he has written literary criticism for The Vancouver Sun, The Georgia Straight, sub-TERRAIN, and Event Magazine.

== Publications ==
- Stupid Crimes, novel, Anvil Press, Vancouver, 1992.
- Stupid Crimes (revised), novel, Vintage, Toronto, 1994.
- Stand in Hell, novel, Random House, Toronto, 1995.
- Krekshuns, novel, Random House, Toronto, 1997.
- Gas Tank and Other Stories, short fiction, Anvil Press, Vancouver, 1998.
- Toy Gun, novel, Anvil Press, Vancouver, 2005.
- Kaspoit!, novel, Anvil Press, Vancouver, 2009.
- Anticipated Results, linked short fiction, Arsenal Pulp Press, Vancouver, 2011.
- "Black Liquor", poetry, Caitlin Press, Halfmoon Bay, 2013.
- Amaranthine Chevrolet, novel, Dundurn Press, Toronto, 2025.
