= Leah Horlick =

Canadian poet

- Born: Saskatoon, Saskatchewan
- Occupation: poet
- Writing career
- Period: 2010s–present
- Notable works: Riot Lung, For Your Own Good
- Notable awards: Dayne Ogilvie Prize
- Website: www.leahhorlick.com

Leah Horlick is a Canadian poet, who won the Dayne Ogilvie Prize for lesbian, gay, bisexual and transgender writers in 2016.

She has published two poetry collections, Riot Lung (2012) and For Your Own Good (2015). Riot Lung was a nominee for the ReLit Award for poetry and the Saskatchewan Book Award in 2013, and For Your Own Good was named a Stonewall Honour Book by the Stonewall Book Awards. For Your Own Good was inspired by her experience of being sexually assaulted by her first girlfriend after coming out as lesbian, and finding a dearth of literature on same-sex assault to help her process the experience.

Originally from Saskatoon, Saskatchewan, she was educated at the University of Saskatchewan. She is currently based in Vancouver, British Columbia, where she is co-curator with Estlin McPhee of the Reverb reading series for LGBT writers.
