= Jillian Christmas =

Canadian poet

Jillian Christmas is a Canadian poet from Vancouver, British Columbia. Her work focuses on anti-colonial narratives, family, heritage, and identity. She is most noted as the 2021 winner of the League of Canadian Poets' Sheri-D Wilson Golden Beret Award for spoken word poetry. Furthermore, she has represented both Vancouver and Toronto at 11 national poetry events and was the first Canadian to make the final stage at the Women of the World Poetry Slam.

Being born and raised on First Nation territories, and now living in Vancouver's first nation territories, much of Christmas' inspiration comes from colonialism and oppression as she lives in spaces of long-lasting colonial impacts, and she writes about her experiences with this.

Her published debut collection, The Gospel of Breaking, was also a shortlisted finalist for both the Gerald Lampert Award and the Pat Lowther Award in the same year. The Gospel of Breaking is her first poetry collection novel, focusing on Jillian's political beliefs, family, sexuality, and storytelling about love, friends, and community. She has also written the children's books The Magic Shell and My Sweet Baby Book. My Sweet Baby Book debuted at #6 on the BC Bestseller List.

She is a former artistic director of Vancouver's Verses Festival of Words. She is queer, and won the 2021 Dayne Ogilvie Prize for LGBTQ Canadian writers.

== Debut novel: The Gospel of Breaking ==
The Gospel of Breaking is her first poetry collection novel, focusing on Jillian's identity, family, and community. Christmas spent time visiting her grandmother in Tobago to write pieces for her novel because family heritage is a "critical piece" of The Gospel of Breaking. Her poetry collection focuses on her "re-imaging of what home was" and how she grew her connection with her Tobagan roots.

== Literary partnerships ==
=== Jillian's poetry has been featured in ===
- Matrix New Queer Writing;
- The Huffington Post;
- The Post Feminist Post;
- Plentitude Magazine;
- Room Magazine;
- The Great Black North.

=== She has partnered with ===
- Toronto Poetry Project;
- Wordplay;
- Brendan McLeod's Travelling Slam;
- University of British Columbia;
- Vancouver Opera;
- The CLUTCH Mentorship.
