= Ashok Mathur =

Ashok Mathur is a South Asian (Indo-Canadian) cultural organizer, writer and visual artist. Prior to this he was the head of Creative Studies and a professor in the Department of Creative Studies at the University of British Columbia, Okanagan campus. As a Canada Research Chair in Cultural and Artistic Inquiry, he also directed the Centre for Innovation in Culture and the Arts in Canada (CiCAC).

== Early life and education ==
Mathur was born in Bhopal, India; in 1962, at the age of one, he emigrated with his family to Canada. He worked as a journalist from 1981 to 1985, and then completed his studies at the University of Calgary, earning a bachelor's degree, master of arts, and Ph.D. Prior to joining Thompson Rivers in 2005, he taught at the Emily Carr Institute of Art and Design.

== Works ==
Mathur is the author of a volume of poetic prose (Loveruage; a dance in three parts, Wolsak and Wynn, 1994), a long poem ("The First White Black Man", monograph press, 2017) and three novels:

- Once Upon an Elephant (Arsenal Pulp Press, 1998, ISBN 978-1-55152-058-2) recounts the story of the birth of Ganesh as a Canadian courtroom drama.
- The Short, Happy Life of Harry Kumar (Arsenal Pulp Press, 2002, ISBN 978-1-55152-113-8) was nominated for the Commonwealth Writers' Prize, and blends the Ramayana with modern Canada.
- A Little Distillery in Nowgong (Arsenal Pulp Press, 2009, ISBN 978-1-55152-258-6) follows three generations of a Parsi family from India to North America. Along with the novel, Mathur also produced an associated art installation, which was shown in Vancouver, Ottawa, and Kamloops.

Additionally, Mathur's artwork "one hundred thirty-three thousand five hundred twenty-eight words and a super-8 grab" was part of a 2009 acquisition by the Canada Council Art Bank.
