= David Nandi Odhiambo =

Canadian writer (born 1965)

David Nandi Odhiambo (born June 24, 1965), also known as D. Nandi Odhiambo is an African-Canadian novelist and writer of Luo and Luhya descent. He was born in Nairobi, Kenya, and moved to Winnipeg, Manitoba, Canada, in 1977. He has a PhD in English Literature from the University of Hawaiʻi at Mānoa, an MFA in creative writing from the University of Massachusetts Amherst, and a B.A. in classics from McGill University. In 2019 he was one of two recipients of the Elliot Cades Award for Literature, considered among the most prestigious literary honors bestowed in Hawaiʻi. As of fall 2019, he is an associate professor of English at the University of Hawaiʻi at West Oʻahu.

Odhiambo has published four novels: diss/ed banded nation in 1998, Kipligat's Chance in 2003, and The Reverend's Apprentice, Volume I in 2008, and Smells like Stars in 2018.
