= Brett Josef Grubisic =

Canadian author, editor, and academic

- Born: 1963 (age 62–63)
- Occupations: author, editor, lecturer

Brett Josef Grubisic (born 1963) is a Canadian author, editor, and was a sessional lecturer of the English language at the University of British Columbia until 2022 when they parted ways.

== Education ==
Grubisic obtained both his bachelor and master degrees from the University of Victoria (B.A., M.A.) and completed his Ph.D. at the University of British Columbia Department of English Language and Literatures with a thesis on Beryl Bainbridge.

== Career ==
Grubisic has edited an anthology of gay male pulp fiction, which is a collection of stories that represent lives outside the urban middle-class mainstream. He has also co-edited an anthology of upcoming Canadian writers featuring acclaimed writers such as Annabel Lyon, Steven Heighton, Camilla Gibb, Michael Turner, and Larissa Lai. The anthology aims to redress an absence which the editors claim to have noticed in Canadian literature: sexually frank fiction.

His debut novel, The Age of Cities, was published in 2006 and was a finalist for the City of Vancouver Book Award. Set predominantly in the late 1950s, the novel-within-a-novel traces the uncertain evolution of a librarian as he struggles between two disparate choices, one urban and the other rural. Grubisic's follow-up novel, This Location of Unknown Possibilities, appeared in 2014. Satirizing university campus and film production politics, it recounts the comic but transformative experience of two anti-heroic protagonists, Marta Spëk, an English professor, and Jakob Nugent, a film production manager, as they travel from Vancouver to British Columbia's Okanagan Valley to work on a television biopic about Lady Hester Stanhope. Understanding Beryl Bainbridge, Grubisic's comprehensive study of the British author's fiction, was published in 2008; it examines Bainbridge as a blackly comic novelist as well as a writer of historiographic metafiction.

He has written about films, books, and writers for the Toronto Star, the Literary Review of Canada, the National Post, the Vancouver Sun, The Globe and Mail, the Maclean's, the British Columbia Review, Quill and Quire and Xtra!.

In 2015, he was a jury member for the Dayne Ogilvie Prize, when Alex Leslie was selected as that year's winner.

== Bibliography ==
=== Non-fiction ===
- Understanding Beryl Bainbridge (University of South Carolina Press, 2008)
- American Hunks: The Muscular Male Body in Popular Culture, 1860–1970 (Arsenal Pulp, 2009)
- National Plots: Historical Fiction and Changing Ideas of Canada (Wilfrid Laurier University Press, 2010)
- Blast, Corrupt, Dismantle, Erase: Contemporary North American Dystopian Literature (Wilfrid Laurier University Press, 2014)

=== Fiction ===
- The Age of Cities (Arsenal Pulp Press, 2006)
- This Location of Unknown Possibilities (Now or Never Press, 2014)
- From Up River and For One Night Only (Now or Never Press, 2016)
- Oldness; Or, the Last-Ditch Efforts of Marcus O (Now or Never Press, 2018)
- My Two-Faced Luck (Now or Never Publishing, 2021)

=== Anthologies ===
- Contra/Diction: New Gay Male Fiction. (Arsenal Pulp, 1998)
- Carnal Nation: Brave New Sex Fictions (Arsenal Pulp, 2000), edited with Carellin Brooks
