= Shannon Webb-Campbell =

Canadian writer, poet and editor

- Born: Canada
- Occupations: Writer; poet; editor
- Writing career
- Notable works: Still No Word (2015); Who Took My Sister? (2018); I Am a Body of Land (2019); Lunar Tides (2022)
- Notable awards: Egale Canada Out in Print Literary Award (2014)

Shannon Webb-Campbell is Canadian writer, poet and editor. She is descended from Miꞌkmaq people from the Qalipu First Nation in Newfoundland.

== Writing career ==
In December 2013, Webb-Campbell was chosen to be the 2014 Canadian Women in Literary Arts (CWILA) critic-in-residence. As part of her residency, she published interviews and reviews in the National Post, the Telegraph-Journal, The Coast and Plenitude.

Her first book, Still No Word, was published by Breakwater Books in 2015. The collection of poetry explores identity, wounding and healing. The publication of the book was part of the Egale Canada Out in Print Literary Award, which Webb-Campbell had won in 2014. The award provides "financial and publishing support to an emerging queer and/or trans-spectrum, female-identified writer in Canada."

In August 2025, Webb-Campbell started working at Lakehead University as an assistant professor of English.

=== Who Took My Sister? controversy ===
In 2018, Webb-Campbell published her second collection of poetry, titled Who Took my Sister?, focusing on Missing and Murdered Indigenous Women. The family of Loretta Saunders, one of the women whose murder Webb-Campbell describes in a poem, spoke out against the book and revealed that Webb-Campbell did not seek their permission prior to publication. It then emerged that Webb-Campbell had not spoken to any of the families of those who were depicted in her book. In response, Book*hug, her publisher, withdrew the book from sale, halted distribution and donated revenue from the book to the Loretta Saunders Community Scholarship Fund.

Webb-Campbell wrote letters of apology to each of the families and, in collaboration with Lee Maracle, reworked the book, eventually publishing it as I Am a Body of Land in 2019. The new book studies the relationship between individual and collective trauma, and bears little resemblance to the withdrawn work. Reviewing the book for Arc Poetry Magazine, Kathy Mac describes Webb-Campbell "[grappling] with the collapse of both her social life and her sense of self" and notes that there is a "deliberate awkwardness" reflecting the alienation she feels. Poet T. Liem, writing in the Montreal Review of Books, praised Webb-Campbell's use of the "energy of repetition to build layers of meaning." I Am a Body of Land was a finalist for the 2019 Quebec Writers' Federation A.M. Klein Prize for Poetry.

== Works ==
- Still No Word. Breakwater. 2015. ISBN 9781550815887.
- Who Took my Sister?. Book*hug. 2018. ISBN 9781771663984.
- I Am a Body of Land. Book*hug. 2019. ISBN 9781771664776.
- Lunar Tides. Book*hug. 2022. ISBN 9781771667388.
- Re: Wild Her. Book*hug. 2025. ISBN 9781771669337.
