= Elizabeth Ruth =

Canadian novelist

- Born: 1968 (age 56–57); Windsor, Ontario, Canada

Elizabeth Ruth (born 1968) is a Canadian novelist.

== Early life and education ==
Elizabeth Ruth was born in Windsor, Ontario, was raised by a single, unmarried mother, and moved frequently while growing up, including living in Detroit, Michigan, in Canada, and in Bogota, Colombia. Those early years shaped her, she says, and offered the best informal education one could have in resourcefulness, survival, and love. Formally, she earned an Honours BA in English Literature and Women's Studies (University of Toronto) an MA in Counselling Psychology [University of Toronto] and an MFA in Creative Writing (University of Guelph).

== Career ==
Before becoming a published writer, Elizabeth Ruth worked for over a decade in the field of front line mental health and in homeless shelters with women and children.

Her debut novel, Ten Good Seconds of Silence, was nominated for the Rogers Writers' Trust Fiction Prize, the Books in Canada First Novel Award and the City of Toronto Book Award in 2001. Her second novel, Smoke, was published in 2005 and later chosen as the winner of the One Book One Community Program. (Waterloo, Ontario region). Both novels are published by Random House in Germany. In 2013 Elizabeth Ruth published a third novel, Matadora, to critical acclaim. Her fourth novel, Semi-Detached is forthcoming in 2023.

Elizabeth edited the anthology, Bent On Writing: Contemporary Queer Tales, based on work by LGBTQ2+ writers presented at her long-running reading series. She published a GoodReads novella in plain language for adult literacy learners, entitled, Love You To Death.

Elizabeth Ruth is well known for her mentorship of aspiring writers through the Humber School for Writers’ Correspondence Program, Diaspora Dialogues, Writers in Electronic Residence, and various writer-in-residencies. She is a favourite at bookclubs, libraries, author events.

Openly lesbian, Ruth also curated a monthly reading series for five years, "Clit Lit", for Canadian LGBTQ+ writers in Toronto.

In 2019 Elizabeth was chosen to be the Berton House writer-in-residence in Dawson City, Yukon. She has served in the role of writer-in-residence at numerous public libraries and with various organizations. Ruth is a member of the Writer's Union of Canada, and served on the author's advisory committee of the Writers' Trust of Canada for many years.

== Works ==
=== Fiction ===
- Semi-Detached (2023)
- Ten Good Seconds of Silence (2001)
- Smoke (2005)
- Matadora (2013)
- Love You to Death (2013) - a novella in plain language for literacy learners

=== Anthologies ===
- Bent on Writing: Contemporary Queer Tales (2002, ed.)
