= Suzette Mayr =

Canadian novelist (born 1967)

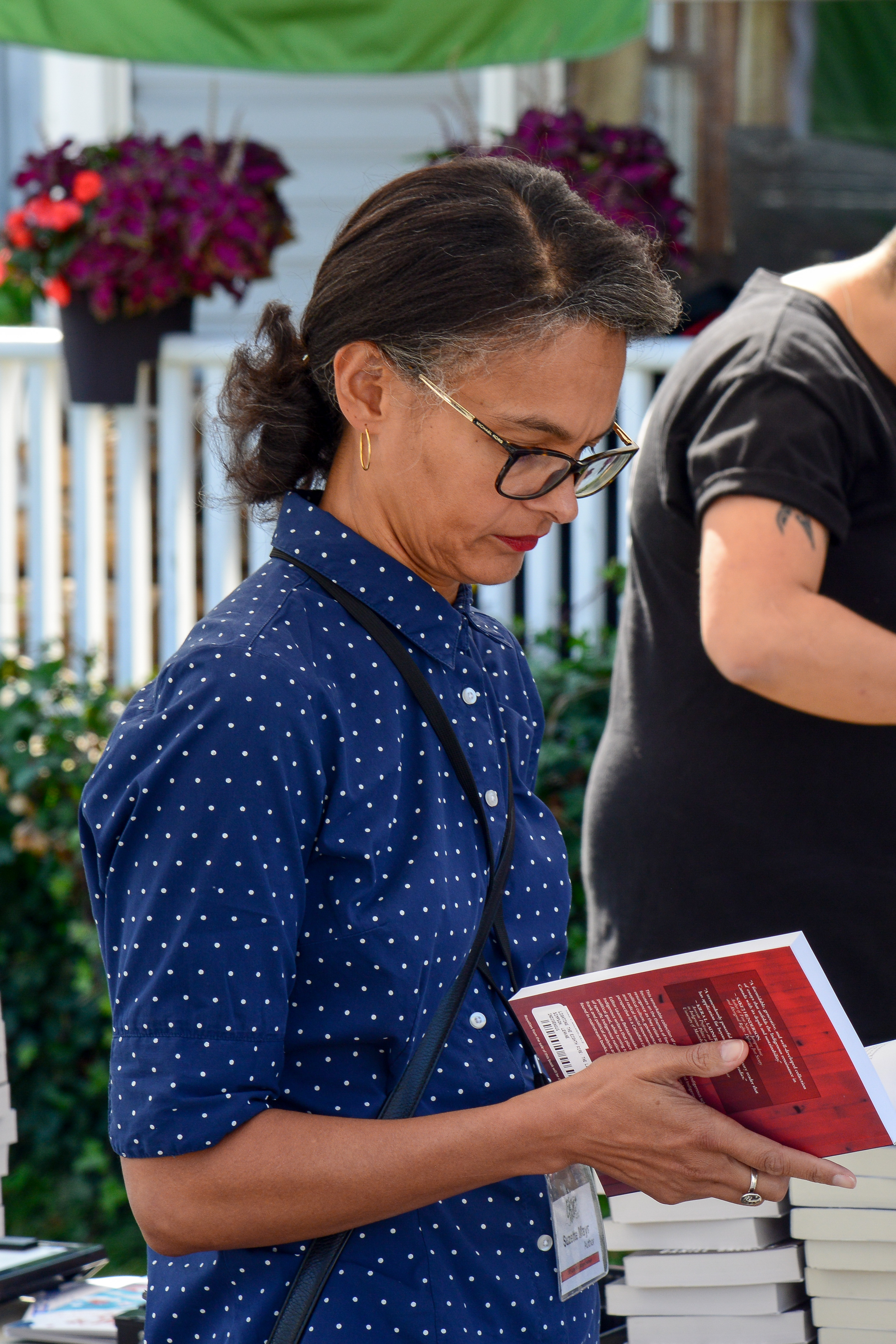
- Mayr at the Eden Mills Writers' Festival in 2017
- Born: 1967 (age 58–59); Calgary, Alberta, Canada
- Education: University of Calgary (BA in English); University of Alberta (MA in creative writing); University of New South Wales (PhD)
- Occupations: Novelist; poet; professor
- Writing career
- Language: English
- Period: 1991–present
- Notable works: Monoceros; The Sleeping Car Porter
- Notable awards: ReLit Award (2012); Giller Prize (2022)

Suzette Mayr is a Canadian novelist who has written six critically acclaimed novels and is currently a professor at the University of Calgary's Faculty of Arts. Mayr's works have won and been nominated for several literary awards.

== Biography ==
Suzette Mayr was born in Calgary, Alberta. Originally planning to study science in her post-secondary career, Mayr changed focus due to her strong performance in English. A creative writing course at the University of Calgary led to her decision to pursue a writing career. She graduated with a bachelor's degree in English. Following her graduation from the University of Calgary, Mayr went on to acquire a Master of Arts in Creative Writing from the University of Alberta and a PhD from the University of New South Wales.

Mayr worked as a waitress and sandwich maker before establishing herself as a professional writer. In addition to her six novels (Moon Honey, The Widows, Venous Hum, Monoceros, Dr. Edith Vane and the Hares of Crawley Hall, and The Sleeping Car Porter), Mayr has published books of poetry and co-edited a literary anthology. Her novels and other literary works have been nominated for several awards. In 2002, Mayr participated in the Calgary Distinguished Writers Program at the University of Calgary, where she is now a professor in the Department of English and teaches courses on creative writing and contemporary literature studies. Mayr is of German and Afro-Caribbean descent and often explores issues of race, identity, and sex in her writing through the stylistic use of humour, cultural mythologies, and surreal imagery.

Mayr is a past president of the Writers' Guild of Alberta. In 2010, she served on the jury for the Dayne Ogilvie Prize for LGBTQ Emerging Writers, selecting Nancy Jo Cullen as that year's prize winner.

=== The Sleeping Car Porter (2022) ===
The Sleeping Car Porter, published in 2022, centres on R.T. Baxter, a closeted gay Black Canadian man working as a porter on a cross-Canada railway. Publishers Weekly named it one of the best works of fiction published in 2022.

== Awards and honours ==
=== Wins ===
- 1992 – Ted and Charlotte Davenport Prize for Poetry, University of Alberta.
- 2011 – City of Calgary W.O. Mitchell Book Prize for Monoceros, presented in 2012.
- 2012 – ReLit Award in the novel category for Monoceros.
- 2022 – Giller Prize for The Sleeping Car Porter.
- 2023 – Georges Bugnet Award for Fiction (Alberta Literary Awards) for The Sleeping Car Porter.
- 2023 – City of Calgary W.O. Mitchell Book Prize for The Sleeping Car Porter.

=== Shortlists ===
- 1996 – Georges Bugnet Award for Best Novel and Henry Kreisel Award for Best First Book (Alberta Literary Awards) for Moon Honey.
- 1998 – Commonwealth Writers' Prize for Best Book (Canada and the Caribbean) for The Widows.
- 2012 – Ferro-Grumley Award for LGBTQ Fiction for Monoceros.
- 2012 – Georges Bugnet Award for Fiction for Monoceros.
- 2016 – Co-finalist for Best Essay at the Alberta Magazine Publishers Awards.
- 2018 – Georges Bugnet Award for Fiction for Dr. Edith Vane and the Hares of Crawley Hall.
- 2022 – Republic of Consciousness Prize (United States and Canada) for The Sleeping Car Porter.
- 2023 – Inaugural Carol Shields Prize for Fiction for The Sleeping Car Porter.
- 2023 – Governor General's Award for English-language fiction for The Sleeping Car Porter.
- 2024 – Dublin Literary Award for The Sleeping Car Porter.

=== Longlists ===
- 2005 – ReLit Award for Venous Hum.
- 2011 – Giller Prize for Monoceros.

=== Academic honours ===
- 2011 – Faculty of Arts Distinguished Research Award, University of Calgary.
- 2023 – Killam Annual Professor Award, University of Calgary.
- 2024 – Elected a Fellow of the Royal Society of Canada.
- 2025 – Killam Graduate Supervision and Mentorship Award, University of Calgary.

== Works ==
=== Novels ===
- Moon Honey (1995)
- The Widows (1998)
- Venous Hum (2004)
- Monoceros (2011)
- Dr. Edith Vane and the Hares of Crawley Hall (2017)
- The Sleeping Car Porter (2022)

=== Poetry ===
- Zebra Talk (1991)
- Tale (2001)

=== Anthologized works ===
- "Scalps", in Boundless Alberta (1993)
- "Glass Anatomy", in Eye Wuz Here (1996)
- "Toot Suite Matricia", in Threshold (1999) and So Long Been Dreaming (2004)
- "Nipple Gospel", in And Other Stories (2001)
