= Alex Leslie =

Canadian writer

- Born: Vancouver
- Occupation: short story writer
- Writing career
- Period: 2000s–present
- Notable works: People Who Disappear, The Things I Heard About You
- Website: alexleslie.wordpress.com

Alex Leslie is a Canadian writer, who won the Dayne Ogilvie Prize for LGBT writers from the Writers Trust of Canada in 2015. Leslie's work has won a National Magazine Award, the CBC Literary Award for fiction, the Western Canadian Jewish Book Award and has been shortlisted for the BC Book Prize for fiction (the Ethel Wilson Prize) and the Kobzar Prize for contributions to Ukrainian Canadian culture.

Leslie's fourth book, a collection of poems, Vancouver for Beginners, was published by BookThug in Fall 2019. Leslie's third book, a collection of short stories, We All Need to Eat, was published by BookThug in Fall 2018. Leslie's debut short story collection People Who Disappear was published in 2012, and was a shortlisted nominee for the Lambda Literary Award for Debut Fiction and the ReLit Award for Short Stories in 2013. Leslie's prose poetry collection, The Things I Heard About You, was published in 2014 and was a finalist for the Robert Kroetsch Award. Leslie was included in Granta's first Canadian literature feature issue in 2018 and in Best Canadian Stories 2020 (Biblioasis). Leslie's writing has also appeared in the anthologies Journey Prize 2016 (Penguin Random House), Best Canadian Poetry in English 2014 (Tightrope), 09: Coming Attractions (Oberon), The Enpipe Line and Friend. Follow. Text. #stories from living online, and in the magazine Plenitude.

== Writing ==
=== Books ===
- Vancouver for Beginners (2019)
- We All Need to Eat (2018)
- The Things I Heard about You (2014)
- People Who Disappear (2012)

=== Other works ===
- Phoenix featured in Best Canadian Stories (2020)
- Eagle Son (2019)
- The Person You Want to See (2015)
- The Living On This Beach (2011)

== Awards ==
Leslie's writing has won numerous awards, Vancouver for Beginners was a finalist for the 2021/2021 City of Vancouver Book Award, as well as the winner of the 2020 Lohn Foundation Prize for Poetry, from Western Canada Jewish Book Awards. Leslie's We All Need to Eat was a finalist for three awards; the Nancy Richler Memorial Prize for Fiction in the 2020 Western Canada Jewish Book Awards, the 2020 Kobzar Book Award, and the 2019 Ethel Wilson Fiction Award. Leslie's short story collection from 2012, People Who Disappear, was shortlisted for a Lambda Award for debut fiction. In addition, Leslie won the 2015 Dayne Ogilvie Prize for LGBT writers from the Writers Trust of Canada.
