= Tongzhi literature =

Taiwanese LGBTQ literature

Tongzhi literature (Chinese: 同志文學; pinyin: Tóngzhì wénxué) is a form of LGBT literature originating in Taiwan, with influences from mainland China, Hong Kong, and Chinese-speaking diaspora communities in countries such as Malaysia. Tongzhi is a term that formerly carried political connotations, but now is used among younger generations to refer to LGBT or queer people.

The form tends to focus on the struggles experienced by sexual minorities, rather than interpersonal romantic relationships. Prominent authors of tongzhi literature include Andre Aciman, Chi Ta-wei, Kevin Chen, Qiu Miaojin, Yukio Mishima, and Chu T’ien-wen. Examples of works in the genre include Chi Ta-wei's 1996 novel The Membranes and Kevin Chen's 2019 novel Ghost Town.

== History ==
The genre emerged in the 1990s and the decade is called the "golden age" of tongzhi literature. However, there are works published before the 1990s that are considered part of or influences of the genre, such as Pai Hsien-yung's 1960 novella Jade Love (novella), his 1976 short story collection Lonely Seventeen, his 1983 short story A Sky Full of Bright, Twinkling Stars, and his 1983 novel Crystal Boys.

In 1998, the Global Chinese Tongzhi Literature Prize was established.

Tongzhi literature was also posted and shared on the internet starting in the 1990s.
