= A Touch of Green =

- Poster
- Chinese: 一把青
- Hanyu Pinyin: Yī Bǎ Qīng
- Genre: Historical drama
- Based on: Taipei People by Pai Hsien-yung
- Written by: Huang Shih-ming
- Directed by: Tsao Jui-yuan
- Starring: Tien Hsin; Cheryl Yang; Cindy Yu-han Lien; Gaby Chun-tian Lan; Weber Yang; Wu Kang-ren; Fan Kuang-yao; Ban Tie-hsiang; Hans Chung; Wen Chen-ling; Toby Lee
- Opening theme: "As It Is" (看淡) by Hebe Tien
- Ending theme: "Men Over Clouds, Women on Earth" (天上的男人，地上的女人) by Yoga Lin
- Country of origin: Taiwan
- Original language: Mandarin
- No. of episodes: 31

Production
- Production locations: Taiwan; Nanking, Shanghai, China
- Cinematography: Han Chi-hsuan
- Editor: Tu Min-Chi
- Running time: 47–84 minutes (approx.)
- Production companies: Taipei Film Co, Ltd (台北創造電影有限公司)

Original release
- Network: PTS
- Release: 19 December 2015 – 2 April 2016

A Touch of Green (Chinese: 一把青) is a 2015 Taiwanese period drama television series produced by Public Television Service, based on the 1971 short story of the same name by Pai Hsien-yung (which was included in his bilingual collection Taipei People). The story follows a group of Republic of China Air Force pilots and their wives during the Chinese Communist Revolution (1945–49) in mainland China and the White Terror period (1949–87) in Taiwan.

A Touch of Green won 6 awards at the 2016 Golden Bell Awards, including Best TV Series, Best Directing (Tsao Jui-yuan), and Best Actor (Wu Kang-jen).

== Plot ==
The story takes place from 1945 to 1981, after the Japanese surrender from World War II and the Chinese Civil War. The story focuses on three women, from their days as schoolgirls to their marriages as wives of Republic of China Air Force pilots. They follow their husbands from Nanking to Taiwan in 1949 after the retreat of the Government of the Republic of China (ROC) and Kuomintang (KMT). The story emphasizes the daily lives of the families who stayed at the military dependents' village, experiencing the pain of leaving their home and separations from friends/family. Their shared experience brings the military families together in support of one another. Through their love and bond, they survive hardships. The resulting story is motivational and touching.

The story includes:

- 1945－1949, Episodes 1－20, Second Sino-Japanese War, Chinese Communist Revolution (Student activism in Nanking 1946 and Liaoshen Campaign)
- 1954－1981, Episodes 21－31, Chinese Communist Revolution, White Terror (Taiwan), Black Bat Squadron, Black Cat Squadron

== Cast ==
- Cheryl Yang as Qin Qian-yi
- Tien Hsin as Zhou Wei-xun
- Weber Yang as Jiang Wei Cheng
- Gaby Chun-tian Lan as Shao Zhi-jian
- Wu Kang-ren as Guo Zhen
- Cindy Yu-han Lien as Zhu Qing
- Wen Chen-ling as Shao Mo-ting
  - Zhuang Xin-yu as young Shao Mo-ing
- Hans Chung as Gu Zhao-jun
- Fan Kuang-yao as Fan Ren-xian
- Ban Tie-hsiang as Mr. Gong
- Li Shao-jie as Wang Ying
- Shih Ming-shuai as Wang Gang
- Huang Shang-ho as Mr. Han, Lieutenant of 9th Brigade

== Broadcast information ==
Channel	Place	Date	Time
PTS	Taiwan	19 December 2015	Saturday 21:00-23:00
Line TV	Taiwan	19 December 2015	Saturday 21:00
Star Entertainment Channel	Taiwan	8 May 2016	Sunday 22:00-24:00
Star Chinese Channel	Taiwan	16 July 2016	Saturday 22:00-24:00
Astro Shuang Xing	Malaysia	4 May 2016	Monday to Friday 16:00-17:00
Talentvision	Canada	29 July 2016	Western Time Zone Monday to Friday 6:30PM and 12:30AM; Eastern Time Zone Monday to Friday 9:30PM and 3:30AM

== Awards and nominations ==
Year	Ceremony	Category	Nominee	Result
2016	51st Golden Bell Awards	Best Television Series	A Touch of Green	Won
2016	51st Golden Bell Awards	Best Leading Actor in a Television Series	Wu Kang-ren	Won
2016	51st Golden Bell Awards	Best Leading Actress in a Television Series	Cindy Yu-han Lien	Nominated
2016	51st Golden Bell Awards	Best Leading Actress in a Television Series	Cheryl Yang	Nominated
2016	51st Golden Bell Awards	Best Supporting Actress in a Television Series	Tien-hsin	Nominated
2016	51st Golden Bell Awards	Best Newcomer in a Television Series	Cindy Yu-han Lien	Won
2016	51st Golden Bell Awards	Best Directing for a Television Series	Tsao Jui-yuan	Won
2016	51st Golden Bell Awards	Best Screenplay for a Television Series	Huang Shih-ming	Nominated
2016	51st Golden Bell Awards	Best Cinematography	Han Chi-hsuan	Nominated
2016	51st Golden Bell Awards	Best Film Editing	Tu Min-chi	Nominated
2016	51st Golden Bell Awards	Best Sound Award	Chen Hsiao-hsia, Zhang Yi, Wu Bai-chun, Huang Da-wei, Lin Chuan-zhi, Chen Jie-han	Nominated
2016	51st Golden Bell Awards	Best Lighting Award	Ting Hai-te	Won
2016	51st Golden Bell Awards	Best Art and Design Award	Hui Ying-kwong, Yao Jun, Xu Shu-hua, Yan Zhen-qin	Won
2016	21st Asian Television Awards	Best Actress in a Leading Role	Cheryl Yang	Won
2016	21st Asian Television Awards	Best Actor in a Supporting Role	Gaby Chun-tian Lan	Nominated
2016	21st Asian Television Awards	Best Actress in a Supporting Role	Tien-hsin	Won
2016	21st Asian Television Awards	Best Direction (Fiction)	Tsao Jui-yuan	Won
2016	21st Asian Television Awards	Best Original Screenplay	Huang Shih-ming	Won
2016	21st Asian Television Awards	Best Theme Song	"As It Is" - Chen Hsiao-hsia	Won
