= Taipei People =

1971 Short story collection by Pai Hsien-yung

- Author: Pai Hsien-yung
- Original title: 台北人
- Working title: Wandering in the Garden, Waking from a Dream: Tales of Taipei Characters
- Translator: Patia Yasin
- Language: Chinese
- Genre: Fiction
- Set in: Taipei, Taiwan
- Publisher: Chinese ed.: Ch'en Chung (1971); Er Ya (1982); GXNU Press (2010) English ed.: Indiana University Press (1982); CUHK Press (2018) Bilingual ed.: CUHK Press (2000)
- Publication date: April 1, 1971
- ISBN: 978-9-622-01859-4 (2000)
- OCLC: 1078757601
- Dewey Decimal: 895.1352

Taipei People (simplified Chinese: 台北人; traditional Chinese: 臺北人; Tongyong Pinyin: Táiběi rén; Wade–Giles: Taipei jen) is a short story collection by Taiwanese-American writer Pai Hsien-yung published in 1971. Comprising 14 short stories written in the latter half of the 1960s while teaching Chinese literature at the University of California, Santa Barbara, it describes struggles of immigrants to Taiwan in the 1950s upon the Kuomintang's retreat starting in 1949.

The book was first published by Pai's own Ch'en Chung (Morning Bell) Publishing Co. in Taiwan in 1971, with reprints from Er Ya Publishing Co. in 1997 and 2002. Between 1976 and 1981, Pai and Patia Yasin co-translated Taipei People into English with editing by George Kao; it was first published in 1982. Considered one of the most important works of modern Chinese literature, it ranked number 7 on Yazhou Zhoukan's Top 100 Chinese Fictions of the Twentieth Century.

== Context ==
Taipei People's short stories are based in Taipei, which became the seat of Kuomintang government after their defeat in the Chinese Civil War. It reflects the experience of people who fled from Mainland China, often called waishengren, during the Kuomintang retreat, therefore often containing military elements.

As the son of Kuomintang general Pai Chung-hsi, Pai Hsien-yung lived in Chongqing, Shanghai, Nanjing, and Hong Kong before relocating to Taipei in 1952. There, he attended National Taiwan University to study English literature, and was a founder for the bimonthly literature journal Xiandai Wenxue.

== Structure and Format ==
The stories in Taipei People vary in length and writing style, all focusing on characters and their lives after leaving China for Taiwan in the 1950s. The collection includes 14 stories: "The Eternal Snow Beauty" (永遠的尹雪豔), "A Touch of Green" (一把青), "New Year's Eve" (歲除), "The Last Night of Taipan Chin" (金大班的最後一夜), "A Sea of Blood-red Azaleas" (那片血一般紅的杜鵑花), "Ode to Bygone Days" (思舊賦), "The Dirge of Liang Fu" (梁父吟), "Love’s Lone Flower" (孤戀花), "Glory’s by Blossom Bridge" (花橋榮記), "Autumn Reveries" (秋思), "A Sky Full of Bright, Twinkling Stars" (滿天裏亮晶晶的星星), "Wandering in the Garden, Waking from a Dream" (遊園驚夢), "Winter Night" (冬夜), and "State Funeral" (國葬). Some of these stories were previously included in the 1967 collection The Banished Immortals (謫仙記) published by Wen Hsing Bookstore (文星書局).

The format and topic of this book is often compared to James Joyce's "Dubliners". Both of the books are short story series, and they are all about people in a certain city. Also, another book of Pai Hsien-yung called "New Yorkers" are similar to the two books.

== Themes ==
Although these people are called "Taipei People", they are always reminiscing the scintillating old times in Mainland China, therefore most of them don't belong to Taipei mentally. The book is depicting loss and their sense of insecurity.

== Motifs ==
The stories are interwoven with a large number of motifs that are very suggestive of the place, the time, and the people. Some of them include dance halls, teahouses, taxi dancer, and (sexual) patronage; mahjong; the Kuomintang military, especially the officer corps; China's diverse regions; fashion, especially the chipao (qipao); traditional Chinese interior furnishings; Buddhism; Peking opera; separation; and many others.

== Receptions ==
Fu Li-chung (符立中) regards the narrative technique of this book as following James Joyce's Dubliners and considers it a classic in contemporary Chinese fiction. Harvard professor Patrick Hanan praises the book as the "highest achievement in contemporary Chinese short stories". Apart from its literary significance, various themes explored in the book have accumulated substantial research. For example, "The Eternal Snow Beauty" has been discussed in the context of theories of misogyny, and studies have delved into the spatial imagery and contemporary leisure and entertainment in Taipei.

== Related works ==
The collection has been translated into English and other languages. The stories have been also reworked to dramas in Hong Kong and Taiwan, and a movie in Taiwan.

== Short stories synopses ==
"Taipei People" consists of fourteen stories:

- The Eternal Snow Beauty (永遠的尹雪豔)
- A Touch of Green (一把青)
- New Year's Eve (歲除)
- The Last Night of Taipan Chin (金大班的最後一夜)
- A Sea of Blood-red Azaleas (那片血一般紅的杜鵑花)
- Ode to Bygone Days (思舊賦)
- The Dirge of Liang Fu (梁父吟)
- Love's Lone Flower (孤戀花)
- Glory's by Blossom Bridge (花橋榮記)
- Autumn Reveries (秋思)
- A Sky Full of Bright, Twinkling Stars (滿天裏亮晶晶的星星)
- Wandering in the Garden, Waking from a Dream (遊園驚夢)
- Winter Night (冬夜)
- State Funeral (國葬)

Brief synopses are provided below. (Based on the English translation by the author and Patia Yasin, published as "Wandering in the Garden, Waking from a Dream.")

=== The Eternal Snow Beauty (永遠的尹雪豔) ===
The aging "Snow Beauty" (Yin Hsueh-yen) looks back on her days as the belle of Shanghai's Paramount ballroom; she is still the center of attention at upscale mahjong soirees she arranges at her Taipei home.

=== A Touch of Green (一把青) ===
In an extended tale, the (female) narrator observes how an innocent middle school bride (Verdancy Chu) transcends the death of her air force pilot husband during the war years to attain some degree of stability in the post-war Taiwan environment.

The story touches on the KMT-related New Life Movement as an element of continuity in the social life of mainland loyalists in the pre- and post-war eras.

=== New Year's Eve (歲除) ===
A visit by a former commanding officer (Brother Lai) for some New Year's Eve dining and drinking provides a contrast between the heroic tales of past military exploits and the limitations of his current situation.

An important "character" in the story is the fiery Kaoliang wine, famous in Taiwan for its power.

=== The Last Night of Taipan Chin (金大班的最後一夜) ===
"Taipan Chin" is actually a woman who commands a taxi dancer group. In the story, she reflects on her choices, especially the insurmountable contradictions between wealth/security vs. love vs. freedom.

=== A Sea of Blood-red Azaleas (那片血一般紅的杜鵑花) ===
A servant, Wang Hsiung, epitomizes the torment of exile. The story is pervaded with "fish out of water" symbolism.

The story leans heavily on the use of the azalea as a symbol of homesickness and exile in Chinese culture.

=== Ode to Bygone Days (思舊賦) ===
Two old servants meet and talk about all the changes around them, especially those occurring in the rich family they have served. The story views decay as seen from beneath.

The story falls in a genre that explores the equivalence of the "mansion" and the "family," and the interweaving threads in their parallel growth and decline, in (modern) Chinese literature. See, for instance, Ba Jin's Family and the classic of late imperial Chinese literature, Dream of the Red Chamber.

=== The Dirge of Liang Fu (梁父吟) ===
On the occasion of the funeral of a general, one of his cohorts recounts past exploits. The story conveys the utter resolution of substantial elements of the elite mainlander class to "recover the Mainland," even as age and distance render their desires impossible.

The story includes a recounting of events connected to the Wuchang Uprising, the first event in the 1911 Revolution that gave birth to the Republic of China.

"The Dirge of Liang Fu" refers to specific compositions in classic Chinese literature, and suggests the way in which exile and return have been the subject of Chinese poets such as Tu Fu.

=== Love's Lone Flower (孤戀花) ===
"Peach Blossom" is the protégé and companion of the female protagonist; both are club escorts. Peach Blossom becomes falls into a deadly and insanity-creating spiral with a thug, Yama.

The context of the story is yet another variant of the Chinese "pleasure quarters," the winehouse.

=== Glory's by Blossom Bridge (花橋榮記) ===
"Glory's" is a restaurant, and the noodles it serves could stand as a tenuous link between distant Kweilin—the site of its predecessor—and Taiwan.

All of the stories in the collection make use of allusions to particular regions in mainland China; this story's allusion to Kweilin is special, since that is the author's home province, Kweilin (Guilin). Through references to food, landscape, and the unique Kweilin opera, he suggests the particular poignancy of exile from that place.

=== Autumn Reveries (秋思) ===
Autumn means "aging," and this jewel of a story focuses on the power and fragility of beauty.

The story alludes to the use of the chrysanthemum as a symbol of the transience of life—its brilliant, brief flowering followed by excruciating decline—in Chinese (and Japanese) culture.

=== A Sky Full of Bright, Twinkling Stars (滿天裏亮晶晶的星星) ===
this story follows street characters who frequent Taipei's New Park, including The Guru, Ah Hsiung the Primitive, Dark-and-Handsome, Little Jade, and concludes with a symbol of how very different people are thrown into each other's arms.

This story alludes to the bright effluorescence of the Shanghai film industry in the '20s and '30s.

=== Wandering in the Garden, Waking from a Dream (遊園驚夢) ===
The collection's eponymous story is a tour-de-force of Chinese cultural allusion, as it contrasts the pre-Taiwan condition of a group of Kun Opera singers (Fragrant Cassia, Heavenly Pepper, Red Red Rose) with their current position as wives (or ex-wives or widows) of prominent society figures (Madan Ch'ien . . . Madam Tou . . . Madam Jen . . . . ).

The story interweaves abundant allusion to a specific variety of Chinese opera called Kunqu in general, including its many roles and unique sounds, together with a specific episode from the opera The Peony Pavilion ("Wandering in the Garden, Waking from a Dream"). Moreover, these are interwoven with allusions to the dashing and machismo of the Kuomintang officer corps and a whole host of allusions to the sensuous pleasures of elite Chinese societies - the shimmer of silk cheongsam, the smell of high quality rosewood Chinese furniture, the taste of dishes from Chinese cuisine specially selected for the event.

Kunqu is itself native to the area near Nanjing and Suzhou in China, in other words, it refers to the seat of Kuomintang government and support prior to exile in Taiwan. The story alludes to specific dishes of the Huaiyang cuisine, another reminder of the Nanjing area.

=== Winter Night (冬夜) ===
In the tale, two professors talk about their careers, and the contrast between their glorious and idealistic student days—particularly their role in the student demonstrations that ushered in the May Fourth Movement—and the feelings of failure, hypocrisy, and desertion that they currently battle.

=== State Funeral (國葬) ===
This story takes a none-too-subtle parting shot at the Mainlander ethos. At a state funeral for an important general such as his father, the general's old aide is bewildered to confront the old and feeble men who once constituted China's "Steel Army" and "Iron Forces." The only connection to the old Mainland idea seems to be the long line of black limousines, "like a serpent," in the funeral procession.

This story, written about 7 years before the death of Chiang Kai-shek seems to foretell the inevitable consequences of the natural death of the KMT's military leaders.

== Bibliography ==
- Taipei People. Translated by Pai Hsien-yung; Patia Yasin. Vintage Classics. May 2026. ISBN 978-152-995-150-9.
- 臺北人 (in Chinese). Elite Books. 2002. ISBN 978-957-639-332-7.
- George Kao, ed. (July 2000). Taipei People. Translated by Pai Hsien-yung; Yeh Pei-Shia (bilingual ed.). The Chinese University of Hong Kong Press. ISBN 978-962-201-859-4.
- George Kao, ed. (1982). Wandering in the Garden, Waking from a Dream: Tales of Taipei Characters. Translated by Pai Hsien-yung; Patia Yasin. Indiana University Press. ISBN 0-253-19981-6.

=== Stories ===
1. "The Eternal Yin Hsueh-yen". Renditions (5). Translated by Katherine Carlitz; Anthony C. Yu: 89–97. Autumn 1975.; also published as "The Eternal Snow Beauty"; working manuscript in English, translated by Pai Hsien-yung and Patia Yasin; from the Pai Hsien-Yung collection at the Alexandria Digital Research Library, University of California, Santa Barbara
2. "A Touch of Green"; working manuscript in English, translated by Pai Hsien-yung and Patia Yasin; from the Pai Hsien-Yung collection at the Alexandria Digital Research Library, University of California, Santa Barbara
3. "New Year's Eve". Renditions (5). Translated by Diana Grant: 98–117. Autumn 1975.; working manuscript in English, translated by Diana Granat; original holographic manuscript in Chinese; from the Pai Hsien-Yung collection at the Alexandria Digital Research Library, University of California, Santa Barbara
4. "Miss Chin's Farewell Night". Stone Lion Review (2). Translated by Stephen Cheng: 63–72. 1978.; also published as "The Final Night of Taipan Ch'in"; working manuscript in English, translated by Pai Hsien-yung and Patia Yasin;original holographic manuscript in Chinese; from the Pai Hsien-Yung collection at the Alexandria Digital Research Library, University of California, Santa Barbara
5. "A Sea of Blood-red Azaleas"; original holographic manuscript in Chinese; from the Pai Hsien-Yung collection at the Alexandria Digital Research Library, University of California, Santa Barbara
6. "Ode to Bygone Days"; also published as "Lamentations for Bygone Days"; working manuscript in English, translated by Pai Hsien-yung and Patia Yasin; original holographic manuscript in Chinese; from the Pai Hsien-Yung collection at the Alexandria Digital Research Library, University of California, Santa Barbara
7. "The Dirge of Liang Fu"; working manuscript in English, translated by Pai Hsien-yung and Patia Yasin; original holographic manuscript in Chinese; from the Pai Hsien-Yung collection at the Alexandria Digital Research Library, University of California, Santa Barbara
8. "Love's Lone Flower"; also published as "A Lone Amorous Flower"; working manuscript in English, translated by Pai Hsien-yung and Patia Yasin; original holographic manuscript (version 0) in Chinese; original holographic manuscript (version 1) in Chinese; original holographic manuscript (version 2) in Chinese; original holographic manuscript (version 3) in Chinese; from the Pai Hsien-Yung collection at the Alexandria Digital Research Library, University of California, Santa Barbara
9. Chi Pang-yuan; John J. Deeney; Ho Hsin; Wu Hsi-chen; Yu Kwang-chung, eds. (1975). "Jung's by the Blossom Bridge". An Anthology of Contemporary Chinese Literature. Vol. 2: Short Stories. Translated by Chu Limin. Taipei: National Institute for Compilation and Translation. pp. 279–294.; also published as "Glory's by Blossom Bridge"; working manuscript in English, translated by Pai Hsien-yung and William A. Lyell; original holographic manuscript in Chinese; from the Pai Hsien-Yung collection at the Alexandria Digital Research Library, University of California, Santa Barbara
10. "Autumn Reveries"; working manuscript in English, translated by Pai Hsien-yung and Patia Yasin; original holographic manuscript in Chinese; from the Pai Hsien-Yung collection at the Alexandria Digital Research Library, University of California, Santa Barbara
11. "A Sky Full of Blazing Stars"; working manuscript in English, translated by Pai Hsien-yung and Patia Yasin; original holographic manuscript (version 1) in Chinese; original holographic manuscript (version 2) in Chinese; from the Pai Hsien-Yung collection at the Alexandria Digital Research Library, University of California, Santa Barbara
12. "Wandering in the Garden, Waking from a Dream"; working manuscript in English from the Pai Hsien-Yung collection at the Alexandria Digital Research Library, University of California, Santa Barbara
13. Joseph S.M. Lau, ed. (1976). "Winter Nights". Chinese Stories From Taiwan: 1960-1970. Translated by John Kwan-Terry; Stephen Lacey. New York: Columbia University Press. pp. 337–354. ISBN 0-231-04007-5.; previously published as Chi Pang-yuan; John J. Deeney; Ho Hsin; Wu Hsi-chen; Yu Kwang-chung, eds. (1975). "One Winter Evening". An Anthology of Contemporary Chinese Literature. Vol. 2: Short Stories. Translated by Chu Limin. Taipei: National Institute for Compilation and Translation. pp. 261–278.; also published as "Winter Night"; working manuscript in English, translated by Pai Hsien-yung and Patia Yasin; original holographic manuscript in Chinese; from the Pai Hsien-Yung collection at the Alexandria Digital Research Library, University of California, Santa Barbara
14. Pang-yuan Chi; David Der-wei Wang, eds. (2003). "State Funeral". The Last of the Whampoa Breed: Stories of the Chinese Diaspora. Translated by Bai Xianyong; Patia Yasin. New York: Columbia University Press. ISBN 9780231130028.; working manuscript in English, translated by Pai Hsien-yung and Patia Yasin; original holographic manuscript in Chinese; from the Pai Hsien-Yung collection at the Alexandria Digital Research Library, University of California, Santa Barbara
