= Yongjing =

Yongjing can refer to the following places:

- Yongjing County, a county in Linxia Prefecture, Gansu, China
- Yongjing, Changhua, a rural township in Changhua County, Taiwan
- Yongjing (1756-1757), 13th son of Qianlong Emperor and Empress Nara
