= Ouyang Tzu =

Ouyang Tzu 歐陽子
- Born: 洪智惠; Hóng Zhìhuì; 1939 (age 86–87); Hiroshima, Japan
- Education: National Taiwan University
- Occupation: writer
- Relatives: Pai Hsien-yung

Ouyang Tzu (Chinese: 歐陽子; pinyin: Ōuyáng Zǐ; sometimes written as Ou-yang Tzu; born 1939 in Japan) is the penname of Hong Zhihui (洪智惠, Hóng Zhìhuì), a female Taiwanese writer. She, along with fellow students of National Taiwan University Bai Xianyong, Wang Wenxing, and Chen Rouxi, created the literary magazine Modern Literature (Xiandai wenxue) in 1960, under the guidance of Professor Hsia Tsi-an. She attended graduate school in the United States.

Ouyang's short stories are modernist in the sense that they employ novelistic techniques of literary modernism: stream of consciousness, multiple perspective narration, symbolism, probing of psychological depths instead of drawing social canvases. Such techniques flourished briefly in Taiwan during the 1960s and were in response to the socio-political "Recover the Mainland" trend of the 1940s and 1950s.

Ouyang's writing is experimental as well in terms of challenging social mores, especially concerning sex. Her stories are filled with violence, sexuality and abnormal psychology.

Ouyang is also a literary critic. She has produced a book-length study of Taipei People (see Pai Hsien-yung).

== Bibliography (only of works available in English translation) ==
- "Meijung". Translated by Alexander Moosa. The Chinese Pen (Winter, 1979): 68-85.
- "The Net". Translated by the author. In Joseph S. M. Lau, ed., The Unbroken Chain: an anthology of Taiwan fiction since 1926. Bloomington: Indiana UP, 1983, 185-94.
- "Perfect Mother". Translated by Chu Limin. In: Chi Pang-yuan, et al., eds., An Anthology of Contemporary Chinese Literature. Taipei: National Institute for Compilation and Translation, 1975, II, 357-74.
- '"Prodigal Father". Translated by the author. The Chinese Pen (Autumn, 1974): 50-64.
- "Vase". Translated by Chu Limin. In: Chi Pang-yuan, et al., eds., An Anthology of Contemporary Chinese Literature. Taipei: National Institute for Compilation and Translation, 1975, II, 345-56. Also in Ann C. Carver and Sun-sheng Yvonne Chang, eds., Bamboo Shoots After the Rain: contemporary stories by women writers of Taiwan. New York: The Feminist Press, 1990, 103-114.
- "The Wooden Beauty". Translated by Sally Lindfors. The Chinese Pen (Summer, 1984): 74-82.
