= Notes of a Crocodile =

1994 Taiwanese novel by Qiu Miaojin

- Author: Qiu Miaojin
- Original title: 鱷魚手記
- Language: Chinese
- Genre: Taiwanese literature, lesbian literature
- Publication date: 1994

Notes of a Crocodile (Chinese: 鱷魚手記) is a 1994 Taiwanese novel by writer Qiu Miaojin (邱妙津). It is one of the most significant Taiwanese lesbian novels of the 1990s, and is also a significant work in Taiwanese literature. The novel depicts the identity, emotional belonging, and self-exploration of lesbians, and uses the metaphor of a "crocodile" to represent a homosexual who is forced to live in disguise in a society that is dominated by heterosexuals. The terms "crocodile" and "Lazi" (拉子) in the novel have become self-referential terms for lesbians in Taiwan.

== Synopsis ==
Notes of a Crocodile is a collection of eight notebooks, told in a double narrative. Most chapters are written in the first person in the form of private diaries narrated by the college student Lazi, who struggles to connect with others and understand her identity.

The novel is set in Taipei of the late 1980s, post-martial law, detailing Lazi falling in love with her female classmate Shui Ling and befriending many other queer characters, such as the gangster Meng Sheng and the best friends Tun Tun and Zhi Rou. Lazi has a tempestuous relationship with Shui Ling and a brief affair with a coworker named Xiao Fan, who is engaged to a cold and distant fiancé. Through this depiction of love and struggle, and the sincere confession of emotions, the author depicts the psychological predicament of homosexuals in the 1990s, facing their own same-sex love in a society dominated by patriarchy. Some chapters are written in the form of monologues by an anthropomorphized crocodile, which satirize and allude to the lonely and oppressed fate of a "sexual deviant" in human society.

== Reception ==
Taiwanese writer Chi Ta-wei (紀大偉) believes that the two storylines do not mutually define each other in a clear way. In general, it is believed that the crocodile symbolizes a lesbian or homosexual who appears to be friendly and shy on the outside, but lonely on the inside. Literary scholar Tze-Lan Deborah Sang (桑梓蘭) believes that the novel is a blend of realism and animal fables. The author uses montage and jump-cutting techniques to organize the structure, which can be seen as a feature of Notes of a Crocodile. An English translation of the book by Bonnie Huie was published in May of 2017 by the New York Review Books as part of their NYRB Classics series, which The New York Times described as "nothing short of remarkable."
