= Isabel Chan =

- Born: Chan Yat Ling 陳逸寧; 1979 (age 46–47); Malaysia
- Occupations: Actor; financial advisor
- Years active: 1999–2018
- Children: Son: Lo Chun Hei

Chinese name
- Traditional Chinese: 陳逸寧
- Simplified Chinese: 陈逸宁
Transcriptions
Standard Mandarin
- Hanyu Pinyin: Chén Yìníng
Yue: Cantonese
- Jyutping: can4 jat6 ning4
- Musical career
- Also known as: Yat Ling Chan (Cantonese name)
- Genres: Romantic comedy, action films
- Website: Facebook: Isabel Chan

Chan Yat Ling (Chinese: 陳逸寧; pinyin: Chén Yìníng), known in the West as Isabel Chan or Yat Ling Chan, is a Malaysian Chinese actress based in Hong Kong. Chan Yat Ling is the Cantonese equivalent of her Mandarin Chinese name. She has been active as a Cantonese language performer since 1998 and has taken part in films, radio, television and advertising work. She was featured in several films directed by Pang Ho-Cheung, including the romantic comedy Love in a Puff.

== Background ==
Chan Yat Ling was born in 1979 in Malaysia, and grew up in Hong Kong where she attended Canossa College and Po Chiu Catholic Secondary School. At Hong Kong Shue Yan University, she studied Counseling and psychology. She married in 2013, and has a son, Lo Chun Hei.

== Career ==
Until 2007, Isabel Chan was a full-time financial advisor. She has, however, modelled, acted on television and in advertising, and acted in Cantonese language films and videos from 1999; her acting debut was in 1998. As of 2018 she has continued to act in films. She has worked on Hong Kong Radio TV, making music videos.

=== Singing trio MKB48 ===
Under her Mandarin Chinese name of Chan Yat Ling, she is part of a singing trio called MKB48, or Mega Karaoke Bitches 48, named because the trio wished to disband when they reach the age of 48 years. They have revived Legend, previously sung by Raidas in the 80s, and When I Think of You by Danny Chan. The remake of Legend has been described as the "song of the year ... (MKB48) is once again inflaming the hearts of fans." Legend (1987) was "a classic work of integrating Chinese musical instruments with the popular British new wave style of the 80s." As of May 2017, MKB48 was considering a tour, after a successful performance in Guangzhou.

== Filmography ==
=== As Chan Yat Ling, or Isabel Chan ===
In 1999, she was in The Truth About Jane and Sam directed by Derek Yee, and played Nurse Joe Chan in Fly Me to Polaris by Jingle Ma. In 2000, she performed in I.Q. Dudettes by Frankie Chan, What is a Good Teacher, And I Hate You So, and the video Fei hu xiong shi zhi Zhong Huan cha shi xiong sha an. In 2001 she was in Yau leng ching shu. In 2003, she starred as Gucci in the video My Grandma Is a Kung Fu Master! In that year, she did four The New Option videos: The Syndicate, The Final Showdown, The Campaign, and Confrontation, and a series of four more with Cantonese titles: Fei hu xiong shi zhi jiu shi zhe, Fei hu xiong shi zhi jie jin feng bao, Fei hu xiong shi zhi fu chou, and Fei hu xiong shi zhi bian yuan ren, in which she played Bibi.

In 2004, she was in Sex and the Beauties and PaPa Loves You, and played a teenager outside the curio shop in The Miracle Box. In 2005, she played the lead, Lisa, in Set to Kill by Marco Mak, and was in the film The China's Next Top Princess. In 2007, she played Wai-Ying in Trivial Matters, in the segment "It's a Festival Today", produced by Pang Ho-cheung. In 2008 she starred in a short, called Mr Right. She was in Lazy Hazy Crazy in 2015, and in Paws-Men in 2018.

=== As Isabel Chan ===
In 2003, she played Joey in Looking For Mister Perfect and Blind Chu's wife in Colour of the Truth. She starred as young Flavia in Butterfly by Yan Yan Mak in 2004. In 2005, she was in Dragon Reloaded, and in 2006 she played Fonda's bridesmaid in The Shopaholics by Wai Ka-fai. She played Isabel in a series of three films directed by Pang Ho-cheung: Love in a Puff (Hong Kong title: Chun Jiao yu Zhi Ming, 2010), Love in the Buff (2012) and Love Off the Cuff (2017).

=== As Chan Yat Ling ===
In 2019, she played the lead in Missbehavior (Congratulations to Ba Po, or Congratulations on the Eight Women) directed by Pang Ho-cheung.

== Awards ==
- 1999 Seattle International Film Festival China Stars award for actors in best new film or TV series: Summer Vacation before Y2K.
