= Chen Xue =

Chen Xue may refer to:

- Xue Chen, Chinese beach volleyball player
- Chen Xue (writer), Taiwanese writer
