= Xiandai Wenxue =

Taiwanese literary journal

Xiandai Wenxue (Chinese: 現代文學; lit. 'Modern Literature') was a Chinese-language Taiwanese literary journal created in 1960. The journal was published on a bimonthly basis.

The journal was the brainchild of several National Taiwan University students, including Ouyang Tzu, Wang Wen-hsing and Pai Hsien-yung. The journal published the literary debuts of several prominent Taiwanese writers, and emulated the modernist style that was becoming fashionable in Taiwanese literature during the late-1950s and 1960s. In 1973 the journal ended publication.
