= Brothers (2016 film) =

- Poster
- Chinese: 钢刀
- Directed by: Ah Gan
- Production companies: Shenzhen Jinhaian Industry; China Film Group Corporation; Xi'an Qujiang Film&TV Investment Group; Zhejiang Tianmao Technology; Beijing Jinhaian Digital Picture Technology
- Distributed by: China Film Group Corporation; Zhejiang Tianmao Technology
- Release date: 20 May 2016
- Running time: 94 minutes
- Country: China
- Language: Mandarin
- Box office: CN¥9.3 million

Brothers is a 2016 Chinese war action drama film directed by Ah Gan. It was released in China by China Film Group Corporation and Zhejiang Tianmao Technology on 20 May 2016.

== Plot ==
The film centers on the relationship between two brothers who used to have a bond for life but it is ripped apart through a civil war in 1936.

== Cast ==
- Peter Ho
- Ethan Li
- Xia Zitong
- Yang Qiming
- Tian Yuan
- He Lanpeng
- Song Ning
- Wang Wang
- Huang Tianyuan

== Reception ==
The film has grossed CN¥9.3 million at the Chinese box office.
