= Missbehavior =

2019 Hong Kong film by Pang Ho-cheung

- Directed by: Pang Ho-cheung
- Written by: Pang Ho-cheung; Sunny Lau
- Produced by: Subi Liang
- Cinematography: Jam Yau
- Edited by: Wenders Li
- Music by: Wong Ngai-lun; Janet Yung
- Production company: Making Film
- Release date: 2019
- Running time: 88 minutes
- Country: Hong Kong
- Language: Cantonese

Missbehavior (Chinese: 恭喜八婆; Jyutping: gung1 hei2 baat3 po4; pinyin: Gōngxǐ Bāpó) is a 2019 Hong Kong film by Pang Ho-cheung. It is co-written by Pang and Sunny Lau.

== Plot ==
After June accidentally served her boss's breast milk to a client, she assembles a group of her estranged friends on WeChat to find a replacement bottle before her boss leaves.

== Cast ==
- Isabel Chan — Isabel
- Dada Chan — Rosalin Lin
- Gigi Leung — May, the policewoman
- June Lam — June, the office worker searching for breast milk
- Chui Tien You — Frank
- Hanjin Tan — Boris
- Isabella Leong — June's boss, Luna Fu
- Patrick Tse — the important client

== Production ==
The film was shot over 14 days with a heavy use of improvisation.

== Release and reception ==
It was released over Chinese New Year. Edmund Lee of the South China Morning Post gave the film three of five stars and wrote that while he liked the wordplay humour the script was "hit or miss". Arturo Arredondo for the Georgia Asian Times gave the film four out of five stars, praising the cast's acting and improvisational skills. Elizabeth Kerr of The Hollywood Reporter praised the film's blend of coarse and witty humour but noted its regional Hong Kong idiosyncrasies as a barrier for international appeal.
