= Beijing International Film Festival =

Film festival in Beijing China

- Location: Beijing, China
- Founded: 2011
- Awards: Tiantan Award; Future Forward Award
- Hosted by: China Film Administration, China Media Group, Beijing Government
- Website: www.bjiff.com/enHome/

Current: 2024
- 2025 2023

The Beijing International Film Festival (Chinese: 北京国际电影节), abbreviated BJIFF, is a film festival in Beijing, China. Founded in 2011, along with the Shanghai International Film Festival, it is one of China's two biggest film festivals.

The festival is one of the world's most prominent film festivals. Since its launch, it has been heavily attended by Hollywood executives, directors, producers, and studio heads, as well as filmmakers and actors from all over the world. It serves as an international venue for different cultures around the globe to communicate.

The festival has two in-competition sections. The Tiantan Award Competition aims is to promote diversity in world cinema, and the Forward Future Competition aims to highlight first second features.

As China's box office has expanded exponentially over the past decade, the festival aims to provide a high-profile forum for the interaction between the Chinese and the international film industries.

BJIFF is organized by China Film Administration, China Media Group, and Beijing Government.

== Festival programme ==
=== Official Selection Competition ===
The two in-competition, official sections are the Tiantan and the Forward Future.

==== Tiantan Award ====
The "Tiantan Award" was established in 2012 and began its selection process in 2013. The award adheres to the value concept of "unity of man and nature, beauty shared by all." It is evaluated with an international perspective, standardized procedures, and professional standards. The judges are composed of masters and celebrities from the international film industry. The award aims to discover and collect the latest and best works worldwide, encourage film diversity, and serve as the highest award for the Beijing International Film Festival.

The design concept of the Tiantan Award trophy originates from the core value concept of "unity of man and nature, beauty shared by all". The overall height of the trophy is 45 cm, with a base height of 9 cm and a cup height of 36 cm, both multiples of "9", which symbolizes the highest honor of the Tiantan Award. The homophonic sound of "9" means "long-lasting" and means people admire for auspiciousness.

==== Forward Future ====
The "Forward Future" section was established in 2014 to encourage innovative spirit in film-making, stimulating creativity in film art; discovering and promoting new filmmakers; capturing trends and tendencies in international film; showcase rich and diverse cultural connotations in film art; enhance cooperation and communication among young filmmakers from various countries. This section is dedicated to encouraging new directors and originality. The films selected must be the director's first or second feature-length films.

=== Beijing Film Panorama ===
The Beijing Film Panorama is one of the most popular sections for moviegoers at the Beijing International Film Festival. Hundreds of domestic and foreign films are screened at dozens of participating cinemas in Beijing during this event. It includes over ten sub-sections, such as Jury Chairman, Classic Restoration, Tribute to Filmmakers, Focus Filmmakers, Global Vision, Chinese Power, etc., and nearly a hundred main creative meetings for audiences. It is one of the largest international film festivals in China.

=== Beijing Film Market ===
The Beijing Film Market was formerly known as the "Film Market". Since 2019 it has been renamed as the "Beijing Film Market". It includes sections such as investment promotion exhibitions, project investment financing, industry dialogues, special events, signing ceremonies, film promotion meetings, etc., with a theme of "displaying, promoting, communicating, and trading". It builds three significant platforms for "film elements", "project investment" and "copyright trading", covering the entire film industry chain to promote the development of the film industry. It is one of Asia's most active film markets.

=== Theme Forum ===
The Beijing Planning · Theme Forum aims to promote international exchanges on film concepts, art, and technology; enhance China's understanding and reference to the global film industry; promote domestic and foreign film cooperation; explore the latest developments in film art and technology.

==== Film Master Class ====
The Film Master Class invites filmmakers from China and abroad to give lectures on topics including their careers, approaches to filmmaking, and developments and challenges within the film industry. The programme also provides opportunities for filmmakers to discuss their professional experiences with audiences.

=== Beijing College Student Film Festival ===
The Beijing College Student Film Festival was founded in 1993. It aims to inspire college students' attention to Chinese films; discover young talents among college students in film theory and criticism; promote talent cultivation reserve for Chinese film theory talents; develop a Chinese film criticism career. Since its establishment in 2011 by Beijing International Film Festival, it has been merged into one of its parallel sections.

== Awards ==
=== Tiantan Award ===
- Best Feature Film
- Best Director
- Best Artistic Contribution
- Best Leading Actor
- Best Leading Actress
- Best Supporting Actor
- Best Supporting Actress
- Best Screenplay
- Best Cinematography
- Best Music

=== Forward Future ===
- Best Film
- Best Director
- Best Screenplay
- Best Actress
- Best Actor
- Best Artistic Contribution
- Jury Special Mention

== 2012 Festival ==
Notable international guest speakers at the 2012 festival including James Cameron, who unveiled the details of the upcoming Avatar sequels at the film festival; Jim Gianopulos, Jeremy Renner, Tom DeSanto, Jon Landau, who were there to discuss co-productions between Hollywood and Chinese film studios.

== 2013 Festival ==
Notable guests at the 2013 festival includes Lucasfilm president Kathleen Kennedy, Paul Hanneman, Keanu Reeves, and Peter Chan. Luc Besson, Jean-Jacques Annaud, and Wolfgang Petersen also discussed their upcoming co-productions in China at the festival.

== 2014 Festival ==
The 2014 festival saw Jean Reno, Alfonso Cuaron, Paramount Pictures COO Frederick Huntsberry, Oliver Stone, MPAA president Christopher Dodd, Peter Del Vecho, Carlos Saldanha, John Woo, Timur Bekmambetov, Peter Ziering, Andres Vicente Gomez, Rajkumar Hirani and Jim Sheridan. The festival also saw a large representation from the BFI, the British Film Commission and BBC, who are aiming for a closer co-production agreement with China.

== 2015 Festival ==
The 2015 festival saw Arnold Schwarzenegger, and Darren Aronofsky attend the event in April.

== 2016 Festival ==
The 2016 festival saw Natalie Portman, and Christoph Waltz as well as Brett Ratner, Sam Raimi, Yojiro Takita, Giuseppe Tornatore and Iain Smith attend the event in April.

== 2019 Festival ==
The 2019 festival was held from April 13 to the 20th.

== 2020 Festival ==
The 2020 Festival was postponed owing to the COVID-19 pandemic. It was later held from August 22 to the 29th.

== 2021 Festival ==
The 11th Beijing International Film Festival, which was originally scheduled for August 14 to 21, and postponed in the aftermath of COVID-19, was held from the 21 to 29 September 2021.

== 2022 Festival ==
The 12th Beijing International Film Festival was held from August 13 to 20, 2022

== 2023 Festival ==
The 13th Beijing International Film Festival was held from April 25 to 27, 2023

== 2024 Festival ==
The 14th edition of the festival was scheduled to be held April 18–26, 2024.

== 2025 Festival ==
The 15th edition of the festival was held from April 17 to 27, 2025

== 2026 Festival ==
The 16th edition of the festival was held in April from 16 to 25, 2026.

== Censorship ==
Amid increasing criticism of China's tightening of censorship, the 2018 Festival attracted controversy when Chinese Government censors banned the Festival from screening the Oscar-winning Call Me by Your Name (film), throwing a spotlight on LGBT rights in China. In 2014, China had shut down the Beijing Independent Film Festival, and in January 2020, The China Independent Film Festival (CIFF) shut down operations, citing censorship concerns.

== See also ==
- Beijing Independent Film Festival, an independent film festival in the same city
- List of film festivals in China
