= Butterfly (2004 film) =

2004 Hong Kong film by Yan Yan Mak

- Film poster
- Directed by: Yan Yan Mak
- Screenplay by: Yan Yan Mak
- Based on: The Mark of Butterfly by Chen Xue
- Produced by: Jacqueline Liu; Yan Yan Mak
- Starring: Josie Ho; Tian Yuan; Eric Kot; Isabel Chan; Joman Chiang
- Cinematography: Charlie Lam
- Edited by: Eric Lau; Stanley Tam
- Production company: Filmko Pictures
- Distributed by: Paramount Pictures (US)
- Release dates: 4 September 2004 (Venice Film Festival); 2 December 2004 (Hong Kong)
- Running time: 124 minutes
- Country: Hong Kong
- Languages: Cantonese; Mandarin

Butterfly (Chinese: 蝴蝶 Húdié) is a 2004 Hong Kong drama film based on Taiwanese writer Chen Xue's novel The Mark of Butterfly (蝴蝶的記號). The film was directed by female award-winning director Yan Yan Mak and produced by Jacqueline Liu and Yan Yan Mak with the sponsorship of Hong Kong Arts Development Council.

== Plot ==
The film follows Flavia (Josie Ho), a married high school teacher, who meets a beautiful free-spirited female singer-songwriter named Yip (Tian Yuan) and strikes up a relationship with the younger girl. Flavia is a closeted lesbian because she was brought up in a society where homosexuality was not accepted. When Flavia was a teenager, she fell in love with a girl in her class, but was forced to end the relationship when it was discovered by her parents. Heartbroken, she eventually married a competent and caring businessman after graduating from university. Now in her 30s and married with a child, she meets Yip. Flavia is deeply attracted to Yip's carefree personality and bright spirit, and falls for Yip in the same way she fell for her first love in high school. She slowly dares to break out while worried about the consequences but at the same time, hopeful about finding her true self again.

== Cast ==
- Josie Ho as Flavia - Ming's wife
- Eric Kot as Ming - Flavia's husband
- Yuan Tian as Yip - Singer
- Stephanie Che as Jin / Flavia's school sweetheart
- Yat Ning Chan as Young Flavia (billed as Isabel Chan)
- Joman Chiang as Young Jin
- Kenneth Tsang as Flavia's dad
- Pauline Yam as Rosa - Yip's roommate
- Carl Ng as Carl - Man in Macau bar
- Yuen-Leung Poon as Man in coffee shop
- Redbean Lau as Flavia's mum
- Brenda Chan as Samantha's mother
- King-Suen Chan as Student demonstrator
- Kathi DeCouto as University Professor
- Alice Lee as Pauline
- Nicky Shih as Demonstrator & university student
- Stanley Tam as Chemistry teacher
- Wong Sin Ting Zeni as Muriel - Flavia's student

== Soundtrack ==
The film features a set of interesting music and songs from various artists such as Múm, an experimental Icelandic musical group; Hopscotch, Tian Yuan's independent Chinese band and at17, a Hong Kong Folktronica band.

- "Now There's That Fear Again", from Múm's album Finally We Are No One,
- "Sleep, Swim" (as above),
- "Green Grass of Tunnel" (as above),
- "Weeping Rock, Rock", from Múm's album Summer Make Good,
- "A Wishful Way", from Hopscotch's (Tian Yuan's band) album A Wishful Way
- "She" (as above),
- "The Best is Yet to Come", from at17's album Meow Meow Meow.

== Casting and hidden feature ==
According to the commentary on the DVD, director Yan Yan Mak invited Ellen Joyce Loo and Eman Lam of at17 to star as two of Flavia's students who also fall in love with each other, but they rejected the roles. The role later was taken by Isabel Chan and Joman Chiang.

There is a hidden music video of the song "I will see you", sung by Tian Yuan, in the DVD (2005 Hong Kong version).

== Reception ==
Butterfly was chosen as the Opening Film at Venice Film Festival Critics Week and Tian Yuan was awarded as the Best New Artist at the Hong Kong Film Awards in 2005. The film was also nominated at the Taiwan Golden Horse Awards in 2004 for Best Adapted Screenplay (Yan Yan Mak) and Best New Performer (Tian Yuan). Also, actress Josie Ho received a nomination at the Golden Bauhinia Awards for Best Actress and at ILMA Awards for Best Leading Actress, both in 2005.

Also, a blogger on Grace the Spot, a lesbian entertainment and pop culture blog, rated Butterfly as her favourite lesbian film.

== See also ==
- List of LGBT-related films directed by women
- List of Hong Kong films
