= National Academy for Educational Research =

Government agency in Taiwan

- 國家教育研究院

Agency overview
- Formed: 30 March 2011
- Preceding agencies: National Institute for Compilation and Translation; National Education Archives
- Headquarters: Sanxia, New Taipei, Taiwan; 24.93700900°N 121.37702900°E
- Agency executives: Ko Hwa-wei, President; Tzeng Shih-jay, Academic Vice President; Pan Wen-chung, Administrative Vice President
- Parent agency: Ministry of Education
- Website: www.naer.edu.tw

The National Academy for Educational Research (NAER; Chinese: 國家教育研究院; pinyin: Guójiā Jiàoyù Yánjiùyuàn) is the agency of the Ministry of Education of Taiwan responsible for conducting research in the field of education, offering training courses to school administrators, and developing educational resources.

== History ==
The agency was established in 2011.

== Organizational structure ==
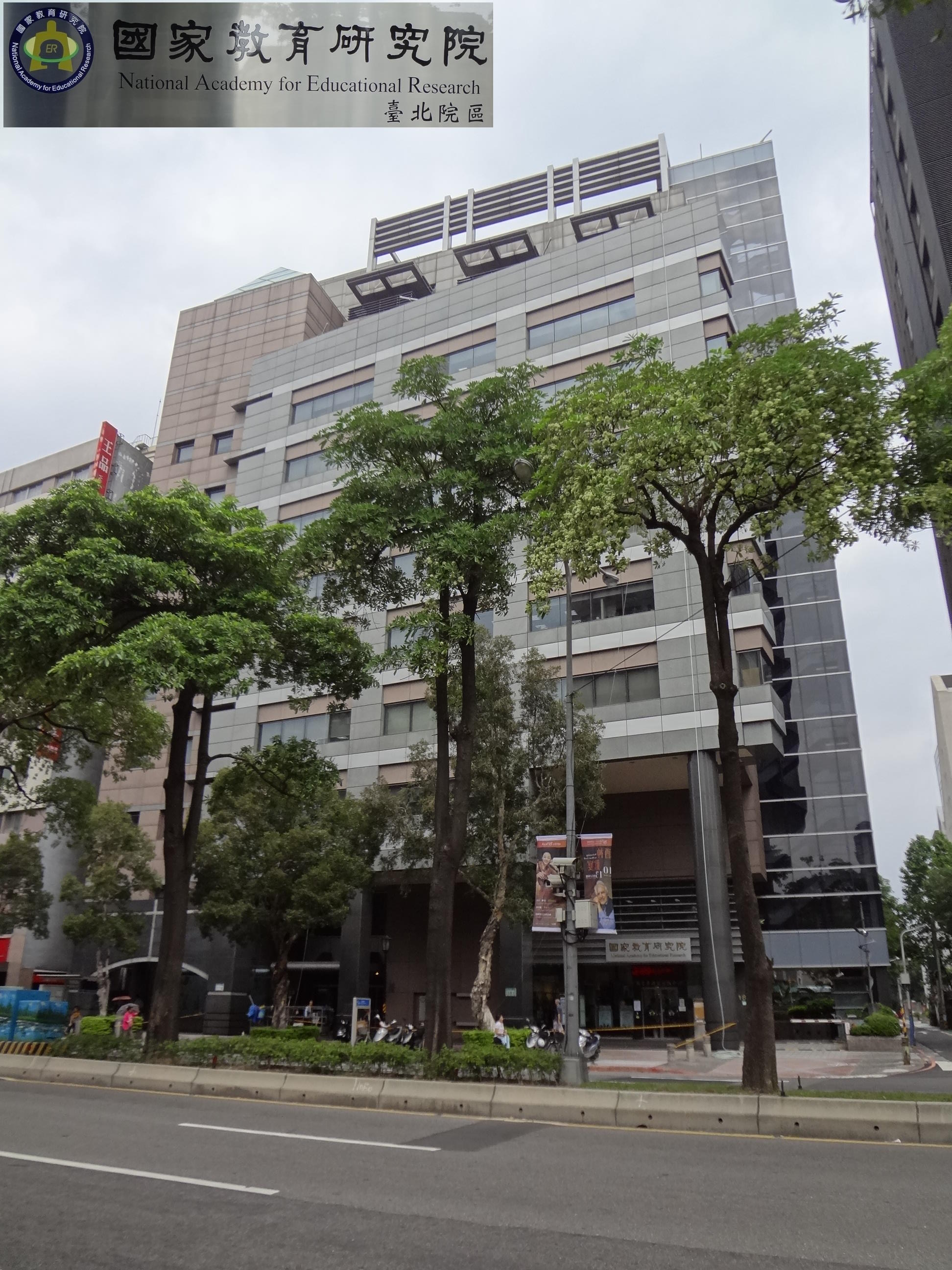
NAER Taipei branch

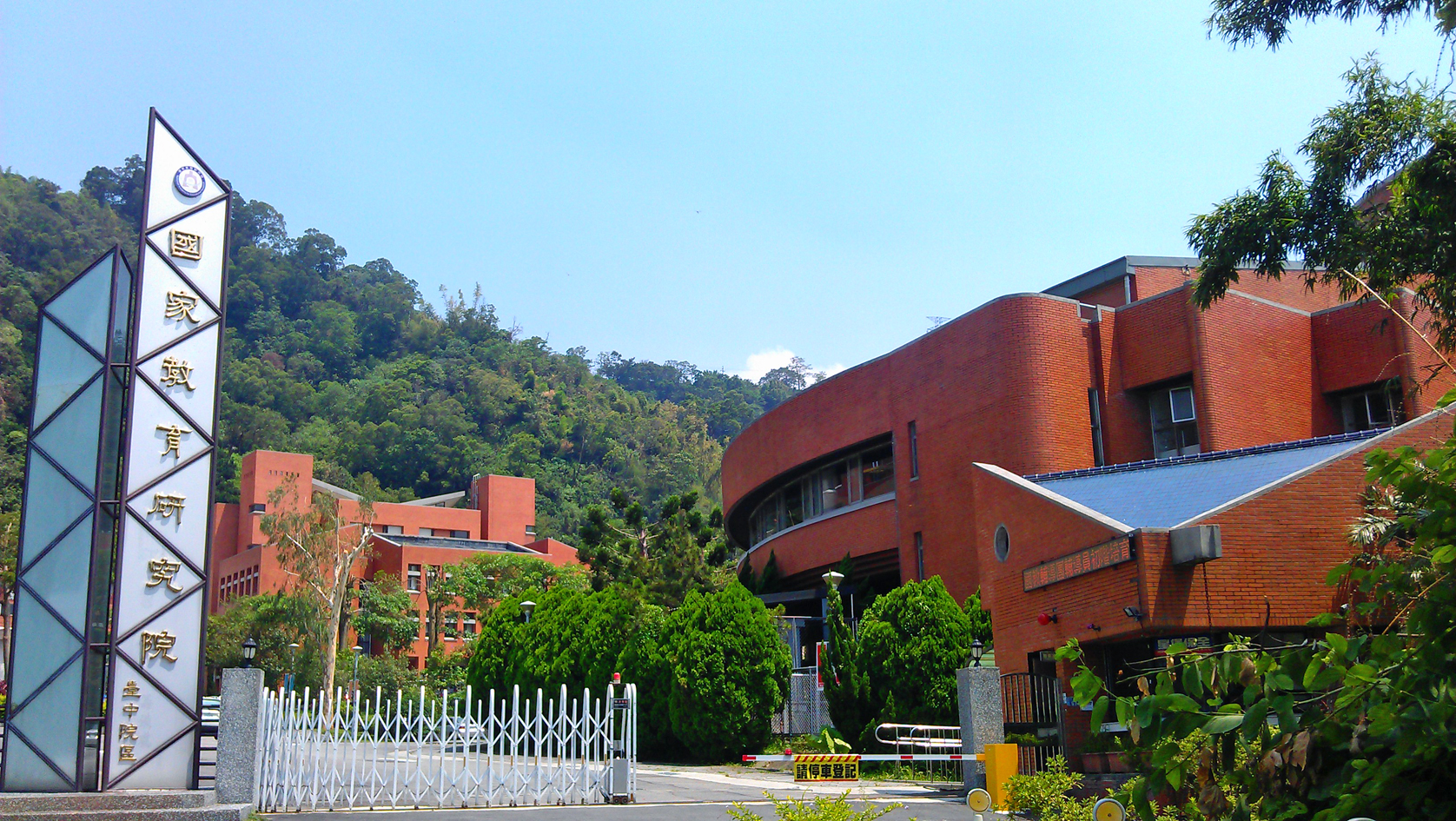
NAER Taichung branch

=== Operational divisions ===
- Research Center for Educational System and Policy
- Center for Educational Resources and Publishing
- Research Center for Testing and Assessment
- Research Center for Curriculum and Instruction
- Development Center for Textbook
- Center for Educational Leadership and Professional Development
- Development Center for Compilation and Translation

=== Administrative divisions ===
- Office of R&D and International Affairs
- Office of General Affairs
- Personnel Office
- Accounting Office

== Branches ==
- Taipei Branch
- Taichung Branch

== See also ==
- Ministry of Education (Taiwan)
- National Institute for Compilation and Translation
