= Yusan Hall =

Former residence in Yongjing, Changhua County, Taiwan

- 餘三館
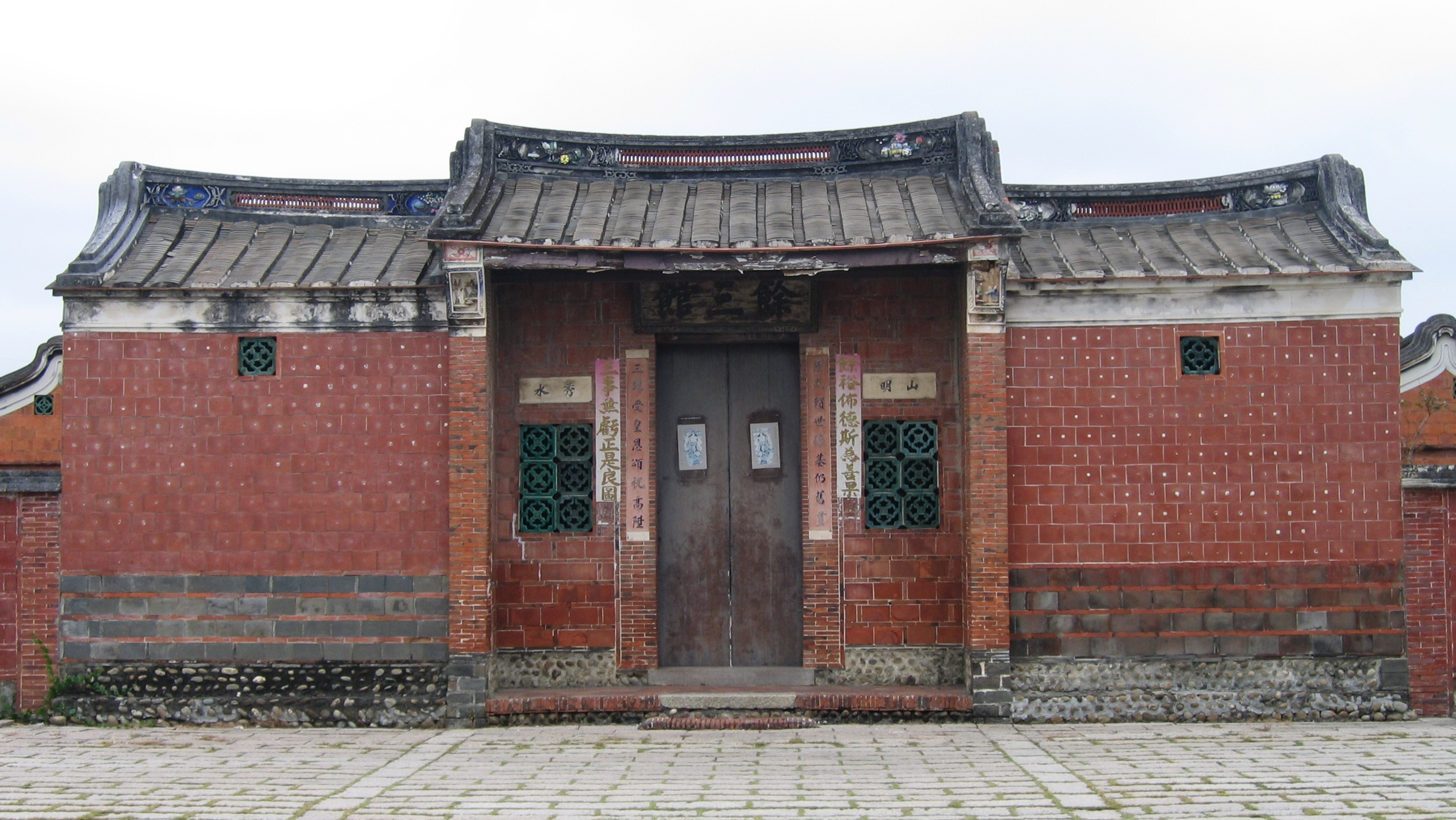
- Interactive map of the Yusan Hall area

General information
- Type: mansion
- Location: Yongjing, Changhua County, Taiwan
- Coordinates: 23°54′45.8″N 120°32′30.4″E
- Completed: 1884

The Yusan Hall (traditional Chinese: 餘三館; simplified Chinese: 余三馆; pinyin: Yúsān Guǎn) is private mansion in Yongjing Township, Changhua County, Taiwan.

== History ==
The building was built during the reign of Tongzhi Emperor in 1884 by Chen Yu-kuang, the 15th generation of the Chen family. The mansion was constructed in 7.5 years.

== Architecture ==
The main structure has been well preserved in its original Qing Dynasty architecture.

== Transportation ==
The building is accessible south west of Yongjing Station of Taiwan Railway.

== See also ==
- List of tourist attractions in Taiwan
