= Guangzhou International Documentary Film Festival =

The Guangzhou International Documentary Film Festival (Chinese: 广州国际纪录片电影节) is a state-endorsed documentary film festival held in the city of Guangzhou, China. It is one of the biggest documentary film festivals in China. GZDOC mainly focus on the film itself.

== See also ==
- List of film festivals in China
