= Tian Yuan (singer) =

- Born: 30 March 1985 (age 41)
- Origin: Wuhan, China
- Genres: Indie rock, trip hop
- Occupations: singer-songwriter; actress; novelist; photographer
- Instruments: vocal, guitar
- Years active: 2001–present
- Label: Dong Music
- Formerly of: Hopscotch
- Website: dongmusic.com/artists/tianyuan

Tian Yuan (Chinese: 田原; pinyin: Tián Yuán; born 30 March 1985) is a Chinese singer-songwriter, actress, novelist and photographer. Born in Wuhan, China, she majored in English at Beijing Language and Culture University, and graduated in 2007.

== Music career ==
At age of only 16, she joined local band Hopscotch as vocal and lyricist. The band was signed under to major label Modern Sky in 2002, and released their first English-language album that year, titled A Wishful Way. The album was influenced by trip hop and indie rock, and well received by some critics and general public in China due to its fresh sound. Tian Yuan's singing career paused temporarily when a contract dispute occurred between her and Modern Sky. Tian Yuan is now recording her first solo album under a new label, Dong Music. Her 11-song solo album Tian Yuan was released in 2010.

== Writing career ==
In 2002, Tian released her English-language novel, Zebra Woods, which received some international acclaim, and wrote a collection of short stories while touring for A Wishful Way, which was later published in China. In May 2007, Tian Yuan released her second novel Double Mono, a novel about love, youth and self-discovery.

== Acting career ==
Tian's acting debut was in the 2004 Hong Kong film Butterfly, which she starred as a lesbian singer, alongside Josie Ho. Her performance won an award as the Best New Performer at the 24th Hong Kong Film Award and Taiwan's Golden Horse Film Awards.

== Filmography ==
=== Films ===
Year	Title	Director	Additional information
2004	Butterfly (蝴蝶)	Yan Yan Mak	Won Best New Performer at the 24th Hong Kong Film Awards; Nominated for Best New Performer at the 42nd Golden Horse Awards; In competition of 2004 Venice Film Festival
2005	The Curse of Lola (诅咒)	李虹 (Li Hong)	In competition of 2005 Tokyo International Film Festival
2006	August Story (八月的故事)	Yan Yan Mak	Won Best Feature Film of 2006 Tainan Film Festival; In competition of 2006 Tokyo International Film Festival; In competition of 2006 International Film Festival Rotterdam
2006	Luxury Car (江城夏日)	Wang Chao	Won Un Certain Regard of 2006 Cannes Film Festival
2006	Young and Clueless (青春期)	唐大年 (Tang Danian)	In competition of 2006 Tokyo International Film Festival.
2007	In Love We Trust (左右)	Wang Xiaoshuai	Won Best Screenplay of 2008 Berlin International Film Festival; Cameo
2007	Fury or Love (怒放)	辛巨擘 (Xin Jubai)	In competition of 2007 Rio de Janeiro International Film Festival
2007	Shanghai Trance (迷乐上海)	David Verbeek	In competition of 2008 International Film Festival Rotterdam; In competition of 2008 Shanghai International Film Festival
2007	With You Forever (跟你沒完)	安战军 (An Zhanjun)	
2008	Happy Funeral (六楼后座2家属谢礼)	Wong Chun-chun	The sequel of Truth or Dare: 6th Floor Rear Flat
2008	Gao Xing	刘晓光 Liu Xiaoguang	
2010	Who Killed Paul the Octopus?		
2012	Tokyo Newcomer		
2012	First Time		
2013	Bends		
2014	One Day		as co-director
2014	The Golden Era		
2014	Who Is Undercover		
2016	Spicy Hot in Love		
2016	Brothers		
2019	Pegasus		
2019	A Sweet Life		

=== Short films ===
2014	Freeze Frame	Anthony Fabian	With Freddie Fox (as Chen Fei and Jack MacMurray)
2006	我把初吻献给谁－条形码	韩延 Han Yan	
2006	Our Ten Years (我们的十年)	Jia Zhangke	Short film of Southern Metropolis Daily
2007	中国式美丽	Jia Zhangke	Commercial film of Olay
2007	尋找沙漠中的美人鱼	Li Guang (黎光)	

=== Music video appearances ===
Year	Title	Director	Additional information
2005	I See You	Yan Yan Mak	Hidden in Butterfly's DVD
2005	诺言 (Promise)	陈家炜 (Chen Jiawei), 单晓帆 (Dan Xiaofan)	
2006	So Poetic	Yan Yan Mak	
2007	白色呼吸		
