= Beijing Independent Film Festival =

Film festival

The Beijing Independent Film Festival (Chinese: 北京独立电影节) is an annual independent film festival that took place in Songzhuang, China from 2004 to 2014. It has a history of being challenged by the Chinese authorities.

The organizer of the event is the Li Xianting Film Fund, founded by Li Xianting. The executive director is Fan Rong.

The government cut the festival's power on opening night in 2012, limited screenings to no more than 2 people in 2013, before detaining organizers and barricading screening rooms in 2014. The government also confiscated an irreplaceable archive of independent films. That 11th edition of the festival, scheduled to run from Saturday 23 August 2014 until the end of the month did not open, after police detained the organizers and forced them to write a letter to say they were cancelling the event. Police blocked off access to the site, while electricity to the venue was cut off. Organizers said the local authorities had been unhelpful in the days leading up to the festival's opening and pressure had been brought to bear for the event not to proceed. It was understood by the organizers that the government was concerned the festival would be used as a forum to criticize the government.

A tribute by Cinema On The Edge to the festival and the filmmakers it supported was screened in New York City in 2015 with a collection of some of the festival's best independent films from 2012 to 2014. Following the success of the screenings, Cinema On The Edge announced a tour called "China Now: Independent Visions", that ran in years 2015-2016, and was hosted in places including Toronto, Tromsø, and Paris.

== See also ==
- Beijing International Film Festival, a film festival sponsored by the Beijing Municipal Government
- Beijing Queer Film Festival
- List of film festivals in China
