= I.Q. Dudettes =

2000 Hong Kong film by Frankie Chan

- Traditional Chinese: 辣椒教室
- Hanyu Pinyin: La jiao jiao shi
- Directed by: Frankie Chan
- Produced by: David Chan
- Starring: Frankie Chan; Colleen Chan; Irene Santiago Casiano; Monica Chan; Yat Ning Chan; Ho Wai Chang; Audrey Fang; Siu Ming Fu; Spencer Lam; Siu-Kwan Lau
- Cinematography: Yuen Man Fung
- Edited by: Peter Cheung; Chi Wai Yau
- Music by: Jerry Lee; Mark Lui; Mak Chun Hung
- Production companies: Golden Child Amusement; GH Pictures (China)
- Distributed by: Golden Harvest
- Release date: 6 January 2000; (Hong Kong)
- Running time: ca. 109 min.
- Country: Hong Kong
- Language: Cantonese
- Box office: 1.02 M. HK$

I.Q. Dudettes is a 2000 Hong Kong drama film directed by Frankie Chan and produced by David Chan.

== Cast ==
- Frankie Chan
- Colleen Chan
- Irene Santiago Casiano
- Monica Chan
- Yat Ning Chan
- Ho Wai Chang
- Audrey Fang
- Siu Ming Fu
