= BigScreen Festival =

Chinese and Italian cinema film festival

Coordinates: 25.0464°N 102.7094°E

The BigScreen Festival or BigScreen Italia is a film festival that focuses on Chinese and Italian cinema. It was first held in 2004 in Padua, Italy, but in 2006 moved to Kunming, Yunnan, China.

== BigScreen Asia '01 ==
The first edition of Big Screen took place in Padua, Italy, from 18 to 24 March 2004. This festival was organized by the portal Cinaoggi.it and the University Student Association (ASU) together with Progetti Giovani. Other associations including the commune of Padova, the University of Padova, and the Shanghai Theatre Academy collaborated with the festival. The festival screened several works from Italy and China. Students of the Shanghai Theatre also screened their works. It was the first Asian Cinema Festival in Padova.

The artistic directors of the festival were Dominique Musorrafiti and Matteo Damiani. The festival featured works by Wong Kar-wai, Wang Xiaoshuai, Jia Zhangke, Fruit Chan, Hayao Miyazaki, Osamu Tezuka, Kazuhisa Takenouchi, Hugo Ng, and Kiyoshi Kurosawa. Guests included Wu Baohe, a professor at the Shanghai Theatre Academy, Marco Ceresa, and Marcello Ghirardi.

== BigScreen Pills ==
BigScreen Pills, also organised by Cinaoggi and ASU, took place from 11 to 12 May 2005, a selection of short films, video art, movies and documentaries leading up to the second edition of BigScreen Asia. The end of the evening featured a concert by the Japanese band Mono.

Musorrafiti and Damiani were again the artistic directors, and the event was hosted by Valentina Pedone and Felix Schoeber. Works featured included Lisa Partby (The New Flowers of Beijing, Pao ma liu liu), abelvideo, He Jia, Guan Jang, Zhang Yang, Singing Chen, Chen Chieh-jen, Tsui Kuang-Yu, Hu Jieming.

== BigScreen Asia '02 ==
The second year of the BigScreen festival took place from 24 to 28 October 2005, featuring a selection of modern Thai cinema, a substantial display of short Korean films, a photographic exhibition, and a concert on Asian themes by Claudio Rocchetti. This was accompanied by the presentation of works by more well-known producers, including Wang Xiaoshuai, Wong Karwai, Fruit Chan, Rintaro, Katsuhiro Otomo, Zhang Yang and Jia Zhangke.

The festival was hosted by Marco Ceresa, Marco Della Gassa, Marcello Ghiraldi, and Stefano Locati.

== BigScreen Italia 2006 ==
In November 2005 the organizers of CinaOggi moved to Kunming, China, and took the BigScreen Festival with them. The festival grew and became more of a competition. Italian universities including "La Sapienza" (Rome), the University of Naples, the Oriental languages department of the "Ca' Foscari" University of Venice, the Young Italian Artists Association (GAI), and the Yunnan Arts Institute collaborated on the project, which took place in Kunming from 19 to 23 July 2006. The festival had a particular focus on Bruno Bozzetto.

The international jury included Wang Xiaoshuai, Jia Zhangke, artist Ye Yongqing, Marco Ceresa, and Song Jie, Dean of the Yunnan Arts Institute Cinema and Television Department.

=== Winners ===
- Jury Award (shorts, videoart, videoclip, animation): Aziz directed by Fabio Bozzetto, Gigi Tufano, and Diego Zucchi
- Jury Award (movies, documentaries): Un'ora sola ti vorrei directed by Alina Marazzi
- Public Award (shorts, videoart, videoclip, animation): Aziz directed by Fabio Bozzetto, Gigi Tufano, and Diego Zucchi
- Public Award (movies, documentaries): Appunti Romani directed by Marco Bertozzi

== BigScreen Festival 2007 ==
The 2007 festival was held in Kunming, Yunnan, from 27 November – 1 December 2007, featuring 94 films from more 30 countries. The festival was co-organized by CinaOggi.it, GoKunming.com, Yunnan Experimental Film Base, under the patronage of Istituto Italiano di Cultura. The official supporting media was the Chinese newspaper Dushi Shibao.

The winning films from BigScreen Film Festival 2007 were announced by a jury composed of Marco Ceresa of the "Ca' Foscari" University in Venice, screenwriter Wang Yao and Jeremy Goldkorn, founder of Danwei.org. Four films by French director Jean-Gabriel Périot (Even if she had been a criminal, Dies Irae, Under Twilight and Nijuman No Borei) were collectively honoured as the best entries in the video art and experimental films category. The jurors said they based their selections upon the theme of modernity vs tradition, which was a common thread in all the winning movies. Special guests included the Hong Kong director Yan Yan Mak, who presented her movie The Scarlet Robe starring the singer Denise Ho and the Japanese singer Tujiko Noriko. The festival had a special focus on the work of Don Askarian and Lasse Gjertsen.

=== Winners ===
- Best long film: The Scarlet Robe by Yan Yan Mak
- Best short film: Il Vecchio e la Fontana by Tony Palazzo
- Best documentary: Living in A Perfect World by Diego D'Innocenzo and Marco Leopardi
- Best animation: Almost Like One of the Family by Astrid Goransson
- Best entries in the video art and experimental films: Even if she had been a criminal, Dies Irae, Under Twilight and Nijuman No Borei by Jean-Gabriel Périot

== See also ==
- List of film festivals in China
