= Pai Hsien-yung =

Taiwanese writer (born 1937)

- 白先勇
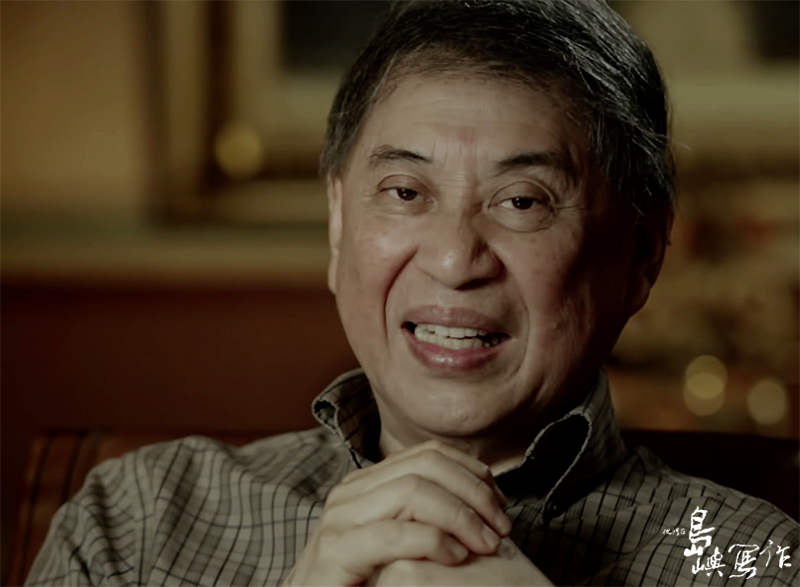
- Born: July 11, 1937 (age 89); Nanning, Guangxi, Republic of China
- Education: National Cheng Kung University; National Taiwan University (BA); University of Iowa (MFA)
- Relatives: Bai Chongxi (father)
- Writing career
- Period: 1958–present
- Notable works: Taipei People; Crystal Boys; New Yorkers
- Notable awards: Order of Brilliant Star (2015)

Kenneth Hsien-yung Pai (Chinese: 白先勇; pinyin: Bái Xiānyǒng; Wade–Giles: Pai Hsien-yung; Pe̍h-ōe-jī: Pe̍h Sian-ióng; born July 11, 1937) is a Taiwanese and American novelist, short-story writer, and playwright. A distinguished professor-at-large at the Chinese University of Hong Kong, he is often described as a "melancholy pioneer" of modern Chinese literature.

Born in Nanning, Guangxi to Kuomintang general Bai Chongxi at the cusp of the Second Sino-Japanese War, Pai endured a childhood mired with illness, isolation, and constant migration across Chongqing, Shanghai, Nanjing, and Hong Kong before reuniting with his family in Taiwan in 1952. Pai co-founded the literary journal Xiandai wenxue while studying English literature at National Taiwan University, and later pursued a Master of Fine Arts degree at the University of Iowa's Writers' Workshop.

Pai took up lecturing in 1965 as a professor of Chinese literature at the University of California, Santa Barbara. During his tenure, he produced many short stories characterized by modernist influences, culminating in Taipei People, his seminal short story collection illustrating the lives of post-war emigres. Pai wrote Crystal Boys, a 1983 novel dealing with themes of homosexuality and sin and credited for popularizing the Tongzhi genre and sparking national debates over LGBTQ issues.

After he retired from lecturing in 1994, Pai's writing became more thematically cosmopolitan. In 2007, he published New Yorkers , which compiling work over four decades ranging from the Cultural Revolution, the AIDS epidemic, and isolation in Chinese-American immigrant life. Pai's interest in Kunqu compelled him to adapt The Peony Pavilion for a younger audience between 2004 and 2005, among wider initiatives to preserve the opera form.

== Early life and education ==
Pai Hsien-yung was born July 11, 1937, in Nanning, Guangxi, Republic of China. as the fifth of ten children of Ma Peizhang and Bai Chongxi, a Hui Muslim general of the Kuomintang. Before he turned one year old, Pai's moved back to Guilin, his ancestral home. Pai later described his father as a "stern, Confucian father" with "some soft spots in his heart."

Pai was diagnosed with tuberculosis at the age of seven, during which time he would have to live in a separate house from his siblings (of which he would have a total of nine). He lived with his family in Chongqing, Shanghai, and Nanjing before moving to the British-controlled Hong Kong in 1948 as CCP forces turned the tide of the Chinese Civil War. There, Pai studied in La Salle College, a Hong Kong Catholic boys' high school, until he reunited with his family in Taiwan in 1952.

In 1956, Pai enrolled at National Cheng Kung University as a hydraulic engineering major because he wanted to participate in the Three Gorges Dam Project. The following year, he passed the entrance examination for the foreign literature department of National Taiwan University and transferred there to study English literature. In September 1958, after completing his first year of study, he published his first short story "Madame Ching" in the magazine Literature. Two years later, he collaborated with several NTU classmates—e.g., Chen Ruoxi, Wang Wen-hsing, Ouyang Tzu—to launch Modern Literature (Xiandai wenxue), in which many of his early works were published. He was also known to frequent the Cafe Astoria in Taipei.

Pai went to the US in 1963 to study literary theory and creative writing at the University of Iowa in the Iowa Writers' Workshop. That same year, Pai's mother, the parent with whom Pai had the closest relationship, died, and he attributes this to the melancholy that pervades his work. After earning his Master of Fine Arts from Iowa, he became a professor of Chinese literature at the University of California, Santa Barbara, and has resided in Santa Barbara ever since. Pai retired from UCSB in 1994. Pai's cousin is Hong Kong radio personality Pamela Peck.

== Major works ==
Pai's most famous work of fiction, Taipei People (Chinese: 臺北人; pinyin: Táiběi rén; Pe̍h-ōe-jī: Tâi-pak-jîn, 1971), is a seminal work of Chinese modernism that mixes both literary Chinese and experimental modernist techniques. In terms of his choice of themes, Pai's work is also far ahead of its time. His novel, Crystal Boys (Chinese: 孽子; pinyin: Nièzǐ; Pe̍h-ōe-jī: Gia̍t-chú, 1983), tells the story of a group of homosexual youths living in 1960s Taipei, largely from the viewpoint of a gay youth who is thrown out of his father's home. The novel's comparison of the dark corners of Taipei's New Park, the characters' main cruising area, with the cloistered society of Taiwan of that period proved quite unacceptable to Taipei's then KMT-dominated establishment, though Pai has generally remained a loyal KMT supporter.

== Influence ==
Among other writers in Taiwan, Pai is appreciated for sophisticated narratives that introduce controversial and groundbreaking perspectives to Chinese literature. His major works, discussed above, have been widely influential.

Further, Pai's writings while in the US in the early 1960s have greatly contributed to an understanding of the Chinese experience in postwar America. "Death in Chicago" (1964) is a semi-autobiographical account of a young Chinese man who, on the eve of his graduation from the English Literature department of the University of Chicago, discovers that his mother has died back home. "Pleasantville" (1964) explores the depressed state of a Chinese mother in the upper-class New York suburbs who feels alienated by the Americanization of her Chinese husband and daughter. Both "Death in Chicago" and "Pleasantville" subtly criticize America as a superficial and materialistic culture that can cause immigrant Chinese to feel lonely and isolated.

In recent years, Pai has gained some acclaim in Mainland Chinese literary circles. He has held various lectures at Beijing Normal University, among others. In the Beijing University Selection of Modern Chinese Literature: 1949–1999 published in 2002, three of Pai's works are included under the time period 1958–1978. These stories reflect the decadence of Shanghai high society in the Republican era. This subject matter constitutes only a small segment of Pai's diverse work, yet it fits particularly well with orthodox renditions of pre-1949 history taught on the Mainland.

In April 2000, a series of five books representing Pai's lifework was published by Huacheng Publishing House in Guangzhou. This series is widely available in Mainland bookstores. It includes short stories, essays, diary entries, and Crystal Boys. A lengthy preface in Volume 1 was penned by Ouyang Tzu.

Pai was born Muslim, attended missionary Catholic schools and embraced Buddhist meditation practices in the United States.
