= Chen Xue (writer) =

Taiwanese writer (born 1970)

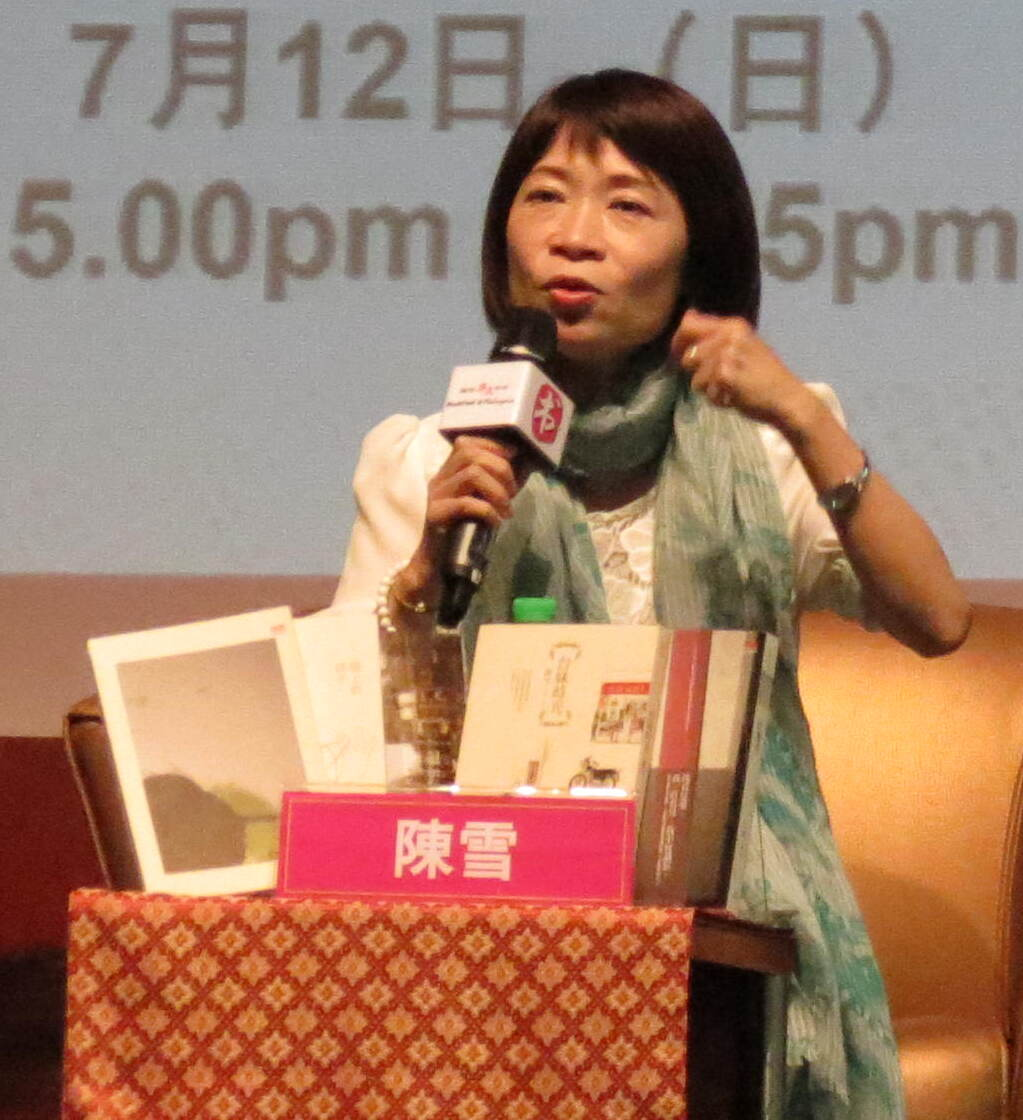
- Chen in 2015
- Native name: 陳雪
- Born: Chen Yaling; 1970 (age 55–56) Taichung
- Occupation: Writer
- Language: Chinese
- Citizenship: Taiwan
- Genre: Queer literature
- Literary movement: Tongzhi literature
- Notable works: Enü shu (Chinese: 惡女書, 'Book of a Demon')

Chen Xue (Chinese: 陳雪; born 1970) is a Taiwanese writer. She is the author of Enü shu (惡女書; lit. 'Book of a Demon'), a collection of short stories published in 1995 that has become considered a classic of tongzhi literature recognising the lives of Taiwanese LGBTQ+ communities.

== Biography ==
Born Chen Yaling (陳雅玲) in 1970 in Taichung, she was awarded a Bachelor of Arts degree in Chinese from National Central University in 1993. Her first book was published in 1995. It is Enü shu (Chinese: 惡女書; lit. "Book of a Demon"), a collection of four short stories, the best known of which is Xunzhao tianshi de chibang (尋找天使遺失的翅膀, "In Search of the Lost Wings of Angels"), which has become a classic of tongzhi literature. The story has been anthologised and translated to English twice, by Patricia Stieber and Fran Martin. Her story Venus is written from a transgender perspective.

A lesbian, Chen is also famous for kissing her partner on the cover of the queer magazine LEZS. She is also a human rights activist, speaking on LGBTQ+ rights in Taiwan.

== Awards and recognition ==
Chen is a novelist, as well as a short story writer and her 2009 work The Possessed was nominated for multiple literary awards in Taiwan.

In 2004, Hong Kong director Yan Yan Mak adapted one of her short stories (蝴蝶, “Butterfly”) for the cinema. Twice nominated at the Golden Horse Film Festival that year, the film Butterfly subsequently won only one award at the 2005 Hong Kong Film Awards. The plot centres on a love affair between a teenage girl and a married woman.

== Reception ==
With Chi Ta-wei, Lucifer Hung and Qiu Miaojin, her work is viewed as that of a “new generation of queer authors” from Taiwan. One of the most prominent voices, Chen's works focus on a range of themes, in addition to those of LGBTQ+ people. Her 2019 novel Fatherless City (無父之城), however, has a "putatively straight premise". Many works address themes of family and parenthood, as well as home and exile.

== Selected works ==
- Enü shu (惡女書, “Book of a Demon”), 1995
- Fatherless City (無父之城), 2019
