= List of film festivals in China =

The following is a list of film festivals in China.

- BigScreen Festival, first held in 2004 in Padua, Italy, but now held in the city of Kunming
- Hong Kong National Film Festival
- Beijing College Student Film Festival
- Beijing Independent Film Festival
- Beijing International Film Festival
- Beijing Queer Film Festival
- Changchun Film Festival
- China International New Media Short Film Festival
- CINEMQ, Shanghai
- Guangzhou International Documentary Film Festival
- Hainan International Film Festival
- Hong Kong Asian Film Festival
- Hong Kong Independent Short Film and Video Awards (IFVA)
- Hong Kong International Film Festival
- Hong Kong Lesbian & Gay Film Festival
- Huading Awards
- Macau International Movie Festival
- Pingyao International Film Festival
- Shanghai International Film Festival
- ShanghaiPRIDE Film Festival
- Shanghai Queer Film Festival (from September 2017)
- Mountain Lu International Romantic Film Festival
