= Yongjing railway station =

Railway station in Changhua, Taiwan

Yongjing 永靖車站
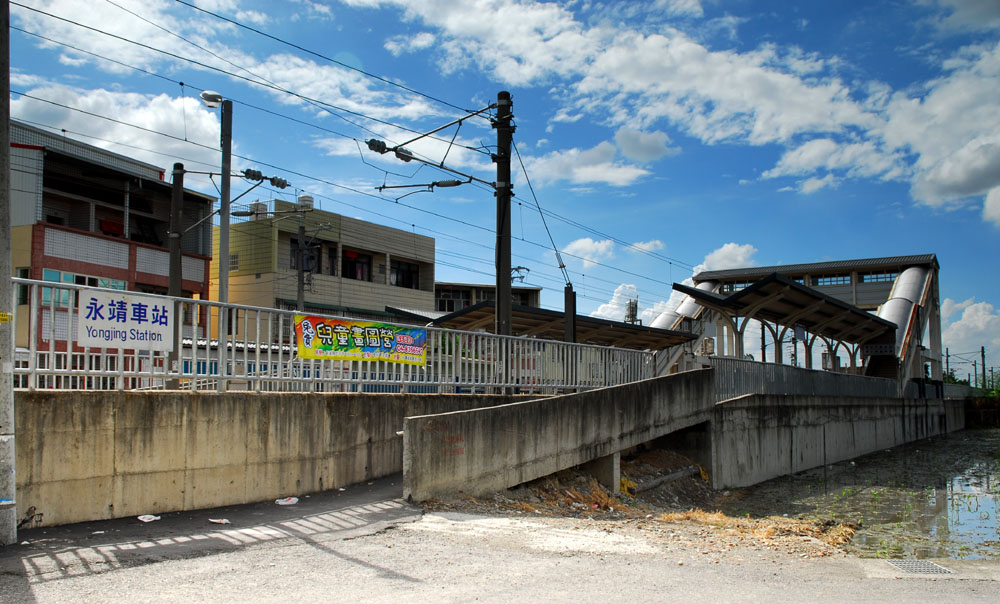

General information
- Location: Yongjing, Changhua County, Taiwan
- Coordinates: 23°55′41.4″N 120°34′18.2″E
- System: Railway station
- Owner: Taiwan Railway
- Operator: Taiwan Railway
- Line: Western Trunk line
- Train operators: Taiwan Railway

History
- Opened: 24 October 1958

Passengers
- 1,135 daily (2024)

Services
| Preceding station | Taiwan Railway | Following station |
|---|---|---|
| Yuanlin towards Keelung | Western Trunk line | Shetou towards Kaohsiung |
Location

Yongjing (Chinese: 永靖車站; pinyin: Yǒngjìng Chēzhàn) is a railway station on Taiwan Railway West Coast line located in Yongjing Township, Changhua County, Taiwan. Despite the name of the station, Yongjing railway station is not close to Central Yongjing.

== Structure ==
Yongjing Station has two side platforms.

== Around the station ==
- Yusan Hall

== See also ==
- List of railway stations in Taiwan
