= Crystal Boys =

Book by Pai Hsien-yung

- Paperback cover
- Author: Pai Hsien-yung
- Original title: 孽子
- Language: Chinese
- Genre: Fiction
- Publisher: Yuan Jing
- Publication date: 1983
- Publication place: Taiwan
- Media type: Print
- Pages: 397 p.
- OCLC: 818956496

Crystal Boys (孽子, pinyin: Nièzǐ, "sons of sin") is a novel written by author Pai Hsien-yung (aka Bai Xianyong 白先勇) first published in 1983 in Taiwan.

== Background ==
Set in the early 1970s, this is a coming-of-age story of a gay teenager struggling to find his place in Taiwan's dizzyingly diverse society at the time.

Nièzǐ means literally "sinful sons" or "sons of sin", but it may also be an allusion to a passage in Mencius in which "friendless officials and concubine's sons" (孤臣孽子) reach positions of power because they have learned to live with a dangerous status.

There is a reference to You Xian Ku in the chapter "Wandering into a Den of Fairies.".

== Plot ==
Thrown out by his father for being caught in a homosexual act at his high school lab, A-qing tries to sleep on a park bench before he is taken home by Grandpa Gus, who tells him the stories of some of the gay men cruising New Park. He quickly falls in with three other teenagers surviving by selling their bodies—Little Jade, Wu Min, and Mousey—and, like them, is taken under Chief Yang's wings. A tall, emaciated man breaks down sobbing after making love with A-qing one night, saying his father, who had banished him to New York, died five days ago but he couldn't attend the funeral because he wasn't wanted. A-qing later learns the man is none other than Dragon Prince, who killed the legendary Phoenix Boy years ago. Dragon Prince begs A-qing to move in with him, but all A-qing could think of is a scene from The Return of Frank Jones, of two outlaws sinking into quicksand together.

Feeling duty-bound to tell his mother of Buddy's recent death, he finds her lying in a filthy room looking more like a wizened girl baby than the pretty young woman of his memory. After he blurts out that Buddy is dead, she accuses him and his father of murdering her favorite son. He learns on returning weeks later that she has died. He retrieves her ashes, takes the urn home, and leaves a note for his father. Trying to fill the void left by his beloved brother, he befriends a boy who flees in disgust when A-qing absent-mindedly embraces him from behind. His quixotic attempt to take responsibility for a retarded child also comes to grief.

A police raid has swept up the men cruising at New Park but A-qing and his friends avoid jail time thanks to Papa Fu's intervention. Led by Chief Yang, they go to thank him at his house. Papa Fu tells Chief Yang that next time the young men get into trouble, he may not be able to help them again, for the people he knows in the police force are retired or dead, whereupon Chief Yang reveals he has secured financing to open a tavern that could keep the boys gainfully employed. Accessible through an inconspicuous front door in the busiest section of town, the tavern—named Cozy Nest—is an instant success. College students and young professionals feel comfortable dropping in.

Chief Yang sends A-qing to take care of Papa Fu after his heart attack. It turns out Papa Fu and Dragon Prince's father were once comrades-in-arms. When Dragon Prince comes to pay his respect, Papa Fu is impatient with his complaints of having been banished, and wondered if the young man has tried to imagine the pain his father suffered. Papa Fu later confides to A-qing that his own son committed suicide by shooting himself through the mouth just before he was scheduled to be court-marshaled for homosexuality. He had called long-distanced begging his father to let him come home to explain himself but was sternly cut off. For a long time afterward, Papa Fu had a recurring nightmare of a face white as paper, the eyes wide with panic, the mouth opening and closing as if begging for something but no words come out. It wasn't till he woke up one night from seeing the same face drenched in blood, that he realized the face belonged to a young solder whom he had ordered shot for having been caught making love with an older solder.

A-qing is invited by Mr. Yu, a college instructor and a regular customer at Cozy Nest, to a late night snack, and spends the night at Mr. Yu's apartment. When this decent and congenial man put his arm around A-qing, however, he finds himself shrinking back and starts to cry, ashamed of having been intimate with countless strangers under sordid circumstances. Waking up the second morning, A-qing declines Mr. Yu's lunch invitation and wanders off to his former high school, figuring it's Saturday and no-one would recognize him with his jeans and long hair anyway. He enjoys a pick-up game on the basketball court with some junior high students and walks one of his teammates home. When the iced drink vendor recognizes A-qing, he is, in fact, quite pleased.

Cozy Nest is forced to close after an article describing the tavern in salacious terms appears in a tabloid. But all is not lost, for A-qing and Little Jade have acquired marketable bartending skills, and Little Jade has found a patron who agrees to hire him as galley help on one of his ships operating between Taiwan and Japan.

As Papa Fu lays dying, A-qing stays by his side, performing all the intimate tasks that a filial son might be called upon to do for a very sick man. He and his friends brings the body home from the hospital, lovingly wash off the encrusted excrement before dressing him and placing him into a casket. On his turn at the vigil to sit by the casket in the candle-lit living room, A-qing struggles to stay awake. Soon, the photograph of the deceased by the casket and that of his son hanging on the wall merge with A-qing's recent memory of Papa Fu and Dragon Prince chatting. He sees Dragon Prince's mouth opening and closing but no sound comes out, and when Papa Fu turns around to face him, the face is that of his own furious father. Dragon Prince arrives at the tomb just as A-qing and his friends lower the casket into the ground. They watch him as he places a bouquet of chrysanthemum on the casket, prostrates himself, and howls like a wild best. Following his example, they also prostrate themselves, each grieving partly for his own father.

Little Jade is last heard of being the toast of gay bars in Tokyo, methodically going through phone books and visiting Shiseido offices looking for his father. Wu Min has moved back with his fickle patron. Mousey is outraged at being thrown in with armed robbers at the reform school, but enjoys learning how to dye fabrics. A-qing takes home a boy he finds sleeping on a bench at New Park.

== Characters ==
- A-qing 阿青: the main character, expelled by his high school and thrown out by his father for homosexuality.
- A-qing's father: a military man decorated for his heroic feats fighting the Japanese but subsequently stripped of his credentials for having survived capture by the Communist. He has had high hope that A-qing would vindicate his honor by building a brilliant military career.
- Buddy 弟娃: A-Qing's younger brother who has died of pneumonia.
- A-qing's mother: a woman with a perpetual panic in her eyes who, after a brutal beating by her much older husband, deserts him and their sons to join an itinerant song and dance troop.
- Grandpa 郭老: a retired photographer who keeps a photo album of the young gay men cruising in New Park.
- Little Jade 小玉: a sharp-witted, sweet-tongued charmer whose father, a Shiseido salesman, has decamped to Japan before he was born. He dreams of uniting him with his adoring mother, whom Little Jade could only visit when her trucker husband is away.
- Mousey 老鼠: a petty thief who lives with his abusive older brother in a brothel where the latter is employed as bodyguard.
- Wu Min 吴敏: friend of A-qing, Little Jade, and Mousey, devoted to a fickle and cynical patron; for having provided him with the only stable environment he has ever known. His father is an inveterate gambler imprisoned for drug dealing.
- Chief Yang 楊師傅: the self-appointed guardian and sometime pimp of A-qing, Little Jade, Mousey, and Wu Min.
- Lord Sheng 盛公: a flamboyant movie producer who throws raucous parties behind drawn curtains for the gay men.
- Papa Fu 傅老爺子: a retired military officer and industrialist who has taken an interest in helping orphans and young gay men.
- Dragon Prince 王夔龙, 龍子: the son of a very high-ranking military officer who has recently returned to Taiwan from years living in New York, having been banished there by his father after he stabbed Phoenix Boy to death in a fit of rage.
- Phoenix Boy 阿鳳: a wild orphan who has become a legendary figure among the denizens of New Park,

== Cultural impact ==
Crystal Boys was the first Chinese novel to focus on the gay community in Taiwan. The novel brought LGBT issues in Taiwan to mainstream attention and is widely seen as a major contributor to Taiwan's legalization of same-sex marriage in 2019, becoming the first country in Asia to do so.

== Translations ==
- In 1988, this novel went into circulation in China, where there are eight editions. A French translation, Garcons de Crystal, by Andre Levy, was published by Paris Flammarion in 1995, and reprinted by Paris Philippe Picquier in 2003. A German translation Treffpunkt Lotussee, appeared in 1995. The novel has also been translated into Italian, Dutch, Polish, Japanese, Korean, and Vietnamese.
- The English translation of the novel by Howard Goldblatt, titled Crystal Boys, was published by Gay Sunshine Press in 1990, and reprinted by the Chinese University of Hong Kong in 2017.

== Adaptations ==
=== Film ===
A film based on the novel titled Outcasts was released in Taiwan in 1986.

=== Television series ===
In 2003, the novel was adapted by Taiwan Public Television Service Foundation into a television series of the same name. It starred Fan Chi-wei (范植偉 as A-qing), Tony Yang (楊佑寧 as Zhao Ying), Joseph Chang (張孝全 as Wu Min), and Wu Huai Zhong (吴怀中 as Mousey).

== See also ==
- List of television shows with gay characters
- Queer culture
- Homosexuality in China
