= Kevin Chen (writer) =

Kevin Chen 陳思宏
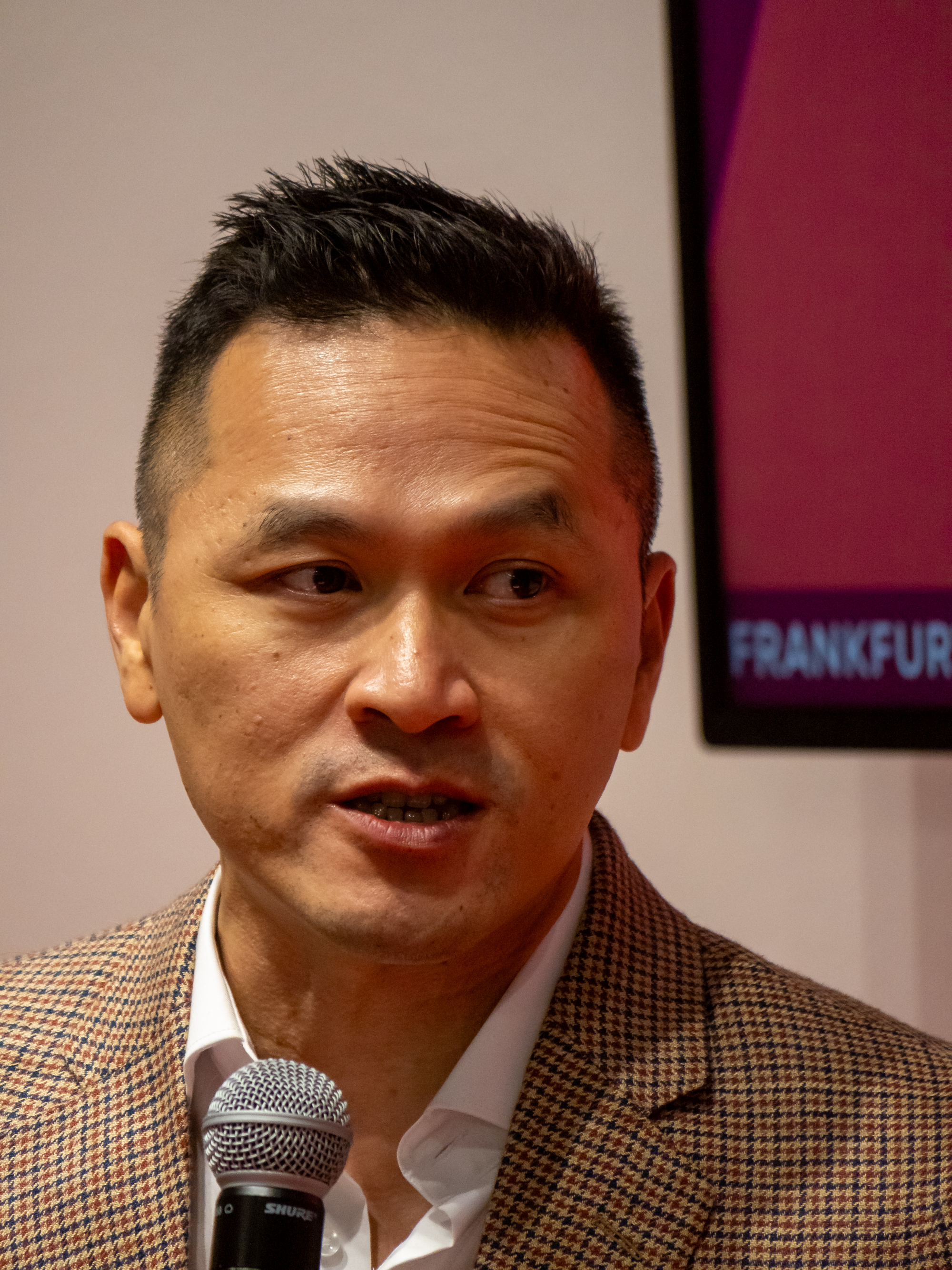
- Chen in 2025
- Born: February 27, 1976 (age 50); Yongjing, Changhua, Taiwan
- Education: Fu Jen Catholic University; National Taiwan University
- Writing career
- Language: Mandarin, Taiwanese Hokkien, German, English
- Notable work: Ghost Town
- Notable awards: 44th Golden Tripod Award for Best Literature Book; 2020 Taiwan Literature Awards Golden Grand Laurel Award

Kevin Chen (Chinese: 陳思宏; Chen Shih-hung; born 1976) is a Taiwanese novelist, journalist, translator, and actor based in Berlin.

== Early life and education ==
Chen was born on 27 February 1976 in Yongjing Township, Changhua County in Taiwan. He is the youngest of nine children.

Chen's parents were farmers and discouraged him from reading and writing despite his early interest in literature. However, he was encouraged by teachers in junior and senior high school to pursue his passion for language, and he began to submit to student writing competitions.

In 2004, Chen moved to Berlin, continuing to write while also working as an actor and translator. He also served on many occasions as a Chinese-language interpreter for the Berlin International Film Festival.

== Personal life ==
Chen is gay and often writes about queer sexuality in his fiction. He has registered life partnership with his partner of many years in Germany.

== Bibliography ==
=== Novels ===
- 《態度》（2007, INK Literary)
- 《鬼地方》(2019, Mirror Fiction)
  - Ghost Town (2022, Europa, translated by Darryl Sterk)
- 《佛羅里達變形記》(2020, Mirror Fiction)
- 《樓上的好人》(2022, Mirror Fiction)
- 《第六十七隻穿山甲》(2023, Mirror Fiction)
- 《社頭三姊妹》(2025, Mirror Fiction)

=== Short stories ===
- 《指甲長花的世代》（2002年，麥田）
- 《營火鬼道》（2003年，麥田）
- 《去過敏的三種方法》（2015年，九歌）

=== Essays ===
- 《叛逆柏林》（2011年，健行）
- 《柏林繼續叛逆：寫給自由》（2014年，健行）
- 《第九個身體》（2018年，九歌）
