= The Membranes (novel) =

1995 novel by Chi Ta-wei

- Author: Chi Ta-wei
- Original title: 膜
- Translator: Ari Larissa Heinrich
- Language: Chinese language
- Genre: Speculative fiction
- Publisher: Chinese version: 聯經出版; English version: Columbia University Press
- Publication date: 1996
- Publication place: Taiwan
- English publication date: 2021

The Membranes is a novel written by Chi Ta-wei, and published in 1996 in Taiwan. It is considered a classic of Taiwanese queer speculative fiction. It portrays a future in which humanity has retreated to cities at the bottom of the ocean, after the ozone layer disappeared, rendering the scorching surface unlivable. The story follows Momo, a young dermal care technician who is famous for her dermal treatments for celebrities.

According to the translator Ari Larissa Heinrich, The Membranes was written after the martial law in Taiwan ended, which caused an influx of foreign films, literature and music from the rest of the world to influence a whole generation of Taiwanese writers and artists. Like many intellectuals of his time, Ta-wei was inspired by this cultural change, and Momo drops all kinds of references to works of literature from all around the world.

The author has said that the idea for the novel came to him when his partner, a graduate student in atmospheric science, told him about ozone depletion.

== Summary ==
Momo is a 30 year old dermal care technician who lives a solitary life in the fictional T City. She performs dermal treatments for the wealthy people of the city, and lives in her studio with a dog named Andy. At the beginning of the story, Momo receives an email of her mother, who she hasn't had any contact with for the past 20 years, asking to visit her.

When she was a young girl, Momo was very sick and her mother acquired an android who would serve as "spare parts" for her, because she needed to have a lot of organs replaced. Momo quickly grew infatuated with the cyborg, and was devastated after the surgery took her friend away from her. We learn this in a series of flashbacks while Momo awaits her mother's arrival.

When Momo's mother finally visits her, Momo steals the password to her work computer and discovers a series of video files inside, which are very similar to her own memories, as if recorded from her own eyes. Shortly after this, we discover that Momo's life has been a simulation for the past 20 years, and that she's just a brain controlling a highly advanced robot in a factory. At the end, her mother collects her daughter's brain, and the novel ends with both of them in Venice, still in a simulation inside Momo's conscience.
