= Qiu Miaojin =

Taiwanese novelist

Qiu Miaojin 邱妙津
- 邱妙津
- Born: 29 May 1969; Changhua County, Taiwan
- Died: 24 June 1995 (aged 26); Paris, France
- Education: National Taiwan University; University of Paris VIII
- Occupations: Novelist, short story writer, filmmaker
- Writing career
- Language: Chinese (Taiwan)
- Period: 1989–1995
- Genres: Literary fiction, autobiography
- Notable works: Notes of a Crocodile, Last Words from Montmartre
- Notable awards: China Times Literature Award, Central Daily News Short Story Prize, United Literature Association Award
- Movement: LGBT literature

Chinese name
- Traditional Chinese: 邱妙津
- Simplified Chinese: 邱妙津
Transcriptions
Standard Mandarin
- Hanyu Pinyin: Qiū Miàojīn
- Wade–Giles: Chiu¹ Miao⁴-chin¹

Qiu Miaojin (Chinese: 邱妙津; 29 May 1969 – 25 June 1995), also romanized as Chiu Miao-chin, was a Taiwanese writer, journalist, and filmmaker. She is best known for her 1994 novel Notes of a Crocodile and her 1996 novel Last Words from Montmartre, published posthumously. Qiu's works are "frequently cited as classics", and her unapologetic representation of the lesbian experience has had a profound influence worldwide. Qiu's writing laid significant groundwork for the terminology and discussion of lesbianism within modern Chinese language and popular culture.

== Biography ==
Originally from Changhua County in western Taiwan, Qiu attended the prestigious Taipei First Girls' High School and National Taiwan University, where she graduated with a major in psychology. She worked as a counselor and later as a reporter at the weekly magazine The Journalist. In 1994, she moved to Paris where she pursued graduate studies in clinical psychology and feminism at University of Paris VIII, studying with philosopher Hélène Cixous.

Qiu died by suicide at age 26. Most accounts suggest that she stabbed herself with a kitchen knife.

== Writing ==
Qiu Miaojin's writing is influenced by the non-narrative structures of avant-garde and experimental film as well as European and Japanese literary modernisms. Her novels contain camera angles and ekphrasis in response to European art cinema, including allusions to directors such as Andrei Tarkovsky, Theo Angelopoulos, Derek Jarman, and Jean-Luc Godard. During her time in Paris, Qiu directed a short film titled Ghost Carnival. In 2021 the original 16mm film was found in the Taiwan Film and Audiovisual Institute's archives and digitized. Currently, her works as a filmmaker are in the collection of the Museum of Modern Art, New York.

Her best-known work is Notes of a Crocodile, for which she was posthumously awarded the China Times Literature Award in 1995. The main character's nickname, Lazi, was later adopted as a slang term for "lesbian" in Chinese. Notes of a Crocodile was published in 1994, amid a Taiwanese media frenzy surrounding lesbians, including an incident in which a TV journalist secretly filmed patrons at a lesbian bar without their consent, resulting in some suicides, and the group suicide of two girls, rumored to have been lesbians, from the elite high school attended by several characters in the novel and by Qiu herself. Along with her final work before her death, Last Words from Montmartre, the novel has been widely described as "a cult classic."

Last Words From Montmartre is an epistolary novel that comprises 20 letters that can be read in any order, drawing on the notion of musical indeterminacy. Its prose appears to "blur distinctions between personal confession and lyric aphorism" according to a review in Rain Taxi. Dated between 27 April 1995, and 17 June 1995, about a week before the author killed herself, the letters begin with the dedication: "For dead little Bunny, and Myself, soon dead." It has been described as a work of relational art and noted for the required presence of the reader, "a 'you' to narrate to" that is a signature of Qiu's works.

== Legacy ==
Qiu has been recognized as a literary national treasure and counterculture icon, as well as described as a "martyr" in the movement for LGBT rights in Taiwan. Her works are taught in high schools and colleges in Taiwan and have "become a literary model for many aspiring writers". With Chen Xue, Lucifer Hung, and Chi Ta-wei, her work is viewed as that of a “new generation of queer authors” from Taiwan.

Luo Yijun's book Forgetting Sorrow (遣悲懷) was written in her memory. Moreover, Taiwanese writer Li Kotomi explicitly cites Qiu's Notes of a Crocodile as an inspiration for her 2017 novel Solo Dance. Queer Sinophone scholar Fran Martin writes:

Qiu Miaojin is Taiwan's best-known lesbian author. ... Qiu's fiction has sometimes been accused of being unduly 'negative' about lesbian experience; however, her status as a public lesbian and intellectual and the emotional honesty and intensity of her writing make her a figure of enduring significance for lesbian readers of Chinese everywhere.

— Martin, Fran (2006-03-01). "MIAOJIN, QIU". In Gerstner, David A. (ed.). Routledge International Encyclopedia of Queer Culture. Routledge.

Qiu Miaojin's life, work, and circumstances of her suicide have been made by Evans Chan into a documentary film, Love and Death in Montmartre 蒙馬特之愛與死, with the participation of Lai Xiangyin 賴香吟, award-winning novelist and Qiu's literary executor. The film originated from a 50-min short, Death in Montmartre 蒙馬特 · 女書, commissioned and broadcast by RTHK in 2017. Chan later expanded it into the full-length Love and Death in Montmartre, which was premiered as a Best Film nominee at the Hamburg International Queer Film Festival in 2019. Subsequently, the San Diego Asian Film Festival presented its US premiere in 2020. Hélène Cixous described the Evans Chan film as “fascinating” and “marvelous,” with Qiu evoked as “a moving apparition in search of lost love.”

== Bibliography ==
=== Novels ===
- Lonely Crowd《寂寞的群眾》(1990)
- A Carnival of Ghosts《鬼的狂歡》(1991)
- Notes of a Crocodile《鱷魚手記》(1994) - translated by Bonnie Huie (New York Review Books Classics, 2017)
- Last Words from Montmartre 《蒙馬特遺書》(1996) - translated by Ari Larissa Heinrich (New York Review Books Classics, 2014)

=== Short stories ===
- "Cage"《囚徒》(1988) - translated by Shengchi Hsu (Strangers Press, 2024)
- "Platonic Hair"《柏拉图之发》(1990) - translated by Fran Martin in Angelwings: Contemporary Queer Fiction from Taiwan (University of Hawai'i Press, 2003)

== See also ==
- Écriture féminine
- Post-structural feminism
- Queer theory
