= Yongjing, Changhua =

Rural township in Changhua County, Taiwan

Coordinates: 23°55′20.2″N 120°32′08.0″E

Yongjing Township 永靖鄉
- Rural township
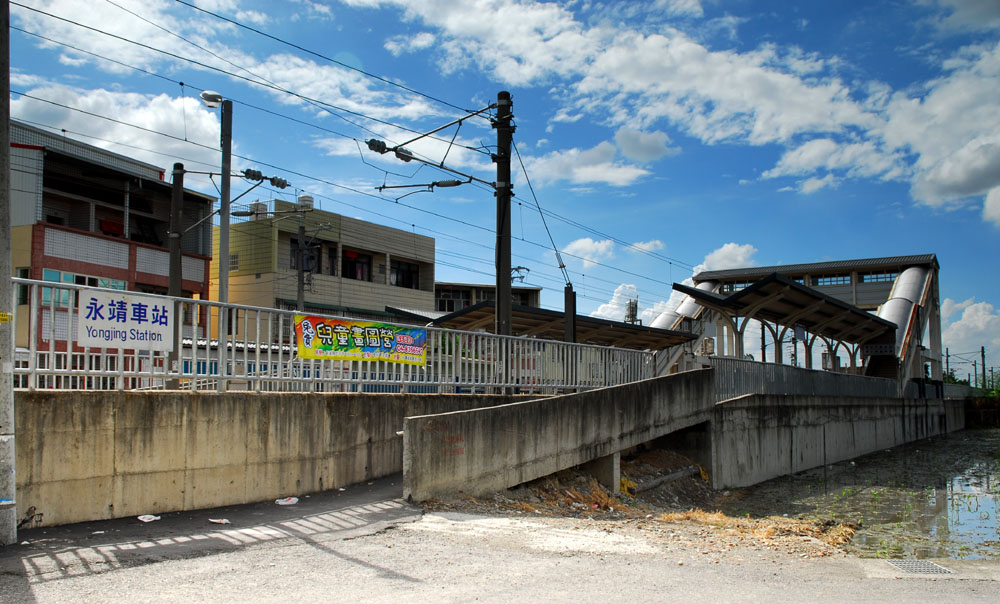

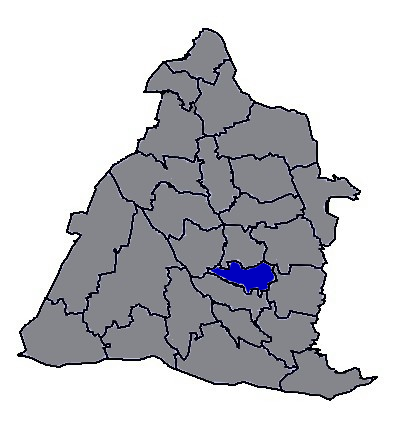
- Yongjing Township in Changhua County
- Location: Changhua County, Taiwan

Area
  - Total: 21 km^{2} (8.1 sq mi)

Population (March 2023)
  - Total: 35,365
  - Density: 1,700/km^{2} (4,400/sq mi)

Yongjing Township
- Chinese: 永靖鄉
- Hanyu Pinyin: Yǒngjìng Xiāng
- Wade–Giles: Yung^{3}-ching^{4} Hsiang^{1}
- Pha̍k-fa-sṳ: Yún-tshìn-hiông
- Hokkien POJ: Éng-chēng-hiong

Yongjing Township is a rural township in Changhua County, Taiwan.

== Geography ==
It has a population total of 35,365 and an area of 20.64 square kilometres (7.97 sq mi) It is the third smallest township in Changhua County after Xianxi and Beidou.

== Administrative divisions ==
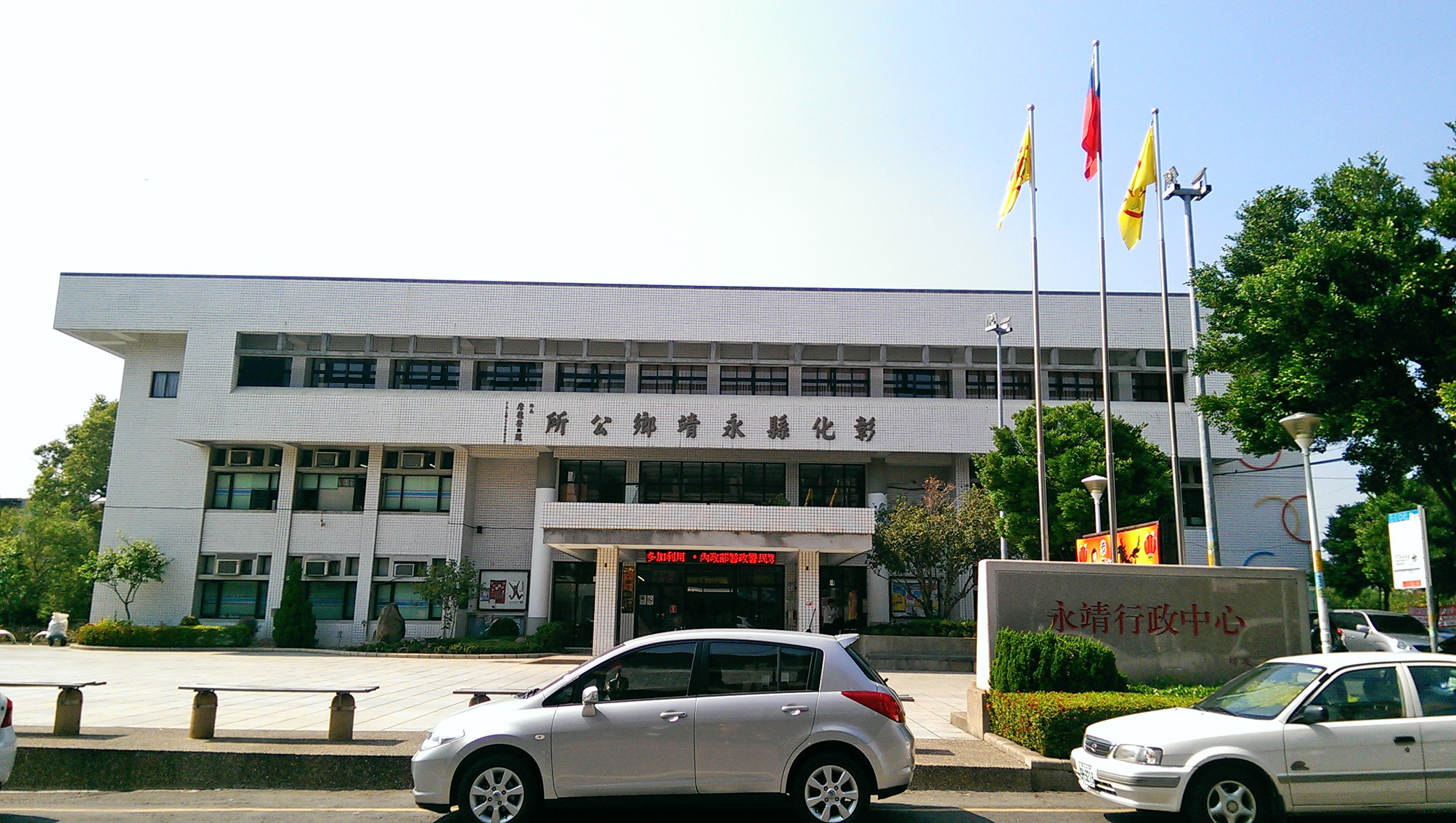
Yongjing Township Office

Villages of the township are Dongning (東寧村), Duao (獨鰲村), Dunhou (敦厚村), Fuxing (福興村), Fuzun (浮圳村), Gangxi (港西村), Guangyun (光雲村), Hulian (瑚璉村), Lunmei (崙美村), Lunzi (崙子村), Nangang (湳港村), Nanqi (湳墘村), Sifang (四芳村), Tongan (同安村), Tongren (同仁村), Wubian (五汴村), Wufu (五福村), Xinzhuang (新莊村), Yongbei (永北村), Yongdong (永東村), Yongnan (永南村), Yongxi (永西村), Yongxing (永興村), and Zhuzi (竹子村).

== Tourist attractions ==
- Yusan Hall

== Transportation ==
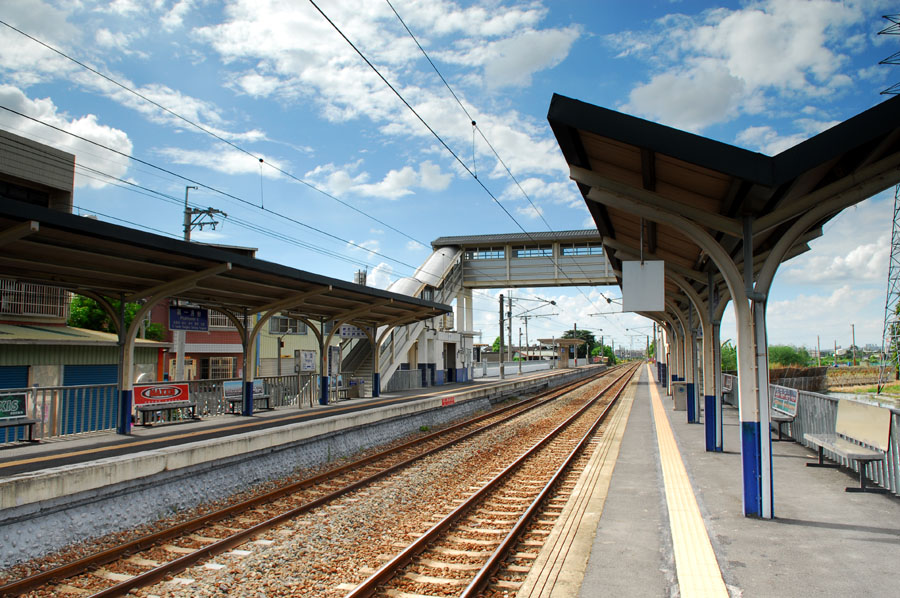
Yongjing Station

- Taiwan Railway Yongjing Station: Although there is a train station in Yongjing, it's very distant from the central part of the township.

== Notable natives ==
- Kevin Chen, Taiwanese novelist, journalist, translator and actor.
