= Yan Yan Mak =

Hong Kong film director

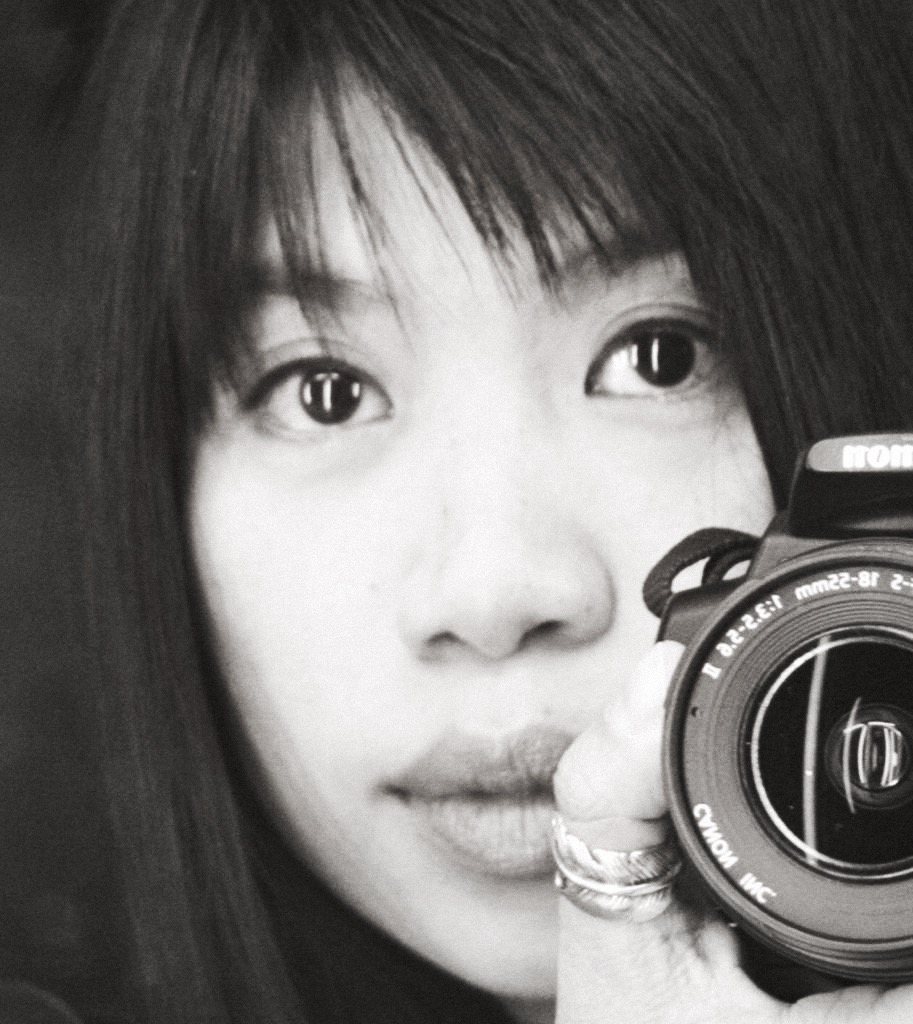
- Mak at the 2010 Hong Kong Asian Film Festival
- Born: Hong Kong

Chinese name
- Traditional Chinese: 麥婉欣
- Simplified Chinese: 麦婉欣
Transcriptions
Standard Mandarin
- Hanyu Pinyin: Mài Wǎnxīn
Yue: Cantonese
- Jyutping: Maak6 Jyun2 Jan1

Yan Yan Mak (Man Yuen-Yan) is a Hong Kong–based award-winning film director.

== Biography ==
She graduated from the Hong Kong Academy for Performing Arts; as a student, Yan Yan worked for the film industry as an assistant director, production manager, art director, and wardrobe designer. Her graduation short film Snapshots won the Distinguish Award at the International Short Film & Video Awards of Hong Kong in 1998.

After directing several short dramas for Radio Television Hong Kong, she established her own production company Dragonfly J Ltd., to make her film. Her debut feature film, Gege (Brother), although using a very limited budget, a small crew, and a non-actors cast, was awarded the FIPRESCI Award at the 25th Hong Kong International Film Festival, the POVEGLIA Award at the International Week of Film Critics of the 58th Venice Film Festival, the Woosuk Award at Jeonju International Film Festival in South Korea, as well as the Ecumenical Jury Prize at the International Film Festival Bratislava and Fribourg International Film Festival 2001.

Her second film Butterfly, based on a short story by Chen Xue, was chosen as the Opening Film at Venice Film Festival Critics Week (La Biennale di Venezia), the Hong Kong Gay & Lesbian Film and Video Film Festival 2004 and Créteil International Women's Film Festival in France 2005. The film won the Best Feature award at the Paris Lesbian and Feminist Film Festival. Tian Yuan was awarded as the Best New Artist at the Hong Kong Film Awards in 2005. The film was also nominated at the Taiwan Golden Horse Awards in 2004 for Best Adapted Screenplay (Yan Yan Mak) and Best Supporting Actor (Eric Kot). Butterfly has been screened at the Hong Kong Retrospective, the Hong Kong Gay & Lesbian Film Festival 2019.

Since 2005, after becoming a collaborator with Hong Kong Cantopop singer Denise Ho, Yan Yan has produced numerous music videos, music short films, and TV Commercials. The Scarlet Robe won the Best Drama in BigScreen Festival, China 2007. They finished their first feature-length film The Decameron (a documentary about madness, under the music project "10 Days in the Madhouse") in 2009. Recently, Yan Yan has collaborated with Denise Ho as her concert producer and director in Reimagine Hong Kong (2015), Macpherson Woods (2015), Dear Friend, (2016) and On The Pulse Of Hocc Live 2018. She had also produced 'Galactica', a concert by a singer Endy Chow Kwok Yin in 2017/18.

Yan Yan completed another feature Merry-Go-Round (Dong Feng Po) in 2010 in Hong Kong. It was elected as the Best Chinese-Language Film by Film Critics China, nominated at The Hong Kong Film Award 2011 for the Best Cinematography Award, and won the Best Film Song Award ("Here to Stay" by Jun Kung), won the Best Actress (Ella Koon) and the Best Actor (Teddy Robin) at Australia Golden Koala Film Festival.

Her other feature work, The Great War (2013), a documentary about Grasshopper x Softhard Concert 2012, has had its Gala premiere at the New York Asian Film Festival 2013 as also selected as the closing-film of the film festival.

Yan Yan's latest work, 'Sound Of Silence' (SOS), is the Closing Film of the 6th Hong Kong Kids International Film Festival 2022 (KIFF) and won numerous awards in film festivals worldwide.

== Awards and honours ==
- Short film Snapshots 了了 won the Distinguish Award at the International Short Film & Video Awards of Hong Kong in 1998.
- Advertising work 'Numbers' for The Women's Foundation has been awarded in the Film Craft section of AD STARS 2019 (Korea).

== Filmography ==
Feature length, as Producer, Director, and Scriptwriter:

- 2001 Brother (Gege) 哥哥
- 2004 Butterfly (Hudie) 蝴蝶
- 2006 August Story (Director’s Cut) 八月的故事
- 2008 The Decameron (Documentary) 十日談
- 2010 Merry-Go-Round (Dong Fung Po) 東風破
- 2013 The Great War (Da Zhan) 大戰 (Concert Documentary)
- 2022 Sound Of Silence
- 2024 Bric-A-Brac (Short)
- 2024 I Have Arrived (Short)

== Concerts ==
As Creative Director, Concert Producer, and Video Producer:

- 2015 Reimagine HK18 (HK Elizabeth Stadium)
- 2015 Reimagine Live in Macpherson Woods (MacPherson Stadium)
- 2016 Dear Friend, (Hong Kong Coliseum)
- 2017 Galactica (MacPherson Stadium)
- 2018 Galactica Rerun (MacPherson Stadium)
- 2018 On the Pulse Of HOCC Live 2018 (Hong Kong Science park)
- 2022 The Flash Back Now Party, Josie & The Uni Boys (Star Hall, KITEC)

== See also ==
- List of female film and television directors
- List of LGBT-related films directed by women
