= Wang Wen-hsing =

Taiwanese writer (1939–2023)

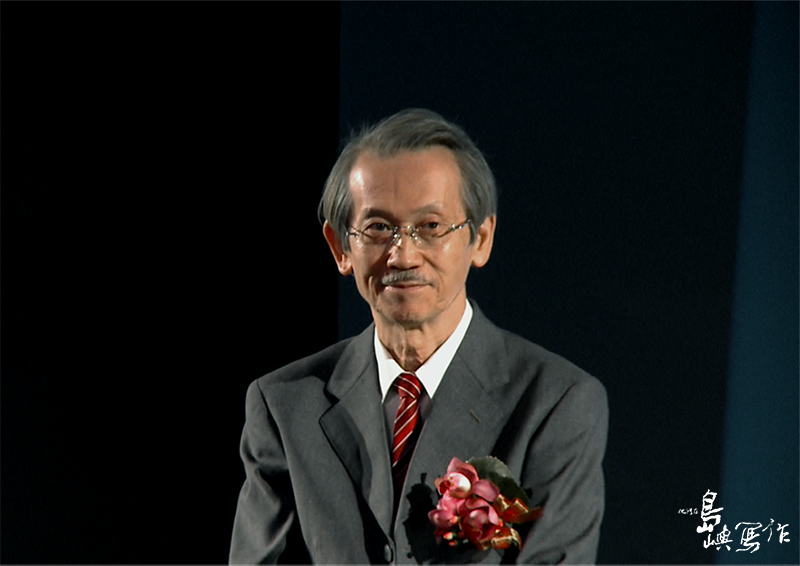

Wang Wen-hsing (Chinese: 王文興; pinyin: Wáng Wénxìng; Wade–Giles: Wang^{2} Wên^{2}-hsing^{4}; 1939 – 27 September 2023) was a Taiwanese writer.

== Life and career ==
Wang obtained a BA in Foreign Languages and Literatures from National Taiwan University and an MFA in Creative Writing from the Iowa Writers' Workshop. He returned to NTU's Department of Foreign Languages and Literatures to teach, retiring in 2005 at the rank of professor.

His first novel, Family Catastrophe (Chinese: 家變; pinyin: Jiābiàn), was published in 1972, a story about a runaway father and a son who takes over the household in his absence. He also published a novel entitled Backed Against the Sea (Chinese: 背海的人; pinyin: Bèi Hǎi de Rén) as well as several collections of short stories. In 2009, Wang received the National Award for the Arts. He was posthumously awarded a presidential citation in 2023.

Wang was born in Fuzhou, and moved from Fujian to Donggang, Pingtung in 1946, then subsequently settled in Taipei. He was married to Chen Chu-yun (陳竺筠), and died on 27 September 2023, at the age of 84.

== Bibliography of English translations ==
=== Books ===
==== Novels ====
- Family Catastrophe: A Modernist Novel. Tr. Susan Wan Dolling. Honolulu: Hawaii University Press, 2011.
- Backed Against the Sea. Trs. Ed. Gunn. Ithaca: Cornell East Asia Series, 1993.

==== Collections ====
- Endless War: Fiction and Essays by Wang Wen-hsing. Eds. Shu-ning Sciban and Fred Edwards. Ithaca: Cornell East Asia Program, 2011.

=== Uncollected short works ===
- "The Man in Black." Tr. Shen Li-fen. In Chi Pang-yuan et al., eds., An Anthology of Contemporary Chinese Literature. Taipei: National Institute for Compilation and Translation, 1975, II, 309–318.
- "Flaw." Tr. Ch'en Chu-yün. In Joseph S. M. Lau and Timothy A. Ross, eds., Chinese Stories from Taiwan: 1960–1970. New York: Columbia University Press, 1976.
- "Such a Symphony of Written Characters One Must Not Allow to Disperse." Tr. Helmut Martin. In Martin, ed., Modern Chinese Writers: Self-portrayals. Armonk, NY: M.E. Sharpe, 1992, 194–95.
