= Chi Ta-wei =

Taiwanese writer (born 1972)

Chi Ta-wei 紀大偉
- 紀大偉
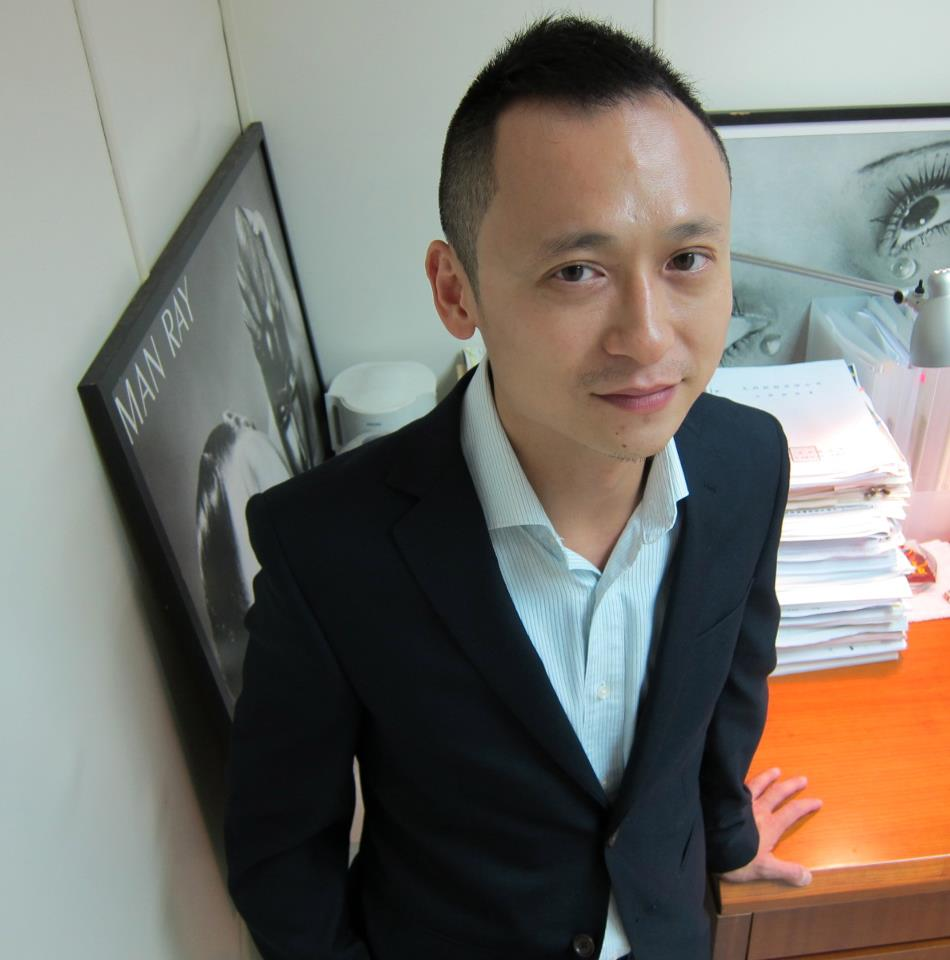
- Born: 3 February 1972 (age 54); Taichung, Taiwan
- Education: National Taiwan University (BA, MA); University of California, Los Angeles (PhD)
- Occupations: Writer of science fiction, scholar of queer theory
- Writing career
- Subjects: Queer theory, disability studies, Taiwanese literature
- Notable work: The Membranes
- Website: www.taweichi.com

Chi Ta-wei
- Traditional Chinese: 紀大偉
- Simplified Chinese: 纪大伟
Transcriptions
Standard Mandarin
- Hanyu Pinyin: Jì Dàwěi
- Wade–Giles: Chi4 Ta4-wei3
Southern Min
- Hokkien POJ: Kí Tāi-úi
- Tâi-lô: Kí Tāi-uí

Chi Ta-wei (Chinese: 紀大偉; pinyin: Jì Dàwěi; Pe̍h-ōe-jī: Kí Tāi-úi, born February 3, 1972) is a Taiwanese writer and literary scholar.

== Life ==
Chi Ta-wei was born in Taichung, Taiwan in 1972. He graduated from National Taiwan University with B.A. and M.A. degrees in foreign languages and literatures, then left Taiwan in 1999 to pursue graduate studies in the United States. He earned his Ph.D. in comparative literature from the University of California, Los Angeles, under Shu-mei Shih.

He is an associate professor of Taiwanese literature at National Chengchi University in Taipei, where he regularly offers undergraduate courses and graduate seminars on LGBT representations in East Asian literatures, and Disability Studies in the Taiwanese context.

== Career ==
Chi is known both as a writer and as a scholar of queer literature. Published in Chinese and being translated into other languages, Tongzhi wenxueshi (同志文學史, 2017), his award-winning academic monograph on the history of queer literature in Taiwan is deemed one of the most comprehensive works on LGBT literature in the Sinosphere.

With Chen Xue, and Qiu Miaojin, Chi is viewed as that of a "new generation of queer authors" from Taiwan. Chi's mostly widely read work is his short novel (or categorized as a novella), The Membranes (膜, 1996, 2011), a cyberpunk science fiction. It is known for its attention to the queer desire, the transgender subjectivity, the human-android boundaries, and the prophecy of the 21st century suffering from the climate change. According to the preface to the Chinese original, Chi spent one month finishing writing when he was a 23-year-old student in Taipei in 1995. With the popularization of the English translation by Ari Heinrich, a fellow of the Australian Academy of the Humanities, published by the Columbia University Press in 2021, the reviewers in various countries in the 21st century often comment that The Membranes, being a work from the 1990s Taiwan, is "ahead of its time" and might attract the fans of Liu Cixin's 2008 novel Three Body Problem.

According to the Columbia University Press, Ari Heinrich's translation is endorsed by Kim Stanley Robinson, the author of The Ministry for the Future, and Susan Stryker, a pioneer in transgender studies.

Among the interviews with Chi and the book reviews of The Membranes written in English, The Paris Review interview and the Los Angeles Times review are more widely circulated.

According to Fran Martin of the University of Melbourne, The Membranes is one of the first queer novels to be published in Chinese. As the novel is either dated in 1995 or in 1996, the reader might be confused which year is correct. The confusion is owing to a tradition of the literary prize hosted by The United Daily News (UDN), one of the most widely read newspapers in Taiwan. Like other winners of this prize in the 1990s, the novel was first serialized in the UDN in 1995, and later published as a book by Linking, a publisher once associated with the UDN in 1996. When it is dated as a 1995 publication, it is a publication in a newspaper. When it is dated as a 1996 publication, however, it is a published book.

The Membranes is one of the more widely translated literary works from Taiwan. It is already translated into Japanese, French, English, Italian, Korean, Danish, Finnish, and Spanish. Some of his stories are translated into Swedish. Among the numerous translations, the Italian one seems to attract especially more interviews and discussions, according to the website of the publisher of the Italian translation. Among the booktok videos done by the TikTok influencers in English and Italian, the novel is among the most often featured East Asian science fiction titles. Examples can be found easily on TikTok.

Chi is one of the more internationally visible writers from Taiwan. He was invited to give the inauguration talk at Bogform, the largest book fair in Denmark, in 2023. Some extensive interviews of Chi are available in French, Danish, and Italian.

== Works ==
=== Works in Chinese (partial) ===
- Sensory World (感官世界, 1995; ISBN 9789576152597)
- Membrane (膜, 1996; ISBN 9789570837698)
- Queer Carnival (酷兒狂歡節, 1997)
- Goodnight, Babylon: Sexuality, Dissent, and Political Reading for the Internet Generation (晚安巴比倫：網路世代的性慾、異議與政治閱讀, 1998; ISBN 9789576151453)
- Fetishism (戀物癖, 1998; ISBN 9789571327310)
- A History of Tongzhi Literature: The Invention of Taiwan (同志文學史：台灣的發明, 2017; ISBN 9789570848755)

=== Works in translation ===
- The Membranes: A Novel (English translation by Ari Larissa Heinrich, Columbia University Press, 2021; ISBN 9780231551441)
- Membrana (Italian translation by Alessandra Pezza, Add Editore, 2022; ISBN 9788867834037)
- Membrane (French translation by Gwennaël Gaffric, LGF/Le Livre de Poche, 2017; ISBN 9782253083191)
- Membraner (2023), Danish translation by Astrid Møller-Olsen
- Kalvot (Finnish translation by Rauno Sainio, Hertta Kustannus, 2024; ISBN 9789524060363)
- "A Stranger's ID" in Angelwings: Contemporary Queer Fiction from Taiwan (2003), translated by Fran Martin
- Perles (French translation of 珍珠, translated by Olivier Bialais and Gwennaël Gaffric, L'Asiathèque, 2022; ISBN 9782360572755
