= National Institute for Compilation and Translation =

Translation agency in Taiwan

- 國立編譯館; Guólì Biānyì Guǎn

Agency overview
- Formed: 14 June 1932 (in Nanking); June 1949 (in Taiwan)
- Dissolved: 30 March 2011
- Superseding agency: National Academy for Educational Research
- Headquarters: Daan, Taipei, Taiwan
- Parent agency: Ministry of Education

The National Institute for Compilation and Translation (NICT; Chinese: 國立編譯館; pinyin: Guólì Biānyì Guǎn) was the highest translation agency in the Republic of China. It is in charge of translating academic and cultural texts, as well as textbooks. It was established on 14 June 1932, in Nanking, under the Ministry of Education. It was relocated to Beibei, Sichuan during the World War II. In June 1949, the Institute followed the ROC in its relocation to the island of Taiwan, and is currently located in Taipei's Daan District.

Among its other duties, the Institute publishes textbooks considered essential for the Taiwanese college entrance exam. In addition, before private Taiwanese companies were allowed to publish textbooks, the institute was the sole supplier of textbooks for Taiwanese primary and secondary schools.

== See also ==
- Education in Taiwan
- Ministry of Education
