= List of Asian Canadian writers =

This is a list of Asian Canadian writers.

== A ==
- Ken Adachi
- Jean Marc Ah-Sen
- Neil Aitken
- Omer Aziz

== B ==
- Jane Bahk
- Sharon Bala
- Sumathy Balaram
- Shauna Singh Baldwin
- Himani Bannerji
- Kaushalya Bannerji
- Gurjinder Basran
- Arjun Basu
- Ian Bawa
- Ven Begamudré
- H. S. Bhabra
- Kirti Bhadresa
- Navtej Bharati
- Shashi Bhat
- Eddy Boudel Tan
- Randy Boyagoda

== C ==
- Romeo Candido
- Albert Casuga
- Weyman Chan
- Jolan Chang
- David Chariandy
- Katrina Chen
- Ying Chen
- Cheng Sait Chia
- Ann Y. K. Choi
- Ins Choi
- Lloyd Lee Choi
- Corinna Chong
- Denise Chong
- Kevin Chong
- Olivia Chow
- Wayson Choy
- Ook Chung
- Adrienne Clarkson
- Severn Cullis-Suzuki

== D ==
- Ranj Dhaliwal
- Vekeana Dhillon
- Farzana Doctor

== E ==
- Winnifred Eaton

== F ==
- Sui Sin Far
- Edmundo Farolan
- Musharraf Ali Farooqi
- Natasha Fatah
- Tarek Fatah
- Linda Rui Feng
- Giran Findlay Liu
- Judy Fong Bates
- Kim Fu
- Pik-Shuen Fung

== G ==
- C. E. Gatchalian
- Hollay Ghadery
- Shree Ghatage
- Rupinder Gill
- Hiromi Goto

== H ==
- Nelu Handa
- Erum Shazia Hasan
- Tara Singh Hayer
- Jeet Heer
- Catherine Hernandez
- Janet Hong
- Ava Homa
- Ray Hsu

== I ==
- Anosh Irani

== J ==
- Ramin Jahanbegloo
- Renuka Jeyapalan

== K ==
- Michael Kaan
- Surjeet Kalsey
- Hiro Kanagawa
- M. J. Kang
- Ho Ka Kei
- Srinivasan Keshav
- Rukhsana Khan
- Gloria Ui Young Kim
- Roy Kiyooka
- Tamai Kobayashi
- Joy Kogawa
- Sunil Kuruvilla
- Lydia Kwa

== L ==
- Sonnet L'Abbé
- Kama La Mackerel
- Harold Sonny Ladoo
- Larissa Lai
- Thao Lam
- Vincent Lam
- Tsering Yangzom Lama
- Evelyn Lau
- Marie-Christine Lê-Huu
- Jen Sookfong Lee
- JJ Lee
- Min Sook Lee
- Nancy Lee
- Pat Lee
- Quentin Lee
- Sky Lee
- Sook-Yin Lee
- Susur Lee
- Suvendrini Lena
- Carrianne Leung
- T. Liem
- Kat Lieu
- Roselle Lim
- Thea Lim
- Tymo Lin
- Elaine Lui
- Frieda Luk
- Nanda Lwin

== M ==
- Kyo Maclear
- Anand Mahadevan
- Rabindranath Maharaj
- Pasha Malla
- Ruth Lor Malloy
- Deepa Mehta
- Richie Mehta
- Shaun Mehta
- Roy Miki
- Rohinton Mistry
- Pavan Moondi
- Shani Mootoo
- Kim Moritsugu
- Bharati Mukherjee, now a U.S. citizen
- Sachiko Murakami

== N ==
- Leilah Nadir
- Gordon Goichi Nakayama
- Saleema Nawaz
- Zarqa Nawaz
- Carol Nguyen
- Mai Nguyen
- Nguyễn Ngọc Ngạn
- Vinh Nguyen
- Roza Nozari

== O ==
- Mona Oikawa
- Randall Okita
- Michael Ondaatje
- Mieko Ouchi
- Ruth Ozeki

== P ==
- Pal Singh Purewal
- Jivesh Parasram
- Nelofer Pazira
- Marc Perez
- Leah Lakshmi Piepzna-Samarasinha
- William Ping
- Madeh Piryonesi
- Bruce Poon Tip
- Lily Hoy Price

== Q ==
- Andy Quan

== R ==
- Deepa Rajagopalan
- Gurcharan Rampuri
- Ian Iqbal Rashid
- Anita Rau Badami
- Raheel Raza
- Ajmer Rode
- Anusree Roy
- Naben Ruthnum

== S ==
- Ziyad Saadi
- Patmeena Sabit
- Ava Maria Safai
- Michelle Sagara
- Kerri Sakamoto
- Mark Sakamoto
- Julian Samuel
- Varun Saranga
- Shyam Selvadurai
- Reva Seth
- Sheng Xue
- Sheung-King
- Tetsuro Shigematsu
- Anthony Shim
- Aki Shimazaki
- Albert Shin
- Ann Shin
- Rick Shiomi
- Vivek Shraya
- Nasir Siddiki
- Jaspreet Singh
- Lilly Singh
- Pamela Mala Sinha
- Kamal Al-Solaylee
- Mani Soleymanlou
- Veena Sud
- Sun Bo
- Moez Surani
- Rajiv Surendra
- Bindu Suresh
- David Suzuki
- Jovanni Sy

== T ==
- Proma Tagore
- Kenneth Tam
- Mariko Tamaki
- Darcy Tamayose
- Souvankham Thammavongsa
- Yasuko Thanh
- Madeleine Thien
- Kai Cheng Thom
- Kim Thúy
- Meg Tilly
- Paul Tom
- Ayelet Tsabari
- David Tsubouchi
- Ian Tuason

== U ==
- Priscila Uppal

== V ==
- Anuja Varghese
- Sugith Varughese
- M.G. Vassanji
- Padma Viswanathan
- Caroline Vu

== W ==
- Fred Wah
- Jack Wang
- Terry Watada
- Jenny Heijun Wills
- Jia Qing Wilson-Yang
- Jim Wong-Chu
- Bennet Wong
- Christina Wong
- Jack Wong
- Jan Wong
- Lindsay Wong
- Rita Wong
- Jim Wong-Chu
- Alan Woo
- Jaime Woo
- Terry Woo

== Y ==
- Bowen Yang
- David Yee
- Paul Yee
- Ying Chen
- Jean Yoon
- Mayumi Yoshida
- Nathalie Younglai

== Z ==
- Joe Zee
- Xiaowen Zeng
- Zhang Ling
- Xiran Jay Zhao

== See also ==
- Lists of Canadian writers
