= Ninomiya Sontoku =

Japanese agriculturalist

- 二宮 尊徳
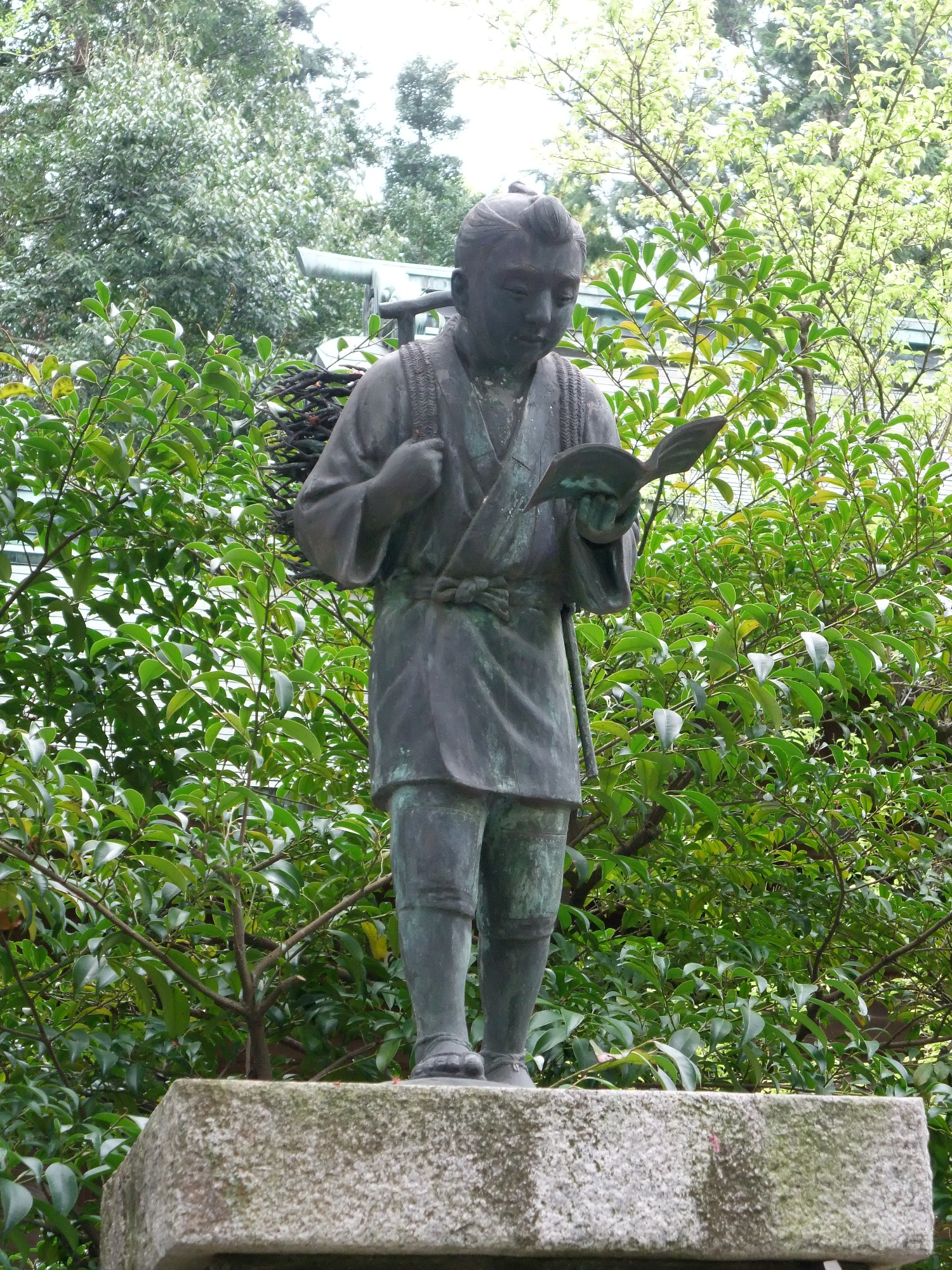
- Since the Meiji period, statues of Ninomiya have been installed in many schools in Japan as a model person of diligence and frugality.
- Born: Ninomiya Kinjirō (二宮 金次郎); September 4, 1787; Kayama, Ashigarakami District, Sagami Province
- Died: November 17, 1856; Imaichi, Shimōsa Province
- Era: Late Edo period

Ninomiya Sontoku (二宮 尊徳; September 4, 1787 – November 17, 1856), also known as Ninomiya Kinjirō (二宮 金次郎), was a Japanese agricultural reformer. His parents died when he was a teen, but through hard work and diligence, he rebuilt his fallen family at the age of 20. Later, he rebuilt approximately 600 villages and became a shogunate retainer. His ideas and actions were inherited as the Hōtokusha Movement.

== Life ==
Ninomiya Sontoku was born to a poor peasant family with a name of Kinjiro in Kayama (栢山), Ashigarakami-gun, Sagami province. His father died when he was 14 and his mother died two years later. He was then placed in his uncle's household.

While working on his uncle's land, Sontoku studied on his own. He later obtained abandoned land on his own and transformed it into agricultural land, eventually restoring his household on his own at the age of 20. He achieved considerable wealth as a landlord while in his 20s. He was then recruited to run a small feudal district which was facing considerable financial difficulty. He achieved this by reviving the local economy, particularly through agricultural development. The daimyō, hearing of his achievement, eventually recruited Sontoku to run Odawara Domain then Sagami Province (modern: central & west Kanagawa Prefecture).

It is said that during his administration a famine struck Odawara. Sontoku proposed opening up the public granaries to feed the starving populace. He was opposed by his fellow bureaucrats who reminded him that permission had to be granted by the shōgun for commoners to have access to the rice stores. In that case, Sontoku replied, no one, including the bureaucrats, could eat the public rice before getting the shōgun's approval. They quickly changed their minds and decided that, since it was an emergency, the people should be fed immediately. He was eventually entrusted with one of the shogunate's estates, which was a great honor for someone of his low origin.

His philosophy and methodology became a standard format in feudal land developmental and economic management. The name "Sontoku" was given to him for his accomplishments. After his death, the emperor awarded him with Juji'i (従四位), which was the Lower Fourth Honor under the ritsuryō rank system.

== Philosophy ==
Though he did not leave written philosophical work, his ideas were later transcribed by his disciples: Tomita Takayoshi, Fukuzumi Masae and Saitō Takayuki. Ninomiya combined three strands of traditional teachings — Buddhism, Shintōism and Confucianism — and transformed them into practical ethical principles that matured out of his experiences. He saw agriculture as the highest form of humanity because it was the cultivation of resources given by the Kami.

== Economics ==
Ninomiya Sontoku emphasized the importance of compound interest which was not well understood among samurai and peasants. He calculated the maturity of each interest rate for 100 years to show its significance by using the Japanese abacus (soroban).

He viewed agricultural village life as communal, where surpluses from one year were invested to develop further land or saved for worse years, and shared by members of the community. He was aware that developed land had a lower tax base than established agricultural land, and he was adept at financial management which he applied to his estate. He encouraged migrants from other estates and rewarded them if they successfully established an agricultural household.

He started his own financial institutions called gojoukou (五常講, ごじょうこう), which appear to be forerunners of credit unions. Each member of the village union could borrow interest-free funds for 100 days, while the entire membership shared the cost in case of default. The combination of land development, immigration, and communal finance all managed under the diligent use of abacuses was a success and became the standard methodology of economic development in feudal Japan.

== Popular culture ==
It is not uncommon to see statues of Ninomiya in or in front of Japanese schools, especially elementary schools. Typically they show him as a boy reading a book while walking and carrying firewood on his back. These statues depict popular stories that said Ninomiya was reading and studying every moment he could. The oldest remaining statue was installed in 1924 at an elementary school in Maeshiba Village, that became a district of Toyohashi, Aichi; many of the bronze statues were removed during World War II and donated for metal, but the Maeshiba statue remained, as it is concrete. Additional statues were removed starting in the 1970s, as they were perceived to set a poor example for children walking near motor vehicle traffic while distracted by reading. A bronze Ninomiya statue, sculpted by Junichiro Hannya, was installed in Little Tokyo, Los Angeles in 1983.

There is a reference to him in the novel Obasan by Joy Kogawa. The father often tells the story of Ninomiya Sontoku to his children, relating how

"Up early to the mountains for wood before the rooster calls 'ko-ke-kok-ko!' He studies and works every day to feed his baby brother and his mother. That is how he becomes the great teacher, Ninomiya Sontaku of Odawara, Japan."

== War loot ==
In October 1994, Rollins College, a small private liberal arts college in Winter Park, Florida, United States made international headlines when the government of Japan, per a request from Okinawa Prefecture, asked for the return of a statue that was taken as war loot. It was taken by Clinton C. Nichols, a lieutenant commander in the United States Navy and Rollins graduate, after the Battle of Okinawa. Nichols presented the statue of Ninomiya Sontoku in 1946 to then Rollins President Hamilton Holt who promised to keep it in the main lobby of the college's Warren Administration Building forever.

At first, the college rejected the offer made by Okinawan officials, who suggested that a replica of the statue would be presented to the school if the original was returned. However, after consulting with the U.S. State Department and the college's board of trustees, then Rollins President Rita Bornstein accepted the offer. The statue was returned to Okinawa in 1995 in commemoration of the 50th anniversary of the end of World War II. In addition to providing the college with a replica of the original statue, the government of Okinawa and Rollins signed an "agreement of cooperation" that pledges to develop cooperative projects between the college and Shogaku Junior and Senior High School — where the original statue has been placed.
