= Jim Wong-Chu =

Canadian writer

- 朱藹信
- Born: January 28, 1949; Hong Kong
- Died: July 11, 2017 (aged 68); British Columbia, Canada
- Education: Vancouver School of Art, University of British Columbia
- Occupations: Poet, mail carrier, historian, community organizer

Jim Wong-Chu (朱藹信; January 28, 1949 – July 11, 2017) was a Canadian activist, community organizer, poet, author, editor, and historian. Wong-Chu is one of Canada's most celebrated literary pioneers. He was a community organizer known for his work in establishing organizations that contributed to highlighting Asian arts and culture in Canada. He also co-edited several anthologies featuring Asian Canadian writers.

== Early life ==
Born in Hong Kong on January 28, 1949, Jim Wong-Chu came to Canada in 1953 at age four as a paper son, to live with his aunt and uncle in British Columbia. His aunt lost a child during transit to Hong Kong; with the help of Wong-Chu's father, they were able to create false records. He was seven years old when it was revealed that his aunt was not his birth mother, devastating him. Wong-Chu recalls, "I was the same age as the dead child...They just plucked me in there and I became her son". This event took him years to reconcile, and even in his later years, Wong-Chu felt a strong sense of displacement acknowledging his separate family and identity, Wong-Chu summarizes finding out about his paper son heritage in a 2016 interview:

"In my late teens and early 20s, I was very confused. You're constantly haunted by this idea that you're not legal. It destroyed me totally as an individual...That's identity for you—when you talk about identity to the infinite extreme, it feels like you're a fake."

"It feels like you're not a part of everything around you, that your participation is not welcome and not well-received. That's what you're looking at.

"I was sad and outraged." — Jim Wong-Chu

== Education and career ==
Wong-Chu attended the Vancouver School of Art (now known as Emily Carr University of Art and Design) from 1975 to 1981, majoring in photography and design. During his time at the Vancouver School of Art, Wong-Chu wrote on culture and assimilation for the CFRO-FM radio program called "Pender Guy". From 1985 to 1987 he studied creative writing at the University of British Columbia; his class writings eventually were compiled into his first book of poetry, Chinatown Ghosts. Wong-Chu, and his co-editor Bennett Lee, later published his first anthology, Many Mouthed Birds, a compilation of books, journals and magazines by Asian Canadian authors that was archived in the UBC library's archive.

He began working at Canada Post as a letter carrier in 1975, a position which he held until his retirement in 2013.

== Asian Canadian literature ==
Wong-Chu worked as a community volunteer in the 70s and eventually became interested in the use of literature to explore one's identity as a Canadian of Asian heritage. Wong-Chu was among the first authors of Asian descent, along with Sky Lee and Paul Yee, who challenged the Canadian literary establishment and questioned why there were few Canadian writers of Asian descent, despite their long presence in Canada. Without much guidance, these writers began to experiment with different forms of fiction and decided to form informal writing networks to encourage other Asian Canadians to hone their craft and to eventually send manuscripts to publishers. Wong-Chu's book Chinatown Ghosts (Arsenal Pulp Press, 1986; now out of print, reissued in 2018) was one of the first poetry books by an Asian Canadian writer.

One of Wong-Chu's most successful projects took place in the library stacks of the University of British Columbia, where he researched the entire inventory of books and journals, in search of writings dating back ten to 20 years. With the goal of mapping all Asian Canadian writers and their materials, he helped to compile them into an anthology of Asian Canadian literature. Taking what they considered the 20 best works, Wong-Chu and co-editor Bennett Lee published an anthology called Many Mouthed Birds. One of the pieces anthologized was a short story by Wayson Choy, who later expanded it into the award-winning Vancouver-based book The Jade Peony.

In 1996, Wong-Chu co-founded the Asian Canadian Writers Workshop (ACWW), to promote Asian-Canadian writers against the dominant voices in the Canadian literary scene, particularly those who were never given a chance to get published. Wong-Chu states that the organization was inspired by his time as a UBC student attending writing workshops. He felt frustrated from the students, who couldn't understand Wong-Chu's family dilemma, and decided to create a space where there was understanding of Asian discrimination. The ACWW first offered writers workshops, and later on became a manuscript preparation to help writers find a publisher. The organization fundraised for the establishment of the Emerging Writer Award; winners of the prize have included Rita Wong and Jamie Liew.

Short afterwards, ACWW established an internal newsletter, Ricepaper. It evolved into a Canadian Council-funded literary journal that published a number of Asian Canadian writers on topics relating to culture and identity.

In 2013, Wong-Chu started a festival, the first Asian writers festival in North America.

== Death ==
Jim Wong-Chu suffered a stroke in March 2017 and later died on July 11, 2017.

== Recognition ==
On Wong-Chu's death in 2017, the award was renamed the Jim Wong-Chu Emerging Writer Award, in honour of his legacy and contributions to Canadian writers of Asian descent.

To honour his legacy, the Victoria Arts Council worked with Arsenal Pulp Press, Ricepaper Magazine, LiterAsian Festival and the Asian Canadian Writers' Workshop to translate Wong-Chu's poem "Monsoon" from Chinatown Ghosts into a permanent lightbox sign in Victoria's famed Fan Tan Alley. This double-sided sign, with the poem in English on one side and in Chinese on the other, was produced as the first iteration of the Victoria Arts Council's Poetry in Public campaign (installed October 2019), working with translators Jan Walls and May Yan-Mountain.

In 2021, a Google Doodle honoured Jim Wong-Chu on the 72nd anniversary of his birth.

== Books ==
- Chinatown Ghosts (1986); reissued by Arsenal Pulp Press in 2018.

== Anthologies ==
- Many-Mouthed Birds: Contemporary Writing by Chinese Canadians (1991)
- Swallowing Clouds: An Anthology of Chinese-Canadian Poetry (1999)
- Strike the Wok: A New Chinese-Canadian Anthology(2003)
- AlliterAsian: Twenty Years of Ricepaper Magazine (2015)

== List of awards ==
- Queen Elizabeth II Diamond Jubilee Medal (2013)
- Queen Elizabeth II Golden Jubilee Medal, Department of Canadian Heritage
- Canada Post Silver Postmark Award
- Media Human Rights Award of B'nai Brith Canada (1980)
