= Sun Bo =

Sun Bo may refer to:

- Sun Bo (executive) (孙波; born 1961), former General Manager of China Shipbuilding Industry Corporation
- Sun Bo (footballer) (孙铂; born 1991), Chinese footballer
- Sun Bo (writer), Canadian writer and editor of Chinese descent
