= Robert Trowers =

American jazz musician

Robert Trowers (born 1957) is a jazz trombonist who has recorded two albums and performed with The Count Basie Orchestra, Randy Weston and George Gee.

Trowers was born in Brooklyn, New York, in 1957. After early piano lessons he took up the trombone after listening to swing big bands. His early influences included Lawrence Brown, Tricky Sam Nanton, Tommy Dorsey, Glenn Miller and Jack Teagarden, then the bebop trombonists, including J.J. Johnson, Jimmy Cleveland, Curtis Fuller, and Frank Rosolino.

While at college, Trowers played professionally in the New York area, including with Jaki Byard's "Apollo Stompers" and the Ray Abrams / Hank Doughty Big Band. He travelled to Europe as part of pianist Abdullah Ibrahim's band in 1979. In 1982, Trowers joined Lionel Hampton's band, where he stayed for three and a half years. This was followed by freelance work and teaching in New York, and another tour of Europe, this time with saxophonist Illinois Jacquet. For the next eight years, he played with the Count Basie Orchestra, directed by Frank Foster. During this period, Trowers recorded two albums as a leader – Synopsis (1983) and Point of View (1985) – both of which were released by Concord Records.

"After the Basie years, Mr. Trowers toured with the Lincoln Center Jazz Orchestra under the direction of Wynton Marsalis and later with the Carnegie Hall Jazz Band under Jon Faddis." Towers continued to freelance and play in big bands, and established a non-profit organization that promoted jazz in New York. Trowers is a faculty member at North Carolina Central University.

== Discography ==
=== As leader ===
- Synopsis, June 1992 (Concord)
- Point of View, August 24, 1994 (Concord)

=== As sideman ===
With George Gee

- Settin' the Pace (GJazz)
