= East of the Rockies =

2019 video game

East of the Rockies is a Canadian mobile augmented reality video game application, produced by the National Film Board of Canada and released in 2019. Written by novelist Joy Kogawa based partially on her novels Obasan and Itsuka, the project tells the story of Yuki, a young Japanese Canadian girl in the 1940s who is caught up with her family in the internment of Japanese Canadians during World War II.

The application was released to the Apple Store in March 2019 for iPhones and iPads running iOS 12 or higher. A "pop-up experience" version of the application was also screened at the 2019 Toronto Reel Asian International Film Festival.

The project won the Canadian Screen Award for Best Video Game Narrative at the 8th Canadian Screen Awards in 2020.
