= Ricepaper =

Canadian literary magazine

Past issues of Ricepaper Magazine.

Ricepaper is a Canadian literary magazine with a focus on Asian-Canadian arts and culture. Based in Vancouver, British Columbia, it is published quarterly and features articles, literature, poetry, artwork and photography written by or written about writers and artists of primarily Pacific Asian and mixed Asian descent. It was in circulation between 1995 and 2016, before becoming online-only.

== History ==
Ricepaper was created in 1995 by Jim Wong-Chu, founder of the Asian Canadian Writers' Workshop, as a newsletter for its members. Much of the early editorial content explored the marginalized Asian experience in Canada. Over time, the newsletter grew into a full-fledged magazine which has evolved along with its reader base to provide a forum for creative works, interviews, profiles and reviews of the contemporary Asian-Canadian community. The content of each issue is informed by a "theme". Recent issues have focused on space/culture/place, aesthetics, language and cities. In April 2016 the magazine ended its print publication and went fully online.

Prominent artists that have been featured include Wayson Choy, Joy Kogawa, Kid Koala, and Sook-Yin Lee, as well as cultural producers and figures such as David Suzuki, Bing Thom and Roy Miki. Ricepaper also supports emerging artists; those who have worked or written for Ricepaper magazine have gone on to become notable writers and cultural activists such as Madeleine Thien, Kevin Chong, Craig Takeuchi, Alan Woo and Rita Wong.

== Asian Canadians and Asian Americans featured in Ricepaper ==
Asian Canadians and Asian Americans featured in Ricepaper include Tommy Chong, Wayson Choy, Lixin Fan, Ann Marie Fleming, Joy Kogawa, Larissa Lai, Fiona Tinwei Lam, Joyce Lam, Evelyn Lau, Sook-Yin Lee, Harvey Lowe, Roy Miki, Lily Hoy Price, Andy Quan, Tetsuro Shigematsu, David Suzuki, Bing Thom, Adrian Tomine, Terry Watada, Milton Wong, Rita Wong, Tobias Wong, and Norman Yeung.
