= Regie Cabico =

Filipino-American poet and spoken word artist

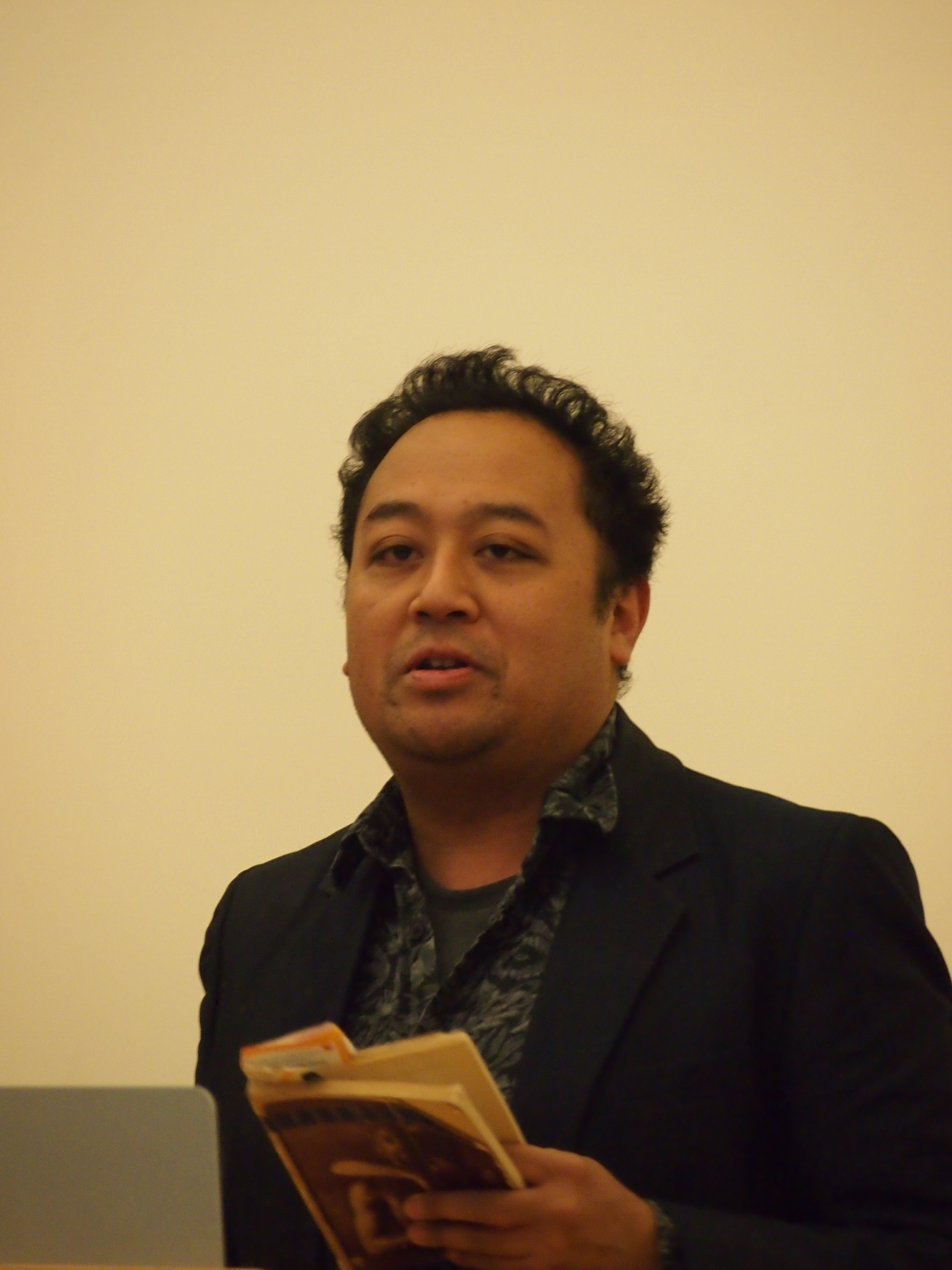
- Writing career
- Language: English
- Genre: Poetry
- Literary movement: spoken word

Regie Cabico is a Filipino American poet and spoken word artist. He has been featured on two seasons of Def Poetry Jam on HBO (produced by Russell Simmons) and has been called the Lady Gaga of spoken word. He is an "out and proud" gay man.

== Life ==
Cabico is a critically acclaimed performance poet who has won top prizes in the 1993, 1994, and 1997 National Poetry Slams. His poetry appears in over 30 anthologies including Aloud: Voices from the Nuyorican Poets Café, Spoken Word Revolution and Slam. He was also featured in MTV's "Free Your Mind" Spoken Word Tour. Regie is the recipient of three New York Foundation for the Arts Fellowships for Poetry and Multi-Disciplinary Performance. He is a regular performer at the Nuyorican Poets Cafe and the Bowery Poetry Club in New York City. He was artist-in-residence at New York University, and De Anza College.

In 1995, he performed at the Asian Pacific American Heritage Festival in New York City. He was a collaborating artist in Rhythmicity at The Humana Festival of New American Plays (2002–2003) season. His first collection of poetry, A Rabbit in Search of a Rolex and Other Hyperboles, Mysteries, Parables and Fantasias, was published by Day Eight on Nov. 15, 2023.

== See also ==
- Filipinos in the New York City metropolitan region
- LGBT culture in New York City
- List of LGBT people from New York City
- NYC Pride March
- Poetry analysis
