= Richard Harrison (poet) =

Canadian poet and essayist

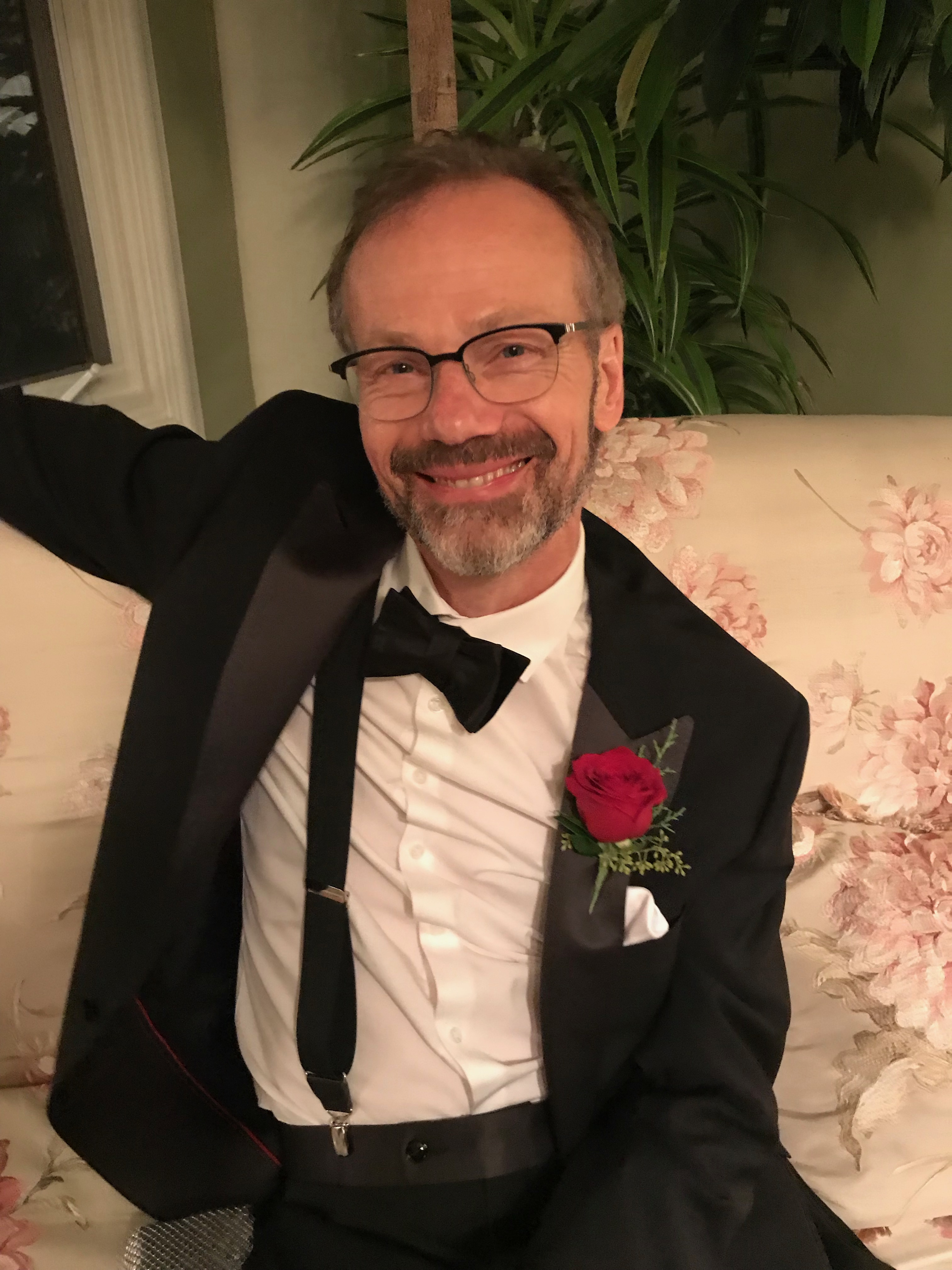
Harrison in 2017

Richard Harrison is a Canadian poet and essayist.

His recent publication, My Mother Joins the Resistance, came out in April 2026.

His 2017 book, On Not Losing My Father's Ashes in the Flood, won the Governor General's Award for English-language poetry and the Alberta Writers Guild Stephan G. Stephansson Award for Poetry, and was shortlisted for the City of Calgary W.O. Mitchell Book Prize.

His fourth book of poetry, Big Breath of a Wish (1998), was nominated for a Governor General's Award and won the City of Calgary Book Prize.

25, released in the fall of 2019, is a 25th anniversary release celebrating the publication of Hero of the Play. It contains new hockey poems, poems from Hero of the Play (original and revised), and commentary.

Harrison was born in Toronto in 1957 and moved to Calgary in 1995 to spend a year as the Calgary Distinguished Writers Program Canadian Writer-in-Residence at the University of Calgary. He has lived in Calgary since then. He holds degrees from Trent University (in biology and philosophy) and Concordia University (in creative writing). He has had teaching positions at Trent University, the University of Calgary, and now Mount Royal University.

He has worked on several books of essays (as an editor and contributor).

== Selected bibliography ==
- 1987 Fathers Never Leave You (Mosaic Press: out of print)
- 1991 Recovering the Naked Man (Wolsak & Wynn: out of print)
- 1994 Hero of the Play (2004 - 10th Anniversary ed. Wolsak & Wynn)
- 1995 Big Breath of a Wish (Wolsak & Wynn)
- 2005 Worthy of His Fall (Wolsak & Wynn)
- 2016 On Not Losing My Father’s Ashes in the Flood (Wolsak & Wynn)
- 2019 Twenty-Five: Hockey Poems New and Revised (Wolsak & Wynn)
- 2026 My Mother Joins the Resistance (Wolsak & Wynn)

== Essay collections ==
- Now is the Winter: Thinking about Hockey (2009 Wolsak & Wynn)
- Secret Identity Reader (2010 Wolsak & Wynn)
