= Calgary Distinguished Writers Program =

University of Calgary program for Canadian writers

The Calgary Distinguished Writers Program at the University of Calgary is an educational program intended to advance the careers of Canadian writers. The program features two annual residential programs: one for the emerging Canadian writers, and one for a distinguished writer of international stature.

While in Calgary, program participants divide their time between writing and community activities. Community activities include individual manuscript consultations and providing advice to local writers, conducting writing workshops, giving public readings, and meeting with school groups.

== History ==
The University of Calgary's Faculty of Arts established the Calgary Distinguished Writers Program in 1993, sourcing funding from a private donors Allen Markin and Jackie Flanagan. Since its inception in 1993, the program has brought to Calgary two Nobel Laureates, Derek Walcott and Wole Soyinka, and well-known writers such as Neil Gaiman, Margaret Atwood, Art Spiegelman, Billy Collins, Timothy Findley, Thomas King, Ursula K. Le Guin, Alberto Manguel, and Michael Ondaatje.

== Complete List of Writers-In-Residence ==
2019–2020 Sharanpal Ruprai

2018–2019 Liz Howard

2017–2018 Denise Chong

2016–2017 Shane Book

2015–2016 Nick Thran

2014–2015 Ian Williams

2013–2014 Sara Tilley

2012–2013 Deborah Willis

2011–2012 Jeramy Dodds

2010–2011 Oana Avasilichioaei

2009–2010 Marcello Di Cintio

2008–2009 Charlotte Gill

2007–2008 Sina Queyras

2006–2007 Jaspreet Singh

2005–2006 Melanie Little

2004–2005 Natalee Caple

2003–2004 Robert Finley

2002–2003 Suzette Mayr

2001–2002 Eden Robinson

2000–2001 Laura Robinson

1999–2000 Richard Sanger

1998–1999 Peter Oliva

1997–1998 Larissa Lai

1996–1997 Rosemary Nixon

1995–1996 Richard Harrison

1994–1995 Ven Begamudré

1993–1994 Roberta Rees

== Complete List of Distinguished Visiting Writers ==
2018–2019 Amitav Ghosh

2017–2018 Marlon James

2016–2017 Michael Chabon

2015–2016 Zadie Smith

2014–2015 Shyam Selvadurai, Evelyn Lau

2013–2014 Neil Gaiman, Alberto Manguel

2012–2013 Margaret Atwood

2011–2012 Billy Collins

2010–2011 Art Spiegelman

2009–2010 Margaret MacMillan

2008–2009 Alberto Rios

2007–2008 Daphne Marlatt, Derek Walcott

2006–2007 Frederick Busch Tribute

2005–2006 Rudy Wiebe, Oliver Sacks

2004–2005 Alistair MacLeod

2003–2004 Anita Rau Badami, Dionne Brand, Louis de Bernières

2002–2003 Robert Kroetsch, Wole Soyinka

2001–2002 Nicole Brossard, Timothy Findley

2000–2001 Gary Burns, Deepa Mehta, Erín Moure, Paul Quarrington, Anne Wheeler

1999–2000 Emma Donoghue, Tony Kushner

1998–1999 Dionne Brand, Louise Halfe, Alberto Manguel, Adrienne Rich

1997–1998 Anita Rau Badami, Rose Scollard

1996–1997 Louis de Bernières, Ursula K. Le Guin, Steve McCaffery, D.M. Thomas

1995–1996 Robin Blaser, Robert Creeley, Keri Hulme, Sir Laurens van der Post, Yevgeny Yevtushenko,

1994–1995 David Albahari, Marilyn Dumont, Thomas King, Tom Raworth

1993—1994 Michael Ondaatje
