= Sina Queyras =

Canadian writer

Sina Queyras is a Canadian writer. To date, they have published seven collections of poetry, a novel and an essay collection.

== Personal life ==
Sina Queyras was born in Nisichawayasihk Cree Nation, Manitoba, Canada. They grew up on the road on Anishinabe, Ininew, Oji-Cree, Dene, Dakota, Kootenai, Kitsumkalum, Kitselas and the Ts’msyen (Tsimshian) territories in Winnipeg, Kaslo, and Terrace, Western Canada. Queyras also studied and lived in Vancouver, Toronto, Montreal, New York, Philadelphia, and Calgary where they were Markin Flanagan Writer in Residence.

== Life and career ==
In 2005, while living in New York, they edited Open Field: 30 Contemporary Canadian Poets for Persea Books, the first anthology of Canadian poetry to be published by a U.S. press. They later edited Canadian Strange, a folio of contemporary Canadian writing for Drunken Boat, where they are a contributing editor. From 2005 to 2007 Queyras co-curated the belladonna* reading series in New York.

Their third collection of poetry, Lemon Hound, received the Pat Lowther Award and a Lambda Literary Award for Lesbian Poetry, and their fourth, Expressway, was a shortlisted finalist for the Governor General's Award for English-language poetry at the 2009 Governor General's Awards. A selection from Expressway won Gold prize in the National Magazine Awards.

They published their first novel, Autobiography of Childhood, in 2011. The book was a shortlisted finalist for the amazon.ca First Novel Award.

Their 2014 poetry collection MxT was again shortlisted for the Lambda Literary Award for Lesbian Poetry, and won the A. M. Klein Prize for Poetry from the Quebec Writers' Federation Awards and the ReLit Award for Poetry. A translation by Marie Frankland was shortlisted for the Governor General's Award for English to French translation at the 2015 Governor General's Awards.

Their work has been published widely in journals and anthologies including Brick Magazine, Malahat Review and Poetry magazine. They teach creative writing at Concordia University in Montreal, where they reside, and have taught at Haverford College and Rutgers University. Queyras curated Writers Read from 2011 to 2026 having hosted such writers as Lydia Davis, Rae Armantrout, Tanya Tagaq, Renee Gladman, Claudia Rankine and Dionne Brand.

== Works ==
=== Memoir ===
- Rooms: Women, Writing, Woolf (2022)

=== Novel ===
- Autobiography of Childhood (2011)

=== Essays ===
- Unleashed (2010)

=== Poetry ===
- Someone from the Hollow (1995)
- Slip (2001)
- Teethmarks (2004)
- Lemon Hound (2006)
- Expressway (2009)
- MxT (2014)
- My Ariel (2017)

=== Anthologies ===
- On Occasion: Poetry for the People (2026)
- Open Field: 30 Contemporary Canadian Poets (2005)

=== Plays ===
- The Outing (1996)

== See also ==
- Canadian literature
- Canadian poetry
- List of Canadian poets
