= Asian Pacific American Heritage Festival =

Coordinates: 40.71581°N 74.00302°W

The Asian Pacific American Heritage Festival, hosted by the Coalition of Asian Pacific Americans in New York City, is one of the largest outdoors celebrations of Asian Pacific American Heritage Month in the United States.

== History ==
Each year, in May, the festival offers music, performances, arts, food, history and corporate outreach. The first festival in 1979 grew out of the civil rights movements of that era when President Jimmy Carter signed the proclamation to declare the first week in May to be Asian American Heritage Week. The proclamation was later extended to Asian Pacific American Heritage Month for the entire month of May. The festival has continued every year to celebrate the diverse cultures of Asian Americans and their contribution to American society. It has become so large that it takes the Coalition all year to put together.

A number of notable Asian American performers have performed at the festival, including Regie Cabico, George Gee with his orchestra, and Terry Watada.
