= The Palace of Firebirds =

2016 book by Tymo Lin

- Author: Tymo Lin
- Original title: 火鳥宮行動
- Language: Taiwanese Mandarin, Taigi
- Genre: Mystery fiction
- Publication date: 2016
- Publication place: Taiwan
- ISBN: 9789864451265

The Palace of Firebirds (Chinese: 火鳥宮行動) is a 2016 book, by Tymo Lin (Chinese: 提子墨), This is a mystery and love story spanning half a century. From the modern computer age back to those years when thousands upon thousands of US Armed Forces from the Vietnam War were taking R&R in Taiwan.

The story follows four young people in Taiwan: a former IT management director who becomes a telemarketer, a romance novelist, a former celebrity, and a scammer, whose paths come together during a journey across the island.

Their lives have intersected with an advanced cancer patient "Ms. Hu" - known as "Christina", one of the first Jazz singers in Taipei’s American club back in 1966.

In search of the American Sergeant, "Ryan Jenkins", from San Francisco who disappeared and a long-lost mixed little boy, Oliver Hu-Jenkins, they started an "Oliver Mission" journey on a scrapped blood donation bus named "Phoenix".

The characters travel across Taiwan, from cities and counties in the north to an aboriginal tribal village in the south, searching for a missing boy named Oliver and a place called "The Palace of Firebirds."

On the journey, they use modern computing, networking, hacking, and cyber man hunting technologies to look for the boy who disappeared without a trace.

This novel is currently in circulation at the "San Francisco Public Library" in the states.
