= Mona Oikawa =

Canadian writer and professor

Mona Oikawa is a Canadian writer and professor.

== Publications ==
- All Names Spoken, with Tamai Kobayashi, Sister Vision Press, 1992
- Out Rage: Dykes and Bis Resist Homophobia, with Rosamund Elwin, Women's Press, 1993
- Cartographies of Violence: Japanese Canadian Women, Memory, and the Subjects of the Internment, University of Toronto Press, 2012
- After Redress: Japanese Canadian and Indigenous Struggles for Justice, with Kristen Emiko McAllister, UBC Press, 2025
