= Terry Watada =

Canadian writer

Terry Watada, born in 1951, is a Toronto writer with many productions and publications to his credit. His publications include Light at a Window (manga, HpF Press and the Greater Toronto National Association of Japanese Canadians 2015), The Game of 100 Ghosts (poetry, Mawenzi House Publishers 2014), The Sword, the Medal and the Rosary (manga, HpF Press and the Greater Toronto NAJC 2013), The TBC: the Toronto Buddhist Church 1995-2010 (history, HpF Press and the TBC 2010), Kuroshio: The Blood of Foxes (novel, Arsenal Pulp Press 2007), Obon: the Festival of the Dead (poetry, Thistledown Press 2006), Ten Thousand Views of Rain (poetry, Thistledown Press 2001), Seeing the Invisible (a children’s biography, Umbrella Press 1998), Daruma Days (short fiction, Ronsdale Press 1997), Bukkyo Tozen: a History of Buddhism in Canada (history, HpF Press 1996) and A Thousand Homes (poetry, Mercury Press 1995).

Though 2020 was a horrendous year, Terry was at his most prolific. His new poetry collection, The Four Sufferings (Mawenzi House Publishers, Toronto), and new novel, Mysterious Dreams of the Dead (Anvil Press, Vancouver), were released at about the same time. Another new poetry collection, Crows at Sunset, was a finalist in the international competition, Eyelands Book Awards, held in Athens, Greece. He was awarded a $10,000 writer's grant from the Toronto Arts Council to write a new novel. He is currently represented by Acacia House Literary Agency.

As a playwright, he has seen five of his plays receive a mainstage production, starting with Dear Wes/Love Muriel during the Earth Spirit Festival at Harbourfront in 1991. Perhaps his best known is Vincent, a play about a Toronto family dealing with a son with schizophrenia. It has been remounted several times since its première in 1993. Most notably, it was produced at the National Arts Centre in Ottawa and the first Madness and Arts World Festival in Toronto (2003). The second Madness and the Arts World Festival invited Vincent to be included in its program in Münster, Germany, during May 2006. His other plays include Mukashi Banashi I and II (children’s plays) and Tale of a Mask. In 2017, the Workman Project will remount of his play Vincent to celebrate its 30th anniversary.

His new play, Sakura: the Last Cherry Blossom Festival, will debut during the Lighthouse Theatre's summer festival in Port Dover ON in 2023. The play is about a beloved resident of Port Dover, Kobi Kobayashi. Because of Kobayashi's community work, the Japanese government donated cherry trees to the town.

His second novel, The Three Pleasures, was released in the fall of 2017 (Anvil Press, Vancouver BC). The book received glowing reviews from the Georgia Straight, the Vancouver Bulletin, the Globe and Mail and the Winnipeg Free Press. "The Three Pleasures" was a finalist for the Foreword Magazine's 2017 Indie Award, honouring the Independent Publishers' best book in various categories. "The Three Pleasures" was a finalist for historical fiction. The novel is in its second printing. He also released his children's book "The Nishga Girl", the story of Judo Jack Tasaka and Eli Gosnell, the chief of the Nisg'a people. It was launched in the fall of 2017 at the Museum of History, Ottawa, Ontario.

He contributed a monthly column for 25 years in the Nikkei Voice, a national journal. In 2012, he began a regular column for the Vancouver Bulletin after it expanded to a national publication. He was recently contracted to write 12 columns for Discover Nikkei, a publication of the Japanese American National Museum, located in Los Angeles CA>

His other essays have been published in such varied magazines, journals and books as Ricepaper, Canadian Literature (UBC),[1] Ritsumeikan Hogaku “Kotoba to sonohirogari” (Ritsumeikan University Press, Kyoto Jpn), Crossing the Ocean: Japanese American Culture from Past to Present, Jimbun-shoin Press (Kyoto Jpn), the National Library of Canada’s website, and Anti-Asian Violence in North America (AltaMira Press, California). Perhaps his most notable article appeared in Maclean's Magazine in March 2011. "Aftershock" described his feelings after the Fukushima tsunami.

He composed the Japanese-Canadian children’s history section and the Japanese, Chinese, and South-Asian Canadian history sections for the [National Library and Archives of Canada] websites.

His short memoir about Etsuji Morii and Rikimatsu Kintaro appeared in the anthology "Vancouver Confidential" (Anvil Press, 2014). The book shot to number one on the BC books bestseller lists and stayed there for two consecutive weeks. In its third week, the book went into its second printing and has since sold consistently well.

In 2014, he was honoured to have delivered the inaugural Midge Ayukawa Lecture at the University of Victoria. In 2019, he delivered the keynote address at the opening of "Being Japanese Canadian", an exhibit at the Royal Ontario Museum.

Essays about his work have appeared in the International Journal of Canadian Studies, Modern Drama (UTP), and in Transcultural Reinventions: Asian American and Asian Canadian Short-Story Cycles (TSAR Publications).

In addition to his literary work, Terry Watada is also a singer/songwriter/producer with a number of records to his credit, including: Night's Disgrace, Runaway Horses, Yellow Fever, Living in Paradise and The Art of Protest, among others. His songs dealing with the Japanese/Canadian/American experience have been used as references in Asian-American history course studies at various universities. He has performed at festivals including the 1995 Asian Pacific American Heritage Festival in New York City. 2015 saw the re-release of his seminal album Runaway Horses as a CD. The project was sponsored by the NAJC (National) and the Hastings Park Foundation.

His papers, personal, academic, literary and musical, have recently been installed in the East Asian Library Collection, Robarts Library, the University of Toronto. It has been designated as follows: Terry Watada Special Collections. His manuscripts and books are part of the permanent collection of the Thomas Fisher Rare Books Library, Robarts Library. His books have been accepted as part of the permanent collection of the Library of Congress, Washington DC, the Japanese American National Library and Museum (Los Angeles CA) and the Stanford University Library in California.

His recent community affiliations include member of the Community Consultation Committee for the Landscapes of Injustice Project based in the University of Victoria, community advisor to the National Association of Japanese Canadians, member of the NAJC Art, Culture and Education Committee and advisor for the Japanese Canadian Artists Directory.

For his writing, music and community volunteerism, he was awarded the Queen Elizabeth II Diamond Jubilee Medal and the NAJC's National Merit Award in 2013. He received in 2014 the Gordon Hirabayashi Human Rights Award, an honour given every two years by the National Association of Japanese Canadians.
