= Alan Woo =

Canadian writer

- Occupation: novelist
- Writing career
- Period: 2010s–present
- Notable works: Maggie's Chopsticks, David Jumps In

Alan Woo is a Canadian writer, who won the Christie Harris Illustrated Children's Literature Prize in 2013 for his debut book Maggie's Chopsticks. His second children's book David Jumps In was released by Kids Can Press in March 2020. He has also published poetry and short stories in Ricepaper, Quills and Plenitude.

Born in England to Chinese immigrant parents, Woo moved with his family to Vancouver, British Columbia in childhood. He is openly gay.
