= Roselle Lim =

Canadian writer

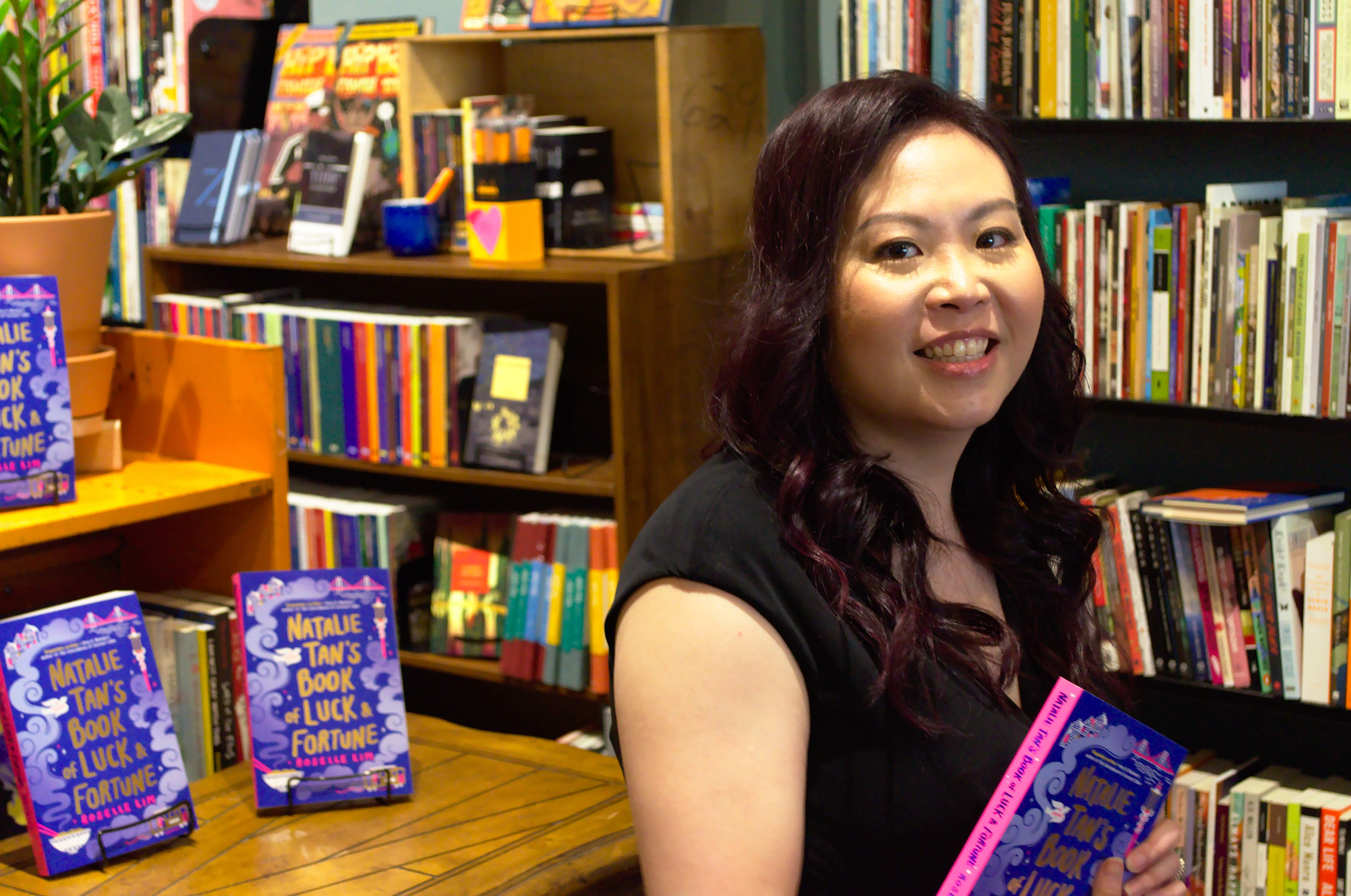
- Roselle Lim posing before a collection of her debut novel
- Born: Roselle Lim; 1980 (age 45–46); Quezon City, Philippines
- Education: York University (BA)
- Occupation: Writer
- Writing career
- Notable works: Natalie Tan's Book of Luck and Fortune (2019)
- Website: www.rosellelim.com

Roselle Lim is a Canadian writer of Filipino-Chinese heritage whose works explore mother-daughter relationships and the Chinese American experience. She was born in Quezon City, Philippines before immigrating to Toronto, Ontario Canada in the 1990s at age 10.

== Career ==
Her debut novel Natalie Tan's Book of Luck and Fortune (2019) was bought at auction by Berkley Books in a two book deal. In June, 2019, it was announced that John Wells Productions had optioned the rights to Natalie Tan's Book of Luck and Fortune for television adaptation.

Lim's third novel Sophie Go's Lonely Hearts Club (2022) was praised with a Kirkus starred review for how "personality quirks are embraced in this delightful story about seeking—and finding—love even if you need help along the way."

== Bibliography ==
=== Novels ===
==== Adult ====
- Natalie Tan's Book of Luck and Fortune (June 11, 2019)
- Vanessa Yu's Magical Paris Tea Shop (August 4, 2020)
- Sophie Go's Lonely Hearts Club (August 16, 2022)
- Night for Day (February 20, 2024)

==== Young Adult ====
- Celestial Banquet (June 3, 2025)

=== Short stories (included in anthologies) ===
- All Signs Point to Yes (May 31, 2022)
- At Midnight (November 22, 2022)
