= Gordon Goichi Nakayama =

Japanese Canadian priest and pedophile

- Born: Goichi Nakayama, 中山吾一; 16 November 1900; Ozu-shi, Ehime-ken, Shikoku, Japan
- Died: 8 October 1995 (aged 94); Vancouver, Canada
- Occupations: Priest, author
- Children: Joy Kogawa, Rev. Timothy Nakayama

Gordon Goichi Nakayama (Goichi Nakayama, 中山吾一, 16 November 1900 – 8 October 1995) was a Japanese Canadian Anglican priest, author and pedophile. He was active in his ministry in Western Canada and the Pacific Rim (notably Okinawa, Southern Japan) for 62 years from 1932 to 1994. Goichi Nakayama has been the subject of controversy surrounding the Anglican Church and their handling of child abuse claims. In 2015 the Anglican Church of Canada revealed that it had received a written confession from Nakayama of his abuse in 1994, and apologizing for withholding the information from the public and the police for over 20 years.

== Life ==
Goichi Nakayama was born in the village of Kurakawa, Ozu-shi, Ehime-ken, Japan in 1900 and immigrated to Canada in 1919. Nakayama settled in Vancouver and was ordained as a priest in 1934 under the Anglican Diocese of New Westminster.

Nakayama helped to build two stone churches and one addition in Vancouver, and in 1941 all three were seized by the City of Vancouver as part of the World War II seizure of Japanese property enacted by the Federal Government.

Nakayama, his family, and all 22,000 Japanese Canadians living in British Columbia were expelled in 1942 from the coast following an Order-In-Council from the Prime Minister's cabinet mandating a 100-mile (160 Km) exclusion zone from the Pacific Coast. Internment camps were scattered, remote communities isolated from one another. Mobility rights were controlled. Nakayama, as an ordained priest and community leader, was permitted to travel between the camps. It is known that on Nakayama's visits to communities he would often be invited to stay in different homes. This right continued after the end of WWII in 1945 and Japanese Canadians were dispersed across Canada as the Japanese were prevented from living in British Columbia until 1949.

After the war ended the Nakayama family settled in Alberta, along with 4000 other Japanese Canadians. Nakayama traveled extensively in his ministry and preached on all six inhabited continents visiting over twenty countries. He was in Okinawa, Japan when he was caught by two priests molesting a child. Sent home in disgrace in 1952, Nakayama continued his ministry under the Diocese of Calgary. He and his family resided in Coaldale where he established the Anglican Church of the Ascension and served as minister until 1978. Following his retirement in Alberta Nakayama moved to Vancouver, BC, where he presided over Holy Cross Japanese Anglican Church until his second retirement.

== Controversy ==
=== Confession ===
At the age of 94, Nakayama typed a letter dated 28 December 1994 from his home in Vancouver, BC, where he acknowledged his pedophilia and admitted to child abuse by calling it "sexual bad behaviour". He gave this letter to the Anglican Church, leading to being charged with immorality by the Bishop of Calgary Barry Curtis and his retirement as a priest. The full letter has been published on the website for the Anglican Diocese of New Westminster in the following text. No criminal charges were brought against the priest and his crimes and admission of guilt were not reported to the police. The inaction by the Anglican Church in Nakayama's criminal actions of sexual misconduct followed a pattern of neglect by officials in the Anglican Communion sexual abuse cases. This pattern of protecting priests and the Church's image parallels the handling of child sexual abuse cases in the Roman Catholic Church.

Dear Friends,

I am very sorry to apologize what I did in the past. I made mistake. My moral life with my sexual bad behaviour. I sincerely sorry what I did to so many people. I hope you forgive me my past mistake. I hope you live a happy life now.

Yours sincerely,

G. G. Nakayama

=== Anglican Healing Fund for Japanese Canadians ===
The Anglican Church of Canada issued an apology on 15 June 2015, for not reporting Mr. Nakayama to police at the time of his confession in 1994. This apology expressed a commitment by the Anglican Church to work with members of the Japanese Canadian community in a healing and reconciliation process. In April 2021, $610,000 CAD of funding was announced by the Anglican Church and the National Association of Japanese Canadians to create a Healing Fund to support the survivors of Mr. Nakayama's abuse, their family members, and community members in their healing journeys. As part of this announcement the Anglican Church also agreed to cover the costs of a Facilitator/Project Manager to lead a project team.

Healing support covers counselling costs, education support, and public education programming. These support programs will be active in the Fund from 9 September 2021 – 9 September 2026.

=== Literature ===
Joy Kogawa, Canadian author and Nakayama's daughter, confronted her father upon learning of his child sexual abuse and assault and learned that he abused around 300 children, mostly boys, from the ages of pre-schoolers to adolescents over his six-decade tenure as a priest. Much of the information surrounding Nakayama's abuse comes from Joy Kogawa's novels, where Kogawa draws from her life experiences with Nakayama and with the internment as major plot elements to create elegant, semi-fictionalized narratives. From The Rain Ascends and Gently to Nagasaki Kogawa makes sexual abuse and her struggle with her father's legacy a central focus. Nakayama was also, himself, a victim of child sexual assault.

== See also ==
=== Archives ===
There is a Gordon Goichi Nakayama fonds at Library and Archives Canada. The archival reference number is R8322.

There is an archive of material related to Gordon Goichi Nakayama on the Healing Fund for Japanese Canadians website.
