= Terry Woo =

Canadian writer

Terry Woo is a Chinese-Canadian author. Born in Hamilton, Ontario, he has lived in Toronto, Seattle, New York, and San Francisco. He has university degrees from the University of Waterloo in Systems Design Engineering, in Psychology, and a degree in Journalism at Ryerson University (now Toronto Metropolitan University).

His first novel, Banana Boys, was published in 2000 and was shortlisted for the 1999 Asian-Canadian Writer's Workshop Award. A theatre adaption of the novel was produced by the fu-GEN Asian Canadian theatre company in 2004 and 2008. The play was remounted by Factory Theatre in 2015 and 2017.

Some of his other writing is available in anthologies including Millenium Messages and Strike the Wok.
