= Tamai Kobayashi =

Canadian writer

- Born: 1966 (age 59–60); Japan
- Occupations: novelist, short story writer
- Writing career
- Period: 1990s-present
- Notable work: Prairie Ostrich
- Website: www.tamaikobayashi.com

Tamai Kobayashi (born 1966 in Japan) is a Canadian writer, who won the Dayne Ogilvie Prize for LGBT writers in 2014.

Kobayashi was co-editor with Mona Oikawa of All Names Spoken, an anthology of lesbian writing published by Sister Vision Press in 1992. She later published two short story collections, Exile and the Heart (1998) and Quixotic Erotic (2003), before publishing her debut novel, Prairie Ostrich, in 2014. In addition, she wrote the short film Short Hymn, Silent War, directed by Charles Officer, and her short story "Panopte's Eye" appeared in the 2004 science fiction anthology So Long Been Dreaming.

Her first short film, Later, In the Life, is about two older lesbians, whose friendship is affected when one of them starts dating.

She was also a founding member of Asian Lesbians of Toronto.

== Works ==
- All Names Spoken (1992, ISBN 9780920813881)
- Exile and the Heart (1998, ISBN 9780889612297)
- Quixotic Erotic (2003, ISBN 9781551521398)
- Prairie Ostrich (2014, ISBN 9780864926807)
