= Lily Hoy Price =

Canadian writer (1930–2021)

Lily Hoy Price (January 14, 1930 – February 16, 2021) was a Canadian memoirist. She grew up in Quesnel, British Columbia and was the ninth daughter of twelve children in the Hoy family. She lived in England, Nigeria, Uganda and Nova Scotia.

At 70, she took a creative-writing workshop at North Island College and started setting down her life story. Her writing has been published in Ricepaper magazine and in the collection of essays, Verve (2006). Her first book is I Am Full Moon: Stories of a Ninth Daughter, stylishly published by Brindle & Glass. The photos are by her father, Chow Dong Hoy, who documented the Cariboo through much of the 20th century.

Price was a member of the Federation of BC Writers, the Comox Valley Writer's Society and the Valley Women of Words (out of Comox Valley). Lily also participated in the 2009 Sunshine Coast Festival of the Written Arts as one of "20 new voices", along with Rebecca Hendry, who is also published by Brindle & Glass. She lived in Courtenay, British Columbia. Price died at home on February 16, 2021, at the age of 91.
