= Nasir Siddiki =

Canadian evangelist, author, and business consultant (born 1953)

Dr. Nasir K. Siddiki
- Born: Nasir Sadeem Siddiki; January 1, 1953 (age 73); London, Ontario, Canada
- Occupations: evangelist; author; business consultant
- Years active: 1990-present
- Television: "Winning with Wisdom"
- Children: 3
- Website: wisdomministries.org

Nasir K. Siddiki (born January 1, 1953) is a Canadian evangelist, author, and business consultant. Since September 2006, Siddiki has hosted a half-hour program on the Trinity Broadcasting Network called "Winning with Wisdom." Siddiki, originally from Canada, was a marketing consultant executive at a financial services company before a bout with shingles in the 1980s, which he says sparked his conversion from Islam to Christianity. Siddiki is still a consultant, but has also started a ministry named Wisdom Ministries in Tulsa, Oklahoma where he resides with his two children Matthew and Josiah, and his oldest son Aaron from his first marriage.

Siddiki primarily serves as a motivational speaker at conferences for Christian businessmen, but has also published a book titled Kingdom Principles of Financial Increase and subsequent pamphlets and videotapes. Siddiki has appeared with and been endorsed by Christian Ministers such as Benny Hinn, Rod Parsley (on his Breakthrough television program), and Kenneth Copeland.

Siddiki graduated from the Rhema Bible Training College, the Bible training center in Broken Arrow, Oklahoma, founded by the son of Kenneth E. Hagin, and has an honorary doctorate from the American Bible College and Seminary in Oklahoma City, Oklahoma.

On August 19, 2020, Nasir's second wife Anita Siddiki filed for divorce in Tulsa County, Oklahoma. On August 21, 2024, the divorce was granted.
