= Omer Aziz =

Canadian-born writer and commentator

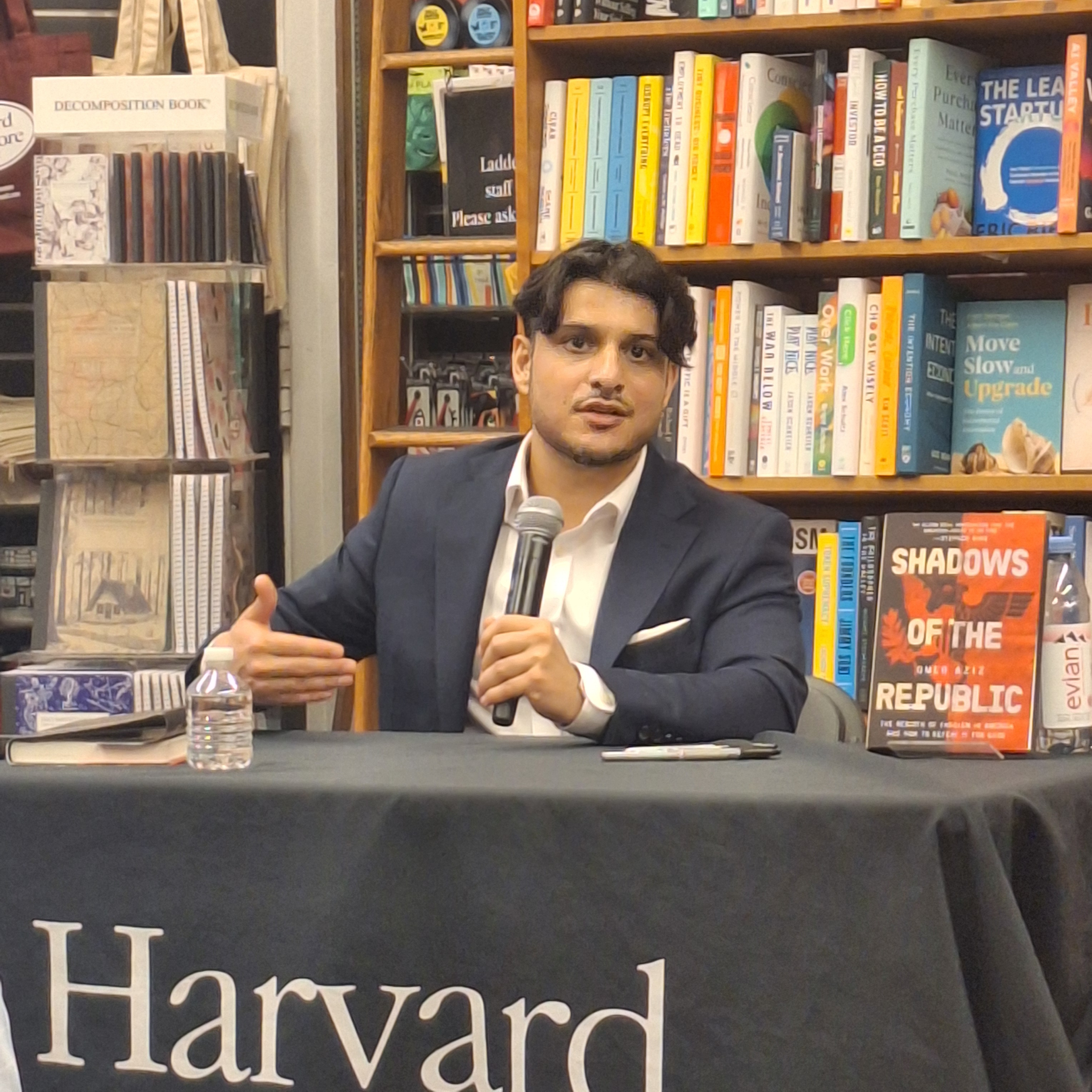
- Aziz speaking at Harvard Book Store in Cambridge, Massachusetts, in April 2026
- Occupations: Writer, commentator, author

Omer Aziz is a Canadian political writer and commentator. His essays and opinion writing have appeared in publications including The Boston Globe, The Atlantic, The New York Times, and The Washington Post. He is the author of Brown Boy: A Memoir (2023) and Shadows of the Republic (2026).

== Career ==
Aziz was a 2022–2023 Catherine A. and Mary C. Gellert Fellow at the Harvard Radcliffe Institute, where he worked on a nonfiction project examining the history and resurgence of far-right politics and fascism in the United States and Europe.

He has written on politics, democracy, identity, religion, and public life for newspapers and magazines. In 2023, Aziz became a contributing writer for The Boston Globe. His work appeared in the The Christian Century, The Globe and Mail, The New Republic, Dissent. and The Walrus.

Aziz has worked as a lawyer and served as a foreign policy advisor in the administration of Canadian Prime Minister Justin Trudeau. He later served as a speechwriter and communications advisor to Prime Minister Mark Carney.

== Books ==
- Brown Boy: A Memoir (2023), published by Scribner.
- Shadows of the Republic: The Rebirth of Fascism in America and How to Defeat It for Good (2026).
