= Tymo Lin =

Canadian-Taiwanese novelist, columnist and book critic

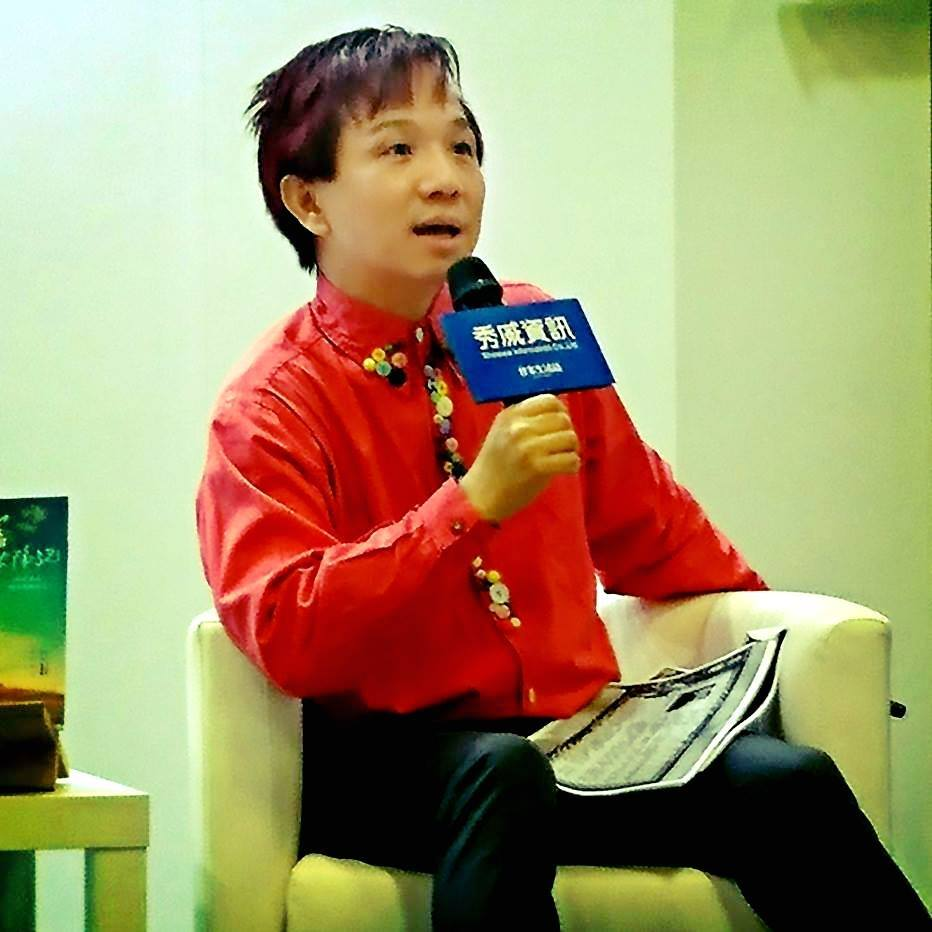
- Born: Taipei, Taiwan
- Education: -Vancouver Film School / 3D Animation & Visual Effects -Pitman College / Desktop Publishing & Microsoft Interface study
- Occupations: Novelist & Columnist
- Writing career
- Pen name: Tymo Lin（Chinese: 提子墨）
- Language: Traditional Chinese, Simplified Chinese, English
- Period: 2006-present
- Genres: Mystery fiction, crime fiction, Travel essays, Column, Reportage
- Notable awards: The 4th Soji Shimada Mystery Awards finalist (2015)

Tymo Lin (Chinese: 提子墨; pinyin: Tí Zimò) is a novelist, columnist and book critic. Lin is an author member of the Crime Writers' Association (UK), P. A. member of the Crime Writers of Canada, and director of the Mystery Writers of Taiwan. He was a finalist in The 4th Soji Shimada Mystery Awards for 2015, a mystery critic for books.com.tw, columnist for ETtoday (Taiwan), Distinctive Taste magazine (San Francisco), World Journal Weekly (New York) and The Mess-Age (Taiwan).

Lin was born in Taipei, currently living in Canada, and graduated from The Vancouver Film School - 3D Animation & Visual Effects. He was a columnist for nine years in North America and has frequently been giving lectures about mystery writing to readers in Taiwan and the USA.

== Biography ==
His award winning mystery novel, The Thermosphere Murders, is about two American astronauts' murder cases and the abnormal explosion of a Russian spacecraft returning from the imaginary space station, "The Universal Space Station". This unique new type of mystery was selected to be one of the top 3 finalists in "The 4th Soji Shimada Mystery Awards" and is currently in circulation at the San Francisco Public Library.

Lin became a full time novelist after receiving the mystery award, his 2016 novel, The Palace of Firebirds, is published by Showwe. It is a mystery and a love story spanning half a century. From the modern computer age back to those years when thousands of US Armed Forces from the Vietnam War were taking R&R in Taiwan.

He also co-translated one of the Mystery Writers of America's books, Writing Mysteries, into the Chinese language published by Marco Polo Press in 2018. One of Lin's novels, Wake Me Up at Happyland, has been nominated by the Ministry of Culture (Taiwan) to be included in the Taiwan pavilion at the 2018 Frankfurt Book Fair in Germany.

== Awards and honours ==
The 4th Soji Shimada Mystery Awards (finalist)

The 10th Mystery Writers of Taiwan Awards (first stage nomination)

== Publications ==
Mystery Novels

- The Thermosphere Murders (Traditional Chinese 熱層之密室 2015) ISBN 978-9-5733-3179-7
- The Thermosphere Murders (Simplified Chinese 热层之密室 2016) ISBN 978-7-5306-7046-0
- The Palace of Firebirds (Traditional Chinese 火鳥宮行動 2016) ISBN 978-9-8644-5126-5
- Aquatic Eye (Traditional Chinese 水眼：微笑藥師探案系列 2017) ISBN 978-9-8693-5678-7
- Wake Me Up at Happyland (Traditional Chinese 幸福到站，叫醒我 2017) ISBN 978-9-5710-7827-4
- The Third Part of The Stars of Heaven (Traditional Chinese 星辰的三分之一 2018) ISBN 978-9-5710-8310-0

Translation

- Writing Mysteries (Traditional Chinese 推理寫作祕笈 2018) ISBN 978-9-5787-5943-5

Travel Book

- Tracing The Sun, Spanning Over The 30°N Latitude (Traditional Chinese 追著太陽跑 ，一頭栽進去用力戰勝自己！ 2016) ISBN 978-9-8644-5169-2

Short Stories

- Short stories and articles scattered in: North America - World Journal, Sing Tao Daily, US Chinese Press, Asian Gazette, Chinese Literature of The Americas magazine; Australia - SameWay magazine; Thailand - World Journal Thailand; Taiwan - United Daily News, China Times...

== Speech ==
USA

2016 Mystery Novels of Taiwan Promotion

- From Agatha to Shimada, from Classic Mystery to New Mystery, 2016-06-11, California / San Francisco Public Library

2017 Showwe Writers' North American Tour

- Tracing The Sun, 2017-06-10, North American Tour - Stop I: California | San Francisco Public Library
- Tracing The Sun, 2017-06-10, North American Tour - Stop II: California | Cupertino Amazing Books
- Tracing The Sun, 2017-06-11, North American Tour - Stop III: California | Culture Center Of TECO in San Francisco
- Tracing The Sun, 2017-06-17, North American Tour - Stop IV: Texas | Dallas Chinese Community Center
- Tracing The Sun, 2017-06-18, North American Tour - Stop V: Texas | Houston Chinese Cultural Center

Taiwan

- The Impossible Crime, 2015-10-03, with Xerxes at Agatha's Murder Ink
- The Writing Schemes for a Novel, 2016-07-10, with Amanda Chi at Kaohsiung International Book Fair
- The Writing Schemes for a Novel, 2016-07-16, with Amanda Chi at New Taipei City Youth Library
- One for All and All for One, 2016-07-31, with Sc Chang and Chihwen Hsiung at King Car Art Gallery
- LOHAS is Easy, 2017-02-04, with TienLo Liang at Gov Books
- Tracing The Sun Vs. Life in Silicon Valley, 2017-02-10, with TienLo Liang at Taipei International Book Fair
- UMA, UFO and Outer Space, 2017-02-10, at Taipei International Book Fair
- UMA, UFO and Outer Space, 2017-02-12, with Dr. Ho-Ling Fu at Taipei International Book Fair
- How to Write a Mystery Story? 2017-10-21 How Do I Promote Taiwan's Mystery Novels? at King Car Art Gallery
- One for All and All for One II, 2018-02-08 with Josef Lee, Xerxes and Chihwen Hsiungat at Agatha's Murder Ink
- The Wide World of Mystery, 2018-02-24 at Taichung ChinSui Library

== Radio Interview ==
USA

- FM 92.3 The Universal FM, San Francisco, California, 2013-03-20, interviewed by Erin Liu
- FM 96.1 Sing Tao Chinese Radio, San Francisco, California, 2016-06-10, interviewed by Joron Lin
- FM 96.1 Sing Tao Chinese Radio, San Francisco, California, 2017-06-09, interviewed by Joron Lin
- AM1050 U.S. Chinese Channel, Houston, Texas, 2017-06-14, interviewed by Shu Ting

== Links ==
- Tymo Lin Official Site
- The Crime Writers' Association - Tymo Lin (UK)
- The Crime Writers of Canada - Tymo Lin
- The Mystery Writers of Taiwan - Tymo Lin
