= Kat Lieu =

American cookbook author

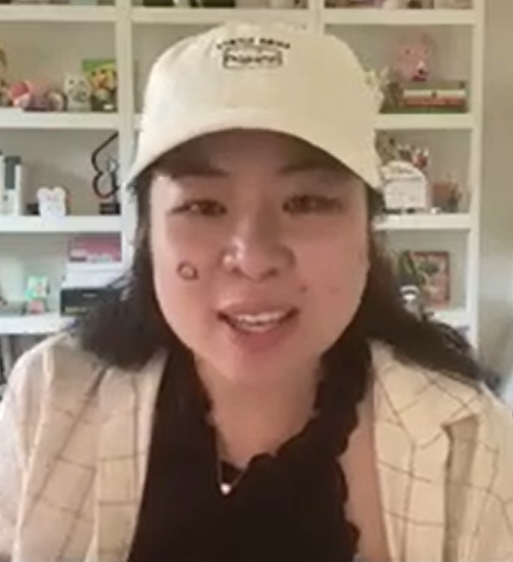
- Hosting an episode of The Ultimate Subtle Asian Bake Off! in 2023
- Born: Montreal, Canada
- Children: 1
- Writing career
- Years active: 2022–present
- Subject: Food

Kat Lieu is a Canadian-American cookbook author and the founder of Facebook group Subtle Asian Baking.

== Early life and education ==
Lieu is of Vietnamese and Chinese (Cantonese) descent. She was born in Montreal, moving to Brooklyn, New York at age two. Growing up, she spent the school year in Brooklyn with her parents, but would spend summers in Montreal with her grandparents; her grandmother loved to bake and cook, and taught Lieu those skills.

Lieu decided to become a physical therapist in high school. She graduated from college in 2008 with a degree in physiotherapy, and worked as a doctor of physical therapy for more than 13 years. In 2023, she decided not to renew her physical therapy license, as part of a full shift to a culinary career. In a 2023 interview, she noted "[physical therapy] never really felt like it was my own choice".

== Career ==
Lieu is a self-taught cook and baker, having never taken professional classes.

In the early days of the COVID-19 pandemic, Lieu found herself missing her mother's cooking, and became aware of the lack of Asian baking recipes online. In May 2020, she founded Subtle Asian Baking, a Facebook group to share Asian-inspired recipes. The group quickly gained traction, with 67,000 members by the end of the year; by 2024, the group had around 160,000 members. The group often runs fundraisers for different organizations.

Lieu has written three cookbooks: Modern Asian Baking at Home (2022), Modern Asian Kitchen (2024), and 108 Asian Cookies (2025). Lieu has said she is a "prolific" writer, and thinks she might write ten to 15 cookbooks in total. She has also written articles for Parade.

Lieu's online food content has drawn racist remarks, and she has spoken out about how these comments are an example of the racism faced by Asian-Americans.

== Recognition ==
Lieu was recognized by 425 Magazine on their 2023 40 Under 40 and 2024 Women to Watch lists.

Her Instagram account was nominated for a 2023 IACP Award in the Individual Instagram Account category. In 2024, she was awarded the Toni Tipton-Martin Award from the IACP.

== Personal life ==
Lieu has lived in Renton, a suburb of Seattle, since 2017. She has a son, who was born in 2013.

== Publications ==
- Modern Asian Baking at Home: Essential Sweet and Savory Recipes for Milk Bread, Mochi, Mooncakes, and More, Inspired by the Subtle Asian Baking Community. June 2022.
- Modern Asian Kitchen: Essential and easy recipes for Ramen, Dumplings, Dim Sum, Stir-Fries, Rice Bowls, Pho, Bibimbaps and more. Beverly, MA, USA: Harvard Common Press. April 9, 2024. ISBN 978-0-7603-8404-6.
- 108 Asian Cookies: Not-Too-Sweet Treats from a Third-Culture Kitchen. October 2025.
