= George Gee (bandleader) =

Chinese American swing big band leader

George Gee is a Chinese American swing big band leader. Born in New York City, he grew up with a fascination in the big band music of the 1930s and 1940s. In 1980, he founded the retro 17-piece George Gee Swing Orchestra (formerly known as the Make-Believe Ballroom Orchestra). He performed with this orchestra at the 1995 Asian Pacific American Heritage Festival in New York City.

In 1998, he formed the ten-piece Jump, Jive & Wailers, named after the Louis Prima song "Jump, Jive an' Wail." Gee is popular with lindy hoppers worldwide, including legendary Savoy Ballroom dancers Frankie Manning and Dawn Hampton.

Prior to the COVID-19 pandemic, Gee and his orchestra played a weekly show at Swing 46 in New York City.
