= Ven Begamudré =

Canadian writer

- Born: 1956 (age 69–70); Bangalore, India
- Education: Carleton University, Warren Wilson College
- Occupations: Poet, short story writer and novelist

Ven Begamudré (born 1956) is a Canadian poet, short story writer and novelist. He was born in Bangalore, India and moved with his family to Canada when he was six. During his writing career, he has been a part of six writers-in-residence. He currently divides his time between western Canada and the island of Bali.

== Personal profile ==
In his memoir, Extended Families: A Memoir of India, Begamudré traces the history on both sides of his family in India. It was nominated for a 2018 Saskatchewan Book Award for Regina Public Library "Book of the Year". His other works include children's books and poetry collections, including The Lightness Which is Our World, Seen From Afar, published in 2006. His collection of short stories Laterna Magika was shortlisted for the 1997 Saskatchewan Book Awards Fiction Prize and Saskatchewan Book Awards Book of the Year.

In addition to short stories and novels, Begamudré has written a biography of Isaac Brock for young adults, and has edited or co-edited several literary collections. He has completed six writer-in-residence appointments including the University of Calgary's Calgary Distinguished Writers Program, the University of Alberta's Department of English, the Canada-Scotland Exchange, Regina Public Library, McMaster University's Department of English, and the Yukon Public Libraries. He has also taught fiction workshops at the Sage Hill Writing Experience. Most recently he has been teaching at Iowa State University.

He has a degree in public administration from Carleton University and an MFA in creative writing from Warren Wilson College in Asheville, N.C. He lives in Regina, Saskatchewan and on the island of Bali.

== Publications ==
His books include:

- Sacrifices, Porcupine's Quill (1986) ISBN 0-88984-071-7
- A Planet of Eccentrics (short stories), Oolichan Books (1990) ISBN 0-88982-100-3
- Van de Graaff Days, Oolichan Books (1993) ISBN 0-88982-126-7
- Laterna Magika (short stories), Oolichan Books (1997) ISBN 0-88982-166-6
- Isaac Brock: Larger than Life (children's biography), XYZ Pubs. (2000) ISBN 0-9683601-7-3
- The Phantom Queen (children's fantasy), Coteau Books (2002) ISBN 1-55050-200-X
- The Lightness Which is Our World, Seen from Afar (poetry), Frontenac House (2006) ISBN 1-897181-02-7

He has also edited Lodestone: Stories by Regina Writers and co-edited Out of Place: Stories and Poems.

Vishnu Dreams, his latest work of fiction (published 9/30/2008), combines Hindu mythology with the story of a family. Through the veil of Vishnu's unions with Lakshmi and his incarnation in the tale of Manu and the fish, the novel portrays a pair of siblings as they navigate 1960s North American culture under the weight of their emotionally abusive father and ambitious mother.

== Awards ==
He has received the F.G. Bressani Literary Prize for Prose, the City of Regina Writing Award, and prizes from various literary magazines. His second story collection, Laterna Magika, shared the City of Regina Book Award and was a best book finalist in the Canada-Caribbean region for the Commonwealth Writers Prize.
