= Larissa Lai =

Canadian writer

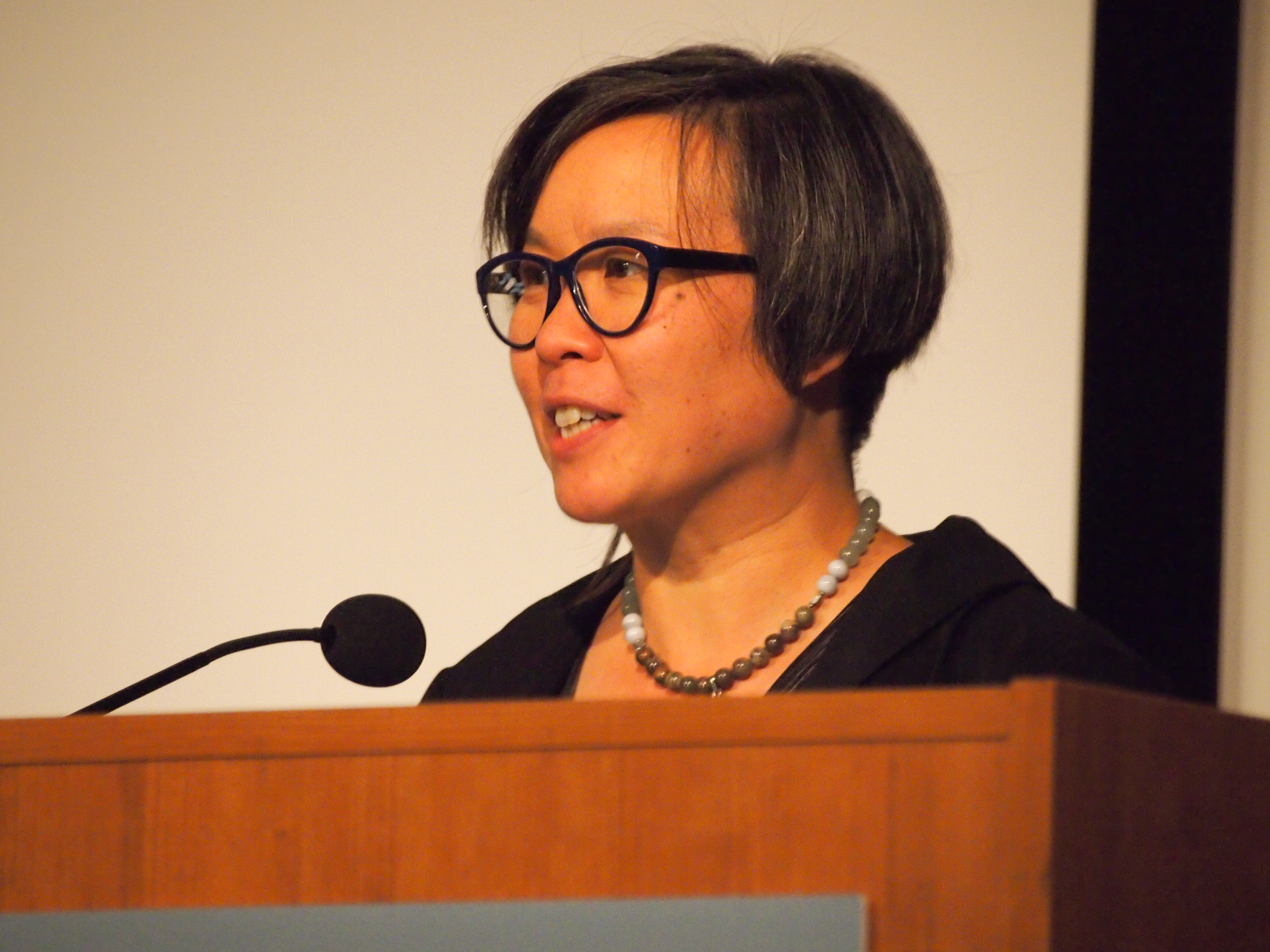
- Lai at the 2017 Asian American Literature Festival
- Born: 1967 (age 58–59); La Jolla, California
- Education: University of British Columbia (BA); University of East Anglia (MA); University of Calgary (PhD)
- Occupations: Writer; poet; literary critic
- Writing career
- Notable works: Salt Fish Girl; When Fox Is a Thousand; The Tiger Flu
- Website: www.larissalai.com

Larissa Lai (born 1967) is an American-born Canadian novelist and literary critic. She is a recipient of the 2018 Lambda Literary Award for Lesbian Fiction and Lambda Literary Foundation's 2020 Jim Duggins, PhD Outstanding Mid-Career Novelist Prize.

== Biography ==
Born in La Jolla, California, she grew up in St. John's, Newfoundland. She attended the University of British Columbia and, in 1990, graduated with a B.A. in Sociology. Subsequently, she earned her MA from the University of East Anglia in Norwich, England, and in 2006, her PhD from the University of Calgary. She is currently an associate professor and Canada Research Chair (Tier II) in Creative Writing at the University of Calgary, where she directs The Insurgent Architects' House for Creative Writing. Formerly she was an associate professor in Canadian Literature in the English Department at the University of British Columbia, where she was also an active committee member of the reading series Play Chthonics at UBC's Green College, and edited poetry for the journal Canadian Literature from 2007 to 2010. A Chinese-Canadian, she has been cited as an example of "the growing elasticity of Canadian fiction and Canadian identity".

Her first novel When Fox Is a Thousand was published in 1995 by Press Gang Publishers and shortlisted for the 1996 Books in Canada First Novel Award. When Fox Is a Thousand was republished by Arsenal Pulp Press in 2004, slightly revised, and with a new Afterword. Her second novel Salt Fish Girl was published in 2002 by Thomas Allen, and shortlisted for the Otherwise Award, the Sunburst Award and the City of Calgary W. O. Mitchell Award.

From 1997 to 1998 she was the Canadian Writer-in-Residence at the Calgary Distinguished Writers Program at University of Calgary, and was writer-in-residence at Simon Fraser University in 2006. She was awarded a Social Sciences and Humanities Research Council postdoctoral fellowship at UBC in 2006–2007.

Lai has twice been an instructor at Clarion West science fiction and fantasy writer's workshop in 2004 and 2007. She was also an instructor at the original Clarion workshop at UCSD in 2009.

She has published articles and criticism in journals such as West Coast Line, Canadian Literature, The Capilano Review, English Studies in Canada and Fuse Magazine, as well as anthologies including Asian Canadian Writing Beyond Autoethnography and Bringing It Home: Women Talk About Feminism in Their Lives. In 2014, she published a non-fiction work, Slanting I, Imagining We: Asian Canadian Literary Production in the 1980s and 1990s, with Wilfrid Laurier University Press, which discusses the movement's context of activism, Canada's ethnic minority history, and writers such as Evelyn Lau and Wayson Choy.

An out lesbian, she was one of the 1997 panelists at Write Out West, one of Canada's first-ever full-scale conferences of LGBT writers.

Her 2018 novel The Tiger Flu won the Lambda Literary Award for Lesbian Fiction at the 31st Lambda Literary Awards, and was also nominated for 2019 Otherwise Award and Sunburst Award. The audiobook, released in May 2020 by ECW Press, was produced by Bespeak Audio Editions for an international audience and narrated by Canadian actors Lisa Truong and Grace Lynn Kung.

== Themes and subjects ==
Lai's work explores intersections of identity in relation to race, culture, gender, and sexuality. In Lai's novels, she draws inspiration from Chinese mythology and culture with a particular focus upon historical and mythological female figures; these historical, cultural, and mythical connections are integrated within a feminist science fiction framework in the novel Salt Fish Girl. Complex romantic and sexual relationships between Asian women are a recurring subject within Lai's work and serve as the main focal point for her novels.

In an interview with Canadian Women in the Literary Arts, Lai discussed her book Slanting I, Imagining We within the context of being involved within the creative and literary fields of Toronto in the 1990s. Lai said of her work during this time: "For me it was a time when questions of race, class, gender and sexuality were open to public debate in a broad and engaged ways. They still held their contentiousness, but productively so. Questions of history, movement, representation and justice were all available for interrogation. The work was not easy. The questions were personal and political and incredibly difficult to answer." Lai cites discussions and interactions with other authors of color during this time as immensely influential and formative for her own work.

== Critical reception ==
Lai's novels have generated much acclaim for their innovative narratives that help readers understand the modern diasporic experience. Her work has also generated a relatively large amount of scholarship and criticism, mostly Canadian, with the exception of a US monograph, The Influence of Daoism on Asian-Canadian Writers (Edwin Mellen Press, 2008).

Many scholars emphasize the contributions that Lai has made critiquing common understandings of race, gender, and national identity. Malissa Phung analyzes Lai as part of Chinese diaspora, and particularly studies how her works investigate concepts such as immigrant shame and what she calls "postmemory." Stephanie Oliver suggests that Lai innovatively uses smell as an indicator of the "politics of representation, regimes of racialization, the power of the gaze, and the dynamics of visibility and invisibility that are key to processes of social marginalization" of the diasporic experience, rather than the more common visual and auditory frameworks.

Sharlee Reimer suggests that Lai's work casts common Enlightenment ideas as racist and limiting, and uses her novels to suggest new ways of understanding, such as her use of cyborgs in Salt Fish Girl to criticize origin stories. Nicholas Birns situates Lai's work as postcolonial transfeminist, prominently featured in the Canadian canon but not as well known internationally, but nonetheless broadly relevant for offering "multiple, diasporic identities to counter the repressive rhetoric of monolithic globalization".

Professors Wei Li and John M. Chen published a 466-page A Study of the Literary Influence of Socialist Theory in Major English-Speaking Countries (Chinese Social Sciences Press) in Beijing in 2018; this highest academic award-winning monograph across China features numerous comments on Lai as a critic, poet, and novelist from an interdisciplinary and multicultural perspective. The study is, in part, a continuation of Professor John M. Chen's The Influence of Daoism on Asian-Canadian Writers (Edwin Mellen Press, 2008).

Professor John M. Chen's Chinese Canadian Literature and Criticism: A Multi-disciplinary and Cross-cultural Approach, Vol. 1, is forthcoming with Springer in 2022. It covers multiple aspects of the genesis and developments of Lai's poetics, politics, aesthetics, and ethics from the feminist, Daoist, post-colonial, Confucian, socialist, gender, Buddhist, and Marxist perspectives, while situating Lai and other Chinese Canadian writers and critics in the context of Chinese and Canadian literary and intellectual traditions since the dawn of Chinese civilization some 5000 years ago.

Sylvie Bérard and Suzanne Grenier have translated some of Lai's work into French. They were nominated for the Governor General's Award for English to French translation at the 2022 Governor General's Awards for Le fruit de la puanteur, their translation of Salt Fish Girl, and won the award at the 2025 Governor General's Awards for Les sœurs de la muée, their translation of The Tiger Flu.

== Bibliography ==
=== Novels ===
- —— (1995). When Fox Is a Thousand (paperback ed.). Press Gang Publishers. p. 236. ISBN 9780889740419.
- —— (2002). Salt Fish Girl (paperback ed.). Thomas Allen Publishers. p. 269. ISBN 9780887621116.
- —— (2018). The Tiger Flu (paperback ed.). Arsenal Pulp Press. p. 334. ISBN 9781551527314.
- —— (2022). The Lost Century (paperback ed.). Arsenal Pulp Press. p. 374. ISBN 9781551528977.

=== Poetry collections ===
- ——; Wong, Rita (2008). Sybil Unrest (paperback ed.). Linebooks. p. 112. ISBN 9780978498139.
- —— (2019). Automaton Biographies (paperback ed.). Arsenal Pulp Press. p. 168. ISBN 9781551522920.
- —— (2021). Iron Goddess of Mercy (paperback ed.). Arsenal Pulp Press. p. 176. ISBN 9781551528441.

=== Chapbooks and short stories ===
- "New Reeboks" (1994)
- "The Home Body" (1994)
- "Water, and other Measures of Distance" (1996)
- "The Voice of the Blind Concubine" (1996)
- "The Peacock Hen" (1996)
- "April’s New Apartment" (1997)
- "S" (1998)
- "Pomegranate Tree" (2000)
- "Fish Bones" (2000)
- "Nu Wa" (2001)
- "The Combing" (2004)
- Rachel (2004) –
- "I Love Liver: A Romance" (2005)
- Eggs in the Basement (2009)
- Nascent Fashion (2004)
- "The Starfish's Groom" (2010)
- "What the Wyliei Wanted" (2014)

=== Non-fiction ===
- Slanting I, Imagining We: Asian Canadian Literary Production in the 1980s and 1990s (2014) Waterloo, Ont.: Wilfrid Laurier University Press. ISBN 0-88920-417-9.
