= Rita Wong =

Canadian poet (born 1968)

- Born: 1968 (age 57–58); Calgary, Alberta, Canada
- Writing career
- Genre: Poetry
- Website: blogs.eciad.ca/ritawong

Rita Wong (born 1968) is a Canadian poet.

== Biography ==
Wong grew up in Calgary, Alberta, and currently lives in Vancouver, British Columbia. She is the author of multiple books of poetry, including monkeypuzzle, forage, and undercurrent. Her work investigates the relationships between social justice, ecology, decolonization, and contemporary poetics. Wong is an associate professor at the Emily Carr University of Art and Design, teaching Critical and Cultural Studies. She has developed a course on Cultivating Ecological, Cross-Cultural, and Interdisciplinary Contemplations of Water. She has also been a visiting instructor at the University of Miami.

In 2024, she was the winner of the Latner Griffin Writers' Trust Poetry Prize for her body of work.

== Education ==
Wong graduated with a BA (Hons) in 1990 from the University of Calgary. She received two Master's degrees: one in English from the University of Alberta in 1992, and one in Archival Studies in 1996 from the University of British Columbia. In 2002, she received her PhD from Simon Fraser University.

== Published works ==
=== monkeypuzzle ===
Wong's first poetry collection, monkeypuzzle, was published by Press Gang in 1998. Reviewer Sook C. Kong in Herizons called it "a huge achievement." Mark Libin for Canadian Literature agreed that the collection "does indeed, as the book jacket declares, announce a promising new voice in Canadian literature." Wong's poems in the volume address her identity as a bisexual Asian woman.

=== forage ===
forage, a second collection, was published in 2007; it explores how ecological crises relate to the injustices of the international political landscape. In Wong's words, "the next shift may be the biggest one yet, the union of the living, from mosquito to manatee to mom." Aaron Giovannone in Canadian Literature called the book "a dynamic mixture of styles .... [that] coheres because of the author's voice, which is emboldened by a sense of sheer affront and the need to find "ground to push against, red earth, / bloody earth, stolen earth."" The book won the 2008 Dorothy Livesay Prize.

== Wong and the environment ==
Wong's poetry often addresses her relationship with land and local watersheds. Her poems show a close connection with nature and a support for local product, while expressing distaste for genetically modified foods. In forage, her poem 'the girl who ate rice almost every day' encourages the reader to look up Monsanto in the US patent database, and see how many patents there are for genetically modified foods, including the type of foods affected. There is also a poem, 'canola queasy' dedicated to Percy Schmeiser, the Saskatchewan farmer sued by Monsanto because he intentionally propagated genetically engineered canola that had blown into his fields. Her work challenges the reader to think about how they affect their environment. For instance, in 'sort by day burn by night' Wong brings attention to Guiyu village, a small village in China whose main profit comes from disassembling circuit boards, usually with a sharp rock because they cannot afford a hammer. When asked about her own computer use, Wong notes, "as someone who relies heavily on computers, I am implicated in the degradation and eventual destruction of ecosystems (mining for coltan)", but writes to try to "reconcile [her] intent (to work toward peace and social justice) with [her] consumption patterns as a citizen in North America".

Wong's prose shares her experiences with watersheds in locations such as the Salish Sea, the Peace Valley, Wet'suwet'en territory, and the Athabasca Rivershed.

On 16 August 2019, Wong was sentenced to 28 days in jail for breaking an injunction after a peaceful protest against the Trans Mountain Pipeline, owned by the Canadian government. After her release, having suffered the most severe punishment handed out for these protests at that time, Amnesty International commented that it was an example of criminalization of peaceful protest.

== Bibliography ==
=== Books authored ===
- beholden: a poem as long as the river. With Fred Wah. Talonbooks, 2018. ISBN 9781772012118.
- perpetual. With Cindy Mochizuki. Nightwood Editions, 2015. ISBN 9780889713130.
- undercurrent. Nightwood Editions, 2015. ISBN 978-0-88971-308-6
- sybil unrest. With Larissa Lai. LINEBooks, 2008. ISBN 9781554200696.
- forage. Nightwood Editions, 2007. ISBN 0-88971-213-1
- monkeypuzzle. Press Gang, 1998. ISBN 0-88974-088-7

=== Books edited ===
- Downstream: Reimagining Water. With Dorothy Christian. WLU Press, 2016. ISBN 9781771122139

=== Journal articles ===
- "Decolonizasian: Reading First Nations and Asian Relations in Literature", in Canadian Literature, 199 (Winter 2008): 158–80.
- "Market Forces and Powerful Desires: Reading Evelyn Lau's Cultural Labour", in Kam Louie and Tseen Khoo (eds.), Culture, Identity, Commodity: Diasporic Chinese Literatures in English. Hong Kong: Hong Kong UP. 2005.
- "Re Sounding Dissent", in Open Letter, 2004.
- "Troubling Domestic Limits: Reading Border Fictions Alongside Salt Fish Girl by Larissa Lai", in BC Studies 140 (Winter 2003/04): 109–24.
- "Globalization and Poverty as Violence Against Women." in Paul Taylor (ed.) The Heart of the Community: the Best of the Carnegie Newsletter. Vancouver: New Star Books, 2003. 227–28.
- "Historical fictions, or when is an arrival not an arrival?" in K. Love (ed.) Facing History: Portraits from Vancouver. Vancouver: Presentation House and Arsenal Pulp Press, 2002. 38–39.
- "Influences", in Contemporary Verse 2 25.1 (Summer 2002): 79–80.
- "Partial Responses to the Global Movement of People", in West Coast Line 34.3, No. 33 (Winter 2001): 105–19.
- "Market Forces and Powerful Desires: Reading Evelyn Lau's Cultural Labour", in Essays on Canadian Writing 73 (Spring 2001): 122–40.
- "The I in Migrant", in West Coast Line 33.3, No. 30 (Winter 2000): 105–8.
- Interview, by Larissa Lai. In West Coast Line 33.3, No. 30 (Winter 2000): 72–82.
- "An Intelligent and Humane Response", in Kinesis (November 1999): 12, 17.
- "Writing History in Fiction", in Rice paper 4.1 (1998): 33.
- "Asian Heritage Month in Vancouver: Building Community", in Kinesis (1997): 16.
- "Jumping on Hyphens", in Makeda Silvera (ed.) The Other Woman: Women of Colour in Contemporary Canadian Literature. Toronto: Sister Vision Press, 1994. 117–53.
- "Have You Eaten Yet? Two Interviews", in Edna Alford and Claire Harris (eds.) Kitchen Talk. Red Deer: Red Deer College Press, 1992. 149–57.
