= Sun Bo (writer) =

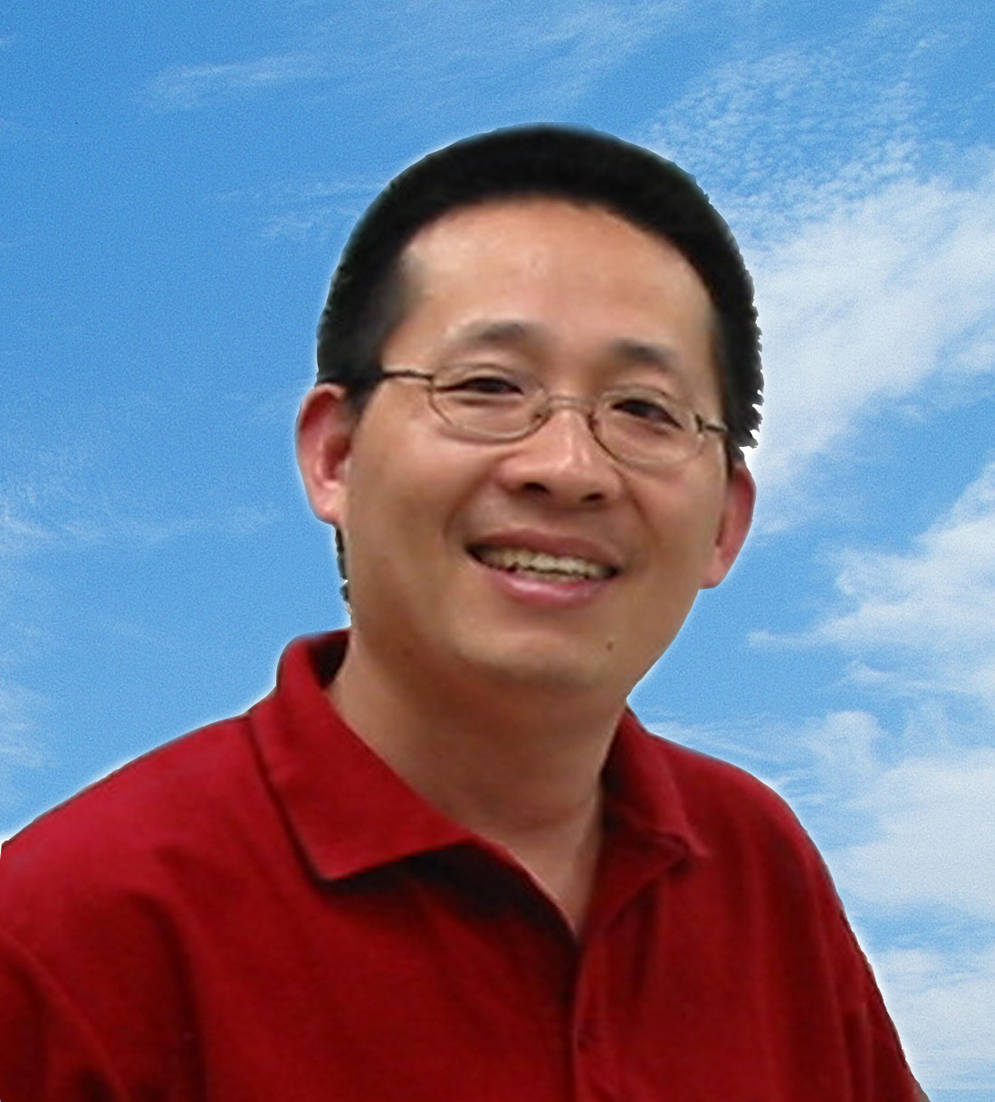

Sun Bo (Chinese 孙博, English Bob Sun,1962-) is a senior editor of newspaper and writer, screenwriter in Toronto, Ontario, Canada. He is the editor-in-chief of 365netTV.com, and the President of Chinese Pen Society of Canada (CPSC). He is also a member of the Toronto Chinese Writers' Association.

== Bibliography ==
Sun Bo was born in Shanghai, had been a lecturer at University before coming to Canada in 1990. He was the President of Chinese Pen Society of Canada (CPSC) from 2003 to 2009 and from 2013 to the present. He has published over 10 books in Chinese, including the novels Reflux, Tears of Camellia, Men in 30's and Juvenile Visa Students in Tears.

=== Novels ===
- Sun Bo (孙博)，《男人三十》 (Nanren sanshi) (Men in 30's)。北京：文化艺术，2000。[ISBN 7-5039-1935-3/I.827]
- Sun Bo (孙博)，《茶花泪》(Chahua lei)(Tears of Camellia)(Simplified Chinese character edition) 北京：中国青年，2001. [ISBN 7-5006-4240-7/I.924 ]
- Sun Bo (孙博)，《茶花泪》(Chahua lei)(Tears of Camellia)(Traditional Chinese character edition) 台湾：生智，2002 ISBN 957-818-380-1
- Sun Bo (孙博)，《回流》(Hui liu) (Reflux) 北京：中国青年，2002。ISBN 7-5006-4856-1
- Sun Bo (孙博)，《小留学生泪洒异国》(Xiao Liuxuesheng Leisa Yiguo)(Juvenile Visa Students in Tears) 北京：群众，2004。[ISBN 7-5014-3108-6/I.1321 ]

=== Collections ===
- Wu Hua(吴华)、Sun Bo (孙博)、Shi Heng(诗恒)主编《西方月亮──加华作家短篇小说精选集》(Xifang Yueliang) (The Sojourners: Stories by Chinese-Canadian Writers，Compiled by Wu Hua, Sun Bo & Shi Heng) 台湾：水牛, 2004。ISBN 957-599-745-X
- Wu Hua(吴华)、Sun Bo (孙博)、Shi Heng(诗恒)主编《叛逆玫瑰──加华作家中篇小说精选集》(Pan'ni Meiguei) (Defiant Roses:Stories by Chinese-Canadian Writers，Compiled by Wu Hua, Sun Bo & Shi Heng) 台湾：水牛, 2004。ISBN 957-599-746-8
- Sun Bo (孙博)主编《旋转的硬币──加中笔会作品集》(XuanZhuan de YingBi) (Spinning the Coin :Writings by Members of the Chinese Pen Society of Canada, Compiled by Sun Bo) 四川成都: 成都时代，2007。 ISBN 978-7-80705-402-3
- Sun Bo (孙博)主编《走遍天下──首届世界华人游记征文大赛精选集》(ZouBian TianXia) (Around The World :Selected 100 Essays of The First Chinese Travel Writing Contest, Compiled by Sun Bo) 加拿大：多蒙，2008。 ISBN 1-894514-06-8
- Xu Xueqing(徐学清)、Sun Bo (孙博)主编《枫情万种──加华作家散文精选集》 (FengQing Wan Zhong)(Re-rooting & Root Searching:Selected Prose Essays Chinese-Canadian Writers ，Compiled by Xu Xueqing & Sun Bo),繁体字版(Traditional Chinese character edition) 台湾：水牛, 2005 。[ISBN 957-599-784-0 ]
- Xu Xueqing(徐学清)、Sun Bo (孙博)主编《枫情万种──加华作家散文精选集》 (FengQing Wan Zhong) (Re-rooting & Root Searching: Selected Prose Essays Chinese-Canadian Writers，Compiled by Xu Xueqing & Sun Bo) ，简体字版(Simplified Chinese character edition) 北京：作家，2006。ISBN 7-5063-3434-8
- Sun Bo (孙博)、Yu YueYing(余月瑛)，纪实文学集《小留学生闯世界》(XiaoLiuXueSheng Chuang ShiJie)(Reportage Collection of The Interview with Visa Students)上海：少年儿童，2001。[ISBN 978-7-5324-4747-3. /1.1911]
- Sun Bo (孙博)、Yu YueYing(余月瑛)，纪实文学集《枫叶国里建家园》(FengYe Guoli JianJiaYuan)( Reportage Collection of New Life for Immigrants in Canada) 台湾：水牛, 1996。ISBN 957-599-561-9
- Sun Bo (孙博)，散文集《您好！多伦多》(Nin Hao! DuoLunDuo)(Essay Collection of Hello Toronto)台湾：水牛,1995。 [ISBN 957-599-531-7 ]
- Sun Bo (孙博)， 旅游集《多伦多》( DuoLunDuo)(Travel Collection of Toronto)台湾：太雅，first edition 2001, new edition 2006。ISBN 978-986-6952-09-8
- Sun Bo (孙博)， 旅游集《上海》(Shanghai)(Travel Collection of Shanghai)台湾：太雅，first edition 2001, new edition 2007。[ISBN 978-986-6952-23-4 ]
