= Obasan =

1981 novel by Joy Kogawa

- First edition cover
- Author: Joy Kogawa
- Language: English
- Subject: Canadian history, World War II history, Asian studies
- Publisher: Lester & Orpen Dennys
- Publication date: 1981
- Publication place: Canada
- Media type: Print (Hardcover, Paperback)
- Pages: 279
- ISBN: 0-919630-42-1
- OCLC: 421601187
- Preceded by: Jericho Road
- Followed by: Woman in the Woods

Obasan is a novel by Japanese-Canadian author Joy Kogawa. First published by Lester and Orpen Dennys in 1981, it chronicles Canada's internment and persecution of its citizens of Japanese descent during the Second World War from the perspective of a young child. In 2005, it was the One Book, One Vancouver selection.

The book is often a required reading for university English courses on Canadian literature. It also figures in ethnic studies and Asian-American literature courses in the United States.

Kogawa uses strong imagery of silence, stones, and streams throughout the novel. She has many interesting dreams that are carried throughout the novel, as well. Themes depicted in the novel include memory and forgetting, prejudice and tolerance, identity, and justice versus injustice. Kogawa also contemplates many of these themes in her poetry.

== Plot ==
Set in Canada, Obasan centers on the memories and experiences of Naomi Nakane, a 36-year-old schoolteacher living in the rural Canadian town of Cecil, Alberta, when the novel begins. The death of Naomi's uncle, with whom she had lived as a child, leads Naomi to visit and care for her widowed aunt Aya, whom she refers to as Obasan (obasan being the Japanese word for "aunt"). Her brief stay with Obasan in turn becomes an occasion for Naomi to revisit and reconstruct in memory her painful experiences as a child during and after World War II, with the aid of a box of correspondence and journals sent to her by her Aunt Emily, detailing the years of the measures taken by the Canadian government against the Japanese citizens of Canada and their aftereffects. With the aid of Aunt Emily's letters, Naomi learns that her mother, who had been in Japan before the bombing of Pearl Harbor, was severely injured by the atomic bomb dropped on Nagasaki, a finding that changes her perspective of the War in the Pacific, and rekindles the heartbreak she experienced as a child.

Naomi's narration thus interweaves two stories, one of the past and another of the present, mixing experience and recollection, history and memory throughout. Naomi's struggle to come to terms with both past and present confusion and suffering form the core of the novel's plot.

Although Obasan is fiction, the events, parliamentary legal documents, and overall notion of racism mirror reality. Through the eyes of fictional characters, Kogawa tells the story of Japanese-Canadians during the war.

== Characters ==
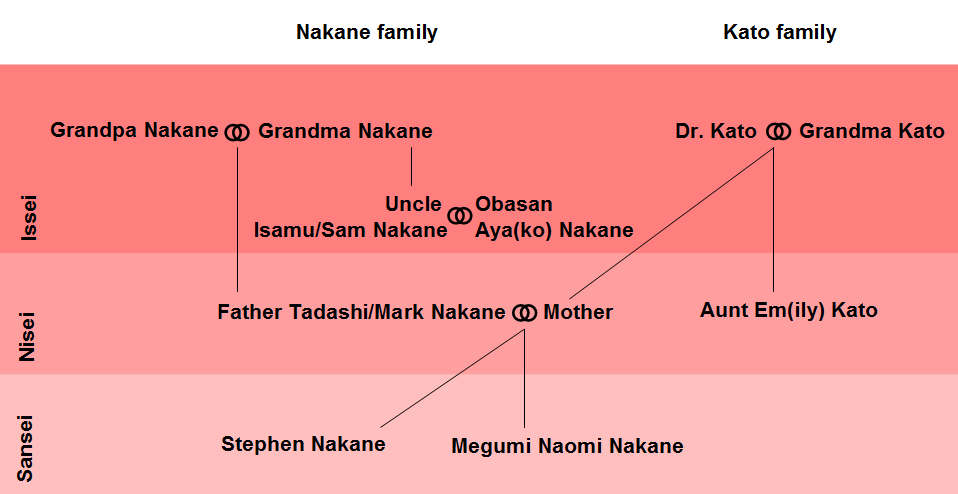
Naomi's family tree

The characters in Obasan are part of Naomi's Japanese-Canadian family. Its members fall into three major groups, depending on their birthplace, and consequently, nationality.

The Issei are first-generation Japanese-Canadians, Japan-born emigrants living in Canada. Their children are the Nisei or second-generation Japanese-Canadians, Canadian-born people with Canadian nationality, and the Nisei's children, the Sansei, or third-generation Japanese-Canadians.

== Reception ==
Obasan was named as one of the 100 Most Important Canadian Books by the Literary Review of Canada and in 1982 was awarded the Books in Canada First Novel Award by literary magazine Books in Canada, the Canadian Authors Association's Award for Fiction, and the Before Columbus Foundation's American Book Award
