= Joy Kogawa =

Canadian poet and novelist

- Born: Joy Nozomi Nakayama; June 6, 1935 (age 91); Vancouver, British Columbia, Canada
- Writing career
- Notable works: Obasan, East of the Rockies, The Rain Ascends
- Notable awards: Order of Canada; Order of British Columbia; Order of the Rising Sun

Joy Nozomi Kogawa CM OBC (born June 6, 1935) is a Canadian poet and novelist of Japanese descent.

== Life ==
Kogawa was born Joy Nozomi Nakayama on June 6, 1935, in Vancouver, British Columbia, to first-generation Japanese Canadians Lois Yao Nakayama and Gordon Goichi Nakayama. She grew up in a predominantly white, middle-class community.

During World War II, the Japanese military attacked Pearl Harbor on December 7, 1941, and twelve weeks later Kogawa was sent with her family to the internment camp for Japanese Canadians at Slocan during World War II. After the war she resettled with her family in Coaldale, Alberta, where she completed high school. In 1954 she attended the University of Alberta, and in 1956, the Anglican Women's Training College and The Royal Conservatory of Music in Toronto. She moved back to Vancouver in 1956 and married David Kogawa there in 1957, with whom she had two children: Gordon and Deirdre. The couple divorced in 1968, and the same year Kogawa attended the University of Saskatchewan. She moved to Toronto in 1979 and has lived there since.

Kogawa published first as a poet, beginning in 1968 with The Splintered Moon. She began to work as a staff writer for the Office of the Prime Minister in Ottawa in 1974. In 1981, she published her first prose work: Obasan, a semi-autobiographical novel that has become her best-known work. Books in Canada awarded the book its First Novel Award in 1981, and in 1982 Kogawa won the Book of the Year Award from the Canadian Authors Association and an American Book Award from the Before Columbus Foundation. Kogawa adapted the book for children as Naomi's Road in 1985.

A sequel, Itsuka (1992), was rewritten and retitled Emily Kato (2005), and then republished as Itsuka (2018).

Obasan has been named as one of the most important books in Canadian history by the Literary Review of Canada and was also listed by The Toronto Star in a "Best of Canada" feature. Obasan was later adapted into a children's book, Naomi's Road (1986), which, in turn, Vancouver Opera adapted into a 45-minute opera that toured elementary schools throughout British Columbia. The opera was also performed before the general public in the greater Vancouver area, Red Deer and Lethbridge, Alberta, Seattle, Washington, and Ottawa, Ontario, at the National War Museum. Revival performances in November 2016 by Toronto's Tapestry Opera won rave reviews, especially in the Toronto Star, which recognized their setting as one "steeped in significance".

Although the novel Obasan describes Japanese Canadian experiences, it is routinely taught in Asian American literature courses in the United States, due to its successful "integration of political understanding and literary artistry" and "its authentication of a pan-Asian sensibility."

Kogawa now lives mainly in Toronto, Ontario, but at one time divided her time between Vancouver and Toronto and was the 2012–13 Writer-in-Residence at the University of Toronto. In 2018, Kogawa formed a group called Yojaros with a Vancouver-based Japanese poet Soramaru Takayama.

Kogawa wrote the narrative for the augmented reality game East of the Rockies, produced by the National Film Board of Canada and released in 2019. The project won the Canadian Screen Award for Best Video Game Narrative at the 8th Canadian Screen Awards in 2020.

The home of the last Japanese-Canadian Anglican parish in Vancouver is Holy Cross church.

== Recognition ==
In 1986, Kogawa was made a Member of the Order of Canada; in 2006, she was made a Member of the Order of British Columbia.

In 2010, the Japanese government honored Kogawa with the Order of the Rising Sun "for her contribution to the understanding and preservation of Japanese Canadian history."

Kogawa has been awarded several honorary doctorates. The most recent was by the University of Saskatchewan on November 10, 2020.

== Campaign to save Kogawa House ==
The Save Kogawa House committee initiated a campaign to save Kogawa's childhood home, owned by her father Gordon Goichi Nakayama, in the Marpole neighbourhood of Vancouver from demolition. They developed national support from writers and writing organizations across Canada demonstrating that the house at 1450 West 64th Avenue was regarded by many as having historical value and literary significance, similar to Berton House, Emily Carr House and the Haig-Brown Institute. The Save Kogawa House committee made a successful presentation to the City of Vancouver councilors to create an unprecedented 120-day delay of the processing of a demolition permit on November 3, 2005, two days after the city had pronounced Obasan Cherry Tree Day and planted a graft of the cherry tree at Vancouver City Hall from the original tree at Kogawa House.

The Land Conservancy of British Columbia became involved in the saving of Kogawa House on December 2, 2005. Working with the Save Kogawa House committee, TLC took over the fund-raising efforts and media attention. TLC became the owner of the house on May 31, 2006. Ownership transferred to the City of Vancouver in 2016. They now are raising funds to renovate the house to increase accessibility and restore its appearance when Joy lived there in the late 1930s and early 1940s.

Kogawa House was recommended to be given heritage status by the City of Vancouver and was placed on City Council's agenda for July 12, 2022. Within the available application papers and heritage designation papers presented to the public and City Council for review, however, no mention was made of the house's heritage connection to the home's former owner Mr. Nakayama, a pedophile priest who abused hundreds of children. Community members raised concern that the heritage application misled the City and the public by openly ignoring parts of the home's history. On July 11, 2022, the agenda item covering the heritage status vote was removed in order to address the community's concerns.

The Historic Joy Kogawa House Society has operated a writer-in-residence program in the house since 2008. They have hosted four writers to date: poet and editor Dr. John Asfour of Montreal in 2009, novelist and writing educator Nancy Lee of Richmond in 2010, creative non-fiction author Susan Crean in 2011, short-fiction author Deborah Willis in 2012, and PEN Canada writer-in-exile, novelist, editor, freelance journalist, and faculty member Ava Homa in 2013.

== Bibliography ==
=== Poetry ===
- The Splintered Moon. Fredericton, NB: Fiddlehead Poetry Books, 1967.
- A Choice of Dreams. Toronto: McClelland & Stewart, 1974.
- Jericho Road. Toronto: McClelland & Stewart, 1977.
- Six Poems. Toronto: League of Canadian Poets, 1980.
- What Do I Remember of the Evacuation? Scholastic Education Canada, 1985
- Woman in the Woods. Oakville, ON: Mosaic Press, 1985.
- A Song of Lilith. Vancouver: Polestar, 2000.
- A Garden of Anchors: Selected Poems. Oakville, ON: Mosaic, 2003.

=== Novels ===
- Obasan. Toronto: Lester & Orpen Dennys, 1981. (winner of the 1982 Books in Canada First Novel Award)
- Itsuka. Toronto: Penguin, 1992. (rewritten as Emily Kato – 2005)
- The Rain Ascends. Toronto: Knopf, 1995. (revised edition released in 2003)

=== Nonfiction ===
- Gently to Nagasaki. Caitlin Press, 2016.
- East of the Rockies. National Film Board of Canada, 2019.

=== Children's literature ===
- Naomi's Road. Toronto: Oxford University Press, 1986; Fitzhenry & Whiteside, 2005.
- Naomi's Tree. Toronto: Fitzhenry & Whiteside, 2009.

Except where noted, bibliographic information courtesy Brock University.

== See also ==
=== Archives ===
There is a Joy Kogawa fonds at Library and Archives Canada. The archival reference number is R5678.
