= Thomas Head Raddall Award =

Canadian literary award

Thomas Raddall Atlantic Fiction Award
- Description: Canadian literary award for the best work of adult fiction published in the previous year by a writer from the Atlantic provinces
- Country: Canada
- Presented by: Atlantic Book Awards & Festival

The Thomas Raddall Atlantic Fiction Award is a Canadian literary award administered by the Atlantic Book Awards & Festival for the best work of adult fiction published in the previous year by a writer from the Atlantic provinces. The prize honours Thomas Head Raddall and is supported by an endowment he willed to it. The award is currently worth $30,000, with additional finalists receiving $500 each.

== Winners and nominees ==
=== 1990s ===
Year	Writer	Title	Ref.
1991	Wayne Johnston	The Divine Ryans	
1992	Herb Curtis	The Last Tasmanian	
1993	John Steffler	The Afterlife of George Cartwright	
1994	David Adams Richards	For Those Who Hunt the Wounded Down	
1995	Bernice Morgan	Waiting for Time	
1996	M. T. Dohaney	A Marriage of Masks	
1997	Alfred Silver	Acadia	
1998	Shree Ghatage	Awake When All the World Is Asleep	
1998	Edward Riche	Rare Birds	
1999	Wayne Johnston	The Colony of Unrequited Dreams	
1999	Lynn Coady	Strange Heaven	
1999	Don Hannah	The Wise and Foolish Virgins	
1999	David Adams Richards	The Bay of Love and Sorrows	

=== 2000s ===
Year	Writer	Title	Ref.
2000	Alistair MacLeod	No Great Mischief	
2000	Carmelita McGrath	Stranger Things Have Happened	
2000	Donna Morrissey	Kit's Law	
2001	Carol Bruneau	Purple for Sky	
2001	Robert Finley	The Accidental Indies	
2001	David Adams Richards	Mercy Among the Children	
2002	Michael Crummey	River Thieves	
2002	Linda Little	Strong Hollow	
2002	Anne Simpson	Canterbury Beach	
2003	Donna Morrissey	Downhill Chance	
2003	Christy Ann Conlin	Heave	
2003	Susan Goyette	Lures	
2004	Kenneth J. Harvey	The Town That Forgot How to Breathe	
2004	Leo McKay Jr.	Twenty-Six	
2004	David Adams Richards	River of the Brokenhearted	
2005	Edward Riche	The Nine Planets	
2005	Kelly Cooper	Eyehill	
2005	Michael Winter	The Big Why	
2006	Donna Morrissey	Sylvanus Now	
2006	George Elliott Clarke	George & Rue	
2006	Lisa Moore	Alligator	
2007	Linda Little	Scotch River	
2007	Wayne Johnston	The Custodian of Paradise	
2007	Ami McKay	The Birth House	
2008	Don Hannah	Ragged Islands	
2008	Bernice Morgan	Cloud of Bone	
2008	David Adams Richards	The Lost Highway	
2009	Douglas Arthur Brown	Quintet	
2009	Ian Colford	Evidence	
2009	Sara Tilley	Skin Room	

=== 2010s ===
Year	Writer	Title	Ref.
2010	Shandi Mitchell	Under This Unbroken Sky	
2010	Michael Crummey	Galore	
2010	Linden MacIntyre	The Bishop's Man	
2011	Kathleen Winter	Annabel	
2011	Alexander MacLeod	Light Lifting	
2011	Beth Powning	The Sea Captain's Wife	
2012	David Adams Richards	Incidents in the Life of Markus Paul	
2012	Valerie Compton	The Road	
2012	Heather Jessup	The Lightning Field	
2013	Russell Wangersky	Whirl Away	
2013	Keir Lowther	Dirty Bird	
2013	Donna Morrissey	The Deception of Livvy Higgs	
2014	William Kowalski	The Hundred Hearts	
2014	Shashi Bhat	The Family Took Shape	
2014	Ed Kavanagh	Strays	
2015	Darren Greer	Just Beneath My Skin	
2015	Michael Crummey	Sweetland	
2015	David Adams Richards	Crimes Against My Brother	
2016	R. W. Gray	Entropic	
2016	Elisabeth de Mariaffi	The Devil You Know	
2016	Mark Anthony Jarman	Knife Party at the Hotel Europa	
2017	Donna Morrissey	The Fortunate Brother	
2017	Darren Greer	Advocate	
2017	Ami McKay	The Witches of New York	
2018	Oisin Curran	Blood Fable	
2018	Carol Bruneau	A Bird on Every Tree	
2018	Sarah Faber	All Is Beauty Now	
2019	Lisa Moore	Something for Everyone	
2019	Sharon Bala	The Boat People	
2019	Elisabeth de Mariaffi	Hysteria	

=== 2020s ===
Year	Writer	Title	Ref.
2020	Michael Crummey	The Innocents	
2020	Jaime Burnet	Crocuses Hatch from Snow	
2020	Shandi Mitchell	The Waiting Hours	
2021	Anne Simpson	Speechless	
2021	Bridget Canning	Some People's Children	
2021	Morgan Murray	Dirty Birds	
2022	Michelle Butler Hallett	Constant Nobody	
2022	David Huebert	Chemical Valley	
2022	Sharon Robart-Johnson	Jude and Diana	
2023	K.R. Byggdin	Wonder World	
2023	Bobbi French	The Good Women of Safe Harbour	
2023	Lisa Moore	This Is How We Love	
2024	Michelle Porter	A Grandmother Begins the Story	
2024	Violet Browne	This Is the House That Luke Built	
2024	Charlene Carr	Hold My Girl	
2024	Amanda Peters	The Berry Pickers	
2024	William Ping	Hollow Bamboo	
2025
2025	David Huebert	Oil People	
2025	Mark Blagrave	Felt	
2025	Carol Bruneau	Threshold: Stories	
2025	Charlene Carr	We Rip the World Apart	
2025	Susie Taylor	Vigil	
2026
2026	Jaime Burnet	milktooth	
2026	Renée Belliveau	A Sense of Things Beyond	
2026	Robert de la Chevotière	We Were Not Kings	
2026	Danny Jacobs	The Ignis Psalter	
2026	Danica Roache	Five Seasons of Charlie Francis	
