= Venus Envy =

Venus Envy could be:

- Venus Envy (novel), by Rita Mae Brown
- Venus Envy (album), a 1998 album by the band Diesel Boy
- Venus Envy (sex shop), a Canadian sex shop and independent book store
- Venus Envy (webcomic), a webcomic
