= Whirl Away =

- First edition cover of Canadian release
- Author: Russell Wangersky
- Publisher: Thomas Allen Publishers
- Publication date: March 17, 2012
- Publication place: Canada
- Media type: Print (hardback & paperback)
- Pages: 240 pp.
- ISBN: 9780887629365

Whirl Away is a book written by award winning Canadian writer Russell Wangersky, first published in March 2012, by Thomas Allen Publishers. In the book, the author compiles a collection of short stories that examine "what happens when people's personal coping skills go awry."

== Awards and honours ==
Whirl Away received shortlist honours for the 2012 Scotiabank Giller Prize, and won the 2013 Thomas Head Raddall Award.

== Adaptations ==
The story "Sharp Corner" was adapted by Jason Buxton for the 2024 feature film Sharp Corner.
