= Shandi =

Shandi may refer to:

== People ==
- Shandi Finnessey, Miss USA winner and game show host
- Shandi Mitchell, Canadian novelist
- Shandi Sinnamon, the American singer, songwriter

== Places ==
- Shendi the city of Shandi (or Shendi) in Sudan

== Other uses ==
- "Shandi" (song), a song by the American hard rock band Kiss
