= Christ on a Bike =

Christ on a Bike is the title of:

- A show by Richard Herring, a British comedian
- A short story by Ami McKay, a Canadian writer
- A comic strip in Viz, a British adult spoof comic magazine
