= Amanda Peters =

Canadian writer

Amanda Peters is a Mi'kmaw writer from Falmouth, Nova Scotia, whose debut novel The Berry Pickers was the winner of the 2024 Andrew Carnegie Medal for Excellence in Fiction, 2023 Barnes & Noble Discover Great New Writers Award, 2024 Crime Writers of Canada Award of Excellence, and 2024 Dartmouth Book Award for Fiction.

== Life ==
Of mixed Mi'kmaw and European heritage, Peters was born and raised in the Annapolis Valley region of Nova Scotia as a member of the Glooscap First Nation.

== Writing ==
The Berry Pickers centres on a young Mi'kmaw girl who goes missing in Maine, depicting the event's lifelong effects on both her birth family and the girl herself, who grows up as the child of a white family with no knowledge of her origins. The novel was published in early 2023 by Harper Perennial. In addition to its Carnegie Medal win, the book was shortlisted for the 2023 Atwood Gibson Writers' Trust Fiction Prize, the 2024 Amazon.ca First Novel Award, the 2024 Thomas Head Raddall Award, and the Margaret and John Savage First Book Award for Fiction.

She was nominated for an Indigenous Voices Award in the Unpublished English Prose category in 2019 for her short story "Pejipug (Winter Arrives)", and won in the same category in 2021 for her debut short story collection Waiting for the Long Night Moon. Waiting for the Long Night Moon, was published on August 13, 2024. Stories in this collection are in inspired by Peters' own background and deal with themes of grief and resilience.

== Awards ==
Year	Work	Award	Category	Result	Ref
2021	Waiting for the Long Night Moon	Indigenous Voices Award	Unpublished Prose in English	Won	
2023	The Berry Pickers	Atwood Gibson Writers' Trust Fiction Prize	—	Shortlisted	
2023	The Berry Pickers	Barnes & Noble Discover Great New Writers Award	—	Won	
2024	The Berry Pickers	Amazon.ca First Novel Award	—	Shortlisted	
2024	The Berry Pickers	Andrew Carnegie Medal for Excellence	Fiction	Won	
2024	The Berry Pickers	Crime Writers of Canada Award of Excellence	First Novel	Won	
2024	The Berry Pickers	Atlantic Book Awards	Dartmouth Book Award for Fiction	Won	
2024	The Berry Pickers	Atlantic Book Awards	Margaret and John Savage First Book Award for Fiction	Shortlisted	
2024	The Berry Pickers	Atlantic Book Awards	Thomas Head Raddall Award for Fiction	Shortlisted	

== Publications ==
=== Novels ===
- —— (2023). The Berry Pickers. Catapult Books. ISBN 9781646221950.
- —— (2026). The Birthing Tree. Harper Perennial. ISBN 9781443476706.

=== Short story collections ===
- —— (2024). Waiting for the Long Night Moon. Catapult Books. ISBN 9781646222599.
