= Southern Discomfort (novel) =

1982 novel by Rita Mae Brown

- Author: Rita Mae Brown
- Language: English
- Genre: Fiction, Comedy
- Published: 1982 (Bantam Books)
- Publication place: United States

Southern Discomfort is a 1982 novel by Rita Mae Brown. Through comedy and farce, it explores the theme of hypocrisy, especially that based on social status.

== Plot synopsis ==
The plot occurs between the years 1918-1928, in Montgomery, Alabama. Hortensia Reedmuller Banastre is a beautiful woman who comes from old money. She is the mother of two, and is trapped in a loveless, yet "socially appropriate" marriage. She falls in love with Hercules, a teenage black prizefighter. After Hercules dies as the result of a train accident, and the failure of the slow, for-blacks-only ambulance, Hortensia gives birth to their daughter, Catherine. To avoid the inevitable scandal, Catherine is raised by Hortensia's cook. However, the jealousy of Hortensia's son, Paris, who becomes increasingly crazed, threatens to upend the balance Hortensia has achieved in her life; and continued secrecy becomes impossible once Catherine, who clearly does not belong in either black or white worlds, becomes curious as to her lineage. After some emotional upheaval, however, the Hortensia and Catherine's lives settle into a new and happy order.

Subplots in the novel include the view of Montgomery and its residents through the eyes of the prostitutes Banana Mae Parker and Blue Rhonda Latrec, who divide the town by sexual categories, and the star-crossed film stars Grace Deltaven and Payson Thorpe.

== Characters ==
- Hortensia Reedmuller Banastre: A wealthy, unhappily married woman who falls in love with a young black man, causing emotional upheaval in the lives of her family and herself.
- Carwyn Banastre: Hortensia's husband and father of Horetensia's two sons.
- Hercules Jinks: The young prizefighter with whom Hortensia has a love affair, resulting in the birth of their daughter, Catherine.
- Paris Banastre: Hortensia's son, whose obsession with his mother threatens to upend all the family's lives.
- Catherine: Daughter of Hortensia and Hercules.
- Reverend Linton Ray: An inept, uptight reformer.
- Blue Rhonda Latrec and Banana Mae Parker: Entrepreneurial prostitutes who make a living off of the sexual double standards of the local white men.
- Grace Deltaven: Local girl who becomes a silent film star and marries film idol Payson Thorpe.

== Reception ==
New York Times reviewer Annie Gotlieb, analyzes Brown's view that passion is inherently innocent, but places the choices characters make in its name in the context of rules: "It's a grown-up novelist's insight that every freedom must be understood within the bounds of a shared social structure that can, if stretched, yield painful renewal; if shattered, tragedy." Gotlieb laments Brown's need to fit the novel's plot into too-tight constraints: "It's rare to say that a book would be better if it were longer, but I suspect that in a less impatient era Southern Discomfort would have been a 700-page epic that slowly revealed the roots of character and the intertangling of disparate lives. As it is, the book often seems abrupt and arbitrary, jump-cut as if it were a two-hour movie... minor characters, like Hercules's boxing manager, Sneaky Pie, are so vivid that they cry out for more space. The plot moves in fits and starts. A fistfight between mother and son is perfectly rendered, but a later, even more crucial scene of violence is rushed and anticlimactic. The reader is left feeling charmed, moved - and a little bit cheated."

In The Boston Phoenix, Gail Caldwell said that "Brown has done her homework in laying out the bones of this novel, and the result is her most intelligent work to date — one that borrows its historical detail from the likes of Ragtime and its bawdy humor from the likes of Chaucer." Caldwell had only "relatively small" complaints: "It’s no small feat to pull off this many subplots and intricacies in character development; Brown does it quite well most of the time. But the scope of Southern Discomfort occasionally outdistances its depth."

In a generally positive review, Kirkus nevertheless rates Southern Discomfort as, "Brown, less infectiously than in Rubyfruit Jungle or Six of One, celebrates anything-goes sexual exuberance and scampers up and down the ladder of social class."
