= K.R. Byggdin =

Canadian writer

- Occupation: Novelist
- Writing career
- Period: 2020s–present
- Notable work: Wonder World
- Website: krbyggdin.com

K.R. Byggdin (born 1991) is a Canadian novelist from Halifax, Nova Scotia.

== Career ==
Byggdin began publishing short fiction in 2018, with publications in The Antigonish Review, Grain, and others.

Their debut novel, Wonder World, was published by Enfield & Wizenty (Great Plains Press) in 2022. The novel tells the story of a 27-year-old pansexual Mennonite man named Isaac Funk who returns to his small Manitoba town after years on the East Coast.

Wonder World won the Thomas Head Raddall Award at the 2023 Atlantic Book Awards, and was a finalist for the 2023 ReLit Award for fiction.

== Personal life ==
Byggdin grew up in Niverville, Manitoba, where they attended a Mennonite church. Due to their close contact with Mennonite communities, Byggdin jokes that they are "Mennonite by osmosis". They began to pursue writing as a career after being exposed to the writing of Miriam Toews by the town's mayor while working in a summer job for the town government.

Byggdin studied creative writing at Dalhousie University.
