= Arielle Twist =

Cree Canadian poet

- Born: Saskatchewan
- Occupations: artist, author, sex educator
- Notable work: Disintegrate/Dissociate (2019)
- Awards: Indigenous Voices Award for English Poetry (2019); Disintegrate/Dissociate; Dayne Ogilvie Prize (2019); Disintegrate/Dissociate

Arielle Twist is a Nehiyaw (Cree) multidisciplinary artist and sex educator based in Halifax, Nova Scotia, Canada. She is originally from George Gordon First Nation in Saskatchewan and describes herself as a Two-Spirit, transgender woman.

She was mentored in her early career by trans writer Kai Cheng Thom whom she met at Venus Envy in 2017. They quickly became friends. During this time, she discovered poetry that resonated with her as a trans First Nation woman, such as the works of Katherena Vermette, inspiring her to write poetry that was representative of her interests and identity.

The institutions that have featured Twist's work include the Khyber Centre for the Arts, the Toronto Media Arts Centre, La Centrale Galerie Powerhouse, the Centre for Art Tapes, the Art Gallery of Mississauga, the Art Gallery of Nova Scotia and the Agnes Etherington Art Centre. She has also worked in visual and performance art.

Her poetry collection, Disintegrate / Dissociate, won the Indigenous Voices Award for English Poetry and the Dayne Ogilvie Prize in 2020. After publishing this collection, she began working as a sex educator at Venus Envy and became an MFA candidate at OCAD University in the Interdisciplinary Art, Media and Design graduate studies programme. Twist's work has been praised for its raw, vulnerable exploration of grief, trauma, and identity within Indigenous and trans spaces, bridging the gap between contemporary visual art, performance, and community-focused sex education.

== Career ==
=== Writing ===
Arielle Twist began writing in 2017 after being encouraged by her mentor Kai Cheng Thom whom she met at Thom’s book launch at Venus Envy. Twist went on to publish the essay "What It's Like to Be a Native Trans Woman on Thanksgiving" in Them on November 23, 2017. After their publishing debut, Twist went on to perform her first poetry reading at Venus Envy alongside her mentor. She also attended the Naked Heart Festival in Toronto and began a residency at the Banff center where she debuted her first poems. Arielle met Billy-Ray Belcourt during her Banff Centre who guided her through her first manuscript.

Twist debuted as an author with a collection of thirty-eight poems in her book Disintegrate / Dissociate published on June 4, 2019 by Arsenal Pulp Press. The book focuses on "human relationships, death, and metamorphosis". Her poems, which have been described as raw, confrontational, and eloquent, examine themes of colonization, kinship, displacement, and transmisogyny. About her writing, Twist states that "It feels like the most vulnerable thing [she has] ever done". Twist says Disintegrate / Dissociate is about "love, loss, and grief" as well as her coping with her trauma through dissociation. The poem "Manifest" in the book was dedicated to editor Billy-Ray Belcourt who also held residency at the Banff Centre while Twist was there.

In late 2019, Arielle also contributed to the Together Apart Series. Twist's book publication along with her collection of essays has earned Twist recognition and awards including the Dayne Ogilvie Prize for LGBTQ Emerging Writers from the Writers' Trust of Canada and the Indigenous Voices Award for English poetry in 2020.

== Awards and nominations ==
Year	Work	Award	Category	Result	Ref.
2019	—	National Magazine Award	—	Shortlisted	
2019	—	Artist Recognition Award; Arts Nova Scotia	Indigenous Artist Recognition Award	Won	
2019	—	Pushcart Prize	—	Nominated	
2020	Disintegrate / Dissociate	Dayne Ogilvie Prize	—	Won	
2020	Disintegrate / Dissociate	Indigenous Voices Award	English Poetry	Won	
2020	Disintegrate / Dissociate	Publishing Triangle Awards	Leslie Feinberg Award	Finalist	

== Published work and exhibitions ==
=== Books ===
- Disintegrate / Dissociate (2019)

=== Short Works ===
Year	Title	Published Location	Type	Ref.
2017	"What It's Like to Be a Native Trans Woman on Thanksgiving"	Them	Essay	
2018	"On Translating the Untranslatable"	Canadian Art	Essay	
2018	"Soakers"	The Fiddlehead	Poem	
2018	"Rework"	This Magazine	Poem	
2018	"Contemporary Poetics of Trans Women of Colour Artists"	Facilitated by: Kama La Mackerel	Performance	
2018	"Vacant Faces"	Khyber Centre for the Arts	Exhibit	
2019	"Together Apart Issue 2: Projections"		Series	
2019	"Poems for Impending Doom – Digital Exhibition"	Halifax's Centre for Art Tapes	Exhibit	
2019	"Cumming Commons"	SBC Gallery	Performance	
2019	"Split Tooth"	Canadian Art	Review	
2020	"Trancestry"	Canadian Art	Essay	
2020	"Post Emo Theory"	Canadian Art	Poem	
2021	"How streaming video games on Twitch helped me find pure, unapologetic joy in the midst of a pandemic"	CBC Arts	Essay	
