= Jaime Burnet =

Canadian writer and lawyer

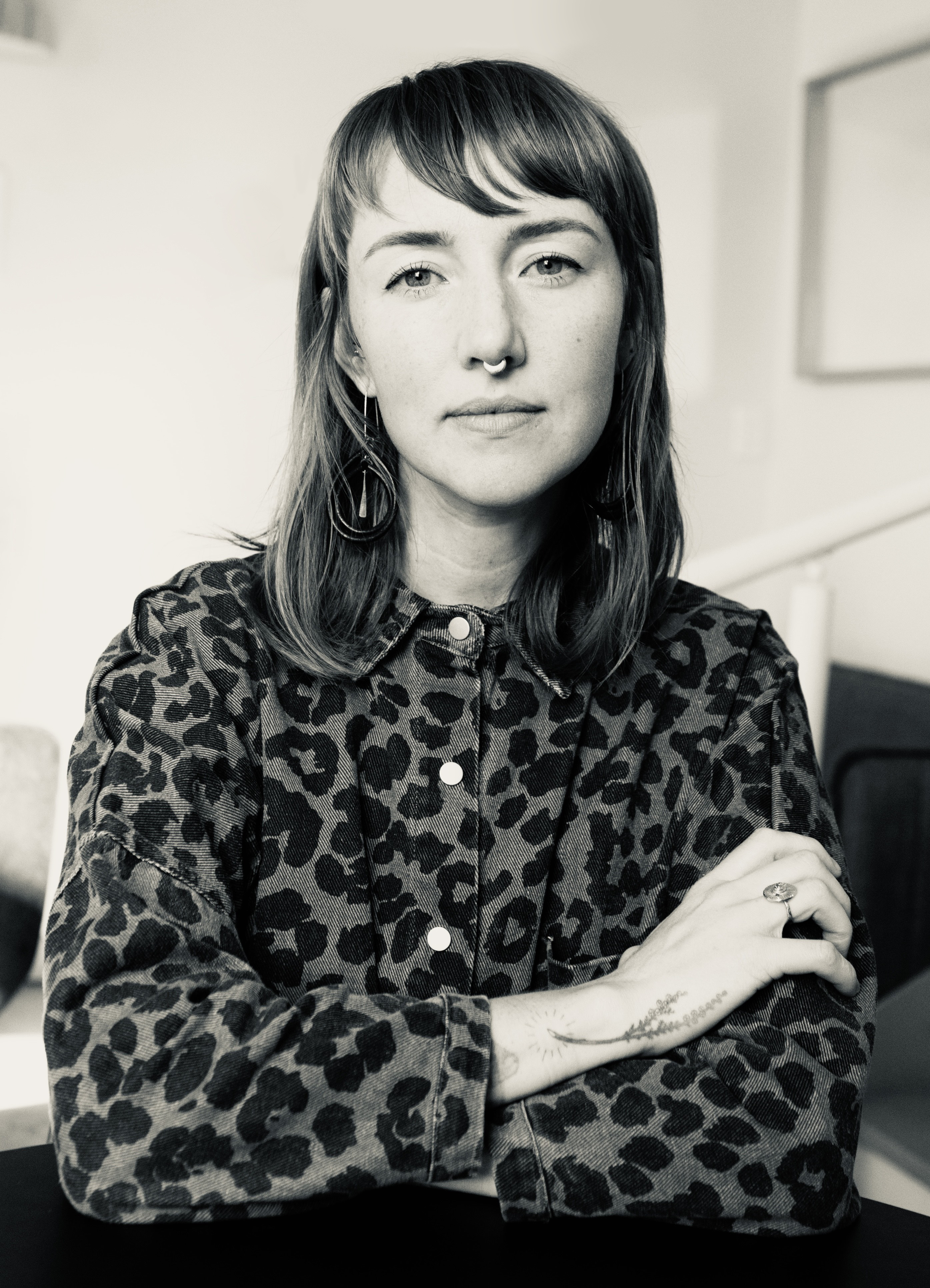
- Burnet in 2024
- Education: Dalhousie University (BA); University of Toronto (MA); Dalhousie University (JD)
- Occupations: Novelist; musician; lawyer
- Website: www.jaimeburnet.com

Jaime Burnet is a Canadian writer, musician, and lawyer from Nova Scotia, whose 2025 novel milktooth was longlisted for the Carol Shields Prize for Fiction, was a finalist for a Lambda Literary Award, and won the Thomas Raddall Atlantic Fiction Award and a Golden Crown Literary Society Award for General Fiction in 2026.

== Education and career ==
Burnet attended Dalhousie University in Halifax, where she earned a Bachelor of Arts in 2008. She continued her studies at the University of Toronto where she earned a Master of Arts in Women & Gender Studies and Sexual Diversity Studies in 2009, then returned to Dalhousie where she earned a Juris Doctor in 2016. She practices law in Halifax at Pink Larkin, specializing in labour and human rights law.

== Writing ==
Her debut novel, Crocuses Hatch from Snow, was published by Vagrant Press in 2019. In 2020, the book was shortlisted for the Thomas Raddall Atlantic Fiction Award and the ReLit Award for fiction.

Her second novel, milktooth, was published in April 2025 by Vagrant. In 2026, the book was longlisted for the Carol Shields Prize for Fiction, named a finalist for the Lambda Literary Award for Lesbian Fiction and the Golden Crown Literary Society's Goldie Award for General Fiction, and shortlisted for the Thomas Raddall Atlantic Fiction Award.

milktooth won the Thomas Raddall Atlantic Fiction Award, announced at the Atlantic Book Awards gala in Halifax, Nova Scotia. The jury called milktooth "a breathtaking account of the insidiousness of intimate partner abuse and the immense strength and difficult untangling required to escape," and said "Burnet has incredible skill, building momentum from the first page, and reaching a narrative climax that is extremely moving. Sorcha's first steps toward freedom, despite her fear and doubt, are stunningly captured on the page."

milktooth also won the Golden Crown Literary Society's Goldie Award for General Fiction, announced at the Society's annual conference in Orlando, Florida.

== Music ==
Burnet was the vocalist for the Halifax-based queer punk band Eekum Seekum, formed in 2011. She currently performs as part of the band SALTLAMP.

In 2013, Burnet and her friend Kaleigh Trace received internet attention for their parody song of Blurred Lines by Robin Thicke entitled Ask First. The song was co-written by Burnet and Trace while they were both working at Venus Envy, a sex shop and book retailer in Halifax.

== Publications ==
=== Books ===
- Burnet, Jaime (2019). Crocuses Hatch From Snow. Halifax, N.S.: Vagrant Press. ISBN 978-1-7710-8790-2.
- — (2025). milktooth. Halifax, N.S.: Vagrant Press. ISBN 978-1-7747-1364-8.

=== Short fiction ===
- Burnet, Jaime (2022). "Whisper Porn". The Malahat Review. No. 218.
