= Russell Wangersky =

Canadian journalist and writer of fiction and creative non-fiction

- Born: 1962 (age 63–64); Connecticut
- Occupations: Writer, journalist
- Writing career
- Genres: Non-fiction, creative non-fiction, fiction
- Notable works: Burning Down the House, Whirl Away

Russell Wangersky is a Canadian journalist and writer of fiction and creative non-fiction. Born in New Haven, Connecticut, and raised in Canada since the age of three, Wangersky was educated at Acadia University. He has been page editor of The Telegram in St. John's, as well as a columnist and magazine writer.

He has been nominated for the National Newspaper Award four times, and has won once, as well as several Canadian awards for creative non-fiction writing. He is also a four-time National Magazine Award finalist.

He published his debut short story collection, The Hour of Bad Decisions, in 2006. The collection was named to the initial longlist for the 2006 Scotiabank Giller Prize, and was also a finalist for the Winterset Award, the Commonwealth Writers First Book Prize - Canada and the Caribbean, and the Danuta Gleed Literary Award. His book Burning Down the House: Fighting Fires and Losing Myself, a non-fiction memoir of his 20 years as a volunteer firefighter, was released in Canada by Thomas Allen Publishers in March 2008. It was a finalist for the Writers' Trust Non-Fiction Prize, and won British Columbia's National Award for Canadian Non-Fiction, the Edna Staebler Award for Creative Non-Fiction, the Drummer-General Prize for Non-Fiction and the Rogers Television Newfoundland and Labrador Non-Fiction Prize.

His 2011 novel The Glass Harmonica won the 2011 Winterset Award. His 2012 short story collection Whirl Away was a shortlisted nominee for the 2012 Scotiabank Giller Prize, and won the 2013 Thomas Head Raddall Award.

Jason Buxton adapted "Sharp Corner", from Whirl Away, into the 2024 feature film Sharp Corner.
