= Charlene Carr =

Canadian writer

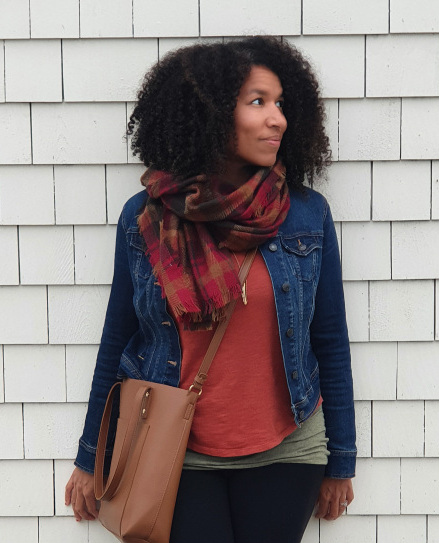
- Carr in 2022
- Occupation: Writer
- Writing career
- Genre: Fiction
- Notable works: Hold My Girl (2023); We Rip the World Apart (2024)
- Notable awards: Dartmouth Book Award for Fiction (2025)
- Website: www.charlenecarr.com

Charlene Carr is a Canadian writer based in Nova Scotia. Carr's novel We Rip the World Apart was the winner of the Dartmouth Book Award for Fiction at the Atlantic Book Awards in 2025.

== Biography ==
Carr was raised in Toronto as the youngest of four children, and is based in Nova Scotia. She graduated from Crandall University with a Bachelor of Arts in English, followed by Dalhousie University with a Master of Arts in English, and finally the University of King's College with a Bachelor of Journalism.

Carr's first novel with a major publisher, Hold my Girl (2023) was variously published by HarperCollins, Sourcebooks Landmark, and Welbeck Publishing. The book was shortlisted for the Thomas Raddall Atlantic Fiction Award and the Dartmouth Book Award, and was an Amazon Editor's pick for best literature and fiction. Hold my Girl was also optioned for a television adaptation in 2022 by the production company Blink49 Studios. Following the release of Hold my Girl, Carr was listed amongst "6 Black Canadian writers to watch" by CBC Books in February 2023.

In 2025, Carr's novel We Rip the World Apart (2024) was the winner of the Dartmouth Book Award for Fiction at the Atlantic Book Awards.

== Publications ==
- Carr, Charlene (2014). Where There is Life. St. John's, NL: Coastal Lines. ISBN 978-0-9939-2381-4. OCLC 995579439.
- — (2014). Skinny Me. St. John's, NL: Coastal Lines. ISBN 978-0-9939-2388-3. OCLC 995485355.
- — (2015). Beneath the Silence. St. John's, NL: Coastal Lines. ISBN 978-0-9939-2386-9. OCLC 995535858.
- — (2016). Behind Our Lives: A Tale of Life and Love in Three Parts. St. John's, NL: Coastal Lines. ISBN 978-1-9882-3205-8. OCLC 966404532.
- — (2016). Before I Knew You: A Novella Full of Thought, Heart, and Hope. St. John's, NL: Coastal Lines. ISBN 978-1-9882-3204-1. OCLC 1017753612.
- — (2023). Hold My Girl: A Novel. Naperville, Illinois: Sourcebooks Landmark. ISBN 978-1-7282-7041-8. OCLC 1356458157.
- — (2024). We Rip the World Apart. Toronto, ON: HarperCollins. ISBN 978-1-4434-6836-7. OCLC 1394915707.

== Recognition ==
- Atlantic Book Awards: Dartmouth Book Award for Fiction (2025)
