= Linda Little =

Canadian author (born 1959)

Linda Little (born 1959) is an author from Nova Scotia, Canada. Her third work of fiction has been praised as a "darkly beautiful novel".

== Writings ==
Her first novel, Strong Hollow published in 2001, is a coming-of-age story set in the Maritimes that features a same-sex romance. Quill & Quire praised the rich characters and Little's ability to make them "transcend stereotypes", but criticized Little for "mistrust[ing] the reader to understand the symbolism at the heart of her story".

In 2006, she followed up with Scotch River, which won three Atlantic Book Awards for that year, including the Thomas Head Raddall Award for best adult fiction. Like in her first novel, Little tells a story set in her familiar home of Nova Scotia. The novel tells the story of an Alberta ranch hand who moves to the fictional town of Scotch River. Quill & Quire praised her sympathetic characters and sensuous writing.

Her third novel, Grist, again takes place in the Maritimes but is set in the late 19th and early 20th centuries. Published in 2014, it tells the story of Penelope and her slowly disintegrating marriage to a miller. Quill & Quire compared the work to Thomas Hardy and Lucy Maud Montgomery, and praised it as a "darkly beautiful novel".

Little has also published a number of short stories and a children's book, Work and More Work. Kirkus criticized the narration of Work and More Work as "bare" and the story as overly idealized.

== Personal life ==
She was born and raised in Hawkesbury, Ontario, a small town in the Ottawa Valley. She earned her bachelor's degree in History from Queens University, and her Masters from Memorial. She also has a Masters in English from Dalhousie.

Little lives on a hobby farm in River John, Nova Scotia. She helps organize the annual Read by the Sea literary festival in the village, and, since 2005, has taught at the Dalhousie University Agricultural Campus in Truro, Nova Scotia. In 2007, she was the writer-in-residence for the Pictou-Antigonish Regional Library.
