= Oisin Curran =

Canadian writer

- Occupation: Writer
- Writing career
- Genre: Fiction
- Notable work: Blood Fable (2017)
- Notable awards: Thomas Head Raddall Award (2018)

Oisin Curran is a Canadian writer based in Nova Scotia. He was the winner of the Thomas Raddall Atlantic Fiction Award at the 2018 Atlantic Book Awards for his book Blood Fable, and is married to Sarah Faber, a fellow Nova Scotia writer who was nominated for the same award.

== Biography ==
Curran was born in Maine, and is based in Nova Scotia. He is married to fellow Nova Scotia writer Sarah Faber, with whom he has two children. Both Curran and Faber were nominated for the Thomas Raddall Atlantic Fiction Award at the Atlantic Book Awards, Curran for his book Blood Fable and Faber for her book All Is Beauty Now. The award was ultimately won by Curran.

Curran's book Blood Fable was one of 20 titles in a Canadian literature vending machine at the Billy Bishop Toronto City Airport in 2018, as part of a program funded by the federal Department of Canadian Heritage. In 2019, Curran taught a creative writing course at Cape Breton University.

== Publications ==
- Curran, Oisin (2008). Mopus. Counterpath Press. ISBN 978-1-9339-9604-2. OCLC 163707196.
- — (2017). Blood Fable. Toronto, ON: BookThug. ISBN 978-1-7716-6294-9. OCLC 973792520.
- — (2021). Wenn ich jetzt nicht weine (in German). Germany: Luftschacht Verlag. ISBN 978-3-9030-8144-4. OCLC 1348601677. (Note: German translation of Blood Fable)

== Recognition ==
- Atlantic Book Awards: Thomas Raddall Atlantic Fiction Award for Blood Fable (2018)
