= Kaleigh Trace =

Canadian writer (born 1986)

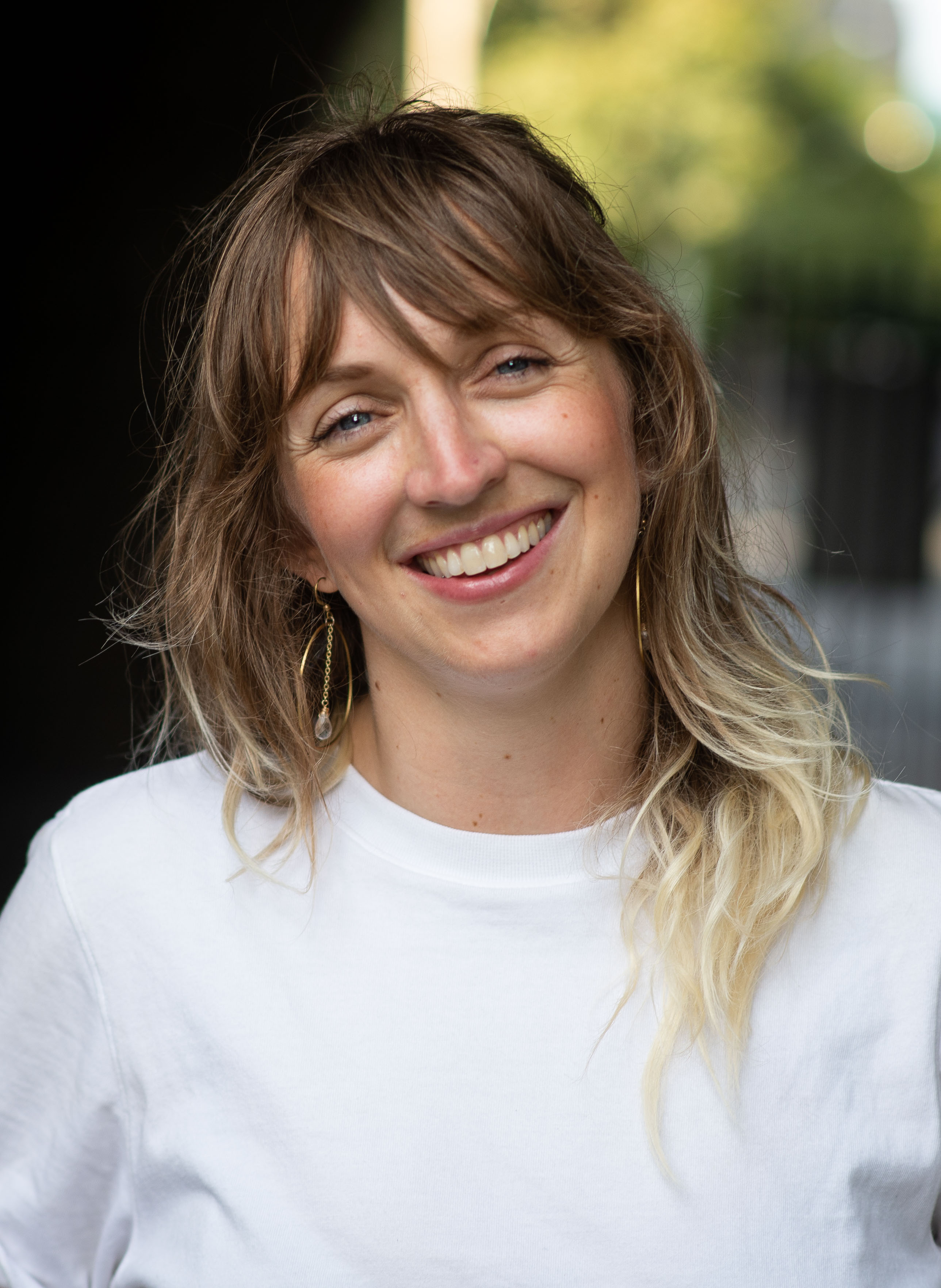
- Trace in 2019
- Born: 1986 (age 39–40)
- Education: Dalhousie University (BA); University of Guelph (MSc)
- Occupations: Writer; sex educator; therapist
- Writing career
- Genre: Non-fiction
- Notable works: Hot, Wet, and Shaking (2014)
- Notable awards: Evelyn Richardson Award (2015)

Kaleigh Trace (born 1986) is a Canadian writer, sex educator, and therapist based in Toronto, Ontario known for her candid discussions of sexuality and disability. Her 2014 memoir Hot, Wet, and Shaking: How I Learned to Talk About Sex, which chronicles her experiences as a disabled, queer, feminist sex educator, won the 2015 Evelyn Richardson Memorial Non-Fiction Award at the Atlantic Book Awards. Trace republished an updated edition of the memoir in 2024.

== Biography ==
Trace was born in 1986. She and her family experienced a car accident in 1995, which left her with a severe injury to her spinal cord. As a result of the accident, she spent part of her childhood in a wheelchair. She graduated from Dalhousie University with a Bachelor of Arts in 2009, and subsequently became employed at Venus Envy, a Canadian sex shop and book retailer, where her work included sex education. Trace credited her time at Venus Envy with expanding her knowledge on human sexuality. While working at Venus Envy, Trace began writing a blog, The Fucking Facts, in which she discussed deeply personal topics such as an abortion she had two years prior to starting the blog. Trace's blog would serve as inspiration her book Hot, Wet, and Shaking. In 2013, Trace received internet attention for her parody song of "Blurred Lines" by Robin Thicke entitled Ask First. The song was co-written by Trace and her friend Jaime Burnet while they were both working at Venus Envy.

Trace's book Hot, Wet, and Shaking was released in 2014. The memoir details her experience as a disabled, queer, feminist sex educator, exploring her personal story with sexuality through the lens of her spinal cord injury and work at Venus Envy. Through honest and humorous anecdotes, Trace challenges conventional narratives of sex, covering topics from struggles with orgasm and comical mishaps to serious issues like abortion and ableism. The book was the winner of the Evelyn Richardson Memorial Non-Fiction Award at the Atlantic Book Awards in 2015.

Trace remained employed at Venus Envy until moving to Toronto in 2017. She commuted to study at the University of Guelph, where she received her Master of Science in couples and family therapy. She worked at a Toronto therapy clinic, before eventually opening a private practice.

In October 2022, Trace was diagnosed with terminal bladder cancer. The same year, she was contacted by Invisible Publishing regarding the republication of a 10-year anniversary edition of Hot, Wet, and Shaking. Although she stated she was now "much more reluctant" to openly discuss her sex life, she agreed to the republication, calling the book a "much-needed celebration of sex". The republished book included a new introduction, as well as chapters reflecting her cancer diagnosis. For the launch of the 10-year anniversary edition, Trace hosted a performance event including standup comedy, games, and reading of short stories. The success of the event led to her hosting another performance called Little Deaths Salon in Toronto with Christa Couture in July 2025, returning on 17 October 2025 at the Buddies in Bad Times Theatre.

== Hot, Wet, and Shaking ==
Trace's memoir, Hot, Wet, and Shaking: How I Learned to Talk About Sex, was first published on 17 September 2014 by Invisible Publishing of Halifax, Nova Scotia. The book draws from Trace's experiences as a disabled, queer, feminist sex educator at Venus Envy, and was inspired by her blog, The Fucking Facts. The book explores her personal story with sexuality, shaped by a spinal cord injury from a car accident in 1995, through candid and humorous anecdotes. It addresses topics such as struggles with orgasm, abortion, ableism, and the complexities of sexual identity, challenging conventional narratives surrounding sex and disability. The book was praised for its balance of humour and emotion, noting Trace's ability to seamlessly transition between recounting comical mishaps and reflecting on serious topics.

In 2014, Hot, Wet, and Shaking was named the gold winner for best book by The Coast, a Halifax newspaper. The following year, the book was the winner of the Evelyn Richardson Memorial Non-Fiction Award at the 2015 Atlantic Book Awards. In 2017, it was listed among 150 Books of Influence by the Nova Scotia Library Association.

A German translation of the book was released in 2020, published by Orlanda Verlag of Berlin. The book was translated by Penelope Dützmann, a linguistics professor at the University of Cologne. It was presented at the 2021 Frankfurt Book Fair as part of Canada's Guest of Honor appearance in collaboration with the Canadian Embassy in Germany.

A 10th-anniversary edition of the book was published in 2024, also by Invisible Publishing. The revised edition includes a new introduction, as well as new chapters reflecting on Trace's cancer diagnosis two years prior to the republication, offering further insight into her evolving perspective on the topics of sex and mortality. Despite her initial reluctance to revisit the topics discussed in the book, Trace described it as a "much-needed celebration of sex". The same year, the book was listed on The Hamilton Review of Books' bestsellers list for July 2024.

== Publications ==
=== Books ===
- Trace, Kaleigh (2014). Hot, Wet, and Shaking: How I Learned To Talk About Sex. Halifax, N.S.: Invisible Publishing. ISBN 978-1-9267-4347-9. OCLC 1028583483.
- — (2020). Hot, Wet & Shaking: Wie ich lernte über Sex zu sprechen (in German). Translated by Dützmann, Penelope. Berlin, Germany: Orlanda Verlag. ISBN 978-3-9446-6661-7. OCLC 1348605874.
- — (2024). Hot, Wet, and Shaking: How I Learned To Talk About Sex (Tenth Anniversary ed.). Halifax, N.S.: Invisible Publishing. ISBN 978-1-7784-3046-6. OCLC 1464921208.

=== Selected articles ===
- Trace, Kaleigh (16 December 2014). "WILD ACTS: On Resistance in Sex and Body". GUTS Canadian Feminist Magazine. No. 3. Toronto, ON.
- — (Fall 2015). "Getting Down With Getting Off". Shameless Magazine. No. 30. Toronto, ON: Shameless Media.
- — (9 November 2016). "What a radical restructuring of Canada's health care system would look like". This Magazine. Toronto, ON: Red Maple Foundation.
- — (13 July 2017). "6 LGBTQ Canadians weigh in on being queer in 2017". CBC News (Canada 2017). Canadian Broadcasting Corporation.
