= Christy Ann Conlin =

Canadian writer

Christy Ann Conlin is a Canadian writer from Nova Scotia.

Originally from the Annapolis Valley region of Nova Scotia, she studied theatre at the University of Ottawa, education at Acadia University, and creative writing at the University of British Columbia. Her debut novel, Heave, was published in 2002, and was shortlisted for the Amazon.ca First Novel Award and the Thomas Head Raddall Award in 2003. She followed up with the young adult novel Dead Time in 2011, and her second adult novel The Memento in 2016.

Her first short story collection, Watermark, was published in 2019, and was a runner-up for the Danuta Gleed Literary Award in 2020.

Conlin's latest novel, The Speed of Mercy, was published in 2021.
