= Principles to Live By =

2016 novel by David Adams Richards

- First edition
- Author: David Adams Richards
- Language: English
- Genre: Novel
- Publisher: Doubleday Canada
- Publication date: 2016
- Publication place: Canada
- Media type: Print (hardback, paperback)
- ISBN: 978-0-385-68245-9
- Preceded by: Crimes Against My Brother

Principles to Live By is the 16th novel by Canadian writer David Adams Richards, published in 2016.

== Plot summary ==
The novel centres on John Delano, a Royal Canadian Mounted Police officer with a troubled personal life, who is investigating the cold case death of a young boy in 1999.

The novel includes a scene in which Richards pokes fun at his own earlier novel Nights Below Station Street, with people in a local bar dismissing it as a "dirty, ignorant novel" that "nobody in their right mind would want to read".
