= The Long Hot Summer (1985 film) =

Television film

- Genre: Drama; Romance
- Written by: William Faulkner (stories); Rita Mae Brown; Dennis Turner
- Directed by: Stuart Cooper
- Starring: Don Johnson; Jason Robards; Judith Ivey; Cybill Shepherd; William Russ; Ava Gardner
- Theme music composer: Charles Bernstein
- Country of origin: United States
- Original language: English

Production
- Executive producers: Leonard Hill; John Thomas Lenox
- Producer: Dori Weiss
- Production locations: Marshall, Texas; T.C. Lindsey & Co., Jonesville, Texas; The Myrtles Plantation - 7747 US Highway 61, St. Francisville, Louisiana; Ashland-Belle Helene Plantation - State Highway 75, Geismer, Louisiana; Elysian Fields, Texas; Oak Alley Plantation - 3645 Highway 18, Vacherie, Louisiana; Thibodaux, Louisiana
- Cinematography: Reed Smoot; Steve Yaconelli
- Editor: Daniel T. Cahn
- Running time: 200 min.
- Production companies: Leonard Hill Films; Long Hot Productions

Original release
- Network: NBC
- Release: October 6 – October 7, 1985

The Long Hot Summer is a 1985 American made-for-television romantic drama film starring Don Johnson. It is a remake of the 1958 film of the same name.

== Plot ==
Drifter Ben Quick arrives in a small Mississippi town and Will Varner, a family patriarch, sees Ben as a better choice to inherit the family business than his only son Jody. Will tries to push Ben and his daughter Noel into marriage. Noel is initially reluctant to court Ben and Jody senses that Ben threatens his position.

== Cast ==
- Don Johnson as Ben Quick
- Jason Robards as Will Varner
- Judith Ivey as Noel Varner
- Cybill Shepherd as Eula Varner
- Ava Gardner as Minnie Littlejohn
- William Russ as Jody Varner
- Wings Hauser as Wilson Mahood
- Alexandra Johnson as Agnes Stewart
- Stephen Davies as Alan Stewart
- Charlotte Stanton as Mrs. Stewart
- Albert Hall as Armistead Howlett
- William Forsythe as Isaac
- James Gammon as Billy Quick
- Rance Howard as Wilk
- Irma P. Hall as Cecilia Howlett
