= William Ping =

Canadian writer

William Ping is a Canadian writer from St. John's, Newfoundland and Labrador, whose debut novel Hollow Bamboo was a shortlisted finalist for the 2023 Amazon.ca First Novel Award and the 2024 Thomas Head Raddall Award.

Born and raised in St. John's, he is the grandson of William Seto Ping, a Chinese immigrant who became a prominent leader in the city's Chinese-Canadian community. However, his grandfather died when he was only a child, leaving him with few memories of the man for whom he was named; the novel is an autofiction in which a ghost named Mo guides a fictionalized version of himself into the past to learn more about his grandfather's life. The novel was written as Ping's master's thesis in creative writing studies at Memorial University of Newfoundland, under the supervision of Lisa Moore, before being published in early 2023 by HarperCollins Canada.

He has also contributed short stories to anthologies, including Us, Now: Stories from the Quilted Collective and Hard Ticket: New Writing Made in Newfoundland.

Ping works as a newsreader for CBN, the CBC Radio One affiliate in St. John's. He also previously created a radio documentary about his grandfather for CBC's Atlantic Voice documentary program.
