= Christa Couture =

Canadian musician and writer

- Born: Peterborough, Ontario, Canada
- Occupations: Broadcaster; musician; writer
- Notable work: How to Lose Everything (2021)
- Website: christacouture.com

Christa Couture is a Canadian broadcaster, musician, and writer based in Toronto. As a touring singer-songwriter for over 10 years, Couture released a variety of music surrounding the themes of grief and loss. Her 2021 memoir How to Lose Everything chronicles the profound losses in her life including childhood cancer, subsequent leg amputation, and the loss of her two infant sons. Couture is the host of the AMI television series Postcards From..., and previously hosted a summer season of CBC's Now or Never.

== Early life ==
Christa Couture was born in Peterborough, Ontario. Her family moved to Florida after she was born, and then to Edmonton, Alberta when she was four years old. Couture was diagnosed with Ewing sarcoma, a form of bone cancer, at the age of 11, and her left leg was amputated above the knee at the age of 13 to stop the cancer. Growing up in Edmonton, she studied musical theatre in high school and sang in choirs.

After graduating from high school, Couture attended the Vancouver Film School for one year. She worked as a production coordinator for 10 years before her music career began to gain momentum.

== Music career ==
Couture was a touring singer-songwriter for over 10 years. Her first three albums recounted her battle with cancer, the amputation of her leg, and the death of her two children. Her 2008 album The Wedding Singer and the Undertaker won a Canadian Aboriginal Music Award.

Her next album, The Living Record, was released in 2012. Produced by Steve Dawson, Couture performed the album live on tour with Vancouver-based duo Redgy Blackout, travelling across Canada to a variety of music festivals. In 2017, The Living Record was included on The Georgia Straight's list of "50 albums that shaped Vancouver".

In 2016, she released her album Long Time Leaving, examining the "ordinary heartache" of a breakup. The album was produced by Steve Dawson and recorded at his Henhouse studio in Nashville.

In 2020, Couture released Safe Harbour in preparation for the release of her memoir. Comprising six songs and lasting about 17 minutes in total, Couture described her music as "woven through [her] book", with her most significant life experiences each inspiring a song. She described Safe Harbour as "not so much a companion as the next step" to her book.

== Memoir ==
Couture's debut memoir, How to Lose Everything, was published by Douglas & McIntyre in 2021. The book recounts profound losses in her life such as the amputation of her leg as a child, the consecutive deaths of her two infant sons, a divorce, and thyroid cancer. Couture navigates these traumas across 12 non-linear chapters, blending a light, humorous tone with raw depictions of grief, pain, and complex topics like abortion and sexuality. 188 pages in total, the book is adorned with floral endpapers and a cover designed by Dianne Robertson. The Canadian musician Grant Lawrence included How to Lose Everything on his list of "best B.C. books of 2020" in the North Shore News.

How to Lose Everything inspired a 5-part series on CBC Gem featuring animated short films by Indigenous artists. The series features the work of Terril Calder, who animated the second episode; Chief Lady Bird, who created an animation for the poet Tara Williamson's Heart Like a Pow Wow for the third episode; Meky Ottawa, who directed and animated the fourth episode; and Megan Kyak-Monteith, who directed and animated the fifth episode.

== Television, radio, and performance ==
Couture is the host of the AMI television series Postcards From..., an accessible travel show. In 2024, she hosted the summer season of The Next Chapter for CBC Radio. She has contributed to CBC's Now or Never, and hosted a program on 106.5 Elmnt FM in Toronto.

In July 2025, Couture co-hosted Little Deaths Salon, a performance event in Toronto, with the Canadian writer Kaleigh Trace. The event returned on 17 October 2025 at the Buddies in Bad Times Theatre.

== Discography ==
=== Albums ===
- Fell Out of Oz (2005)
- The Wedding Singer and the Undertaker (2008)
- The Living Record (2012)
- Long Time Leaving (2016)
- Safe Harbour (2020)

=== EPs ===
- Loved (2011)
- Lost (2011)
- Unearthed (2021)

=== Singles ===
- To Us (2021)

== Publications ==
=== Books ===
- Couture, Christa (2021). How to Lose Everything. Vancouver, B.C.: Douglas & McIntyre. ISBN 978-1-7716-2290-5.

=== Essays and articles ===
- Couture, Christa (2014). "These Are My Children". In Clare, Kerry (ed.). The M Word: Conversations about Motherhood. Fredericton, N.B.: Goose Lane Editions. ISBN 978-0-8649-2487-2.
- — (2014). "Wallflower, Late Bloomer". Room. Vancouver, B.C.
- — (1 January 2017). "Canada is celebrating 150 years of... what, exactly?". Canada 2017. Canadian Broadcasting Corporation.
- — (11 April 2018). "I Couldn't Find Any Disability Maternity Photos, So I Made My Own". CBC Parents. Photography by Jen Squires. Canadian Broadcasting Corporation. Archived from the original on 18 February 2022.
