= Sharp Corner =

2024 Canadian thriller film

- Film poster
- Directed by: Jason Buxton
- Written by: Jason Buxton
- Based on: "Sharp Corner" by Russell Wangersky
- Produced by: Paul Barkin; Jason Buxton; Jason Levangie; Susan Mullen; Marc Tetreault
- Starring: Ben Foster; Cobie Smulders
- Cinematography: Guy Godfree
- Edited by: Jorge Weisz
- Music by: Stephen McKeon
- Production companies: Alcina Pictures; Shut Up and Colour Pictures; Workhorse Pictures
- Distributed by: Elevation Pictures (Canada)
- Release date: September 6, 2024 (TIFF)
- Running time: 110 minutes
- Countries: Canada; Ireland
- Language: English

Sharp Corner is a 2024 thriller film written and directed by Jason Buxton. Based on the 2012 short story by Russell Wangersky, the film stars Ben Foster as Josh McCall, a man who becomes obsessed with saving car accident victims at the sharp road corner near his home. It is produced by Paul Barkin, Marc Tetreault, Jason Levangie, Susan Mullen, and Buxton.

== Plot ==
A family — consisting of husband Josh, wife Rachel, and 6-year-old son Max — moves into a new house. One night, a car swerves off the road and crashes into a tree in their front yard, unsettling the family and Josh in particular.

Josh is revealed to have been passed up for a promotion at work, which Rachel attributes to an unambitious attitude. Josh continues to watch the road in front of the family's house, fixated. Eventually there is another car accident, and Josh watches the man in the car die from his injuries. Josh takes the dead man's phone and looks through its contents. He attends the man's funeral, at which he has a conversation with the man's adult daughter, giving her the false impression that he knew the man well. The daughter says she tries to remind herself that everything is in God's plan and that there's a purpose to people's suffering. Josh subtly refutes this idea, suggesting that people are just in the "wrong place at the wrong time."

Josh proceeds to learn CPR and to buy a CPR doll. Rachel, disturbed by the car accidents and concerned for the mental health of Max, wants to sell the house and relocate.

There is another accident in front of the house, which Josh comes across as he is driving home with Max. He sees a body being loaded onto a stretcher and CPR being administered, and he is told to move aside. During a therapy session, Josh regrets not being there to save the victim and insists that the victim would still be alive if he had been there to help when the crash first occurred.

Josh and Rachel put the house up for sale, but Josh secretly repels potential buyers. Josh is soon fired from his job and is divorced by Rachel.

One night, during a bout of rain, Josh notes the slipperiness of the road in front of the house. He further wets the road with a hose and saws down a road sign, indicating that he desires another car to crash. After a short while that night, there is another accident. Josh saves the woman from the overturned car and administers CPR, successfully resuscitating her.

== Cast ==
- Ben Foster as Josh
- Cobie Smulders as Rachel, Josh's wife
- William Kosovic as Max
- Gavin Drea as Erikson
- Alexandra Castillo as Tamara
- Jonathan Watton as Peter
- Reid Price as Drew
- Leah Johnston as Kate
- Andrew Shaver as Ben
- Bob Mann as Stephen
- Allison Wilson-Forbes as Eva
- Wayne Burns as Tim
- Gita Miller as Alicia
- Eugene Sampang as Alan
- David Light as Chad
- Steve Lawrence as Howard
- Emily Jewer as Collins
- Ryan Willis as carnival worker
- Susan Leblanc-Crawford as mourning mother

== Production ==
Buxton's second feature film following Blackbird in 2012, the film entered the development process in the late 2010s, with its screenplay included in the International Financing Forum at the 2017 Toronto International Film Festival.

It was filmed in 2023 in the Halifax, Nova Scotia, area.

== Release ==
The film was screened for distributors at the 2024 Berlin Film Market, and premiered at the 2024 Toronto International Film Festival.

It was subsequently screened at the 2024 Atlantic International Film Festival, where it won the awards for Best Atlantic Canadian Feature and Best Atlantic Canadian Director. In October 2024, it was showcased at the 19th Rome Film Festival.

In November 2024, Vertical acquired the United States distribution rights for the film and was released on May 9, 2025.

== Critical reception ==
On the review aggregator website Rotten Tomatoes, 92% of 50 critics' reviews are positive, with an average rating of 6.8/10. The website's consensus reads: "Putting Ben Foster's talent for playing men on the edge to good dramatic use, Sharp Corner is an unsettling psychological thriller that might make audiences crack from nerves even before its anxious antihero." Metacritic, which uses a weighted average, assigned the film a score of 76 out of 100, based on six critics, indicating "generally favorable" reviews.

Christian Blauvelt of IndieWire graded the film a B, writing, "What's so thrilling about Sharp Corner, Jason Buxton's atmospheric descent into madness, is how strongly it refuses to explain itself. There are a lot of different readings you could apply here, but there's still a pervasive novelistic ambiguity that defies any one interpretation."

Matt Zoller Seitz of RogerEbert.com gave the film four out of four stars and wrote, "Apart from its meticulous deconstruction of a family coming apart, Sharp Corner is memorable for its thoughtful compositions, which put a lot of information into each frame at different planes of distance and let us decide where to look. The camera moves a lot, but mostly slowly, and always for a reason: to reveal or conceal something, or fill us with anxiety. Guy Godfree's cinematography has a mid-'70s American New Wave feeling. It's rich and clear even in dark scenes, but never ostentatiously beautiful. Every shot is about making you feel as if you live in this little world."

Kristy Puchko's Mashable review concludes: "Focused so intently on the inner turmoil of its ego-ravaged hero, Sharp Corner is leanly executed. But Buxton and Wangersky seems to lose faith in their audience in the second act, offering a sequence where a psychiatrist basically spells out what Josh is going through (though she's not knowingly talking about him). Despite this detour, the finale regains momentum. Ultimately, a smart premise is poignantly brought to life by Foster and Smulders, making for a psychological thriller that is nerve-rattlingly tense and a family drama that is unapologetically gutting."
