= The Coming of Winter =

1974 novel by David Adams Richards

- First edition
- Author: David Adams Richards
- Language: English
- Genre: Novel
- Publisher: Oberon Press
- Publication date: 1974
- Publication place: Canada
- Media type: Print (hardback, paperback)
- Followed by: Blood Ties

The Coming of Winter is a novel by Canadian writer David Adams Richards, published in 1974. It is his debut novel. It was published after an excerpt from the novel won the Norma Epstein Prize for unpublished writing by Canadian university students.

The novel centres on Kevin Dulse, a young man going through a difficult period as he approaches his 21st birthday.

The novel was subsequently reissued as part of the New Canadian Library series.
