= Evening Snow Will Bring Such Peace =

1990 novel by David Adams Richards

- Author: David Adams Richards
- Language: English
- Series: Miramichi trilogy
- Genre: Novel
- Publisher: McClelland and Stewart
- Publication date: 1990
- Publication place: Canada
- Media type: Print (hardback, paperback)
- Preceded by: Nights Below Station Street
- Followed by: For Those Who Hunt the Wounded Down

Evening Snow Will Bring Such Peace is a novel by David Adams Richards, published in 1990. It is the second volume in his Miramichi trilogy, along with the novels Nights Below Station Street (1988) and For Those Who Hunt the Wounded Down (1993).

The novel centres primarily on Ivan and Cindi Bastarache. Their troubled marriage begins to disintegrate when Cindi, who has epilepsy, injures herself during a fight with Ivan over money, leading their family and friends to believe that Ivan has committed domestic violence against her.

The novel won the Canadian Authors Association award for fiction in 1991.
