= Loose Lips (novel) =

1999 novel by Rita Mae Brown

- Author: Rita Mae Brown
- Language: English
- Series: Runnymede
- Genre: Fiction, Domestic Fiction, Comedy, Women's literature
- Published: 1999 (Random House Publishing)
- Publication place: United States
- Preceded by: Bingo
- Followed by: The Sand Castle

Loose Lips is a 1999 novel by Rita Mae Brown. It is the third book in her Runnymede series.

== Plot synopsis ==
Brown returns to an earlier time in the annals of the fictional small town of Runnymede and the Hunsenmeir sisters. The year is 1941, the bickering sisters, Wheezie and Juts, are approaching middle age, and dealing with life issues of marriage, motherhood, family relationships and aging. Juts is desperate to have a child, but her husband, Chessy, may be infertile. Among the personal issues faced by the sisters and those surrounding them: Chessy's affair, the return of their long-lost father, Juts' relationship with Josephine, her unforgiving mother-in-law, and the adoption of Nicole by Juts and Chessy.

In the aftermath of Pearl Harbor, the residents of Runnymede face new challenges: civil defense, racism against the only Japanese resident of Runnymede, and other events, both comic and dramatic, such as mistaking migrating Canada geese for German bombers, and how the sisters open the Curl n' Twirl salon to pay off a debt due to damage caused by one of their fiercest fights.

The narrative spans a decade in the life of the sisters and the zany inhabitants of Runnymede, ending in 1950, with Wheezie and Juts feeling older and wiser, and just as dedicated as ever to their fractious relationship.

== Characters ==
- Wheezie and Juts Hunsenmeir: The continually quibbling sisters, who lead the madcap adventures of the town of Runnymede. Wheezie is upset at reaching the age of forty, while Juts is upset at her inability to have a child.
- Chessy Smith: Husband of Juts, has an affair with dance teacher Trudy Archer.
- Nicole "Nickel" Smith: Adopted daughter of Juts and Chessy.
- Mary: Wheezie's daughter, facing the scandal of teen pregnancy.
- Cora Hunsenmeir: Mother of Wheezie and Juts, maid and friend of Celeste Chalfonte.
- Josephine Smith: Juts' judgmental and unforgiving mother-in-law.
- Hansford Hunsenmeir: Long-lost father of Wheezie and Juts, husband of Cora.
- Celeste Chalfonte: Beautiful, willful, aristocratic woman, in her middle sixties. In a 39-year relationship with Ramelle.
- Ramelle Chalfonte: Celeste's long-term partner, and the wife of Celeste's brother, Curtis.

== Reception ==
Chicago Tribune critic, Michael Bolden, celebrates the return to the "fascinating" town of Runnymede. Though he finds the novel to fall flat at times, is forgiving due to the entertainment Loose Lips provides: "Brown's comedy is like a visit with relatives whose behavior both amuses and horrifies you. At times, you can't help but laugh aloud, and when the spectacle ends, you understand the people a little more, even if you think they're crazy." Similarly, the Kirkus review enjoyed the return to the familiar and beloved Runnymede and its "wacky" denizens and found that Loose Lips is filled with "vivid characters and strong women. The frequent one-liners often seem more sitcom than novel material, going nowhere and telling less, but there are still good laughs along the way."

The Denver Post positively describes the Hunsenmeir sisters as women who "insist on grabbing life by the throat. ('Life can't pass us by,' says Juts. 'We ARE life.')," yet finds the characters to be "self-indulgent - more sitcom characters than people you want to like," in spite of Brown's "sharp dialogue." Critic Sybil Downing concludes that "although Loose Lips is light and generally forgettable, Brown's keen observations on life and its comedic side so often edged by tragedy make it worth the read."
