= Road to the Stilt House =

1985 novel by David Adams Richards

- Author: David Adams Richards
- Language: English
- Genre: Novel
- Publisher: Oberon Press
- Publication date: 1985
- Publication place: Canada
- Media type: Print (hardback, paperback)
- Preceded by: Lives of Short Duration
- Followed by: Nights Below Station Street

Road to the Stilt House is a novel by David Adams Richards, published in 1985. The novel centres on Arnold, a teenage boy living in poverty in the Miramichi Valley of New Brunswick, the setting of most of Richards' novels.

The novel was a shortlisted finalist for the Governor General's Award for English-language fiction at the 1985 Governor General's Awards.
