= Wayne Johnston (writer) =

Canadian writer

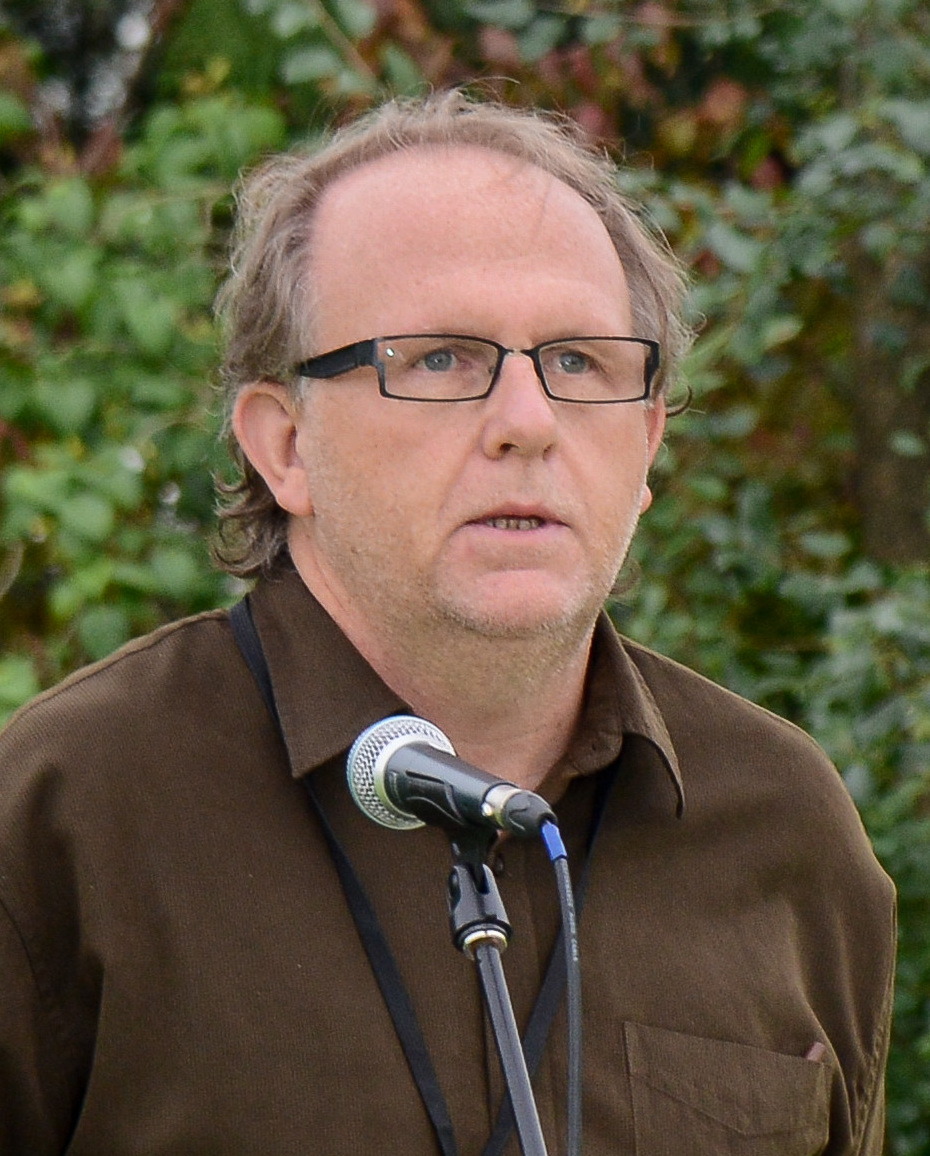
- Wayne Johnston at the Eden Mills Writers' Festival in 2013
- Born: 22 May 1958 (age 68); Goulds, Newfoundland, Canada
- Occupation: Novelist
- Writing career
- Genre: Historical fiction
- Notable work: The Colony of Unrequited Dreams
- Website: waynejohnston.ca

Wayne Johnston (born May 22, 1958) is a Canadian novelist. His fiction deals primarily with the province of Newfoundland and Labrador, often in a historical setting. In 2011 Johnston was awarded the Writers' Trust Engel/Findley Award in recognition of his contribution to Canadian literature.

== Early life and education ==
Johnston was born on May 22, 1958, in Goulds, Newfoundland, and graduated from Memorial University of Newfoundland in 1978 with a bachelor's degree in English. He worked for three years as a reporter for the St. John's Daily News.

In 1981, he moved to Ottawa and began to pursue writing full-time. He graduated with an MA from the University of New Brunswick in 1983.

== Career ==
=== Fiction ===
His first novel, The Story of Bobby O'Malley—which was written while he was a graduate student—won the SmithBooks/Books in Canada First Novel Award in 1985.

His second novel, The Time of Their Lives, won the Air Canada/Canadian Authors Association Award for Most Promising Young Canadian Writer in 1988. His novel won the 1991 Thomas Head Raddall Award and was subsequently adapted into a film of the same name. Johnston wrote the screenplay for the film, which won best screenplay in the Atlantic Film Festival and was nominated for an ACTRA Award.

Johnston's breakthrough novel, 1998's The Colony of Unrequited Dreams, was shortlisted for both the Giller Prize and the Governor General's Award for English-language fiction. It was acclaimed for its portrayal of historical Newfoundland politician Joey Smallwood. The Colony of Unrequited Dreams was adapted into a play by Robert Chafe. The novel was chosen for the 2003 edition of CBC Radio's Canada Reads competition, where it was championed by politician Justin Trudeau.

Johnston's The Custodian of Paradise, published in 2006, tells the story of Sheilagh Fielding, a fictional character originally introduced in The Colony of Unrequited Dreams. In 2002, Johnston published The Navigator of New York, a historical novel about the race by Robert Peary and Frederick Cook to reach the North Pole; it was shortlisted for both the Giller Prize and the Governor General's Award for English-language fiction. The Custodian of Paradise (2006), A World Elsewhere (2011), and The Son of a Certain Woman (2013) were longlisted for the Giller Prize.

Johnston was awarded the Writers' Trust Engel/Findley Award in recognition of his contribution to Canadian literature in 2011. In April 2014, Johnston was shortlisted for the Stephen Leacock Memorial Medal for Humour for his novel The Son of a Certain Woman.

In 2017, his novel First Snow, Last Light was released, with the fictional character Sheilagh Fielding returning for the third time. In 2021, he published The Mystery of Right and Wrong. The Novice of Holloway Hall was published in 2026, and was longlisted for the 2026 Giller Prize.

=== Non-fiction ===
Johnston has also published non-fiction. His Baltimore's Mansion (1999), is a memoir about his father and grandfather. It won the inaugural Charles Taylor Prize.

His 2022 memoir Jennie's Boy recounts his childhood in Newfoundland and won the 2023 Stephen Leacock Memorial Medal for Humour.

=== Academic appointments ===
For the spring of 2002, Johnston was the Writer-in-Residence at Hollins University in Roanoke, Virginia. He returned to Hollins University in 2004 as the Distinguished Chair in Creative Writing, a position he held until 2009.

In 2009, his lecture at the University of Alberta was published as the 48-page book The Old Lost Land of Newfoundland: Family, Memory, Fiction and Myth in the Henry Kreisel Lecture Series. Johnston has delivered a number of lectures at institutions including the John Adams Institute in the Netherlands.

== Honours and awards ==
- 1985 SmithBooks/Books in Canada First Novel Award for The Story of Bobby O'Malley
- 1988 Air Canada/Canadian Authors Association Award for Most Promising Young Canadian Writer
- 1991 Thomas Head Raddall Award for The Time of Their Lives
- 1999 Charles Taylor Prize for Baltimore's Mansion
- 2003 Doctor of Letters from the University of New Brunswick
- 2007 Doctor of Letters from Memorial University of Newfoundland
- 2011 Writers' Trust Engel/Findley Award
- 2023 Stephen Leacock Memorial Medal for Humour for Jennie's Boy

== Bibliography ==
=== Novels ===
Wayne Johnston talks about A World Elsewhere on Bookbits radio.

- The Story of Bobby O'Malley (1985)
- The Time of Their Lives (1987)
- The Divine Ryans (1990)
- Human Amusements (1994)
- The Colony of Unrequited Dreams (1998)
- The Navigator of New York (2002)
- The Custodian of Paradise (2006)
- A World Elsewhere (2011)
- The Son of a Certain Woman (2013)
- First Snow, Last Light (2017)
- The Mystery of Right and Wrong (2021)
- The Novice of Holloway Hall (2026)

=== Memoir ===
- Baltimore's Mansion (1999)
- Jennie’s Boy (2022)

=== Short stories ===
- )"Catechism". The Walrus. July 2005.
- "The Montreal Canadiens". Original Six: True Stories from Hockey's Classic Era. Edited by Paul Quarrington. Reed Books. 1996. ISBN 978-0-433-39752-6.
