= Brent Stait =

Canadian actor (born 1959)

- Born: September 9, 1959 (age 66); Snow Lake, Manitoba, Canada
- Occupation: Actor
- Years active: 1986–present

Brent Stait (born September 9, 1959) is a Canadian actor, best known for his roles as Rev Bem in the science fiction television series Andromeda and Louis Ferretti in Stargate SG-1.

== Biography ==
Stait was born in Snow Lake, Manitoba and grew up in The Pas. Though it is commonly said that Stait left Andromeda due to an allergic reaction to the prosthetics his character required, a 2011 interview revealed his departure was motivated by "physical exhaustion" from wearing the full Rev Bem costume.

Stait substituted for the body of Michael Kenmore in his Wraith form in the Stargate Atlantis episode "Allies", though Connor Trinneer continued to provide the voice. Trinneer returned to the full role after this singular episode as shown in "The Kindred (Part 1)".

Stait played DC Comics superhero Doctor Fate in Absolute Justice, a film that takes place inside the events of the ninth season of the Superman television series Smallville, the first live action appearance of the character. In the movie, Fate is allied with fellow members of the Justice Society and comes into conflict (and later alignment) with the Justice League. Brent Stait received very positive reviews for his portrayal.

He is also known for his portrayal of Nigel Ramsey in "The Wrath of Kali", a fourth season episode of Highlander: The Series.

== Filmography ==
=== Film ===
Year	Title	Role	Notes
1989	Termini Station	Burt	
1990	Cadence	Psych. Ward M.P. #2	
1991	Showdown at Williams Creek	Jim Blessing	
1992	North of Pittsburgh	Mechanic	
1994	Tokyo Cowboy	Vince	
1995	Far from Home: The Adventures of Yellow Dog	Sartech	
1995	Gunfighter's Moon	Walt Shannon	
1999	Mystery, Alaska	Kevin Holt	
2001	Touched by a Killer	Roger Walker	
2003	On the Corner	Wade	
2004	The Wild Guys	Donnie	
2009	Driven to Kill	Dino	
2009	Children of the Gods	Major Louis Ferretti	
2010	Hard Ride to Hell	Bob	
2010	The Tortured	U.S. Marshall	
2010	Hunt to Kill	U.S. Border Patrol Agent Walt	
2010	Tron: Legacy	Purple Gaming Program	
2011	Final Destination 5	Roy	
2011	Hamlet	Rosencrantz	
2012	Becoming Redwood	Border Guard	
2013	The Wedding Chapel	Major Mel Sommerville	
2014	Kid Cannabis	RCMP Officer	
2014	Sitting on the Edge of Marlene	Jack	
2014	Down Here	S.I. Steve Wiley	
2017	Hollow in the Land	Lenny	
2018	Rabbit	Father Day	

=== Television ===
Year	Title	Role	Notes
1986	Twelfth Night	Curio	Television film
1987	Married... with Children	Neighborhood Watch Member	Episode: "But I Didn't Shoot the Deputy"
1987, 1988	Night Heat	Carl / Donald Young	2 episodes
1988	Captain Power and the Soldiers of the Future	John	Episode: "The Eden Road"
1988	T. and T.	Dave	Episode: "Playing with Fire"
1988, 1989	Alfred Hitchcock Presents	Jim Sweeney	2 episodes
1989	Knightwatch	Tim	Episode: "Lost Weekend"
1989	Booker	Woody Kincaid	Episode: "Booker"
1989, 1990	21 Jump Street	Umpire / Tall Man	2 episodes
1989, 1991	Bordertown	Halton Hench / Bob Drake	2 episodes
1990	The Campbells	Jimmy Burke	Episode: "The Shiners"
1990	Broken Badges	Fast Eddie Faldo	Episode: "Strawberry"
1990	Wiseguy	Axel Whitman	Episode: "Dead Right"
1991	Monkey House	Corporal	Episode: "All the King's Horses"
1991	Omen IV: The Awakening	Mica	Television film
1991	I Still Dream of Jeannie	Eddie	Television film
1991	Secrets of the Unknown	Reverend Fuller	Episode: "Reverend Fuller Story"
1991	Le peloton d'exécution	Cpl. Bloggs	Television film
1992	Blind Man's Bluff	Billy Tomans	Television film
1992	The Man Upstairs	Mort	Television film
1992	Call of the Wild	François	Television film
1992, 1993	The Commish	B.B. Davenport / Frank McBride	2 episodes
1992, 1995	Highlander: The Series	Colonel Ramsey / Eddie Doyle	2 episodes
1993	Street Justice	Scott	Episode: "Hello... Again"
1993	Born to Run	Raymond	Television film
1993	Whose Child Is This? The War for Baby Jessica	Scott	Television film
1993	A Stranger in the Mirror	Peter Terriglio	Television film
1993, 1996	The X-Files	Corporal Taylor / Terry Edward Mayhew	3 episodes
1994	Cobra	Bridges	Episode: "Death Dive"
1994	Green Dolphin Beat	Jackson	Television film
1994	A Christmas Romance	O.T. Betsill	Television film
1995	Children of the Dust	Ballenger	2 episodes
1995	Hawkeye	Johnson	Episode: "Hester"
1995	Broken Trust	Evan Soika	Television film
1995	The Marshal	Officer Harris / Fitch	2 episodes
1995	Deceived by Trust: A Moment of Truth Movie	Larry Devore	Television film
1996	In the Lake of the Woods	Richard Thinbill	Television film
1996	The Limbic Region	Sheriff	Television film
1996	Titanic	Irish Bunkmate	2 episodes
1996	For Those Who Hunt the Wounded Down	Gary Percy Rils	Television film
1996–1999	The Sentinel	McBride / Miller	3 episodes
1997	Poltergeist: The Legacy	John Wesley Richter	Episode: "Finding Richter"
1997	Two	Jimmy	Episode: "Chain Gang"
1997	Hostile Force	Wendel Pone	Television film
1997	Intensity	Jim Woltz	Television film
1997	Five Desperate Hours	Danbury	Television film
1997	F/X: The Series	Brecht	Episode: "High Roller"
1997	Nights Below Station Street	Vye	Television film
1997, 1998	Stargate SG-1	Major Louis Ferretti	2 episodes
1998	Viper	Simon LeShane	Episode: "Hot Potato"
1998	Due South	Vic Hester	2 episodes
1998	Welcome to Paradox	Vincent Cloak	Episode: "Research Alpha"
1999	Roswell: The Aliens Attack	Capt. Phillips	Television film
1999	The Wonderful World of Disney	Ozone	Episode: "H-E Double Hockey Sticks"
1999	The Sheldon Kennedy Story	Mel Kennedy	Television film
1999	First Wave	Dan McGuire	Episode: "Prayer for the White Man"
1999	Seven Days	Edwin Brucks	Episode: "The Collector"
1999, 2000	The Outer Limits	Wayne / Vince Baxter	2 episodes
2000	The Virginian	Griffin	Television film
2000–2004	Andromeda	Rev Bem	36 episodes
2002	Mysterious Ways	Stan Amado	Episode: "Something Fishy"
2002	Taken	Sheriff Kerby	Episode: "Acid Tests"
2003	Cold Squad	John Watts	Episode: "Killing Time"
2003	A Crime of Passion	Alfred Barker	Television film
2004	Meltdown	FBI Commander Hall	Television film
2004	Battlestar Galactica	Mason	Episode: "Bastille Day"
2005	The Collector	Kommodant Ziereis	Episode: "The Historian'
2005	Into the West	Royce	Episode: "Dreams and Schemes"
2005	The 4400	Frank Venner	Episode: "Suffer the Children"
2006	Stargate Atlantis	Michael Kenmore	Episode: "Allies"
2006	A Job to Kill For	Roger Shapiro	Television film
2006	Blade: The Series	Damek	2 episodes
2006	Masters of Horror	John Reddle	Episode: "The Damned Thing"
2006–2020	Supernatural	Pool Hall Player / Rick / Scotty	3 episodes
2008	Fear Itself	Deputy / Guard Toomey	Episode: "Family Man"
2008	Sea Beast	Ben	Television film
2008	Trial by Fire	Crawford	Television film
2009	The L Word	Bob	Episode: "Leaving Los Angeles"
2009	Polar Storm	Guard Captain	Television film
2009	Beyond Sherwood Forest	Guy of Gisbourne	Television film
2010	Human Target	Potomac Electric Manager	Episode: "Baptiste"
2010	Smallville	Doctor Fate	2 episodes
2010	Stonehenge Apocalypse	Major Peatman	Television film
2010	Psych	Randy	Episode: "Viagra Falls"
2010	Shattered	SIU #2	Episode: "The Sins of Fathers"
2010	The Cult	Luke	Television film
2011	Ghost Storm	Thomas	Television film
2011	Fringe	Lieutenant Daniels	Episode: "Subject 9"
2011	The Pastor's Wife	Scott Bowden, OBP	Television film
2011	Sanctuary	Finn Noland	Episode: "Homecoming"
2013	Motive	Uncle Dave	Episode: "The One That Got Away"
2014	Arctic Air	Brent Hewson	Episode: "The Finish Line"
2014	When Calls the Heart	Pinkerton Richardson	5 episodes
2015	Killer Photo	Vincent Strurup	Television film
2015	Once Upon a Time	Peddler	Episode: "The Dark Swan"
2016	Who Killed My Husband?	Cpt. Sam Carter	Television film
2016	Legends of Tomorrow	Jeb Stillwater	Episode: "The Magnificent Eight"
2016	Newlywed and Dead	Bob Sloan	Television film
2016	Unclaimed	Farmer	Television film
2018	Hailey Dean Mysteries	Rob	Episode: "2 + 2 = Murder"
2018	Van Helsing	Dr. Karloff	Episode: "Super Unknown"
2018	Memories of Christmas	Mr. Henderson	Television film
2019	Morning Show Mysteries	Jerry	Episode: "A Murder in Mind"
2019	Past Never Dies	Timothy Past	Television film
2020	A Ruby Herring Mystery	George Fontana	Episode: "Prediction Murder"
2020	Christmas Forgiveness	Gary Biros	Television film
2020–2022	Snowpiercer	Tunnelman Jakes Carter	12 episodes
2021	Resident Alien	Roy the Cowboy	Episode: "Secrets"
2021	Love Stories in Sunflower Valley	Joe Francis	Television film
2021	Martha's Vineyard Mysteries	Sergeant Webber	Episode: "Poisoned in Paradise"
2021	Soccer Mom Madam	Big Pharma	Television film
2021	Chesapeake Shores	Bennet Sullivan	Episode: "Happy Trails"
2021	Under Wraps	Mr. Kubot	Television film
2021	A Christmas Treasure	Henry	Television film
2022	Big Lies in a Small Town	Sheriff Lester	Television film
2022	Time for Him to Come Home for Christmas	Slide Cunningham	Television film

== Awards and nominations ==
For his role of Gary Percy Rils in Those Who Hunt The Wounded Down, Stait was nominated in the 1998 Gemini Awards in the category of Best Performance by an Actor in a Featured Supporting Role in a Dramatic Program or Mini-Series.

In 2003 Stait won a Leo Award in the category of Best Guest Performance by a Male: Dramatic Series for his role in Cold Squad episode "Killing Time".
