= Michael Weir Foundation for the Arts =

Organization supporting excellence in the arts

The Michael Weir Foundation for the Arts is an organization that supports excellence in the arts, in memory of artist Michael Weir. The Michael Weir Foundation for the Arts sponsors awards that honour artistic excellence, including an annual award at the Atlantic Film Festival.

Michael Weir was raised in Swarthmore, Pennsylvania and lived in Halifax, Nova Scotia. He was an artist, writer, performer, and editor. He was an accomplished film editor, having been twice honored by the Atlantic Film Festival and nominated for the Academy of Canadian Cinema and Television's Genie Award.

== Atlantic Film Festival Michael Weir Award for Outstanding Atlantic Screenplay ==
Year	Winner	Film
2007	Chaz Thorne, Clement Virgo	Poor Boy's Game
2008	Justin Sims, Sherry White	Down to the Dirt
2009	Andrew Bush	Backshift
2010	Michael Amo	Whirligig
2011	Thom Fitzgerald	Cloudburst
2012	Jason Buxton	Blackbird
