= The Disappeared (2012 film) =

2012 film by Shandi Mitchell

- Directed by: Shandi Mitchell
- Screenplay by: Shandi Mitchell
- Produced by: Gilles Belanger; Ralph Holt; Walter Forsyth; Karen Franklin
- Starring: Billy Campbell; Shawn Doyle; Brian Downey; Gary Levert; Ryan Doucette; Neil Matheson
- Production company: Two Dories Film Inc.
- Release date: September 14, 2012 (Atlantic Film Festival)
- Country: Canada
- Language: English

The Disappeared is a Canadian drama film written and directed by author and filmmaker Shandi Mitchell. A story of survival and self-discovery for six men lost at sea in the North Atlantic, it stars Billy Campbell, Shawn Doyle, Brian Downey, Gary Levert, Ryan Doucette, and Neil Matheson.

The film premiered at the Atlantic Film Festival September 14, 2012.

== Plot ==
After their fishing boat sinks, six men in two small dories find themselves stranded in the middle of the North Atlantic Ocean. They have little food and fresh water. The film follows their physical and mental fatigue as the days pass and they try to get home again.

== Cast ==
- Billy Campbell as Mannie, First mate
- Shawn Doyle as Pete, Harpoon striker
- Brian Downey as Captain Gerald
- Gary Levert as Merv, Bosun
- Ryan Doucette as Gib, Cook and Spotter
- Neil Matheson as Dickie, Deck hand

== Production ==
Writer and director Shandi Mitchell got the idea for the script after speaking with a 92-year-old former sea captain who had once been lost at sea after his ship went down. Her resulting original script explores both physical and mental struggles of being lost at sea.

The film received support from Telefilm Canada, Film Nova Scotia, the Canada Council for the Arts, and the Nova Scotia Department of Communities, Culture and Heritage. The film was acquired by The Movie Network and Movie Central.

Filming of the movie took place in Lunenburg, Nova Scotia over a span of 15 days, beginning its shoot on September 12, 2011. As a film set at sea, the crew faced the challenge of how to film on water. To overcome this obstacle, a special 5 metre by 7 metre floating barge was built to house the film equipment and crew. Actors were ferried back and forth on zodiacs to hair and makeup artists as needed.

Actor Billy Campbell told media he found the shoot wasn't too taxing despite being in a row-boat for 15 days.

== Awards ==
On February 23, 2013, Shawn Doyle won Outstanding Performance–male for his performance in The Disappeared. at the 11th Annual ACTRA Awards in Toronto, February 23, 2013. The Disappeared was also nominated for two Canadian Screen Awards. Zander Rosborough and Allan Scarth were nominated for achievement in overall sound and Scarth, Bob Melanson, Rosborough and Cory Tetford were nominated for achievement in sound editing.

== Release ==
Acquired by Astral's The Movie Network and Corus Entertainment's Movie Central, The Disappeared received financial support from Telefilm Canada, Film Nova Scotia and the Canadian and Nova Scotia tax credit programs, and was developed with added support from the Canada Council for the Arts and the Nova Scotia Department of Communities, Culture and Heritage.

The film premiered at the Atlantic Film Festival to sold out audiences as the Atlantic Gala on September 14, 2012 at the Oxford Theatre in Halifax. The entire cast was reunited for the premiere.

The Disappeared is available to rent or buy on iTunes, Vimeo On Demand, and Amazon.com.

Film Festival	City	Date of screening	Theatre
Atlantic Film Festival	Halifax, Nova Scotia	September 14 (World Premiere) and September 15, 2012	Oxford Theatre
Cinéfest	Sudbury, Ontario	September 18, 2012	Silvercity Sudbury Cinemas
Calgary International Film Festival	Calgary, Alberta	September 25, 2012	Eau Claire Cineplex
Edmonton International Film Festival	Edmonton, Alberta	October 4, 2012	Empire City Centre 9
Vancouver International Film Festival	Vancouver, British Columbia	October 10 and October 11, 2012	Empire Granville 4
St. John's International Women's Film Festival	St. John's, Newfoundland and Labrador	October 19, 2012	LSPU Hall
