= Rita Mae Brown =

American writer, activist, and feminist (born 1944)

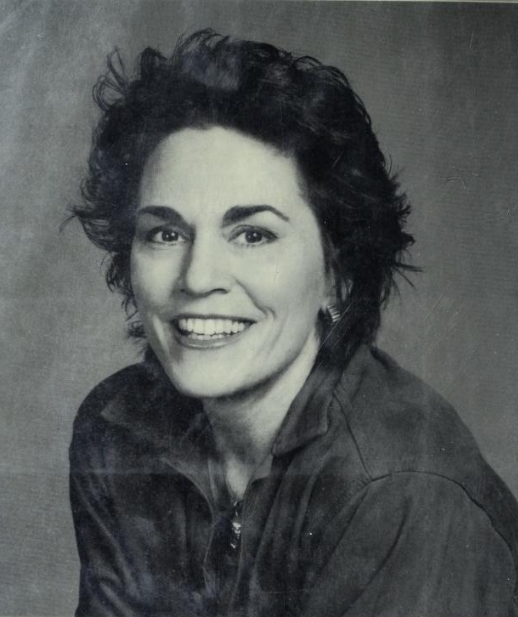
- Brown in 1998
- Born: November 28, 1944 (age 81); Hanover, Pennsylvania, U.S.
- Education: University of Florida; Broward College; New York University (BA); School of Visual Arts; Union Institute and University (PhD)
- Occupations: Novelist; poet; screenwriter; activist
- Partners: Fannie Flagg, Martina Navratilova
- Writing career
- Movements: LGBT rights, lesbian movement, feminism
- Website: ritamaebrownbooks.com

Rita Mae Brown (born November 28, 1944) is an American feminist writer, best known for her coming-of-age autobiographical novel, Rubyfruit Jungle. Brown was active in a number of civil rights campaigns and criticized the marginalization of lesbians within feminist groups. Brown received the Pioneer Award for lifetime achievement at the Lambda Literary Awards in 2015. She is considered a significant Southern lesbian feminist poet and author and is associated with the women's liberation movement and women in print movement.

== Biography ==
=== Early life ===
Brown was born in 1944 in Hanover, Pennsylvania, to an unmarried teenage mother and her married boyfriend. Brown's birth mother traveled with her cousin, Julia Brown, and Julia's husband Ralph to transport the baby girl from Hanover to Pittsburgh where they left her at an orphanage. Two weeks later, Julia, nicknamed Juts, and Ralph retrieved the infant from the orphanage, and raised her as their own in York, Pennsylvania, and later in Ft. Lauderdale, Florida. Julia and Ralph Brown were active Republicans in their local party.

=== Education ===
Starting in late 1962, Brown attended the University of Florida on a scholarship. In the spring of 1964, the administrators of the racially segregated university expelled her for participating in the civil rights movement. She subsequently enrolled at Broward Community College with the hope of transferring eventually to a more tolerant four-year institution.

=== Early career ===
Brown hitchhiked to New York City and lived there between 1964 and 1969, sometimes homeless, while attending New York University, where she received a degree in classics and English. In 1968, she received a certificate in cinematography from the New York School of Visual Arts. Brown worked as a photo editor at Sterling Publishing from 1969 to 1970.

Brown received a Ph.D. in literature from Union Institute & University in 1976 and holds a doctorate in political science. She was a lecturer in sociology at Federal City College from 1970 to 1971, a research fellow at the Institute for Policy Studies from 1971 to 1973, and visiting faculty at Goddard College beginning in 1973.

Brown wrote for Rat, an alternative bi-weekly that eventually became New York City's first women's liberation newspaper. She also contributed to Come Out!, the gay liberation newspaper in NYC, published by the Gay Liberation Front.

=== Later career ===
In 1982, Brown wrote a screenplay parodying the slasher genre titled Sleepless Nights; retitled The Slumber Party Massacre, the producers decided to play it seriously, and it was given a limited release theatrically. Brown is featured in the feminist history film She's Beautiful When She's Angry.

== Writings ==
Brown was associated with the women in print movement, which sought to establish autonomous communications networks of feminist publications, presses, and bookstores created by and for women. As part of The Furies Collective, Brown contributed to The Furies, a newspaper with a national circulation from 1972 to 1973. Brown also chose to publish her works through feminist presses. Her first novel, Rubyfruit Jungle, was published by Daughters, Inc. in 1973. Now considered a classic lesbian coming of age novel, it was an immediate success, selling 60,000 copies in two years, primarily through word of mouth. Rubyfruit Jungle had a comical, picaresque style that reviewers compared to Mark Twain. Brown published her second novel, In Her Day, through Daughters and her first poetry collection, The Hand That Cradles the Rock, with Diana Press Publications, another feminist publisher.

After the inaugural Women in Print Conference in 1976, Daughters, Inc. began to receive national attention, partly due to the success of Rubyfruit Jungle. Daughters founder June Arnold was a feminist separatist who believed that working with male collaborators and mainstream publishers would taint the cause of the women's liberation movement. However, soon after vowing in The New York Times that she would not sell reprint rights to a traditional publisher, Arnold sold the reprint rights for Rubyfruit Jungle to Bantam Books for $250,000. Brown was in favor of the sale due to the financial stability it provided her. Arnold and Daughters, Inc. were widely criticized in many feminist outlets.

Later in her career, Brown published her works with mainstream publishers, including Bantam and Ballantine Books, though she continued to engage with feminist themes across many genres, including historical fiction, mystery, and memoir. She is considered a significant Southern lesbian poet and writer.

== Philosophical and political views ==
In the spring of 1964, during her study at the University of Florida in Gainesville, she became active in the American Civil Rights Movement. Later in the 1960s, she participated in the anti-war movement, the feminist movement and the Lesbian Liberation movement. She was involved with the Student Homophile League at Columbia University in 1967 but left it because the men in the league were not interested in women's rights.

She was involved in the Redstockings, but also left the group because of its lack of involvement in lesbian rights. She then went on to join the Gay Liberation Front, where she suggested the formation of an all-lesbian group, since many of the women felt excluded from the feminist movement and the male-led gay liberation movement.

Brown took an administrative position with the fledgling National Organization for Women, but resigned in January 1970 over comments by Betty Friedan seen by some as anti-lesbian and by the NOW's attempts to distance itself from lesbian organizations. Brown claimed that lesbian was "the one word that can cause the Executive Committee [of NOW] a collective heart attack."

Brown played a leading role in the "Lavender Menace" zap of the Second Congress to Unite Women on May 1, 1970, which protested Friedan's remarks and the exclusion of lesbians from the women's movement. Brown and other lesbians from the Gay Liberation Front created The Woman-Identified Woman, which was distributed at the zap. The group that wrote the manifesto then went on to become the "Radicalesbians".

While doing work for the American Civil Rights Movement, Brown was introduced to consciousness-raising groups, which she incorporated into the organizations she created and the ones she worked in.

In the early 1970s, she became a founding member of The Furies Collective, a separatist lesbian feminist collective in Washington, DC that held that heterosexuality was the root of all oppression. The women wanted to create a communal living situation for radical feminists. The group purchased two houses, where they lived together and used consciousness raising techniques to talk about things like homophobia, feminism, and child rearing. They believed that being a lesbian was a political act, not just a personal one. Brown was exiled from The Furies after a few months and the group dismantled in 1972, a year after its inception.

When asked if she had ever really come out, she told Time in 2008,

I don't believe in straight or gay. I really don't. I think we're all degrees of bisexual. There may be a few people on the extreme if it's a bell curve who really truly are gay or really truly are straight. Because nobody had ever said these things and used their real name, I suddenly became the only lesbian in America. It was hysterical. It was a misnomer, but it's okay. It was a fight worth fighting.

Brown also does not consider herself a "lesbian writer" because she believes art is about connection and not about divisive labels. In a 2015 interview for The Washington Post, Brown was asked if she thought awards in gay and lesbian literature were important; she replied:

I love language, I love literature, I love history, and I'm not even remotely interested in being gay. I find that one of those completely useless and confining categories. Those are definitions from our oppressors, if you will. I would use them warily. I would certainly not define myself — ever — in the terms of my oppressor. If you accept these terms, you're now lumped in a group. Now, you may need to be lumped in a group politically in order to fight that oppression; I understand that, but I don't accept it.

== Honors, decorations, awards and distinctions ==
Brown received grants from the National Endowment for the Arts and the Massachusetts Arts Council to publish her novel Six of One.

In 1982, Brown was nominated for an Emmy for Outstanding Writing in a Variety or Music Program for I Love Liberty, and again for the ABC mini-series The Long Hot Summer in 1985.

She was co-winner of the 1982 Writers Guild of America Award for I Love Liberty, and the recipient of the New York Public Library's Literary Lion award of 1987.

In 2015, Brown was presented the Pioneer Award for lifetime achievement at the 27th Lambda Literary Awards.

In addition, Brown was nominated for an Audie award, and won both AudioFile Earphones and Publishers Weekly Listen-Up awards.

Brown received an honorary doctorate from Wilson College in 1992.

== Personal life ==
Starting in 1973, Brown lived in the Hollywood Hills in Los Angeles. In 1978, she moved to Charlottesville, Virginia, where she lived briefly with American actress, author, and screenwriter Fannie Flagg, whom she had met at a Los Angeles party hosted by Marlo Thomas. They later broke up due to, according to Brown, "generational differences", although Flagg and Brown are the same age.

In 1979, Brown met and fell in love with tennis champion Martina Navratilova. In 1980, they bought a horse farm in Charlottesville where they lived together until their breakup, over Navratilova's then concern that coming out would hurt her application for U.S. citizenship. Brown still lives on the estate in Charlottesville.

== Archives ==
The University of Virginia holds Brown's papers, which comprise 188 boxes. The collection includes manuscripts of Brown's writings, diaries, correspondence, personal papers, and legal files.

== Published works ==
=== Poetry ===
- "Dancing the shout to the true gospel or The song movement sisters don't want me to sing" was included in the 1970 anthology Sisterhood Is Powerful: An Anthology of Writings from the Women's Liberation Movement, edited by Robin Morgan.
- The Hand That Cradles the Rock (1971). ASIN B00JACY1TA
- Songs to a Handsome Woman (1973). ASIN B000MZAK26
- Poems (1987) ISBN 9780895942470

=== Novels ===
- Rubyfruit Jungle (1973) ISBN 0-553-27886-X
- In Her Day (1976) ISBN 0-553-27573-9
- A Plain Brown Rapper (June 1976) ISBN 0884470113
- Southern Discomfort (1983) ISBN 0-553-27446-5
- Sudden Death (1984) ISBN 0-553-26930-5
- High Hearts (1987) ISBN 0-553-27888-6
- Venus Envy (1994) ISBN 0-553-56497-8
- Dolley: A Novel of Dolley Madison in Love and War (1995) ISBN 0-553-56949-X
- Riding Shotgun (1996) ISBN 0-553-76353-9
- Alma Mater (2002) ISBN 0-345-45532-0

==== Runnymede books ====
- Six of One (1978) ISBN 0-553-38037-0
- Bingo (1988) ISBN 0-553-38040-0
- Loose Lips (1999) ISBN 0-553-38067-2
- The Sand Castle (2008) ISBN 0-8021-1870-4
- Cakewalk (2016) ISBN 0-5533-9265-4

=== Mysteries ===
Mrs. Murphy Mysteries

The Mrs. Murphy Mysteries include "Sneaky Pie Brown" as a co-author.

1. Wish You Were Here (1990) ISBN 978-0-553-28753-0
2. Rest in Pieces (1992) ISBN 978-0-553-56239-2
3. Murder at Monticello (1994) ISBN 978-0-553-57235-3
4. Pay Dirt (1995) ISBN 978-0-553-57236-0
5. Murder, She Meowed (1996) ISBN 978-0-553-57237-7
6. Murder on the Prowl (1998) ISBN 978-0-553-57540-8
7. Cat on the Scent (1999) ISBN 978-0-553-57541-5
8. Pawing Through the Past (2000) ISBN 978-0-553-58025-9
9. Claws and Effect (2001) ISBN 978-0-553-58090-7
10. Catch as Cat Can (2002) ISBN 978-0-553-58028-0
11. The Tail of the Tip-Off (2003) ISBN 978-0-553-58285-7
12. Whisker of Evil (2004) ISBN 978-0-553-58286-4
13. Cat's Eyewitness (2005) ISBN 978-0-553-58287-1
14. Sour Puss (2006) ISBN 978-0-553-58681-7
15. Puss n' Cahoots (2007) ISBN 978-0-553-58682-4
16. The Purrfect Murder (2008) ISBN 978-0-553-58683-1
17. Santa Clawed (2008) ISBN 978-0-553-80706-6
18. Cat of the Century (2010) ISBN 978-0-553-80707-3
19. Hiss of Death (2011) ISBN 978-0-553-80708-0
20. The Big Cat Nap (2012) ISBN 978-0-345-53044-8
21. Sneaky Pie for President (2012) ISBN 1410450244/ISBN 0345530470 — Not a Mrs. Murphy mystery
22. The Litter of the Law (2013) ISBN 978-0-345-53048-6
23. Nine Lives to Die (2014) ISBN 978-0-345-53050-9
24. Tail Gait (2015) ISBN 978-0-553-39236-4
25. Tall Tail (2016) ISBN 978-0-553-39246-3
26. A Hiss Before Dying (2017) ISBN 9780553392517
27. Probable Claws (2018) ISBN 9780425287170
28. Whiskers in the Dark (2019) ISBN 9780425287187
29. Furmidable Foes (2020) ISBN 9780593130032
30. Claws for Alarm (2021) ISBN 9780593130094
31. Hiss and Tell (2023) ISBN 9780593357545
32. Feline Fatale (2024) ISBN 9780593357637
33. Sealed With A Hiss(2025)ISBN 9780593874080

"Sister" Jane Mysteries

1. Outfoxed (2000) ISBN 0345484258
2. Hotspur (2002) ISBN 0345428234
3. Full Cry (2003) ISBN 0345465202
4. The Hunt Ball (2005) ISBN 0345465504
5. The Hounds and the Fury (2006) ISBN 0345465482
6. The Tell-Tale Horse (2007) ISBN 034550626X
7. Hounded to Death (2008) ISBN 0345512375
8. Fox Tracks (2012) ISBN 0345532996
9. Let Sleeping Dogs Lie (2014) ISBN 055339262X
10. Crazy Like a Fox (2017) ISBN 9780399178344
11. Homeward Hound (2018) ISBN 9780399178375
12. Scarlet Fever (2019) ISBN 9780593130001
13. Out of Hounds (2021) ISBN 9780593130063
14. Thrill of the Hunt (2022) ISBN 9780593357620
15. Lost and Hound (2023) ISBN 9780593357583

Mags Rogers Mysteries

1. A Nose for Justice (2010) ISBN 978-0-345-51182-9
2. Murder Unleashed (2010) ISBN 978-0-345-51183-6

=== Nonfiction ===
- Starting from Scratch: A Different Kind of Writer's Manual (1988). ISBN 055334630X
- Rita Will: Memoir of a Literary Rabble-Rouser (1997). ISBN 978-0553099737
- Sneaky Pie's Cookbook For Mystery Lovers (1999). ISBN 978-0553106350
- Animal Magnetism: My Life with Creatures Great and Small (2009). ISBN 978-0-345-51179-9

=== Screenplays ===
- I Love Liberty (1982; TV special)
- The Slumber Party Massacre (1982; feature film)
- The Long Hot Summer (1985; TV movie)
- My Two Loves (1986; TV movie)
- Me and Rubyfruit (1989; short film interpretation of Rubyfruit Jungle)
- Rich Men, Single Women (1990; TV movie)
- The Woman Who Loved Elvis (1993; TV movie)
- Mary Pickford: A Life on Film (1997; documentary)
- Murder She Purred: A Mrs. Murphy Mystery (1998; TV movie)

== See also ==
- Lesbian Poetry
