= Nights Below Station Street =

1988 novel by David Adams Richards

- Author: David Adams Richards
- Language: English
- Series: Miramichi trilogy
- Genre: Novel
- Publisher: McClelland and Stewart
- Publication date: May 1988
- Publication place: Canada
- Media type: Print (hardback, paperback)
- Preceded by: Road to the Stilt House
- Followed by: Evening Snow Will Bring Such Peace

Nights Below Station Street is a novel by David Adams Richards, published in 1988. It is the first volume in his Miramichi trilogy, along with the novels Evening Snow Will Bring Such Peace (1990) and For Those Who Hunt the Wounded Down (1993).

The novel centres on the Walshes, a rural New Brunswick family in the 1970s. Patriarch Joe has been only irregularly employed since injuring his back at work several years earlier, his wife Rita is concerned about his resulting struggles with alcoholism and depression while herself struggling to cope with being the family's sole breadwinner, and teenage daughter Adele is bitterly unhappy with the family's circumstances and resentful of her father's inability to hold steady work.

The novel won the Governor General's Award for English-language fiction at the 1988 Governor General's Awards.

The novel was adapted by Credo Entertainment Group as a television film, which aired on CBC Television in 1998. The cast included Liisa Repo-Martell as Adele Walsh, Lynda Boyd as Rita, Michael Hogan as Joe, and Brent Stait as Vye. It was also adapted for the stage by Caleb Marshall in 2006.

Richards directly pokes fun at himself in his 2016 novel Principles to Live By, in which several characters dismiss Nights Below Station Street as a "dirty, ignorant novel" that "nobody in their right mind would want to read".
