= For Those Who Hunt the Wounded Down =

1993 novel by David Adams Richards

- Author: David Adams Richards
- Language: English
- Series: Miramichi Trilogy
- Genre: Novel
- Publisher: McClelland and Stewart
- Publication date: 1993
- Publication place: Canada
- Media type: Print (hardback, paperback)
- Preceded by: Evening Snow Will Bring Such Peace
- Followed by: Hope in the Desperate Hour

For Those Who Hunt the Wounded Down is a novel by David Adams Richards, published in 1993. It is the final volume in his Miramichi trilogy, along with the novels Nights Below Station Street (1988) and Evening Snow Will Bring Such Peace (1990).

The novel centres on Jerry Bines, a charismatic but violent ex-convict, and his family.

The novel was a shortlisted finalist for the Governor General's Award for English-language fiction at the 1993 Governor General's Awards, and won the Thomas Head Raddall Award in 1994.

== Film ==
The novel was later adapted by Credo Entertainment Group into a television film, which aired on CBC Television in 1996.

The film adaptation, directed by Norma Bailey, starred Callum Keith Rennie as Jerry Bines, Brent Stait as Gary, Michael Hogan as Alvin, Nancy Beatty as Franny and Laura Harris as Lucy.

For the film's screenplay, Richards won a Gemini Award for Best Writing in a Dramatic Program or Mini-Series, and a Writers Guild of Canada Award.
