= Robert de la Chevotière =

Canadian author

- Born: Dominica
- Education: Mount Saint Vincent University
- Occupation: Writer, teacher
- Website: robdelabooks.com/home

Robert de la Chevotière is a writer and educator based in Halifax, Nova Scotia. de la Chevotière was born in Dominica and grew up in Guadeloupe and Bermuda before moving to Canada and his storytelling draws on his life experiences. His novel Tall is Her Body was published by Erewhon Books in 2025 and was nominated for the 2026 OCM Bocas Prize for Caribbean Literature. all is Her Body was selected as a recommended read and "best book" by NPR staff. His novel We Were Not Kings (2026) was shortlisted for the 2026 Thomas Raddall Atlantic Fiction Award, the Dartmouth Book Award, and selected as a 2025 summer book selection by CBC books. The novel, The Twelfth House, is due to be published in August 2026. de la Chevotière also writes poetry and his poem “Soliloquy” was nominated for the 2023 Vallum Poetry Award. His writing style and has been categorized as magical realism. He has been described as a "meticulous educator and storyteller." While de la Chevotière is fluent in English and French, he writes primarily in English. de la Chevotière has been an educator in the Halifax public school system for more than twenty years and currently teaches English and French language arts at West Bedford High School in Bedford, Nova Scotia.
