= Burning Down the House (memoir) =

Burning Down the House: Fighting Fires and Losing Myself
- First edition cover of Canadian release
- Author: Russell Wangersky
- Subject: Firefighting
- Genre: Non-fiction, memoir
- Publisher: Thomas Allen Publishers
- Publication date: April 2009
- Publication place: Canada
- Media type: Print (Hardcover & Paperback)
- Pages: 271 pp.
- ISBN: 9780887623295

Burning Down the House: Fighting Fires and Losing Myself is a non-fiction memoir, written by Canadian writer Russell Wangersky, first published in April 2009 by Thomas Allen Publishers. In the book, the author chronicles his experiences as a volunteer firefighter in Nova Scotia and Newfoundland.

== Awards and honours ==
Burning Down the House received the 2009 Edna Staebler Award for Creative Non-Fiction.
