= Bingo (novel) =

1988 novel by Rita Mae Brown

- Author: Rita Mae Brown
- Language: English
- Series: Runnymede
- Genre: Fiction, Women's literature, Lesbian literature, Bisexual literature
- Published: 1988 (Bantam Books)
- Publication place: United States
- Preceded by: Six of One
- Followed by: Loose Lips

Bingo is a 1988 novel by Rita Mae Brown. It is the second installation of the Runnymede series of books, following Six of One, which came out in 1978.

== Plot synopsis ==
Bingo takes place in the fictional small town of Runnymede, Maryland, which is located on both sides of the Mason-Dixon line. The events take place about seven years after the end of Six of One.

Nickel Smith is now the editor of the local Runnymede newspaper, The Clarion, which is under threat due to corporate takeover. Her mother, Juts, and her aunt Wheezie, the infamous Hunsenmeir sisters, try to keep an eye on Nickel, who has embarked on an affair that would shock the town. The sisters, who are prone to decades-long fights, find themselves newly at odds when a new eligible gentleman, Ed Tutweiler Walters, arrives in town. Nickel, on the other hand, feels she must take care of her aunts, but also has her hands full with her own troubles.

== Characters ==
- Nicole "Nickel" Smith: A bisexual journalist, adopted daughter of Juts and natural daughter of Chessy. Though she prefers women, she becomes pregnant by Jackson.
- Louise "Wheezie" and Julia "Juts" Hunsenmeir: Octogenarian sisters who are deeply devoted to each other, though constantly bickering and holding grudges.
- Ed Tutweiler Walters: Septuagenarian, a newcomer to Runnymede, has Juts and Wheezie in competition for his affections.
- Chessy: Nickel's estranged father.
- Jackson: Husband of Nickel's best friend, with whom she has an affair.
- Mr. Pierre: The only other openly LGBT person in Runnymede. He runs the Curl 'n Twirl beauty salon.

== The Runnymede series ==
- Six of One (1978), Harper & Row
- Bingo (1988), Bantam
- Loose Lips (1999), Bantam
- The Sand Castle (2008), Grove/Atlantic
- Cakewalk (2016), Bantam

== Reception ==
In the Kirkus review of Bingo, it is noted that "while Brown's feminist tenets are always cheerfully in evidence, this remains frothy entertainment--with an unreal-but-who-cares? sit-corn sensibility." Publishers Weekly called Bingo an "amusing, poignant tale" packed with "an astonishing number of characters and severed loyalties. Along with sketches of zany homegrown characters, Brown offers unpredictable plot resolutions that reinforce her reputation as a writer unafraid of new directions."

== Awards ==
Bingo was nominated for the 1988 Lambda Literary Award for Lesbian Fiction.
