= David Adams Richards =

Canadian writer and member of the Canadian Senate

The Honourable David Adams Richards CM ONB
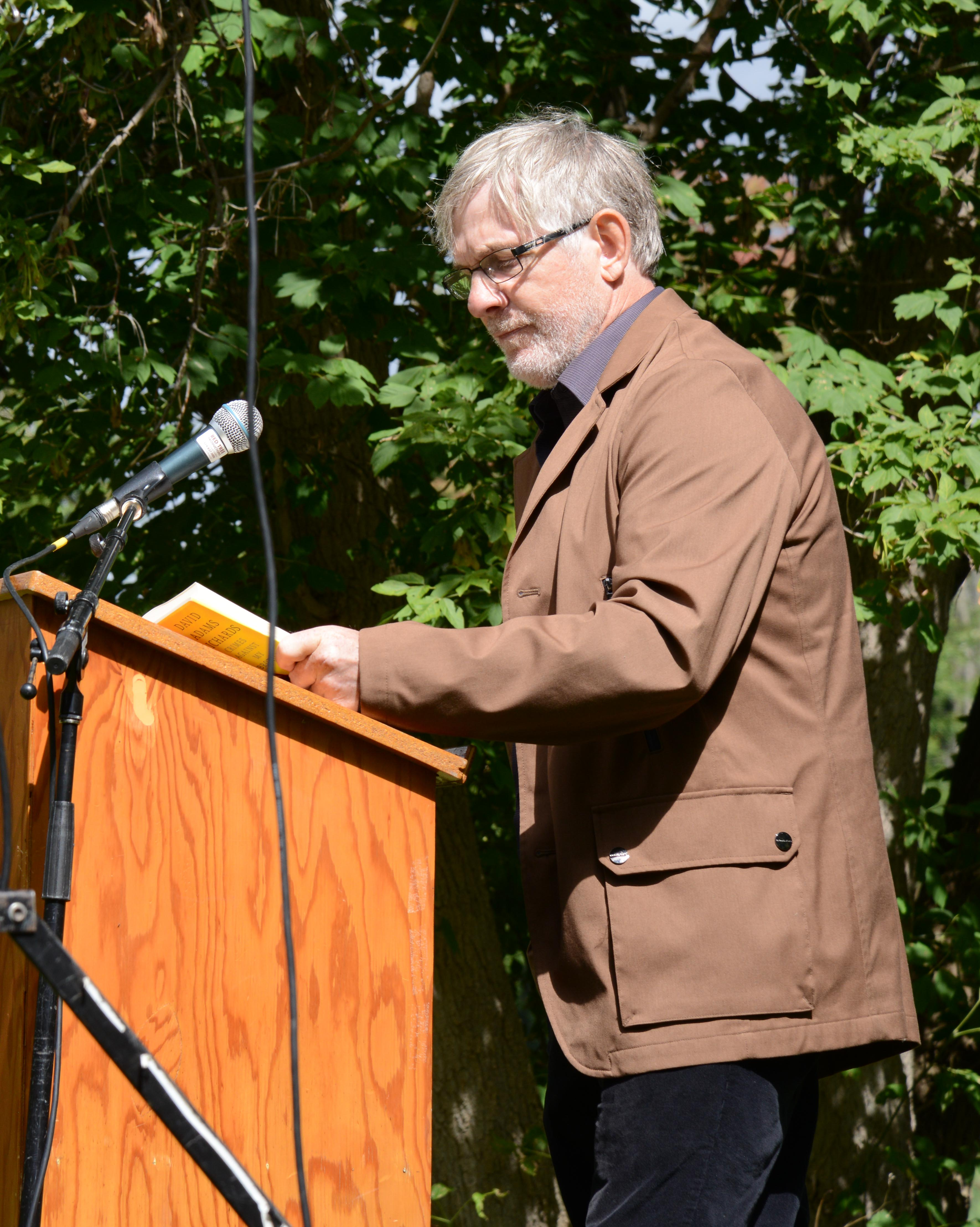
- Richards in 2014

Senator from New Brunswick
- In office 30 August 2017 – 17 October 2025
- Nominated by: Justin Trudeau
- Appointed by: David Johnston
- Preceded by: John D. Wallace

Personal details
- Born: 17 October 1950 (age 76) Newcastle, New Brunswick, Canada
- Party: Non-affiliated (2018–2019, 2024–2025); Conservative Party of Canada (2025–present)
- Other political affiliations: Canadian Senators Group (2019–2024); Independent Senators Group (2017–2018)
- Spouse: Peggy McIntyre
- Profession: Writer
- Awards: Governor General's Award; Gemini Award; Giller Prize; Honorary Doctorate

David Adams Richards (born 17 October 1950) is a Canadian writer and a former member of the Canadian Senate.

== Background ==
Born in Newcastle, New Brunswick, Richards left St. Thomas University in Fredericton, three credits shy of completing a BA. After publishing a poetry chapbook in 1972, he won the Norma Epstein Award, a literary prize for unpublished writing by Canadian university students, in 1974 for an excerpt from his novel manuscript The Coming of Winter, and the novel was published later that year as his fiction debut.

== Career ==
Over his career as a writer, Richards has published novels, stage plays, short stories and non-fiction work. His fiction typically addresses the lives and experiences of poor and working class residents of the Miramichi region of New Brunswick, exploring spiritual and philosophical themes influenced by Richards' Roman Catholic faith.

Richards has been a writer-in-residence at various universities and colleges across Canada, including the University of New Brunswick.

On 30 August 2017, the appointment of Richards to the Senate of Canada on the advice of Prime Minister Justin Trudeau was announced.

On 24 April 2018, Richards resigned from the Independent Senators Group to sit as an unaffiliated senator. Richards stressed that he had not felt pressured by the ISG, saying that he left because he wants a high degree of personal autonomy, citing how he never joined the Writers' Union of Canada or PEN Canada as an author. Richards also said that since Trudeau had appointed him as an independent, he felt it was his duty to be as independent as possible.

On 4 November 2019, he joined the Canadian Senators Group.

On 21 May 2025, he left the Canadian Senators Group to again sit as a Non-affiliated Senator.

On 3 June 2025, he joined the Conservative Party of Canada caucus. He retired from the Senate on 17 October 2025, upon reaching the mandatory retirement age of 75.

== Awards ==
Richards has received numerous awards including two Gemini Awards for scriptwriting for Small Gifts and For Those Who Hunt the Wounded Down, the Alden Nowlan Award for Excellence in the Arts, and the Canadian Authors Association Award for his novel Evening Snow Will Bring Such Peace. Richards is one of only three writers to have won in both the fiction and non-fiction categories of the Governor General's Award. He won the 1988 fiction award for Nights Below Station Street and the 1998 non-fiction award for Lines on the Water: A Fisherman's Life on the Miramichi. He was also a co-winner of the 2000 Giller Prize for Mercy Among the Children. The Writers' Federation of New Brunswick administers an annual David Adams Richards Prize for Fiction.

In 2009, he was made a Member of the Order of Canada "for his contributions to the Canadian literary scene as an essayist, screenwriter and writer of fiction and non-fiction".

In 2011, Richards received the Matt Cohen Prize.

In May 2025, he was the recipient of an Honorary Degree from McGill University for his prolific contributions to Canadian literature

== Publications ==
Richards' papers are currently housed at the University of New Brunswick.

In 2014, Halifax singer-songwriter Dan MacCormack released an album of songs inspired by Richards' novels, called Symphony of Ghosts. The title was taken from a line in Mercy Among the Children.

=== Novels ===
David Adams Richards talks about Incidents in the Life of Markus Paul on Bookbits radio.

- The Coming of Winter (1974)
- Blood Ties (1976)
- Lives of Short Duration (1981)
- Road to the Stilt House (1985)
- Nights Below Station Street (1988, winner of the 1988 Governor General's Award for fiction)
- Evening Snow Will Bring Such Peace (1990)
- For Those Who Hunt the Wounded Down (1993, nominated for a Governor General's Award, winner of the 1994 Thomas Head Raddall Award)
- Hope in the Desperate Hour (1996)
- The Bay of Love and Sorrows (1998)
- Mercy Among the Children (2000) (co-winner of the Giller Prize)
- River of the Broken-Hearted (2004)
- The Friends of Meager Fortune (2006) (longlisted for the Giller Prize)
- The Lost Highway (2007) (longlisted for the Giller Prize, Nominated Governor General's Awards 2008 Governor General's Award)
- Incidents in the Life of Markus Paul (2011)
- Crimes Against My Brother (2014)
- Principles to Live By (2016)
- Mary Cyr (2018)

=== Poetry ===
- Small Heroics (1972) (chapbook)

=== Plays ===
- The Dungarvon Whooper (1975)
- Water Carrier, Bones and Earth (1983)
- Hockey Dreams (2009)

=== Short stories ===
- Dancers at Night (1978)
- Dane (1978)

The Christmas Tree (2008)

=== Non-fiction ===
- A Lad From Brantford and Other Essays (1994)
- Hockey Dreams: Memories of a Man Who Couldn't Play (1996)
- Lines on the Water: A Fisherman's Life on the Miramichi (1998, winner of the 1998 Governor General's Award)
- Extraordinary Canadians: Lord Beaverbrook (2008)
- God is. (2009)
- Facing the Hunter: Reflections on a Misunderstood Way of Life (2011)
- Murder and Other Essays (2019)

=== General ===
- "Non-Judgmental Truth: An Interview with David Adams Richards" by Craig Proctor, Blood & Aphorisms (Winter 1998)

== Personal life ==
In 1971, Richards married Peggy McIntyre. They have two sons, John Thomas Richards and Anton Richards, and reside in Fredericton as of December 2012.
