= Shree Ghatage =

Shree Ghatage (born 1957) is a Canadian writer. She was born in Bombay, India and moved to Canada in 1983, settling in St. John's, Newfoundland and Labrador. She has won three awards in the Newfoundland and Labrador Arts and Letters Competition.

Her written works share a common theme, describing life in India based on her own memories and experiences. Ghatage's first book, Awake When All the World is Asleep (1997), a collection of short stories set in Bombay, was awarded the Thomas Head Raddall Award.

At the time of publication of her third book, Thirst (2012), Ghatage lived in Calgary, Alberta.

== Bibliography ==
- Awake When All the World Is Asleep (1997)
- Brahma's Dream (2005)
- Thirst (2012)

== Awards ==
- Thomas Raddall Atlantic Fiction Prize
- Shortlisted, Danuta Gleed Award, 1998
- Shortlisted, Newfoundland and Labrador Book Award, 1998
