= Blackbird (2012 film) =

- Film poster
- Directed by: Jason Buxton
- Written by: Jason Buxton
- Produced by: Marc Almon; Jason Buxton
- Starring: Connor Jessup; Alexia Fast; Michael Buie; Alex Ozerov; Craig Arnold; Tanya Clark
- Cinematography: Stéphanie Weber Biron
- Edited by: Kimberlee McTaggart
- Music by: Shehab Illyas
- Distributed by: Arti Film
- Release date: September 9, 2012 (TIFF)
- Running time: 103 minutes
- Country: Canada
- Language: English

Blackbird is a 2012 Canadian drama film written and directed by Jason Buxton. The film stars Connor Jessup as a socially isolated and bullied goth teenager who befriends his "puck bunny" classmate (Alexia Fast), but is falsely accused of plotting a school shooting after he makes a threat against her boyfriend in an online chat session.

== Plot ==
Sean Randall (Connor Jessup), a goth teenager, is a friend of classmate Deanna (Alexia Fast), with whom he rides the bus every day. Her boyfriend plays on an ice hockey team and she is friends with the team's other members. Sean's father has a gun collection, and Sean sometimes joins him when he goes hunting. Sean films his father shooting a deer and shows the footage to his schoolmates, which (when combined with his goth fashion sense) makes them think that he is creepy. The members of the hockey team bully Sean for being weird and for being friends with Deanna, which angers Sean.

Sean's teacher advises him to write down his feelings. He writes a revenge story about using his father's guns on the hockey team and Deanna, which he publishes on the Internet, although he has no real intention to harm anybody. He is put into a youth detention center, where inmates also bully him – especially Trevor (Alex Ozerov), who has served the longest time there after an incident as a child in which he killed a Santa Claus impersonator who displayed an inappropriate sexual interest in him. Sean is punished for lying about why he is in jail; the others steal his food and he is forced to fetch the ball whenever Trevor plays ping pong with the others.

Tired of Trevor, Sean crushes the ping pong ball and Trevor threatens to kill him. Sean then deliberately commits an offence by withholding some cutlery in order to be put in the isolation ward. To be released from the jail sooner, he reluctantly follows his lawyer's advice to plead guilty for planning a school shooting, even though he had no such plans. He is indeed released, under the condition that he does not have any contact with Deanna or the hockey team members. He avoids his previous goth look, but people still consider him weird and dangerous, and his car is vandalized.

Sean violates the condition of having no contact with Deanna and is arrested again. With his father's support, he decides to dismiss his lawyer and tell the truth, after which he is sentenced for perjury in the previous trial. He is returned to juvenile jail, where Trevor convinces one of his friends to murder Sean, but the attempt fails. Later on, it is Christmas time, which makes Trevor uncomfortable.

Sean angers Trevor by suggesting that the Santa Claus he killed might have thought that Trevor looked gay. This results in a fight, after which both of them are put in the isolation ward. Trevor is still very angry and hurts himself, causing increasing security measures by prison staff. Sean is relieved that Trevor is no longer in a position to bully him. One day, he does not have to stay in the isolation ward any longer, but prefers to and is allowed to stay while Trevor is still there. Sean begins to feel sympathy for him, and they reconcile.

== Cast ==
- Connor Jessup as Sean Randall
- Alexia Fast as Deanna Roy
- Michael Buie as Ricky Randall
- Alex Ozerov as Trevor
- Craig Arnold as Cory
- Tanya Clarke as Paula

== Reception ==
On the review aggregator website Rotten Tomatoes, 57% of seven critics' reviews are positive.

=== Awards and nominations ===
The film garnered two nominations at the 1st Canadian Screen Awards, for Best Original Screenplay (Buxton) and Best Editing (Kimberlee McTaggart). The film was also a co-winner, alongside Brandon Cronenberg's Antiviral, for the Best Canadian First Feature Film award at the 2012 Toronto International Film Festival. The film won three awards at that year's Atlantic Film Festival: Best Atlantic Feature, Best Atlantic Director, and the Michael Weir Award for Outstanding Atlantic Screenplay (sponsored by the Michael Weir Foundation for the Arts). and the Vancouver International Film Festival award for Best Canadian Film. It also won the 2013 Claude Jutra Award for the best Canadian film by a first-time film director.
