= Elisabeth de Mariaffi =

Canadian writer

- Occupations: short story writer, novelist, poet
- Writing career
- Period: 2010s–present
- Notable works: How to Get Along With Women, The Devil You Know

Elisabeth de Mariaffi is a Canadian writer, whose debut short story collection How to Get Along With Women was a longlisted nominee for the Scotiabank Giller Prize and a shortlisted nominee for the ReLit Award in 2013.

Her poetry and fiction have been published in literary magazines including CV2, Descant, The Fiddlehead, This Magazine and The New Quarterly. Her first poetry chapbook, Letter on St. Valentine's Day, was published in 2009. She holds an MFA in creative writing from the University of Guelph.

In 2015, she published her debut novel The Devil You Know.

Originally from Toronto, Ontario, she is currently based in St. John's, Newfoundland and Labrador. She also works as a writing mentor in the Master of Fine Arts in Fiction program at the University of King's College in Halifax, Nova Scotia.
