= Shandi Mitchell =

Canadian novelist and filmmaker

- Education: Dalhousie University
- Occupations: Novelist; filmmaker
- Writing career
- Notable awards: Thomas Head Raddall Award (2010); Kobzar Literary Award (2012)
- Website: www.shandimitchell.com

Shandi Mitchell is a Canadian novelist and filmmaker. Her first novel Under This Unbroken Sky won a 2010 Commonwealth Writers' Prize and other awards. She graduated from Dalhousie University.

Her newest novel, The Waiting Hours, is slated for publication in 2019.

== Awards and honors ==
- 2012: Kobzar Literary Award, Under This Unbroken Sky
- 2010: Commonwealth Writers' Prize (first novel, Canada and the Caribbean), Under This Unbroken Sky
- 2010: Thomas Head Raddall Award, Under This Unbroken Sky
- 2008: Victor Martin-Lynch Staunton Endowment in Media Arts, Canada Council

== Works ==
Literary

- 2011 - Under This Unbroken Sky (ISBN 978-0-06-177402-7)
- 2019 - The Waiting Hours

Film

- 2002 Baba's House (short)
- 2005 Tell Me (short)
- 2012 The Disappeared
