= The Colony of Unrequited Dreams =

1998 novel by Wayne Johnston

- Author: Wayne Johnston
- Language: English
- Publisher: Knopf Canada
- Publication date: September 30, 1998
- Publication place: Canada
- Pages: 562
- ISBN: 0676971822

The Colony of Unrequited Dreams is a novel by Wayne Johnston, published on September 30, 1998 by Knopf Canada. Johnston's breakthrough work, the novel was a Canadian bestseller, and was shortlisted for the 1998 Giller Prize and the 1998 Governor General's Award for English fiction.

In 2003, Justin Trudeau championed the book on CBC Radio's Canada Reads.

A work of historical fiction, the novel presents a fictionalized portrayal of real-life Newfoundland politician Joey Smallwood, the political leader who brought the province into Canadian Confederation in 1949. A major literary device in the novel is the intertwining of his life, since childhood, with (fictional) journalist Sheilagh Fielding.

A stage adaptation by Robert Chafe premiered in February 2015. It was nominated for the Governor General's Literary Award in 2017.

== Title ==
Johnston says the title of the book evokes

the nostalgia Newfoundlanders have felt for the possibilities of the island, and that they still have for the future. Joe is always searching for something commensurate with the greatness of the land itself, but he can't find it, and it's driving him mad...Newfoundland is that kind of place. It makes you want to live up to the landscape, but on the other hand it offers you no resources to do so. There's always this constant yearning that at least for my part helped me to start writing.
