= Six of One (novel) =

1978 novel by Rita Mae Brown

- First edition
- Author: Rita Mae Brown
- Language: English
- Series: Runnymede
- Genre: Fiction, Lesbian fiction, Women's fiction, Bisexuality
- Published: 1978 (Harper & Row)
- Publication place: United States
- Followed by: Bingo

Six of One is a 1978 novel by Rita Mae Brown. It is the first in her Runnymede series of books about a small town on the Mason-Dixon line and its sometimes eccentric residents. It is also the first of the Hunsenmeir trilogy, a subset of the Runnymede series, which focuses on the elderly Hunsenmeir sisters. According to Brown, the sisters are based on her own mother and aunt, who "do tend to dominate in a way", and the town is based on her own birthplace, about which she says: "It’s really interesting to have one foot in the North and one foot in the South."

== Synopsis ==
Six of One is set in Runnymede, a fictional Maryland town that straddles the Mason–Dixon line. The narrative moves back and forth in time, following a colorful cast of characters. Thirty-five-year-old Nickel (Nicole), a bisexual woman, is the first-person narrator. Her adoptive mother, Juts (Julia Ellen), and aunt Wheezie (Louise) Hunsenmeir have been quibbling and making up since they were small girls in 1908, the earliest part of the story. In 1980, the contemporary part of the novel, the sisters are in their 70s and still at it. Most of the characters are female, each with her own over-the-top propensities: Celeste Chalfonte murders the local weapons tycoon for principle, and shares her lover Ramelle with her brother. Cora, Celeste's servant and friend, illiterate, simple and hardworking, is the mother of the bickering Hunsenmeir sisters. Fannie Jump Creighton turns her aristocratic home into a speakeasy during prohibition, to survive the Great Depression. Events both minor and historic are treated with light humor, with only the occasional more serious tone.

== Characters ==
- Nicole "Nickel" Smith: First-person narrator, a young bisexual writer, who has returned to her home town to figure out her next step in life. Juts is her adopted mother.
- Louise "Wheezie" and Julia "Juts" Hunsenmeir: Boldly eccentric sisters. Wheezie and Juts spend their whole lives in Runnymede, deeply devoted to each other, though constantly bickering and holding grudges.
- Celeste Chalfonte: Headstrong and aristocratic, Celeste is the witty intellectual lesbian heiress, living with her beautiful young lover Ramelle in her mansion on the hill.
- Cora Hunsenmeir: Mother of Wheezie and Juts, and lifelong friend and servant of Celeste.
- Fannie Jump Creighton: Highly sexual and alcohol loving southern belle, who runs a speakeasy in her home.
- Ramelle Bowman: Celeste's long-term partner. Has a child with Celeste's brother, Curtis.

== The Runnymede series ==
- Six of One (1978), Harper & Row
- Bingo (1988), Bantam
- Loose Lips (1999), Bantam
- The Sand Castle (2008), Grove/Atlantic
- Cakewalk (2016), Bantam

== Reception ==
Susanna Rodell, in Harvard University's Crimson Review, writes that "Six of One is an attempt to construct a fictional feminist history of the 20th century in America, through the lives of women living in a small town in Maryland." She finds the book "fun", with dialog that is "rich and raunchy, often delightful". She does find the style of the novel "uneven", but only on an "essentially cosmetic" level.

The Kirkus review of Six of One states: "Though the march through time gets a little forced at times, Brown is always ready to bring us back to Runnymeade and its pranks... At her winning, fondest best, Brown has some of the same effervescent yet secure trust in her local characters that Eudora Welty feels for hers. Girls are more fun, seems to be the message; on the evidence of these here--no argument.

Amanda Bearse, writing for The Advocate, called Six of One "an easy and delightful read". In the Washington Post Book World, Cynthia McDonald raved about the book because "The vision of women we have usually gotten from women novelists is of pain and struggle or pain and passivity; it is seldom joyous and passionate, and almost never funny. And what humor there was has been of the suffering, self-deprecating New York Jewish stand-up comedian type. Six of One by Rita Mae Brown is joyous, passionate and funny. What a pleasure!"

== Awards ==
Brown received grants from the National Endowment for the Arts and the Massachusetts Arts Council to publish Six of One.
