= Venus Envy (novel) =

1993 novel by Rita Mae Brown

- Author: Rita Mae Brown
- Language: English
- Genre: Fiction, Comedy, Lesbian Literature
- Published: 1993 (Bantam Books)
- Publication place: US

Venus Envy is a 1993 novel by Rita Mae Brown.

== Plot Synopsis ==
Mary Frazier Armstrong, known to all as "Frazier", is a successful and beautiful 35-year-old art gallery owner. When she is diagnosed with terminal lung cancer and is told she has only hours left to live, she decides it is time to let everyone know what she really thinks. She writes a series of brutally honest letters to friends and family, and because she'll be dead by the time she reads them, she also tells her deepest secret: She's a lesbian.

When the letters arrive, chaos and pandemonium ensue in her hometown of Charlottesville, Virginia, peaking with the news that Frazier is not dying after all. As the society around her seeks to excoriate her for her sexual identity and those close to her are afraid to be painted with the same incriminating brush, only her father, brother, eccentric aunt, assistant and closest friend Billy stick by her. When the pressure grows too great, Frazier escapes, with the help of an accidental electric shock, to a fantasy visit into a 17th-century painting of Mount Olympus, only to wake up in the arms of the stunning and bisexual goddess Venus, and gets to hang out with the ancient, wiser goddesses and gods.

== Characters ==
- Mary Frazier Armstrong: A woman of wealth and social position, who creates a furor among her family and friends when she tells them exactly what she thinks of them, under the mistaken impression that she is on her deathbed.
- Libby Armstrong: Frazier's mother, whose bitterness has poisoned her daughter's life.
- Carter Armstrong: Frazier's brother, a sensitive, alcoholic, "redneck" type, whose self-destructiveness is a counterpoint and by-product of Frazier's success
- Ann: Frazier's secret romantic partner, who has a growing grudge regarding the limitations of their hidden life.
- Billy Cicero: Frazier's outrageous gay best friend.
- Mandy: Frazier's assistant at the art gallery, whose exhortation, "Don't die a stranger, Tell the people you love who you are" sets the comic train wreck in motion.

== Reception ==
The novel received mixed reviews from critics.

Publishers Weekly opined that "The risible title is arguably the best thing about Brown's latest comic novel", noting that fans of Brown might well enjoy Venus Envy, but that first-time readers are bound to be disappointed. The Kirkus review found an excess of platitudes in the text, but also that Brown's "sexual frankness and flippant humor are as refreshing as always." Chicago Tribune's Patrick T. Reardon found the novel "uneven", and "a real mess of a book, albeit a usually amiable and often amusing one," noting that Venus Envy is more a polemic than a novel: "a series of set pieces in which characters—read Brown—speechify about deep and important things." Yet for all his criticisms, he concludes that the book is enjoyable and fun.

Carla Tomaso, in the Los Angeles Times, calls Venus Envy an "often witty and tender novel", in which Brown does what she does best: "create irreverent individualists, usually lesbians, who thumb their noses, always attractive, at society and then have a great time watching everybody squirm. We readers enjoy it as well, especially when Brown doesn’t take herself too seriously in the attempt to be profound." The fault she finds is that Brown pulls "too many strings", and that some of the dialogue gets "didactic" and gives her "permission" to "relax and stop worrying that we won’t get the message. We will."
