= Mercy among the Children =

2000 novel by David Adams Richards

- Author: David Adams Richards
- Language: English
- Published: 2000 (Doubleday Canada)
- Publication place: Canada
- Media type: Print

Mercy among the Children is a novel by David Adams Richards, published by Doubleday Canada in 2000. Sarah Slean championed the novel to compete in Canada Reads in 2009.

== Synopsis ==
Set in the rural Miramichi Valley of New Brunswick, the novel depicts the family of Sydney Henderson, a man who vowed in childhood never to express himself in anger or violence after accidentally pushing a playmate off the roof of a building. As a result of his vow, residents of the community exploit Henderson, framing him for a crime and tormenting his children. The novel closely explores the effect of this dynamic on one particular son, Lyle, who is drawn into violence as he attempts to defend his family. The characters are limited by many constraints such as class, poverty, lack of education, family background and reputation and the biases that come along with these factors.

== Awards ==
The book was a co-winner of the Giller Prize in 2000, with Michael Ondaatje's novel Anil's Ghost. This was the only tie in the history of the award.
