= Venus Envy (sex shop) =

Canadian sex shop and bookstore

Venus Envy is a Canadian sex shop and independent book store with a website and two retail stores (in Ottawa, Ontario and Halifax, Nova Scotia). Venus Envy was the second Canadian business to offer woman-friendly surroundings and service distinct from traditional sex stores.

== Locations ==
The Halifax Venus Envy opened in the South end of the city in 1998 and moved to its current downtown location in 1999. The Halifax location is a full-service book store that serves as the local women's and LGBT book store as well as a sex shop.

The Ottawa store opened in the Byward Market area in 2001 and moved to its second Centretown location in 2005. VE is now located at 226 Bank Street. Venus Envy Ottawa is more narrowly a sex shop than the Halifax location, offering books only on matters of sex, gender, reproduction, and health. In 2015, the Ottawa store was fined by the city for selling a chest binder to a minor. In support of Venus Envy, city councillor Catherine McKenney and mayor Jim Watson called for reform to the bylaw. The fine was later waived. Venus Envy removed sexually explicit videos from their racks in order to make the store an all ages space. In March 2022, the Bank Street location closed indefinitely due to a fire.

== Education ==
Venus Envy offers sexual and health education workshops, and engages in sex education outreach in partnership with local groups such as the Canadian Federation for Sexual Health (formerly Planned Parenthood Canada) and various student and women's organizations. Both Venus Envy locations offer bursary programs in support of local students pursuing post-secondary education.

== See also ==
- Kaleigh Trace and Jaime Burnet, former employees at Venus Envy in Halifax
