= Jason Buxton =

Canadian film director and screenwriter

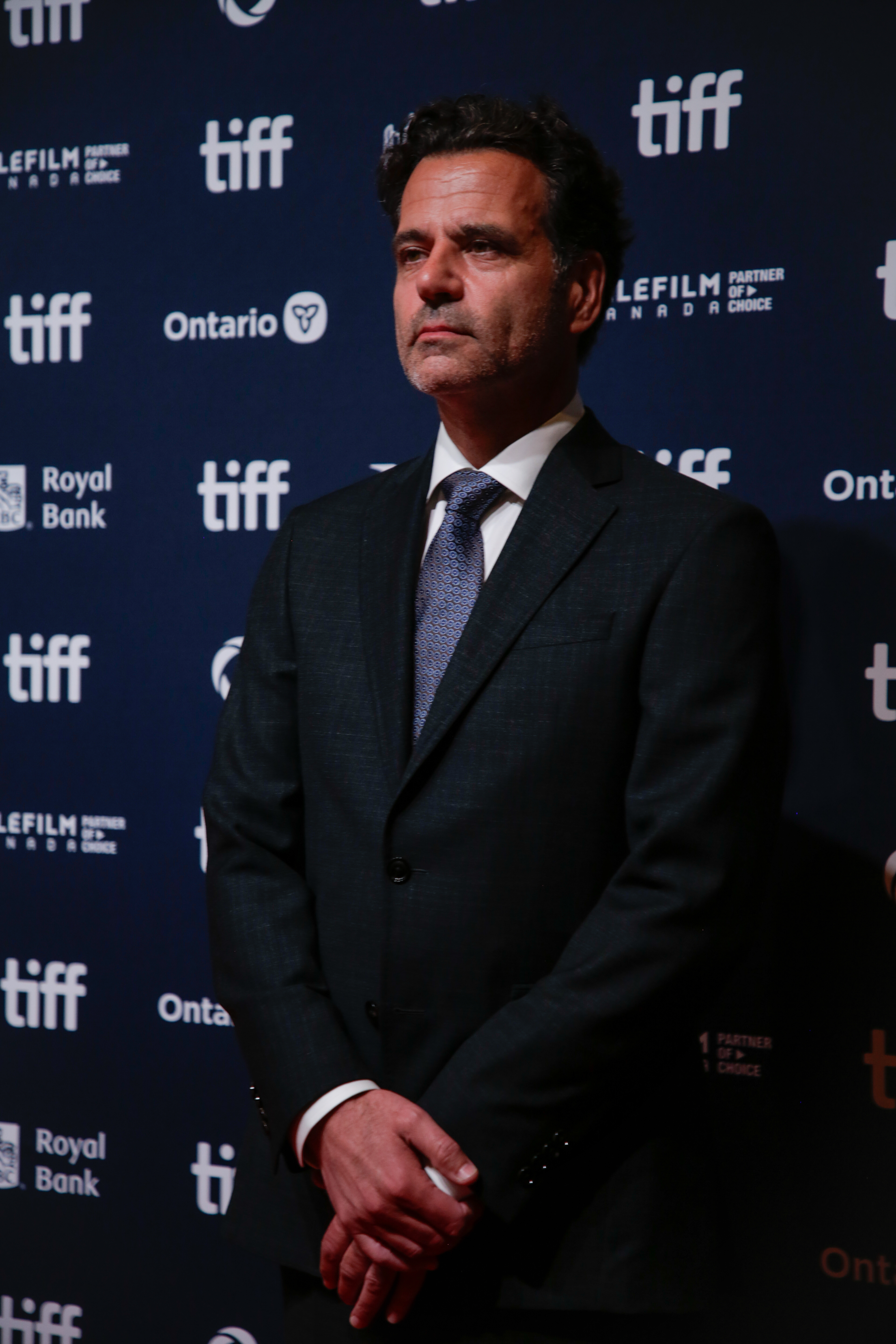
- Buxton at the 2024 Toronto International Film Festival
- Occupations: Film director, screenwriter
- Known for: Blackbird

Jason Buxton is a Canadian film director and screenwriter. He wrote and directed three short films, A Fresh Start, The Garden and The Drawing, before debuting his first full-length feature film, Blackbird, in 2012.

== Career ==
Buxton's first feature film Blackbird was nominated for two awards at the 1st Canadian Screen Awards, including a nomination for Best Original Screenplay. It was also a co-winner, alongside Brandon Cronenberg's Antiviral, of the Best Canadian First Feature Film award at the 2012 Toronto International Film Festival. The film won three awards at that year's Atlantic Film Festival: Best Atlantic Feature, Best Atlantic Director, and the Michael Weir Award for Outstanding Atlantic Screenplay (sponsored by the Michael Weir Foundation for the Arts).

Blackbird also won the 2013 Claude Jutra Award for the year's best Canadian film by a first-time director.

His second feature film, Sharp Corner, premiered at the 2024 Toronto International Film Festival.

== Personal life ==
Buxton is based in Halifax, Nova Scotia, Nova Scotia.
