= Ami McKay =

American-Canadian writer (born 1968)

- Born: 1968 (age 57–58); Lebanon, Indiana
- Education: Indiana State University
- Occupations: Novelist, playwright and journalist
- Children: 2
- Website: amimckay.com

Ami McKay (born 1968) is an American Canadian novelist, playwright and journalist.

== Personal life and education ==
McKay was born in Lebanon, Indiana in 1968 and was raised in rural Indiana. She received a bachelor's degree in music education and graduate degree in musicology from Indiana State University.

In 2000, McKay moved with her two sons to Scots Bay, Nova Scotia to live with the man she would eventually marry.

Many members of McKay's family have Lynch Syndrome, a genetic condition that causes a predisposition for numerous cancers. Later in life, McKay learned that she carries the gene. This condition has inspired her writing, most prominently Daughter of Family G.

== Career ==
After receiving her graduate degree, McKay moved to Chicago, where she taught music full-time and spent her free-time writing.

In 2000, she devoted herself to writing full-time. During this time, she "began writing and producing documentaries for CBC Radio." Her work has aired on Maritime Magazine, Outfront, This Morning and The Sunday Edition. Her documentary, Daughter of Family G won an Excellence in Journalism Medallion at the 2003 Atlantic Journalism Awards. She was a finalist in the Writers' Union of Canada's Short Prose Competition as well as the recipient of a grant from the Nova Scotia Department of Tourism, Culture and Heritage.

McKay's first novel, The Birth House, was published in 2006 and landed the top spot on Canadian bestseller lists. Her second novel, The Virgin Cure, was published in 2012.

Her first script for the stage, Jerome: The Historical Spectacle, was commissioned by Two Planks and a Passion Theatre Company and was staged at The Ross Creek Centre for the Arts, directed by Ken Schwartz in August 2008.

In 2019, it was announced that The Birth House had been purchased to be adapted for television by Sherry White and Kerri MacDonald and Omnifilm Entertainment Ltd.

== Awards and recognition ==
In 2003, McKay was an apprentice in the WFNS Mentorship program, where she was paired with Richard Cumyn.

In 2011, The Birth House was one of five finalists in CBC's Canada Reads, having been championed by TV host and designer Debbie Travis.

In 2012, McKay received the Established Artist Recognition Award from the Creative Nova Scotia Leadership Council / Province of Nova Scotia. The same year, The Virgin Cure won the Atlantic Independent Booksellers' Association "Bookseller's Choice of the Year" award.

In 2017, CBC Books included The Birth House on their "100 novels that make you proud to be Canadian" list in the 69th position.

Awards for McKay's writing
Year	Title	Award	Result	Ref.
2003	Daughter of Family G	Atlantic Journalism Award for Feature Writing for Radio	Finalist	
2003	Daughter of Family G	Gabriel Award	Winner	
2003	"Illumination"	Writers' Union of Canada Short Prose Competition	Winner	
2004	The Birth House	H.R.(Bill) Percy Prize for Unpublished Novel	Second	
2007	The Birth House	Atlantic Book Awards' Booksellers' Choice Award	Winner	
2007	The Birth House	Evergreen Award	Winner	
2007	The Birth House	International Dublin Literary Award	Longlist	
2007	The Birth House	Libris Award for Best Author	Winner	
2007	The Birth House	Libris Award for Best Fiction	Winner	
2009	Jerome	Robert Meritt Award for Outstanding Play by a Nova Scotian Playwright	Finalist	
2009	Jerome	Robert Meritt Award for Outstanding Sound or Original Score	Winner	
2017	The Witches of New York	Sunburst Award for Adult Fiction	Finalist	
2017	The Witches of New York	Thomas Raddall Atlantic Fiction Award	Winner	
2018	Nothing Less!	Robert Meritt Award for Outstanding Musical Direction	Finalist	
2018	Nothing Less!	Robert Meritt Award for Outstanding Original Score	Finalist	
2018	Nothing Less!	Robert Meritt Award for Outstanding Play by a Nova Scotian Playwright	Finalist	
2020	Daughter of Family G	Evelyn Richardson Non-Fiction Award	Winner	
2020	Daughter of Family G	Robbie Robertson Dartmouth Book Award	Winner	

== Writing credits ==
=== Books ===
==== Fiction ====
- The Birth House, Knopf Canada (2006)
- The Virgin Cure, Knopf Canada (2011)
- The Witches of New York, Knopf Canada (2016)
- Half Spent Was the Night, Knopf Canada (2018)

==== Nonfiction ====
- Before My Time: A Memoir of Love and Fate, Vintage Books Canada (2021)
- Daughter of Family G: A Memoir of Cancer Genes, Love and Fate, Knopf Canada (2019)
  - Prior to publication, segments of Daughter of Family G were featured on CBC Radio's The Sunday Edition
  - In 2003, a segment of Daughter of Family G was selected to air on Soundprint and aired on National Public Radio stations throughout the U.S.

=== Other ===
- Jerome: The Historical Spectacle, Gaspereau Press 2008
  - First staged by Two Planks and Passion Theatre Company August 1–17, 2008 at the Ross Creek Centre for the Arts
- "Christ on a Bike," published in Room of One's Own Magazine
- Kitchen Ghosts, Feature Documentary for CBC Radio's Outfront
- The Midwife House, Feature Webumentary for CBC Radio's Outfront
- From Smart Girl to Scat Girl, Feature Documentary for CBC Radio's Outfront
- Learning to Box, Personal Essay for CBC Radio's First Person Singular

== Affiliations ==
- The Writers Federation of Nova Scotia - Writer's Council Member
- PEN Canada & the PEN Canada Rapid Action Network
- Writing Fellow at the Ross Creek Centre for the Arts

== See also ==
- List of Canadian writers
