= Atlantic Book Awards & Festival =

Canadian literature event

The Atlantic Book Awards & Festival is an annual event celebrating Atlantic Canadian writing and book illustration. Free events take place across the four Atlantic provinces (Newfoundland and Labrador, Prince Edward Island, New Brunswick, and Nova Scotia). The flagship event is the awards ceremony itself at which 13 different literary awards are presented.

== Awards ==
- Thomas Head Raddall Award - fiction
- J. M. Abraham Poetry Award - poetry
- Ann Connor Brimer Award - children's literature
- Alistair MacLeod Prize - short fiction
- Atlantic Book Award for Scholarly Writing
- Atlantic Publishers Marketing Association’s Best Atlantic-Published Book Award
- Democracy 250 Atlantic Book Award for Historical Writing
- Evelyn Richardson Award for Non-Fiction
- Jim Connors Dartmouth Book Award - fiction
- Robbie Robertson Dartmouth Book Award - non-fiction
- Lillian Shepherd Award for Excellence in Illustration
- Margaret and John Savage First Book Award, Fiction
- Margaret and John Savage First Book Award, Non-Fiction

== See also ==
- Literature of Nova Scotia
