= Amazon Canada First Novel Award =

Canadian literary award

The Amazon Canada First Novel Award, formerly the Amazon.ca First Novel Award and the Books in Canada First Novel Award, is a Canadian literary award, co-presented by Amazon.ca and The Walrus to the best first novel in English published the previous year by a citizen or resident of Canada. It has been awarded since 1976.

The First Novel Award was founded by the literary magazine Books in Canada. Between 1976 and 1994, the award was sponsored by SmithBooks. During this period, the award was known as the SmithBooks/Books in Canada First Novel Award. When SmithBooks was acquired by Chapters, it became the Chapters/Books in Canada First Novel Award.

The award was reorganized when Books in Canada was acquired by Adrian and Olga Stein in 1995. The Steins retained a first novel editor, introduced a comprehensive first novel review program, and formalized the adjudication process.

Amazon first signed on as a sponsor of the award in 2001, with the award presented as the amazon.ca/Books in Canada First Novel Award through the 2000s. Full administration of the award was taken over by Amazon in 2009 and its name was changed to the Amazon.ca First Novel Award. The Amazon.com arrangement saw the prize award initially doubled to $10,000, and then increased to its current amount of $60,000, with shortlisted finalists each receiving $6,000.

== Winners and finalists ==
At different times in its history, the award has been presented early in the year for works published in the preceding year, late in the year for works published in the same year as the presentation, or mid-year for an eligibility period that straddled parts of both years. For clarity, the list below is organized by the year of presentation rather than the year of publication eligibility.

=== 1970s ===
Amazon.ca First Novel Award winners and finalists, 1977-1979
Year	Author	Title	Result	Ref.
1977	Ian McLachlan	The Seventh Hexagram	Winner	
1977	Michael Ondaatje	Coming Through Slaughter	Winner	
1977	Alice Boissonneau	Eileen McCullough	Finalist	
1977	David Kellum	The Falling World of Tristram Pocket	Finalist	
1977	Susan Kerslake	Middlewatch	Finalist	
1977	Sharon Riis	The True Story of Ida Johnson	Finalist	
1977	Carol Shields	Small Ceremonies	Finalist	
1977	Mary Soderstrom	The Descent of Andrew McPherson	Finalist	
1978	Oonah McFee	Sandbars	Winner	
1978	Shane Dennison	Sidehill Gouger	Finalist	
1978	Pauline Gedge	Child of the Morning	Finalist	
1978	Jack Hodgins	The Invention of the World	Finalist	
1978	M. T. Kelly	I Do Remember the Fall	Finalist	
1978	Helen Levi	A Small Informal Dance	Finalist	
1978	Morley Torgov	The Abramsky Variations	Finalist	
1979	Joan Barfoot	Abra	Winner	
1979	Michael Dorland	The Double-Cross Circuit	Finalist	
1979	Clive Doucet	Disneyland, Please	Finalist	
1979	Margaret Drury Gane	Parade on an Empty Street	Finalist	
1979	Kevin Major	Hold Fast	Finalist	
1979	Frank Paci	The Italians	Finalist	

=== 1980s ===
Amazon.ca First Novel Award winners and finalists, 1980-1989
Year	Author	Title	Result	Ref.
1980	Clark Blaise	Lunar Attractions	Winner	
1980	Victoria Branden	Mrs. Job	Finalist	
1980	Stan Dragland	Peckertracks	Finalist	
1980	Florence Evans	A Man Without Passion	Finalist	
1980	Shirley Faessler	Everything in the Window	Finalist	
1980	Katherine Govier	Random Descent	Finalist	
1980	Betty Lambert	Crossings	Finalist	
1981	W. D. Valgardson	Gentle Sinners	Winner	
1981	Martyn Burke	Laughing War	Finalist	
1981	Susan Musgrave	The Charcoal Burners	Finalist	
1981	Graham Petrie	Seahorse	Finalist	
1981	Leon Rooke	Fat Woman	Finalist	
1982	Joy Kogawa	Obasan	Winner	
1982	Jim Christy	Streethearts	Finalist	
1982	George Jonas	Final Decree	Finalist	
1982	Edward O. Phillips	Sunday's Child	Finalist	
1982	Gary Ross	Always Tip the Dealer	Finalist	
1983	W. P. Kinsella	Shoeless Joe	Winner	
1983	Lorris Elliott	Coming for to Carry	Finalist	
1983	Geraldine Rahmani	Blue	Finalist	
1983	Nessa Rapoport	Preparing for Sabbath	Finalist	
1983	Ann Rosenberg	The Bee Book	Finalist	
1984	Heather Robertson	Willie: A Romance	Winner	
1984	Robert G. Collins	Tolerable Levels of Violence	Finalist	
1984	Susan Swan	The Biggest Modern Woman in the World	Finalist	
1984	George Szanto	Not Working	Finalist	
1984	Wayne Tefs	Figures on a Wharf	Finalist	
1985	Geoffrey Ursell	Perdue, or How the West Was Lost	Winner	
1985	Sharon Butala	Country of the Heart	Finalist	
1985	Douglas Glover	Precious	Finalist	
1985	John Gray	Dazzled	Finalist	
1985	Sara Stambaugh	I Hear the Reaper's Song	Finalist	
1985	Armin Wiebe	The Salvation of Yasch Siemens	Finalist	
1986	Wayne Johnston	The Story of Bobby O'Malley	Winner	
1986	Susan Haley	A Nest of Singing Birds	Finalist	
1986	Ann Ireland	A Certain Mr. Takahashi	Finalist	
1986	Frank Jones	Master and Maid	Finalist	
1986	Robert Walshe	Wales' Work	Finalist	
1987	Karen Lawrence	The Life of Helen Alone	Winner	
1987	Marc Diamond	Momentum	Finalist	
1987	David Gilmour	Back on Tuesday	Finalist	
1987	Paulette Jiles	The Late Great Human Road Show	Finalist	
1987	Jo Anne Williams Bennett	Downfall People	Finalist	
1988	Marion Quednau	The Butterfly Chair	Winner	
1988	D.F. Bailey	Fire Eyes	Finalist	
1988	W.D. Barcus	Squatters' Island	Finalist	
1988	Pauline Holdstock	The Blackbird's Song	Finalist	
1988	Seán Virgo	Selakhi	Finalist	
1989	Rick Salutin	A Man of Little Faith	Winner	
1989	Neil Bissoondath	A Casual Brutality	Finalist	
1989	Joan Clark	The Victory of Geraldine Gull	Finalist	
1989	David Homel	Electrical Storms	Finalist	
1989	Janice Kulyk Keefer	Constellations	Finalist	
1989	Helen Fogwill Porter	January, February, June or July	Finalist	

=== 1990s ===
Amazon.ca First Novel Award winners and finalists, 1990-1999
Year	Author	Title	Result	Ref.
1990	Sandra Birdsell	The Missing Child	Winner	
1990	Marilyn Bowering	To All Appearances a Lady	Finalist	
1990	Barry Callaghan	The Way the Angel Spread Her Wings	Finalist	
1990	Jacqueline Dumas	Madeleine and the Angel	Finalist	
1990	Kristjana Gunnars	The Prowler	Finalist	
1990	Kenneth Radu	Distant Relations	Finalist	
1991	Nino Ricci	Lives of the Saints	Winner	
1991	Gail Bowen	Deadly Appearances	Finalist	
1991	Rita Donovan	The Dark Jewels	Finalist	
1991	Glen Huser	Grace Lake	Finalist	
1991	Margot Livesey	Homework	Finalist	
1991	Carsten Stroud	Sniper's Moon	Finalist	
1992	Rohinton Mistry	Such a Long Journey	Winner	
1992	Douglas Coupland	Generation X: Tales for an Accelerated Culture	Finalist	
1992	Ekbert Faas	Woyzeck's Head	Finalist	
1992	Michael Kenyon	Kleinberg	Finalist	
1992	Alberto Manguel	News From a Foreign Country Came	Finalist	
1993	John Steffler	The Afterlife of George Cartwright	Winner	
1993	Douglas Anthony Cooper	Amnesia	Finalist	
1993	Carole Corbeil	Voice-Over	Finalist	
1993	Kenneth J. Harvey	Brud	Finalist	
1993	Greg Hollingshead	Spin Dry	Finalist	
1994	Deborah Joy Corey	Losing Eddie	Winner	
1994	Catherine Bush	Minus Time	Finalist	
1994	Don Dickinson	The Crew	Finalist	
1994	Douglas How	Blow Up the Trumpet in the New Moon	Finalist	
1994	Carol Malyon	If I Knew I'd Tell You	Finalist	
1995	Shyam Selvadurai	Funny Boy	Winner	
1995	Charles Foran	Kitchen Music	Finalist	
1995	Diane Schoemperlen	In the Language of Love	Finalist	
1995	Russell Smith	How Insensitive	Finalist	
1995	Cordelia Strube	Alex & Zee	Finalist	
1996	Keath Fraser	Popular Anatomy	Winner	
1996	Diana Atkinson	Highways and Dancehalls	Finalist	
1996	Wayson Choy	The Jade Peony	Finalist	
1996	Larissa Lai	When Fox Is a Thousand	Finalist	
1996	Yan Li	Daughters of the Red Land	Finalist	
1997	Anne Michaels	Fugitive Pieces	Winner	
1997	Gail Anderson-Dargatz	The Cure for Death by Lightning	Finalist	
1997	Ann-Marie MacDonald	Fall on Your Knees	Finalist	
1997	Yann Martel	Self	Finalist	
1997	Shani Mootoo	Cereus Blooms at Night	Finalist	
1998	Margaret Gibson	Opium Dreams	Winner	
1998	Kim Echlin	Elephant Winter	Finalist	
1998	Allan Levine	The Blood Libel	Finalist	
1998	Rabindranath Maharaj	Homer in Flight	Finalist	
1998	Tim Wynveen	Angel Falls	Finalist	
1999	André Alexis	Childhood	Winner	
1999	Loranne Brown	The Handless Maiden	Finalist	
1999	Tomson Highway	Kiss of the Fur Queen	Finalist	
1999	Terry Jordan	Beneath That Starry Place	Finalist	
1999	Kerri Sakamoto	The Electrical Field	Finalist	

=== 2000s ===
Amazon.ca First Novel Award winners and finalists, 2000-2009
Year	Author	Title	Result	Ref.
2000	David Macfarlane	Summer Gone	Winner	
2000	Alan R. Wilson	Before the Flood	Winner	
2000	Alistair MacLeod	No Great Mischief	Finalist	
2000	Donna Morrissey	Kit's Law	Finalist	
2000	Jim Munroe	Flyboy Action Figure Comes with Gasmask	Finalist	
2000	Catherine Simmons-Niven	A Fine Daughter	Finalist	
2001	Eva Stachniak	Necessary Lies	Winner	
2001	Steven Galloway	Finnie Walsh	Finalist	
2001	Scott Gardiner	The Dominion of Wyley McFadden	Finalist	
2001	Susan Juby	Alice, I Think	Finalist	
2001	Lydia Kwa	This Place Called Absence	Finalist	
2002	Michael Redhill	Martin Sloane	Winner	
2002	Dennis Bock	The Ash Garden	Finalist	
2002	Michael Crummey	River Thieves	Finalist	
2002	Marina Endicott	Open Arms	Finalist	
2002	Linda Little	Strong Hollow	Finalist	
2002	Elizabeth Ruth	Ten Good Seconds of Silence	Finalist	
2003	Mary Lawson	Crow Lake	Winner	
2003	Christy Ann Conlin	Heave	Finalist	
2003	Aislinn Hunter	Stay	Finalist	
2003	Clint Hutzulak	The Beautiful Dead End	Finalist	
2003	Michael V. Smith	Cumberland	Finalist	
2003	Marnie Woodrow	Spelling Mississippi	Finalist	
2004	Michel Basilières	Black Bird	Winner	
2004	Clayton Bailey	The Expedition	Finalist	
2004	John Bemrose	The Island Walkers	Finalist	
2004	Lisa Grekul	Kalyna's Song	Finalist	
2004	Edeet Ravel	Ten Thousand Lovers	Finalist	
2004	Bettina von Kampen	Blue Becomes You	Finalist	
2005	Colin McAdam	Some Great Thing	Winner	
2005	David Elias	Sunday Afternoon	Finalist	
2005	Ibi Kaslik	Skinny	Finalist	
2005	Arthur Motyer	What's Remembered	Finalist	
2005	Catherine Safer	Bishop's Road	Finalist	
2006	Joseph Boyden	Three Day Road	Winner	
2006	Howard Akler	The City Man	Finalist	
2006	Brenda Brooks	Gotta Find Me an Angel	Finalist	
2006	Anne Giardini	The Sad Truth About Happiness	Finalist	
2006	Kathryn Kuitenbrouwer	The Nettle Spinner	Finalist	
2006	B. Glen Rotchin	The Rent Collector	Finalist	
2007	Madeleine Thien	Certainty	Winner	
2007	Peter Behrens	The Law of Dreams	Finalist	
2007	John Degen	The Uninvited Guest	Finalist	
2007	Annette Lapointe	Stolen	Finalist	
2007	Heather O'Neill	Lullabies for Little Criminals	Finalist	
2007	Adam Lewis Schroeder	Empress of Asia	Finalist	
2008	Gil Adamson	The Outlander	Winner	
2008	David Chariandy	Soucouyant	Finalist	
2008	Kyo Maclear	The Letter Opener	Finalist	
2008	C.S. Richardson	The End of the Alphabet	Finalist	
2008	Brian Tucker	Big White Knuckles	Finalist	
2008	Andrew Wedderburn	The Milk Chicken Bomb	Finalist	
2009	Joan Thomas	Reading by Lightning	Winner	
2009	Michael Blouin	Chase & Haven	Finalist	
2009	Claudia Dey	Stunt	Finalist	
2009	Patrick Lane	Red Dog, Red Dog	Finalist	
2009	Mary Swan	The Boys in the Trees	Finalist	

=== 2010s ===
Amazon.ca First Novel Award winners and finalists, 2010-2019
Year	Author	Title	Result	Ref.
2010	Jessica Grant	Come, Thou Tortoise	Winner	
2010	Diana Fitzgerald Bryden	No Place Strange	Finalist	
2010	Annabel Lyon	The Golden Mean	Finalist	
2010	Damian Tarnopolsky	Goya's Dog	Finalist	
2010	Dragan Todorović	Diary of Interrupted Days	Finalist	
2010	Ian Weir	Daniel O'Thunder	Finalist	
2011	Eleanor Catton	The Rehearsal	Winner	
2011	Shaughnessy Bishop-Stall	Ghosted	Finalist	
2011	Miguel Syjuco	Ilustrado	Finalist	
2011	Dianne Warren	Cool Water	Finalist	
2011	Kathleen Winter	Annabel	Finalist	
2012	David Bezmozgis	The Free World	Winner	
2012	Fraser Nixon	The Man Who Killed	Finalist	
2012	Sina Queyras	Autobiography of Childhood	Finalist	
2012	Olive Senior	Dancing Lessons	Finalist	
2012	Alexi Zentner	Touch	Finalist	
2013	Anakana Schofield	Malarky	Winner	
2013	Marjorie Celona	Y	Finalist	
2013	Scott Fotheringham	The Rest Is Silence	Finalist	
2013	Pasha Malla	People Park	Finalist	
2013	Kim Thúy	Ru	Finalist	
2014	Wayne Grady	Emancipation Day	Winner	
2014	Kenneth Bonert	The Lion Seeker	Finalist	
2014	Krista Bridge	The Eliot Girls	Finalist	
2014	Susan Downe	Juanita Wildrose: My True Life	Finalist	
2014	D. W. Wilson	Ballistics	Finalist	
2015	Alix Hawley	All True Not a Lie in It	Winner	
2015	Emma Hooper	Etta and Otto and Russell and James	Finalist	
2015	Sean Michaels	Us Conductors	Finalist	
2015	Guillaume Morissette	New Tab	Finalist	
2015	Chelsea Rooney	Pedal	Finalist	
2016	Mona Awad	13 Ways of Looking at a Fat Girl	Winner	
2016	Karim Alrawi	Book of Sands	Finalist	
2016	Aaron Cully Drake	Do You Think This Is Strange?	Finalist	
2016	W. Mark Giles	Seep	Finalist	
2016	Judith McCormack	Backspring	Finalist	
2016	Elizabeth Philips	The Afterlife of Birds	Finalist	
2017	Katherena Vermette	The Break	Winner	
2017	Catherine Cooper	White Elephant	Finalist	
2017	Kaie Kellough	Accordéon	Finalist	
2017	Rebecca Rosenblum	So Much Love	Finalist	
2017	Yasuko Thanh	Mysterious Fragrance of the Yellow Mountains	Finalist	
2018	Michael Kaan	The Water Beetles	Winner	
2018	Sharon Bala	The Boat People	Finalist	
2018	David Demchuk	The Bone Mother	Finalist	
2018	Omar El Akkad	American War	Finalist	
2018	Rachel Manley	The Black Peacock	Finalist	
2018	Alison Watt	Dazzle Patterns	Finalist	
2019	Casey Plett	Little Fish	Winner	
2019	Liz Harmer	The Amateurs	Finalist	
2019	Tyler Hellard	Searching for Terry Punchout	Finalist	
2019	Tanya Tagaq	Split Tooth	Finalist	
2019	Joshua Whitehead	Jonny Appleseed	Finalist	
2019	Ian Williams	Reproduction	Finalist	

=== 2020s ===
Amazon Canada First Novel Award winners and finalists, 2020–present
Year	Author	Title	Result	Ref.
2020	Stéphane Larue (tr. Pablo Strauss)	The Dishwasher	Winner	
2020	Nancy Jo Cullen	The Western Alienation Merit Badge	Finalist	
2020	James Gregor	Going Dutch	Finalist	
2020	Victoria Hetherington	Mooncalves	Finalist	
2020	Nazanine Hozar	Aria	Finalist	
2020	Andrew David MacDonald	When We Were Vikings	Finalist	
2021	Michelle Good	Five Little Indians	Winner	
2021	Sheung-King	You Are Eating an Orange. You Are Naked.	Finalist	
2021	Francesca Ekwuyasi	Butter Honey Pig Bread	Finalist	
2021	Marlowe Granados	Happy Hour	Finalist	
2021	Jael Richardson	Gutter Child	Finalist	
2021	John Elizabeth Stintzi	Vanishing Monuments	Finalist	
2022	Pik-Shuen Fung	Ghost Forest	Winner	
2022	Emily Austin	Everyone in This Room Will Someday Be Dead	Finalist	
2022	Lisa Bird-Wilson	Probably Ruby	Finalist	
2022	Brian Thomas Isaac	All the Quiet Places	Finalist	
2022	Conor Kerr	Avenue of Champions	Finalist	
2022	Aimee Wall	We, Jane	Finalist	
2023	Jasmine Sealy	The Island of Forgetting	Winner	
2023	Billy-Ray Belcourt	A Minor Chorus	Finalist	
2023	André Forget	In the City of Pigs	Finalist	
2023	Jessica Johns	Bad Cree	Finalist	
2023	William Ping	Hollow Bamboo	Finalist	
2023	Kai Thomas	In the Upper Country	Finalist	
2024	Alicia Elliott	And Then She Fell	Winner	
2024	Jordan Abel	Empty Spaces	Finalist	
2024	Caroline Dawson	As the Andes Disappeared	Finalist	
2024	Kōtuku Titihuia Nuttall	Tauhou	Finalist	
2024	Janika Oza	A History of Burning	Finalist	
2024	Amanda Peters	The Berry Pickers	Finalist	
2025	Valérie Bah	Subterrane	Winner	
2025	Andrew Boden	When We Were Ashes	Finalist	
2025	Benjamin Hertwig	Juiceboxers	Finalist	
2025	David Huebert	Oil People	Finalist	
2025	Myriam Lacroix	How It Works Out	Finalist	
2025	Natalie Sue	I Hope This Finds You Well	Finalist	
2026	Maria Reva	Endling	Winner	
2026	Kate Cayley	Property	Finalist	
2026	Jon Claytor	Nowhere	Finalist	
2026	Antonio Michael Downing	Black Cherokee	Finalist	
2026	Kyle Edwards	Small Ceremonies	Finalist	
2026	Ben Ladouceur	I Remember Lights	Finalist	
