= Latin American Canadians =

Canadians of Latin American descent

Canadiens d'Amérique latine (French) Canadenses da América Latina (Portuguese) Canadienses de América Latina (Spanish)
- Latin American Canadians as percent of population by census division (2021)

Total population
- Est. 1.2 million (all, 2023 Statistics Canada estimates); 3.3% of Canadian population

Regions with significant populations
- Central-west Greater Toronto Area, Hamilton-Burlington, St. Catharines, Simcoe County, Southwestern Ontario • Greater Montreal, Sherbrooke, Quebec City Area • increasing populations in Ottawa–Gatineau, Metro Vancouver, Vancouver Island, Greater Calgary and Edmonton

Languages
- Canadian English, Canadian French, Brazilian Portuguese, Spanish, Spanglish, Porglish, Frespañol

Religion
- Predominantly Christianity (Roman Catholicism; minority Protestantism)

Related ethnic groups
- Latin Americans, Hispanic and Latino Americans, Spanish Canadians, Portuguese Canadians, Native Americans

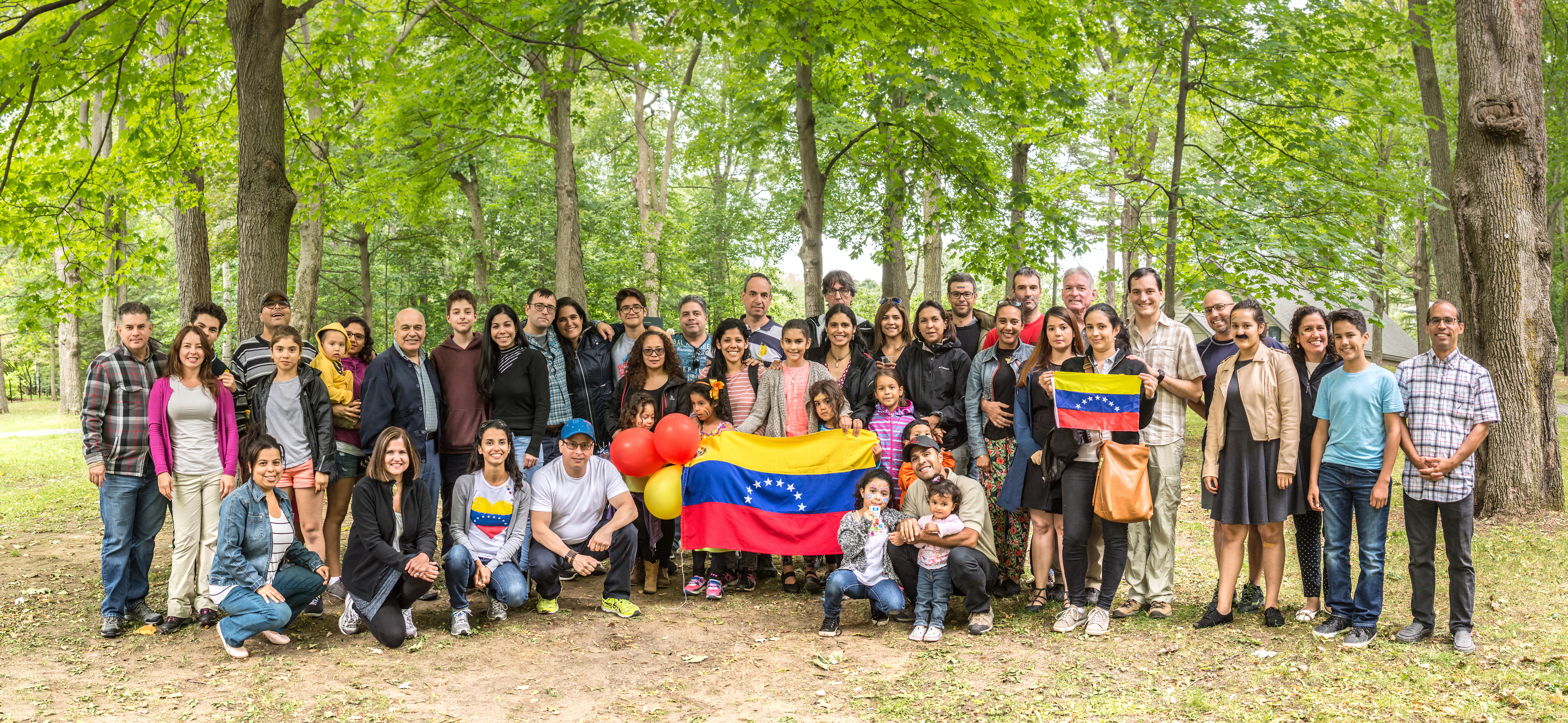
Venezuelan community in Bois de Boulogne, Quebec (taken in 2017)

Latin American Canadians (French: Canadiens d'Amérique latine; Portuguese: Canadenses de América Latina; Spanish: Canadienses de América Latina), are Canadians who are descendants of people from countries of Latin America. The majority of Latin American Canadians are multilingual, primarily speaking Spanish, Portuguese, French and English. Most are fluent in one or both of Canada's two official languages, English and French. Spanish and Portuguese are Romance languages and share similarities in morphology and syntax with French.

Latin American Canadians have made distinguished contributions to Canada in all major fields, including politics, the military, diplomacy, music, philosophy, sports, business and economy, and science and technology.

The largest Latin American groups represented in Canada are Mexican Canadians, Colombian Canadians and Salvadoran Canadians. The Latino population is mostly concentrated in the provinces of Ontario and Quebec. Ontario holds the largest Latin American population with Toronto having the largest concentration (including the suburbs of Mississauga and Brampton), as well as other cities such as London, Leamington, Ottawa and Kitchener-Waterloo. Quebec has the second-largest Latin American population with Montreal having the largest concentration.

Latin American Canadians make up one of the major groups designated as a visible minority according to Statistics Canada. However, the census acknowledges the fact that Latin Americans can be white, as is the case of many Latin Americans in Canada, since Latin Americans are not a homogenous race and can have their origins in European, African, Indigenous, Asian people, or any mix of those groups.

Over 1.1 million (3.3% of Canadians) are of Latin American or Hispanic descent, according to Statistics Canada. However, only 580 thousand Canadians self-identified as Latin Americans or of Hispanic descent according to the 2021 Canadian Census.

== History ==
The majority of Latin American Canadians are recent immigrants who arrived in the late 20th century from Mexico, Colombia, El Salvador, Puerto Rico, Peru with smaller communities from Chile, Venezuela, Brazil, Cuba, Guatemala, and elsewhere, with nearly all Latin American countries represented.

Reasons for immigrating include Canada's better economic opportunities and politics or civil war and political repression in their native countries, as in the case of Chileans escaping from Augusto Pinochet's rule, Salvadorans fleeing from the Salvadoran Civil War, Peruvians escaping from the Internal conflict in Peru, Dominicans opposed to the regimes of Rafael Trujillo and Joaquin Balaguer, Mexicans escaping from the Mexican drug war, and Colombians from the violence in their country.

== Demographics ==
As of the 2021 Canadian Census, the largest Latin American communities are in the census metropolitan areas of Toronto (396,459; 3.5%), Montreal (287,856; 3.2%), Vancouver (151,500; 2.0%), Calgary (134,395; 2.3%), Edmonton (121,960; 1.6%), Ottawa (90,620; 1.4%), and Hamilton (30,605; 1.9%). The fastest growing are in the provinces of Alberta, Manitoba, and Nova Scotia.

=== Latin American population of Canada by census year ===
Census	Latin American population	Change from previous census	Total Canadian population	Change from previous census	Latin American population (%)
1996	176,970	N/A	28,528,125	N/A	0.6%
2001	216,980	22.6%	29,639,030	3.9%	0.7%
2006	304,245	40.2%	31,241,030	5.4%	1%
2011	381,280	25.3%	32,852,325	5.2%	1.2%
2016	447,325	17.3%	34,460,065	4.9%	1.3%
2021	580,235	29.7%	36,991,981	7.3%	1.6%

=== Latin American Canadian population in Canada by province or territory according to the Census ===
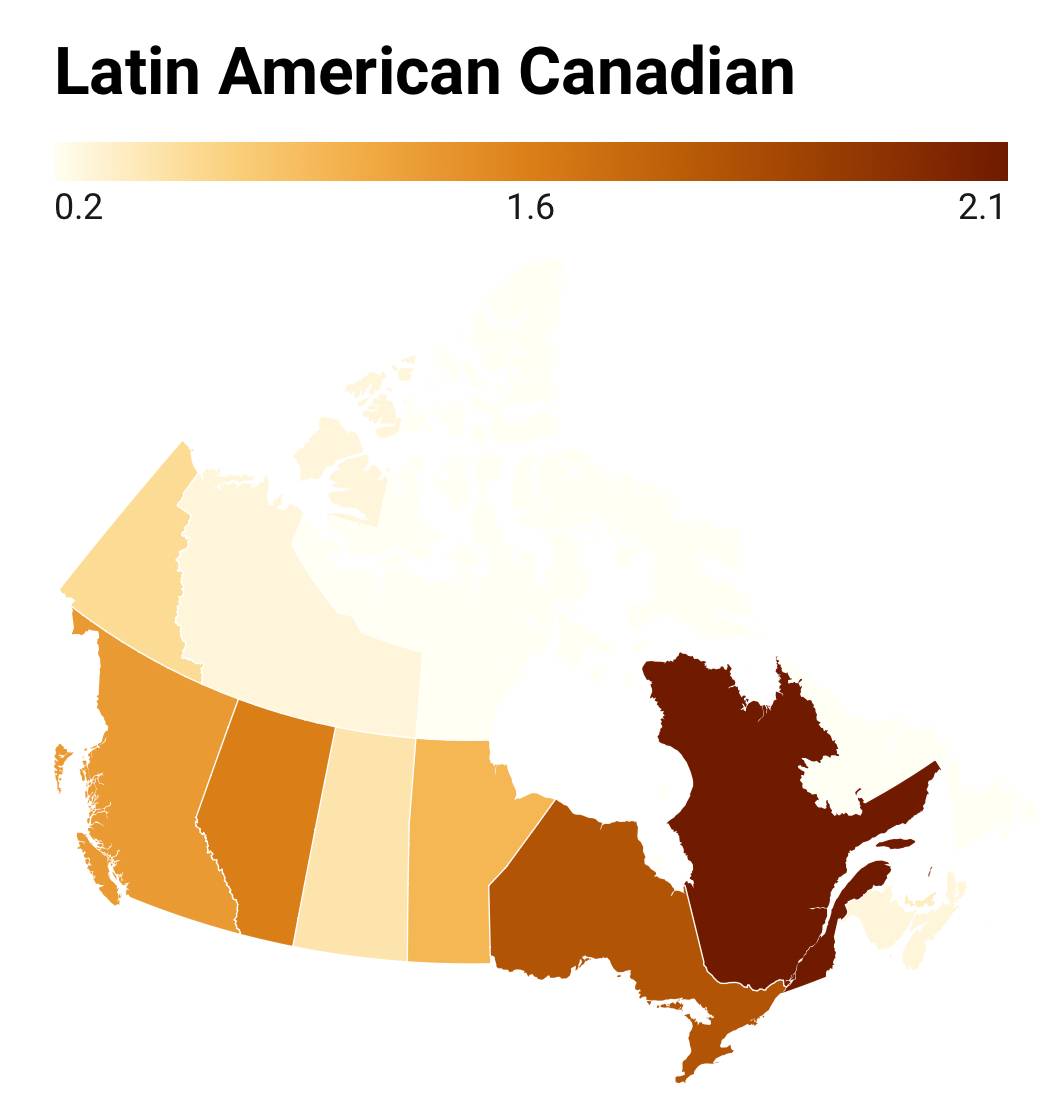
Latin American percent in Canadian provinces/territories, 2021 census

Province	2001		2011		2016		2021	
Province	Number	%	Number	%	Number	%	Number	%
Ontario	106,835	0.9%	172,560	1.4%	195,950	1.5%	249,190	1.8%
Québec	59,520	0.8%	116,380	1.5%	133,920	1.7%	172,925	2.0%
Alberta	18,745	0.6%	41,305	1.2%	55,090	1.4%	66,520	1.6%
British Columbia	23,885	0.6%	35,465	0.8%	44,115	1.0%	65,970	1.3%
Manitoba	4,775	0.4%	9,140	0.8%	9,895	0.8%	12,835	1.0%
Saskatchewan	2,010	0.2%	3,255	0.3%	4,195	0.4%	5,680	0.5%
Nova Scotia	520	0.0%	1,360	0.2%	1,685	0.2%	2,915	0.3%
New Brunswick	425	0.0%	1,160	0.2%	1,285	0.2%	2,450	0.3%
Prince Edward Island	75	0.1%	235	0.2%	255	0.2%	585	0.4%
Newfoundland and Labrador	80	0.0%	185	0.0%	635	0.1%	755	0.2%
Yukon	45	0.1%	105	0.3%	130	0.4%	235	0.6%
Northwest Territories	60	0.2%	105	0.3%	135	0.3%	125	0.3%
Nunavut	10	0.0%	30	0.1%	40	0.1%	60	0.2%
Canada	216,980	0.8%	381,280	1.2%	447,325	1.3%	580,235	1.6%

=== Immigration ===
Top 10 countries of origin for Latin American Canadians (2021)
Region	Number of immigrants	Region's share of total Latin American immigrants to Canada
Colombia	71,205	19.1%
Mexico	57,820	15.5%
El Salvador	47,450	12.8%
Peru	26,295	7.1%
Chile	22,015	5.9%
Brazil	20,400	5.5%
Venezuela	18,855	5.1%
Guatemala	16,865	4.5%
Ecuador	14,615	3.9%
Cuba	10,855	2.9%
Others	122,785	28.7%
Total Latin American immigrant population	428,180	100%

=== List of Canadian census subdivisions with Latin American populations higher than the national average ===
Source: Canada 2021 Census
National average: 1.6%

==== Alberta ====
- Brooks (4.3%)
- Calgary (2.1%)
- Edmonton (1.9%)
- Red Deer (1.8%)
- Lethbridge (1.7%)

==== British Columbia ====
As of 2021 Census reports; the Latin American community increased in the late 2010s and early 2020s in BC, especially in New Westminster and Vancouver proper:

- New Westminster (3.7%)
- Vancouver (2.9%)
- Burnaby (2.7%)
- Coquitlam (2.4%)
- Greater Vancouver A (2.1%)
- Port Moody (1.7%)

==== Manitoba ====
- Brandon (5%)

==== Ontario ====
- Leamington (7.1%)
- Abitibi (6.4%)
- Bradford West Gwillimbury (3.8%)
- Toronto (3.3%)
- Kitchener (3%)
- London (3%)
- Grand Valley (2.7%)
- Pic River (2.7%)
- Vaughan (2.6%)
- Milton (2.6%)
- Innisfil (2.6%)
- Mississauga (2.4%)
- Newbury (2.3%)
- St. Catharines (2.2%)
- New Tecumseth (2.2%)
- Brampton (2.1%)
- Hamilton (2%)
- Oakville (2%)
- Barrie (2%)
- Waterloo (1.9%)
- Burlington (1.7%)
- Cambridge (1.7%)
- Caledon (1.7%)

==== Quebec ====
- Sainte-Justine (6%)
- Brossard (5%)
- Courcelles-Saint-Évariste (4.9%)
- Longueuil (4.5%)
- Montréal (4.4%)
- Saint-Jean-de-l'Île-d'Orléans (4.4%)
- La Guadeloupe (3.6%)
- Saint-Didace (3.6%)
- Saint-René (3.7%)
- Dorval (3.5%)
- Lyster (3.5%)
- Laval (3.4%)
- Candiac (3.3%)
- Saint-Constant (3.3%)
- Plessisville (3.1%)
- Châteauguay (3.1%)
- Grand-Saint-Esprit (3.1%)
- Saint-Hyacinthe (2.9%)
- Saint-Lambert (2.9%)
- Montréal-Est (2.8%)
- Delson (2.8%)
- Vaudreuil-Dorion (2.6%)
- Sainte-Catherine (2.6%)
- Saint-Gédéon-de-Beauce (2.6%)
- Saint-Jacques-le-Mineur (2.5%)
- Très-Saint-Sacrement (2.5%)
- L'Île-Perrot (2.4%)
- Saint-Édouard-de-Lotbinière (2.4%)
- Hampstead (2.4%)
- Deux-Montagnes (2.3%)
- Boucherville (2.3%)
- La Prairie (2.3%)
- Bois-des-Filion (2.3%)
- Repentigny (2.2%)
- Terrebonne (2.1%)
- Pointe-Claire (2.1%)
- Saint-Amable (2.1%)
- Charlemagne (2.1%)
- Saint-Antoine-de-Tilly (2.1%)
- Sherbrooke (2%)
- Saint-Rémi (2%)
- Gatineau (1.9%)
- Saint-Alexis-de-Matapédia (1.9%)
- Boisbriand (1.9%)
- Rosemère (1.9%)
- Saint-Denis-sur-Richelieu (1.9%)
- Marieville (1.8%)
- Sainte-Anne-de-Bellevue (1.8%)
- Sainte-Marthe-sur-le-Lac (1.8%)
- Beaconsfield (1.8%)
- Saint-Basile-le-Grand (1.8%)
- Noyan (1.8%)
- Ham-Nord (1.8%)
- Louiseville (1.7%)
- Blainville (1.7%)
- Dollard-des-Ormeaux (1.7%)
- Joliette (1.7%)
- Mont-Royal (1.7%)
- Lorraine (1.7%)
- Les Cèdres (1.7%)
- Montréal-Ouest (1.7%)
- Léry (1.7%)
- Saint-Polycarpe (1.7%)
- Mascouche (1.6%)
- Saint-Bruno-de-Montarville (1.6%)
- Saint-Philippe (1.6%)
- Saint-Isidore (1.6%)

== List of notable Latin American Canadians ==
=== Music ===
- Eva Avila, pop singer and 2006 Canadian Idol winner
- Boogat, rapper
- Fito Blanko, tropical/urban singer-songwriter, born in Panama
- Camila, member of American girl group, Girlset
- Patricia Cano, singer
- Marco Castillo, singer-songwriter
- Ramon Chicharron, singer-songwriter
- José Miguel Contreras, rock musician and lead vocalist of By Divine Right
- Criollo, hip-hop group
- Beto Cuevas, rock musician and former lead vocalist of La Ley
- Eliana Cuevas, singer-songwriter
- Lhasa de Sela, folk musician
- Carlos del Junco, harmonica player, member of the Cuban del Junco family
- Quique Escamilla, Mexican-born musician
- Carole Facal, rock musician
- Alberto Guerrero, music composer and pianist, born in Chile
- DJ Kemo, producer and DJ for hip-hop group Rascalz
- Tom Landa, Mexican-born folk-rock musician
- Oscar Lopez, flamenco musician, born in Chile
- Lindi Ortega, singer-songwriter
- John Paul Ospina, singer
- Lido Pimienta, singer-songwriter
- Adonis Puentes, singer-songwriter
- Alexis Puentes, musician known by the stage name Alex Cuba
- Quilla, singer-songwriter
- Jessie Reyez, singer-songwriter
- Alejandra Ribera, singer-songwriter
- Smiley, rapper
- Isabella Lovestory, singer-songwriter

=== Writers ===
- Rodrigo Bascuñán, author and journalist, born in Chile
- Caroline Dawson, born in Chile
- Nicholas Dawson, born in Chile
- Gloria Escomel, writer and journalist born in Uruguay
- Gabriela Etcheverry, poet and novelist, born in Chile
- José Latour, novelist, born in Cuba.
- José Luis Rodríguez Pittí, writer and photographer born in Panama.
- Silvia Moreno-Garcia, novelist, born in Mexico.

=== Diplomacy / International Relations ===
- Pierre Alarie, of Mexican Descent; former Canadian Ambassador to Mexico; former Vice president, business development and sales at the Canadian Commercial Corporation

=== Entertainment ===
- Amanda Arcuri, actress of Argentine descent
- David Alvarez, actor of Cuban descent
- Daniela Bobadilla, actress born in Mexico
- Ariane Castellanos, actress of Guatemalan descent
- Joana Ceddia, YouTube Personality, born in Brazil
- Martha Chaves, stand-up comedian, born in Nicaragua
- Juan Chioran, stage actor, born in Argentina
- Nick Cordero, stage actor, Costa Rican descent
- Nelson Coronado, actor, born in Guatemala
- Laysla De Oliveira, actress of Brazilian descent
- Humberly González, actress, born in Venezuela
- Ona Grauer, television and film actress, born in Mexico
- Blair Lamora, actress of Argentine descent
- Marito Lopez, actor and stand-up comedian, born in El Salvador
- Luisana Lopilato, actress, born in Argentina (dual citizen)
- Lisette Morelos, telenovela actress, born in Mexico
- Michael Mando, film and television actor (of Mexican descent).
- Flora Martínez, actress, part-Colombian descent
- Emilia McCarthy, actress (of Mexican descent).
- Mariló Núñez, theatre director, dramaturge, playwright, scholar (born in Chile)
- Emma Rabbe, television and film actress of Venezuelan descent
- Klea Scott, television and film actress, born in Panama
- Tasya Teles, actress of Brazilian descent

=== Photography ===
- Bruce Chun, cinematographer, born in Mexico
- German Gutierrez, cinematographer and documentary filmmaker
- Federico Hidalgo, filmmaker and film professor.
- Pedro Ruiz, documentary filmmaker
- Gabriela Osio Vanden, documentary filmmaker and cinematographer
- Adrian Villagomez, music video director

=== Politics ===
- Paulina Ayala, former MP for Honoré-Mercier (New Democratic Party), born in Chile
- Estefania Cortes-Vargas, Canadian politician, elected in the Alberta general election, 2015 to the Legislative Assembly of Alberta, representing the electoral district of Strathcona-Sherwood Park, born in Colombia
- Joseph Facal, former minister in Quebec (Parti Québécois), born in Uruguay
- Miguel Figueroa, leader and President of the Communist Party of Canada
- Andrés Fontecilla, leader of Québec solidaire, born in Chile
- Rosa Galvez, Senator, born in Peru
- Rod Loyola, Canadian politician, elected in the Alberta general election, 2015 to the Legislative Assembly of Alberta, representing the electoral district of Edmonton-Ellerslie, born in Chile
- Soraya Martinez Ferrada, mayor of Montreal, born in Chile
- Sergio Marchi, former MP (Liberal Party of Canada), born in Argentina
- Ricardo Miranda, Canadian politician, elected in the Alberta general election, 2015 to the Legislative Assembly of Alberta, representing the electoral district of Calgary-Cross, born in Nicaragua
- Osvaldo Nunez, former MP (Bloc Québécois), born in Chile
- Cesar Palacio, first Latino person elected to the Toronto City Council, born in Ecuador
- Saul Polo, MNA in Quebec, born in Colombia
- Pablo Rodríguez, MP for Honoré-Mercier (Liberal Party of Canada), born in Argentina.

=== Science and technology ===
- Ivar Mendez, MD surgeon, Professor and Chairman of Surgery at the University of Saskatchewan, born in Bolivia
- Manuel Buchwald, geneticist and academic, born in Peru
- Rafael Lozano-Hemmer, electronic artist, born in Mexico.

=== Sport ===
- Eleider Álvarez professional boxer, born in Colombia
- Michel Acosta, professional soccer player, born in Uruguay
- Oscar Albuquerque, former professional soccer player, born in Peru
- Keven Aleman, professional soccer player, born in Costa Rica
- Manny Aparicio, professional soccer player, born in Argentina
- Marco Bustos, professional soccer player
- Sergio Camargo, professional soccer player, born in Colombia
- Miguel Cañizalez, professional soccer player, born in El Salvador
- Lucas Cavallini, professional soccer player
- Carly Colón, professional wrestler, born in Puerto Rico via Canadian mother
- Oscar Cordon, professional soccer player
- Eurico Rosa Da Silva, professional jockey from Brazil
- Marco Dominguez, professional soccer player
- Chris Duarte, professional basketball player
- Leylah Fernandez, professional tennis player
- Marcelo Flores, professional soccer player
- Andres Fresenga, professional soccer player
- Kianz Froese, professional soccer player, born in Cuba
- Manny Gomez, professional soccer player, born in Argentina
- Vladimir Guerrero Jr., professional baseball player
- Cristián Gutiérrez, professional soccer player
- Melissa Humana-Paredes, professional beach volleyball player
- Otto Lopez, professional baseball player, born in the Dominican Republic
- Juan Cruz Mascia, professional soccer player
- Rosa Mendes, WWE Diva and professional wrestler
- Juan Mendez, professional basketball player
- Tony Menezes, Brazilian soccer player
- Ivan Menjivar, mixed martial artist
- Arturo Miranda, professional diver, born in Cuba
- David Monsalve, professional soccer player
- Mauricio Navarro, FIFA soccer referee, born in Chile
- Cristian Nuñez, professional soccer player
- Brady Oliveira, professional football player, CFL
- Jonathan Osorio, professional soccer player
- Damiano Palmegiani, professional baseball player
- Carlos Patino, professional soccer player, born in Colombia
- Yoana Peralta, professional soccer player
- Daniel Pinero, professional baseball player
- Willi Plett, professional hockey player, NHL
- Robyn Regehr, professional hockey player, NHL
- Óscar Rivas professional boxer, born in Colombia
- Bryce Salvador, professional hockey player, NHL
- Davis Sanchez, professional football player, CFL and NFL
- Isidro Sánchez Macip, professional soccer player, born in Mexico
- O. J. Santiago, professional football player, NFL and CFL
- Eduardo Sebrango, former professional soccer player, born in Cuba
- Oscar Taveras, late professional baseball player in MLB, born in the Dominican Republic
- Abraham Toro, professional baseball player
- Raffi Torres, professional hockey player, NHL
- Samuel Vargas, professional boxer, born in Colombia
- Héctor Vergara, FIFA soccer referee, born in Chile

=== Visual Art ===
- Gustavo Chams, visual artist

== See also ==
- Latino
- Latin American diaspora
- Hispanic Americans
- Portuguese Canadians
- Spanish Canadians
