= Li Yan =

Li Yan or Yan Li may refer to:

- Li Yan (Three Kingdoms) (李嚴; died 234), Shu military officer during the Three Kingdoms period
- Emperor Wuzong of Tang (814–846), personal name Li Yan (李炎), emperor of the Tang dynasty of China
- Emperor Xizong of Tang (862–888), birth name Li Yan (李儼), emperor of the Tang dynasty of China
- Li Yan (Yang Wu) (李儼; died 918), politician during Tang Dynasty and Wu
- Li Yan (artist) (李演; born 1977), Chinese artist
- Athena Lee Yen (李燕; born 1981), Taiwanese actress
- Yan Li (artist) (严力; 1954–2026), Chinese painter, poet, and editor
- Yan Li (author) (李彥; born 1955), Chinese-Canadian novelist
- Yan Li (politician) (born 1961), Chinese politician and engineer

== Sportspeople ==
- Li Yan (speed skater) (born 1968), Chinese short track speed skater and coach
- Li Yan (volleyball) (born 1976), Chinese volleyball player
- Li Yan (cyclist) (born 1980), Chinese cyclist
- Li Yan (footballer, born 1980), Chinese footballer for Shaanxi Baorong
- Li Yan (footballer, born 1984), Chinese footballer for Guangzhou Pharmaceutical
- Li Yan (snooker player) (born 1992), Chinese snooker player
- Li Yan (weightlifter), Chinese weightlifter
