= Emily Austin (disambiguation) =

Emily Austin (born 2001) is an American journalist and influencer.

Emily Austin may also refer to:

- Emily Austin Perry (1795–1851), landowner in Texas, the sole heir to Stephen F. Austin
- Emily Austin (writer), Canadian novelist and poet
