= Delirium (Cooper novel) =

1998 novel by Douglas Cooper

- Author: Douglas Cooper
- Cover artist: Joyce Tenneson
- Genre: Philosophical novel
- Publisher: Hyperion
- Publication date: February 1998
- Publication place: Canada
- Media type: Print
- Pages: 232
- ISBN: 0-7868-6341-2
- OCLC: 31045866
- Dewey Decimal: 813/.54 dc21
- LC Class: PR9199.3.C6435D45
- Preceded by: Amnesia

Delirium is a 1998 novel by Douglas Anthony Cooper and is the second entry in his Izzy Darlow series. The book was released by Hyperion in February 1998, and the Encyclopedia of Literature in Canada noted that it was "the first novel by an established author that was serialized on the Internet (Cooper began serializing the novel in 1994, shortly after the Web became widely available.)"

== Synopsis ==
Delirium has Izzy Darlow in New York, investigating the architect Ariel Price in order to write a biography about the man. Price proves to be an unwilling subject, threatening to murder his biographer.

== Reception ==
The New York Times wrote: "Although you can argue about whether the book represents high or low art, it's clearly art. Calling it pulp of a very high order allows you to pick your qualification: yes, but it's still pulp; or, yes, but it's still of a very high order." Quill and Quire expressed disappointment over Delirium, calling it "overwrought". Kirkus Reviews considered the book "baffling" as well as "fascinating." They described Cooper as "a comic-surrealist crossbreed of the late Lawrence Durrell and William S. Burroughs".
