= James Gregor =

James Gregor may refer to:

- A. James Gregor (1929–2019), American historian
- James Gregor Mackenzie (1927–1992), British Labour Party politician
- James Wyllie Gregor (1900–1980), Scottish botanist
- James Gregor (writer), Canadian writer

== See also ==
- James Grigor (1811–1848), botanist
