= Fawn Parker =

Canadian writer

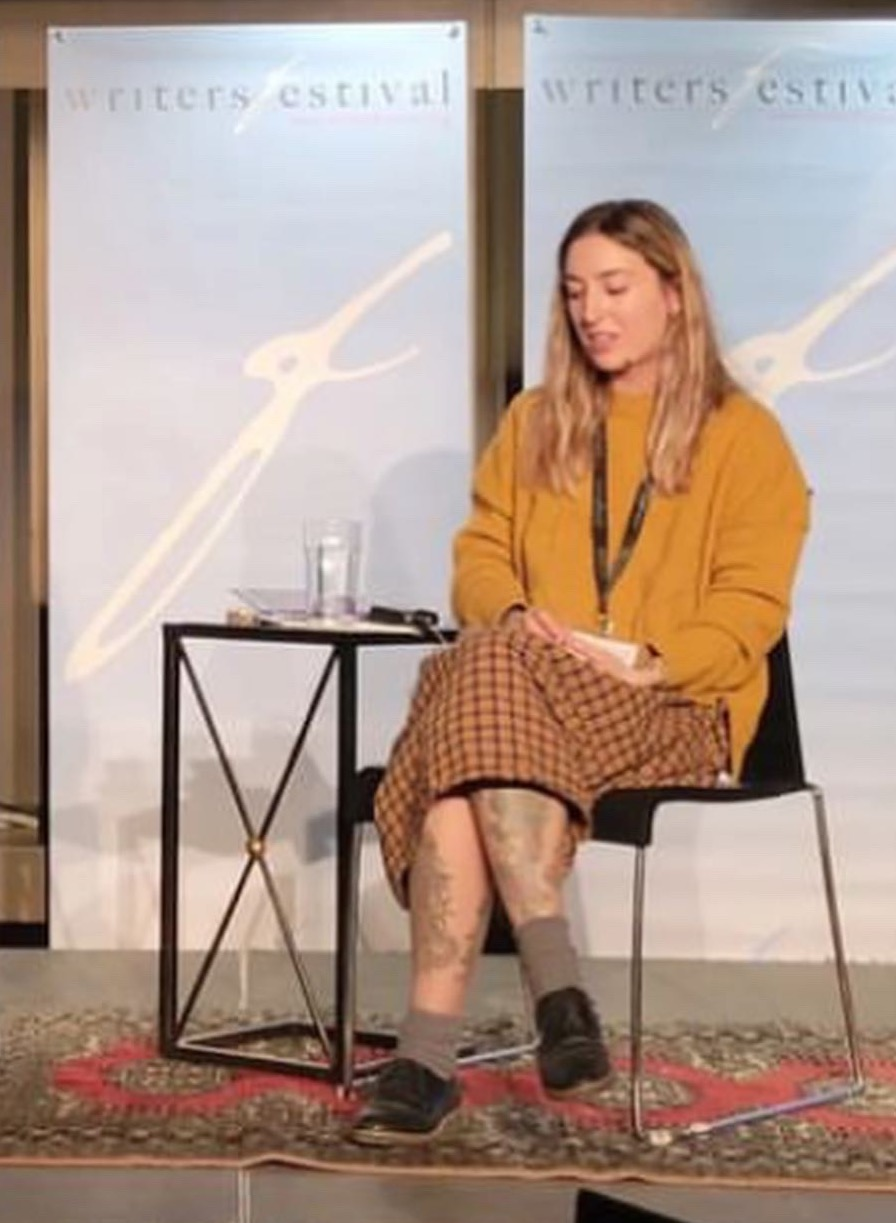
- Parker at the Ottawa International Writers Festival in 2022
- Education: University of Toronto (MA)
- Occupations: Novelist, poet, short story writer, essayist
- Writing career
- Notable works: What We Both Know, Soft Inheritance, Hi, It's Me
- Notable awards: Fiddlehead Poetry Prize (2024); JM Abraham Poetry Prize (2024)

Fawn Parker is a Canadian writer from New Brunswick.

== Career ==
Parker's novel What We Both Know was longlisted for the 2022 Giller Prize. Her essay "The Prescription" appeared in Maisonneuve Magazine and was a finalist for the 2023 National Magazine Awards. In 2020, her short story "FEED MACHINE" was nominated for the Writers' Trust of Canada/McClelland & Stewart Journey Prize. Her poem "Woof" was shortlisted for a 2024 National Magazine Award.

Parker holds an MA in creative writing from the University of Toronto and is studying at the University of New Brunswick to obtain her Ph.D. Her published works include the short story collection Looking Good and Having a Good Time (2015), the poetry collection Weak Spot (2018), the novels Set-Point (ARP 2019) and Dumb-Show (ARP 2021), her novel What We Both Know (McClelland & Stewart, 2022), and the poetry collection Soft Inheritance (Palimpsest 2023) which won both a 2024 New Brunswick Book Award and a 2024 Atlantic Book Award.

Her latest novel Hi, it's me was released by McClelland & Stewart in September 2024 and was a finalist for the 2024 Atwood Gibson Writer's Trust Fiction Prize. It is currently a finalist for the Governor General's Literary Award.

Parker is the 2024-2026 Poet Laureate of the City of Fredericton, New Brunswick.

== Awards and honours ==
=== Wins ===
- 2024 – Fiddlehead Poetry Prize, New Brunswick Book Awards, for Soft Inheritance.
- 2024 – JM Abraham Poetry Prize, Atlantic Book Awards, for Soft Inheritance.

=== Shortlists and finalists ===
- 2023 – National Magazine Award for "The Prescription".
- 2024 – National Magazine Award for "Woof".
- 2024 – Atwood Gibson Writers' Trust Fiction Prize for Hi, It's Me.
- 2025 – Governor General's Literary Award for Hi, It's Me.

=== Longlists ===
- 2020 – Journey Prize for "Feed Machine".
- 2022 – Giller Prize for What We Both Know.

=== Honours ===
- 2024–2026 – Poet laureate of Fredericton, New Brunswick.

== Bibliography ==
=== Novels ===
- Set-Point. ARP Books, 2019. ISBN 978-1-9278-8625-0.
- Dumb-Show. ARP Books, 2021. ISBN 978-1-9278-8656-4.
- What We Both Know. McClelland & Stewart, 2022. ISBN 978-0-7710-9673-0.
- Hi, It's Me. McClelland & Stewart, 2024. ISBN 978-0-7710-0515-2.
- Shut-in Magic. McClelland & Stewart. 2027.

=== Story Collections ===
- Looking Good and Having a Good Time. Metatron Press, 2015. ISBN 978-0-9939-4645-5.

=== Essays ===
- "The Prescription." Maisonneuve Magazine, 2022.

=== Poetry Collections ===
- Soft Inheritance. Palimpsest Press, 2023. ISBN 978-1-9902-9352-8.
- On Vacation. Palimpsest Press, 2027. ISBN 978-1-997508-25-0.
