= Alicia Elliott =

Tuscarora and Mohawk writer and editor (born 1987)

- Born: 1987 (age 38–39)
- Occupation: Writer
- Writing career
- Language: English

Alicia Elliott (born 1987 or 1988) is a Tuscarora and Mohawk writer and editor.

== Early life and education ==
Elliott was born in the United States and moved with her family to the Six Nations of the Grand River reserve in Ontario when she was 13. Although located in southern Ontario close to major cities, her home, like many others on the reserve, didn't have running water. She attended high school in the nearby city of Brantford, graduating in 2005.

== Career ==
Elliott's first paid writing opportunity occurred in 2015 when she wrote an article about band elections for Briarpatch magazine titled "The Meaning of Elections for Six Nations". In 2016, Leanne Betasamosake Simpson asked Elliott to contribute to the issue of The Malahat Review she was editing. Elliott's essay, "A Mind Spread Out On The Ground", went on to win a National Magazine Award, a prize that Elliot credits with kickstarting her career.

The next year, Elliott was selected by Tanya Talaga to receive the RBC Taylor Emerging Writer Award, which includes a cash prize and a mentorship component. A collection of Elliott's essays, also titled A Mind Spread Out on the Ground, was published by Penguin Random House in 2019.

From 2017–2018 she was the Geoffrey and Margaret Andrew Fellow at the University of British Columbia. She was selected as the first mentor-in-residence for Canadian feminist literary journal Room and served as the creative nonfiction editor at The Fiddlehead from 2018 through 2020.

In addition to her essays, Elliott has written for newspapers and magazines including The Globe and Mail, Maclean's, Maisonneuve, Today's Parent, and Reader's Digest.

In 2023 she published her debut novel, And Then She Fell. The book was the winner of the 2024 Amazon.ca First Novel Award.

== Awards and honours ==
- Gold prize at the National Magazine Awards for "A Mind Spread Out on the Ground" (2017).
- RBC Taylor Emerging Writer Award (2018).
- "Unearth" was selected to appear in The Best American Short Stories 2018.
- "Tracks" was selected to appear in the Best Canadian Stories 2018.
- Longlist, Journey Prize for "Tracks", 2018.
- Amazon.ca First Novel Award (2024) for And Then She Fell

== Selected works ==
=== Novel ===
- And Then She Fell (2023)

=== Collections ===
- A Mind Spread Out on the Ground (2018)

=== Short stories ===
- "Tracks," The New Quarterly, Winter 2017.
- "Unearth," Grain issue 44.3, Spring 2017.

=== Essays ===
- "A Mind Spread Out on the Ground," The Malahat Review, Winter 2016.
- "The Meaning of Elections for Six Nations," Briarpatch, 2016.
- "On Seeing and Being Seen: The Difference Between Writing With Empathy and Writing with Love," Room, 2018.
