= Antorcha (award) =

Award at a festival in Viña del Mar, Chile

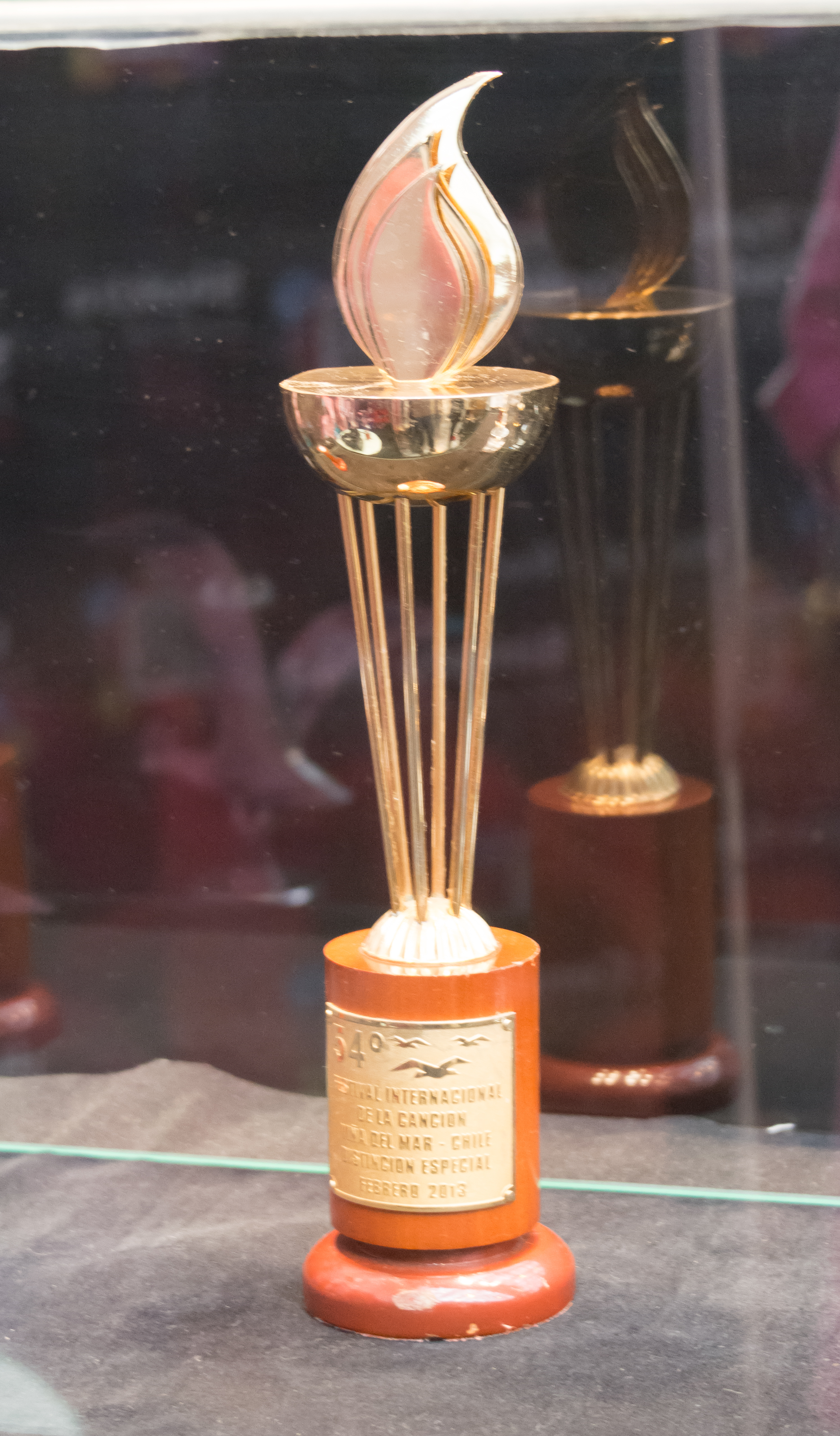
The Antorcha de Oro

The Antorcha (transl. Torch) was an award given to the artists who participate in the Viña del Mar International Song Festival according to audience reaction. It was created in 1983 in honor of the paper torches that people lit in the stands of Quinta Vergara.

In January 2015, this award was eliminated in favor of the Gaviota. The reason is due to the devaluation that the award had suffered in previous years, including the "excessive" intervention of the presenters, who had to interrupt the presentation on four occasions.

== Trophy ==
The trophy has the shape of a torch, supported by three cylindrical bars that suspend it. It is inserted in a wooden base. Originally, one torch was plated in silver, but later, and to regulate the delivery of the Gaviotas de Oro, another torch was created, plated in gold. This shaped their names: The Antorcha de Plata and the Antorcha de Oro. The trophy is made in Chile, by a local company called Broncerías Chile.

== Antorcha de Plata ==
The Antorcha de Plata (transl. Silver Torch) was usually the first prize given to an artist at the request of the public during his presentation.

This award was created in 1983, with the objective of regulating the delivery of Gaviotas de Plata to the artist by popular demand and reserve it exclusively for the winners of the International and Folk Competitions. It was definitively replaced by the Gaviota de Plata in the LVI Viña Festival.

== Antorcha de Oro ==
The Antorcha de Oro (transl. Golden Torch) was usually the top prize given to an artist at the request of the public during his presentation.

This award was created to avoid delivery of the Gaviotas to an artist at the request of the public. However, public pressure urged the delivery of as many Antorchas as Gaviotas, as this prize the second given to an artist before the delivery of the Gaviota de Plata. It was definitively replaced by the Gaviota de Plata in the LVI Viña Festival.
