= Karen Lawrence (writer) =

Canadian writer (born 1951)

- Born: February 5, 1951 (age 75); Windsor, Ontario
- Occupations: novelist, poet
- Writing career
- Period: 1980s-1990s
- Notable work: The Life of Helen Alone

Karen Lawrence (born February 5, 1951, in Windsor, Ontario) is a Canadian writer, who was awarded the Books in Canada First Novel Award for her 1986 novel The Life of Helen Alone.

Lawrence studied at the University of Windsor and the University of Alberta. At the time of her award win, she resided in San Diego, California, with her husband.

Her second novel, Springs of Living Water, was published in 1990. In addition to her novels, Lawrence released two poetry collections, and published several short stories in literary magazines.

== Works ==
- The Inanna Poems (1980)
- The Life of Helen Alone (1986, ISBN 9780394552286)
- Springs of Living Water (1990, ISBN 9780394568089)
