= Tyler Hellard =

Canadian writer

Tyler Hellard is a Canadian writer, whose debut novel Searching for Terry Punchout was shortlisted for the Amazon.ca First Novel Award and the Kobo Emerging Writer Prize in 2019.

Originally from Summerside, Prince Edward Island, Hellard graduated from St. Francis Xavier University. He is currently based in Calgary, Alberta.
