= Guillaume Morissette =

Canadian novelist

Guillaume Morissette (born 1983) is a Canadian fiction writer and poet based in Montreal, Quebec. His work has frequently been associated with the Alt Lit movement, with Dazed & Confused magazine describing him as "Canada's Alt Lit poster boy." He has published stories, poems and essays online and in print, in venues such as Maisonneuve, Little Brother, Broken Pencil, Shabby Doll House and Thought Catalog, and was listed as one of CBC Books' "Writers to Watch" for 2014.

His first novel, New Tab, was published in 2014 by Véhicule Press. New Tab was shortlisted by the Quebec Writers' Federation for the 2014 Paragraphe Hugh MacLennan Prize for Fiction, and for the 2015 amazon.ca First Novel Award.

Morissette is also the author of the collection of stories and poems I Am My Own Betrayal, which was published in 2012 by Maison Kasini.

== See also ==
- Metatron Press
