= And Then She Fell =

2023 novel by Alicia Elliott

And Then She Fell: A Novel
- Author: Alicia Elliott
- Genre: Literary fiction, Horror
- Set in: Toronto
- Publisher: E. P. Dutton
- Publication date: 26 September 2023
- Pages: 368
- Awards: Amazon Canada First Novel Award
- ISBN: 9780593473085

And Then She Fell is the 2023 debut novel of Tuscarora author Alicia Elliott. The book was longlisted for the Women's Prize for Fiction and won the Amazon Canada First Novel Award. It is sometimes described as a horror novel.

== Synopsis and reception ==
The novel tells the story of Alice, a Mohawk woman and first-time mother living in Toronto, who is experiencing racism at the same time that her mental health is deteriorating. The protagonist believes she must modernize and retell her people's creation story.

The book is partly inspired by Elliott's mother's experience with mania and psychosis, and informed by Elliot's own experience of a psychotic break in 2020. Kirkus Reviews compared it favourably to "The Yellow Wallpaper", the 1891 feminist short story by Charlotte Perkins Gilman, while Quill & Quire noted similar themes to the 2017 horror film Get Out. They also praised Elliott's "harrowing depiction of mental illness and an inventive exploration of storytelling as a form of inheritance and survival", and note that the book illustrates how trauma can extend and even compound across generations.

== Awards ==
And Then She Fell was included in the longlist for the 2024 Women's Prize for Fiction. That same year, it won the Amazon Canada First Novel Award, valued at $60,000.
