= Milrose Munce and the Den of Professional Help =

2007 book by Douglas Cooper

- First edition
- Author: Douglas Cooper
- Cover artist: Anita Fontaine
- Genre: Gothic, Young adult
- Publisher: Doubleday Canada
- Publication date: 2007
- Publication place: Canada
- Media type: Print (paperback)and Kindle digital
- Pages: 225 (British edition)
- ISBN: 978-1-84724-428-4

Milrose Munce and the Den of Professional Help is a 2007 young adult novel by Douglas Anthony Cooper and is his first book in the genre.

== Synopsis ==
The book follows teenagers Milrose and Arabella, who can see the ghosts inhabiting their school. While some of these spirits are friendly and others less so, when both teenagers are sent to the school psychologist for treatment, the ghosts must find a way to help them escape their seemingly well-meaning captor.

== Reviews ==
Sowetan gave a positive review for the book, saying it "is one of those books that make you question why you ever decided on getting professional help in the first place".
