= Jessica Johns =

Cree writer from Canada

- Education: MacEwan University; University of British Columbia
- Writing career
- Language: English
- Notable work: Bad Cree
- Website: jessicasbjohns.com

Jessica Johns is a Cree writer from Canada, whose debut novel Bad Cree was published in 2023.

== Early life and education ==
Johns is a member of the Sucker Creek First Nation in northern Alberta. She grew up on her traditional territory in Treaty 8. She lived in Adelaide, Australia, from ages 14 to 16. Johns majored in English at Grant MacEwan University and has an MFA in Creative Writing from the University of British Columbia.

== Career ==
While she was an MFA student, a creative writing teacher told Johns' class to never write about dreams. Johns wrote Bad Cree in part as a response to this, advice which Johns disagreed with due to the importance of dreams in Cree culture. It was expanded from her earlier short story of the same name, which won the Journey Prize in 2020.

Bad Cree was published in 2023 by HarperCollins Canada. The novel won the MacEwan Book of the Year award, the Georges Bugnet Award for Fiction, the ALA Alex Award, and was a shortlisted finalist for the 2023 Amazon.ca First Novel Award. Bad Cree was selected for the 2024 edition of Canada Reads, where it was defended by Dallas Soonias.

== Awards and honours ==
Awards for Johns's writing
Year	Title	Award	Result	Ref.
2019	How Not to Spill	bpNichol Chapbook Award		
2020	"Bad Cree"	Journey Prize	Winner	
2023	Bad Cree	Amazon.ca First Novel Award	Shortlist	
2023	Bad Cree	MacEwan Book of the Year	Winner	
2024	Bad Cree	ALA Alex Award	Winner	
2024	Bad Cree	Audie Award for Thriller/Suspense	Finalist	
2024	Bad Cree	CBC Canada Reads	Nominee	
2024	Bad Cree	Georges Bugnet Award for Fiction	Winner	
2024		Rakuten Kobo Emerging Writer Prize	Shortlist	

== Personal life ==
Johns lives in Edmonton with her girlfriend and three cats.

== Publications ==
- How Not to Spill. Rahila's Ghost Press. 2018. ISBN 9781775116776.
- Donaldson, Emily (ed.). "The Bull of Cromdale". Best Canadian Essays 2019. Biblioasis.
- Jones, Amy; Lau, Doretta; Mutonji, Téa, eds. (2020). "Bad Cree". The Journey Prize Stories 32: The Best of Canada's New Writers. McClelland & Stewart. pp. 67–78. ISBN 9780771050992.
- Forget, André, ed. (2022). "Good Bones". After Realism: 24 Stories for the 21st Century. Vehicule Press. ISBN 9781550655964.
- Bad Cree. Doubleday. 2023. ISBN 9780385548694.
- Thin Spaces. Avid Reader Press, HarperCollins. 2027.
