= Dennis Bock =

Canadian writer and lecturer

Dennis Bock (born August 28, 1964) is a Canadian novelist and short story writer, lecturer at the University of Toronto, travel writer and book reviewer. His novel Going Home Again was published in Canada by HarperCollins and in the US by Alfred A. Knopf in August 2013. It was shortlisted for the 2013 Scotiabank Giller Prize.

Going Home Again earned a review in Kirkus Review.

The Communist's Daughter, published by HarperCollins in Canada and Knopf in the US in 2006, and later in France, the Netherlands, Greece and Poland, is a retelling of the final years in the life of the Canadian surgeon Norman Bethune.

His first novel, The Ash Garden, about various kinds of fallout from the Hiroshima bomb, was published in 2001, and was shortlisted for the Books in Canada First Novel Award and the International Dublin Literary Award, the Kiriyama Pacific Rim Prize, and the Commonwealth Writers' Prize (Regional Best Book). It won the 2002 Canada-Japan Literary Award and has been published in translation in Spain, Argentina, Japan, the Netherlands, Italy, Germany, France and Greece. Bock was reviewed in The Los Angeles Times and The New York Times (by Michiko Kakutani). His editor at Knopf, starting with The Ash Garden, was Gary Fisketjon.

After serving as fiction editor at the literary journal Blood & Aphorisms and holding writing residences at Yaddo, the Banff Centre, and Fundacion Valparaiso, in Spain, Bock published his first book, a short story collection Olympia, in 1998, for which he won the Danuta Gleed Literary Award for the best debut short story collection in Canada, the Canadian Authors' Association Jubilee Award, and the Betty Trask Award in the UK.

His short stories have appeared in Glimmer Train, The Penguin Book of Canadian Short Stories, The Journey Prize Anthology, and Coming Attractions. His travel writing and book reviews appear in The Globe and Mail, The National Post, The Washington Post, and Outpost Magazine.

== Personal life ==
Dennis Bock was born August 28, 1964, in Belleville, Ontario. He studied English literature and philosophy at the University of Western Ontario, and took one year off during that time to live in Spain. After completing his degree he returned to Madrid, Spain, where he lived for 4 years. It was there he finished writing Olympia. Bock lives in Toronto and has two sons. He teaches at the University of Toronto and is on faculty at Humber College's School for Writers.

== Prizes and honours ==
Awards for Bock's writing
Year	Title	Award	Result
1998	Olympia	Danuta Gleed Literary Award	Winner
1998	Olympia	Betty Trask Award	Winner
1999	Olympia	City of Toronto Book Award	Shortlist
2001	The Ash Garden	Books in Canada First Novel Award	Shortlist
2001	The Ash Garden	Commonwealth Writers' Prize for Regional Best Book	Shortlist
2002	The Ash Garden	Kiriyama Pacific Rim Prize	Shortlist
2002	The Ash Garden	International Dublin Literary Award	Shortlist
2002	The Ash Garden	Canada-Japan Literary Award	Winner
2012	Going Home Again	Scotiabank Giller Prize	Shortlist

== Bibliography ==
=== Novels ===
- The Ash Garden (2001)
- The Communist's Daughter (2006)
- Going Home Again (2013)
- The Good German (2020); not to be confused with the 2001 novel by Joseph Kanon

=== Short stories ===
- Olympia (1998)
