= Myriam Lacroix =

Canadian writer

Myriam Lacroix is a Canadian writer whose debut novel How It Works Out was a shortlisted finalist for the 2025 Amazon.ca First Novel Award.

Born and raised in Montreal, Quebec, she moved to Ontario in high school and then to Vancouver to study creative writing at the University of British Columbia. While at UBC she came out as queer. She later attended Syracuse University's creative writing MFA program.

While she grew up as a francophone and writes in French professionally, she learned English by reading anglophone literature and writes creatively in English as English literature has been a stronger influence on her creative voice. How It Works Out, published in 2024, is a collection of linked stories inspired by her own first same-sex relationship, with each chapter of the book taking place in a different timeline within a multiverse.
