= Michel Basilières =

Canadian writer

- Born: 1960 (age 65–66); Montreal, Quebec
- Occupation: Novelist
- Writing career
- Language: English
- Years active: 2003-present
- Genre: Fiction
- Notable work: Black Bird
- Notable awards: Amazon.ca First Novel Award (2004)

Michel Basilières (born 1960 in Montreal) is a Canadian writer, best known for his 2003 debut novel Black Bird.

== Background ==
Basilières, the son of a Québécois father and an English Canadian mother, grew up as an anglophone despite his French surname. He studied creative writing at Concordia University, but dropped out before graduating, and spent much of his adult life working in bookstores in both Montreal and Toronto.

== Career ==
Black Bird was published in 2003 as part of Knopf Canada's New Faces of Fiction series of works by emerging writers. A comic, magic realist take on the October Crisis of 1970, the novel won the 2004 Books in Canada First Novel Award, and was shortlisted for the Stephen Leacock Memorial Medal for Humour and the Commonwealth Writers' Prize for Best First Novel.

Following his award win, Basilières was a freelance book reviewer for the Toronto Star, the National Post and The Globe and Mail, and taught creative writing at the University of Toronto.

His second novel, A Free Man, published in 2015, was a ReLit Award finalist in 2016.

== Awards ==
Awards for Basilières's writing
Year	Title	Award	Result	Ref.
2004	Black Bird	Books in Canada First Novel Award	Winner	
2004	Black Bird	Commonwealth Writers' Prize for Best First Novel	Shortlist	
2004	Black Bird	Stephen Leacock Memorial Medal for Humour	Shortlist	
2016	A Free Man	ReLit Award for Novel	Shortlist	

== Publications ==
- Black Bird. Vintage Books. 2003. ISBN 978-0-676-97528-4.
- A Free Man. a misFit book. 2015. ISBN 978-1-770-41233-0.
