= The Ash Garden =

Book by Dennis Bock

- Author: Dennis Bock
- Language: English
- Publisher: HarperCollins, Knopf, Bloomsbury
- Publication date: August 25, 2001
- Publication place: Canada, United States, UK
- Media type: Print (hardback & paperback)
- Pages: 281
- ISBN: 978-0-375-41302-5
- OCLC: 46929224
- Dewey Decimal: 813/.54 21
- LC Class: PR9199.3.B559 A9 2001

The Ash Garden is a novel written by Canadian author Dennis Bock and published in 2001. It is Bock's first novel, following the 1998 release of Olympia, a collection of short stories. The Ash Garden follows the stories of three main characters affected by World War II: Hiroshima bombing victim Emiko, German nuclear physicist Anton Böll, and Austrian-Jewish refugee Sophie Böll. The narrative is non-linear, jumping between different times and places, and the point of view alternates between the characters; Emiko's story being written in the first person while Anton and Sophie's stories are written in the third person. Bock took several years to write the novel, re-writing several drafts, before having it published in August 2001 by HarperCollins (Canada), Alfred A. Knopf (USA) and Bloomsbury (UK).

Critics gave it mostly positive reviews and it became a best-seller in Canada. It was nominated for the International Dublin Literary Award, the Books in Canada First Novel Award, and the Kiriyama Prize. It has been analysed in several literature journals, including Canadian Ethnic Studies which noted the similarities between the character Emiko and the Hiroshima Maidens.

== Background ==
At the time of publication, author Dennis Bock was 36 years old and living in Toronto. He had previously published a book of short stories called Olympia, but struggled with this project that would become his first novel, taking several years to write the novel. Doubleday Canada originally owned the rights but Bock withdrew the book from Doubleday citing "a difference of opinion" between himself and the editor. He had written two drafts, including one in which the main character was an art historian involved in art theft and looting during World War II. With a working title of A Man of Principle, Bock gave the draft to editor Phyllis Bruce in 1999 and sold it to Knopf for US$250,000. He re-wrote most of the book with the help of Bruce, and two other editors, Gary Fisketjon of Knopf and Liz Calder of Bloomsbury (who published the book in the UK).

== Summary ==
The narrative alternates between three characters (Emiko, Anton and Sophie) and takes place around the fiftieth anniversary of the atomic bombing of Hiroshima, though the back story of each character is told. Emiko was a small girl living in Hiroshima with her parents, younger brother, and grandfather during World War II. Following the atomic bombing, with her parents dead, Emiko and her brother recover in a hospital and her grandfather cares for patients. Though her brother dies, Emiko travels to the United States as part of a group of girls receiving reconstructive surgery. On the way, the American media takes an interest in the girls and she appears on an episode of This Is Your Life thanking the American audience for bringing her to the US. She later becomes a documentary filmmaker and, in 1995, approaches Anton Böll to be part of a new project.

My own unceasing pain erased any concern for those people. I did not care. There are things you get used to. There are things you learn not to see. I came to a point where I would not have cared if they all had died, and might not even have noticed them if somehow I'd been given the promise that my brother and I would leave this place together and alive. I am not proud of this. I would not know the truth of such a terrible confession had I not lived through that time.

— Emiko in a Hiroshima hospital, The Ash Garden, page 34.

Anton was a scientist in Nazi Germany who, following a disagreement regarding the direction of its nuclear program, is recruited by the US and flees via France, Spain, and Portugal. He becomes a part of the Manhattan Project, witnesses the tests, and travels to Hiroshima recording the aftermath. Anton regrets the consequences of the atomic bombs, attends the Pugwash Conference, but maintains his belief that it was necessary to end the war and prevented more deaths. He marries Sophie and becomes a professor at Columbia University in New York. With Sophie, he retires to a small town outside of Toronto.

As World War II was beginning, Sophie's Jewish parents sent her away from Austria. She was on board of the MS St. Louis when it was turned away from Cuba and sent to the United Kingdom. She was living in a refugee camp in Canada when she met Anton. She was diagnosed with lupus and takes up gardening, planning elaborate landscapes every year. In 1995, after refusing further medical treatments, and with Anton by her side, she succumbs to the disease.

After Sophie's funeral Anton reveals to Emiko the extent to which he had been involved in Emiko's life. He first met her while volunteering at the hospital in which her grandfather was working. Feeling he had to make amends in some way, he ensured that Emiko was on the list of girls to get reconstructive surgery, and secretly filmed her at memorial events. He had been waiting for her to find him.

== Style and themes ==
The portions of the book that follow the character Emiko Amai is written as a first-person narrative, while the portions following Sophie and Anton Böll use the third-person. The tone was described as "disturbingly calm". Its central theme is that of identity and attempts to find solace. Bock states "All three of the main characters in The Ash Garden are refugees who don't belong anywhere. Each has a desperate search for home." In Harper's Magazine, Pico Iyer compares The Ash Garden with Michael Ondaatje's The English Patient as "a book that ends where Bock's begins". An essay in the journal Canadian Ethnic Studies, looked at The Ash Garden from the a Japanese historical perspective, finding strong similarities between the real-life Hiroshima Maiden Shigeko and the character Emiko, but noting it was not a roman à clef.

== Publication and reception ==
The book was released as a hardcover on August 25, 2001, published by HarperCollins in Canada, Alfred A. Knopf in the United States, and Bloomsbury in the United Kingdom. Knopf ordered an initial print run of 60,000 copies. It debuted at the #2 spot on the Maclean's fiction bestseller list and peaked at #1 in late September and early October. It was translated and published in multiple languages, including Japanese and German. The book was a finalist for the 2001 for the Books in Canada First Novel Award, as well as the Kiriyama Prize, an international literary award for promoting greater understanding of the Pacific Rim and South Asia. It was nominated by the Vancouver Public Library and the Bergen Public Library for the 2003 International Dublin Literary Award.

In Time, Brian T. Bennett wrote, "The Ash Garden may not be a page-turner, but Bock's prose lures the reader along through smooth, sculpted sentences full of rich detail and subtle meditation." In Maclean's magazine, Brian Bethune wrote, "Intellectually engaging, beautifully written and powered by three memorable characters, The Ash Garden will seduce anyone who reads it." In the Christian Science Monitor, fiction critic Ron Charles wrote "Bock moves back and forth through time in a series of exquisite scenes, always keeping his vision tightly focused, despite the world-altering events he describes. ... What makes the novel so compelling and disturbing, though, is its emotional restraint." Regarding the quality of the prose, a review in the Quill & Quire said "Bock's writing is both dense and immensely readable" while the review in Library Journal "highly recommended" it. In Books in Canada one reviewer highlighted that on "occasions, the prose turns mannered and cliches pop up". though a later review by W. P. Kinsella called it a "brilliant novel...[with] superb plot twists that make it a spellbinding adventure in reading".

A Japanese review in the Yomiuri Shimbun noted "something inaccessible about all three [characters...who are] as remote to each other as they [are] to the reader, and thus are never truly empathetic". The review in The New York Times by literary critic Michiko Kakutani called it "an elegant, unnerving novel" but that Bock "tries too hard to underscore those links by using leitmotifs to connect his characters' experiences". In London, the review in The Sunday Telegraph was more critical, finding it "is badly let down by its form, a split-time-scale narrative...[and] is significantly short of narrative dynamism", while novelist Amanda Craig concludes that it "reads as the work of a young writer who is straining with too much effort".
