= Eva Stachniak =

Polish-Canadian novelist

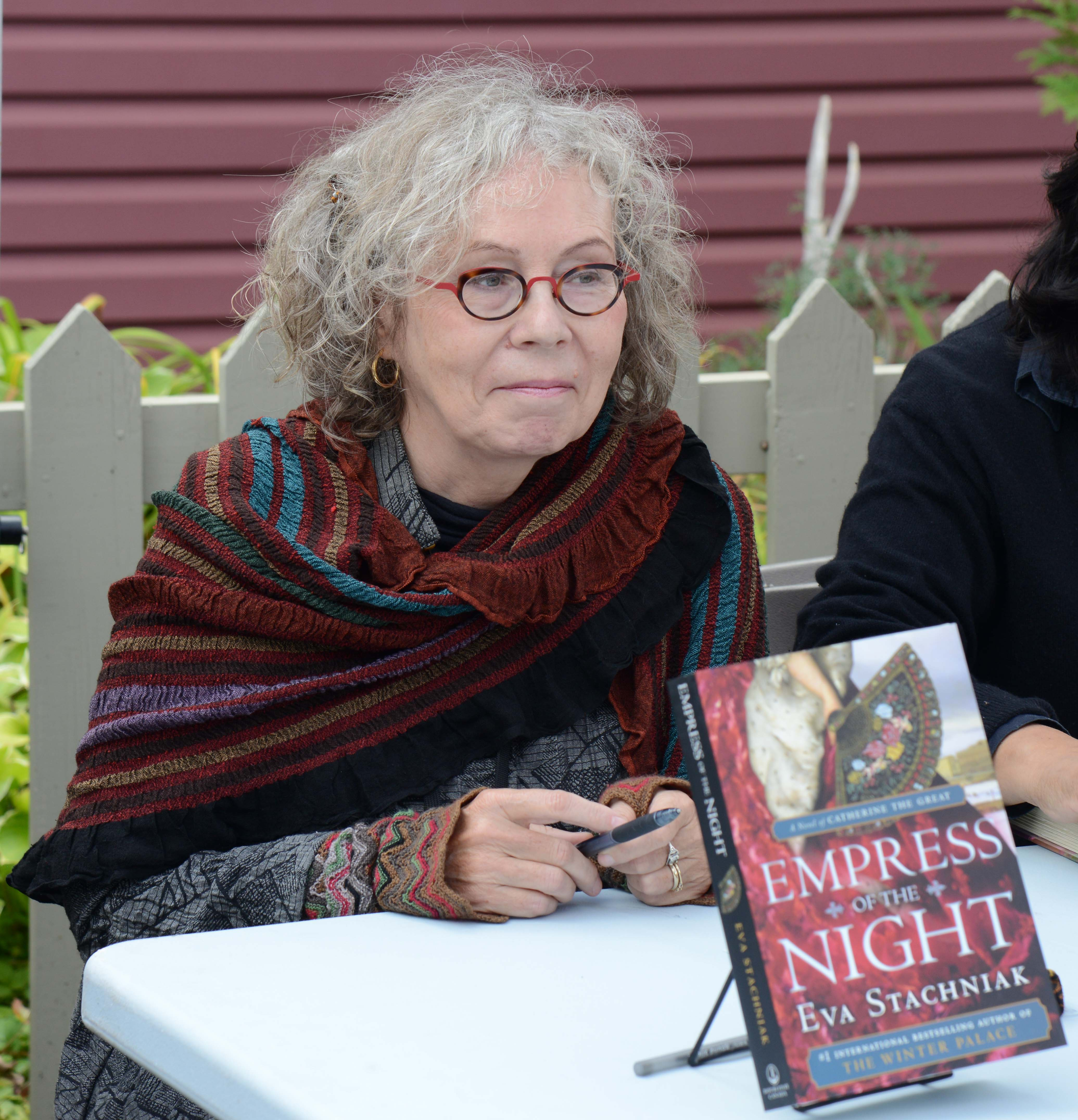
- Stachniak at the Eden Mills Writers' Festival in 2014
- Born: November 27, 1952 (age 73); Wrocław, Poland
- Occupation: novelist
- Writing career
- Period: 2000s-present
- Notable works: Necessary Lies, The Winter Palace

Eva Stachniak (born 1952) is a Polish-Canadian novelist.

== Biography ==
Stachniak came to Canada in 1981 to study at McGill University, and remained in the country after the imposition of martial law in Poland prevented her from returning home. She worked for Radio Canada International from 1984 to 1986, and then moved to Toronto to teach at Sheridan College.

Her debut novel Necessary Lies, published in 2000, won the Books in Canada First Novel Award. Her second novel, Garden of Venus, followed in 2005. The book was also published under the title Dancing with Kings in the United Kingdom.

Her third novel, The Winter Palace, was published in 2012. A historical novel about Catherine the Great, The Winter Palace became Stachniak's first Canadian and international bestseller. She followed with a sequel novel, Empress of the Night, in 2014.

She has also published short stories in literary magazines and anthologies.

== Works ==
- Necessary Lies (2000, ISBN 978-0889242951)
- Garden of Venus (2005, ISBN 978-0002005784)
- The Winter Palace (2012, ISBN 978-0553386899)
- Empress of the Night (2014, ISBN 978-0553808131)
- The Chosen Maiden (2017, ISBN 978-0385678568)
- The School of Mirrors (2022)
