= Bad Cree =

2023 novel by Jessica Johns

- Author: Jessica Johns
- Language: English (main text), Cree language (chapter titles)
- Genre: Horror
- Set in: High Prairie, Vancouver
- Published: 10 Jan 2023
- Publisher: HarperCollins
- Publication place: Canada
- Pages: 272
- ISBN: 9780385548694

Bad Cree is a 2023 horror novel, the debut novel by Jessica Johns. It tells the story of Mackenzie, a Cree woman, who is plagued by supernatural nightmares after the death of her sister.

== Plot ==
Mackenzie, a Cree woman, moves from High Prairie, Alberta to Vancouver after the death of her Kokum, or grandmother. One year previously, her sister Sabrina also suddenly died from a ruptured brain aneurysm. Mackenzie begins having strange dreams; when she awakens, pieces of the dreams return with her to the physical world. In one dream, crows eat Sabrina's corpse; Mackenzie kills one barehanded. She wakes from the dream with a decapitated crow's head in her palm.

Eventually, Mackenzie confides in her family and returns home. She attempts to reconcile with her surviving sister Tracey, who is angry that Mackenzie did not return home for Sabrina's funeral. She also reconnects with her cousin Kassidy, her parents, and various aunties.

Mackenzie's dreams eventually concentrate on a night three years prior. She, Tracey, Sabrina, and Kassidy were at a party near a local lake. Tracey and Sabrina got lost in the woods; Mackenzie and Kassidy refused to go in after them. Tracey and Sabrina eventually found their way back, but Tracey recalls that Sabrina was “changed” by the experience.

Mackenzie's dreams of Sabrina sometimes include versions with gray hair and rotting skin. Mackenzie and her family come to believe that they are being haunted by a wheetigo. The wheetigo feeds on negative emotions and has latched onto Mackenzie's family after the death of their Kokum.

Mackenzie, Tracey, and Kassidy return to the lake where Sabrina encountered the wheetigo. The three women work together to kill the creature. Mackenzie plans to return to Vancouver, but promises to visit home often. Mackenzie is visited by Kokum's spirit in a dream.

== Style ==
The novel is written in present tense. According to Gabino Iglesias, this gives the novel "a sense of immediacy." More than half of the novel is about dreams, and most of the scenes involving Mackenzie's waking life involve her memories. The narrative contains "constant shifting between past, present, memory, and dream".

Quill & Quire noted that the novel plays with horror genre conventions. According to Michelle Cyca's review, "The set-up of Bad Cree is a classic horror novel: an unravelling protagonist, a supernatural threat, a simmering repressed trauma. But these familiar elements are transformed into new, surprising forms through the vivid cultural specificity of Johns’s Cree worldview." In many horror novels, characters who explained their supernatural experiences would be immediately dismissed by other characters. Due to the nature of dreaming in Cree culture, Mackenzie's experiences are accepted and never questioned by her family members. The review concludes that "Johns rejects the genre convention of the lone survivor, opting instead to explore the power of interdependence and kinship."

== Background ==
As related by the CBC and Quill & Quire, Johns stated that she once had a professor who told the whole class not to write about dreams. Michelle Cyca noted that "Cree people take dreams seriously as a form of knowledge production and a method of communication with their ancestors. To see them dismissed as fundamentally unserious and unworthy of literary consideration was a challenge that Johns couldn’t ignore." Johns began by writing a short story that eventually developed into Bad Cree.

== Reception ==
In a starred review, Publishers Weekly called the novel a "haunting debut", writing that it "works equally well as spine-tingling thriller and a touching meditation on grief." Kirkus Reviews wrote that "Johns uses classic horror tropes to explore experiences that are specific to Indigenous people." The review stated that the novel was a "powerful exploration of generational trauma and an artful, affecting debut."

Kristin Crawford of Anishinabek News praised the fact that Mackenzie is not sexualized and that romance is not a major factor in the story. Crawford praised the bonds between Mackenzie and her family members, as well as the inclusion of a minor nonbinary character. The reviewer felt that physical descriptors of the characters were lacking, and found the pacing inconsistent. Despite this, Crawford was satisfied with the ending and found the book to be worth reading.

Writing for Locus, Gabino Iglesias called Bad Cree a "strong debut" and wrote that the novel is "deeply rooted in Cree culture. Mackenzie has a hard time accepting what she’s experiencing, but conversations with family back home open her eyes to the many ways in which Cree people see dreams, death, reality, and even the future." Iglesias states that "Johns joins a stellar group of Native American writers like Stephen Graham Jones, Erika T. Wurth, and Shane Hawk in bringing her heritage and culture to the page and sharing it with the world." Quill and Quire stated that "[w]ith Bad Cree, Johns demonstrates that it’s possible to craft a bone-chilling novel that has, at its core, a warm, beating heart."

Olivia Ho of the Straits Times gave the novel four stars, calling it a "slow-burn horror novel" and "a chilling tale of grief." Ho states that "Indigenous horror stories like Bad Cree seek to reclaim myths and folklore that have been appropriated by mainstream pop culture. In this case, it is the wheetigo... Johns brings the creature back to its roots. A spectre of ecological depredation, it also becomes a monstrous manifestation of the all-consuming, insidious nature of grief."

=== Awards ===
Year	Award	Category	Result	Ref.
2023	Amazon Canada First Novel Award	—	Finalist	
2024	Alex Awards	—	Won	
2024	Aurora Award	Novel	Finalist	
2024	Canada Reads	—	Finalist	
