= Lisa Bird-Wilson =

American author and poet

- Occupation: Author, poet
- Education: University of Saskatchewan
- Genre: Fiction, nonfiction, poetry
- Notable awards: Fiction Award finalist 2022 Probably Ruby; Amazon First Novel Award finalist 2022 Probably Ruby; Danuta Gleed Award finalist 2014 Just Pretending; National Magazine Awards Silver Medal, Column 2019

Website
- lisabirdwilson.com

Lisa Bird-Wilson is a Métis and nêhiyaw writer from Saskatchewan.

== Personal life ==
A survivor of the Sixties Scoop, as a child Bird-Wilson was adopted, disconnecting her from her Cree and Métis heritage. This experience informs much of her writing. She earned bachelor of Arts (1993), Bachelor of Education (1999), and Master of Education (2005) degrees from the University of Saskatchewan.

== Career ==
Bird-Wilson's debut collection of short stories, Just Pretending (2013), was chosen as the Saskatchewan Library Association's 2019 One Book One Province. The book won four Saskatchewan Book Awards (including 2014 book of the year), and was a finalist for the 2014 Danuta Gleed Literary Award. Reviewing the stories for The /tƐmz/ Review, Amy Mitchell says "the stories and characters are so alive, and the writing is so beautiful in its stripped-down simplicity."

She has also published poetry and non-fiction books.

As of 2021, Bird-Wilson is CEO of the Gabriel Dumont Institute, the education arm of the Métis Nation-Saskatchewan. She is also a founding board member and chair of the Ânskohk Aboriginal Writers' Circle and founding president of the Saskatchewan Aboriginal Literacy Network.

== Awards ==
2014

- Shortlisted for the Danuta Gleed Literary Award for Just Pretending
- University of Regina Book of the Year for Just Pretending
- SaskPower Fiction Award for Just Pretending
- Rasmussen, Rasmussen & Charowsky Aboriginal Peoples' Writing Award for Just Pretending
- First Nations University of Canada Aboriginal Peoples' Publishing Award for Just Pretending
- YWCA Women of Distinction Award for Arts, Culture or Heritage

2017

- John Hodgin's Founder Award for short story "Counselling"

2018

- Saskatchewan Arts Board, RBC Emerging Artist Award

2019

- Silver Medal, Column, National Magazine Awards for "Clowns, Cake, Canoes: This is Canada?"

2022

- Shortlisted for the Amazon.ca First Novel Award for Probably Ruby
- Finalist for the 2022 Governor General's Award for English Fiction for "Probably Ruby"; 2022

== Works ==
- An Institute of Our Own: A History of the Gabriel Dumont Institute, non-fiction (Gabriel Dumont Press, 2011)
- Just Pretending, short stories (Coteau Books, 2013)
- The Red Files, poetry (Nightwood Editions, 2016)
- Probably Ruby, novel (Doubleday Canada, 2021)
