= Ibi Kaslik =

Canadian novelist, freelance journalist, and professor of creative writing

- Born: August 20, 1973 (age 53); Toronto, Ontario, Canada
- Occupations: Novelist, Writer
- Writing career
- Genre: Literature
- Notable work: Skinny Angel Riots

Ibolya "Ibi" Kaslik (born August 20, 1973) is a Canadian novelist, freelance journalist, and professor of creative writing at the University of Toronto.

== Early life ==
Born in Toronto, Ontario, Kaslik attended high school at Etobicoke School of the Arts. She went on to major in creative writing at Concordia University and graduated with a Masters of Arts in Creative Writing and English Literature.

== Career ==
Kaslik's short stories and articles have appeared in literary magazines such as Matrix and Geist. Her debut novel, Skinny, was published by HarperCollins in May 2004. It was shortlisted for the Books in Canada First Novel Award in 2004, the CLA Best Young Adult Book in 2005 and the Borders Original Voice Award in 2006. Skinny also appeared on the New York Times best sellers list for two consecutive weeks in 2008.

In 2007/08, Kaslik served as the 22nd writer-in-residence at the Regina Public Library in Regina, Saskatchewan.

Her second novel, The Angel Riots, about a rising indie rock band from Montreal, was published by Penguin Canada in February 2008. It has been suggested that the band in the novel is based partially on Broken Social Scene. She attended the Etobicoke School of the Arts with members of the band and helped them on their first tour of Canada and the United States. Although Kaslik says "It's definitely based on a world that I know", she has brushed off claims that the connection goes very deep, saying "it would be mistaken and scurrilous to try to identify individual people"

Kaslik states that she is currently working on three new pieces of prose, one which she claims is titled Mini and the Courage Poncho, a book illustrated by Stef Lenk and aimed toward children.

== Published works ==
- Skinny (2004)
- The Angel Riots (2008)
- Tales from the Tundra: A Collection of Inuit Stories (2010)
