= Black Bird (Basilières novel) =

2003 novel by Michel Basilières

- First edition cover
- Author: Michel Basilières
- Publisher: Knopf Canada
- Publication date: January 1, 2003
- ISBN: 978-0-676-97527-7

Black Bird is a 2003 novel by Canadian writer Michel Basilières, first published by Knopf Canada. Set in Montreal during a time that resembles the October Crisis, the novel centres on the Desouche household, where both English and French members live together in squalor. It was a Globe and Mail Best Book of the Year, and gained praise with critics across Canada.

== Plot summary ==
Grandfather Desouche, a pessimistic old French Montrealer, makes a living by digging bodies out of their graves and selling the embalmed corpses to a doctor who uses them for medical experiments. When the winter comes, the frozen ground forces Grandfather and Uncle to retire for the season. Grandfather, after his wife's death, has taken to hating his neighbors and indulging in food and drink. Grandfather decides to marry Aline Souris, a spinster who cares for her widower father. She becomes the woman of the house, caring for the house and for Grandfather. Aline realizes that Grandfather tricked her into marrying him in order to have someone to take care of him.

Granddaughter Marie Desouche, a leading member of the Front de libération du Québec, is abhorred by her family's Anglo-ism. Her boyfriend Hubert is the leader of their cell. Her brother Jean-Baptiste, a quiet romantic poet, opposes his sister's burning idealism, and spends most of his time reading and writing. One night, after planting a bomb next to a crowded restaurant, Marie comes home to find a police car outside her house and is immediately alarmed. She forces her brother to be her alibi, insinuating that they were having sex. It turns out the police were there to inform their Mother of the death of her father, Angus, who was killed by Marie's bomb. Mother is destroyed by this news, and enters a coma-like state. Marie leaves to live with Hubert.

Recognizing her marriage to Grandfather as a sham, Aline moves into Marie's vacated room. She becomes attached to his pet crow, which she names "Grace". Grandfather gradually comes to hate the crow as his wife gains affection for it. Eventually Grace attacks Grandfather and scratches out one of his eyes. Dr. Hyde becomes depressed at his mother's condition. Her friends, Mrs. Harrison and Mrs. Pangloss, come every week to visit hoping she will recover. She, however, cannot hear a word they are saying when they try to speak to her. Grandfather becomes increasingly frustrated with his new handicap, a missing eye, but realizes that it is an excuse to be bed-ridden and have Aline wait on him hand and foot.

At Christmas, the Desouches gather, and Marie gives Jean-Baptiste a blank book, a statement of her dislike of empty words but instead he chooses to write a play. Meanwhile, Hubert has a drunken disagreement with his own father and wanders off very drunk. He gets hit by a car while shouting separatist manifestos into the night air. Ironically, he gets hit by a personal hero of his and is killed in the accident. The local police do not want the premier's reputation, so take the corpse to Grandfather to be disposed of. Grandfather charges a high price for the body. Marie becomes the head of her FLQ division. Meanwhile, Jean-Baptiste becomes a political paraiah over the summer, thanks to the play he wrote about his family, creating a sensation. He is arrested by the police when Marie sneaks felquiste pamphlets into his possessions.

Hoping to free her brother, Marie kidnaps a British government official and holds him hostage. Meanwhile, Dr. Hyde experiments on Hubert's corpse, trying to revive him. He offers Grandfather and Uncle a pretty sum if they extract the bleeding heart of Frere Andre from the Cathedral so he can insert the heart into Hubert's corpse, and thus find out where the human soul dwells. On Hallowe'en, he revives Hubert, Marie strangles the British diplomat, and Jean-Baptiste is finally let out of jail. Hubert comes back to the Desouche house, looking like a Zombie made of different body parts from different corpses. When he sees Mother sleeping it becomes apparent that it is not Hubert at all but Angus dwelling in the mangled body. Mother is revived upon seeing him, and a gas leak explosion destroys the house. Aline flies out the window with Grace. After the explosion, Jean-Baptiste sees his family from a distance, Grandfather and Marie, Mother and Father, Uncle and the ruined house. He realizes that he has lost all of his writing, but understands that he can now start again. And so the book ends as it begins "Montreal, an island..."
