= Gloria Escomel =

Canadian writer (born 1941)

- Born: October 15, 1941 (age 84); Montevideo, Uruguay

Gloria Escomel (born October 15, 1941) is a Uruguayan-born Canadian writer. She first moved from Uruguay to France in 1960 to study literature at the Université de Paris, later moving to Canada to pursue her doctorate at the Université de Montréal.

Escomel was a lecturer at the Université du Québec à Montréal from 1978 to 1988, and wrote as a journalist for publications including Châtelaine, L'Actualité, Perspectives, La Gazette des femmes, Le Devoir, La Liberté and La Nouvelle barre du jour. She received the Judith Jasmin Award in 1988 for her Gazette article "Quelle vieillesse vous préparez-vous: un âge d'or ou d'argent?"

Escomel has also published novels, short stories and radio plays for Radio-Canada's Première Chaîne, as well as numerous policy documents for the Government of Quebec on disability, LGBT and human rights issues.

Escomel is an out lesbian.

== Works ==
- 1980 - La table d'écoute ou le temps-spirale (play)
- 1980 - Tu en parleras… et après ? (play)
- 1981 - J'enfante ma mémoire (play)
- 1981 - Des bâtons dans les roues (play)
- 1983 - La surdoublée (play)
- 1988 - Fruit de la passion (novel)
- 1992 - Pièges (novel)
- 1994 - Les eaux de la mémoire (short stories)
