= Terry Jordan (writer) =

Fiction writer, musician, essaying and dramatist

Terry Jordan is a fiction writer, musician, essaying and dramatist whose stage plays have been produced across the country, in the U.S and Ireland. His book of stories It's a Hard Cow, won a Saskatchewan Book Award and was nominated for the Commonwealth Book Prize. His novel, Beneath That Starry Place was published internationally. Jordan taught Creative Writing at Concordia University, Montreal, and was the first Margaret Laurence Fellow at Trent University. In the past he facilitated the Fiction workshop at Sage Hill Writing Experience, served as Writer in Residence at the Saskatoon, Regina and Winnipeg Public Libraries, and Okanagan College.

== Publications ==
- Been in the Storm So Long (novel). Coteau Books, Regina
- We're Already Home (play). Wild Sage Press, Regina.
- False Spring. Letterpress edition. New Leaf Editions, Vancouver.
- Une Constellation d'escrocs. JC Lattes, Paris, France.
- Beneath That Starry Place (novel). HarperCollins Publishers (Canada), Toronto. U.S. Edition: MacMurray and Beck Publishers, Denver/San Francisco USA.
- It's A Hard Cow (short story collection). Thistledown, Saskatoon.
- Numbers. Pachyderm, Winnipeg.
- Movie Dust. Small Poetry, San Francisco USA.
