= Yan Li (author) =

Chinese-Canadian fiction author

Yan Li (Chinese: 李彥; born 1955) is a Beijing-born Chinese-Canadian fiction author and poet who has written in both Chinese and English. In China, she worked as a translator, instructor and journalist. Having moved to Canada in 1987, her 1995 novel Daughters of the Red Land, felt by some to be autobiographical, was a finalist for a Books in Canada First Novel Award. Her novel Lily in the Snow (2009) followed a Chinese immigrant family in Ontario.

She teaches at Renison University College and has been director of the Confucius Institute at the University of Waterloo.

== Novels ==
- Daughters of the Red Land (1995)
- Lily in the Snow (2009)
