= Skinny (novel) =

2004 novel by Ibi Kaslik

- Cover of the first edition paperback
- Author: Ibi Kaslik
- Language: English
- Genre: Fiction
- Publisher: HarperCollins
- Publication date: 2004
- Publication place: Canada
- Media type: Print (hardcover, paperback)
- Pages: 247

Skinny is the debut novel by Canadian author Ibi Kaslik, first published by HarperCollins in Canada in May 2004. It appeared on the New York Times best sellers list for two consecutive weeks in 2008.

== Summary ==
Skinny is about a girl who lives with her father, step mother and 2 step sisters, both pretty, skinny, and popular. Her mother died when she was 10 and since then she has eaten to comfort her loss. "Skinny" is a voice in her ear telling her constantly how ugly and fat she is. As she makes her journey to change she is helped along by her father and her best friend, Rat.
