= Marco Castillo =

Brazilian-Canadian musician

- Born: Marco Antonio Castillo Cunha; September 19, 1963 (age 62); Rio de Janeiro, Brazil
- Origin: Winnipeg, Manitoba, Canada
- Genres: Jazz, World Music, Latin Music, Samba, Bossanova, MPB, Musica Popular Brasileira, Instrumental
- Occupations: Musician, songwriter, performer, composer
- Instruments: Vocals, guitar, bass, cuica, pandeiro, Brazilian percussion, percussion, surdo, forro, tambourine
- Years active: 1982–present
- Formerly of: Brazilian Beats
- Website: marcocastillo.ca

Marco Castillo, (Brazilian Portuguese: [ˈmaʁku kasˈtʃilu]; born September 19, 1963, in Rio de Janeiro, RJ, Brazil) is a Brazilian-Canadian musician and songwriter based in Winnipeg, Manitoba, Canada and the son of Trio Irakitan guitarist Antônio Santos Cunha.

After graduating with a B.A. in music from Estácio S.A., Rio de Janeiro in 1994, he began touring South America with some of Brazil's top acts like Brazilian singer Rosa Marya Colin.

Since immigrating to Canada in 2006, Marco Castillo has become a fixture on the Winnipeg music scene, including regular appearances at the annual Jazz Winnipeg Festival.

== Music history ==
Marco Castillo released his debut album, "Brazilian Season" in 2008.

In 2010, CBC Radio Producer Kinsey Posen selected Marco Castillo to be part of the Manitoba Cover Project where new and emerging Manitoban artists covered well known Manitoba composers. Marco Castillo's contribution was a Portuguese version of These Eyes by The Guess Who and Neil Young's Heart of Gold.

In 2012, his second album, "Trip To Brazil" won "World Recording of the Year" in 2012 at the Western Canadian Music Awards in Regina.

In 2014, Marco Castillo became a Canadian citizen and released his 3rd album, "Zabele" which was nominated for "World Recording of the Year" at the Western Canadian Music Awards in Winnipeg.

The song "Forró No Canadá" from "Zabelê" is a tribute to his new homeland in the Forró style of Brazil and a Folkloric Category finalist in the 2015 Viña del Mar International Song Festival at the Festival Viña del Mar 2015:

== Playing style ==
Marco Castillo plays a variety of Latin and World Music styles built on a foundation of jazz. The sound is as much jazz-infused world music as it is Latin-infused jazz music; one that has appealed to both jazz and world music fans. The songs are a mix of original compositions, traditional pieces, and standards, and performed solo, as a trio, and with the 8-piece Brazilian Beats.

== Discography ==
- Brazilian Season – 2008
- Trip To Brazil – 2012
- Zabelê – 2014
