= Li Yan (artist) =

Chinese painter (born 1977)

Li Yan (Chinese: 李演; pinyin: Lǐ Yǎn) is an oil painting artist, born in Jilin, China in 1977, who lives and works in Beijing, China.

== Biography ==
Li Yan was born in Jilin, China, in 1977. His solo exhibition Accident was held at the Platform China art gallery in Beijing in 2007 and was about terrorism and the Iraq War. His solo debut in the United States was at the Morono Kiang Gallery in Los Angeles. Named Quotidian Truths, it discusses how politics and sports in China converge with each other.

Libor Sečka, the ambassador of the Czech Republic to China from 2009 to 2015, wrote, "Li Yan is a reporter, chronicler, catcher, who mercilessly inscribes into his paintings all that is unusual, unexpected, destructive and cruel. All that got out of the traditional order and control. All that in one second changed the lives not only of individuals, but of hundreds and thousands in misfortune and disaster."

== Solo exhibitions ==
- 2014 Limitless, Galerie Klaus Gerrit Friese, Stuttgart
- 2011 The Catastrophic World-A Chinese paints our age, Ling Galerie, Berlin
- 2010 Accidents, Ling Galerie, Berlin
- 2009 Snippet, Yamamoto Gendai Gallery, Tokyo
- 2008 Quotidian Truths - Paintings by LiYan, Moronokiang Gallery, Los Angeles
- 2007 Accident, Platform China, Beijing

== Selected exhibitions ==
- 2017 China meets Europe, Museum Villa Haiss, Zell am Harmersbach, Germany
- 2016 17th Asian Art Biennale Bangladesh 2016, National Art Gallery, Dhaka, Bangladesh
- 2016 Root Scene – Chinese Contemporary Art Group Show, China Exchange UK, London
- 2016 Benjamin Sigg Collection "Art of Collecting", Poly Gallery Hong Kong, Cobo House, Hong Kong
- 2015 All Living Creatures Scene, Taiwan Chia Nan Museum, Tainan
- 2015 Individual Scene, The Art Gallery of Sichuan University
- 2015 Exhibition on Summer’s Threshold, Embassy of The Czech Republic in China, Beijing
- 2015 Reflections of Spring, Art Seasons Gallery, Beijing
- 2013 Dreams of China, Python Gallery, Zurich
- 2013 The Sixth Chengdu Biennale, Chengdu Contemporary Art Museum, Chengdu
- 2012 Yan Li - Li Yan: Two Sides of A Mirror, Embassy of the Czech Republic in China, Beijing
- 2011 Prague Action, China Czech Contemporary Museum, Beijing
- 2010 Emerging Artists from North, Mountain Art Beijing & Frank Lin Art Center, Beijing
- 2009 China Urban, Douglas F. Cooley Memorial Art Gallery, Reed College, Portland
- 2008 The Revolution Continues: New Art From China, Saatchi Gallery, London
- 2008 Fear, Wedel Fine Art, London
- 2008 China trifft Berlin, Emerson Gallery, Berlin
- 2008 <Self-experience> - Young Artists Group Show, Platform China, Beijing
- 2007 Beijing Lightning Factory First Exhibition, Beijing lightning factory
- 2005 The Second Chengdu Biennale, Chengdu Contemporary Art Museum, Chengdu
- 2004 The 10th National Fine Arts Exhibition—Oil Painting Exhibition, Guangdong Art Museum, Guangzhou
- 2004 Zhenxing Northeast Industry District Fine Arts Exhibition, Liaoning Art Museum, Shenyang
- 2002 Graduation Exhibition of Eight Fine Arts Academies, Hexiangning Art Museum, Shenzhen
