= Nicholas Dawson (writer) =

Canadian author

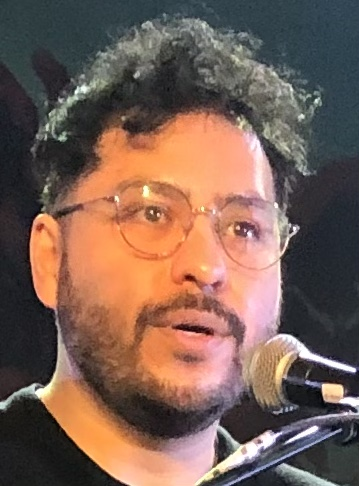
- Dawson in 2021
- Born: 1982 (age 43–44); Viña del Mar, Chile
- Years active: 2010–present

Nicholas Dawson (born 1982) is a Canadian writer from Quebec, most noted for his 2020 book Désormais, ma demeure.

== Biography ==
Born in Viña del Mar, Chile, in 1982 and raised in Montreal, he is an alumnus of the Université du Québec à Montréal. He published his debut poetry collection, La déposition des chemins, in 2010, and his debut novel Animitas in 2017.

Désormais, ma demeure, published in 2020, blended non-fiction essay with elements of poetry and autofiction in its depiction of clinical depression. The book was the winner of the 2021 Grand Prix du livre de Montréal, and of the 2021 Blue Metropolis / Conseil des arts de Montréal Diversity Prize. House Within a House, an English translation by D. M. Bradford of Désormais, ma demeure, was a finalist for the Governor General's Award for French to English translation at the 2023 Governor General's Awards.

In 2021, he published Nous sommes un continent, a collection of correspondence with writer Karine Rosso.

Dawson, who identifies as queer, served on the jury for the 2023 Dayne Ogilvie Prize.

He is the brother of writer Caroline Dawson. In 2026 he published Vida, a book inspired in part by Caroline's death of cancer in 2024.
