= 2015 Viña del Mar International Song Festival =

- Directed by: Juan Pablo González
- Presented by: Rafael Araneda; Carolina de Moras
- Country of origin: Chile

Production
- Producers: Pablo Morales; Claudio Cabezas; Antonio Vodanovic
- Production locations: Viña del Mar, Chile
- Running time: 270 minutes

Original release
- Network: Chilevisión
- Release: February 22 – February 27, 2015

The LVI Edition of the Viña del Mar International Song Festival took place from February 22 to 27, 2015, at Anfiteatro de la Quinta Vergara, in the Chilean city of Viña del Mar.

== Artists ==
=== Singers ===
- Yusuf Islam
- Alejandro Fernández
- Reik
- Emmanuel
- Ricardo Arjona
- Luis Fonsi
- Yandel
- Cultura Profética
- Pedro Aznar
- Vicentico
- Romeo Santos
- Nicole
- Nano Stern
- Noche de Brujas
- Oscar D'León

=== Comedians ===
- Dinamita Show
- Huaso Filomeno
- Centella
- Arturo Ruiz-Tagle
- Leon Murillo

== Broadcasting ==
NBC Universo broadcast the Viña del Mar Festival in the US, with more than 34 hours of exclusive coverage to include live streaming and concert specials via multiple platforms, including TV and mobile devices. In addition, the network showed a series of "best of" one-hour specialson Sundays at 8 pm for two full months, beginning on March 1.

== Controversy ==
Chilean media argued that the festival was run by male chauvinists since it only had eight female acts out of 70.

== Schedule ==
=== Day 1 (Sunday 22) ===
- Luis Fonsi
- Dinamita Show
- Yandel

=== Day 2 (Monday 23) ===
- Ricardo Arjona
- Centella
- Reik

=== Day 3 (Tuesday 24) ===
- Alejandro Fernández
- Huaso Filomeno
- Nicole
- Emmanuel

=== Day 4 (Wednesday 25) ===
- Vicentico
- León Murillo
- Pedro Aznar
- Cultura Profética

=== Day 5 (Thursday 26) ===
- Romeo Santos
- Noche de Brujas

=== Day 6 (Friday 27) ===
- Yusuf Islam
- Arturo Ruiz-Tagle
- Nano Stern
- Oscar D'León

== Competition ==
=== Judges ===
- Pedro Aznar
- Nicole
- Nano Stern
- Ignacio Gutiérrez
- Isidora Urrejola
- Nayade Jara
- Alejandro Guarello
- Iván Núñez
- Maria Alejandra Requena
- Oscar D'León

=== Folklore competition ===
==== Participants ====
The finalists in the Folkloric Category at the Festival Viña del Mar 2015:

Country	Song	Interpreter	Song and Lyrics	Position
Argentina	"Cuyanito bien planta'o"	Ricardo Dimaría	Ricardo Dimaría	
Bolivia	"Morena"	Pasión Andina	Nelson Gutiérrez	
Brazil	"Forró no Canadá"	Marco Castillo	Marco Castillo	
Chile	"La mexicana"	Elizabeth Morris	Elizabeth Morris	1
Colombia	"Llegar a Nueva York"	Bendito Parche	TBD	
Peru	"Sonero de callejón"	Álex Ramírez and Costa Nuestra	Álex Ramírez	

=== International competition ===
==== Participants ====
The finalists in the International Category at the Festival Viña del Mar 2015:

Country	Song	Interpreter	Song and Lyrics	Position
Argentina	"Mejor que te perdí"	Laura Sky	Dany Tomas and Daniel Reschigna	
Canada	"Something beautiful"	Lori Nuic	Lori Nuic, Karen Kosowski and Jeff Dalziel	
Chile	"Boom chiqui boom"	Arturo Domínguez	Arturo Domínguez and Antony Albert	
Colombia	"Baila conmigo"	Julián Díaz		
United States	"Living your life for happiness"	Bobby Kimball	Bobby Kimball and Tommy Denander	
Italy	"Per fortuna"	Michele Cortese	Franco Simone	1

== Queen ==
- Jhendelyn Núñez, known for participating in Vedette shows

=== Applicants ===
- Jhendelyn Núñez, known for participating in Vedette shows, won
- Flavia Fucenecco, participated in reality show, 4th place
- Katherine Salosny, actress and recognized TV and radio show host, 2nd place
- Daniella Chávez, Playboy bunny, 3rd place
