= Gabriela Etcheverry =

Gabriela Etcheverry (born 1946) is a Chilean-Canadian writer, translator and literary critic who is also known for her role in Hispanic-Canadian cultural life.

== Biography ==
Etcheverry was born in a poor district of Coquimbo in Chile. She worked as a teacher in the capital Santiago where she married.

She arrived in Canada with little skill in either French or English. She however received her PhD in literature at Laval University, Quebec. She has two MA degrees (Comparative Literature and Spanish) from Carleton University, Ottawa. She taught courses in language, literature, culture and civilization at Carleton University and at other agencies in Ottawa, Canada, and currently works in translation and interpretation. She has published novels, short stories, poems, essays, reviews and reports.

As a literary critic, cultural promoter and co-director of the Red Cultural Hispánica (Hispanic Cultural Network) she has organized conferences on Hispano-Canadian authors (Jorge Etcheverry, 2007; Nela Rio, 2008) and hosted other literary events. Etcheverry runs a literary magazine and a children’s multilingual publishing house. She is on the board of a trilingual academic/literary publisher.

In 2008, Etcheverry won first prize in the "nuestra palabra" short story competition. Titled Nuestra palabra in Spanish, it was translated into English as Our Words. Her autobiographical novel Latitudes (2012) describes how while pregnant she moved to Canada to escape Pinochet's dictatorship. Some of its themes are continued in her more recent collection of short stories, The Breadfruit Tree (2013). Her literary work suggests the "ambivalent identity" and "double affiliation" of someone with strong ties to two different countries. Some of her work can be seen as "migration literature". For example, in her novella El Regreso there is a "metaphorical parallel between the return to the mother's house with the migratory return of an exile".

Etcheverry has spoken at various Canadian conferences relating to immigration, and created theatrical pieces about migration and about women's experiences of torture in Chile which have been presented in various different settings. The Department of Citizenship and Immigration invited her to visit schools to discuss experiences of migration with students, sharing poetry, stories etc., as part of a program called Passages to Canada.

== Works ==
=== Novels ===
- 2012. Latitudes. Ottawa. Qantati eBooks.
- 2008. De vuelta al pueblo/Coquimbo en tres tiempos (Back to town /Coquimbo in three times). Passages of the novella "El regreso (The Return)" and context. La Cita Trunca (Split Quotation), January 1.
- 2007.Latitudes [Latitudes] La Serena, Chile: Split Quotation.

=== Short stories ===
- 2013. L'arbre à pain et autres contes. Translated by Yvonne Klintborn. Toronto: Antares.
- 2013. The Breadfruit Tree and other stories. Toronto: Antares.
  - Review by Kevin Clinton, Festival of Images and Words, Dec. 9, 2013. Online.
- 2011. El árbol del pan y otros cuentos. Ottawa: Split Quotation.
- 2010 Añañuca. Illustrated by Jillian Lim. Ottawa: Qantati Junior, 2010. children’s book.
  - Review by Arturo Mendez Roca for EcoLatino (October 2010).
- Stories from the collection "El árbol del pan (Breadfruit)":
  - 2008 Josefina, Mundo en Español (World in Spanish), January.
  - 2007 Homero (Homer) Mundo en Español (World in Spanish), December.
  - 2007 El fotógrafo (Photographer) Mundo en Español (World in Spanish), November.
  - 2005 Oración por todos (Prayer for all)Alter Vox [Ottawa], November.
  - 2005 La Milonga Coquimbo Times, February.
  - 2005 Amador, La Cita Trunca (Split Quotation), July 29.
  - 2005 Ema. La Cita Trunca (Split Quotation), April 27.
- Stories from the collection "Tú y yo" (You and I):
  - 2008 "Tres mini (o micro) cuentos (Three mini (or micro) stories)", La Cita Trunca (Split Quotation),January:
    - Pareja (Couple)
    - Enamorada (In Love)
    - Pesadilla (Nightmare).

=== Poetry ===
- 2006 "Tres poemas urbanos (Three urban poems)", La Cita Trunca (Split Quotation), June 15:
  - Terry Fox
  - Primavera en Ottawa (Spring in Ottawa)
  - Toronto.
- 2005 Se te quedó en el tintero (It was like in the pipeline) La Cita Trunca (Split Quotation), Nov. 11th.
- 2005 El canto del cardinal (The song of the cardinal) La Cita Trunca (Split Quotation), May 20.
- 2005 La Muda (The mute) La Cita Trunca (Split Quotation), Nov. 21st.
- 2002 Once de septiembre del 2001 (September 11th, 2001). Alter Vox, January.
- 1989 Espantapájaros (Scarecrow). Reembou 1.

=== Literary criticism ===
- 2011. (Ed.) Nela Rio. Escritura en foco: la mirada oblicua.[Writing in focus. Oblique look.] Ottawa: Qantati, 2011. E-book.
- 2008. Claudio Duran, Childhood and Exile in Claudio Durán, La infancia y los exilios/ Childhood and Exile, of Claudio Durán (Ottawa: Split Quotation).
- 2007 " Influencia de la cultura de los años sesenta en la temática de la obra Vida (1968–82), de Gonzalo Millán [Influence of the culture of the sixties in the issue of work life (1968-1982), of Gonzalo Millán]. Boreal [Ottawa] (2007). Boreal Symposium (Ottawa, 2007)
- 2006 Preface to Tres lotos en un mar de fuego [Three lotuses in a sea of fire], Camila Reimers (Ottawa: Mapalé Arts and Letters).
- 2005 Review of MicroQuijotes. Selection and prolog of Juan Armando Epple (Barcelona: Thule Ediciones, 2005). La Cita Trunca (Split Quotation), Aug. 4th.
- 2005 Voces y silencio (Voices and silence). Note to the poem collection Una tierra extraña (A strange land) by Julio Torres-Recinos (Ottawa: Split Quotation, 2004). La Cita Trunca (Split Quotation), April 6th.
- 2003 Overview of the thematic evolution in the feminine Spanish-Canadian literature. Boreal Symposium (Ottawa).
- 2002 La cordura de las locas mujeres (The sanity of mad women) of Gabriela Mistral" Symposium in homage to Gabriela Mistral sponsored by the Autonomous University of Mexico in Hull, Canada.
- 2001 Review of Crisol del tiempo y Nosotros (Melting pot of time and Us), books of poems by Julio Torres. Alter Vox (summer).
- 1995 Chilean Poetry Is Alive and Well in Canada: Women’s Voices. Arc: Canada's National Poetry Magazine 35 (autumn). Article.
- 1994 Preface to El 39° fragmento del clan (The 39th fragment clan) of Nieves Fuenzalida (Ottawa: DPAPEL Editions).

=== Other ===
- 2007 Adiós Mariquita Linda o la metamorfosis de Pedro Lemebel (Good bye pretty ladybug or Peter’s Lemebel metamorphosis. La Cita Trunca (Split Quotation). June 26.
- 2007 Children of War y la masacre en el Instituto Politécnico de Virginia (Children of War and the slaughter at Virginia Polytechnic Institute). La Cita Trunca (Split Quotation), June 22.
- 2006 Día de los refugiados, día de vergüenza para la humanidad (Refugee Day, a day of shame for humanity) La Cita Trunca (Split Quotation), June 20.
- 2006. La píldora del día después (Morning-after pill). La Cita Trunca (Split Quotation), April 2.
- 2006 Irak tres años después (Iraq three years later). La Cita Trunca (Split Quotation), March 20.
- 2005 Las rotas chilenas (Broken Chilean). La Cita Trunca (Split Quotation), July 13.
