= Douglas Anthony Cooper =

Canadian writer

- Born: 1960 (age 65–66); Toronto, Ontario, Canada
- Occupations: Writer, novelist, journalist, photographer
- Writing career
- Genres: Fiction, journalism

Douglas Anthony Cooper is a Canadian novelist living in Rome. Cooper has published three novels and a children's book, as well as various magazine articles that feature his photography in addition to his writing. His second novel, Delirium, was a pioneer of online serialization.

== Personal life and influences ==
Douglas Cooper was born in Toronto in 1960.

Cooper has an M.A. in philosophy and completed a year of architecture school. His novels deal with architectural theory, and he has collaborated regularly with architects: notably on new media projects with Diller Scofidio + Renfro.

He studied Latin rhetoric, and was a serious competitive debater in college—he was Canadian National Champion in 1985, and Runner-Up Best Speaker at the 1985 World Championships. His first novel, Amnesia, discusses how myths about classical rhetoric form the basis for memory techniques.

== Books ==
Michiko Kakutani in The New York Times wrote that Cooper's "elliptical narrative style recalls works by D. M. Thomas, Paul Auster, Sam Shepard and Vladimir Nabokov."

Amnesia (1992), Cooper's first novel, was nominated for the Books in Canada First Novel Award, and longlisted for the Commonwealth Prize. It chronicles the unraveling of a Toronto family, and the amnesiac girl who ruins one of its children, Izzy Darlow. Publishers Weekly noted that it was "Published to extravagant praise in Canada (with comparisons to Nabokov, Genet, Calvino and Margaret Atwood)." Kirkus Reviews wrote that Amnesia was "more concerned with emotional states than traditional characters, and... reminiscent of, say, Thomas's White Hotel." Michiko Kakutani in The New York Times observed: "Although... (a) self-conscious quality never entirely lifts, one gradually comes to appreciate Mr. Cooper's copious gifts." James Polk, in a second The New York Times review, called Amnesia "a dense, absorbing first novel (which) locates prominent features in the landscapes of mind and memory." While the Chicago Tribune hailed the book as "intricate", the South Florida Sun-Sentinel dismissed it as "forgettable". The Boston Globe called Cooper "ambitious", and noted that he "takes us on a journey through the dark corridors of the psyche, introducing us to characters who change shape as easily as smoke rings."

Delirium (published in print in 1998) was "the first novel by an established author that was serialized on the Internet", in 1994. It was initially published digitally in 1994, by Time Warner Electronic Publishing (TWEP). Delirium is the second Izzy Darlow novel, and follows the character to Manhattan. Darlow finds himself caught up in the tale of Ariel Price, a legendary architect who has vowed to murder his own biographer. The experiment in architectural structure initiated by Amnesia becomes increasingly complex and monstrous, in line with the projects designed by Price. The New York Times observed that Cooper "invents an underground city of the dead and the disenfranchised that suggests the night visions in The Crying of Lot 49 (by Thomas Pynchon)." Cooper partnered with Peter Eisenman on an installation based on Delirium for the Architecture Triennial in Milan.

Milrose Munce and the Den of Professional Help (2007) is a gothic novel for young adults about a pair of flamboyant teenagers who can see and converse with dead students, and their war with the school psychologist who is set on convincing them that they cannot. It is a black comic look at the tactics of guidance counselors and juvenile psychiatrists. The novel became a surprise bestseller when it was accidentally published in Amazon Kindle format by Doubleday, and was subsequently deemed a "2008 Book of the Year" by the United Kingdom's Love Reading 4 Kids. It was on the Financial Times Bestseller List in London, England, after the paper observed: "Appealing to the misfit in all of us, Milrose Munce is a grand, gigglesome read."

First edition

Galunker (2014) is a children's novel, written by Cooper and illustrated by Dula Yavne, about Galunker, a misunderstood pitbull who seeks a home after a lifetime of dog fighting. Due to pitbulls' controversial reputation, the author and illustrator believed that no mainstream book publisher would want to risk an investment in publishing their book, so it was funded by raising more than $55,000 (double its original target of $27,500) on Kickstarter to get a publishing run. The book has been seen controversial as it has been accused on making pitbulls seem harmless; Barbara Kay is one such critic.

== Magazine articles ==
Cooper was a Contributing Editor at New York Magazine, where he both wrote and photographed the travel articles. His photography for New York Magazine was the subject of a feature in Photo District News. Cooper's writing and photography have appeared in The New York Times, Rolling Stone, Wired, and Food & Wine. He won a National Magazine Award in Canada for a travel essay in Saturday Night. A piece in Travel + Leisure won the Lowell Thomas Gold Medal from the Society of American Travel Writers Foundation in 2004, and was collected in The Best American Travel Writing 2004. In 2012, Cooper wrote a series of controversial articles for the Huffington Post, highly critical of PETA (People for the Ethical Treatment of Animals), and in support of the No Kill movement. This work, "PETA's Death Cult," was a finalist for the Canadian Online Publishing Awards, in the category of "Best Online-Only Article or Series of Articles."
