= Briarpatch =

Canadian news magazine (1973-)

- Cover of the 50th anniversary issue of Briarpatch (Jan/Feb 2023)
- Editor: Meera Eragoda
- Publisher: John Cameron
- Categories: Independent news magazine
- Frequency: Bi-monthly (every two months)
- Publisher: Briarpatch Incorporated
- Founded: 1971
- First issue: 1973
- Country: Canada
- Based in: Regina, Saskatchewan
- Language: English
- Website: briarpatchmagazine.com
- ISSN: 0703-8968
- OCLC: 1080281982

Briarpatch is an independent alternative news magazine based in Saskatchewan, Canada. The magazine reports on progressive causes and social movements, prioritizing the voices of people who are directly impacted, and those involved in organizing their communities.

Briarpatch is published six times a year, with print issues distributed across Canada and internationally.

Briarpatch is a member of Magazines Canada, and its staff are unionized with RWDSU Local 568.

== History ==
=== Beginnings ===
Briarpatch Magazine began as Notes from the Briar Patch, a newsletter established by the Unemployed Citizens Welfare Improvement Council (UCWIC), based in Saskatoon, Saskatchewan. Its founders were Maria Fischer, David Hoskings, and Vivian Fisher. In 1973, UCWIC was engaged in the lives of some 500 welfare recipients, through a co-operative buying club, a co-operative daycare, and advocacy work. It was also allied with several other grassroots organizations and service agencies, under the umbrella of the Saskatchewan Coalition of Anti-Poverty Organizations (SCAPO), giving rise to discussions about the need for a communications vehicle for the various agencies and their members. Although they had no budget, in August 1973 Fischer, Hoskings, and Fisher decided to press forward and create a newsletter.

The inaugural issue was produced on August 24, 1973 as a 10-page corner-stapled newsletter. It was a popular item at Saskatoon's annual Poor People's March, and supporters began to donate money and paper. The group continued to produce issues throughout the fall of 1973, distributing 500 copies monthly to Saskatoon's various service agencies. The first four editions, produced on an early photocopier owned by the Saskatoon Family Service Bureau, were expensive to produce and the thermofax paper quality was poor. As a result, no copies are known to survive today. However, the gamble of pushing ahead without a budget paid off; with a successful publication in hand, UCWIC was able to obtain a $2,500 federal grant from Canada's Human Resource Development Agency (HRDA) in November 1973. Thereafter, Notes from the Briar Patch was printed on a Gestetner machine at the Saskatoon Community Clinic at a cost of $300 a month. The improved printing techniques allowed circulation to expand to 2,000 copies by 1974.

=== Founding Editorial Stance ===
From the beginning, it was clear the publication intended to be more than an information sheet. Its very name represented a critical stance, being a playful pun on the last name of an unpopular local welfare officer named Brierley. The idea of media-empowered citizen engagement was explained in this 1977 description of the newsletter's founding ethos:

The purpose of the newsletter was to organize low income people in order that they might change a dehumanizing life situation. They felt that there was no vehicle through which they could be informed of decisions made on their behalf, in terms which they could understand. They also recognized the need for a communication system which would express their feelings about those decisions, and their general situation, something which the established media did not seem to be doing.

=== Independence ===
Despite the challenges of operating on shoe-string funding, within a year Notes from the Briar Patch had an impressive distribution network and a desire to become its own independent entity. At the same time, UCWIC was winding down. In 1974 the Briar Patch Society was incorporated, with a membership fee set at $1. At the society's first general meeting, held February 21–22, 1974, the members agreed to produce an independent newsletter that would: act as a communications link for low income people; provide educational workshops and media access; and "evaluate, analyze, and provide constructive criticism of government programs and dealings with low income people known to the public." A seven-member board was chosen to oversee operations of the magazine, named The Briar Patch, in honour of the original newsletter. The society created a distribution system by which organizations could buy bundles of magazines at bulk rates and sell individual copies for 25 cents each, gaining some income while spreading the magazine. For core funding, The Briar Patch turned to the Saskatchewan Coalition of Anti-Poverty Organizations (SCAPO), which provided $2,500 from its pool of federal funds. Added to this was $3,800 from the Protestant, Lutheran, Roman Catholic and Anglican Aid Committee (PLRA, later called PLURA with the addition of the United Church).

Although the grants were small, it was enough to keep the magazine above water until it received its first substantive funding, a $36,000 grant from the Saskatchewan Department of Social Services, in April 1975. With this funding, the magazine moved into a larger office, hired staff, and changed to a magazine format with a centre staple and glossy cover. Briarpatch moved its main office to Regina, the provincial capital in 1975, so that it could be closer to the provincial political scene. The magazine's increasing commitment to independent journalism raised debate among board and staff over whether anti-poverty groups should have direct control over content, leading to a split with SCAPO. Subsequently, The Briar Patch began to take on the look and feel of an independent alternative magazine. In 1976, the magazine expanded its mandate to include covering news of workers and Indigenous people, which led to increased coverage of labour, agriculture and Indigenous issues. As well, the board was expanded to include volunteers and contributors from throughout the province. On the Indigenous front, critical coverage of northern uranium development proved to be a popular topic. Activities of the women's movement, including early efforts to establish childcare programs and women's shelters, were also frequently reported on. Many articles were critical of the provincial government of the day, headed by the Saskatchewan New Democratic Party (NDP).

In January 1978, the non-profit society re-incorporated as Briarpatch, Inc., and changed the publication's title to a single word, Briarpatch. Board and staff sharpened the focus on independent journalism, joining the Canadian Periodical Publishers Association and attending the founding conference of the Canadian Investigative Journalism Association. In essence, Briarpatch's primary raison d'être was by now well grounded within common definitions of accountability journalism, i.e. carrying out investigations and holding establishment structures to account for policy decisions. As well, Briarpatch's alliances had expanded to other third sector media practitioners. In 1978 the magazine helped create a network of Regina journalists working for New Breed, Briarpatch, The North Central News, and University of Regina's student paper, The Carillon, for a combined circulation of 17,000. Called the Regina News Agency, the project lasted long enough to provide lively shared coverage of events during Trudeau's 1978 visit to Saskatchewan.

=== Loss of funding ===
In 1979, the NDP government abruptly cancelled Briarpatch's funding, which had risen to $54,000 a year and accounted for almost the entire operating budget of the magazine. In an official letter, the Minister of Social Services stated that Briarpatch did not fit provincial funding priorities or provide a direct service; however, many Briarpatch supporters felt the real reason was the magazine's vocal criticism of the province's embrace of uranium mining. This sentiment seemed to be backed up by an anonymous Social Services official, who stated in The Regina Leader-Post, "How can I go to cabinet and ask them to approve funding for a magazine that is critical of uranium development?"

Briarpatch's survival came down to a typesetting business it had established the previous year, and donor support. The typesetting business, First Impressions, proved to be a steady revenue source, and subscribers stepped forward generously with donations. Within two years, the magazine had fully replaced the lost grant funding with subscriptions, donations and revenue from First Impressions.

=== Political coverage ===
Following the 1982 election of a Conservative Party provincial government, Briarpatch played a strong role in investigating links between Conservative Party supporters and the financial spoils of privatization. In addition to its own reporting, the magazine carried as an insert the newsletter of the Social Justice Coalition, a grassroots citizens organization formed to oppose Grant Devine's government. While the magazine won several journalism awards during this time, it also attracted less favourable attention from right-wing opponents. In 1987, Revenue Canada followed up on a citizen's complaint and revoked Briarpatch's official charitable status, held since 1975, meaning the magazine could no longer issue tax receipts to donors. A lawyer worked on behalf of Briarpatch for free for the next eight years to appeal the decision, however case was finally lost in the Federal Court of Appeal. The loss of charitable status did not impact donations, however, and indeed may have served to increase donations during this time.

=== Transition to a national magazine ===
Over the years, Briarpatch's subscriber base expanded across Canada and internationally. In 2004, with the assistance of a Canada Magazine Fund grant, the magazine undertook a reader survey that revealed readers outside Saskatchewan had become the majority audience. In response, Briarpatch began actively recruiting freelance contributions from beyond Saskatchewan, and began filtering local stories through a national lens. Additional annual federal grants helped Briarpatch carry out national advertising campaigns, bolstering the transition to what today is a national magazine. Once again, the magazine became reliant on government funding to fill out its budget, and once again funding was abruptly cut in 2008-09, shortly after the election of a Conservative Party of Canada government under Stephen Harper - and once again, Briarpatch turned to its readers, launching a successful donor drive to make up for the shortfall.

The transition to a national magazine did not occur without some loss of local accountability journalism. Following the election of Brad Wall's Saskatchewan Party in 2007, several longtime Briarpatch supporters pointed to the need for a provincial investigative journalism undertaking, similar to the role Briarpatch had played during the Devine government years. Briarpatch responded by launching a sister publication, The Sasquatch, in March, 2009. However, The Sasquatch was unable to meet revenue targets, and Briarpatch - already stressed by the loss of federal funding - decided to cease publishing The Sasquatch after eight issues.

=== Briarpatch today ===
Briarpatch publishes six times a year from its Regina office, with print issues distributed across Canada and internationally.

In 2018, Briarpatch staff Saima Desai and David Gray-Donald revived a Saskatchewan-focused sister-publication, launching the Sask Dispatch.

In 2021, Briarpatch won the Issue Grand Prix at the Canadian National Magazine Awards for its September/October 2020 issue, which was entitled "The Land Back Issue," and which was co-edited by Nickita Longman, Emily Riddle, and Alex Wilson. That same year, the Alberta Magazine Publishers Association named Briarpatch the Saskatchewan Magazine of the Year, crediting its "sharp editorial edge," and stating that Briarpatch "has really come into its own with timely, important stories that are consistently well-told and well packaged."

Every October/November the magazine publishes a special issue dedicated to labour topics.

As of 2024, Briarpatch is led by Editor, Meera Eragoda, and Publisher, John Cameron.

== Editors ==
1. Maria Fischer 1973-1976
2. Editorial collective 1976-1978
3. Clare Powell 1979-1980
4. Marian Gilmour 1980-1983
5. Beth Smillie 1983-1987
6. Adriane Paavo 1987-1989
7. George Martin Manz 1990-2003
8. Debra Brin 2003-2005
9. David Oswald Mitchell 2005-2010
10. Shayna Stock and Val Zink 2010-2013
11. Andrew Loewen 2013-2015
12. Tanya Andrusieczko 2015-2018
13. Saima Desai 2018-2023
14. Sophie Jin 2023-2024
15. Meera Eragoda 2024-

== Issues ==
Briarpatch covers a variety of social justice issues like peace, equality, environment, democracy, racism, sexual orientation and class differences.

Maude Barlow once said that Briarpatch is "one of the few voices that will still challenge the corporate agenda and present workable alternatives."
