= Emily Austin (writer) =

Canadian writer

Emily Austin is a Canadian writer based in Ottawa, Ontario, whose debut novel Everyone in This Room Will Someday Be Dead was a shortlisted finalist for the 2022 Amazon.ca First Novel Award.

== Biography ==
=== Early life ===
Born and raised in St. Thomas, Ontario, she studied English literature, religious studies and library and information science at the University of Western Ontario.

=== Career ===
Everyone in This Room Will Someday Be Dead, her debut novel, was published in 2021. In addition to the Amazon.ca First Novel Award, the book was also longlisted for the 2022 Stephen Leacock Memorial Medal for Humour, and shortlisted for the 2022 Ottawa Book Award for English fiction.

In 2024, she published her second novel, Interesting Facts About Space, and the poetry collection Gay Girl Prayers. She released her third novel, We Could be Rats, in January 2025. Her fourth novel, Is This A Cry For Help?, released on January 13, 2026.

== Personal life ==
She identifies as queer.

== Bibliography ==
=== Novels ===
- 2017 : Oh Honey
- 2021 : Everyone in This Room Will Someday Be Dead, Simon & Schuster. ISBN 9781982167363.
- 2024 : Interesting Facts About Space
- 2025 : We Could Be Rats
- 2026 : Is This a Cry for Help?

=== Poetry ===
- 2024 : Gay Girl Prayers

=== Short Fiction ===
- 2025 : "Grand Beaver Cabin" published in the anthology Be Gay, Do Crime
