= Caroline Dawson (writer) =

Chilean-born Canadian writer (1979–2024)

Caroline Dawson (December 12, 1979 – May 19, 2024) was a Chilean-born Canadian writer, whose debut novel Là où je me terre was published in 2020.

== Biography ==
Born in Valparaíso, Chile, she was exiled to Montreal, Quebec, in 1986 with her family as refugees from the dictatorship of Augusto Pinochet. She was the sister of writer Nicholas Dawson.

Dawson studied sociology at the Université de Montréal, and then taught sociology courses at Cégep Édouard-Montpetit.

Dawson died of bone cancer on May 19, 2024, at the age of 44.

== Career ==
Là où je me terre, an autofiction about her own journey as an immigrant, was published in November 2020. The novel was defended by Michel Marc Bouchard in the 2021 edition of Le Combat des livres.

As the Andes Disappeared, an English translation by Anita Anand of Là où je me terre, was published in 2023 by Book*hug.

In 2023, she published the poetry collection Ce qui est tu, and in 2024, she published the children's book Partir de loin.

== Awards and honours ==
- Là où je me terre, winner of the Prix littéraire des collégiens in 2022.
- As the Andes Disappeared, shortlisted for the 2024 Amazon.ca First Novel Award.

== Legacy ==
In May 2024, just a few days before Dawson's death, the French division of the Canadian Broadcasting Corporation announced the creation of the Prix Caroline-Dawson, a literary award to honour works by emerging writers.
