= Tim Wynveen =

- Born: Canada
- Occupations: Novelist, guitarist
- Musical career
- Instrument: Guitar

Tim Wynveen is a Canadian novelist. His 1997 debut novel, Angel Falls, won the Commonwealth Writers Prize for Best First Book. He subsequently published Balloon in 1999 and Sweeter Life in 2003.

Raised in Leamington, Ontario, he moved to Toronto in the 1970s to play music, his first passion. He was the guitar player for a while with Edward Bear and later Chris De Burgh from Ireland.
