= James Gregor (writer) =

Canadian writer

James Gregor is a Canadian writer from Halifax, Nova Scotia, whose debut novel Going Dutch was a shortlisted finalist for the Amazon.ca First Novel Award in 2020. The novel, about a gay graduate student in New York City who becomes drawn into an emotionally complex quasi-relationship with a female fellow student despite their sexual incompatibility, was published in 2019, and based partially on his own experiences while studying creative writing at Columbia University in the early 2010s.

In addition to the Amazon.ca First Novel Award, Going Dutch was a finalist for the Margaret and John Savage First Book Award at the 2020 Atlantic Book Awards & Festival.

Gregor is the grandson of Hugh Francis Pullen, a Canadian military officer and historian whose books included The Shannon and the Chesapeake and The Sea Road to Halifax: Being an Account of the Lights and Buoys of Halifax Harbour.
