= Metatron Press =

Canadian independent book publisher

- Country of origin: Canada
- Headquarters location: Montreal, Quebec
- Official website: http://www.metatron.press

Metatron Press is an independent book publisher located in Montreal, Quebec, Canada. Metatron is "devoted to publishing new perspectives in literature that reflect the experiences and sensibilities of our time." Founded in 2013 by Ashley Opheim, who was later joined by Guillaume Morissette and Jay Ritchie. Metatron is currently edited by Ashley Opheim and a team of emerging editors.

== Publications ==
Since its conception in 2014, Metatron has published books, chapbooks, and held 50+ readings. According to CBC Arts, Metatron Press wants to "reflect a new generation's sensibilities" and has been "helping overlooked talent break into the literary world." According to Quill & Quire, Metatron is forging "a beautiful path for emerging poetry and fiction". Their books are "an archive of the contemporary concerns and sensibilities of the highly misunderstood millennial generation.”

== Awards ==
In Fall 2022, the half drowned (Metatron, 2022) won the Concordia University First Book Prize by the Quebec Writer's Federation. In 2021 Lee Suksi's debut novella The Nerves (Metatron, 2020) won the Lambda Literary Award for LGBTQ Erotica. In Fall 2021, knot body (Metatron, 2020) was shortlisted for the Concordia University First Book Prize by the Quebec Writer's Federation. In June 2020, ʔbédayine (Metatron, 2019) was shortlisted for the Best Prose Award by the Indigenous Voices Awards.

== ÄLPHÄ/ÖMËGÄ ==
Along with their physical publications, Metatron ran a literary blog called "ÖMËGÄ" (2014–2018) which was replaced by ÄLPHÄ, which encourages submissions from people of marginalized groups. ÄLPHÄ and ÖMËGÄ has published poetry and short stories from several of their authors as well as countless others.

== The Metatron Prize for Rising Authors & Past Winners ==
In 2015, Metatron created "The Metatron Prize for Rising Authors". The Metatron Prize helps pave the way for new and unique literary voices, placing the spotlight on rising talents in poetry and fiction.

The annual winning manuscript receives a publishing contract with Metatron Press, a cash prize and a selection of Metatron titles. In 2021, Jayson Keery won the Poetry category judged by Fariha Roísín, with Casey Bell winning the Fiction category judged by Marlowe Granados. In 2018, C.A. Conrad and Anne Boyer judged the prize and awarded Kaitlyn Purcell first place for her book.

Winners of The Metatron Prize include:

Jayson Keery's The Choice is Real (2021); Casey Bell's Little Fury (2021); Kaitlyn Purcell's ʔbédayine (2018); Jasper Avery's number one earth (2017); Sarah Jean Grimm's Soft Focus (2016); Sofia Banzhaf's Pony Castle (2015)

== Digital Poetry ==
Metatron publishes digital micropoetry on their Instagram account.
