= Amnesia (Cooper novel) =

1994 novel by Douglas Anthony Cooper

- First edition
- Author: Douglas Anthony Cooper
- Language: English
- Genre: Fiction
- Published: 1994
- Publisher: Hyperion Books

Amnesia is a 1994 novel by Douglas Anthony Cooper and is his debut novel. The book was published in March 1994 by Hyperion Books and is the first entry in the Izzy Darlow series.

== Synopsis ==
The book is dictated by an unknown narrator and follows Izzy Darlow, a mental hospital employee who volunteers his time in order to make amends for a robbery committed during his youth. It is there that he falls for the mute Katie, a patient at the hospital who had been subjected to extreme sexual abuse.

== Reception ==
Publishers Weekly noted that it was "Published to extravagant praise in Canada (with comparisons to Nabokov, Genet, Calvino and Margaret Atwood)." Kirkus Reviews wrote that Amnesia was "more concerned with emotional states than traditional characters, and... reminiscent of, say, Thomas's White Hotel. Michiko Kakutani in The New York Times observed: "Although (a) self-conscious quality never entirely lifts, one gradually comes to appreciate Mr. Cooper's copious gifts". James Polk, in a second New York Times review, called Amnesia "a dense, absorbing first novel (which) locates prominent features in the landscapes of mind and memory." While the Chicago Tribune hailed the book as "intricate", the South Florida Sun-Sentinel dismissed it as "forgettable". The Boston Globe called Cooper "ambitious", and noted that he "takes us on a journey through the dark corridors of the psyche, introducing us to characters who change shape as easily as smoke rings."
