= Tancook Island =

Tancook Island may refer to two different islands located in Mahone Bay in Lunenburg County, Nova Scotia, Canada:

- Big Tancook Island
- Little Tancook Island
