= Jack L. Gray =

Canadian artist

- Born: April 28, 1927; Halifax, Nova Scotia
- Died: 1981 (aged 53–54)
- Education: NSCAD University
- Known for: Painter

Jack Lorimer Gray (April 28, 1927 – September, 1981) was a Canadian artist, known particularly for marine art.

== Biography ==
=== Early life and education ===
Jack L. Gray was born in Halifax, Nova Scotia on April 28, 1927, the only child of civil engineer Samuel William Gray. Growing up in the South End of Halifax, he was a pupil at Tower Road School. As a schoolboy his talent for drawing pictures, especially those of ships at sea, was recognized and encouraged by Sir Edmund Wyly Grier. He was a student at the Nova Scotia College of Art and Design (NSCAD) during the tenure of Donald Cameron MacKay, ca. 1945. Gray was mentored by several painters, including Elizabeth Styring Nutt and David Whitzman. It was here that he met fellow artists Earl Bailly and Joseph Purcell. In the summer of 1945, Gray boarded with the Young family of East Ironbound island and made many sketches of island life which subsequently were turned into large paintings. After two years of studies at NSCAD, he left the school and went on sketching trips alone and with Purcell. During the summer of 1947 they rented the loft of a fish store at New Harbour, Nova Scotia and made many drawings and paintings. Gray traveled briefly to Montreal in 1948 to take a life drawing course from Arthur Lismer. Gray was observed sketching a boat hull in the class, and the instructor commented that, given that a future course might be offered in boat drawing, Gray likely would then be found drawing a nude. Jack's evident lack of interest in Lismer's classroom sessions soon led to private discussions between the two artists, which proved fruitful. In those years Gray also spent several seasons at sea with the last of Lunenburg, Nova Scotia's dory-fishing schooner fleet, and amassed a portfolio of sketches, notes and photographs.

=== Career ===
His first major solo exhibition was at Mr. Monty Allan's invitation, taking place in the dining hall of Allan's Hackmatack Inn, Chester, Nova Scotia in 1948, leading to several commissions. With subsequent patronage from the Philadelphia dowager heiress Mary Dayton Cavendish, Maritime brewery owner Sidney C. Oland and others in the Oland family, Gray gradually advanced his career, living aboard boats in the early 1950s. When the steamship Dufferin Bell was wrecked on the Nova Scotian coast in 1951, Gray traveled with the salvage crew and filled several sketchbooks, attracting the attention of the press. An early friendship with author Thomas Head Raddall led to Gray's pen-and-ink illustrations in Raddall's A Muster of Arms (1954); Gray also painted a wartime scene of Duncan's Cove, Nova Scotia for the book's dust jacket. While based in Chester in the summers from 1953 to 1955, he painted in (his landlord) Herman Walker's sail loft in the Back Harbour.

In the mid-1950s Gray moved to New York City, and initially painted in studios on boats in Flushing Bay. It was here that he first used the cantankerous flat-bottomed skiff he called the S.O.B. for waterborne sketching trips. For one of his sketches, Gray obtained permission from authorities in Brooklyn Navy Yard to use the deck of the rusting decommissioned aircraft carrier USS Enterprise (CV-6). His first New York showing was at the invitation of the Port Authority of New York and New Jersey in 1955. He was represented by Rudolf Wunderlich's Kennedy Galleries on 57th Street while living in the city, and briefly occupied one of the Des Artistes flats on the Upper West Side. A body of work from this period later became a well-known series of reproductions, the New York Harbor Collection. However, the collection was incomplete since many of the significant canvas works from that period were already sold. While in New York, Gray became acquainted with folksinger Ed McCurdy, and the two remained lifelong friends.

In 1958 an engagement with Samuel Bronston's Hollywood production company took Gray to Spain, where he worked on posters for the film John Paul Jones.

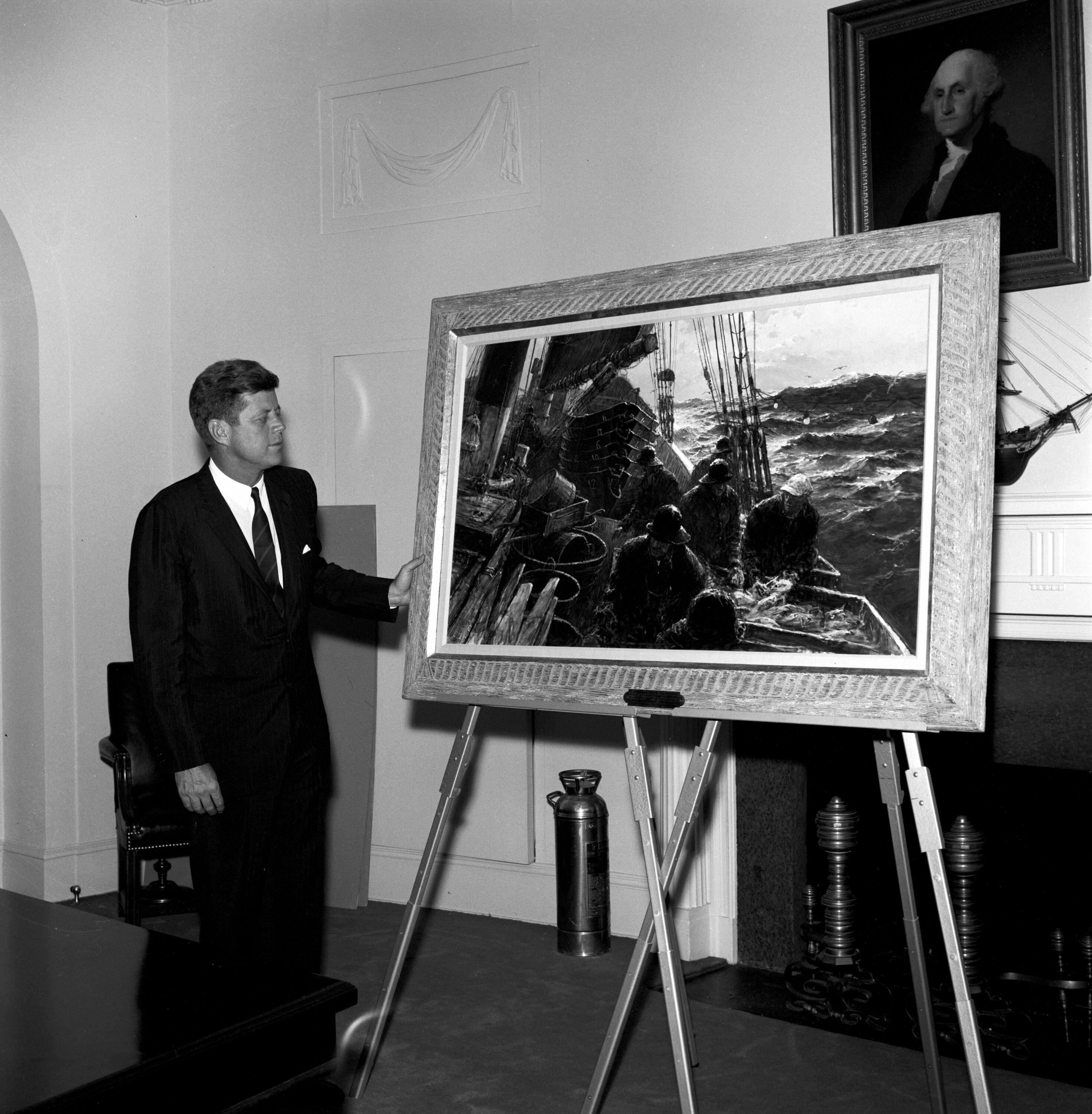
John F. Kennedy upon receiving a gift of Jack Gray's painting, Dressing Down the Gully

With encouragement from US district attorney (later Senator) E. Donald Finnegan, Gray moved in 1959 to Winterport, Maine, settling in an 18th-century Cape Cod on the banks of the Penobscot River. There he created a series of paintings, of which later critics, notably art expert Ian Muncaster of Halifax, would characterize as his best work. The Maine studio was short-lived, as Gray sold it in 1961 and moved to the Marlborough Woods area in the south end of Halifax, purchasing a property on the Northwest Arm, with a dock for his boat. Gray negotiated with New York publicity firm Peed & Gammon in 1961, who arranged for Gray's canvas Dressing Down, the Gully to find its way into the hands of newly elected US president John F. Kennedy. This resulted in a July 1962 visit to the White House in Washington by Gray, including a conversation with the President. Gammon and Peed had leaked information about the gift to the press, and upon publication of the White House visit news, bids from many patrons and galleries rapidly ensued. Gray remained friends with Roland Gammon for years afterward.

Gray moved back aboard a boat in 1965, in West Palm Beach, Florida, and strengthened relationships with galleries on Palm Beach's Worth Avenue that had begun in the spring of 1961 and would remain in place for the rest of his life. Concurrently, Gray maintained a summer hideaway in Stonehurst, Nova Scotia, where he continued to sketch his favorite subject, inshore fishermen in small boats. Gray befriended actor Gary Merrill in Palm Beach. The noted Hollywood photographer Phil Stern visited Gray's Nova Scotia studio in the early 1970s and amassed a huge archive of photographic images of Gray and his surroundings. This photo essay was originally earmarked to be part of a book on the artist's life and work, but the book was abandoned incomplete and never published.

In his adult years Gray was known as a witty raconteur and motorboat skipper, and in the latter part of his life often sailed across the Gulf Stream to the Bahamas. He was a frequent visitor to the Blue Bee Bar in New Plymouth, Green Turtle Cay and was a personal friend to (proprietor) Miss Emily Cooper.

Gray had many exhibitions in the 1970s throughout the world. Most unusual of these was the Spring 1978 retrospective exhibition in Halifax, held in the old powder magazine on Citadel Hill.

== Gray's reproductions ==
In the early 1960s, with help from the Oland family's business connections in Halifax, Gray's paintings Off Gunning Point and The Fisherman were released as poster-sized reproductions. With inferior inks and average quality paper, most examples of these are had deteriorated by 2015. In the 1970s Gray himself decided to take control of his reproductions, and was led to overseas high-quality printing professionals through his friendship with H. Dieter Holterbosch and Egon Hanfstaengl. An initial reproduction was done, a full-sized copy of East Ironbound, Winter, and the success of that led Gray to the more ambitious New York Harbor Collection, 380 sets of 12 images, with a bound set of miniatures in the style of an exhibition catalogue to be included with each set. These reproductions continue to pass from patrons to auction houses to galleries.

== Unauthorized reproductions ==
In the late 1970s, it became evident to Gray that the Dupont family, having acquired for themselves the original canvas set of the John Paul Jones canvas set from the Bronfman's following the 1958–1959 filming, had undertaken to issue a set of small reproductions, image size uniformly 28.5 x 19 .5 cm, of the paintings, under the corporate name Enterprise Promotions, Inc., "distributors for the Dupont Marine Heritage Collection". This series was done without the artist's knowledge and made no mention of Gray's name in the promotional materials. Gray voiced his disapproval when this was brought to his attention. The set of prints were advertised for sale in US newspapers in the fall of 1976 for $0.99 per print. Today, these small reproductions are a historical oddity and not found in any of Gray's surviving gallery network.

== Subject matter ==
A frequent foreground subject in many of Gray's paintings was a deep-keeled skiff-like Nova Scotia Bush Island boat, which the artist referred to as a "ram boat". Almost as frequently, one or more fishermen's dory boats appear in his work. Small Tancook Schooners and early Cape Islander designs also feature prominently. While a good many large sailing ships were depicted, many of the depictions of the bigger ships showed the view from the deck of one of these vessels, and these "deck scenes" form a significant sub-classification of his life's work.

== Technique ==
Most of Gray's fame came from his oil-on-canvas pieces. Although he painted on pre-made canvas-on board for some of his early works, he did hand-stretching of double-primed canvas for the majority of his output, particularly after 1959. All his oil works had an inscription on the back about the location of the scene depicted, often in considerable detail. Gray seldom dated his pieces, but used a code after his signature, for example: a dash plus three dots translating as 1958. His watercolor pieces diminished in number as his oil works gained notoriety, and today the surviving watercolors are rare collectibles. Gray painted his canvas pieces with oil colors mixed with turpentine. Despite the increasing availability of acrylic paints in the 1970s, Gray never used them.

Throughout much of Gray's life, he patronized family-oriented restaurants that made use of paper place-mats. On these he left drawings using either his sketching pens and pencils, when he had them on hand, or an ordinary ballpoint. The vast majority of these impromptu drawings were discarded by restaurant staff, but a few salient examples survive, notably in the hands of the management of Testa's of Palm Beach, Florida.

Less well-known was Gray's passion for boat design. One of his earliest (ca. 1950) floating studios was a Royal Canadian Navy harbor launch, which had been sold to fishermen post-war, and when Gray acquired this boat the Kathleen R. H. he made extensive modifications to the vessel. His floating studios were never new boats, and all had some of the artist's personally specified refits to some degree. Gray's most notable vessel was the Sea Gypsy, a 21-metre trawler. In the 1970s, Gray collaborated with a Canadian boatbuilding yard on the design of a custom yacht for a client.

=== Death and legacy ===
Gray was troubled with health issues during his last years. He died after a post-operative infection in Good Samaritan Hospital, West Palm Beach, on 4 September 1981. His ashes were scattered at sea, near the Tanner's Pass buoy (Near the entrance to Lunenburg Bay) from the decks of the fishing boat Doris IV, skippered by John H. Tanner.

The value of Gray's works rapidly increased after his death. Art dealers searched for his works by contacting people in Nova Scotia, Maine and Florida. Several forgeries appeared, and more than one work (including a high-profile canvas that was on prominent public display in Halifax) was reported stolen. The artist's early sketchbooks, originally kept in chronological order, were separated by a Halifax dealer in the 1960s, and sold as individually framed drawings.

With encouragement from both public museums and privately operated art galleries, a considerable revival of interest in Gray's life and work was seen to be underway after 2001. An increasing number of retrospective exhibitions were mounted, and his canvas works commanded ever-higher prices. In 2006, a piece titled "Man at Sea" was sold by Christies in New York for $91,200.
