= John Paul's Rock =

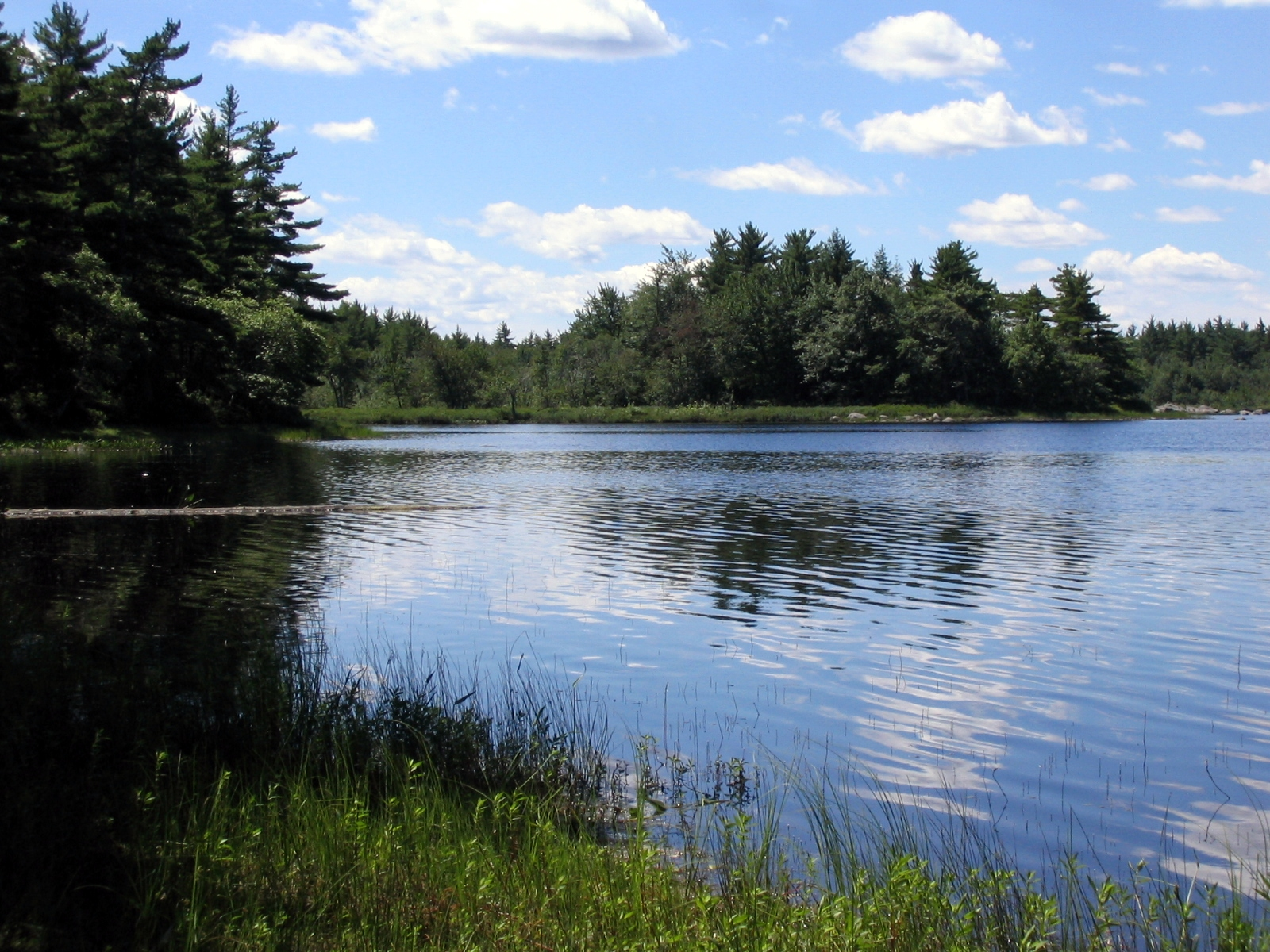
The point which today bears his name within the boundaries of Kejimkujik National Park which was the inspiration for the novel

John Paul's Rock is a novel published in 1932 by Canadian writer Frank Parker Day; it is about a Mi'kmaq guide who fled into Nova Scotia to escape white man's law.

== Overview ==
The novel was published by Minton, Balch and Company in 1932. It included illustrations by Day's wife, the artist Mabel Killam Day.

== Inspiration ==
Jim Charles, who was the inspiration for the novel, was perhaps the most noted Indian guide in both fact and fiction. His notoriety comes not from his guiding expertise but from his discovery of gold and a subsequent brush with the law which led to his fleeing as a fugitive into the wilds of the interior. In the 1860s, he was living in a cabin and tending a few heads of cattle and a horse on the point which today bears his name within the boundaries of Kejimkujik National Park.
