= Donna Morrissey =

Canadian author

- Born: January 13, 1956 (age 70) The Beaches, Newfoundland
- Occupation: Author
- Children: 2

Donna Morrissey (born January 13, 1956, The Beaches, Newfoundland) is a Canadian author.

At age 16, Morrissey left The Beaches. She lived in various places in Canada before returning to St. John's, where she studied at Memorial University and obtained a Bachelor of Social Work and a diploma in adult education. Morrissey now lives in Halifax, Nova Scotia.

Morrissey has written six national best sellers and prize-winning novels — Kit's Law, Downhill Chance, Sylvanus Now, What They Wanted, The Deception of Livvy Higgs, and The Fortunate Brother — as well as one Gemini-nominated screenplay. In 2021 she published a memoir, Pluck: A Memoir of a Newfoundland Childhood and the Raucous, Terrible, Amazing Journey to Becoming a Novelist.

Morrissey defended Frank Parker Day's novel Rockbound in Canada Reads 2005. Rockbound eventually won the competition. In the 2007 edition of Canada Reads, an "all-star" competition pitting the five winning advocates from previous years against each other, Morrissey returned to champion Anosh Irani's novel The Song of Kahunsha.

Morrissey had a double mastectomy due to breast cancer.

== Publications ==
- Kit's Law (1999)
- Downhill Chance (2002)
- Sylvanus Now (2005)
- What They Wanted (2008)
- The Deception of Livvy Higgs (2012)
- Cross Katie Cross (2012)
- What Beautiful Mistake Did You Make Today (2012)
- The Fortunate Brother (2016)
- Pluck: A Memoir of a Newfoundland Childhood and the Raucous, Terrible, Amazing Journey to Becoming a Novelist (2021)
- Rage the Night (2023)
- Tell It to the Water: Five Siblings Tell of Their Father's Grief and His Struggle Back to Hope (2026)

== Filmography ==
- Clothesline Patch (screenplay)

== Awards and recognition ==
For Sylvanus Now:

- Winner of the Thomas Head Raddall Award
- Atlantic Booksellers Choice Award
- Shortlisted for the Commonwealth Writers' Prize

For Downhill Chance:

- Winner of the Thomas Head Raddall Award

For Kit's Law:

- Winner of the Canadian Booksellers Association Libris Award
- Winner of the Winifred Holtby Memorial Prize
- Winner of the Alex Award
- Shortlisted for the Books in Canada First Novel Award
- Shortlisted for the Atlantic Provinces Booksellers' Choice Award
- Shortlisted for the Thomas Head Raddall Award

For Clothesline Patch:

- Winner, Best Production, 2002 Gemini Awards

For The Deception of Livvy Higgs:

- One Book Nova Scotia selection, 2016

For The Fortunate Brother:

- Winner of the Thomas Head Raddall Award
- Winner of Arthur Ellis Award for Best Crime Book of 2017
