= Mahone Bay =

Bay on the Atlantic coast of Nova Scotia, Canada

Coordinates: 44°30′N 64°13′W

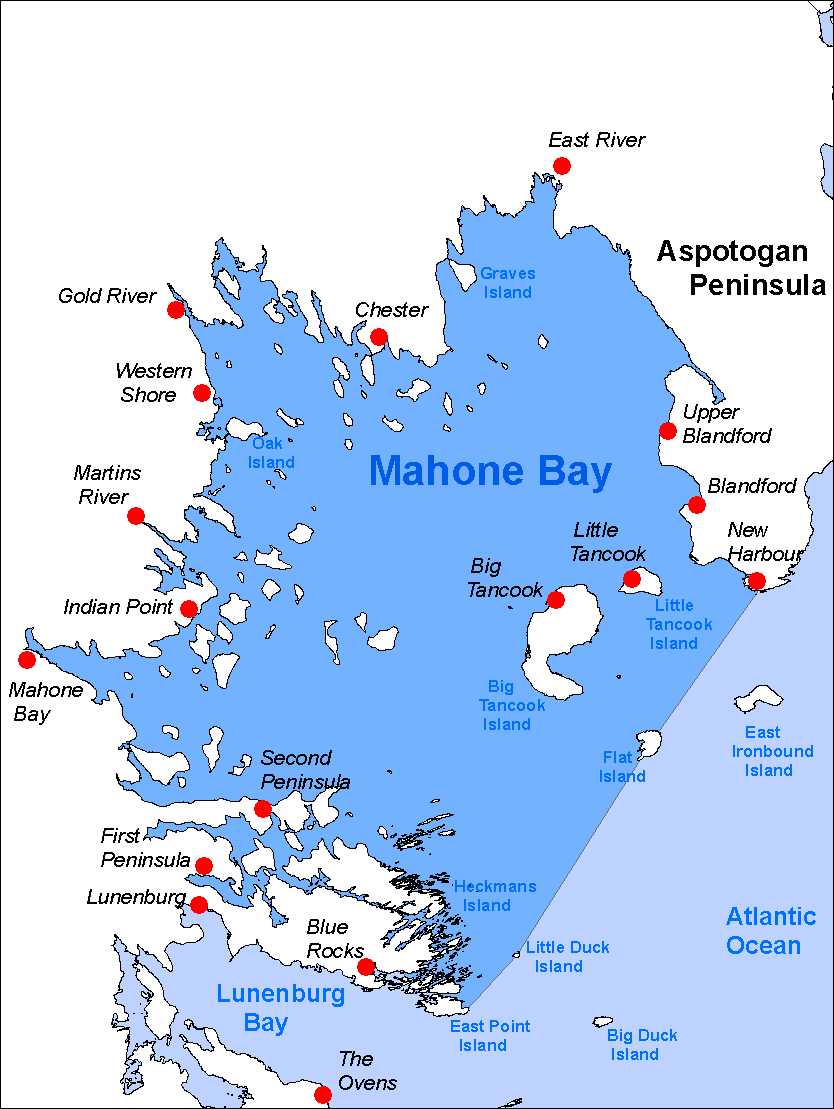
Map highlighting Mahone Bay.

Mahone Bay is a bay on the Atlantic coast of Nova Scotia, Canada along the eastern end of Lunenburg County. The bay has many islands (potentially 365), and is a popular sailing area. Since 2003 the Mahone Islands Conservation Association has been working to protect the natural environment of the bay. The bay and its islands contain a variety of habitats including forests, rocky shores, beaches, wetlands, and mudflats. Wildlife in the area include black guillemots, eagles, osprey, leach's storm petrels, puffins, razorbills, and great blue herons.

== History ==
HMS Hogue, which trapped the Young Teazer

The area was first inhabited by the indigenous Mi'kmaq. The first Europeans in the area were the French, the early maps of whom labelled the bay as La Baye de Toutes Iles (The Bay of Many Islands). The current name derives from the French mahonne, a type of barge.

In 1754 the British brought German speakers from Europe to colonize the area, starting in Lunenburg. German was the main language spoken in the area for many years, and today in the Bayview Cemetery, there are several gravestones dating from the late 1700s marked in German. Early settlers' names commemorated there include Zwicker, Eisenhauer, Heyson, and Kedy.

The site was the scene of hostilities during the French and Indian War and the War of 1812.

Economic activity in the mid-1800s, which included forestry, shipbuilding, shipping, and farming, led to the construction of churches and schools. In 1903 a rail link was established to Halifax. In 1919 the town was incorporated.

Today the principal economic driver is tourism.

== Geography ==
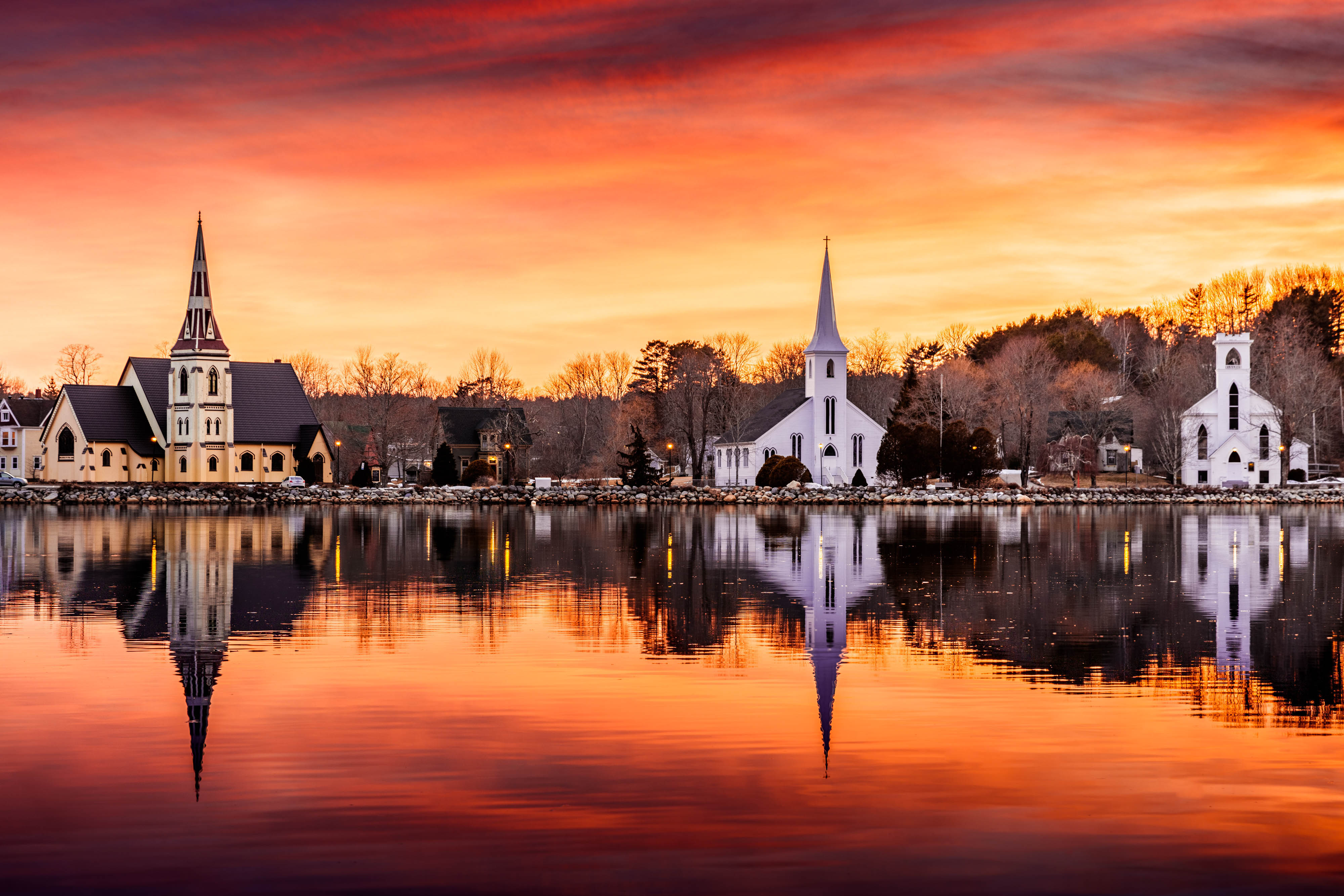
A view of the Three Churches across Mahone Bay

Opening south directly onto the Atlantic, its eastern shore is formed by the Aspotogan Peninsula and its western shore is formed by the First Peninsula (of Lunenburg). The Chester Peninsula juts several kilometres into Mahone Bay at roughly its midpoint.

The bay's geological history differs from its eastern neighbour, St. Margarets Bay, in that Mahone Bay shows a greater variety of soils and bedrock. Numerous glacial drumlins on the western shore near the towns of Mahone Bay and Lunenburg have produced soil conditions suitable for small-scale farming operations.

Mahone Bay also differs from St. Margarets Bay in that it is dotted with innumerable small and medium-sized islands throughout its waters. The shelter provided by these islands, along with the summer southwesterly flow, led to the scenery around Mahone Bay becoming a tourist attraction in itself. Today the towns of Chester and Mahone Bay have become a destination for cruising in pleasure yachts. A scenic provincial park at Graves Island just east of Chester is a popular camping destination.

Mahone Bay is home to numerous picturesque working fishing communities, one of the most famous being the communities of Big Tancook and Little Tancook, on Big Tancook Island and Little Tancook Island respectively. Other important fishing ports include Blandford.

== In popular culture ==
Frank Parker Day's novel Rockbound takes place on the fictional island of the same name, which was based on the nearby island of East Ironbound and includes references to many other Mahone Bay islands and towns. Day visited the area and created Rockbound as a fictionalized, exaggerated account of life on the islands.

Mahone Bay contains Oak Island, well known in connection with tales of buried treasure.
