= Whaleboat =

Vessel for hunting whales

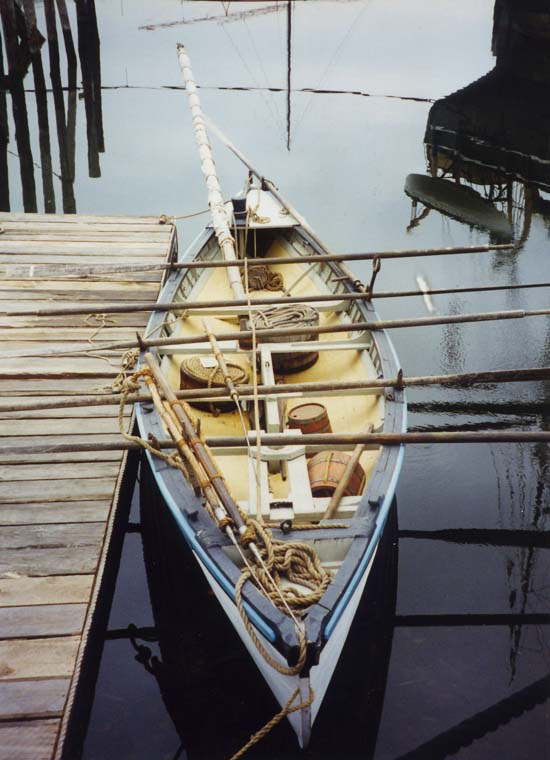
A modern copy of a whaleboat at Mystic Seaport. The mast is stowed with its heel under the after thwart and resting on the gunwale on the starboard quarter. The 2 tubs containing the whale rope are in the after half of the boat, and the rope is led round the loggerhead and then forward to the bow, between the chocks. The harpoons are already attached to the rope.

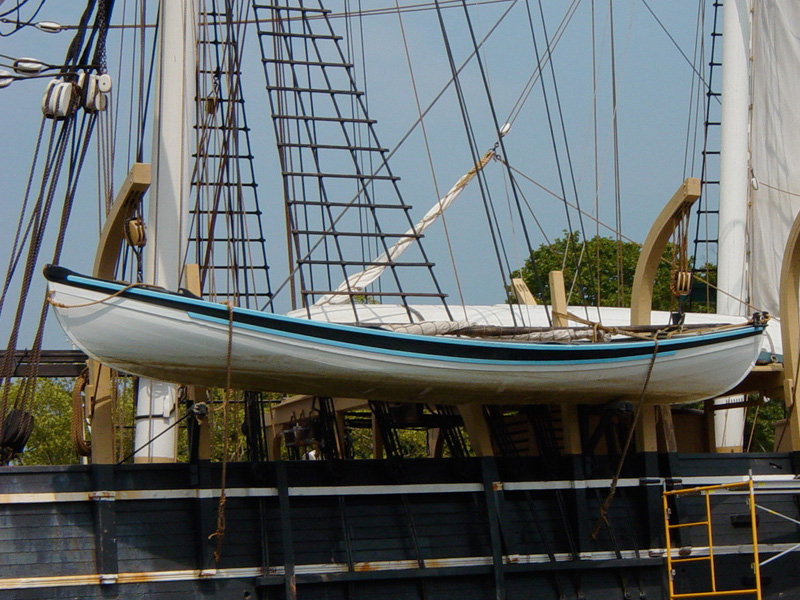
Whaleboat aboard the whaling ship Charles W. Morgan at Mystic Seaport

A whaleboat is a type of open boat that was used for catching whales, or a boat of similar design that retained the name when used for a different purpose. Some whaleboats were used from whaling ships. Other whaleboats would operate from the shore. Later whaleboats usually could operate under sail or oar - American whaling crews in particular obtained better results by making their first approach to a whale under sail, then quickly unstepping the mast and using oars thereafter.

Most whaleboats have double-ended (Note: A "double-ended" hull is one that is pointed in the same or similar way at each end. Many whaleboats were built with the bow and stern built from exactly the same moulds.), clinker-built hulls of light construction. The hulls were narrow and with sharp ends to achieve the best possible speed for the length of waterline. Length was between 27 and 31 feet. Beam was just over a fifth of the length. Typically they were propelled by five oars when rowed, and stepped a single removable mast when under sail. A rudder was used when under sail and a steering oar when the boat was rowed. The latter provided the manoeuvrability needed when closing with a harpooned whale.

Outside of whaling, whaleboats were well thought of for their seaworthiness and as a useful compromise between optimisation for sail or oar. They were therefore used as a type of ship's boat and for other utility purposes. Many of these derivative types varied from the whale-hunting types to some extent - for instance the Montagu whaler was a somewhat sturdier version with slightly fuller lines, but still retaining, for example, the five oars, clinker build, double ends and a reputation for seaworthiness.

== History ==
The early history of whaleboats includes a c. 1335 image of Basque whalers working from a double-ended boat of this type. The similarity of the whaleboat to the Shetland sixern has been commented on - suggesting a Norse design heritage. An early 1600s description of whale-hunting from a whaleboat follows closely the methods of New Bedford whalers in the 1870s. There is little information on the actual boats used in the 1600s, but with a whaleship of that time carrying half a dozen or more whaleboats, they are likely to have been specialised types. Illustrations from 1711 and the 1720s show double-ended whaleboats with a crew of six, single-banked oars and a steering oar. The bollards (loggerheads in American terminology) on which the whale-rope would be controlled are clearly depicted. There is no evidence of sails being used in on whale-boats before 1825, but this soon became the preferred technique of approaching a whale prior to harpooning. (The crew would rapidly unstep the mast as the harpooned whale moved off, towing the boat behind.) Boats became more optimised for sailing, with slightly more beam and less slack bilges in the section (to give greater stability); by the 1850s centreboards were common. The last whaleships to carry whaleboats worked under oar and sail operated in the 1920s.

== Modern applications and derivative designs ==
Today whaleboats are used as safety vessels aboard some marine vessels. The United States Coast Guard has used them since 1791 and stopped using them some time in the 1900s for motorized lifeboats. Their simple open structure allows for easy access and personnel loading in the event of an emergency. Some USCG whaleboats were used as lifeboats, with standardized equipment such as a hatchet, compass, sea anchor, emergency signal mirror, drinking water, first aid kit, jack knife with can opener, bilge pump, and other emergency provisions.

On modern warships, a relatively light and seaworthy double-ender for transport of ship's crew may be referred to as a whaleboat or whaler. Many have fuller hulls with more capacity, but far more drag.

Monomoy surfboats, a lifeboat directly descended from whaleboats, are used for recreational and competitive rowing in the San Francisco Bay Area and coastal Massachusetts.

The Tancook Schooner descends from whaleboats through the tancook whaler, a double-ended design optimized for sail.

== Uses in war ==
Whaleboats were also extensively used in warfare. Colonel Benjamin Church is credited with pioneering their use for amphibious operations against Abenaki and Mi'kmaq tribes in what is today Maine and Acadia. His troops, New England colonial forces and Native allies from southern New England, used them as early as 1696 (during King William's War). Others in the Northeastern borderlands followed suit and they were used throughout the imperial conflicts of the early 18th century, and extensively used by both British and colonial troops during the French and Indian War. Units that made extensive use of whaleboats were the 7th Massachusetts Infantry Regiment at the siege of Louisburg in 1745, often referred to as "the whaleboat regiment", and Gorham's Rangers, formed in 1744, initially a company of Indians mainly from Cape Cod, many of whom were employed as whalers, and which later evolved into a British Army ranger company in the 1750s and 1760s. John Bradstreet's Bateaux and Transport service, a corps of armed boatmen tasked with moving supplies on inland waterways during the French and Indian War also used whaleboats extensively. In 1772, American colonials used whaleboats to attack and destroy the Gaspee in Narragansett Bay. During the American Revolutionary War, there were many whaleboat raids, including one with 230 men led by Return J. Meigs Sr. to sack Sag Harbor on Long Island in 1777. On December 7, 1782, two fleets of whaleboats fought a bloody battle on Long Island Sound known as the Boats Fight. During the desperate hand-to-hand conflict, every man involved was either killed or injured.

== Construction and use ==
The whaleboat was originally a lapstrake design, clearly in the Northern European building tradition that created the longship and the yole. Its "superior handling characteristics soon made it a popular general-purpose ship's boat". In the first half of the 20th century, many navies carried whaleboats on their warships, such as the 27ft whalers used in the Royal Navy.

Whaleboats were equipped with a mast, which was stepped immediately after launching. The preferred whale-hunting technique was to approach a target whale under sail, as this was less likely to startle the animal than under oars. In light winds, paddles were used as these created less noise than oars. Boats used strictly for whaling often used only a long steering oar, while those used as ship's boats often had dismountable pintle-and-gudgeon rudders as well. A main sail, and occasionally a jib were used. After 1850 most were fitted with a centreboard.

== See also ==
- Pequod
- Whaler (a ship used for whaling, often carrying whaleboats)
- Whaling
- Montagu whaler 27 by 6 feet (8.2 m × 1.8 m) the standard seaboat of the Royal Navy (1910–1970)
- RHIB (a boat detached to major naval units with the same function of a whaleboat)
- Paledang
