= Tancook schooner =

Sailing work boat

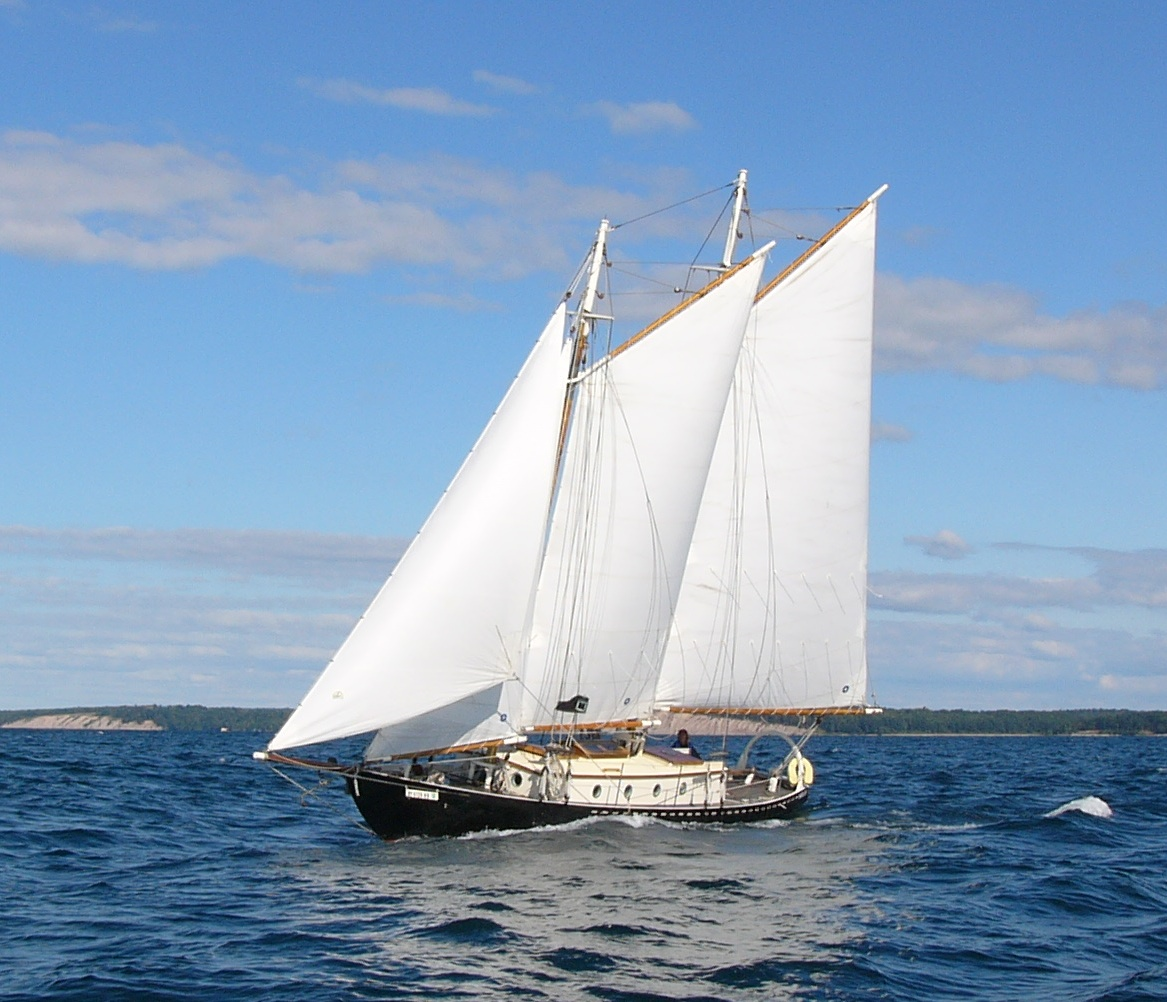
Ray Stevens design Tancook schooner yacht

A Tancook schooner is a sailing work boat design credited with influencing North American yacht designers and pleasure craft users during the early to mid twentieth century.

== Design and construction ==
The Tancook schooner, with its counter stern and characteristic round, or "spoon", bow was a distinctive type of small sailing work boat built primarily on Big Tancook Island, Nova Scotia, and the immediate surrounding area on and near Mahone Bay. The design succeeded the earlier double-ended Tancook whaler fishing boats. The Tancook schooners were usually larger than the Tancook whalers and had fixed keels rather than centreboards. The sail plan for the smaller sizes of transom-sterned schooners was typically gaff-rigged fore and main and one or sometimes two headsails. After about 1930, Marconi main sail rigs were common and a number of the smaller schooners were rigged as knockabouts flying a single jib without a bowsprit keeping the head sail rigging on deck.

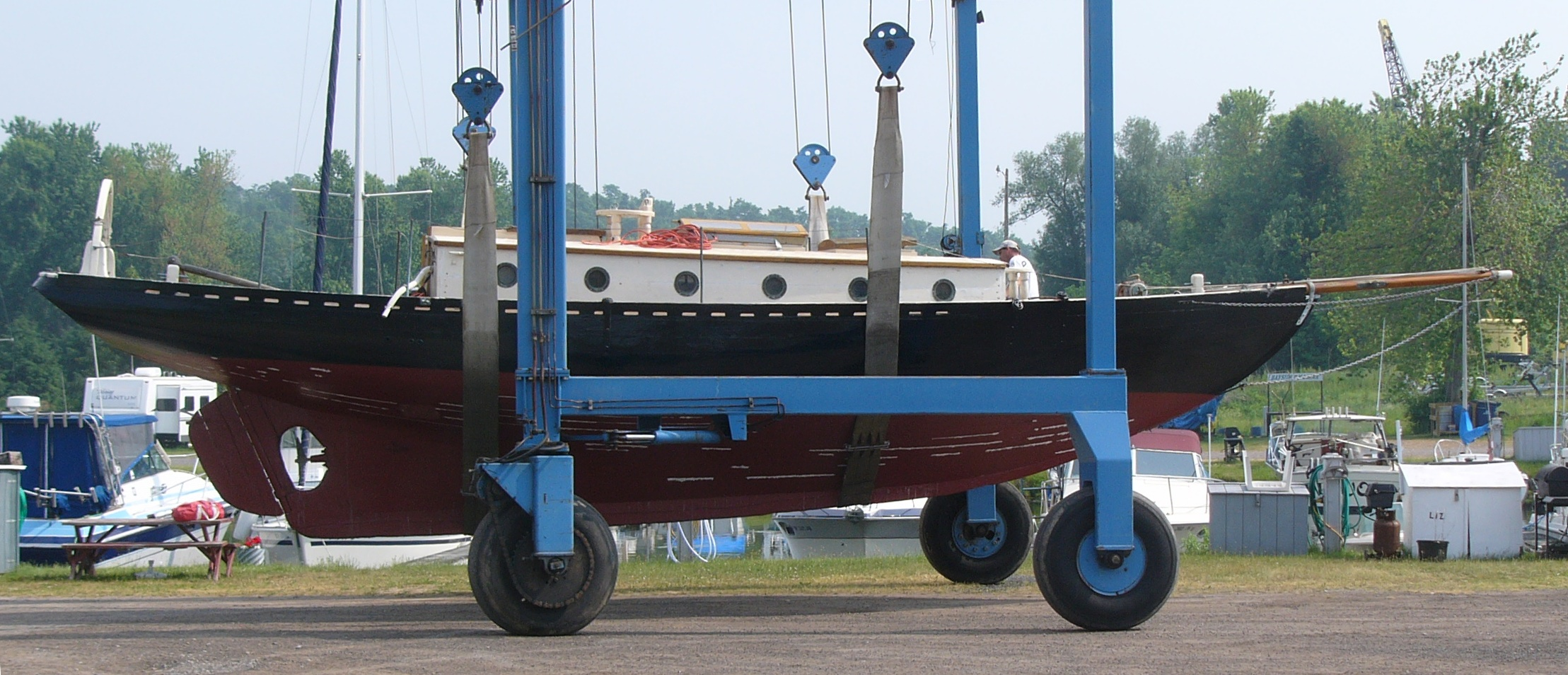
Ray Stevens design Tancook schooner yacht profile

== History ==
It has been claimed that Amos Stevens produced Tancook's first counter stern schooner the Black Nance, a 38-footer, around 1903. Within a few years the characteristic "spoon bow", with its greater buoyancy and fullness compared to the so-called Aberdeen or clipper bow of the Tancook whaler, was standard among the island's four boat building families who collectively produced most of these distinctive schooners for fishing and small scale coastal freighting.

Before 1925 the canvas material for the sails was often laid out and cut on the ice of a sheltered area. The firm of Mason and Langille used Southeast Cove Pond. The individual panels of cloth were then taken to Lunenburg along with a sail plan drawing for sewing in lofts there. After 1910 nearly all the schooners were also equipped with auxiliary gas engines.

Tancook schooners as large as 60 or 70 feet sailed offshore to distant fishing grounds as the larger salt bankers did or worked as coastal freight carriers, but many more were built in the 35 to 50 foot range and worked closer to home staying out for shorter periods. Four boat building families, the Stevens, Heislers, Masons, and Langilles were responsible for the majority of the schooners built between 1900 and 1945. Line fishing for various ground fish species and cod and drift net fishing for mackerel and herring were the main fisheries that the schooners were employed in. One of the last trades the island schooners engaged in during the 1930s was transporting winter cabbage and barrels of sauerkraut to the mainland.

Many Tancook boats were built for yachtsmen of the Chester region. Mahone Bay was a popular yachting area and the schooners made good cruisers when outfitted for pleasure sailing. Working boats were also bought and converted for yachting. The Airlie of the Nova Scotia Schooner Association is one surviving example of a working schooner converted to pleasure.

The advent of surfaced roads and trucking finished off the last coastal freight trade for the Tancook boats. The schooners were quickly phased out in favor of the gasoline powered "Cape Island" boat after 1940. However, Tancook schooners continued to be built for yachtsmen. Two 38-footers designed by David Westergard incorporate some elements of Tancook builders' designs and were under construction at the Dory shop in Lunenburg in 2010.

== Famous Tancook schooner yachts ==
Two schooner yachts built by Tancook Islanders that gained widespread recognition among the pleasure boating press and yachtsmen alike were the Vernon Langille-designed Cimba, whose long offshore voyage to the south seas was described by owner Richard Maury, and the Mason-built Blue Lagoon sailed in the 1940s by famed one time rum runner Bill McCoy.
