= The Song of Kahunsha =

2006 novel by Anosh Irani

- Author: Anosh Irani
- Publisher: Doubleday Canada
- Publication date: March 14, 2006
- ISBN: 0-385-66228-9

The Song of Kahunsha is a novel by the Indian-Canadian novelist and playwright Anosh Irani, published in 2006 by Doubleday Canada and in 2007 in the US by Milkweed Editions.

Set against the backdrop of the racial violence that engulfed the Indian city of Bombay in 1992 and 1993, the novel depicts the life of Chamdi, a ten-year-old orphan forced to survive on the streets after running away from his orphanage in a quest to find his father.

The book was selected for inclusion in the 2008 edition of Canada Reads, in which it was championed by author Donna Morrissey.

== Synopsis ==
Abandoned as an infant, ten-year-old Chamdi has spent his entire life in a Bombay orphanage. There he has learned to find solace in his everyday surroundings: the smell of the first rains, the vibrant pinks and reds of the bougainvilleas that blossom in the courtyard, the life-size statue of Jesus, the "beautiful giant," to whom he confides his hopes and fears in the prayer room. Though he rarely ventures outside the orphanage, he entertains an idyllic fantasy of what the city is like – a paradise he calls Kahunsha, "the city of no sadness," where children play cricket in the streets and where people will become one with all the colours known to man.

Chamdi's quiet life takes a sudden turn, however, when he learns that the orphanage will be shut down by land developers. He decides that he must run away in search of his long-lost father, taking nothing with him but the blood-stained white cloth he was left in as a baby.

Outside the walls of the orphanage, Chamdi quickly discovers that Bombay is nothing like Kahunsha. The streets are filthy and devoid of colour, and no one shows him an ounce of kindness. Just as he's about to faint from hunasoned street children offer help: the lovely, sarcastic Guddi and her brother, the charming, scarred, and crippled Sumdi. After their father was crushed by a car before their eyes, the children were left to care for their insane mother and their infant brother. They soon initiate Chamdi into the brutal life of the city's homeless, begging all day and handing over most of his earnings to Anand Bhai, a vicious underworld don who will happily mutilate or kill whoever dares to defy him.

Determined to escape the desperation, filth, and violence of their lives, Guddi and Sumdi recruit Chamdi into their plot to steal from a temple. But when the robbery goes terribly awry, Chamdi finds himself in an even worse situation. The city has erupted in Hindu-Muslim violence and, held in Anand Bhai's fierce grip, Chamdi is presented with a choice that threatens to rob him of his innocence forever.
