= St. Patrick's Church (Halifax, Nova Scotia) =

Heritage Church in Halifax, NS

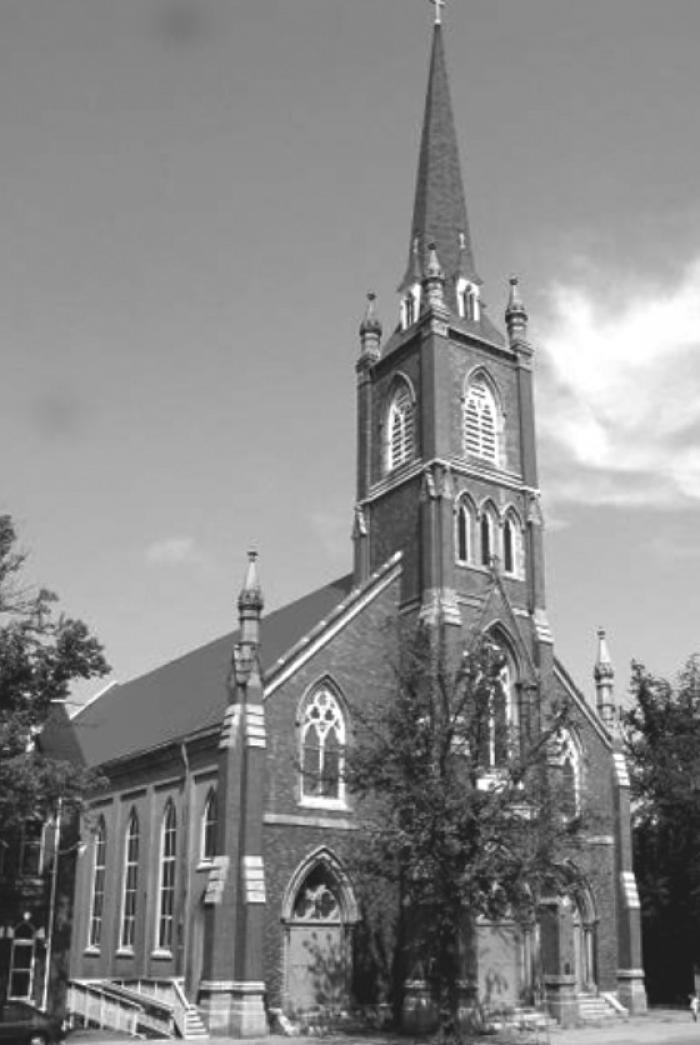
- Historic St. Patrick's Church
- St. Patrick's Church
- 44.654085°N 63.583119°W
- Location: 2263 Brunswick Street; Halifax, Nova Scotia; B3K 2Y9
- Country: Canada
- Denomination: Roman Catholic

History
- Status: Active
- Founded: 1843
- Dedication: Saint Patrick

Architecture
- Functional status: Parish church
- Architect: Henry Peters
- Style: Gothic Revival
- Groundbreaking: August 8, 1883
- Completed: December 27, 1885

Administration
- Archdiocese: Archdiocese of Halifax-Yarmouth
- Deanery: Halifax Central

St. Patrick's Church is an historic Roman Catholic parish church on Brunswick Street in Halifax, Nova Scotia. The parish was founded in 1843 and the Gothic brick and granite church was opened in 1885. It is registered as a Provincial Heritage Building (2010), a Halifax Regional Municipality Registered Heritage Property (1989) and has been listed by Canada's Historic Places since 2008. St. Patrick’s Church is also listed at the National Trust for Canada in their Top 10 Endangered Places List: 2008. It was served by the Society of Jesus.

The church has the oldest Casavant organ still in use in Canada. It is the only three-manual instrument built with pneumatic action that is still in its original condition in Canada today.

== History ==
=== Irish Settlers ===
Irish settlers first came to Nova Scotia in 1749. They were mostly from southeastern Ireland. Halifax was the preferred place of their settlement. Although they were not well-off, they regularly invested money to support the building of St. Mary's Basilica and St. Patrick's Church in Halifax.

=== Early history of the Parish ===
In 1843, the parish of St. Patrick's was founded. The name Saint Patrick's originated from the Irish community who attended services in a stable at the southwest corner of Gerrish and Gottingen Streets. Two years later, in 1845, the parish moved to a chapel that was previously used as the Anglican Garrison Chapel. The chapel was enlarged in 1851 with a tower and spire to which a bell was also added.

=== The Building of St. Patrick's Church ===
With the congregation growing in numbers, plans were drawn up to build a larger church so that it would have a greater capacity. A local architect, Henry Peters, was chosen to design the new church. He had designed St. Matthew's Church in the same city. Peters, who is buried in Holy Cross Cemetery, was a well known local builder. He also built the South Street Poor House, an Irish Catholic Institution in the Victoria Era.

The last Mass in the old church was held on 2 April 1883. On 8 August 1883, the Archbishop of Halifax, Cornelius O'Brien, laid the cornerstone of the new church. The first Mass in the new church was held in the basement on 22 December 1883. The completed church was opened to the congregation on 27 December 1885 and parishioners attended the Mass at the old altar in the upper part of the church.

=== Additions ===
From 1898 to 1903, stained glass windows were installed in the church. All but five of the original panels were destroyed by the Halifax explosion on December 6, 1917. In 1922, the Bavarian Art Establishment of Franz Mayer of Munich and New York replaced all the windows and did other repairs to the church.

The 1944 census estimated that there were 5600 parishioners in the area. In 1946, work was carried out to repaint and maintain the church.

In 1953, Joseph Purcell, the well-known artist from Lunenburg, Nova Scotia, was commissioned to paint the murals above and behind the altar. His own marriage took place in this church.

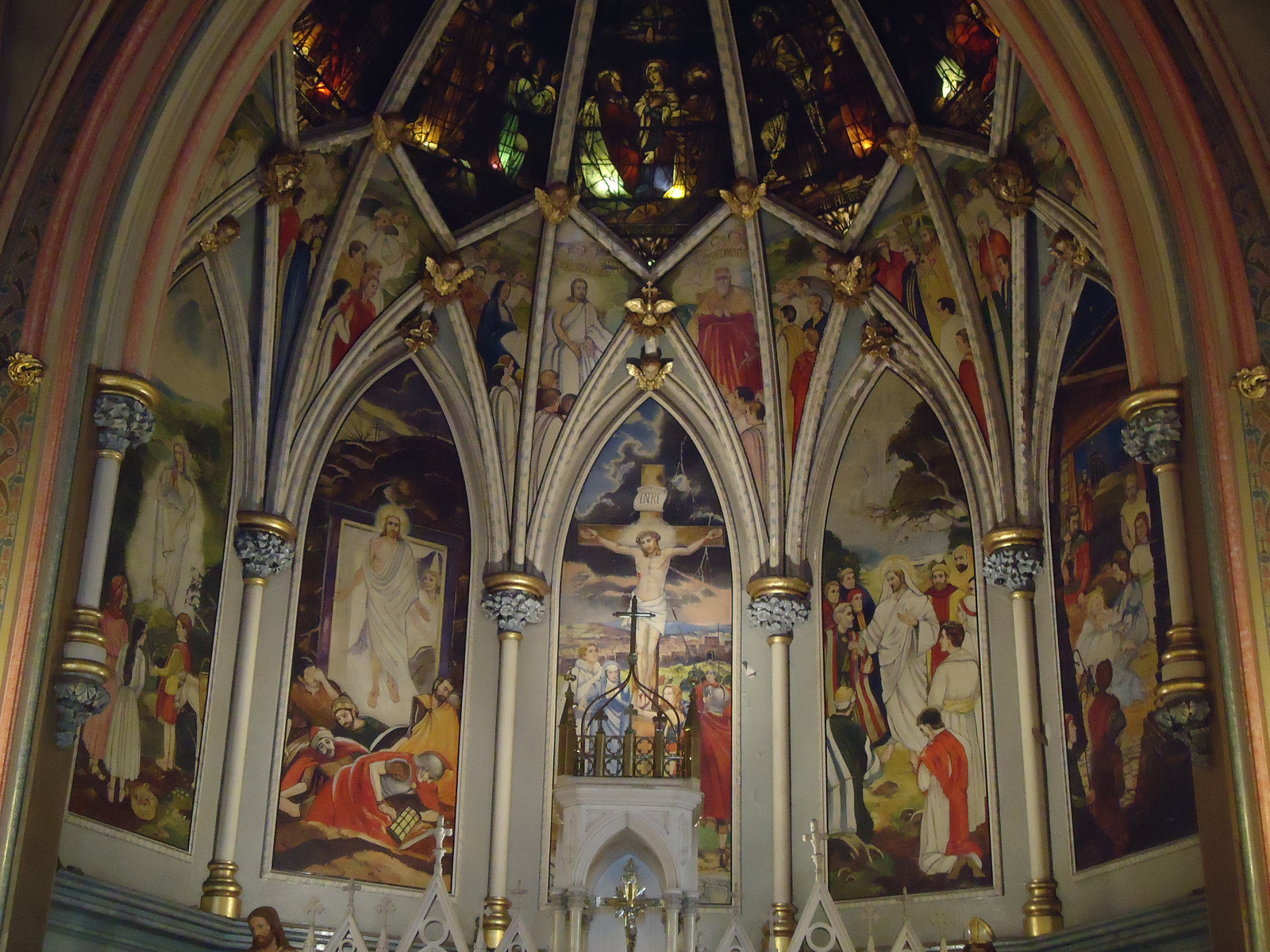
Murals by Joseph Purcell, 1953

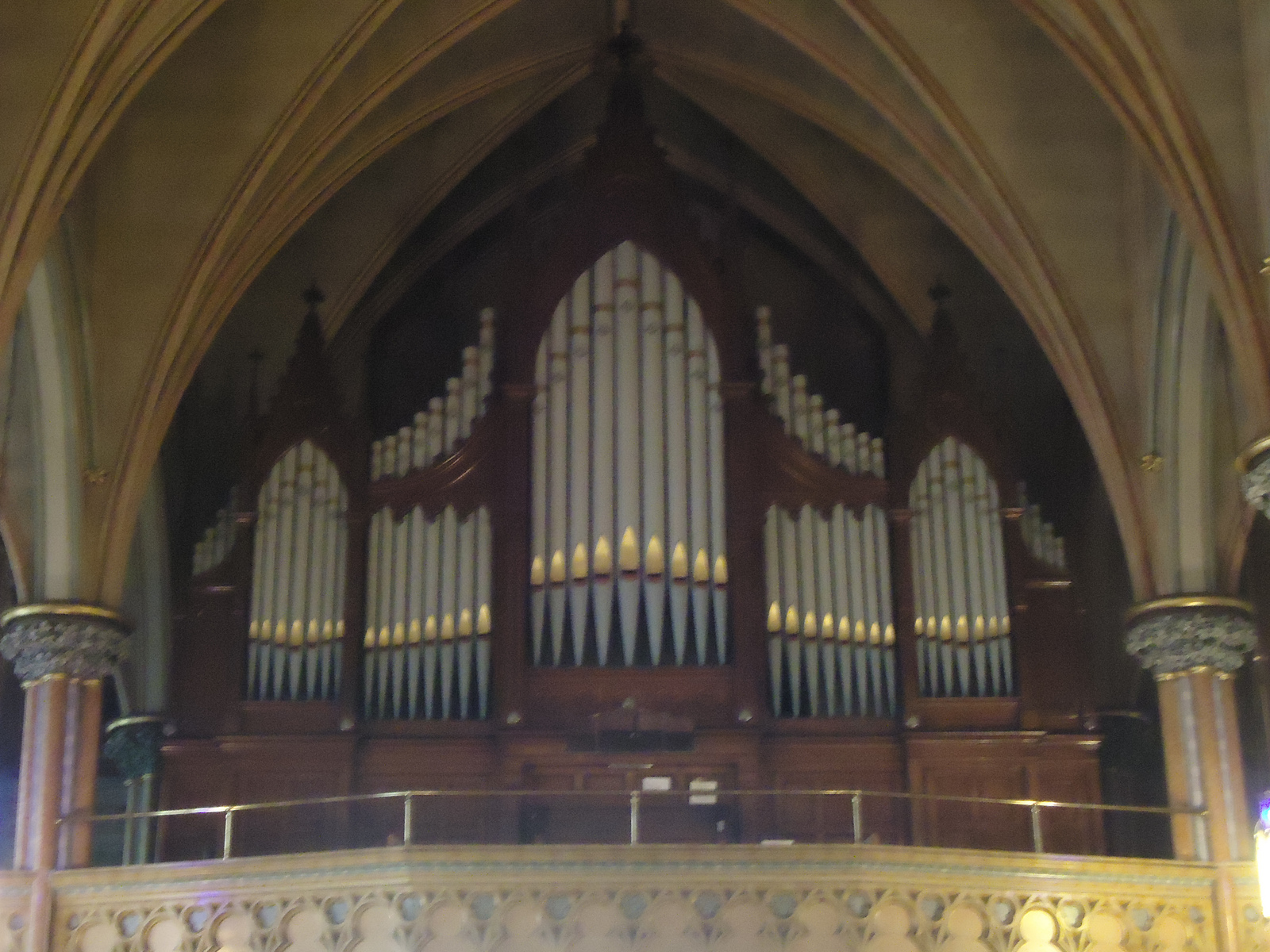
Historic Organ at St. Patrick's, 1898

=== Historic Organ ===
The organ at St. Patrick's Church was built by Casavant Frères of Québec in 1898. It is Casavant Frères #766 (originally Opus Nº 90) and is unchanged since it was built. It is the oldest Casavant still in use in Canada and is the only three-manual and pedal instrument built with pneumatic action that is still in its original condition in Canada today. It has 35 speaking stops and 2,212 pipes. This led to its designation in 2006 as a National Historic Organ by the Royal Canadian College of Organists.

=== Recent History ===
1960s and 1970s: After the changes made by Second Vatican Council, parts of the altar rail needed to be removed, some statues were taken away and a small altar table was placed before the high altar.

On the 14 September, 1984, high Mass was presented by His Holiness Pope John Paul II on the Halifax Common, which is very close to Saint Patrick's Church. In many pictures which were taken of the Mass, Saint Patrick's Church can be seen in the background.

2007: Parishioners were informed that Saint Patrick's would close. However, the closing date was extended to June 2008. Saint Patrick's now had the opportunity to raise funds in order to be able to restore and maintain the church. The Saint Patrick's Church Restoration Society was formed. In September, the official start of the fundraising campaign was announced. On 16 December George Frideric Handel's Oratorio, the Messiah, was performed by the Bedford Singers - the first concert in a series of eight fundraising concerts of The Saint Patrick's Church Restoration Society.

2008: The first Saint Patrick's Church New Year's levee was presented by The Restoration Society. On May Day, the Heritage Canada Foundation added Saint Patrick's Church to its Top Ten Endangered Places List of threatened architectural and heritage sites. In June the Saint Patrick's Church Restoration Society announced that enough money had been raised to save St. Patrick's Church. The Saint Patrick’s Church Restoration Society and the Archdiocese signed an agreement, that allows the Society to assume responsibility for the restoration and maintenance of the church.

=== St. Patrick's School ===
In 1857, a school was opened in the basement of the church. This was moved to a separate building in 1867. In 1921 St. Patrick's Boys' School was opened opposite the church. On the same street St. Patrick's Girls' School was opened in 1888. In 1954 the schools were merged and St. Patrick's High School was built on Quinpool Road.

=== Saint Patrick's Band ===
The Saint Patrick's Band, founded in 1873, was a famous local band in Victorian Halifax. Their music was eclectic and they were in great demand.

=== Jesuit Centre of Spirituality ===
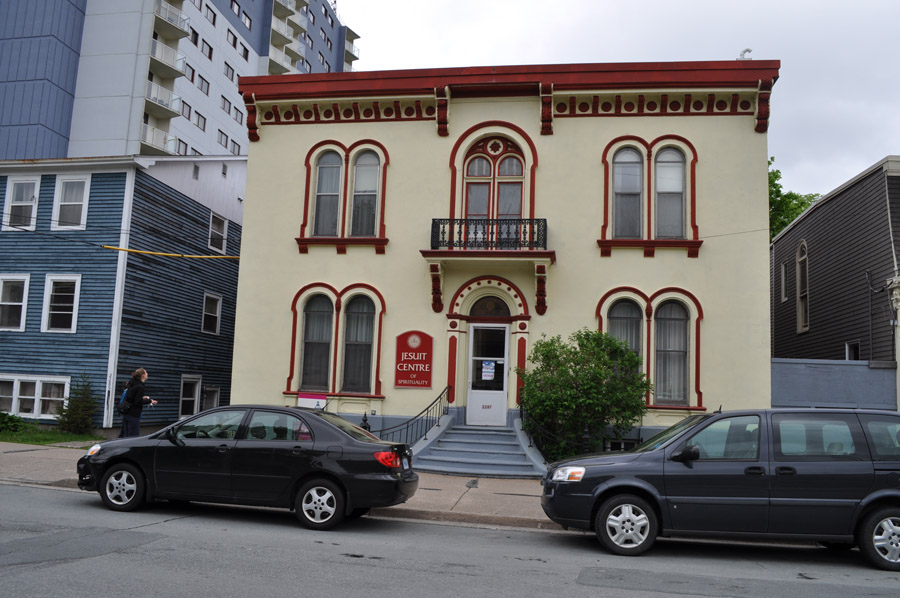
Jesuit Centre of Spirituality

The Jesuit presence in Halifax started in 1940 when they were handed the administration of St. Mary's College, which would become Saint Mary's University. The high school closed in 1963 and in 1974, the university was transferred to the Archdiocese of Halifax.

In 1952, the Jesuits founded the Canadian Martyrs' parish. In 2005, this was also transferred to the archdiocese. The Jesuits moved into the area and started to serve as priests later that decade. The Jesuits remained in the city and the following year they started the Jesuit Centre of Spirituality next to St. Patrick's church.

It is a non-residential centre for Ignatian spirituality. It offers spiritual direction, daily prayer with scripture, and the Spiritual Exercises of Ignatius of Loyola to people in Atlantic Canada.

== Interior Gallery ==
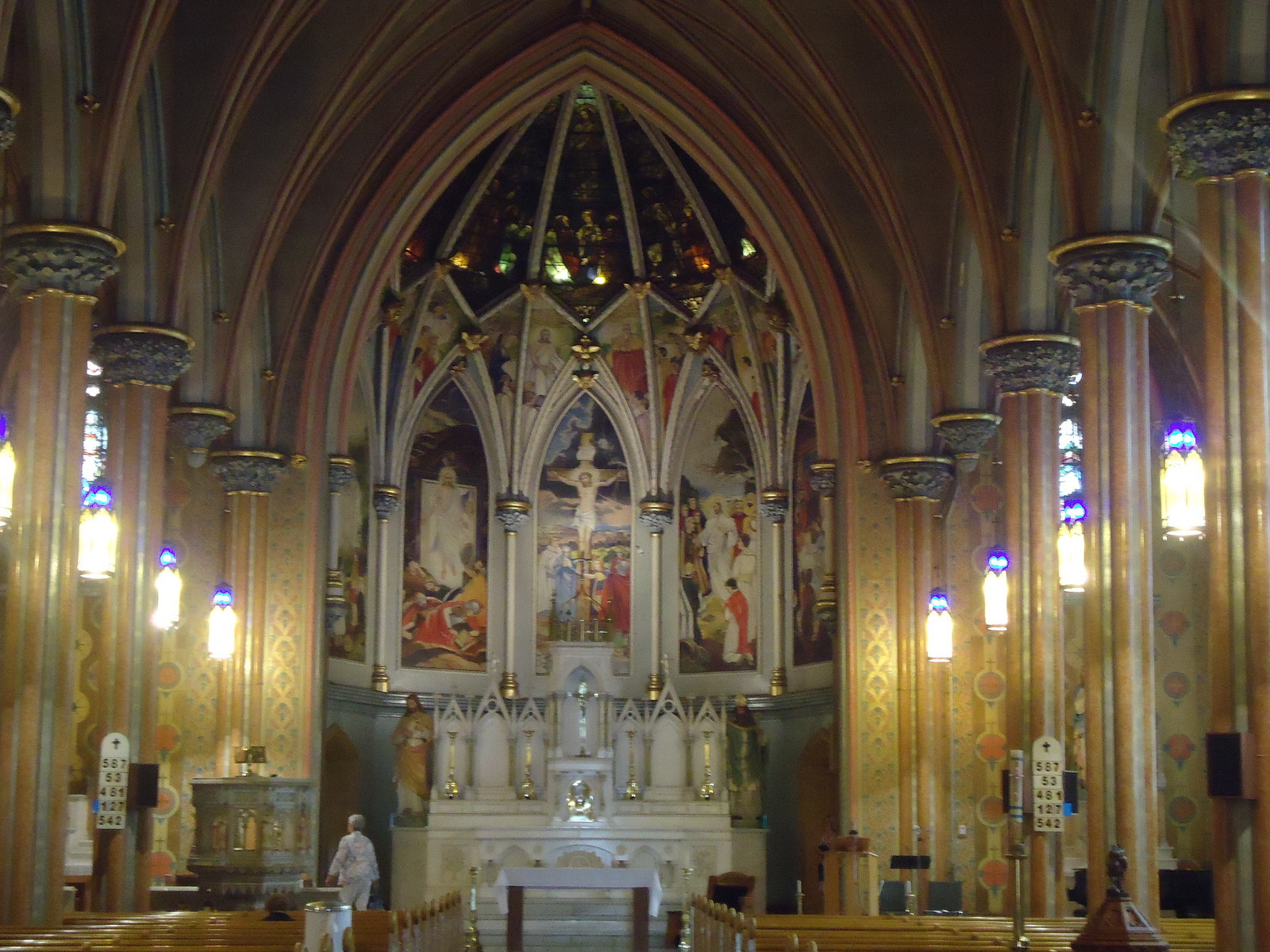
Nave, Altar, Murals

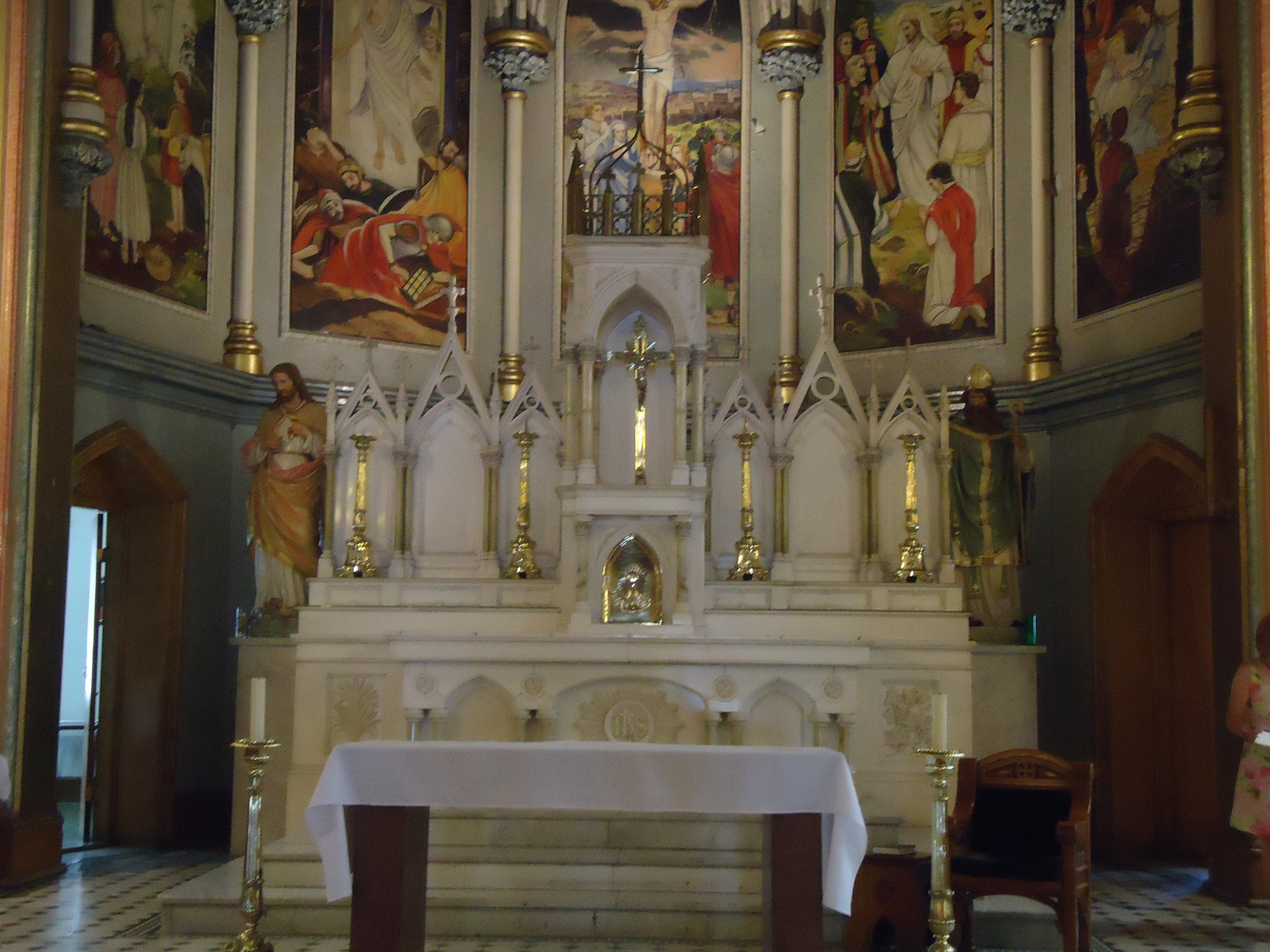
High Altar

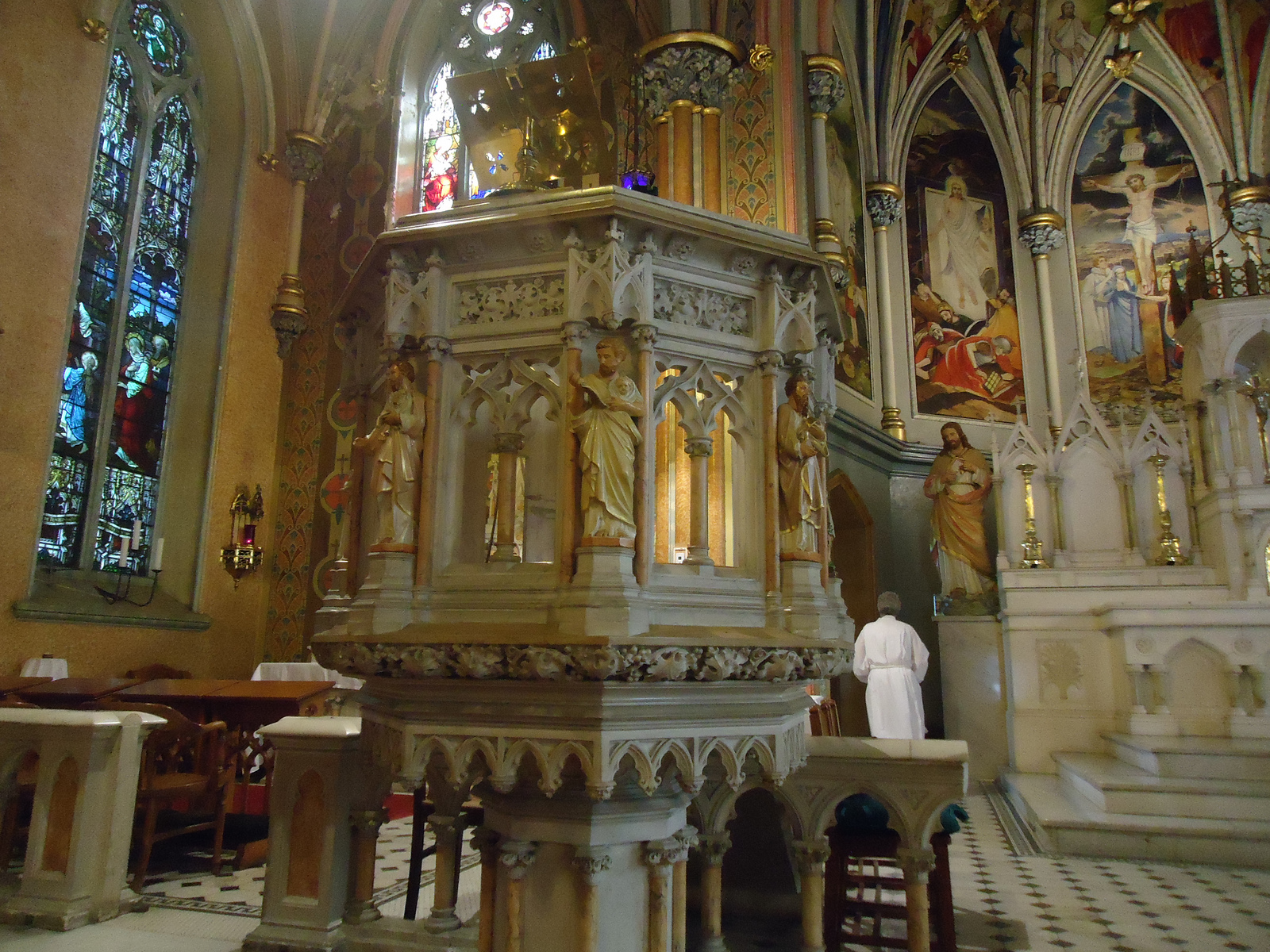
Pulpit

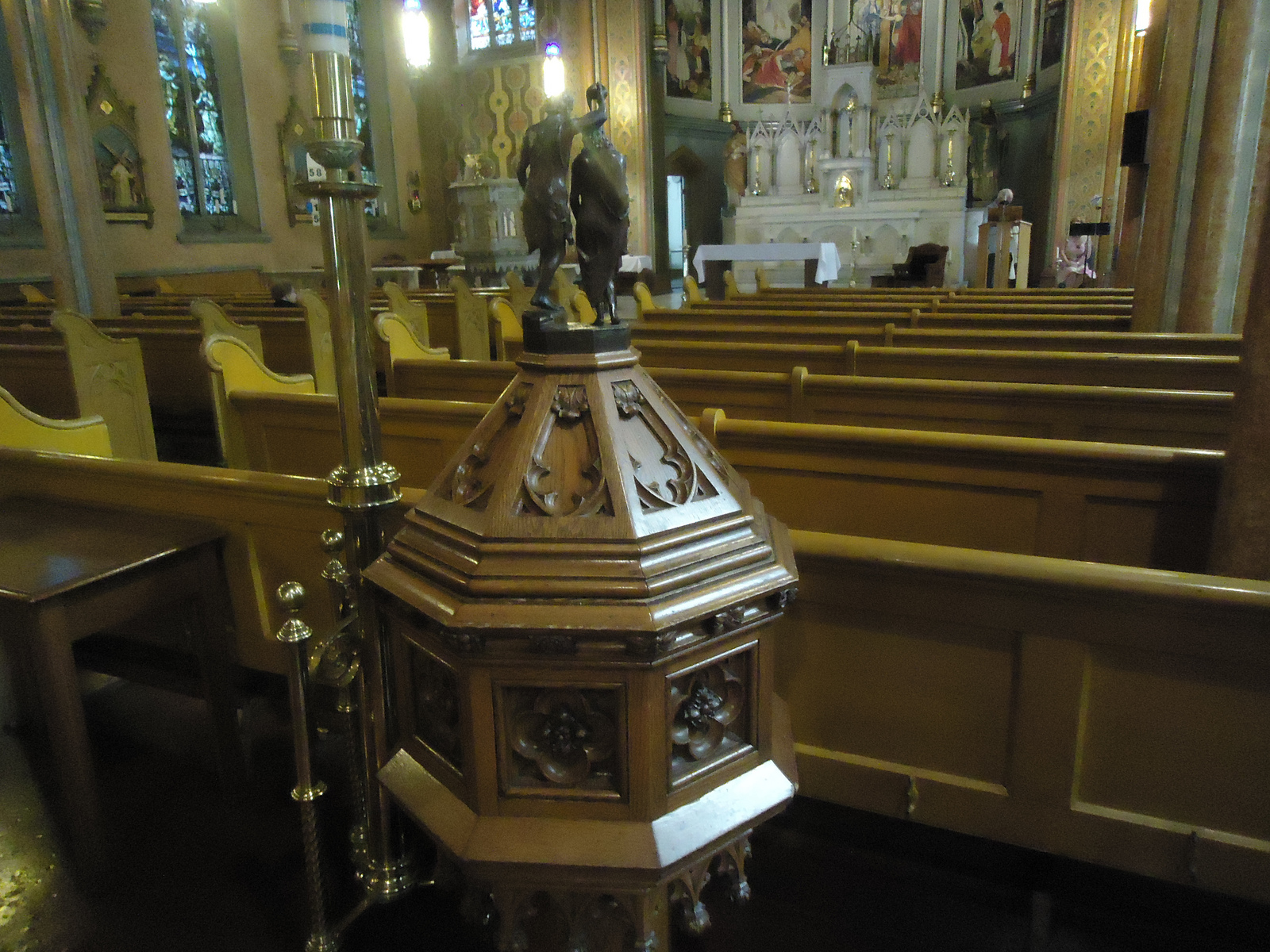
Baptismal Font

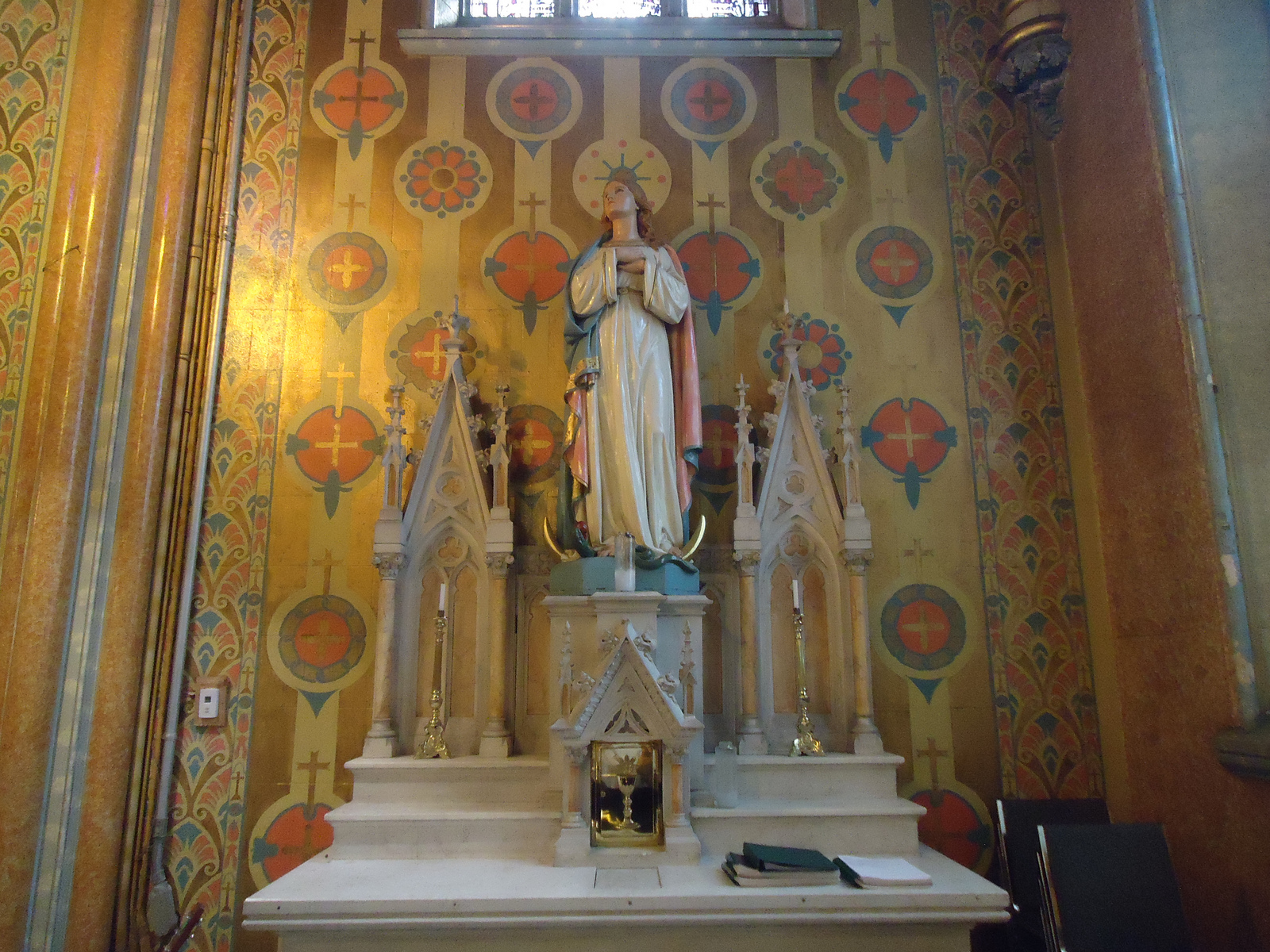
Lady Chapel

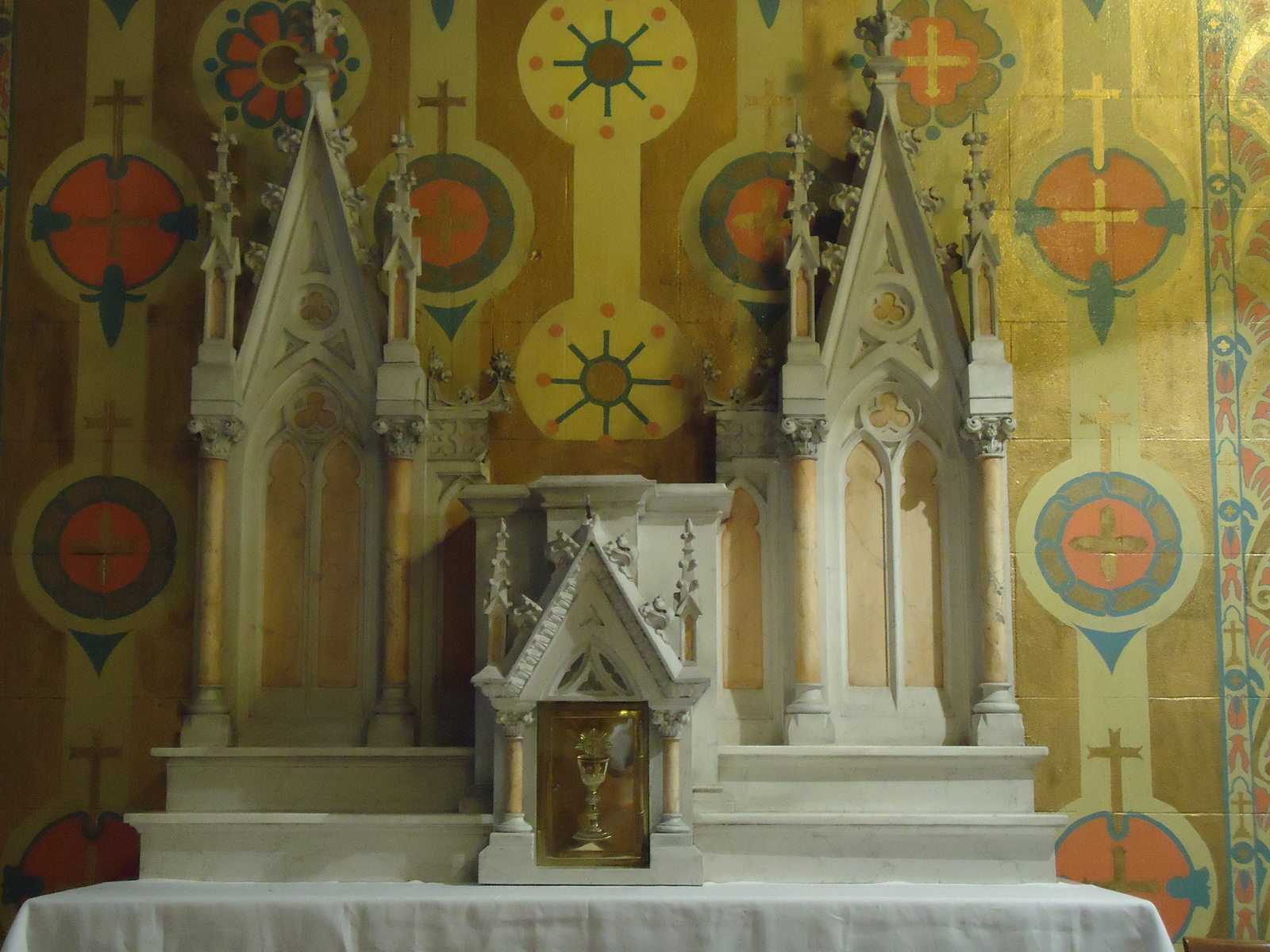
Blessed Sacrament Chapel

== See also ==
- List of historic places in Halifax, Nova Scotia
- List of Jesuit sites
