= Beaches, Newfoundland and Labrador =

Human settlement in Canada

Coordinates: 49°35′N 56°50′W

The Beaches is a local service district and designated place in the Canadian province of Newfoundland and Labrador. It is southwest of Baie Verte.

== Geography ==
Beaches is in Newfoundland within Subdivision E of Division No. 5.

== Demographics ==
As a designated place in the 2016 Census of Population conducted by Statistics Canada, Beaches recorded a population of 54 living in 24 of its 28 total private dwellings, a change of 28.6% from its 2011 population of 42. With a land area of 1.89 km^{2} (0.73 sq mi), it had a population density of 28.6/km^{2} (74.0/sq mi) in 2016.

== Government ==
Beaches is a local service district (LSD) that is governed by a committee responsible for the provision of certain services to the community. The chair of the LSD committee is Douglas Osmond.

== Notable Person ==
- Donna Morrissey

== See also ==
- List of communities in Newfoundland and Labrador
- List of designated places in Newfoundland and Labrador
- List of local service districts in Newfoundland and Labrador
