= Rockbound =

Novel

- Author: Frank Parker Day
- Language: English
- Publication date: 1928

Rockbound is a novel published in 1928 by Canadian writer Frank Parker Day.

== Overview ==
The "Rockbound" mentioned in the title is name of small fictitious island inspired by East Ironbound, a remote island near Big Tancook Island off the coast of Nova Scotia. Surrounded by rich but dangerous fishing grounds, Rockbound is isolated by storms, fog and winter weather. Two feuding families, the Jungs and the Krauses are dominated by the "king of Rockbound", the sternly righteous and rapacious Uriah Jung. When the young David Jung arrives on Rockbound to claim his inheritance, a small share of the island, he is forced to confront an unforgiving, and controlled world. His conflicts—both internal and external—lock him in a struggle for survival.

His enemies are many: sometimes the ocean, sometimes his own rude behaviour, sometimes his own best friend, sometimes his secret love for the island teacher, but always his relatives and their ambitions for money and power.

Rockbound paints a portrait of hard toil, cunning bitterness and family strife in the years leading to World War I. The novel evokes the infinite power, the terror and the cruel beauty of the Atlantic Ocean including the terrifying sinking of a fishing schooner based on the loss of the schooner Sylvia Mosher on August 9, 1926, during the 1926 August Gales at Sable Island.

== Inspiration ==
Mr. Day put out such a ridiculous book on the market belittling the inhabitants of his native province and those who befriended him ... portraying us humble inhabitants of our little island as ignorant, immoral and superstitious.

— Offended Citizens of Rockbound

Rockbound was based on the island of East Ironbound, Nova Scotia. Day spent the summer of 1926 on East Ironbound telling the families who welcomed him and shared their stories that he was working on a book about William Shakespeare. East Ironbound became a thinly disguised Rockbound while Tancook became the novel's Outpost Island; Lunenburg became Liscomb; and Pearl Island became Barren Island. East Ironbound's two main families the Fincks and the Youngs inspired Rockbound's rival families the Krauses and the Jungs. Day's interpretation, distortion and exaggeration of community and personal lives on East Ironbound offended the residents of the island who felt betrayed. They published a letter in the Lunenburg and Halifax papers accusing Day of exploiting them for money.

== Cultural impact ==
Rockbound was one of the selected novels in the 2005 edition of Canada Reads, where it was championed by Donna Morrissey. Rockbound eventually won the competition.

Rockbound was adapted as a musical by Allen Cole, commissioned by Two Planks and a Passion Theatre Company in Nova Scotia and presented at the Ross Creek Centre in July 2009.

Rockbound was first adapted as a full-length musical in 1998 by Whistling Fish Productions based in Mahone Bay, NS. The musical, which was publicly workshopped in Halifax, at Dalhousie University, was arranged by musician, Skip Beckwith, and featured songs and lyrics by Geoff Noble, with book by Susan Shillingford. The local cast of performers including noted actors Zach Fraser, Marguerite McNeil, and Elizabeth Richardson. Two stage productions ensued - -at the historical Capitol Theatre in Nelson, BC (2001), and the Mary Winspear Centre in Sidney, BC (2003).
