= Big Tancook Island Elementary School =

Location
- Big Tancook Island, Nova Scotia; Canada; 44°27′37″N 64°10′16″W

Information
- Opened: November 1, 1820; 205 years ago
- Principal: Ellen Smith
- Enrollment: 16
- Website: bigtancook.ednet.ns.ca

Big Tancook Island Elementary School is a public school in Big Tancook Island, Nova Scotia. It is one of Canada's last one-room school houses. There were sixteen students enrolled at the school for the 2021-22 term.
