= Mahone Islands Conservation Association =

Conservation group for Mahone Bay, Nova Scotia

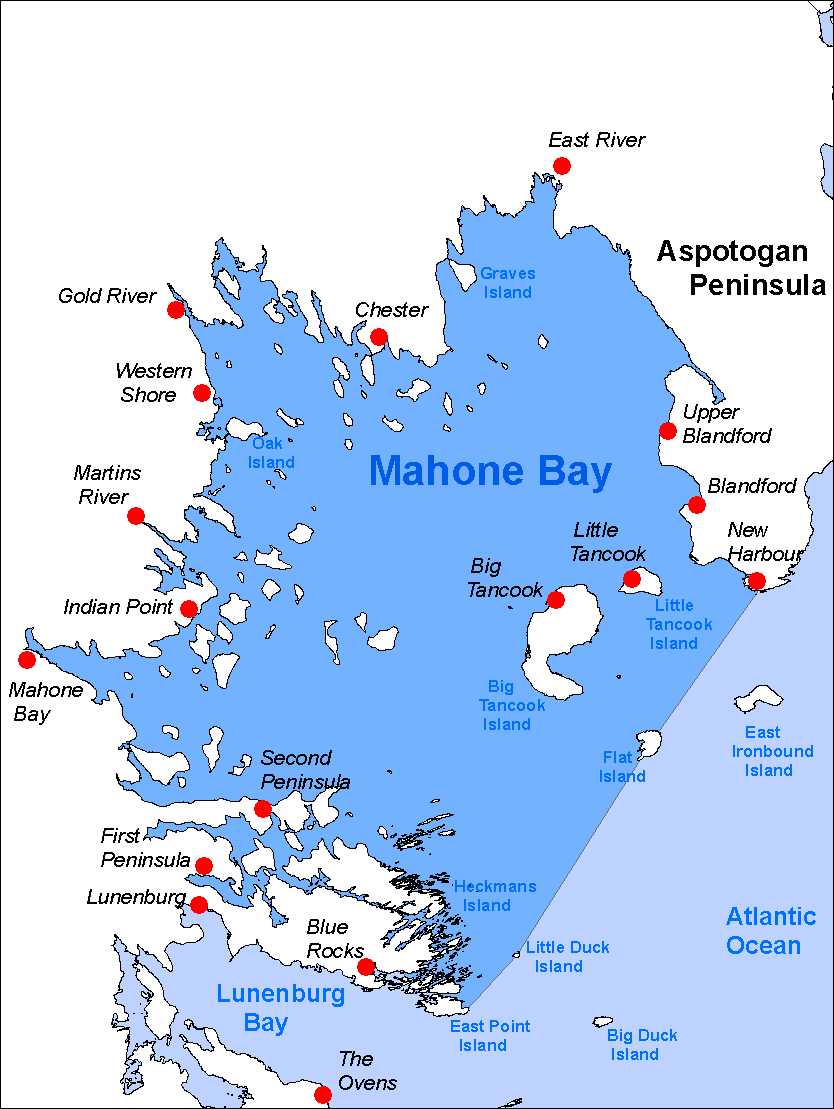
- Mahone Bay
- Nickname: MICA
- Location: Mahone Bay, Nova Scotia
- Website: http://www.mahoneislands.ns.ca/

Mahone Islands Conservation Association (MICA) is a not-for-profit organization dedicated to the conservation of islands and shoreline of Mahone Bay, Nova Scotia, Canada. The association was formed in reaction to private development of the area's islands which displaces nesting seabirds and threatens to spoil the landscape.

The association's actions have made the islands available for leave-no-trace activities. Under a stewardship agreement, islands are managed jointly by MICA and the province of Nova Scotia.

MICA receives funding from the Province of Nova Scotia and about 40 corporate sponsors, as well as local fundraising.

== Islands conserved ==
Islands acquired in partnership with MICA include: Andrews (the first to be acquired, in 2005), Backmans, Covey, Masons, Sacrifice, Shag, and Squid.

In 2007 MICA helped arrange the Long Island Preservation Society's donation of Long Island, Dry Island, Centre Island and Snipe Island to the province.

In 2013 MICA contributed $250,000 towards the province's purchase of Bella Island for $800,000, which forms a habitat for piping plover, common loon and other migratory birds.

In 2015 the McLennan family donated Goat Island to the province.
