= East Ironbound =

Island in Nova Scotia

- Location within Nova Scotia

Geography
- Location: South of the Aspotogan Peninsula, Nova Scotia
- Coordinates: 44.43923°N 64.0851°W

Administration
- Canada
- Province: Nova Scotia
- County: Lunenburg County

East Ironbound is an inhabited island located off the Aspotogan Peninsula in Lunenburg County, Nova Scotia, between St. Margarets Bay and Mahone Bay.

The East Ironbound Combined Lighthouse and Dwelling is a registered historic place.

== Cultural influence ==
The island is the focal point of the novel Rockbound.

In the summer of 1945 Jack L. Gray boarded with the Young family on the island and made many sketches of island life which subsequently were turned into large paintings.

Part of the film Deeply was filmed on East Ironbound.
