= Little Tancook Island =

Island in Nova Scotia, Canada

Coordinates: 44°28′20″N 64°8′1″W

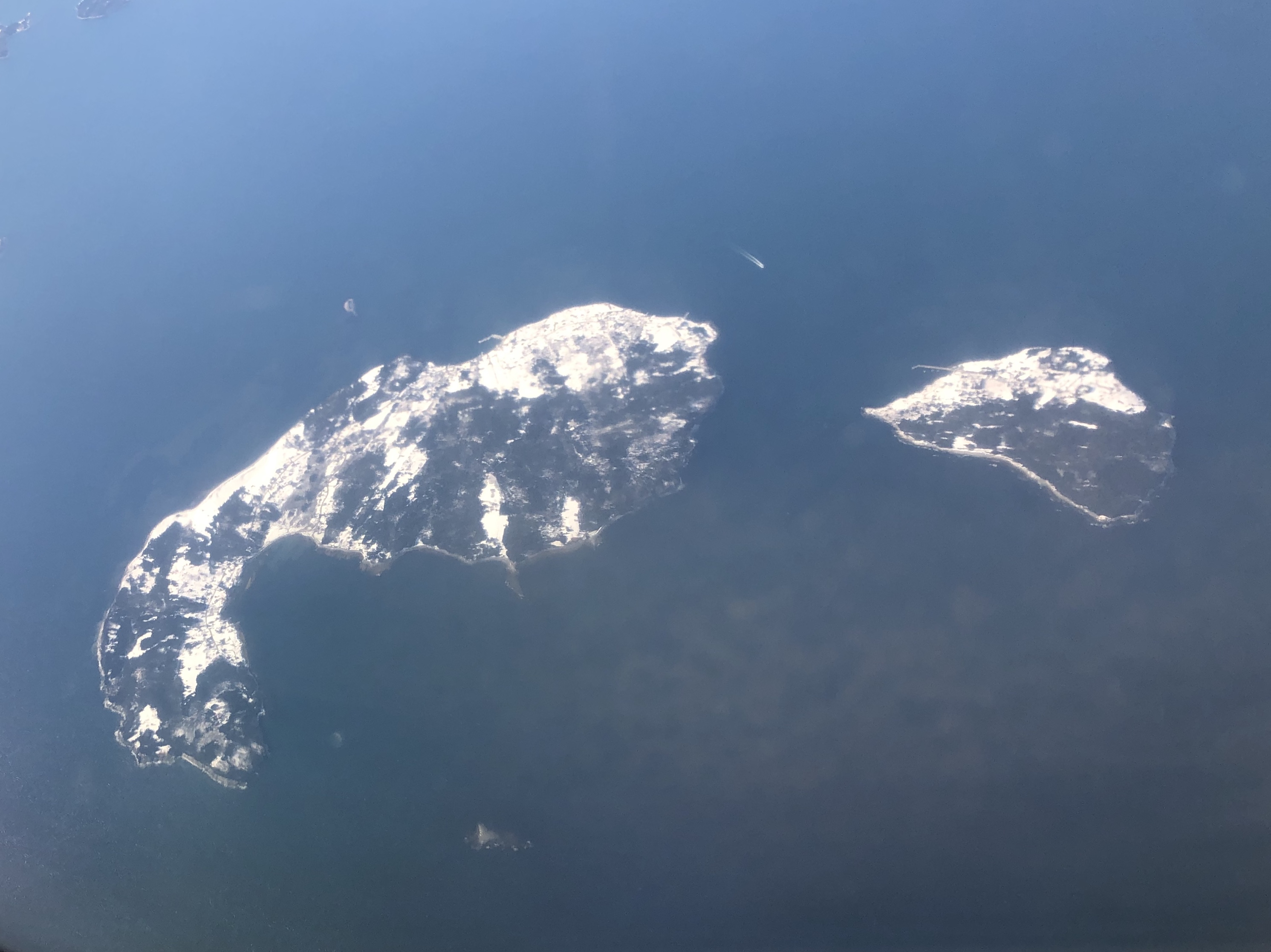
Big Tancook and Little Tancook, Nova Scotia

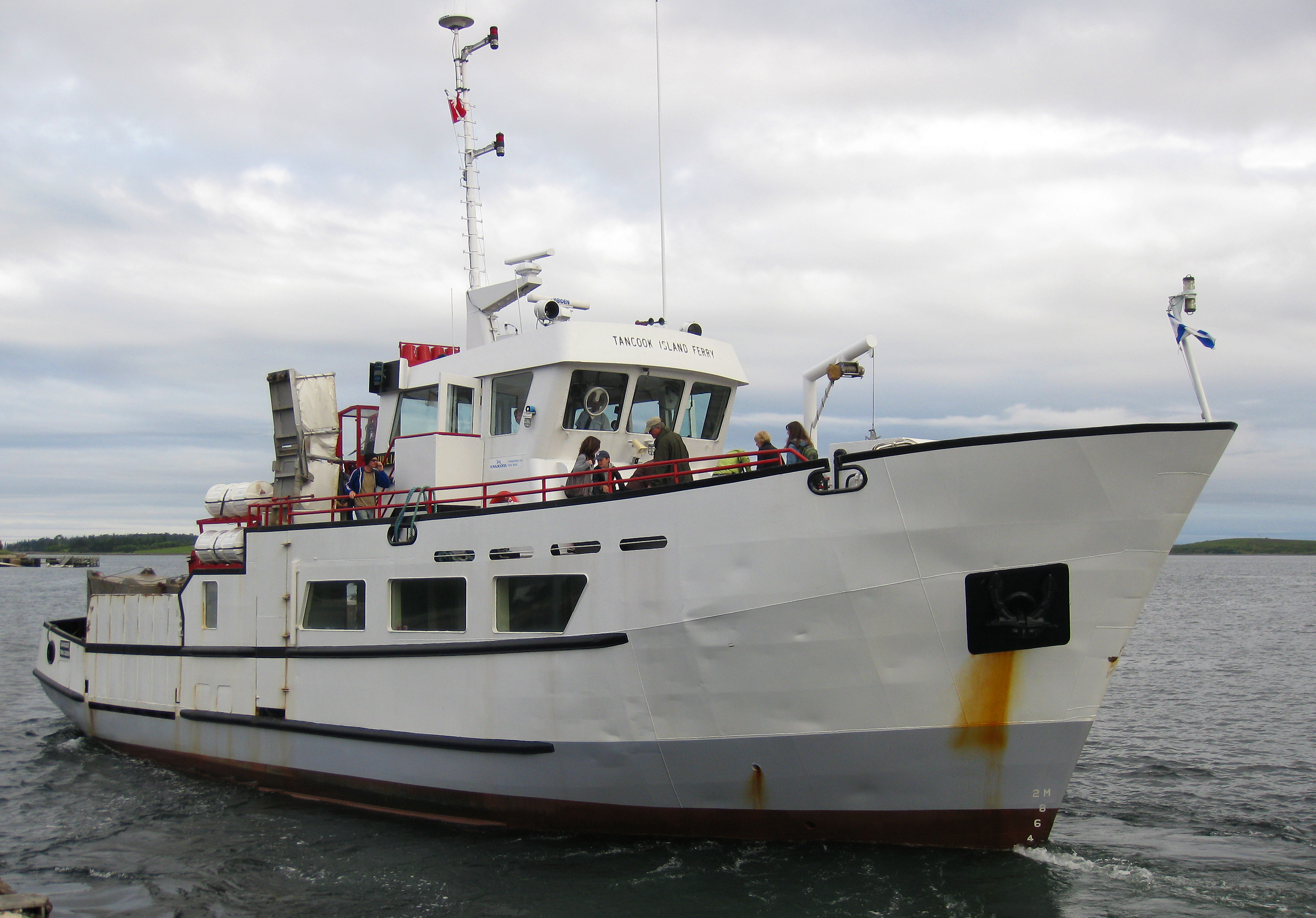
The ferry MV William G Ernst, leaving Chester, NS after boarding passengers for Little Tancook Island.

Little Tancook Island is a Canadian island located off the coast of Nova Scotia. The island is one of 365+ islands dotting Mahone Bay. The island is 1.5 km (0.93 mi) long by 1 km (0.62 mi) wide and is roughly triangular in shape. It is separated from Big Tancook Island by the 1 km (0.62 mi) wide strait called "The Chops." It is located approximately 2 km (1.2 mi) off the Aspotogan Peninsula.

It is the second largest island in Mahone Bay, after Big Tancook Island, with a population of approximately 30 full and part-time residents.

The island was once a summer fishing ground for Indigenous peoples. The word "Tancook" is an anglicized Mi'kmaq term that translates into "facing the open sea." The island was later settled by German immigrants.

== Transportation ==
A scheduled ferry service operates daily year-round from Big Tancook Island and Little Tancook to Chester. The MV William G. Ernst is a passenger-only ferry operated by the provincial Department of Transportation and Infrastructure Renewal. In 2020, the plans for a car ferry from Blandford to Big and Little Tancook were announced. The ferry will allow for shorter and more frequent trips, as well as easier access for emergency and transport vehicles to Big Tancook. However, the Little Tancook Island wharf does not support the off-boarding of vehicles from the ferry. Passengers must disembark on foot.
