= Mabel Killam Day =

Canadian artist

- Born: Mabel Killam; July 7, 1884; Yarmouth, Canada
- Died: August 26, 1960 (aged 76); Yarmouth, Canada
- Known for: Painting
- Spouse: Frank Parker Day (m. 1910; died in 1950)

Mabel Killam Day (1884–1960) was a Canadian artist. She specialized in painting urban life, landscapes, seascapes, and still life arrangements.

== Biography ==
Mabel Killam was born in Yarmouth, Nova Scotia, on July 7, 1884. Between 1900 and 1904, she studied art under John Hammond at the Mount Allison Ladies' College, presumably developing the ability to paint atmospheric land and seascapes as well as conventional still life arrangements. In 1905, Killam moved to New York City where she studied with Robert Henri at the New York School of Art and later at the Henri School of Art on Broadway, where she was a contemporary of Edward Hopper and George Bellows. Henri said of her, "Anyone who can make such a fresh, frank, (and) big transcriptions from nature . . . . . . can be a great artist and a true one." In New York City she began painting portraits of her friends and colleagues as well as scenes of urban life in New York. Killam moved back to Nova Scotia around 1907 and painted modern seascapes. She married Frank Parker Day (1881–1950), an English professor at the University of New Brunswick in 1910. They lived in Fredericton, New Brunswick, for two years before moving to Pittsburgh, Pennsylvania, in 1912. Frank was the Head of the English Department and Director of Academic Studies at the Carnegie Institute of Technology, and Mabel immediately became active in the local art community.

During WWI, Mabel Killam Day lived in London while her husband served in the Canadian Forces. In 1918, after the war, they returned to Yarmouth, where their son Donald was born. In 1926, the Days moved to Philadelphia, and in 1928 they moved to Schenectady, New York. They moved back to Yarmouth, Nova Scotia in 1933, where Mabel continued to paint and exhibit well into her seventies.

== Art career ==
Mabel Killam Day's first exhibition of her work occurred in New York in 1909, and her first solo exhibition was in 1923 at the Carnegie Institute of Pittsburgh. Mabel Killam Day also exhibited at the Associated Artists of Pittsburgh Annual Exhibition from 1912 to 1914, the Carnegie Institute's International Exhibition of Painting from 1913-1914, and the First Annual Experimentalist Salon in 1913. She displayed work at the 1920, 1923, and 1926 Carnegie Institute International Exhibitions of Painting; the 1922, 1926, and 1927 Annual Exhibitions of the Associated Artists of Pittsburgh; and the 118th Annual Exhibition of the Pennsylvania Academy of Fine Arts in 1923. She had another solo exhibition of her work in Schenectady at the College Women's Club in 1929. In Yarmouth, Mabel continued to exhibit her work with the Nova Scotia Society of Artists and the Maritime Art Association. Posthumously, she was honoured with a solo exhibition in 1996 by the Acadia University Art Gallery and the Dalhousie University Art Gallery.

Her work is included in the collections of the National Gallery of Canada, the Dalhousie Arts Centre, the Acadia University Art Gallery, the Art Gallery of Nova Scotia, the Nova Scotia Museum, and the Owens Art Gallery.

== Death ==
Mabel Killam Day died on August 26, 1960, in her hometown of Yarmouth, Nova Scotia.
