= Anosh Irani =

Canadian writer

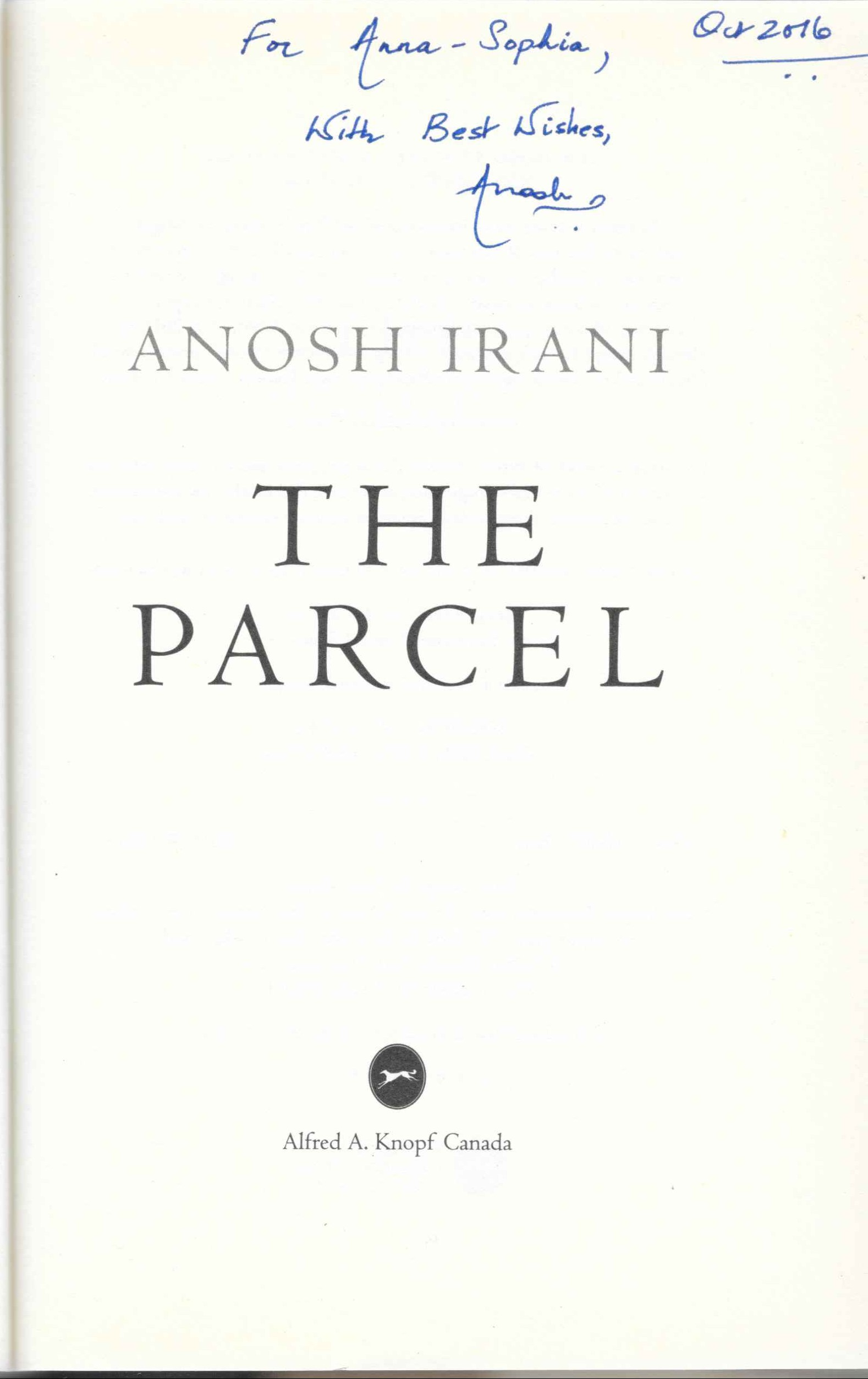
Anosh Irani's signature on a copy of his novel The Parcel

Anosh Irani on Bookbits radio talks about Dahanu Road.

Anosh Irani (born 1974) is an Indo-Canadian novelist and playwright, born and raised in Mumbai.

== Career ==
Anosh Irani has published four critically acclaimed novels: The Cripple and His Talismans (2004), a national bestseller; The Song of Kahunsha (2006), which was an international bestseller and shortlisted for Canada Reads and the Ethel Wilson Fiction Prize; Dahanu Road (2010), which was longlisted for the Man Asian Literary Prize; and The Parcel (2016), which was a finalist for the Governor General's Literary Award for Fiction and the Writers’ Trust Fiction Prize.

His play Bombay Black (2006) won the Dora Mavor Moore Award for Outstanding New Play, as did his one-man show Buffoon (2019). His anthology The Bombay Plays: The Matka King & Bombay Black (2007) and his play The Men in White (2018) were both finalists for the Governor General's Literary Award for Drama, and in 2023 Irani was the recipient of the Writers’ Trust Engel Findley Award. His latest play, Behind the Moon (2023), was a finalist for the Dora Mavor Moore Award for Outstanding New Play.

Irani's short stories have appeared in Granta and the Los Angeles Review of Books and have been collected in Translated from the Gibberish: Seven Stories and One Half Truth (2019). His nonfiction has been published in the Globe and Mail, the Toronto Star, the Guardian, and the New York Times. His work has been translated into eleven languages, and he teaches fiction and playwriting in the School of Creative Writing at the University of British Columbia.

== Works ==
- The Matka King (2003, play)
- The Cripple and His Talismans (2004, novel) ISBN 978-1-55192-803-6, Raincoast Books
- Bombay Black (2006, play)
- The Song of Kahunsha (2006, novel) ISBN 978-0-385-66229-1, Anchor Canada
- My Granny the Goldfish (2010, play)
- Dahanu Road (2010, novel) ISBN 978-0-385-66699-2, Doubleday Canada
- The Parcel (2016, novel)
- Swimming coach. In Granta #141, Canada, 2017, pp 123 – 135.
- The Men in White (2018, play)
- Buffoon (2019, play)
- Translated from the Gibberish: Seven Stories and One Half Truth (2019, short stories)
- Behind the Moon (2023, play)

== Awards ==
Career Awards:

- Writers’ Trust Engel Findley Award (“In recognition of a remarkable body of work.”), 2023
- Capilano University Distinguished Alumnus Award, 2010

Novel Awards:

- Dublin Literary Award, Longlist (The Parcel), 2018
- DSC Prize for South Asian Literature, Longlist (The Parcel), 2017
- Ethel Wilson Fiction Prize, Finalist (The Parcel), 2017
- Governor General's literary Award for Fiction, Finalist (The Parcel), 2016
- Rogers Writers’ Trust Fiction Prize, Finalist (The Parcel), 2016
- “Best Books of the Year” for The Parcel, 2016
- Quill and Quire, The Walrus, Globe and Mail, CBC Books, National Post
- Man Asian Literary Prize, Longlist (Dahanu Road), 2010
- Ontario Library Association Evergreen Award, Shortlist (Dahanu Road), 2010
- Canada Reads, Finalist (The Song of Kahunsha), 2007
- Ethel Wilson Fiction Prize, Finalist (The Song of Kahunsha), 2006

Theatre Awards:

- Behind the Moon: Jessie Richardson Award (2025) Outstanding Production. 5 wins in total.
- Behind the Moon: Dora Mavor Moore Award, Finalist, Outstanding New Play, 2023
- Buffoon: Dora Mavor Moore Award, Winner, Outstanding New Play, 2020
- The Men in White: Governor General's Literary Award, Finalist, 2018
- The Men in White: 3 Jessie Award Nominations, incl. Outstanding Original Script, 2017
- Bombay Black: 3 Dora Mavor Moore Award Nominations, 1 Win, 2015
- The Globe and Mail's “Best of Toronto, Stratford, and Shaw Theatre,” 2015
- The Bombay Plays: Governor General's Literary Award, Finalist, 2007
- Bombay Black: 4 Dora Mavor Moore Award Wins, incl. Outstanding New Play, 2006
- The Matka King: 3 Jessie Award Nominations, incl. Outstanding, 2003
