= Frank Parker Day =

Canadian athlete, academic and author

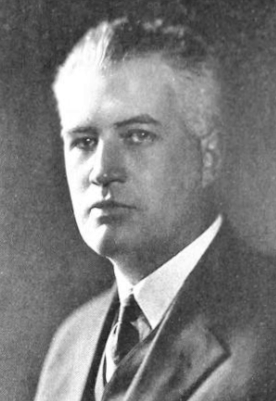
- Born: 9 May 1881; Shubenacadie, Nova Scotia, Canada
- Died: 30 July 1950 (aged 69); Yarmouth, Nova Scotia, Canada
- Resting place: Nova Scotia, Canada
- Education: Mount Allison University, Oxford University
- Occupations: Writer, soldier, naturalist
- Spouse: Mabel Killam Day
- Children: Donald Day
- Writing career
- Language: English
- Notable awards: Canada Reads Winner
- Military career
- Allegiance: Canada
- Branch: Canadian Army
- Service years: 1915–1918
- Rank: Colonel
- Units: 185th Canadian Infantry Battalion
- Conflicts: World War I

Frank Parker Day (9 May 1881 – 30 July 1950) was a Canadian athlete, academic and author.

Since Day's father was a Methodist minister who moved to a new congregation every three years, Day spent his youth living throughout Nova Scotia, in Wallace, Acadia Mines, Mahone Bay, Boylston, and Lockeport.

== Early life and education ==
Frank Parker Day was born in Shubenacadie, Nova Scotia on 9 May 1881. When he was seventeen, he attended Lunenburg Academy and from there went on to earn a BA, in 1903 from Mount Allison University. Day was a member of the varsity rugby football team while completing his undergraduate studies. On the school's new athletic field Day scored Mount Allison's first points in the intercollegiate Rugby football in 1900.

He later won a Rhodes Scholarship, studying at Oxford University in 1905. Day was an athlete, and won the Oxford-Cambridge Heavyweight Championship. Returning to Canada, he embarked on an academic career, teaching English at the University of New Brunswick, before being appointed president of Union College in Schenectady, New York.

== War service ==
Having served with the King Edward's Light Horse while at Oxford University, followed by a year with the 28th New Brunswick Dragoons before filling the position of junior major with the 85th Overseas Battalion, Day served in the Canadian Army. where he played a crucial role in recruiting and training of the 185th Canadian Infantry Battalion (Cape Breton Highlanders), CEF.

Details of the 94th Victoria Regiment "Argyll Highlanders" were called out on active service on 6 August 1914 for local protection duties.

The 85th Battalion (Nova Scotia Highlanders), CEF was authorized on 10 July 1915 and embarked for Great Britain on 12 October 1916. It disembarked in France on 10 February 1917, where it fought as part of the 12th Infantry Brigade, 4th Canadian Division in France and Flanders until the end of the war. The battalion was subsequently disbanded on 15 September 1920.

The 185th Canadian Infantry Battalion (Cape Breton Highlanders), CEF was authorized on 15 July 1916 with Day as its lieutenant colonel, and embarked for Great Britain on 12 October 1916. There it provided reinforcements for the Canadian Corps in the field until 15 February 1918, when its personnel were absorbed by the 17th Reserve Battalion, CEF. Day then commanded the 25th Battalion from August to October 1918.

== Literary career ==
He practiced writing poetry, songs, essays, and news items during his student and army days. After the war he wrote stories for the Atlantic Monthly and Harper's Magazine.

- "Roses of Mercatel", Carnegie Institute of Technology, Pittsburgh, School of Music and Drama, 1920
- "The Hour Before Dawn", Carnegie Institute of Technology, Pittsburgh, School of Music and Drama, 1921
- "An Epic of Marble Mountain", Harper's Magazine, New York, 1923
- "The Iroquois", Atlantic Monthly 1923

== Writings ==
- River of Strangers, Doubleday, Page & Co., New York 1926
- The Autobiography of a Fisherman, Doubleday, Page & Co., New York 1927
- Rockbound, Minton, Balch & Co., New York 1928
- John Paul's Rock, Minton, Balch & Co., New York 1932
- A Good Citizen, Mount Allison University, Sackville, NB (Josiah Wood Lectures)

== Awards ==
His novel Rockbound was chosen for inclusion in Canada Reads 2005, championed by Donna Morrissey. Rockbound eventually won the competition.

== Later life ==
When the Days came back to Nova Scotia to live, they still had a struggle to make a living as Frank's medical expenses had been considerable, including the cost of convalescing in the Southern States and the West Indies. Frank was unsuccessful in getting war disability allowance. His arthritis had stemmed from a blow on the back during a battle in World War I. Retiring to the family cottage the Days spent their time at the tiny village of Lake Annis in Yarmouth County, where Frank spent his time with friends Harry Hamilton and Joe (Jim) Charles, the Mi'kmaq guide in Hectanooga. They spent their season fishing, hunting, and paddling the waterways of Yarmouth County.

Frank Parker Day died at his home in Yarmouth on 30 July 1950.
