= Joseph Purcell =

Canadian artist (1927–2017)

Joseph Douglas Purcell (Halifax, Nova Scotia, 1927 – Lunenburg, Nova Scotia, 2017) was a Canadian artist from Nova Scotia.

== Early life and education ==
Joseph Purcell was born and first lived in Halifax, Nova Scotia. He started painting as a young child. He studied art for three years at the Nova Scotia College of Art.

As a teenager, he travelled to the Grand Banks of Newfoundland with fishermen from Lunenburg. He painted them on their schooners and trawlers.

== Career ==
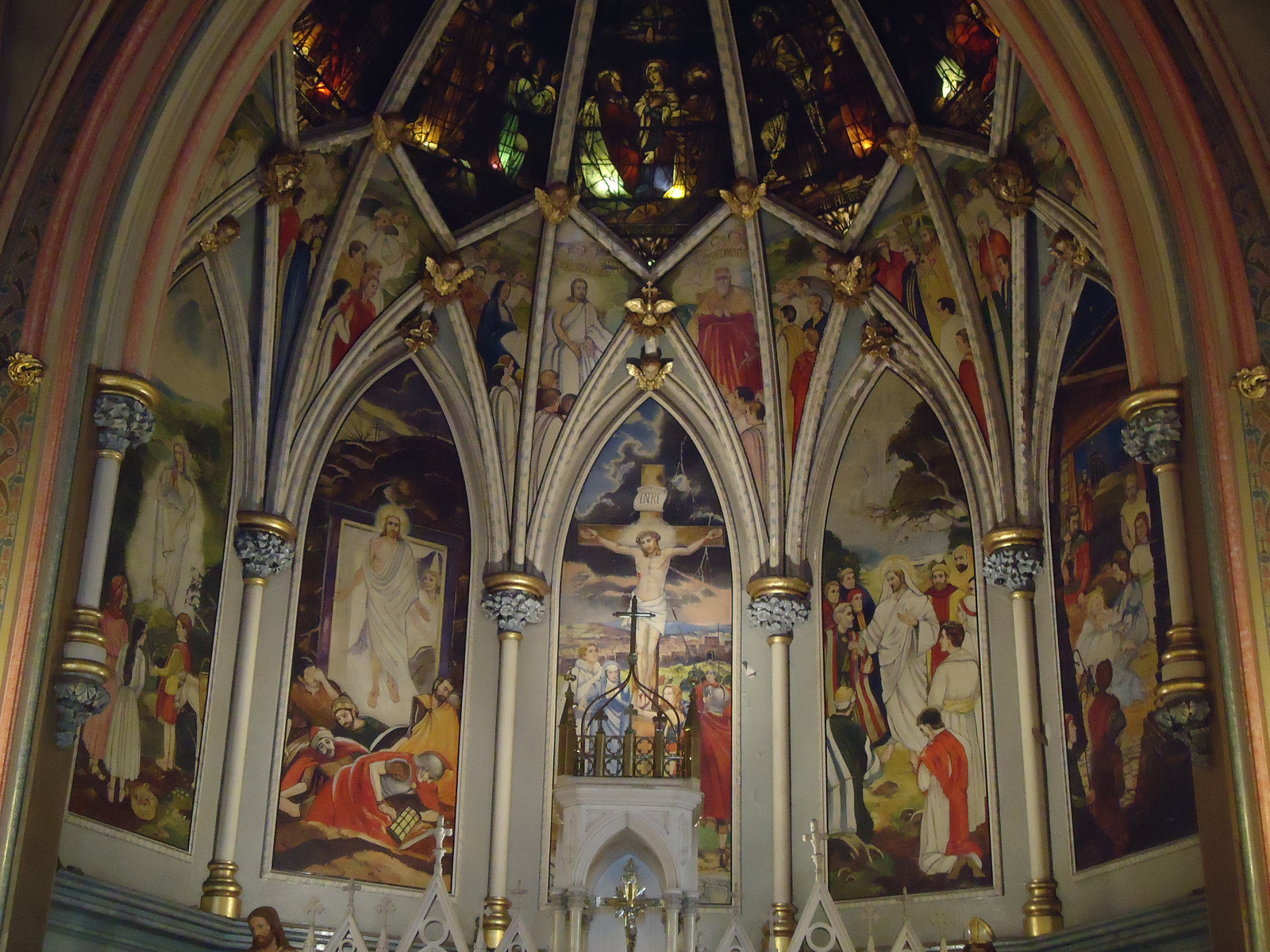
Murals by Joseph Purcell at St. Patrick's Church in Halifax, 1953

Purcell completed various large commissions. At the age of eighteen, Purcell completed a commission of three large murals for hotels of the Canadian National Railway.

He established himself as a professional painter when he was just twenty years old.

Purcell's paintings were done with both watercolor and oil. His main interest was painting land- and seascapes of the eastcoast of Canada.

In 1953, Purcell was commissioned to paint the well-known murals above the high altar in the historic St. Patrick's Church in Halifax. He painted pictures of Halifax for the Seagram's Collection "Cities of Canada", which toured around the world. He presented a collection of large oil paintings of gold mining in Nova Scotia. These paintings, known as "The Seabright Collection", hang at the Nova Scotia Museum of Industry.

== Personal life ==
In 1953, Purcell moved to Lunenburg with his wife, Tela Purcell, who is also an artist. The South Shore of Nova Scotia is where he found the themes which were to be the basis for his paintings for the rest of his career. He became one of the most popular artists in Atlantic Canada. He continued to paint into his ninetieth year. He had two strokes when he was older, but he recovered and continued to paint for another ten years.

== Death and legacy ==
In 2017, at the age of 90, he died at his home in Lunenburg.

Purcell's work has been presented in galleries across Canada, England and the United States. His murals hang in numerous public buildings, historic churches - such as the murals in four churches in Nova Scotia and also in naval establishments in Canada. His work is also in art museums including the Art Gallery of Nova Scotia, the Nova Scotia Museum of Industry in Stellarton, N.S., the Montreal Museum of Fine Arts, and the National Gallery of Canada in Ottawa.

== Awards ==
When he was 23, he won the O’Keefe Art Award, a national competition. He was awarded the Queen's Jubilee Medal for lifetime achievement.
