= Big Tancook Island =

Island in Nova Scotia, Canada

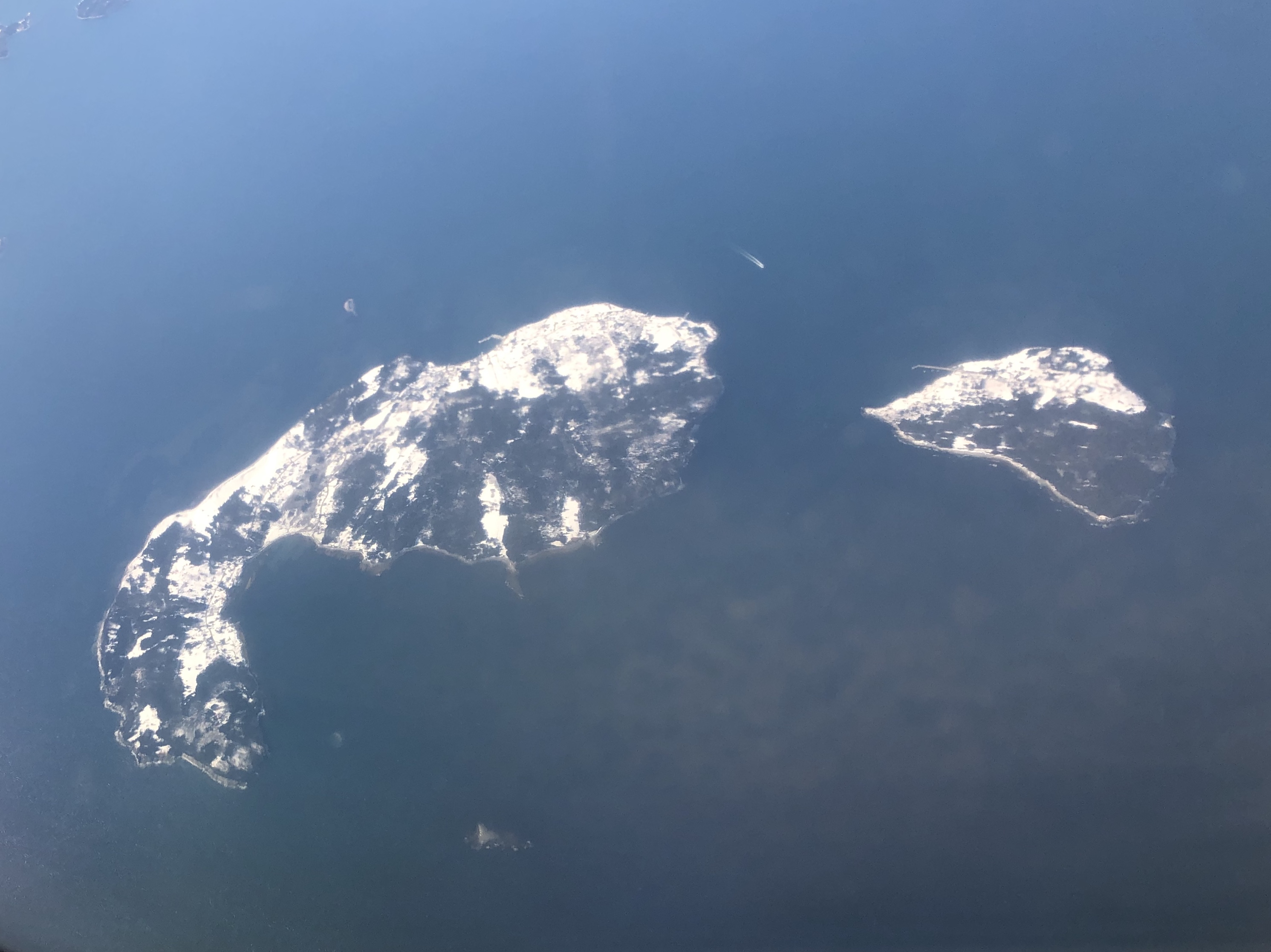

- Location within Nova Scotia

Geography
- Location: Mahone Bay
- Coordinates: 44.457°N 64.166°W

Administration
- Canada
- Province: Nova Scotia
- County: Lunenburg County

Demographics
- Population: ~200 (summer) ~150 (winter)

Big Tancook Island is the largest of many islands in Mahone Bay, Nova Scotia. It measures approximately 4 km (2.5 mi) (north to south) by 1.6 km (1.0 mi) forming roughly a "C" shape. Its area is 550 acres (2.2 km^{2}) and has a rocky shoreline with open fields and softwood forest dotted by ponds, residential properties and fish stores. It is separated from nearby Little Tancook Island to the east by a 1 km (0.6 mi) wide strait called "The Chops". Big Tancook Island is approximately 4 km (2.5 mi) from Sandy Cove Point on the Aspotogan Peninsula - the nearest point on the mainland. Wildlife populations are limited to deer, muskrats, snakes, and pheasants, and a great variety of birds.

The community of Big Tancook is the only one located on Big Tancook Island. It has a population of about 200 in summer and 150 in winter. It is home to one of the last remaining one-room schoolhouses in Canada: Big Tancook Island Elementary School, which also serves Little Tancook Island. High school students must be transported to the mainland town of Chester, Nova Scotia.

The island was once a summer fishing ground for Indigenous peoples. The word "Tancook" is an anglicized Mi'kmaq term that translates into "facing the open sea." The island was later settled by German immigrants.

The residents primarily make their living through lobster fishing, or the ferry service. Several small professional and artistic businesses operate on and from the island.

== Transportation ==
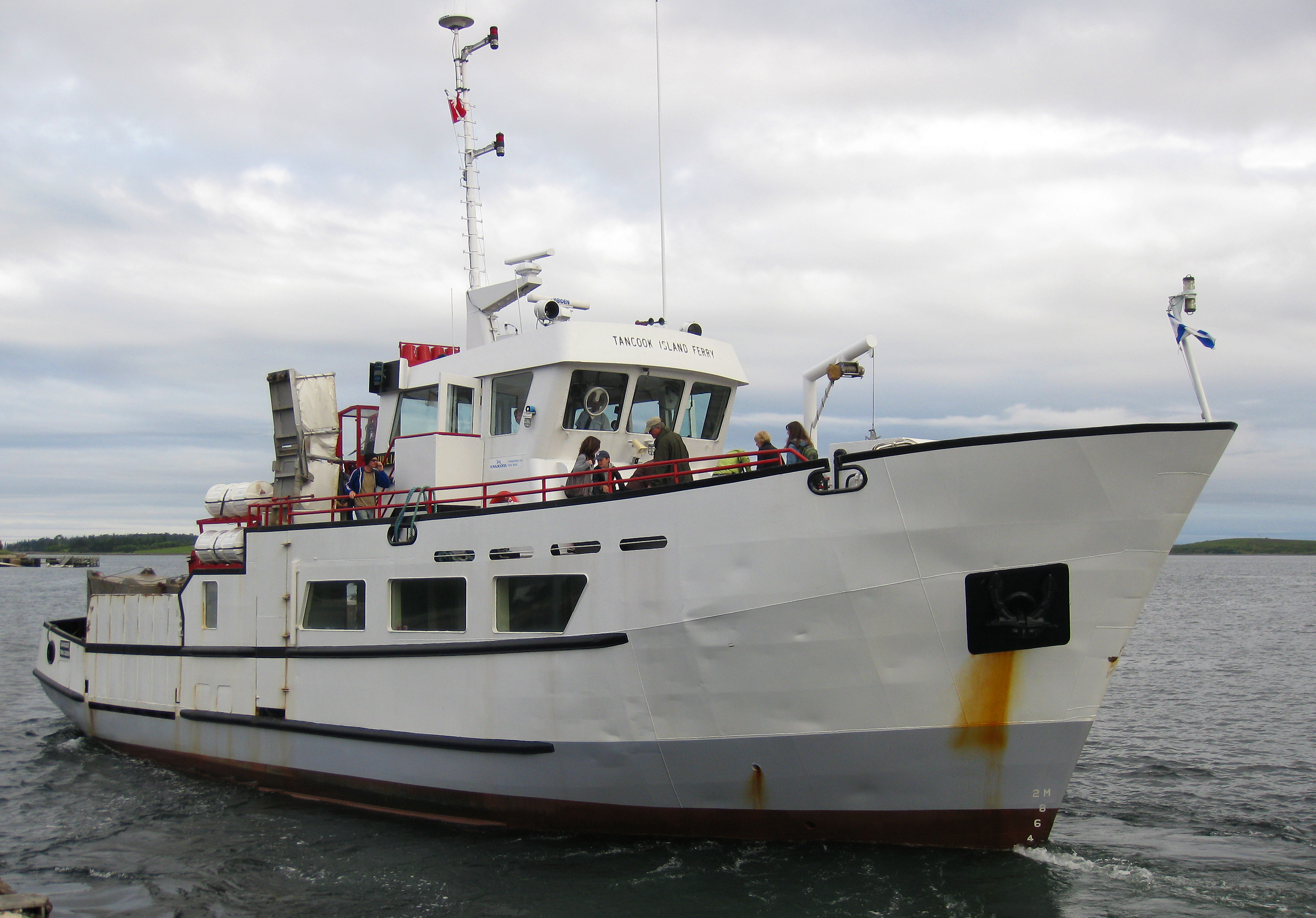
The ferry William G Ernst, leaving Chester, NS after boarding passengers for Big Tancook Island.

A scheduled ferry service operates daily year-round from Big Tancook Island and Little Tancook to Chester. The MV William G. Ernst is a passenger-only ferry operated by the provincial Department of Transportation and Infrastructure Renewal. Emergency response is provided by the Big Tancook Island Emergency Response Association (BTIERA), which is supported through volunteer efforts and community fundraising. In 2020, the plans for a car ferry from Blandford to Tancook were announced. The ferry will allow for shorter and more frequent trips, as well as easier access for emergency and transport vehicles.
