= Canada Reads =

Canadian book competition

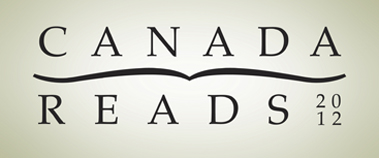
- Other names: Le Combat des livres (French)
- Running time: 30 minutes
- Country of origin: Canada
- Language: English
- Home station: CBC Radio One
- TV adaptations: CBC Television; CBC Newsworld; Bold TV
- Hosted by: Jian Ghomeshi; Bill Richardson; Mary Walsh; Wab Kinew; Gill Deacon; Ali Hassan
- Created by: Talin Vartanian; Peter Kavanagh
- Original release: 2002 – present
- No. of series: 20
- Website: Canada Reads

Canada Reads is an annual "battle of the books" competition organized and broadcast by Canada's public broadcaster, the CBC. The program has aired in two distinct editions, the English-language Canada Reads on CBC Radio One, and the French-language Le Combat des livres on Ici Radio-Canada Première.

The English edition has aired each year since 2002, while the French edition aired annually from 2004 to 2014, and was then discontinued until being revived in 2018.

In 2021, sister service CBC Music launched Canada Listens, which used a similar format of advocates debating five classic albums by Canadian musicians. In 2023, CBC Kids introduced CBC Kids Reads, a feature which uses a similar format to highlight children's picture books.

== Overview ==
During Canada Reads, five personalities champion five different books, each champion extolling the merits of one of the titles. The debate is broadcast over a series of five programs. At the end of each episode, the panelists vote one title out of the competition until only one book remains. This book is then billed as the book that all of Canada should read.

CBC Radio producer Peter Kavanagh proposed the general idea of a national radio book campaign during the fall of 2001. Later that year, Talin Vartanian conceived Canada Reads and created the essential structure of the program: an annual campaign to select a book for the nation to read. She proposed the idea of five panelists, each championing a different title in a national on air debate. Vartanian was producer in the first edition (with Kavanagh), then she became executive producer from 2002 to 2007. In 2007 the program was an "All Star Edition", a reunion of the winning panelists from the first five years. From 2007 to 2017, Ann Jansen produced the program.

Canada Reads was first broadcast on the CBC's Radio One in 2002, and has aired annually on radio since then. The third and fourth editions also were broadcast on television, on CBC Newsworld. Broadcast dates were February 16 to February 20, 2004, and February 21 to February 25, 2005, respectively. The seventh edition was also broadcast on Bold TV, broadcasting from February 25 to February 29. Beginning with the third edition, the daily debates could be heard online as well as on Radio One. The fifth edition was broadcast from April 17 to April 21, 2006. The sixth edition aired February 25 to March 2, 2007. The seventh edition of Canada Reads was broadcast on February 25 to February 29, 2008, and for the first time, it was available as a podcast.

The books in the running for each edition of Canada Reads are announced several months before the programs are broadcast. Titles must be Canadian fiction, poetry or plays. They are promoted in bookstores, in the hope that the Canada Reads audience will purchase and read them all before the programs air. In some cases, publishers have published special editions of the nominated titles.

The publisher of the winning Canada Reads title donates a portion of sales proceeds from the winning book to a charitable organization working in the field of literacy. Recipients have included Frontier College, the Movement for Canadian Literacy, ABC Life Literacy Canada (formerly ABC CANADA Literacy Foundation) and Laubach Literacy of Canada.

Beginning in 2004, Radio-Canada, the French-language service of the CBC, produced a French version of Canada Reads entitled Le Combat des livres ("Battle of the books"). It was broadcast on Première Chaîne until 2014, following which it was discontinued for three years until being revived in 2018.

Both the English and French programs sometimes, but not always, include one personality more commonly associated with the other language community, who champions a translated work. One advocate, Maureen McTeer, has appeared on both programs in the same year, championing the same novel in both its original English and translated French editions. Several other novels have also been chosen for both programs, although their English and French versions were not chosen by the same advocate or in the same year; one novel to date, Lawrence Hill's The Book of Negroes (French title Aminata) has won both competitions.

== 2002 ==
Canada Reads 2002 aired from April 16 to 19, 2002. The winning title was announced on April 23, 2002, Canada Book Day. Mary Walsh was the moderator.

| Author | Title | Advocate |
|---|---|---|
| Michael Ondaatje | In the Skin of a Lion | Steven Page |
| Margaret Atwood | The Handmaid's Tale | Kim Campbell |
| George Elliott Clarke | Whylah Falls | Nalo Hopkinson |
| Margaret Laurence | The Stone Angel | Leon Rooke |
| Rohinton Mistry | A Fine Balance | Megan Follows |

== 2003 ==
Canada Reads 2003 aired from April 21 to 25, 2003. Bill Richardson was the moderator.

| Author | Title | Advocate |
|---|---|---|
| Hubert Aquin, translated by Sheila Fischman | Next Episode | Denise Bombardier |
| Paul Hiebert | Sarah Binks | Will Ferguson |
| Helen Humphreys | The Lost Garden | Mag Ruffman |
| Wayne Johnston | The Colony of Unrequited Dreams | Justin Trudeau |
| Yann Martel | Life of Pi | Nancy Lee |

== 2004 ==
Canada Reads 2004 aired on both CBC Radio and CBC Newsworld from February 16 to 20, 2004. Bill Richardson was the moderator.

| Author | Title | Advocate |
|---|---|---|
| Guy Vanderhaeghe | The Last Crossing | Jim Cuddy |
| Thomas King | Green Grass, Running Water | Glen Murray |
| Alice Munro | The Love of a Good Woman | Measha Brueggergosman |
| Monique Proulx, translated by David Homel and Fred A. Reed | The Heart Is an Involuntary Muscle | Francine Pelletier |
| Mordecai Richler | Barney's Version | Zsuzsi Gartner |

== 2005 ==
Canada Reads 2005 was broadcast from February 21 to 25, 2005. Bill Richardson was again the moderator.

| Author | Title | Advocate |
|---|---|---|
| Frank Parker Day | Rockbound | Donna Morrissey |
| Margaret Atwood | Oryx and Crake | Olivia Chow |
| Leonard Cohen | Beautiful Losers | Molly Johnson^{1} |
| Jacques Poulin, translated by Sheila Fischman | Volkswagen Blues | Roch Carrier |
| Mairuth Sarsfield | No Crystal Stair | Sherraine MacKay |
^{1}This title had been originally chosen by Rufus Wainwright, but was defended by Molly Johnson when Wainwright was unable to participate.

== 2006 ==
Canada Reads 2006 was broadcast from April 17 to 21, 2006. Bill Richardson was again the moderator.

| Author | Title | Advocate |
|---|---|---|
| Miriam Toews | A Complicated Kindness | John K. Samson |
| Joseph Boyden | Three Day Road | Nelofer Pazira |
| Frances Itani | Deafening | Maureen McTeer |
| Al Purdy | Rooms for Rent in the Outer Planets: Selected Poems, 1962-1996 | Susan Musgrave |
| Mordecai Richler | Cocksure | Scott Thompson |

== 2007 ==
Canada Reads 2007 aired from February 26 to March 2, 2007. Bill Richardson again moderated the competition. For the 2007 competition, each of the five winning advocates from past series returned to champion a new book in an "all-star" edition of the series.

| Author | Title | Advocate |
|---|---|---|
| Heather O'Neill | Lullabies for Little Criminals | John K. Samson |
| David Bezmozgis | Natasha and Other Stories | Steven Page |
| Anosh Irani | The Song of Kahunsha | Donna Morrissey |
| Gabrielle Roy, translated by Alan Brown | Children of My Heart | Denise Bombardier |
| Timothy Taylor | Stanley Park | Jim Cuddy |

== 2008 ==
Canada Reads 2008 aired from February 25 to 29, 2008. Jian Ghomeshi moderated the competition.

| Author | Title | Advocate |
|---|---|---|
| Paul Quarrington | King Leary | Dave Bidini |
| Timothy Findley | Not Wanted on the Voyage | Zaib Shaikh |
| Mavis Gallant | From the Fifteenth District | Lisa Moore |
| Nalo Hopkinson | Brown Girl in the Ring | Jemini |
| Thomas Wharton | Icefields | Steve MacLean |

== 2009 ==
Canada Reads 2009 aired from March 2 to 6, 2009. Jian Ghomeshi moderated the competition.

| Author | Title | Advocate |
|---|---|---|
| Lawrence Hill | The Book of Negroes | Avi Lewis |
| Gil Adamson | The Outlander | Nicholas Campbell |
| Brian Francis | Fruit | Jen Sookfong Lee |
| David Adams Richards | Mercy among the Children | Sarah Slean |
| Michel Tremblay, translated by Sheila Fischman | The Fat Woman Next Door Is Pregnant | Anne-Marie Withenshaw |

== 2010 ==
Canada Reads 2010 aired from March 8 to 12, 2010. Jian Ghomeshi moderated the competition.

| Author | Title | Advocate |
|---|---|---|
| Nicolas Dickner, translated by Lazer Lederhendler | Nikolski | Michel Vézina |
| Wayson Choy | The Jade Peony | Samantha Nutt |
| Douglas Coupland | Generation X: Tales for an Accelerated Culture | Cadence Weapon |
| Marina Endicott | Good to a Fault | Simi Sara |
| Ann-Marie MacDonald | Fall on Your Knees | Perdita Felicien |

== 2011 ==
Canada Reads 2011 aired from February 7 to 10, 2011. The producers announced a slightly different format for the 2011 contest. Throughout the month of October 2010, an online vote was held to determine the books that listeners consider the 40 "most essential" Canadian novels of the past decade, and the panelists made their choices from within that list. Only novels, not short story collections, were eligible; however, novels which have previously been included in a Canada Reads competition were still eligible for renomination.

| Author | Title | Advocate |
|---|---|---|
| Terry Fallis | The Best Laid Plans | Ali Velshi |
| Angie Abdou | The Bone Cage | Georges Laraque |
| Jeff Lemire | Essex County | Sara Quin |
| Ami McKay | The Birth House | Debbie Travis |
| Carol Shields | Unless | Lorne Cardinal |

== 2012 ==
The books for this edition were all non-fiction. A list of 40 non-fiction books were announced as being the shortlist finalists in October 2011, including And No Birds Sang by Farley Mowat, Shake Hands with the Devil by Romeo Dallaire, The Last Spike by Pierre Berton, The Death and Life of Great American Cities by Jane Jacobs and Paris 1919 by Margaret MacMillan. Listeners could vote on up to five books they wanted to be shortlisted. The debates aired from February 6 to 9, 2012. Jian Ghomeshi moderated the competition.

| Author | Title | Advocate |
|---|---|---|
| Carmen Aguirre | Something Fierce: Memoirs of a Revolutionary Daughter | Shad |
| Dave Bidini | On a Cold Road | Stacey McKenzie |
| Ken Dryden | The Game | Alan Thicke |
| Marina Nemat | Prisoner of Tehran | Arlene Dickinson |
| John Vaillant | The Tiger | Anne-France Goldwater |

On the first day of discussions, panelist Anne-France Goldwater "caused shock and outrage among literary types" (according to The Globe and Mail) by calling Carmen Aguirre "a bloody terrorist" and alleging that Marina Nemat "tells a story that's not true". In response, Marina Nemat posted on Facebook, "I hope [Goldwater] can produce evidence to back up her claims. If not, I would like to receive a public apology from her." Nemat's Prisoner of Tehran was the first voted off, with Stacey McKenzie casting a tie-breaking vote. Arlene Dickinson (the panelist defending Prisoner of Tehran) called McKenzie's vote "the wrong choice for the wrong reason".

== 2013 ==
The theme for 2013 was "Turf Wars", with the advocates and titles chosen to each represent one of Canada's major geographic regions (British Columbia, the Prairies, Ontario, Quebec and the Atlantic provinces). The books and panelists for 2013 were revealed on November 29, 2012, on Q. The debates ran from February 11 to 14, 2013.

| Author | Title | Advocate |
|---|---|---|
| Lisa Moore | February | Trent McClellan |
| David Bergen | The Age of Hope | Ron MacLean |
| Hugh MacLennan | Two Solitudes | Jay Baruchel |
| Jane Urquhart | Away | Charlotte Gray |
| Richard Wagamese | Indian Horse | Carol Huynh |

== 2014 ==
The theme for this year was "A Novel to Change Our Nation." Books and panelists were revealed on November 27, 2013, on Q. Jian Ghomeshi moderated the competition.

| Author | Title | Advocate |
|---|---|---|
| Joseph Boyden | The Orenda, debated theme: First Nations, environment | Wab Kinew |
| Margaret Atwood | The Year of the Flood, debated theme: environment | Stephen Lewis |
| Esi Edugyan | Half-Blood Blues, debated theme: racial inequality | Donovan Bailey |
| Rawi Hage | Cockroach, debated theme: immigrant experience | Samantha Bee |
| Kathleen Winter | Annabel, debated theme: gender equality | Sarah Gadon |

== 2015 ==
The 2015 edition of Canada Reads was moderated by Wab Kinew, with the theme of the discussions being "One Book to Break Barriers". The panelists and titles were announced on January 20, 2015, with the debates taking place from March 16 to 19.

| Author | Title | Advocate |
|---|---|---|
| Kim Thúy, translated by Sheila Fischman | Ru | Cameron Bailey |
| Kamal Al-Solaylee | Intolerable: A Memoir of Extremes | Kristin Kreuk |
| Thomas King | The Inconvenient Indian | Craig Kielburger |
| Raziel Reid | When Everything Feels Like the Movies | Elaine Lui |
| Jocelyne Saucier, translated by Rhonda Mullins | And the Birds Rained Down | Martha Wainwright |

== 2016 ==
The 2016 edition of Canada Reads was moderated by Gill Deacon, and conducted on theme of "Starting Over". Panelists and titles were announced on January 20, 2016, with the debates taking place from March 21 to 24.

| Author | Title | Advocate |
|---|---|---|
| Lawrence Hill | The Illegal | Clara Hughes |
| Anita Rau Badami | The Hero's Walk | Vinay Virmani |
| Tracey Lindberg | Birdie | Bruce Poon Tip |
| Saleema Nawaz | Bone and Bread | Farah Mohamed |
| Michael Winter | Minister Without Portfolio | Adam Copeland |

== 2017 ==
The 2017 edition of Canada Reads was moderated by Ali Hassan, on the theme of "The Book Canadians Need Now". Panelists and titles were announced on January 31, 2017, and the debates took place from March 27 to 30.

| Author | Title | Advocate |
|---|---|---|
| André Alexis | Fifteen Dogs | Humble The Poet |
| Madeline Ashby | Company Town | Measha Brueggergosman |
| M. G. Vassanji | Nostalgia | Jody Mitic |
| Katherena Vermette | The Break | Candy Palmater |
| Sheila Watt-Cloutier | The Right to Be Cold | Chantal Kreviazuk |

Note: Tamara Taylor was originally announced as advocate for Company Town but had to withdraw due to a conflict with the filming schedule of her Netflix series Altered Carbon. Measha Brueggergosman was announced as Taylor's replacement on March 9, 2017.

== 2018 ==
The 2018 edition of Canada Reads was moderated by Ali Hassan, on the theme of "One Book to Open Your Eyes". Panelists and titles were announced on January 30, 2018, and the debates took place from March 26 to 29.

| Author | Title | Advocate |
|---|---|---|
| Mark Sakamoto | Forgiveness: A Gift from My Grandparents | Jeanne Beker |
| Sharon Bala | The Boat People | Mozhdah Jamalzadah |
| Craig Davidson | Precious Cargo: My Year of Driving the Kids on School Bus 3077 | Greg Johnson |
| Cherie Dimaline | The Marrow Thieves | Jully Black |
| Omar El Akkad | American War | Tahmoh Penikett |

== 2019 ==
The 2019 edition of Canada Reads was moderated by Ali Hassan on the theme "One Book to Move You". The books and panelists were announced on January 31, 2019, with the debates taking place from March 25 to 28.

| Author | Title | Advocate |
|---|---|---|
| Max Eisen | By Chance Alone | Ziya Tong |
| Abu Bakr Al-Rabeeah and Winnie Yeung | Homes | Chuck Comeau |
| Anaïs Barbeau-Lavalette, translated by Rhonda Mullins | Suzanne | Yanic Truesdale |
| David Chariandy | Brother | Lisa Ray |
| Lindsay Wong | The Woo-Woo | Joe Zee |

== 2020 ==
The 2020 edition of Canada Reads was moderated by Ali Hassan on the theme "One Book to Bring Canada into Focus". The books and panelists were announced on January 22, 2020. The debates were originally slated to take place from March 16 to 19; however, as the debates normally take place in a theatre in front of a live audience, they were postponed to a later date in light of the COVID-19 pandemic in Canada. In the interim, the CBC produced a series of five specials, one profiling each of the five nominated books through interviews with both the writer and the advocate, to air in place of the original debates.

In July, it was announced that the debates would take place in the week of July 20 to 23.

| Author | Title | Advocate |
|---|---|---|
| Samra Habib | We Have Always Been Here | Amanda Brugel |
| Megan Gail Coles | Small Game Hunting at the Local Coward Gun Club | Alayna Fender |
| Cory Doctorow | Radicalized | Akil Augustine |
| Eden Robinson | Son of a Trickster | Kaniehtiio Horn |
| Jesse Thistle | From the Ashes | George Canyon |

== 2021 ==
The 2021 debates took place in the week of March 8 to 11, 2021, moderated by Ali Hassan on the theme of "One Book to Transport Us".

| Author | Title | Advocate |
|---|---|---|
| Joshua Whitehead | Jonny Appleseed | Kawennáhere Devery Jacobs |
| Francesca Ekwuyasi | Butter Honey Pig Bread | Roger Mooking |
| Jessica J. Lee | Two Trees Make a Forest | Scott Helman |
| C. L. Polk | The Midnight Bargain | Rosey Edeh |
| Natalie Zina Walschots | Hench | Paul Sun-Hyung Lee |

=== Canada Listens ===
Also in 2021, CBC Music announced Canada Listens, a debate which applied the Canada Reads format to five albums by Canadian musicians. Hosted by Saroja Coelho and broadcast on Mornings, the Canada Listens debates took place in the week of April 12 to 15.

| Artist | Album | Advocate |
|---|---|---|
| Kardinal Offishall | Quest for Fire: Firestarter, Vol. 1 | Kathleen Newman-Bremang |
| Daniel Caesar | Freudian | Miguel Rivas |
| k-os | Joyful Rebellion | Andrew Phung |
| Buffy Sainte-Marie | Illuminations | Carolyn Taylor |
| Tegan and Sara | The Con | Alicia Elliott |

== 2022 ==
The 2022 debates took place during the week of March 28 to 31, 2022, moderated by Ali Hassan on the theme of "One Book to Connect Us".

| Author | Title | Advocate |
|---|---|---|
| Michelle Good | Five Little Indians | Christian Allaire |
| Esi Edugyan | Washington Black | Mark Tewksbury |
| Omar El Akkad | What Strange Paradise | Tareq Hadhad |
| Catherine Hernandez | Scarborough | Malia Baker |
| Clayton Thomas-Müller | Life in the City of Dirty Water | Suzanne Simard |

=== Canada Listens ===
The second Canada Listens debates were hosted by Saroja Coelho on CBC Music's Mornings from April 11 to April 14. It resulted in the first tie in the history of the Canada Reads franchise, with two albums jointly winning the final vote.

| Artist | Album | Advocate |
|---|---|---|
| Crown Lands | Crown Lands | Erica Violet Lee |
| Mustafa | When Smoke Rises | Dave Merheje |
| Bruce Cockburn | Further Adventures Of | Les Stroud |
| jacksoul | Sleepless | Kim Roberts |
| Ria Mae | Ria Mae | Stephanie Labbé |

== 2023 ==
The 2023 debates took place from March 27 to March 30, moderated by Ali Hassan on the theme of "One Book to Shift Your Perspective".

| Author | Title | Advocate |
|---|---|---|
| Kate Beaton | Ducks: Two Years in the Oil Sands | Mattea Roach |
| Michael Christie | Greenwood | Keegan Connor Tracy |
| Emily St. John Mandel | Station Eleven | Michael Greyeyes |
| Silvia Moreno-Garcia | Mexican Gothic | Tasnim Geedi |
| Dimitri Nasrallah | Hotline | Gurdeep Pandher |

=== CBC Kids Reads ===
Also in 2023, CBC Kids announced CBC Kids Reads, a junior edition of the franchise which focused on illustrated books for younger readers. Unlike the original iteration of Canada Reads, CBC Kids Reads did not have a winner, but selected titles recognized for significant interest for younger readers. The program aired on CBC Kids from March 27 - 30, 2023 and celebrated six books, advocated by the hosts of CBC Kids morning programs.

| Author | Title | Advocate |
|---|---|---|
| Jeffrey Ansloos and Shezza Ansloos, illustrated by Joshua Mangeshig Pawis-Steckley | Thunder and the Noise Storms | Tony Kim |
| Karen Autio, illustrated by Laura Watson | I Can, Too! | Gary the Unicorn |
| Kuljinder Kaur Brar, illustrated by Samrath Kaur | My Name is Saajin Singh | Mr. Orlando |
| Aviaq Johnston, illustrated by Tim Mack | What's My Superpower? | Cottonball |
| Ella Russell, illustrated by Udayana Lugo | Pink is for Everybody | Makeup Monster |
| Tasha Spillett-Sumner, illustrated by Salini Perera | Beautiful You, Beautiful Me | Janaye Upshaw |

== 2024 ==
The 2024 debates took place from March 4 to March 7, moderated by Ali Hassan on the theme of the "One Book to Carry Us Forward." Heather O'Neill became the first person to participate and to win Canada Reads as both an author, after her novel Lullabies for Little Criminals won in 2007, and as an advocate, for championing The Future by Catherine Leroux, in the 2024 edition of the competition.

| Author | Title | Advocate |
|---|---|---|
| Catherine Leroux, translated by Susan Ouriou | The Future | Heather O'Neill |
| Carley Fortune | Meet Me at the Lake | Mirian Njoh |
| Jessica Johns | Bad Cree | Dallas Soonias |
| Téa Mutonji | Shut Up You're Pretty | Kudakwashe Rutendo |
| Christina Wong and Daniel Innes | Denison Avenue | Naheed Nenshi |

=== CBC Kids Reads ===
A second edition of CBC Kids Reads was announced, celebrating six illustrated books for younger readers. The hosts of CBC Kids returned as advocates. In contrast to the previous edition, a winner was announced among the featured titles on March 7, 2024.

| Author | Title | Advocate |
|---|---|---|
| Sylv Chiang, illustrated by Mathias Ball | Still My Tessa | Gary the Unicorn |
| Dallas Hunt, illustrated by Amanda Strong | Awâsis and the World-Famous Bannock | Tony |
| Aija Aiofe Komangapik | My Hood's Not Big Enough | Janaye |
| Roz Maclean | More Than Words | Cottonball |
| Sakshi Mangal | Asha and the Toymaker | Mosey |
| Sal Sawler, illustrated by Emma FitzGerald | When the Ocean Came to Town | Mr. Orlando |

== 2025 ==
The 2025 edition took place from March 17 to 20, on the theme of "books that change how we see, share and experience the world around us", with Ali Hassan as the moderator. The competing titles and advocates were announced on January 23.

| Author | Title | Advocate |
|---|---|---|
| Ma-Nee Chacaby and Mary Louisa Plummer | A Two-Spirit Journey | Shayla Stonechild |
| Samantha M. Bailey | Watch Out for Her | Maggie Mac Neil |
| Emma Hooper | Etta and Otto and Russell and James | Michelle Morgan |
| Wayne Johnston | Jennie's Boy | Linwood Barclay |
| Jamie Chai Yun Liew | Dandelion | Saïd M'Dahoma |

=== CBC Kids Reads ===
A third edition of CBC Kids Reads was announced, highlighting five illustrated books for younger readers. The books were championed by the hosts of CBC Kids, alongside a celebrity advocate. The winner was announced among the featured titles on October 4, 2025.

| Author | Title | Advocates |
|---|---|---|
| Janie Hao | Mad at Dad | Gary the Unicorn and Andrew Phung |
| Sarah Howden, illustrated by Carmen Mok | Cone Dog | Stuffy the Dog and Jay Baruchel |
| Ashley Qilavaq-Savard, illustrated by Pelin Turgut | I am a Rock | Mosey Monster and Anna Lambe |
| Karl Subban, illustrated by Maggie Zeng | The Hockey Skates | Cottonball the Cat and Kayla Grey |
| Gillian Sze, illustrated by Claudine Crangle | The Little Green Envelope | Mr. Orlando the Moose and Josh Dela Cruz |

== 2026 ==
The 2026 edition took place from April 13 to 16, on the theme of "one book to build bridges", with Ali Hassan as the moderator. The competing titles and advocates were announced on January 22. The winner was announced on April 16, 2026.

| Author | Title | Advocate |
|---|---|---|
| Loghan Paylor | The Cure for Drowning | Tegan Quin |
| Billy-Ray Belcourt | A Minor Chorus | Elle-Máijá Tailfeathers |
| Tyler Hellard | Searching for Terry Punchout | Steve "Dangle" Glynn |
| Iain Reid | Foe | Josh Dela Cruz |
| Joss Richard | It's Different This Time | Morgann Book |

=== CBC Kids Reads ===
CBC Kids Reads will return in 2026, with the winner set to be announced on October 19th. A longlist of 15 illustrated books was released, and a shortlist of five books. The winner was announced on October 19, 2026.

| Author | Title |
|---|---|
| Melanie Florence, illustrated by Nadia Alam | Sarabeth's Garage |
| Sophia Robinson, illustrated by Ken Daley | Beautiful Black Boy |
| Susan Sweet, illustrated by Cailin Doherty | I Need Pants! |
| Hala Tahboub | The Interrupted Plans of Mango and Nan |
| Stephanie Ellen Sy, illustrated by Julien Chung | You Can't Tame a Tiger |

== Success ==
As a vehicle to promote interest in reading and books and to increase sales, Canada Reads has been a signal success. Even already successful titles see increases in sales driven by their inclusion in the contest: sales of Michael Ondaatje's In the Skin of a Lion increased by 80,000 in 2002, the year of its appearance on Canada Reads. Its publisher, Random House of Canada attributed much of this increase to Canada Reads.

The success for lesser known titles can be as marked. Hubert Aquin's Next Episode sold 18,500 copies in the year when it won Canada Reads.

For the 2005 edition, sales of Jacques Poulin's Volkswagen Blues, which usually are about 200 copies a year, increased to 7,500 between the time the nominations were announced and the shows began airing. During the same period, 7,000 copies of Frank Parker Day's Rockbound were shipped by its publisher, the University of Toronto Press.

Various community groups have also created local events that highlight the Canada Reads shortlist; for instance, the Greater Sudbury Public Library in Sudbury has staged several editions of "Sudbury Reads", an event where members of the community discuss and debate that year's Canada Reads titles to arrive at a selection of the city's own favourite Canada Reads book.

== Criticism ==
There has been some criticism of Canada Reads. First, criticism has been made of the use of "celebrity" panelists. In 2007, a listener named John Mutford unsuccessfully attempted to become the first non-celebrity panelist. Critics have also taken issue with the game show format, and have contended that discussion of the books has often remained on a superficial level.

The choice of books has also been criticized. Originally each panelist provided a list of five books, from which the producers chose the final contenders. In 2005, this process changed, and each panelist submitted only one choice. Due to scheduling problems, Rufus Wainwright was not able to appear after selecting his choice, and singer Molly Johnson was chosen to defend his chosen book.
