= Peter Kavanagh =

Peter Kavanagh may refer to:

- Peter Kavanagh (footballer) (1910–1993), Irish footballer
- Peter Kavanagh (writer) (1916–2006), writer, scholar, and publisher
- Peter Kavanagh (politician) (born 1959), Australian politician and legal academic
- Peter Kavanagh, a fictional character from Stargate Atlantis
- Peter Kavanagh (producer) (1953–2016), Canadian radio producer, creator of Canada Reads
- Peter Cavanagh (born 1981), English footballer for Liverpool and Accrington Stanley
- Peter Cavanagh (impressionist) (1914–1981), English comic impressionist
- Peter Cavanaugh, DJ and radio station manager
