= Scott Helman =

Canadian singer-songwriter from Toronto (born 1995)

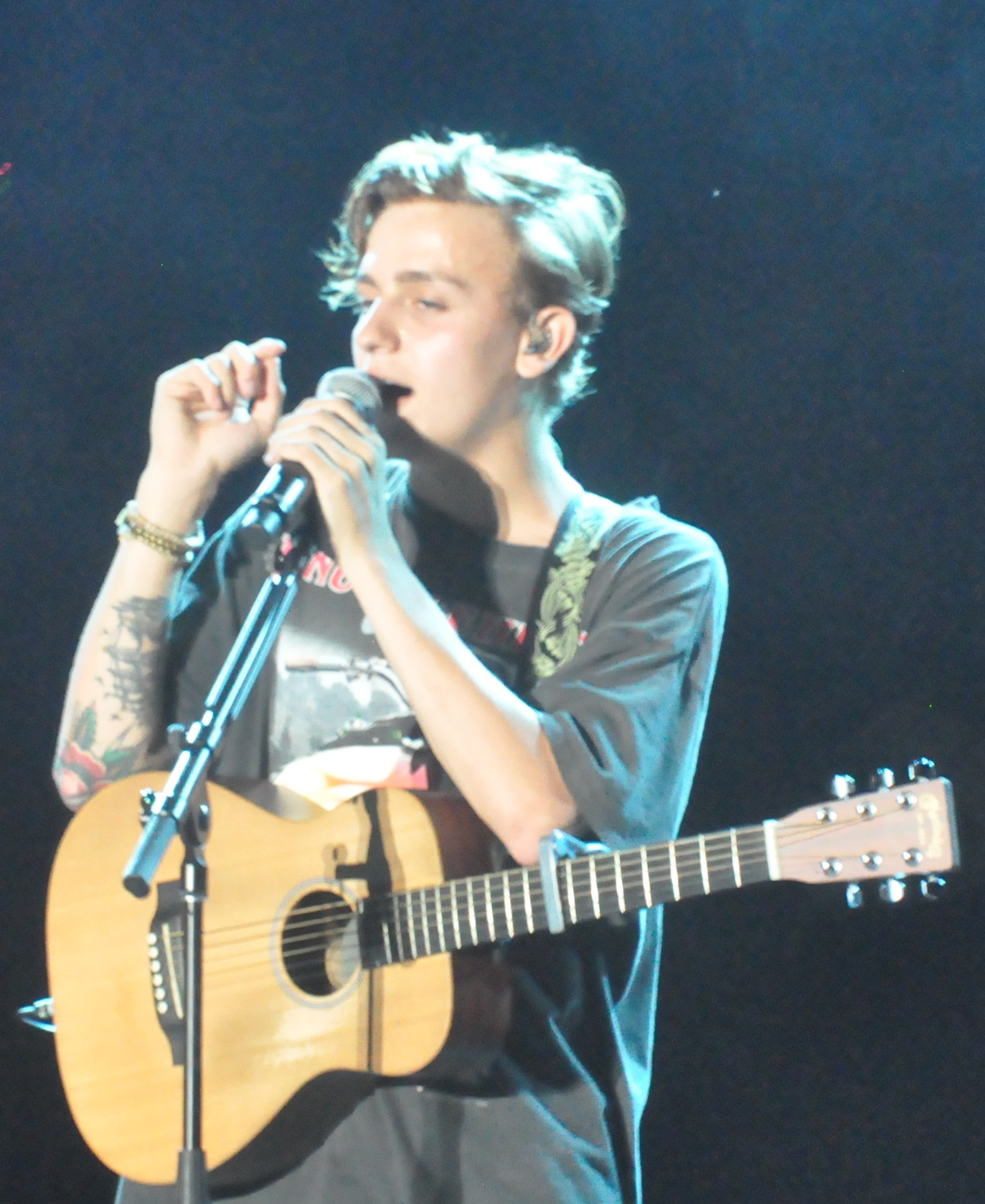

Background information
- Born: October 1, 1995 (age 31)
- Origin: Toronto, Ontario, Canada
- Years active: 2014–present
- Label: formerly: Warner Music Canada
- Website: scotthelmanmusic.com

Scott Helman (born October 1, 1995) is a Canadian singer-songwriter from Toronto. He released his debut EP Augusta in 2014, followed by Spotify Sessions in 2016 and Hang Ups in 2018. His album Hôtel de Ville was released in 2017 by Warner Music Canada.

== Early life ==
Born and raised in a Jewish family in Toronto, Helman graduated in 2013 from Earl Haig Secondary School. He says his parents were very supportive of his music career. He got a guitar for his 10th birthday, and stated that by the time he was 14 he wanted to be a professional musician. At 15 years old, he signed a development deal with Warner Music Canada, where he began writing sessions with writers such as Simon Wilcox and Thomas "Tawgs" Salter.

== Career ==
In 2014, Helman announced the release of the track "Bungalow" as the first single from his debut EP Augusta. He later toured with Tegan and Sara, Shawn Mendes, Walk Off the Earth, and Vance Joy.

Since the May 2017 release of his full-length album Hôtel De Ville, Helman has toured and released the singles “Kinda Complicated,” “Ripple Effect,” and the gold-certified "PDA".

In February 2018, as part of CBC Music's Junos 365 Sessions, Helman performed the Tragically Hip's song "Bobcaygeon" as a tribute to Gord Downie.

In mid-2018, Helman was invited to open for Vance Joy's five Canadian tour dates and his European tour. In advance of the European tour, Helman released "Hang Ups," followed by a remix featuring Spanish singer Blas Cantó.

In 2019, Helman toured the United States, opening for Dean Lewis.

In 2020, Helman released his second album NonSuch Park (SA). He also talks about his grandfather's inspiration on his album.

In 2021, Helman was a panelist for Canada Reads, an annual "battle of the books" competition, defending Two Trees Make a Forest by Jessica J Lee in a series of debates that took place on CBC radio.

In 2024, Helman formed his own independent label, Fo Fum Records, and released the EP Augusta 10, a tenth anniversary celebration release of his 2014 EP. The single "Somewhere Sweet", a long-time fan favourite in concert, featured a music video directed by Ben Knechtel.

In 2026, Helman announced the release of a new single, "Faith in Humanity", with his third album to be titled Pipsqueak. He followed it up with "Mr. Record Label", a true-to-life satire about being signed to a major label record deal.

== Tours ==
- U.S Tour - Supporting Walk Off The Earth - 2015
- European Tour - Supporting Walk Off The Earth - 2015
- Canadian Tour - Supporting Matthew Good - 2015
- Canadian Tour - Scott Vs. Ria - 2017
- Canadian & European Tour - Vance Joy
- Canadian Tour - The Hang Ups - 2019
- North American Tour - Supporting Dean Lewis - 2019
- Canadian Tour - CP Train - 2019
- Back Together Tour - Canada 2023
- Augusta 10 Tour - Canada 2024

== Awards and nominations ==
Year	Award	Category	Nominee/work	Result	Ref
2016	Juno Awards	Breakthrough Artist of the Year	Scott Helman	Nominated	
2016	Juno Awards	Pop Album of the Year	Augusta	Nominated	
2018	Juno Awards	Songwriter of the Year	"21 Days", "It's Kinda Complicated", "PDA"	Nominated	
2018	Juno Awards	Pop Album of the Year	Hôtel de Ville	Nominated	
2019	Juno Awards	Video of the Year	"Hang Ups"	Nominated	
2020	Juno Awards	Single of the Year	"Hang Ups"	Nominated	
2021	Juno Awards	Video of the Year	"Wait No More"	Nominated	

== Discography ==
=== Studio albums ===
List of studio albums, with selected chart positions
Title	Album details	Peak chart positions
Title	Album details	CAN
Hôtel de Ville	Released: 12 May 2017; Label: Warner Music Canada; Formats: LP, CD, digital download	45
Nonsuch Park (SA)	Released: 4 September 2020; Label: Warner Music Canada; Formats: digital download	—
"—" denotes a recording that did not chart.

=== EPs ===
List of EPs
Title	EP details
Songs for Friends EP	Released: 24 June 2014; Label: Warner Music Canada; Formats: digital download
Augusta	Released: 14 October 2014; Label: Warner Music Canada; Formats: EP, CD, digital download
Spotify Sessions	Released: 6 May 2016; Label: Warner Music Canada; Formats: streaming
Hang Ups	Released: 19 October 2018; Label: Warner Music Canada; Formats: digital download
Augusta 10	Released 14 October 2024; Label: Fo Fum Records; Formats: digital download

=== Singles ===
List of singles, with selected chart positions and certifications, showing year released and album name
Title	Year	Peak chart positions							Certifications	Album / EP
Title	Year	CAN	CAN All-Format	CAN AC	CAN CHR/ Top 40	CAN Hot AC	CAN Rock	BE (FL) Tip	Certifications	Album / EP
"Bungalow"	2014	31	14	10	21	11	27	—	MC: Platinum	Augusta
"Machine"	2015	—	—	36	—	37	—	—		Augusta
"That Sweater"	2015	—	—	—	45	38	—	—		Augusta
"21 Days"	2017	—	—	—	—	—	—	—		Hôtel de Ville
"Kinda Complicated"	2017	85	10	7	19	5	—	—	MC: Gold	Hôtel de Ville
"PDA"	2017	83	11	8	17	6	—	4	MC: Platinum	Hôtel de Ville
"Ripple Effect"	2018	—	—	32	—	33	—	44	MC: Gold	Hôtel de Ville
"Hang Ups"	2018	51	9	2	18	5	—	—	MC: Platinum	Hang Ups
"Everything Sucks"	2019	—	28	—	26	14	—	—		Nonsuch Park (SA)
"Evergreen"	2019	—	—	—	—	—	—	—		Nonsuch Park (SA)
"Wait No More"	2020	76	17	7	23	8	—	—	MC: Gold	Nonsuch Park (SA)
"Papa"	2020	—	—	—	—	—	—	—		Nonsuch Park (SA)
"Lois"	2020	—	—	—	—	—	—	—		Nonsuch Park (SA)
"Coming Home (For Christmas)"	2020	—	—	—	—	—	—	—		Non-album single
"Good Problems"	2021	—	—	—	—	—	—	—		Nonsuch Park (SA)
"Old Friends"	2021	—	—	—	—	—	—	—		Non-album singles
"Pretty"	2021	—	—	—	37	—	—	—		Non-album singles
"Where the Sidewalk Ends" (with Gnash)	2022	—	—	—	—	—	—	—		Non-album singles
"Drive"	2023	—	—	—	—	—	—	—		Non-album singles
"Back Together"	2023	—	—	—	—	—	—	—		Non-album singles
"Every Time (Drive By)"	2023	—	—	18	—	38	—	—		Non-album singles
"Chuck Taylors"	2023	—	—	—	—	—	—	—		Non-album singles
"Collarbone"	2023	—	—	—	—	—	—	—		Non-album singles
"Somewhere Sweet"	2024	—	—	—	—	—	—	—		Augusta 10
"Machine" (2024 version)	2024	—	—	—	—	—	—	—		Augusta 10
"Machine" (with Wild Rivers)	2024	—	—	—	—	—	—	—		Non-album singles
"Something About Julien"	2025	—	—	—	—	—	—	—		Non-album singles
"Faith in Humanity"	2026	—	—	—	—	—	—	—		Non-album singles
"Mr. Record Label"	2026	—	—	—	—	—	—	—		Non-album singles
"—" denotes a recording that did not chart.

=== Other appearances ===
List of other appearances, showing year released and album
Song	Year	Album
"Jockey Full of Bourbon"	2015	Sounds of the 80s
"Hand in My Pocket"	2017	Covered in Gold: 5.0, Side A
"Happy Hanukkah" (Walk Off the Earth featuring Scott Helman)	2018	Subscribe to the Holidays
"Lean on Me" (as part of ArtistsCAN)	2020	Non-album single
"Lovesong" (with Jann Arden)	2020	Hits and Other Gems

=== 'The Hotel Sessions' Youtube Series ===
List of Episodes
Episode Title	Video Details
Scott Helman - The Hotel Sessions Episode 1: Feel It Still	Released: 3 July 2018
Scott Helman - The Hotel Sessions Episode 2: Go Your Own Way (Feat. Deanna Petcoff)	Released: 1 August 2018
Scott Helman x Alessia Cara - The Hotel Sessions Ep 4: I Wanna Dance With Somebody (Whitney Houston)	Released: 30 January 2019
Scott Helman x Jann Arden - The Hotel Sessions Ep 5: Lovesong (The Cure)	Released: 3 April 2019
Scott Helman x Johnny Orlando - The Hotel Sessions Ep 6: Bury A Friend (Billie Eilish)	Released: 1 May 2019
Scott Helman x Hunter Hayes - The Hotel Sessions Ep 7 : It’s Not Living (The 1975)	Released: 13 September 2019
Scott Helman x Ria Mae - The Hotel Sessions Ep 8: 3 Nights (Dominic Fike)	Released: 27 January 2020
Scott Helman x Valley The Hotel Sessions Ep 9: Golf On TV (Lennon Stella f/JP Saxe)	Released: 9 April 2020
Scott Helman x The Reklaws The Hotel Sessions Ep 10: Mood (24kGoldn f/Iann Dior)	Released: 21 January 2021
