= Wayson Choy =

Canadian novelist (1939–2019)

Wayson Choy CM
- Born: Choy Way Sun; April 20, 1939; Vancouver, British Columbia, Canada
- Died: April 28, 2019 (aged 80); Toronto, Ontario, Canada
- Education: University of British Columbia
- Occupation: Novelist
- Notable work: The Jade Peony (1995); Paper Shadows (1999); All That Matters (2004); Not Yet (2009)
- Awards: Trillium Book Award (English) (1995, 2004); City of Vancouver Book Award (1996); Edna Staebler Award (2000)

Wayson Choy (崔維新 Pinyin: Cuī Wéixīn; Jyutping: Ceoi1 Wai4-san1) (April 20, 1939 – April 28, 2019) was a Canadian novelist. Publishing two novels and two memoirs in his lifetime, he is considered one of the most important pioneers of Asian Canadian literature in Canada, and as an important figure in LGBT literature as one of Canada's first openly gay writers of colour to achieve widespread mainstream success.

== Personal life and education ==
Choy, whose birth name was Choy Way Sun, was born in Vancouver on April 20, 1939, and was adopted by parents Toy and Lilly. A Chinese Canadian, he spent his childhood in the city's Chinatown.

He graduated from Gladstone Secondary School and went on to attend the University of British Columbia, where he studied creative writing. He was the first Chinese-Canadian student accepted into the program.

He learned later in life that he had been adopted, which formed part of the basis for his memoir Paper Shadows.

In 2001, Choy suffered an asthma attack, which led to him being placed in a medically induced coma for 11 days during which he also suffered cardiac arrest. He remained in hospital for four months to recuperate and recover with physiotherapy. In 2005, he had a second heart attack, and underwent quadruple bypass surgery.

In 2010, Wilfrid Laurier University presented Choy with an honorary Doctorate of Literature.

== Career ==
Choy published a number of short stories while studying creative writing at the University of British Columbia, with one of his stories appearing in the annual Best American Short Stories anthology, but after graduating he devoted himself primarily to teaching, resuming writing only later in life. Choy moved to Toronto in 1962, where he taught English at Burnhamthorpe Collegiate (1966–1967), then at Humber College from 1967 to 2004. He continued to teach at the Humber School for Writers, and served as president of the Cahoots Theatre Company.

Choy published his first novel, The Jade Peony in 1995. It won the Trillium Book Award and the City of Vancouver Book Award. In 2010, it was selected as one of five books for the CBC's annual Canada Reads competition, where it was defended by physician Samantha Nutt.

His first memoir, Paper Shadows: A Chinatown Childhood, was published in 1999. Written about his childhood within the Chinese Canadian community in Vancouver, the book explores both his discovery that he was adopted and his process of coming to terms with being gay. It won the Edna Staebler Award for Creative Non-Fiction, and was shortlisted for the Governor General's Award for English-language non-fiction at the 1999 Governor General's Awards.

His second novel, All That Matters, was published in 2004 and was nominated for the Scotiabank Giller Prize. All That Matters won Choy's second Trillium Book Award in 2004.

In 2005, he was named a member of the Order of Canada.

In 2009, Choy published Not Yet: A Memoir of Living and Almost Dying, his second and final memoir about dealing with the life-threatening health challenges.

In 2015, he received the George Woodcock Award, the lifetime achievement award for writers from British Columbia presented by the Writers' Trust of Canada and the Vancouver Public Library.

Three recently published monographs have featured chapters on Choy's publications up to Not Yet; these are: John Z. Ming Chen's The Influence of Daoism on Asian-Canadian Writers (Mellen, 2008), John Z. Ming Chen and Wei Li's A Study of Canadian Social Realist Literature: Neo-Marxist, Confucian, and Daoist Approaches (Inner Mongolia University Press, 2011), John Z. Ming Chen and Yuhua Ji's Canadian-Daoist Poetics, Ethics, and Aesthetics (Springer, 2015).

== Awards and honours ==
Choy was named a Member of the Order of Canada in 2005. In 2015, he received the George Woodcock Award, a lifetime achievement award for writers from British Columbia presented by the Writers' Trust of Canada and the Vancouver Public Library. Three years later, the City of Vancouver recognized him with their Civic Merit Award.

In 1999, The Globe and Mail named Paper Shadows among the year's noteworthy books.

In 2010, The Jade Peony was selected as one of five books for the CBC's annual Canada Reads competition, where it was defended by physician Samantha Nutt, founder of War Child.

In 2012, Project Bookmark Canada presented two plaques in Vancouver's Chinatown with excepts from The Jade Peony written in both English and Mandarin.

Awards for Choy's writing
Year	Title	Award	Result	Ref.
1995	The Jade Peony	Trillium Book Award (English)	Winner	
1996	The Jade Peony	City of Vancouver Book Award	Winner	
1999	Paper Shadows	Governor General's Award for English-language non-fiction	Shortlist	
2000	Paper Shadows	City of Vancouver Book Award	Finalist	
2000	Paper Shadows	Edna Staebler Award	Winner	
2004	All That Matters	Trillium Book Award (English)	Winner	
2004	All That Matters	Scotiabank Giller Prize	Shortlist	
2005	All That Matters	City of Vancouver Book Award	Finalist	

== Publications ==
=== Novels ===
- The Jade Peony – 1995
- All That Matters – 2004

=== Memoirs ===
- Paper Shadows: A Chinatown Childhood – 1999
- Not Yet: A Memoir of Living and Almost Dying – 2009 ISBN 978-0-385-66310-6
