= The Jade Peony =

Book by Wayson Choy

- Author: Wayson Choy
- Cover artist: Jessica Sullivan
- Language: English
- Publication date: 1995
- Publication place: Canada
- ISBN: 978-1-55054-468-8
- OCLC: 35138410
- Followed by: All That Matters

The Jade Peony is a novel by Wayson Choy. It was first published in 1995 by Douglas and McIntyre.

The novel features stories told by three siblings, Jook-Liang, Jung-Sum and Sek-Lung (or Sekky). Each child tells their own unique story, revealing their personal flaws and differences.

Set in Vancouver's Chinatown, the novel takes place during the 1930s and 1940s and among other events, explores the ways in which the Chinese and majority of Canadians once viewed the Japanese, especially during Japan's occupation of China during the Second World War and in the events following Pearl Harbor.

Other issues dealt with in this novel include the sense of belonging to a nation, and how young children of immigrants felt at this time, trying to find their identity when they were alien residents in Canada, but were not born in the same country as their parents were. They work to find their identity as Chinese Canadians, and find ways to either embrace being Canadian, or keep the Old China ways alive. This issue becomes especially important in the wake of their grandmother (called Poh-Poh or the Old One)'s death.

== Plot synopsis ==
The Jade Peony is divided into three sections, with a different child of the Chen family narrating his or her experience growing up in Vancouver's Chinatown in the early 1930–40s. Throughout the novel, the children's grandmother and family matriarch, Poh-Poh or Grandmama (the "Old One"), influences them with her own life experience and passes to them their cultural heritage of the "old ways" of China that they must maintain and balance with assimilating into the new world culture. The story is told from the perspectives of Jook-Liang or "Liang-Liang", followed by Jung Sum, and finally Sek-Lung or "Sekky".

=== Jook-Liang, Only Sister ===
The first section is narrated by Jook-Liang, the only sister in the family and the first child born to Father and Stepmother in Canada. She wishes to be a performer like Shirley Temple and forms an unlikely friendship with Wong Suk, an elderly man who is a family friend to the Chens. As the only daughter in the family, Liang struggles against her dreams of fame and escaping the old ways of her family, as well as the old Chinese convention of placing boys before girls. Her story concludes with Wong Suk returning to China to repatriate the remains of Chinese men who died in Canada but had wished to return home to China.

=== Jung-Sum, Second Brother ===
Jung-Sum, the second son, narrates the second section of the novel. Adopted into the Chen family after his birth parents died, he is hesitant to accept his new family after enduring neglect and abuse at the hands of his biological parents. However, he finds a sense of belonging with his new family as they welcome him with kind yet subtle gestures. Jung-Sum constantly seeks approval by attempting to prove himself to his family and his peers. Furthermore, he struggles with his sexuality and feelings for Frank, an older boy who has lost his parents, in a way that is somewhat similar to Jung-Sum's situation. He and Jung-Sum bond as he mentors Jung-Sum in boxing.

=== Sek-Lung, Third Brother ===
Sek-Lung, or Sekky, the third son, is the youngest child of the Chen family and the second child born to Father and Stepmother. Because he tended to be sickly, he becomes close to Poh-Poh, who spends most of her time taking care of him. Poh-Poh, being the only one who accompanies him, forms a close bond with Sekky. When she passes away, he becomes obsessed with the war games that have emerged with the impending Second World War and finds his world increasingly confusing when his babysitter, Meiying, begins an illicit relationship with a Japanese boy.

== Sequel ==
All That Matters is a sequel to The Jade Peony. It tells the story of the three siblings' eldest brother, Kiam-Kim, with a number of events running concurrent to The Jade Peony.

== Reception ==
The Jade Peony was the winner of the 1995 Trillium Prize and the 1995 City of Vancouver Book Award.

The book was selected for the 2010 edition of Canada Reads, where it was championed by academic and activist Samantha Nutt, but did not win. In 2002, The Jade Peony was also selected as the inaugural book for the One Book, One Vancouver program for the Vancouver Public Library.
