= Jennifer Hodge de Silva =

Canadian filmmaker

- Born: 28 January 1951; Montreal, Quebec, Canada
- Died: 5 May 1989 (aged 38); Montreal, Quebec, Canada
- Education: Glendon College (BA, 1974)
- Occupation: Filmmaker
- Notable work: Home Feeling: A Struggle for Community (1983)
- Movement: Black liberalism
- Spouse: Paul de Silva (married 1982)
- Children: Zinzi de Silva
- Parent: Mairuth Sarsfield

Jennifer Hodge de Silva (28 January 1951 – 5 May 1989) was a Canadian filmmaker. Her film, Home Feeling: Struggle for a Community, revealed tensions between and police and residents of the Jane and Finch neighbourhood of Toronto, who are mainly immigrants from Jamaica and Africa. She was the first black filmmaker to work with the National Film Board of Canada (NFB) and the Canadian Broadcasting Corporation (CBC).

== Career ==
In 1978 she worked with Terence Macartney-Filgate on the film Fields of Endless Day as assistant director and associate producer while she was a student. The next year she worked with him again as associate producer of the CBC documentary Dieppe 1942. She covered stories about the lives of Chinese-Canadian immigrants and Indigenous artists and covered social issues in diverse neighbourhoods.

She directed several documentaries during the 1980s which have been called representative of black liberalism. Cameron Bailey, a Canadian film critic and film festival programmer, acknowledged her work in his 1990 article later published in a film anthology. She made films that were sponsored by organizations such as the John Howard Society.

Her 1983 documentary Home Feeling: A Struggle for Community, examining the relations between the police force and the black community, is regularly used in classrooms.

== Personal life ==
Her mother was activist, diplomat, broadcaster, and author Mairuth Sarsfield.

== Selected filmography ==
- Jennifer Hodge and Roger McTair (1983). Home Feeling: A Struggle for Community (film). Toronto: National Film Board of Canada.
