= Shayla Stonechild =

Indigenous Canadian model and advocate

Shayla Stonechild is an Indigenous Canadian model and health and wellness advocate. She is best known for competing in the ninth season of The Amazing Race Canada as a team with her brother, actor Joel Oulette, and appearing as an advocate in the 2025 edition of Canada Reads.

Originally from Medicine Hat, Alberta, she is a member of the Muscowpetung Saulteaux Nation. She is the cousin of Neil Stonechild, who was a victim of the Saskatoon freezing killings. She moved to Vancouver, British Columbia to study acting at the Vancouver Academy of Dramatic Arts, graduating in 2014 and later having supporting or guest roles in the television series Klondike, Siren and Tales from the Rez, and the theatrical film Indian Road Trip.

After being introduced to yoga by fellow actress Grace Dove, she gained prominence as an online influencer when she launched Matriarch Movement, a podcast and social networking platform to highlight and promote stories about indigenous health, personal development and creativity. She has also been a brand ambassador for Lululemon, and a television host of APTN's Red Earth Uncovered and Entertainment Tonight Canada's annual Indigenous Artists & Icons specials.

In 2022 she won an Indspire Award in the Youth category for her advocacy work.

She appeared in the 2025 edition of Canada Reads, advocating for Ma-Nee Chacaby's memoir A Two-Spirit Journey.
