= Indian Road Trip =

- Directed by: Allan W. Hopkins
- Written by: Allan W. Hopkins
- Produced by: Allan W. Hopkins; Amy Fox; Ingo Lou
- Starring: Ajuawak Kapashesit; Paul C. Grenier; Dale Hunter
- Cinematography: Vincent De Paula
- Edited by: Catherine De Paula; Jeffrey Lando
- Music by: Jason Burnstick
- Production companies: Road Trip Films; Trembling Void Studios
- Release date: December 15, 2020 (Whistler)
- Running time: 90 minutes
- Country: Canada
- Language: English

Indian Road Trip is a Canadian comedy film, directed by Allan W. Hopkins and released in 2020. The film stars Ajuawak Kapashesit and Paul C. Grenier as Hank and Cody, two aimless young First Nations cousins in British Columbia who are planning a road trip to Vancouver's Wreck Beach, but after being caught in a petty crime they are forced to drive elder Hetta Yellow-Fly (Dale Hunter) to make peace with her estranged sister.

The cast also includes Evan Adams, Ross Munro, Nathan Alexis, Shayla Stonechild and Nathaniel Arcand.

A short version of the film was screened at the Whistler Film Festival in 2015, and was expanded into a feature film in 2016 after Hopkins was accepted into the festival's Screenwriters Lab. It was shot in the Merritt area in 2017; however, Hopkins' post-production funding fell through, and the film was left in limbo until he was able to secure new funding from the Aboriginal Peoples Television Network.

The film premiered at Whistler in 2020, where Hopkins won the award for Best British Columbia Director and received an honorable mention for the Borsos Competition award for Best Screenplay.
