= Evan Jones (Stitch Media) =

Evan Jones is an experienced Alternate Reality Game puppetmaster and the owner of Stitch Media with offices in London, Ontario and Toronto.

== Education ==
Jones studied at McMaster University with a combined Honours Arts & Science degree specializing in Computer Science and Film Studies. After this he took Interactive Multimedia at Sheridan College and then attended the Canadian Film Centre for the Interactive Art & Entertainment Programme.

During his time at McMaster University, he competed internationally in Quiz Bowl trivia tournaments, winning the DII title at Sectionals in 2000 and beating out Ivy League competitors such as Cambridge and Yale.

== Transmedia work ==
- In 2005, Jones became Creative Director and Puppetmaster for the ReGenesis Extended Reality Game which won a 2007 International Emmy Award for Interactive Program.
- In 2006, Jones was Creative Director and Puppetmaster for the Fallen Alternate Reality Game, which won Outstanding Achievement in Interactive Television in the 2007 Primetime Emmy Awards.
- In 2007, Jones was the creator of The Border Interactive which was nominated for a Gemini Award for Best Cross-Platform and won a Banff World Television Award for Mobile Programs & Enhancements.
- In 2008 he was the game designer for the Sarah Connor Chronicles ARG.
- In 2009 he consulted for Xenophile Media on Love Letters to the Future, a Greenpeace project which won two Webby Awards for Green and People's Voice.
- In 2010 Jones' company Stitch Media released its first interactive documentary, Redress Remix, on OMNI Television which won the United Nations' World Summit Award for E-Culture & Heritage.
- In 2012 Jones was named one of McMaster University's Top 10 People of Impact
- In 2012 Jones's company Stitch Media overturned a ruling by the Nova Scotia Department of Finance on the definition of interactivity in the Nova Scotia Supreme Court

== Awards and recognition ==
Year	Project	Award
2019	Flow Weaver	Canadian Screen Awards, Best Virtual Reality Game - Nominee
2018	Thornwood Heights	Canadian Screen Awards, Cross-Platform Project (Fiction) - Nominee
2018	Home to Win Integrated Digital Strategy	Canadian Screen Awards, Cross-Platform Project (Non-Fiction) - Nominee
2016	Home to Win Integrated Digital Strategy	Digi Award, Best Interactive Content - Winner
2016	Together Tales: Capes in the Family	Canadian Screen Awards, Best Original Interactive Production Produced for Digital Media - Nominee
2016	Together Tales: Capes in the Family	Banff Rockie Awards, Interactive Content for Kids - Nominee
2015	Darknet Files	Canadian Screen Awards, Cross-Platform Project (Fiction) - Nominee
2015	Together Tales	FutureBook BookTech Award - Nominee
2013	The Drunk and on Drugs Happy Funtime Hour	Canadian Screen Awards, Cross-Platform Project (Fiction) - Winner
2011	The Drunk and on Drugs Happy Funtime Hour	Digi Awards, Best in Digital Advertising - Winner
2008	The Border: Interactive	Banff Rockie Awards, Mobile Program Enhancement - Winner
