= Bachelor of Arts and Science =

Undergraduate-level academic degree

A Bachelor of Arts and Science(s) (BASc), sometimes as Bachelor of Science and Arts (BScA, BSA, or B.Arts Sc.), is an undergraduate bachelor's degree conferred by a small number of universities from countries including the United States, Canada, the United Kingdom, New Zealand, Australia, and France. There is no one set way in which a Bachelor of Arts and Science programme is generally structured but they generally involve students taking interdisciplinary courses from both the liberal arts and the sciences, and/or require a student to complete the general requirements for a bachelor's degree for two different academic majors (or academic minors) — one that usually leads to a BA degree and one that usually leads to a BSc degree. The degrees are generally designed to be completed in three to four years, depending on the institution.

In English-speaking universities, the BASc is not an example of a double degree, as universities only confer a single degree. However, Sciences Po, the only French-speaking university to offer the programme, grants a dual Bachelor's degree upon completion.
