= Not Yet: A Memoir of Living and Almost Dying =

2009 memoir by Wayson Choy

- Author: Wayson Choy
- Subject: Immigrant generations
- Genre: Non-fiction, memoir
- Publisher: Doubleday Canada
- Publication date: March 31, 2009
- Publication place: Canada
- Media type: Print (Hardcover)
- Pages: 208 pp.
- ISBN: 9780385663106

Not Yet: A Memoir of Living and Almost Dying is a memoir written by Canadian writer Wayson Choy, first published in March 2009 by Doubleday Canada. The author recounts his experiences following a combined asthma attack and cardiac arrest. The book was favorably reviewed in The Globe and Mail, and on straight.com.
