= Gladstone Secondary School =

Public secondary school in Vancouver, British Columbia

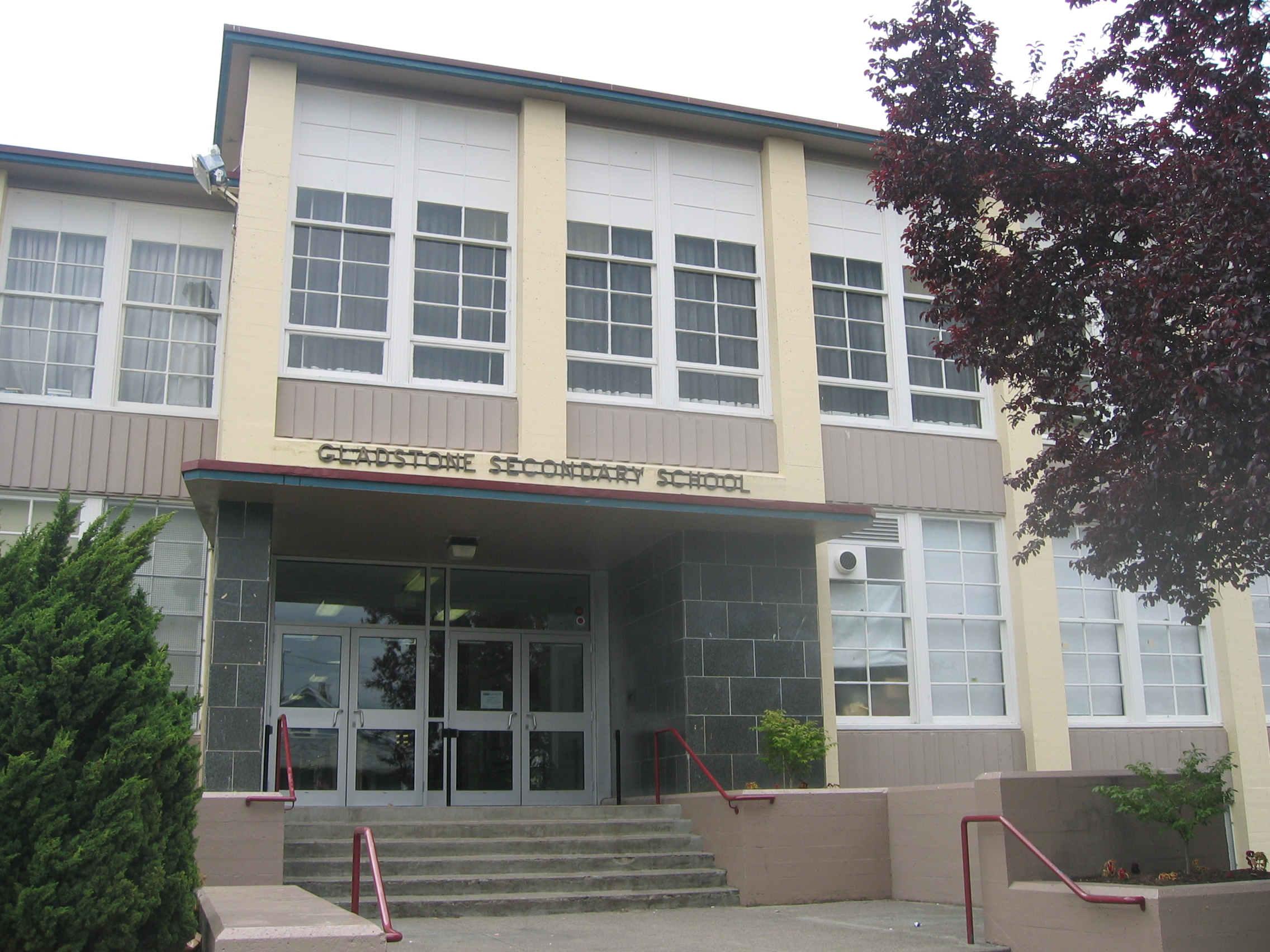

Location
- 4105 Gladstone Street; Vancouver, British Columbia, V5N 4Z2; Canada; 49°14′55″N 123°03′39″W

Information
- School type: Public, Secondary school
- Motto: Fide et Virtute (in Latin) (By Faith and By Courage)
- Founded: 1950
- School board: School District 39 Vancouver
- Area trustee: Victoria Jung
- Principal: Alec MacInnes (Acting)
- Grades: 8–12
- Enrollment: 964 (2025-2026)
- Capacity: 1600
- Language: English
- Area: Kensington-Cedar Cottage
- Colours: Red and White (Black is also used in some applications)
- Mascot: Lion
- Team name: Gladiators
- Public transit access: 7, 19, 20, 25, N19, N20, Expo Line
- Website: gladstone.vsb.bc.ca

Gladstone Secondary School is a public secondary school located in the Kensington–Cedar Cottage neighbourhood of Vancouver, British Columbia, Canada. The school serves students in grades 8 to 12 and is operated by the Vancouver School Board. As of the 2025–26 school year, it had an enrolment of 965 students.

== History ==
Gladstone is built on property that was once an old farm. The location was designated for a school in the late 1920s, but because of the Great Depression and Second World War, construction did not begin until 1949. The school is named after William Ewart Gladstone, the prime minister of the United Kingdom four times between 1868 and 1894.

Gladstone opened as a junior high school in 1950 with an enrollment of 1376 students. Mr. D.B. Mackenzie, who was Gladstone's first principal, opened the sliding gym doors to symbolize the opening of the school at a ceremony attended by all staff members and students. From the opening year in 1950, Gladstone added a grade each year until the first class graduated in 1954. Since then, many students have been through Gladstone's doors.

== Academics ==
Gladstone offers three Advanced Placement courses in English, Calculus and Chemistry. The school previously offered a Montessori program; however, the program ended in 2010.

=== Mini School ===
The Gladstone Mini School is an advanced academic program that allows students to complete the coursework for grades 8 to 10 in only two years. The program has three streams: Humanities (consisting of English, Social Studies, French, and Physical and Health Education (PHE) Leadership), Mathematics–Science (consisting of Math, Science, and PHE Leadership), or Full Stream, which includes all six Mini School courses. The program is by application.

== Sports ==
Gladstone students represent the school in a number of sports including soccer, basketball, volleyball, ultimate, badminton, wrestling, track and field, cross country, and swimming.

== Notable alumni ==
- Warren Cann, musician
- Mig Macario, actor (aka Mike Andaluz)
- Wayson Choy, author
- Ken Lum, visual artist
- Nelson Skalbania
- Dr. Joy Masuhara, LGBTQ+ trailblazer and family physician

== In popular culture ==
The TV show Supernatural used Gladstone as a shooting location in November 2015.

Gladstone was featured in Season 1, Episode 7 of 21 Jump Street. The TV show used the school as a shooting location and the episode aired in May 1997. Season 1 episode 7 "Gotta Finish the Riff" was the episode name and former student Mig Macario aka Mike Andaluz was coincidentally a featured guest actor in the episode.

== Timetable ==
Gladstone Secondary School operates on a linear timetable on semester rotation, from September to December and January to June. Each day has four blocks: four blocks of 1 hour and 22 minutes with FIT Time (Flexible Instructional Time) every Tuesday and Thursday, with Tuesday having morning FIT and Thursday having afternoon FIT. Each FIT time has a length of 50 minutes. Each day of classes begin at 8:40 a.m. and end at 3:05 p.m. (Monday to Friday).
