= Sherraine Schalm =

Canadian fencer (born 1975)

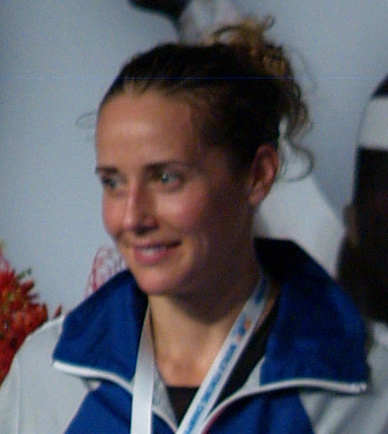
- Sherraine Schalm at the 2009 World Fencing Championships podium

Personal information
- Born: 21 June 1975 (age 51) Brooks, Alberta, Canada
- Height: 1.71 m (5 ft 7 in)
- Weight: 60 kg (132 lb)

Fencing career
- Sport: Fencing
- Weapon: épée
- Hand: right-handed
- FIE ranking: rankings
Medal record
Women's épée
Representing Canada
World Championships
Silver medal – second place	2009 Antalya	Individual épée
Bronze medal – third place	2005 Leipzig	Individual épée
Pan American Games
Silver medal – second place	2003 Santo Domingo	Individual épée
Silver medal – second place	2011 Guadalajara	Team épée
Bronze medal – third place	2003 Santo Domingo	Team épée

Sherraine Schalm, formerly Sherraine Schalm-MacKay (born June 21, 1975), is a former top-ranked Canadian Olympic épée fencer. She is also an elementary school teacher and author. She is a graduate of the University of Ottawa. At the 2005 World Fencing Championships she won a bronze medal in the individual épée event, becoming the first Canadian to ever win a World Championships medal in the sport. The next season, in 2005–06, she won the overall World Cup title.

Born in Brooks, Alberta, Schalm has earned the best ever results for any Canadian woman fencer at the world championships, the Olympic Games and is a four-time medallist at the Pan American Games. She has competed at four Summer Olympics. In 2000 she finished 19th in the individual event. In 2004 she finished 18th in the individual event, and fourth in the team event.

Schalm published a memoir, Running With Swords (under the name Sherraine MacKay), in 2005.

She championed Mairuth Sarsfield's novel No Crystal Stair in the 2005 edition of the Canada Reads competition.

In the 2008 Summer Olympics, Schalm was widely expected to challenge for a medal, but lost in the second round (after getting a bye for the first round). She was seeded 5th and finished 9th.

She claimed a silver medal at the 2009 World Fencing Championships.

At the 2012 Summer Olympics, she reached the top 32 but lost to South Korean fencer Shin A-lam.

She retired in 2013.

== Books ==
- MacKay, Sherraine (2005). Running with Swords: The Adventures and Misadventures of an Irrepressible Canadian Fencing Champion. Don Mills, Ontario: Fitzhenry and Whiteside. ISBN 1-55041-982-X.
