= Catherine Leroux =

Canadian novelist (born 1979)

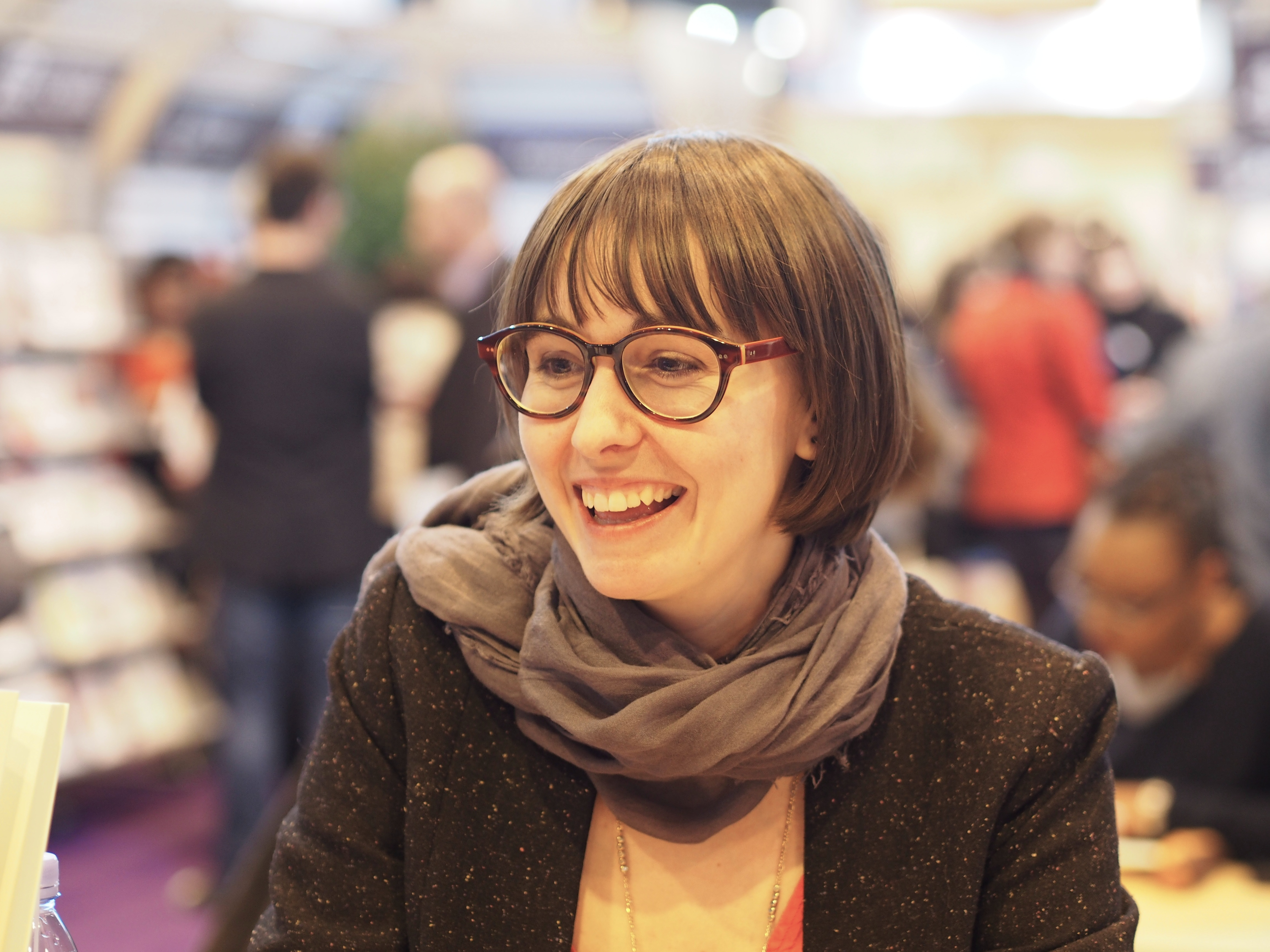
- Catherine Leroux at the Festival du Livre de Paris in 2014.
- Born: Rosemère, Quebec, Canada
- Occupation: Writer
- Writing career
- Period: 2010s–present
- Notable works: The Future, Le mur mitoyen, Madame Victoria
- Notable awards: Prix littéraire France-Québec (2014); Prix Adrienne-Choquette (2016)

Catherine Leroux (born 1979) is a French Canadian novelist.

== Early life ==
Leroux was born in Rosemère, Quebec in 1979. She graduated university with a degree in philosophy.

== Career ==
Before becoming a novelist, Leroux worked as the Toronto correspondent for Radio Canada.

Leroux's first novel, La marche en forêt, was published in 2011 and was a finalist for the 2012 Prix des libraires du Québec.

Le mur mitoyen followed in 2013, and was a finalist for the 2013 Grand prix du livre de Montréal and won the Prix France-Québec in 2014. She was a shortlisted nominee for the 2016 Scotiabank Giller Prize for The Party Wall, a translation of Le mur mitoyen by Lazer Lederhendler.

Leroux published the short story collection Madame Victoria in 2015. The book won the Prix Adrienne-Choquette in 2016. An English edition translated by Lazer Lederhendler, also called Madame Victoria, was published in 2018.

At the 2018 Governor General's Awards, she was shortlisted for the Governor General's Award for English to French translation for Le saint patron des merveilles, her translation of Mark Frutkin's novel Fabrizio's Return. At the 2019 Governor General's Awards, she won in the same category for Nous qui n'étions rien, her translation of Madeleine Thien's novel Do Not Say We Have Nothing.

In 2020, Leroux published her third novel, The Future (L'avenir), an alternate history set in Detroit, Michigan premised on the city having remained under French control until present times, under the name "Fort Détroit". The novel won the 2024 edition of Canada Reads, where it was defended by Heather O'Neill. In 2025, the novel was longlisted for the International Dublin Literary Award.
