= All That Matters (novel) =

2004 novel by Wayson Choy

- Author: Wayson Choy
- Language: English
- Publisher: Doubleday Canada
- Publication date: 2004
- Publication place: Canada (Vancouver)
- ISBN: 978-0-385-25777-0
- OCLC: 57697176
- Preceded by: The Jade Peony

All That Matters is a novel by Wayson Choy. First published in 2004 by Doubleday Canada, it is the sequel to his debut novel, The Jade Peony (1995), and was nominated for the Giller Prize.

Set in Vancouver, British Columbia, Canada during the 1930s and 1940s, All That Matters follow the lives of the Chen family, this time through the experiences of Kiam-Kim, the First Son and Oldest Brother of Jook-Liang, Jung-Sum, and Sek-Lung, whose childhood and adolescence in a strict but caring Chinatown family. The story runs parallel to the events related in The Jade Peony.

== Plot synopsis ==
Kiam-Kim is three years old when he arrives by ship at Gold Mountain with his father and his grandmother, Poh-Poh, the Old One. It is 1926, and because of famine and civil war in China, they have left their village in Toishan province to become the new family of Third Uncle, a wealthy businessman whose own wife and son are dead. The place known as Gold Mountain is Vancouver, British Columbia, Canada, and Third Uncle needs help in his large Chinatown warehouse. Canada's 1923 Chinese Exclusion Act forces them, and many others, to use false documents, or ghost papers, to get past the 'immigration demons' and become Third Uncle's Gold Mountain family.

Like many families around them, they must survive in unsavoury surroundings. Since the closing down of the railroad work camps, Chinatown is filled with unemployed labourers who live in poor rooming-houses. Sea winds fill the rooms with acrid smoke from the mills and refineries of False Creek, and freight trains shake their windows at night with noises the Old One says are dragons playing. Yet this is a land where the Chen family will not starve; where they will be able to keep a girl baby, and not sell her into servitude as was the Old One, whose back is scarred from whippings.

In their new life, there is a constant struggle to balance the new Gold Mountain ideas with the old traditions and knowledge of China. Old One doesn't like Kiam-Kim speaking English, and Kiam-Kim knows that to be without manners, without a sense of correct social ritual, is to bring dishonour to one's family. Children who lose their 'Chinese brains' are called 'bamboo stumps' by the elders because of the hollow emptiness within, so Kiam-Kim must study hard at Chinese school as well as English school. He must help Poh-Poh to cook for her mahjong ladies, and her hard knuckles rap his head when he misbehaves.

Although Poh-Poh urges him to stick with his own kind and not let non-Chinese 'barbarians' into the house, Kiam-Kim forges a lasting friendship with Jack O'Connor, the Irish boy next door. He also has a girlfriend, Jenny, daughter of one of the mahjong ladies who owns a corner grocery shop. Meanwhile, China is suffering during the Japanese invasion of Manchuria, and soon the whole world is at war. Boys at school are enlisting, and many Chinese have gone back to fight for the old country. Kiam-Kim wonders, "What world would we fight for?" Canada is his home, yet he knows that the new country does not want Chinese soldiers.

== Reception ==
The Jade Peony was "a genuine contribution to history as well as fiction" according to author Margaret Drabble. It spent 26 weeks on the Globe and Mail bestseller list, shared the 1995 Trillium Award with Margaret Atwood, and won the Vancouver Book Award. Blending rich historical detail with powerful personal stories, All That Matters follows Kiam-Kim as he learns the responsibilities and rewards of family and community, as he approaches adulthood in a city much divided, and as he faces decisions about what truly matters in life. More than anything else, the novel is an exploration of his character. "I think all stories should arise organically from the characters' definitions of the world," says Wayson Choy, who believes that it is in the identification of reader with character that literature exists. "If you give details that ring true...that's the meaning conveyed by good writing."
