= Heather O'Neill =

Canadian writer (b. 1973)

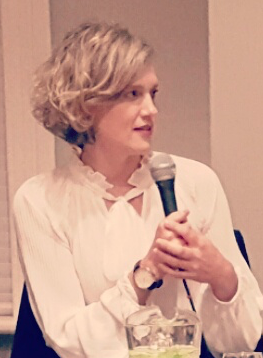
- Heather O'Neill speaking at a book panel in 2016
- Born: 1973 (age 52–53); Montreal, Quebec
- Education: McGill University
- Occupations: Writer, poet, journalist, screenwriter, novelist
- Writing career
- Notable work: Lullabies for Little Criminals

Heather O'Neill (born 1973) is a Canadian novelist, poet, short story writer, screenwriter and journalist, who published her debut novel, Lullabies for Little Criminals, in 2006. The novel was subsequently selected for the 2007 edition of Canada Reads, where it was championed by singer-songwriter John K. Samson. Lullabies won the competition. The book also won the Hugh MacLennan Prize for Fiction and was shortlisted for eight other major awards, including the Orange Prize for Fiction and the Governor General's Award and was longlisted for International Dublin Literary Award.

Lullabies for Little Criminals was a publishing sensation in Canada and went on to become an international bestseller. O'Neill was named by Chatelaine as one of the most influential women in Canada.

== Biography ==
O'Neill was born in Montreal, Quebec. Her father is from Montreal and her mother is American. O'Neill spent the first part of her childhood in Montreal. After her parents' divorce, she lived in the American South with her mother for several years before returning to Montreal to live with her father. She has lived in Montreal ever since. She was educated at Dawson College and McGill University. She has one daughter, Arizona, whom she raised as a single parent.

== Work ==
She wrote the screenplay for the 2000 film Saint Jude, based in part on her own early short story "Big Al". Directed by John L'Ecuyer and starring Liane Balaban and Nicholas Campbell, it debuted at the 2000 Toronto International Film Festival.

O'Neill published her debut novel Lullabies for Little Criminals in 2006 and it immediately became a bestseller.

She published her second novel The Girl Who Was Saturday Night in 2014. It was shortlisted for the 2014 Scotiabank Giller Prize. It was also nominated for the Baileys Women's Prize for Fiction and the Encore Award.

Her short story collection, Daydreams of Angels, was published in 2015 and was shortlisted for the Scotiabank Giller Prize. It won the 2016 Danuta Gleed Literary Award from The Writers' Union of Canada.

Her third novel The Lonely Hearts Hotel, was published in 2017 and won the Hugh MacLennan Prize for Fiction.

She has made contributions to The New York Times Magazine, The Guardian, This American Life, CBC Radio, Rookie Magazine, Elle, Chatelaine, the National Post, The Globe and Mail the Toronto Star, and The Walrus.

O'Neill was on the jury for the 2018 Scotiabank Giller Prize.

O'Neill's 2017 CLC Kreisel Lecture was published in 2018 by University of Alberta Press as Wisdom in Nonsense: Invaluable Lessons From My Father.

In 2019 O'Neill was awarded the Writers' Trust Fellowship for her body of work.

She appeared as a panellist in the 2024 edition of Canada Reads, winning the competition while championing Susan Ouriou's English translation of Catherine Leroux's novel The Future. With Lullabies for Little Criminals having won the competition in 2007, her participation in the debates made her one of very few people who have ever been featured in the series both as an author and as an advocate.

== Awards ==
- Winner of Canada Reads 2007
- Winner of the Hugh MacLennan Prize for Fiction 2007
- Shortlisted for the Governor General's Award 2007
- Shortlisted for the Orange Prize for Fiction 2008
- Shortlisted for the Amazon.ca/ Books in Canada First Novel Award 2007
- Shortlisted for the Barnes and Noble Discover Great New Writers Award 2007
- Shortlisted for the Grand Prix du Livre de Montreal 2007
- Shortlisted for the Exclusive Books Boeke Prize South Africa 2008
- Longlisted for the International Dublin Literary Award 2008
- Winner, GOLD, National Magazine Awards, Best Feature Short (ELLE CANADA), 2010
- Winner, GOLD, National Magazine Awards, Best Feature Short (CHATELAINE), 2011
- Shortlisted for the Scotiabank Giller Prize 2014
- Longlisted Baileys Women's Prize for Fiction 2015
- Longlisted Encore Award 2015
- Longlisted Frank O'Connor International Short Story Award 2015
- Shortlisted for the Scotiabank Giller Prize 2015
- Shortlisted the Hugh MacLennan Prize for Fiction 2015
- Longlisted for the International Dublin Literary Award 2015
- Winner Danuta Gleed Literary Award 2016
- Shortlisted for the Sunburst Award 2016
- Longlisted Baileys Women's Prize for Fiction 2017
- Winner of the Hugh MacLennan Prize for Fiction 2017
- Winner of the Writers' Trust Fellowship 2019

== Books ==
- two eyes are you sleeping, 1999 (poetry)
- Lullabies for Little Criminals, 2006 (novel)
- The Girl Who Was Saturday Night, 2014 (novel)
- Daydreams of Angels, 2015 (short stories)
- The Lonely Hearts Hotel, 2017 (novel)
- Wisdom in Nonsense: Invaluable Lessons from My Father, 2018 (nonfiction)
- When We Lost Our Heads, 2022 (novel)
- The Capital of Dreams, 2024 (novel)

== Other work ==
O'Neill has written a book of poetry entitled two eyes are you sleeping.

Her 2008 short story "The End of Pinky" was adapted as a 2013 animated short of the same name, with O'Neill providing English narration. In December 2013, it was named to the Toronto International Film Festival's annual top ten list, in the short film category.
