= McMaster Arts and Science =

Arts and Science Program
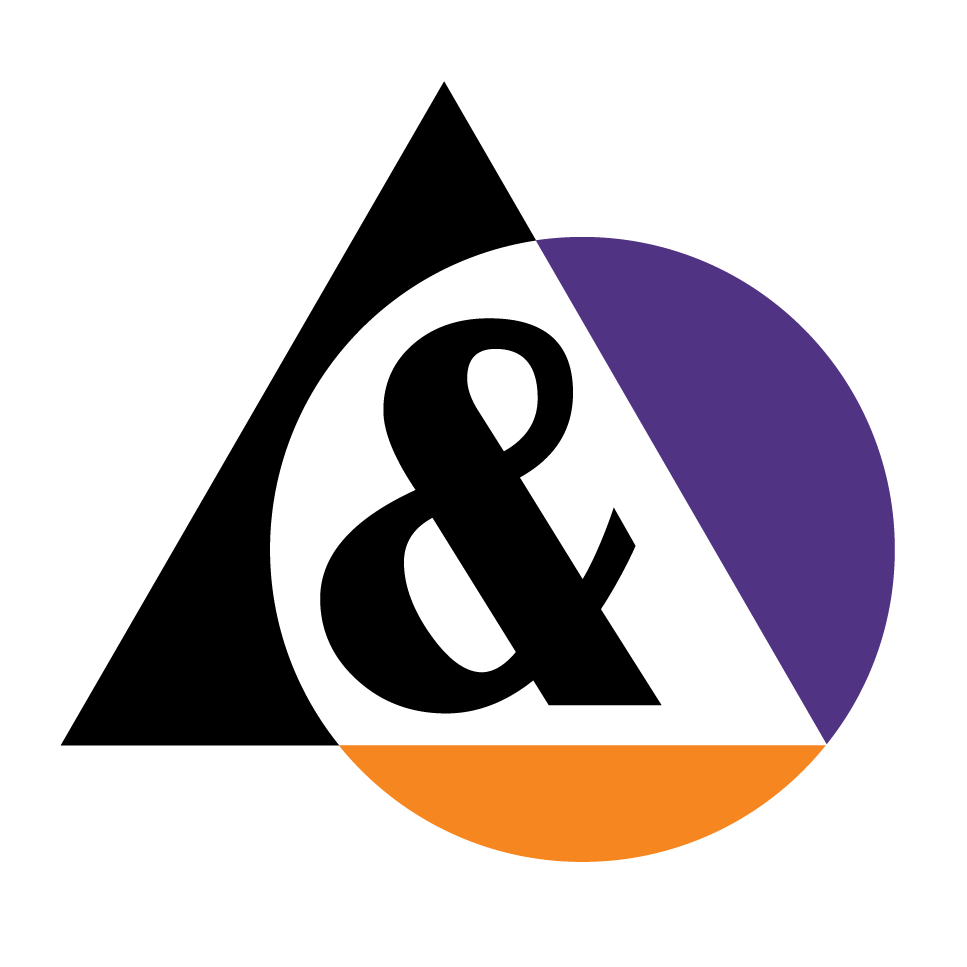
- Established: 1981
- Director: Beth Marquis
- Undergraduates: 250
- Location: (Canada) Hamilton, ON, Canada
- Degree Granted: B. Arts Sc.
- Mascot: SASSquatch
- Website: artsci.mcmaster.ca

The Arts and Science Program (also known as: ArtSci, Mac ArtsSci, or Arts & Sci) is an undergraduate program at McMaster University in Hamilton, Ontario. It is one of the smallest direct-entry programs in the university, with a target enrolment of only 70 students per year, and with a total size of about 250 students.

Due to its small size, its reputation, and its popularity, the Arts and Science Program requires a competitive high-school GPA in addition to a supplementary application.

== History ==
After the Second World War, McMaster University, like many other universities around the world, saw dramatic increases in student enrolment and degrees granted in the newly developing sciences. Initiatives to revive the liberal arts in the university were proposed in the ensuing years but did not leave the drawing board.

In the mid-1970s, there was a growing sense at McMaster that although 4 year honours degrees were exceeding expectations, the 3 year bachelor's degrees did not. In 1977, a university report recommended that McMaster explore the formation of an interdisciplinary program. In the spring of 1979, an ad hoc committee formed to investigate the recommendations, chaired by Dr. Dugal Campbell, reported to the university Senate. The Campbell Committee report was then endorsed by the university Senate in late June, 1979.

In the late summer of 1979, the Academic Vice President at the time, Leslie J. King, asked Dr. Herb Jenkins, a professor in McMaster's psychology department, to form a council to discuss, and serve as the director of a new baccalaureate program in general studies. The Planning Council presented the "Outline of a New Baccalaureate Degree Programme in Arts and Science" in mid-March 1980. After criticisms were heard at the general faculty meeting on March 27 of that year, the Council revised the outline and presented it to the university Senate in May 1980. In September 1981, the Arts & Science Program welcomed its first year of students.

The Arts & Science Program awards its students with a B. Arts Sc. Students may earn the degree in 3 years, although most students complete the degree in 4 years and earn the "Honours" appellation as any other undergraduate program. At the general faculty meeting of March 1980, the professors from the faculty of Health Sciences were particularly enthusiastic about the outline presented. This led to the formation of the small, inquiry and interdisciplinary-based Health Sciences undergraduate program in 1999. After Dr. Herb Jenkins retired as the first director of the Arts & Science Program, he, along with Dr. Bob Hudspith went on to found the Engineering and Society program at the Faculty of Engineering. McMaster's Integrated Sciences Program has also been modeled with the Arts & Science Program.

== Admissions ==
The Arts and Science Program currently considers applications from applicants with a high school average of 88% or greater. The program requires an applicant's completion of the following Ontario high school courses as prerequisites for admission:

- ENG4U
- 1 of MHF4U, MCV4U (MCV4U is strongly recommended)
- 4 additional U/M level courses of which two must be U level.

In addition to the completion of these courses and the submission of an application, the program requires that applicants complete a supplementary application, which is due each year on 1 February. The supplementary application enables the program to learn more about the applicant and their ideas, interests, and activities. Each year, the Arts and Science Program receives over 800 applications. The program prides itself in ensuring that all supplementary applications are read thoroughly and given equal consideration.

== Curriculum/Structure ==
Arts & Science stresses the development of skills in writing, speaking, research, and critical and quantitative reasoning. Its curriculum also aims to provide a foundational university-level knowledge base in the natural sciences and the social thought of the Western world. The program's small size facilitates its strong sense of community and interdisciplinary learning, with students taking a diverse range of courses through their four years. Many of the students specialize in a field by completing a combined honours in addition to the Arts and Science program requirements (effectively a double major). Some combined honours require a fifth year of study, unless the student takes courses during summer school or an "overload" course complement. Many students go on to pursue higher learning through either graduate or professional school, or take job opportunities.

Curriculum
| Humanities & Social Sciences | Mathematics & Physical Sciences | Interdisciplinary | Electives |
|---|---|---|---|
| Practices of Knowledge | Indigenous Ways of Knowing | Biology/Chemistry/Environmental Science | Inquiry (Global Issues & elective(s)) |
| Social and Political Thought | Calculus | Writing & Argumentation | |
| Literature | Physics | Technology & Society | |
| Eastern Studies | Statistics | Individual Study/Thesis | |
| Economics | | | |
| 5 courses | 4 courses | 5 or 6 courses | 6 or 7 Elective courses |

Core Program Structure
| Year 1 | Year 2 | Year 3* | Year 4 |
|---|---|---|---|
| Practices of Knowledge | Social and Political Thought | Literature | Thesis/Individual Study |
| Writing & Argumentation | Physics | Technology & Society | Thesis/Individual Study |
| Inquiry of Global Issues | Statistics | Choice of either Eastern Asian Religious Tradition, or Religion and the Law | Upper-year Inquiry or elective |
| Calculus | Economics | Upper-year Inquiry (topics variable) | Elective |
| Biology/Chemistry/Environmental Science | Elective/Science requirement (if not done in Year 1) | Elective | Elective |
| Indigenous Ways of Knowing | Elective | Elective | Elective |

*Many students in the Arts and Science Program opt to take a semester or double semester studying abroad. In this case, they take courses at the university that they are visiting that are deemed to be equivalent to the courses required of them were they to remain at McMaster.

== Expansion ==
During the mid-2000s, the McMaster administration began putting pressure on the program to increase its size from 60 to 100 students per year. This campaign was part of a University-wide expansion of all smaller programs such as Medicine and Health Sciences. The idea was met with opposition from most students and professors in the program. Through the late 2010s, the program underwent a further expansion, increasing its enrollment target from 60 students per year to 70.

== Community ==
Students are part of the Society of Arts and Science Students (SASS). SASS is responsible for running social and community events, facilitating inter-program communication, and making educational recommendations to the director of the program. SASS also runs a student website (SASSweb), which is a hub for program information. Arts & Science students have consistently identified the sense of community as one of its main strengths. SASS's logo is a cartoon depiction of its mascot: a Sasquatch. It was updated in January 2020 to replace the defunct prior logo, which had long been suspected of violating the copyright of the 2010 Vancouver Olympic Mascot Quatchi.

The Program itself runs a wide variety of social gathering activities and community events throughout the academic year. These activities and events include: The ArtSci Musical, organized intramural teams, a semesterly coffee house, regular informal drop-in events at the Arts and Science office, and more. As part of its community building endeavours, The Arts and Science program runs a buddy program called the Sib program. This program pairs incoming second year students with incoming first year students, with the goal of incorporating them into the Arts and Science community, and helping them transition into the university and the program.

== Directors ==
| Director | Term |
|---|---|
| Beth Marquis | 2022–present |
| Jean Wilson | 2011–2022 |
| Gary Warner (interim) | 2010–2011 |
| Peter Sutherland | 2005–2010 |
| Gary Warner | 2000–2005 |
| Barbara Ferrier | 1990–2000 |
| Herb Jenkins | 1981–1990 |

== Noted alumni ==
- Evan Jones
- Dan Milisavljevic
- Samantha Nutt
- Karen Bakker
- Sarah Henstra
