= No Crystal Stair =

Novel by Mairuth Sarsfield

- Author: Mairuth Sarsfield
- Genre: Historical fiction
- Set in: 1940s Little Burgundy
- Publication date: 1997
- ISBN: 1-896867-02-2

No Crystal Stair is a 1997 novel by Canadian author Mairuth Sarsfield. It is a coming-of-age story set in the Little Burgundy district of Montreal during the 1940s.

The title is a reference to the line "Life for me ain't been no crystal stair" in Langston Hughes's poem "Mother to Son".

== Plot summary ==
Widow Marion Willow works at two jobs to raise her three daughters properly. Fighting racism and sexism, Marion schools her girls in manners, English poetry and the need for an education; her elegant neighbour and rival (both women are in love with railway porter Edmund Thompson) teaches the children the ways of the street and their black cultural heritage.

== Major themes ==
Two themes in the novel run through No Crystal Stair: passing as white and surviving as black. Sarsfield recounts a story about the desire to survive, all the while depicting the cosmopolitan Montreal of the 1940s, a city inhabited by jazz musicians, socialites, artists and gangsters.

== Reception ==
No Crystal Stair was one of the selected novels in the 2005 edition of Canada Reads, where it was defended by Olympic fencer Sherraine MacKay.

The book received reviews from publications including Herizons, School Library Journal, Quill & Quire, and New York Amsterdam News.

The book was the subject of articles in the journals Canadian Review of American Studies and Essays on Canadian Writing.
