= Mairuth Sarsfield =

Canadian activist, diplomat, broadcaster, and author

Mairuth Hodge Sarsfield (6 March 1930 – 7 May 2013) was a Canadian activist, diplomat, broadcaster, and author.

== Biography ==
Sarsfield was born in the Little Burgundy neighbourhood of Montreal to parents Anne Packwood and Dan Vaughan and raised by her mother. She received a degree from Sir George Williams College and McGill University, and later studied at Columbia University and the University of Ghana. She worked as host for the CBC, CTV, and TVOntario. For the Canadian External Affairs Department, she worked on projects such as Expo 67 in Montreal and Expo '70 in Osaka, Japan, organizing the Canadian pavilions. As a senior information officer for the United Nations Environment Programme in Nairobi, Kenya, she developed and launched a worldwide campaign known as "For Every Child a Tree". She was also posted to Washington and New York. She returned to Canada in 1984, and served as governor of the board of directors at the CBC.

Her novel No Crystal Stair was chosen for inclusion in Canada Reads 2005, championed by Olympic fencer Sherraine MacKay.

Mairuth was the mother of Jeremy Hodge (deceased 1983) and filmmaker Jennifer Hodge de Silva (deceased 1989).

== Awards and honours ==
She won numerous awards for theme coordination at world's fair pavilions for Canada, and was named Knight of the National Order of Quebec in 1985. She received the National Congress of Black Women Literary Award for No Crystal Stair. Mairuth Sarsfield Day was declared by the city of Cleveland in honour of her work with the United Nations in Nairobi.

== Publications ==
- The Fourth Wise Man (1961, adaptation of "The Other Wise Man")
- No Crystal Stair (1997)
