= Ma-Nee Chacaby =

Ojibwe-Cree writer and activist (born 1950)

- Born: July 22, 1950 (age 75); Ombabika, Ontario, Canada
- Occupations: Author, activist
- Notable work: A Two-Spirit Journey (2016)
- Website: ma-nee.art

Ma-Nee Chacaby (born July 22, 1950) is an Ojibwe-Cree lesbian writer, elder, spiritual educator, and activist from Canada. She is most noted for her memoir, A Two-Spirit Journey: The Autobiography of a Lesbian Ojibwa-Cree Elder.

== Biography ==
Born and raised in the remote Northern Ontario indigenous community of Ombabika, Chacaby escaped the residential school system because she was away hunting and trapping with her stepfather when government agents arrived in the community during the Sixties Scoop. She wrote in her autobiography, "many times people have told [her] that [she] was lucky that [she] was not forced to go to residential schools," but that she found it often "hard to feel lucky" due to the ongoing physical and sexual abuse she faced. Chacaby suffered ongoing physical and sexual abuse from several adults, including close family members. She started drinking alcohol at the age of ten at a party hosted by her parents. Not long after, she also began abusing car exhaust and gasoline fumes. She continued to turn to alcohol to escape the trauma of the violence she experienced.

Chacaby was primarily raised by her grandmother, who taught her about traditional Ojibwe culture. Her mother died when Chacaby was in her teens, and she was forced into an arranged marriage shortly after. At twenty, she escaped a physically abusive marriage by moving to Thunder Bay, Ontario with her children. She also lived in Winnipeg and Manitoba, and later in Boston.

While living in Thunder Bay, she sparked a local controversy when she openly identified herself as a lesbian in a television news story for Thunder Bay Television in 1988. Through involvement in Alcoholics Anonymous, Chacaby eventually reached sobriety, and began working as a counsellor for those struggling with alcohol and drug addiction, homelessness, and domestic violence, especially at-risk youth and abused women.

She became a local activist for 2SLGBTQ+ and Indigenous issues, and later began to create and exhibit work as a painter, a practice she pursued as part of her healing, before writing and publishing A Two-Spirit Journey. She is fluent in both Cree and Ojibwe and recorded Alcoholic Anonymous' The Big Book in Objiwe so the text could reach more people in need of recovery. She is a parent to biological children, foster children, and adopted children.

In 2013, Chacaby led Thunder Bay's first pride parade. In 2019, Chacaby served as one of the grand marshals of the Fierté Montréal parade.

== A Two-Spirit Journey ==
A Two-Spirit Journey: The Autobiography of a Lesbian Ojibwa-Cree Elder was co-authored by Mary Louisa Plummer and published by the University of Manitoba Press in 2016. It is the 18th title in the Native History Series published by the press. Methodologically, it combines social science and Indigenous oral history. The authors conducted over one hundred hours of interviews as part of their writing process, and the book deals with themes of child abuse, alcohol abuse, sexuality, and post-traumatic stress disorder.

=== Critical acclaim ===
The biography was awarded the Oral History Association's 2017 Book Award, as well as the Ontario Historical Society's 2018 Alison Prentice Award for the best book on Ontario women's history. In addition, A Two-Spirit Journey was a finalist for the Lambda Literary Award for Lesbian Memoir/Biography at the 29th Lambda Literary Awards in 2017, and was shortlisted for the Mary Scorer Award for Best Book by a Manitoba Publisher at the 2017 Manitoba Book Awards.

In 2019, A Two-Spirit Journey was published in French as Un Parcours Bispirituel by Les éditions du remue-ménage.

In 2025, A Two-Spirit Journey won the Canada Reads competition, having been championed by Shayla Stonechild.
