= Paper Shadows =

1999 memoir by Wayson Choy

Paper Shadows: A Chinatown Childhood
- First edition cover of Canadian release
- Author: Wayson Choy
- Subject: Immigrant generations; memoir
- Publisher: Viking Penguin
- Publication date: 1 October 1999
- Publication place: Canada
- Media type: Print (hardcover and paperback)
- Pages: 352
- ISBN: 978-0-312-28415-2

Paper Shadows: A Chinatown Childhood is a memoir written by the Canadian writer Wayson Choy, first published in October 1999 by Viking Press. In the book, the author chronicles his experience growing up as an immigrant in Vancouver's Chinatown in the 1940s and 1950s. Paper Shadows received shortlist honours for the 2000 Vancouver City Book Award and won the 2000 Edna Staebler Award for Creative Non-Fiction.
