= When We Lost Our Heads =

2022 novel by Heather O'Neill

- Author: Heather O'Neill
- Publication date: February 8, 2022
- ISBN: 9780593422908

When We Lost Our Heads is a 2022 Canadian novel by author Heather O'Neill and published by HarperCollins.

Set in the fictional Golden Mile neighbourhood of Montreal in the 1800s, the novel follows two best friends, Marie Antoine and Sadie Arnett, who develop a deep and obsessive friendship early in childhood.

Many of the characters names are taken from real French historical figures. Marie Antoine is an allusion to French queen Marie Antoinette while Sadie Arnett is an allusion to Marquis de Sade and her work Justine & Juliette is a reference to two of de Sade's most well known works: Justine and Juliette.

== Plot ==
Marie Antoine is raised as the spoiled sole heiress of a sugar empire in Montreal's Golden Mile. She eventually befriends Sadie Arnett, the only daughter of poor social climbers with political ambitions. Marie is jealous of Sadie's genius and talent for writing while Sadie is jealous of the way Marie is constantly coddled and loved. Nevertheless, the two girls view each other as each other's only true friend. One day Sadie suggests they play "duel" using Marie's father's pistols. Unbeknown to them the pistols are loaded. They are prevented from killing each other by Agatha, a maid who tried to intervene.

Marie places the blame for the murder on Sadie and Sadie is sent to an all girls' school in England. Marie travels across America with her father constantly feeling ennui and missing Sadie. Meanwhile, at the all girls' school, Sadie accidentally finds a book of pornography and begins to write erotic texts to entertain herself and the girls at school.

When she is 21 Marie is courted by Phillip, Sadie's older brother. Having no interest in any particular man she agrees to allow Phillip to court her as long as he returns Sadie to her. Sadie is brought back to Montreal where she and Marie continue to be fascinated with one another. However, after a disastrous dinner in which Sadie brings up the murder, the Arnett's try to have Sadie institutionalized. A kind maid allows her to escape sending her to the Squalid Mile, a working class part of Montreal.

In Squalid Mile, Sadie is taken in by George, a cross dressing midwife who works in a brothel. George introduces Sadie to the world of sex and helps to edit her work.

Meanwhile, no longer interested in Phillip, Marie tries to call of their engagement and is raped by him. The rape makes her realize that her beloved, recently deceased father, was repeatedly raping the maids. Marie decides to now focus on running her sugar empire as ruthlessly as she can in order to accumulate more power and money.

Sadie eventually finishes her novel Justine and Juliette which, through George's help, becomes a wild success. Flattered by the book, which Marie knows is based on her, Marie retrieves Sadie and promises to always protect her and her writing. While removing Sadie from the squalid mile they encounter Mary Robespierre, Marie's working class doppelgänger who loathes Marie. Sadie warns her that Mary is a threat.

Heartbroken that Sadie has abandoned her, George writes and publishes a pamphlet against Marie and her factory. Mary harnesses the revolutionary energy and tries to incite the working-class women to riot against Marie though George suspects her motives are not to uplift the masses, but simply to take what Marie has.

While going through her father's papers in an attempt to buy off Mary, Marie discovers that she and Mary are twins, the children of a brief affair between their father and Agatha. Marie was a child adopted to replace the biological child who was born to her father and his wife who died at four months. Marie burns the evidence of her parentage and attempts to murder Mary.

In return Mary poisons Marie. After Marie dies, Mary is quickly discovered to be the murderess and brought to trial. Sadie confesses that both she and Marie murdered Agatha as children though rather than being hanged she is institutionalized. George is revealed to be the biological child of Marie's parents who goes on to become a journalist who fights for working-class women.

== Reception ==
The novel was widely praised with CBC calling it "a page-turning novel". Quill and Quire complimented the O'Neill's research skills, noting "Not enough kudos are given to the immense amount of research she undertakes to form the invisible scaffolding of her more recent novels and to synthesize her personal curiosities without getting lost in a fairy trail of facts." The reviewer concluded: "If hatred is the honey in the tea, O'Neill's innate talent for exploring contemporary issues and relationships through page-turning storytelling is the spoonful of sugar that helps the medicine go down." Publishers Weekly positively reviewed the novel, noting "While the uprising subsumes the final act in an abrupt shift, O'Neill's sharp descriptions and her prose's archaic slant successfully immerse readers in the period. It's a little bumpy, but overall this distinctive, character-driven story is delightfully perverse."

The Montreal Review of Books praised the use of dichotomies throughout the novel, commenting, "Heather O'Neill finds what complete opposites have in common through Marie and Sadie, maybe a bigger metaphor of how we are fascinated by what isn't like us. She makes us reconcile with the divides that separate us, in a city she brings to life again and again and again for the pleasure of our imagination."

The novel was nominated for the 2022 Grand Prix du livre de Montréal.
