= Jamie Chai Yun Liew =

Canadian writer and lawyer

Jamie Chai Yun Liew is a Canadian writer, lawyer, and podcaster. Her work focuses on issues related to immigration. She is the author of the novel Dandelion (2022) and the non-fiction text Ghost Citizens (2024), among other works; she also hosts the Migration Conversations podcast.

== Biography ==
Liew was raised in British Columbia. She is of Hakka, Hainanese, and Nyonya ancestry. Her father was born in Brunei, though he did not receive citizenship due to being Chinese.

She received a Bachelor of Arts and Bachelor of Commerce from the University of Calgary, Bachelor of Laws from the University of Ottawa, Master of Laws from Columbia University, and Master of Arts from Carleton University.

In 2006, Liew began practicing law and in 2011, started teaching. In 2021, she became the director of the University of Ottawa's Institute of Feminist and Gender Studies. Still a practicing lawyer, Liew also teaches in the University of Ottawa Faculty of Law.

Liew is married and has two children.

== Writing ==
=== Dandelion (2022) ===
Liew's debut novel, Dandelion, was published by Arsenal Pulp Press in 2022. The novel explores numerous themes, including belonging, migration, isolation, mental health, race and class, motherhood, and family.

Liew wrote Dandelion while on sabbatical in 2018. That year, the manuscript won the Jim Wong-Chu Emerging Writers Award. Liew signed with Arsenal Pulp Press two years later.

CBC Books named Dandelion one of the best novels of 2022. Bruce Deachman, writing for Ottawa Citizen, called the novel "beautifully crafted". It was a longlisted for Canada Reads in 2023, then a finalist in 2025, where it will be championed by Saïd M'Dahoma.

=== Ghost Citizens (2024) ===
Ghost Citizens: Decolonial Apparitions of Stateless, Foreign and Wayward Figures in Law was published by Fernwood Publishing in 2024. The non-fiction text explores the stories of stateless individuals, that is, those who do not have citizenship in any country.

According to Brigitte Pellerin of National Magazine, "The book reads remarkably well and leaves the reader with a fresh awareness of a serious problem".

== Publications ==
- Liew, Jamie Chai Yun; Galloway, Donald (2015). Immigration Law. Essentials of Canadian Law. University of Toronto Press. ISBN 978-1-552-21392-6.
- Liew, Jamie Chai Yun (2022). Dandelion. Arsenal Pulp Press. ISBN 978-1-551-52881-6.
- Liew, Jamie Chai Yun (2024). Ghost Citizens: Decolonial Apparitions of Stateless, Foreign and Wayward Figures in Law. Fernwood Publishing. ISBN 978-1-773-63666-5.
