= The Future (Leroux novel) =

Novel by Catherine Leroux

- First edition cover
- Author: Catherine Leroux
- Original title: L’avenir
- Translator: Susan Ouriou
- Publisher: Éditions Alto
- Publication date: September 15, 2020
- ISBN: 978-2-896-94473-6

The Future (French: L'avenir) is a 2020 French-language novel by Catherine Leroux, published by Éditions Alto. The English translation, published in 2023, was done by Susan Ouriou and published by Biblioasis.

The novel is about a woman named Gloria who is investigating the murder of her daughter, and the disappearance of her two granddaughters. It is an alternate history work where Detroit, in real life a part of the United States, remained French controlled and Francophone.

According to Leroux, she wanted to write in the varieties of French she was familiar with but that it would not "take shape" if her characters were Anglophones with their speech being rendered into French. Therefore, she made it an alternate history so that the character dialog would feel natural.

== Reception ==
Kirkus Reviews stated that the work is "atmospheric" and has "a warm and wild portrait". Kirkus criticized the "jarring" frequent modifications in narrative point of view.

Toronto Star's Alex Good described the work as "hopeful", citing "new, organic, co-operative" alternative societies in a fictional time when a government has failed.

The novel was selected for the 2024 edition of Canada Reads, where it was defended by Heather O'Neill. It won the competition.
