= Lullabies for Little Criminals =

2006 novel by Heather O'Neill

- First edition
- Author: Heather O'Neill
- Language: English
- Publisher: HarperCollins
- Publication date: 2006
- Publication place: Canada
- Media type: Print paperback
- Pages: 330 pp

Lullabies for Little Criminals is the 2006 debut novel by Heather O'Neill.

The book was chosen for inclusion in the 2007 edition of Canada Reads, where it was championed by musician John K. Samson. Lullabies for Little Criminals won the competition.

== Plot summary ==
The novel revolves around the twelve-year-old protagonist named Baby and follows her for two years. Baby lives with her father Jules, who has a worsening heroin addiction. The two move frequently, to various places around Montreal, where they encounter many other characters, among them junkies, bums, pimps, and abused children.

Baby was born while Jules was in high school with her mother, who died soon after Baby was born, though the cause of death is not revealed immediately.

Jules often leaves young Baby by herself wherever they may be living, for anywhere from a week to over a month at a time. Baby becomes distraught and finds herself wandering the streets of Montreal on her own. She is eventually taken away by Child Protective Services and put into a foster home while Jules is in the hospital with tuberculosis. There she makes friends with two boys, Linus Lucas, a 14-year-old who all the children think is the very height of cool, and Zachary, a mellow, happy 12-year-old. When Jules finally picks her up, he promises that everything will return to normal.

As Jules and Baby begin to settle down again, Jules' addiction gets the best of him and he begins to lash out at Baby, often for no reason. Baby eventually runs away and finds a semblance of security with a pimp named Alphonse. Around this time, she is taken into juvenile detention, and spends about a month in there. Alphonse develops an intimate relationship with Baby, taking her virginity, and forcing her to become a prostitute. She becomes one of his "girls" and is fearful of leaving him. She attempts to return to the apartment she had shared with Jules, but it is locked from the inside and nobody is there, so she assumes Jules has abandoned her. Alphonse also exposes her to heroin, making her addicted to it.

Baby goes back to school while still prostituting herself and meets an odd boy named Xavier. Xavier and Baby slowly but surely become closer and begin to date. As their relationship grows, they become very intimate, and have sex at Alphonse's hotel room, the only place they can be alone. When Alphonse returns to find them there, he beats Xavier and sends him home. Alphonse then beats Baby and takes all of her heroin. When Baby wakes up the next morning, she finds Alphonse dead of a drug overdose.

Baby leaves Alphonse's room and is left with nowhere to go. She decides to go to a nearby homeless shelter where she had heard that Jules was staying. They embrace, and Jules explains that he has set up a place to stay with his cousin. They pack up and walk to the local bus station. On the bus, Jules explains that Baby's mother died in a car crash while Jules was driving. The other driver was drunk at the time.

Upon arrival at Jules' cousin's house in Val des Loups, the story ends.

== Awards ==
- Winner of Canada Reads 2007
- Winner of the Hugh MacLennan Prize for Fiction 2007
- Shortlisted for the Governor General's Award 2007
- Shortlisted for the Orange Prize for Fiction 2008
- Shortlisted for the Amazon.ca/ Books in Canada First Novel Award 2007
- Shortlisted for the Barnes and Noble Discover Great New Writers Award 2007
- Shortlisted for the Grand Prix du Livre de Montreal 2007
- Shortlisted for the Exclusive Books Boeke Prize South Africa 2008
- Longlisted for the International Dublin Literary Award 2008

== Adaptation ==
The novel has been optioned for development as a feature film; as of September 2022, Sarah Gadon was attached as director, co-producer, and screenwriter of the adaptation.
