= Peter Cavanaugh =

American disc jockey and author (1941–2021)

- Born: Peter Lawrence Cavanaugh; September 8, 1941; Syracuse, New York, U.S.
- Died: August 13, 2021 (aged 79); Cincinnati, Ohio, U.S.
- Education: Le Moyne College
- Occupations: Disc jockey; radio station manager; author; columnist
- Years active: 1964-2019
- Works: Local DJ; Wild Wednesday
- Spouse: Eileen Cavanaugh (m. 1964, died)

Peter Cavanaugh was a radio jockey and radio station manager in the 1960s and 1990s, and a major contributor to the Flint Michigan rock and roll boom of the 1960s.

== Early life and career ==
Born September 8, 1941, in Syracuse, New York, Cavanaugh was exposed to radio drama at an early age, his father Donald Cavanaugh, died broadcasting live in the summer of 1948. Thanks to a local Parish's Catholic youth ministry teenage Cavanaugh got his first chance to broadcast. He also met his future wife Eileen Scaia through the Catholic Youth Organization. At the age of 16 he had an overall audience share of 58% at his hometown station, WNDR.

After high school he worked full-time as a disc jockey while earning a BA in political science from Le Moyne College in Syracuse before moving to Flint, Michigan where he began work as a local DJ. Cavanaugh premiered artists such AC/DC and The Who to the United States. Cavanaugh moved from the air to control the radio and served as general manager of WTAC. In 1977, he began working for Reams Broadcasting, becoming the general manager of WWCK-FM in Flint, Michigan, and also hosted their "Sunday 60s" radio program every Sunday morning.

== Retirement ==
=== Local DJ ===
In 2002, Cavanaugh self-published an autobiography published via Xlibris.

=== Featuring in the Rock and Roll Hall of fame ===
In 2011, Cavanaugh was chosen as one of the Radio DJs to be listened to in the Rock and Roll Hall of Fame's "On the Air: Rock and Roll and Radio." exhibit.
