= Peter Kavanagh (producer) =

Canadian producer (1953–2016)

Peter Gerard Kavanagh (June 12, 1953 – September 7, 2016) was a Canadian radio producer, television producer, and writer with the Canadian Broadcasting Corporation (CBC) and CBC Radio. Kavanagh was the creator of Canada Reads, an annual "battle of the books" competition which was first broadcast on CBC Radio in 2002. Kavanagh first conceived of the idea for what would become Canada Reads after learning of a similar program on public radio in the United States. On the Canada Reads program, five prominent Canadians, known as "advocates," each select a book. CBC Radio listeners then choose the winner. Past winners of the competition have included Michael Ondaatje, Joseph Boyden and Kim Thúy. Kavanagh was a co-producer on the first season of Canada Reads before leaving the show to pursue other CBC projects.

Kavanagh was born in Deep River, Ontario, on June 12, 1953, as the third of five children of Cyril and Thelma Kavanagh. He contracted paralytic poliomyelitis when he was just two months old and spent much of his early infancy and childhood as a patient at The Hospital for Sick Children in Toronto. He endured medical procedures and surgeries throughout his life. When he was 60-years old, Kavanagh underwent a surgery to lengthen one of his legs, making both legs the same length for the first time. As a result of the operation, he had to learn how to walk again. He documented his experience in his memoir, The Man Who Learned to Walk Three Times, which was published in 2013.

Kavanagh retired from the CBC in 2013.

Peter Kavanagh died of a heart attack on September 7, 2016, at the age of 63. He was survived by his wife, Debi Goodwin, and their daughter, Jane.
