= Black liberalism =

Black liberalism, also known as African-American liberalism, is a political and social philosophy within the United States' African-American community that aligns primarily with liberalism, most commonly associated with the Democratic Party. Modern liberalism is a core value of the Democratic Party, which has consistently received 85–95% of the African-American vote since the 1960s due to the support of the Civil Rights Movement by U.S. Presidents John F. Kennedy and Lyndon B. Johnson.

== Support for capital punishment ==
The African-American community is divided in support for capital punishment, an averaging of polls from the early 2000s finding that 44% of African-Americans were favorable of the measure, while 49% were not, held at a time when African-Americans represented 42% of death row inmates while only comprising 17% of the total population within the United States. Polls held in the mid-2010s showed support for the death penalty was waning in the community, with only 39% in favor while 55% expressed opposition to the measure, a noted contrast from whites; 68% of those polled being in favor while 29% were opposed.

== Support for same-sex marriage ==
In 2006, a poll showed only 39% of African-Americans were in favor of same-sex marriage. On May 9, 2012, African-American President Barack Obama announced his support for same-sex marriage, a poll released shortly afterward showing that African-American support for gay marriage increased from 41% leading to the announcement to 59%, despite predictions that support for these rights would cause a decline in the president's support from Black voters.

== Support for abortion ==
African-American support for abortion is strong, with 67% believing that it should remain legal in all or most cases, 57% saying it should be in all communities, and 66% expressing the view that abortion clinics were safe, according to a July 2012 poll. African-Americans account for 30% of America's abortions, Caucasian-Americans accounting for 36%, a noted disparity that commentators have addressed with varying opinions. According to the Center of Disease Control, African-American women accounted for 36% of all abortions in 2009. African-American conservatives have criticized the disparity, Clenard H. Childress calling it "black genocide" and niece of Martin Luther King, Jr. Alveda King questioning how his "dream" could be sustained with what she called killing the child, adding, "Every aborted baby is like a slave in the womb of his or her mother. The mother decides his or her fate."

== Support for welfare ==
There has been criticism applied to the disparity between African-Americans and Caucasian Americans on welfare, though some African-American commentators have been supportive of the measure. An early 2010s Newsone poll showed 77% of African-Americans favored drug tests for applicants of welfare. By 2014, African-Americans accounted for 32% of welfare recipients.

== Preferred candidates ==
Barack Obama attracted well over 90% of the African-American vote during his presidential campaigns in 2008 and 2012, effectively garnering 13% of the electorate based on a sole demographic. Reasons given for the support were the opportunity for an African-American president.

A May 2016 poll showed Democratic presidential candidate Hillary Clinton with 84% among African-American voters in the 2016 presidential election. Bernie Sanders, the other leading Democratic presidential candidate of the election cycle, was believed to have lacked support from Black voters in the Democratic Party primaries due to Black voters having a tendency to be socially conservative, unlike the white voters that gave large support to his campaign.

In the 2024 U.S. presidential election, Donald Trump increased his share of the Black vote compared with his performance in 2020, reflecting a modest shift within a demographic that has historically supported Democratic candidates by large margins. According to national exit poll data, roughly 15–16 % of Black voters supported Trump in 2024, up from about 8 % in 2020. The gains for Trump were particularly noticeable among some subgroups such as Black men, where support was higher than among Black women. According to national exit-poll data from the 2024 U.S. presidential election, about 21% of Black men reported voting for Donald Trump. This figure comes from aggregated exit poll results showing that among Black male voters nationally, roughly one-fifth supported Trump while the majority still backed Kamala Harris.

These shifts fit into an overall trend in which the Republican Party under Trump expanded its appeal slightly among a few minority voter groups in 2024, including Hispanic and Asian-American voters, contributing to the coalition that helped him win the presidency.

== See also ==
- African-American conservatism
- African-American socialism
