= Jessica J. Lee =

Canadian author

- Occupation: writer
- Website: https://www.jessicajleewrites.com/

Jessica J. Lee is a British and Canadian author and environmental historian. Lee is a mentor in the Master of Fine Arts in Creative Non-Fiction at the University of King's College, Halifax.

== Biography ==
Lee was born in Canada to a Welsh father and a Taiwanese mother. She was brought up in Canada and lived in London and Berlin.

She received her BA from University of King's College in Halifax and her MRes from University of London. She then received her PhD in Environmental History and Aesthetics from York University.

In 2018, Lee founded the non-fiction journal The Willowherb Review. Receiving funds from fewer than a hundred backers on the crowdfunding platform Kickstarter, Lee and company paid writers and artists to produce five issues, with the project formally ending in 2022. The journal had also been funded by a grant provided by Arts Council England.

Reviewers noted that her 2019 memoir Two Trees Make a Forest incorporates elements of environmental analysis to her account of exploring Taiwan, where her mother was born. The book won the 2020 Hilary Weston Writers' Trust Prize for Nonfiction.

== Awards ==
Lee won the 2019 RBC Taylor Prize for emerging authors. The prize came with $10,000 cash, and the mentorship of Kate Harris. In 2020, Two Trees Make a Forest won the Hilary Weston Writers' Trust Prize for Nonfiction and the Boardman Tasker Award for Mountain Literature. In 2021, the book won the Adventure Travel category of the Banff Mountain Book Award. Her 2024 book Dispersals was highly commended by the Wainwright Prize for Nature Writing. The Traditional Chinese translation of the book also won the 2024 Openbook Good Book Prize in Taiwan.

== Publications ==
- Jessica J. Lee (2017). Turning: A Swimming Memoir. Little, Brown Book Group. ISBN 9780349008349.
- Jessica J. Lee (2020). Two Trees Make a Forest: Travels Among Taiwan's Mountains & Coasts in Search of My Family's Past. Penguin Canada. ISBN 9780735239586.
- Jessica J. Lee (2024). A Garden Called Home. Illustrated by Elaine Chen. Tundra Books. ISBN 9781774880470.
- Jessica J. Lee (2024). Dispersals: On Plants, Borders, and Belonging. Penguin Canada. ISBN 9781646221783.
