= Two Trees Make a Forest =

2020 book by Jessica J. Lee

Two Trees Make a Forest: Travels Among Taiwan's Mountains & Coasts in Search of My Family's Past
- First edition
- Author: Jessica J. Lee
- Publisher: Virago Press
- Publication date: Nov 7 2019
- ISBN: 9780735239586

Two Trees Make a Forest is a travel memoir by British Canadian author Jessica J. Lee. In it she describes finding a trove of letters written by her grandfather, and how it leads her to travel to her mother's and grandfather's home of Taiwan.

In its review the Los Angeles Review of Books described the travel portion of the book as mirroring Lee's journey of self-discovery. Its review calls Lee's writing "poetic and emotive" and says her "elegance of language is ever present in the work".

In its review Geographical called the book "a fascinating and gentle read". It states "It is beautifully written, full of metaphor and short passages of illuminating description. But there is also a sense of melancholy which pervades the narrative."

In its annual roundup of book recommendations The New Statesman's Robert Macfarlane wrote the book pushed the border of a memoir, describing it as a "moving exploration of landscape, language and the nature of family."

The book won the 2020 Hilary Weston Writers' Trust Prize for Nonfiction.
