= Samantha Nutt =

Canadian physician and philanthropist (born 1969)

Samantha Nutt CM OOnt
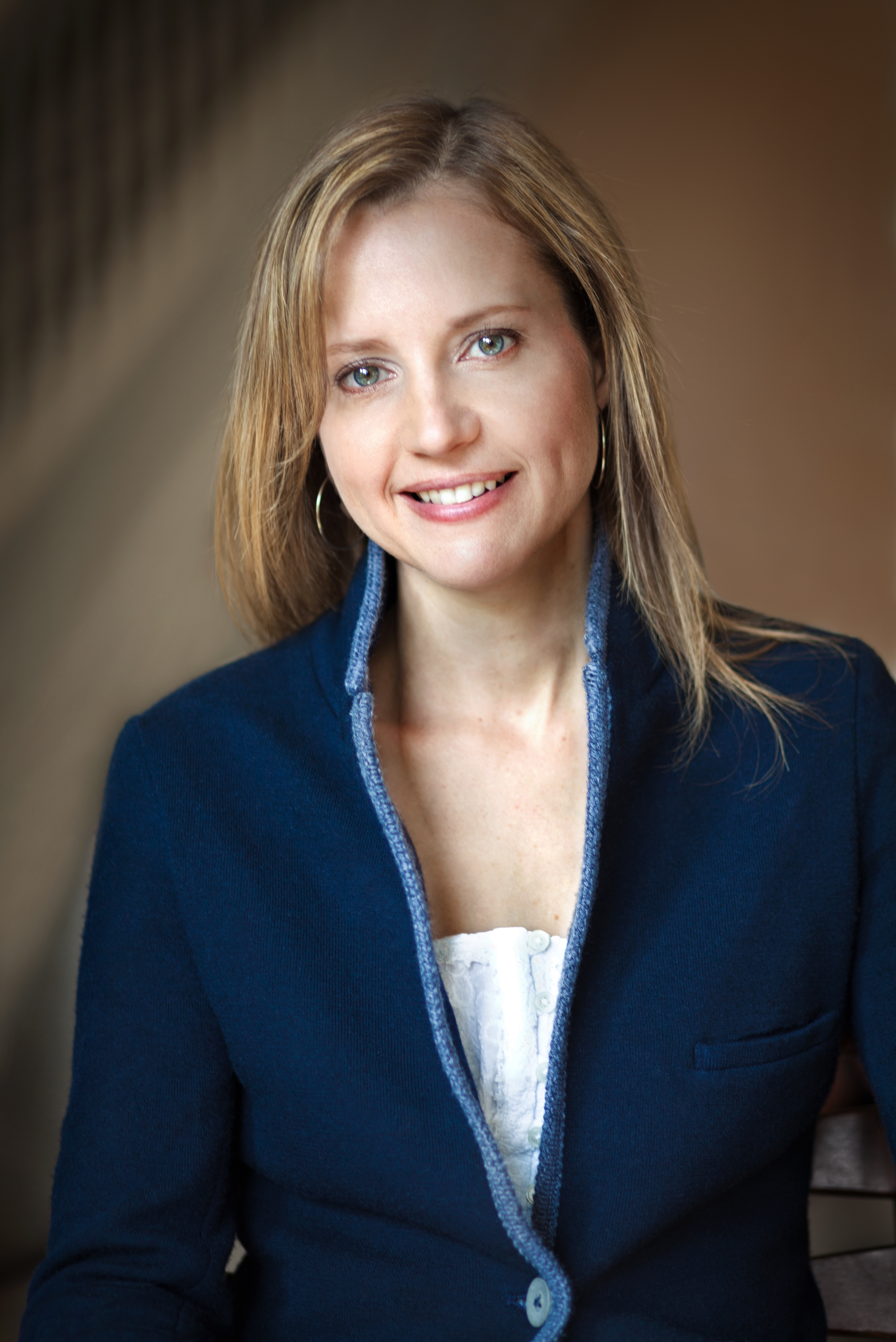
- Born: October 1969 (age 56); Scarborough, Ontario, Canada
- Education: McMaster University; London School of Hygiene and Tropical Medicine
- Known for: Author, physician, founder and executive director of War Child Canada / War Child USA
- Spouse: Eric Hoskins
- Children: Rhys

Samantha Joan Nutt CM OOnt (born October 1969) is a Canadian physician and philanthropist who is the founder and president of War Child Canada. She has more than sixteen years of experience working in war zones. Her 2011 book Damned Nations: Greed, Guns, Armies and Aid details her work over the course of fifteen years in some of the most devastated regions of the world.

Throughout her career, Nutt has focused on providing assistance to war-affected women and children. She is the founder and president of War Child Canada/War Child USA and has worked with the United Nations and non-governmental organizations. Nutt has worked with children and their families on the front-line of many crises including Iraq, Afghanistan, The Democratic Republic of Congo, Liberia, Sierra Leone, Somalia, Darfur, South Sudan, Burundi, northern Uganda, Ethiopia and the Thai-Burmese border.

Nutt is on staff at Women's College Hospital in Toronto and is an assistant professor at the University of Toronto in the Department of Family and Community Medicine. She is also on the board of the David Suzuki Foundation. She is married to Eric Hoskins, formerly Ontario's minister of health and long term care.

== Education ==
Born in Toronto in October 1969, Nutt lived near the town of Durban, South Africa, from the ages one through six years, before she and her family returned to the city. Her father was a children's shoe designer and his work took the family to Brazil for six months when Nutt was in her early teens. She graduated from McMaster University's Arts & Science Program. She received her Doctor of Medicine degree from the same university. She also earned an MSc degree with distinction at the London School of Hygiene and Tropical Medicine, and holds a Fellowship in Community Medicine (FRCPC) from the Royal College of Physicians and Surgeons of Canada. She is certified by the College of Family Practice (CCFP) and completed a sub-specialization in women's health through the University of Toronto as a Women's Health Scholar. As a practising family physician she is a fellow of the Royal College of Physicians and Surgeons and is certified by the College of Family Medicine.

== Honours ==
Nutt's work on behalf of war-affected communities around the world has been widely recognized. In 2011, she was made a Member of the Order of Canada "for her contributions to improving the plight of young people in the world's worst conflict zones, notably as a founder of War Child Canada." She was named one of "Canada’s Top 40 under 40" award from The Globe and Mail. Time magazine called her one of "Canada’s Five Leading Activists". She was chosen as "Personnalité De La Semaine" by La Presse and was chosen as one of "200 Young Global Leaders" in the world by the World Economic Forum. In 2010, Nutt was appointed to the Order of Ontario. In 2012 she was presented with the Queen Elizabeth II Diamond Jubilee Medal.

Nutt has received honorary doctorates from Niagara University, Brock University (Doctor of Humane Letters), Nova Southeastern University in Florida, McMaster University (Doctor of Laws), University of Lethbridge, St Mary's University in Halifax, University of Western Ontario and the University of Ottawa. In 2011 she received honorary doctorates from Mount Saint Vincent University and York University (Doctor of Laws). In 2015, she received an honorary degree of doctor of science from University of Alberta.

== Activities outside of War Child Canada ==
Nutt has written for Maclean's magazine and The Globe and Mail covering human rights, foreign policy, and war-related issues. She frequently appears on television and radio in Canada and the US as a commentator on war and human rights issues. She was a regular member of The National's "Turning Point" panel. She is also a keynote public speaker on the impact of war, human rights, social justice and on public engagement in global issues.
