= Danuta Gleed Literary Award =

Annual Canadian literary award

- Awarded for: Canadian short fiction collections
- Country: Canada
- Presented by: Writers' Union of Canada
- First award: 1998

The Danuta Gleed Literary Award is a Canadian national literary prize, awarded since 1998. It recognizes the best debut short fiction collection by a Canadian author in English language. The annual prize was founded by John Gleed in honour of his late wife, the Canadian writer Danuta Gleed, whose favourite literary genre was short fiction, and is presented by the Writers' Union of Canada. The incomes of her One for the Chosen, a collection of short stories published posthumously in 1997 by BuschekBooks and released by Frances Itani and Susan Zettell, assist in funding the award.

Initially Can$5,000, the prize money increased to Can$10,000 in 2004. The runners-up each receive CAN $500. The nominations must be submitted before the end of January. The year's shortlist is chosen by a jury. The varying jury is composed of Canadian writers, literary critics and publishers, such as Gail Anderson-Dargatz, Robin McGrath and Hal Niedzviecki in 2012 or Douglas Glover, J. Jill Robinson and Claire Holden Rothman in 2011.

The first winning work was Curtis Gillespie's The Progress of an Object in Motion.

In 2010, Joey Comeau's Overqualified was withdrawn, as the writer already published a debut work. Only two books were shortlisted in 2010 (the fewest in the history of the award). However, the 2010 judges called the winning work Wax Boats by Sarah Roberts "truly remarkable," speaking of her versatility and her convincing writing in every conceivable voice, and likening her to Stephen Leacock's Sunshine Sketches of a Little Town for the modern age.

== Winners and nominees ==
Key
Color	Meaning
	Winners
	Runners-up
	Other short-listed people

Year Awarded	Author(s)	Book	Publisher	Ref.
1998	Curtis Gillespie	The Progress of an Object in Motion	Coteau Books	
1998	Joanne Gerber	In the Misleading Absence of Light	Coteau Books	
1998	Janina Hornosty	Snackers	Oolichan Books	
1998	Shree Ghatage	Awake When All the World is Asleep	House of Anansi Press	
1998	David Manicom	Ice in Dark Water	Véhicule Press	
1999	Dennis Bock	Olympia	Bloomsbury USA	
1999	Judith Kalman	The County of Birches	Douglas & McIntyre	
1999	Murray Logan	The King of Siam	The Porcupine's Quill	
1999	Anne Fleming	Pool-Hopping and Other Stories	Polestar	
1999	Nora Gold	Marrow and Other Stories	Warwick Publishing	
1999	Sally Ito	Floating the Shore	The Mercury Press	
2000	Mike Barnes	Aquarium	The Porcupine's Quill	
2000	Elyse Gasco	Can You Wave Bye-Bye, Baby?	Picador	
2000	Russell Smith	Young Men	Anchor Canada	
2000	Zsuzsi Gartner	All the Anxious Girls on Earth	Patrick Crean Editions	
2000	Maureen Hull	Righteous Living	Turnstone Press	
2000	Alissa York	Any Given Power	Arbeiter Ring Publishing	
2001	Barbara Lambert	A Message for Mr. Lazarus	Cormorant Books	
2001	Ivan E. Coyote	Close to Spiderman	Arsenal Pulp Press	
2001	Terence Young	Rhymes with Useless	Raincoast Books	
2001	Alexandra Leggat	Pull Gently, Tear Here	Insomniac Press	
2001	Annabel Lyon	Oxygen	McClelland & Stewart	
2002	Gloria Sawai	A Song for Nettie Johnson	Coteau Books	
2002	Rick Maddocks	Sputnik Diner	Knopf Canada	
2002	Madeleine Thien	Simple Recipes	Little Brown & Company	
2002	Aislinn Hunter	What's Left Us	Polestar Book Publishers	
2002	Nadine McInnes	Quicksilver	Raincoast Books	
2002	Adam Lewis Schroeder	Kingdom of Monkeys	Raincoast Books	
2003	Lee Henderson	The Broken Record Technique	Penguin Canada	
2003	Timothy Taylor	Silent Cruise	Counterpoint	
2003	Nancy Lee	Dead Girls	McClelland & Stewart	
2003	Tamas Dobozy	When X Equals Marylou	Arsenal Pulp Press	
2003	Shaena Lambert	The Falling Woman	Vintage Canada	
2003	Emily Schultz	Black Coffee Night	Insomniac Press	
2004	Jacqueline Baker	A Hard Witching & Other Stories	Harper Flamingo Canada	
2004	Jonathan Bennett	Veranda People	Raincoast Books	
2004	Susan Rendell	In the Chambers of the Sea	Killick Press	
2004	Kathryn Kuitenbrouwer	Way Up: Stories	Goose Lane Editions	
2004	Cory Doctorow	A Place So Foreign and 8 More	Four Walls Eight Windows	
2004	Melanie Little	Confidence: Stories	Thomas Allen Publishers	
2005	David Bezmozgis	Natasha and Other Stories	Harper Flamingo Canada	
2005	Ramona Dearing	So Beautiful	The Porcupine's Quill	
2005	Kelly Cooper	Eyehill	Goose Lane Editions	
2005	Caroline Shepard	Off Centre	Oberon Press	
2005	Carrie Snyder	Hair Hat	Penguin Canada	
2006	Charlotte Gill	Ladykiller	Thomas Allen Publishers	
2006	Craig Davidson	Rust and Bone	Viking Canada	
2006	Jacqueline Honnet	Limbo	Turnstone Press	
2006	Goran Simic	Yesterday's People	Biblioasis	
2006	Vivette Kady	Most Wanted	The Porcupine's Quill	
2007	Nathan Sellyn	Indigenous Beasts	Raincoast Books	
2007	Vincent Lam	Bloodletting and Miraculous Cures	Doubleday	
2007	Russell Wangersky	The Hour of Bad Decisions	Coteau Books	
2007	Anar Ali	Baby Khaki's Wings	Penguin Canada	
2007	Krista Bridge	The Virgin Spy	Douglas & McIntyre	
2008	Andrew Hood	Pardon Our Monsters	Esplanade Books	
2008	Roberta Rees	Long After Fathers	Coteau Books	
2008	Valeria Stetson	The Year I Got Impatient	Oolichan Books	
2008	Liane Keightley	Seven Openings of the Head	Conundrum Press	
2008	Tom Wayman	Boundary Country	Thistledown Press	
2009	Pasha Malla	The Withdrawal Method	House of Anansi Press	
2009	Ian Colford	Halifax for Evidence	The Porcupine's Quill	
2009	Rebecca Rosenblum	Once	Biblioasis	
2009	Ahmad Saidullah	Happiness and other Disorders	Key Porter Books	
2009	Betsy Trumpener	The Butcher of Penetang	Caitlin Press	
2010	Sarah Roberts	Wax Boats	Caitlin Press	
2010	Deborah Willis	Vanishing and Other Stories	Penguin Canada	
2010	Joey Comeau	Overqualified (withdrawn)^{1}	ECW Press	
2011	Billie Livingston	Greedy Little Eyes	Vintage Canada	
2011	Darcie Friesen Hossack	Mennonites Don't Dance	Thistledown Press	
2011	Alexander MacLeod	Light Lifting	Biblioasis	
2011	R. W. Gray	Crisp	NeWest Press	
2011	Teri Vlassopoulos	Bats or Swallows	Invisible Publishing	
2012	Ian Williams	Not Anyone's Anything	Freehand Books	
2012	Jessica Westhead	And Also Sharks	Cormorant Books	
2012	Daniel Griffin	Stopping for Strangers	Véhicule Press	
2012	Andrew J. Borkowski	Copernicus Avenue	Cormorant Books	
2012	Johanna Skibsrud	This Will Be Difficult to Explain	Hamish Hamilton Canada	
2013	Rebecca Lee	Bobcat and Other Stories	Hamish Hamilton	
2013	Anton Piatigorsky	The Iron Bridge	Goose Lane Editions	
2013	John Vigna	Bull Head	Arsenal Pulp Press	
2013	Paul Marlowe	Ether Frolics	Sybertooth	
2013	Yasuko Thanh	Floating Like the Dead	McClelland & Stewart	
2014	Paul Carlucci	The Secret Life of Fission	Oberon Press	
2014	Astrid Blodgett	You Haven't Changed a Bit	University of Alberta Press	
2014	Eufemia Fantetti	A Recipe for Disaster & Other Unlikely Tales of Love	Mother Tongue Publishing	
2014	Theodora Armstrong	Clear Skies, No Wind, 100% Visibility	House of Anansi	
2014	Lisa Bird-Wilson	Just Pretending	Coteau Books	
2015	Rivka Galchen	American Innovations	HarperCollins	
2015	Eliza Robertson	Wallflowers	Hamish Hamilton	
2015	Mireille Silcoff	Chez l'Arabe	House of Anansi	
2015	Claire Battershill	Circus	McClelland and Stewart	
2015	Janine Alyson Young	Hideout Hotel	Caitlin Press	
2016	Heather O'Neill	Daydreams of Angels	HarperCollins	
2016	Andrew Forbes	What You Need	Invisible Publishing	
2016	Kevin Hardcastle	Debris	Biblioasis	
2016	Gerard Beirne	In a Time of Drought and Hunger	Oberon Press	
2016	Hugh Graham	Last Words	Exile Editions	
2017	Kris Bertin	Bad Things Happen	Biblioasis	
2017	Kerry Lee Powell	Willem deKooning's Paintbrush	HarperCollins	
2017	Laura Trunkey	Double Dutch	Astoria	
2017	Lyse Champagne	The Light That Remains	Enfield & Wizenty	
2017	André Narbonne	Twelve Miles to Midnight	Black Moss Press	
2018	Norma Dunning	Annie Muktuk and Other Stories	University of Alberta Press	
2018	Dawn Dumont	Glass Beads	Thistledown Press	
2018	David Huebert	Peninsula Sinking	Biblioasis	
2018	Camilla Grudova	The Doll's Alphabet	Coach House Books	
2018	Lori McNulty	Life on Mars	Goose Lane Editions	
2019	Carrianne Leung	That Time I Loved You	HarperCollins	
2019	Paige Cooper	Zolitude	Biblioasis	
2019	Erin Frances Fisher	That Tiny Life	House of Anansi	
2019	Djamila Ibrahim	Things Are Good Now	House of Anansi	
2019	Marianne Micros	Eye	Guernica Editions	
2020	Zalika Reid-Benta	Frying Plantain	Astoria	
2020	Christy Ann Conlin	Watermark	Astoria	
2020	Terry Doyle	Dig	Breakwater Books	
2020	Darci Bysouth	Lost Boys	Thistledown Press	
2020	Kat Cameron	The Eater of Dreams	Thistledown Press	
2021	Jack Wang	We Two Alone	Astoria	
2021	Kaie Kellough	Dominoes at the Crossroads	Esplanade Books	
2021	Souvankham Thammavongsa	How to Pronounce Knife	McClelland & Stewart	
2021	Frances Boyle	Seeking Shade	The Porcupine's Quill	
2021	Sidura Ludwig	You Are Not What We Expected	Astoria	
2022	Arnolda Dufour Bowes	20.12m: A Short Story Collection of a Life Lived as a Road Allowance Métis	Gabriel Dumont Institute Press	
2022	Silmy Abdullah	Home of the Floating Lily	Dundurn Press	
2022	Gillian Wigmore	Night Watch: The Vet Suite	Invisible Publishing	
2022	Helen Chau Bradley	Personal Attention Roleplay	Metonymy Press	
2022	Meg Todd	Exit Strategies	Signature Editions	
2023	Kim Fu	Lesser Known Monsters of the 21st Century	Coach House Books	
2023	Nada Alic	Bad Thoughts	Vintage Books	
2023	Saeed Teebi	Her First Palestinian	House of Anansi Press	
2023	Kathy Friedman	All the Shining People	House of Anansi Press	
2023	Rawi Hage	Stray Dogs	Knopf Canada	
2024	Lisa Alward	Cocktail	Biblioasis	
2024	Paola Ferrante	Her Body Among Animals	Book*hug	
2024	Rebecca Hirsch Garcia	The Girl Who Cried Diamonds & Other Stories	ECW Press	
2024	Idman Nur Omar	The Private Apartments	House of Anansi Press	
2024	Kathryn Mockler	Anecdotes	Book*hug	
2025	Canisia Lubrin	Code Noir	Knopf Canada/Penguin Random House	
2025	Vincent Anioke	Perfect Little Angels	Arsenal Pulp Press	
2025	Nicola Winstanley	Smoke	Buckrider Books	
2025	Billy-Ray Belcourt	Coexistence	Hamish Hamilton/Penguin Random House	
2025	Shashi Bhat	Death by a Thousand Cuts	McClelland & Stewart/Penguin Random House	
2026	Caitlin Galway	A Song for Wildcats	Rare Machines/Dundurn Press	
2026	Catherine Hunter	Seeing You Home	Signature Editions/Véhicule Press	
2026	Mikka Jacobsen	Good Victory	Freehand Books	
2026	Tracey Lindberg	The Cree Word for Love: Sâkihitowin	HarperAvenue/Harpercollins Canada	
2026	Leila Marshy	My Thievery of the People	Baraka Books	

1. Comeau's Overqualified was withdrawn as it was not his debut short fiction collection. He already self-published It’s Too Late to Say I’m Sorry in 2007.
