= Goose Lane Editions =

Canadian book publishing company

- Predecessor: Fiddlehead Poetry Books
- Founded: 1954
- Country of origin: Canada
- Headquarters location: Fredericton, New Brunswick
- Distribution: UTP Distribution
- Publication types: Books
- Imprints: icehouse poetry, BTC Audiobooks
- Official website: gooselane.com

Goose Lane Editions is a Canadian book publishing company founded in 1954 in Fredericton, New Brunswick as Fiddlehead Poetry Books by Fred Cogswell and a group of students and faculty from the University of New Brunswick associated with The Fiddlehead. After Cogswell retired in 1981, his successor, Peter Thomas, changed the name to Goose Lane Editions. From 1989 to 1997 Douglas Lochhead was president of Goose Lane. It is now headed by publisher and co-owner Susanne Alexander. The Canada Council for the Arts says the publishing company "has evolved to become one of Canada's most exciting showcases of home-grown literary talent."

Publications from Goose Lane Editions include literary fiction, poetry, biographies, works of history, travel literature, outdoor travel guides and serious non-fiction, as well as fine art volumes that it often publishes in association with museums and galleries.

Authors published by Goose Lane include Alden Nowlan, Richard Kelly Kemick, Nancy Bauer, Herb Curtis, Reg Balch, Andrew Boden, Lynn Coady, Alan Cumyn, Sheree Fitch, Kerry Clare, Jeffery Donaldson, Herménégilde Chiasson, Lynn Davies, Tammy Armstrong, Kathryn Kuitenbrouwer, Catherine Bush, Noah Richler, Jacques Poitras, Tamai Kobayashi, Douglas Glover, Joan Thomas, Riel Nason, and Marcello Di Cintio.

== Awards ==
- 2003 - Governor General's Award for English-language fiction, Douglas Glover Elle
- 2009 - Commonwealth Writers Prize for Best First Book (Canada and the Caribbean), Joan Thomas Reading by Lightning
- 2012 - Commonwealth Book Prize (Canada and Europe), Riel Nason The Town That Drowned
- 2013 - Shaughnessy Cohen Award for Political Writing, Marcello Di Cintio Walls: Travels Along the Barricades
- 2022 - Atwood Gibson Writers' Trust Fiction Prize, Nicholas Herring Some Hellish
- 2026 - Giller Prize, Nicholas Herring Your Breath in Charcoal

== Executive ==
- Carmelita Thompson O'Neill, Chair of the Board of Directors
- Susanne Alexander, President and Publisher
- Julie Scriver, Vice-President and Creative Director
