= Donald Jack =

English Canadian writer

Donald Lamont Jack (6 December 1924 – 2 June 2003) was an English and Canadian novelist and playwright.

== Life ==
Jack was born in Radcliffe, Bury, England and grew up in Britain, attending the well regarded Bury Grammar School and Marr College and later serving in the RAF in World War II (1943–47).

After the war he emigrated to Canada in 1951, and became a Canadian citizen in 1964. From 1955 to 1957 he was a scriptwriter for Crawley Films. After 1957 he became a full-time freelance writer.

He wrote for the stage, radio, and for television programs such as General Motors Theatre, The Unforeseen, Playdate, Hatch's Mill, The Forest Rangers, and On Camera, but he is most famous for his novels, the Bandy Papers, which recount the humorous adventures of Bartholomew Bandy, a World War I fighter pilot. His play The Canvas Barricade was the first Canadian play produced at the Stratford Festival of Canada. Other stage plays included Exit Muttering, Crash, and Minuet for Brass Band. He had 39 TV plays produced, 22 radio plays, and numerous documentaries. Most of Jack's book-length works are being re-published, or published for the first time, by Sybertooth.

Jack died of a stroke at his home in Warwickshire, England in June 2003.

== The Bandy Papers series ==
- Three Cheers for Me – 1962 (Winner of the 1963 Stephen Leacock Award)
- Three Cheers for Me (revised & expanded edition) – 1973
- That's Me in the Middle – 1973 (Winner of the 1974 Stephen Leacock Award)
- It's Me Again - 1975 (Also published as two volumes, It's Me Again & Me Among the Ruins)
- Me Bandy, You Cissie - 1979 (Winner of the 1980 Stephen Leacock Award)
- Me Too - 1983
- This One's on Me - 1987
- Me So Far – 1989
- Hitler Versus Me: The Return of Bartholomew Bandy – 1996
- Stalin Versus Me – 2005
- Hitler Versus Me paperback combining H vs M with the author's novelette, "Where Did Rafe Madison Go?" – 2006
- Me Bandy, You Cissie paperback combining the novel with the author's radio play Banner's Headline – 2009
- Three Cheers for Me 50th anniversary edition of the original 1962 version, with a foreword by Paul Marlowe – 2011

== Other published works ==
- Exit Muttering – 1972
- Sinc, Betty and the Morning Man – 1977 (non-fiction)
- Rogues, Rebels, and Geniuses: The Story of Canadian Medicine – 1981 (non-fiction)
- The Canvas Barricade – 2007 (stage play)

== Stageplays ==
- Humbly, for Fyodor (1953)
- Minuet for Brass Band (1953) A 3-act play first performed at the Canadian Theatre School in Toronto, founded by Sterndale Bennett.
- Flamacue Serenade
- The Canvas Barricade (1961) A 2-act comedy about an artist defying materialism. Set on the Quebec-Ontario border, and in Toronto. Performed in 1961 at the Stratford Festival, where it was the first original Canadian play performed. Music by Harry Freedman
- Exit Muttering (1962) A 2-act comedy first performed at the Grenville Street Playhouse, directed by Hugh Webster, with set design by Vincent Vaitiekunas. Published 1974.
- Reckless (1969/1971)
- Folly (1985) Alternate titles: Love in Business Hours; Pension Play.
- Blast (1988) Comedy about espionage at an English country house.
- Crash A 2-act comedy about a timpanist who inherits a funeral home. First performed at the Ontario Playwrights' Showcase.

== Radio Plays ==
- Three Cheers for Me (CBC Theatre 10:30, 1972)
- Your Tiny Head is Frozen (for CBC Stage)
- Grave Tidings (for Sunday Theatre)
- Banner's Headline
- More Joy in Heaven (dramatization of Morley Callaghan's novel for Theatre 10:30)
