= Taxi Girl (urban legend) =

Brazilian urban legend

The Taxi Girl (in Portuguese, Moça do Táxi or Garota do Táxi), also called the Taxi Woman (Mulher do Táxi), is a Brazilian urban legend, forming part of the folklore of the city of Belém, in the state of Pará. According to the most popular version of this tale, the spirit of a young woman appears on the streets of Belém requesting a taxi ride, and subsequently instructs the driver to collect the fare from her father. Upon arriving at the indicated address, the driver discovers that the young woman has already passed away. The apparition is said to occur always on the anniversary of her birth, a date on which she used to travel around the city by taxi while she was alive.

The purported "taxi girl" is identified as Josephina Conte, a real woman who lived during the first half of the 20th century and passed away at the age of sixteen, a victim of tuberculosis. According to the story, Conte was always gifted by her father on her birthday with a taxi ride through the main landmarks of Belém. The book Visagens e Assombrações de Belém, published in 1972 by Walcyr Monteiro, further popularized the legend. In 2017, the photographer from Pará, Walda Marques, created a photonovel entitled Josefina, a moça do táxi, inspired by the legend. The grave of Conte is a popular site of religious pilgrimage, where, on her photograph affixed to the headstone, a brooch in the shape of a car is fastened to her clothing.
