= Andrew Boden =

Andrew Boden may refer to:

- Andrew Boden (politician) (died 1835), American politician
- Andrew Boden (writer), Canadian writer
