= Gabriella Goliger =

Canadian novelist and short story writer (born 1949)

Gabriella Goliger (born 1949) is a Canadian novelist and short story writer. She was co-winner of the Journey Prize in 1997 for her short story "Maladies of the Inner Ear", and has since published three books: Song of Ascent in 2001, Girl Unwrapped in 2010, which won the Ottawa Book Award for Fiction, and Eva Salomon's War, which was published in 2018 and received praise from novelists Joan Thomas and Francis Itani.

She is Jewish.

Goliger also won the Prism International Award in 1993, and was a finalist for the Journey Prize again in 1995. She has been published in a number of journals and anthologies including Best New American Voices in 2000 and Contemporary Jewish Writing in Canada.

Born in Italy, Goliger grew up in Montreal, Quebec, where she obtained a B.A. in English Literature at McGill University. She later obtained an M.A. in English Literature from the Hebrew University of Jerusalem. She has lived in Israel, the Eastern Arctic, and Victoria, British Columbia. Ottawa, Ontario has been her home for the past 30 years. She has lived with her partner, Carleton University academic Barbara Freeman, for almost three decades; they've been married since 2006.

== Works ==
- Song of Ascent (2001)
- Girl Unwrapped (2010)
- Eva Salomon's War (2018)
