= A Softer World =

Webcomic by Joey Comeau and Emily Horne

- Author(s): Joey Comeau, Emily Horne
- Website: www.asofterworld.com
- Current status/schedule: Concluded
- Launch date: 7 February 2003
- End date: 1 June 2015
- Genre(s): Dark humor, surreal humor, photo comic

A Softer World is a webcomic by the writer Joey Comeau and artist Emily Horne, both Canadians. It was first published online on 7 February 2003 and was released three times a week until its end in June 2015. Before starting the website in 2003, the comics had been published in zine form. With the launch of the website, the comic gained wider recognition, most notably when Warren Ellis linked to the comic on his blog, and then began to feature it as a "Favored Puny Human". It appeared in The Guardian for a short time until a change of editors caused it to be removed. Between 2008 and 2010, science fiction-themed strips of A Softer World were also produced and published on Tor.com.

== Format ==
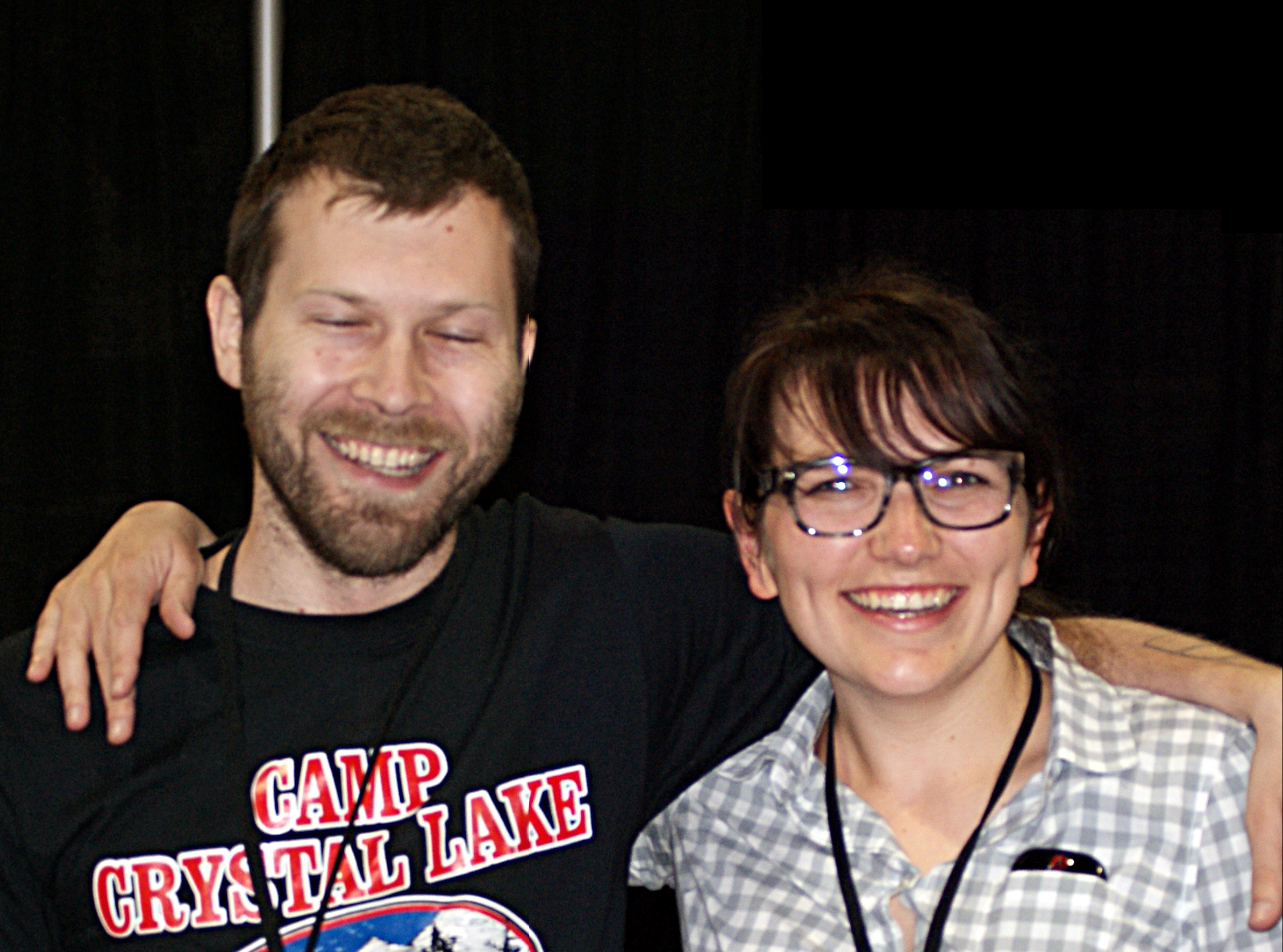
Comeau and Horne

With occasional exceptions for double-length strips, each comic is three panels long. The three panels are made up of photographic art, either a series of three photographs, or one photograph that is spread over multiple frames, or repeated with different crops and zooms. Short text is added over the photographs. The photos do not illustrate the text directly, instead presenting a similar tone, or being in conflict.

The strip grew out of work by Comeau that started in 2001 which used magazine about royalty as the illustrations. The photographs for A Softer World were taken by Horne, then sent to Comeau for text. Horne said that the two were more collaborative when they lived in the same city and the process for making the strips changed when Horne moved away.

The tone of the comic tends to be absurdist and dark, with the punchlines often being both humorous and disturbing. Horne stated that "Even those [strips] that are overtly hilarious usually manage to make you feel a bit guilty about your laughter. ... Few things are black-and-white, funny-or-not-funny, and ASW reflects that." The strip occasionally features text with overt sexual content; for example, the strip from which the comic's title comes from reads, "In the caves behind my house, I found a softer world. / They understand what I had to do for love. / They don't believe in restraining orders." Recurring themes include sexuality, accidents or disasters, and the supernatural.

Hovering one's cursor over the comic will prompt the image title to appear, which contains an extra punchline or commentary related to the strip overall. In May 2010, a feature was added to display this text when clicking or tapping on the comic image, for users on mobile phones and touchscreen devices, which lack a "hovering" function. In hardcopy versions, the extra text appeared under the comic.

== Reception ==
In a 2004 review, Dani Atkinson wrote for Sequential Tart: "The strips read like the first lines of a novel, the kind of really good first lines that manage to evoke the whole novel. Or a sort of ... post-modern haiku. They're blackly funny, or oddly touching, or creepy."

The website The Webcomics Examiner included A Softer World in its list of 25 "Best Webcomics of 2005", saying "the sly inferences in each Softer World strip are variously acidic, achingly funny, or casually disturbing." The comic won the first Web Cartoonists' Choice Award for photographic webcomic in 2007.

A Softer World was profiled in the September 2007 issue of the Australian Rolling Stone.

In a 2008 article for ComicMix, reviewer Rick Marshall said the strip "is always a gamble. One strip can prompt hysterical laughter, while the next can only make you shiver and wonder what the unholy hell was going on in its creators' minds when that strip was conceived. ASW can explore complex social issues one moment and the depth of depravity in the next."

Writing after the final strip, Gary Tyrrel of Fleen called the series "one thousand two hundred and forty-three perfect little pillows of hope/despair, melancholy/sanguinity, [and] sexiness/moresexiness".

== Other features of the site ==
The website asofterworld.com was also used to host other creative works by Horne and Comeau:

- "i blame the sea" is Emily Horne's photo journal, added to the site in 2008 and updated weekly.
- "Overqualified" is a series of satirical cover letters for job applications. These cover letters are generally written so as to reveal a degree of insanity in the imagined author. For example, one is a letter from someone applying to be a mall Santa Claus, in which he explains that, as a foreman at Mattel, he fired all the middle aged men and hired midgets who he forced to wear green costumes, and that, after being fired, he broke into houses to steal milk and cookies. Overqualified was published in book form in 2009.
- "i am other people" is a series of interviews that Joey conducts with people.
- Lockpick Pornography, Comeau's first novel, was first serialized on the A Softer World website before publication.

== Collected editions ==
- Truth and Beauty Bombs (book 1) (Loose Teeth, 2006; TopatoCo, 2011)
- Second Best Isn't So Bad (book 2) (TopatoCo, 2009)
- Everybody Gets Got (book 3) (TopatoCo, 2012)
- Let's Do Something Wrong (book 4) (TopatoCo, 2013)
- Anatomy of Melancholy (Best-of collection) (Breadpig, 2016)

== See also ==
- Photo comics
