= Francis Boyle (disambiguation) =

Francis Boyle (1950–2025) was an American professor of international law at the University of Illinois.

Francis Boyle may also refer to:

- Francis Boyle, 1st Viscount Shannon (1623–1699), Privy Counsellor of Ireland
- Francis J. Boyle (1927–2006), U.S. federal judge
- Frank Boyle (born 1945), Democratic Party member of the Wisconsin State Assembly
- Frankie Boyle (born 1972), Scottish comedian

== See also ==
- Frances Boyle (born 1954), Canadian writer
