= Darwin's Bastards =

Science fiction story anthology

First edition Cover art by Peter Cocking

Darwin's Bastards: Astounding Tales from Tomorrow is a 2010 anthology of dystopian science fiction stories. It was edited by Zsuzsi Gartner, and published by Douglas & McIntyre. All of its stories were written by Canadians.

== Contributors ==
- Adam Lewis Schroeder
- Annabel Lyon
- Anosh Irani
- Buffy Cram
- David Whitton
- Douglas Coupland
- Elyse Friedman
- Heather O'Neill
- Jay Brown
- Jessica Grant
- Laura Trunkey
- Lee Henderson
- Mark Anthony Jarman
- Matthew J. Trafford
- Neil Smith
- Oliver Kellhammer
- Pasha Malla
- Paul Carlucci
- Sheila Heti
- Stephen Marche
- Timothy Taylor
- William Gibson
- Yann Martel

== Critical reception ==
The Los Angeles Times stated that the stories were of varying degrees of originality, but emphasized that "the quality of writing across the collection is wonderfully high". The Globe and Mail called it "excellent", and CBC Radio ranked it as the best Canadian work of science fiction and fantasy for 2010, while the Georgia Straight described the scenarios in the collection as "dismal", "grim", and "genuinely scarifying", while specifying that the collection as a whole is "riotously enjoyable".

Quill and Quire, however, criticized Gartner's editorial decision to mostly exclude science fiction authors with genre experience in favor of primarily literary contributors, stating that many of the collection's "futuristic and dystopian speculations hang suspended like colloids in slack, unformed narratives", and observing that the contributors seem to "have not read very widely in the genre", with the result that many of the scenarios portrayed "feel second-hand at best". Similarly, Geist concluded that "(m)any of the stories (...) try too hard", and that "(t)he quality and originality vary wildly".
