= Sybertooth =

Sybertooth is a Canadian book publishing company based in Sackville, New Brunswick. They publish fiction, non-fiction, stage plays, and poetry.

Some of the authors published by Sybertooth include Leacock medal winner Donald Jack, poet laureate of Sackville, NB Douglas Lochhead, K. V. Johansen, cartoonist Steven Appleby, Leacock medal winner and broadcaster Max Ferguson, Shelagh Rogers, Rae Bridgman, PG Wodehouse scholar Norman Murphy, and Paul Marlowe.
