= Jean Marc Ah-Sen =

Canadian writer

Jean Marc Ah-Sen is a Canadian writer from Toronto, Ontario, whose experimental short story collection In the Beggarly Style of Imitation was a finalist for the Toronto Book Awards in 2020.

Ah-Sen published his debut novel Grand Menteur in 2015, and followed up with In the Beggarly Style of Imitation in 2020.

In 2021, Ah-Sen, Emily Anglin, Lee Henderson and Devon Code published Disintegration in Four Parts, a volume collecting one novella by each of the four writers.
