= Numéro Cinq =

Former online art journal

Numéro Cinq was an online international journal of arts and letters founded in 2010 by the Governor-General's Award-winning Canadian novelist Douglas Glover. Numéro Cinq published a wide variety of new and established artists and writers with a bent toward the experimental, hybrid works, and work in translation as well as essays on the craft and art of writing. Its last issue appeared in August 2017.

== History ==
The magazine's name comes from Glover's short story “The Obituary Writer” (published in his collection Bad News of the Heart). The hero, based loosely on the author as a young newspaperman, harasses a neighbour by making loud noises in the night and pretending to be a member of a sinister terrorist group called Numéro Cinq.

=== Founder and Editor, Douglas Glover ===
Douglas Glover, who currently lives in central Vermont, was raised on a tobacco farm in southwestern Ontario. He studied philosophy at York University then received a M.Litt. in philosophy from the University of Edinburgh. He also received an M.F.A from the University of Iowa's Iowa Writer's Workshop. He has published five collections of short stories, four novels, and two books of non-fiction. His stories have appeared in Best Canadian Stories, The Best American Short Stories, and The Oxford Book of Canadian Stories. In 2003, Glover's novel Elle won the Governor-General's Award for fiction and was a finalist for the IMPAC Dublin Literary Award. He has been a newspaper reporter, a philosophy professor, a writing professor and an editor. He is currently on faculty at the MFA in Writing program at Vermont College of Fine Arts.

=== Recognition ===
Sion Dayson's essay "Life Lessons in Père Lachaise Cemetery" selected for inclusion in Utne Reader, The Best of the Alternative Press, July/August Issue, 2012.

Melissa Fisher's essay "My First Job" won the 2012 3 Quarks Daily Arts & Literature Prize judged by Gish Gen.

=== Contributors ===
Numéro Cinq has published stories, poems, creative non-fiction, sermons, plays, screenplays, photographs, and art work by new and established writers and artists.

American writers include: Madison Smartt Bell, Lydia Davis, Sam Savage, Steve Almond, Dodie Bellamy, Jen Bervin, Eula Biss, Jody Bolz, David Ferry, Rigoberto González, Donald Hall, Noy Holland, Shane Jones, Pierre Joris, Gordon Lish, Micheline Aharonian Marcom, Joseph McElroy, Greg Mulcahy, David Wojahn, Robert Wrigley, Diane Williams, William Olsen, Nancy Eimers, Brad Watson, Anthony Doerr, Keith Lee Morris, Darin Strauss, Trinie Dalton, Nance Van Winckel, Joe David Bellamy, Jess Row, Sydney Lea, David Rivard, Donald Breckenridge, Leslie Ullman, Johannah Rodgers, Jeremy Brunger, Richard Jackson, Dawn Raffel, Russell Working, Lynne Tillman, Jack Myers, and Domenic Stansberry.

Canadian writers include: Leon Rooke, Diane Schoemperlen, Mavis Gallant, Bill Gaston, Mark Anthony Jarman, Ann Ireland, David Helwig, Mike Barnes, Danila Botha, Michael Bryson, John B. Lee, Karen Mulhallen, Stephen Henighan, Genni Gunn, Goran Simic, Dave Margoshes, Keith Maillard, Cynthia Flood, Tess Fragoulis, Clark Blaise, Steven Heighton, Connie Gault, R. W. Gray, David Homel, Kathryn Kuitenbrouwer, Gilles Pellerin, Dawn Promislow, Lee D. Thompson, Ian Colford, Jack Hodgins, and S.D. Chrostowska.

From the UK: Andrew Gallix, Gabriel Josipovici, Fernando Sdrigotti, Victoria Best, Martin Dean, Joanna Walsh, and George Szirtes.

Work in translation includes: Quim Monzó, Juan José Saer, Jorge Carrera Andrade, Viktor Shklovsky, Cesare Pavese, Kazushi Hosaka, Anton Chekhov, Mihail Sebastian, Giacomo Leopardi, Habib Tengour, Besik Kharanauli, Rilke, Blanca Castellón, Horace, Liliana Heker, Andrzej Stasiuk, Rilke, Guillaume Apollinaire, Paul-Armand Silvestre, Paul Éluard and Mathias Énard.
