= Wallflowers (short story collection) =

2014 short story collection by Eliza Robertson

- First US edition
- Author: Eliza Robertson
- Language: English
- Publication date: 2014

Wallflowers is a collection of short stories by Eliza Robertson, published in 2014 by Bloomsbury. It has been nominated for The Story Prize and Danuta Gleed Literary Award.

In The New York Times, Natalie Serber wrote of the collection that it "asks big questions, not only how we survive loss and achieve intimacy, but whether we are strong enough, like the flowers on the wallpaper, to stand straight and sing our sorrows to the world." The Vancouver Sun described the collection as "a stunning debut".
