= Night Zero =

American webcomic

- Cover of Night Zero, Episode One, titled "Ashes"
- Author(s): Anthony van Winkle; Forest Gibson; Alexander JL Theoharis; Eli Black-Mizuta
- Website: http://www.nightzero.com/
- Current status/schedule: Ended
- Launch date: 2008-09-08

Night Zero is a webcomic and published graphic novel created by Anthony van Winkle and Forest Gibson. Conception and production began in late 2007, with the completion of the "pilot" episode in May 2008. The first serial comic began its online run on September 8, 2008.

== Story ==
The Daily of the University of Washington described Night Zero as "the day when every horror movie cliché comes to life in a splatter of blood: the apocalypse." It is set in a post-apocalyptic Seattle, where most people have become zombies called "scratchers". Other than weapons, people in the world are able to protect against the zombies’ scratches and bites by drinking, though alcohol is controlled by the mob. van Winkle said that this plot point provided a method to keep characters alive.

Seattle was among the first American cities to fall victim to the unknown – the infected attacked without mercy, remorse, or fatigue. Hospitals were overflowing with the sick and the sick only got worse as night fell. Quarantines were established, emergency protocols were enacted, but it was too little too late. The city fell into turmoil, bodies littered the streets, and the casualties began to rise. Key sectors of the city infrastructure and government were plunged into anarchy. The "scratchers," named for the tell-tale self-mutilation they perform on their bodies and faces, made the streets sticky with shed blood.

The power void left by a failing city government was the ideal ground for the Nazarov family, a Russian group that had less-than-legitimate activities before the collapse. Their organization had the muscle, capability, and network to assume control of Seattle, cordoning off a chunk of downtown as a safety zone. Those who could adhered to their rule for the chance at a new life, and their numbers grew. Those who chose to blaze their own trail saw their numbers dwindle.

Today, the New City is a walled-off community with just a fraction of the population of the old Seattle. The apparent security of the wall has allowed the New City's residents to pick up the pieces of their lives, and the outlook is optimistic in the face of uncertainty.

== Production ==
Night Zero is a photographic comic book. It was conceived of by Anthony van Winkle and co-created by Forest Gibson and van Winkle as a "neo-noir-style graphic novel with photography". Van Winkle said, “I tried to make a comic book a few years ago – but I found that I was wholly unable to draw... But that's when Mr. Gibson and I started combining different ideas.” The comic was first conceived in 2007.

According to the comic's website, Night Zero was shot in 82 days on location over the course of five years, and involved nearly a hundred crew members and almost four hundred casts and extras. The cast was composed of local improvisers and drama students, who received consulting by a professional model.

The comic was shot using HDR photography instead of standard single-exposures, which the creators chose to create a flat, hyper-realized look of a comic book. This required three separate exposures for each image. According to Gibson, this requirement was difficult for action shots. According to the creators, Night Zero does not use green-screens or CGI.

In an interview before the completion of the first book, Gibson said that "we’ve been learning more with every picture we take. Every one looks better than the last. Even shooting at 8 a.m. in the rain and cold — though difficult — turned out to be fun."

== Distribution and promotion ==
The comic was published three times a week online.

At least two printed books were produced: Night Zero: Volume One, released in February 2009 and Night Zero: Volume Two, released in March 2010. According to the comic's website, five printed volumes have been produced.

In March 2009, an apocalypse-themed party was held to celebrate the release of Volume One. Characters and activities from the Night Zero world entertained partygoers with an immersive environment. In March 2010, the second release party was also a themed/costume party, where party attendees were given unexplained map pieces and were tasked to collectively solve puzzles to unlock activities and enter a raffle for prizes.

== Reception ==
The book editor for Seattle's The Stranger described Volume One as "good zombie fun. The dialogue is painfully bad and the plot moves a little too slowly, but the photographs make everything a little extra creepy." A blog for the Seattle Post-Intelligencer called Night Zero "a very slick cinematic comic. It is a nifty fusion of theater comics and photography." In an article on photocomics, Flavorwire described Night Zero as "groundbreaking" and "amazing in its scope", saying "sometimes it really feels like you're looking at screenshots from a movie!"

== Related work ==
The team behind Night Zero also produced a live-action guest strip for the webcomic Geist Panik and a "fan art" gallery of characters from the Valve video game Left 4 Dead. The latter included a fifth character (a pirate), and the creators of Night Zero said that Valve had told them a pirate character would be added to a sequel of the game, but this was not true.
