= Alien Loves Predator =

2000s webcomic

- Author: Bernie Hou
- Website: http://www.alienlovespredator.com/
- Current status/schedule: Currently halted
- Launch date: 2004 (archive)
- Genre(s): Comedy, New York City

Alien Loves Predator (sometimes shortened as ALP) is a webcomic written by Bernie Hou. It spoofs the Alien vs. Predator franchise. Reversing the adversarial relationship depicted in the comics, games, books and movies, ALP presents an Alien (named Abe) and a Predator (named Preston) as friends and roommates in modern-day New York City.

The first issue of ALP was released in 2004. On August 28, 2008, the author of the strip announced that Alien Loves Predator would be updated sporadically, abandoning its regular weekly format. After a short run of a different webcomic, If You See Something, Bernie Hou announced that he would once again be running the strip and updating it weekly. It stopped updating in June 2011 and as of June 2024 appears to be offline.

== Style ==
The artwork of ALP is composed by juxtaposing photos of real-life action figures into backgrounds also primarily generated from photos. This style has alternately been called photocollage, photocomics or fumetti. A reviewer has stated that ALP "sets the bar for this art style."

ALP's humor is often based on absurdism and non-sequiturs. Abe and Preston speak English and treat each other just as human friends do, and the specific mythology of the Alien and Predator franchises is not a primary focus. Although the New York City of the strip seems virtually identical to the one we know in real life, the humans we see are generally unconcerned by the fact that an Alien and a Predator are living among them. (An alternate universe storyline that began in July 2009 has challenged this notion.)

Along with the surrealist humor of seeing alien races act just like humans, the strip simultaneously presents an observational brand of humor. Abe and Preston often are depicted going through the same frustrations that real-life modern-day New Yorkers encounter as they try to do such things as rent apartments, eat out at restaurants, and ride the subway. Transformers screenwriter John Rogers has compared ALP to Seinfeld in this respect.

== Recognition ==
ALP was a finalist for a Web Cartoonists' Choice Award for outstanding photographic comic in 2008.

Bernie Hou has been a featured guest at the MoCCA, ICON and UberCon comic conventions and has been interviewed by Wizard magazine. ALP received favorable mention in the March/April 2005 issue of Creative Screenwriting magazine, the February 2006 issue of Stuff magazine, and the April 2010 issue of Comics Buyer's Guide magazine.
