= Reg Balch =

Canadian photographer and scientist

Reginald Ernest Balch (29 December 1894 – 1994) was a Canadian photographer and scientist.

== Biography ==
He was born in Sevenoaks, England, the son of the Rev. Alfred Ernest Balch and Sarah Hawkes. He was educated at Bedford School and Kingswood School. Balch received a university scholarship but waived it to be a farmer. In 1913 he left home in England to become a cowboy in Canada.

He arrived in Canada in 1913, departing from Liverpool and disembarking ten days later at Saint John. He took a train to Ontario but found little work there. In 1914, he was hired by the Ontario Reformatory and later, with the outbreak of World War I, enlisted, serving three years in France with the Canadian Field Artillery.

After World War I, his interest in forest biology led him to enroll in the Ontario Agricultural College. He graduated in 1923 with a BSA degree. Afterwards, he took a summer job as a fire ranger and assisted an American forest entomologist. This led to his receiving an MS degree at Syracuse University's New York State College of Forestry in 1928.

In 1930 he was appointed Officer-in-Charge of the Dominion Entomological Laboratory, a federal government facility on the University of New Brunswick campus in Fredericton, New Brunswick. He settled in Fredericton with his wife, Martha.

His five half-hour radio lectures for the Canadian Broadcasting Corporation's University of the Air series in the spring of 1965 were essential in introducing the word "ecology" to the public. He later served as the honorary president for the Conservation Council of New Brunswick, one of the first modern Canadian environmental groups (established in 1969).

He travelled and photographed in Europe, especially Ireland. His photos illustrated a book of Alden Nowlan's poems, Early Poems.

== Bibliography ==
- Control of Forest Insects - R E Balch, Annual Review of Entomology, January 1958, Vol. 3, Pages 449–468, doi:10.1146/annurev.en.03.010158.002313
- The spruce budworm in New Brunswick - R. E. Balch, (Ottawa : Science Service, Forest Biology Division, Canada Department of Agriculture, 1958) Publication (Canada. Dept. of Agriculture); 1035
- Dieback of Birch in Canada - R. E. Balch, unpublished typescript, British Columbia Ministry of Forests Library, call number 634.90971 U-319
- The Ecological Viewpoint - R.E. Balch (Toronto: Canadian Broadcasting Corporation, 1965) ISBN 0-88794-023-4
- A Mind's Eye - R. E. Balch (Fredericton: Goose Lane Editions, 1985) ISBN 0-86492-066-0
- Celebrations of Nature - edited by Harold Hatheway (Fredericton: Goose Lane Editions, 1991) ISBN 0-86492-107-1

== Sources ==
- https://web.archive.org/web/20060514234152/http://www.lib.unb.ca/archives/balch.html
- Introduction to A Mind's Eye by Astrid Brunner
