= Stephen Guppy =

Canadian writer (born 1951)

Stephen Guppy (born February 10, 1951, in Nanaimo, British Columbia) is a Canadian writer. He is most noted for his short story "Downwind", which was a shortlisted finalist for the Journey Prize in 1998, and his poetry collection Understanding Heaven, which was shortlisted for the Dorothy Livesay Poetry Prize in 2002.

A graduate of the University of Victoria, he was a longtime professor of creative writing and journalism at Vancouver Island University until his retirement.

== Works ==
=== Poetry ===
- Ghostcatcher (1979)
- Blind Date with the Angel: The Diane Arbus Poems (1998)
- Understanding Heaven (2001)

=== Short story collections ===
- Another Sad Day at the Edge of the Empire (1985)
- The Work of Mercy (2006)

=== Novels ===
- The Fire Thief (2004)
- Like I Care (2013)

=== Non-fiction ===
- Writing and Workshopping Poetry: A Constructive Introduction (2016)
