= Rick Maddocks =

Canadian author and singer/songwriter (born 1970)

- Born: 1970 (age 55–56); Wales
- Origin: Canada
- Genres: Jazz; pop
- Occupations: Author, singer-songwriter

Rick Maddocks (born 1970) is a Canadian author and singer/songwriter. Born in Wales, he moved to Canada with his family in the early 1980s.

His short story collection Sputnik Diner (Random House, 2002) was nominated for the Danuta Gleed Literary Award. Its first story, "Plane People", won Prairie Fire's Long Fiction Competition as well as a Western Magazine Award, and "Lessons from the Sputnik Diner" was a shortlisted finalist for the Journey Prize. He was the editor of the literary magazine Event, published by Douglas College, from 2006 to September 2010.

Maddocks is the leader of Vancouver jazz/pop quintet The Beige. The band have released two albums, 01 (2006) and El Ángel Exterminador (2010).
