= Tamas Dobozy =

Canadian writer

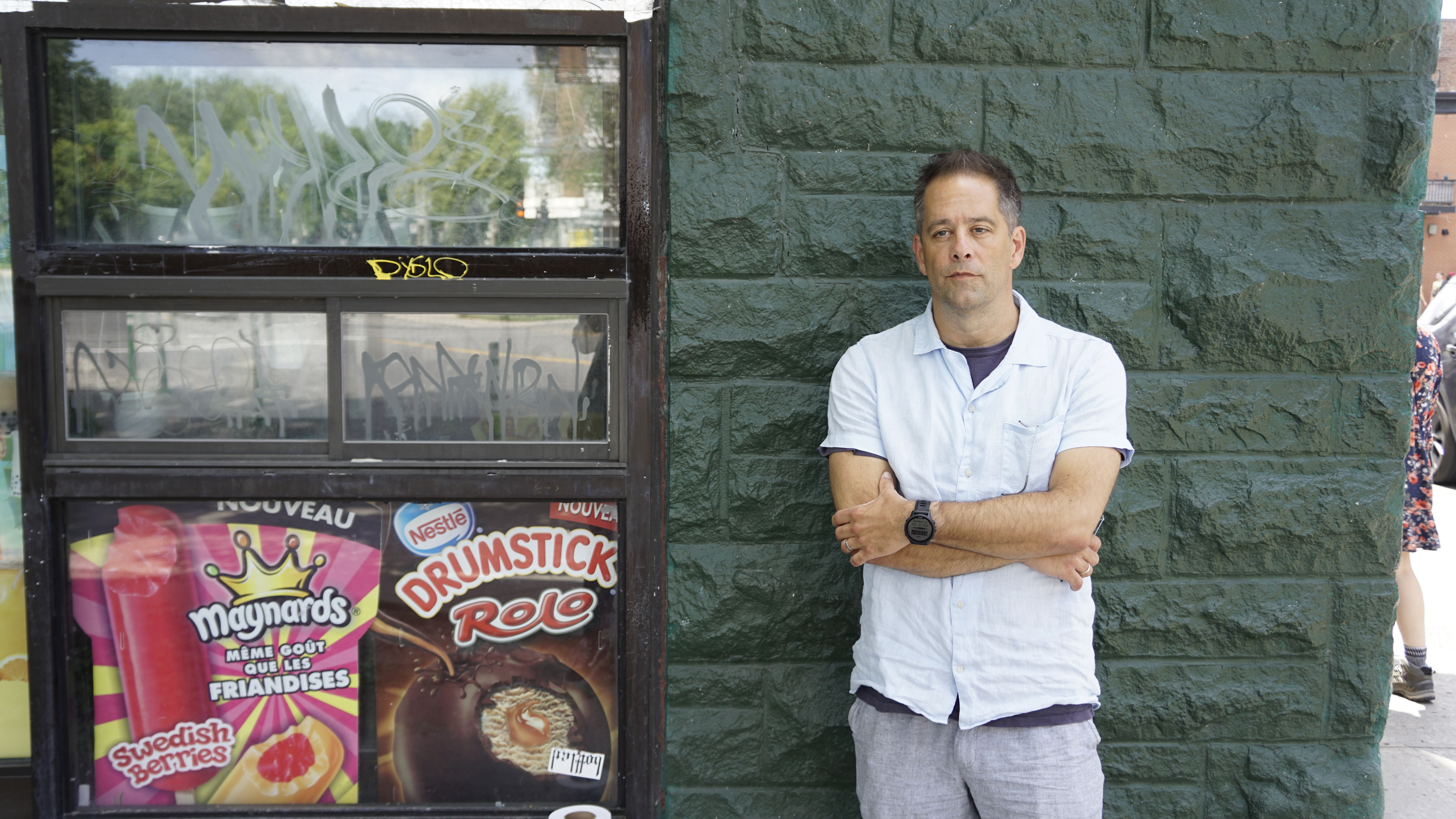
- Born: Nanaimo, British Columbia
- Occupations: Writer; teacher

Tamas Dobozy is a Canadian writer and professor at Wilfrid Laurier University.

== Early life ==
Dobozy was born in the city of Nanaimo, British Columbia, Canada, on August 26, 1969. Between the ages of 3 and 18 he lived in Powell River, British Columbia, and subsequently in Victoria, Montreal, Budapest, Vancouver, Toronto, St. John's, and Kitchener, Ontario.

He received his BA/BFA in English/Creative Writing from The University of Victoria, his MA in English from Concordia University, and his Ph.D. in English from the University of British Columbia.

== Career ==
Dobozy taught at Memorial University and currently teaches in the Department of English and Film Studies at Wilfrid Laurier University in Ontario.

== Awards and honours ==
- 1995 sub-Terrain Short Fiction Contest Winner for "Like A Salmon Getting Me Down"
- 2003 Danuta Gleed Literary Award shortlist for When X Equals Marylou
- 2011 O Henry Award for "The Restoration of the Villa Where Tíbor Kálmán Once Lived"
- 2012 Camera Obscura Editors' Award for Outstanding Fiction for "The Selected Mugshots of Famous Hungarian Assassins"
- 2012 Governor General's Awards shortlist for Siege 13
- 2012 Rogers Writers' Trust Fiction Prize winner for Siege 13
- 2013 Frank O'Connor International Short Story Award shortlist for Siege 13
- 2015 National Magazine Awards, Gold Medal for Fiction for "Krasnagorsk-2" published in The New Quarterly
- 2025 National Magazine Awards, Gold Medal for Fiction for "Tea with Interpol" published in Fiddlehead

== Bibliography ==
- When X Equals Marylou (Arsenal Pulp, 2002)
- Last Notes and Other Stories (HarperCollins Canada/Arcade, 2005)
- Siege 13: Stories (Thomas Allen/Milkweed, 2012)
- 5 Mishaps (School Gallery, 2021)
- Ghost Geographies: Fictions (New Star Books, 2021)
- Stasio: A Novel in Three Parts (Anvil Press, 2024)
