= Jacqueline Baker =

Canadian writer

- Born: Saskatchewan
- Occupation: novelist
- Writing career
- Period: 2000s–present
- Notable works: A Hard Witching, The Horseman's Graves, The Broken Hours

Jacqueline Baker is a Canadian writer. Originally from the Sand Hills region of southwestern Saskatchewan, she studied creative writing at the University of Victoria and the University of Alberta.

Her debut short story collection, A Hard Witching, was published in 2003. It was shortlisted for that year's Writers' Trust Fiction Prize, and won the Danuta Gleed Literary Award and the Alberta Book Award for short fiction.

Her first novel, The Horseman's Graves, was published in 2007. Her most recent novel is The Broken Hours, a ghost story about the final days of H. P. Lovecraft's life, in 2014.

She teaches creative writing at MacEwan University in Edmonton, Alberta.
