= Transparent Life =

Fumetti or photo-comic

Transparent Life logo

Transparent Life is a photo comic scripted, designed, and shot by Charlie Beck. Transparent Life began in May 2004 as a series of independent comics (through Milwaukee-based CHIMP Comics) with a website. The series folded after months of poor sales and feedback.

In August 2005, Transparent Life relaunched with Undertoad Comics, an artistic conglomerate led by Beck himself. The series published five monthly issues before moving entirely to the web at UndertoadComics.com. December 2005 marked the release of The Collected Transparent Life Volume 1, a compendium of the first five issues and previously unreleased material. The book experienced moderate sales.

Beck continued to produce new Transparent Life material throughout 2006 and the first half of 2007 (as well as other unrelated work), posting new items to the website once a week. However, updates ceased almost entirely during late 2007 and all of 2008.

The site was relaunched with regular updates in March 2009. Beck's next book collection, The Collected Transparent Life Volume 2 was also released in March, after being delayed for over two years. In June, Beck's first full-length graphic novel, Transparent Life: 1000 Miles, began serialization on the website, finally completed in late September 2010. The website resumed normal weekly updates of shorter material in November of the same year.
