= Kaie Kellough =

Canadian poet and novelist

Kaie Kellough (born 1975) is a Canadian poet and novelist. He was born in Vancouver, British Columbia, raised in Calgary, Alberta, and in 1998 moved to Montreal, Quebec, where he lives.

== Writing ==
Kellough has published three books of poetry, two audio recordings, one novel, and one collection of short stories. He is also a practitioner of vocal sound poetry. His work multiplies and layers voice, while exploring the fundamentals of language-production.

His experimental debut novel, Accordéon, takes the form of a transcript of someone being interrogated by three agents from a Ministry of Culture, and was a shortlisted nominee for the Amazon.ca First Novel Award. The novel was inspired by the conflict over the proposed Quebec Charter of Values. Writing for the Montreal Review of Books, Sara Spike calls it "a remarkable work of experimental fiction that pushes back against those who would forward a singular narrative of this unabashedly contradictory city, celebrating instead the messy multiplicity of Montreal."

Having mostly abandoned written poems in favor of sound work, Kellough only began to draw together the poems that would become Magnetic Equator after an encounter with Dionne Brand at a literary festival in 2017.

== Bibliography ==
=== Poetry ===
- —— (2005). Lettricity. Cumulus Press.
- —— (2010). Maple Leaf Rag. Arbeiter Ring Publishing.
- —— (2019). Magnetic Equator. McClelland and Stewart.

=== Audio ===
- —— (2011). Vox:Versus. WOW.
- —— (2014). Creole Continuum. HOWL.

=== Fiction ===
- —— (2016). Accordéon. ARP Books.
- —— (2020). Dominoes at the Crossroads. Véhicule Press.

== Awards ==
Kellough's poetry collection Magnetic Equator (2019) was shortlisted for the QWF A.M. Klein Award for Poetry that same year, and won the 2020 Griffin Poetry Prize. His short story collection Dominoes at the Crossroads (2020) was longlisted for the Giller Prize in 2020 and the ReLit Award for short fiction in 2021, and won the Paragraphe Hugh MacLennan Prize for Fiction at the 2020 Quebec Writers' Federation Awards. The book was a shortlisted finalist for the Danuta Gleed Literary Award in 2021.

He is the first person to be nominated for the Griffin Poetry Prize and the Scotiabank Giller Prize in the same year.

Year	Title	Award	Category	Result	Ref
2011?	Maple Leaf Rag	Manitoba Book Awards	Manuela Dias Design Award	Shortlisted	
2017	Accordéon	Amazon.ca First Novel Award	—	Shortlisted	
2019	Magnetic Equator	QWF A.M. Klein Award for Poetry	—	Shortlisted	
2020	Magnetic Equator	Griffin Poetry Prize	Canada	Won	
2020	Dominoes at the Crossroads	Giller Prize	—	Longlisted	
2020	Dominoes at the Crossroads	Quebec Writers' Federation Awards	Paragraphe Hugh MacLennan Prize for Fiction	Won	
2021	Dominoes at the Crossroads	Danuta Gleed Literary Award	—	Shortlisted	
2021	Dominoes at the Crossroads	ReLit Award	Short Fiction	Longlisted	
