= André Narbonne =

Canadian writer

André Narbonne is a Canadian writer, whose novel Lucien & Olivia was longlisted for the 2022 Giller Prize.

Originally a marine engineer, Narbonne settled in Halifax, Nova Scotia, in the mid-1980s, and studied English literature at Dalhousie University. He is a former chair of the Halifax chapter of the Canadian Poetry Association, and was the winner of the Writers' Federation of New Brunswick's David Adams Richards Award in 2008 for his short story collection "The Separatists". He later pursued his Ph.D. at the University of Western Ontario, and is currently a professor of English at the University of Windsor, specializing in Canadian Literature.

His short story collection Twelve Miles to Midnight, was published in 2016, and was shortlisted for the Danuta Gleed Literary Award in 2017. In 2017, he published the poetry collection You Were Here. Lucien & Olivia, his debut novel, was published by Black Moss Press in 2022.

In 2025, he founded Conspiracy Press.

== Works ==
- Twelve Miles to Midnight - 2016
- You Were Here - 2017
- Lucien & Olivia - 2022
