= The Broken Record Technique =

2002 short story collection by Lee Henderson

- First edition cover
- Author: Lee Henderson
- Publisher: Penguin Canada
- Publication date: April 2002
- ISBN: 0-14-100568-8

The Broken Record Technique is a collection of short stories by Canadian author Lee Henderson. It was first published by Penguin Canada in 2002, and contains ten short stories. The tenth story, entitled simply "W", is considerably longer than the rest, standing at one hundred pages. The average for the other stories is a little over ten pages each. This was Lee Henderson's first book, and contained some previously published short stories, one of which, "Sheep Dub" was part of the 2000 Journey Prize Anthology.

The short stories within the book are not connected, but recognizably follow the same quirkiness that gives the collection its charm. The opening story "Attempts at a Great Relationship" describes a young man who lives through five possible scenarios at the new wave-pool with his wife, searching for the one that would save his marriage. "The Unfortunate" tells the heart-breaking story a boy born with a football-shaped head. In "The Runner after John Cheever" a man takes an unusual marathon in memory of his dead lover.

The book takes its odd name from a work by Edmund J. Bourne titled "The Anxiety & Phobia Workbook". In this work, the "broken record" technique is a form of calm persistent repetition that allows the user to eventually achieve what they want. The author specifically warns against the use of this technique in close relationships.

== Contents ==
- Attempts at a Great Relationship
- Mirage/Fata Morgana
- Spines a Length of Velcro
- Shaved Temple
- Sheep Dub
- Any Number of Reasons to Act as One Does, Under the Circumstances
- The Runner after John Cheever
- The Unfortunate
- Highlights From the Young Boy vs The Ram
