= Liz Harmer =

Canadian writer

Liz Harmer is a Canadian writer, whose debut novel The Amateurs was shortlisted for the Amazon.ca First Novel Award in 2019. The novel, written as her master's thesis while studying creative writing at the University of Toronto, was published by Knopf Canada in 2018. She currently teaches at The Webb Schools.

Originally from Hamilton, Ontario, she is currently based in California.

She was also a shortlisted Journey Prize finalist in 2018 for her short story "Never Prosper".

== Publications ==
- Harmer, Liz (2018). ''The Amateurs''. Toronto: Knopf Canada. ISBN 978-0345811240
- Harmer, Liz (2023). ''Strange Loops''. Toronto: Knopf Canada. ISBN 978-0345811288
