= Photo comics =

Comic style

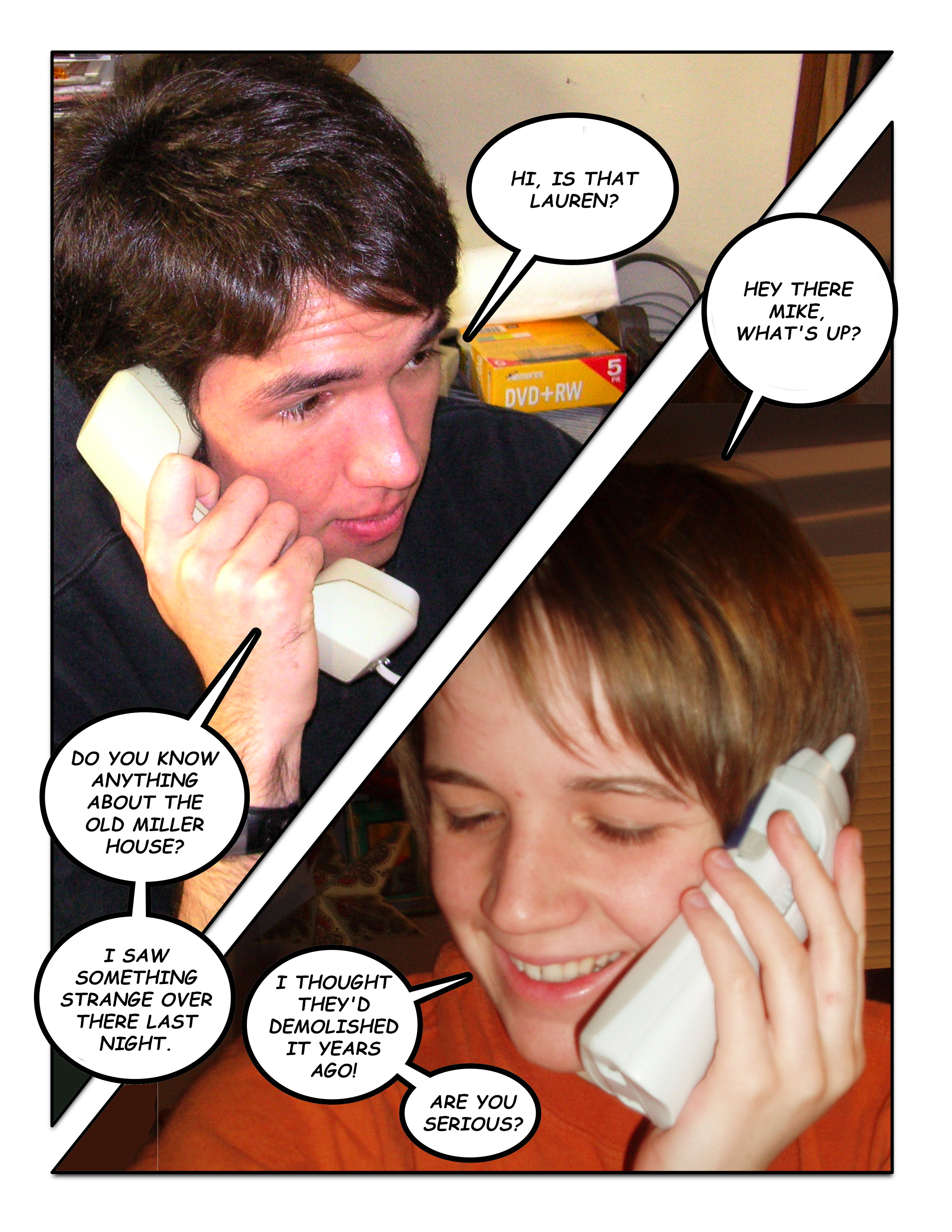
Example of a two-panel photo comic page

Photo comics (also known as fumetti, photonovels or photoromances) are a form of sequential storytelling using photographs rather than illustrations for the images, along with the usual comics conventions of narrative text and word balloons containing dialogue. The photographs may be of real people in staged scenes, or posed dolls and other toys on sets.

Although far less common than illustrated comics, photo comics have filled certain niches in various places and times. For example, they have been used to adapt popular film and television works into print, tell original melodramas, and provide medical education. Photo comics have been popular at times in Italy and Latin America, and to a lesser extent in English-speaking countries.

== Terminology ==
The terminology used to describe photo comics is somewhat inconsistent and idiosyncratic. Fumetti is an Italian word (literally "little puffs of smoke", in reference to word balloons), which refers in that language to any kind of comics. Because of the popularity of photo comics in Italy, fumetti became a loanword in English referring specifically to that technique. By extension, comics which use a mixture of photographic and illustrated imagery have been described as mezzo-fumetti ("half" fumetti). Meanwhile, the Spanish term fotonovela – referring to popular photo-comics melodramas in Latin America – was adapted in English as fotonovel or photonovel, and came to be associated primarily with film and television adaptations, which were marketed using those terms. Variations such as "photo funnies" and "photostories" have also been used.

In Italian, a photo comic is referred to as a fotoromanzo ("photonovel", plural: fotoromanzi). In Spanish-speaking countries, the term fotonovela refers to several genres of photo comics, including original melodramas.

== History ==
There were attempts at photo comics in the early days of tabloids in the United States. The New York Graphic (1924–1932) featured a daily multi-panel "Graphic Photo Drama from Life" illustrated feature and an "Antics of Arabella" comic strip in which scantily clad chorus girls or models demonstrated Physical Culture exercise poses while telling jokes in word balloons. As early as 1927, the New York Daily News featured Ziegfeld Follies stars Eddie Cantor and Frances Upton appearing in sequential photographs, telling jokes (presumably from the Follies scripts) with speech bubbles superimposed.

Cover of an issue of Killing, an Italian photo comic series published since the 1960s

Photo comics emerged in Italy in the 1940s and expanded into the 1950s. (Actress Sophia Loren worked for a time as a model.) The lurid Italian crime photo comic Killing ran from 1966 through 1969, and was reprinted in other countries; it has been reprinted and revived numerous times since then.

The technique spread to Latin America, first adapting popular films, then for original stories. By the 1960s, there were about two dozen fotonovela movie adaptations circulating in Latin America and nearly three times as many original works. They remained popular in Mexico into the late 1980s, when 70 million copies of fotonovelas were printed each month.

Photo comics first became successful in the United States and Canada with Harvey Kurtzman's Help! magazine, which ran humorous photo stories from 1960 to 1965. Similar "Foto Funnies" – often featuring female nudity – were a regular feature of National Lampoon magazine beginning in the early 1970s.

During the 1970s, lines of American paperback books were marketed as "Fotonovels" and "Photostories", adapting popular films and television shows. Although home video largely supplanted this market in the 1980s, a small number of photo comic adaptations continued to be produced as promotional tie-ins to the original work.

Photo comics were common in British magazines such as Jackie in the 1980s, and a few are still published. There are a number of photo newspaper strips in the UK and the form was popular in girl's comics in the 1980s. Boy's comics of the early 1980s such as Load Runner and the relaunched Eagle also experimented with photo comics but without much success; when the Eagle was revamped, former photo comic strips such as Doomlord continued as illustrated strips.

Online series such as Night Zero, A Softer World, and Alien Loves Predator are more recent examples of photo comics. In 2007, the Web Cartoonists' Choice Awards gave the first award for "Outstanding Photographic Comic". In 2010 and 2011, the bilingual photo comic Union of Heroes was nominated for the "Web-Sonderman"-Awards for the best German webcomic. In the 2010s, cartoonist John Byrne – inspired by 1970s photo comics adaptations of Star Trek episodes – produced a series of "photonovel adventures" which combined stills from the series with original digitally rendered background illustrations and new dialogue, to produce new stories featuring the characters.

Software applications such as Comic Life, Comic Strip It, and Strip Designer, which allow users to add word balloons and sound effects to their personal photos and incorporate them into storytelling layouts, have revived some interest in the medium.

== Common genres ==
=== TV and movie adaptations ===
In the United States, one of the common uses of photo comics has been TV and film adaptations, usually abridged for length. Still frames from the film or video are reproduced, often in simple grids but sometimes with creative layouts and cropping, overlaid with balloons with abbreviated dialogue from the screenplays. They are a cost-effective way to adapt films and TV series into comics without the expense of commissioning illustrations, and were a way for consumers to revisit motion-picture stories before the widespread availability of affordable home recording and video playback equipment such as VCRs.

=== Educational ===
The widespread familiarity of fotonovelas in Spanish-language culture makes photo comics an effective vehicle for health promotion and health education. Since the small pamphlets can be traded among individuals, they possess an element of portability that traditional materials lack. Both health and non-health entities have utilized the fotonovela as informational pamphlets. The fotonovelas produced by these organizations present information in a variety of illustrated forms but usually contain a summation of key points at the end. Health educators have also utilized the fotonovela because the medium overcomes issues of health literacy, which is the degree to which individuals can obtain, process and understand basic health information to make appropriate health decisions, in their target audience. Most providers believe that health education materials designed specifically for patients with low health literacy would be helpful: however, written educational materials found in most health settings have been deemed to have serious deficiencies.

== Notable examples ==
=== Original photo comics ===
- Twisted ToyFare Theatre, the inspiration behind Robot Chicken
- The Brick Bible, stories from the Bible illustrated using photos of Lego figurines and sets, as well as speech balloons and caption boxes
- Killing
- A Softer World by Joey Comeau and Emily Horne.
- Doomlord by Alan Grant and John Wagner.
- Alien Loves Predator by Bernie Hou.
- Transparent Life by Charlie Beck
- Night Zero by Anthony van Winkle and Eli Black-Mizuta.
- The Chefs of Death mini-series written by Alex Finch and starring Ian Lane, Chloe Taylor and Christopher Denton.
- The series 3hoog, Ype and De Uitgeverij by Dutch comics artist Ype Driessen.
- The one-shot album De Hete Urbanus (The Hot Urbanus) in the Urbanus series by Willy Linthout and Urbanus.
- Urbanus, Kamagurka and Herr Seele made some one-shot photo comics in the 1980s for the magazine Humo.
- Louis Salvérius and Raoul Cauvin once made a one-shot photo comic strip parodying their own series Les Tuniques Bleues with themselves dressed up as their characters.
- Mannetje en Mannetje (Little Man and Little Man) by Hanco Kolk and Peter de Wit.
- Christopher's Punctured Romance by Terry Gilliam, starring John Cleese.
- Jean Teulé is a French cartoonist who takes photographs or makes photocopies, which he then changes with colors and pencil.
- @$$hole by Trevor Mueller
- Kwakzalver en Knettergek by Nix.
- God en Klein Pierken by Nix and Bart Schoofs.
- The work of Dutch Internet artist Kakhiel.
- Crimefighters by Fjodor Buis and Thé Tjong-Khing.
- Happenstance by Stephen Saperstein Frug, which used color photographs, sometimes intentionally blurred, to tell the story of a character with prosopagnosia (the inability to recognize faces).
- Artful Design: Technology in Search of the Sublime, a book by Ge Wang.
- Punk magazine by John Holmstrom et al. frequently used the photo comics format for interviews and other features, notably in the case of two full-length photo comics "The Legend of Nick Detroit" (#6, October 1976), and "Mutant Monster Beach Party" (#15, July/August 1978).
- The Last Gay Man on Earth, an autobio graphic novel by Ype Driessen.

=== Film adaptations ===
(Many marketed as "Fotonovels")

- Alien (1979 film) (large format)
- Americathon (1979)
- The Best of Rocky and the Complete Rocky II (1979)
- Blair Witch Project, The (2000)
- Buck Rogers in the 25th Century (1979)
- Can't Stop the Music (1980)
- The Champ (1979)
- Charlie's Angels (2000)
- Cheech and Chong's Next Movie (1980)
- Close Encounters of the Third Kind (1977)
- Grease (1978)
- Hair (1979)
- Heaven Can Wait (1978)
- Ice Castles (1978)
- Invasion of the Body Snatchers (1978)
- The Jerk (1979)
- Little Shop of Horrors (1986), adapted by Robert and Louise Egan
- The Lord of the Rings (1978)
- Love at First Bite (1979)
- Nashville (1975)
- Nightwing (1979)
- Outland (1981) (large format)
- Revenge of the Pink Panther (1979)
- The Rocky Horror Picture Show (1975)
- Saturday Night Fever (1977)
- Star Trek: The Motion Picture: The Photostory, edited by Richard J. Anobile (1980)
- Star Trek II: The Wrath of Khan: Photostory, by Richard J. Anobile (1982)

=== Television adaptations ===
(Many marketed as "Fotonovels")

- Battlestar Galactica (pilot film)
- Doctor Who
- The Incredible Hulk
- Mork & Mindy
- Star Blazers. English version of Space Battleship Yamato published by West Cape Corporation in 1983
- Star Trek – Twelve episodes were adapted.
  - The City on the Edge of Forever, published November 1977
  - Where No Man Has Gone Before, published November 1977
  - The Trouble with Tribbles, published December 1977
  - A Taste of Armageddon, published January 1978
  - Metamorphosis, published February 1978
  - All Our Yesterdays, published March 1978
  - The Galileo Seven, published May 1978
  - A Piece of the Action, published June 1978
  - The Devil in the Dark, published July 1978
  - Day of the Dove, published August 1978
  - The Deadly Years, published September 1978
  - Amok Time, published October 1978

== See also ==
- Photo-romance, an alternative term for photo comics, specifically associated with Theatre of the Oppressed
- Film comic
