= Five Wives =

2019 novel by Joan Thomas

- First edition
- Author: Joan Thomas
- Language: English
- Publisher: Harper Avenue
- Publication date: September 3, 2019
- Publication place: Canada
- Media type: Print (Hardcover, Paperback)
- Pages: 400
- ISBN: 978-1443458559
- Preceded by: The Opening Sky

Five Wives is a novel by Joan Thomas, published in 2019 by Harper Avenue. Based on the real-life Operation Auca, in which five Christian missionaries were murdered when they attempted to contact the isolated Huaorani people in Ecuador, the novel centres on the perspective of the men's wives.

Russell Smith of The Globe and Mail praised the novel, calling Thomas one of Canada's most underrated writers and ultimately concluding that the novel was comparable to the work of Alice Munro.

The novel won the Governor General's Award for English-language fiction at the 2019 Governor General's Awards.
