= Jack Wang =

Canadian writer

Jack Wang is a Canadian writer from Vancouver, British Columbia, who won the Danuta Gleed Literary Award in 2021 for his debut short story collection We Two Alone.

An associate professor of creative writing at Ithaca College in New York, he has also published several children's books jointly authored with his twin brother, Holman Wang.
