= Adam Lewis Schroeder =

Canadian novelist and short story writer

Adam Lewis Schroeder is a Canadian novelist and short story writer.

He has an MFA in creative Writing from the University of British Columbia. In 2001, Raincoast Books published his short fiction collection Kingdom of Monkeys, which was shortlisted for the Danuta Gleed Award, awarded annually to the best Canadian debut collection. His first novel, Empress of Asia was published in 2006 and was a finalist for the Amazon.ca/Books in Canada First Novel Award. His more recent novels include In the Fabled East (2010) and All-Day Breakfast (2015), both published by Douglas & McIntyre. In 2016, All-Day Breakfast was shortlisted for a ReLit Award.

Schroeder lives in Penticton with his wife Nicole and their sons Jimmy and Finn.

== Bibliography ==
=== Novels ===
- Empress of Asia (2006) Raincoast Books
- In the Fabled East (2010) Douglas & McIntyre
- All-Day Breakfast (2015) Douglas & McIntyre

=== Short story collections ===
- Kingdom of Monkeys (2001) Raincoast Books

=== Short stories ===
- "House on Fire", Grain, Winter 1997
- "The Country Squire", Zygote, Winter/Spring 1999
- "Scenes from a War" (in 04: Best Canadian Stories, edited by Douglas Glover, 2004, Oberon Press)
- "California", Grain, Summer 2004
- "Beware the Cockeyed Millionaire", Geist, Spring 2005
- "Halycon Memories of SweaterLodge", fifty3, Spring 2006
- "Something Tells Me I'm Into Something Good", PRISM International, Spring 2007
- "The Nootka Sound", Geist, Spring 2007
- "The Lost Colony", MEET #12, November 2008
- "This is not the End My Friend" (in Darwin's Bastards: Astounding Tales from Tomorrow, edited by Zsuzi Gartner, 2010, Douglas & McIntyre)
