= R. W. Gray =

Canadian writer, filmmaker and academic

- Born: Robert Gray; Prince Rupert, British Columbia
- Education: University of Victoria (B.A.); University of Manitoba (M.A.); University of Alberta (Ph.D.)
- Occupations: novelist, poet, short story writer, film critic, screenwriter
- Writing career
- Language: English
- Period: 2000s–present
- Notable works: Crisp, Entropic

Robert (R. W.) Gray is a Canadian writer, filmmaker, and academic.

Originally from Prince Rupert, British Columbia, he was educated at the University of Victoria, the University of Manitoba and the University of Alberta. He taught screenwriting at the Vancouver Film School in the early 2000s, and published two serialized novels, Tide Pool Sketches (2001) and Waterboys (2004), in Xtra! West during this era.

His debut short story collection Crisp was published in 2010, and was shortlisted for the Danuta Gleed Literary Award in 2011.

His second short story collection, Entropic, followed in 2015, winning him the Thomas Head Raddall Award. He has also published both poetry and short stories in Arc, Grain, Event, The Fiddlehead, Malahat Review, and dANDelion. His poems "How this begins", "Flutter", "Bite", and "Outside the Café" appeared in John Barton and Billeh Nickerson's 2007 anthology Seminal: The Anthology of Canada's Gay Male Poets.

As a screenwriter, he has written six short films, of which he directed two. He has also produced several short films for other directors.

He is currently based in Fredericton, New Brunswick, where he teaches in the film studies department at the University of New Brunswick and is an organizer of the annual Fredericton 48-Hour Film Competition. He is also a senior editor and film critic for the web magazine Numéro Cinq, and the head of the Pink Lobster Film Festival.

== Publications ==
- Tide Pool Sketches (2001)
- Waterboys (2004)
- Crisp (2010)
- Entropic (2015)

== Filmography ==
- Tableware (2007)
- Alice & Huck (2008)
- Blink (2014)
- Objects Are Closer (2012)
- The Wall (2013)
- Zack & Luc (2014)
