= Gillian Wigmore =

Canadian writer

Gillian Wigmore (born 1976) is a Canadian poet and fiction writer from Vanderhoof, British Columbia. Her poetry fits within the genre of ecopoetry.

== Biography ==
Wigmore graduated from the University of Victoria in 1999 with a double major in Writing and in English.

Wigmore published her first chapbook, home when it moves you in 2005, followed by her first book of poetry, Soft Geography in 2007. In 2014, her first fiction, Grayling (a novella), was published by Mother Tongue. The novella follows a couple as they descend the Dease River in northwestern BC. Her first full-length fictional work, Glory, was released in 2017. Some of her work is published in Geist and other publications.

She resides in Prince George, British Columbia.

== Awards and honours ==
Wigmore was a finalist for the 2008 Dorothy Livesay Poetry Prize and won the 2008 ReLit Poetry Award.

Her short story collection Night Watch: The Vet Suite was named a runner-up for the Danuta Gleed Literary Award in 2022.

== Works ==
- home When it moves you (2005)
- Soft Geography (2007)
- Glory (2017)
- Night Watch: The Vet Suite (2021)
