= Angélique Lalonde =

Canadian writer

Angélique Lalonde is a Canadian writer from Sparwood, British Columbia, whose debut collection Glorious Frazzled Beings was shortlisted for the 2021 Giller Prize.

She previously won the Journey Prize in 2019 for the short story "Pooka".

Lalonde the second eldest of 4 girls, who is of Québécois descent, received a Ph.D. in anthropology from the University of Victoria in 2013.

== Publications ==
- Glorious Frazzled Beings (2021)
- Variations on a Dream: A Novel (2026)
