= Matthew J. Trafford =

Canadian writer

- Occupation: novelist
- Writing career
- Period: 2000s-present
- Notable work: The Divinity Gene

Matthew J. Trafford is a Canadian writer, who was awarded an Honour of Distinction from the Dayne Ogilvie Prize for LGBT writers in 2011.

A graduate of the creative writing program at the University of British Columbia, he published his debut short story collection The Divinity Gene in 2011. He also won the Far Horizons Award for Short Fiction in 2007 for his short story "Past Perfect", and has had work nominated for both the National Magazine Awards and the CBC Literary Awards. His short stories have been anthologized in Darwin's Bastards and Best Gay Stories 2012.

He is based in Toronto, Ontario. He also occasionally performs in an improv comedy duo, The Bromos, with his brother Thomas, who was a panelist on the television series 1 Girl 5 Gays.

== Works ==
- The Divinity Gene (2011)
