= Reading by Lightning =

2008 novel by Joan Thomas

- First edition
- Author: Joan Thomas
- Language: English
- Publisher: Goose Lane Editions
- Publication date: 2008
- Publication place: Canada
- Media type: Print (Hardcover, Paperback)
- Pages: 340
- ISBN: 978-0-8649-2512-1
- Followed by: Curiosity

Reading by Lightning is the debut novel by Joan Thomas, published in 2008 by Goose Lane Editions. The novel's central character is Lily Piper, a young woman who was raised in a strict Christian fundamentalist upbringing on the Canadian Prairies, and then experienced much greater freedom for the first time in her life when she was sent to England to live with her grandmother as a teenager, but now must return home when her mother falls terminally ill.

The novel won the Amazon.ca First Novel Award in 2009. It was also the regional finalist for Canada and the Caribbean in the 2009 Commonwealth Writer's Prize shortlist, and was named to the initial longlist for the International Dublin Literary Award.
