= The Canvas Barricade =

The Canvas Barricade is a two-act play by Donald Jack. It won a Canadian play-writing competition held jointly by The Globe and Mail and the Stratford Festival, and had a six-performance run at the Stratford Festival in 1961. It was the first original Canadian play produced at Stratford. The cast for the Stratford production included Peter Donat (in the lead role of Misty Woodenbridge), Kate Reid, Zoe Caldwell, Eric Christmas and Bruno Gerussi.

The play was directed by George McCowan, with costumes by Mark Negin, choreography by Alan and Blanche Lund, and a score by Harry Freedman.
