= Devon Code =

Canadian writer

Devon Code is a Canadian writer, who won the Journey Prize in 2010 for his short story "Uncle Oscar".

Originally from Dartmouth, Nova Scotia, he has more recently been based in Peterborough, Ontario, where he has taught at Fleming College. He published his debut short fiction collection, In a Mist, in 2007, and followed up with his debut novel, Involuntary Bliss, in 2016. In 2021, Code, Emily Anglin, Jean Marc Ah-Sen and Lee Henderson published Disintegration in Four Parts, a volume collecting one novella by each of the four writers.
