= Journey Prize =

Canadian literary award

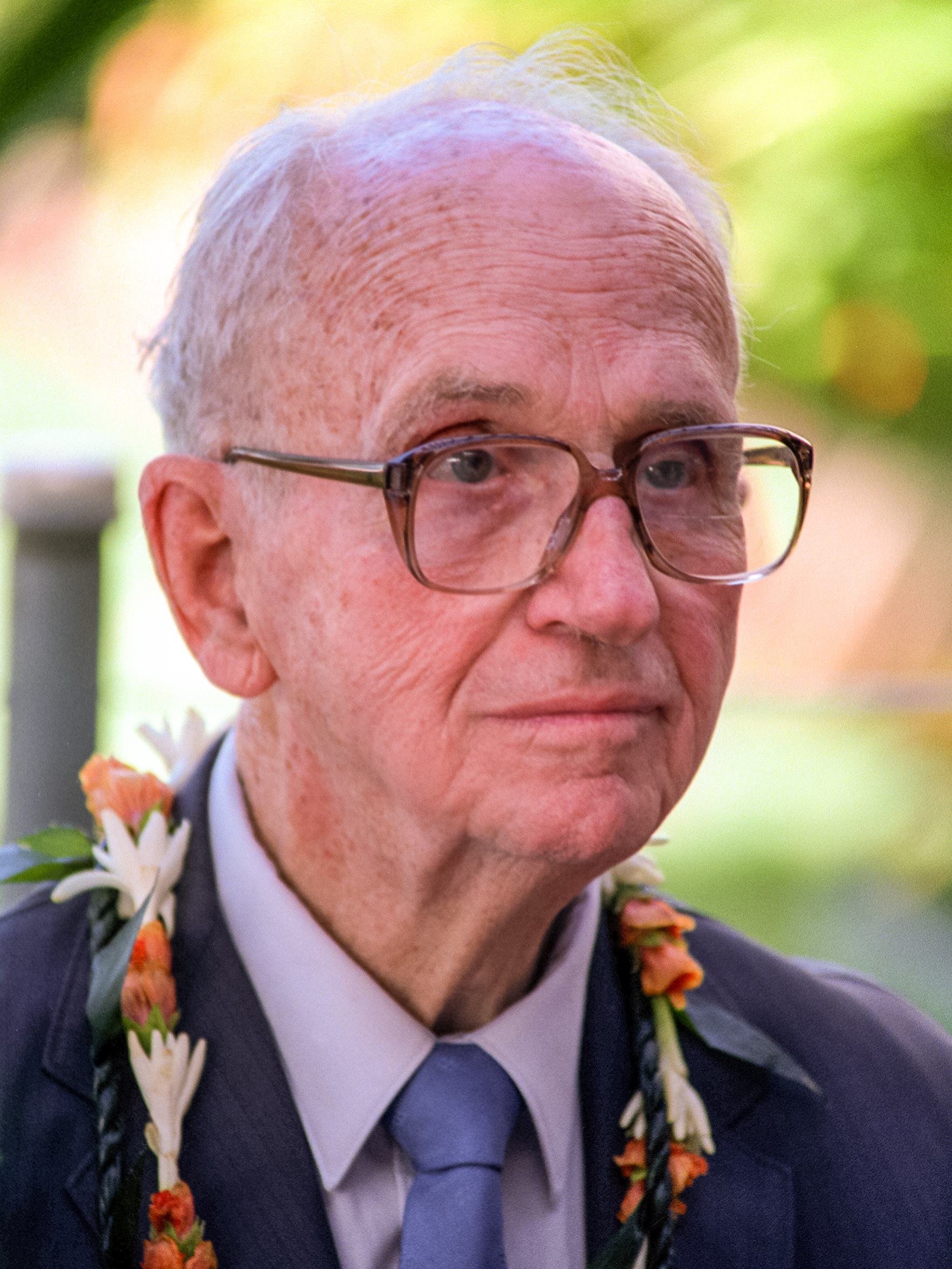
The award was endowed by James A. Michener, who donated the Canadian royalty earnings from his 1988 novel Journey after which the award is named

The Journey Prize (officially called The Writers' Trust of Canada McClelland & Stewart Journey Prize) is a Canadian literary award, presented annually by McClelland and Stewart and the Writers' Trust of Canada for the best short stories published by an emerging writer in a Canadian literary magazine. The award was endowed by James A. Michener, who donated the Canadian royalty earnings from his 1988 novel Journey.

From the award's inception until 2023, a single story was named the winner and the author received CA$10,000, making it the largest monetary award given in Canada to an up-and-coming writer for a short story or excerpt from a fiction work-in-progress. Since 2023, the award no longer select a single prize winners. Instead, all of the 10 writers whose stories are selected for inclusion in the anthology are considered equal winners of the award and each receives $1,000 in prize money.

The prize's winner in 2000, Timothy Taylor, was the first writer ever to have three stories nominated for the award in the same year.

The Journey Prize publishes an annual anthology of the year's longlisted short stories. Two writers, Andrew MacDonald and David Bergen, have both had a record four total stories selected for inclusion in the annual anthology.

In 2020, the Journey Prize committee announced that the upcoming award would be a special edition devoted exclusively to Black Canadian writers, and consider stories published in multiple years. Although the initial report was that the special Black Canadian edition of the award would be presented in 2021 for stories published in 2019, 2020 and 2021, the organizers instead paused the award for 2021 and 2022. They presented a special Black Canadian award in early 2023 to honour works published since 2020.

In 2024, the 25th anniversary of the awards was marked with a special retrospective anthology, edited by Alexander MacLeod and Souvankham Thammavongsa, compiling selected winning and nominated stories from throughout the history of the awards.

== Winners and nominees ==
=== 1980s ===
Year	Author	Title	Ref
1989	Holley Rubinsky	"Rapid Transits"	

=== 1990s ===
Year	Author	Title	Ref
1990	Cynthia Flood	"My Father Took a Cake to France"	
1991	Yann Martel	"The Facts Behind the Helsinki Roccamatios"	
1991	Diana Hartog	"Theories of Grief"	
1991	Diane Keating	"The Salem Letters"	
1992	Rozena Maart	"No Rosa, No District Six"	
1992	Steven Heighton	"How Beautiful Upon the Mountains"	
1992	Diane Juttner Perreault	"Bella's Story"	
1993	Gayla Reid	"Sister Doyle's Men"	
1993	Marina Endicott	"With the Band"	
1993	Carol Windley	"The Etruscans"	
1994	Melissa Hardy	"Long Man the River"	
1994	Anne Carson	"Water Margins"	
1994	Robert Mullen	"Anomie"	
1995	Kathryn Woodward	"Of Marranos and Gilded Angels"	
1995	Gabriella Goliger	"Song of Ascent"	
1995	Elizabeth Hay	"Hand Games"	
1996	Elyse Gasco	"Can You Wave Bye Bye, Baby?"	
1996	Danuta Gleed	"Bones"	
1996	Rick Maddocks	"Lessons from the Sputnik Diner"	
1997	Gabriella Goliger	"Maladies of the Inner Ear"	
1997	Anne Simpson	"Dreaming Snow"	
1997	Mark Anthony Jarman	"Speedboat"	
1998	John Brooke	"The Finer Points of Apples"	
1998	Ian Colford	"The Reason for the Dream"	
1998	Stephen Guppy	"Downwind"	
1999	Alissa York	"The Back of the Bear’s Mouth"	

=== 2000s ===
Year	Author	Title	Ref.
2000	Timothy Taylor	"Doves of Townsend"	
2001	Kevin Armstrong	"The Cane Field"	
2001	Vivette J. Kady	"Anything That Wiggles"	
2001	Heather O'Neill	"Little Suitcase"	
2002	Jocelyn Brown	"Miss Canada"	
2002	Geoffrey Brown	"Listen"	
2002	Neil Smith	"Green Fluorescent Protein"	
2003	Jessica Grant	"My Husband’s Jump"	
2003	Dawn Rae Downton	"Hansel and Gretel"	
2003	Charlotte Gill	"Hush"	
2004	Devin Krukoff	"The Last Spark"	
2004	Kenneth Bonert	"Packers and Movers"	
2004	Elaine McCluskey	"The Watermelon Social"	
2005	Matt Shaw	"Matchbook for a Mother's Hair"	
2005	Krista Bridge	"A Matter of Firsts"	
2005	Barbara Romanik	"Seven Ways to Chandigarh"	
2006	Heather Birrell	"BriannaSusannaAlana"	
2006	Lee Henderson	"Conjugation"	
2006	Martin West	"Cretacea"	
2007	Craig Boyko	"Ozy"	
2007	Krista Foss	"Swimming in Zanzibar"	
2007	Rebecca Rosenblum	"Chilly Girl"	
2008	Saleema Nawaz	"My Three Girls"	
2008	Dana Mills	"Steaming for Godthab"	
2008	Clea Young	"Chaperone"	
2009	Yasuko Thanh	"Floating Like the Dead"	
2009	Daniel Griffin	"The Last Great Works of Alvin Cale"	
2009	Dave Margoshes	"The Wisdom of Solomon"	

=== 2010s ===
Year	Author	Title	Ref.
2010	Devon Code	"Uncle Oscar"	
2010	Krista Foss	"The Longitude of Okay"	
2010	Lynne Kutsukake	"Mating"	
2011	Miranda Hill	"Petitions to Saint Chronic"	
2011	Seyward Goodhand	"The Fur Trader's Daughter"	
2011	Ross Klatte	"First-Calf Heifer"	
2012	Alex Pugsley	"Crisis on Earth-X"	
2012	Kevin Hardcastle	"To Have to Wait"	
2012	Andrew Hood	"Manning"	
2013	Naben Ruthnum	"Cinema Rex"	
2013	Doretta Lau	"How Does a Single Blade of Grass Thank the Sun?"	
2013	Eliza Robertson	"My Sister Sang"	
2014	Tyler Keevil	"Sealskin"	
2014	Lori McNulty	"Monsoon Season"	
2014	Clea Young	"Juvenile"	
2015	Deirdre Dore	"The Wise Baby"	
2015	Emily Bossé	"Last Animal Standing on Gentleman’s Farm"	
2015	Anna Ling Kaye	"Red Egg and Ginger"	
2016	Colette Langlois	"The Emigrants"	
2016	Charlie Fiset	"If I Ever See the Sun"	
2016	J. R. McConvey	"How the Grizzly Came to Hang in the Royal Oak Hotel"	
2017	Sharon Bala	"Butter Tea at Starbucks"	
2017	Darlene Naponse	"She Is Water"	
2018	Shashi Bhat	"Mute"	
2018	Greg Brown	"Love"	
2018	Liz Harmer	"Never Prosper"	
2019	Angélique Lalonde	"Pooka"	
2019	Kai Conradi	"Every True Artist"	
2019	Samantha Jude Macpherson	"The Fish and the Dragons"	

=== 2020s ===
Year	Author	Title	Ref.
2020	Jessica Johns	"Bad Cree"	
2020	Lisa Foad	"Hunting"	
2020	David Huebert	"Chemical Valley"	
2021	No award presented		
2022	No award presented		
2023	Christina Cooke		
2023	A. Z. Farah		
2023	Zilla Jones		
2023	Sarah Kabamba		
2023	Terese Mason Pierre		
2023	Téa Mutonji		
2023	Lue Palmer		
2023	Jasmine Sealy		
2023	Dianah Smith		
2023	Iryn Tushabe		
