= Danuta Gleed =

Canadian writer

Danuta Gleed (1946 – 11 December 1996) was a Kenyan-born Canadian writer.

== Biography ==
She was born in Kenya in a British camp for displaced persons where she spent her early childhood. In 1958, her family moved to England. At the time of her death, she was living in Ottawa, Ontario, Canada.

She studied writing with Frances Itani, Audrey Thomas, Bryan Moon, and Rita Donovan.

Many of her stories drew on her Polish background.

Her short stories appeared in many literary journals and won several competitions. Her story "Bones" was nominated for the 1996 Journey Prize.

== Death and legacy ==
Gleed died 11 December 1996. A collection, One of the Chosen, was published posthumously by BuschekBooks in 1997. In the same year, John Gleed endowed the Danuta Gleed Literary Award in honour of his late wife. The annual award recognizes a first collection of short fiction by a Canadian author writing in English.
