= Frances Boyle =

Canadian writer

Frances Boyle (born 1954) is a Canadian writer from Ottawa, Ontario. Her debut short story collection Seeking Shade, published in 2020, was nominated for the 2021 ReLit Award for short fiction and the 2021 Danuta Gleed Literary Award.

She previously published the poetry collections Portal Stones, Light-carved Passages, Apples and Roses and This White Nest, and the novella Tower.
