= Joan Thomas =

Canadian novelist and book reviewer

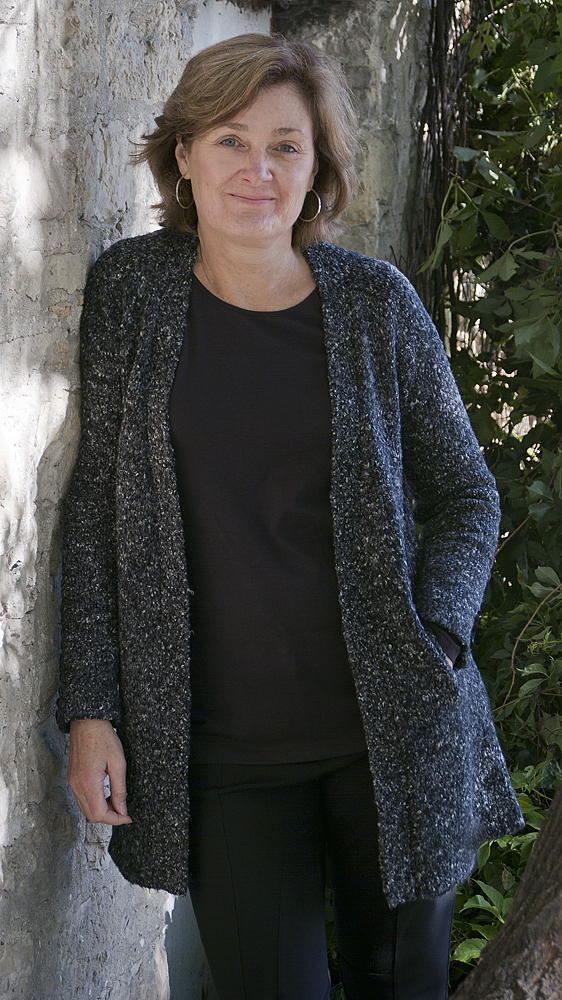
- Born: 1949 (age 76–77)
- Occupations: Novelist; Book reviewer; Journalist; Book editor
- Writing career
- Notable works: Reading by Lightning (2008); Curiosity (2010); The Opening Sky (2014); Five Wives (2019); Wild Hope (2023)
- Notable awards: Commonwealth Writers' Prize (2009); Amazon.ca First Novel Award (2009); Writers' Trust Engel/Findley Award (2014); Governor General's Award for English-language fiction (2019)
- Website: joanthomas.ca

Joan Thomas on Bookbits radio.

Joan Thomas (born 1949) is a Canadian novelist and book reviewer from Winnipeg, Manitoba.

== Biography ==
Thomas grew up in Carberry, Manitoba and later worked as a freelance journalist and book reviewer for The Globe and Mail, the Winnipeg Free Press and Prairie Fire, and as a book editor for Turnstone Press.

In an interview with The Ex-Puritan, Thomas explained how family stories from her grandfather, Walter Brass, and her aunt Elsie, influenced the writing and characters of Reading by Lightning.

== Awards and honours ==
=== Awards ===
- 1996: National Magazine Award for journalism.
- 2009: Commonwealth Writers' Prize, Best First Book (Canada and the Caribbean), for Reading by Lightning.
- 2009: Amazon.ca First Novel Award for Reading by Lightning.
- 2014: Writers' Trust Engel/Findley Award.
- 2015: McNally Robinson Book of the Year Award for The Opening Sky.
- 2019: Governor General's Award for English-language fiction for Five Wives.
- 2024: Howard Engel Award for Best Crime Novel Set in Canada, Crime Writers of Canada Awards of Excellence, for Wild Hope.

=== Shortlists ===
- 2009: McNally Robinson Book of the Year Award and Margaret Laurence Award for Fiction, for Reading by Lightning.
- 2011: McNally Robinson Book of the Year Award and Margaret Laurence Award for Fiction, for Curiosity.
- 2014: Governor General's Award for English-language fiction, for The Opening Sky.
- 2015: Carol Shields Winnipeg Book Award and Margaret Laurence Award for Fiction, for The Opening Sky.
- 2020: McNally Robinson Book of the Year Award and Margaret Laurence Award for Fiction, for Five Wives.

=== Longlists ===
- 2010: International Dublin Literary Award for Reading by Lightning.
- 2010: Scotiabank Giller Prize for Curiosity.
- 2012: International Dublin Literary Award for Curiosity.

== Bibliography ==
=== Novels ===
- Reading by Lightning, 2008 (Goose Lane Editions, ISBN 978-0-86492-512-1)
- Curiosity, 2010 (McClelland & Stewart, ISBN 978-0-7710-8417-1)
- The Opening Sky, 2014 (McClelland & Stewart, ISBN 978-0-7710-8392-1)
- Five Wives, 2019 (HarperCollins, ISBN 978-1443458542)
- Wild Hope, 2023 (HarperCollins, ISBN 978-1443468640
