= Andrew Boden (writer) =

Canadian writer

Andrew Boden is a Canadian writer, originally from Cranbrook, British Columbia, and currently based in Burnaby. His debut novel, When We Were Ashes, was published by Goose Lane Editions in 2024, and was a shortlisted finalist for the Amazon.ca First Novel Award in 2025.

He previously published the short story collection The Secret History of My Hometown in 2021.
