= The Porcupine's Quill =

Canadian independent publishing company

- Founded: 1974
- Country of origin: Canada
- Headquarters location: Erin, Ontario
- Distribution: University of Toronto Press
- Key people: Tim and Elke Inkster
- Publication types: Books, magazines
- Official website: www.porcupinesquill.ca

The Porcupine's Quill is an independent publishing company in Erin, Ontario, Canada. The Porcupine's Quill publishes contemporary Canadian literature, including poetry, fiction, art and literary criticism. It is owned and operated by Tim and Elke Inkster.

== History ==
In 1974, The Porcupine’s Quill (PQL) was originally incorporated as the production arm of Press Porcépic in Toronto, Ontario. It is owned and operated by husband-and-wife team Tim and Elke Inkster. The press is known for publishing fiction by new writers who go on to become established figures in the Canadian literary landscape, such as Jane Urquhart, Steven Heighton, Andrew Pyper, Mary Swan, Russell Smith, Gil Adamson, Elizabeth Hay, Michael Winter and Annabel Lyon. Alternatively, the press usually publishes poetry by already well-known poets, such as Margaret Avison and P. K. Page.

Its first title, Marzipan Lies by Brian Johnson, was published 1975. Early in The Porcupine's Quill's history, Tim Inkster contacted friends he met during his time at the University of Toronto to publish their work, such as collections of poetry by Ed Carson and Brian Henderson.

The Porcupine's Quill has published a number of award-winning work and was named as "Canada's pre-eminent literary press" in The Perilous Trade: Publishing Canada's Writers. Don Coles' collection of poetry, Forests of the Medieval World, won the Governor General's Award for Poetry in 1993. Later, in 2000, Don Coles' Kurgan won the Trillium Book Award. Most recently, a collection of short stories by Ian Colford entitled Evidence won the Margaret & John Savage First Book Award, was shortlisted for the Thomas H. Raddall Atlantic Fiction Prize and was furthermore shortlisted for the Danuta Gleed Literary Award. Evidence was also presented a silver medal by the Independent Publisher (IPPY). Sailor Girl by Sheree-Lee Olson, also published by The Porcupine's Quill, won the bronze medal. Off the Wall by Tony Urquhart, The Essential P K Page, and A Wood Engraver's Alphabet by G. Brender à Brandis were cited in the Alcuin Society of Vancouver's 27th annual Awards for Excellence in Book Design in Canada competition.

The owners, Tim and Elke Inkster, have also received praise for their contributions to the Canadian publishing industry. In 2008, both Inksters were appointed members of the Order of Canada by the Governor General of Canada.

== Operations ==
The Porcupine's Quill is unlike most other Canadian publishers in that it does most of its printing in-house. The Porcupine's Quill also prints The Devil's Artisan, a bi-annual magazine about printing and book arts in Canada.

Most printing is performed on a twenty-five inch Heidelberg KORD. The Porcupine's Quill usually uses acid-free Zephyr Antique laid paper, the sheets of which are then folded and sewn into signatures on a 1907 model Smyth National Book Sewing machine. This process results in more durable, sturdier books than are usually produced by trade book publishers. Tim Inkster has created videos on YouTube that demonstrate this printing and binding process.
