= Zsuzsi Gartner =

Canadian author and journalist

- Born: 4 May 1960 (age 66) Winnipeg, Manitoba, Canada
- Education: University of Calgary (BA); Carleton University; University of British Columbia (MFA)

Zsuzsi Gartner (born 4 May 1960 in Winnipeg) is a Canadian author and journalist. She regularly writes for The Globe and Mail, the Vancouver Sun, Quill & Quire, Canadian Business, and Western Living.

== Biography ==
Gartner was born 4 May 1960, in Winnipeg and moved to Calgary in early childhood. She earned a Bachelor of Arts in political science at the University of Calgary, later receiving an honours degree in journalism from Carleton University in Ottawa and a Master of Fine Arts from the University of British Columbia in Vancouver, where she currently resides.

Gartner started her career as a newspaper and magazine journalist for a number of publications, including the Vancouver Sun, The Globe and Mail, Saturday Night, Quill & Quire, The Georgia Straight, Western Living and Canadian Business. She has worked as a senior editor at Saturday Night and books editor for The Georgia Straight.

She is also a writer of short stories, which have appeared in a number of publications. She published a collection of these stories, All the Anxious Girls on Earth in 1999.

Gartner has been writer-in-residence at the University of British Columbia and a member of the faculty at Banff Centre's Writing Studios.

Gartner defended Mordecai Richler's novel Barney's Version on the CBC's Canada Reads 2004.

She also founded and directs Writers Adventure Camp in Whistler, British Columbia.

== Awards and honours ==
Gartner's work has brought her three Western Magazine Awards, including a Gold Award in 2003 for feature writing. In 2005, she won the Canadian National Magazine Awards' Silver award for Fiction.

Awards for Gartner's writing
Year	Title	Award	Result	Ref.
2011	Better Living Through Plastic Explosives	Scotiabank Giller Prize	Shortlist	
2020	The Beguiling	Rogers Writers' Trust Fiction Prize	Shortlist	

== Bibliography ==
- All the Anxious Girls on Earth (1999)
- Darwin's Bastards (2009) – editor
- Better Living Through Plastic Explosives (2011)
- The Beguiling (2020)
