= Eliza Robertson =

Canadian writer

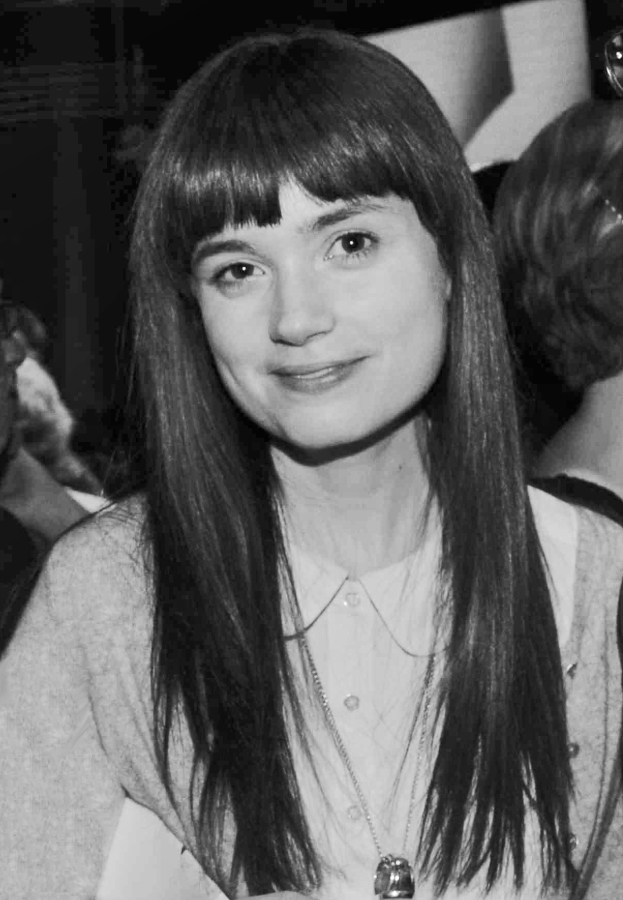
- Born: Vancouver, British Columbia, Canada
- Education: University of Victoria; University of East Anglia
- Occupation: Writer
- Writing career
- Language: English
- Notable awards: Commonwealth Short Story Prize (2013)

Eliza K. Robertson is a Canadian writer.

== Education ==
Robertson studied creative writing and political science at the University of Victoria and graduated with an MA in creative writing from the University of East Anglia in 2012, where she pursued a PhD in Creative and Critical Writing.

== Career ==
Robertson was a joint winner of the 2013 Commonwealth Short Story Prize and has been longlisted twice for the prestigious Writers' Trust of Canada's Journey Prize. She was a Journey Prize finalist in 2013 for "My Sister Sang."

Robertson's first full-length novel, Demi-Gods, was released in 2017.

== Awards ==
- 2013 Journey Prize finalist for "My Sister Sang," published in Grain
- 2013 Commonwealth Short Story Prize, "We Walked on Water", published in Granta
- 2017 Elizabeth Jolley Short Story Prize, "Pheidippides"

== Bibliography ==
- —— (2014). Wallflowers. New York: Bloomsbury. ISBN 9781620408155.
- —— (2017). Demi-Gods. London: Bloomsbury. ISBN 9781408890394.
- Robertson, Eliza; Aoyogi, Nora (illustrator) (2019). Spur, a Wolf's Story. Greystone Kids. ISBN 9781375042864.
- Robertson, Eliza; Dolphin, Myles (2023). I Got a Name: The Murder of Krystal Senyk. Hamish Hamilton. ISBN 9780735240049.
