= Kathryn Kuitenbrouwer =

Canadian novelist and short story writer (born 1965)

- Born: February 6, 1965 (age 61)
- Occupations: novelist, short story writer
- Writing career
- Period: 2000s-present
- Notable works: Way Up, The Nettle Spinner, All the Broken Things
- Website: Official website

Kathryn Kuitenbrouwer (born February 6, 1965) is a Canadian novelist, short story writer, and writing mentor.

== Early life ==
Kuitenbrouwer was born in Ottawa, Ontario, and later moved to Toronto.

== Career ==
Her debut short story collection, Way Up, was published in 2003. It was a shortlisted finalist for the Danuta Gleed Literary Award and the ReLit Award for short fiction in 2004. Her first novel, The Nettle Spinner, was published in 2005, and was a shortlisted nominee for the Amazon.ca First Novel Award. Her second novel, Perfecting, followed in 2009. Her most recent novel, All the Broken Things, was published in 2014 by Random House of Canada. It was a shortlisted finalist for the Toronto Book Award, long listed for Canada Reads in 2016, and was a national bestseller.

Kuitenbrouwer has also been a book reviewer for The Globe and Mail and the National Post, and has published short fiction in Granta, The Walrus, Numéro Cinq, Significant Objects, Maclean's Magazine, and Storyville.

In 2018, Kuitenbrouwer received a Ph.D. in English literature from the University of Toronto, where she was supervised by Mari Ruti. Her Ph.D. thesis is a psychoanalytic investigation into creativity, with special attention to the British novel in the eighteenth century.

In 2023 she published the novel Wait Softly Brother, which was longlisted for the Giller Prize.

As of 2025, Kuitenbrouwer is a writing mentor in the Master of Fine Arts in Fiction program at the University of King's College in Halifax, Nova Scotia.
