= Nicholas Herring =

Canadian writer

- Education: St. Jerome's University; University of Toronto
- Occupation: Novelist
- Writing career
- Notable work: Some Hellish (2022)
- Notable awards: Atwood Gibson Writers' Trust Fiction Prize (2022)

Nicholas Herring is a Canadian writer from Murray Harbour, Prince Edward Island, whose debut novel Some Hellish was the winner of the 2022 Atwood Gibson Writers' Trust Fiction Prize.

He studied English at St. Jerome's University, and creative writing at the University of Toronto.

His second novel, Your Breath in Charcoal, won the 2026 Giller Prize.

== Works ==
- Some Hellish (2022)
- Your Breath in Charcoal (2026)
