= Krista Bridge =

Canadian writer

- Occupations: novelist, short story writer
- Writing career
- Period: 2000s–present
- Notable work: The Eliot Girls

Krista Bridge is a Canadian writer, whose debut novel The Eliot Girls was a shortlisted nominee for the 2013 Rogers Writers' Trust Fiction Prize and the 2014 Amazon.ca First Novel Award.

She was also previously nominated for the ReLit Award and the Danuta Gleed Literary Award for her short story collection The Virgin Spy in 2007.

From Toronto, Ontario, Bridge was educated at St. Clement's School, and later studied creative writing at the Humber School for Writers. She published her first short story in Toronto Life in 2002.

== Works ==
- The Virgin Spy (2006, ISBN 978-1553651628)
- The Eliot Girls (2013, ISBN 978-1553659822)
