= Douglas Lochhead =

Canadian writer (1922–2011)

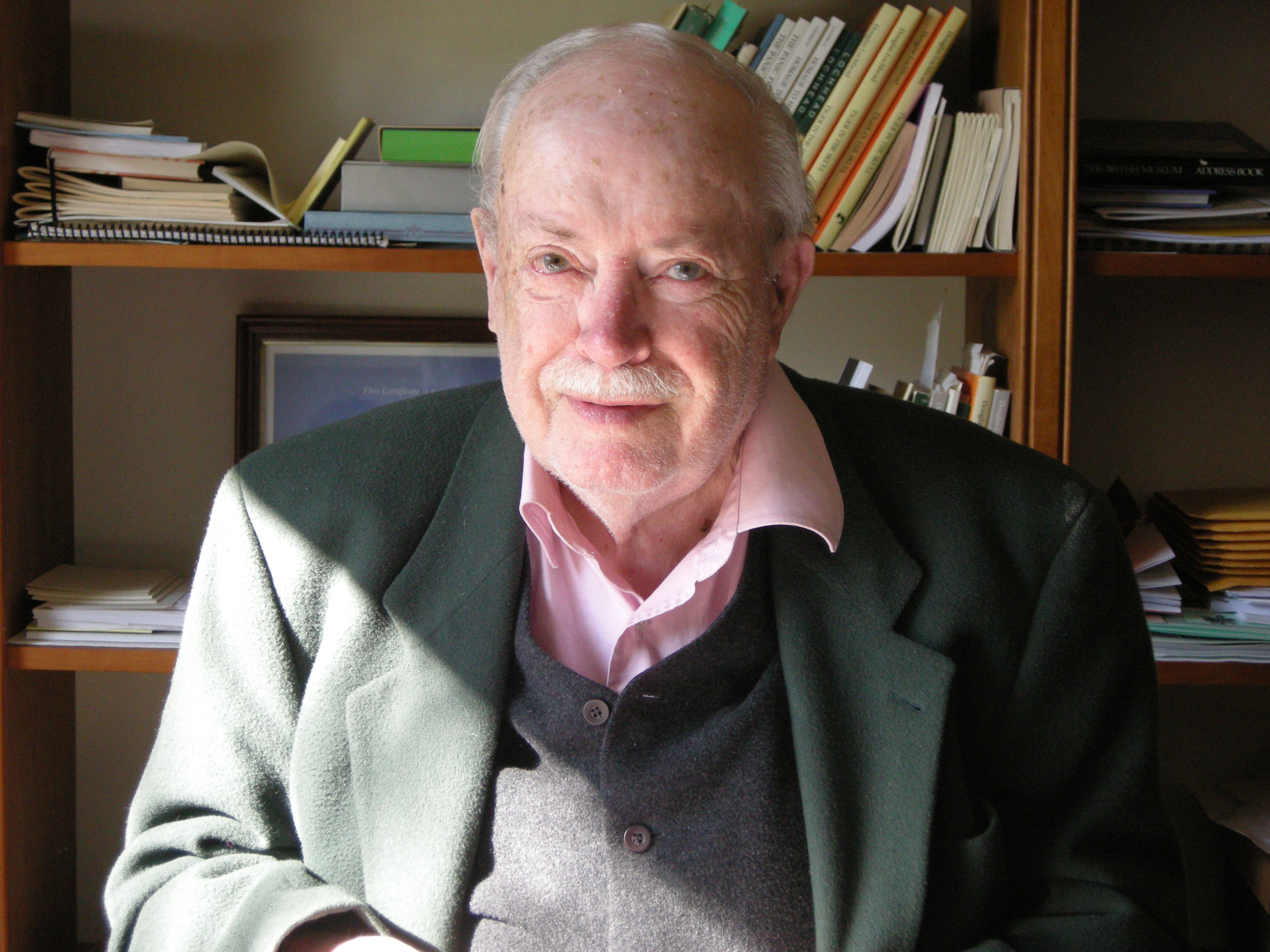
- Douglas Lochhead in 2008
- Born: March 25, 1922; Guelph, Ontario
- Died: March 15, 2011 (aged 88); Sackville, New Brunswick
- Citizenship: Canadian
- Education: McGill University
- Occupations: Poet, bibliographer, librarian, professor
- Spouse: Jean St. Clair Beckwith (1924–1991)
- Writing career
- Genre: Poetry
- Notable works: High Marsh Road, Dykelands, Love on the Marsh

Douglas Grant Lochhead (pronounced Lock-heed) FRSC (March 25, 1922 – March 15, 2011) was a Canadian poet, academic librarian, bibliographer and university professor who published more than 30 collections of poetry over five decades, from 1959 to 2009. He was a founding member and vice-chairman of the League of Canadian Poets and was elected its first secretary in 1968. He served as president of the Bibliographical Society of Canada (1974–1976), and was a member of bibliographical societies in the U.S. and Britain. In 1976, he was named a Fellow of the Royal Society of Canada.

Lochhead's best-known book, High Marsh Road, a collection of 122 short poems chronicling his daily walks across the Tantramar Marshes in southeastern New Brunswick, earned him a nomination for a Governor General's Award in 1980. In 2005, when High Marsh Road/La Strada di Tantramar was awarded the Carlo Betocchi International Poetry Prize, Lochhead became the first non-Italian writer to win it. He also received the Alden Nowlan Award for Excellence in English-language Literary Arts in 2001 and the following year, became the first poet laureate for the town of Sackville, New Brunswick, where he had lived since joining the faculty at Mount Allison University in 1975. The first 30 poems in High Marsh Road are posted on telephone poles leading from Sackville's main downtown intersection toward the marshes that so often stirred "the red sea of his singing".

During his academic career, Douglas Lochhead held library appointments at several universities including Cornell, Dalhousie and York, before his appointment as Founding Librarian of Massey College at the University of Toronto in 1963. After he became Davidson Chair of Canadian Studies at Mount Allison in 1975, Lochhead continued writing and publishing his many collections of poetry.

"I think Douglas thought of poetry as a form of resistance," his friend and fellow poet Peter Sanger told The Globe and Mail following Lochhead's death in 2011. "A form o[f] resistance to non-poetic thinking, to tyranny, to unimaginative views of the world."

== Maritime roots ==
Douglas Lochhead was born March 25, 1922, in Guelph, Ontario, where his father, Allan Grant Lochhead, worked as a microbiologist and research scientist at the Malt Products Company of Canada. The family moved the next year when Grant Lochhead landed a job as Dominion Agricultural Biologist at the Central Experimental Farm in Ottawa.

Lochhead's mother, Helen Van Wart, was an accomplished pianist and piano teacher who was born in Saint John, New Brunswick. "I was rushed to Fredericton at the age of two or three months to be baptized," Lochhead told an interviewer in 1988, adding that the ceremony took place in the home of his maternal grandparents. He agreed that although he lived and went to school for most of the year in Ottawa, as a boy, his heart was in Canada's Maritime provinces. "We heard so much about it from my mother, who was a great Maritimer, but not overbearing, not tiresome—she had a healthy, natural enthusiasm about where she was from." As a result of his mother's Maritime roots, Lochhead spent his boyhood summers at Duck Cove, near Saint John on the Bay of Fundy. Years later, he wrote about the significance of the early experiences he had there. "[F]or me, they help to explain the sense and feeling of place and people, which have become part of my poetry. They help to account for a closeness, a confidence which I have in being in the Maritimes."

Lochhead's only sibling, Kenneth was born in 1926. The brothers spent most of their holidays together in New Brunswick and shared a fascination with their parents' forested cottage property on the Gatineau River north of Hull, Quebec. Kenneth, who became one of Canada's foremost painters, recalled how his family loved the natural beauty of the place: "My mother didn't want anything cut; the trillium would come up, and that was a sacred rite of spring...And my brother looking at birds and mother waiting for certain birds to appear; these images were poignant in the excitement of their experience and connection." Over the years, Douglas Lochhead wrote several poems set in the Gatineau, while Kenneth painted a series of landscapes there. Lochhead's last collection Looking into Trees includes poems inspired by his brother's paintings which are also reproduced in the book.

== Education and military service ==
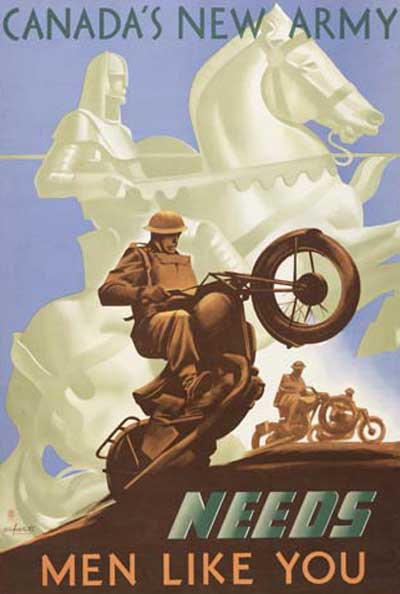
Second World War poster

In 1939, Douglas Lochhead enrolled in the pre-medical program at McGill University following in the scientific footsteps of his microbiologist father and his paternal grandfather William Lochhead who taught botany, genetics, geology and zoology at Macdonald College in Sainte-Anne-de-Bellevue, Quebec, and who, in 1908, had founded the Quebec Society for the Protection of Plants from Insects and Fungous Diseases. Douglas Lochhead remembered spending many enjoyable hours in his grandfather's library reading his scientific papers, his collection of 19th century poetry and books by authors ranging from Darwin to Dickens. Lochhead completed his pre-medical Bachelor of Arts degree in 1943 and was accepted into medicine.

But instead Lochhead joined the Canadian Army. He received training first, as an artillery officer, and then, in the infantry. He attained the rank of lieutenant, but the Second World War ended in Europe before he could be sent to the front. He then volunteered to fight in the Pacific War, but it too ended before he could be trained as a paratrooper. His experiences in the Canadian military formed the basis for his 1984 book, The Panic Field: Prose Poems in which he explores "the ways of men, caught up in the sprawling net of the army."

Lochhead was still in the army when he attended a friend's wedding in Toronto. He visited the University of Toronto campus and suddenly decided to pursue post-graduate studies there in English. He wrote his thesis on the British poets of the First World War earning his Master's degree in 1947.

== Marriage and library career ==
After graduating from the U. of T., Douglas Lochhead drifted here and there from a job as an advertising copywriter to work as a government information officer. In 1948, he met Jean St. Clair Beckwith, a native of Cape Breton who was working as a librarian at the Toronto Public Library. They married the next year and at her suggestion, Lochhead enrolled at McGill University where he received his Bachelor of Library Science in 1951. The degree led to a career in the libraries of five universities.

=== From west to east ===
In 1951–1952, Lochhead served as chief librarian at Victoria College, now the University of Victoria, in Victoria, British Columbia. When he wrote to Cornell seeking a job there because he had heard about the beauty of its library and campus, he received a telegram back offering him a job. He served at Cornell as cataloguing librarian until 1953, when he was offered the university or chief librarian's position at Dalhousie University in Halifax, Nova Scotia.

After seven years in Halifax, Lochhead became the first director of libraries in 1960 at the fledgling York University in Toronto. He helped plan and organize two large libraries there. "I was so busy buying books, I had to work like blazes to spend the money," he told an interviewer many years later. While at York, he also served as an assistant professor of English, but disliked the heavy administrative workload associated with running the libraries.

=== Massey College ===
Exterior of Massey College

In 1963, Lochhead was recruited by writer Robertson Davies, Master of Massey College at the University of Toronto, to found the library there. Aside from running the library, he taught bibliography, the history of printing and also served as a professor of English.

Lochhead had first become interested in bibliography, printing and the history of the book at Dalhousie. He developed those interests at Massey College as he and Davies built its bibliographical collection so that the Massey library would be useful to the whole university. "[W]e decided to build as complete a collection of every Canadian imprint, every impression, edition, or whatever, of Canadian poetry and prose," he said. "So, the Massey library and my interests both became biographical."

At the same time, Lochhead expanded his knowledge of printing techniques with hand presses that used metal and wood type. He and his students also experimented with paper making. "I remember Rob Davies saying, 'I was going by the printing room, and I heard your students laughing. It's the first time I ever heard laughter coming out of the class on bibliography,'" Lochhead said later. "Well, we did laugh—we'd get ink all over ourselves, we'd make mistakes, and I also had anecdotes to tell, the things you pick up in teaching, you know."

== Tantramar revisited ==
Douglas Lochhead left Massey College in 1975 to become Edgar and Dorothy Davidson Chair of Canadian Studies at Mount Allison University in Sackville, New Brunswick. He told an interviewer later that he spent his first two years teaching and finding a centre for the program. He also extended its curriculum and, as always, continued writing poetry inspired by the unique geography around Sackville. The town occupies uplands overlooking a broad expanse of tidal, saltwater marsh that has long inspired poets such as Charles G.D. Roberts and Bliss Carman. Lochhead first saw the Tantramar Marshes from a troop train on his way to England during the Second World War. After moving to Sackville, he visited them nearly every day where he watched the many flocks of migrating birds and closely observed the landscape that became an important subject for his poems.

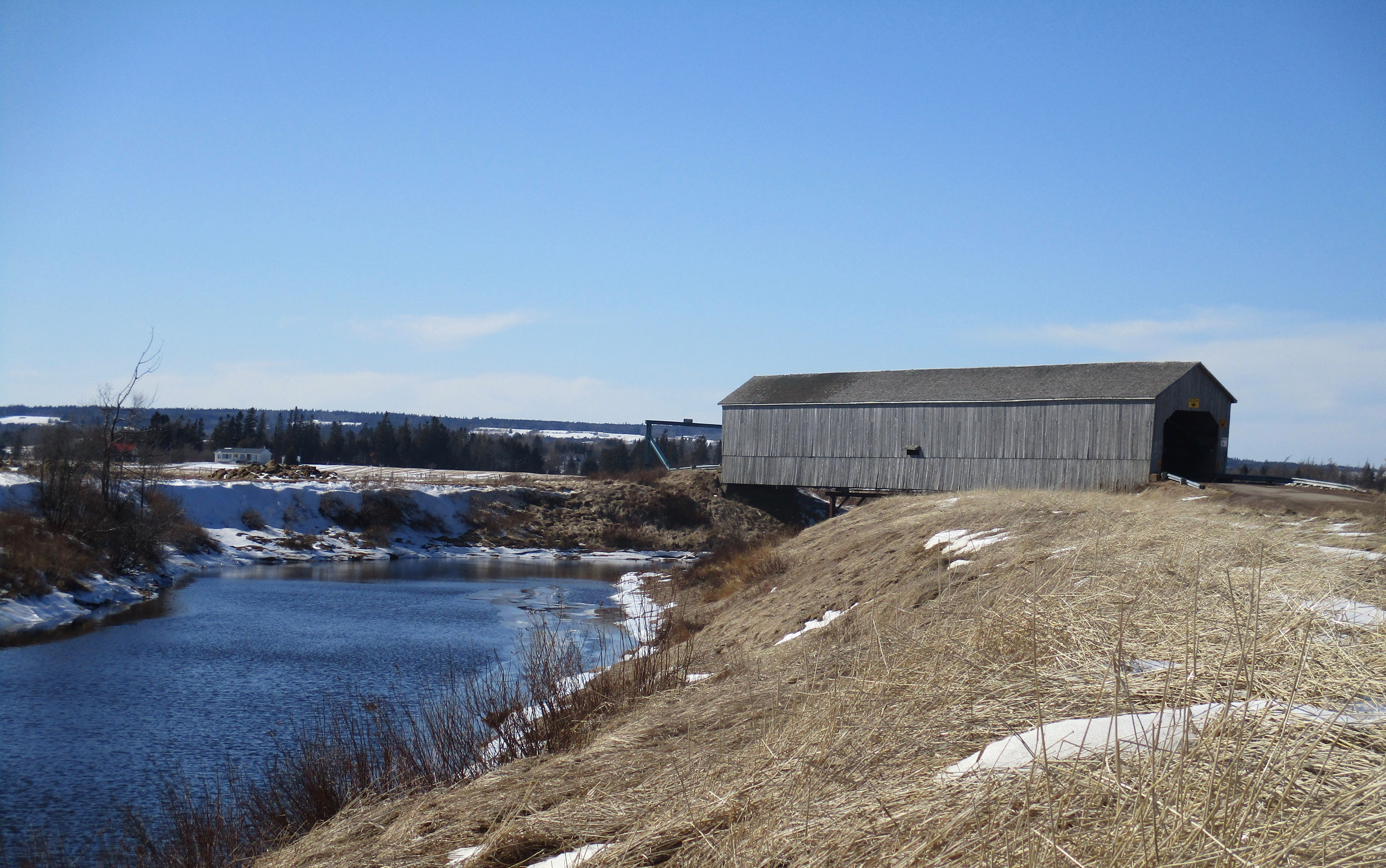
The covered bridge

September 22

the horse limps out of the covered
bridge. a girl leads it. she is
teaching it to go into darkness. into
new noises, silences. into darkness.
yes

---High Marsh Road

Lochhead retired from teaching at Mount Allison in 1987 to accept a three-year appointment as the university's first writer-in-residence. After his formal retirement in 1990, he produced 16 more books of poetry. "A day Douglas didn't write was a day lost," his friend Peter Sanger told a New Brunswick newspaper. "For him, poetry was celebration and he wanted others to share that celebration."

When his wife, Jean, died of cancer in 1991, Lochhead elegized her in the sequence Black Festival (1991) and in "Elegies 1-10," which appeared in Homage to Henry Alline & Other Poems (1992). In 1998, heart problems required him to undergo triple-bypass surgery. He was named Sackville's first poet laureate in 2002 in recognition of his status as a writer whose work reflected an intense interest in and sensitivity to local places. Increasingly frail, he moved to a Sackville nursing home in 2009 and died there on March 15, 2011.

== Honours ==
In 1977, Lochhead received the Queen Elizabeth II Silver Jubilee Medal. The Bibliographical Society of Canada awarded him the Marie Tremaine Medal in 1985. In 1987 he received honorary doctorates from Saint Mary's University (D.Litt.) and Dalhousie University (L.L.D). In 2006, the University of New Brunswick awarded Lochhead an honorary doctor of letters degree. His High Marsh Road was a finalist for the Governor-General's Award for Poetry, and in 2005 he received the Carlo Betocchi International Poetry Prize for High Marsh Road / La Strada di Tantramar. He was also a recipient of the Alden Nowlan Award for Excellence in English-language Literary Arts.

The Red Jeep and Other Landscapes: A Collection in Honour of Douglas Lochhead, edited by Peter Thomas, appeared on his retirement in 1987.

== Works ==
- The Heart is Fire (1959)
- An old woman looks out on Gabarus Bay remembering history, June 8, 1958 (1959)
- It Is All Around (1960)
- Shepherds Before Kings (1963)
- Poet Talking (1964)
- A & B & C &: An Alphabet (1969)
- Millwood Road Poems (1970)
- Prayers in a Field: Ten Poems (1974)
- The Full Furnace: Collected Poems (1975)
- High Marsh Road: Lines for a Diary (1980). Published in Italian as La Strada di Tantramar (2004)
- A & E, 16/3/80-23/3/80: A Long Poem. (1980; rev. ed. Harrier Editions, 1998) ISBN 0-919271-09-X
- Battle Sequence: Poems (1980)
- The Panic Field: Prose Poems (1984)
- Tiger in the Skull: New and Selected Poems, 1959-1985. Fiddlehead Poetry Books/Goose Lane Editions (1986) ISBN 0-86492-072-5
- Upper Cape Poems. Goose Lane Editions (1989) ISBN 0-86492-100-4.
- Dykelands (With Thaddeus Holownia) (1989) ISBN 0-7735-0722-1
- Black Festival: A Long Poem (1991) ISBN 0-919271-03-0
- Homage to Henry Alline and Other Poems (1992) ISBN 0-86492-125-X
- Charlie, Boo Boo, Nutley Clutch and others: Twelve Canadian Jollies, Lovelies: Poems (1997)
- Breakfast at Mel's and Other Poems of Love and Places (1997) ISBN 0-86492-228-0
- All Things Do Continue: Poems of Celebration (1997) ISBN 0-9697802-5-7
- Millwood Road Poems (1998) ISBN 0-919271-10-3.
- The Lucretius Poems (1998) ISBN 0-919271-08-1
- Cape Enragé: Poems on a Raised Beach (2000)
- Yes, Yes, Yes! (2001)
- Orkney: October Diary (2002)
- Weathers: Poems New & Selected (2002)
- Fragmenta: 80 Wisdoms (2003)
- Midgic: A Place, a Poem (2003)
- That Place by Tantramar, Sackville, New Brunswick: Poems (2007)
- Love on the Marsh: A Long Poem (Sackville NB: Sybertooth, 2008) ISBN 978-0-9739505-3-3
- Looking into Trees (Sackville NB: Sybertooth, 2009) ISBN 978-0-9810244-3-1
- Letters from Helen, ed.(Sackville NB: Sybertooth, 2010) ISBN 978-0-9810244-9-3

=== Anthologies ===
- Coastlines: The Poetry of Atlantic Canada, ed. Anne Compton, Laurence Hutchman, Ross Leckie and Robin McGrath (Goose Lane Editions, 2002)
