= Paul Marlowe =

Canadian writer

Paul Marlowe is a Canadian author of historical fiction and science fiction. Much of his historical fiction is connected in some way with the Etheric Explorers Club, a Victorian society devoted to investigating unusual or supernatural phenomena.

== Published works ==
=== Radio plays ===
- The Resident Member (2009)

The Resident Member is a 30-minute comedy featuring the voice acting of Gideon Emery, Joe Vaz, Damon Berry, Digby Young, and Christa Schamberger-Young.

=== Series ===
==== The Wellborn Conspiracy ====
- Sporeville (Sybertooth Incorporated, 2007) ISBN 9780973950540.
- Knights of the Sea (2010)

=== Collections ===
- Ether Frolics: Nine Tales from the Etheric Explorers Club (2012)

=== Short stories ===
- Scientia Potentia Est (2000)
- Airship Voyages Made Easy (2000)
- For we being many... (2003)
- A Visit from Prospero (2003)
- Resurrection and Life (2004)
- Krasnaya Luna (2004)
- Venera Redux (2006)
- The Night of Sevens (2006)
- Ten Golden Roosters (2006)
- The Mud Men of Tower Tunnel (2007)
- The Incident at the 27th Meeting (2007)
- 66° South (2007)
- The Resident Member (2008)
- Alpha and Omega (2011)
- Cotton Avicenna B iv (2011)
- The Grinsfield Penitent (2014)

== Awards and honours ==
- 2008 — Sporeville was selected for Resource Links magazine's 2007 Year's Best list
- 2010 — Marlowe's The Saguenay Cheese won a first prize in the James McIntyre poetry contest
- 2013 — Ether Frolics was short listed for the Danuta Gleed Literary Award

== See also ==
- List of Canadian writers
