= Overqualified (short story collection) =

Art project by Joey Comeau

- Author: Joey Comeau
- Language: English
- Subject: cover letters
- Publisher: ECW Press
- Publication date: 2009
- Publication place: Canada
- Media type: print
- Pages: 144 pp
- ISBN: 1-55022-858-7
- OCLC: 262886033
- Preceded by: It's Too Late To Say I'm Sorry (2007)

Overqualified is an art project by Canadian writer Joey Comeau in which he wrote a series of cover letters as job applications to companies. The letters were collected into a book and published as Overqualified by ECW Press in 2009. The letters all start off as standard cover letters, but quickly turn very dark, and almost inevitably reveal the author to be mentally unstable. Excerpts from the book were included in the 2010 Best American Nonrequired Reading.
