= Lee Henderson =

Canadian writer

Lee Henderson is a Canadian writer, the author of The Broken Record Technique (Penguin Canada 2002), The Man Game (Penguin Canada, August 2008), and The Road Narrows As You Go (Hamish Hamilton, 2014). The Broken Record Technique won the 2003 Danuta Gleed Literary Award, which recognizes the first collection of short fiction by a Canadian author writing in English. The Man Game was shortlisted for the 2008 Rogers Writers' Trust Fiction Prize and won the 2009 Ethel Wilson Fiction Prize as well as the 2009 City of Vancouver Book Award.

He was born in Saskatoon, Saskatchewan, and raised there and in Calgary, Alberta. He currently resides in Victoria, British Columbia. His short stories have appeared in several publications and his journalism has been featured in The Vancouver Sun. His short story "Sheep Dub" was included in the 2000 Journey Prize Anthology and "Conjugation" appeared in the 2006 Journey Prize Anthology; it was shortlisted for the Journey Prize Award. He is a contributing editor for the visual art magazines Border Crossings and Contemporary, for which he writes on Vancouver art and artists.

In 2021, Henderson, Emily Anglin, Jean Marc Ah-Sen, and Devon Code published Disintegration in Four Parts, a volume collecting one novella by each of the four writers.

== Bibliography ==
- The Broken Record Technique (2002), ISBN 0-14-100568-8
- The Man Game (2008), ISBN 0-670-91147-X
- The Road Narrows As You Go (2014) ISBN 0670069892
