= Joey Comeau =

Canadian writer

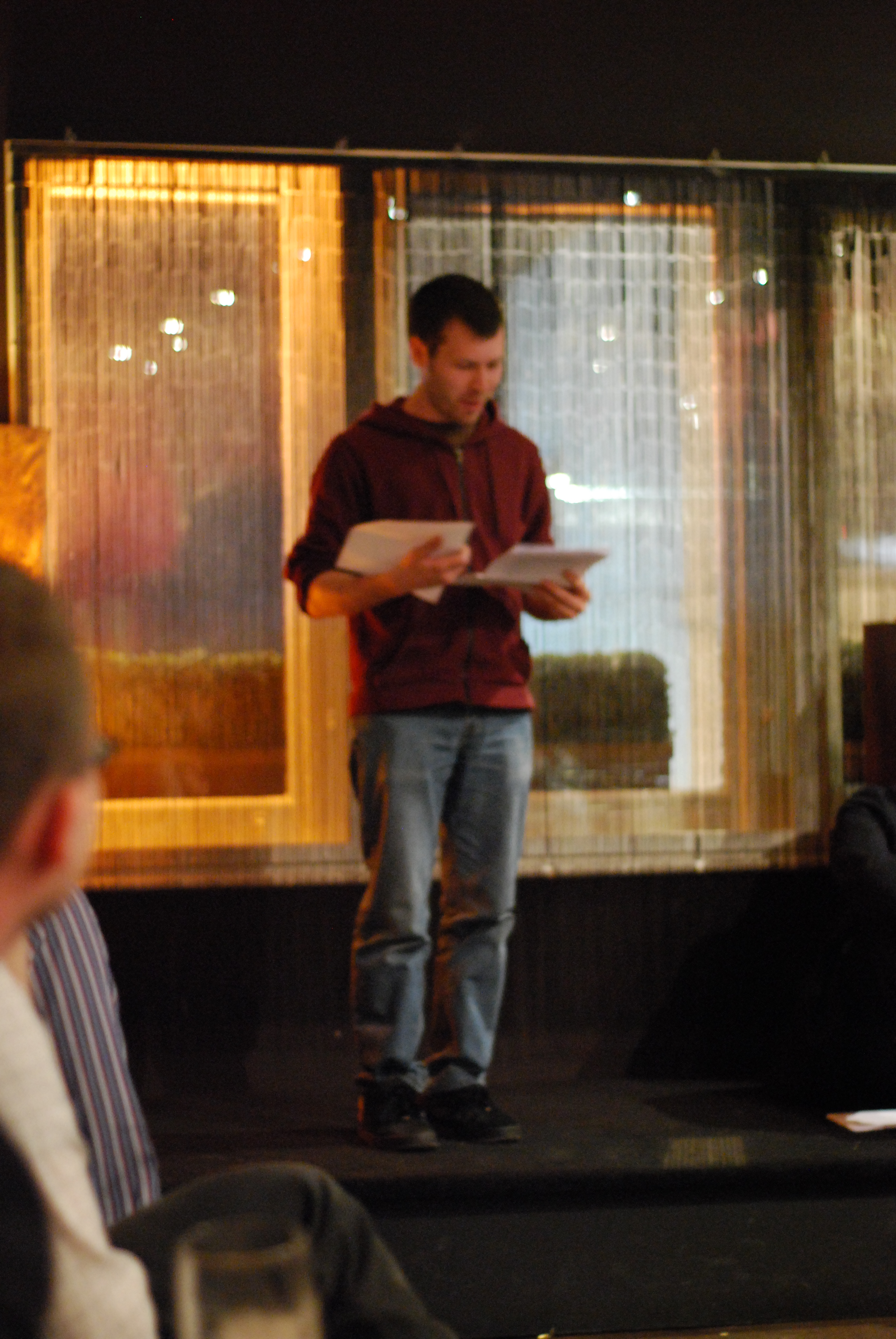
- Joey Comeau in London, England, April 2008
- Born: Joey Comeau; September 26, 1980 (age 45); Edmonton, Alberta, Canada
- Occupation: Writer
- Writing career
- Subjects: Transgressive fiction, horror
- Notable works: A Softer World, Overqualified, Lockpick Pornography
- Website: www.asofterworld.com

Joey Comeau (born September 26, 1980) is a Canadian writer. He wrote the text of the webcomic A Softer World, and authored the novels Lockpick Pornography and Overqualified.

== Career ==
In 2003, Comeau co-created the webcomic A Softer World with Emily Horne. His first novel, Lockpick Pornography, was serialized on the A Softer World site prior to publication in book form by Loose Teeth Press.

Excerpts from his novel Overqualified were included in the 2010 Best American Nonrequired Reading. The first 20 chapters of his novel One Bloody Thing After Another were serialized on the National Post's book blog and the book was nominated for the 2010 Shirley Jackson Award. One Bloody Thing After Another was also nominated for the 2011 ReLit Awards. The Globe and Mail review of One Bloody Thing After Another was generally critical, concluding that the novel did not succeed as either horror or comedy, while the reviewer in the Toronto Star wrote "As a fast-paced, fragmented tale of terror for an accelerated culture, it's bloody good."

In 2012, a sequel to Lockpick Pornography titled We All Got It Coming was released for free on the Internet before being published together with the original in The Complete Lockpick Pornography.

A review of Comeau's 2017 novel Malagash in The Globe and Mail called it "a surprisingly quiet, moody affair", but observed that "some characters and plot lines could be more deeply developed",

=== Kickstarter campaign ===
In 2013, Comeau and collaborator Emily Horne ran a successful Kickstarter campaign to publish the fourth print volume of A Softer World, titled Let's Do Something Wrong. The campaign raised over $78,000, on a goal of $25,000. The project was described as being "A book about dead moms, queers, sexy extremism and sad feelings. In photo comic form with words on the photos, like, over top of them!".

=== Recognition ===
- 2011 Finalist, Shirley Jackson Award
- 2017 Anne Green award recipient
- 2018 American Library Association Alex Award winner
- 2018 Golden Cowbell Award (Swiss Group of International Schools (SGIS)) for Ninja-rella.

== Personal life ==
Comeau describes himself as queer. He studied linguistics at Saint Mary's University. He currently lives in Toronto, Ontario, Canada.

== Bibliography ==
- Lockpick Pornography (Loose Teeth, 2005)
- Truth and Beauty Bombs (A Softer World book 1) (Loose Teeth, 2006)
- It's Too Late To Say I'm Sorry (Loose Teeth, 2007)
- Overqualified (ECW, 2009)
- Second Best Isn't So Bad (A Softer World book 2) (Topatoco, 2009)
- One Bloody Thing After Another (ECW, 2010)
- Bible Camp Bloodbath (self published, 2010)
- The Girl Who Couldn't Come (self published, 2011)
- Everybody Gets Got (A Softer World book 3) (Topatoco, 2012)
- The Complete Lockpick Pornography (ECW, 2012)
- Bravest Warriors Vol. 1 (Comic series collection) (KaBOOM!, 2013)
- The Summer is Ended and We are Not Yet Saved (ChiZine, 2013)
- Let's Do Something Wrong (A Softer World book 4) (Topatoco, 2014)
- We Are Become Pals (Topatoco, 2013)
- Bravest Warriors Vol. 2 (Comic series collection) (KaBOOM!, 2014)
- Bravest Warriors Vol. 3 (Comic series collection) (KaBOOM!, 2014)
- Ninja-rella (Capstone Press, 2015)
- Overqualified 2: Overqualifieder (ECW, 2015)
- Anatomy of Melancholy (A Softer World Best-of collection) (Breadpig, 2016)
- Ben Size Fazlayım (Turkish translation of Overqualified) (Tefrika Yayınları, 2016)
- Lockpick Pornography (German translation) (Luftschacht Verlag, 2016)
- Surqualifié. Lettres à des sociétés sans visage (French Translation of Overqualified) (Mémoire d'encrier, 2017)
- Malagash (ECW, 2017)
- Malagash (Chinese translation) (Bai Hua Zhou literature and Art Publishing House, 2018)
- Überqualifiziert (German Edition of Overqualified) (Luftschacht Verlag, 2018)
- Ask-Ninjan (Swedish translation of Ninjarella) (Hegas Förlag, 2020)
- Ninja-cienta (Spanish translation of Ninjarella) (Aparicio Publishing, 2020)
- Malagash (German translation) (Luftschacht Verlag, 2021)
- Undead Hungry Grandmother Birthday Party (Self published, 2025)
