= Douglas Glover (writer) =

Canadian writer (born 1948)

- Born: 14 November 1948 (age 78); Simcoe, Ontario, Canada
- Education: York University (BA); University of Edinburgh (MLitt); University of Iowa (MFA)
- Occupations: Novelist; short story writer; essayist; editor
- Writing career
- Notable works: A Guide to Animal Behaviour; The Life and Times of Captain N.; Elle
- Notable awards: Governor General's Award for Fiction (2003); Timothy Findley Award (2006)
- Website: douglasglover.net

Douglas Glover (born 14 November 1948 in Simcoe, Ontario. Canada) is a Canadian writer. He has published five short story collections, four novels (including Elle which won the 2003 Governor-General's Award for Fiction), three books of essays, and The Enamoured Knight, a monograph on Don Quixote and novel form.

== Early life and education ==
Glover was raised on his family's tobacco farm just outside Waterford, Ontario. He received a Bachelor of Arts degree in philosophy from York University in 1969 and a Master of Letters in philosophy at the University of Edinburgh in 1971. In 1982, he received a Master of Fine Arts from the University of Iowa's Iowa Writers' Workshop.

== Career ==
=== Early teaching and journalism ===
He taught philosophy at the University of New Brunswick in 1971–72 and then worked as a reporter and editor on newspapers in Saint John, New Brunswick; Peterborough, Ontario; Montreal, Quebec; and Saskatoon, Saskatchewan, until 1979.

=== Books ===
His 1993 novel, The Life and Times of Captain N., was edited by Gordon Lish and released by Alfred A. Knopf. His most recent book is an essay collection, The Erotics of Restraint: Essays on Literary Form (Biblioasis, 2019).

=== Broadcasting and editorial work ===
From October 1994 to October 1996, he was host of a weekly radio interview program called The Book Show at WAMC in Albany, NY. From 1994 to 2006, he edited the annual anthology Best Canadian Stories.

From 2010 to 2013, he wrote regularly for the international affairs magazine Global Brief. In 2010, he founded the online literary magazine, Numéro Cinq, which he edited until it ceased publication in August 2017.

=== Teaching and residencies ===
He has taught at Skidmore College, Colgate University, Vermont College of Fine Arts, and the University of Albany. He was the 2005 McGee Professor of Writing at Davidson College. He has been writer-in-residence at University of New Brunswick, Saint Thomas University, the University of Lethbridge and Utah State University.

== Personal life ==
He has two sons Jacob Glover and Jonah Glover.

== Awards and recognition ==
=== Wins ===
- 2003: winner, Governor General's Award for Fiction for Elle
- 2006: Writers' Trust of Canada Timothy Findley Award

=== Finalist selections ===
- 1984: finalist, Books in Canada First Novel Award for Precious
- 1991: finalist, Governor General's Award for Fiction for A Guide to Animal Behaviour
- 2004: Elle was the English to French translation finalist for the Governor General's Award for Translation
- 2005: finalist, International Dublin Literary Award, for Elle

== Bibliography ==
- —— (1981). The Mad River. Black Moss Press. ISBN 9780887530807.
- —— (1983). Precious. Seal Books. ISBN 9780864924148.
- —— (1985). Dog Attempts to Drown Man in Saskatoon. Talonbooks. ISBN 9780889222281.
- —— (1988). The South Will Rise at Noon. Viking. ISBN 9780864924087.
- —— (1991). A Guide to Animal Behaviour. Goose Lane. ISBN 9780864921369.
- —— (1993). The Life and Times of Captain N. Knopf. ISBN 9780864922977.
- —— (1999). Notes Home from a Prodigal Son. Oberon. ISBN 9780778011354.
- —— (2000). 16 Categories of Desire. Goose Lane. ISBN 9780864923141.
- —— (2003). Elle. Goose Lane. ISBN 9780864924926.
- —— (2003). Bad News of the Heart. Dalkey Archive. ISBN 9781564782861.
- —— (2005). The Enamoured Knight. Dalkey Archive. ISBN 9781564784049.
- —— (2012). Attack of the Copula Spiders. Biblioasis. ISBN 9781926845463.
- —— (2013). Savage Love. Goose Lane. ISBN 9780864929013.
- —— (2019). The Erotics of Restraint: Essays on Literary Form. Biblioasis. ISBN 9781771962919.
