= Clara Callan =

2001 novel by Richard B. Wright

- Clara Callan book cover
- Author: Richard B. Wright
- Language: English
- Publisher: HarperCollins
- Publication date: September 2001
- Publication place: Canada
- Media type: Print
- Pages: 448
- ISBN: 978-1554684809

Clara Callan is a novel by Canadian writer Richard B. Wright, published in 2001. It is the story of a woman in her thirties living in Ontario during the 1930s and is written in epistolary form, utilizing letters and journal entries to tell the story. The protagonist, Clara, faces the struggles of being a single woman in a rural community in the early 20th century. The novel won the Governor General's Award in the English fiction category, the Scotiabank Giller Prize, and the Trillium Book Award.

== Plot ==
Clara and Nora Callan are sisters, roughly thirty years old. Clara lives in her family home in the rural community of Whitfield, near Toronto, Ontario, after her father's death, while Nora moves to New York to pursue a glamorous career in radio soap operas. Their mother died from a possible suicide when Clara, the eldest, was seven. Their mother had been known to wander off frequently to the grave of her first-born child, so Clara cannot completely dismiss the death as accidental. Her father was a principal in a local school and raises the two daughters alone.

Clara now lives the simple life of a school teacher, she plays piano and composes poems, although she generally burns the latter after writing them. She is an independent woman who finds it difficult to live freely in a traditional rural community, especially as she realizes she has lost all faith in God. She writes letters to her sister and Nora's lesbian writer friend Evelyn Dowling and also maintains a journal. She is averse to the technological advances of the time, refusing to get a telephone for years and only accepting a radio from her sister as it was a Christmas present.

Nora's letters start narrating how the glamorous life of the big city is fake and the events in Clara's life break her solitude. Nora's popularity on the radio grows with Evelyn's help. One fateful day in 1935, when Clara goes out in the evening for a stroll, she is raped by two vagabond travelers. Discovering that she is pregnant, Clara reaches out to her sister in New York, gets an abortion, and returns to her life, hoping it to be peaceful again.

Global politics begin affecting their lives when Europe approaches World War II. Nora convinces Clara to come with her and her latest beau to Italy for a month, and they witness firsthand the growing military presence of Mussolini's regime.

In 1937 Clara meets a man named Frank in a movie theater and soon falls in love with him. She finds out early on he is in an unhappy marriage and continues to see him, even after one of his children warns Clara that there are other women. They break up when Clara asks Frank to commit to one woman, but reunite briefly a few months later. Evelyn moves to California to write for Hollywood.

Clara is contacted by one of Frank's other women and finally cuts ties with him. Unfortunately Clara finds out she is pregnant again but decides to have the child, as arranging another abortion without Evelyn's help would be far too risky. Clara ponders her past and looks for future options. Nora remains supportive and helps when she can.

The epilogue is written by her daughter Elizabeth, outlining Clara's expulsion from teaching, and search for work while raising a child alone.

== Publishing and development ==
Clara Callan is Wright's ninth novel. The novel begins in 1934 and ends in 1939. It includes themes of economics in the depression-era, sexual politics, greedy male sexuality, and the advent and influence of radio and movies in North America. The letters written by Clara have a formal tone whereas those written by Nora include colloquialisms. The novel was published by HarperCollins in September 2001 and reported to have sold approximately 200,000 copies. It was edited by Phylis Bruce, and Wright took nearly five years to complete the novel, and in his memoir A Life with Words: A Writer's Memoir calls it as "the most difficult to write".

== Reception and review ==
Quill & Quire calls the book a page-turner and "[a] lovely mix of highbrow literature and lowbrow melodrama." Carol Birch writing for The Guardian notes the able mix of contrast in the novel as "a sense of the turbulence beneath the surface calm of small lives in small towns underpins this beautiful and subtle book." Kirkus Reviews in their starred review of the novel noted it to be based similarly to Arnold Bennett's classic 1908 novel, The Old Wives' Tale. Online magazine BookBrowse calls it "a mesmerizing tribute to friendship and sisterhood, romance and redemption."

== Awards ==
The novel was presented with the 2001 Governor General's Awards for English-language fiction having been shortlisted along with Life of Pi (by Yann Martel), Dragons Cry (by Tessa McWatt), The Stone Carvers (by Jane Urquhart), and Salamander (by Thomas Wharton). The book also won the Scotiabank Giller Prize where it was shortlisted along with, The Russlander (by Sandra Birdsell), River Thieves (by Michael Crummey), Martin Sloane (by Michael Redhill), Stanley Park (by Timothy Taylor), and again The Stone Carvers (by Jane Urquhart). The award was judged by novelist David Adams Richards, author Joan Clark, and journalist Robert Fulford. It also won the Trillium Book Award and became the first book to have won all the three awards. Wright had earlier received nominations for both the Giller Prize and the Governor General's Award in 1995 for his novel The Age of Longing. Wright was awarded Author of the Year, and the novel was awarded Fiction Book of the Year at the Canadian Booksellers Association Libris Awards in 2002.
