= You've Changed =

You've Changed may refer to:

- "You've Changed" (1941 song), a song by Bill Carey and Carl Fischer
- You've Changed Records, a Canadian independent record label
- You've Changed (album), a 1992 album by jazz saxophonist Jimmy Heath
- "You've Changed" (Sia song), 2010
- "You've Changed", a 2005 song by Keyshia Cole from the album The Way It Is
- You've Changed (book), a 2025 book by Ian Williams

== See also ==
- "You Changed", a song from the Kelly Rowland album Talk a Good Game
- "You Changed Me", a 2015 song by Jamie Foxx featuring Chris Brown
