= Good People =

Good People may refer to:

- Good People (novel), a 2026 book by Patmeena Sabit
- Good People (2014 film), an American film
- Good People (2026 film), an upcoming Macedonian documentary film
- Good People (play), a 2011 play by David Lindsay-Abaire
- "Good People" (song), a 2005 song by Jack Johnson
- Good People (Canadian TV series), a 2020 Canadian TV documentary series
- Good People (Belgian TV series) or Des gens bien, a 2022 TV crime drama series
- Good People, a 2023 album by Majid Jordan
- "Good People", a 1995 song by Audio Adrenaline from Bloom
- "Good People", a 2005 song by Jeff Bates from Leave the Light On
- "Good People", a 2021 song by Bliss n Eso featuring Kasey Chambers
- A euphemistic name for fairies

== See also ==
- The Good People, a 2016 novel by Hannah Kent
