= This Cake Is for the Party =

2010 short story collection by Sarah Selecky

- First edition
- Author: Sarah Selecky
- Language: English
- Published: Thomas Allen & Son, 2010
- Publication place: Canada
- Pages: 224
- ISBN: 978-0887625251

This Cake Is for the Party is a collection of short stories by Canadian author Sarah Selecky published by Thomas Allen & Son Limited. It was shortlisted for the 2010 Scotiabank Giller Prize.

== Short stories ==
- "Throwing Cotton” - A woman reuniting with her friends from university suspects her husband is cheating on her.
- "Watching Atlas” - A man and his partner fight over her best friend who is an alcoholic.
- "How Healthy Are You?” - A woman has a chance meeting with another woman she met during a clinical drug trial in Ottawa during her student days.
- "Go-Manchura” - A woman tries to involve her friends in a pyramid scheme.
- "Standing up for Janey” - After her own relationship dissolves, a woman holds an engagement party for her best friend.
- "Where Are You Coming From, Sweetheart?” - A young girl from Sudbury living under the strict rule of her father visits her aunt and cousin in Toronto.
- “Prognosis” - A woman confesses a set of religious miracles to her mother-in-law.
- "Paul Farenbacher's Yard Sale” - A woman helps her neighbours sell off the possessions of the now deceased patriarch of the family.
- "This is How We Grow as Humans” - Two former friends confront each other over lunch after one of them has an affair with the other’s boyfriend.
- "One Thousand Wax Buddhas” - A candlemaker struggles with his wife’s mental illness.

== Awards and nominations ==
"Throwing Cotton" was nominated for the Journey Prize in 2006.

This Cake Is for the Party was shortlisted for the 2010 Scotiabank Giller Prize, but lost to The Sentimentalists.
