= Michelle Winters =

Canadian writer, translator and artist

- Born: 1972 (age 53–54); Saint John, New Brunswick, Canada
- Occupations: Novelist, playwright, translator
- Writing career
- Genres: novels, plays

Michelle Winters is a Canadian writer, translator and artist.

Winters was born in 1972 in Saint John, New Brunswick. As a founding member of Just in a Bowl Productions, she has co-written and performed in Unsinkable (2000) and The Hungarian Suicide Duel (2002). Her short stories have appeared in This Magazine, Taddle Creek, Dragnet and Matrix, and made her a nominee for the 2011 Journey Prize for short fiction. In 2017, she received a shortlisted Scotiabank Giller Prize nomination for her debut novel I Am a Truck.

She currently lives in Toronto, Ontario.

== Publications ==
- "Toupée", in: Journey: Celebrating the Journey Prize: Selected Stories 1989-2023, McClelland & Stewart, Toronto 2018, ISBN 978-0-7710-0743-9
- Hair for Men (novel), House of Anansi Press, Toronto 2024 ISBN 978-1-4870-1191-8
- I Am a Truck (novel), Invisible Publishing, Picton 2016 ISBN 978-1-9267-4378-3
- "The Canadian Grotesque", in: Taddle Creek, No. 30 (Summer 2013).
- "Maintenance to six", in: Dragnet Magazine, No. 8 (2013).
- "Toupée", in: Sharon Bala et al. (ed.), The Journey Prize Stories 30: The Best of Canada's New Writers, McClelland & Stewart, Toronto 2018, ISBN 978-0-7710-5075-6

== Translations ==
- Marie-Hélène Larochelle, Kiss the Undertow (Kiss the Undertow), House of Anansi Press, Toronto 2024 ISBN 978-1-4870-1210-6
- Marie-Hélène Larochelle, Daniil and Vanya (Daniil et Vanya), Invisible Publishing, Picton 2020 ISBN 978-1-9887-8457-1
- Marie-Ève Comtois, My Planet of Kites (Je Te Trouve Belle Mon Homme), transl. with Stuart Ross, Mansfield Press, Toronto 2014, ISBN 978-1-7712-6061-9

== Theatrical works ==
- The Hungarian Suicide Duel with Lori Delorme, Just in a Bowl Productions 2002.
- Unsinkable with Lori Delorme, Just in a Bowl Productions 2000.
