= Jennifer LoveGrove =

Canadian writer

- Occupations: novelist, poet
- Writing career
- Period: 2000s-present
- Notable work: Watch How We Walk

Jennifer LoveGrove is a Canadian writer, whose debut novel Watch How We Walk was a longlisted nominee for the Scotiabank Giller Prize in 2014.

She has also published the poetry collections The Dagger Between Her Teeth (2002), I Should Never Have Fired the Sentinel (2005), and beautiful children with pet foxes (2017), and has published work in This Magazine, Taddle Creek, Quill & Quire, The Puritan, Now, subTerrain, The Fiddlehead, Canadian Woman Studies and the National Post.

Originally from Dunnville, Ontario, she studied creative writing at York University. She currently resides in Toronto.
