= Johanna Skibsrud =

Canadian writer (born 1980)

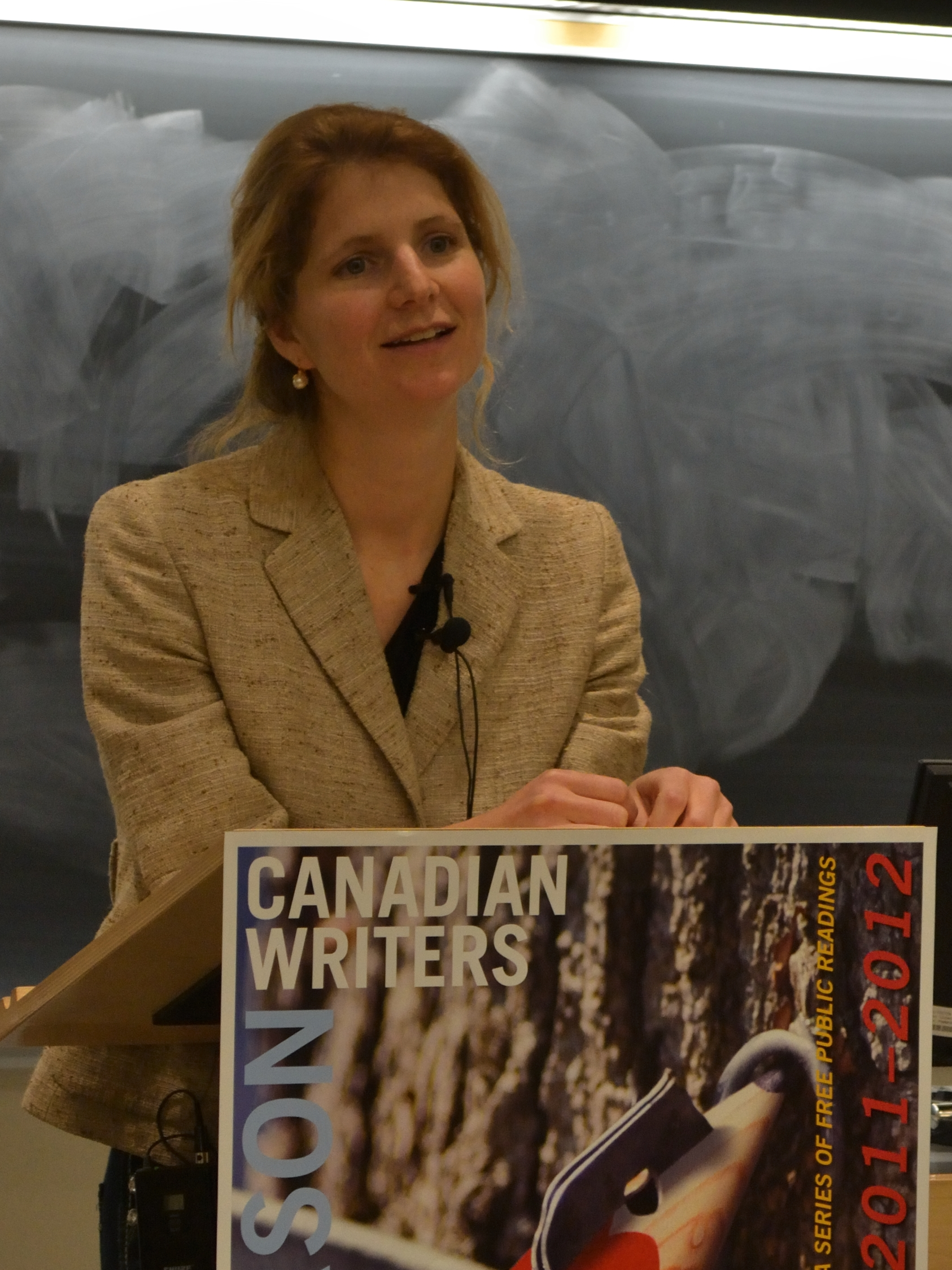
- Born: 1980 (age 45–46); Meadowville, Nova Scotia
- Occupations: novelist, poet
- Writing career
- Language: English
- Notable work: The Sentimentalists
- Notable awards: Scotiabank Giller Prize; 2010 The Sentimentalists

Johanna Shively Skibsrud (born 1980) is a Canadian writer, whose debut novel The Sentimentalists won the 2010 Scotiabank Giller Prize.

== Career ==
Skibsrud has published two books of poetry, Late Nights with Wild Cowboys in 2008 and I Do Not Think That I Could Love a Human Being in 2010. Late Nights with Wild Cowboys was a shortlisted nominee for the Gerald Lampert Award, and I Do Not Think That I Could Love a Human Being was a shortlisted nominee for the Atlantic Poetry Prize.

=== The Sentimentalists ===
In 2009, Skibsrud's debut novel The Sentimentalists was published by Gaspereau Press. The novel won the 2010 Scotiabank Giller Prize.

Skibsrud's Giller win also focused attention on the struggles of small press publishers. The book had been originally published by Gaspereau Press, a boutique firm based in Nova Scotia which is one of Canada's only book publishing companies that still binds and prints its own books, with the result that the firm had difficulty meeting the increased demand after Skibsrud's win was announced. Chapters-Indigo, Canada's primary bookstore chain, did not have a single copy of the book in stock anywhere in Canada in the entire week of the Giller announcement. However, the paper book's unavailability resulted in a significant increase in ebook sales; the ebook version of the novel quickly became the top-selling title in the Kobo ebookstore. The company subsequently announced that it had sold the novel's trade paperback rights to Douglas & McIntyre, while it will continue to print a smaller run of the novel's original edition for book collectors.

In the spring of 2011, The Sentimentalists was published in the United States by W. W. Norton & Company. The book has been translated, or is currently being translated, into five languages.

Skibsrud's first collection of short stories, This Will Be Difficult to Explain, and Other Stories, was first published in September 2011 by Hamish Hamilton Canada, with US and UK editions of the book appearing in spring 2012.

=== Quartet for the End of Time ===
In 2014, Skibsrud's second novel, Quartet for the End of Time, was published by Hamish Hamilton.

== Education ==
Skibsrud is a 2005 Master of Arts graduate from Concordia University's creative writing program; A version of The Sentimentalists was first written for her thesis. She completed her Ph.D. in English Literature at the Université de Montréal in spring 2012 and currently holds a SSHRC postdoctoral fellowship at the University of Arizona.

== Personal life ==
A native of Meadowville, Nova Scotia, Skibsrud currently lives in Tucson, Arizona.

Skibsrud is married to John Melillo, a professor at the University of Arizona.

== Bibliography ==
=== Fiction ===
- The Sentimentalists (2009)
- This Will Be Difficult to Explain, and Other Stories (2011)
- Quartet for the End of Time (2014)
- Tiger Tiger. (2018)
  - excerpt: The rememberer. Granta, 141, special ed. Canada, september 2017, pp 45–54

=== Poetry ===
- Late Nights with Wild Cowboys (2008)
- I Do Not Think That I Could Love a Human Being (2010)
