= Bellevue Square (novel) =

2017 novel by Michael Redhill

- Author: Michael Redhill
- Language: English
- Genre: Fiction, Thriller
- Publication date: September 19, 2017
- Publication place: Canada
- Pages: 272
- ISBN: 978-0-38568-483-5

Bellevue Square is a Canadian novel by Michael Redhill, published by Doubleday Canada in 2017.

== Plot ==
The novel centers on Jean Mason, a bookstore owner in Toronto, Ontario's Kensington Market neighbourhood who learns that she has an apparent doppelgänger named Ingrid Fox in the market's park, Bellevue Square, and becomes obsessed with finding the woman. The two people who have told about her double are soon dead, and Jean decides to camp out in the market to facilitate her search. Her behaviour becomes more and more bizarre.

== Critical reception ==
The novel won the CA$100,000 Scotiabank Giller Prize in 2017. The book was described by the jury members as having "complex literary wonders".
