= The Age of Longing =

1995 novel by Richard B. Wright

The Age Of Longing
- Author: Richard B. Wright
- Language: English
- Publisher: HarperCollins
- Publication date: 1995
- Publication place: Canada
- Media type: Print
- Pages: 242
- ISBN: 978-0-00-224408-4

The Age of Longing is a 1995 novel by Canadian author Richard B. Wright and published by HarperCollins. The novel was nominated for the 1995 Scotiabank Giller Prize and Governor General's Award in the English-language fiction category.

== Plot ==
Howard Wheeler returns to his home in Northern Ontario where his family lived. Upon his mother's death, he comes back to sell off the property and reminisces about his childhood memories. His father Ross 'Buddy' Wheeler is an unsuccessful hockey player and his mother Grace Wheeler is a schoolteacher. Grace is a stern, taciturn woman who considered her decision to marry Ross as her biggest mistake. She had assumed that Ross's fascination with hockey would end after marrying and assuming responsibilities. Their married life is on rocks. Howard lives a life in-between his two parents, but is always Mama's boy. After the couple separates, Howard lives with Grace. Years later, when Howard accidentally meets his father, he regrets not having been in contact with him for these many years. The two meet in an unceremonial and awkward way, pondering their past and the mistakes which they could have remedied.

== Publication and development ==
The book was the first of Wright's books to be published by HarperCollins, and his eighth novel overall. It was edited by Phyllis Bruce who later went on to work with Wright on various other projects. In a 2004 interview with the magazine Quill & Quire, Wright called The Age of Longing his "favourite among his novels".

== Reception and review ==
Wright met success only after the publication of this novel in 1995. The novel was short-listed for the 1995 Scotiabank Giller Prize along with A Fine Balance (by Rohinton Mistry), The Piano Man's Daughter (by Timothy Findley), Mister Sandman (by Barbara Gowdy), and Like This (by Leo McKay). Judged by writer Mordecai Richler, critic David Staines, and novelist Jane Urquhart, the award was eventually presented to Mistry. Wright was also nominated for the Governor General's Award for the English-language fiction category which was ultimately presented to Greg Hollingshead for The Roaring Girl. Wright won both the Giller Prize and the Governor General's Award in 2001 for his novel Clara Callan. Herman Goodden of The London Yodeller mentions that "If you've only got time to read one of his books, make it this one".
