= An Ocean of Minutes =

2018 novel by Thea Lim

First edition (publ. Viking Press)

An Ocean of Minutes is a 2018 Canadian novel by Thea Lim.

Set in an alternate timeline of 1981 where the world has been overtaken by a viral flu pandemic and time travel was made possible shortly thereafter, the novel follows a young American couple, Polly and Frank, who are forced to separate when one is infected with the flu and the other travels into the future.

The novel was nominated for the 2018 Giller Prize.

== Summary ==
In 1981, Polly Nader and her boyfriend Frank Marino were on vacation when a devastating flu pandemic was grinding the world to a halt. Shortly after, it was revealed that time travel was possible. Initially created in an attempt to stop the pandemic, the time travel falls short of reaching patient zero by a matter of months. The system becomes managed by TimeRaiser, a company which sends people from 1981 into the future but severely limits people's ability to travel to the past. When Polly learns that Frank is sick and they cannot afford medication, she decides to apply for a visa to work for TimeRaiser so that he can have insurance and access to medication. They plan to meet in 1993, but when Polly wakes up, she discovers she has been rerouted to 1998.

In 1998, Polly discovered that shortly after she travelled into the future, scientists sent vaccines to cure the flu to 1981. This resulted in the flu morphing into something more viral and deadly. In the ensuing pandemic, the states split with the Northern ones enforcing a strict quarantine on the South. After the government fell, the country decided to permanently separate, with the Northern ones retaining the name the United States of America while the Southern ones reformed into America. Polly is now a Journeyman, or a conditional citizen of America sent from the past to the future, and is trapped in Galveston.

Polly works as a furniture restorer under the instruction of the alcoholic Henry Baird, who is struggling since he was left with a similar choice as Polly but instead chose to let his long-term boyfriend die. During their time together, Polly tries to befriend him for information, eventually agreeing to steal a package containing his boyfriend's high school yearbook, valuable to TimeRaiser because his boyfriend went to school with Elvis Presley, in exchange for Baird going to Polly's meet up point with Frank. The meet-up is unsuccessful, and Baird eventually sets Polly up to take the fall for the theft on her own. Her visa status is then downgraded, adding more time to her bond.

At Polly's new job, she has no privacy but can make friends by sharing what little information she has. Her friends offer to let her live with them in an illegal encampment where workers squat in dilapidated houses. While Polly initially accepts the offer, she is offered a different opportunity from Noberto, the American landlord who was friendly to her at her previous job. He offers to marry and let her stay in his accommodations, pretending they are trying for a child. In exchange, he will help her find Frank. After he provides information that Frank searched for Polly thrice in 1993, 1995, and 1997, Polly accepts Noberto's offer.

Polly and Noberto achieve peace together, but after a while, Noberto reveals that the fixer who was supposed to help him with the evidence of his marriage absconded with the paperwork. Noberto then attempts to rape Polly, hoping to impregnate her, but she can fend him off by hitting him over the head with a lamp. Believing she has killed him, Polly is wracked with guilt, but eventually, she learns Noberto is alive when she discovers that, using funds from the sale of his house, he has paid her way out of bondage and bought her a ticket to the U.S. to atone for his attempted rape.

After making the voyage out of America, Polly is shocked to learn that, unlike America, the U.S. has a thriving, self-sufficient economy. Using the address Noberto gave her, she finally meets Frank but learns almost immediately that he did not wait for her and has a 14-year-old daughter. To Polly's relief, her aunt Donna is still alive and well-looked after, thanks to Frank, who has become rich from his ex-wife's money. Polly lives with Donna, grieving the loss of her life.

On January 1, 2000, early in the morning, Polly goes to walk Donna's dog and runs into Frank, who admits he has been avoiding her out of guilt and shame. He reveals that he connected with his daughter's mother less than two years after Polly left and that while he attempted to search for Polly, his searches stopped due to the divorce proceedings with his ex-wife. The two get a hotel room, but Polly finds she cannot be sexually intimate with Frank and accepts that he is too different from the Frank of 1981. The two part on amicable terms.

== Reception ==
The novel received positive to mixed reviews. The Toronto Star called the novel "a devastating debut," it received a starred review from Publishers Weekly and was featured as a pick of the week. Kirkus Reviews called the novel "beautiful." Quill & Quire described the main characters as "difficult to root for." The Irish Times took note of the novel's "fresh perspective on the complexity of migration and displacement" but complained that aspects of the novel felt rushed, yet praised Lim's "ability to create a vibrant world."

Maclean's highlighted the novel as one of their 15 novels of the summer and called it "an ambitious novel." The Globe & Mail listed the novel in their top 100 books of 2018.

== Awards ==
The novel was shortlisted for the 2018 Giller Prize and the ALA Reading List for Science Fiction. It was longlisted as one of the books featured in the 2019 Canada Reads program and was also longlisted for the 2019 Sunburst Award in the category of Adult Fiction.
