= Reproduction (novel) =

2019 novel by Ian Williams

- First edition
- Author: Ian Williams
- Language: English
- Publisher: Penguin Random House Canada
- Publication date: January 22, 2019
- Publication place: Canada
- Media type: Print (Hardcover, Paperback)

Reproduction is the debut novel by Canadian writer Ian Williams, published in 2019 by Penguin Random House Canada. The novel centres on the unconventional family life of Army, a biracial man from Brampton, Ontario, from the time of his conception as the child of a brief affair between a white father and a Black Canadian mother who met in a hospital room while tending to their own dying parents, through to his adulthood when his parents are themselves dying.

The novel won the 2019 Giller Prize. It was also shortlisted for the 2019 Amazon.ca First Novel Award, and the 2019 Toronto Book Awards.
