= Dionne Irving =

Canadian writer

Dionne Irving is a Canadian writer, whose short story collection The Islands was shortlisted for the 2023 Giller Prize.

Originally from Toronto, Ontario, she currently teaches in the creative writing and Initiative on Race and Resilience programs at the University of Notre Dame.

She published her debut novel Quint in 2021 which was followed by The Islands in 2023. The Islands was also shortlisted for the PEN/Faulkner Award.

== Biography ==
Dionne Irving grew up in Toronto, Ontario, Canada, where her parents ran a Caribbean grocery store. She earned her Ph.D. in creative writing from Georgia State University.
