= Menaka Raman-Wilms =

Canadian writer

Menaka Raman-Wilms is a Canadian writer, whose debut novel The Rooftop Garden was longlisted for the 2023 Giller Prize.

She is a journalist for The Globe and Mail, for whom she currently hosts the daily news podcast The Decibel.
