= Deepa Rajagopalan =

Canadian writer

Deepa Rajagopalan is a Canadian writer, whose short story collection Peacocks of Instagram was shortlisted for the 2024 Giller Prize.

Born to Indian parents in Saudi Arabia, she has lived in India, the United States and Canada. An MFA graduate of the University of Guelph, she won the PEN Canada New Voices Award in 2021 for the title story "Peacocks of Instagram".
