= The Cure for Death by Lightning =

1995 novel by Gail Anderson-Dargatz

- First edition (Canadian)
- Author: Gail Anderson-Dargatz
- Language: English language
- Publisher: Knopf Canada
- Publication date: 1996
- Publication place: Canada
- Media type: Print
- Pages: 294
- ISBN: 0-394-28157-8

The Cure for Death by Lightning is the debut novel from Canadian author Gail Anderson-Dargatz. It was nominated for the Giller Prize, was awarded the Ethel Wilson Fiction Prize, and became a bestseller in Canada (selling over 100,000 copies) and Great Britain (where it won a Betty Trask Award).

== Plot introduction ==
Set in an isolated farming community in Shuswap Country, British Columbia at the end of the Second World War it is a coming of age story containing elements of magic realism. Fifteen-year-old Beth Weeks has to contend with her family's struggle against poverty but also her increasingly paranoid and aggressive father whose behaviour leaves the family as outcasts in the community. A number of unusual characters appear in the book, including Filthy Billy, a hired hand with tourettes and Nora, a sensual half-Native girl whose mother has an extra little finger and a man's voice.

The title of the book comes from one of a number of household tips and recipes belonging to her mother which appear as asides throughout the book, while Beth's mother withdraws from reality and talks with her dead mother; leaving Beth to be sexually molested by her father.

== Reception ==
- The Boston Sunday Globe described how, "some first novelists tiptoe. Not Gail Anderson-Dargatz. She makes her debut in full stride, confidently breaking the rules to create a fictional style we might call Pacific Northwest Gothic."
- Canadian Literature quarterly criticizes the "somewhat ponderous plot" but praises the "acuteness of vision" and "sharp rendition of the breathless, sensate moment" as the "magic in the ordinary" is revealed.
