= Disorientation (book) =

2021 collection of essays by Ian Williams

Disorientation: Being Black in the World
- Cover
- Author: Ian Williams
- Genre: Non-fiction
- Publisher: Europa Compass
- Publication date: November 30, 2021
- Pages: 224
- ISBN: 978-1-60945-739-6

Disorientation: Being Black in the World is a collection of essays on racial politics by Canadian writer Ian Williams. Published in 2021, it is Williams' first essay collection. Williams wrote the book while living in Vancouver during the COVID-19 pandemic. He was inspired by racial injustice and the George Floyd protests.

== Reception ==
Kirkus Reviews praised it as "A lyrical, closely observed contribution to the literature of race and social justice." David Collings of The Ubyssey wrote that it "invites its reader into Williams’ thoughts on race, Blackness and place through accessible essays and personal accounts."

Kelly Justice of the Southern Booksellers Review called it "illuminating, dizzying, and intensely personal. I can’t recommend it highly enough."

The book was shortlisted for the Hubert Evans Non-Fiction Prize.
