= Quartet for the End of Time (novel) =

2014 novel by Johanna Skibsrud

- The first edition cover
- Author: Johanna Skibsrud
- Language: English
- Published: 2014
- Publisher: W. W. Norton & Company
- ISBN: 978-0-393-07373-7

Quartet for the End of Time is a 2014 novel by Giller Prize–winning author Johanna Skibsrud. The novel takes its name and structure from Quatuor pour la fin du temps, a piece of chamber music by the French composer Olivier Messiaen.

== Structure ==
Like the musical piece it takes its name from, the novel is divided into seven sections and an interlude with each section told from the point of view of Sutton, Douglas, or Alden.

== Plot ==
Sutton Kelly, a judge's daughter, is coerced into covering for her brother Alden by their father after Alden becomes involved in a communist plot to blow up the National Mall.

== Reception ==
The novel received mixed reviews with the Toronto Star calling it a "distracted, meandering, at times opaque novel" and criticizing Skibsrud for being "prone to amateur mistakes." In the New York Times Skibsrud's technique was criticized as feeling "artificial, as if the emotional consequences of her characters’ actions are being thrown out willy-nilly to see which ones stick." However a critic at The Globe and Mail praised the novel calling it a "strange, deeply compassionate, and beautiful work."
