= Kevin Chong =

Canadian author

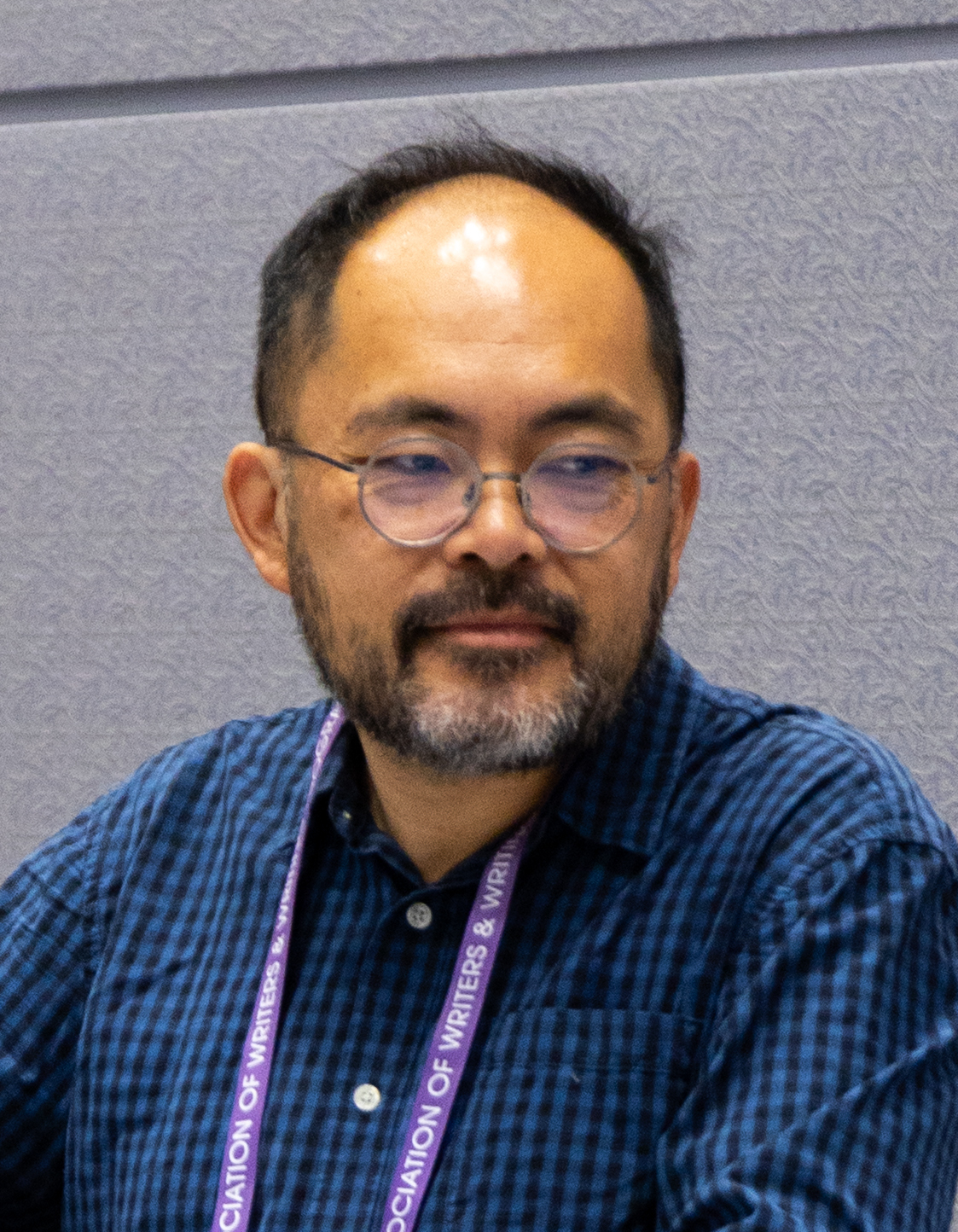
- Chong at AWP 2025
- Born: 1975 (age 50–51)
- Education: University of British Columbia (BA); Columbia University (MFA)
- Occupation: Writer

Kevin Chong (born 1975) is a Canadian author. Born in Hong Kong, Chong studied at the University of British Columbia and Columbia University, where he received an MFA in fiction writing.

His first novel, Baroque-a-Nova, was published in Canada by Penguin in 2001, in the United States by Putnam in 2002, and in France by Ballard in 2002. The New York Times Book Review describes the book as "a readable, if slightly gray, coming-of-age novel." The Quill and Quire described the book as "compact, clear-sighted, and nervy. Chong's grasp of suburban tackiness is laugh-out-loud awesome, right down to the ubiquitous copies of Maclean's magazine on parental coffee tables and trick or treaters dressed as Orville Redenbacher."

His second book Neil Young Nation (2005), a non-fiction work, traces the steps of Neil Young's 1970 trip across Canada and the United States. New York Times Book Review of compared the book to "watching an endless home movie in which a not very close friend visits all the houses he grew up in." The Georgia Straight suggested that "Still looking for happiness, community, and fulfillment, Chong is a genuine seeker-and his journey is a ride worth taking."

Chong works extensively as a freelance journalist. His creative nonfiction and journalism have appeared in the Guardian, the Times Literary Supplement, the Rumpus, and the South China Morning Post.

His 2023 novel The Double Life of Benson Yu was shortlisted for the Giller Prize.

Chong lives in Vancouver, British Columbia.

== Bibliography ==
=== Novels ===
- Baroque-a-Nova, 2001
- Beauty Plus Pity, 2011
- The Plague, 2018
- The Double Life of Benson Yu, 2023

=== Non-fiction ===
- Neil Young Nation: a quest, an obsession, and a true story, 2005
- My Year of The Race Horse, 2012
- Northern Dancer: The Legendary Horse that Inspired a Nation, 2014
