= John Gould (Canadian writer) =

Canadian writer

John Gould is a Canadian short story writer from Victoria, British Columbia. He is most noted for his 2003 book Kilter: 55 Fictions, published by Turnstone Press, which was shortlisted for the Giller Prize.

Gould's first book, The Kingdom of Heaven: 88 Palm-of-the-Hand Stories, was published in 1996.

CBC Books listed Gould's 2020 collection of short stories, The End of Me, on its list of Canadian fiction to watch for in spring 2020. The book was shortlisted for the 2021 ReLit Award for short fiction.

Gould currently teaches creative writing at the University of Victoria. He is also a member of the fiction editorial board at The Malahat Review.

He is the nephew of journalist Robert Fulford.
