= Jack Rabinovitch =

Canadian philanthropist

Jack Rabinovitch OC, O.Ont
- Born: June 24, 1930; Montreal, Quebec, Canada
- Died: August 6, 2017 (aged 87); Sunnybrook Hospital, Toronto, Ontario, Canada
- Education: Baron Byng High School; McGill University
- Spouse: Doris Giller (d. 1993)
- Parents: Issac Rabinovitch (father); Fanny Shulman (mother)

Jack Rabinovitch (24 June 1930 – 6 August 2017) OC, O.Ont was a Canadian philanthropist best known for founding the Giller Prize which is named after his late wife, Doris Giller, who was a literary columnist for the Toronto Star.

== Life and career ==
Rabinovitch was born and raised in Montreal to Isaac Rabinovitch and Fanny Shulman, then graduated from McGill University with a BA in English.

Rabinovitch was a reporter and speechwriter who later turned to business (working for Sam Steinberg of food retailer Steinbergs) and made his fortune in food retailing and real estate. He joined real estate developer Trizec Corporation in the 1970s and was an executive who helped develop six million square feet of hotel, commercial and retail space.

He was Maclean's magazine's man of the year in 1999 and was a recipient of the Order of Canada and the Order of Ontario.

== Personal life ==
Rabinovitch and Giller moved to Toronto in 1985, where he remained until his death.

== Death and legacy ==
Rabinovitch died on 6 August 2017, aged 87. He was laid to rest at Beth Tzedec Memorial Park.

After his death, the Toronto Public Library opened the Jack Rabinovitch Reading Room inside the Toronto Reference Library in downtown Toronto in 2019. Rabinovitch's book collection and his other memorabilia are on display there, and events leading to the Giller Prize are being held here.
