= Gaspereau Press =

Canadian publishing company

- Industry: Publishing
- Founded: 1997; 29 years ago
- Founders: Andrew Steeves; Gary Dunfield
- Headquarters: Canada
- Owner: Keagan Hawthorne (acquisition pending)
- Website: www.gaspereau.com

Gaspereau Press is a Canadian publishing company founded in Nova Scotia in 1997 by Andrew Steeves and Gary Dunfield. In 2025, it was announced that Keagan Hawthorne would acquire the company and transfer its operations to Sackville, New Brunswick.

Its philosophy emphasizes "making books that reinstate the importance of the book as a physical object", prioritizing the design and the manufacturing quality of its titles. The firm attracted attention in 2010 when one of its titles, Johanna Skibsrud's novel The Sentimentalists, won the Scotiabank Giller Prize.

Rejected by several major publishers before Gaspereau, the book had originally been released in a limited run of just 800 copies. However, the award win pushed demand for the book well beyond the 1,000 copies per week that the company's printing press could produce at maximum capacity, resulting in the book being unavailable in stores for almost two weeks after the Giller announcement.

Meanwhile, Gaspereau Press announced that it had sold the novel's trade paperback rights to Douglas & McIntyre, while it will continue to print a smaller run of the novel's original edition for book collectors.

== See also ==
- Literature of Nova Scotia
