= Joanna Cockerline =

Canadian writer

Joanna Cockerline is a Canadian writer, originally from Guelph, Ontario, and currently based in Kelowna, British Columbia. Her debut novel, Still, was longlisted for the 2025 Giller Prize.

A graduate of the University of Guelph, she is a lecturer in creative writing and management communications at UBC Okanagan, and also runs a street outreach program for the homeless.
