= C. S. Richardson =

Canadian novelist, and book designer (born 1955)

Charles Scott Richardson
- Born: 1955 (age 70–71); Regina, Saskatchewan
- Occupations: writer, book designer
- Writing career
- Notable works: The End of the Alphabet, The Emperor of Paris, All the Colour in the World

Charles Scott Richardson (born 1955 in Regina, Saskatchewan) is a Canadian novelist and book designer, whose novel The End of the Alphabet won the 2008 Commonwealth Writers' Prize for Best First Book, Canada & the Caribbean.

Richardson's second novel, The Emperor of Paris, was longlisted for the 2012 Giller Prize. His third novel, All the Colour in the World, was shortlisted for the 2023 Giller Prize.

He is vice president and creative director at Random House of Canada. He lives in Toronto.

== Works ==
- The End of the Alphabet (2007). ISBN 9780385522557.
- The Emperor of Paris (2012). ISBN 9780385670906.
- All the Colour in the World (2023). ISBN 9781039003514.
