= Sarah Selecky =

Canadian writer (born 1974)

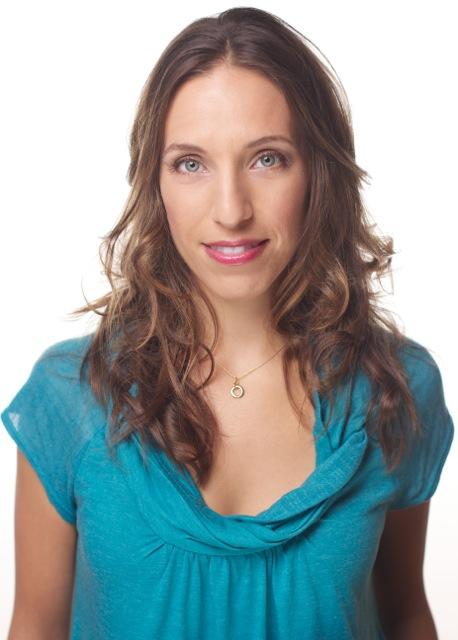
- Born: September 17, 1974 (age 51); Hanmer, Ontario, Canada
- Education: Trent University
- Occupations: Writer, entrepreneur (Story Is A State of Mind)
- Writing career
- Notable work: This Cake Is for the Party
- Website: www.sarahselecky.com

Sarah Selecky (born 17 September 1974) is a Canadian writer. Her debut short story collection This Cake Is for the Party was a shortlisted nominee for the Scotiabank Giller Prize and longlisted for the Frank O'Connor Short Story Award in 2010.

Raised in the Hanmer area of Greater Sudbury, she graduated from Trent University. She attended the University of Victoria's undergraduate writing program briefly before returning to Toronto to pursue her writing career. While living in Toronto, she completed the University of British Columbia's Optional-Residency MFA in Creative Writing. She published short stories in The Walrus, Geist, The Journey Prize Anthology, The New Quarterly and Prairie Fire before publishing This Cake Is for the Party in early 2010.

Selecky launched an online writing instruction course, Story Is a State of Mind, in 2011. She also runs an online creative writing program called Sarah Selecky Writing School. The school hosts an annual writing competition, Little Bird Writing Contest, with winners published in an anthology, Little Bird Stories, each year. Editors of the anthology have included Cherie Dimaline, Esi Edugyan, Zsuzsi Gartner and Lisa Moore.

== Books ==
- This Cake is for the Party: Stories. Thomas Allen Publishers, 2010
- Radiant Shimmering Light. HarperCollins Canada, 2018
- Story is a State of Mind: Writing and the Art of Creative Curiosity. Assembly Press, 2025
