= Kirti Bhadresa =

Canadian writer

Kirti Bhadresa is a Canadian writer from Calgary, Alberta. Her debut short story collection, An Astonishment of Stars, was a finalist for the 2025 Georges Bugnet Fiction Prize. It was longlisted for the 2025 Giller Prize. The collection won the Alberta Short Story Collection Award in 2026.
