= Richard B. Wright =

Canadian novelist (1937-2017)

Richard B. Wright CM
- Born: Richard Bruce Wright; March 4, 1937; Midland, Ontario, Canada
- Died: February 7, 2017 (aged 79); St. Catharines, Ontario, Canada
- Occupation: Writer
- Spouse: Phyllis Cotton
- Writing career
- Notable works: The Weekend Man, In the Middle of a Life, Clara Callan, & Mr.Shakespeare's Bastard

Richard Bruce Wright CM (March 4, 1937 – February 7, 2017) was a Canadian novelist. He was known for his break-through 2001 novel Clara Callan, which won three major literary awards in Canada: The Giller Prize, the Trillium Book Award, and the Governor General's Award.

== Early life and education ==
Wright was born in Midland, Ontario, to Laverne and Laura (née Thomas). Wright graduated from high school in Midland in 1956, and attended and graduated from Ryerson Polytechnic Institute in the area of radio and TV arts in 1959. He worked briefly within local newspapers and radio stations as a copywriter before becoming an assistant editor for Macmillan Canada in 1960.

== Career ==
=== Debut and success ===
Wright married Phyllis Wright (née Cotton) in 1966 and they have two sons, Christopher Stephen and Richard Andrew. During Wright's time at Macmillan, he published his first book, a children's book entitled Andrew Tolliver (later retitled One John A. Too Many). Wright's first full-length novel, The Weekend Man, was written in eighteen months while staying at his wife's family cottage in Quebec. The novel became a critical success, winning praise for Wright's versatility and ability to create believable female characters. In 1970, Wright returned to postsecondary education at Trent University, graduating in 1972 with a B.A. in English. In 1976, he obtained a position at Ridley College, a private school, where he taught English until his retirement.

=== Later career ===
Although nominated for several literary awards, Wright didn't gain recognition until 2001 when his novel Clara Callan won both the Giller Prize and Governor-General's Award. This led to the republication of many of his earlier works. This novel went on to win three of Canada's major literary awards: The Giller Prize, the Trillium Book Award, and the Governor General's Award. Wright's published works deal with the lives of ordinary people, with a profound balance of depth and sensitivity. Wright had been praised as an author who created believable characters with a voice that must be heard. The reviewer in The Montreal Gazette is just one of many who have praised Wright's work, stating that his most recent book, Mr.Shakespeare's Bastard, is "A masterful novel … [which] confirms his ability to evoke an authentically female sensibility." The novel has continued to gain recognition and was described by The Winnipeg Free Press as a novel that "Draws us swiftly through the pages..." Wright provides a narrative of pure life to his settings and character backgrounds that have continued to give him wide recognition as a Canadian novelist. His novels have been, and continue to be, published all around the world. In 2006, Wright received an Honorary Doctor of Letters from Trent University, and in 2007 he became a member of the Order of Canada.

== Later life and death ==
He lived in St. Catharines, Ontario, where he wrote full-time and enjoyed the recreational pastimes of walking, reading and music. Wright died in hospital on the morning of February 7, 2017 as a result of a stroke. He was 79.

== Awards and nominations ==
- Toronto Book Award 1973 (In the Middle of a Life)
- Faber Memorial Prize UK 1975 (In the Middle of a Life)
- Nom. Giller Prize 1995 (The Age of Longing)
- Nom. Governor General's Award 1995 (The Age of Longing)
- Governor General's Award 2001 (Clara Callan)
- Giller Prize 2001 (Clara Callan)
- Trillium Book Award 2001 (Clara Callan)
- Honorary Doctor of Letters 2006 (Trent University)
- Member of The Order Of Canada 2007

== Bibliography ==
- Andrew Tolliver (1965) – later retitled One John A. Too Many
- The Weekend Man (1970)
- In the Middle of a Life (1973)
- Farthing's Fortunes (1976)
- Final Things (1980)
- The Teacher's Daughter (1982)
- Tourists (1984)
- One John A. Too Many (1984)
- Sunset Manor (1990)
- The Age of Longing (1995)
- Clara Callan (2001)
- Adultery (2004)
- October (2007)
- Mr. Shakespeare's Bastard (2010)
- A Life With Words: A Writer's Memoir [non-fiction] (2015)
- Nightfall (2016)
