= Loghan Paylor =

Canadian writer

Loghan Paylor is a Canadian writer. Their debut novel The Cure for Drowning was longlisted for the 2024 Giller Prize, shortlisted for the 2025 Jim Deva Prize for Writing that Provokes, and won the Canada Reads 2026 competition after 4 days of "passionate and powerful debate" in which it was supported by Tegan Quin.

== Life and education ==
Paylor was born and raised in Ontario. They attended London Central Secondary School. Paylor has a master's degree in creative writing from the University of British Columbia. They live in Abbotsford, British Columbia.

== Career ==
The Cure for Drowning, a World War II-era historical novel centred on a transmasculine non-binary person who enters the Royal Canadian Air Force, was published in January 2024 by Penguin Random House Canada. It was the winner of Canada Reads 2026, represented by Tegan Quin.

Paylor has also published short fiction and essays in literary magazines such as Prairie Fire and Room.
