= Kilter: 55 Fictions =

2003 book by John Gould

- Author: John Gould
- Language: English
- Published: 2003 (Turnstone Press)
- Publication place: Canada
- Media type: Print (paperback)
- Pages: 205 pp (first edition)

Kilter: 55 Fictions is the first book by the Canadian author John Gould published in 2003 by Turnstone Press.

The short story collection contains 55 brief vignettes that explore modern life. The book was a finalist for the 2003 Giller Prize. The book was also adapted into a short film trilogy by director Corey Lee.
