= Thea Lim =

Canadian writer (born 1981)

- Born: 1981 (age 44–45); Toronto, Ontario
- Occupation: Writer
- Writing career
- Period: 2007–present
- Notable work: An Ocean of Minutes
- Website: thealim.org

Thea Lim is a Canadian writer, whose debut novel An Ocean of Minutes was named as a shortlisted finalist for the 2018 Scotiabank Giller Prize.

Born in Canada and raised mostly in Singapore, Lim has an MFA in creative writing from the University of Houston. She published the novella The Same Woman in 2007, and An Ocean of Minutes followed in 2018. She taught in the University of Toronto's Writing and Rhetoric Program, before joining the faculty of Sheridan College's Creative Writing & Publishing program.

Lim is the Edna Staebler Writer-in-Residence for 2025, at Wilfrid Laurier University.

== Bibliography ==
- The Same Woman (2007)
- An Ocean of Minutes (2018)
