= Bindu Suresh =

Canadian writer and doctor

Bindu Suresh is a Canadian writer and doctor from Montreal, Quebec.

Born in Wales, she grew up in Canada, living at various times in Saskatchewan, Alberta, Ontario and Quebec. She studied literature at Columbia University and medicine at McGill University, and worked as a journalist for newspapers including the Montreal Gazette and the Buenos Aires Herald. She currently works as a pediatrician.

Her debut novel, 26 Knots, was published in 2019. In 2021 she published the French-language translation 26 noeuds.

Her second novel, The Road Between Us, was published in 2025, and was longlisted for the 2025 Giller Prize.
