= Giller Prize =

Canadian literary award

- Awarded for: English-language Canadian fiction including translations
- Country: Canada
- Presented by: Giller Prize Foundation
- First award: November 1994; 32 years ago
- Website: gillerprize.ca

The Giller Prize (formerly known as the Scotiabank Giller Prize from 2005 to 2025) is a literary award given to a Canadian author of a novel or short story collection published in English (including translation) the previous year, after an annual juried competition between publishers who submit entries. The prize was established in 1994 by Toronto businessman Jack Rabinovitch in honour of his late wife Doris Giller, a former literary editor at the Toronto Star, and is awarded in November of each year along with a cash reward (then CAN$25,000) with the winner being presented by the previous year's winning author.

Since its inception, the Giller Prize has been awarded to emerging and established authors from both small independent and large publishing houses in Canada.

In February of 2025, the Giller Prize severed its relationship with Scotiabank, its main sponsor, after more than a year of protests.

== History ==
From 1994 to 2004, the prize included a bronze figure created by artist Yehouda Chaki. The current prize includes a trophy designed by Soheil Mosun.

On September 22, 2005, the Giller Prize established an endorsement deal with Canadian bank Scotiabank. The total prize package for the award was increased to $50,000, with $40,000 presented to the winning author and $2,500 each for the other four shortlisted nominees. The award's official name was also changed at that time to the Scotiabank Giller Prize.

In 2006, the prize instituted a longlist for the first time, comprising no fewer than 10 and no more than 15 titles. In 2008, the prize fund was increased to $50,000 for the winning author and $5,000 for each of the authors on the shortlist. In 2014, the prize package was expanded further, to $100,000 for the winning author and $10,000 for each of the shortlisted authors. If a translated work wins the award, however, then the prize money is split, with 70 per cent going to the original author and 30 per cent going to the translator.

In 2015, the jury was expanded from three to five people.

Over the years, the Giller Prize has run different promotions to extend its recognition and support of Canadian literary talent to highlight all Canadian fiction eligible for the prize in a given publishing year. For example, the Craving CanLit feature (previously called Crazy for CanLit), which highlights the initial list of all titles that are under consideration for the award's longlist and shortlist nominations, seeks to publicize Canadian literature by engaging readers and writers through social media tools. Another online initiative started in 2021, the Giller Book Club, featuring virtual author readings and interviews, got off to a bumpy start when the inaugural offering was the victim of zoombombing.

Since Rabinovitch's death in 2017, the Giller Prize Foundation has been overseen by his daughter Elana Rabinovitch.

== Cultural debate ==
Following Vincent Lam's win of the Giller Prize in 2006, Geist columnist Stephen Henighan criticized the Giller Prize for its apparent dependency for its shortlists and winners on books published by Bertelsmann AG-affiliated Canadian publishing houses, all of which are based in Toronto.

Arguing that the trend towards centralization of Canadian publishing in Toronto has led to a monopolistic control of the Giller Prize by Bertelsmann and its authors, Henighan wrote, "Year after year the vast majority of the books shortlisted for the Giller came from the triumvirate of publishers owned by the Bertelsmann Group: Knopf Canada, Doubleday Canada and Random House Canada. Like the three musketeers, this trio is in fact a quartet: Bertelsmann also owns 25 percent of McClelland & Stewart, and now manages M&S’s marketing." Henighan added that all of the Giller Prize winners from 1994 to 2004, with the exception of Mordecai Richler, lived within a two-hour drive of downtown Toronto.

The article raised debate within the media and in the wider public over the credibility of the Giller Prize. Henighan revisited that article in 2015.

In 2010, there was much talk about how small presses dominated that year’s shortlist. Montrealer Johanna Skibsrud won the Giller Prize that year for her novel The Sentimentalists, published by independent Gaspereau Press. The company produces books using a 1960s offset printing press and hand-bindery equipment. As a result, while there was great demand for the book in the marketplace, the publisher had trouble keeping up with production. In the end, they turned to Douglas & McIntyre, a large West Coast publisher, to print copies of the book.

The Gaspereau situation prompted an examination within the cultural community about what makes a book and the nature of publishing and marketing books. The book also became the top-selling title for Kobo eReaders, outselling even George W. Bush's memoir Decision Points.

In November 2023, a month after the October 7th escalation of the Gaza War, pro-Palestinian protestors interrupted the Giller ceremony to object to Scotiabank's sponsorship of the prize, given the bank's reported $500m investment in Israel-based arms manufacturer Elbit Systems. In response to their arrests, an open letter was circulated in solidarity with the protestors, which was signed by more than 2,000 people, including past winners, finalists, and jurors of the prize. By March 2024, Scotiabank had divested nearly half of its stake in Elbit Systems.

In July 2024, 19 authors presented a letter withdrawing their books from consideration for that year's prize and demanding the foundation pressure Scotiabank's full divestment from Elbit Systems, as well as ending the sponsorships by the Azrieli Foundation, Indigo, and Audible over their ties to Israel. The letter was also signed by two previous winners of the prize. Dinaw Mengestu–who was originally set to serve on the jury that year–resigned in response; the following week, the other international juror, Megha Majumdar, did as well. In the first quarter of 2024, Scotiabank further divested from Elbit Systems by more than $100-million; this makes for a total divestment over the previous year of more than three quarters of its total stake.

Covering the controversy, Marsha Lederman of The Globe and Mail noted that several other Canadian literary awards, including the Amazon.ca First Novel Award and the Carol Shields Prize for Fiction, were not being targeted despite also being sponsored by companies with financial ties to Israel, and suggested that the primary reason for focusing solely on the Giller was that founder Jack Rabinovitch had been Jewish.

The 2024 ceremony followed a different format than previous years, being taped for later rebroadcast rather than being aired live, although organizers and the CBC attributed this to increasingly common practice for awards ceremonies (such as the Canadian Screen Awards, which have also been broadcast in recent years as tape-delayed one-hour "highlights" specials rather than full live ceremonies) rather than the protests. Despite this, protestors still picketed the hotel where the ceremony was taking place.

Scotiabank's sponsorship of the prize ended in February 2025. In July 2025, the Giller Foundation announced that the award was in danger of having to shut down at the end of 2025 if other sponsorships and/or public government support could not be secured.

For 2026, the award named a jury consisting of independent booksellers rather than writers. In April 2026, the boycotting writers announced that they were ending the boycott as the Giller had terminated its relationships with all of the disputed sponsors.

== Nominees and winners ==
=== 1990s ===
Year	Jury	Author	Book	Result	Ref.
1994	Alice Munro Mordecai Richler David Staines	M. G. Vassanji	The Book of Secrets	Winner	
1994	Alice Munro Mordecai Richler David Staines	Bonnie Burnard	Casino and Other Stories	Shortlist	
1994	Alice Munro Mordecai Richler David Staines	Eliza Clark	What You Need	Shortlist	
1994	Alice Munro Mordecai Richler David Staines	Shyam Selvadurai	Funny Boy	Shortlist	
1994	Alice Munro Mordecai Richler David Staines	Steve Weiner	The Museum of Love	Shortlist	
1995	Mordecai Richler David Staines Jane Urquhart	Rohinton Mistry	A Fine Balance	Winner	
1995	Mordecai Richler David Staines Jane Urquhart	Timothy Findley	The Piano Man's Daughter	Shortlist	
1995	Mordecai Richler David Staines Jane Urquhart	Barbara Gowdy	Mister Sandman	Shortlist	
1995	Mordecai Richler David Staines Jane Urquhart	Leo McKay, Jr.	Like This	Shortlist	
1995	Mordecai Richler David Staines Jane Urquhart	Richard B. Wright	The Age of Longing	Shortlist	
1996	Bonnie Burnard Carol Shields David Staines	Margaret Atwood	Alias Grace	Winner	
1996	Bonnie Burnard Carol Shields David Staines	Gail Anderson-Dargatz	The Cure for Death by Lightning	Shortlist	
1996	Bonnie Burnard Carol Shields David Staines	Ann-Marie MacDonald	Fall on Your Knees	Shortlist	
1996	Bonnie Burnard Carol Shields David Staines	Anne Michaels	Fugitive Pieces	Shortlist	
1996	Bonnie Burnard Carol Shields David Staines	Guy Vanderhaeghe	The Englishman's Boy	Shortlist	
1997	Bonnie Burnard Mavis Gallant Peter Gzowski	Mordecai Richler	Barney's Version	Winner	
1997	Bonnie Burnard Mavis Gallant Peter Gzowski	Michael Helm	The Projectionist	Shortlist	
1997	Bonnie Burnard Mavis Gallant Peter Gzowski	Shani Mootoo	Cereus Blooms at Night	Shortlist	
1997	Bonnie Burnard Mavis Gallant Peter Gzowski	Nino Ricci	Where She Has Gone	Shortlist	
1997	Bonnie Burnard Mavis Gallant Peter Gzowski	Carol Shields	Larry's Party	Shortlist	
1998	Margaret Atwood Guy Vanderhaeghe Peter Gzowski	Alice Munro	The Love of a Good Woman	Winner	
1998	Margaret Atwood Guy Vanderhaeghe Peter Gzowski	André Alexis	Childhood	Shortlist	
1998	Margaret Atwood Guy Vanderhaeghe Peter Gzowski	Gail Anderson-Dargatz	A Recipe for Bees	Shortlist	
1998	Margaret Atwood Guy Vanderhaeghe Peter Gzowski	Barbara Gowdy	The White Bone	Shortlist	
1998	Margaret Atwood Guy Vanderhaeghe Peter Gzowski	Greg Hollingshead	The Healer	Shortlist	
1998	Margaret Atwood Guy Vanderhaeghe Peter Gzowski	Wayne Johnston	The Colony of Unrequited Dreams	Shortlist	
1999	Alberto Manguel Judith Mappin Nino Ricci	Bonnie Burnard	A Good House	Winner	
1999	Alberto Manguel Judith Mappin Nino Ricci	Timothy Findley	Pilgrim	Shortlist	
1999	Alberto Manguel Judith Mappin Nino Ricci	Anne Hébert	Am I Disturbing You?	Shortlist	
1999	Alberto Manguel Judith Mappin Nino Ricci	Nancy Huston	The Mark of the Angel	Shortlist	
1999	Alberto Manguel Judith Mappin Nino Ricci	David Macfarlane	Summer Gone	Shortlist	

=== 2000s ===
Year	Jury	Author	Book	Result	Ref.
2000	Margaret Atwood Alistair MacLeod Jane Urquhart	Michael Ondaatje	Anil's Ghost	Winner	
2000	Margaret Atwood Alistair MacLeod Jane Urquhart	David Adams Richards	Mercy Among the Children	Winner	
2000	Margaret Atwood Alistair MacLeod Jane Urquhart	Alan Cumyn	Burridge Unbound	Shortlist	
2000	Margaret Atwood Alistair MacLeod Jane Urquhart	Elizabeth Hay	A Student of Weather	Shortlist	
2000	Margaret Atwood Alistair MacLeod Jane Urquhart	Eden Robinson	Monkey Beach	Shortlist	
2000	Margaret Atwood Alistair MacLeod Jane Urquhart	Fred Stenson	The Trade	Shortlist	
2001	David Adams Richards Joan Clark Robert Fulford	Richard B. Wright	Clara Callan	Winner	
2001	David Adams Richards Joan Clark Robert Fulford	Sandra Birdsell	The Russlander	Shortlist	
2001	David Adams Richards Joan Clark Robert Fulford	Michael Crummey	River Thieves	Shortlist	
2001	David Adams Richards Joan Clark Robert Fulford	Michael Redhill	Martin Sloane	Shortlist	
2001	David Adams Richards Joan Clark Robert Fulford	Jane Urquhart	The Stone Carvers	Shortlist	
2001	David Adams Richards Joan Clark Robert Fulford	Timothy Taylor	Stanley Park	Shortlist	
2002	Barbara Gowdy Thomas King W. H. New	Austin Clarke	The Polished Hoe	Winner	
2002	Barbara Gowdy Thomas King W. H. New	Bill Gaston	Mount Appetite	Shortlist	
2002	Barbara Gowdy Thomas King W. H. New	Wayne Johnston	The Navigator of New York	Shortlist	
2002	Barbara Gowdy Thomas King W. H. New	Lisa Moore	Open	Shortlist	
2002	Barbara Gowdy Thomas King W. H. New	Carol Shields	Unless	Shortlist	
2003	Rosalie Abella David Staines Rudy Wiebe	M. G. Vassanji	The In-Between World of Vikram Lall	Winner	
2003	Rosalie Abella David Staines Rudy Wiebe	Margaret Atwood	Oryx and Crake	Shortlist	
2003	Rosalie Abella David Staines Rudy Wiebe	John Bemrose	The Island Walkers	Shortlist	
2003	Rosalie Abella David Staines Rudy Wiebe	John Gould	Kilter: 55 Fictions	Shortlist	
2003	Rosalie Abella David Staines Rudy Wiebe	Ann-Marie MacDonald	The Way the Crow Flies	Shortlist	
2004	Charlotte Gray Alistair MacLeod M. G. Vassanji	Alice Munro	Runaway	Winner	
2004	Charlotte Gray Alistair MacLeod M. G. Vassanji	Shauna Singh Baldwin	The Tiger Claw	Shortlist	
2004	Charlotte Gray Alistair MacLeod M. G. Vassanji	Wayson Choy	All That Matters	Shortlist	
2004	Charlotte Gray Alistair MacLeod M. G. Vassanji	Pauline Holdstock	Beyond Measure	Shortlist	
2004	Charlotte Gray Alistair MacLeod M. G. Vassanji	Miriam Toews	A Complicated Kindness	Shortlist	
2004	Charlotte Gray Alistair MacLeod M. G. Vassanji	Paul Quarrington	Galveston	Shortlist	
2005	Warren Cariou Elizabeth Hay Richard B. Wright	David Bergen	The Time in Between	Winner	
2005	Warren Cariou Elizabeth Hay Richard B. Wright	Joan Barfoot	Luck	Shortlist	
2005	Warren Cariou Elizabeth Hay Richard B. Wright	Camilla Gibb	Sweetness in the Belly	Shortlist	
2005	Warren Cariou Elizabeth Hay Richard B. Wright	Lisa Moore	Alligator	Shortlist	
2005	Warren Cariou Elizabeth Hay Richard B. Wright	Edeet Ravel	A Wall of Light	Shortlist	
2006	Adrienne Clarkson Alice Munro Michael Winter	Vincent Lam	Bloodletting & Miraculous Cures	Winner	
2006	Adrienne Clarkson Alice Munro Michael Winter	Rawi Hage	De Niro's Game	Shortlist	
2006	Adrienne Clarkson Alice Munro Michael Winter	Pascale Quiviger (Sheila Fischman, tr.)	The Perfect Circle	Shortlist	
2006	Adrienne Clarkson Alice Munro Michael Winter	Gaétan Soucy (Lazer Lederhendler, tr.)	The Immaculate Conception	Shortlist	
2006	Adrienne Clarkson Alice Munro Michael Winter	Carol Windley	Home Schooling	Shortlist	
2006	Adrienne Clarkson Alice Munro Michael Winter	Caroline Adderson	Pleased to Meet You	Longlist	
2006	Adrienne Clarkson Alice Munro Michael Winter	Todd Babiak	The Garneau Block	Longlist	
2006	Adrienne Clarkson Alice Munro Michael Winter	Randy Boyagoda	Governor of the Northern Province	Longlist	
2006	Adrienne Clarkson Alice Munro Michael Winter	Douglas Coupland	JPod	Longlist	
2006	Adrienne Clarkson Alice Munro Michael Winter	Alan Cumyn	The Famished Lover	Longlist	
2006	Adrienne Clarkson Alice Munro Michael Winter	David Adams Richards	The Friends of Meager Fortune	Longlist	
2006	Adrienne Clarkson Alice Munro Michael Winter	Kenneth J. Harvey	Inside	Longlist	
2006	Adrienne Clarkson Alice Munro Michael Winter	Wayne Johnston	The Custodian of Paradise	Longlist	
2006	Adrienne Clarkson Alice Munro Michael Winter	Annette Lapointe	Stolen	Longlist	
2006	Adrienne Clarkson Alice Munro Michael Winter	Russell Wangersky	The Hour of Bad Decisions	Longlist	
2007	David Bergen Camilla Gibb Lorna Goodison	Elizabeth Hay	Late Nights on Air	Winner	
2007	David Bergen Camilla Gibb Lorna Goodison	Michael Ondaatje	Divisadero	Shortlist	
2007	David Bergen Camilla Gibb Lorna Goodison	Daniel Poliquin (Donald Winkler, tr.)	A Secret Between Us	Shortlist	
2007	David Bergen Camilla Gibb Lorna Goodison	M. G. Vassanji	The Assassin's Song	Shortlist	
2007	David Bergen Camilla Gibb Lorna Goodison	Alissa York	Effigy	Shortlist	
2007	David Bergen Camilla Gibb Lorna Goodison	David Chariandy	Soucouyant	Longlist	
2007	David Bergen Camilla Gibb Lorna Goodison	Sharon English	Zero Gravity	Longlist	
2007	David Bergen Camilla Gibb Lorna Goodison	Barbara Gowdy	Helpless	Longlist	
2007	David Bergen Camilla Gibb Lorna Goodison	Lawrence Hill	The Book of Negroes	Longlist	
2007	David Bergen Camilla Gibb Lorna Goodison	Paulette Jiles	Stormy Weather	Longlist	
2007	David Bergen Camilla Gibb Lorna Goodison	D. R. MacDonald	Lauchlin of the Bad Heart	Longlist	
2007	David Bergen Camilla Gibb Lorna Goodison	Claire Mulligan	The Reckoning of Boston Jim	Longlist	
2007	David Bergen Camilla Gibb Lorna Goodison	Mary Novik	Conceit	Longlist	
2007	David Bergen Camilla Gibb Lorna Goodison	Michael Winter	The Architects Are Here	Longlist	
2007	David Bergen Camilla Gibb Lorna Goodison	Richard B. Wright	October	Longlist	
2008	Margaret Atwood Bob Rae Colm Tóibín	Joseph Boyden	Through Black Spruce	Winner	
2008	Margaret Atwood Bob Rae Colm Tóibín	Anthony De Sa	Barnacle Love	Shortlist	
2008	Margaret Atwood Bob Rae Colm Tóibín	Marina Endicott	Good to a Fault	Shortlist	
2008	Margaret Atwood Bob Rae Colm Tóibín	Rawi Hage	Cockroach	Shortlist	
2008	Margaret Atwood Bob Rae Colm Tóibín	Mary Swan	The Boys in the Trees	Shortlist	
2008	Margaret Atwood Bob Rae Colm Tóibín	David Bergen	The Retreat	Longlist	
2008	Margaret Atwood Bob Rae Colm Tóibín	Austin Clarke	More	Longlist	
2008	Margaret Atwood Bob Rae Colm Tóibín	Emma Donoghue	The Sealed Letter	Longlist	
2008	Margaret Atwood Bob Rae Colm Tóibín	Steven Galloway	The Cellist of Sarajevo	Longlist	
2008	Margaret Atwood Bob Rae Colm Tóibín	Kenneth J. Harvey	Blackstrap Hawco	Longlist	
2008	Margaret Atwood Bob Rae Colm Tóibín	Patrick Lane	Red Dog, Red Dog	Longlist	
2008	Margaret Atwood Bob Rae Colm Tóibín	Pasha Malla	The Withdrawal Method	Longlist	
2008	Margaret Atwood Bob Rae Colm Tóibín	Paul Quarrington	The Ravine	Longlist	
2008	Margaret Atwood Bob Rae Colm Tóibín	Nino Ricci	The Origin of Species	Longlist	
2008	Margaret Atwood Bob Rae Colm Tóibín	David Adams Richards	The Lost Highway	Longlist	
2009	Russell Banks Victoria Glendinning Alistair MacLeod	Linden MacIntyre	The Bishop's Man	Winner	
2009	Russell Banks Victoria Glendinning Alistair MacLeod	Kim Echlin	The Disappeared	Shortlist	
2009	Russell Banks Victoria Glendinning Alistair MacLeod	Annabel Lyon	The Golden Mean	Shortlist	
2009	Russell Banks Victoria Glendinning Alistair MacLeod	Colin McAdam	Fall	Shortlist	
2009	Russell Banks Victoria Glendinning Alistair MacLeod	Anne Michaels	The Winter Vault	Shortlist	
2009	Russell Banks Victoria Glendinning Alistair MacLeod	Margaret Atwood	The Year of the Flood	Longlist	
2009	Russell Banks Victoria Glendinning Alistair MacLeod	Martha Baillie	The Incident Report	Longlist	
2009	Russell Banks Victoria Glendinning Alistair MacLeod	Claire Holden Rothman	The Heart Specialist	Longlist	
2009	Russell Banks Victoria Glendinning Alistair MacLeod	Paulette Jiles	The Color of Lightning	Longlist	
2009	Russell Banks Victoria Glendinning Alistair MacLeod	Jeanette Lynes	The Factory Voice	Longlist	
2009	Russell Banks Victoria Glendinning Alistair MacLeod	Shani Mootoo	Valmiki's Daughter	Longlist	
2009	Russell Banks Victoria Glendinning Alistair MacLeod	Kate Pullinger	The Mistress of Nothing	Longlist	

=== 2010s ===
Year	Jury	Author	Book	Result	Ref.
2010	Michael Enright Claire Messud Ali Smith	Johanna Skibsrud	The Sentimentalists	Winner	
2010	Michael Enright Claire Messud Ali Smith	David Bergen	The Matter with Morris	Shortlist	
2010	Michael Enright Claire Messud Ali Smith	Alexander MacLeod	Light Lifting	Shortlist	
2010	Michael Enright Claire Messud Ali Smith	Sarah Selecky	This Cake Is for the Party	Shortlist	
2010	Michael Enright Claire Messud Ali Smith	Kathleen Winter	Annabel	Shortlist	
2010	Michael Enright Claire Messud Ali Smith	Douglas Coupland	Player One	Longlist	
2010	Michael Enright Claire Messud Ali Smith	Michael Helm	Cities of Refuge	Longlist	
2010	Michael Enright Claire Messud Ali Smith	Avner Mandelman	The Debba	Longlist	
2010	Michael Enright Claire Messud Ali Smith	Tom Rachman	The Imperfectionists	Longlist	
2010	Michael Enright Claire Messud Ali Smith	Cordelia Strube	Lemon	Longlist	
2010	Michael Enright Claire Messud Ali Smith	Joan Thomas	Curiosity	Longlist	
2010	Michael Enright Claire Messud Ali Smith	Jane Urquhart	Sanctuary Line	Longlist	
2010	Michael Enright Claire Messud Ali Smith	Dianne Warren	Cool Water	Longlist	
2011	Annabel Lyon Howard Norman Andrew O'Hagan	Esi Edugyan	Half-Blood Blues	Winner	
2011	Annabel Lyon Howard Norman Andrew O'Hagan	David Bezmozgis	The Free World	Shortlist	
2011	Annabel Lyon Howard Norman Andrew O'Hagan	Lynn Coady	The Antagonist	Shortlist	
2011	Annabel Lyon Howard Norman Andrew O'Hagan	Patrick deWitt	The Sisters Brothers	Shortlist	
2011	Annabel Lyon Howard Norman Andrew O'Hagan	Zsuzsi Gartner	Better Living Through Plastic Explosives	Shortlist	
2011	Annabel Lyon Howard Norman Andrew O'Hagan	Michael Ondaatje	The Cat's Table	Shortlist	
2011	Annabel Lyon Howard Norman Andrew O'Hagan	Clark Blaise	The Meagre Tarmac	Longlist	
2011	Annabel Lyon Howard Norman Andrew O'Hagan	Michael Christie	The Beggar's Garden	Longlist	
2011	Annabel Lyon Howard Norman Andrew O'Hagan	Myrna Dey	Extensions	Longlist	
2011	Annabel Lyon Howard Norman Andrew O'Hagan	Marina Endicott	The Little Shadows	Longlist	
2011	Annabel Lyon Howard Norman Andrew O'Hagan	Genni Gunn	Solitaria	Longlist	
2011	Annabel Lyon Howard Norman Andrew O'Hagan	Pauline Holdstock	Into the Heart of the Country	Longlist	
2011	Annabel Lyon Howard Norman Andrew O'Hagan	Wayne Johnston	A World Elsewhere	Longlist	
2011	Annabel Lyon Howard Norman Andrew O'Hagan	Dany Laferrière (David Homel, tr.)	The Return	Longlist	
2011	Annabel Lyon Howard Norman Andrew O'Hagan	Suzette Mayr	Monoceros	Longlist	
2011	Annabel Lyon Howard Norman Andrew O'Hagan	Guy Vanderhaeghe	A Good Man	Longlist	
2011	Annabel Lyon Howard Norman Andrew O'Hagan	Alexi Zentner	Touch	Longlist	
2012	Roddy Doyle Anna Porter Gary Shteyngart	Will Ferguson	419	Winner	
2012	Roddy Doyle Anna Porter Gary Shteyngart	Nancy Richler	The Imposter Bride	Shortlist	
2012	Roddy Doyle Anna Porter Gary Shteyngart	Alix Ohlin	Inside	Shortlist	
2012	Roddy Doyle Anna Porter Gary Shteyngart	Kim Thúy	Ru	Shortlist	
2012	Roddy Doyle Anna Porter Gary Shteyngart	Russell Wangersky	Whirl Away	Shortlist	
2012	Roddy Doyle Anna Porter Gary Shteyngart	Marjorie Celona	Y	Longlist	
2012	Roddy Doyle Anna Porter Gary Shteyngart	Lauren B. Davis	Our Daily Bread	Longlist	
2012	Roddy Doyle Anna Porter Gary Shteyngart	Cary Fagan	My Life Among the Apes	Longlist	
2012	Roddy Doyle Anna Porter Gary Shteyngart	Robert Hough	Dr. Brinkley's Tower	Longlist	
2012	Roddy Doyle Anna Porter Gary Shteyngart	Billie Livingston	One Good Hustle	Longlist	
2012	Roddy Doyle Anna Porter Gary Shteyngart	Annabel Lyon	The Sweet Girl	Longlist	
2012	Roddy Doyle Anna Porter Gary Shteyngart	Katrina Onstad	Everybody Has Everything	Longlist	
2012	Roddy Doyle Anna Porter Gary Shteyngart	C. S. Richardson	The Emperor of Paris	Longlist	
2013	Margaret Atwood Esi Edugyan Jonathan Lethem	Lynn Coady	Hellgoing	Winner	
2013	Margaret Atwood Esi Edugyan Jonathan Lethem	Dennis Bock	Going Home Again	Shortlist	
2013	Margaret Atwood Esi Edugyan Jonathan Lethem	Craig Davidson	Cataract City	Shortlist	
2013	Margaret Atwood Esi Edugyan Jonathan Lethem	Lisa Moore	Caught	Shortlist	
2013	Margaret Atwood Esi Edugyan Jonathan Lethem	Dan Vyleta	The Crooked Maid	Shortlist	
2013	Margaret Atwood Esi Edugyan Jonathan Lethem	Joseph Boyden	The Orenda	Longlist	
2013	Margaret Atwood Esi Edugyan Jonathan Lethem	Elisabeth de Mariaffi	How to Get Along With Women	Longlist	
2013	Margaret Atwood Esi Edugyan Jonathan Lethem	David Gilmour	Extraordinary	Longlist	
2013	Margaret Atwood Esi Edugyan Jonathan Lethem	Wayne Grady	Emancipation Day	Longlist	
2013	Margaret Atwood Esi Edugyan Jonathan Lethem	Louis Hamelin (Wayne Grady, tr.)	October 1970	Longlist	
2013	Margaret Atwood Esi Edugyan Jonathan Lethem	Wayne Johnston	The Son of a Certain Woman	Longlist	
2013	Margaret Atwood Esi Edugyan Jonathan Lethem	Claire Messud	The Woman Upstairs	Longlist	
2013	Margaret Atwood Esi Edugyan Jonathan Lethem	Michael Winter	Minister Without Portfolio	Longlist	
2014	Shauna Singh Baldwin Justin Cartwright Francine Prose	Sean Michaels	Us Conductors	Winner	
2014	Shauna Singh Baldwin Justin Cartwright Francine Prose	David Bezmozgis	The Betrayers	Shortlist	
2014	Shauna Singh Baldwin Justin Cartwright Francine Prose	Frances Itani	Tell	Shortlist	
2014	Shauna Singh Baldwin Justin Cartwright Francine Prose	Heather O'Neill	The Girl Who Was Saturday Night	Shortlist	
2014	Shauna Singh Baldwin Justin Cartwright Francine Prose	Miriam Toews	All My Puny Sorrows	Shortlist	
2014	Shauna Singh Baldwin Justin Cartwright Francine Prose	Padma Viswanathan	The Ever After of Ashwin Rao	Shortlist	
2014	Shauna Singh Baldwin Justin Cartwright Francine Prose	Arjun Basu	Waiting for the Man	Longlist	
2014	Shauna Singh Baldwin Justin Cartwright Francine Prose	Rivka Galchen	American Innovations	Longlist	
2014	Shauna Singh Baldwin Justin Cartwright Francine Prose	Claire Holden Rothman	My October	Longlist	
2014	Shauna Singh Baldwin Justin Cartwright Francine Prose	Jennifer LoveGrove	Watch How We Walk	Longlist	
2014	Shauna Singh Baldwin Justin Cartwright Francine Prose	Shani Mootoo	Moving Forwards Sideways Like a Crab	Longlist	
2014	Shauna Singh Baldwin Justin Cartwright Francine Prose	Kathy Page	Paradise and Elsewhere	Longlist	
2015	John Boyne Cecil Foster Alexander MacLeod Helen Oyeyemi Alison Pick	André Alexis	Fifteen Dogs	Winner	
2015	John Boyne Cecil Foster Alexander MacLeod Helen Oyeyemi Alison Pick	Samuel Archibald	Arvida	Shortlist	
2015	John Boyne Cecil Foster Alexander MacLeod Helen Oyeyemi Alison Pick	Rachel Cusk	Outline	Shortlist	
2015	John Boyne Cecil Foster Alexander MacLeod Helen Oyeyemi Alison Pick	Heather O'Neill	Daydreams of Angels	Shortlist	
2015	John Boyne Cecil Foster Alexander MacLeod Helen Oyeyemi Alison Pick	Anakana Schofield	Martin John	Shortlist	
2015	John Boyne Cecil Foster Alexander MacLeod Helen Oyeyemi Alison Pick	Michael Christie	If I Fall, If I Die	Longlist	
2015	John Boyne Cecil Foster Alexander MacLeod Helen Oyeyemi Alison Pick	Patrick deWitt	Undermajordomo Minor	Longlist	
2015	John Boyne Cecil Foster Alexander MacLeod Helen Oyeyemi Alison Pick	Marina Endicott	Close to Hugh	Longlist	
2015	John Boyne Cecil Foster Alexander MacLeod Helen Oyeyemi Alison Pick	Connie Gault	A Beauty	Longlist	
2015	John Boyne Cecil Foster Alexander MacLeod Helen Oyeyemi Alison Pick	Alix Hawley	All True Not a Lie in It	Longlist	
2015	John Boyne Cecil Foster Alexander MacLeod Helen Oyeyemi Alison Pick	Clifford Jackman	The Winter Family	Longlist	
2015	John Boyne Cecil Foster Alexander MacLeod Helen Oyeyemi Alison Pick	Russell Smith	Confidence	Longlist	
2016	Samantha Harvey Jeet Heer Lawrence Hill Alan Warner Kathleen Winter	Madeleine Thien	Do Not Say We Have Nothing	Winner	
2016	Samantha Harvey Jeet Heer Lawrence Hill Alan Warner Kathleen Winter	Mona Awad	13 Ways of Looking at a Fat Girl	Shortlist	
2016	Samantha Harvey Jeet Heer Lawrence Hill Alan Warner Kathleen Winter	Gary Barwin	Yiddish for Pirates	Shortlist	
2016	Samantha Harvey Jeet Heer Lawrence Hill Alan Warner Kathleen Winter	Emma Donoghue	The Wonder	Shortlist	
2016	Samantha Harvey Jeet Heer Lawrence Hill Alan Warner Kathleen Winter	Catherine Leroux	The Party Wall	Shortlist	
2016	Samantha Harvey Jeet Heer Lawrence Hill Alan Warner Kathleen Winter	Zoe Whittall	The Best Kind of People	Shortlist	
2016	Samantha Harvey Jeet Heer Lawrence Hill Alan Warner Kathleen Winter	Andrew Battershill	Pillow	Longlist	
2016	Samantha Harvey Jeet Heer Lawrence Hill Alan Warner Kathleen Winter	David Bergen	Stranger	Longlist	
2016	Samantha Harvey Jeet Heer Lawrence Hill Alan Warner Kathleen Winter	Kathy Page	The Two of Us	Longlist	
2016	Samantha Harvey Jeet Heer Lawrence Hill Alan Warner Kathleen Winter	Susan Perly	Death Valley	Longlist	
2016	Samantha Harvey Jeet Heer Lawrence Hill Alan Warner Kathleen Winter	Kerry Lee Powell	Willem De Kooning's Paintbrush	Longlist	
2016	Samantha Harvey Jeet Heer Lawrence Hill Alan Warner Kathleen Winter	Steven Price	By Gaslight	Longlist	
2017	André Alexis Anita Rau Badami Richard Beard Lynn Coady Nathan Englander	Michael Redhill	Bellevue Square	Winner	
2017	André Alexis Anita Rau Badami Richard Beard Lynn Coady Nathan Englander	Rachel Cusk	Transit	Shortlist	
2017	André Alexis Anita Rau Badami Richard Beard Lynn Coady Nathan Englander	Ed O'Loughlin	Minds of Winter	Shortlist	
2017	André Alexis Anita Rau Badami Richard Beard Lynn Coady Nathan Englander	Eden Robinson	Son of a Trickster	Shortlist	
2017	André Alexis Anita Rau Badami Richard Beard Lynn Coady Nathan Englander	Michelle Winters	I Am a Truck	Shortlist	
2017	André Alexis Anita Rau Badami Richard Beard Lynn Coady Nathan Englander	David Chariandy	Brother	Longlist	
2017	André Alexis Anita Rau Badami Richard Beard Lynn Coady Nathan Englander	David Demchuk	The Bone Mother	Longlist	
2017	André Alexis Anita Rau Badami Richard Beard Lynn Coady Nathan Englander	Joel Thomas Hynes	We'll All Be Burnt in Our Beds Some Night	Longlist	
2017	André Alexis Anita Rau Badami Richard Beard Lynn Coady Nathan Englander	Andrée A. Michaud	Boundary	Longlist	
2017	André Alexis Anita Rau Badami Richard Beard Lynn Coady Nathan Englander	Josip Novakovich	Tumbleweed	Longlist	
2017	André Alexis Anita Rau Badami Richard Beard Lynn Coady Nathan Englander	Zoey Leigh Peterson	Next Year, For Sure	Longlist	
2017	André Alexis Anita Rau Badami Richard Beard Lynn Coady Nathan Englander	Deborah Willis	The Dark and Other Love Stories	Longlist	
2018	Kamal Al-Solaylee Maxine Bailey John Freeman Philip Hensher Heather O'Neill	Esi Edugyan	Washington Black	Winner	
2018	Kamal Al-Solaylee Maxine Bailey John Freeman Philip Hensher Heather O'Neill	Patrick deWitt	French Exit	Shortlist	
2018	Kamal Al-Solaylee Maxine Bailey John Freeman Philip Hensher Heather O'Neill	Éric Dupont	Songs for the Cold of Heart	Shortlist	
2018	Kamal Al-Solaylee Maxine Bailey John Freeman Philip Hensher Heather O'Neill	Sheila Heti	Motherhood	Shortlist	
2018	Kamal Al-Solaylee Maxine Bailey John Freeman Philip Hensher Heather O'Neill	Thea Lim	An Ocean of Minutes	Shortlist	
2018	Kamal Al-Solaylee Maxine Bailey John Freeman Philip Hensher Heather O'Neill	Paige Cooper	Zolitude	Longlist	
2018	Kamal Al-Solaylee Maxine Bailey John Freeman Philip Hensher Heather O'Neill	Rawi Hage	Beirut Hellfire Society	Longlist	
2018	Kamal Al-Solaylee Maxine Bailey John Freeman Philip Hensher Heather O'Neill	Emma Hooper	Our Homesick Songs	Longlist	
2018	Kamal Al-Solaylee Maxine Bailey John Freeman Philip Hensher Heather O'Neill	Lisa Moore	Something for Everyone	Longlist	
2018	Kamal Al-Solaylee Maxine Bailey John Freeman Philip Hensher Heather O'Neill	Tanya Tagaq	Split Tooth	Longlist	
2018	Kamal Al-Solaylee Maxine Bailey John Freeman Philip Hensher Heather O'Neill	Kim Thúy	Vi	Longlist	
2018	Kamal Al-Solaylee Maxine Bailey John Freeman Philip Hensher Heather O'Neill	Joshua Whitehead	Jonny Appleseed	Longlist	
2019	Randy Boyagoda Aminatta Forna Aleksandar Hemon Donna Bailey Nurse José Teodoro	Ian Williams	Reproduction	Winner	
2019	Randy Boyagoda Aminatta Forna Aleksandar Hemon Donna Bailey Nurse José Teodoro	David Bezmozgis	Immigrant City	Shortlist	
2019	Randy Boyagoda Aminatta Forna Aleksandar Hemon Donna Bailey Nurse José Teodoro	Megan Gail Coles	Small Game Hunting at the Local Coward Gun Club	Shortlist	
2019	Randy Boyagoda Aminatta Forna Aleksandar Hemon Donna Bailey Nurse José Teodoro	Michael Crummey	The Innocents	Shortlist	
2019	Randy Boyagoda Aminatta Forna Aleksandar Hemon Donna Bailey Nurse José Teodoro	Alix Ohlin	Dual Citizens	Shortlist	
2019	Randy Boyagoda Aminatta Forna Aleksandar Hemon Donna Bailey Nurse José Teodoro	Steven Price	Lampedusa	Shortlist	
2019	Randy Boyagoda Aminatta Forna Aleksandar Hemon Donna Bailey Nurse José Teodoro	André Alexis	Days by Moonlight	Longlist	
2019	Randy Boyagoda Aminatta Forna Aleksandar Hemon Donna Bailey Nurse José Teodoro	Margaret Atwood	The Testaments	Longlist	
2019	Randy Boyagoda Aminatta Forna Aleksandar Hemon Donna Bailey Nurse José Teodoro	Michael Christie	Greenwood	Longlist	
2019	Randy Boyagoda Aminatta Forna Aleksandar Hemon Donna Bailey Nurse José Teodoro	Adam Foulds	Dream Sequence	Longlist	
2019	Randy Boyagoda Aminatta Forna Aleksandar Hemon Donna Bailey Nurse José Teodoro	K. D. Miller	Late Breaking	Longlist	
2019	Randy Boyagoda Aminatta Forna Aleksandar Hemon Donna Bailey Nurse José Teodoro	Zalika Reid-Benta	Frying Plantain	Longlist	

=== 2020s ===
Year	Jury	Author	Book	Result	Ref.
2020	Claire Armitstead David Chariandy Tom Rachman Eden Robinson Mark Sakamoto	Souvankham Thammavongsa	How to Pronounce Knife	Winner	
2020	Claire Armitstead David Chariandy Tom Rachman Eden Robinson Mark Sakamoto	Gil Adamson	Ridgerunner	Shortlist	
2020	Claire Armitstead David Chariandy Tom Rachman Eden Robinson Mark Sakamoto	David Bergen	Here the Dark	Shortlist	
2020	Claire Armitstead David Chariandy Tom Rachman Eden Robinson Mark Sakamoto	Emily St. John Mandel	The Glass Hotel	Shortlist	
2020	Claire Armitstead David Chariandy Tom Rachman Eden Robinson Mark Sakamoto	Shani Mootoo	Polar Vortex	Shortlist	
2020	Claire Armitstead David Chariandy Tom Rachman Eden Robinson Mark Sakamoto	Lynn Coady	Watching You Without Me	Longlist	
2020	Claire Armitstead David Chariandy Tom Rachman Eden Robinson Mark Sakamoto	Eva Crocker	All I Ask	Longlist	
2020	Claire Armitstead David Chariandy Tom Rachman Eden Robinson Mark Sakamoto	Emma Donoghue	The Pull of the Stars	Longlist	
2020	Claire Armitstead David Chariandy Tom Rachman Eden Robinson Mark Sakamoto	Francesca Ekwuyasi	Butter Honey Pig Bread	Longlist	
2020	Claire Armitstead David Chariandy Tom Rachman Eden Robinson Mark Sakamoto	Michelle Good	Five Little Indians	Longlist	
2020	Claire Armitstead David Chariandy Tom Rachman Eden Robinson Mark Sakamoto	Kaie Kellough	Dominoes at the Crossroads	Longlist	
2020	Claire Armitstead David Chariandy Tom Rachman Eden Robinson Mark Sakamoto	Thomas King	Indians on Vacation	Longlist	
2020	Claire Armitstead David Chariandy Tom Rachman Eden Robinson Mark Sakamoto	Annabel Lyon	Consent	Longlist	
2020	Claire Armitstead David Chariandy Tom Rachman Eden Robinson Mark Sakamoto	Seth	Clyde Fans	Longlist	
2021	Tash Aw Megan Gail Coles Joshua Ferris Zalika Reid-Benta Joshua Whitehead	Omar El Akkad	What Strange Paradise	Winner	
2021	Tash Aw Megan Gail Coles Joshua Ferris Zalika Reid-Benta Joshua Whitehead	Angélique Lalonde	Glorious Frazzled Beings	Shortlist	
2021	Tash Aw Megan Gail Coles Joshua Ferris Zalika Reid-Benta Joshua Whitehead	Cheluchi Onyemelukwe-Onuobia	The Son of the House	Shortlist	
2021	Tash Aw Megan Gail Coles Joshua Ferris Zalika Reid-Benta Joshua Whitehead	Jordan Tannahill	The Listeners	Shortlist	
2021	Tash Aw Megan Gail Coles Joshua Ferris Zalika Reid-Benta Joshua Whitehead	Miriam Toews	Fight Night	Shortlist	
2021	Tash Aw Megan Gail Coles Joshua Ferris Zalika Reid-Benta Joshua Whitehead	Cedar Bowers	Astra	Longlist	
2021	Tash Aw Megan Gail Coles Joshua Ferris Zalika Reid-Benta Joshua Whitehead	Linda Rui Feng	Swimming Back to Trout River	Longlist	
2021	Tash Aw Megan Gail Coles Joshua Ferris Zalika Reid-Benta Joshua Whitehead	Casey Plett	A Dream of a Woman	Longlist	
2021	Tash Aw Megan Gail Coles Joshua Ferris Zalika Reid-Benta Joshua Whitehead	Rachel Rose	The Octopus Has Three Hearts	Longlist	
2021	Tash Aw Megan Gail Coles Joshua Ferris Zalika Reid-Benta Joshua Whitehead	Kim Thúy	Em	Longlist	
2021	Tash Aw Megan Gail Coles Joshua Ferris Zalika Reid-Benta Joshua Whitehead	Katherena Vermette	The Strangers	Longlist	
2021	Tash Aw Megan Gail Coles Joshua Ferris Zalika Reid-Benta Joshua Whitehead	Aimee Wall	We, Jane	Longlist	
2022	Kaie Kellough Katie Kitamura Casey Plett Waubgeshig Rice Scott Spencer				
2022	Kaie Kellough Katie Kitamura Casey Plett Waubgeshig Rice Scott Spencer	Suzette Mayr	The Sleeping Car Porter	Winner	
2022	Kaie Kellough Katie Kitamura Casey Plett Waubgeshig Rice Scott Spencer	Kim Fu	Lesser Known Monsters of the 21st Century	Shortlist	
2022	Kaie Kellough Katie Kitamura Casey Plett Waubgeshig Rice Scott Spencer	Rawi Hage	Stray Dogs	Shortlist	
2022	Kaie Kellough Katie Kitamura Casey Plett Waubgeshig Rice Scott Spencer	Tsering Yangzom Lama	We Measure the Earth With Our Bodies	Shortlist	
2022	Kaie Kellough Katie Kitamura Casey Plett Waubgeshig Rice Scott Spencer	Noor Naga	If an Egyptian Cannot Speak English	Shortlist	
2022	Kaie Kellough Katie Kitamura Casey Plett Waubgeshig Rice Scott Spencer	Billy-Ray Belcourt	A Minor Chorus	Longlist	
2022	Kaie Kellough Katie Kitamura Casey Plett Waubgeshig Rice Scott Spencer	André Forget	In the City of Pigs	Longlist	
2022	Kaie Kellough Katie Kitamura Casey Plett Waubgeshig Rice Scott Spencer	Sheila Heti	Pure Colour	Longlist	
2022	Kaie Kellough Katie Kitamura Casey Plett Waubgeshig Rice Scott Spencer	Brian Thomas Isaac	All the Quiet Places	Longlist	
2022	Kaie Kellough Katie Kitamura Casey Plett Waubgeshig Rice Scott Spencer	Conor Kerr	Avenue of Champions	Longlist	
2022	Kaie Kellough Katie Kitamura Casey Plett Waubgeshig Rice Scott Spencer	André Narbonne	Lucien & Olivia	Longlist	
2022	Kaie Kellough Katie Kitamura Casey Plett Waubgeshig Rice Scott Spencer	Dimitri Nasrallah	Hotline	Longlist	
2022	Kaie Kellough Katie Kitamura Casey Plett Waubgeshig Rice Scott Spencer	Fawn Parker	What We Both Know	Longlist	
2022	Kaie Kellough Katie Kitamura Casey Plett Waubgeshig Rice Scott Spencer	Antoine Wilson	Mouth to Mouth	Longlist	
2023	Ian Williams Sharon Bala Brian Thomas Isaac Rebecca Makkai Neel Mukherjee				
2023	Ian Williams Sharon Bala Brian Thomas Isaac Rebecca Makkai Neel Mukherjee	Sarah Bernstein	Study for Obedience	Winner	
2023	Ian Williams Sharon Bala Brian Thomas Isaac Rebecca Makkai Neel Mukherjee	Eleanor Catton	Birnam Wood	Shortlist	
2023	Ian Williams Sharon Bala Brian Thomas Isaac Rebecca Makkai Neel Mukherjee	Kevin Chong	The Double Life of Benson Yu	Shortlist	
2023	Ian Williams Sharon Bala Brian Thomas Isaac Rebecca Makkai Neel Mukherjee	Dionne Irving	The Islands	Shortlist	
2023	Ian Williams Sharon Bala Brian Thomas Isaac Rebecca Makkai Neel Mukherjee	C. S. Richardson	All the Colour in the World	Shortlist	
2023	Ian Williams Sharon Bala Brian Thomas Isaac Rebecca Makkai Neel Mukherjee	David Bergen	Away from the Dead	Longlist	
2023	Ian Williams Sharon Bala Brian Thomas Isaac Rebecca Makkai Neel Mukherjee	Nina Dunic	The Clarion	Longlist	
2023	Ian Williams Sharon Bala Brian Thomas Isaac Rebecca Makkai Neel Mukherjee	Erum Shazia Hasan	We Meant Well	Longlist	
2023	Ian Williams Sharon Bala Brian Thomas Isaac Rebecca Makkai Neel Mukherjee	Kathryn Kuitenbrouwer	Wait Softly Brother	Longlist	
2023	Ian Williams Sharon Bala Brian Thomas Isaac Rebecca Makkai Neel Mukherjee	Menaka Raman-Wilms	The Rooftop Garden	Longlist	
2023	Ian Williams Sharon Bala Brian Thomas Isaac Rebecca Makkai Neel Mukherjee	Kasia Van Schaik	We Have Never Lived on Earth	Longlist	
2023	Ian Williams Sharon Bala Brian Thomas Isaac Rebecca Makkai Neel Mukherjee	Deborah Willis	Girlfriend on Mars	Longlist	
2024	Noah Richler Kevin Chong Molly Johnson				
2024	Noah Richler Kevin Chong Molly Johnson	Anne Michaels	Held	Winner	
2024	Noah Richler Kevin Chong Molly Johnson	Éric Chacour (Pablo Strauss, tr.)	What I Know About You	Shortlist	
2024	Noah Richler Kevin Chong Molly Johnson	Anne Fleming	Curiosities	Shortlist	
2024	Noah Richler Kevin Chong Molly Johnson	Conor Kerr	Prairie Edge	Shortlist	
2024	Noah Richler Kevin Chong Molly Johnson	Deepa Rajagopalan	Peacocks of Instagram	Shortlist	
2024	Noah Richler Kevin Chong Molly Johnson	Caroline Adderson	A Way to Be Happy	Longlist	
2024	Noah Richler Kevin Chong Molly Johnson	Shashi Bhat	Death by a Thousand Cuts	Longlist	
2024	Noah Richler Kevin Chong Molly Johnson	Corinna Chong	Bad Land	Longlist	
2024	Noah Richler Kevin Chong Molly Johnson	Claire Messud	This Strange Eventful History	Longlist	
2024	Noah Richler Kevin Chong Molly Johnson	Loghan Paylor	The Cure for Drowning	Longlist	
2024	Noah Richler Kevin Chong Molly Johnson	Jane Urquhart	In Winter I Get Up at Night	Longlist	
2024	Noah Richler Kevin Chong Molly Johnson	Katherena Vermette	real ones	Longlist	
2025	Dionne Irving Loghan Paylor Deepa Rajagopalan				
2025	Dionne Irving Loghan Paylor Deepa Rajagopalan	Souvankham Thammavongsa	Pick a Colour	Winner	
2025	Dionne Irving Loghan Paylor Deepa Rajagopalan	Mona Awad	We Love You, Bunny	Shortlist	
2025	Dionne Irving Loghan Paylor Deepa Rajagopalan	Eddy Boudel Tan	The Tiger and the Cosmonaut	Shortlist	
2025	Dionne Irving Loghan Paylor Deepa Rajagopalan	Emma Donoghue	The Paris Express	Shortlist	
2025	Dionne Irving Loghan Paylor Deepa Rajagopalan	Emma Knight	The Life Cycle of the Common Octopus	Shortlist	
2025	Dionne Irving Loghan Paylor Deepa Rajagopalan	André Alexis	Other Worlds	Longlist	
2025	Dionne Irving Loghan Paylor Deepa Rajagopalan	Kirti Bhadresa	An Astonishment of Stars	Longlist	
2025	Dionne Irving Loghan Paylor Deepa Rajagopalan	Otoniya J. Okot Bitek	We, the Kindling	Longlist	
2025	Dionne Irving Loghan Paylor Deepa Rajagopalan	Fanny Britt (Susan Ouriou, tr.)	Sugaring Off	Longlist	
2025	Dionne Irving Loghan Paylor Deepa Rajagopalan	Joanna Cockerline	Still	Longlist	
2025	Dionne Irving Loghan Paylor Deepa Rajagopalan	Holly Kennedy	The Sideways Life of Denny Voss	Longlist	
2025	Dionne Irving Loghan Paylor Deepa Rajagopalan	Amanda Leduc	Wild Life	Longlist	
2025	Dionne Irving Loghan Paylor Deepa Rajagopalan	Bindu Suresh	The Road Between Us	Longlist	
2025	Dionne Irving Loghan Paylor Deepa Rajagopalan	Ian Williams	You've Changed	Longlist	
2026	Jenn Baerg Steyn Lori Cheverie Chris Hall Sarah Klassen Sean Liburd Dan Macdonald Danielle McNally Rupert McNally Carmela Vedar				
2026	Jenn Baerg Steyn Lori Cheverie Chris Hall Sarah Klassen Sean Liburd Dan Macdonald Danielle McNally Rupert McNally Carmela Vedar	Nicholas Herring	Your Breath in Charcoal	Winner	
2026	Jenn Baerg Steyn Lori Cheverie Chris Hall Sarah Klassen Sean Liburd Dan Macdonald Danielle McNally Rupert McNally Carmela Vedar	Tara Gereaux	Wild People Quiet	Shortlist	
2026	Jenn Baerg Steyn Lori Cheverie Chris Hall Sarah Klassen Sean Liburd Dan Macdonald Danielle McNally Rupert McNally Carmela Vedar	Michelle Good	Eliza Sunshine	Shortlist	
2026	Jenn Baerg Steyn Lori Cheverie Chris Hall Sarah Klassen Sean Liburd Dan Macdonald Danielle McNally Rupert McNally Carmela Vedar	Nazanine Hozar	The Small Ones	Shortlist	
2026	Jenn Baerg Steyn Lori Cheverie Chris Hall Sarah Klassen Sean Liburd Dan Macdonald Danielle McNally Rupert McNally Carmela Vedar	Patmeena Sabit	Good People	Shortlist	
2026	Jenn Baerg Steyn Lori Cheverie Chris Hall Sarah Klassen Sean Liburd Dan Macdonald Danielle McNally Rupert McNally Carmela Vedar	Jennifer Chevalier	The Winter Witch	Longlist	
2026	Jenn Baerg Steyn Lori Cheverie Chris Hall Sarah Klassen Sean Liburd Dan Macdonald Danielle McNally Rupert McNally Carmela Vedar	Patrick deWitt	Dodge City	Longlist	
2026	Jenn Baerg Steyn Lori Cheverie Chris Hall Sarah Klassen Sean Liburd Dan Macdonald Danielle McNally Rupert McNally Carmela Vedar	Patricia Finn	The Golden Boy	Longlist	
2026	Jenn Baerg Steyn Lori Cheverie Chris Hall Sarah Klassen Sean Liburd Dan Macdonald Danielle McNally Rupert McNally Carmela Vedar	Hollay Ghadery	The Unravelling of Ou	Longlist	
2026	Jenn Baerg Steyn Lori Cheverie Chris Hall Sarah Klassen Sean Liburd Dan Macdonald Danielle McNally Rupert McNally Carmela Vedar	Wayne Johnston	The Novice of Holloway Hall	Longlist	
2026	Jenn Baerg Steyn Lori Cheverie Chris Hall Sarah Klassen Sean Liburd Dan Macdonald Danielle McNally Rupert McNally Carmela Vedar	Colin McAdam	Daphnis and Chloe	Longlist	
2026	Jenn Baerg Steyn Lori Cheverie Chris Hall Sarah Klassen Sean Liburd Dan Macdonald Danielle McNally Rupert McNally Carmela Vedar	Mai Nguyen	Cleo Dang Would Rather Be Dead	Longlist	
2026	Jenn Baerg Steyn Lori Cheverie Chris Hall Sarah Klassen Sean Liburd Dan Macdonald Danielle McNally Rupert McNally Carmela Vedar	Lisa Robertson	Riverwork	Longlist	
2026	Jenn Baerg Steyn Lori Cheverie Chris Hall Sarah Klassen Sean Liburd Dan Macdonald Danielle McNally Rupert McNally Carmela Vedar	Cordelia Strube	At Sea in a Sieve	Longlist	
