= Personals (book) =

2012 poetry collection by Ian Williams

- Author: Ian Williams
- Publisher: Freehand Books
- Publication date: 2012
- Pages: 72

Personals is a 2012 poetry collection by Canadian writer Ian Williams.

== Reception ==
Barb Carey of the Toronto Star wrote that "Witty and linguistically playful, these poems are explorations of different situations where intimacy is sought or hoped for or thwarted, and they cycle through a range of speakers and tones — from wistful to flirty, and brisk to plaintive."

CBC praised it, writing "Jittery, plaintive, and fresh, the poems in Ian Williams' Personals are voiced through a startling variety of speakers who continually rev themselves up to the challenge of connecting with each other, often to no avail."

The book was nominated for the Griffin Poetry Prize.
