= Word Problems (book) =

2021 poetry collection by Ian Williams

- Author: Ian Williams
- Publisher: Coach House Press
- Publication date: 2020
- ISBN: 9781552454145

Word Problems is a 2021 poetry collection by Canadian writer Ian Williams.

== Reception ==
Abiola Regan of the Capilano Review wrote that "Williams delivers moments of levity as deftly as he captures moments of anguish. Visual loops existing within verbal loops existing within visual loops. It is like being on a carnival ride of emotional chaos where you don’t want the ride to end, even if that means sitting in discomfort."

Eric Schmaltz, writing in the journal Canadian Literature, praised the collection. Candace Fertile of the British Columbia Review wrote that "Williams has the ability to jolt readers with a flash of insight, often delivered in such a way as to sneak up and then flatten you."

It won the Raymond Souster Award. It was shortlisted for the ReLit Awards.
