= Mai Nguyen (writer) =

Mai Nguyen is a Canadian writer based in Toronto, Ontario.

Of Vietnamese descent, Nguyen was born in Winnipeg, Manitoba, and raised in Halifax, Nova Scotia. She has worked as a journalist and copywriter for Wired, the Washington Post and the Toronto Star.

Her debut novel, Sunshine Nails, was published in 2023. She followed up in 2026 with Cleo Dang Would Rather Be Dead, which was longlisted for the 2026 Giller Prize.
