= Meadowville, Nova Scotia =

Community in Nova Scotia, Canada

Coordinates: 45°41′42.11″N 62°55′9.8″W

Meadowville in Nova Scotia

Meadowville is a community in the Canadian province of Nova Scotia, located in Pictou County. Author Johanna Skibsrud is a native of Meadowville.
