= Doris Giller =

Canadian journalist

Doris Giller (22 January 1931 – 25 April 1993) was a Canadian journalist, who was best known as a literary editor for the Montreal Gazette and the Toronto Star and as the namesake of the Giller Prize.

Giller was born in Montreal, Quebec on 22 January 1931 to Russian Jewish immigrants Nancy and Edward Giller.

Giller first entered journalism in 1963 as a reporter and feature writer for the Montreal Star, eventually working her way up to positions as night editor, lifestyles editor and entertainment editor, also working as the paper's correspondent in Israel for a time in 1972. After the Montreal Star's demise in 1979, she joined the Gazette as book review editor, expanding and relaunching the paper's books section.

Giller and her husband Jack Rabinovitch moved to Toronto in 1985, where Giller joined the Toronto Star as a books editor and columnist in 1988. She remained with the paper until her death in 1993 of cancer.
