= Patmeena Sabit =

Afghan-American writer

Patmeena Sabit is an Afghan-American writer, whose debut novel Good People was published in 2026.

Born in Kabul, Afghanistan, her family fled to Pakistan as refugees from Operation Baikal-79, before moving to Virginia. She currently lives in Toronto, Ontario, Canada.

Good People was shortlisted for the 2026 Giller Prize.
