= Gail Anderson-Dargatz =

Canadian novelist (born 1963)

- Born: Gail Kathryn Anderson; November 14, 1963 (age 62); Kamloops, British Columbia, Canada
- Education: University of Victoria
- Occupation: Novelist
- Writing career
- Period: 1990s–present
- Notable works: The Cure for Death by Lightning; A Recipe for Bees

Gail Kathryn Anderson-Dargatz (born November 14, 1963) is a Canadian novelist.

Anderson-Dargatz was born in Kamloops, British Columbia, and grew up in Salmon Arm. She studied creative writing at the University of Victoria and taught in the MFA program at the University of British Columbia. She published her debut short story collection The Miss Hereford Stories in 1994, and received a nomination for the Stephen Leacock Memorial Medal for Humour in 1995.

Her first novel, The Cure for Death by Lightning (1996), was an experimental work with a story that unfolded partly through narrative and partly through a collection of recipes and household tips belonging to the narrator's mother. A Canadian bestseller that year, it won the Ethel Wilson Fiction Prize, and was nominated for the Giller Prize and the Books in Canada First Novel Award.

Her second novel, A Recipe for Bees, was published in 1998. Based on her own parents' early relationship, her process of researching the book led her parents to their remarriage to each other after having divorced in 1981. The book was a Giller Prize finalist in 1998.

She has since published the novels A Rhinestone Button (2002), Turtle Valley (2007), The Spawning Grounds (2016), The Almost Wife (2021), The Almost Widow (2023), and The Atlas Keeper (2026).

== Bibliography ==
=== Short story collections ===
- The Miss Hereford Stories (1994) – ISBN 1-55054-160-9

=== Novels ===
- The Cure for Death by Lightning (1996) – ISBN 0-385-72047-5
- A Recipe for Bees (1998) – ISBN 0-385-72048-3
- A Rhinestone Button (2002) – ISBN 0-676-97550-X/ISBN 0-676-97549-6
- Turtle Valley (2007) – ISBN 0-676-97886-X
- The Spawning Grounds (2016) – ISBN 0345810821
- The Almost Wife (2021) – ISBN 1443458422
- The Almost Widow (2023) – ISBN 1443464481
- The Atlas Keeper (2026) – ISBN 978-1-4434-7140-4
