= Alan Cumyn =

Canadian novelist (born 1960)

- Born: 8 January 1960 (age 66); Ottawa
- Allegiance: Canada
- Branch: Canadian Forces
- Awards: Writers' Trust of Canada's Vicky Metcalf Award for Literature for Young People
- Other work: Novelist

Alan Cumyn (born 8 January 1960) is a Canadian novelist who lives in Ottawa, Ontario.

== Biography ==
Born in Ottawa, Alan Cumyn studied at Royal Roads Military College in 1983, and Queen's University before earning an M.A. in Creative Writing and English Literature at the University of Windsor. He has lived across Canada and in China and Indonesia, and worked variously as a geologist's assistant, group home manager, tai chi instructor, English teacher, program officer in international development, human rights researcher and freelance writer. Cumyn's fiction focuses on personal and political relations, often in a cross-cultural context. He now lives in Ottawa with his wife and two daughters.

In 2016, he won the Writers' Trust of Canada's Vicky Metcalf Award for Literature for Young People for his body of work.

== Works ==
- Waiting for Li Ming - 1993
- Between Families and the Sky - 1995
- Man of Bone - 1998 - (Winner of the Ottawa Book Award)
- Burridge Unbound - 2000 - shortlisted for the 2000 Giller Prize
- Losing It - 2001
- The Secret Life of Owen Skye - 2002 (Received a Mr. Christie's Book Award; nominated for a Governor General's Award)
- The Sojourn - 2003
- After Sylvia - 2004 (Nominated for the 2005 TD Canadian Children's Literature Award)
- The Famished Lover - 2006 (longlisted for the Giller Prize)
- Dear Sylvia - 2008 (Winner 2009 Silver Birch Express Award; short-listed Canadian Library Association's Book of the Year for Children)
- Tilt - 2011 (selected by the Junior Library Guild as one of the best young adult novels of 2011)
- Hot Pterodactyl Boyfriend - 2016
- North to Benjamin - 2018 (Bank Street Best Children's Book of the Year Selection Title)
