= You've Changed (book) =

2025 novel by Ian Williams

- Author: Ian Williams
- Genre: Fiction
- Publisher: Random House Canada
- Publication date: 2025
- Media type: Print (hardcover), ebook, audiobook
- Pages: 320

You've Changed is a 2025 satirical novel by Canadian author Ian Williams. It is Williams' eighth novel.

== Plot ==
Beckett loses his job as a carpenter, and is unable to perform sexually with his self-centered and vain wife Princess. After meeting a charismatic male fitness influencer named Gluten, he begins exploring his sexuality. Having been raised in a strict religious Quaker community, he struggles to accept his own homosexuality and come out of the closet.

== Structure ==
The novel employs experimental and poetic devices. Before Beckett meets Gluten, words relating to sex and sexual identity are blacked out on the page. The narrative voice changes over the course of the novel, shifting from third person, to first person, and finally to second person. As the perspective changes, the characterization of Princess becomes less negative and Beckett's own behaviour is portrayed more ambivalently.

Throughout the novel, issues of contemporary sexual and racial identities are satirized and examined.

To better understand the character of Beckett, Williams participated in a three-month construction course in Toronto where he helped to build a house from the ground up and then safely demolished it. He used a working title while writing the first eight drafts of the novel, before coming up with the title "You've Changed". The final title was based on a mural he saw in Toronto. Williams was also inspired by the song "You've Changed", which he called "the soundtrack to the book".

== Reception ==
Zilla Jones of the Winnipeg Free Press praised the book's fluid portrayal of sexuality and race, and its "irreverent humor".

Caroline Noël, writing in the Literary Review of Canada criticized the characters, describing Beckett as a "lacklustre hero" and Princess as "a caricatural shrew".

Theo Dombrowski of The British Columbia Review praised the subtle portrayal of the characters, who he described as being unexpectedly complex beneath the veneer of one-dimensionality.

CBC named it one of the best Canadian fictions of 2025. The novel was longlisted for the Giller Prize.
