= Stanley Park (novel) =

2001 novel by Timothy Taylor

- Author: Timothy Taylor
- Language: English
- Genre: Murder Mystery
- Publisher: Counterpoint LLC
- Publication date: January 1, 2001
- Publication place: Canada
- Pages: paperback, 436 pages

Stanley Park is a novel by Canadian writer Timothy Taylor, published in 2001.

== Overview ==
Jeremy Papier is a Vancouver chef and restaurateur who owns a bistro called The Monkey's Paw. The novel uses a "Bloods vs. Crips" metaphor for the philosophical conflict between chefs such as Papier, who favour local ingredients and menus, and those such as his nemesis Dante Beale, who favour a hip, globalized, "post-national" fusion cuisine.

Papier also endures conflict with his father, an anthropologist studying homelessness in Vancouver's Stanley Park, who draws him into investigating the death of two children in the park.

== Awards and nominations ==
Taylor's debut novel, the book was nominated for the Giller Prize in 2001, and the Rogers Writers' Trust Fiction Prize in 2002. It was subsequently chosen as the 2003 winner of One Book, One Vancouver.

In 2007, the novel was chosen for competition in Canada Reads, where it was championed by musician Jim Cuddy.
