= Martin Sloane =

2001 novel by Michael Redhill

- Author: Michael Redhill
- Language: English
- Publisher: Doubleday Canada
- Publication date: 2001
- Publication place: Canada
- Media type: Print
- Pages: 288
- ISBN: 978-0385259873

Martin Sloane is Canadian author Michael Redhill's first novel, published in 2001 by Doubleday Canada. The novel explores the disappearance of Martin Sloane, a reclusive collage artist from Toronto, through the eyes of Jolene, a young woman from Bloomington, Indiana with whom he had a longstanding casual romantic relationship.

The novel was a shortlisted nominee for the 2001 Giller Prize, and won the Books in Canada First Novel Award in 2002.
