= Michael Redhill =

Canadian poet, playwright and novelist (born 1966)

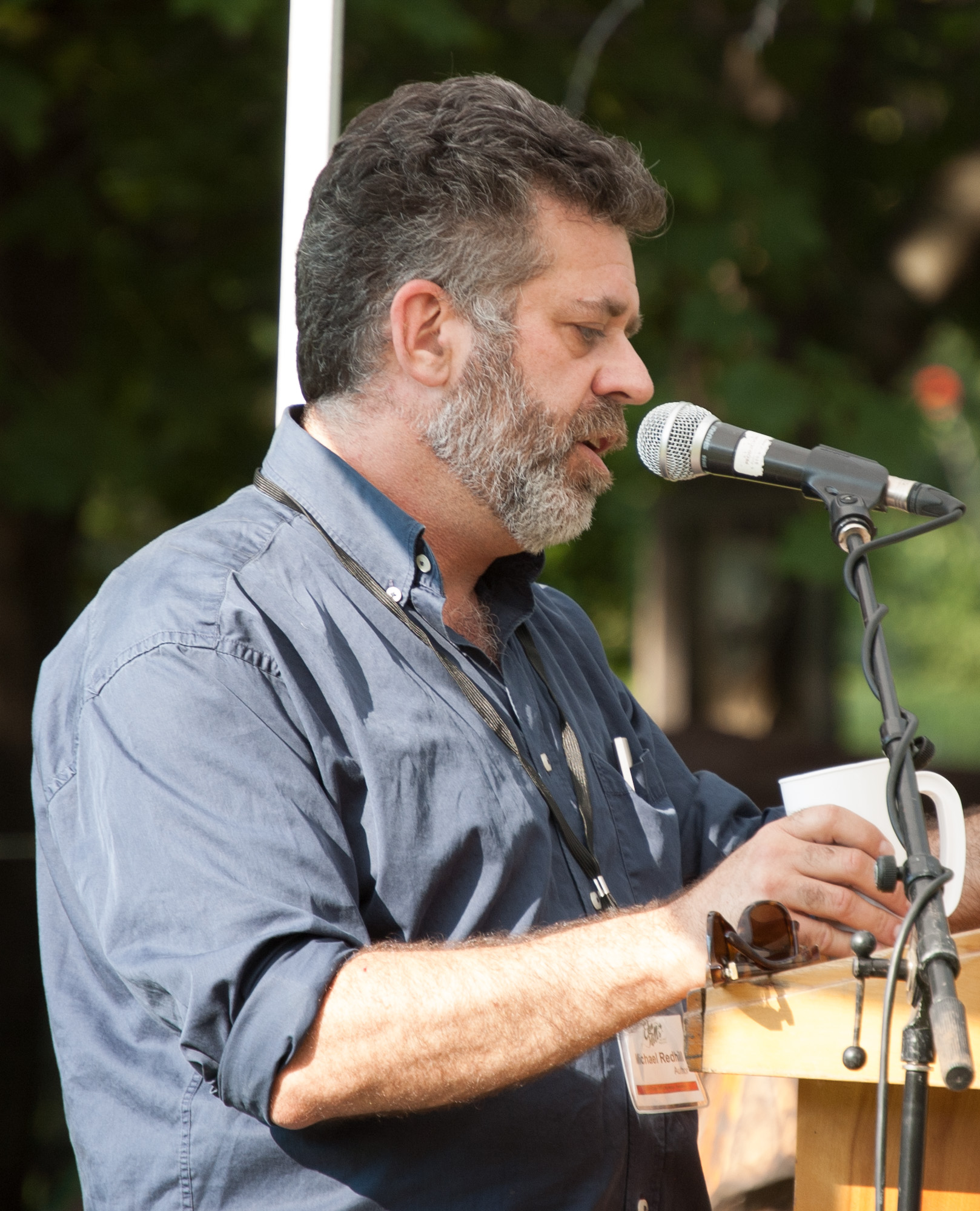
- Redhill at the Eden Mills Writers' Festival
- Born: 12 June 1966 (age 60); Baltimore, Maryland
- Education: Indiana University; York University; University of Toronto
- Children: 2
- Writing career
- Pen name: Inger Ash Wolfe
- Notable work: Bellevue Square (2017)
- Notable awards: Giller Prize

Michael Redhill (born 12 June 1966) is an American-born Canadian poet, playwright and novelist. He also writes under the pseudonym Inger Ash Wolfe.

== Early life and education ==
Redhill was born in Baltimore, Maryland, United States, and was raised in the metropolitan area of Toronto, Ontario, Canada. He pursued one year of study at Indiana University, and then returned to Canada, completing his education at York University and the University of Toronto.

== Career ==
Redhill worked on the editorial board of Coach House Press from 1993 to 1996, and was the publisher of the Canadian literary magazine Brick from 2000 to 2009. In 2001, his novel Martin Sloane was shortlisted for the Giller Prize. He won the Giller Prize in 2017 for his novel Bellevue Square.

His newest poetry book, Twitch Force, was published in 2019.

== Work as Inger Ash Wolfe ==
In 2012, Redhill revealed that he is also the author of novels published under the pen name Inger Ash Wolfe, described by the publishers of Wolfe's 2008 mystery as a pseudonym for a "well-known and well-regarded North American literary novelist". The pseudonym was originally to be Inger Wolf until it was recognized that a Danish crime writer already uses that name.

As Wolfe, Redhill published his first mystery novel The Calling in 2008, released simultaneously in Canada, the United States and the United Kingdom. While the book received good reviews, speculation as to the author's real identity played a large role in many of them. Canadian reviewers suggested Linda Spalding, Michael Redhill, Jane Urquhart and David Adams Richards, among others. American reviewers suggested Margaret Atwood, and Farley Mowat. The second novel by Wolfe, The Taken, was published in 2010. The third, A Door in the River, was published in 2012. Each of the books features series detective Hazel Micallef. The fourth novel in the series, The Night Bell, was published in 2015. In August 2014, a film version of The Calling was released, starring Susan Sarandon as Hazel Micallef.

== Publications ==
=== Poetry ===
- Music for Silence (self-published, 1985)
- Temporary Captives (privately published, 1989)
- Impromptu Feats of Balance (Don Mills, ON: Wolsak and Wynn, 1990)
- Lake Nora Arms (Toronto: Coach House, 1993; reissued by House of Anansi, 2001)
- Asphodel (Toronto: McClelland and Stewart, 1997)
- Light-Crossing (Toronto: House of Anansi, 2001)
- Twitch Force (Toronto: House of Anansi, 2019)

=== Fiction ===
- Martin Sloane (Toronto: Doubleday Canada, 2001)
- Fidelity (Toronto: Doubleday Canada, 2003)
- Consolation (Toronto: Doubleday Canada, 2006)
- Bellevue Square (Toronto: Doubleday Canada, 2017)
- The Trial of Katterfelto (Toronto: Knopf Canada, 2025)

=== Fiction as Inger Ash Wolfe ===
- The Calling (Toronto: McClelland & Stewart, 2008)
- The Taken (Toronto: McClelland & Stewart, 2010)
- A Door in the River (Toronto: McClelland & Stewart, 2012)
- The Night Bell (Toronto: McClelland & Stewart, 2015)

=== Drama ===
- Heretics (privately published, 1993)
- Building Jerusalem (Toronto: Playwrights Union Canada, 2001)
- Goodness (Toronto: Coach House, 2005)

=== Anthologies ===
- Discord of Flags (privately published, 1992) (co-editor)
- Blues and True Conclusions (Toronto: House of Anansi, 1996)
- Lost Classics (Toronto: Knopf Canada, 2000) (edited with Esta Spalding, Michael Ondaatje and Linda Spalding) ISBN 0-676-97299-3

== Awards ==
=== Building Jerusalem ===
- Winner of the Dora Award, Best New Play, 2000
- Winner of the Chalmers Award, 2001
- Nominated for the Governor General's Award for Drama, 2001

=== Martin Sloane ===
- Winner of the Books in Canada First Novel Award, 2001
- Winner of the Commonwealth Writers Prize (Canadian-Caribbean Region), 2002
- Nominated for the Giller Prize, 2001
- Nominated for the City of Toronto Book Award, 2002
- Nominated for the Trillium Book Award, 2002
- Nominated for the Torgi/CNIB Award, 2002

=== Consolation ===
- Winner of the City of Toronto Book Award, 2007
- Longlisted for the Man Booker Prize, 2007

=== Bellevue Square ===
- Won the Scotiabank Giller Prize, 2017

=== Other awards ===
- The League of Canadian Poets National Poetry Contest, first prize, 1988
- Norma Epstein Award for poetry (University of Toronto), 1990
- The E.J. Pratt Prize for poetry (University of Toronto), 1991
- The Carol Tambor Best of Edinburgh Award, for Goodness, 2006
- Scotsman Fringe First Award, (Edinburgh Festival Fringe), 2006

== Personal life ==
Redhill has two sons and lives in Toronto.

He had CA$411.46 left in his bank account when he cashed the CA$100,000 Giller Prize cheque for Bellevue Square.
