= Timothy Taylor (writer) =

Canadian writer

- Born: 1963 (age 62–63); Venezuela
- Education: University of Alberta; Queen's University at Kingston

Timothy Taylor (born 1963) is a Canadian novelist, short story writer, journalist, and professor of creative writing.

== Background ==
Born in Venezuela, Taylor was raised in West Vancouver, British Columbia and later in Edmonton, Alberta. He studied economics at the University of Alberta and obtained a Master of Business Administration at the Smith School of Business at Queen's University. During his years in university, Taylor served as an officer in the Canadian Forces Naval Reserves. After graduation, he worked in banking in Toronto, Ontario. In 1987, he returned to Vancouver, British Columbia where he currently resides.

== Writing career ==
Taylor's short story "Doves of Townsend" won the Journey Prize in 2000. He had two other stories on the competition's preliminary list of finalists that year, and is to date the only writer ever to have three short stories compete for the prize in the same year. He subsequently served as a judge for the 2003 award.

His debut novel, Stanley Park, was published by Knopf Canada in 2001. It was nominated for the Giller Prize and the Rogers Writers' Trust Fiction Prize, as well as both the Vancouver and BC Book Awards. It was later chosen to be the 2004 title for One Book, One Vancouver. In 2007, Stanley Park was selected for the annual Canada Reads competition, where it was championed by musician Jim Cuddy.

Stanley Park was followed a year later by Silent Cruise, a collection of eight stories and one novella which was a runner-up for the Danuta Gleed Literary Award. His second novel Story House was published in 2006 and made Canadian bestseller lists. His third novel, The Blue Light Project, also a bestseller in Canada, was released in 2011.

Taylor also writes nonfiction, particularly on food and wine topics. He's been a contributing editor at Vancouver Magazine and a regular contributor at EnRoute, The Walrus, and Eighteen Bridges. He has also written for The Wall Street Journal, Food & Wine, Western Living, The Vancouver Review, Toro, Saturday Night, Adbusters, the National Post and the Vancouver Sun. He has published the non-fiction books The Cranky Connoisseur (2011) and Foodville (2014).

In 2013, Taylor took a position with the University of British Columbia's Creative Writing Program, where he now serves as an associate professor.

Taylor's fourth novel, The Rule of Stephens, was published in 2018.

== Publications ==
=== Novels ===
Timothy Taylor talks about The Blue Light Project on Bookbits radio

- Stanley Park. Toronto: Knopf Canada, 2001. ISBN 0-676-97307-8
- Story House. Toronto: Knopf Canada, 2006. ISBN 0-676-97764-2
- The Blue Light Project. Toronto: Knopf Canada, 2011. ISBN 0-307-39930-3
- The Rule of Stephens. Toronto: Doubleday Canada, 2018. ISBN 0-385-68737-0
- The Rise and Fall of Magic Wolf. Dundurn Press, 2024 ISBN 1-459-75319-4

=== Short stories ===
- Silent Cruise Toronto: Vintage Canada, 2002.

=== Nonfiction ===
- The Internet Handbook for Canadian Lawyers (with M. Drew Jackson): Carswell, 1997. ISBN 0459238353
- The Cranky Connoisseur: New Word City. 2011.
- Foodville: Nonvella. 2014
