= Ian Williams (writer) =

Canadian poet and writer

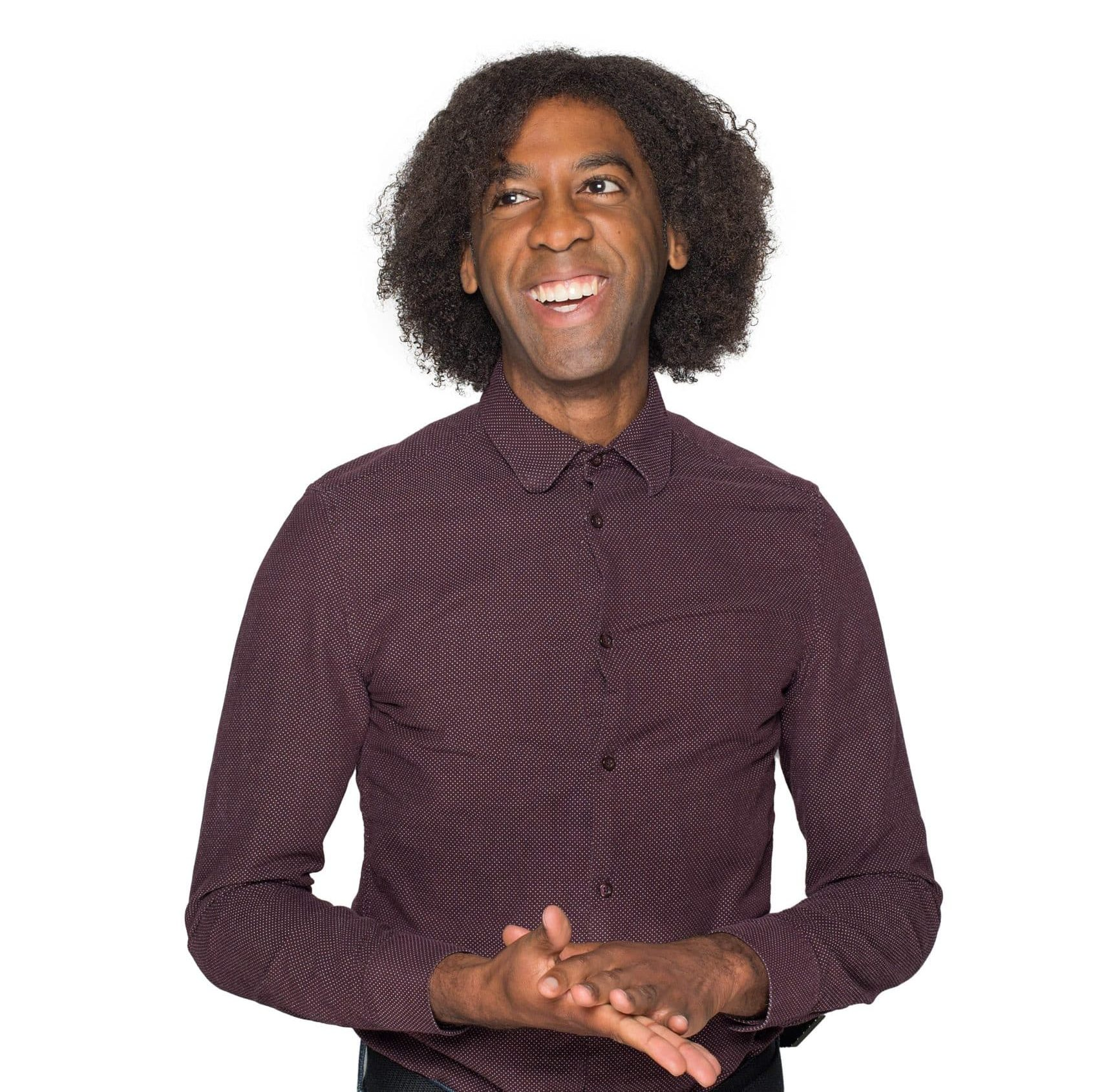
- Born: June 17, 1979 (age 47)
- Education: University of Toronto (BSc, MA, PhD)
- Occupation: Writer
- Writing career
- Genres: Poetry; fiction; non-fiction
- Notable work: Reproduction
- Notable awards: Giller Prize; Danuta Gleed Literary Award; Raymond Souster Award
- Website: ianwilliams.ca

Ian Williams (born June 17, 1979) is a Canadian poet and fiction writer. His collection of short stories, Not Anyone's Anything, won the Danuta Gleed Literary Award, and his debut novel, Reproduction, was awarded the 2019 Giller Prize. His work has been shortlisted for various awards, as well.

Williams earned Honours Bachelor of Science, Master of Arts, and Doctor of Philosophy degrees from the University of Toronto. He was formerly a professor of creative writing at the University of British Columbia and is now a tenured English professor at the University of Toronto. He is also a trustee of The Griffin Trust For Excellence In Poetry. From 2014-2015, he was the Canadian Writer-in-Residence with the University of Calgary’s Distinguished Writers Program, and in 2022, he was the Visiting Fellow at the American Library in Paris.

== Career ==
=== You Know Who You Are ===
Williams’s first book, You Know Who You Are, a poetry collection, was published in 2010 by Wolsak & Wynn. It was shortlisted for the ReLit Poetry Award. The collection includes reimaginings of traditional forms, such as the sonnet, villanelle, and triolet.

=== Not Anyone's Anything ===
Williams’s 2011 short story collection, Not Anyone’s Anything, won the Danuta Gleed Literary Award, which is awarded to the best debut short fiction collection in Canada. The collection is a trio of trios: three sets of three stories, with three of those stories further divided into thirds. The collection is mathematical, musical, and meticulously crafted, with stories that play profoundly with form and feature flash cards, bars of music, architecturally subordinated plots, and dual, parallel narratives. According to Williams, the stories were written during a time when there was much nervousness about ebooks taking over print, and he wanted to write a book that celebrated physical textuality—that inimitable quality of print that cannot be comprehensively translated or usurped by other media.

=== Personals ===
Williams’s third book, Personals, was shortlisted for the Canadian Griffin Poetry Prize. It is a collection of almost love poems where speakers attempt to connect across an increasingly alienating technological landscape. Williams challenges the line as the basic unit of poetry by creating rings or loops. The opening sonnet sequence, “Rings,” which explores infertility, modifies the sonnet form from fourteen lines to thirteen (thereby falling short of the ideal) and ends in a ring, spiralling infinitely into indeterminacy. The collection continues to be one of the decade’s popular books and Canadian students regularly memorize poems for the nation’s largest high school recitation contest.

Williams later went on to become a trustee of The Griffin Trust For Excellence In Poetry, when Michael Ondaatje became a trustee emeritus .

=== Reproduction ===
In 2019, seven years after Personals, Williams published his first novel. Reproduction is a forty-year multigenerational story of how families are formed, destroyed, and reformed. It won the Scotiabank Giller Prize, and was shortlisted for the Amazon First Novel Prize, the Toronto Book Award, and longlisted for the Dublin Literary Award for the best work of global fiction. It was published in the United States by Europa Books, in the United Kingdom by Dialogue Books, and translated into Italian.

Williams states that he wanted to create a novel that could reproduce itself. He spent years in a number of failed experiments, but eventually structured the novel in four parts. Part 1 is structured biologically in 23 paired chapters, like chromosomes. In part 2, the story unfolds mathematically through the perspective of four characters in sixteen chapters. In part 3, the sixteen chapters expand exponentially into 256 (or 16^{2}) small sections. In part 4, the book gets cancer, and tumours appear as superscript and subscript on the main text.

=== Word Problems ===
Word Problems (2020) is a collection of poetry that uses the language of mathematical word problems to raise ethical questions. It won the Raymond Souster Award from the League of Canadian Poets, was a finalist for the ReLit Poetry Award, and a CBC Best Book of Poetry in 2020. The book is divided into two parts with two long poems that run the length of each section. In part 1, the long poem intersects through the other poems horizontally; in part 2, the long poem intersects vertically. The book was called “a game changer to the Canadian poetry scene.”

=== Disorientation: Being Black in the World ===
Disorientation (2021) is a collection of essays on race. As a term, disorientation refers to the effect of racial encounters on racialized people, the whiplash reminder of race that constantly positions racialized people into a role that may be irrelevant in the immediate context. Disorientation was shortlisted for the Hilary Weston Writers’ Trust Prize in Non-fiction and the Hubert Evans Prize, awarded by the BC/Yukon Book Prizes. It was published in the United States by Europa and translated into Italian. Disorientation was a Boston Globe Best Book of the Year. The judges of the Hilary Weston Writers’ Trust Prize describe the book as a "formally inventive and searing meditation on race and Blackness.... [Williams's] writing moves, by turn, from tenderness to despair to anger, yet remains clear-eyed and intellectually rigorous throughout. In an age of hot takes and condemnation, Williams’ essays reflect, explore, and illuminate."

Williams is on the Board of Directors for the Carol Shields Prize for Fiction. He is also on the poetry board for Coach House Books and advisor for the William Southam Journalism Fellows Program. He occasionally reviews for The Guardian.

=== What I Mean to Say ===
Williams was the 2024 CBC Massey Lecturer, resulting in five radio broadcasts and a companion book, What I Mean to Say: Remaking Conversations in Our Time, which were released in November, 2024. In a separate broadcast, aired the week prior to the lectures, Williams discussed his life and the themes of the lectures with CBC Ideas host Nahlah Ayed.

== Awards and honours ==
Awards for Williams's writing
Year	Title	Award	Result	Ref.
2011	Not Anyone’s Anything	Danuta Gleed Literary Award	Winner	
2011	You Know Who You Are	ReLit Awards	Shortlist	
2013	Personals	Griffin Poetry Prize	Finalist	
2013	Personals	ReLit Awards	Shortlist	
2013	Personals	Robert Kroetsch Poetry Book Award	Shortlist	
2019	Reproduction	Giller Prize	Winner	
2019	Reproduction	Amazon Canada First Novel Award	Shortlist	
2019	Reproduction	Toronto Book Award	Shortlist	
2021	Disorientation	Hilary Weston Writers' Trust Prize for Nonfiction	Shortlist	
2021	Disorientation	Hubert Evans Non-Fiction Prize	Shortlist	
2021	Reproduction	International Dublin Literary Award	Longlist	
2021	Word Problems	Raymond Souster Award	Winner	
2021	Word Problems	ReLit Awards	Shortlist	
2025	You've Changed	Giller Prize	Longlist	

== Personal life ==
Williams lives in Toronto.

== Bibliography ==
- You Know Who You Are (Wolsak and Wynn, 2010)
- Not Anyone's Anything (Freehand Books, 2011)
- Personals (Freehand Books, 2012), shortlisted for the 2013 Canadian Griffin Poetry Prize
- Reproduction (Random House Canada, 2019), winner of the 2019 Scotiabank Giller Prize
- Word Problems (Coach House Books, 2020)
- Disorientation: Being Black in the World (Random House Canada, 2021)
- What I Mean To Say: Remaking Conversation in our Time (House of Anansi Press, 2024)
