= The Sentimentalists (novel) =

2010 novel by Johanna Skibsrud

- First edition
- Author: Johanna Skibsrud
- Genre: novel
- Publisher: Gaspereau Press, Douglas & McIntyre; W.W. Norton & Co.
- Publication date: 2010, 1st American ed. in 2011
- Pages: 216 pages
- Awards: 2010 Scotiabank Giller Prize
- ISBN: 9781553658955
- OCLC: 687886506

The Sentimentalists is a novel by Canadian writer Johanna Skibsrud that was the winner of the 2010 Scotiabank Giller Prize.

== Synopsis ==
The novel's protagonist is an unnamed young woman, who seeks to understand her relationship with her father better by investigating his experience in the Vietnam War.

== Publishing delays ==
The book had been rejected by several larger publishing houses before being picked up by Gaspereau Press, a boutique firm based in Nova Scotia which is one of Canada's few book publishing companies that still binds and prints its own books, and was published in an initial print run of just 800 copies. However, the novel's Giller Prize win pushed sales demand for the novel well beyond the 1,000 copies per week that Gaspereau could produce on its own, with the result that the book was virtually unavailable in stores. Chapters-Indigo, Canada's primary bookstore chain, did not have a single copy of the book in stock anywhere in Canada in the entire week of the Giller announcement. However, the paper book's unavailability resulted in a significant increase in ebook sales; the ebook version of the novel quickly became the top-selling title for Kobo devices, outselling even George W. Bush's memoir Decision Points.

Gaspereau subsequently announced that it had sold the novel's trade paperback rights to Douglas & McIntyre, while Gaspereau would continue to print a smaller run of the novel's original edition for book collectors. The Douglas & McIntyre edition retailed for $19.95, while the original Gaspereau edition sold for $27.95. The Douglas & McIntyre edition of the novel arrived in stores on November 25, 2010, fifteen days after the novel's Giller Prize victory was announced.
