= Good People (novel) =

2026 debut novel by Patmeena Sabit

- Author: Patmeena Sabit
- Language: English
- Genre: Literary fiction, mystery
- Publisher: Crown (US) Virago (UK)
- Publication date: February 3, 2026 (US) February 12, 2026 (UK)
- Publication place: United States
- Media type: Print (hardcover), e-book, audiobook
- Pages: 400
- ISBN: 978-0-593-80106-2

Good People is a 2026 debut novel by Afghan American author Patmeena Sabit. Published by Crown in the United States and Virago in the United Kingdom, the novel centers on the Sharaf family, Afghan refugees who have achieved the American dream in Northern Virginia, and the suspicious death of their eldest daughter, Zorah. The narrative is told through voices of neighbors, friends, journalists, and investigators assembling a fractured portrait of the family and the tragedy that befalls them.

== Plot ==
The Sharaf family patriarch Rahmat, his wife Maryam, and their children Omer, Zorah, and two younger siblings fled Afghanistan as refugees and resettled in Northern Virginia. Through years of hard work, Rahmat builds a successful commercial real estate business, and the family becomes a picture of immigrant success, living in an exclusive neighborhood with their children attending prestigious schools. Zorah, the eldest daughter, is considered the apple of her father's eye.

When eighteen-year-old Zorah dies under circumstances initially ruled a car accident, questions emerge about what truly happened. The family finds itself thrust into the court of public opinion, with neighbors, community members, and the media scrutinizing their past and speculating about tensions within the household. As accounts accumulate from those who knew the Sharafs and those who only thought they did, a more complicated picture emerges of a family caught between cultures, of a daughter's rebellion against traditional expectations, and of a community's willingness to abandon those it once celebrated. The novel is structured as an oral history, presenting dozens of eyewitness accounts, interviews, and statements without a central narrative voice. The Sharaf family themselves never speak directly to the reader; their story is only told through others.

== Background and author ==
Patmeena Sabit was born in Kabul a few years after the Soviet invasion of Afghanistan. When she was one month old, her family fled the conflict and became refugees in Pakistan, joining millions of other Afghans seeking refuge there. They later moved to the United States, and Sabit grew up in Virginia. She currently lives in Toronto. Good People is her debut novel.

== Reception ==
Upon publication, Good People received widespread critical acclaim.

The New York Times called it a "gorgeous and powerful debut" and praised Sabit's "austere precision" in constructing a narrative that functions as a "trial where the defendants, the Sharaf family are never allowed to take the stand in their own defense." The New York Times noted that Sabit "borrows freely from the language of cinema and television and even social media, in which interviewees essentially talk directly to the reader, as if into a camera."

Lucy Atkins of The Guardian described the novel as "awfully addictive", but noted that its "structure is both its strength and its greatest limitation. The narrative feeds us, morsel after morsel, so we never have to work too hard; and while there is stimulating cultural commentary, the structure prevents any deeper emotional, interior journey of character."

Kirkus Reviews described the novel as "well-turned and provocative," saying that although "the parade of voices is a bit overlong, and at times the overall voice feels too similar for a novel designed around multiple perspectives. But it thoughtfully underscores the idea that the American melting pot rarely melts consistently."

The Boston Herald described it as "the first great novel of 2026" and compared it favorably to Celeste Ng's bestselling Little Fires Everywhere for its blending of domestic drama with propulsive thriller elements.

Several authors offered praise for the novel. Khaled Hosseini called it "a stunning read" and "the Afghan novel I have been eagerly waiting for," while Ann Patchett described it as "a thrilling tour de force." Paula Hawkins praised the novel as "thought-provoking and utterly addictive," and Monica Ali called it "the best debut I've read in a very long time."

Critics noted the novel's innovative structure, told entirely through the perspectives of outsiders. One reviewer observed that the lack of a central narrator creates "a voyeuristic experience" that keeps readers engaged through "FOMO, fear of missing out."

The novel was a shortlisted finalist for the 2026 Giller Prize.

== Themes ==
Scholars and critics have identified several central themes in Good People, including the immigrant experience, assimilation, the conditional nature of belonging, generational conflict, and the gap between public perception and private reality. The novel explores how "good people" well-intentioned neighbors and community members can harbor prejudices that surface in times of crisis, and how the model minority myth places impossible burdens on immigrant families. The narrative structure itself thematizes the unreliability of collective memory and the way communities construct narratives about outsiders.
