= Taddle Creek (magazine) =

Canadian literary magazine

- Editor-in-Chief/Publisher: Conan Tobias
- Categories: Literary magazine
- Frequency: Biannually
- Circulation: 1,500
- Founded: 1997
- Final issue: 2022
- Country: Canada
- Based in: Toronto
- Language: English
- Website: www.taddlecreekmag.com

Taddle Creek was a literary magazine based in Toronto, Ontario, Canada. It was published twice yearly and had a mix of various kinds of fiction, nonfiction, and visual art.

== Style and content ==
Taddle Creek showcases the work of authors and illustrators who live (primarily, but not exclusively) in the Toronto area. This has led to the perception "in some catty literary circles" that Taddle Creek is "Torontocentric". A typical issue of Taddle Creek will feature a mix of fiction, poetry, interviews, comics, essays, and photographs,

The magazine also has an on-line component that features a large archive of previously published material, subscription information, book recommendations, and contributor bios.

Utne Reader has described the magazine as "offbeat". According to Taddle Creek itself, it aims for an "urban" and contemporary attitude that avoids the "snowstorm on the prairie kind of thing" or even the confines of any one literary style, and calls itself "the journal for those who have come to detest everything the literary magazine has become in the twenty-first century." Broken Pencil's writers declared Taddle Creek a "gorgeous" magazine and said it had achieved "a track record of consistently publishing an extremely engaging collection of fiction, poetry and illustration."

== Editorial guidelines and focus on proofreading ==
Editor Tobias used to be a fact checker at Canadian Business and he brings that quest for accuracy to Taddle Creek. Taddle Creek has emphasized the importance of grammar and proofreading in a number of ways. For example Taddle Creek has taken a firm but humorous stand against the erratic and error filled ways modern writers use apostrophes. It encouraged its readers to join in a letter writing campaign to inform misusers of apostrophes of the error of their ways. At another date it published all the errors it had ever made in a series of entertainingly "absurd" online error messages. Despite the lighthearted approach Tobias calls the error page a "serious business" and intends to report any new errors that slip through. The magazine has even offered free two year subscriptions to any readers that discover new errors. It has also published a reference book calledThe Taddle Creek Guidebook to Fact-Checking Fiction that aims to help writers avoid anachronisms and other factual errors.

Broken Pencil comments on the perception that Taddle Creek has "very rigid grammar and submission expectations". Tobias himself notices that "sometimes their submissions guidelines seem to offend" but sees this as the result of "disparate senses of humour at play".

== History ==
Founded in 1997 by publisher Conan Tobias, the magazine originally served Toronto's Annex neighbourhood with an annual Christmas issue. But the magazine later expanded both its focus and its output—to the whole of Toronto and to twice a year. Taddle Creek is published twice a year in June and December. By 2002, the magazine had found national distribution.

In December 2007, the magazine celebrated its tenth anniversary with an unusually large, 72-page issue, a launch party at Toronto's Gladstone Hotel.

== Commendations and shortlists ==
- 2000 National Magazine Award (Honourable Mention)—Profiles—Alfred Holden, "The Streamlined Man"
- 2001 Heritage Toronto Certificate of Commendation—Alfred Holden—"For writing that illustrates Toronto’s architecture and its contribution to the quality of the city."
- Compuserve Canada Featured Canadian Site (2002)— taddlecreekmag.com
- 2002 National Magazine Award (Honourable Mention)—Poetry—John Degen, "Bicycles"
- 2003 Now magazine Best of Toronto Critics’ Pick—Best T.O. Lit Mag—Taddle Creek
- 2004 National Magazine Award (Honourable Mention)—Words and Pictures—Michael Cho, "Night Time"
- 2005 National Magazine Award (Honourable Mention)—Fiction—Elyse Friedman, "Lost Kitten"
- 2006 Journey Prize (Long List)—David Whitton, "The Eclipse"
- 2007 National Magazine Award (Silver)—Words and Pictures—Michael Cho, "Stars"
- 2008 National Magazine Award (Honourable Mention)—Words and Pictures—Conan Tobias, "Night of the Sewist"
- 2009 National Magazine Award (Honourable Mention)—Words and Pictures—Michael Cho and Conan Tobias, "Trinity"
- 2011 Broken Pencil chooses Editor Tobias as one of "50 people (and places) we love" for his creation of Taddle Creek

== See also ==
- List of literary magazines
