= List of South Asian American–related publications =

The following is a list of books, serials and films with Indian American or South Asian American subject matter.

== Books ==
Non-fiction

- The Karma of Brown Folk by Vijay Prashad
- Uncle Swami by Vijay Prashad
- Everybody was Kung-Fu Fighting by Vijay Prashad
- In My Own Country by Dr. Abraham Verghese
- Olive Witch by Aheer Hoque
- Asian-Indians of Chicago, Illinois (Images of America Series) by The Indo-American Center
- The Truths We Hold: An American Journey by Kamala Harris
- Here We Are: American Dreams, American Nightmares (A Memoir) by Aarti Namdev Shahani
- Can't Is Not an Option: My American Story by Nikki Haley
- The Other One Percent: Indians in America by Sanjoy Chakravorty, Devesh Kapur, Nirvikar Singh
- Good Girls Marry Doctors: South Asian American Daughters on Obedience and Rebellion by Piyali Bhattacharya
- A Part, Yet Apart: South Asians In Asian America by Lavina Shankar, Rajini Srikanth (Editor)

Science-fiction
Fiction

- Caste and Outcast by Dhan Gopal Mukerji
- The Tiger's Daughter by Bharati Mukherjee
- Wife (novel) by Bharati Mukherjee
- Jasmine (novel) by Bharati Mukherjee
- Darkness (short stories) by Bharati Mukherjee
- The Middleman and Other Stories by Bharati Mukherjee
- The Inscrutable Americans by Anurag Mathur
- The Namesake by Jhumpa Lahiri
- Interpreter of Maladies by Jhumpa Lahiri (winner of 2000 Pulitzer Prize for Fiction)
- The Mistress of Spices by Chitra Divakaruni
- The Tennis Partner by Dr. Abraham Verghese
- The Henna Artist by Alka Joshi
- Bollywood Confidential by Sonia Singh
- American Betiya by Anuradha D. Rajurkar
- Family Life by Akhil Sharma
- Zara Hossain is Here by Sabina Khan
- Amina's Song by Hena Khan
- Internment by Samira Ahmed
- Well-Behaved Indian Women by Saumya Dave
- A Place for Us by Fatima Farheen Mirza
- The Sleepwalker's Guide to Dancing by Mira Jacob
- Rising Tiger by Brad Thor

== Magazines and newspapers ==
- https://www.TamilAmericaTV.com/ Tamil America TV
- https://www.newsindiatimes.com/ print and online newspaper
- https://www.desitalk.com/ print and online newspaper
- https://www.desitalkchicago.com/ print and online newspaper
- https://www.gujarattimesusa.com/ print and online newspaper
- Telugu Naadi
- Telugu Patrika (monthly cultural magazine)
- Punjab Mail USA (print and online newspaper)
- India Abroad (newspaper ceased publication 2020)
- Little India (magazine)
- The Indian American (magazine)
- Quami Ekta (print & online newspaper)
- Lok News (print & online newspaper) (ceased publication)
- Valley India Times (print & online newspaper)
- https://www.thejuggernaut.com; The Juggernaut (online publication)
- India Currents (digital magazine)
- India-West (print & online newspaper)
- https://browngirlmagazine.com/ (online publication)
- http://www.vachakam.com (print & online publication)
- https://atlantadunia.com/Dunia/Default.aspx (online publication)
- https://www.usadunia.com/

https://americankahani.com/ News, features, and commentary. https://ww.urbanasian.com; UrbanAsian.com (online publication)

== Feature films ==
- Mississippi Masala (1991)
- My Own Country (1998)
- Chutney Popcorn (1999)
- Monsoon Wedding (2001)
- American Chai (2001)
- American Desi (2001)
- Provoked
- The Guru (2002)
- Bend It Like Beckham (2002) - covers all the Indian American sentiments even though it is a British film
- Green Card Fever (2003)
- Cosmopolitan (2003)
- Dude, Where's the Party? (2003)
- Flavors (film) (2003)
- Harold & Kumar Go to White Castle (2004)
- Bride & Prejudice (2004) - A largely British film also.
- Anokha (2004)
- The Mistress of Spices (2005)
- National Lampoon's Van Wilder: The Rise of Taj (2006)
- Outsourced (2006)
- The Namesake (2007)
- Americanizing Shelley (2007)
- Indian Cowboy (2007)
- Kissing Cousins (2007)
- Marigold (2007 film)
- The Other End of the Line (2008)
- 1 a Minute (2010)
- When Harry Tries to Marry (2011)
- Life! Camera Action... (2012)
- The Distance Between Us (2013)
- Million Dollar Arm (2014)
- Meet the Patels (2014)
- The Problem with Apu (2017)
- The Big Sick (2017)
- C/o Kancharapalem (2018)
- India Sweets and Spices (2021)
