= Robert Lecker =

Canadian professor of English (born 1951)

Robert Lecker FRSC
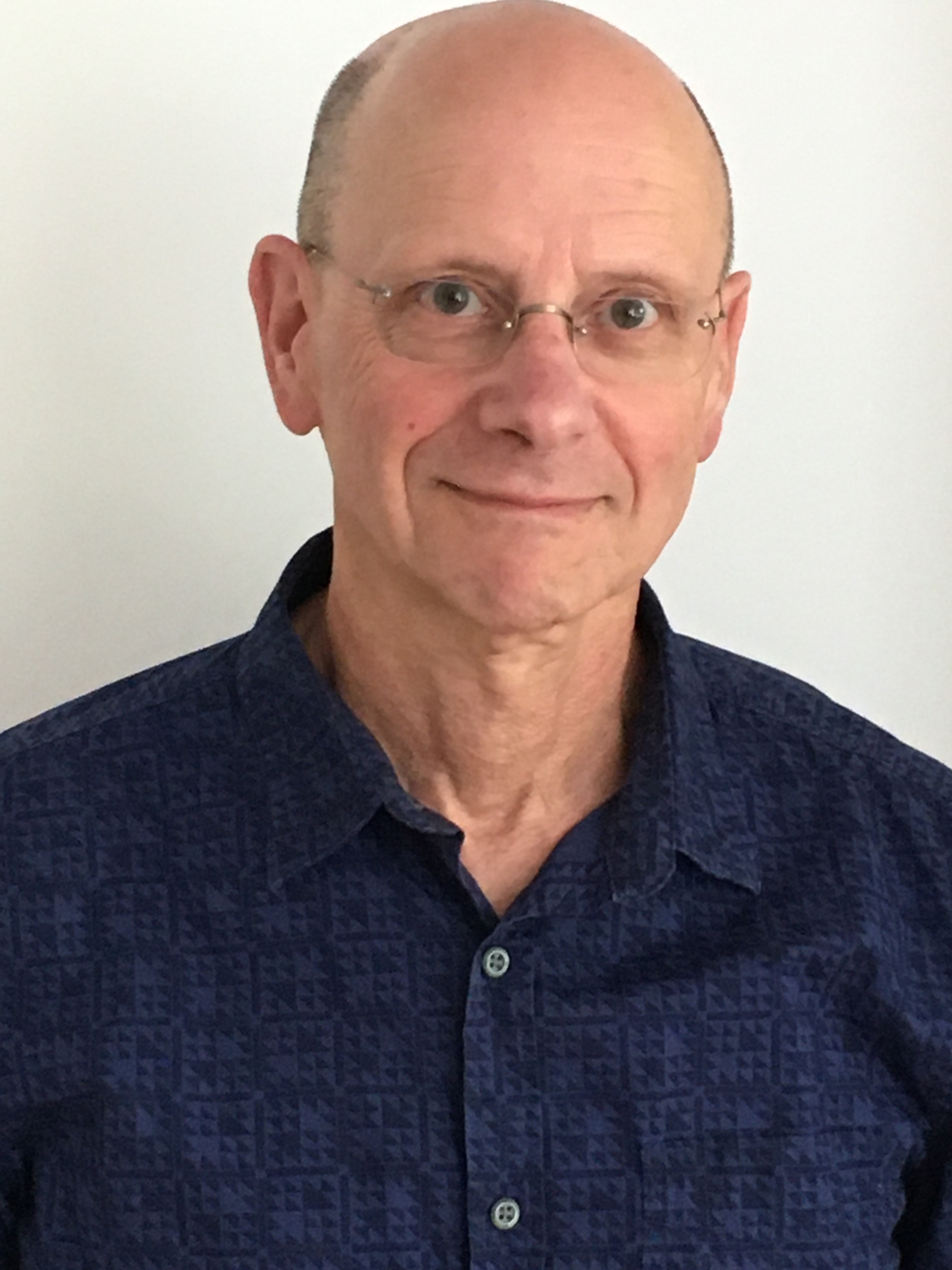
- Born: 1951 (age 74–75); Montreal, Quebec, Canada
- Occupations: Scholar, author
- Awards: Lorne Pierce Medal

Academic background
- Education: York University (BA, 1974; MA, 1976; PhD, 1980)

Academic work
- Institutions: McGill University
- Notable works: Who Was Doris Hedges? The Search for Canada's First Literary Agent
- Website: leckeragency.com

Robert Lecker (born 1951) is a Canadian scholar, author, and Greenshields Professor of English at McGill University, where he specializes in Canadian literature. In 2012, Lecker was named a Fellow of the Royal Society of Canada in recognition of his influential studies on literary value in English Canada and Canadian cultural identity. Lecker founded ECW Press in 1997, co-edited the Canadian literary journal Essays on Canadian Writing between 1975 and 2004, edited several anthologies of Canadian and international literature, and currently heads the Robert Lecker Agency in Montreal.

== Early life and education ==
Lecker was born and raised in Montreal, Quebec, and began his university studies at Sir George Williams University (now Concordia University) in 1970. The following year, he transferred to York University in Toronto, where he met Jack David, who had founded the critical journal Essays on Canadian Writing (ECW)in 1974. Lecker joined the editorial board of ECW in 1975.

Lecker completed his BA (1974), MA (1976), and PhD (1980) in English at York and was awarded a number of fellowships and scholarships throughout these years. Lecker discusses his experiences at York in his 2006 memoir, Dr. Delicious. His PhD dissertation, Time and Form in the Contemporary Canadian Novel, examines disruptive representations of time in seven Canadian novels written between 1968 and 1977.

== Career ==
In 1977 Lecker and Jack David founded ECW Press, which was originally devoted to publishing reference works and critical studies about Canadian literature. The press expanded and moved into commercial trade publishing in the mid-1990s. Lecker managed the Montreal office and David ran the Toronto office. In 2003, Lecker left the press to start his own literary agency, Robert Lecker Agency.

Between 1978 and 1982, Lecker was assistant professor of English at the University of Maine at Orono.

Lecker began teaching at McGill University in 1982. He was Associate Chair of the Department of English from 1984 to 1986, and directed the M.A. Program from 1989 to 1993. He also served as a sexual harassment and discrimination officer for McGill University from 1995 to 1997 and 2005 to 2007. From 1996 to 1998 Lecker was a member of the adjudication committee for the Canada-U.S. Fulbright Program, and in 1999 he was chair of that committee.

He received the H. Noel Fieldhouse Award for Distinguished Teaching at McGill University in 1996. Lecker was named Greenshields Professor of English at McGill University in 2007. In 2012 he was named a Fellow of the Royal Society of Canada and in 2022, he was awarded the Lorne Pierce Medal.

== Writing ==
Lecker is the author of nine books, which are all critical studies of either Canadian authors or theoretical problems related to the study and history of Canadian literature. Over the past 15 years he has focused on two areas in particular: canonicity in Canadian literature and anthology formation as a reflection of the evolution of literary value and taste. In addition to his book publications, Lecker has authored over 60 scholarly articles in journals including PMLA, Critical Inquiry, Canadian Literature, Canadian Poetry, Open Letter, Studies in Canadian Literature, Australasian Canadian Studies, and the American Review of Canadian Studies.

On the Line (1982) includes detailed readings of individual stories by Clark Blaise, John Metcalf, and Hugh Hood. Robert Kroetsch (1986) is a study of the poetry, fiction, and literary criticism of Robert Kroetsch. An Other I (1988) is a study of the fiction of Clark Blaise.

Canadian Canons: Essays in Literary Value (1991) was shortlisted for the 1993 Canadian Federation for the Humanities Raymond Klibansky Book Prize.

Making It Real: The Canonization of English-Canadian Literature (1995) is a study bringing together eight wide-ranging essays on the origins and development of Canadian literary canons. Lecker explores many of the myths surrounding the teaching, studying, publishing, and promotion of Canadian literature. He focuses on the work of Northrop Frye, Frank Davey, and the New Canadian Library series. English-Canadian Literary Anthologies: An Enumerative Bibliography (1997) is first detailed bibliography of Canadian anthologies from 1837 to the present. It lists approximately 2000 anthologies.

Lecker's tragicomic memoir, Dr. Delicious: Memoirs of a Life in CanLit (2006), reviews his career as a publisher and editor of Canadian literature and criticism. The book is also an irreverent history of an explosive era in Canadian literature.

Dennis Lee’s poem, Civil Elegies, originally published in 1968 and revised in 1972, remains one of the most potent poems devoted to the nature of Canadian identity and civil space. In his study The Cadence of Civil Elegies (2006), Lecker shows the poem's importance to Canada's literary canon by emphasizing Lee's new vision of Canada.

Keepers of the Code: English-Canadian Literary Anthologies and the Representation of Nation (2013) is the first book-length history of English-Canadian literary anthologies from 1837 to the present. Lecker aims to show that these anthologies are shaped by the conflict and contact among various individuals and institutions, including publishers, writers, reviewers, professors, tenure committees, funding agencies, critical journals, and banks. Lecker comments on approximately 75 anthologies. The book was released in March 2013 and was positively reviewed in The Times Literary Supplement.

Doris Hedges (1896–1972) was a Montreal author who started Canada's first literary agency in 1946. She published several novels, short stories, and books of poetry; was influential in Montreal literary circles; did a stint as a radio broadcaster; and provided reports to the Wartime Information Board during World War II, possibly as an American spy. Who Was Doris Hedges? The Search for Canada's First Literary Agent (2020) deals with all of Hedges’ works in a chronological fashion, mixing biographical commentary with literary analysis.

== Editorial work ==
In 2018, Lecker was named co-editor (with Lorraine York) of the Routledge series of critical studies of Canadian literature.

Lecker also edited the 24-volume series Canadian Writers and Their Works: Essays on Form, Context, and Development with Jack David and Ellen Quigley. This 24-volume series comprises commentary on 100 Canadian writers from the nineteenth century to the present. Each author is treated in a discrete essay that provides a biography, a critical overview, a description of the writer's milieu, an analysis of each of the writer's works, and a bibliography of primary and secondary material. The volumes are organized chronologically so as to present a historical perspective. The editors coordinated the production of these essays by 100 scholars and released the series over a ten-year period.

Lecker was the senior editor for several multi-volume series published by Macmillan (New York) and G. K. Hall & Co. (Boston), including Masterworks and Critical Essays on World Literature. He was also the Canadian editor for Twayne's World Authors Series. Lecker has edited numerous anthologies of Canadian literature from 1981 to the present, including one large anthology for HarperCollins in New York (the only anthology of Canadian literature published by a mainstream American publisher since 1943).

== Selected bibliography ==
=== Books ===
- On the Line: Readings in the Short Fiction of Clark Blaise, John Metcalf, and Hugh Hood. Downsview, ON: ECW Press, 1982.
- Robert Kroetsch. Boston: Twayne, 1986.
- An Other I: The Fictions of Clark Blaise. Toronto: ECW Press, 1988.
- Making It Real: The Canonization of English-Canadian Literature. Toronto: House of Anansi Press, 1995.
- English-Canadian Literary Anthologies: An Enumerative Bibliography. Compiler. Teeswater, ON: Reference, 1997.
- The Cadence of Civil Elegies. Toronto: Cormorant, 2006.
- Dr. Delicious: Memoirs of a Life in CanLit. Montreal: Véhicule Press, 2006.
- Keepers of the Code: English-Canadian Literary Anthologies and the Representation of Nation. University of Toronto Press, 2013.
- Who Was Doris Hedges? The Search for Canada's First Literary Agent. Montreal: McGill–Queen's University Press, 2020.

=== Anthologies and edited books ===
- Introduction to Poetry: British, American, Canadian. Toronto: Holt, Rinehart and Winston, 1981. With Jack David.
- Canadian Poetry. Two volumes. New Press Canadian Classics. Don Mills, ON: General, 1982. With Jack David.
- Anthology of Maine Literature. Orono, Maine: University of Maine Press, 1982. With Kathleen Brown.
- The Annotated Bibliography of Canada's Major Authors. Eight volumes. ECW Press, 1979–1994. With Jack David.
- Introduction to Fiction. Toronto: Holt, Rinehart and Winston, 1983.
- Canadian Writers and Their Works: Essays on Form, Context, and Development. Twenty-four volumes to date, in two series (Poetry and Fiction). ECW Press, 1982–. With Jack David and Ellen Quigley.
- Introduction to Literature: British, American, Canadian. New York: Harper & Row, 1987. With Jack David and Peter O'Brien.
- The New Canadian Anthology: English-Canadian Poetry and Short Fiction. Toronto: Nelson, 1988. With Jack David.
- Canadian Canons: Essays in Literary Value. University of Toronto Press, 1991.
- Borderlands: Essays in Canadian-American Relations. Toronto: ECW Press, 1991.
- Open Country: Canadian Literature in English. Toronto: Nelson, 2007.
- Anthologizing Canadian Literature: Theoretical and Cultural Perspectives. Waterloo: Wilfrid Laurier University Press, 2015.
