= Ruminator Review =

American book review magazine

- Former editors: Bart Schneider, Margaret Maitland
- Categories: Book review
- Frequency: Quarterly
- Founder: David Unowsky
- Founded: 1986
- Final issue: Fall 2005
- Company: Ruminator Books
- Country: United States
- Based in: St. Paul, Minnesota
- Language: English
- ISSN: 0887-5499

The Ruminator Review, originally the Hungry Mind Review, was a quarterly book review magazine founded by David Unowsky and published in St. Paul, Minnesota from 1986 to 2005. It included reviews of all genres, as well as literary interviews, focusing on work published by smaller presses. It was distributed freely through independent bookstores in the United States.

The review was part of a "creative partnership" centered on the Ruminator Books bookstore at Macalester College, including the bookstore and its independent press, Ruminator Press.

== History ==
=== Hungry Mind Bookstore and Review ===
The Hungry Mind Bookstore was opened in 1970 in St. Paul by Unowsky. In 1972 it moved onto Macalester College campus to become the university bookstore.

By the 1980s, the bookstore had become well known in the region, and was becoming a hub for literary activity. Unowsky helped start a regional booksellers' association. In 1986 he launched the Hungry Mind Review as a critical literary journal, with founding editor Bart Schneider. The review attracted some high-profile writers and reviewers, such as Robert Bly, Andrei Codrescu, Jane Hamilton and Arundhati Roy.

=== Hungry Minds Press ===
In 1995, in response to the disappearance of backlists from the catalogs of traditional publishers' catalogs, Unowsky and his wife started their own independent press, with three partners. Over the next nine years they published 50 titles, calling them "Hungry Mind Finds" or "Ruminator Finds". These included:

- Black Tents of Arabia, Carl R. Raswan
- A Book of Own's Own: People and Their Diaries, Thomas Mallon
- Days and Nights in Calcutta, Clark Blaise and Bharati Mukherjee
- A False Spring, Pat Jordan
- The Soul of the Night: An Astronomical Pilgrimage, Chet Raymo
- Laughing in the Hills, Bill Barich
- Moonshine: A Life in Pursuit of White Liquor, Alec Wilkinson
- Our Like Will Not Be There Again: Notes from the West of Ireland, Lawrence Millman
- A Passage to Ararat, Michael J. Arlen
- The Tree Farm: Replanting a Life, Robert Treuer

=== Ruminator name change ===
In 2000, the Hungry Mind sold its name to Hungry Minds, Inc. (see the paragraph about IDG Books/Hungry Minds at Hungry Minds#Business), publisher of the For Dummies books. After soliciting ideas from its patrons, it became Ruminator Books, Review, and Press.

In 2001 Margaret Maitland became editor of the Review. In 2004, behind on its rent to the university, the bookstore went out of business. The Ruminator Review continued for another year, but published its last issue in Fall 2005.
