= Best Canadian Stories =

Best Canadian Stories is an annual, anthology-like publication and curated selection of short stories in English by Canadian authors in a given calendar year. The texts are generally reprints from Canadian literary magazines, though authors were encouraged, at least in the 1970s, to send their texts directly to the publisher. While literary magazines have a small audience and a generally "ephemeral" character, they are also some of Canada's most prestigious literary fora, e.g. The Malahat Review, Literary Review of Canada, or venues for Canadian writers, e.g. the Jewish Review. First published in 1972 under the title New Canadian Stories, the series quickly became a forum for new and upcoming writers. Beyond its literary focus, the series may be considered a venue for the spread of new Canadianisms and of artful experimentation with Canadian English.

Originally published by Oberon Press in Ottawa, since 2017 the series has been with Biblioasis in Windsor, Ontario.

== Goals and development ==
John Metcalf was an early editor of the project and has seen to the first 50 volumes (1972–2023). The express goal and purpose of the anthology was, firstly, to promote the genre of the short story, sometimes considered "perhaps Canada's greatest contribution to literature", as a genre of major relevance in the Canadian literary scene and, secondly, to offer through literary criticism a "medium in which past work survives".

== Authors ==
Among its authors, Best Canadian Stories includes: Caroline Adderson, Margaret Atwood, Clark Blaise, Lynn Coady, Mavis Gallant, Zsuzsi Gartner, Douglas Glover, Steven Heighton, Isabel Huggan, Mark Anthony Jarman, W. P. Kinsella, Norman Levine, Rohinton Mistry, Alice Munro, Eden Robinson, Leon Rooke, Diane Schoemperlen, Russell Smith, Linda Svendsen, Kathleen Winter.
