= Bloodflowers: Ten Stories =

Short story anthology by W. D. Valgardson

- Author: W. D. Valgardson
- Language: English
- Genre: Short story anthology
- Published: 1973
- Publisher: Oberon Press
- ISBN: 0-88750-085-4

Bloodflowers: Ten Stories (ISBN 0-88750-085-4) is a short story anthology written by Canadian writer W. D. Valgardson. It was published by Oberon Press in Canada in 1973. The title short story was included in Best American Short Stories 1971.

Many short stories involve the use of irony and symbolism and take place in isolated communities.

== Contents ==
- "Bloodflowers"
- "An Act of Mercy"
- "Brothers"
- "Dominion Day"
- "An Afternoon's Drive"
- "First Flight"
- "The Burning"
- "The Job"
- "The Curse"
- "On Lake Therese"
