= A New Athens (novel) =

1977 book by Hugh Hood

- First edition
- Author: Hugh Hood
- Cover artist: Moira Clark
- Language: English
- Series: The New Age series
- Publisher: Oberon Press
- Publication date: 1977
- Publication place: Canada
- Media type: Print
- Pages: 226 pages
- Preceded by: The Swing in the Garden
- Followed by: Reservoir Ravine

A New Athens, first published in 1977, is a novel by Canadian author Hugh Hood and the second in his 12-novel cycle, The New Age. It was preceded by The Swing in the Garden.

== Setting ==
The book is set in southeastern Ontario, Canada between 1952 and 1965 in the fictional city of Stoverville, based on Brockville. Much of the story takes place in the form of reminiscences of the late 1950s and 1960s.

== Story ==
Narrator Matt Goderich, now approaching middle age, has become an art historian. As the novel opens, he is wandering along the back roads of eastern Ontario, contemplating the flora, the history of trains in the region, and decades past. He relates his time as a young student, beginning in 1948, where he is a rare Catholic at the overwhelmingly Protestant Victoria University in the University of Toronto. After a fleeting first romance he meets his future wife Edie, who disappoints her family by converting to Catholicism to marry him. The young couple spends time in her hometown of Stoverville (a fictionalized version of Brockville), where her parents have a boathouse on the Saint Lawrence River. Her father is a well-known politician, and her mother is a brilliant but undiscovered painter. The 'new Athens' of the title is a reference to the town of Athens, Ontario.

== Reception ==
Writing in the Vancouver Sun, Alan Dawe positively reviewed it, saying that he "can contemplate with pleasure to the prospect of reading this novel again and again." David Helwig of the Toronto Star wrote that it is "humane, often charming, sometimes witty, lovingly detailed and full of a real generosity of spirit" but was "slacker in texture than its predecessor."
