= Leave It to Me =

Leave It To Me may refer to:

- Leave It to Me (1920 film), a 1920 American film by Emmett J. Flynn
- Leave It to Me (1930 film), a 1930 British film
- Leave It to Me (1933 film), a 1933 British film
- Leave It to Me (1937 film), a 1937 British film
- Leave It to Me (1955 film), a 1955 Czech film
- Leave It to Me!, a 1938 musical
- Leave It to Me (novel), a 1997 American novel
- "Leave It to Me" (song), the third single by Irish art rock quartet Director
