= Celebrity Studies =

- Discipline: Cultural studies
- Language: English
- Edited by: Erin Meyers and Alice Leppert

Publication details
- History: 2010–present
- Publisher: Routledge
- Frequency: Quarterly
- Open access: Hybrid
- License: CC BY-NC-ND or CC BY
- Impact factor: 0.9 (2021)

Standard abbreviations
- ISO 4: Celebr. Stud.

Indexing
- ISSN: 1939-2397 (print); 1939-2400 (web)
- LCCN: 2007214518
- OCLC no.: 156875338

Links
- Journal homepage; Online access; Online archive

Celebrity Studies is a quarterly peer-reviewed academic journal published by Routledge which focuses on the "critical exploration of celebrity, stardom and fame". Founded in 2010 by media studies academics Sean Redmond (University of Victoria) and Su Holmes (University of East Anglia), Celebrity Studies is the first scholarly journal dedicated to the study of celebrity. The debut of the journal reflects a growing scholarly interest in the field following the proliferation of research on celebrity since the 2000s. Upon its announcement, the journal was met with negative media and academic reception. The journal has since helped legitimize the study of celebrity and is regarded as the preeminent journal in its field. The Association of Learned and Professional Society Publishers (ALPSP) shortlisted Celebrity Studies for the Best New Journal award in 2011.

Notable studies published in the journal include analyses on Pippa Middleton's buttocks, the history and influence of "climate contrarians", and Meghan Markle's relationship with feminism. Special issues of the journal have been devoted to singers David Bowie and Michael Jackson, actor Keanu Reeves, and reality television series RuPaul's Drag Race. The journal also sponsors an international biennial conference. Prior conferences took place at universities in Melbourne, London, Amsterdam, and Rome. The journal's current editors-in-chief include Erin Meyers (Oakland University) and Alice Leppert (Ursinus College).

== History ==
=== Creation ===
The field of "celebrity studies" emerged in academia in the 2000s coinciding with a wave of celebrity in popular culture. Due to the recent proliferation of research on celebrity across academic disciplines, a scholarly consensus has emerged about its importance. The journal was started by Sean Redmond (University of Victoria) and Su Holmes (University of East Anglia) in 2010 and is published by Routledge. Redmond and Holmes are both media studies academics who, in 2006, published a review of recent debates about celebrity. Celebrity Studies is the first scholarly journal dedicated to the subject of celebrity. It was initially published three times per year.

In the inaugural issue of the journal, the co-editors noted that celebrity "exists at the core of many of the spaces, experiences and economies of modern life." Additionally, they wanted to remind readers that engaging with celebrity requires individuals "to defamiliarise the everyday" and thereby "make apparent the cultural politics and power relations which sit at the center of 'the taken for granted.'" Such a task of "uncovering and analyzing the systems and structures" of celebrity lies at the foundation of media, television, and cultural studies, according to the inaugural issue. Holmes also told the Times Higher Education that celebrity studies was "more central to understanding the everyday than maths, English or science".

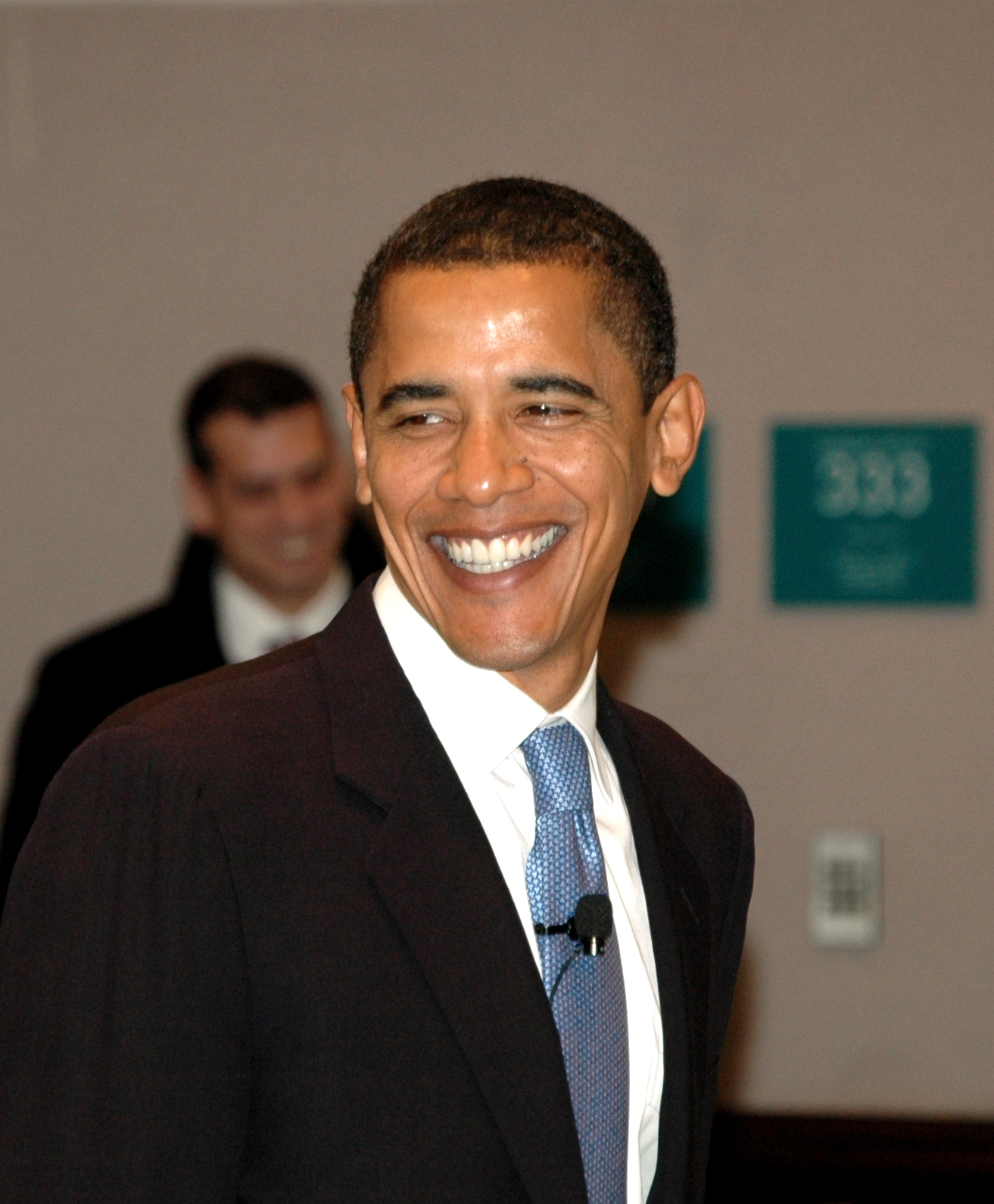
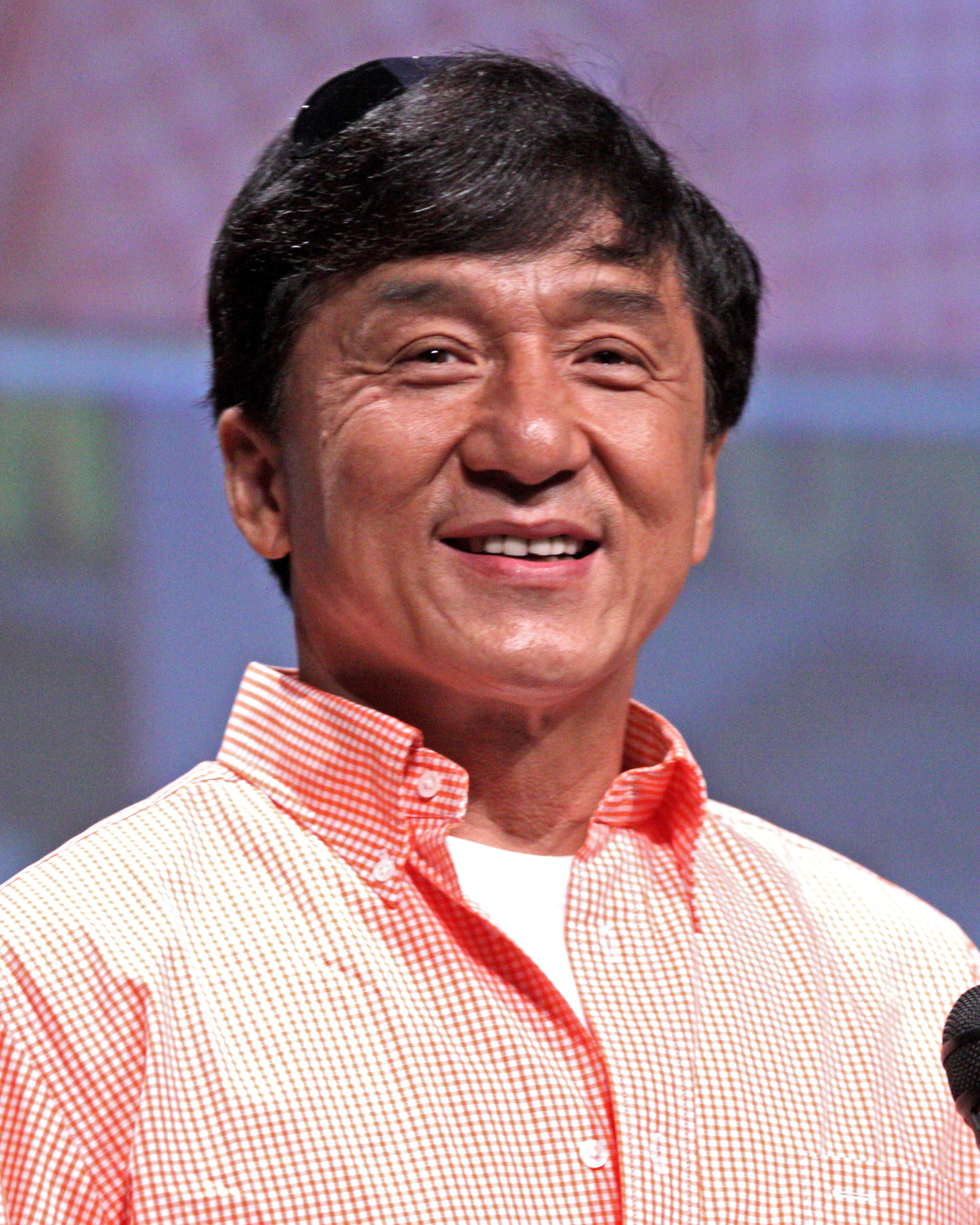
US President Barack Obama and actor Jackie Chan were both featured in the inaugural issue of Celebrity Studies.

One article in the inaugural issue authored by Redmond was titled "Avatar Obama in the Age of Liquid Celebrity". Redmond argued that US President Barack Obama is the "epitome of runniness" in an "era of disembedding without re-embedding." Another article explored actor Jackie Chan in relation to "ageing, race and masculinity in transnational action." Graeme Turner, Professor of Cultural Studies at the University of Queensland, was featured in the invitation-only first issue of the journal, where he explained why such a journal was needed and criticized the over-reliance of textual analysis in the field. Additionally, Turner issued a challenge to other academics that celebrity studies scholars do more than contribute to the "discursive regime surrounding celebrity" and instead "focus on its industrial production and audience consumption."

The aim of the journal is to address the "production, circulation and consumption of fame" in contemporary and historical contexts and provide a forum for debate. The first few issues of the journal concentrated almost entirely on current people and events. The journal draws upon a range of interdisciplinary approaches and explores the relevance of celebrity studies to other disciplines like sociology and political science. The journal's initial editorial board totaled 15 editors from British universities and universities abroad. Each journal issue features a book review section and a forum section dedicated to shorter essays, observations, and debates. By August 2018, the journal had published thirty issues.

Holmes stepped down as co-editor in 2019 and was replaced by Erin A. Meyers, who is an associate professor of communication at Oakland University. Alice Leppert, Associate Professor of Media and Communication Studies at Ursinus College, was named co-editor of the journal in 2020. Leppert had been involved with the journal since its inception and has written about subjects such as a Hong Kong film star, the cast of Friends, and reality TV.

=== Reception ===
While the announcement of the journal was met with negative media and academic reception, Celebrity Studies has since given the field institutional legitimacy and has helped raise the prestige of the field. The journal's debut reflects a growing scholarly interest in the discipline and the socio-political uses of fame. Sociologist Robert van Krieken has referred to the journal as a "treasure trove of innovative analyses of celebrity." Marc Abrahams, editor of the Annals of Improbable Research, wrote that the journal "has come to epitomise, if not utterly dominate, the entire academic field with which it shares a name." It is regarded as the preeminent or flagship journal in its field. In 2011, the journal was shortlisted by the Association of Learned and Professional Society Publishers (ALPSP) for the Best New Journal award.

Bioethicist Andy Miah, who founded the first celebrity culture conference in 2005, was not surprised of the launch of the journal because "celebrities have become a focal point of our value system which warrant our attention." Others were more dismissive of the journal during its launch. Australian public intellectual Germaine Greer opined that the journal would not survive three issues. British author and historian Graham McCann criticized the journal, saying that "academic findings of this sort are at best banal and at worst misleading." Matthew Bell of The Independent wrote that he expected to see the journal produce "plenty of pseudo-academic mumbo jumbo." Holmes and Redmond attributed the largely unfavorable media reaction of their journal to fears of "dumbing down" of higher education. Additionally, the editors believed the negative response can be attributed to the "perception that academia is 'frivolous and populist' because of the apparently 'low-brow' subject of its scholarship." Turner defended the reputation of the journal and the field, arguing it "isn't bullshit, this is stuff that actually is happening now."

=== Conference ===
Celebrity Studies sponsors an international conference every two years. The conference and the journal draw in a network of international media, film, and television scholars. The biennial conference began in 2012 and took place at Deakin University in Melbourne. In 2014, the conference was held at Royal Holloway, University of London. The conference debated the role of celebrities in society and discussed the impact of Hollywood, celebrity animals, and the influence of celebrity chefs. The 2014 conference was criticized by journalist Cathy Newman of Channel 4 News, who considered the argument that celebrities can make information more accessible was "bizarre, if not downright depressing," and opined that "Katy Perry can't our children anything about politics."

The third international conference occurred at the University of Amsterdam in June 2016. The subtitle of the conference was "Authenticating Celebrity." Over 200 experts were in attendance, most of whom were from the United States, the United Kingdom, and Australia. The conference addressed matters such as digital technology, celebrity politics, and "What makes a celebrity authentic?" At the conference, literary historian Lorraine York et al. presented their work on the Kardashian family. In 2018, the fourth international conference was held in Rome at La Sapienza University. The conference was entitled "Desecrating Celebrity." The fifth international conference was scheduled to take place at the University of Winchester but was cancelled as a result of the COVID-19 pandemic.

== Notable studies ==
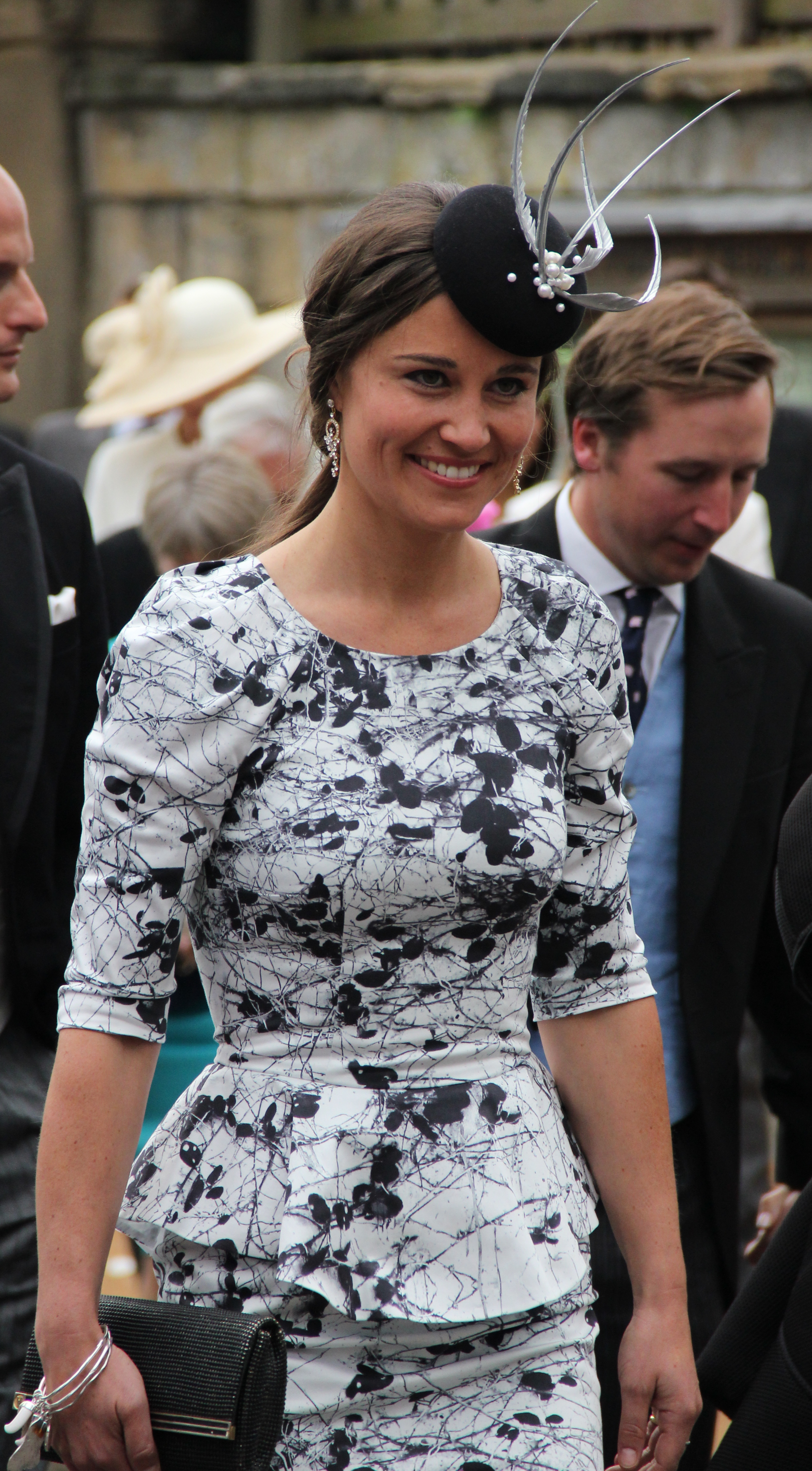
Pippa Middleton, younger sister of Catherine, Princess of Wales, had her buttocks analysed by researchers in the journal.

=== Pippa Middleton's buttocks ===
In November 2011, Janet McCabe, a scholar from the University of London, published an article in the journal that examined the role of Pippa Middleton's buttocks. McCabe wrote, "The celebrity of the Middleton curves has something important to tell us about celebrating the feminine ideal, which is compelling enough to psychically entangle us and from which we are not entirely able to free ourselves." A later study published in the journal examined Middleton's buttocks through Marxist and Freudian analyses.

=== Climate contrarians ===
A 2013 article traced the history of "climate contrarians" back to the 1980s. The authors identified "keystone species"—climate contrarians who have oversized voices in the media—and how such individuals "hold the ecosystem of climate denial together." These contrarians frequently label environmentalists as "communist, un-American fanatics" who are "diametrically opposed to prosperity, jobs, and profit," according to the study. The authors argued the "celebritisation of the climate" gives climate contrarians the ability to gain recognition in the public sphere, where their contributions are considered "balanced" in media debates on climate change.

=== Meghan, Duchess of Sussex ===
A 2018 critique by researchers Laura Clancy and Hannah Yelin published in the journal argued that the British monarchy had 'co-opted' the feminism of Meghan, Duchess of Sussex to enhance their public image. The researchers argued that before marrying Prince Harry, Markle was a vocal advocate for women's rights. According to the researchers, "Markle's activist voice has been either silenced or appropriated by the monarchy." Clancy and Yelin accused the monarchy of using Markle's "celebrity status to "re-legitimise" the Royal Family's male monarchical power." The researchers noted that Markle had quit her acting career and shut down her popular blog and social media accounts. The Royal Palace declined to comment on the study.

The Sunday Times wrote about the study under the headline "Meghan accused of dropping feminism like a hot potato". Clancy and Yelin criticized the headline as "problematically inaccurate", and Yelin later appeared on Sky News to explain the study was "not about scrutinising Markle herself and it's certainly not about policing anybody else's feminism." Clancy and Yelin stated they received accusations of sexism and racism and encountered various forms of harassment following the study's publication. They subsequently researched how academics more broadly experience the misrepresentation of their work in the media.

A study published in a special issue of Celebrity Studies examining actor Keanu Reeves in the John Wick franchise

=== Influencer marketing ===
A 2022 bibliometric analysis found that Khamis et al. (2017) had one of the most cited articles in Scopus in the realm of influencer marketing. The authors argued that "influencer marketing has emerged alongside the growth of digital technology, particularly social media, thereby creating an opportunity for brand marketing by what are termed social media influencers." Additionally, they argued that cultivating authenticity is a significant element of "micro-celebrity" which produces "a sense of realness that renders their narratives, their branding, both accessible and intimate."

=== Special issues ===
The journal regularly produces special thematic issues. Special issues have focused on subjects such as David Bowie and ageing. Following Michael Jackson's sudden death in 2009, the journal dedicated eight articles to the singer in its "Celebrity Forum" section. The special issue explored Jackson's death as a media event and the rituals of mourning and memorialisation associated with such an event. A 2012 special edition focused on the Olympics, where one article examined Australian diver Matthew Mitcham as a "gay sporting icon." In 2022, a special issue of the journal was devoted exclusively to Canadian actor Keanu Reeves. A call for papers requested topics such as "tragic Keanu"; "Keanu-as-meme"; Keanu as "reluctant celebrity"; and Keanu's relationship to "queer and Asian American identities."

Other special issues of the journal covered topics such as the TV series RuPaul's Drag Race, the 2011 royal wedding, celebrity biographies, and Asian stardom.

== Abstracting and indexing ==
The journal is indexed and abstracted in:

- Arts and Humanities Citation Index
- Current Contents/Arts & Humanities
- Current Contents/Social and Behavioral Sciences
- Modern Language Association Database
- Social Sciences Citation Index
- Scopus

According to the Journal Citation Reports, the journal has a 2024 impact factor of 0.9. Celebrity Studies was included in Excellence in Research for Australia's 2018 Journal List. The Norwegian Scientific Index classifies Celebrity Studies as a "Level 1" journal.

== See also ==
- Fan studies
- The Journal of Popular Culture
