= Peter O'Brien (writer) =

Canadian-American writer, editor, and artist

- Born: Thomas Peter O'Brien; August 29, 1957 (age 69); Port Chester, New York, U.S.
- Education: Vancouver College
- Alma mater: University of Notre Dame (BA); McGill University (MA)
- Occupations: Writer, artist, editor
- Known for: Cleopatra at the Breakfast Table, The Echo is Where, LOTS OF FUN WITH FINNEGANS WAKE
- Children: 1
- Website: https://tpob.me/

Thomas Peter O’Brien (born August 29, 1957), known professionally as Peter O’Brien, is a Canadian-American writer, editor, and artist. He has written or edited eleven books and has published essays, reviews, and interviews on literature and art.

== Early life and education ==
O’Brien was born in Port Chester, New York, and raised in Vancouver, British Columbia. He attended Vancouver College, earned a BA from the University of Notre Dame, and completed an MA at McGill University. He also studied at the School of Irish Studies in Dublin and at the Banff Centre for Arts and Creativity.

O'Brien grew up with nine siblings and twelve step-siblings. He wrote that his large family shaped his perspective as a writer: “There are a lot of ill-shaped, meandering, and conflicting stories in a family that size.”

== Career ==
=== Writing ===
O’Brien's books often explore themes of literature, art, and personal reflection. His works include:

- The Meister Effect (2022, Carbon Publishing)
- Love & Let Go: Reflections, Confessions, Encouragements, and a Few Cautionary Forewarnings from a Father to a Daughter (2022, Mosaic Press)
- Dream Visions: The Art of Alanis Obomsawin (2021, Perceval Press / Viggo Mortensen)
- A Perfect Offering: Personal Stories of Trauma and Transformation (2020, Mosaic Press) – co-edited with Harold Heft and Suzanne Heft.
- The Echo is Where (2019, Carbon Publishing).
- INNING: How the Toronto Blue Jays Inspired Us About Baseball and Life in 53 Error-Filled, Ecstatic, Epic Minutes (2016, Carbon Publishing).
- Cleopatra at the Breakfast Table: Why I Studied Latin with My Teenager and How I Discovered the Daughterland (2014, Forefront Editions, Quattro Books).
- Build a Better Book Club (1999, Macmillan Canada, with Harold Heft).
- Introduction to Literature: British, American, Canadian (1987, Harper & Row, with Robert Lecker and Jack David).
- So To Speak: Interviews with Contemporary Canadian Writers (1987, Véhicule Press).
- Fatal Recurrences: New Fiction in English from Montréal (1984, Véhicule Press, with Hugh Hood).

In A Perfect Offering, O’Brien and his co-editors collected first-person narratives from writers and artists including Paul Watson and Jennifer Finney Boylan. Writing in the National Post, Barbara Kay described the book as a reflection on trauma that “invites us to confront, and may even help us to overcome, our deepest fears.” In an article in the McGill News, Brenda Branswell notes that A Perfect Offering "is a collection of stories from 31 contributors – including Heft and O’Brien – about their own experiences with trauma. Powerful and poignant, they cover a range of harrowing life experiences."

In The Montreal Gazette, Joel Yanofsky reviews So To Speak, calling it a refreshingly random literary tour: "The random nature of the book is the most refreshing thing about it. O'Brien's intention was to provide a cross-section of literary voices – male and female, new and old, poet and storyteller – and let 'the traditions fall where they may.' So To Speak succeeds in doing that." Marc Coté, in The Globe and Mail, hoped that So To Speak would reach a wide audience: "Leon Rooke and Erín Moure come across wonderfully in their interviews. In both cases the interviewer/letter-writer, Peter O'Brien, was well-matched with the authors. Not only do intellect and dedication to their craft come across, but so does a good sense of humour – something most writers have which is often not recognized."

=== Journals and Periodicals ===
O’Brien has published essays, reviews, articles, and interviews in The Globe and Mail, The Fortnightly Review, Montreal Gazette, and Interior Design. He has also edited several Canadian literary periodicals, founding and serving as editor-in-chief of Rubicon (1983–88) and later co-editing Descant (1989–93).

== Artwork ==
O’Brien is also a visual artist. His ongoing ten-year project, LOTS OF FUN WITH FINNEGANS WAKE, involves annotating, illustrating, and reinterpreting the 628 pages of James Joyce’s Finnegans Wake. He has described it as “a form of intellectual folk art.”

In a review of O’Brien's work in the James Joyce Quarterly, Kaitlin Thurlow wrote that his pages combine typography, collage, and drawing to create “personal pastiches” that bridge multiple disciplines.

Margot Norris, Chancellor's Professor Emerita at the University of California, Irvine, says about O'Brien's multi-year project: "The labor and skill and imagination that went into taking the words of the Wake and transforming them into something so wildly and beautifully new gives it a more intense depth than I've seen in any other painting or visual art."

The project has been exhibited in Antwerp, Hong Kong, Montreal, New York, and Toronto, and selections have appeared in journals such as Art/Research International, The Fortnightly Review, James Joyce Quarterly, and World Literature Today.
