= A New Athens =

A New Athens may refer to:

- A New Athens (novel), 1977, by Hugh Hood
- A New Athens (album), 2010, by The Bluetones

== See also ==
- New Athens (disambiguation)
