= Jasmine Sealy =

Barbadian writer

- Occupation: Writer
- Notable work: The Island of Forgetting
- Awards: Amazon Canada First Novel Award

Jasmine Sealy is a British-born, Barbadian-Canadian writer based in Vancouver, British Columbia. Her debut novel, The Island of Forgetting, won the Amazon Canada First Novel Award in 2023.

== Life ==
Sealy was born in the United Kingdom and grew up in Barbados. She moved to Canada at age eighteen to study international development and has lived there ever since.

== Career ==
Sealy graduated from the master's program in creative writing at the University of British Columbia. In 2020, the short story she wrote as her master's thesis, "A Fair Wind to Take You Home", was the winner of the UBC/HarperCollins Best New Fiction Prize.

Sealey's first novel, The Island of Forgetting, was based on that short story. It was published in 2022. Set in Barbados and Canada, and spanning sixty years, it is narrated by four different members of the same family haunted by a traumatic incident. The story draws on Greek mythology, and the major characters are named after Greek mythological figures. In 2023, the novel won the Amazon Canada First Novel Award, was longlisted for the OCM Bocas Prize for Caribbean Literature, and shortlisted for the Kobo Emerging Writer Prize.

Sealey has published short stories in Canadian literary magazines including The New Quarterly, Room, and Prairie Fire. In 2017, her story "Strata" was longlisted for the CBC Short Story Prize and "Hot Pot" was shortlisted for the Commonwealth Short Story Prize. In 2021, her story "Collapse", first published in Room, was included in Best Canadian Stories 2021. In 2023, she was named one of the ten winners of the Journey Prize, in a special edition devoted to new Black Canadian writers. Her story "Collapse" appeared again in the prize anthology, The Journey Prize Stories 33, together with "Caves", first published in Prairie Fire.

Sealy has been prose editor at Prism International, taught creative writing at Capilano University, and been writer-in-residence at the University of British Columbia School of Creative Writing and Langara College.

== Awards ==
Year	Work	Award	Category	Result	Ref
2023	The Island of Forgetting	Amazon Canada First Novel Award	—	Won	
2023	The Island of Forgetting	Kobo Emerging Writer Prize	Literary Fiction	Shortlisted	
2023	The Island of Forgetting	OCM Bocas Prize for Caribbean Literature	Fiction	Longlisted	

== Bibliography ==
- —— (2022). The Island of Forgetting. Toronto: Harper Avenue. ISBN 9781443465212.
