= W. D. Valgardson =

Icelandic-Canadian fiction writer, poet, and academic

- Born: 7 May 1939 (age 87); Winnipeg, Manitoba, Canada
- Occupations: Novelist, short story writer, poet
- Notable work: Bloodflowers: Ten Stories (1973)

William Dempsey Valgardson (born 7 May 1939) is an Icelandic-Canadian fiction writer and poet. He was a long-time professor of writing at the University of Victoria in British Columbia.

His writing often focuses on cultural differences and involve irony and symbolism. His short stories involve normal people in normal situations, who, under certain circumstances, lead unusual and surprising lives.

Valgardson has won numerous awards and accolades including the Ethel Wilson Fiction Prize for The Girl With the Botticelli Face (1992) and the Books in Canada First Novel Award for Gentle Sinners (1980). His short story "Bloodflowers" was included in Best American Short Stories 1971, while "Trees" is listed in the 1977 issue of Best Canadian Stories.

== Biography ==
Valgardson was born 7 May 1939 in Winnipeg, Manitoba to parents Dempsey Alfred Herbert, a fisherman of Icelandic descent, and Rachel Iris Valgardson. He was raised in Gimli, Manitoba, a community with a large Icelandic population. This upbringing greatly impacted his personal life perspective, as well as his future writing.

He received a Bachelor of Arts degree from the University of Manitoba in 1960, followed by a Bachelor of Education in 1966. Three years later, he received a Master of Fine Arts from the University of Iowa after attending the Iowa Writers' Workshop.

Between his degree programs, Valgardson taught English in various schools across rural Manitoba; after receiving his master's degree, he taught English at Cottey College. During this time, he began writing and publishing, with his first short story collection, Bloodflowers: Ten Stories, coming out in 1973.

Valgardson began teaching writing at the University of Victoria in 1974.

== Novels ==
- Gentle Sinners, Oberon Press, 1980
- The Girl With the Botticelli Face, Douglas & McIntyre, 1992
- In Valhalla's Shadows, Douglas & McIntyre, 2019

== Short stories ==
- Bloodflowers: Ten Stories, short stories - Oberon Press, 1973
- The Job, Anthology, Toronto, CBC radio
- God is Not a Fish Inspector, short stories - Oberon Press, 1975
- "Trees" - In 77: Best Canadian Stories,, ed. by Joan Harcourt & John Metcalf, 23-36. Kingston, ON: Oberon Press, 1977.
- Red Dust, short stories - Oberon Press, 1978
- What Can't Be Changed Shouldn't Be Mourned, short stories, Douglas & McIntyre, 1990
- What The Bear Said: Skald tales from New Iceland, folk tales from Lake Winnipeg - Turnstone Press, 2011

== Radio and film ==
- Beyond Normal Requirements, Anthology, Toronto, CBC radio, 1977
- God is Not a Fish Inspector, film Allan Kroeker, Dept.of Education, Manitoba, 1980.
- The Burning, CBC Radio, Vancouver, 1981
- Bloodflowers, Stereo Sound Stage, CBC radio, Toronto, Oct. 30, 1982
- The Pedlar, based on "A Place of One's Own", film Directed by: Allan Kroeker Produced by: Michael Scott 1982, 54 min 32 s
- Gentle Sinners, CBC film 105 min, Director: Eric Till, 1983
- Bloodflowers, Sundary Matinee, Toronto, CBC radio, March 6, 1983
- Granite Point, Saturday Stereo Theatre, Toronto, CBC radio, Oct. 29 1983
- The Cave, Vanishing Point, Toronto CBC Radio, Dec. 28, 1985
- An Unacceptable Standard of Cockpit Practice Disasters, CBC radio, Vancouver, 1985
- Sælir eru einfaldir, Icelandic National Radio, Reykjavik, Iceland, May 3–31, 1985
- Bloðrot Icelandic National Radio, Reykjavik, Iceland, July 27, 1986
- Carpenter of Dreams, Sextet, Sunday Matinee, CBC Radio, Feb. 15, 1987
- Seiche State of the Arts, CBC Radio, Jan. 10, 1987
- Ukrainian Journey, Morningside, CBC Radio, Jan. 22–26, 5 parts, 1987
- The Man From Snaefellsness, Stereo Theatre, CBC Radio, (2 hour drama), Oct. 6, 13, 1991
- Wrinkles, Arts Encounters, CBC Radio, Winnipeg, 1991
- The Girl With The Botticelli Face, On The Arts, CBC Radio, April 18, 25, 1994
- The Man Who Was Always Running Out of Toilet Paper, Icelandic National Radio, Reykjavik, Iceland, trans Solveig Jonsdóttir, Sept., 1994
- The Girl with the Botticelli Face, The Australian Broadcasting Corporation, Nov. 10, 17 Nov. 11, 18, 1994
- Ingibjorg's Christmas Gift performed by the Inuvik Choral and Theatrical Society, CBC North Radio, Dec. 18, 19, 20, 1995
- A Matter of Balance, CBC Radio, Toronto, 1999
- Í Manitoba, Utvarp Reykjavik, Rikis Utvarpid, Reykjavik, Iceland June 11, 1977
- Blóðrót, islensk þýðing Guðrúnar Guðmundsdóttir, ásamt inngangi eftir Harald Bessason—Kópavogi:Sigmar Þormar, 1989.
- The Girl With The Botticelli Face, Between The Covers, CBC, Toronto, Oct. 4–22, 1993

== Poetry ==
- In The Gutting Shed, poetry - Turnstone Press, 1976
- The Carpenter of Dreams, poetry - Skaldhus Press, c1986

== Books for young people ==
- Frances, novel - Groundwood, 2002
- Thor, children's picture book, illustrated by Ange Zhang - Groundwood, 1994
- The Hockey Fan - 1st ed. -- Victoria [B.C.] : Published for the Hawthorne Society by Reference West, c1994
- Winter Rescue, illustrated by Ange Zhang. 1st U.S. ed. 1995. -- New York : Margaret K. McElderry Books, 1995, c1994.
- Sarah and the People of Sand River children's picture book, illustrations by Ian Wallace - Groundwood, 1996
- Thor, teikningar eftir Ange Zhang; Guðrun B. Guðsteinsdóttir, Íslenkaði—Seltjarnarnes [Iceland]: Ormstunga, 1996
- Garbage Creek and Other Stories, short stories - Groundwood, 1997
- The Divorced Kids Club, short stories - Groundwood, 1998
