= The Swing in the Garden =

1975 novel by Hugh Hood

- First edition
- Author: Hugh Hood
- Cover artist: Louis de Niverville
- Language: English
- Series: The New Age series
- Publisher: Oberon Press
- Publication date: 1975
- Publication place: Canada
- Media type: Print
- Pages: 326 pages
- Followed by: A New Athens

The Swing in the Garden, first published in 1975 by Oberon, is a novel by Canadian author Hugh Hood and the first in his ambitious 12-novel cycle, The New Age. It is followed by A New Athens.

== Plot and setting ==
This first book in the New Age series deals with narrator Matt Goderich's childhood and formative years growing up in Toronto and Jackson's Point, Ontario in the 1930s. The family lives in the idyllic Summerville neighborhood until his father Andrew, a confirmed socialist, loses his job as a university professor for political reasons. Andrew Goderich then purchases the Lazy Bay Grill in Jackson's Point and the family runs this business for some time, eventually running out of money because they are overstaffed and are too kind to let anyone go. Later they manage a ramshackle hotel, the Lakeview, on the Toronto Islands.

== Themes ==
Hood's observational style and attention to detail bring to life a 1930s Ontario in the midst of dramatic social change. Canada is slowly growing away from the United Kingdom and developing ever-closer ties with the United States. In Toronto, strongly felt class structures divide neighborhoods hard-hit by the Depression, while in the surrounding area, pristine forest is turned into cottage country for the increasingly wealthy Toronto elites. As the clouds of World War II loom on the horizon, the narrator and Canada itself both struggle through growing pains in their search for an identity.

== Reception ==
The Ottawa Citizen gave a mixed review, criticizing the characters and plot, but praising the use of allegories and "frequent elegancies of style".
