= Ray Smith (author) =

Canadian writer (1941–2019)

Ray Smith, born James Raymond Smith, (1941–2019) was a Canadian novelist and short story writer. He was born on 12 December 1941 in Cape Breton (Inverness, Nova Scotia) and educated at Dalhousie University, Halifax (B.A. 1963), and at Concordia University, Montreal (M.A. 1985). He worked as an instructor in English at Dawson College, Montreal, until his retirement in 2007. In the early 1970s, he joined with authors Clark Blaise, Raymond Fraser, Hugh Hood, and John Metcalf to form the celebrated Montreal Story Tellers Fiction Performance Group.

Smith's works include the novels Lord Nelson Tavern (McClelland & Stewart, 1974), A Night at the Opera (Porcupine's Quill, 1992), which won the 1992 QSPELL Hugh MacLennan Award for Best Novel, and The Man Who Loved Jane Austen (Porcupine's Quill, 1999). He has also published the short story collections Cape Breton Is the Thought Control Centre of Canada (Anansi Press, 1969) and Century His short fiction has also appeared in numerous anthologies.

In 2007, he published The Flush of Victory: Jack Bottomly Among the Virgins.

In August 2010, literary critics Alex Good and Stephen W. Beattie included Smith in their list of the ten most underrated writers in Canada, published on the National Post's website.

He died at his home in Mabou on 20 June 2019.
