= Murray Auto Group =

Murray Automotive Group
- Industry: Automotive retail
- Key people: Clair Murray (Chairman); Doug Murray (CEO); Arthur Fast (CFO)
- Number of employees: 800+
- Divisions: Chevrolet, Buick, Cadillac, GMC, Hyundai
- Website: Murray Automotive Group

In 1926 A.A (Andy) Murray began to sell Star, Essex and Hudson cars from his agricultural implements business in Souris, Manitoba. By 1934 Andy had expanded his operation to include the General Motors line, which was to become one of the world’s largest automobile manufacturers. Over the decades the business has continued to grow and has now evolved into a group that consists of 30 Canadian dealerships from coast to coast. Today, The Murray Automotive Group has over 1,500 employees and sells nearly 15,000 vehicles each year. Claire’s sons, Doug, Paul, Dan and Chris are 3rd generation Murray’s in the business. The automotive group continues to expand into the 4th generation.

== History ==
=== Abbotsford ===
In May 2003 Hall Pontiac Buick GMC in Abbotsford, British Columbia was purchased by the Murray Automotive Group and became Murray Pontiac Buick GMC. In June 2007 Abbotsford Motorcade, Abbotsford's Chevrolet Cadillac dealership, was purchased by the Group and became Murray Chevrolet Cadillac. By mid-2008, the two dealerships were granted permission by General Motors to combine operations at the Murray Chevrolet Cadillac site in the Fraser Valley Automall and became Murray Chevrolet Cadillac Pontiac Buick GMC (commonly referred to as Murray GM - Abbotsford). Stocking a large inventory of both new and used vehicles, they service the Fraser Valley and Lower Mainland areas of British Columbia.

In 2010, 2011 and 2012, the dealership was given first place balloting in the Abbotsford Times Readers Choice Award as Abbotsford's Best New Car/Truck Dealership.

In July 2013, Murray Kia in Abbotsford opened in the Fraser Valley Automall next door to Murray GM.

=== Yarmouth ===
In April 2008 Yarmouth Motormart in Yarmouth, Nova Scotia as well as its satellite location in Barrington, Nova Scotia was acquired by the Murray Automotive Group. These two dealerships marked the Murray Auto Group's first acquisitions in Eastern Canada. The two locations which were being operated by Pat Sullivan since the death of her husband Chris Sullivan, were renamed "Murray GM Yarmouth & Barrington". The new managing partner is Jeff Little, a 15-year General Motors of Canada employee.

In September 2014 an announcement was made that Jeff Little & the Murray Automotive Group will be bringing the Dodge, Chrysler Jeep and Ram brands to Yarmouth with a new Murray Dodge dealership. The new store is scheduled to open early 2015.

=== Leduc ===
Murray Chevrolet in Leduc, Alberta joined the Murray Automotive Group in August 2008. It dealt largely in trucks due to the large number of oil and farm businesses nearby. In June 2009 General Motors filed for Chapter 11 bankruptcy, and as part of the restructuring plan it chose to not renew its sales and service agreements with 245 Canadian dealerships. Leduc received its termination letter in spring 2009, although having planned to keep their doors open until October 2010, they received an offer for the property and decided to sell. They closed their doors November 30, 2009.

== Awards and Distinctions ==
=== Canada's 50 Best Managed Companies ===
The Murray Automotive Group was awarded Platinum status in 2009. This distinction is only given to businesses that qualify for Best Managed for a minimum of 6 consecutive years.

=== Canada's top 100 employers ===
In 2005 the Murray Automotive Group was selected by Mediacorp Canada Inc. as one of Canada's Top 100 Employers.
