= New Athens =

New Athens may refer to several places:

- New Athens, Illinois, United States
- New Athens, Ohio, United States
- New Athens (Nouvelle Athènes), an area of the 9th arrondissement of Paris, France

New Athens is also the English name of Nowe Ateny, the first Polish-language encyclopedia.

== See also ==
- A New Athens (disambiguation)
