= White Figure, White Ground =

1964 novel by Hugh Hood

- First edition
- Author: Hugh Hood
- Original title: White Figure, White Ground
- Cover artist: Martin Handweiler
- Language: English
- Publisher: Ryerson Press
- Publication date: 1964
- Publication place: Canada
- Media type: Print
- Pages: 246 pages
- Followed by: The Camera Always Lies

White Figure, White Ground is the first novel by Canadian author Hugh Hood. It was first published in 1964 by Ryerson Press. One of the main themes in the novel surrounds libertinism, as the main character attempts to distinguish between libertinism which he despises and an acknowledgment of his sexual being. The story is about a painter, Alexander McDonald heading for international fame returns to his childhood home in Nova Scotia to confront his memories through his painting.

== Plot and setting ==
The novel is set in Nova Scotia, Montreal and New York City during the early 1960s. Alexander MacDonald, a talented young Canadian painter raised in Toronto but now based out of Montreal, travels with his wife Madeleine to his father's ancestral hometown of Barringford (based on Barrington, Nova Scotia) in search of inspiration for his increasingly sought-after paintings. He becomes acquainted with long-lost relatives and attempts to solve the mystery of his father's sudden departure from the town decades earlier.
