= Darkness (short story collection) =

- Author: Bharati Mukherjee
- Publisher: Penguin Books
- Publication date: 1985
- Media type: Hardcover & Paperback
- Pages: 171
- ISBN: 0-140-07930-0
- OCLC: 25807164
- Preceded by: Wife (novel) (1975)
- Followed by: The Middleman and Other Stories (1988)

Darkness (1985) is a collection of short stories by Bharati Mukherjee.

== Contents ==
Story	Originally published in
"Angela"	Mother Jones
"The Lady from Lucknow"	Missouri Review
"The World According to Hsü"	Chatelaine
"A Father"	
"Isolated Incidents"	Saturday Night
"Nostalgia"	
"Tamurlane"	The Canadian Forum
"Hindus"	
"Saints"	Three Penny Review
"Visitors"	
"The Imaginary Assassin"	
"Courtly Vision"	
