= Desirable Daughters =

2002 novel by Bharati Mukherjee

- First edition cover
- Author: Bharati Mukherjee
- Language: English
- Genre: Historical novel
- Publisher: Hyperion / Theia
- Publication date: March 2002
- Publication place: United States
- Media type: Print (hardback & paperback)
- Pages: 310 pp (hardback edition) & 320 pp (paperback edition)
- ISBN: 0-7868-6598-9 (hardback edition) & ISBN 0-7868-8515-7 (paperback edition)
- OCLC: 47927759
- Dewey Decimal: 813/.54 21
- LC Class: PR9499.3.M77 D47 2002
- Preceded by: Leave It to Me
- Followed by: The Tree Bride

Desirable Daughters (2002) is the first in a trilogy of novels by American-Canadian Bharati Mukherjee which includes The Tree Bride (2004), followed by Miss New India (2011). The book was originally published by Hyperion / Theia.

== Plot ==
The novel is told from the point of view of the protagonist, Tara Bhattacharjee, the youngest of three desirable Bengali sisters. The three hail from a prosperous and urbane Calcutta family and are "raised according to the genteel social conventions and hallowed domestic traditions of India."

Tara compares her life and the life of her family, past and present, with a direct ancestor named Tara Lata. The modern Tara says about her ancient ancestor, "Tara Lata Gangooly had turned the tragedy of her husband's death and a lifetime's virginity into a model of selfless saintliness."

However, the modern Tara sees her life as perhaps the opposite of selflessness. She moved with her husband to Silicon Valley. Then, Tara jettisoned the mores, ethics and beliefs of her upbringing. She is divorced, has a live-in boyfriend, and retains custody of her completely acculturated son.

In contrast, the oldest sister, Padma, has become the perfect representative of the expatriate, ardently retaining her Indian identity in New Jersey. Parvati, the middle sister, has stayed in India and leads an affluent family lifestyle. She believes in the traditional Indian values with which she was raised. She begs Tara not to let herself become Americanized.

Hence, the novel explores the themes of identity, culture, and family. It is a story about the challenges of living between and the ways of relating to two vastly different cultures.
