= The Holder of the World =

1993 novel by Bharati Mukherjee

- First edition (US)
- Author: Bharati Mukherjee
- Language: English
- Publisher: Alfred A. Knopf (US); Chatto and Windus (UK)
- Publication date: September 1993
- Publication place: United States
- Media type: Print (hardback & paperback)
- Pages: 286 pp
- ISBN: 0-394-58846-0
- OCLC: 27641604
- Dewey Decimal: 813/.54 20
- LC Class: PR9499.3.M77 H65 1993
- Preceded by: Jasmine
- Followed by: Leave It to Me

The Holder of the World (1993) is a novel by Bharati Mukherjee. It is a retelling of Nathaniel Hawthorne's 1850 novel The Scarlet Letter, placing the story in two centuries (17th and 20th). The novel involves time travel via virtual reality, locating itself in 20th-century Boston, 17th-century Colonial America, and 17th-century Mughal-ruled India during the spread of the British East India Company. It also references Thomas Pynchon's novel, V.. The Holder of the World was among the contenders in a 2014 list by The Telegraph of the 10 all-time greatest Asian novels

== Publication history ==
- Hardcover — ISBN 0-394-58846-0 (ISBN 978-0-394-58846-9), published in September 1993 by Alfred A. Knopf.
- Paperback — ISBN 0-449-90966-2 (ISBN 978-0-449-90966-9), published in September 1994 by Random House
