= Maggie Helwig =

Canadian writer, social justice activist, and Anglican priest

The Reverend Canon Maggie Helwig
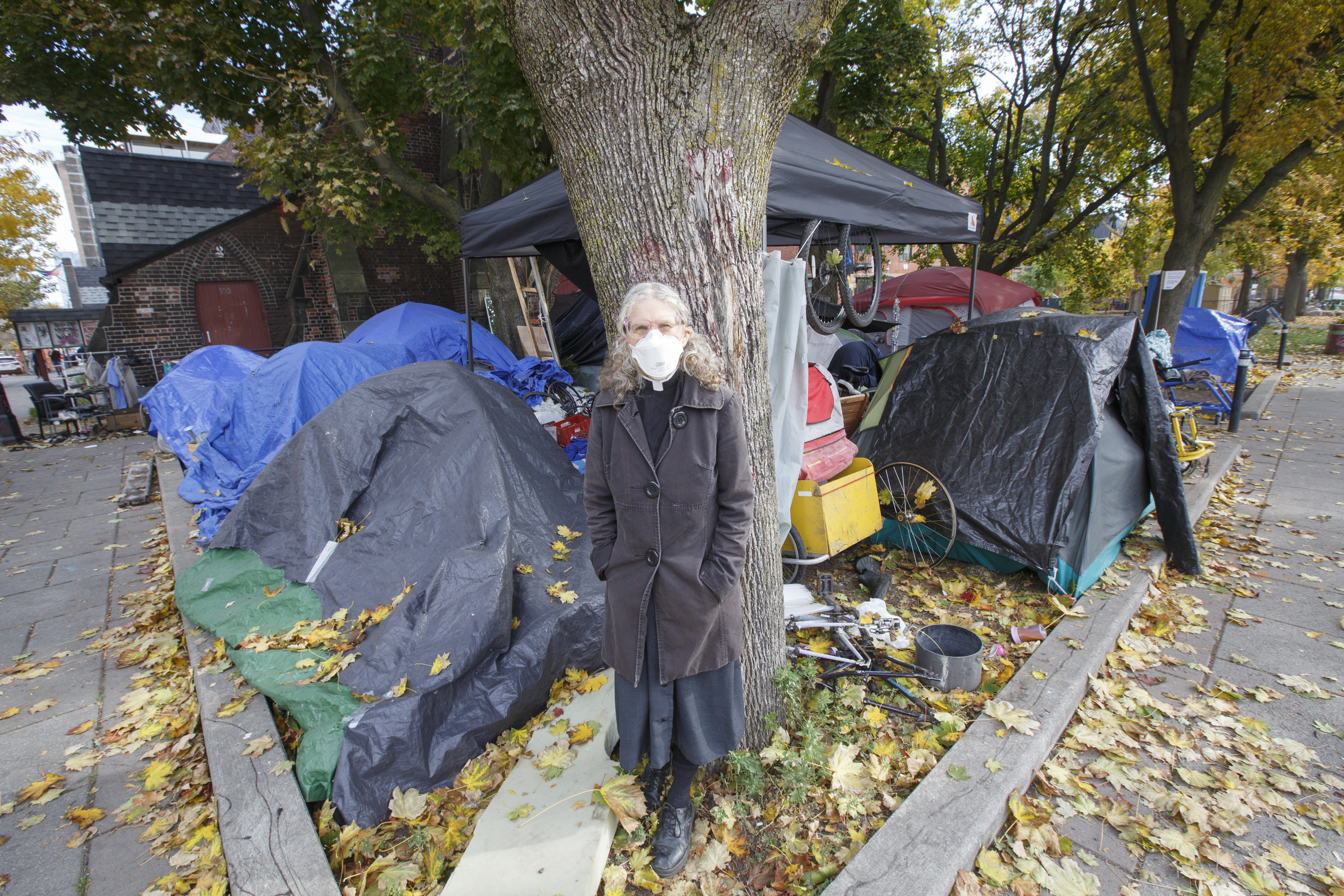
- Maggie Helwig at the encampment outside St. Stephens
- Born: 1961 (age 64–65); Wallasey, England
- Education: Trent University; Trinity College, Toronto
- Occupations: Cleric; novelist; poet; social activist
- Parent: David Helwig
- Writing career
- Language: English
- Period: 1981–present

Ecclesiastical career
- Religion: Christianity (Anglican)
- Church: Anglican Church of Canada
- Ordained: 2011 (deacon); 2012 (priest)
- Congregations served: Church of St Stephen-in-the-Fields, Toronto
- Website: maggiehelwig.com

Maggie Helwig (born 1961) is a Canadian poet, novelist, social justice activist, and Anglican priest.

== Academic career ==
Her early education was at Kingston Collegiate and Vocational Institute in Kingston, Ontario, graduating in 1979, then at Trent University in Peterborough, Ontario, where she graduated with honours with a Bachelor of Arts degree in 1983.

After reading for a Master of Divinity degree and serving as co-Head of Divinity at Trinity College, Toronto, she was ordained to the transitional diaconate in the Anglican Church of Canada at St. Paul's, Bloor Street, Toronto on 1 May 2011, and subsequently to the priesthood on 22 January 2012. On 27 November 2021, she was appointed an honorary Canon of St James' Cathedral, Toronto.

== Bibliography ==
Helwig's first novel, Where She Was Standing, is about the murder of a Canadian in Timor-Leste. Her second novel, Between Mountains, is a love story about a London-based Canadian journalist and a Serbian Albanian interpreter from Paris that endures the hardships that occurred during the war. The novel juxtaposes love and war within the characters while bringing about justice and truth.

Her third novel, Girls Fall Down, 2008, was shortlisted for the 2009 Toronto Book Awards. It won the Toronto Public Library's One Book Toronto in 2012. Jason McBride, writing in Toronto Life, described it as being "smart, suspenseful and compassionate." Finally, in a book review by Greg Doran, the novel is described as the narrator having a significant relationship with the "urban environment and the human spirit."

She has also co-edited many anthologies of Canadian fiction and poetry, with collaborators including Bronwen Wallace, Douglas Glover, Mark Anthony Jarman and her father, David Helwig.

== Activism ==
Helwig has been involved in social activist groups such as TAPOL, the East Timor Alert Network, and the International Federation for East Timor which campaigned against the Indonesian occupation of East Timor. She has also worked with the Women in Black network, particularly during the Balkan wars of the 1990s. She was also a well known advocate for Toronto's branch of the Occupy Wall Street movement, and was one of three clergy from different denominations ticketed for setting up a chapel at the Occupy Toronto "re-occupation" camp on May 1, 2012.

In 2022, on behalf of the Church of Saint Stephen-in-the-Fields, Helwig filed an interlocutory injunction request to prohibit the City of Toronto from removing a homeless encampment located alongside the Church on City of Toronto property. This request was denied by the Ontario Superior Court of Justice, and the encampment was partially removed by the City in 2023. Helwig wrote her 2025 book Encampment: Resistance, Grace, and an Unhoused Community, winner of the 2025 Toronto Book Award, on this topic. The remainder of the encampment survived in a precarious situation in the following years, facing a series of violation notices from the City. It was forcibly cleared by the City in October 2025 following an order from Toronto Fire Services.

In 2026, she won the Shaughnessy Cohen Prize for Political Writing for Encampment: Resistance, Grace, and an Unhoused Community.

== Personal life ==
Born in the United Kingdom, Helwig is the daughter of prominent Canadian writer David Helwig and theatre director and actor Nancy Helwig of Kingston, Ontario. She is married to editor Ken Simons and has one daughter.

== Works ==
=== Poetry ===
- Walking Through Fire, 1981
- Tongues of Men and Angels (Oberon Press, 1985) ISBN 9780887505843
- Eden, 1987
- Because the Gunman, 1987
- Talking Prophet Blues (Quarry Press, 1989) ISBN 9780919627239
- Graffiti for J.J. Harper, 1991
- Eating Glass, 1994
- The City on Wednesday, 1996
- One Building In the Earth: New and Selected Poems (2002) ISBN 9781550225525

=== Fiction ===
- Gravity Lets You Down, 1997 (short fiction)
- Where She Was Standing, 2001
- Between Mountains (2004) ISBN 9780676976298
- Girls Fall Down, 2008

=== Essays ===
- Apocalypse Jazz (1993) ISBN 9780887509254
- Real Bodies, 2002

=== Non-fiction ===
- Encampment: Resistance, Grace, and an Unhoused Community (2025) ISBN 9781552455043
- Instructions for the End of the World: Homilies of Comfort and Resistance (2026) ISBN 9781552455210

== See also ==
- Canadian literature
- Canadian poetry
- List of Canadian poets
