= The Sorrow and the Terror =

1987 book by Clark Blaise and Bharati Mukherjee

- First edition
- Author: Clark Blaise; Bharati Mukherjee
- Language: English
- Genre: Non-fiction
- Publisher: Viking Books
- Publication date: 1987

The Sorrow and the Terror: The Haunting Legacy of the Air India Tragedy is a 1987 book by Clark Blaise and Bharati Mukherjee about the Air India Flight 182 bombing in 1985. It was published by Viking Books. Both authors are naturalized Canadians; Mukherjee is an Indo-Canadian Hindu who was born an Indian citizen while Blaise was born an American citizen.

In May 1987, Terry Glavin of the Vancouver Sun said that The Sorrow and the Terror was only one of two books on the subject, with the other The Death of Air India Flight 182 by Salim Jiwa.

== Background ==
The authors said that the perception that AI182 was not a "Canadian tragedy" prompted them to write the book. They said that the book is a "citizen's inquiry" done out of "moral witness", and is not journalism nor sensationalism.

The authors used contacts in California, Europe, India, and Japan for their research. Government officials from Canada and India had spoken with the two authors. The authors conducted interviews of relatives of the deceased. Other persons who spoke with Mukherjee and Blaise included Sikhs of both political orientations (in regards to whether they were in favor of Khalistan, a proposed separate state out of current India) as well as doctors, engineers, journalists, lawyers, and scholars. The two authors conducted research trips to Canada, Ireland, and the United States. Within Canada they visited Montreal, Toronto, and Vancouver, and within the United States they visited Detroit. For research purposes the authors reviewed transcripts and attended trials. Glavin wrote that The Sorrow and the Terror "appears to have borrowed [research materials] heavily from" The Death of Air India Flight 182.

== Contents ==
The book has six parts and a glossary of terms related to India and South Asia. The first part discusses the lead-up to the bombing and the bombing itself. The second part discusses the salvage operation and the initial speculation that the crash was intentional. Part 3 discusses some of the passengers on the plane. Part 4 discusses the analysis of the bodies and the aircraft debris. Part 5 discusses the role of Canada in the dispute between Sikhs and Hindus.

The authors criticize Canadian society for not recognizing the AI182 crash as a Canadian issue and instead as "an ethnic tragedy". Glavin said that Blaise and Mukherjee "admit they reveal little that hasn't been reported in the press".

Gilbert Drolet, the author of a review of this book published in the Canadian Literature, wrote that the book "tends to occasional confusion" due to the "labyrinthine complications" of the legal, historical, and religious aspects. In regards to the theory behind who committed the bombing, he said "Much of the evidence proffered in ascribing blame is regrettably based on shallow research often yielding little more than conjecture and allegation, and yet to call these accusations spurious would be unfair for the truth must lie there somewhere beneath the avalanche of facts surrounding the incident." Drolet criticized the inclusion of detail in the discussion of the injuries to the passengers.

Zuhair Kashmeri of The Globe and Mail wrote that one reading "exquisitely penned chapters about the victims is like encountering tombstones during a walk through the woods, the inscriptions moving one to tears." Drolet argued that the "book's saving graces" are the "personal reminiscences by some of the parents" and the "moving account" of the Irish assistance of the AI182 families.

=== Sikh-Hindu relations ===
The book argued that the Air India attack was generally an attack on Sikhs against Hindus. In particular the book has a positive reception to the Hindus, who mostly resided in Ontario, and a negative reception towards religious Sikhs, who mostly resided in British Columbia.

The book argued that due to immigration policies of the 1960s through the 1970s, the Canadian government allowed persons who were unable to integrate into Canadian culture, and that Canadian government had neglected admitting educated persons in favor of religious extremists in its immigration system. Blaise said that the AI182 bombing exposed a negative aspect of Canada's multiculturalism, and that in regards to Sikh terrorism, "We are not talking of Sikhs and Hindus but of a political situation that has decayed into terrorism."

Frank Jones, a columnist of the Toronto Star accused the book of "tarring all Sikhs with the same brush" and "Hindu chauvinism"; he added that it was not appropriate to blame Canadian government policies because they would not have affected the political conflict in the Punjab. Malcolm McNeil of The Canadian Press wrote that "Canadian Sikhs will have some justification for feeling they receive less than even-handed treatment in this book." Charlie Smith of The Georgia Straight argued that this conclusion differed from that of the documentary Air India 182, which said that there were Sikh victims along with Hindu ones. McNeil added that there is no "forceful voice from the Sikh community" in this book and that it is a "serious omission".

Jones argued that "For the most part they give an even-handed account of the conflicts within the Sikh community" and that many moderate Sikhs had received physical attacks from more extremist Sikhs. Drolet said that the authors fail to consistently use the "feeble and sotto voce attempt to distinguish clearly between Khalistanis and moderate Sikhs" and therefore "they perhaps unwittingly perpetuate the increasingly accepted image of all Sikhs as wild-eyed fanatics honouring izzat".

== Legacy ==
Christopher Neal of the Ottawa Citizen wrote that the categorization of AI182 "as a uniquely Canadian tragedy" is "[t]he real contribution" of the book.

The short story "The Management of Grief," within the collection The Middleman, is based on The Sorrow and the Terror.

== Reception ==
Some book reviews said that the book had, as dubbed by the Associated Press, a "compassionate" look at the parents of the children who were passengers, and those reviews were positive. Glavin wrote that the book is "a detailed, well-crafted and dramatic account". Susan Semenak of The Montreal Gazette wrote that the book "is strongest when it helps us see through the eyes" of family members of the deceased.

Frank Jones and other authors criticized the book's statements regarding Sikh responsibility for the attacks. Norman Sigurdson of the Winnipeg Free Press wrote that the book had a "moving memorial to the innocent dead" but that the point of view that is "disturbingly patronizing" towards Sikhs who do not assimilate and the idea that the blame goes entirely on unassimilated Sikhs is an "altogether unforgivable" "continual fostering of the prejudices which led to the tragedy". Zuhair Kasheri of The Globe and Mail said that the authors were "doing what they accuse the Sikhs of doing — exacting revenge." Semenak said that the book held the whole of Canada's Sikh population responsible for the attack and stating that all of them were "abusive, marginal lumberjacks and truckers" while it depicted Hindus as ""model" citizens, professionals, bureaucrats and entrepreneurs"; Semenak further argued that "the book rapidly loses its remaining credibility when authors take on Canadian multiculturalism policies". Glavin said "A Toronto newspaper known for its rather audacious versions of events surrounding the Air-India bombing has already slagged the book in a review of its own".

The authors had plans to do a book tour in western Canada. Penguin Books canceled the tour and said that there had been concerns for the safety of the authors.
