= Miss New India =

2011 novel by Bharati Mukherjee

- Author: Bharati Mukherjee
- Language: English
- Publisher: Houghton Mifflin Harcourt
- Publication date: 2011
- Publication place: United States

Miss New India is Bharati Mukherjee's eighth novel. It was published in 2011 by Houghton Mifflin Harcourt. Miss New India is "the third part of a trilogy that began with Desirable Daughters (2002) and The Tree Bride (2004)."

== Plot ==
Anjali Bose, a young woman, escapes to Bangalore from her stifled existence in the backward and provincial state of Bihar in India. In Bangalore she experiences the newly exploding wealth and growth of the city. She obtains employment in a call center and finds herself surrounded by entrepreneurs and fortunes. Along the way, she overcomes hardships and obstacles to ultimately reinvent herself. The title and the story are a metaphor for the new India that is prosperously emerging on the world stage. The title and story also allude to the old India and the new.

== Synopsis ==
The novel follows Anjali (Angie) Bose, a young, ambitious woman from the small village of Gauripur, Bihar, India. She feels trapped in Gauripur and desperately wishes to escape the traditional life her father wants her to live. Anjali's father takes his traditional duty to arrange a marriage for Anjali very seriously, sifting through dozens of candidates, all of whom are rejected by Anjali. He sees that a successful arranged marriage can help salvage his reputation after the disaster that was Sonali's marriage.

Peter Champion, Anjali's English teacher, recognizes her intelligence and restlessness in Gauripur and strongly encourages Anjali to move to Bangalore, even calling it the "new India". He offers to help set Anjali up in Gauripur, but Anjali initially turns Peter down as she does not yet see herself ready to move to Bangalore. Circumstance soon forces Anajli to reconsider; she goes out with a young man that her father plans to have her marry. While alone with the boy, she is brutally raped. Scared to speak out against the young man, she chooses to run away to avoid marrying.

She goes to Peter Champion to accept his earlier offer to set her up in Bangalore. Peter gives her a contact for housing, a contact for a career, and a significant sum of money, fifty thousand rupees, more than Anjali had ever seen, let alone handled. To avoid her father, who works at the railway station, Anjali makes the long journey on a bus.

Once she arrives in Bangalore, Anjali meets a man she calls Mr. GG, who drives her to Peter's contact. She arrives at the Bagehot House, an Anglo-Indian mansion from a long bygone era of India. The owner, Minne Bagehot, agrees to rent Anjali a room while also vaguely explaining the rules of the house. She meets the house's residents: Hussiena, Sunita, Tookie, and Asoke. After a period of acclimatization to the city, she attends the Contemporary Communication Institute (CCI) to learn and adopt English, preparing her to become a call center representative. However, at the conclusion of the two-week program that she enrolls in, Peter's contacts, Usha Desai and Parvati Banerji, suggest to Anjali to find a different career.

Anjali returns to the Bagehot house to find that riots have erupted outside the mansion. While looters ransack the home, Anjali finds Minne dead in the bathroom. She shouts to the police for help, but when they arrive, they arrest Anjali. At the police station, Anjali is interrogated about her relation to a terrorist plot. Anjali finds out that her identity had been stolen by Hussiena. After being booked, Mr. GG comes to arrange Anjali's release. No longer having a place to live, she is taken in by Parvati Banerji.

After the events that led to her arrest, Anjali is left devastated, losing her confidence and her character. With the help of Mr. GG and Rabi Chatterjee, she began to find herself again. Anjali is again tested when a break-in occurs at Parvati's home by Tookie and some of her friends. Anjali risks herself to defend Parvati's home and property, finally asserting her own strength and independence.

The story closes with Anjali taking an offer from Mr. GG to become a debt-collection agent. In the epilogue, Anjali returns to Gauripur, now a city that has been renewed. She returns as a person of status, visiting Peter Champion home to discuss her story with some students.

== Major Characters ==
=== Characters from Gauripur ===
- Anjali (Angie) Bose - Anjali is the protagonist in this novel. She is ambitious, talented, and rebellious. She seeks a greater life than a traditional arranged marriage. She moves to Bangalore in search of opportunity. Through the novel she has an "alter-ego" she calls "Angie" which slowly evolves with her experiences through the novel.
- Peter Champion - Peter Champion is an American scholar who moved to live in India. He is Anjali's English teacher and acts as her main mentor through the early parts of the novel. He pushes Anjali to move to Bangalore and even goes so far as to pay for her travels. In the early stages of the book he has a relationship with a transgender man named Ali.
- Sonali Bose - Sonali is Anjali's older sister. Her character represents one of the greatest influences on Anjali. The life that Sonali lives after her arranged marriage drives Anjali to seek another life because it is so messy.
- Pratfulla Bose - Pratfulla is Anjali's father. He is a railway clerk at Gauripur's rail station. He deeply believes in Indian tradition and seeks to use Anjali's marriage as a way to regain respect for the Bose family name after the disaster of Sonali's marriage.
- Rabi Chatterjee - Rabi is a young photographer and an acquaintance of Peter Champion. He comes from an esteemed Indian family. He is another character with a major influence on Anjali's transition to the modern India.

=== Characters from Bangalore ===
- Girish Gujral (Mr. GG) - Mr. GG is a journalist who Anjali meets early into her adventure in Bangalore.
- Mrs. Bagehot (Minnie) - Mrs. Bagehot is the landlady of the Bagehot House, a colonial era mansion. She is an old acquaintance of Peter Champion and she provides Anjali with a space to live in. She is nostalgic of the old Raj era of India, with the mansion littered with relic from that era.
- Asoke - Asoke is the servant and caretaker of the Bagehot House. He is a quiet but loyal figure to Mrs. Bagehot.
- Tookie - Tookie is one of the residents of the Bagehot House and works in a call-center processing insurance claims.
- Husseina - Husseina is another resident of the Bagehot House. She is educated in an American school in Dubai and speaks flawless English. She too works in a call-center.
- Sunita - Sunita is the final Bagehot resident. She works for a home security company, making emergency calls.
- Usha Desai - Ms. Desai is also a co-founder of CCI. She is another old acquaintance of Peter Champion and she agrees to give Anjali an opportunity for a career as a call-center agent.
- Parvati Banerji - Mrs. Banerji is a co-founder of CCI. Becomes a great supporter of Anjali, giving her a place to live after the Bagehot House is looted.

== Reception ==
Bharati Mukherjee's novel was received with generally positive reviews from literary critics. Reviewers praised the representation of India's youth rebelling against tradition. The novel was also praised for its representation of gender, autonomy, and a transforming India. However, some critics found the novel "unfulfilling" as Anjali never fully takes "charge of her destiny". Additionally, some critics expressed frustration at the incompletion of several plot lines and inconsistent themes. Overall, the novel is praised as a good fast-paced story that is a good read for people interested in modern Indian fiction.
