= Barrington, Nova Scotia (community) =

Barrington
- Community
- Location of Barrington, Nova Scotia
- Coordinates: 43.562778°N 65.561667°W
- Country: Canada
- Province: Nova Scotia
- County: Shelburne
- Municipal district: Barrington

Population (2006)
  - Total: 3,856
  - Change (2001-06): ▼3.2%
- Time zone: UTC-4 (AST)
  - Summer (DST): UTC-3 (ADT)
- Postal code(s): B0W 1E0
- Area code: 902
- Access Routes Hwy 103: Trunk 3 Route 309

Barrington is an unincorporated Canadian rural community of about 4,000 people on the northeast corner of Barrington Bay in Shelburne County, Nova Scotia.

Barrington is part of the much larger Municipality of the District of Barrington, also wholly within Shelburne County.

== History ==
Barrington's inhabitants are mostly descendants of the first settlers from Chatham and Harwich on Cape Cod, Massachusetts who emigrated to the area during the 1760s. One such settler was Solomon Kendrick, father of John Kendrick, explorer and maritime fur trader. Solomon moved from Harwich, Cape Cod, to Barrington in the 1760s.

== In popular culture ==
Disguised as "Barringford," Barrington is the main setting of Canadian novelist Hugh Hood's debut 1964 novel, White Figure, White Ground.

== See also ==
- List of communities in Nova Scotia
