= Jewish Review =

Jewish newspaper published in Portland, Oregon

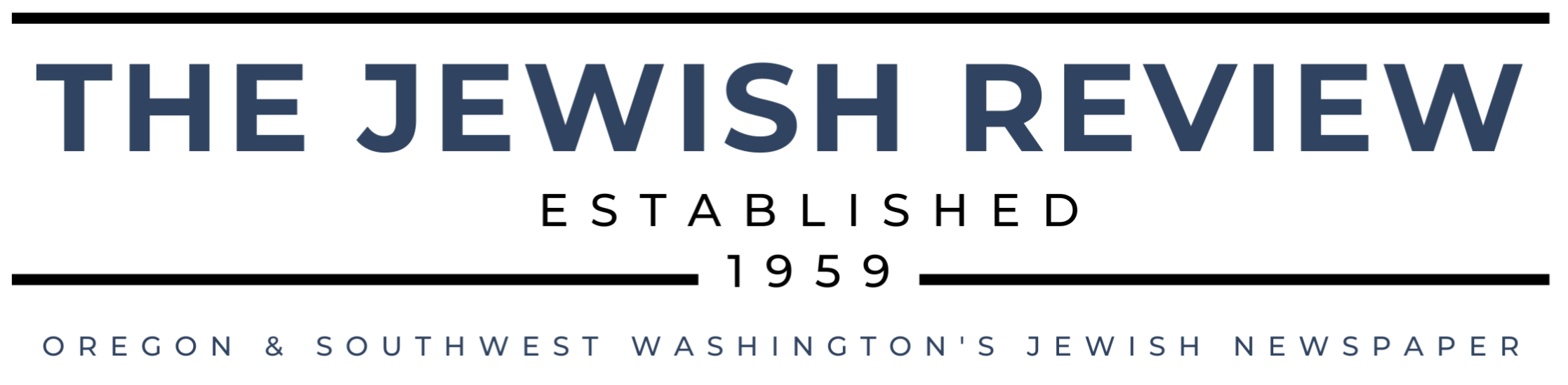
- Type: Bi-weekly
- Format: Digital-only
- Publisher: Jewish Federation of Greater Portland
- Editor: Jewish Federation of Greater Portland
- Founded: 1959
- Ceased publication: 2012
- Relaunched: March 4, 2020
- Headquarters: Portland, Oregon, U.S.
- Circulation: 1296 copies (24 times a year for 54 years)
- Website: jewishportland.org/jewishreview
- Free online archives: jewishreview.co.il

The Jewish Review was a twice-monthly, non-profit newspaper published in Portland, Oregon, United States. The paper had been published from 1959 to 2012 by the Jewish Federation of Greater Portland. It relaunched on March 4, 2020 as an online only bi-weekly publication.
