= Days and Nights in Calcutta =

Book by Clark Blaise

- Author: Clark Blaise, Bharati Mukherjee
- Publisher: Doubleday
- Publication date: 1977

Days and Nights in Calcutta is a work of memoir by husband-and-wife authors Clark Blaise and Bharati Mukherjee first published by Doubleday in 1977. Blaise, a Canadian author, and Mukherjee, originally from the Indian state of West Bengal, had been married for a decade when they decided in 1973 to travel with their two children to India and spend a year in Calcutta (now Kolkata) with Mukherjee's family. The first half of the book is told from Blaise's point of view as a Westerner adjusting to life with a large upper-class Indian family and the unfamiliar traditions and patterns of life he found in India. The second half is told from Mukherjee's perspective after fourteen years' absence from the land of her birth, testing her childhood memories against the realities of 1973 India and examining the differences between the path her life had followed and the life she might have lived had she remained in India.

The first American paperback edition, published in 1995 by Hungry Mind Press included a new prologue by Blaise and new epilogue by Mukherjee, providing additional perspective on the visit to India the pair had made more than two decades before.
