= David Helwig =

Canadian editor and writer (1938–2018)

David Helwig CM
- Born: April 5, 1938; Toronto, Ontario, Canada
- Died: October 16, 2018 (aged 80); Montague, Prince Edward Island, Canada
- Education: University of Toronto; University of Liverpool
- Occupation: Writer
- Children: Maggie Helwig, Kate Helwig
- Writing career
- Language: English
- Genres: Fiction, Poetry, Nonfiction
- Notable awards: Order of Canada; J. M. Abraham Poetry Award (formerly Atlantic Poetry Award); Matt Cohen Award
- Website: www.davidhelwig.com

David Helwig CM (April 5, 1938 – October 16, 2018) was a Canadian editor, essayist, memoirist, novelist, poet, short story writer and translator.

== Life and career ==
Helwig was born in Toronto, Ontario, where he spent his early childhood years. When he was ten years old, his family moved to Niagara-on-the-Lake, Ontario, where his father ran a small business repairing and refinishing furniture and buying and selling antiques. He earned a B.A. from the University of Toronto in 1960, and an M.A. from the University of Liverpool in 1962. He subsequently taught at Queen's University from 1962 to 1974. While he was at Queen's University, he also taught writing classes in Collins Bay Penitentiary. In 1972, he co-wrote A Book about Billie with an inmate of the prison.

In 1971, he founded and was long-time editor of the Best Canadian Stories anthology series for Oberon Press. From 1974 to 1976, he was the literary manager for CBC Television's drama department. In 1980, he retired from teaching and became a full-time writer.

His work includes a series of novels set in Kingston, Ontario, known as "The Kingston Novels": The Glass Knight, Jennifer, A Sound Like Laughter, and It is Always Summer. His best known poem, "Considerations", was published in Maclean's in 1970. His poetry collections have received numerous awards, including the CBC poetry award for Catchpenny Poems (1983) and the Atlantic Poetry Award for The Year One (2004). As an adult, Helwig learned Russian and published two books of translations of short stories by Anton Chekhov which included About Love (short story).

From 1959 to 1991, he was married to actor/director/theatre manager Nancy Helwig, the mother of his two children, Maggie Helwig and Kate Helwig. He lived his later years in Belfast, Prince Edward Island with his second wife, Judy Gaudet. His daughter, Maggie Helwig, is a noted writer and social justice activist in Toronto.

In 2007, he received the Matt Cohen Award from the Writers' Trust of Canada in honor of his lifetime contribution to Canadian literature. On January 23, 2008, he was appointed Prince Edward Island's third Poet Laureate and on July 1, 2009 he was named a Member of the Order of Canada.

Helwig died on October 16, 2018, at the age of 80 at a hospital in Montague, Prince Edward Island.

== Works by David Helwig ==
=== Poetry ===
- Figures in a Landscape, 1968
- The Sign of the Gunman, 1969
- The Best Name of Silence, 1972
- Atlantic Crossings, 1974
- Book of the Hours, 1979
- The Rain Falls Like Rain, 1982
- Catchpenny Poems, 1983
- The Hundred Old Names, 1989
- The Beloved, 1992
- A Random Gospel, 1996
- This Human Day, 2000
- Telling Stories, 2000
- The Year One, 2004
- The Sway of Otherwise, 2008
- Seawrack, 2013
- Keeping Late Hours, 2015
- Sudden and Absolute Stranger, 2017
- A House in Memory: Last Poems, 2020

=== Fiction ===
- The Streets of Summer, 1969 (short stories)
- The Day Before Tomorrow, 1971 (titled Message from a Spy in 1975 printing)
- The Glass Knight, 1976
- Jennifer, 1979
- The King's Evil, 1981
- It Is Always Summer, 1982
- A Sound Like Laughter, 1983
- The Only Son, 1984
- The Bishop, 1986
- A Postcard from Rome, 1988
- Old Wars, 1989
- Of Desire, 1990
- Blueberry Cliffs, 1993 (novella)
- Just Say the Words, 1994
- Close to the Fire, 1999 (novella)
- The Time of Her Life, 2000
- The Stand-In, 2002 (novella)
- Duet, 2004 (novella)
- Saltsea, 2006
- Smuggling Donkeys, 2007 (novella)
- Coming Through, 2007 (three novellas)
- Mystery Stories, 2010 (short stories)
- Killing McGee, 2011 (novella)
- Simon Says, 2012
- Clyde, 2014

=== Other ===
- A Book About Billie, 1972 (documentary) (as Inside and Out, 1975)
- Last Stories of Anton Chekhov, 1991 (as translator)
- The Child of Someone, 1997 (essays)
- Living Here, 2001 (essays)
- The Names of Things, 2006 (memoir)
- About Love, 2012 (as translator)
- The Essential Tom Marshall, 2012 (co-edited with Michael Ondaatje)

== See also ==
- Canadian literature
- Canadian poetry
- List of Canadian poets
