= The Tiger's Daughter =

1971 novel by Bharati Mukherjee

- First edition (US)
- Author: Bharati Mukherjee
- Cover artist: Frank Bozzo
- Language: English
- Publisher: Houghton Mifflin (US); Chatto & Windus (UK)
- Publication date: 1971
- Publication place: United States
- Media type: Print (hardback & paperback)
- Pages: 210 pp
- ISBN: 0-395-12715-7
- OCLC: 217219
- Dewey Decimal: 813/.5/4
- LC Class: PZ4.M9555 Ti3 PR9499.3.M77
- Followed by: Wife (1975)

The Tiger's Daughter is the first novel by Indian American author Bharati Mukherjee, published in 1971 by Houghton Mifflin.

== Plot summary ==
The story revolves around Tara who was raised in Calcutta, educated at Vassar College in New York and is married to an American man. The novel explores her sense of culture shock when she travels back to India intertwined with the political situation in Calcutta and West Bengal.

== Publication history ==
- Hardcover – ISBN 0-395-12715-7, published in 1971 by Houghton Mifflin
- Paperback – ISBN 0-449-22100-8, published in 1992 by Fawcett Crest
