= Jasmine (novel) =

1989 novel by Bharati Mukherjee

- First edition
- Author: Bharati Mukherjee
- Language: English
- Genre: Novel
- Publisher: Grove Press
- Publication date: 1989
- Publication place: United States
- Media type: Print (Hardcover, Paperback)
- Pages: 241
- ISBN: 0-8021-1032-0
- OCLC: 19625274
- Preceded by: The Middleman and Other Stories
- Followed by: The Holder of the World

Jasmine is a novel by Bharati Mukherjee set in the 1980s about a young Indian woman in the United States who, trying to adapt to the American way of life in order to be able to survive, changes identities several times. Mukherjee's own experiences of dislocation and displacement in her life helps her in recording the immigrant experience of the protagonist in this novel.

== Plot summary ==
Jasmine, which was based on an earlier short story in The Middleman and Other Stories, tells the story of a seventeen-year-old girl widowed after her husband's murder in a bomb attack. She and her husband originally planned to move to Florida, but as a result of his death Jasmine continues with the trip on her own. In her path she faces many obstacles as she travels from Florida to New York City to Iowa.

The novel opens with Jasmine recounting a childhood tale about an astrologer who foretells her future as a widow living in exile. The narrative then shifts to her life in Baden, Iowa, where Jasmine, known as Jane, is 24 years old, pregnant, and cohabiting with 53-year-old banker Bud Ripplemayer and his adopted son, Du. Bud is determined to marry Jane, despite her unexplained refusal. Bud uses a wheelchair after being shot in the back two years prior. Jane and Bud's neighbor is Darrel Lutz, a recent college graduate who has inherited his family's farm and is debating whether to sell it. Bud is reluctant to lend Darrel money to expand his herd and crops, distrusting his ability as both a farmer and a manager. Additionally, Darrel expresses romantic interest in Jane.

Jane walks us through her life with Du and Bud before flashing back to her life in Hasnapur, Jullundhar district, Punjab, India (page 39). Here in India, she is known as Jyoti. She has a teacher named Masterji, who teaches her English. Masterji urges Jyoti to continue with her education instead of getting married. Soon after Jyoti's father passes away, she meets Prakash. They marry and move in together. He begins to call her Jasmine. Prakash works two jobs and studies for his diploma exams while Jasmine runs a Ladies' Group raffle and sells detergent to make money. Prakash receives a letter from Professor Vadhera who encourages Prakash to study in America. He makes plans to move the two of them to Florida, when while out shopping for saris, Prakash is killed by a bomb, set off by a man named Sukhwinder. He yells "Prostitutes! Whores!" at Jasmine before the bomb goes off.

As "a matter of duty and honor," Jasmine continues with Prakash's plans to move to Florida, travelling by plane, train, and ship. Half-Face, the captain of the ship drives Jasmine to a motel when they arrive to land. He then sexually assaults her. Jasmine contemplates killing herself but instead kills Half-Face. She burns Prakash's suit that she carried with her and leaves the motel.

Jasmine meets Lillian Gordon, who takes her in. Mrs. Gordon is also housing three Kanjobal women. She calls Jasmine "Jazzy," and helps Jazzy get to New York to meet with Professor Vadhera. Lillian also has a daughter named Kate Gordon-Feldstein who works as a photographer in the city. Lillian is later sent to jail for "exploiting" undocumenteds for free cooking, cleaning and yard work. For five months, Jasmine lives with Professor Vadhera, whom she calls Professorji. She becomes depressed because she fears to leave the house without a green card. Professorji agrees to get her a green card, for fifty thousand rupees, or three thousand dollars.

Jasmine begins working for Wylie and Taylor Hayes, friends of Kate Gordon-Feldstein. She moves in with them in Manhattan to take care of their adopted daughter, Duff. Taylor calls her "Jase." Wylie falls out of love with Taylor and falls for Stuart. Wylie leaves Taylor, but Jase continues to take care of Duff. She falls in love with Taylor, but one day while the three of them are at the park, Jase spots Sukhwinder, the man that killed Prakash. She flees New York for Iowa. She chooses Iowa because Duff's birth mother lives in Iowa.

Back in present-day Iowa, Jane recalls the night two years ago when Harlan Kroener shot Bud. They were walking to Harlan's car when he shot Bud. He then proceeded to kill himself. Harlan was angry at Bud because of money issues with the bank. Before Bud met Jane, he was married to Karin. Karin initially hates Jane for taking her husband from her, but they maintain a platonic relationship.

Jane receives a letter from Taylor, letting her know he and Duff are on their way to find Jane. Du figures out Jane is in love with another man besides Bud. Jane goes to visit Darrel because he says he feels crazy, but she leaves soon when he starts insulting her and Bud's relationship. She suspects he might shoot himself that night. When she returns home, Du announces that he is going to Los Angeles to live with his sister and he leaves with his friend John. Karin visits, and the two of them drive to see how Darrel is faring. He is fixing up his hog house.

Back at the house, Jane tells Bud that Du went to visit his sister but he will be back before school starts. Bud later approves of Darrel's loan application, and the two of them drive over to let him know the news. But when they arrive, they discover him hanging from a rafter.

Bud begs for Jane to tell him she loves him, but she doesn't respond. Du has decided to stay in California. While Jane is working in the kitchen, she sees a car pull up the driveway and Taylor and Duff get out of the car. Taylor tries to convince Jase to come with him to California. She is conflicted, thinking of Bud who will lose everything if she leaves. She calls Karin and tells her she's "going somewhere," to see Du. Jasmine stops thinking of herself as Jane and follows Taylor and Duff to the car, whispering "Watch me re-position the stars," to the astrologer who foretold her widowhood and exile.

== Main characters ==
- Jyoti/Jasmine/Jane/Jase - The protagonist of the novel. She is called different names throughout her journey from India to Iowa, each name signifying pivotal moments in her life.
- Prakash Vijh - Jasmine's first husband whom she marries while in Hasnapur, India. He is a "modern man, a city man" who works two jobs as a repairman and a bookkeeper while studying for his diploma exams.
- Taylor - Jasmine's employer and love interest. He is the father of Duff, the young girl for whom Jasmine serves as a nanny when living in New York.
- Bud Ripplemeyer - Jasmine's husband whom she meets through his mother in Iowa. He works for a bank and is paralyzed when he is shot.
- Du Thien- Jasmine and Bud's adopted Vietnamese son. He is fourteen when they adopt him but age seventeen during the novel.
- Darrell Lutz - Jasmine's neighbor while in Iowa. He seems to be infatuated by Jasmine. He is a farmer and struggles to get a loan from Bud's bank in the novel.
- Karin - Bud's ex-wife whom he leaves for Jasmine.

== Minor characters ==
- Masterji - Jyoti's teacher, who encourages her to learn English.
- Professor Vadhera - Prakash's professor who lives in New York City. He encourages Prakash to apply to Florida International Institute of Technology. He takes Jasmine in when she arrives in New York.
- Mataji - Jyoti's mother, who pushes Jyoti to stay in school three years longer than her sisters.
- Pitaji - Jyoti's father.
- Dida - Pitaji's mother, who doesn't want Jyoti to remain in school. She finds a groom for Jyoti but Masterji convinces the family to let her continue with her studies.

== Reception ==
- Selected as a New York Times Book Review notable book of the year.

== See also ==
- Julia Álvarez's novel How the García Girls Lost Their Accents (1992) tells the story of a wealthy Dominican family fleeing their troubled country and starting a new life in New York City.

== Scholarly reviews ==
- Reddy, Vanita (2013). "Beauty and the Limits of National Belonging in Bharati Mukherjee's "Jasmine"". Contemporary Literature. 54 (2): 337–368. doi:10.1353/cli.2013.0018. JSTOR 43297880. S2CID 162303036.
- Kain, Geoffrey (1993). ""Suspended Between Two Worlds": Bharati Mukherjee's "Jasmine" and the Fusion of Hindu and American Myth". Journal of South Asian Literature. 28 (1/2): 151–158. JSTOR 40873337.
- Ninh, Erin Khuê (2013). "Gold-Digger: Reading the Marital and National Romance in Bharati Mukherjee's "Jasmine"". MELUS. 38 (3): 146–159. doi:10.1093/MELUS/mlt030. JSTOR 42001243.
