= Wife (novel) =

1975 novel by Bharati Mukherjee

- First edition
- Author: Bharati Mukherjee
- Language: English
- Published: 1975 Houghton Mifflin
- Publication place: United States
- Media type: Print (paperback)
- Pages: 213 pg
- ISBN: 0-395-20439-9
- OCLC: 1176882
- Dewey Decimal: 813/.5/4
- LC Class: PZ4.M9555 Wi3 PR9499.3.M77
- Preceded by: The Tiger's Daughter (1971)
- Followed by: Darkness (1985)

Wife (1975) is a novel by Bharati Mukherjee.The book was originally published by Houghton Mifflin.

== Plot summary ==
This is the story of Dimple Dasgupta who has an arranged marriage to Amit Basu, an engineer, instead of marrying a neurosurgeon as she had dreamed about. They move to the United States and experience culture shock and loneliness. At one point, she jumps rope to escape her pregnancy. As frustration becomes expressed as abuse, the tale turns to tragedy with the murder of her husband, Amit at the end.

== Publication history ==
- Hardcover – ISBN 0-395-20439-9, published in 1975 by Houghton Mifflin
- Paperback – ISBN 0-449-22098-2, published by Fawcett Crest
