= Leave It to Me (novel) =

1997 novel by Bharati Mukherjee

- Author: Bharati Mukherjee
- Language: English
- Genre: Novel
- Publisher: Alfred A. Knopf
- Publication date: 1997
- Publication place: United States
- Media type: Print (hardback & paperback)
- Pages: 239 pp (first edition, hardback)
- ISBN: 0-679-43427-5 (first edition, hardback)
- OCLC: 36446807
- Dewey Decimal: 813/.54 21
- LC Class: PR9499.3.M77 L43 1997
- Preceded by: The Holder of the World
- Followed by: Desirable Daughters

Leave It to Me is a 1997 novel by Bharati Mukherjee. The story utilizes the myth of the Hindu Goddess, Durga, who is associated with protection, strength, motherhood, destruction, creation, and wars.

== Publication history ==
- Hardcover — ISBN 0-679-43427-5 (ISBN 978-0-67943-427-6), published in June 1997 by Alfred A. Knopf.
- Paperback — ISBN 0-449-00396-5 (ISBN 978-0-44900-396-1), published in November 1998 by Random House.
