= The Middleman and Other Stories =

1988 short story collection by Bharati Mukherjee

- Front cover image
- Author: Bharati Mukherjee
- Subject: Fiction, Immigrant experiences, Diasporas, Manners and customs
- Genre: Indo-Anglian fiction (short stories)
- Set in: Various locales
- Published: 1988
- Publisher: Grove Press
- Publication place: United States, United Kingdom
- Media type: Print, Audio, E-book
- Pages: 190+
- ISBN: 9780802110312 , 9780802136503, 9780449217184
- OCLC: 17412386
- Website: Official website

The Middleman and Other Stories is a collection of short stories written by Bharati Mukherjee, published in 1988 though Grove Press. The collection won the 1988 National Book Critics Circle Award.

Stories from this volume are frequently anthologized, particularly Orbiting, A Wife's Story, and The Middleman. The short story Jasmine would later be developed into the 1989 novel Jasmine.

== Synopsis ==
According to Michiko Kakutani, of The New York Times, the characters populating these stories are "all exiles, expatriates, wanderers, people on the move, shucking off old lives as easily as a snake sheds its skin. They are third-world refugees, fleeing poverty and oppression; but they are also Americans moving from coast to coast, small towns to cities, exchanging one partner for another in search of a dream that always seems to elude them. Although they possess a seemingly infinite freedom - the possibility of becoming whatever they want to become — the price of that freedom is rootlessness and dislocation, a feeling of perpetual displacement."

== Contents ==
Story	Originally published in
"The Middleman"	
"A Wife's Story"	
"Loose Ends"	
"Orbiting"	
"Fighting for the Rebound"	
"The Tenant"	
"Fathering"	
"Jasmine"	
"Danny's Girls"	
"Buried Lives"	
"The Management of Grief"	

== Reception ==
- Selected as a New York Times Book Review notable book of the year.
- National Book Critics Circle Award.
- The story The Tenant appeared in The Best American Short Stories 1987.

== See also ==
- Miss New India Bharati Mukherjee's eighth novel
