= The Tree Bride =

2004 novel by Bharati Mukherjee

- First edition cover
- Author: Bharati Mukherjee
- Language: English
- Genre: Historical
- Published: August 2004 Theia
- Publication place: United States
- Media type: Print (Hardback & Paperback)
- Pages: 293 pp (hardback edition) & 304 pp (paperback edition)
- ISBN: 1-4013-0058-8 (hardback edition); 0-7868-8866-0 (paperback edition)
- OCLC: 54529482
- Dewey Decimal: 813/.54 22
- LC Class: PR9499.3.M77 T74 2004
- Preceded by: Desirable Daughters

The Tree Bride, (2004) is a historical novel by Bharati Mukherjee. It is the sequel to Desirable Daughters.

== Plot introduction ==
The quiet brahmin girl from Bengal becomes a passionate resister of foreign rule, against the British Raj. The narrator discovers her ancestor's struggle for her land, whilst seeking to establish herself as an American citizen.

== Publication history ==
- Hardcover — ISBN 1-4013-0058-8 (ISBN 978-1-4013-0058-6), published in August 2004 by Theia.
- Paperback — ISBN 0-7868-8866-0 (ISBN 978-0-7868-8866-5), published in August 2005 by Hyperion
