= Little India (magazine) =

US magazine

- Editor: Achal Mehra
- Categories: Cultural magazine
- Frequency: Monthly
- Circulation: 142,000
- Publisher: Achal Mehra
- Founded: 1991
- Country: United States
- Language: English
- Website: www.littleindia.com
- ISSN: 1522-449X

Little India is the largest circulated Indian American publication in the United States. The magazine was established in 1991 by its founding editor and publisher, Achal Mehra, a professor at Albright College in Reading, Pennsylvania. It focuses on the non-resident Indians (NRIs) in the United States and features editorials and articles on living in the United States while being of Indian heritage and happenings and people from India. Usually there are several NRIs that are highlighted in each issue as well as articles on politics, problems of acculturation and cultural retention that most ABCDs face, news from India, popular culture, students, Bollywood, Indian cuisine and the generation gap.

The magazine is published monthly and has a BPA audited circulation of over 142,000, penetrating almost one in five Indian households in the United States. The magazine is published in nine editions from coast to coast—New York, New Jersey, Massachusetts, Washington, D.C., Georgia, Florida, Illinois, Texas and California. Little India has won 21 Ippie Awards from the Independent Press Association of New York and seven New American Media awards as well as Magazine of the Year 2006 from the South Asian Students Alliance. Little India is believed to be the largest overseas Indian publication in the world.

== See also ==
- Indians in the New York City metropolitan region
