= Valley India Times =

Monthly. newspaper in Maricopa County, Arizona

- Type: Monthly newspaper
- Founded: 2000
- Ceased publication: 2016
- Headquarters: Chandler, Arizona
- City: Chandler
- Country: United States
- OCLC number: 50392295
- Website: azindiatimes.com

Valley India Times was an Indian American newspaper based in Chandler, Maricopa County, Arizona. It was mailed out to readers on a monthly basis. The newspaper delivers to all major counties within the state, as well as to out of state subscribers. It was created in 2000; the original name for the Indian newspaper, which was used during the first year of publishing, was AZ India. Due to the purchasing agreement when business ownership changed in 2000, the name was changed. Valley India Times is the only Indian American newspaper in Arizona. The paper, a complimentary mailing, has a website and social media networks. Local businesses, holy establishments, and restaurants receive copies of the newspaper.

This newspaper was sold in the summer of 2016 and the last issue published as Valley India Times was the June 2016 issue. It is now published as the AZ India Times.

The owners tout the newspaper as "an artifact of the Indo-American society's presence within Arizona". It also links religious establishments with worshipers and those interested in cultural activities hosted at temples and community centers.
