= Oberon Press =

Canadian book publisher

- Founded: 1966; 59 years ago
- Founder: Michael Macklem
- Country of origin: Canada
- Headquarters location: Ottawa
- Publication types: Books
- Official website: www.oberonpress.ca

Oberon Press is an independent Canadian literary publisher founded in 1966. It focuses mainly on Canadian fiction—particularly short stories—and poetry, but also publishes criticism, history, biography and autobiography.

Oberon has published early work by Canadian writers such as David Adams Richards, Wayne Johnston, Peter Behrens, Hugh Hood, David Helwig, bpNichol, George Bowering and W.P. Kinsella. Two short-story anthologies, Best Canadian Stories and Coming Attractions, feature the work of established and new Canadian writers. Oberon’s national restaurant guide, Where to Eat in Canada, published annually since 1971, has sold more than 150,000 copies.

The Best Canadian Stories anthology, now in its fortieth edition, has been edited by David Helwig, John Metcalf, Clark Blaise, Leon Rooke and Douglas Glover, and features the best stories of the preceding year. Coming Attractions, which introduces previously unpublished writers, has appeared annually since 1980. Writers published in Coming Attractions include Rohinton Mistry, Frances Itani, Lisa Moore, Dennis Bock, Neil Smith, Timothy Taylor, Bonnie Burnard, Sharon Butala, Steven Heighton, Caroline Adderson and Rebecca Rosenblum.

Oberon published eight new titles in 2010, and now has 664 titles in print in 1216 editions. Many of Oberon’s books are typeset in the company’s own printshop, using traditional hot-metal techniques. The books are printed on acid-free paper on a sheet-fed offset printing press.

Michael Macklem, the founder and president of Oberon, was awarded the Order of Canada in 2006 in recognition of his work with the press.
