= Lorraine York =

Canadian literary historian

Lorraine York is a Canadian literary historian in English and Cultural Studies, currently the Senator William McMaster Chair in Canadian Literature and Culture at McMaster University.

York is named Fellow of the Royal Society of Canada 2017, together with Margery Fee and Lucie Hotte.
