= Bharati Mukherjee =

Indian-American writer

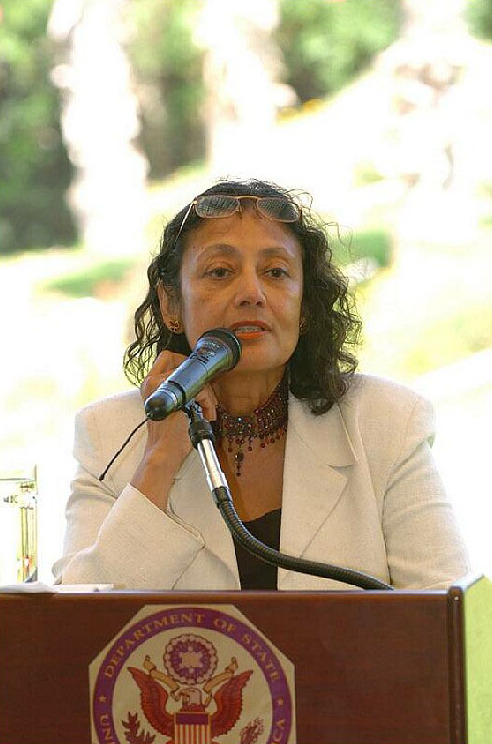
- Speaking at the US Ambassador's residence in Israel, June 11, 2004
- Born: Bharati Mukherjee; July 27, 1940; Calcutta, Bengal Province, British India (present-day Kolkata, West Bengal, India)
- Died: January 28, 2017 (aged 76); New York City, U.S.
- Occupations: Professor; novelist; essayist; short story writer; author; fiction writer; non-fiction writer
- Spouse: Clark Blaise
- Writing career
- Genres: Novels, short stories, essays, travel literature, journalism.
- Subjects: Post-colonial Anglophone fiction, Asian American fiction, autobiographical narratives, memoirs, American culture, immigration history, reformation and nationhood in the '90s, multiculturalism vs. mongrelization, fiction writing, autobiography writing, and the form and theory of fiction.
- Notable work: Jasmine

Bharati Mukherjee (July 27, 1940 – January 28, 2017) was an American and Canadian writer and professor emerita in the department of English at the University of California, Berkeley. Born in India, she was the author of a number of novels and short story collections, as well as works of nonfiction that often focused on the experience of Indian immigrants to America.

== Early life and education ==
Of Indian Hindu Bengali Brahmin origin, Mukherjee was born in present-day Kolkata, West Bengal, India during British rule. She later travelled with her parents to Europe after Independence, only returning to Calcutta in the early 1950s. There she attended the Loreto School. She received her B.A. from the University of Calcutta in 1959 as a student of Loreto College, and subsequently earned her M.A. from Maharaja Sayajirao University of Baroda in 1961. She next travelled to the United States to study at the University of Iowa. She received her M.F.A. from the Iowa Writers' Workshop in 1963 and her PhD in 1969 from the department of Comparative Literature.

== Career ==
In 1966, Mukherjee and her family moved to Canada, where she became a naturalized citizen and worked at McGill University. After more than a decade living in Montreal and Toronto in Canada, Mukherjee and her husband, Clark Blaise, returned to the United States. She wrote of the decision in "An Invisible Woman," published in a 1981 issue of Saturday Night. Mukherjee and Blaise co-authored Days and Nights in Calcutta (1977). They also wrote the 1987 book, The Sorrow and the Terror regarding the Air India Flight 182 tragedy.

In addition to writing many works of fiction and non-fiction, Mukherjee taught at Skidmore College, Queens College, and City University of New York before joining the faculty at UC Berkeley.

In 1988 Mukherjee won the National Book Critics Circle Award for her collection The Middleman and Other Stories. That year, she also became a naturalized American citizen. In a 1989 interview with Ameena Meer, Mukherjee stated that she considered herself an American writer, and not an Indian expatriate writer.

== Death ==
Mukherjee died due to complications of rheumatoid arthritis and takotsubo cardiomyopathy on January 28, 2017, in Manhattan at the age of 76. She was survived by her husband and son. Her other son, Bart, predeceased her in 2015.

== Works ==
=== Novels ===
- The Tiger's Daughter (1971)
- Wife (1975)
- Jasmine (1989)
- The Holder of the World (1993)
- Leave It to Me (1997)
- Desirable Daughters (2002)
- The Tree Bride (2004)
- Miss New India (2011)

=== Short story collections ===
- Darkness (1985)
- The Middleman and Other Stories (1988)
- The Collected Short Stories of Bharati Mukherjee (2023)

=== Memoir ===
- Days and Nights in Calcutta (1977, with Clark Blaise)

=== Non-fiction ===
- The Sorrow and the Terror: The Haunting Legacy of the Air India Tragedy (1987, with Clark Blaise)

== Awards and honors ==
- 1988: National Book Critics Circle Award (The Middleman and Other Stories).
- Mukherjee was awarded an honorary Doctor of Humane Letters (L.H.D.) from Whittier College in 2013.

== Related novels ==
- The Tortilla Curtain– T. C. Boyle
