= Clark Blaise =

Canadian-American writer (born 1940)

- Born: April 10, 1940 (age 86); Fargo, North Dakota
- Education: Denison University, University of Iowa
- Occupation: Writer
- Spouse: Bharati Mukherjee (d. 2017)
- Children: Two
- Writing career
- Language: English
- Notable awards: Officer of the Order of Canada (2009)

Clark Blaise, OC (born April 10, 1940) is a Canadian-American author. He was a professor of creative writing at York University, and a writer of short fiction. In 2010, he was named an Officer of the Order of Canada.

== Early life and education ==
Blaise was born in Fargo, North Dakota, to Canadian parents who lived in the United States. His mother, Anne Marion Vanstone, was English-Canadian and from Wawanesa, Manitoba, and his father, Leo Romeo Blaise, was of French-Canadian descent and was a furniture salesman and long-distance traveller. Later on, his father would inspire the father characters in Blaise's fiction. Growing up, his family moved constantly throughout the U.S. Before the eighth grade, he had already moved 30 times; ultimately, he attended 25 different schools. From ages six to ten, he lived in Florida. Throughout his childhood, Blaise also lived in Alabama, Georgia, communities in the American Midwest, Cincinnati, Pittsburgh, and Winnipeg. When Blaise was nineteen, his parents divorced.

He attended Denison University and the University of Iowa, graduating in 1961 and 1964 respectively. While at Denison University, he initially intended to pursue a major in geology but switched to English after taking a writing course in which he studied under Paul Bennett. While studying at Denison, he read extensively, began writing book reviews for the weekly newspaper, helped edit campus literary magazines, and received several campus writing awards.

== Career ==
In 1966, Blaise moved to Montreal and obtained Canadian citizenship. While living in Canada, Blaise published his first two short fiction collections, A North American Education (1973) and Tribal Justice (1974).

Blaise was the director of the International Writing Program. While living in Montreal in the early 1970s, he taught creative writing at Concordia University; he also joined with authors Raymond Fraser, Hugh Hood, John Metcalf and Ray Smith to form the Montreal Story Tellers Fiction Performance Group. Blaise and his wife Bharati Mukherjee collaborated on a memoir of experiences in India which was published in 1978.

In 1978, Blaise and Mukherjee moved to Toronto. Blaise became a professor of creative writing at York University, and wrote his first novel.

Mukherjee felt excluded in Canada, attributing it to racism and publishing an essay in Saturday Night. In 1980, the couple decided to return to the United States, moving to San Francisco. Both continued their literary careers, including a collaborative analysis of the 1985 bombing of Air India flight 182, known in India as the Kanishka bombing. Blaise wrote two more novels and a number of short stories.

== Personal life ==
He married writer Bharati Mukherjee in 1963. They met as students at the Iowa Writers' Workshop at the University of Iowa and had two sons. Mukherjee died in 2017. Blaise lives in New York.

== Honours and awards ==
In 2009, he was made an Officer of the Order of Canada "for his contributions to Canadian letters as an author, essayist, teacher, and founder of the post-graduate program in creative writing at Concordia University".

== Bibliography ==
=== Short story collections ===
- A North American Education – 1973
- Tribal Justice – 1974
- Resident Alien – 1986
- Man and His World – 1992
- Southern Stories – 2000
- Pittsburgh Stories – 2001
- Montreal Stories – 2003
- The Meagre Tarmac – 2011 (longlisted for the 2011 Scotiabank Giller Prize)

=== Novels ===
- Lunar Attractions – 1979 (winner of the 1980 Books in Canada First Novel Award)
- Lusts – 1984
- If I Were Me – 1997

=== Memoirs ===
- Days and Nights in Calcutta – 1977 (with Bharati Mukherjee)
- I had a Father – 1992

=== Non-fiction ===
- The Sorrow and the Terror: The Haunting Legacy of the Air India Tragedy – 1987 (with Bharati Mukherjee)
- Time Lord: Sir Sandford Fleming and the creation of standard time – 2000

=== Criticism ===
- A Novel of India's Coming of Age - The New York Times, April 19, 1981 (A review of Salman Rushdie's Midnight's Children)
