= Hugh Hood =

Canadian writer and university professor (1928–2000)

Hugh John Blagdon Hood, OC (b in Toronto, Ontario 30 April 1928 – d in Montreal, Quebec 1 August 2000) was a Canadian novelist, short story writer, essayist and university professor.

Hood wrote 32 books: 17 novels including the 12-volume New Age novel sequence (influenced by Marcel Proust and Anthony Powell), several volumes of short fiction, and 5 of nonfiction. He taught English literature at the Université de Montréal. In the early 1970s he and fellow authors Clark Blaise, Raymond Fraser, John Metcalf and Ray Smith formed the well-known Montreal Story Tellers Fiction Performance Group, which popularized the public reading of fiction in Canada. In 1988, he was made an Officer of the Order of Canada.

== Bibliography ==
=== Novels ===
- White Figure, White Ground (1964)
- The Camera Always Lies (1967)
- A Game of Touch (1970)
- You Can't Get There From Here (1972)
- Five New Facts about Giorgione (1987)

=== The New Age Series ===
1. The Swing in the Garden (1975)
2. A New Athens (1977)
3. Reservoir Ravine (1979)
4. Black and White Keys (1982)
5. The Scenic Art (1984)
6. The Motor Boys in Ottawa (1986)
7. Tony's Book (1988)
8. Property & Value (1990)
9. Be Sure to Close Your Eyes (1993)
10. Dead Men's Watches (1995)
11. Great Realizations (1997)
12. Near Water (2000)

=== Short stories ===
- Flying a Red Kite (1962)
  - in German: Der rote Drachen, in Ernst Bartsch ed.: Die weite Reise. Kanadische Erzählungen und Kurzgeschichten. Volk und Welt, Berlin 1976, pp 135 – 149
- Around the Mountain: Scenes from Montreal Life (1967)
- Getting to Williamstown (1970)
  - in German: Unterwegs nach Williamstown. Akzente. Zeitschrift für Literatur. 23, 3, June 1976. Carl Hanser, Munich
- The Fruit Man, The Meat Man & The Manager (1971)
- Dark Glasses (1976)
- Selected Stories (1978)
- None Genuine Without This Signature (1980)
- August Nights (1985)
- A Short Walk in the Rain (1989)
- The Isolation Booth (1991)
- You'll Catch Your Death (1992)

=== Non-Fiction ===
- Strength Down the Centre: The Jean Beliveau Story (1970)
- The Governor's Bridge is Closed (1973)
- Scoring: The Art of Hockey [Illus. Seymour Segal] (1979)
- Unsupported Assertions (1992)

== Bibliographies ==
- "A Bibliography of Works by and on Hugh Hood," in Before the Flood: Our Examination round His Factification for Incamination of Hugh Hood's Work in Progress, edited by J.R. (Tim) Struthers, Downsview, Ontario, ECW Press, 1979, and "Hugh Hood: An Annotated Bibliography" also by Struthers, in The Annotated Bibliography of Canada's Major Authors: Volume Five, edited by Robert Lecker and Jack David, Downsview, Ontario, ECW Press, 1984
- "Hood, Hugh (1928--)" by Allan Weiss, in his A Comprehensive Bibliography of English-Canadian Short Stories, 1950–1983, Toronto, ECW Press, 1988 .

== Manuscript collections ==
The University of Calgary Libraries, Alberta.

== Critical studies ==
- "Grace: The Novels of Hugh Hood" by Dennis Duffy, in Canadian Literature 47, 1971.
- "An Interview with Hugh Hood," in World Literature Written in English, (11)1, 1972, and "An Interview with Hugh Hood," in Le Chien d'or/The Golden Dog, 3, 1974, both by Victoria G. Hale.
- "An Interview with Hugh Hood," in 'Journal of Canadian Fiction (2)1, 1973, and "Space, Time and the Creative Imagination" in Journal of Canadian Fiction, 3(1), 1974, both by Pierre Cloutier.
- "Hugh Hood and His Expanding Universe," in Journal of Canadian Fiction, 3(1), 1974, and "Formal Coherence in the Art of Hugh Hood" in Studies in Canadian Literature, 2, 1977, both by Kent Thompson.
- "An Interview with Hugh Hood" by Robert Fulford, in The Tamarack Review, 66, 1975.
- "Near Proust and Yonge: That's Where Hugh Hood Grew Up and Why He's Making a 12-Novel Bid for Immortality" by Linda Sandler, in Books in Canada, December 1975.
- The Comedians: Hugh Hood and Rudy Wiebe by Patricia A. Morley, Toronto: Clarke Irwin, 1977.
- "Hugh Hood and John Mills in Epistolary Conversation" by Hugh Hood and John Mills, in The Fiddlehead, 116, 1978.
- "Hugh Hood" in Profiles in Canadian Literature, edited by Jeffrey M. Heath, vol. 2, Toronto: Dundurn, 1980, and "A Secular Liturgy: Hugh Hood's Aesthetics and Around the Mountain," in Studies in Canadian Literature, 10, 1985, both by J. R. (Tim) Struthers.
- "The Case for Hugh Hood," in An Independent Stance: Essays on English-Canadian Criticism and Fiction, Erin, Ontario: Porcupine's Quill, 1991, and "The Atmosphere of Deception: Hugh Hood's 'Going Out as a Ghost'," in Writers in Aspic, edited by John Metcalf, Montreal: Véhicule Press, 1988, and "Hugh Hood," in A Sense of Style: Studies in the Art of Fiction in English-Speaking Canada, Toronto: ECW, 1989, all by W. J. Keith.
- "Hugh Hood's Celebration of the Millennium's End" by Geoff Hancock, in Quill and Quire, November 1980.
- "Field of Vision: Hugh Hood and the Tradition of Wordsworth" by Anthony John Harding, in Canadian Literature, 94, 1982.
- "`Incarnational Art': Typology and Analogy in Hugh Hood's Fiction" by Barry Cameron, in The Fiddlehead, 133, 1982.
- On the Line: Readings in the Short Fiction of Clark Blaise, John Metcalf and Hugh Hood by Robert Lecker, Downsview, Ontario: ECW, 1982.
- "Tradition and Post-Colonialism: Hugh Hood and Martin Boyd" by Diana Brydon, in Mosaic: A Journal for the Interdisciplinary Study of Literature, 15(3), 1982.
- "Faith and Fiction: The Novels of Callaghan and Hood" by Barbara Helen Pell, in Journal of Canadian Studies, 18(2), 1983.
- Hugh Hood by Keith Garebian, Boston: Twayne, 1983.
- "Hugh Hood's Edenic Garden: Psychoanalysis Among the Flowerbeds" by Patrick J. Mahony with a reply by Hugh Hood, in Canadian Literature, 96, 1983.
- Hugh Hood and His Works, Toronto: ECW, 1985, and "Onward to the New Age," in Books in Canada, October 1990, both by Keith Garebian.
- Pilgrim's Progress: A Study of the Short Stories of Hugh Hood by Susan Copoloff-Mechanic, Toronto: ECW, 1988.
- "On the Trail of Hugh Hood: History and the Holocaust in Black and White Keys" by Dave Little, in Essays on Canadian Writing, 44, 1991.
- "Changing Metropolis and Urbs Eterna: Hugh Hood's 'The Village Inside'" by Simone Vauthier, in her Reverberations: Explorations in the Canadian Short Story, Concord, Ontario: House of Anansi, 1993.
- Canadian Classics: An Anthology of Short Stories, Toronto: McGraw-Hill Ryerson, 1993, and How Stories Mean, Erin, Ontario: Porcupine's Quill, 1993, both edited by John Metcalf and J. R. (Tim) Struthers.
- "A Scriptible Text" by John Mills, in Essays on Canadian Writing 50, 1993.
- "The History of Art and the Art of History: Hugh Hood's Five New Facts About Giorgione" by Alex Knoenagel, in Mosaic, 27(1), 1994.
- The Influence of Painting on Five Canadian Writers: Alice Munro, Hugh Hood, Timothy Findley, Margaret Atwood, and Michael Ondaatje by John Cooke, Lewiston, New York: Edwin Mellen, 1996.
