= John Metcalf (writer) =

Canadian writer, editor and critic

John Metcalf CM
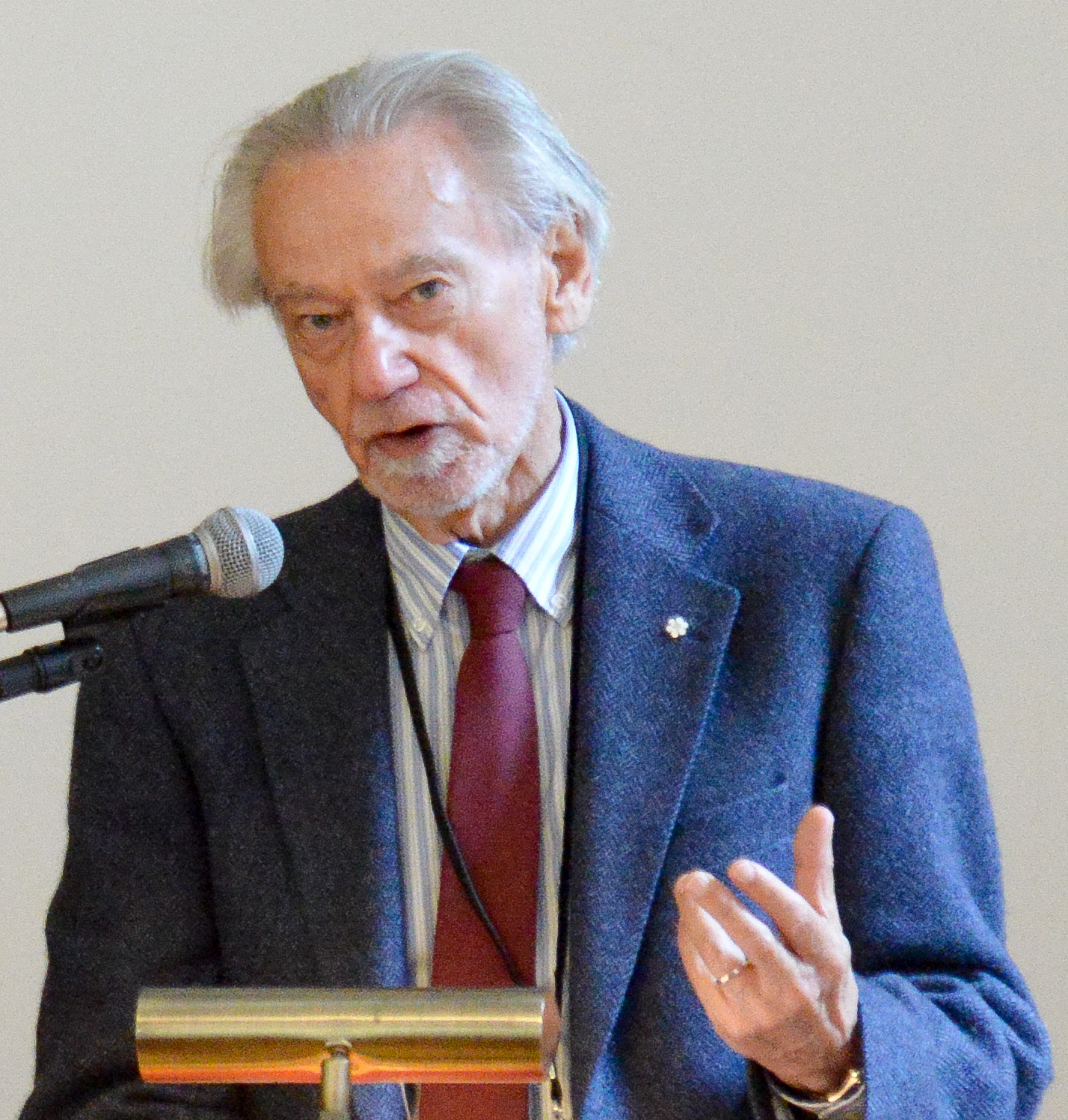
- Metcalf at the Eden Mills Writers' Festival in 2016
- Born: John Wesley Metcalf; 12 November 1938 (age 87); Carlisle, England
- Education: University of Bristol
- Occupations: Writer; critic; editor
- Spouse: Myrna Teitelbaum Metcalf
- Writing career
- Movement: Contemporary Canadian literature

John Wesley Metcalf (born 12 November 1938) is an English-born Canadian writer, editor and critic.

== Personal life ==
Metcalf was born in Carlisle, England, on 12 November 1938. His father, Thomas Metcalf, was a clergyman and his mother, Gladys Moore Metcalf, was a teacher. He immigrated to Canada in 1962 and here began to write. In 1975 he married Myrna Teitelbaum and now lives with her in Ottawa, Ontario.

== Education ==
Metcalf gained a Bachelor of Arts and a Certificate in Education from the University of Bristol, prior to his immigration to Canada.

== Writing career ==
Metcalf's first attempt at writing fiction came when he entered the CBC's Short Story Contest, which was followed by eight of his short stories being accepted by the Vancouver-based magazine Prism International. He supplemented his writing career with teaching jobs.

New Canadian Writing 1969 included Metcalf's first published stories. They followed a common theme of young people coming of age, which he has returned to several times throughout his works. His first novella, The Lady Who Stole Furniture, was published in 1970, shortly after New Canadian Writing 1969. The narrator deals with the morality and integrity of his intimate relationship with an older woman. This novella first showcased Metcalf's "skill with dialogue, the idiom and rhythms of speech", which is seen in most of his work.

Many of Metcalf's works follow characters modeled after himself, young English teachers who immigrated to Canada and are displeased with the educational system. His first novel, Going Down Slow, follows a young teacher as he deals with morality in the workplace, and his second novel, General Ludd, describes a similar character fighting the implementation of communications technology in his workplace. The Teeth of My Father is a collection of short stories with the common theme of artists' relationships with society, their artwork and their personal life. This theme was extended in Adult Entertainment. Girl in Gingham is a collection of two novellas. The first, Private Parts, chronicles one narrator's "sexual and spiritual childhood and adolescence". The second, Girl in Gingham, follows another narrator's search for the perfect mate via an online dating service, with the undertone being his realization that people try to invent themselves to fit what others want and the ideals of their culture. Short story and novella forms are his preferred form of writing.

Metcalf is a longtime critic of Canadian "cultural and educational inadequacies", and published Kicking Against the Pricks in 1982 to showcase this frustration. It is a collection of eight essays and includes an interview with himself. To encourage debate on this theme within the literary community, he published The Bumper Book in 1986 and followed it with Carry On Bumping in 1988. Both collections consist of contentious essays focussing on problems with Canadian literature. In an interview with Geoff Hancock, he asserted that "the quality of the education has declined everywhere over the last 50 years as the number to be educated has risen". He is in "conflict with the dominant nature of North American society" and the influence it has on education.

Metcalf has extensively contributed to Canadian literature through editing, teaching at various educational levels, critiquing other writers, compiling anthologies and publishing and promoting Canadian writers. He is known for his satires of Canadian life and academia.

== Awards ==
Forde Abroad won the 1996 gold medal for fiction at the National Magazine Awards. The Estuary won the University of Western Ontario's President's Medal for the Best Story of 1969. Metcalf was appointed as a Member of the Order of Canada in 2004.

== Selected works ==
- The Lady Who Sold Furniture, 1970
- Going Down Slow, 1972
- The Teeth of My Father, 1975
- Girl in Gingham, 1978
- General Ludd, 1981
- Kicking Against the Pricks, 1982
- Selected Stories, 1982
- Adult Entertainment, 1986
- What is a Canadian Literature?, 1988
- Shooting the Stars, 1992
- Freedom from Culture, 1993
- An Aesthetic Underground: A Literary Memoir, 2003
- Forde Abroad, 2003
- Standing Stones, 2004
- Shut Up He Explained: A Literary Memoir Volume II, 2007
- The Museum at the End of the World, 2016
