= Rudy Crew =

American education administrator

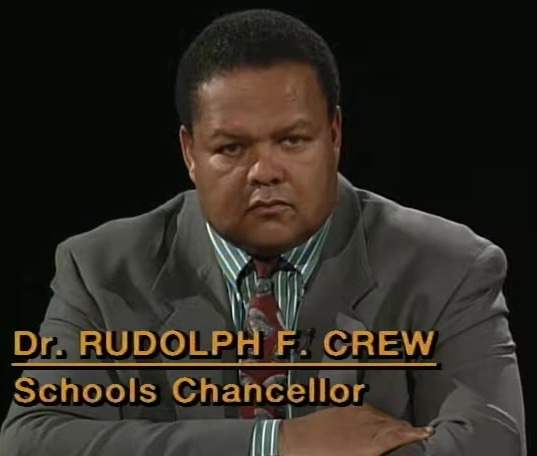
- Crew on CUNY TV's Urban Agenda, 1996

5th President of Medgar Evers College
- In office August 1, 2013 – February 27, 2021
- Preceded by: William Pollard
- Succeeded by: Patricia Ramsey

Oregon Chief Education Officer
- In office July 1, 2012 – July 1, 2013
- Governor: John Kitzhaber
- Preceded by: position established
- Succeeded by: Nancy Golden

Chancellor of the New York City Department of Education
- In office October 1995 – 1999
- Mayor: Rudy Giuliani
- Preceded by: Ramón C. Cortines
- Succeeded by: Harold Levy

Personal details
- Born: Rudolph Franklin Crew; September 10, 1950 (age 76) Poughkeepsie, New York
- Education: Babson College (BA); University of Massachusetts Amherst (MEd, EdD)
- Occupation: Educator, public school administrator

Rudolph Franklin "Rudy" Crew (born September 10, 1950) is an American educator, academic administrator, and former government employee who served as President of Medgar Evers College from 2013 to 2021. A lifelong educator and public school administrator, Crew served as Oregon's first Chief Education Officer in 2012 and 2013. Appointed by Governor John Kitzhaber, Crew oversaw the integrated public education system in Oregon from pre-kindergarten through college and career readiness.

Perhaps his most prominent job was as chancellor of the New York City Department of Education, a position he held from 1995 to 1999. He described John Crew as "second cousin, a former superintendent of the Baltimore schools," and his mentor.

== Early life and education ==
Crew was born on September 10, 1950, in Poughkeepsie, New York His mother died when he was two years old; his father, Eugene, a jazz trumpeter and night watchman, raised him.

Crew was the first male in his family to attend college, and he was among the African-American students that helped integrate Babson College as undergraduates.

After graduating from Babson he received a Master of Education and a Doctor of Education from the University of Massachusetts Amherst.

== Career ==
=== Southern California ===
Crew's first job was teaching English in Southern California. Crew began his career as a school administrator in Worcester, Massachusetts. He also worked in administrative positions in Boston, Massachusetts and was the assistant superintendent and superintendent of schools in Sacramento, California, holding the latter position from 1988 to 1993.

=== Tacoma ===
He left to lead the school system at Tacoma, Washington, where test scores improved during his tenure, drawing the attention of the New York City Board of Education, which had had six chancellors in ten years.

When looking at Crew's student achievement record, some point to one-year drops in test scores as a picture of his overall record. The Abt report concluded that Tacoma's 1995 increase in test scores was most likely a result of efforts to increase student test-taking skills, but Tacoma school officials believe the short-term gains were a result of Crew leaving for New York causing a setback in continued improvement. Peter Sacks, an author and journalist, said that Crew is one of a breed of superintendent who focuses on short-term gains that may not be good for the district in the long-term. However, in New York, reforms initiated during Crew's tenure have been credited with playing a role in the continually improving test scores that his successors have achieved.

=== New York City ===
Crew replaced Ramon C. Cortines in October 1995 as chancellor of New York City's Board of Education. Five months later he made it clear that he would not follow President Clinton's idea of making school uniforms mandatory. As chancellor of the nation's largest school district, Crew was referred to as the "other" Rudy, although there was a third Rudy: Deputy Mayor Rudy Washington.

He opposed Mayor Giuliani's plan to initiate a private school voucher system. The New York Times wrote that Giuliani "drove the chancellor out with a campaign of public criticism.

There has been substantial academic research on changes to oversight in New York City that indicate Crew's creation of a more autonomous "Chancellor's District" was effective turning around failing schools. In 2010, the Coalition for Educational Justice in New York City cited the Chancellor's District and Crew's School Improvement Zone in Miami as a framework for their School Transformation Zone.

During Crew's tenure, his administration was marred by a 1997 report by Edward F. Stancik, the Special Commissioner of Investigation, which questioned school administrators for not following procedures and delaying the report of a rape of a 14-year-old girl, which was the third instance in that high school. In response to the report, Crew initiated due process procedures to determine disciplinary action for the administrators involved. Crew was later blamed for organizing efforts to remove independent oversight and engaging in a campaign to have Stancik removed by accusing him of exaggerating his reports saying they were overly dramatic and adversely affected the school system.

After steadily rising for several years, math and science scores dropped in 1997, as a result of new tests and higher standards. At the time, Mayor Giuliani placed blame on the school board and the dysfunctional system itself.

After leaving New York, Crew led a leadership program for school principals at the University of Washington for 15 months, then took a leadership position at the Stupski Foundation in the San Francisco Bay Area.

=== Miami-Dade ===
In 2004, Crew took over as Superintendent of Miami-Dade County Public Schools, the nation's fourth-largest school district, where his reported $400,000 salary made him the highest-paid superintendent in the country. In 2005 and in 2007 Crew's name was floated as a potential superintendent of District of Columbia Public Schools.

Crew's leadership in Miami was reflected in recognition as a finalist for the Broad Prize for three consecutive years (2006–08), and in School Improvement Zone being named a Top 50 Innovation by the Kennedy School of Government Ash Institute, 12 high schools being named among the best by Newsweek, Crew was named the 2008 National Superintendent of the Year by the American Association of School Administrators. His initiatives were said to have led the District to be viewed nationally as a model of success with the secondary-school reform program being credited with Miami's graduation-rate boost.

Crew also garnered controversy. His administration was involved in not reporting a crime and obstructing the investigation involving the sexual assault of a 14-year-old female student by a football player, who was later charged with lewd and lascivious assault on a minor. A civil suit was brought against Crew by the former Miami-Dade County Public Schools Inspector General, Herbert Cousins, a former FBI agent who alleged Crew and his staff slandered and defamed him to obstruct his investigation and disclosure of illegal activities by Crew and some board members.

Crew's critics pointed to an increase in "F" schools during 2007 that was actually a statewide phenomenon caused by a change in the school grading formula. The Greater-Miami Chamber of Commerce stated that Crew's success was reflected in the District's performance on the FCAT, which continues a trend that adds up to significant improvement over the last five years.

In June 2008, the Miami Herald reported that Crew's School Improvement Zone generated few noteworthy achievements in its first year. One school board member stated, "We spent $100 million and it didn't do anything. To me, that's a complete failure." Defenders of the program note that over the project's three-year history, substantial gains have been made, including the percentage of "D" and "F" schools dropping from 90% in 2005 to 22% in 2007. One principal credited the initiative with helping her school raise its grade from a "D" to an "A" in three years.

At a June 2008 Miami-Dade County school board meeting, Crew said the district had overspent millions of dollars during the past two years because it had hired more teachers than budgeted, lost state funding, and encountered rising costs. School Board member Renier Diaz De La Portilla called for Crew's ouster, criticizing the way he has managed the schools' budget. Ana Rivas Logan, another board member, called Crew "insubordinate." At an August 4, 2008 school board meeting, the item to terminate Crew's contract failed. Despite Crew's strong support from business and community leaders, the School Board bought out his contract at its September 10, 2008 meeting, and was replaced by Alberto Carvalho.

In 2009, the district's improved performance continued, and Miami high school students made greater gains than their peers statewide.

=== Oregon ===
Prior to Crew's move to Oregon, Governor John Kitzhaber led a successful effort to abolish the 148-year-old elected Oregon Superintendent of Public Instruction and establish a 12-member Oregon Education Investment Board, which eventually hired Crew as the state's first Chief Education Officer. His contract with the state paid him more than the combined salaries of the governor, state treasurer and secretary of state. One year into his three-year commitment with the state, Crew resigned as Chief Education Officer when he accepted the position to lead Medgar Evers College, City University of New York, in Brooklyn. After his resignation, controversy arose over his frequent out-of-state trips on personal business and his attempts to be reimbursed for first-class air travel, which were against the state's travel rules.

== Personal ==
"Married second wife, Kathy Byrne (a mental health professional), 1992." Crew has four children from his first wife, Angela. They divorced, and she subsequently died in 1999. He and his second wife have three step-children.

== Bibliography ==
- Only Connect: The Way to Save Our Schools. New York, Farrar, Straus and Giroux. (2007) ISBN 0-374-29401-1

== Notes ==
Educational offices
Preceded by Ramon C. Cortines	Schools Chancellor of New York City; 1995-1999	Succeeded by Harold O. Levy
