= Elizabeth Nunez =

American novelist (1944–2024)

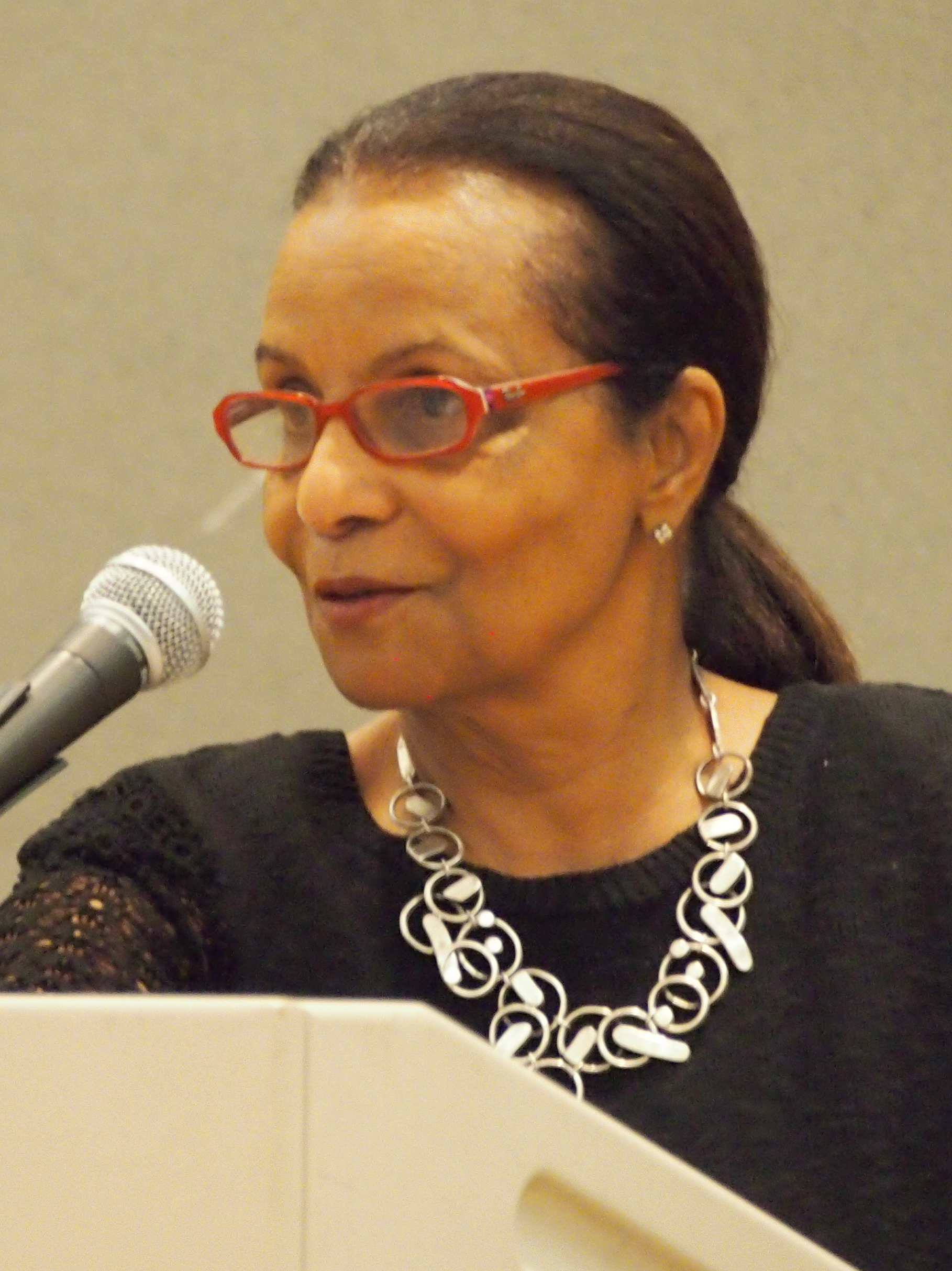
- Nunez in 2016
- Born: 18 February 1944; Cocorite, Trinidad and Tobago
- Died: 8 November 2024 (aged 80); Brooklyn, New York, U.S.
- Education: Marian College (BA); New York University (MA, PhD)
- Occupation: Professor
- Writing career
- Genres: Novel, memoir

Signature
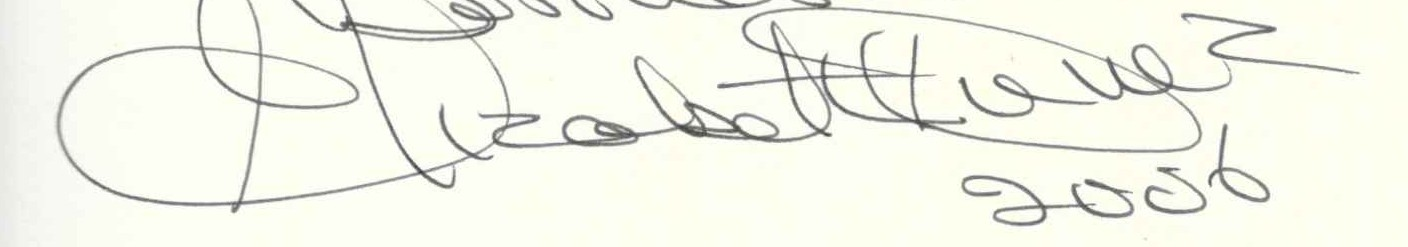

Elizabeth Nunez (18 February 1944 – 8 November 2024) was a Trinidadian-American novelist academic who was a Distinguished Professor of English at Hunter College, New York City.

Her novels have won a number of awards: Prospero's Daughter received The New York Times Editors' Choice and 2006 Novel of the Year from Black Issues Book Review, Bruised Hibiscus won the 2001 American Book Award, and Beyond the Limbo Silence won the 1999 Independent Publishers Book Award.

In addition, Nunez was shortlisted for the Hurston/Wright Legacy Award for Discretion; Boundaries was selected as a New York Times Editors' Choice and nominated for a 2012 NAACP Image Award; and Anna In-Between was selected for the 2010 PEN Oakland Josephine Miles Award for literary excellence as well as a New York Times Editors' Choice, and received starred reviews from Publishers Weekly, Booklist, and Library Journal. Nunez is a contributor to the 2019 anthology New Daughters of Africa edited by Margaret Busby.

== Biography ==
=== Early life ===
Nunez was born in Cocorite, Trinidad, on 18 February 1944. She began writing as early as nine years of age and won the first-place prize for the "Tiny Tots" writing contest in the Trinidad Guardian. She emigrated from Trinidad to the United States after completing high school at the age of 19 in 1963.

=== Career overview ===
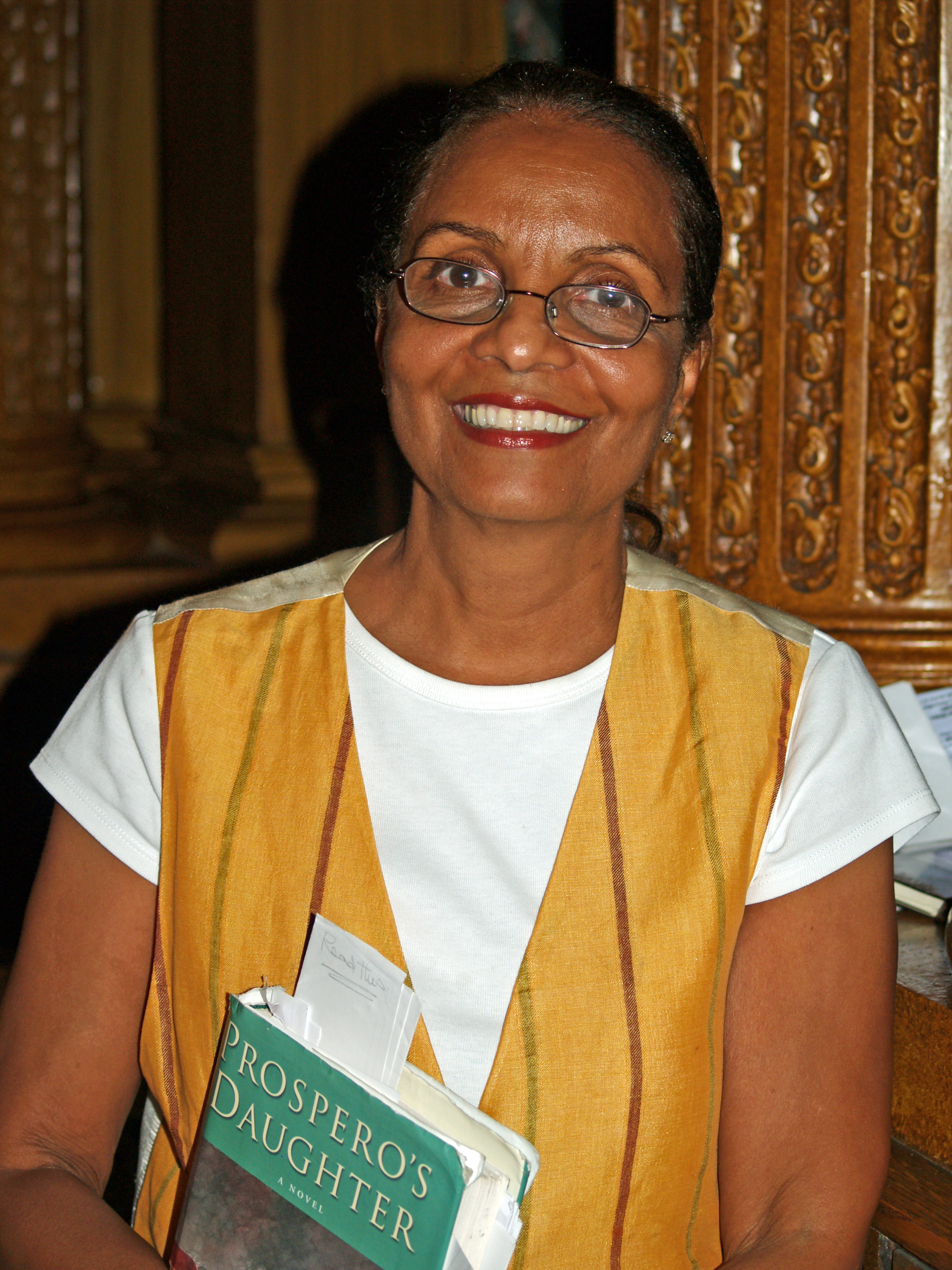
Nunez at the 2008 Brooklyn Book Festival.

Having arrived in the United States aged 19, Nunez earned a BA in English from Marian College in Fond du Lac, Wisconsin, and an MA and PhD in Literature from New York University. She began teaching at Medgar Evers College in 1972, a year after the college was established, and was instrumental in developing its writing curriculum. She was a Distinguished Professor at Hunter College, where she taught courses on Caribbean Women Writers and Creative Writing.

The author of eight novels, she was also co-editor with Jennifer Sparrow of Stories from Blue Latitudes: Caribbean Women Writers at Home and Abroad, co-editor with Brenda M. Greene of the collection of essays Defining Ourselves: Black Writers in the 90s, and author of several monographs of literary criticism. Her memoir "Discovering my Mother" was published in the 2019 anthology New Daughters of Africa edited by Margaret Busby.

In addition to developing her writing and teaching career, Nunez developed programming to support other writers of color. She was the co-founder of the National Black Writers Conference, which received funding from the National Endowment for the Humanities, The Nathan Cummings Foundation, and the Reed Foundation under her direction as its co-director from 1986 to 2000. Nunez also hosted a radio program on WBAI 99.5FM and is chair of the PEN Open Book Award Committee.

Nunez was also the Executive Producer of the 2004 New York Emmy-nominated CUNY TV series Black Writers in America.

Her 2010 novel, Anna In Between, earned her critical acclaim. Publishers Weekly praised it for "[the] expressive prose and convincing characters that immediately hook the reader" and for handling family conflicts and immigration identity vividly. Her final novels were Not for Everyday Use (2014) and Now Lila Knows (2022).

=== Death ===
Nunez died on 8 November 2024 from complications of a stroke at her home in Brooklyn, New York, at the age of 80.

== Selected novels ==
- When Rocks Dance (1986)
- Beyond the Limbo Silence (1998)
- Bruised Hibiscus (2000)
- Grace (2003)
- Prospero's Daughter (2006)
- Anna In Between (2010)
- Not for Everyday Use (2014)
- Now Lila Knows (2022)
