= The In-Between World of Vikram Lall =

2003 novel by M. G. Vassanji

- First edition
- Author: M. G. Vassanji
- Language: English
- Genre: Historical Fiction
- Publisher: Doubleday Canada
- Publication date: 11 October 2003
- Publication place: Canada
- Media type: Print (Hardback & Paperback)
- Pages: 405
- ISBN: 0-385-65990-3

The In-Between World of Vikram Lall is a novel by M. G. Vassanji, published in 2003 by Doubleday Canada. The novel won the Scotiabank Giller Prize that year and narrates a story of Vikram Lall in the colonial and post-colonial Kenya. The title for the novel also inspired the title for Elizabeth Nunez's novel Anna In-Between, published in 2009.

== Plot ==
Vikram Lall is an adult living in exile in Canada and the novel plots him contemplating over his life as a teenager of Indian origin living in Kenya in the 1950s. Vikram's paternal grandfather was brought to Africa from Northwest India as a laborer on the railways, while his father Ashok was born in Africa and became a member of the Asian Home Guard troops that worked for the British. His mother, Sheila, the daughter of a police inspector, was born in India and moved to Africa after marrying Ashok. Both Vikram and his younger sister, Deepa, were also born in Africa and reside in the town of Nakuru. While Ashok strives to emulate the British colonists, their maternal uncle Mahesh disrupts their household with his support for the radical Mau Mau group seeking to overturn British rule.

While growing up in colonial Kenya, Vik and Deepa befriend Njoroge, a Kikuyu child whose grandfather Mwangi works as a labourer in the Lalls' household, and British siblings, Bill and Annie Bruce, whose mother frequents Ashok's grocery store for British goods. When Mau Mau Uprising gains momentum, the Bruces are killed. Because of Vikram's particular attachment to Annie, he remains affected by her death even until adulthood, especially because he secretly witnesses Mahesh stealing Ashok's gun to give to the rebels. Mwangi is later arrested and killed by the British for his involvement in the Mau Mau group while Mahesh is later deported to India. Seeking a more peaceful place to live, the Lalls move to Nairobi, which separates them from Njoroge.

As teenagers, Vik and Deepa reconnect with Njoroge, who is now a rising star in the new government led by Jomo Kenyatta. It becomes clear that Deepa and Njoroge are in love, but Sheila is adamantly opposed to their relationship and persuades Njoroge to give up on Deepa. Devastated by Njoroge's rejection, Deepa marries another suitor and apparently settles down, while Njoroge marries a Kikuyu woman and continues to be an idealistic voice in government. While Vik begins as a railway inspector, he finds himself moving up in the bureaucratic ladder as his superiors take advantage of his status as an Asian man in Africa - having neither native African roots nor strong ties to the former British rule - to fuel their increasingly corrupt activities as a middleman who takes bribes and launders currency. Though Vik is stunned by the political influence he gains, he is soon tossed aside as a scapegoat by his superior when a scam is opposed. He takes up a position in his in-laws jewellery business, but his connections continue follow him and he becomes known as one of the most corrupt men in Africa.

As the years go by, Vik's parents are gradually driven apart, though they briefly become closer again when Sheila is diagnosed with breast cancer. Deepa and Njoroge meet again as friends, though their past feelings remain strong and rumours begin to circulate that they are having an affair. When Njoroge's mentor and political opponent to Jomo Kenyatta is killed, Njoroge's idealism makes him a target and he is killed at Deepa's shop. Deepa mourns his death for years, but when her husband Dilip dies, the scandals around Njoroge and Dilip's deaths isolate her and she chooses to immigrate to the United States where her two grown children reside. Vik's increased involvement in various political scandals endangers the lives of family members; his wife separates from him and takes their children to England, while Vik flees to Canada.

In present, Vik attempts to atone for Njoroge's death by looking out for Njoroge's son, Joseph, who has come to Canada. When Joseph suddenly returns to Kenya and is arrested for his participation in a violent political protest, Vik chooses to return to Africa to leverage his account of the most notorious scandal he was involved in in order to secure Joseph's release. Though he succeeds in obtaining Joseph's release, Vik's chance for a fresh start is overturned when the investigating committee is abruptly dissolved and he is left vulnerable to his enemies hoping to keep their corruption secret. With his lawyer arrested, Vikram is left in hiding when his apartment building is set ablaze, leaving his fate ambiguous.

== Publication ==
The novel is fifth by Vassanji and was published on 11 October 2003 by Doubleday Canada. It is divided into four parts spread over four decades and begins with Coronation of Queen Elizabeth II in 1953. Vassanji who was born in Kenya dedicated the novel as a tribute to East Africa's Indian population and their contributions to the railroad and the politics of Kenya. In 2016, Vassanji went on a tour organized by Storymoja Festival in Kenya and Nairobi, on which the novel's plot is based on. Vassanji took part in book signing and discussions with teachers and students. The novel was later published in the digital form as an e-book.

== Review and reception ==
Author Elizabeth Nunez, who grew up in Trinidad and later moved to America noted on how she relates with the story of being straddled in the two different worlds. She appreciates the novel for capturing the essence of a life in a post-colonial country. She later wrote a novel Anna In-Between (2010, ISBN 978-1-936070-69-5) about a character struggling in two identities and said that "[she] just stole Vassanji's line, 'in-between'". Novelist Sandra Hunter writing for The Guardian included the book in top 10 list revolving around Indian families. Helon Habila of The Guardian notes that the novel's first part is slow in pace but it is about political and personal survival and is "a good example of how the post-colonial novel should be written, dispassionately, avoiding the easy pitfalls of nostalgia and essentialism". An American weekly, Publishers Weekly, in their review mentions that Vassanji has explored "a conflict of epic proportions from the perspective of a man trapped in 'the perilous in-between'". The New Yorker reviews the novel as "tautly written" and mentions that the narrative built for the lead characters seems "forced". It also notes that "the book admirably captures the tenor of the postcolonial period". Tara Sehgal of India Today mentions that "Though issues of race, class, identity and belonging loom large and politics permeates every page, [the novel] is also simply a "life and times" story of Vic [aka Vikram]".

== Awards ==
The novel was shortlisted for the 2003 Scotiabank Giller Prize eventually winning against Oryx and Crake (by Margaret Atwood), The Island Walkers (by John Bemrose), Kilter: 55 Fictions (by John Gould), and The Way the Crow Flies (by Ann-Marie MacDonald). The awards were adjudged by Canadian jurist Rosalie Abella, critic and writer David Staines, and author and professor Rudy Wiebe. Vassanji had earlier won the inaugural award in 1994 for his novel The Book of Secrets.
