= Nkiru Center for Education and Culture =

Coordinates: 40.6761°N 73.9637°W

- Type: non-profit organization
- Location: Brooklyn
- Key people: Talib Kweli, Yasiin Bey
- Website: Nkiru Books

Nkiru Books was one of the longest operating African-American bookstores in Brooklyn, New York City, United States. Founded by Leothy Miller Owens in 1976, the bookstore was bought by Talib Kweli and Mos Def in 2000. Thereafter it was operated as the Nkiru Center for Education and Culture, a nonprofit organization promoting literacy and multicultural awareness for people of color. In its last incarnation it was located at 732 Washington Avenue.

== History ==
In 1976 Leothy Miller Owens was a young educator when she started Nkiru in her home. At the time, Brooklyn had several African American bookstores, including Richardson's Afro-American Book Store, the Freedom Bookstore, and Akiba Mkuu, founded by the black-nationalist organization The East. Within a short period of time the store expanded into its own space at 76 St. Marks Place. Ms. Miller Owens died in 1992. Her mother, Adelaide Miller, ran the store from 1992 to 1999, when the store came into severe financial distress.

In the early 1990s, while in his teens, Talib Kweli worked at a different local bookstore in Brooklyn that sold mainstream books. While there he became concerned about the absence of literature for African Americans, and sought to work at Nkiru instead. Initially, there were no positions available; however, Kweli made a strong pitch for a job, and soon a part-time spot was offered to him. Becoming intimately acquainted with the store, Kweli decided that if he ever had any money, Nkiru would be where he invested it.

In 1998, after the release of their joint album Mos Def & Talib Kweli Are Black Star, Mos Def and Talib Kweli decided to purchase the store. That year they held a massive fund raiser, generating money to relocate Nkiru in October 2000. With the move to 732 Washington Avenue in Brooklyn, they made the business into a nonprofit organization, naming it the Nkiru Center for Education and Culture.

The non-profit Nkiru Center for Education and Culture organized literacy projects and conducts workshops, storytelling, and lectures. Starting in 2000, Nkiru has hosted open mics and spoken word poetry sessions. The store offered titles from African, Latino and Caribbean writers, including many children's books. Nkiru is no longer available as a physical shop, but continues business online as part of Talib Kweli's KweliClub.

== Mission ==
The mission of the Nkiru Center for Education & Culture, Inc. was to serve as an educational and multicultural resource in the Brooklyn community. Its purposes were to improve literacy and to provide a community-oriented meeting place that promotes multicultural education and awareness with a special emphasis on the contributions of African Americans to literature, history, music, art, and the sciences.

== Structure ==
As a nonprofit organization, the Nkiru Center was operated by a volunteer board of directors. In 2003, the chairperson was Brenda M. Greene, also a professor of English at Medgar Evers College an adjunct professor in the graduate school at New York University, and Kweli's mother. Angeli Rasbury has been the executive director in the past. Nkiru has also won funding from a variety of donors, including the Ford Foundation.

== See also ==
- Culture in Brooklyn
