= Jamal Greene =

American legal scholar

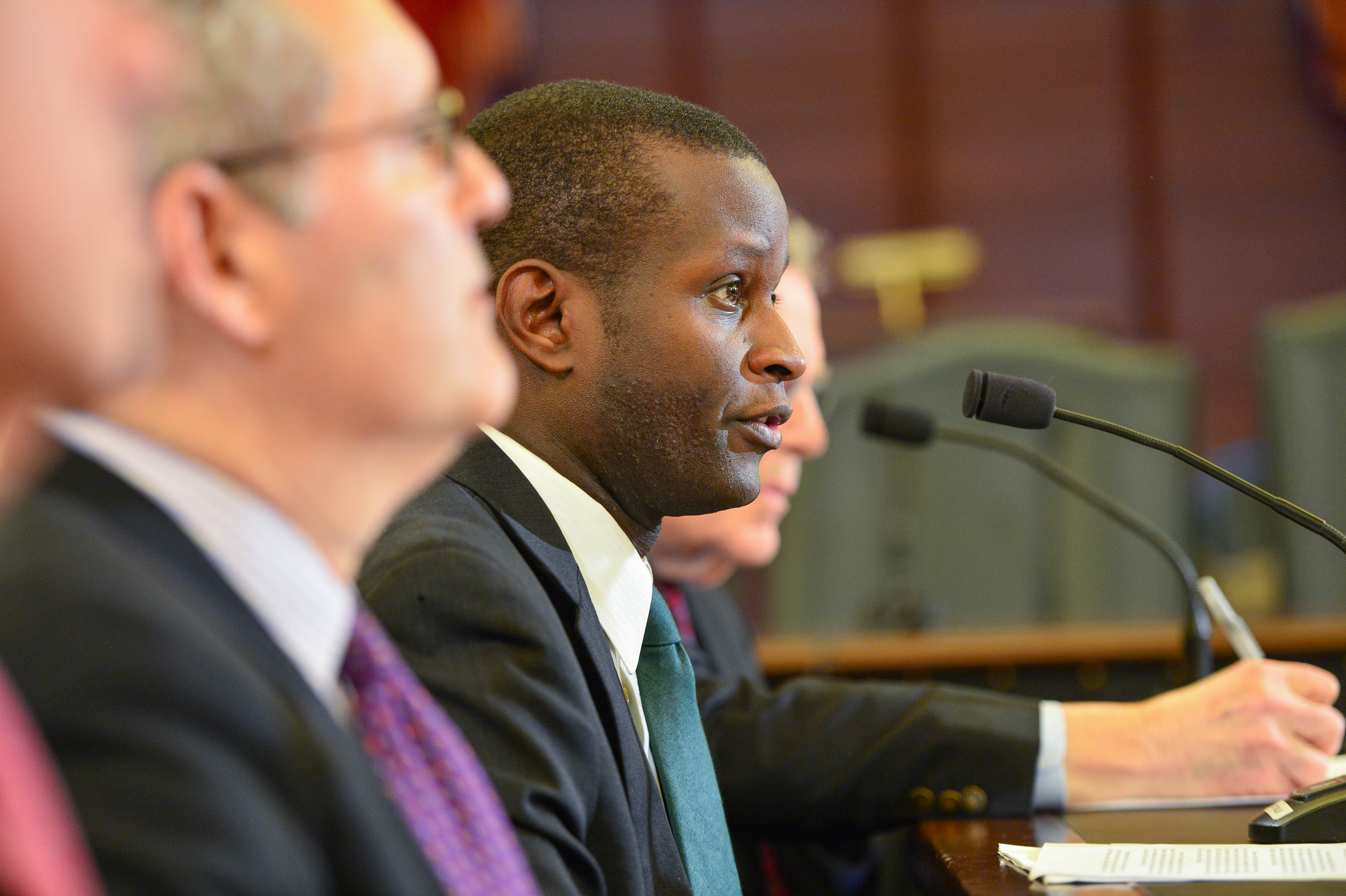
- Born: Brooklyn, New York
- Occupations: Law professor, author
- Relatives: Brenda M. Greene (mother); Talib Kweli (brother)

Academic background
- Education: Harvard University (BA); Yale University (JD)

Academic work
- Institutions: Columbia University
- Greene's voice On free speech cases

Jamal K. Greene is an American legal scholar whose scholarship focuses on constitutional law. He is the Dwight Professor of Law at Columbia Law School. Greene was one of four inaugural co-chairs of Facebook's Oversight Board, a body that adjudicates Facebook's content moderation decisions.

== Early life and education ==
Greene was raised in Park Slope, Brooklyn, New York City. His mother, Brenda Greene, is an English professor at Medgar Evers College of the City University of New York, and his father is an administrator at Adelphi University. His brother is the rapper Talib Kweli. Greene attended Hunter College High School, where he was a center fielder for the school baseball team. He obtained a B.A. from Harvard College in 1999, where he was a sports writer for The Harvard Crimson. One of his last pieces for that publication reflected on his experience as a "black kid from Brooklyn" spending four years "in the Ivy bubble".

After graduation, Greene worked at Sports Illustrated. He received a JD from Yale Law School in 2005 and clerked for Judge Guido Calabresi of the United States Court of Appeals for the Second Circuit, from 2005 to 2006, and for Justice John Paul Stevens of the Supreme Court of the United States, from 2006 to 2007.

== Academic career ==
In 2008, Greene joined the Columbia Law School faculty.

== Other jobs ==
In 2020, he was named to Facebook's Oversight Board, an entity established to provide occasional precedential decisions regarding selected appeals of content decisions made by the company. He left the Board in January 2023.

== Writing ==
Greene is the author of How Rights Went Wrong: Why Our Obsession With Rights Is Tearing America Apart (2021). The book argues that United States constitutional law inappropriately grants strong protection to a small set of constitutional rights, as opposed to more limited protection to a broader set of rights. He further argues that this approach has hardened positions and reduced the ability for those with differing views to compromise. The work praises proportionality review as an alternative to American constitutional adjudication.

His additional writings in articles and book chapters include: "Selling Originalism"; "Giving the Constitution to the Courts", a review of Keith E. Whittington's Political Foundations of Judicial Supremacy: The Presidency, The Supreme Court, and Constitutional Leadership in U.S. History; "Beyond Lawrence: Metaprivacy and Punishment"; "Lawrence and the Right to Metaprivacy"; "Divorcing Marriage from Procreation"; "Judging Partisan Gerrymanders Under the Elections Clause"; "Hands Off Policy: Equal Protection and the Contact Sports Exemption of Title IX"; and "Disappearing Dilemmas: Judicial Construction of Ethical Choice as Strategic Behavior in the Criminal Defense Context".

== See also ==
- List of law clerks for the fourth seat of the Supreme Court of the United States
