= Esmeralda Simmons =

American civil rights attorney

Esmeralda Simmons is a civil rights attorney and executive director of the Center for Law and Social Justice at Medgar Evers College in Brooklyn, New York. Simmons founded the center in 1986. In 2014, she was named a New York State Woman Of Distinction, and in 2018 she received the Haywood Burns Award from the New York State Bar Association.

Simmons has served in "public services" at the city, state, and federal levels: in the Office for Civil Rights in the U.S. Department of Education, as an assistant Attorney General for the state of New York, as the first deputy state commissioner of human rights for New York state, and as the vice chairman of a New York city commission for redrawing city council district lines. In 1993, she was appointed to the New York City Board of Education by mayor David Dinkins.

== Early life and education ==
Raised in Brooklyn by parents who had immigrated from St. Croix in the Virgin Islands, Simmons cites the "culture shock" of moving from public housing in a predominantly Black neighborhood to a majority white area as an influence in her pursuit of civil and racial justice work.

She is a graduate of Hunter College of the City University of New York, and Brooklyn Law School, and was a Revson Fellow at Columbia University. She now teaches law and how to identify human rights violations.
