= Harold O. Levy =

American lawyer

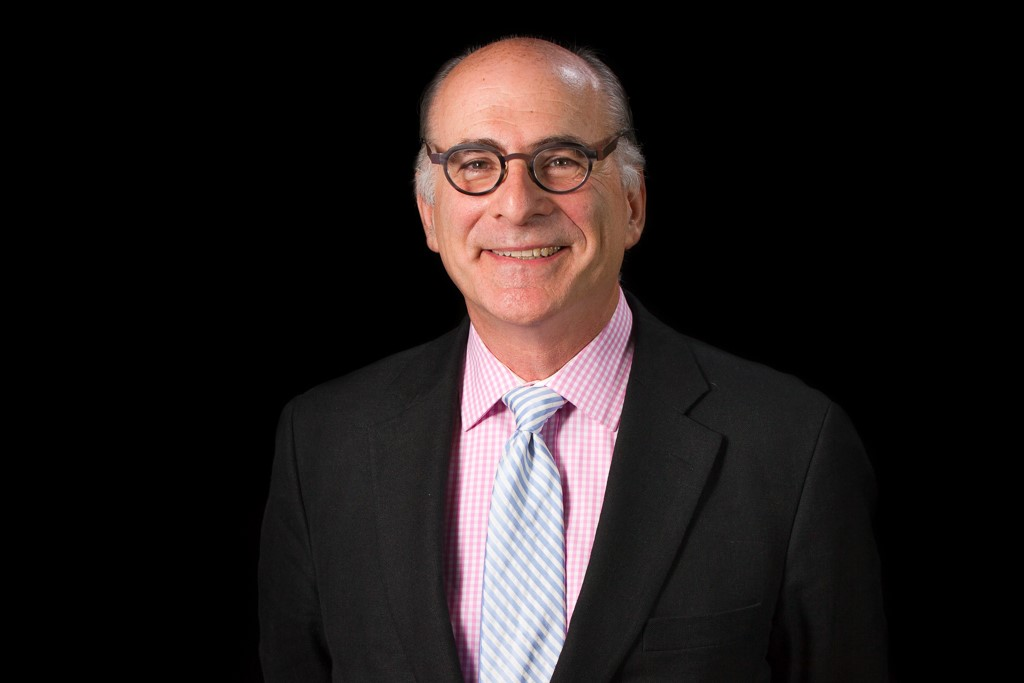

Chancellor of the New York City Department of Education
- In office 2000–2002
- Mayor: Michael Bloomberg
- Preceded by: Rudy Crew
- Succeeded by: Joel Klein

Personal details
- Born: December 14, 1952 New York City, U.S.
- Died: November 27, 2018 (aged 65) Manhattan, New York City, U.S.
- Education: Cornell University (B.S., J.D.); Oxford University (M.A.)
- Occupation: Executive director School chancellor Lawyer

Harold Oscar Levy (December 14, 1952 – November 27, 2018) was an American lawyer and philanthropist who last served as the executive director of the Jack Kent Cooke Foundation. Having previously held leadership roles as a corporate attorney, venture capital investor and as a manager in the financial services industry, Levy is best known for having served as Chancellor of the New York City public schools, the largest school system in the U.S., from 2000 to 2002.

== Early life and education ==
Levy's parents were Jewish refugees from Nazi Germany. His father, a former textile merchant in Trier, Germany, owned a hardware store on East 59th Street, and the family lived in the Washington Heights neighborhood. A student leader throughout his education, he graduated from the Bronx High School of Science in 1970. He earned a B.S in 1974 from Cornell University's School of Industrial & Labor Relations. During his time at Cornell, he resided in the Telluride House. He then earned a master's degree in Politics, Philosophy and Economics in 1978 from Oxford University, and J.D. in 1979 from Cornell Law School.

== Wall Street career (1985–2000) ==
During the first period of his career, Levy worked on Wall Street providing legal advice to Citigroup, Inc. and its predecessors, Traveler's Group, Inc., Salomon, Inc. and Philipp Brothers, Inc. He was the associate general counsel and handled special assignments, including serving as Citigroup's director of global compliance, Salomon Brothers' senior litigation counsel, and serving as liaison to community groups, including Reverend Jesse Jackson's Rainbow / Push Wall Street Project.

During this time, he also began his advocacy for public education, becoming a one-man lobbyist for the public schools. He served as President of University Settlement, New York's oldest social settlement, located on New York's Lower East Side. He was also chair of the City Bar Association's Committee on Education and pro bono counsel to a number of community organizations.

Chancellor Ramon Cortines appointed Levy chair of the New York City Commission on School Facilities and Maintenance Reform. The commission concluded the schools needed billions in new investment, drawing Levy further into the struggle to improve education in New York City. The commission's lobbying led to a massive infusion of funds to rehabilitate the city school buildings, as a result of which the school system ended its reliance on coal-fired boilers. The New York State Legislature subsequently elected Levy to be a member of the New York State Board of Regents.

== New York City School Chancellor (2000–2002) ==
Levy became New York City School Chancellor in 2000, managing a $13 billion budget. He served for nearly three years, including during 9/11. The system is the nation's largest, at the time serving 1.1 million students. It currently has more than 1,800 schools.

Levy's tenure as chancellor was marked by significant reform and a number of positive results. The first non-educator to serve in the office, he imposed management accountability metrics; overhauled teacher recruitment; in collaboration with the UFT, the teachers' union, he ended the practice of hiring teachers on "emergency credentials"; and he started the much-emulated Teaching Fellows program.

Although he is well known for being plain-spoken and blunt, he largely tried to avoid politics and controversial issues when possible in favor of his practical, data-driven reforms. The New York City Board of Education voted 4 to 3 to make Levy interim chancellor, a move opposed by then-mayor Rudy Giuliani. However, Levy's business-like approach eventually engendered a mutual respect with Giuliani and other skeptics, and he was unanimously voted permanent chancellor after five months on the job.

The subsequent programs he implemented were characteristically student-centered. He instituted the first K-12 student information reporting system, established the first new selective public high schools in over 60 years, and created programs offering students college-level instruction. He also ran what remains the country's largest summer school with over 300,000 students, which was subsequently recognized to have been among the most cost-effective interventions for low performing students. Reading and math scores rose considerably during his time in office, including the largest-ever one-year gain in math scores.

Levy left the office of chancellor in August 2002 after overseeing a friendly transition to his successor, Joel Klein.

== Later career (2002–2014) ==
Following his departure from the chancellor's office, Levy continued to promote innovation in education. He became a member of the senior management team of Kaplan, Inc., at a time that it was owned by The Washington Post, and subsequently joined its Higher Education Division, which included over 70 for-profit campuses and an online university with over 60,000 students. He founded Kaplan University's online School of Education, which focused on training special education and math teachers. Levy was a member of the board of Hesser College and Kaplan University. He was also a trustee of Pace University.

In 2010, U.S. Education Secretary Arne Duncan appointed Levy to the Committee on Measures of Student Success. Levy currently serves on several corporate and philanthropic boards, including Cambium Learning Group, MetSchools, and the American College of Greece. Mr. Levy received numerous awards and honors, was an adjunct professor at Columbia University, and is the author of numerous articles and editorials.

Later, Levy was a managing director and education practice head for Palm Ventures, LLC, from 2010 to 2014. The firm invests in businesses with a transformative social impact, including for-profit schools such as Cogswell Polytechnical College and Nightingale College, and education technology businesses such as Producteev, LateNiteLabs, and FIRE Solutions.

Then, he was a member of College Promise Campaign National Advisory Board, whose mission includes "advocating for free community college, as well as degree and certificate completion for responsible students."

== Jack Kent Cooke Foundation ==
In August 2014, the Jack Kent Cooke Foundation announced that Levy had been named executive director effective September 1. Levy lead the foundation's efforts to support high-performing, low-income students.

The Cooke Foundation is a private, independent foundation dedicated to advancing the education of exceptionally promising students who have financial need. Founded in 2000 by the estate of the late Jack Kent Cooke, the Cooke Foundation has awarded over $152 million in scholarships to nearly 2,200 students from 8th grade through graduate school, and over $90 million in grants to organizations that serve such students. The foundation's endowment was worth $641 million as of July 2016.

Under Levy's leadership, the Cooke Foundation dramatically increased the number of talented low-income students applying for Cooke Scholarships and has drawn national attention to the achievements of Cooke Scholars, who have defied stereotypes by graduating from top colleges and universities at the same rate as more affluent students.

The Cooke Foundation's groundbreaking education research and media coverage for the research have also increased since Levy became executive director in 2014. In addition, he started a new scholarship that enables Cooke Scholars to pursue graduate degrees at Oxford and Cambridge universities.

Leading Cooke Foundation efforts to bring about equal opportunity in college admissions for outstanding low-income students across the United States, Levy traveled around the nation and appeared in the media to discuss unjustified barriers that keep many academically qualified low-income students out of top colleges and universities. He has met with policymakers, business leaders and educators.

The first-ever national convening of the principals of selective public high schools was organized by Levy in 2015 on the topic "Closing the Excellence Gap: Nurturing Talent of High-Achieving, Low-Income High School Students." The conference led to the creation of the Coalition of Leaders for Advanced Student Success (CLASS), which works to ensure that the nation's brightest students, regardless of income, have the skills and knowledge to succeed in school and the workforce. A second conference was held in February 2016.

The Cooke Foundation now awards an annual $1 million Cooke Prize for Equity in Educational Excellence, recognizing a college that has made strides in enrolling low-income students and supporting them to successful graduation.

== Personal life ==
In 1986, Levy married Patricia Sapinsley, an architect who now works in the Urban Future Lab at New York University. They have two children, Hannah and Noah. Hannah is a sculptor in New York City who graduated from Cornell and the Staedelschule fine arts academy, having held a German Academic Exchange Service (DAAD) fellowship, in Frankfurt, Germany.

In April 2018, Levy announced that he had Amyotrophic lateral sclerosis in an Op-Ed arguing for educational reforms for college admissions, including the ending of legacy admissions and increased financial aid. He died at his Manhattan home on November 27, 2018.

== Bibliography ==
- Harold O. Levy. "We need poverty-based affirmative action at America's colleges," The Washington Post.
- Harold O. Levy. "Talented Low-Income Students Belong at Top Colleges. Why Aren't We Helping Them Get there?" Fox News Channel
- Harold O. Levy. "Education Officials Flunk Statistics 101," The Wall Street Journal.
- Harold O. Levy. "Why China and India Love U.S. Universities," Scientific American.
- Harold O. Levy. "Why Schools Make Bad Buying Decisions," Edsurge.
- Harold O. Levy. "Educated nation?," The Hechinger Report.
- Harold O. Levy. "Mayoral Control: No Going Back," New York Post.
- Harold O. Levy. "Five Ways to Fix America's Schools," The New York Times.
- Harold O. Levy. "The Great Truancy Cover-Up," The Yale Review.
- Harold O. Levy. "Charters & Accountability," New York Post.
- Harold O. Levy. "Mistaking Attendance," The New York Times.
- Harold O. Levy. "How Do You Spend $1.93 Billion," The New York Times.
- Harold O. Levy. "How to Fix Albany: An Independent Budget Office," The New York Times.
- Harold O. Levy. "What a Chancellor Needs Most," The New York Times.
- Harold O. Levy. "The Schools Need $7 Billion," The New York Times.
- Harold O. Levy. "Science Teaching vs. Aircraft Carriers," The Daily Beast.
- Harold O. Levy. "Report of the Commission on School Facilities and Maintenance Reform."
- Harold O. Levy. "The Commercialization of Higher Education: A for-Profit Perspective CHEA International Commission Meeting," Kaplan, Inc.
- Harold O. Levy. "Chancellor's Report on the Education of English Language Learners," New York City Board of Education.
