= Anna In-Between =

2009 novel by Elizabeth Nunez

- Anna In-Between book cover
- Author: Elizabeth Nunez
- Language: English
- Publisher: Akashic Books
- Publication date: 2009
- Publication place: United States
- Pages: 347
- ISBN: 978-1-936070-69-5

Anna In-Between is a 2009 English novel by Trinidadian American author Elizabeth Nunez. Anna, the lead character of the novel, finds herself in a situation where she is made to ponder on the differences between her native Caribbean, where her parents live, and her adopted lifestyle in Manhattan, and how race affects it. The novel was longlisted for the 2011 International Dublin Literary Award.

== Plot ==
Anna Sinclair is an established and in-demand book editor settled in Manhattan. On a vacation trip getting away from her work pressures, she visits her parents in her native Caribbean island. The Sinclairs are a well-known Black family in a White dominated island. On her visit, Anna finds out that her mother, Beatrice, is suffering with breast cancer and is at an advanced stage. She is appalled by the fact that her father, John, is aware of the illness but the couple have opted not to seek any serious medical help. Anna tries to persuade them to fly to the United States with her, where treatment would be made available including surgery to remove the large tumor. Beatrice is of the opinion that she would only get second grade service over there due to her color. Beatrice's opinion puts Anna in a dilemma and makes her think of the differences in the two worlds in which she and her parents live. She thinks of how race plays a vital role in their lives. Anna is happy to know that despite the grave situation, her parents stick together in thick and thin, whereas her own marriage has ended in divorce.

== Publication and development ==
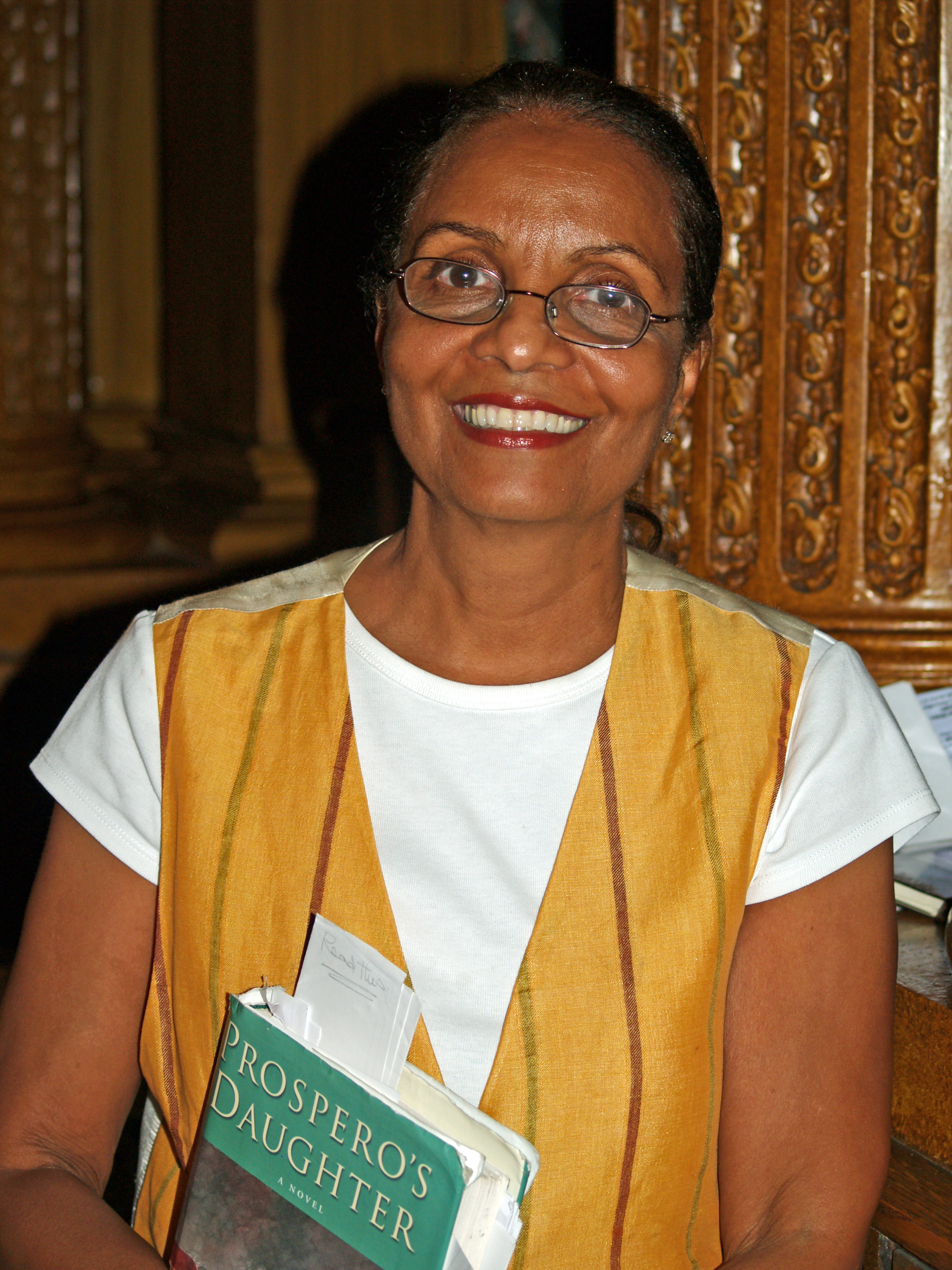
Nunez at the 2008 Brooklyn Book Festival

Anna In-Between was published in 2009 by Akashic Books. The 2003 novel The In-Between World of Vikram Lall by M. G. Vassanji and published by Doubleday Canada narrates a story of Vikram Lall in the colonial and post-colonial Kenya. Nunez, who grew up in Trinidad and later moved to the United States notes on how she relates with the story of Vikram Lall of being straddled in the two different worlds. When Nunez wrote her novel Anna In-Between and portrayed Anna, a character struggling in two identities, she said "[she] just stole Vassanji's line, 'in-between'". The novel was long-listed for the 2011 International Dublin Literary Award where Let the Great World Spin by Irish author Colum McCann eventually won. It was awarded at the 2010 PEN Oakland/Josephine Miles Literary Award for literary excellence.

== Reception and reviews ==
The novel received a starred review from Publishers Weekly and appreciated it for "[the] expressive prose and convincing characters that immediately hook the reader" and for handling family conflicts and immigration identity vividly. Author Ishmael Reed called it Nunez's best work and noted that "as long as she writes her magnificent books, characters like the Sinclairs, characters with depth and integrity, will not be hidden from us". Poet Lorna Goodison notes that the novel will "affect the way in which many readers now view the Caribbean". The World Affairs Journal's editor, Amy Finnerty, reviews the novel as "a psychologically and emotionally astute family portrait, with dark themes like racism, cancer and the bittersweet longing of the immigrant". Arlene M. Roberts of The Huffington Post notes that the novel "is a woman's journey through the maze of the publishing industry which can often be unwelcoming to different perspectives, an establishment where decision makers 'refuse to find themselves in black characters'."
