= National Black Writers Conference =

Afro American writer conference

The National Black Writers Conference (NBWC) is presented by the Center for Black Literature (CBL) at Medgar Evers College of The City University of New York. Founded by Dr. Brenda M. Greene, the Center for Black Literature was officially approved by the College Council of Medgar Evers College and by the board of trustees in October 2002. Its mission is to expand, broaden, and enrich the public's knowledge and aesthetic appreciation of literature produced by people of the African diaspora. It accomplishes its mission through a variety of programs and partnerships and by serving as a forum for the discussion, reading, research, study, and critical analysis of Black literature. It is the only center devoted to this mission in the country.

Founded at Medgar Evers College in 1986, the National Black Writers Conference is the vision of the late John Oliver Killens and is a major program of the Center for Black Literature. It has been held at Medgar Evers College since 1986. The first National Black Writers Conference was presented by the Humanities Division at Medgar Evers College. Maya Angelou delivered the keynote address. The event, a public gathering, has consistently attracted an array of renowned writers and scholars, including Amiri Baraka, Gwendolyn Brooks, Edwidge Danticat, Michael Eric Dyson, Charles Johnson, Paule Marshall, Haki Madhubuti, Walter Mosley, David Levering Lewis, Toni Morrison, Ishmael Reed, Sonia Sanchez, Tracy K. Smith, Quincy Troupe, Alice Walker, Derek Walcott, John Edgar Wideman, John A. Williams, and Colson Whitehead among others.

== History ==
The National Black Writers Conference (NBWC) convenes to provide emerging and established writers, literary scholars, critics, agents, publishers and booksellers, as well as educators, students, and the general public, with a forum for sharing the writing published by Black writers, discussing the trends and themes in black literature and identifying the major issues and challenges faced by Black writers and those in the business of reading, publishing, and selling black literature. The conversations and presentations of these writers, scholars and industry professionals are held through panel discussions, roundtable conversations, writing workshops, and literary readings.

John Oliver Killens, the Conference founder, was a writer-in-residence and professor at Medgar Evers College from 1981 to 1987. The first NBWC held at Medgar Evers College, a year before Killens's death on October 27, 1987, focused on the social responsibility of the Black writer. Each subsequent Conference has built on the theme of the previous one and has attracted a national and international audience. A four-day NBWC is held biennially and a NBWC Symposium, begun in 2009, is held biennially for one day.

Peter Lang published the proceedings of the 1996 Conference in 1998 in both hardcover and softcover, and the Center for Black Literature published the proceedings of the 2000 and 2003 Conferences. Third World Press published the proceedings of the Sixth National Black Writers Conference in 2008 and Morton Books Inc. published the proceedings of the Eighth National Black Writers Conference in 2010.

== NBWC – conferences and symposia ==
2022 —16th National Black Writers Conference: “The Beautiful Struggle: Black Writers Lighting the Way." Honorees were award-winning journalist and writer Herb Boyd, esteemed scholar Eddie S. Glaude Jr., 22nd Poet Laureate of the United States Tracy K. Smith, and award-winning novelist Jacqueline Woodson. The Center for Black Literature’s Lifetime Achievement Award Recipient was the legendary performer and literary activist Nana Camille Yarbrough.

2021 — National Black Writers Conference Biennial Symposium: "They Cried I Am: The Life and Work of Paule Marshall and John A. Williams, Unsung Black Literary Voices"

2020 — 15th National Black Writers Conference: "Activism, Identity, and Race: Playwrights and Screenwriters at the Crossroads." Honorees Carl Clay, Dominique Morisseau, Stanley Nelson, Voza Rivers, and Richard Wesley were recognized for their outstanding contributions and work in theater and film.

2019 — NBWC Symposium: "Playwrights and Screenwriters at the Crossroads: Tribute to Poet, Playwright, and Novelist Ntozake Shange"

2018 — 14th NBWC: "Gathering at the Waters: Healing, Legacy, and Activism in Black Literature"

The 14th NBWC, honored writers Steven Barnes, Kwame Dawes, Tananarive Due, David Levering Lewis, Eugene B. Redmond, Susan L. Taylor, and Colson Whitehead for the way in which their works explore and convey messages that heal and restore our individual selves and the collective community.

2017 — NBWC Symposium: "Our Miss Brooks: Tribute to Poet Laureate Gwendolyn Brooks"

2016 — 13th NBWC: "Writing Race, Embracing Difference"

Rita Dove, U.S. Poet Laureate from 1993 to 1995, served as Honorary Chair at the 13th NBWC. Authors Edwidge Danticat, Michael Eric Dyson, Charles Johnson, and Woodie King Jr. founder of the New Federal Theatre, were honored. A town hall forum with Dr. Haki R. Madhubuti and journalist Ashley Johnson and a conversation with Michael Eric Dyson and Khalil Gibran Muhammad were featured events during the Conference.

2015 — National Black Writers Conference Biennial Symposium: "Voices of Liberation and Resistance" and a Tribute to Danny Glover

2014 — 12th NBWC: "Reconstructing the Master Narrative"

Margaret Burroughs, Maryse Condé, Walter Mosley, Quincy Troupe, and Derek Walcott were honored during the Conference. Steve Cannon, Zakes Mda, Ishmael Reed, and Sonia Sanchez were among the participants in the Conference. Nobel Prize Laureate Derek Walcott was featured at the special literary event "The Search for Self in Caribbean Literature".

2013 — NBWC Symposium: "Celebrates the Life and Works of Writer, Filmmaker, and Social Activist Toni Cade Bambara"

2012 —11th NBWC: "The Impact of Migration, Popular Culture and the Natural Environment in the Literature of Black Writers"

Dr. Howard Dodson, former chief of the Schomburg Center for Research in Black Culture, and writers and poets Nikki Giovanni, Ishmael Reed, and Ngugi wa Thiong’o were celebrated at the Awards and Tribute program. Haki Madhubuti, Herb Boyd, Ron Daniels, and Michael Simanga engaged in a roundtable discussion and critical response to Manning Marable's Malcolm X: A Life of Reinvention.

2011 — NBWC Symposium: "Honoring the Work and Life of American Playwright August Wilson"

2010 —10th NBWC: "And Then We Heard the Thunder: Black Writers Reconstructing Memories and Lighting the Way"

Toni Morrison was the Honorary Chair of the 10th NBWC, which also celebrated the work and lives of poets and writers Amiri Baraka; Kamau Brathwaite; and Edison O. Jackson, former president of Medgar Evers College. The Center also launched the Killens Review of Arts & Letters, a biannual literary journal, at the Conference.

2009 — NBWC Symposium – Honoring the Work and Life of Speculative Fiction Writer Octavia E. Butler

2008 — 9th NBWC: "Black Writers: Reading and Writing to Transform Their Lives and the World"

The 9th NBWC was dedicated to the Centennial of Richard Wright. Activist and writer Susan Taylor served as Honorary Chair for the Conference. Activist-scholar, author Randall Robinson, poet Sonia Sanchez, public intellectual Cornel West, and publishers Cheryl Hudson and Wade Hudson were honorees.

2006 — 8th NBWC: "Expanding Conversations on Race, Identity, History and Genre"

Dr. Myrlie Evers-Williams was the Honorary Chair of the 8th NBWC, which was dedicated to the memories of speculative fiction writer Octavia E. Butler and playwright August Wilson. Conference honorees were Samuel Delany, Marita Golden, Haki Madhubuti, and Walter Mosley. Participating authors included Walter Dean Myers, Elizabeth Nunez, Willie Perdomo, Ishmael Reed, Quincy Troupe, and Tananarive Due among others.

2004 — 7th NBWC: "A Tribute to Activist and Writer John Oliver Killens"

Gil Noble, host of the award-winning television show Like It Is, delivered the keynote address for the Conference. Ossie Davis, Ruby Dee, Mos Def, Farai Chideya, Abiodun Oyewole, and John A. Williams were among the featured authors and panelists.

2003 — 6th NBWC: "Literature as Access: Connecting to Ourselves, Our Communities, Our Histories"

Poets Amiri Baraka, Linda Susan Jackson, Louis Reyes Rivera, and Tracy K. Smith were among the featured writers participating at the Conference.

2000 — 5th NBWC: "The Impact of Literature by Black Writers on Culture and Values in America"

1996 — 4th NBWC: "Black Literature in the '90s: A Renaissance to End All Renaissances"

1991 — 3rd NBWC: "New Directions for Black Literature in the 21st Century"

1988 — 2nd NBWC: "Images of Black Folk in Black American Literature and in the Literature of the Other Americas"

1986 — 1st National Black Writers Conference: "The Social Responsibility of the Black Writer"

== NBWC publications ==
- Greene, Brenda, and Fred Beauford, eds. Resistance and Transformation: Conversations with Black Writers. Irvington: Morton Books, 2010.
- Greene, Brenda, and Fred Beauford, eds. Meditations and Ascensions: Black Writers on Writing. Chicago: Third World Press, 2008.
- Greene, Brenda, N. Smith and T. Gordon, eds. And Then They Heard Our Thunder, Selected Proceedings from the Sixth National Black Writers Conference, New York: Center for Black Literature, Spring 2004.
- Greene, Brenda, N. Smith and T. Gordon, eds. And Then They Heard Our Thunder, Selected Proceedings from the Fifth Annual National Black Writers Conference, eds. Greene, Smith and Gordon. New York: Center for Black Literature, Spring 2003.
- Greene, Brenda and Elizabeth Nunez, eds. Defining Ourselves: Black Writers in the 90s. New York: Peter Lang, 1999.
