= No New Land =

1991 novel by M. G. Vassanji

- First edition cover
- Author: M. G. Vassanji
- Publisher: McClelland & Stewart
- Publication date: March 22, 1995
- ISBN: 0-771-08722-5

No New Land is a 1991 novel by Canadian author M. G. Vassanji. The action is largely set in Dar es Salaam and Toronto. The title is derived from Lawrence Durrell's novel The Alexandria Quartet, in which he translates Constantine P. Cavafy's "The City".
