= The Book of Secrets (novel) =

1994 novel by M. G. Vassanji

- First edition (McClelland & Stewart)
- Author: M. G. Vassanji
- Language: English
- Genre: Historical novel
- Published: 1994 (McClelland and Stewart)
- Publication place: Canada
- Media type: Print

The Book of Secrets is a novel by M. G. Vassanji, published in 1994.

It was the winner of the first Giller Prize for Canadian fiction. Vassanji also became the award's first-ever repeat winner in 2003 for his novel The In-Between World of Vikram Lall.

== Plot summary ==
In Dar es Salaam in the late 1980s, a retired school teacher named Pius Fernandes was given an English language diary by one of his former students Feroz, now a shopkeeper. The diary entries, written between 1910 and 1914, are an account written by Alfred Corbin, Assistant District Commissioner, a low ranking colonial official sent to the small town of Kikono. While there, Corbin becomes intrigued by a young woman named Mariamu whom he saves from an exorcism. Before she is married, Mariamu also briefly nurses Corbin when he is stricken with blackwater fever. After her marriage, Mariamu's husband, believing that Mariamu is not a virgin, accuses Corbin of sleeping with her.

The narrative then shifts to Mariamu's husband Pipa. Initially enraged at the thought that Mariamu was not a virgin when they married, he gradually grows to accept and love her. When their son Ali Akber Ali is born and has fair skin and grey eyes, their marriage becomes strained again. Meanwhile, World War I has reached the small town of Kikono and Pipa is enlisted as a messenger, first by Corbin on behalf of the English and later by the Germans. After being arrested by the English as a messenger for the Germans Pipa returns home only to find that Mariamu has been raped and murdered. After her death Pipa discovers that she had stolen Corbin's diary. Pipa believes that the diary holds the secret to Ali's paternity, but since he cannot speak English, and is illiterate, he is unable to read its secrets.

After a time, Pipa remarries a woman named Remti. As a consequence of this marriage his son is sent to live with his maternal grandparents in Moshi. While living with them he encounters Alfred Corbin and his wife Anne. After this encounter Corbin visits Khanoum, Ali's grandmother, and offers to pay for Ali's education. Khanoum refuses and contact between Corbin and Ali is dropped. Eventually, Khanoum falls into poverty and Ali goes to live with Pipa, Remti and their two daughters.

Living with Ali once more, Pipa begins to obsess over Mariamu. He builds a private shrine to her within his shop where he keeps Corbin's diary. Through his son, Pipa is eventually able to learn to spell and read the word Mariamu, and is able to read this word in Corbin's diary. Though he questions Mariamu's spirit about the true paternity of their son he is never able to obtain a direct answer.

The narrative shifts once more, to a young Pius Fernandes. Immigrating from India to Dar es Salaam in the early 1950s, Fernandes teaches at a boys' school. Eventually, he is forced to also teach at the inferior girls school where he becomes infatuated with a teenager named Rita. Ali, now a successful married man in his thirties, also falls in love with teenage Rita. He begins sending her notes and when she eventually responds he convinces her to run away with him to London. Ali eventually becomes successful in London and briefly encounters Corbin. However, letters left to Fernandes by a colleague and friend who corresponded with Corbin's wife, reveal that Corbin and Ali met several times though whether Ali's paternity was revealed is remained hidden.

In the present, Rita, now divorced from Ali, returns to Dar to reclaim the diary on behalf of her former husband. Fernandes willingly relinquishes both the diary and his research notes to Rita.
