= Patricia Ramsey =

American biologist and college administrator

6th President of Medger Evers College
- Incumbent
- Assumed office May 1, 2021
- Preceded by: Rudy Crew

Personal details
- Education: Norfolk State University (BS); Howard University (MS); Harvard University (MA); Georgetown University (PhD)

Patricia A. Pierce Ramsey is an American biologist and academic administrator serving as the sixth president of Medgar Evers College since 2021.

== Life ==
Ramsey earned a B.S. in biology education from Norfolk State University. She completed a M.S. in botany from Howard University and a M.A. at Harvard University. Ramsey received a Ph.D. in biology from Georgetown University.

Ramsey worked at Bowie State University for twelve years where she served a number of different roles including a professor of natural sciences, department chair, provost and vice president for academic affairs in 2004, and interim president in 2006. She was the vice president for academic affairs at Shaw University and the deputy fundraising officer at Norfolk State University. On July 1, 2016, Ramsey became the provost and vice president for academic affairs at Lincoln University. In 2021, Ramsey was a senior executive fellow of the Thurgood Marshall College Fund. In 2021, she became the sixth president of Medgar Evers College. She is the first woman to serve in the role.
