= Brenda M. Greene =

American scholar, author, literary activist (born 1950)

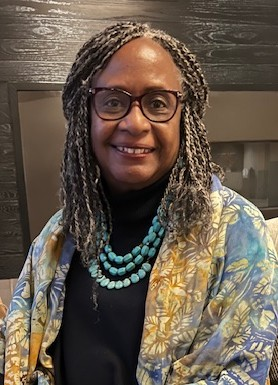
- Born: October 29, 1950 (age 75); Fort Monmouth, New Jersey, U.S.
- Education: New York University (BS, PhD); Hunter College (MS)
- Occupations: Scholar, educational leader, author, literary activist, and radio host
- Title: Founder and Executive Director of the Center for Black Literature
- Awards: Lynnette Velasco Community Impact Award (2015) Percy E. Sutton SEEK Women’s Empowerment Award (2016)

Brenda M. Greene (born October 29, 1950) is a professor, scholar, author, and literary activist. She is Professor Emerita and Founder and Executive Director Emerita of the Center for Black Literature at Medgar Evers College of the City University of New York. Greene has also served as the director of the National Black Writers Conference, and as chair of the English department at Medgar Evers College. Since 2004, she has served as a radio host of Writers on Writing on WNYE radio and connected listeners to some of today's most accomplished writers. She also hosts Writers on Writing on the YouTube podcast. Prior to her work in the academy, Greene worked as an educator in the New York City Public School system and with civic and political organizations. Greene is the former board chair of the Nkiru Center for Education and Culture, co-founded by hip hop musicians Yasiin Bey and Talib Kweli.

== Early life and education ==
Brenda M. Greene was born October 29, 1950, in Fort Monmouth, New Jersey. She attended public schools in Queens and Brooklyn and graduated from Erasmus Hall High School in Brooklyn, New York. She obtained a Bachelor of Sciencein English education at New York University, a Master of Arts at Hunter College of the City University of New York and a PhD in composition and rhetoric at New York University.

== Academic career ==
Greene was director of the Right to Read Program at Malcolm King College Harlem Extension before coming to Medgar Evers College in 1980. During her tenure at Medgar Evers, she has taught courses in composition, literature and African American literature, served on curriculum, program, assessment and accreditation committees, and held administrative positions within Medgar Evers College and within the City University of New York.

She has spent a lifetime working in and building cultural arts institutions that are dedicated to progressing Black life in Brooklyn and beyond. She has collaborated with Sonia Sanchez, Susan L. Taylor, Danny Glover, Michael Eric Dyson, Marita Golden, Edwidge Danticat, Khalil Gibran Muhammad, Tracy K. Smith, Colson Whitehead and elected officials in New York. She has had partnerships with institutions such as the Schomburg Center for Research in Black Culture, Bedford Stuyvesant Restoration Corporation, Amazon Literary Partnership, New-York Historical Society, African Voices, the Brooklyn Literary Council and the College of Education at Sacramento State.

As a professional in English studies, Greene has been a member of and in leadership positions at the National Council of Teachers of English (NCTE). She has led literary and writing seminars for the council and been a jurist for professional and literary organizations.

== Radio ==
Greene hosts a weekly radio program, Writers on Writing, which features writers from the African diaspora discussing their novels, poems, plays, nonfiction and their lives over the airwaves of WNYE, 91.5 FM.

== Writing ==
- The African Presence and Influence on the Cultures of the Americas. (2010)
- Resistance and Transformation: Conversations with Black Writers. (2010)
- Meditations and Ascensions: Black Writers on Writing. (2008).
- Defining Ourselves: Black Writers in the 90s. (1999).
- Rethinking American Literature. (1997).
- Shujaa, Kenya J.; Shujaa, Mwalimu J. (eds.). "National Black Writers Conference, Brenda M. Greene". The SAGE Encyclopedia of African Cultural Heritage in North America. doi:10.4135/9781483346373.n214.
- Dodson, Angela P. ed. (2024) “Saving Our Sons: Reflections on My Journey.” We Refuse to Be Silent: Women’s Voices on Justice for Black Men. pp. 235-244.
- Patrick O’Donnell, Stephen Burke, and Leslie Larkin. John Wiley and Sons, LtD, eds. (2022). “Marita Golden.” The Encyclopedia of Contemporary American Fiction 1980-2020.
- Banned Books and Critical Race Theory. (2023).
- Dr. Brenda M. Greene on Ntozake Shange. (2022).
- Louise Meriweather: A Life of Writing and Activism”, Konch Magazine, Winter 2019.
- Reflections on Nobel Laureate Derek Walcott,” Wadabagei: A Journal of the Caribbean and Its Global Diasporas. Vol. 18, No. 1 &2, Spring/Summer 2018.
- Haki Madhubuti, Michael Simanga, Sonia Sanchez and Woodie King, Jr. eds. “Reflections on Tales of the Out and the Gone: Short Stories by Amiri Baraka.” Brillant Flame: Amiri Baraka Poetry, Plays & Politics for the People. Third World Press, 2017, pp 105-109.

== Personal life ==
Greene is the mother of Talib Kweli Greene, a hip hop artist; and Jamal Greene, Dwight Professor of Law at Columbia Law School.

== Honors and awards ==
  - Vanguard Award, The Malcom X and Betty Shabazz Memorial and Educational Center, 2026
  - John Oliver Killens Literary Achievement Award, Harlem Writers Guild, October 2025.
  - Madam C J. Walker Award, Hurston Wright Foundation, October 2025.
  - American Book Award for Literary Criticism, October 2024.
  - National Association of University Women, Brooklyn Chapter, June 2024.
  - Mary Church Terrell Award, Visionary Honorary, June 2024
  - Lucille Rose NAACP Living Legend Award, Brooklyn Chapter of the NAACP, December 2022.
  - Zora Neale Hurston Literary Award, Brooklyn United Scholarship Association, October 2019
  - Lifetime Achievement Award, Brooklyn Oldtimers Foundation, December 2017
  - Medgar Evers College Percy E. Sutton SEEK Women's Empowerment Award, March 2016.
  - Medgar Evers College Community Council Educational Leadership Award, April 2015.
  - Lynnette Velasco Community Impact award from the Harlem Arts Festival, 2015.
  - Determined to Educate Leadership Award, 2014.
  - Educational Leadership Award, The Advent Heralds, November 9, 2014.
  - Harriet Jacobs Award for Excellence in Literature, Greater Queens LINKS-Arts Facet, 2013.
  - Arts and Culture Award, First Annual City College Celebration of Women in Arts and Culture, March 10, 2012.
  - Spirit of Africa Award for Achievements in the Creative Arts and in Connecting the World to the Works of Emerging and Established Writers of Color, 2010.
  - Inductee into the Gwendolyn Brooks Conference International Literary Hall of Fame for Writers of African Descent, April 2010.
  - Phenomenal Women in the Media Award, Von King Cultural Park, March 2010
  - Betty Smith Arts Award, Brooklyn Borough President's Office, March 2010.
  - National Conference of Artists Award for Excellence in the Promotion of Black Literature, 2009.
  - Educational Leadership Award, Brown Memorial Baptist Church, October 2007
  - Faculty Scholar Award, CUNY, 2007, 2008, 2009, 2010.Educational Leadership Award, Community Council of Medgar Evers College
