= John Louis Flateau =

American political scientist (1950–2023)

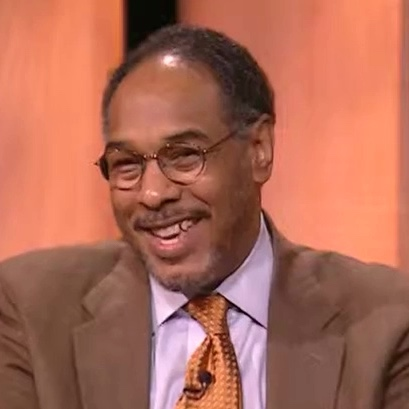
- Flateau on CUNY TV's The Urban Agenda, 2005
- Born: February 24, 1950; Brooklyn, New York, U.S.
- Died: December 30, 2023 (aged 73); Bedford–Stuyvesant, Brooklyn, New York, U.S.
- Education: New York University (BA); Baruch College (MPA); CUNY Graduate Center (MA, MPhil, PhD)
- Occupations: professor of political science; political strategist
- Years active: 1971–2023
- Employer: Medgar Evers College (1994–2023)
- Organizations: Vanguard Independent Democratic Association; New York State Independent Redistricting Commission; DuBois Bunche Center for Public Policy
- Known for: Flateau v. Anderson (1982); Chief of Staff to Mayor David Dinkins; Black political empowerment in Brooklyn
- Notable work: Black Brooklyn: The Politics of Ethnicity, Class and Gender (2016); The Prison Industrial Complex: Race, Crime & Justice in New York (1996)
- Political party: Democratic
- Movement: Civil rights movement, voting rights
- Spouse: Lorraine Witherspoon (m. 1978)
- Children: 2
- Parent(s): Sidney Flateau Sr. and Jeanne Hill Flateau

John Louis Flateau (February 24, 1950 – December 30, 2023) was an American political scientist, professor, civil rights advocate, and political strategist who advanced voting rights and Black political empowerment in New York. He served as the chief of staff to Mayor David Dinkins, New York City's first Black mayor, and was the lead plaintiff in the landmark federal redistricting case Flateau v. Anderson (1982), which established that states cannot delay redistricting beyond the first election cycle following a decennial census.

Flateau spent nearly three decades as a professor at Medgar Evers College, City University of New York (CUNY), where he chaired the Department of Public Administration and directed the DuBois Bunche Center for Public Policy. He also served as a Commissioner on the New York City Board of Elections representing Brooklyn as the Democratic commissioner, and as a member of the New York State Independent Redistricting Commission. His scholarship focused on urban politics, racial inequality, voting rights, criminal justice, and census demographics.

== Early life and education ==
Flateau was born on February 24, 1950, in Brooklyn, New York, the fourth of seven children of Sidney Flateau Sr. and Jeanne Hill Flateau. Flateau was raised in the Bedford-Stuyvesant neighborhood of Brooklyn, where he remained a lifelong resident.

Flateau attended St. Peter Claver Catholic School and Bishop Ford High School in Brooklyn before receiving a scholarship to New York University, where he earned a Bachelor of Arts degree in English Literature from Washington Square College. At NYU, he became active in the Black Allied Student Association.

He later earned a Master of Public Administration from Baruch College, a Master of Arts in Urban Policy, a Master of Philosophy in Political Science, and a Ph.D. in Political Science with a specialization in American Politics and Public Policy from the CUNY Graduate Center.

== Career ==
=== Early political organizing ===
In 1973, Flateau became a founding member of the Vanguard Independent Democratic Association (VIDA), a Black political club in Brooklyn, alongside his father Sidney Flateau Sr., sister Andrea, and Assemblyman Albert Vann. VIDA played a central role in electing Black candidates to public office and advancing voter education in central Brooklyn.

Flateau served as a legislative aide and chief of staff to Assemblyman Al Vann, and later as Executive Director of the New York State Black and Puerto Rican Legislative Caucus (later renamed the Black, Hispanic, and Asian Legislative Caucus) from 1975 to 1982.

=== Flateau v. Anderson (1982) ===
At age 31, Flateau became the lead plaintiff in Flateau v. Anderson, a federal lawsuit filed in the U.S. District Court for the Southern District of New York that challenged New York State's delay in redrawing legislative and congressional districts following the 1980 census. Flateau and co-plaintiffs Robert V. Connelly, Audrey Bynoe, and Angel A. Rodriguez, represented by attorney Paul Wooten, argued that this violated the "one person, one vote" principle established in Reynolds v. Sims (1964) and Article I, Section 2 of the U.S. Constitution. The case was part of a trio of federal lawsuits that led to the abolition of at-large City Council districts in New York City, the redrawing of state legislative lines, and the subjection of portions of the city's voting rules to federal oversight under the Voting Rights Act. The NAACP Legal Defense Fund filed an amicus brief in support of the plaintiffs. The court found gross malapportionment: 84.75% maximum deviation for Senate districts and 109% for Assembly districts. On April 2, 1982, a three-judge panel (Lawrence W. Pierce, Robert J. Ward, and Vincent L. Broderick) ruled for the plaintiffs, ordering redistricting for the 1982 elections.

The New York Court of Appeals cited the case in 2023 in Matter of Hoffmann v. New York State Independent Redistricting Commission, noting the pattern of redistricting litigation it established. Colleagues referred to Flateau as the "Map Man" for his redistricting expertise.

=== Local politics ===
Throughout his career, Flateau served as a campaign advisor and political strategist for numerous candidates at the local, state, and national levels. He worked on David Dinkins' successful 1989 mayoral campaign alongside political strategist Bill Lynch, which led to his appointment as Dinkins' chief of staff. He advised the campaigns of Governor Mario Cuomo, Jesse Jackson's presidential campaigns, Hillary Clinton, Barack Obama, Michael Dukakis, Hakeem Jeffries, Letitia James, and Yvette Clarke, among others. He served as Clarke's campaign manager in her successful 2016 congressional campaign.

Flateau held several positions in New York State government throughout his career. He served as Senior Vice President and Chief Diversity Officer for the New York State Empire State Development Corporation from 1983 to 1990, and later as Deputy Secretary for Intergovernmental Relations in the New York State Senate from 2009 to 2010. He also worked as a Principal Research Analyst for the New York State Commission on Health Education and Illness Prevention.

From 1990 to 1993, Flateau served as chief of staff and campaign coordinator for Mayor David N. Dinkins, the first Black mayor of New York City. His appointment as chief of staff was described as a historic first for the African American community in New York City government.

=== Academic career ===
Flateau joined the faculty of Medgar Evers College, CUNY, in 1994, where he remained until his death in 2023. He held multiple administrative and academic positions at the college, including tenured professor of Public Administration and Political Science, Chair of the Department of Public Administration, Dean of the School of Business, Dean of Institutional Advancement (Office of External Relations), and Director of the DuBois Bunche Center for Public Policy. He also directed the college's U.S. Census Information Center. Through the DuBois Bunche Center, Flateau led collaborative research on health equity and the social determinants of health in Brooklyn's Black communities. Beginning in 2017, he partnered with Maimonides Medical Center, MIT Co-Lab, and One Brooklyn Health Systems on research supporting Governor Andrew Cuomo's $1.4 billion "Vital Brooklyn" health and community development initiative, using a Participatory Action Research model to identify neighborhood-specific health challenges.

In May 2020, Flateau testified before a joint hearing of the New York State Assembly and Senate on "Solutions to the Disproportionate Impacts of COVID-19 on Minority Communities." He presented a 12-point policy agenda titled "In A Post-Pandemic World: Ending Black Inequality and Promoting Public Policy Equity," addressing digital education access, universal broadband, police reform, telemedicine, food security, affordable housing, and increased Black participation in the census and voting.

=== Census and redistricting work ===
Flateau dedicated much of his career to census advocacy and redistricting efforts. Flateau served as Chair of the U.S. Census Advisory Committee on Black Populations and Co-Chair of the NYC Black Advisory Committee for Census 2000.

From 2015 to at least 2018, Flateau served as a Commissioner on the New York City Board of Elections, representing Brooklyn as the Democratic commissioner. In this role, he was one of ten commissioners responsible for conducting fair elections across the five boroughs. The Board of Election's 2018 Annual Report noted his extensive background in redistricting, census work, and voting rights litigation, including his service as a former member of NYS Legislative Task Force on Demographic Research, which conducted congressional and state legislative redistricting and ended prison-based gerrymandering in New York.

He also served on the New York City Districting Commission (as commissioner in 2002–2003 and executive director in 2022–2023) and the New York State Independent Redistricting Commission, which was charged with redrawing all 26 congressional and 213 state legislative districts following the 2020 census. In 2020, New York State Senate Majority Leader Andrea Stewart-Cousins appointed Flateau to the state Independent Redistricting Commission, citing his extensive experience in census work and redistricting. He participated in a commission meeting on December 28, 2023, just two days before his death.

== Publications ==
Flateau's dissertation and his book Black Brooklyn provided an analysis of the political development of Black communities in Brooklyn, examining the interplay of ethnicity, socioeconomic class, and gender in shaping African American and Caribbean American political behavior.

Flateau authored several books and scholarly works on urban politics, racial inequality, and criminal justice:

- The Prison Industrial Complex: Race, Crime & Justice in New York (1996, Medgar Evers College Press)
- Young Lives, American Dreams: Caribbean American and African American Youth of Brooklyn
- Blackout? Media Ownership Concentration
- Black Brooklyn: The Politics of Ethnicity, Class and Gender (2016, AuthorHouse)

He also contributed a chapter to Racial Inequality in New York City Since 1965 (SUNY Press, 2019), edited by Benjamin P. Bowser and Chelli Devadutt.

== Personal life and death ==
Flateau met his wife, Lorraine Witherspoon, at a New York University undergraduate party in the early 1970s. They married in 1978 and raised their family in Bedford-Stuyvesant, where they had two sons. He was a lifelong member of the NAACP (Brooklyn Branch), a member of Community Board 3 in Brooklyn, and a trustee of the Bridge Street African Methodist Episcopal Church, where he was also a Senior Steward. He was a member of the African Atlantic Genealogical Society, Inc., along with his sisters, and actively researched his family history, tracing his ancestry to enslaved, free African, and multiracial ancestors dating to the 1700s.

Flateau died at his home in Bedford-Stuyvesant on December 30, 2023, at the age of 73. He was survived by his wife, two sons and their families, and four siblings: Anne, Alice, Adele, and Richard. At the time of his death, Flateau had three grandchildren. The New York State Senate passed a resolution honoring his contributions, and Senator Zellnor Myrie renamed an elections database bill in his honor.
