= The Assassin's Song =

2007 novel by M. G. Vassanji

- Author: M. G. Vassanji
- Language: English
- Genre: Literary fiction
- Publisher: Doubleday in Canada; Knopf in United States; Penguin in India
- Publication date: August 21, 2007
- Publication place: Canada
- Pages: 336 pp
- ISBN: 978-0-385-66351-9 (Doubleday); ISBN 978-1-4000-4217-3 (Knopf)
- OCLC: 122707173

The Assassin's Song is a novel by M. G. Vassanji, published in 2007 by Doubleday Canada. It is the story of a young Indian boy (Karsan Dargawalla) whose dream is to escape his family's religious legacy. He wants to be ordinary: to go to school, play cricket, talk to girls, and make his own choices. He tries to escape by traveling to the United States for college (at Harvard) and eventually settling in Canada (in B.C.). The novel also contains the in-depth narrative of his ancient forebear.

It was shortlisted for the Giller Prize, the Governor General's Award, and the Rogers Writers' Trust Fiction Prize.
