= William L. Pollard =

President of Medgar Evers College

William L. Pollard was the president of Medgar Evers College of The City University of New York from 2009 to 2013 and the former president of the University of the District of Columbia. As president of Medgar Evers College, he succeeded Dr. Edison O. Jackson (1989–2009), Dr. Leo A. Corbie (acting, 1987–1989), Dr. Jay Carrington Chunn, 2nd (1984–1987), Dr. Dennis Paul (Interim Administrator, 1982–1984), and Dr. Richard Trent (1970–1982).

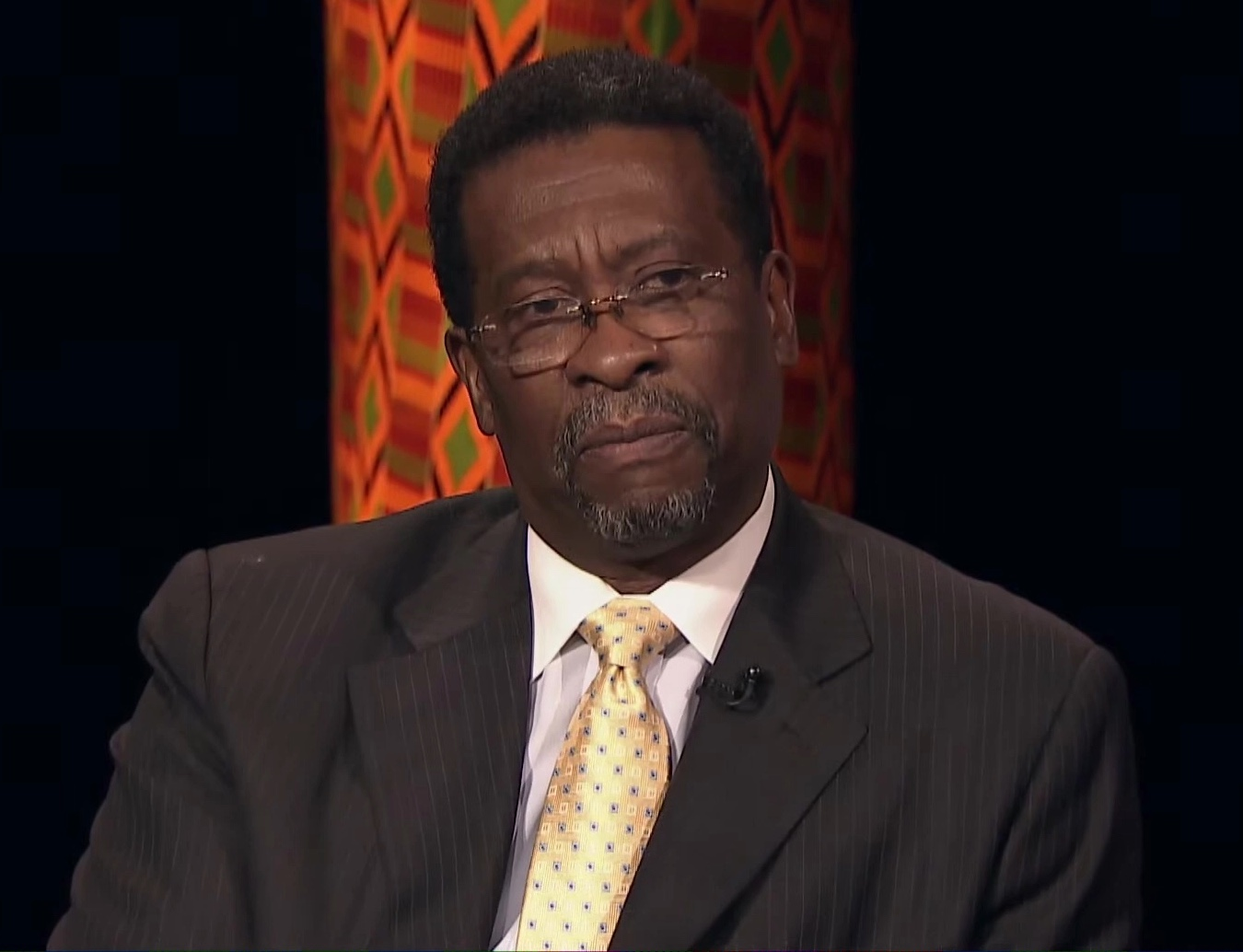
Pollard on CUNY TV's African American Legends, 2011

Pollard began his tenure at Syracuse University in 1989, serving as dean of the Syracuse University School of Social Work for ten years, where he led the school in its development of a student-centered program. Following this, he became the founding dean of the School of Human Services and Health Professions until he left for the University of the District of Columbia in 2002. Prior to this, he served as dean and founder of the Grambling State University School of Social Work from 1984 to 1989. In 1976, Pollard joined the University of Pittsburgh, where he was named the coordinator of the Community Organization Skills Set at the university. In 1972, Pollard was the Social Welfare department head at Livingstone College.

Pollard received his Ph.D. in policy and planning from the University of Chicago School of Social Administration in 1976, where the members of his dissertation committee included the late John Hope Franklin, the brilliant historian and educator who, in 1956, became the first African-American department chair at a major college when he was named chairman of Brooklyn College’s history department. Pollard earned his M.S.W. from the University of North Carolina School of Social Work, and a B.A. from Shaw University.
