= John Oliver Killens =

American novelist (1916–1987)

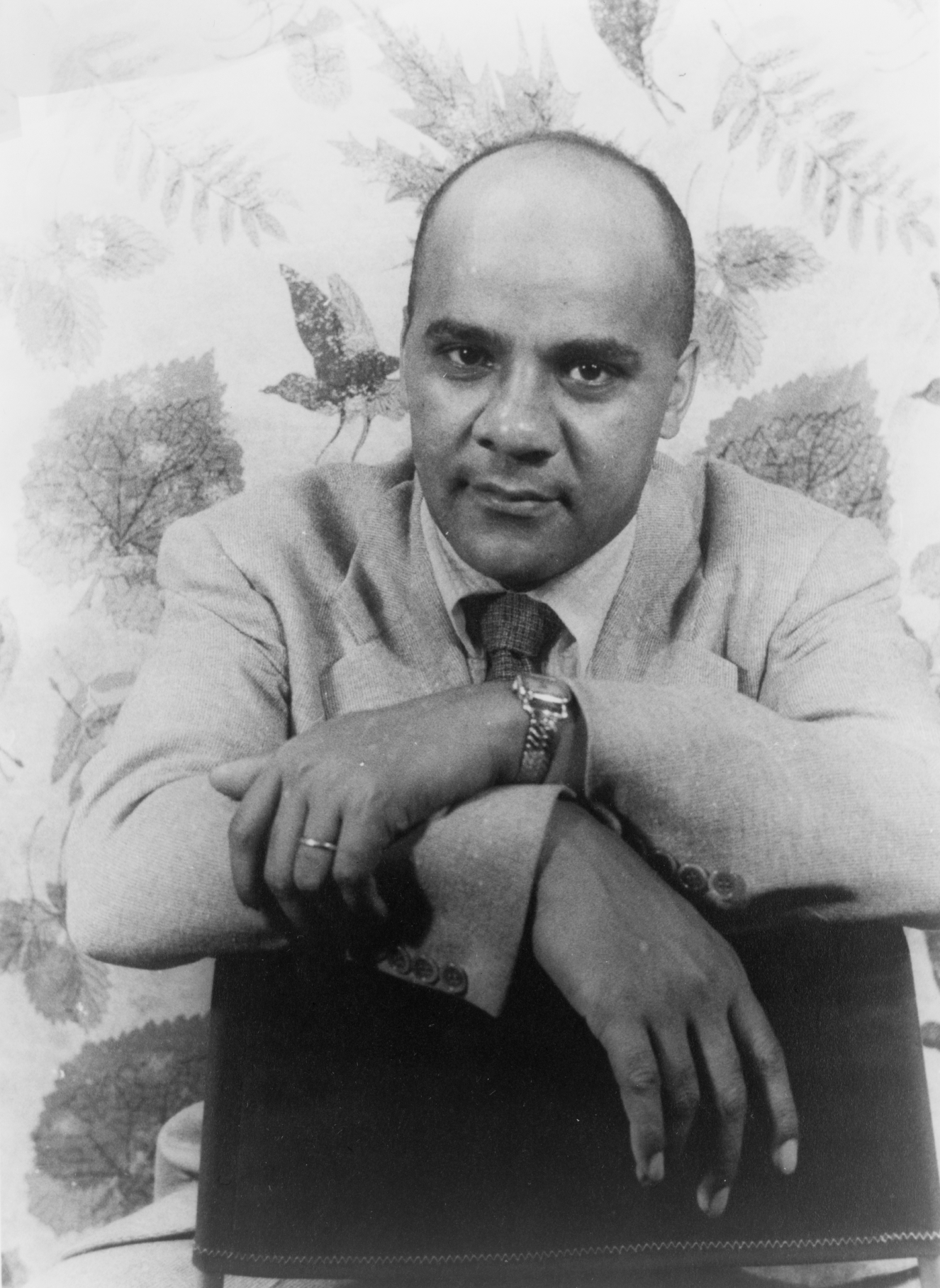
- Killens in 1954
- Born: January 14, 1916; Macon, Georgia, US
- Died: October 27, 1987 (aged 71); Brooklyn, New York, US
- Education: Edward Waters University; Morris Brown College; Howard University; Terrell Law School; Columbia University; New York University
- Occupations: Writer; an important figure in the Black Arts Movement; activist in the Civil Rights Movement; creator of the Black Writer’s Conference; university professor
- Spouse: Grace Ward Jones (m. 1943)
- Children: 2
- Writing career
- Language: English
- Genres: Novels, plays, screenplays, short stories, non-fiction
- Notable works: Youngblood; And Then We Heard the Thunder; The Cotillion; or, One Good Bull Is Half the Herd

John Oliver Killens (January 14, 1916 – October 27, 1987) was an American fiction writer from Georgia. His novels featured elements of African-American life. In his debut novel, Youngblood (1954), Killens coined the phrase "kicking ass and taking names". He also wrote plays, short stories and essays, and published articles in a range of outlets.

== Early life and education ==
Killens was born in Macon, Georgia, to Charles Myles Killens Sr. and Willie Lee Killens. His father encouraged him to read Langston Hughes' writings, and his mother, who was president of the Dunbar Literary Club, introduced him to poetry. Killens was an enthusiastic reader as a child and was inspired by writers such as Hughes and Richard Wright. His great-grandmother's tales of slavery were another important factor in learning traditional black mythology and folklore, which he later incorporated into his writings.

Killens graduated in 1933 from the Ballard Normal School in Macon, a private institution run by the American Missionary Association. It was then one of the few secondary schools for blacks in Georgia, which had a segregated system of public schools and historically underfunded those for black students.

Aspiring to become a lawyer, Killens attended several historically black colleges and universities between 1934 and 1936: Edward Waters College in Jacksonville, Florida; Morris Brown College in Atlanta, Georgia; Howard University in Washington, D.C.; and Robert H. Terrell Law School in Washington, D.C. He also studied creative writing at Columbia University in New York City.

Killens enlisted in the United States Army during World War II, serving as a member of the Pacific Amphibious Forces from 1942 to 1945. He spent more than two years in the South Pacific, and rose to the rank of master sergeant.

== Literary career ==
In 1948, Killens moved to New York City, where he worked to establish a literary career. He attended writing classes at Columbia University and at New York University. He was an active member of many organizations, serving as a union representative to a local chapter of the National Labor Relations Board (NLRB) and joining the Congress of Industrial Organizations (CIO). Around 1950, Killens co-founded with Rosa Guy and others a writers' group that became the Harlem Writers Guild (HWG).

His first novel, Youngblood (1954), dealing with a black Georgia family in the early 1900s, was read and developed at HWG meetings in members' homes. In his book, he first coined the expression "kicking ass and taking names".

Killens became friends with actor Harry Belafonte, who after establishing his production company HarBel wanted to adapt William P. McGivern's crime novel Odds Against Tomorrow as a film. Belafonte picked Abraham Polonsky as the screenwriter, but since Polonsky had been blacklisted by the House Un-American Activities Committee, Killens agreed to act as his front and was credited with the screenplay for the film. In 1996, the Writers Guild of America restored credit to Polonsky for the film under his own name.

Killens was a founding member of the Fair Play for Cuba Committee.

Killens's second novel, And Then We Heard the Thunder (1962), was about the treatment of the black soldiers in the military during World War II, when the armed forces were still segregated. Critic Noel Perrin ranked it as one of five major works of fiction of World War II. Killens's third novel, Sippi (1967), focused on the voting rights struggles of African Americans during the civil rights movement of the 1960s.

Slaves (1969), a historical novel by Killens, was developed from the screenplay for the film of the same name, intended to accompany its release.

In The Cotillion; or, One Good Bull Is Half the Herd (1971), Killens explored upper-class African-American society.

In addition to novels, Killens also wrote plays, screenplays, and many articles and short stories. He published these works in a range of media, including The Black Scholar, The New York Times, Ebony, Redbook, Negro Digest and Black World. According to Kira Alexander, "On June 7, 1964, Killens reached his largest audience when his essay 'Explanation of the "Black Psyche"' was published in the New York Times Sunday Magazine." He produced five further articles, which were published in his 1965 collection Black Man's Burden.

Killens taught creative-writing programs at Fisk University, Howard University, Columbia University, and Medgar Evers College. In 1986, he founded the National Black Writers Conference at Medgar Evers College. Named in the author's honor, The Killens Review of Arts & Letters is published twice a year by the center.

== Personal life ==
On June 19, 1943, Killens married Grace Ward Jones. They had two children together: a son, Jon Charles (born 1944), and a daughter, Barbara (born 1947).

In 1987, Killens died of cancer, aged 71, at the Metropolitan Jewish Geriatric Center in Brooklyn, New York. He was living in Crown Heights.

== Bibliography ==
=== Novels ===
- Youngblood (1954), novel
- And Then We Heard the Thunder (1962), novel
- Sippi (1967), novel
- Slaves (1969), novel
- The Cotillion; or, One Good Bull Is Half the Herd (1971), novel
- A Man Ain't Nothin' But a Man: The Adventures of John Henry (1975), novel
- The Great Black Russian: A Novel on the Life and Times of Alexander Pushkin (1989), novel
- The Minister Primarily (2021), posthumously published novel

=== Nonfiction ===
- Black Man's Burden (1965), essays
- Great Gittin' Up Morning: A Biography of Denmark Vesey (1972), biography

=== As editor ===
- Black Southern Voices: an anthology of fiction, poetry, drama, nonfiction, and critical essays (Meridian, 1992)
