= M. G. Vassanji =

Canadian author (born 1950)

M. G. Vassanji CM
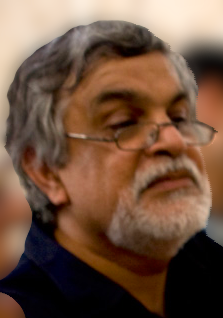
- Vassanji in 2009
- Born: Moyez G. Vassanji; 30 May 1950 (age 76); Nairobi, Kenya
- Education: Massachusetts Institute of Technology; University of Pennsylvania
- Occupations: Novelist and editor, academic
- Writing career
- Genres: Novels, short stories, memoir, and a biography

Moyez G. Vassanji CM (born 30 May 1950 in Kenya) is a Canadian novelist and editor, who writes under the name M. G. Vassanji. Vassanji's work has been translated into several languages. As of 2020, he has published nine novels, as well as two short-fiction collections and two nonfiction books. Vassanji's writings often focus on issues of colonial history, migration, diaspora, citizenship, gender and ethnicity.

== Early life and education ==
M. G. Vassanji was born in Kenya to Indian immigrants and raised in Tanganyika (now Tanzania). He attended the Massachusetts Institute of Technology and the University of Pennsylvania, where he specialised in nuclear physics, before moving to Canada as a postdoctoral fellow in 1978.

== Career ==
From 1980 to 1989 Vassanji was a research associate at the University of Toronto. During this period he developed an interest in medieval Indian literature and history, co-founded and edited a literary magazine (The Toronto South Asian Review, later renamed The Toronto Review of Contemporary Writing Abroad), and began writing fiction. Between 1989 and 2012, Vassanji published six novels, two collections of short stories, a memoir of his travels in India, and a biography of Mordecai Richler.

In 1989, after the publication of his first novel, The Gunny Sack, Vassanji was invited to spend a season at the International Writing Program of the University of Iowa. The Gunny Sack won a regional Commonwealth Writers Prize in 1990. He won the inaugural Giller Prize in 1994 for The Book of Secrets. That year, he also won the Harbourfront Festival Prize in recognition of his "achievement in and contribution to the world of letters," and was one of twelve Canadians chosen for Maclean's Magazine's Honour Roll. In 1996 he was a Fellow of the Indian Institute of Advanced Study in Shimla, India.

He again won the Giller Prize in 2003 for The In-Between World of Vikram Lall, the first writer to win this prize twice. In 2006, When She Was Queen was shortlisted for the City of Toronto Book Award. The Assassin's Song, released in 2007, was short-listed for the 2007 Giller Prize, the Rogers Prize, and the Governor General's Prize in Canada, as well as the Crossword Prize in India. In 2009 his travel memoir, A Place Within: Rediscovering India, won the Governor-General's Prize for nonfiction. He has also been awarded the Commonwealth Regional Prize (Africa).

His novel The Magic of Saida, set in Tanzania, was published in Canada in 2012, and in 2014 he published his memoirs, Home Was Kariakoo, based on his childhood and recent travels in East Africa. and in 2016 he published another novel, Nostalgia. In 2019, his ninth novel A Delhi Obsession was published.

He is a member of the Order of Canada. In 2013, he was awarded an honorary Doctor of Fine Arts from Carleton University. In 2016, he received the Canada Council Molson Prize for his career achievement.

== Themes ==
Vassanji's works have been reviewed by literary critics, such as in works edited by 2021 Nobel prize winner Abdulrazak Gurnah. Several themes emerge. Mainly, his characters are the Asians of East Africa (Kenya, Uganda, and Tanzania), whose historical record, as of that region as a whole, is sparse. In telling the story of his subjects, in his earlier novels he has used memory, written record, and folklore, in an intersection of oral and written histories. Thus in The Gunny Sack, his first novel, he starts with many memories, but his narrator has to delve into written history, primarily through colonial journals and travelogues, to complete and give shape to his created history. His third novel, The Book of Secrets starts with the journal of a colonial administrator at the border between German and British East Africa and brings to his creation memories and archival material. In The In-Between World of Vikram Lall, he looks at the condition and involvement of the Asians of Kenya during the Mau Mau rebellion of the 1950s. The past and unresolved issues cast strong shadows in his works. In his other works, for example No New Land, his characters have undergone a second migration, starting in the 1970s, to Europe, Canada, or the United States. Vassanji then examines how the lives of these characters are affected by their migrations. Though few of his African Asian characters ever return to India, the country's presence looms throughout his work. His 2007 novel The Assassin's Song, inspired by the devotional, mystical songs of his Khoja Ismaili community, which deeply influenced him in childhood, is set almost entirely in India, where it was received as an Indian novel and short-listed for the Crossword Prize. His second novel, No New Land, describes the travails of Asian immigrants arrived in Canada from Tanzania; as the title implies, there is no new land, the characters continue in their minds to lead the same lives. In the dystopic novel Nostalgia Vassanji tackles the topic of assimilation, in which characters can have their memories erased and replaced by new ones in order to be better integrated. But, the novel asks, is the process of erasure perfect?

Vassanji writes about the effects of history and the interaction between personal and public histories, including folk and colonial history. Vassanji's narratives follow the personal histories of his main characters; the historical perspective provided often leaves mysteries unsolved. The colonial history of Kenya and Tanzania serves as the backdrop for much of his work; in the Assassin's Song, however, he tackles Indian folk culture and myths.

== Bibliography ==
=== Novels ===
- The Gunny Sack (1989) ISBN 0-385-66065-0
- No New Land (1991) ISBN 0-7710-8722-5
- The Book of Secrets (1994) ISBN 0-312-15068-7
- Amriika (1999) ISBN 0-7710-8725-X
- The In-Between World of Vikram Lall (2003) ISBN 0-385-65991-1
- The Assassin's Song (2007) ISBN 0-385-66351-X
- The Magic of Saida (2012) ISBN 9780385667142
- Nostalgia (2016) ISBN 978-0385667166
- A Delhi Obsession (2019)
- Everything There Is (2024)

=== Short story collections ===
- Uhuru Street (1992) inspired by Naipaul's Miguel Street.
- When She Was Queen (2005)
- What You Are (2021)

=== Non-fiction collections ===
- A Place Within (2008)
- Extraordinary Canadians: Mordecai Richler (2008)
- And Home Was Kariakoo: A Memoir of East Africa (2014)

== Relevant Academic Literature ==
- Alexander, Vera. "The Relational Imaginary of MG Vassanji’s A Place Within." In Life Writing After Empire, pp. 69-84. Routledge, 2018.
- Binju, Gargi. "Writing Diasporic In-Betweenness: South Asians in Colonial and Postcolonial East Africa in the Novels of MG Vassanji 1." In Translation and Decolonisation, pp. 184-202. Routledge.
- Colt, Monica. "Identity Redefinition through the overcoming of the cultural boundaries in MG Vassanji’s the 'Magic of Saida'." The Independent Scholar 3, no. 3 (2017).
- Davis, Rocio G. "Negotiating Place: Identity and Community in MG Vassanji's "Uhuru Street"." ARIEL: A Review of International English Literature 30, no. 3 (1999).
- Desai, Gaurav. "“Ambiguity is the driving force or the nuclear reaction behind my creativity”: An E-conversation with MG Vassanji." Research in African literatures 42, no. 3 (2011): 187-197.
- Genetsch, Martin. Difference and Indentity in Contemporary Anglo-Canadian Fiction: MG Vassanji, Neil Bissoondath, Rohinton Mistry. Germany: Universität Trier, doctoral disseration in English, 2004.
- Makokha, J. K. S. "Afrasian Aesthetics in MG Vassanji’s The Magic of Saida: A Reflection." Matatu 52, no. 1 (2021): 176-187.
- Mohan, K. "Reverse immigration of cross cultured generation in the select novels of MG Vassanji." PhD diss., MADURAI KAMARAJ UNIVERSITY MADURAI, 2019.
- Ortega, Dolors. "INDIAN OCEAN NOMADIC DIASPORAS: Destabilizing Master Narratives of Belonging in MG Vassanji's Short Fiction." Kritika Kultura 41 (2023).
- Shirodkar, Preeti. "Spaces and Faces: Exploring Identity and Identification in MG Vassanji’s Writing." Matatu 52, no. 1 (2021): 160-175.
- Singh, Siddhartha. "Traveller’s Nostalgia to Rewrite History of the Lost Land: Reading MG Vassanji’s A Place Within: Rediscovering India." Dialogue: A Journal Devoted to Literary Appreciation 14, no. 01 (2018): 22-32.
