= Nightingale College =

Nursing college in Salt Lake City, Utah, US

- Motto: Better World through Better Humanity and Better Health
- Type: Private for-profit nursing school
- Established: 2010
- Chairperson: Mikhail Shneyder
- President: Jeffrey A. Olsen
- Provost: Diane Johnson
- Academic staff: 400+
- Students: 10,000+ (2026)
- Location: 95 S. State Street, Suite 400, Salt Lake City, Utah, United States; 40.7677°N 111.8878°W
- Website: nightingale.edu

Nightingale College is a private for-profit nursing school headquartered in Salt Lake City, Utah.

== History ==
Nightingale College, an accredited distance education institution of higher learning, offers several accredited nursing education programs throughout the country ranging from diploma to master's degree level credentials. Nightingale College was formed in 2010. In April 2011 the college began offering the Associate of Science in Nursing (ASN) Program, and received full accreditation status for the Bachelors of Science in Nursing in 2017. In the college's first ten years more than 1000 students graduated. In 2025, the college graduated 1,874 nurses, and in 2026, the college had over 10,000 students enrolled in LPN-to-ASN, PN, BSN, MSN FNP, and MSN PMHNP programs.

Prior to the Covid-19 pandemic in 2020, Nightingale's educational model was hub-based, partnering with care facilities using simulation labs and skills labs. During the pandemic, Nightingale converted students' skills progression to an online format, using 2-D simulations. By 2021, the first Meta headsets were piloted, and VR skills training was mandated for simulation activities in the following year. Nightingale determined that VR simulations didn't require additional training facilities or faculty, and eliminated geographic barriers.

Direct care hours are required by educational accreditors, however VR training is an acceptable form of clinical hours, and can be instrumental in broadening a student's clinical experiences.

In February 2026, Nightingale College hosted their first TEDx Nightingale College titled "Radical System Transformation." Fourteen speakers presented talks showcasing practical solutions to broadening nursing's impact, removing perceived systemic barriers, and improving organizational design.

== Accreditation ==
Nightingale College is institutionally accredited by NWCCU and programmatically accredited by CCNE, CNEA, and NLN CNEA.

== Awards ==
- The Princeton Review: 2026 Top Workplaces for Higher Education
- Nurse.com: 2026 Top Workplaces for Nursing Award
- Practical Nursing: 2026 Best LPN Programs in Utah
- NWCCU.org: The Beacon Award for Excellence in Student Achievement and Success 2024
- National Organization of State Offices of Rural Health (NOSORH) Collaboration Award
