= 2004 World Series =

100th edition of Major League Baseball's championship series

Team (Wins)	Managers	Season
Boston Red Sox (4)	Terry Francona	98–64 (.605), GB: 3
St. Louis Cardinals (0)	Tony La Russa	105–57 (.648), GA: 13
- Dates: October 23–27
- Venue(s): Fenway Park (Boston); Busch Stadium (II) (St. Louis)
- MVP: Manny Ramírez (Boston)
- Umpires: Ed Montague (crew chief), Dale Scott, Brian Gorman, Chuck Meriwether, Gerry Davis, Charlie Reliford
- Hall of Famers: Red Sox: Pedro Martínez; David Ortiz; Cardinals: Tony La Russa (manager); Scott Rolen; Larry Walker

Broadcast
- Television: Fox (United States); MLB International (International)
- TV announcers: Joe Buck and Tim McCarver (Fox); Dave O'Brien and Rick Sutcliffe (MLB)
- Radio: ESPN; WEEI (BOS); KMOX (STL)
- Radio announcers: Jon Miller and Joe Morgan (ESPN); Joe Castiglione and Jerry Trupiano (WEEI); Mike Shannon and Wayne Hagin (KMOX)
- ALCS: Boston Red Sox over New York Yankees (4–3)
- NLCS: St. Louis Cardinals over Houston Astros (4–3)

The 2004 World Series was the championship series of Major League Baseball's (MLB) 2004 season. The 100th edition of the World Series, it was a best-of-seven playoff between the American League (AL) champion Boston Red Sox and the National League (NL) champion St. Louis Cardinals. The series was played from October 23 to 27, 2004, at Fenway Park and Busch Stadium (II). The Red Sox swept the Cardinals in four games, earning their first title since 1918 and ending the Curse of the Bambino.

The Cardinals earned their berth into the playoffs by winning the NL Central division title, and had the best win–loss record in the NL. The Red Sox won the AL wild card to earn theirs. The Cardinals reached the World Series by defeating the Los Angeles Dodgers in the best-of-five NL Division Series and the Houston Astros in the best-of-seven NL Championship Series. The Red Sox defeated the Anaheim Angels in the AL Division Series. After trailing three games to none to the New York Yankees in the AL Championship Series, the Red Sox came back to win the series, advancing to their first World Series since 1986. The Cardinals made their first appearance in the World Series since 1987. With the New England Patriots winning Super Bowl XXXVIII, the World Series victory made Boston the first city to have Super Bowl and World Series championship teams in the same year (2004) since Pittsburgh in 1979. The Red Sox became the third straight wild card team to win the World Series; the Anaheim Angels won in 2002 and the Florida Marlins won in 2003.

The Red Sox had home-field advantage in the World Series by virtue of the AL winning the 2004 All-Star Game. In game one, Mark Bellhorn helped the Red Sox win with a go-ahead home run in the 8th, while starter Curt Schilling led the team to a game two victory by pitching six innings and allowing just one run. The Red Sox won the first two games despite committing four errors in each. The Red Sox won game three, aided by seven shutout innings by Pedro Martínez. A leadoff home run by Johnny Damon in the first inning gave the Sox a lead they never relinquished in game four for the Red Sox to secure the series. The Cardinals did not lead in any of the games in the series; the sixth and eighth innings of the first game was the only time that the two teams were tied. Manny Ramírez was named the series' Most Valuable Player.

The 2004 World Series was broadcast on Fox, and watched by an average of just under 25.5 million viewers. While not a particularly competitive series, the series is ranked as one of the most memorable World Series of all time, and one of the most iconic professional sports moments from the 2000s due to its historical significance for Boston. The Red Sox and Cardinals faced each other again in the 2013 World Series, which the Red Sox also won, this time 4 games to 2.

== Route to the series ==
This was the ninth meeting between teams from Boston and St. Louis for a major professional sports championship. This previously happened in two World Series (1946, 1967), four NBA Finals (1957, 1958, 1960, 1961), Super Bowl XXXVI two years prior, and the 1970 Stanley Cup Final. It was also the third World Series between the Red Sox and Cardinals. The previous two meetings in 1946 and 1967 were both won by the Cardinals in seven games.

=== Boston Red Sox ===
The Red Sox had lost in the previous season's ALCS against the New York Yankees. The loss was mainly blamed on the decision by then-manager Grady Little to keep starting pitcher Pedro Martínez in the game in the 8th inning of Game 7. The Yankees won the game and series after Aaron Boone hit a walk-off home run off Tim Wakefield. Little was fired two weeks later.

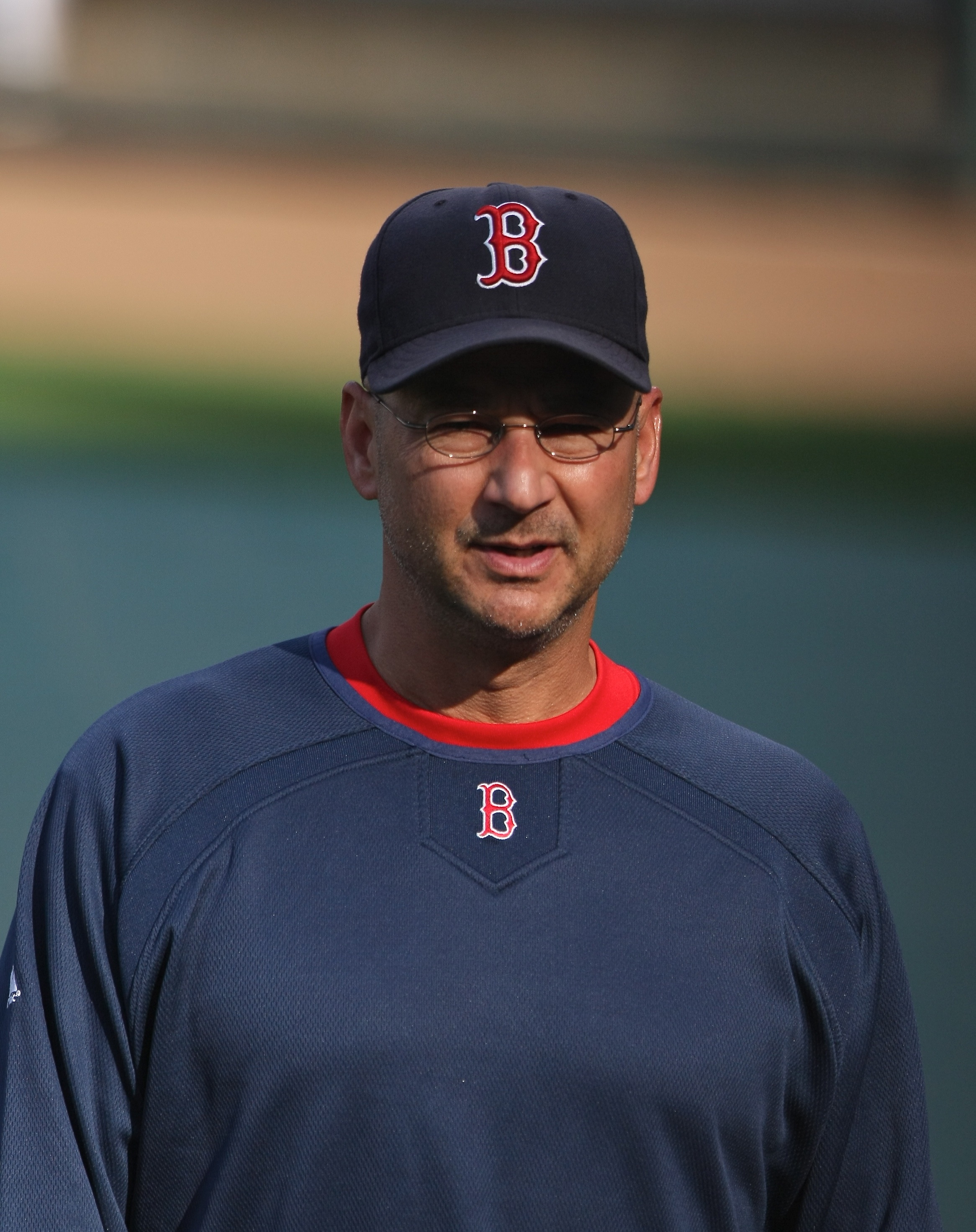
The Red Sox hired Terry Francona as their manager during the 2003–04 off-season.

During the off-season, the Red Sox hired Terry Francona as their new manager. They also signed Keith Foulke as their closer and traded for Curt Schilling as a starting pitcher. The Red Sox played two particularly notable games against the Yankees during the regular season. A game on July 1, in which they came back from a 3-run deficit to force extra innings, is best remembered for an incident in the 12th inning, when Yankees shortstop Derek Jeter made a catch on the run before hurling himself head-first into the stands. The Yankees won the game in the next inning to take an 8-game lead in the American League East. In the 3rd inning of a game on July 24, Red Sox pitcher Bronson Arroyo hit Yankees batter Alex Rodriguez with one of his pitches. As Rodriguez walked towards first base, he began shouting profanities at Arroyo. Red Sox catcher Jason Varitek positioned himself between the two players. After a brief argument, Varitek pushed his glove into Rodriguez' face, causing a bench-clearing brawl. The Red Sox eventually won the game thanks to a home run by Bill Mueller in the 9th inning. On July 31, the Red Sox traded shortstop Nomar Garciaparra to the Chicago Cubs after he had spent eight years with the team. They acquired shortstop Orlando Cabrera and first baseman Doug Mientkiewicz in this trade. They won the wild card to earn a place in the post-season for the second year in a row.

In the divisional round of the playoffs, the Red Sox faced the second-seeded Anaheim Angels in a best-of-five series. They won Game 1 largely thanks to a 7-run 4th inning, and went on to sweep the series. In the 7th inning of Game 3, with the Red Sox leading by 4, Vladimir Guerrero tied the game for the Angels with a grand slam. However, David Ortiz won the series with a game-winning home run in the 10th. In the American League Championship Series, the Red Sox lost the first three games against the top-seeded New York Yankees, including a 19–8 drubbing in Game 3, and were trailing 4–3 in Game 4 when they began the 9th inning. Kevin Millar was walked by Yankees closer Mariano Rivera. Dave Roberts then came into the game to pinch run for Millar and stole second base. Mueller then singled to enable him to tie the game. Another game-winning home run by Ortiz won the game 6–4 for the Red Sox in the 12th inning. Ortiz' single in the 14th inning of Game 5 scored the winning run for the Red Sox, in what was, then, the longest post-season game in baseball history. Despite having a dislocated ankle tendon, Schilling started Game 6 for the Red Sox. He pitched for seven innings, and allowed just one run, during which time his sock became soaked in blood. In the eighth inning, Yankees third baseman Rodriguez slapped a ball out of pitcher Arroyo's hand, allowing the Yankees to score a run. However, after a discussion the umpires called Rodriguez out for interference and canceled the run. Fans then threw debris onto the field in protest and the game was stopped for ten minutes. The Red Sox won the game 4–2 and became the first baseball team to ever force a Game 7 after having been down 3 games to none. A 10–3 win in Game 7 brought the Red Sox to the World Series for the first time in 18 years.

=== St. Louis Cardinals ===
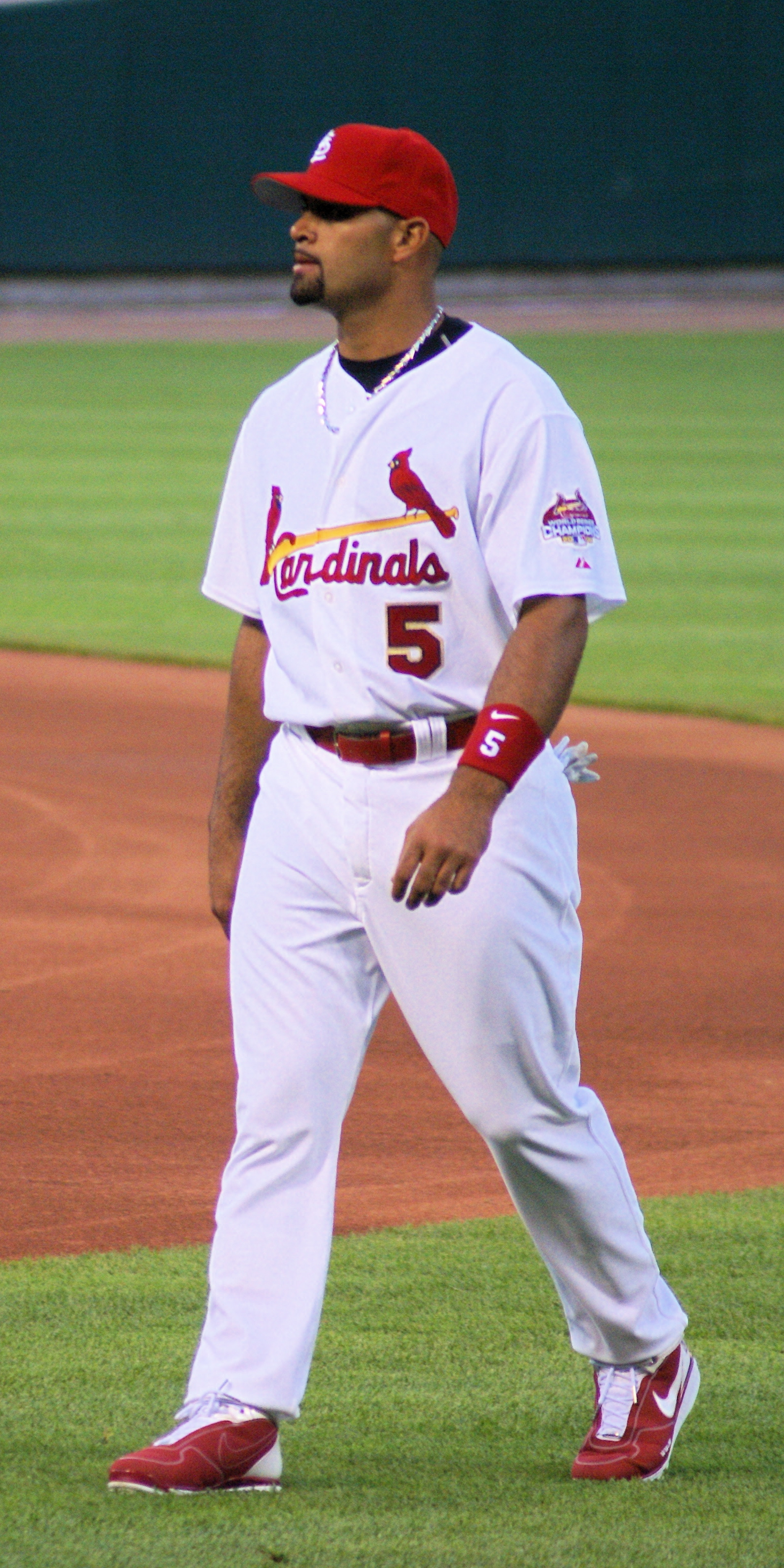
Albert Pujols, seen here in 2007, hit 46 home runs, then a career-high.

Having failed to make the playoffs the season before, and with their division rivals (the Chicago Cubs and Houston Astros) expected to be strong, the Cardinals were generally expected to finish 3rd in the National League Central. However, strong offensive seasons from Albert Pujols, Scott Rolen, and Jim Edmonds—during which they each hit more than 30 home runs and 100 runs batted in (RBI)—helped them to lead the league in runs scored. They also allowed the fewest runs of any team in the league. Four of their starters recorded at least 15 wins and closer Jason Isringhausen recorded a league-best 47 saves. They added outfielder Larry Walker in August and finished the regular season with the best win–loss record in the league at 105-57.

The top-seeded Cardinals faced the #3 seed Los Angeles Dodgers in the divisional round of the playoffs. Five home runs in Game 1 and no runs allowed by the bullpen in Game 2 helped the Cardinals to win the first two games. A complete game by Dodgers pitcher José Lima enabled the Dodgers to force a Game 4, during which a home run by Pujols won the series for the Cardinals. In the National League Championship Series, the Cardinals faced the #4 seed Houston Astros and won the first two games in St. Louis. However, the Astros tied the series in the next two games in Houston, before a combined one-hitter by Astros pitchers Brandon Backe and Brad Lidge gave them the series lead. An RBI single by Jeff Bagwell in the 9th inning of Game 6 tied the game and forced extra innings. In the 12th, Edmonds won the game for the Cardinals with a walk-off home run. Trailing in the sixth inning of Game 7, a game-tying RBI double by Albert Pujols followed by a Scott Rolen two-run home run and then an RBI single by Larry Walker in the 8th inning helped the Cardinals to a 5–2 win and their first World Series berth in 17 years.

By reaching the World Series with the Cardinals, Tony La Russa became the sixth manager to win pennants in both leagues. This was after La Russa had managed the Oakland Athletics to three straight pennants between 1988 and 1990 and winning the 1989 World Series. He would attempt to join Sparky Anderson as the only men to have managed teams to World Series championships in both leagues. He wore #10 in tribute to Anderson (who wore 10 while manager of the Cincinnati Reds) and to indicate he was trying to win the team's 10th championship.

== Series build-up ==
The coming series was heavily discussed and analyzed by the American media. The Star-News of Wilmington, North Carolina, compared the Red Sox and Cardinals position by position and concluded that the Cardinals were stronger in eight positions, the Red Sox in four and both teams even in one. They predicted that the Cardinals would win the series in seven games. Andrew Haskett of E-Sports.com praised the two teams' starting pitchers but also said that the Cardinals "took a serious blow" when Chris Carpenter was forced out of the series due to an injury to his arm. He noted the teams' power hitters, especially the Red Sox's David Ortiz and the Cardinals' Albert Pujols, Scott Rolen and Jim Edmonds. While he praised the Red Sox defense, he called the Cardinals "one of the best defensive teams to ever walk onto a baseball field". Ultimately he concluded that the series would be close and that the Red Sox would win it.

John Donovan of Sports Illustrated noted the team's expected ascent to the championship, writing that they were "not supposed to be here". He called the series a "blast from the past" because both teams were very old franchises and had twice previously met in the World Series. He wrote that the Red Sox had the edge in pitching and the Cardinals in defense and batting. He concluded that Schilling and Martinez would be the "key to [the] Series" and that the Red Sox would win in six games. Jim Molony of MLB.com, said he expected the series to play out differently from the last time the two teams met in the World Series in 1967 because both team offenses had been some of the best in the league during the season, while pitching had been very dominant in 1967.

Dan Shaughnessy of The Boston Globe said that "Bally's in Las Vegas set the Red Sox as 8–5 favorites to win the Series" and that there was "some sentiment in St. Louis that the NL champions have been disrespected". but also that Red Sox General Manager Theo Epstein "Did not want to dis[respect] the Cardinals". Shaughnessy also quoted Schilling as having said: "There's a lot of good players in that [visitors] clubhouse over there. This isn't the time for us to be thinking about history. If we get three wins and 26 outs into the fourth win, I'm pretty sure it will hit us." Before the series began, Shaughnessy wrote that although the Red Sox had beaten the Yankees, the series needed to be won, as it was the only way to end the Curse of the Bambino, which he had publicized based on the book of the same title in 1990, and demeaning chants of "1918!" would no longer echo at Yankee Stadium. During the series, he wrote that people in New England were thinking about loved ones who had spent their entire lives hoping that they would see their Red Sox win a World Series.

Both teams had lost in their previous World Series appearances in seven games. The Red Sox lost to the New York Mets in 1986, while the Cardinals lost in 1987 to the Minnesota Twins. The Cardinals and Red Sox had not won the World Series since 1982 and 1918 respectively. When the two teams had previously played each other in the 1946 and 1967 World Series, the Cardinals won both series in seven games. Having won the All-Star Game, the AL had been awarded home-field advantage, which meant the Red Sox had the advantage at Fenway Park in four of the seven games in the series.

== Summary ==
Boston won the series, 4–0.

Game	Date	Score	Location	Time	Attendance
1	October 23	St. Louis Cardinals – 9, Boston Red Sox – 11	Fenway Park	4:00	35,035
2	October 24	St. Louis Cardinals – 2, Boston Red Sox – 6	Fenway Park	3:20	35,001
3	October 26	Boston Red Sox – 4, St. Louis Cardinals – 1	Busch Stadium (II)	2:58	52,015
4	October 27	Boston Red Sox – 3, St. Louis Cardinals – 0	Busch Stadium (II)	3:14	52,037

== Matchups ==
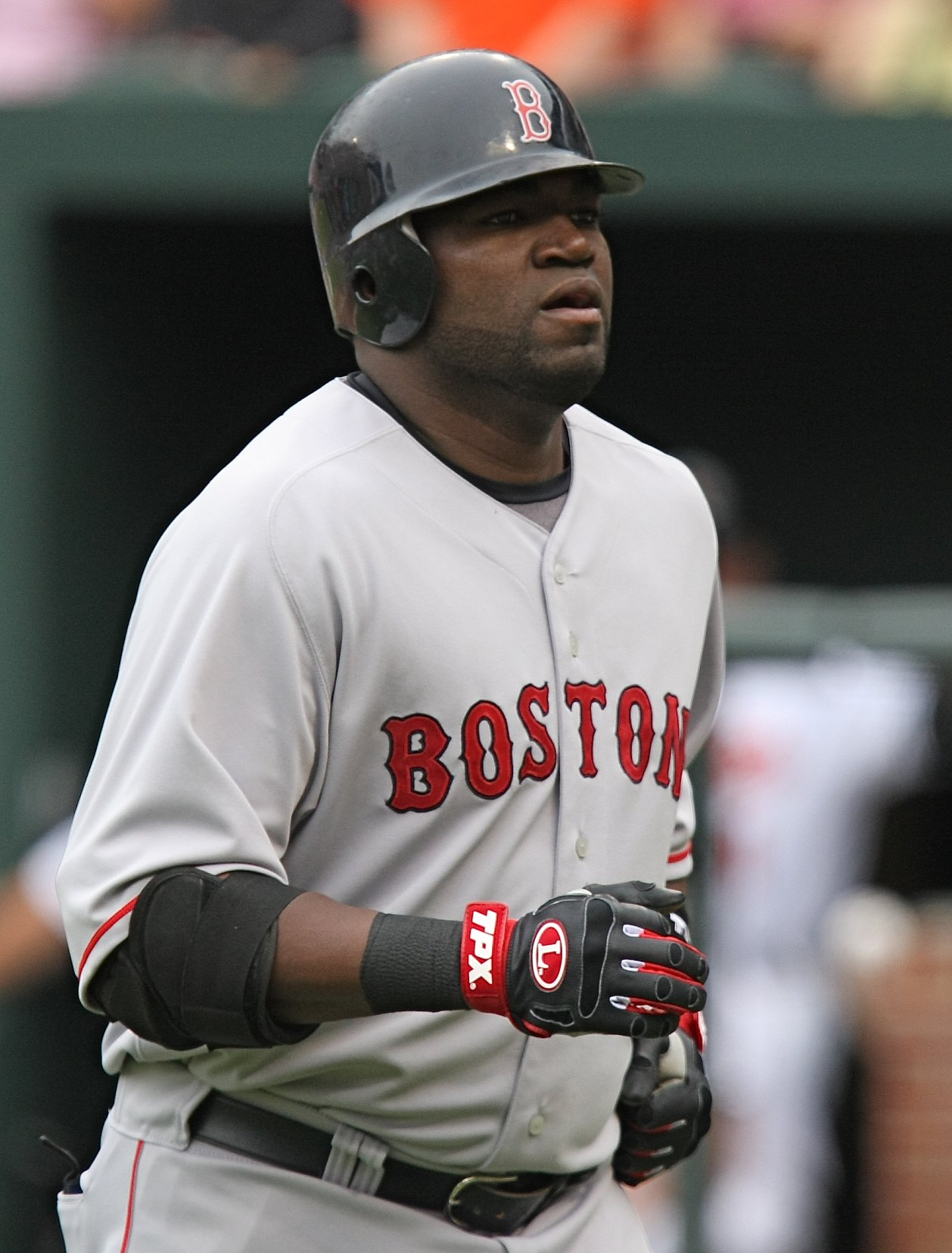
David Ortiz hit a three-run home run, his fifth of the postseason, for the Red Sox in Game 1.

=== Game 1 ===
October 23, 2004 8:05 pm (EDT) at Fenway Park in Boston, Massachusetts 49 °F (9 °C), Overcast
Team	1	2	3	4	5	6	7	8	9	R	H	E
St. Louis	0	1	1	3	0	2	0	2	0	9	11	1
Boston	4	0	3	0	0	0	2	2	X	11	13	4
WP: Keith Foulke (1–0) LP: Julián Tavárez (0–1); Home runs: STL: Larry Walker (1); BOS: David Ortiz (1), Mark Bellhorn (1); Attendance: 35,035; Boxscore

Local band Dropkick Murphys performed "Tessie", and a moment of silence was observed to remember local student Victoria Snelgrove, who had been accidentally killed by police two days earlier as Sox fans had celebrated winning the American League pennant. Steven Tyler, the lead singer of Aerosmith, another local band, performed "The Star-Spangled Banner" and Red Sox legend Carl Yastrzemski threw the ceremonial first pitch. Kelly Clarkson sang "God Bless America" during the seventh-inning stretch.

Down the right field line, into the corner it is fair! And a three-run home run, Ortiz has done it again!

— Joe Buck of Fox Sports, calling the fifth home run of the postseason by David Ortiz in Game 1.

Tim Wakefield made his first start of the 2004 postseason for the Red Sox, becoming the first knuckleball pitcher to make a World Series start since 1948, while Woody Williams, who had won his previous two starts in the post-season, was the Cardinals' starting pitcher. In the bottom of the first inning, Williams gave up a lead-off double to Johnny Damon, and then hit Orlando Cabrera in the shoulder with one of his pitches. After Manny Ramírez flied out, Ortiz hit a three-run home run in his first-ever World Series at bat. Kevin Millar then scored by virtue of a single by Bill Mueller to put the Red Sox up 4–0.

The Cardinals scored one run in the second on a sacrifice fly by Mike Matheny to score Jim Edmonds, then one in the third innings on a solo home run to right field by Walker. In the bottom of the third, the Red Sox scored three runs after seven consecutive batters reached base, giving them a five-run lead. Dan Haren came in from the Cardinals' bullpen to replace Williams during the inning.

In the top of the fourth inning, Bronson Arroyo was brought in to replace Wakefield after he had walked four batters. Those walks, combined with a throwing error by Millar and a passed ball by Doug Mirabelli, allowed the Cardinals to reduce the lead to two runs. In the sixth inning, So Taguchi reached first on an infield hit and was allowed to advance to second when Arroyo threw the ball into the stands. Doubles by Édgar Rentería and Walker tied the game at seven. In the bottom of the seventh inning, Ramírez singled with two men on base, and a poor throw by Edmonds allowed Mark Bellhorn to score. Ortiz then hit a line drive that appeared to skip off the lip of the infield and hit Cardinals' second baseman Tony Womack with "considerable force". Womack immediately grabbed his clavicle as a second Red Sox run scored. He was attended to once play had ended and replaced by Marlon Anderson. A precautionary X-ray revealed that there was no damage.

In the top of the eighth inning, with one out and two men on base, Red Sox closer Keith Foulke came in to pitch. Rentería singled towards Ramírez in left field, who unintentionally kicked the ball away, allowing Jason Marquis to score. Walker also hit the ball towards Ramírez in the next at bat. Ramírez slid in an attempt to try to catch the ball, but tripped and deflected the ball for his second error in two plays, and the fourth Red Sox error in the game. Roger Cedeño scored on the play to tie the game at nine. In the bottom of the eighth inning, however, Jason Varitek reached on an error, and Bellhorn then hit a home run off the right field foul pole, also known as Pesky's Pole, for his third home run in as many games to give the Red Sox a two-run lead. In the ninth inning, Foulke struck out Cedeño to win the game for the Red Sox 11–9.

With a total of 20 runs, it was the highest-scoring opening game of a World Series ever. With four RBI, Ortiz also tied a franchise record for RBI in a World Series game. Walker, making his World Series debut in Game 1, collected four hits in five at bats with a home run and two doubles. His four-hit outing tied a Cardinals World Series record, becoming the seventh overall and first to do so since Lou Brock in 1967, also against Boston.

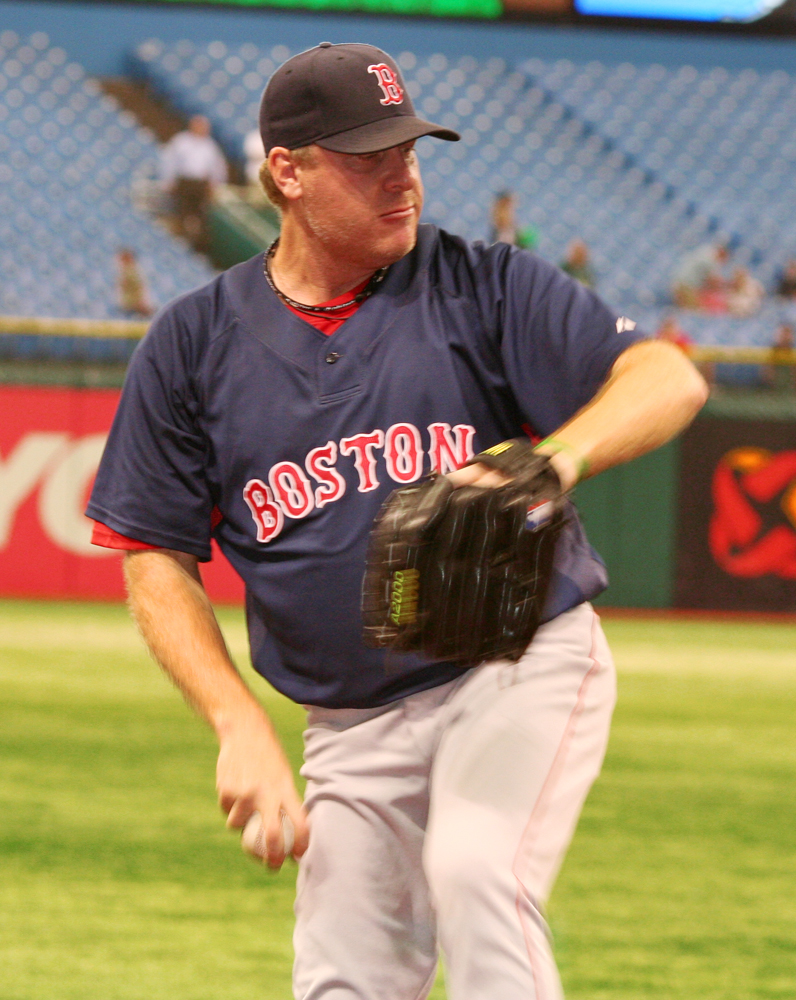
Curt Schilling pitched six innings of one-run ball and was credited with the win in Game 2.

=== Game 2 ===
October 24, 2004 8:10 pm (EDT) at Fenway Park in Boston, Massachusetts 48 °F (9 °C), Overcast
Team	1	2	3	4	5	6	7	8	9	R	H	E
St. Louis	0	0	0	1	0	0	0	1	0	2	5	0
Boston	2	0	0	2	0	2	0	0	X	6	8	4
WP: Curt Schilling (1–0) LP: Matt Morris (0–1); Attendance: 35,001; Boxscore

Boston native James Taylor performed "The Star-Spangled Banner" before Game 2 and singer Donna Summer, also a Boston native, performed "God Bless America" during the seventh-inning stretch. The ceremonial first pitch was thrown by the surviving three members of the famous Red Sox quartet that had faced the Cardinals in 1946: Bobby Doerr, Dom DiMaggio and Johnny Pesky (Ted Williams had died two years earlier).

Despite having a torn tendon in his right ankle, similar to Game 6 of the ALCS against the Yankees, Schilling started Game 2 for the Red Sox. Schilling had four stitches in the ankle the day before, causing him "considerable discomfort". He was not sure on the morning of Game 2 if he would be able to play, but after one of the stitches was removed, he was treated with antibiotics and was able to pitch. Morris started for the Cardinals on three days' rest (one day fewer than is orthodox rest for a starting pitcher).

In the first inning, Albert Pujols doubled with two out, and Scott Rolen hit a line drive towards Mueller, who caught it to end the inning. Morris walked Ramírez and Ortiz in the bottom of the inning. Varitek then tripled to center field to give the Red Sox a 2–0 lead.

In the fourth inning, Pujols doubled again and was able to score on an error by Mueller. The Red Sox also scored in the bottom of the inning when Bellhorn doubled to center with two runners on base, to give them a three-run lead. Cal Eldred came in to relieve Morris in the fifth inning, after he had walked the leadoff hitter, having already given up four runs in the previous four innings. Mueller committed his World Series record-tying third error of the game, in the sixth inning; however, the Cardinals failed to capitalize. In the bottom of the inning, Trot Nixon led off with a single to center, and two more singles by Johnny Damon and Orlando Cabrera enabled two more runs to score to make it 6–1.

After six innings of allowing no earned runs – which gave him a total of 13 innings against the Yankees and Cardinals with only one earned run allowed on a torn ankle tendon – Schilling made way for Alan Embree, who pitched a scoreless seventh. Mike Timlin replaced Embree in the eighth, in which a sacrifice fly by Scott Rolen reduced the Red Sox lead to four. Keith Foulke then came in to strike out Jim Edmonds to end the inning and also pitched the ninth to end the game. For the second game in a row, the Red Sox won despite committing four fielding errors.

With the win, Schilling became only the fifth pitcher to ever win a World Series game with a team from both leagues, having previously done it with National League teams, the Philadelphia Phillies in 1993, and the Arizona Diamondbacks in 2001. He later donated the bloody sock he wore during the game to the Baseball Hall of Fame museum. Much of the blame for the Cardinals' losses in the first two games was directed at the fact that Rolen, Edmonds and Reggie Sanders, three of the Cardinals' best batters, had combined for one hit in 22 at-bats.

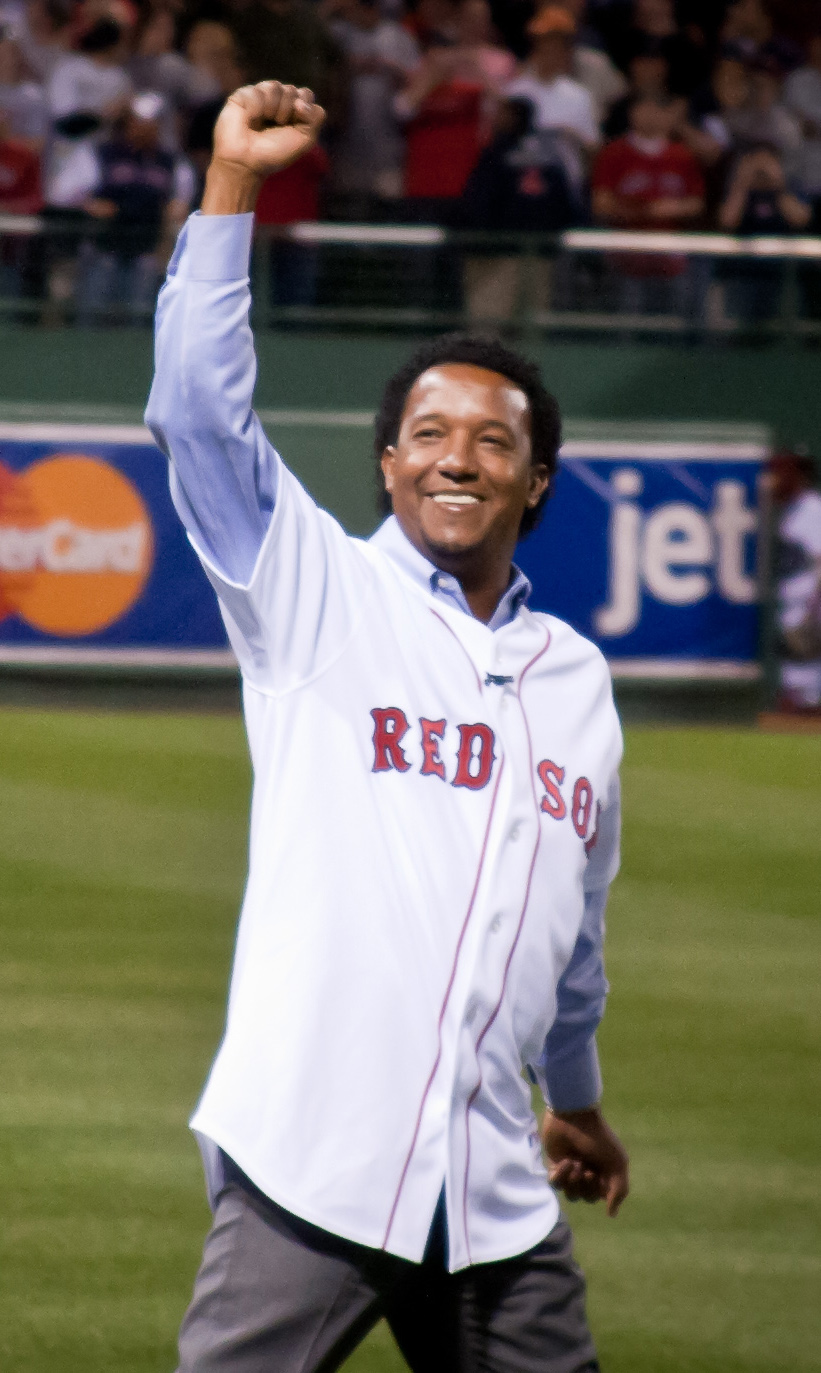
Pedro Martínez, in his first World Series start, pitched seven innings of scoreless ball and won Game 3 for the Red Sox.

=== Game 3 ===
October 26, 2004 7:30 pm (CDT) at Busch Memorial Stadium in St. Louis, Missouri 66 °F (19 °C), Overcast
Team	1	2	3	4	5	6	7	8	9	R	H	E
Boston	1	0	0	1	2	0	0	0	0	4	9	0
St. Louis	0	0	0	0	0	0	0	0	1	1	4	0
WP: Pedro Martínez (1–0) LP: Jeff Suppan (0–1); Home runs: BOS: Manny Ramírez (1); STL: Larry Walker (2); Attendance: 52,015; Boxscore

Seattle Mariners designated hitter Edgar Martínez was presented with the 2004 Roberto Clemente Award, having announced his retirement one month before. The ceremonial first pitch was thrown by arguably the Cardinals' best-ever position player, Stan Musial, and caught by arguably their best-ever pitcher, Bob Gibson. "The Star-Spangled Banner" and "God Bless America" were sung by country music singer Martina McBride and singer–songwriter Amy Grant respectively. During the game, a sign for the fast-food restaurant Taco Bell that measured 12 by 12 feet (3.7 m × 3.7 m) and read "Free Taco Here", was hung approximately 420 feet (130 m) from home plate, over the left-center field bullpen. Taco Bell promised that, if the sign was hit by a home run ball, they would give a free "Crunchy Beef Taco" to everyone in the United States.

Once again, the Red Sox took the lead in the first inning when Ramírez hit a home run off former Red Sox pitcher Jeff Suppan. Pedro Martínez was the starting pitcher for the Red Sox, and in the bottom of the first inning, he allowed the Cardinals to load the bases with one out. Edmonds then hit a fly ball towards Ramírez in left field, who caught it on the run and threw to catcher Jason Varitek at home plate. Varitek tagged out Walker, who was attempting to score from third, ending the inning.

In the bottom of the third inning, the Cardinals had two runners on base with no one out. Walker hit a ground ball towards first base, and Cardinals third base coach José Oquendo signalled to Suppan on third to run to home plate. However, halfway towards home, Suppan "suddenly stopped". Édgar Rentería, who had been running from second base towards third, was forced to return to second when he saw Suppan had stopped. After stepping on first base, David Ortiz began moving toward Suppan, who had turned back toward third, Ortiz threw to third baseman Mueller, who tagged Suppan out. After the next batter, Albert Pujols, grounded to Mueller, the inning ended.

Trot Nixon extended the Red Sox lead to two in the top of the fourth, hitting a single to right field that scored Mueller, who had started the rally with a two-out double to left-center. Johnny Damon then led off the Red Sox's fifth inning with a double to right. Singles by Orlando Cabrera and Ramírez, to right and left respectively, scored Damon to make it 3–0. With two out, Mueller singled along the first base line, enabling Cabrera to score the Red Sox's fourth run. Suppan was replaced by Al Reyes, which meant none of the Cardinals three starting pitchers had finished five innings during the series.

Mike Timlin relieved Martinez in the bottom of the eighth inning. He finished with six strikeouts, three hits allowed and retired the last 14 batters he faced. The Cardinals avoided a shutout when Walker hit a home run to center field off Foulke in the ninth inning, but Foulke retired the other three batters he faced in the inning to secure the win for the Red Sox 4–1.

On the same day the Red Sox won Game 3, The Boston Globe's Dan Shaughnessy wrote that, as this win brought the Red Sox on the verge of winning a World Series, he wondered how many people in New England were thinking about loved ones who had spent their entire lives rooting for the Red Sox and hoping that one day, they would see the Red Sox win a World Series.

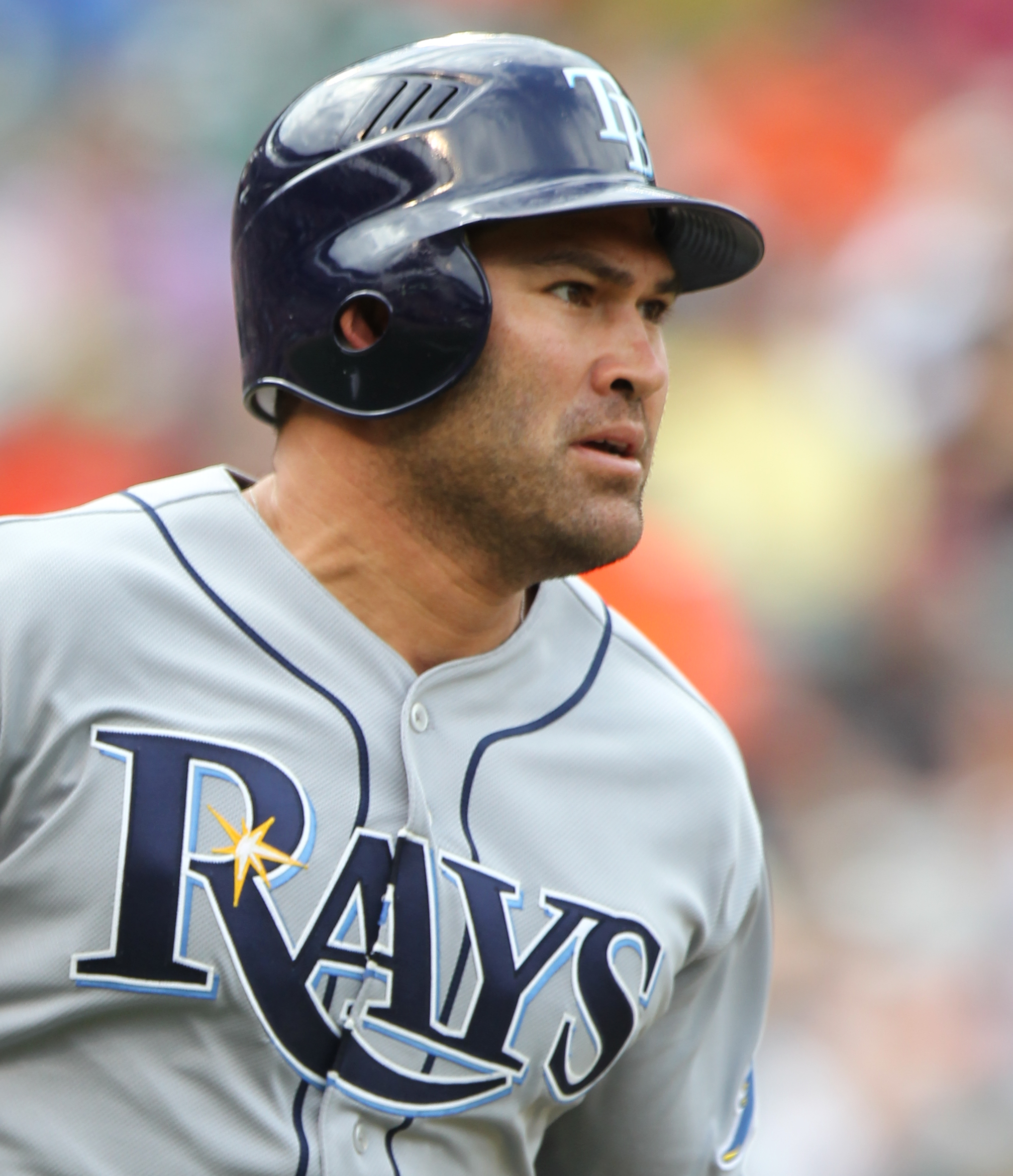
Johnny Damon hit the game and series-winning leadoff home run for the Red Sox in the first inning.

=== Game 4 ===
October 27, 2004 7:25 pm (CDT) at Busch Memorial Stadium in St. Louis, Missouri 61 °F (16 °C), Cloudy
Team	1	2	3	4	5	6	7	8	9	R	H	E
Boston	1	0	2	0	0	0	0	0	0	3	9	0
St. Louis	0	0	0	0	0	0	0	0	0	0	4	0
WP: Derek Lowe (1–0) LP: Jason Marquis (0–1) Sv: Keith Foulke (1); Home runs: BOS: Johnny Damon (1); STL: None; Attendance: 52,037; Boxscore

Country music singer Gretchen Wilson, a lifelong Cardinals fan, performed "The Star-Spangled Banner". Creed lead singer Scott Stapp sang "God Bless America" during the seventh-inning stretch. Barry Bonds and Manny Ramírez received the Hank Aaron Award for the National and American Leagues, respectively. Former Cardinals players Lou Brock and Red Schoendienst threw out ceremonial first pitches along with Rashima Manning, from the Herbert Hoover Boys & Girls Clubs of America. A lunar eclipse was visible during the game – the first lunar eclipse to take place during a World Series game. The game was also played on the 18th anniversary of Game 7 of the 1986 World Series, which the Red Sox had lost at Shea Stadium to the New York Mets, despite taking a 3–0 lead into the sixth inning.

Damon hit a home run to right field in the first at-bat of the game on a 2–1 count to give the Red Sox the lead in the first inning for the fourth straight game; it proved to be the game-winning run. Ramírez singled in the third inning to give him a hit in 17 consecutive postseason games. Doubles to right by David Ortiz and to center by Trot Nixon, who narrowly missed a grand slam after swinging on a 3–0 count, scored two more runs for the Red Sox to give them a three-run lead. Cardinals starter Jason Marquis went six innings and allowed just the three runs. Marquis was the only Cardinal pitcher who went past five innings, but would be saddled with the loss with no run support.

Back to Foulke, Red Sox fans have longed to hear it: The Boston Red Sox are World Champions!

— Joe Buck, calling the final play of Game 4.

Swing and a ground ball stabbed by Foulke! He has it, he underhands to first – and the Boston Red Sox are the World Champions! For the first time in 86 years, the Red Sox have won baseball's world championship! Can you believe it?

— Joe Castiglione calling the final play of Game 4 for WEEI in Boston.

In the top of the eighth, Mueller led off with a single to right and Nixon followed with his third double of the game. Jason Isringhausen came in to pitch for the Cardinals with the bases loaded and nobody out, and was able to finish the inning without allowing a run to score. Kevin Millar pinch hit for the Red Sox starting pitcher Derek Lowe during this inning. Lowe pitched seven scoreless innings, allowing just three hits, and was the second Boston starter in as many days to pitch seven scoreless innings. It was the third straight game in which the Red Sox starting pitcher had not allowed an earned run.

Red Sox closer Foulke came in to pitch the bottom of the ninth. Pujols led off the inning by hitting a single through Foulke's legs and into center field. After Foulke induced Rolen into a fly out and struck out Edmonds, Pujols took second base, but no stolen base due to fielder's indifference. Édgar Rentería then hit a ground ball that bounced back to Foulke on the mound. Foulke threw it underhand to Doug Mientkiewicz at first base to end the game, and the Red Sox drought.

The series win was the Red Sox's first title in 86 years. They were also the fourth team to win a World Series without trailing in any of the games in the series, and the seventh to win it having previously been three outs away from elimination. With the win, pitcher Lowe became the first pitcher to ever win three series-clinching games in a single postseason having also won Game 3 of the ALDS against the Angels and Game 7 of the ALCS against the Yankees. Although the series was won in St. Louis, 3,000 Red Sox fans were present at the game, and many stayed after the final out to celebrate with the team, including going on the field when the team came back out of their dugout with the World Series trophy. Ramírez, who was named the Most Valuable Player (MVP) of the series, said afterwards "I don't believe in curses, I believe you make your own destination. [sic]" Kevin Millar said that it was important to finish off the Cardinals in four and not let it go to a fifth game given the team's history.

The Cardinals offense struggled to find spark in the final three games. Pujols, Rolen, and Edmonds, the normally fearsome 3-4-5 hitters for the Cardinals, were six-for-45 with one RBI. The club batted .190 with a .562 OPS overall. Walker was one of very few exceptions, batting .357 with a 1.366 OPS. His two home runs accounted for the only two home runs hit by the entire Cardinals team. In the 2004 postseason, Walker scored 21 percent (14 of 68) of Cardinal runs.

== Composite line score ==
2004 World Series (4–0): Boston Red Sox (A.L.) beat St. Louis Cardinals (N.L.).

Team	1	2	3	4	5	6	7	8	9	R	H	E
Boston Red Sox	8	0	5	3	2	2	2	2	0	24	39	8
St. Louis Cardinals	0	1	1	4	0	2	0	3	1	12	24	1
Total attendance: 174,088 Average attendance: 43,522; Winning player's share: $223,619.79 Losing player's share: $163,378.53

== Series statistics ==
=== Boston Red Sox ===
==== Batting ====
Note: GP=Games played; AB=At bats; R=Runs; H=Hits; 2B=Doubles; 3B=Triples; HR=Home runs; RBI=Runs batted in; BB=Walks; AVG=Batting average; OBP=On base percentage; SLG=Slugging percentage

Player	GP	AB	R	H	2B	3B	HR	RBI	BB	AVG	OBP	SLG	Reference
Jason Varitek	4	13	2	2	0	1	0	2	1	.154	.267	.308	
Doug Mientkiewicz	4	1	0	0	0	0	0	0	0	.000	.000	.000	
Mark Bellhorn	4	10	3	3	1	0	1	4	5	.300	.563	.700	
Bill Mueller	4	14	3	6	2	0	0	2	4	.429	.556	.571	
Orlando Cabrera	4	17	3	4	1	0	0	3	3	.235	.381	.294	
Manny Ramirez	4	17	2	7	0	0	1	4	3	.412	.500	.588	
Johnny Damon	4	21	4	6	2	1	1	2	0	.286	.286	.619	
Trot Nixon	4	14	1	5	3	0	0	3	1	.357	.400	.571	
David Ortiz	4	13	3	4	1	0	1	4	4	.308	.471	.615	
Kevin Millar	4	8	2	1	1	0	0	0	2	.125	.364	.250	
Doug Mirabelli	1	3	1	1	0	0	0	0	0	.333	.333	.333	
Gabe Kapler	4	2	0	0	0	0	0	0	0	.000	.000	.000	
Pokey Reese	4	1	0	0	0	0	0	0	0	.000	.000	.000	
Derek Lowe	1	2	0	0	0	0	0	0	0	.000	.000	.000	
Pedro Martínez	1	2	0	0	0	0	0	0	1	.000	.333	.000	

==== Pitching ====
Note: G=Games Played; GS=Games Started; IP=Innings Pitched; H=Hits; BB=Walks; R=Runs; ER=Earned Runs; SO=Strikeouts; W=Wins; L=Losses; SV=Saves; ERA=Earned Run Average

Player	G	GS	IP	H	BB	R	ER	SO	W	L	SV	ERA	Reference
Derek Lowe	1	1	7	3	1	0	0	4	1	0	0	0.00	
Pedro Martínez	1	1	7	3	2	0	0	6	1	0	0	0.00	
Curt Schilling	1	1	6	4	1	1	0	4	1	0	0	0.00	
Keith Foulke	4	0	5	4	1	1	1	8	1	0	1	1.80	
Tim Wakefield	1	1	3 2/3	3	5	5	5	2	0	0	0	12.27	
Mike Timlin	3	0	3	2	1	2	2	0	0	0	0	6.00	
Bronson Arroyo	2	0	2 2/3	4	1	2	2	4	0	0	0	6.75	
Alan Embree	3	0	1 2/3	1	0	1	0	4	0	0	0	0.00	

==== Fielding ====
Note: G=Games Played; INN=Innings Played; PO=Putouts; A=Assists; ERR=Errors; DP=Double Plays; TP=Triple Plays; PB=Passed Balls; SB=Stolen Bases Allowed; CS=Caught Stealing; PKO=Pickoffs; AVG=Fielding Average

Player	G	INN	PO	A	ERR	DP	TP	PB	SB	CS	PKO	AVG	Reference
Bronson Arroyo	2	2 2/3	0	0	1	0	0	0	0	0	0	.000	
Alan Embree	3	1 2/3	0	0	0	0	0	0	1	0	0	─	
Keith Foulke	4	5	0	1	0	0	0	0	0	0	0	1.00	

=== St. Louis Cardinals ===
==== Batting ====
Note: GP=Games played; AB=At bats; R=Runs; H=Hits; 2B=Doubles; 3B=Triples; HR=Home runs; RBI=Runs batted in; BB=Walks; AVG=Batting average; OBP=On base percentage; SLG=Slugging percentage

Player	GP	AB	R	H	2B	3B	HR	RBI	BB	AVG	OBP	SLG	Reference
Mike Matheny	4	8	0	2	0	0	0	2	0	.250	.200	.250	
Albert Pujols	4	15	1	5	2	0	0	0	1	.333	.412	.467	
Tony Womack	4	11	1	2	0	0	0	0	1	.182	.250	.182	
Scott Rolen	4	15	0	0	0	0	0	1	1	.000	.059	.000	
Édgar Rentería	4	15	2	5	3	0	0	1	2	.333	.412	.533	
Reggie Sanders	4	9	1	0	0	0	0	0	4	.000	.308	.000	
Jim Edmonds	4	15	2	1	0	0	0	0	1	.067	.125	.067	
Larry Walker	4	14	2	5	2	0	2	3	2	.357	.438	.929	
Marlon Anderson	4	6	0	1	1	0	0	0	0	.167	.167	.333	
John Mabry	2	4	0	0	0	0	0	0	0	.000	.000	.000	
Roger Cedeno	3	4	1	1	0	0	0	0	0	.250	.250	.250	
So Taguchi	2	4	1	1	0	0	0	1	0	.000	.000	.000	
Yadier Molina	3	3	0	0	0	0	0	0	0	.000	.000	.000	
Héctor Luna	1	1	0	0	0	0	0	0	0	.000	.000	.000	
Jason Marquis	3	1	1	0	0	0	0	0	0	.000	.000	.000	
Jeff Suppan	1	1	0	1	0	0	0	0	0	1.000	1.000	1.000	

==== Pitching ====
Note: G=Games Played; GS=Games Started; IP=Innings Pitched; H=Hits; BB=Walks; R=Runs; ER=Earned Runs; SO=Strikeouts; W=Wins; L=Losses; SV=Saves; ERA=Earned Run Average

Player	G	GS	IP	H	BB	R	ER	SO	W	L	SV	ERA	Reference
Jason Marquis	2	1	7	6	7	3	3	4	0	1	0	3.86	
Jeff Suppan	1	1	4 2/3	8	1	4	4	4	0	1	0	7.71	
Dan Haren	2	0	4 2/3	4	3	0	0	2	0	0	0	0.00	
Matt Morris	1	1	4 1/3	4	4	4	4	3	0	1	0	8.31	
Ray King	3	0	2 2/3	1	1	0	0	1	0	0	0	0.00	
Woody Williams	1	1	2 1/3	8	3	7	7	1	0	0	0	27.00	
Jason Isringhausen	1	0	2	1	1	0	0	2	0	0	0	0.00	
Julián Távarez	2	0	2	1	0	2	1	1	0	1	0	4.50	
Cal Eldred	2	0	1 2/3	4	0	2	2	2	0	0	0	10.80	
Kiko Calero	2	0	1 1/3	2	4	2	2	0	0	0	0	13.50	
Al Reyes	2	0	1 1/3	0	0	0	0	0	0	0	0	0.00	

== Broadcasting ==
The series was telecast by Fox, with play-by-play announcer Joe Buck (who was the Cardinals' local television announcer during the regular season) and former Cardinals catcher Tim McCarver as the color analyst. Jeanne Zelasko covered the pre-game build up to all four games and the presentation of the World Series trophy.

An average of 23.1 million people watched Game 1. This was the highest television rating for the opening game of a World Series in five years and the highest average number of viewers since 1996. It was also the highest rated broadcast on any network in the past ten months. The ratings for the first two games were also the highest average since 1996, and the average for the first three games was the highest since 1999. Game 3 had the highest average number of viewers with 24.4 million, since 1996 when 28.7 million watched the Atlanta Braves and New York Yankees. It was also the Fox network's highest rating for a Game 3 of a World Series ever. Game 4 posted an 18.2 national rating giving the series an overall average of 15.8. This was the highest average in five years, and the average number of viewers of 25.4 million was the highest since 1995.

ESPN Radio also broadcast the series nationally, with Jon Miller on play-by-play and Joe Morgan as analyst. In terms of local radio, Joe Castiglione and Jerry Trupiano called the series for WEEI in Boston while Mike Shannon and Wayne Hagin announced for KMOX in St. Louis.

Game	Rating	Share	Audience (in millions)
1	13.7	25	23.17
2	15.9	24	25.46
3	15.7	24	24.42
4	18.2	28	28.84
Average	15.8	25.25	25.47

== Aftermath ==
With the win coming eight months after the New England Patriots victory in Super Bowl XXXVIII, the event made Boston the first city to have a Super Bowl and World Series winner in the same year since Pittsburgh in 1979. A number of players from both teams won awards for their performances during the season. Manny Ramírez won the Hank Aaron Award and, along with Albert Pujols, a Silver Slugger Award, while Gold Glove awards were won by Mike Matheny, Scott Rolen and Jim Edmonds. The American sports magazine Sports Illustrated honored the Red Sox with their Sportsman of the Year award a month later, making them the first professional team to ever win the award. For pitcher Curt Schilling, it was the second time he had won the award, having shared it with then-Arizona Diamondbacks teammate Randy Johnson in 2001.

This World Series win by the Red Sox continued a history of Boston teams beating St. Louis teams to win championships. Previously, in Super Bowl XXXVI, the New England Patriots had upset the St. Louis Rams' "Greatest Show on Turf" to win their first Super Bowl and herald a dynasty led by Tom Brady and Bill Belichick, the Boston Bruins had swept the St. Louis Blues in the 1970 Stanley Cup Finals (with Game 4 being remembered for Bobby Orr's Cup-winning overtime goal that sent him flying), and the Boston Celtics (as led by Bill Russell) met the St. Louis Hawks four times from 1957 to 1961 for the NBA championship and won three times, which included the first in a dynasty in 1957. With championship showdowns between teams from Boston and St. Louis seen in Major League Baseball, the NFL, NBA and NHL, it is the only showdown between teams from two specific locations, that has been seen in each of these four leagues. St. Louis would finally end Boston's dominance against them when the St. Louis Blues defeated the Boston Bruins in the 2019 Stanley Cup Finals.

Game 4 is the last World Series game to take place in what is known as a multi-purpose stadium, ending the cookie-cutter era of MLB stadiums from the 1960s-1970s.

=== Red Sox ===
The Red Sox's win in the World Series ended the "Curse of the Bambino", which supposedly had afflicted the team ever since the team sold Babe Ruth to the New York Yankees in 1919. Pitcher Derek Lowe and other players said that the team would no longer hear "1918!" at Yankee Stadium ever again. Kevin Millar said to all Red Sox fans: "We wanted to do it so bad for the city of Boston. To win a World Series with this on our chests, it hasn't been done since 1918. So rip up those '1918!' posters right now." Members of previous Red Sox teams who had fallen short immediately acclaimed the 2004 team, including Pesky – who had been the shortstop responsible for a fatal checking error that had allowed the Cardinals' Enos Slaughter to complete his "Mad Dash" to score the winning run in Game 7 at the old Sportsman's Park in 1946. Pesky watched the game from the visiting clubhouse and was immediately embraced by Millar, Wakefield, Schilling and others as a living representative of those previous teams as he joined the celebrations.

It also added to the recent success of Boston-area teams, following the Patriots wins in Super Bowls XXXVI and XXXVIII. With the Patriots having won Super Bowl XXXVIII the previous February, the Red Sox winning the World Series marked the first time since 1979 that the same city had a Super Bowl and World Series winner in the same year – the last city to accomplish the feat had been Pittsburgh, when the Steelers and Pirates had won Super Bowl XIII and the World Series respectively. The city gained seven championships in the next decade in the four major North American sports leagues (MLB, the NFL, the NBA and the NHL), including one in each league after the Patriots won two more Super Bowls, the Celtics won the 2008 NBA championship and the Bruins won the Stanley Cup in 2011. Following the Bruins winning the 2011 Stanley Cup Finals, Boston Globe columnist Dan Shaughnessy ranked all seven championships and chose the Red Sox' 2004 World Series win as the greatest Boston sports championship during the ten-year span.

Red Sox manager Terry Francona became the third manager in four years to win a World Series in his first year as manager, following Bob Brenly of the 2001 Arizona Diamondbacks and Jack McKeon of the 2003 Florida Marlins.

Massachusetts US Senator, Boston resident and future Secretary of State John Kerry, who had been named Democratic presidential nominee in Boston that summer, wore a Red Sox cap the day after the series ended. He also said that the Red Sox had "[come] back against all odds and showed America what heart is". His Republican opponent, incumbent President George W. Bush, made a phone call from the White House to congratulate the team's owner John W. Henry, president Larry Lucchino and manager Terry Francona. The team also visited Bush at the White House the following March, where he gave a speech honoring their presence, in which he asked "what took [them] so long?" A future Presidential candidate, Mitt Romney, at the time Massachusetts Governor, ceremonially helped remove the Reverse Curve road sign on Storrow Drive that had been famously spray-painted to read "Reverse the Curse" as a further marking of the end of the Curse.

The day after the Red Sox win, the Boston Globe more than doubled its daily press run, from 500,000 to 1.2 million copies, with the headline, "YES!!!" right across the front page.

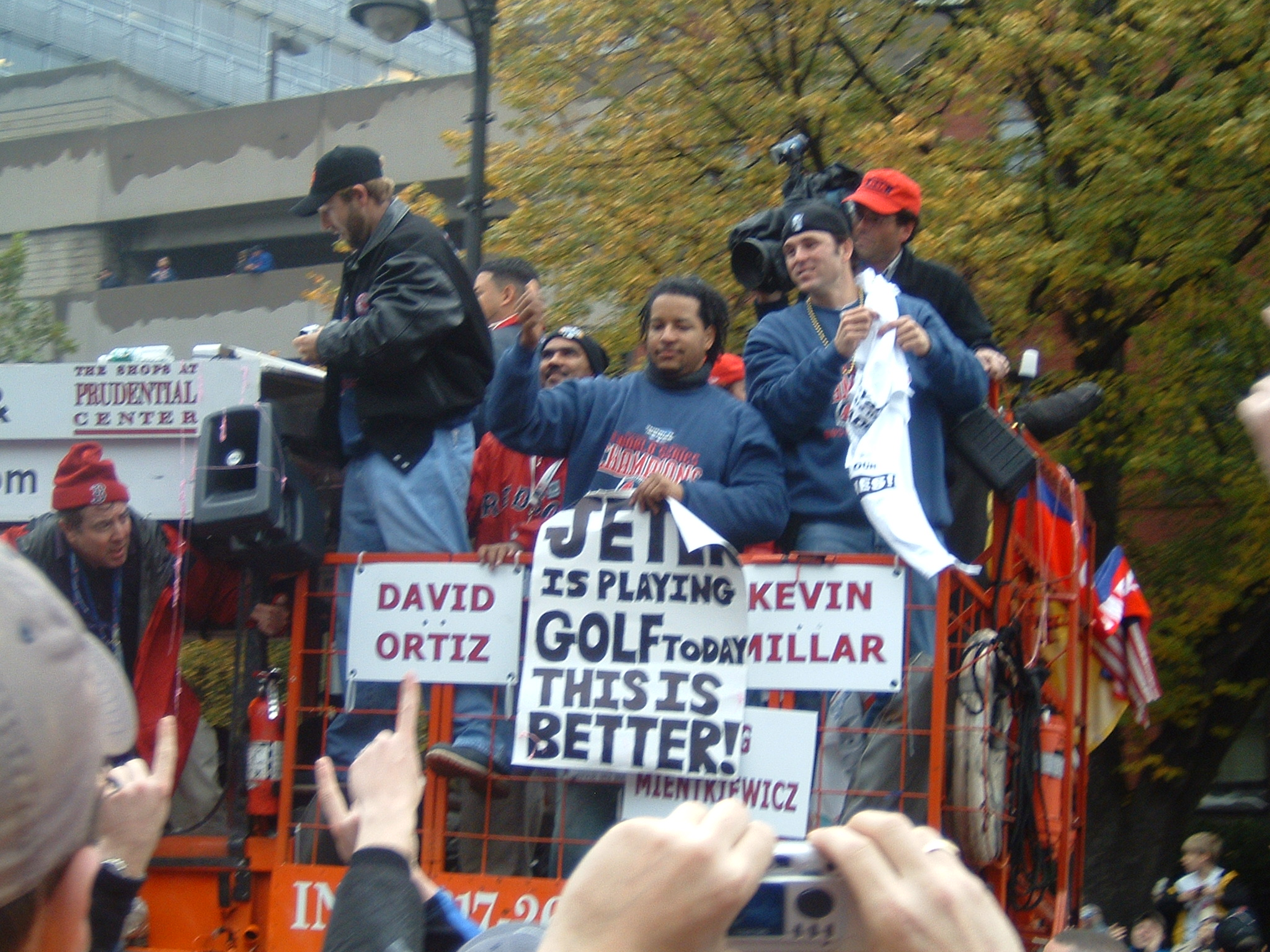
Ramírez at the victory parade, with a sign that one of the spectators handed him.

The Red Sox held their World Series victory parade on the following Saturday, October 30. The team was transported around on 17 duck boats equipped with loudspeakers so the players could talk to the spectators. Due to large interest in the parade, it was lengthened by officials the day before to include the Charles River, so that fans could watch from the Boston and Cambridge river banks. The parade did not however, include a staged rally. The parade began at 10 a.m. local time at Fenway Park, turned east onto Boylston Street, then west onto Tremont Street and Storrow Drive before entering the river. One of the lanes on Massachusetts Avenue had to be closed to accommodate members of the media filming the parade as it passed under the Harvard Bridge. Ramírez was handed a sign by one of the spectators part of the way through the parade, which read, "Jeter is playing golf today. This is better!" He held on to this sign for the rest of the parade, in a similar way to what Tug McGraw said after the Philadelphia Phillies won the 1980 World Series. Over three million people were estimated to have attended the parade, making it the largest gathering ever in the city of Boston.

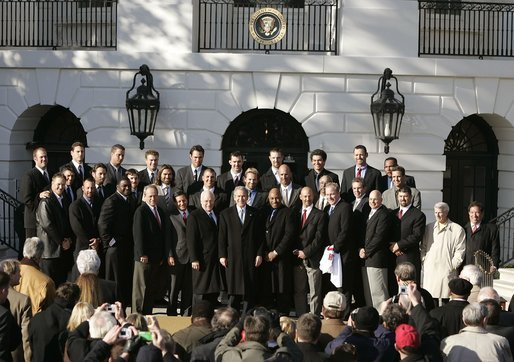
The Boston Red Sox were honored at the White House by President George W. Bush following their 2004 World Series victory.

The Red Sox were presented with their World Series rings on April 11, 2005, at a ceremony before the team's first home game of the 2005 season. Former Red Sox players Bobby Doerr, Dom DiMaggio, Johnny Pesky, and Carl Yastrzemski were all present, as were the Boston Symphony Orchestra and the Boston Pops Orchestra. During the ceremony, five red pennants were first unfurled at the top of the Green Monster, showing the years of each of the Red Sox' previous World Series wins. A much larger banner was unfurled that covered the entire wall and read "2004 World Series Champions". James Taylor, himself a Boston native and a Red Sox fan, performed "America the Beautiful", and 19 members of the United States Army and Marine Corps who had fought in the Iraq War walked onto the field. Moments of silence were held to honor the deaths of Pope John Paul II, who had died nine days earlier, and former Red Sox relief pitcher, Dick Radatz. The rings were handed out by the team's owner, John W. Henry. Former Red Sox players Lowe and Dave Roberts, who had joined the Los Angeles Dodgers and San Diego Padres respectively during the off-season, were also present to collect their rings. The ceremony, which lasted around an hour, ended with stars from other Boston sports teams, including the Celtics' Bill Russell, the Bruins' Bobby Orr and the Patriots' Tedy Bruschi and Richard Seymour, throwing ceremonial first pitches. The presence of Bruschi and Seymour made evident the recent success of Boston-area teams. The day after the Red Sox won the Series, Shaughnessy and the rest of the news media said of the Red Sox home opener: "The team in the third-base dugout? The New York Yankees, Sweet." In a sign of respect, the Red Sox rivals came to the top step of the visitors dugout and gave the Red Sox a standing ovation. The Fenway Park crowd burst into cheers when Yankees pitcher Mariano Rivera was introduced, breaking from the tradition of fans booing opposing players, due to him having blown save opportunities in Games 4 and 5 of the 2004 ALCS. Rivera was a good sport about it and laughed while waving his arms in mock appreciation of the fans.

All right...Forget about ending the curse and having 86 years of baggage erased in one fell swoop. If you don't get emotional watching a group of guys celebrating and hugging when you feel like you know them, when you suffered all the same highs and lows, when you spent the last seven months with them...I mean, why even follow sports at all? (Translation: It's getting a little dusty in here.)

— Bill Simmons' entry in his Game 4 running diary at 8:42 PM Pacific Time, 1 minute after the final out

The following August, Simon & Schuster published Faithful, a book which collected e-mails about the Red Sox between American writers and Red Sox fans Stephen King and Stewart O'Nan during the 2004 season. In March 2005, Houghton Mifflin Company published Reversing the Curse, a book by Shaughnessy, author of the bestselling The Curse of the Bambino, chronicling the 2004 Red Sox season. ESPN's Bill Simmons published Now I Can Die In Peace, a collection of his columns with updated annotations and notes, including columns for each of the last four games of the ALCS and each World Series game – with Game 4 being a running diary. The Farrelly Brothers altered the ending of their 2005 film Fever Pitch – which includes appearances by Damon, Nixon and Varitek – to coincide with the actual end of the series. They and their crew, plus stars Drew Barrymore and Jimmy Fallon, flew to St. Louis and Barrymore and Fallon attended Game 4 in character, complete with the two of them running onto the field at Busch Stadium and kissing once the final out was made.

On May 28, 2014, the team reunited at Fenway Park as the Red Sox celebrated the 10-year anniversary of the historic championship as they hosted the Atlanta Braves. Ramirez threw out the first pitch to Varitek but was cut off by Damon in a reversal of Ramirez once cutting off Damon's throw from center field during a game.

On April 9, 2024, the team reunited again for their 20-year anniversary of the 2004 championship as the Red Sox hosted the Baltimore Orioles on Opening Day at Fenway Park. The pregame ceremony was also in memory of Wakefield, who had died of brain cancer on October 1 at the age of 57, Wakefield's wife Stacy, who had died of pancreatic cancer on February 29 at the age of 53, and Lucchino, who had died of heart failure on April 2 at the age of 78. Tim and Stacy's children – their son Trevor and daughter Brianna – led the 2004 team in from left field, and Brianna threw the ceremonial first pitch to Varitek.

=== Cardinals ===
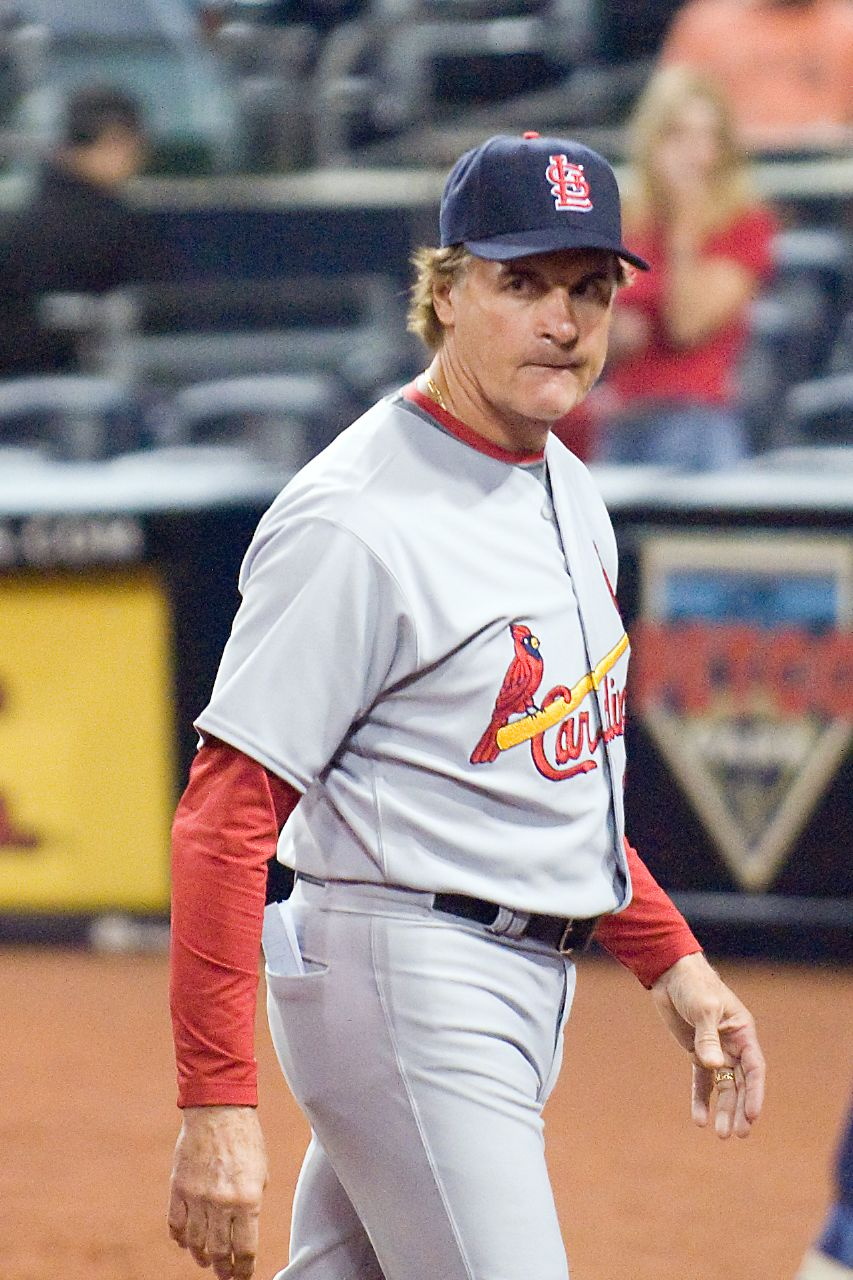
The loss by the Cardinals in the series meant Tony La Russa failed to join Sparky Anderson as managers of World Series championship teams in both leagues. La Russa achieved this in 2006.

On the Cardinals' side, the media expressed disappointment at the team's failure to win a game in the Series after recording the team's best regular season in over 60 years. Many reporters believed that the Cardinals had not played up to their usual standard, and much of the blame was directed at Rolen, Edmonds and Reggie Sanders, three of the Cardinals' best hitters, who had combined for one hit in 39 at bats in the series.

It also marked the last time that Busch Memorial Stadium hosted a World Series. The Cardinals moved to the new Busch Stadium in their championship season of 2006, which was their tenth in franchise history, and first since 1982.

=== 2005 season and beyond ===
Both the Red Sox and Cardinals made the playoffs the following season. The Red Sox lost to the eventual champions the Chicago White Sox, in the American League Division Series, who would go on to end their own curse in the Curse of the Black Sox. The Cardinals, in a repeat meeting of the previous season's National League Championship Series, lost to the Houston Astros. However, the city of Boston would see more success when the New England Patriots won Super Bowl XXXIX, three months after the Red Sox won the World Series, giving the greater Boston area its third championship in 12 months, making it the first time since 1980 that any city had two Super Bowl winners and a World Series winner in a period of the same length.

Both teams also won one of the next three World Series in successive years; the Cardinals, as noted above, in 2006, beating the Detroit Tigers in five games, becoming the first team since the New York Yankees in 1923, to win a World Series championship in their first season in a new stadium (which the Yankees themselves would also do in 2009). Tony La Russa would achieve the distinction that he could not achieve in 2004 of managing World Series winners in both leagues. He would continue to wear number 10 to pay tribute to Sparky Anderson afterwards.

The Red Sox won the World Series the following year, sweeping the Colorado Rockies in four games. Tom Werner, chairman of the Red Sox, and team president Larry Lucchino said that the 2004 championship was "for the parents and grandparents who had suffered through the Curse of the Bambino", while 2007 was "for children, grandchildren, and for Red Sox Nation".

Both teams would meet again in the 2013 World Series, with the Red Sox winning the championship in six games. It was the first time Boston clinched the World Series at its home field, Fenway Park, since 1918. Boston won an additional title in 2018 when they defeated the Los Angeles Dodgers 4 games to 1.

Twelve years after this World Series, the Chicago Cubs would end their own championship drought at 108 years, defeating the Cleveland Indians in seven games in their first World Series appearance in 71 years. Theo Epstein is often credited with helping break two of the best-known championship droughts (curse) in all of sports. Coincidentally, the losing manager in that year's World Series was Terry Francona, who had previously managed the Red Sox championships in 2004 and 2007. The winning manager in that World Series, Joe Maddon, like La Russa, managed pennant winning teams in both leagues, including the 2008 Tampa Bay Rays.

In the 2021 National League Division Series, 2004 Red Sox members faced off against each other as managers, as Dave Roberts' Los Angeles Dodgers beat Gabe Kapler's San Francisco Giants in five games. Four years later, Terry Francona, by then managing the Cincinnati Reds, loss to Roberts' Dodgers in the 2025 National League Wild Card Series.

== See also ==
- 2004 Japan Series
- List of World Series sweeps
- Curse of the Bambino
- Cardinals–Red Sox rivalry

== Sources ==
- 2004 World Series (DVD). Major League Baseball Productions. 2004.
- Shaughnessy, Dan (2005). Reversing the Curse. Boston: Houghton Mifflin Company. ISBN 0-618-51748-0.
- Shaughnessy, Dan (1990). The Curse of the Bambino. New York: Dutton. ISBN 0-525-24887-0.
