= 2003 American League Championship Series =

34th edition of Major League Baseball's American League Championship Series

Team (Wins)	Managers	Season
New York Yankees (4)	Joe Torre	101–61 (.623), GA: 6
Boston Red Sox (3)	Grady Little	95–67 (.586), GB: 6
- Dates: October 8–16
- MVP: Mariano Rivera (New York)
- Umpires: Tim McClelland, Terry Craft, Alfonso Márquez, Derryl Cousins, Joe West, Ángel Hernández

Broadcast
- Television: Fox (United States); MLB International (International)
- TV announcers: Joe Buck, Tim McCarver, Bret Boone, and Chris Myers (Fox); Gary Thorne and Rick Sutcliffe (MLB International)
- Radio: ESPN
- Radio announcers: Jon Miller and Joe Morgan
- ALDS: New York Yankees over Minnesota Twins (3–1); Boston Red Sox over Oakland Athletics (3–2)

The 2003 American League Championship Series (ALCS) was a best-of-seven playoff series in Major League Baseball's 2003 postseason pitting the overall #1 seeded New York Yankees against the fourth-seeded Boston Red Sox for the American League pennant. The Series began on October 8 2003 and ended on October 16 2003. The Yankees held home-field advantage by virtue of having the better regular season record.

The Yankees won the series four games to three to advance to the World Series, where they lost in six games to the National League champion Florida Marlins.

== Summary ==
This series delivered yet another blow to Red Sox fans' hopes of winning a World Series for the first time since 1918. The series seemed evenly matched, with the lead being held first by the Red Sox, then by the Yankees. The Sox forced the series to a full seven games, with the seventh game setting another major league record for the rivalry between the two teams: it marked the first time two major league teams played more than 25 games against each other over the course of a single season. The Red Sox also set an ALCS record with 12 home runs in the series.

=== New York Yankees vs. Boston Red Sox ===
New York won the series, 4–3.

Game	Date	Score	Location	Time	Attendance
1	October 8	Boston Red Sox – 5, New York Yankees – 2	Yankee Stadium (I)	3:20	56,281
2	October 9	Boston Red Sox – 2, New York Yankees – 6	Yankee Stadium (I)	3:05	56,295
3	October 11	New York Yankees – 4, Boston Red Sox – 3	Fenway Park	3:09	34,209
4	October 13	New York Yankees – 2, Boston Red Sox – 3	Fenway Park	2:49	34,599
5	October 14	New York Yankees – 4, Boston Red Sox – 2	Fenway Park	3:04	34,619
6	October 15	Boston Red Sox – 9, New York Yankees – 6	Yankee Stadium (I)	3:57	56,277
7	October 16	Boston Red Sox – 5, New York Yankees – 6 (11)	Yankee Stadium (I)	3:56	56,279

== Game summaries ==
=== Game 1 ===
October 8, 2003 8:18 pm (EDT) at Yankee Stadium (I) in Bronx, New York 67 °F (19 °C), cloudy
Team	1	2	3	4	5	6	7	8	9	R	H	E
Boston	0	0	0	2	2	0	1	0	0	5	13	0
New York	0	0	0	0	0	0	2	0	0	2	3	0
WP: Tim Wakefield (1–0) LP: Mike Mussina (0–1) Sv: Scott Williamson (1); Home runs: BOS: David Ortiz (1), Todd Walker (1), Manny Ramírez (1); NYY: None; Attendance: 56,281; Boxscore

Tim Wakefield shut the Bronx Bombers down for six innings in Game 1, allowing only back-to-back one-out singles to Jorge Posada and Hideki Matsui in the second. Mike Mussina pitched three shutout innings before allowing a leadoff single to Manny Ramirez in the fourth, when the Red Sox began to flex their muscles. David Ortiz homered into the third deck in right field to put the Red Sox up 2–0. Next inning, Todd Walker drove Mussina's first pitch down the right-field line; the ball appeared to strike the foul pole, but was called foul by right field umpire Angel Hernandez. Home plate umpire Tim McClelland immediately overruled him, and awarded Walker home plate. Ramirez followed with a home run later that inning to put the Red Sox ahead 4–0. In the top of the seventh, Jeff Nelson allowed a two-out single to Ramirez and hit Ortiz with a pitch before Kevin Millar's RBI single made it 5–0 Boston. In the bottom of the inning, Wakefield walked Jason Giambi and Bernie Williams before being relieved by Alan Embree, who allowed an RBI double to Posada and sacrifice fly to Matsui to make it 5–2 Boston. But the Yankees did not score again and the Red Sox took a 1–0 series lead, with Scott Williamson earning the save.

=== Game 2 ===
October 9, 2003 8:18 pm (EDT) at Yankee Stadium (I) in Bronx, New York 67 °F (19 °C), cloudy
Team	1	2	3	4	5	6	7	8	9	R	H	E
Boston	0	1	0	0	0	1	0	0	0	2	10	1
New York	0	2	1	0	1	0	2	0	X	6	8	0
WP: Andy Pettitte (1–0) LP: Derek Lowe (0–1); Home runs: BOS: Jason Varitek (1); NYY: Nick Johnson (1); Attendance: 56,295; Boxscore

After leaving the bases loaded in the first, the Red Sox took a 1–0 lead in the second off Andy Pettitte when Jason Varitek hit a leadoff double, moved to third on Trot Nixon's single, and scored on Damian Jackson's single. In the bottom of the inning, Derek Lowe issued a leadoff walk to Jorge Posada and one out later, Nick Johnson's home run put the Yankees up 2–1. Next inning, Lowe allowed three consecutive one-out singles, the last of which, by Bernie Williams, scored Derek Jeter to make it 3–1 Yankees. In the fifth, Williams doubled with one out and scored on a single by Hideki Matsui, who was tagged out at second to end the inning. Varitek's home run in the sixth off Pettitte made it 4–2 Yankees. In the seventh, Lowe allowed a two-out single to Jason Giambi and walked Williams before being relieved by Scott Sauerbeck, who allowed a two-run double to Posada to make it 6–2 Yankees. Their lead held, tying the series at 1–1 heading to Boston.

=== Game 3 ===
October 11, 2003 4:18 pm (EDT) at Fenway Park in Boston, Massachusetts 59 °F (15 °C), cloudy
Team	1	2	3	4	5	6	7	8	9	R	H	E
New York	0	1	1	2	0	0	0	0	0	4	7	0
Boston	2	0	0	0	0	0	1	0	0	3	6	0
WP: Roger Clemens (1–0) LP: Pedro Martínez (0–1) Sv: Mariano Rivera (1); Home runs: NYY: Derek Jeter (1); BOS: None; Attendance: 34,209; Boxscore

Game 3 was highly anticipated, a classic matchup between Red Sox ace Pedro Martínez and former Red Sox pitcher Roger Clemens, who, on the cusp of retirement, was thought to be pitching his last game at Fenway Park. Early on, Karim Garcia was hit in the back by a Martínez fastball. Words were exchanged and Martínez threateningly gestured towards Yankees catcher Jorge Posada. When Garcia was forced out at second, he slid hard into Todd Walker. The following inning, Manny Ramírez took exception to a high Clemens pitch and charged the mound. Both benches cleared, and the resulting brawl turned surreal when 72-year-old Yankees bench coach Don Zimmer charged Martínez. Martínez sidestepped Zimmer, placed his hands on Zimmer's head and propelled Zimmer to the ground. The Zimmer/Martinez altercation ended there as Yankees trainer Gene Monahan and various Yankees players attended to him. After a 13-minute delay, during which Fenway Park stopped all beer sales for the remainder of the game, Clemens struck out Ramirez and proceeded to pitch effectively as the Yankees held a lead. The game did not end quietly: a Fenway groundskeeper got into a scuffle with Yankees reliever Jeff Nelson and Garcia in the middle of the 9th inning in the bullpen area. The employee had cheered a double play the Red Sox turned and Nelson was upset; the employee was taken to the hospital with cleat marks on his back and arm, while Garcia left with a cut hand.

In the bottom of the first, Clemens allowed a leadoff single to Johnny Damon and subsequent double to Todd Walker. After Nomar Garciaparra struck out, Ramirez's double put the Red Sox up 2–0. The Yankees cut it to 2–1 in the second off Martinez when Posada hit a leadoff double and scored on Garcia's single two outs later. Jeter's home run next inning tied the game. In the fourth, Posada drew a leadoff walk, moved to third on Nick Johnson's single, and scored on Matsui's ground-rule double. After Garcia was hit by a pitch to load the bases, Alfonso Soriano hit into a double play that scored Johnson and put the Yankees up 4–2. In the bottom of the seventh, reliever Félix Heredia issued a leadoff walk to Ortiz. Jose Contreras relieved Heredia and allowed a single to Kevin Millar that moved Ortiz to third. Ortiz scored when Trot Nixon hit into a double play to make it 4–3 Yankees. Their lead held, though, putting them up 2–1 in the series.

=== Game 4 ===
October 13, 2003 8:05 pm (EDT) at Fenway Park in Boston, Massachusetts 69 °F (21 °C), clear
Team	1	2	3	4	5	6	7	8	9	R	H	E
New York	0	0	0	0	1	0	0	0	1	2	6	1
Boston	0	0	0	1	1	0	1	0	X	3	6	0
WP: Tim Wakefield (2–0) LP: Mike Mussina (0–2) Sv: Scott Williamson (2); Home runs: NYY: Rubén Sierra (1); BOS: Todd Walker (2), Trot Nixon (1); Attendance: 34,599; Boxscore

Rain postponed Game 4 from Sunday, October 12, to Monday, October 13. The Red Sox went up 1–0 on Todd Walker's second home run of the series in the fourth off Mike Mussina. In the top of the fifth, Tim Wakefield allowed back-to-back one-hit singles before Jeter's double tied the game and put runners on second and third. Bernie Williams walked with two outs to load the bases, but Posada lined out to left to end the inning. In the bottom half, Nixon's home run put the Red Sox up 2–1. They loaded the bases in the seventh off Mussina on a double and two walks with one out when Varitek hit into a force out at second, narrowly beating Soriano's throw to first to avoid a double play and allow Millar to score to make it 3–1. Ruben Sierra's one-out home run in the ninth off Scott Williamson made it 3–2, but Williamson struck out David Dellucci and Soriano to end the game, pick up his second save of the series, and tie the series at 2–2.

=== Game 5 ===
October 14, 2003 4:18 pm (EDT) at Fenway Park in Boston, Massachusetts 59 °F (15 °C), overcast
Team	1	2	3	4	5	6	7	8	9	R	H	E
New York	0	3	0	0	0	0	0	1	0	4	7	1
Boston	0	0	0	1	0	0	0	1	0	2	6	1
WP: David Wells (1–0) LP: Derek Lowe (0–2) Sv: Mariano Rivera (2); Home runs: NYY: None; BOS: Manny Ramírez (2); Attendance: 34,619; Boxscore

The Yankees loaded the bases in the second off Derek Lowe on two walks and a hit when Garcia's single scored two, then Soriano's single scored another. Ramirez's leadoff home run in the fourth off David Wells made it 3–1. They made it 4–1 in the eighth when Bernie Williams reached on a force out at second, moved to third on Posada's single and scored on Matsui's groundout off Alan Embree. In the bottom of the inning, Todd Walker hit a leadoff triple off Mariano Rivera and scored on Garciaparra's groundout to make it 4–2 Yankees. Rivera, though, shut out the Red Sox for the rest of the game, leaving the Yankees one win away from the World Series.

=== Game 6 ===
October 15, 2003 4:18 pm (EDT) at Yankee Stadium (I) in Bronx, New York 62 °F (17 °C), windy and cloudy
Team	1	2	3	4	5	6	7	8	9	R	H	E
Boston	0	0	4	0	0	0	3	0	2	9	16	1
New York	1	0	0	4	1	0	0	0	0	6	12	2
WP: Alan Embree (1–0) LP: José Contreras (0–1) Sv: Scott Williamson (3); Home runs: BOS: Jason Varitek (2), Trot Nixon (2); NYY: Jason Giambi (1), Jorge Posada (1); Attendance: 56,277; Boxscore

Jason Giambi's two-out home run in the first off John Burkett put the Yankees up 1–0, but Varitek's leadoff home run in the third off Andy Pettitte tied the score. The Red Sox loaded the bases with one out on two walks and a single before Ortiz's single scored two and Millar's single scored another to put them up 4–1. In the bottom of the fourth, Posada and Matsui hit back-to-back one-out singles before Nick Johnson's double and Aaron Boone's groundout scored a run each. Garciaparra's error allowed Garcia to reach base before Soriano's two-run double put the Yankees on top, 5–4, and ended Burkett's night. Posada's home run next inning off Bronson Arroyo made it 6–4 Yankees. In the top of the seventh, Garciaparra hit a leadoff triple off Jose Contreras and scored on Matsui's errant throw to third. Ramirez then doubled, moved to third on a wild pitch, and scored on Ortiz's single to tie the game. After allowing a one-out single to Bill Mueller, Contreras was relieved by Félix Heredia, who struck out Trot Nixon, but threw a wild pitch that put runners on second and third. After intentionally walking Varitek to load the bases, Heredia walked Damon to force in a run and put the Red Sox up 7–6. They added insurance in the ninth when Mueller doubled with one out off Jeff Nelson. Gabe White relieved Nelson and allowed a home run to Nixon to make it 9–6. Scott Williamson retired the Yankees in order in the bottom half for his third save of the series, forcing a Game 7.

=== Game 7 ===
October 16, 2003 8:18 pm (EDT) at Yankee Stadium (I) in Bronx, New York 61 °F (16 °C), clear
Team	1	2	3	4	5	6	7	8	9	10	11	R	H	E
Boston	0	3	0	1	0	0	0	1	0	0	0	5	11	0
New York	0	0	0	0	1	0	1	3	0	0	1	6	11	1
WP: Mariano Rivera (1–0) LP: Tim Wakefield (2–1); Home runs: BOS: Trot Nixon (3), Kevin Millar (1), David Ortiz (2); NYY: Jason Giambi 2 (3), Aaron Boone (1); Attendance: 56,279; Boxscore

In the Martinez–Clemens rematch of Game 3, Clemens allowed a one-out single to Millar before Nixon's home run put Boston up 2–0. After Mueller struck out, Varitek doubled and scored on third baseman Enrique Wilson's throwing error to first on Damon's ground ball. Millar's leadoff home run in the fourth made it 4–0 Boston. Nixon then walked and moved to third on Mueller's single to knock Clemens out of the game. In the first relief appearance of his career, Mike Mussina cleaned up Clemens's mess by striking out Varitek and inducing a Johnny Damon double play. His three innings of scoreless relief, and home runs in the fifth and seventh innings by Giambi kept the Yankees in the game.

But in the eighth inning, with the Red Sox leading 5–2 after Ortiz homered in the top half off David Wells, things unraveled for Boston. Sox manager Grady Little kept a tiring Martínez in for the eighth, a controversial move still discussed years later. Little had two relievers who had shown effectiveness in the games leading up to the seventh game—Scott Williamson and Mike Timlin (who had not allowed a single hit in the playoffs), but both had experienced stretches of ineffectiveness during the season, while Martínez had Hall of Fame credentials. Critics of the move note that Martínez had experienced diminished effectiveness in the late innings of games in which he had thrown more than 100 pitches. After Martínez recorded the first out of the inning, he gave up a double to Jeter and an RBI single to Bernie Williams, prompting Little to go to the mound. To the surprise of many, Little left Martínez in the game, leaving lefty Alan Embree in the bullpen with the left-handed Matsui coming to the plate. Martínez gave up a ground rule double to Matsui and a two-run bloop double to Posada to tie the game, sending it to extra innings. Mariano Rivera came in for the ninth and pitched three shutout innings.

Tim Wakefield pitched a scoreless tenth for Boston and in the bottom of the 11th faced Aaron Boone, who had entered earlier as a pinch-runner. On Wakefield's first pitch of the inning, Boone launched a walk-off home run into the left field seats, sending the Yankees to the World Series. Fox Sports displayed a collection of images thereafter: tears welling up in the eyes of Aaron's brother, Seattle Mariners infielder Bret Boone (the guest announcer), ALCS MVP Rivera running to the mound and collapsing on it in joy, Boone jumping on home plate, and Rivera being carried off on his teammates' shoulders.

Boone became just the second player in MLB history to end a Game 7 of a postseason series with a walk-off home run; the only other player is Bill Mazeroski, who did so in the 1960 World Series for the Pittsburgh Pirates (ironically against the Yankees).

John Sterling: Well, we’re tied at five as we go to the bottom of the eleventh; here's Aaron Boone to lead off.

Charley Steiner: His first at bat of the game; there's a fly ball deep to left, it's on its way! There it goes, and the Yankees are going to the World Series! Aaron Boone has hit a home run! The Yankees go to the World Series for the thirty-ninth time in their remarkable history! Aaron Boone down the left field line; they are waiting for him at home plate, and now he dives into the scrum! The Yankees win it, six to five!
Sterling: Ballgame over! American League Championship Series over! Yankees win…

Together: Theeeeee Yankees win!

- The radio call of Boone's home run over the Yankees Radio Network

== Composite box ==
2003 ALCS (4–3): New York Yankees over Boston Red Sox

Team	1	2	3	4	5	6	7	8	9	10	11	R	H	E
New York Yankees	1	6	2	6	4	0	5	4	1	0	1	30	54	5
Boston Red Sox	2	4	4	5	3	1	6	2	2	0	0	29	68	3
Total attendance: 328,559 Average attendance: 46,937

== Series stats ==
=== Boston Red Sox ===
==== Batting ====
Note: GP=Games Played; AB=At Bats; R=Runs; H=Hits; 2B=Doubles; 3B=Triples; HR=Home Runs; RBI=Runs Batted In; BB=Walks; AVG=Batting Average; OBP=On Base Percentage; SLG=Slugging Percentage

Player	GP	AB	R	H	2B	3B	HR	RBI	BB	AVG	OBP	SLG	Reference
Jason Varitek	6	20	4	6	2	0	2	3	1	.300	.333	.700	
Kevin Millar	7	29	3	7	0	0	1	3	1	.241	.267	.345	
Todd Walker	7	27	5	10	1	1	2	2	1	.370	.414	.704	
Bill Mueller	7	27	1	6	2	0	0	0	2	.222	.276	.296	
Nomar Garciaparra	7	29	2	7	0	1	0	1	2	.241	.290	.310	
Manny Ramirez	7	29	6	9	1	0	2	4	1	.310	.333	.552	
Johnny Damon	5	20	1	4	1	0	0	1	3	.200	.304	.250	
Trot Nixon	7	24	3	8	1	0	3	5	3	.333	.429	.750	
David Ortiz	7	26	4	7	1	0	2	6	3	.269	.367	.538	
Gabe Kapler	3	8	0	1	0	0	0	0	0	.125	.125	.125	
Doug Mirabelli	3	7	0	2	0	0	0	0	0	.286	.286	.286	
Damian Jackson	5	3	0	1	0	0	0	1	0	.333	.333	.333	
David McCarty	1	1	0	0	0	0	0	0	0	.000	.000	.000	

==== Pitching ====
Note: G=Games Played; GS=Games Started; IP=Innings Pitched; H=Hits; BB=Walks; R=Runs; ER=Earned Runs; SO=Strikeouts; W=Wins; L=Losses; SV=Saves; ERA=Earned Run Average

Player	G	GS	IP	H	BB	R	ER	SO	W	L	SV	ERA	Reference
Pedro Martínez	2	2	14 1/3	16	2	9	9	14	0	1	0	5.65	
Derek Lowe	2	2	14	14	7	10	10	5	0	2	0	6.43	
Tim Wakefield	3	2	14	8	6	4	4	10	2	1	0	2.57	
Mike Timlin	5	0	5 1/3	1	2	0	0	6	0	0	0	0.00	
Alan Embree	5	0	4 2/3	3	0	0	0	1	1	0	0	0.00	
John Burkett	1	1	3 2/3	7	0	5	3	1	0	0	0	7.36	
Bronson Arroyo	3	0	3 1/3	2	2	1	1	5	0	0	0	2.70	
Scott Williamson	3	0	3	1	0	1	1	6	0	0	3	3.00	
Todd Jones	1	0	0 1/3	1	1	0	0	1	0	0	0	0.00	
Scott Sauerbeck	1	0	0 1/3	1	1	0	0	0	0	0	0	0.00	

=== New York Yankees ===
==== Batting ====
Note: GP=Games Played; AB=At Bats; R=Runs; H=Hits; 2B=Doubles; 3B=Triples; HR=Home Runs; RBI=Runs Batted In; BB=Walks; AVG=Batting Average; OBP=On Base Percentage; SLG=Slugging Percentage

Player	GP	AB	R	H	2B	3B	HR	RBI	BB	AVG	OBP	SLG	Reference
Jorge Posada	7	27	5	8	4	0	1	6	3	.296	.367	.556	
Nick Johnson	7	26	4	6	1	0	1	3	2	.231	.286	.385	
Alfonso Soriano	7	30	0	4	1	0	0	3	1	.133	.188	.167	
Aaron Boone	7	17	2	3	0	0	1	2	1	.176	.263	.353	
Derek Jeter	7	30	3	7	2	0	1	2	2	.233	.281	.400	
Hideki Matsui	7	26	3	8	3	0	0	4	1	.308	.321	.423	
Bernie Williams	7	26	5	5	1	0	0	2	4	.192	.300	.231	
Karim Garcia	5	16	1	4	0	0	0	3	2	.250	.368	.250	
Jason Giambi	7	26	4	6	0	0	3	3	4	.231	.333	.577	
Enrique Wilson	2	7	0	1	0	0	0	0	0	.143	.143	.143	
David Dellucci	3	3	2	1	0	0	0	0	0	.333	.500	.333	
Juan Rivera	2	2	0	0	0	0	0	0	0	.000	.000	.000	
Rubén Sierra	3	2	1	1	0	0	1	1	1	.500	667	2.000	

==== Pitching ====
Note: G=Games Played; GS=Games Started; IP=Innings Pitched; H=Hits; BB=Walks; R=Runs; ER=Earned Runs; SO=Strikeouts; W=Wins; L=Losses; SV=Saves; ERA=Earned Run Average

Player	G	GS	IP	H	BB	R	ER	SO	W	L	SV	ERA	Reference
Mike Mussina	3	2	15 1/3	16	4	7	7	17	0	2	0	4.11	
Andy Pettitte	2	2	11 2/3	17	4	6	6	10	1	0	0	4.63	
Roger Clemens	2	2	9	11	2	6	5	8	1	0	0	5.00	
Mariano Rivera	4	0	8	5	0	1	1	6	1	0	2	1.12	
David Wells	2	1	7 2/3	5	2	2	2	5	1	0	0	2.35	
José Contreras	4	0	4 2/3	6	2	3	3	7	0	1	0	5.79	
Jeff Nelson	4	0	3	4	0	2	2	3	0	0	0	6.00	
Félix Heredia	5	0	2 2/3	0	3	1	1	3	0	0	0	3.38	
Gabe White	2	0	2	4	0	1	1	1	0	0	0	4.50	

== Aftermath ==
The series is widely considered one of the most devastating losses in Boston sports history. The loss was crushing for Red Sox fans, many of whom blamed Little for leaving Martínez in the game since Martínez had experienced difficulty beyond 100 pitches. In his book Now I Can Die in Peace, Bill Simmons writes that the Boston owners and Theo Epstein had ordered Little to remove Martínez from the game when he finished the seventh inning and/or topped the three-digit pitch count. Martínez was sure he would not be called on for the eighth inning, but agreed to pitch when Little asked. After the game, Little reportedly prophetically told Martínez, "Petey, I might not be here anymore." Little defended his move by saying he felt that even a tired Martínez was the best option. Little's defenders also noted that the Red Sox offense collapsed in the game, as the club scored only two runs in the last nine innings, and also noted Damon's poor defensive play in center field during the crucial inning. Others have noted that by staying with a physically fragile pitcher in an ultimate game with two runners on base, a three-run lead, a rested pitcher who had performed well in the postseason ready in the bullpen and the other team's MVP on deck, Little did exactly what Hall of Fame manager Walter Alston did with Sandy Koufax in Game 7 of the 1965 World Series, which Alston's Dodgers won. Little's contract was not renewed after the season and he was replaced by Terry Francona. Little went on to manage the Los Angeles Dodgers before being replaced by Joe Torre after the 2007 season.

Boone's pennant-clinching home run often draws comparisons to another famous Yankee home run against the Red Sox in the postseason: the one Bucky Dent hit in a one-game playoff between the two teams that decided the American League East division title in 1978. But the Yankees won the World Series that year, against the Dodgers. As with Dent, Boone has had the expletive "Fucking" assigned as a middle name by Red Sox fans in the following years.

Until the final game of the pennant race, some baseball fans had been hoping for a rematch of the 1918 World Series between the Red Sox and the Chicago Cubs, one of only two major league teams to have played for a longer period of time since winning the World Series (the other was the Chicago White Sox, who won the Series in 2005). The Cubs reached the 2003 National League Championship Series against the Florida Marlins. As with the Red Sox, they had a three-run lead and were only five outs away from reaching the World Series, although this was in Game 6, when the Marlins scored eight runs in that inning and won the game 8–3. The Marlins won Game 7, 9–6, to advance to the World Series, where they defeated the Yankees, four games to two. The Cubs did not reach the World Series until 2016, winning in seven games over the Cleveland Indians.

The following year, Boston and New York met again in the ALCS, with Boston becoming the first team in major league history—as well as just the third team in American professional sports history—to come back to win a playoff series after being down three games to none; they then swept the St. Louis Cardinals in the World Series to win their first championship since 1918 and thus end the Curse of the Bambino.

In the 2005–06 offseason, the rivalry between Boston and New York revived the Yankees' loss to the Marlins in the 2003 World Series when they traded Josh Beckett, the pitcher who pitched a complete-game shutout against the Yankees in the deciding game of the Series, to the Red Sox.

The Yankees eventually hired postseason hero Boone as their manager in 2018. The two teams have met in the postseason four times during his tenure (2018, 2021, 2025, 2026), with Boston winning the first two and the Yankees winning the latter two; in 2018, the Red Sox beat the Yankees en route to becoming the first team to win two World Series exactly one century apart, a feat that Boone kept them from doing in 2003, as the Red Sox won the inaugural World Series.

Produced by National Hockey League Hall of Fame player Mark Messier in 2024, Amazon Prime spotlighted the 2003 ALCS in their series documentary 'Game 7'.

== Notable performers ==
- Trot Nixon—.333 average, three home runs, five RBI
- David Ortiz, Manny Ramírez, Jason Varitek, Todd Walker—two home runs each.
- Tim Wakefield—Won Game 1 and Game 4 for the Red Sox, and very likely would have been the ALCS MVP had Boston held on to win the series.
- Jorge Posada—.296 average, four doubles
- Mariano Rivera—eight innings, 1.12 ERA, two saves (Series MVP)
- Mike Timlin and Alan Embree (combined)—ten innings, four hits, no earned runs
- Mike Mussina and Rivera—six innings, six strikeouts, four hits, and zero earned runs combined in relief during Game 7.
- Jason Giambi—Before the eighth inning rally in Game 7, Giambi had provided the Yankees' only offense with two solo home runs off Pedro Martínez.
- Aaron Boone—Hit an 11th inning walk-off home run in Game 7.
