= Grady Little =

American baseball coach and manager (born 1950)

- Manager
- Born: March 30, 1950 (age 76); Abilene, Texas, U.S.
- Bats: Right Throws: Right

Managerial statistics
- Games managed: 648
- Win–loss record: 358–290
- Winning %: .552
- Stats at Baseball Reference

Teams
- As manager: Boston Red Sox (2002–2003); Los Angeles Dodgers (2006–2007); As coach: San Diego Padres (1996); Boston Red Sox (1997–1999); Cleveland Indians (2000–2001)

William Grady Little (born March 30, 1950) is an American former player and manager in Major League Baseball (MLB). He managed the Boston Red Sox from 2002 to 2003 and the Los Angeles Dodgers from 2006 to 2007. He recently served in the front office for the Pittsburgh Pirates.

In his second season with the Red Sox, Little guided the team to a record of 95–67 and an appearance in the 2003 American League Championship Series against the New York Yankees. Despite his accomplishments, Little is best remembered for his decision to leave starting pitcher Pedro Martínez in the eighth inning of Game 7 while the Red Sox held a three-run lead, and faced blame for the team's subsequent loss when the Yankees were able to tie the score and win in extra innings.

== Playing career ==
He graduated from Garinger High School in Charlotte, North Carolina, before he was selected by the Atlanta Braves in the 15th round of the 1968 MLB draft.

After spending the 1969 season in the Marine reserves, Grady played in 167 games as a catcher over five minor-league seasons in the Braves and New York Yankees organizations. He posted a career .207 batting average with two home runs and 37 runs batted in. He retired from playing in 1973.

== Coaching career ==
From 1996 to 2001, Little served as a coach for the Padres, Red Sox, and Indians.

=== High school ===
Grady Little was working in the front office of the Pittsburgh Pirates and spent time as the head of baseball operations as well as head coach for the varsity baseball team at Hickory Grove Christian School in Charlotte, North Carolina.

=== Minor leagues ===
Little became a player–coach for the West Haven Yankees while still playing in 1971 and continued through his retirement as a player, remaining as a coach with West Haven until 1974.

During the 1975–79 seasons he stayed away from baseball and worked as a cotton farmer.

He managed in the minor leagues for 16 years, compiling a record of 1,054–903 (.539).

While serving as the manager for the Durham Bulls, Little served as a baseball trainer for the cast of the movie Bull Durham.

== Managing career ==
=== Boston Red Sox (2002–2003) ===
In March 2002, the Boston Red Sox hired Little as their manager. Little was enormously popular with his players as he enhanced the loose nature of the clubhouse and supported struggling players. His tenure was successful, as the Red Sox won a combined 188 games in his two seasons and nearly took the pennant in 2003.

However, the 2003 season (and Little's entire tenure with the Red Sox) is mostly remembered for his controversial decision during Game 7 of the 2003 American League Championship Series against the New York Yankees. The Red Sox led the game 5–2 in the 8th inning, and were five outs away from reaching the World Series. Little visited the mound after starting pitcher Pedro Martínez gave up two hits, including a double from Derek Jeter and a single that scored him, but he decided against taking out the ace pitcher, who had thrown 115 pitches to that point. After a ground rule double from Hideki Matsui in the next at-bat, the Yankees tied the game with the following at-bat when Jorge Posada hit a two-run bloop double, and went on to win the game (and the pennant) in the 11th inning off of a home run by Aaron Boone.

Little was the target of great angst in the aftermath of the Red Sox' loss (which turned out to be the final manifestation of the so-called Curse of the Bambino). Critics pointed out that Martinez' ERA almost tripled when his pitch count exceeded 100, and the Red Sox had three well-rested relief pitchers (Alan Embree, Mike Timlin, and Scott Williamson) in the bullpen waiting to take over in the eighth inning with a three-run lead. In fact, the strong performance of the bullpen in relief of Martinez that day would seem to suggest that Little's decision was ultimately responsible for the Game 7 ALCS result. Supporters responded that Little's decision to trust Martinez was in keeping with his intuitive style that had brought the Red Sox that far in the first place. Nevertheless, the Red Sox front office decided a change was needed and declined to renew Little's contract.

In his post mortem of Little's ouster, sportswriter Rob Neyer argued that Little had ignored reams of data that showed Martinez was not the same pitcher after 105-110 pitches. As Neyer put it, Little "didn't make the decision he'd been told to make" by Red Sox management.

He was replaced by Terry Francona, who would go on to manage the club from 2004 to 2011 and lead them to World Series titles in 2004 and 2007.

When Little's contract was not renewed by the Red Sox, the independent minor-league Brockton Rox announced plans to give away Grady Little bobble arm dolls to the first 1,000 fans to attend the May 29, 2004, game. The doll's arm bounces to simulate a manager's call to the bullpen, displays the date October 16, 2003 (the date of Game 7 of the ALCS) and Little's win total from the 2002 and 2003 seasons. The plans were canceled when Little objected to his likeness being used. In an agreement with the Rox, Little permitted the dolls to be sold with the provision that the money raised from the sale would go "to the Professional Baseball Scouting Foundation, which provides relief to retired scouts in financial peril". The initial selling price was $38.36 (two times $19.18, 1918 being the last time the Red Sox won the World Series) but later auctions of autographed versions sold for as high as $255.

=== Los Angeles Dodgers (2006–2007) ===
Little spent 2004 and 2005 as a consultant, instructor, and scout with the Chicago Cubs. On December 8, 2005, after an organizational shakeup that resulted in the dismissal of both manager Jim Tracy and general manager Paul DePodesta, the Los Angeles Dodgers turned to Little to be the team's seventh manager since its 1958 move to Los Angeles. As manager of the Dodgers, Little was reunited with several players from the 2002–2003 Boston Red Sox teams, including pitcher Derek Lowe, third baseman Bill Mueller, and shortstop-turned-first baseman Nomar Garciaparra. Little and new general manager Ned Colletti were widely credited for bringing a fresh outlook to a team that had been wracked by instability over the previous decade. The Dodgers won 88 games in 2006 and earned the NL wild-card spot in the playoffs during Little's first season; however, they were swept by the New York Mets in the NLDS. Plagued by injuries to several key players and fielding a lineup loaded with youngsters, the Dodgers failed to reach the playoffs in 2007.

Dodgers general manager Ned Colletti initially confirmed that Little would return as manager of the ballclub in 2008. However, Little appeared hesitant to do so after Colletti partly blamed him and his staff for the Dodgers' disappointing 2007 season. Little failed to contact Colletti for over two weeks. This resulted in Colletti entering into a tentative agreement with Joe Girardi, and when it fell through, negotiations with Joe Torre began. Citing personal reasons, Little subsequently resigned on October 30, 2007.

== Front-office career ==
=== Pittsburgh Pirates (2014–present) ===
On December 8, 2014, Little joined the Pittsburgh Pirates as a senior advisor to the team's front office.

== Managerial record ==
Team	Year	Regular season					Postseason			
Team	Year	Games	Won	Lost	Win %	Finish	Won	Lost	Win %	Result
BOS	2002	162	93	69	.574	2nd in AL East	–	–	–	–
BOS	2003	162	95	67	.586	2nd in AL East	6	6	.500	Lost ALCS (NYY)
BOS total		324	188	136	.580		6	6	.500	
LAD	2006	162	88	74	.543	2nd in NL West	0	3	.000	Lost NLDS (NYM)
LAD	2007	162	82	80	.506	4th in NL West	–	–	–	–
LAD total		324	170	154	.525		0	3	.000	
Total		648	358	290	.552		6	9	.400	

== Personal life ==
Little with his wife, Debi, have a son, Eric, and three grandchildren (Braden, Luke, and Jace). His brother Bryan Little is a former major league infielder. He was inducted into the Kinston, North Carolina Professional Baseball Hall of Fame in 2001, Charlotte, North Carolina Baseball Hall of Fame in 1985, and was inducted into the Hagerstown Suns Hall of Fame on April 13, 2009.

Sporting positions
Preceded by J. R. Miner	Bluefield Orioles manager 1980	Succeeded by Lance Nichols
Preceded by First manager	Hagerstown Suns manager 1981–1982	Succeeded by John Hart
Preceded by John Hart	Charlotte Orioles manager 1983–1984	Succeeded by Len Johnston
Preceded by Mark Wiley	Hagerstown Suns manager 1984	Succeeded by Len Johnston
Preceded by Doug Ault	Kinston Blue Jays manager 1985	Succeeded by
Preceded by Craig Robinson	Pulaski Braves manager 1986–1987	Succeeded by Cloyd Boyer
Preceded by Buddy Bailey	Durham Bulls manager 1988–1991	Succeeded by Leon Roberts
Preceded by Chris Chambliss	Greenville Braves manager 1992	Succeeded by Bruce Kimm
Preceded by Tim Johnson	Boston Red Sox bench coach 1997–1999	Succeeded by Buddy Bailey
Preceded by Chris Chambliss	Richmond Braves manager 1993–1995	Succeeded by Bill Dancy
