= Trot Nixon =

American baseball player (born 1974)

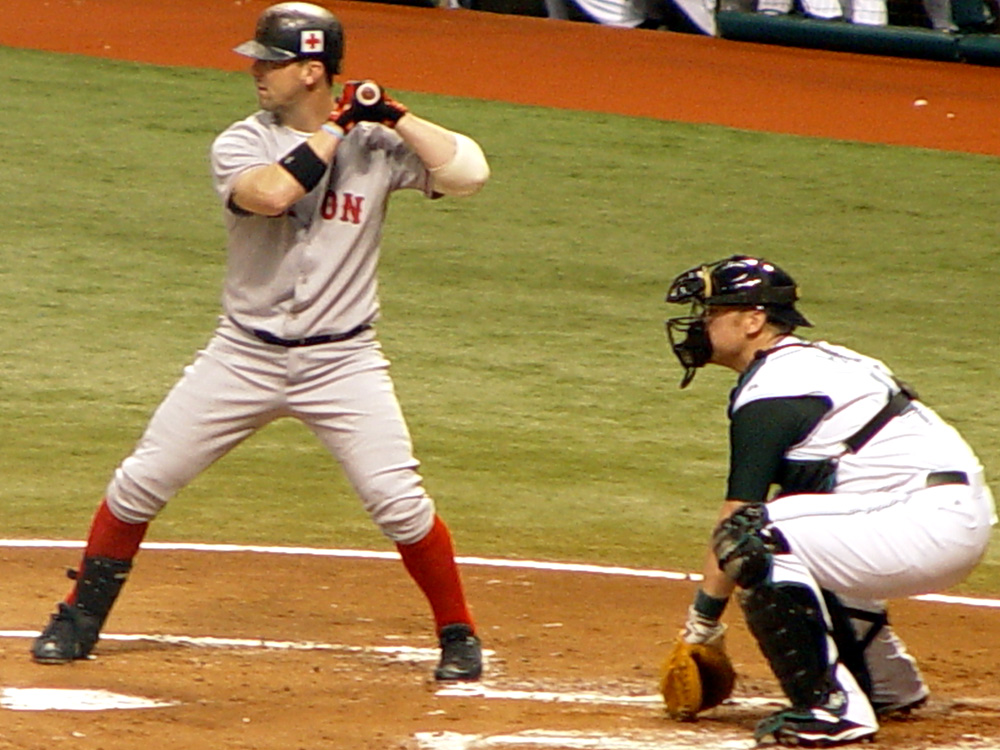
- Nixon with the Red Sox in 2005
- Right fielder
- Born: April 11, 1974 (age 52); Durham, North Carolina, U.S.
- Batted: Left Threw: Left

MLB debut
- September 21, 1996, for the Boston Red Sox

Last MLB appearance
- June 28, 2008, for the New York Mets

MLB statistics
- Batting average: .274
- Home runs: 137
- Runs batted in: 555
- Stats at Baseball Reference

Teams
- Boston Red Sox (1996, 1998–2006); Cleveland Indians (2007); New York Mets (2008)

Career highlights and awards
- World Series champion (2004); Boston Red Sox Hall of Fame

Christopher Trotman "Trot" Nixon (born April 11, 1974), nicknamed "Dirt Dog", is an American former professional baseball right fielder. He played in Major League Baseball (MLB) from 1996 through 2008, primarily with the Boston Red Sox from 1996 through 2006, where he was a fan favorite for his scrappy play. With the Red Sox, he won the 2004 World Series. His career wound down with limited appearances for the Cleveland Indians in 2007 and the New York Mets in 2008. He currently serves as co-host/analyst for "The 5th Quarter," a high school football highlight show on WWAY-TV in his hometown of Wilmington, North Carolina.

== Youth and high school career ==
Nixon was born in Durham, North Carolina, and attended New Hanover High School in Wilmington, North Carolina. As a senior, he was named the State Player of the Year in both football and baseball. In football, as a senior, he broke school passing records held by former National Football League quarterbacks Sonny Jurgensen and Roman Gabriel. In baseball, as a senior, he was named Baseball America High School Player of the Year and the State Player of the Year, and also led his baseball team to the North Carolina 4A state title. He finished his senior season with a .512 batting average, 12 home runs, and a state-record 56 RBI, and pitched 40 innings with a 12–0 record and a 0.40 ERA.

He was slated to play both football and baseball at NC State on a scholarship, and when negotiations with the Boston Red Sox continued to the fall, Nixon participated in fall practice at NC State. He eventually signed with the Boston Red Sox at the signing deadline, the day classes began.

== Professional career ==
=== Boston Red Sox ===
Nixon was drafted by the Red Sox in the 1st round of the 1993 Major League Baseball draft, and was the seventh pick overall. He split the 1994-1998 seasons between several A, AA, and AAA minor league teams, with two brief stints with the Red Sox on the major league level in 1996 and 1998.

Nixon's first full season in the majors was in 1999, when he played in 124 games and hit .270 with 15 home runs and 52 RBIs. He came in 9th place in Rookie of the Year voting with just a single vote point (Carlos Beltrán of the Kansas City Royals won the award in a landslide).

Nixon quickly became a fan favorite for his scrappy, enthusiastic gameplay. He was considered the inspiration for the expression "Boston Dirt Dogs." The signature is that of a "scrapper," a player who hustles and usually gets his uniform dirty during games.

After a decent 2000 season, Nixon produced career highs (at the time) during the 2001 season with a .280 batting average, 27 home runs, and 88 RBIs.

The 2002 season was also a good one for Nixon: he posted career bests in doubles (36) and RBIs (94). On May 5, 2002, in response to several hits by pitches, Nixon threw his bat in the direction of Tampa Bay Devil Rays pitcher Ryan Rupe, pretending that the bat slipped out of his hands while swinging. In response, Bob Watson, the Major League Baseball vice president in charge of discipline, fined him $2,000 and suspended him for four games.

Nixon had the best year of his career in 2003, batting .306 with 28 home runs and 87 RBIs. On October 4, 2003, in Game 3 of the American League Division Series, he had the most prominent moment of his career. Nixon was called from the bench as a pinch hitter in the bottom of the 11th. With the Red Sox facing elimination, Nixon lined a two-run homer over the center field wall for a 3–1 Boston victory. The Red Sox went on to win the next two games, stunning the Oakland Athletics with a 3-2 series win and advancing to the American League Championship Series against the New York Yankees. The Red Sox lost the ALCS in seven games despite Nixon batting .333 (8 for 24) with 3 home runs and 5 RBIs in the series.

During the 2004 season, Nixon was unavailable for several months due to a herniated disc and a tight thigh muscle. Upon his return, he generally worked as the starting right fielder during the regular and post-season. In the deciding game of the 2004 World Series, Nixon hit a two-out, two-run double off the right field wall at Busch Stadium in St. Louis in the top of the third inning to give Boston a 3–0 lead. Those were the last runs either team scored in that game as the Red Sox swept the Cardinals for the team's first World Series title in 86 years. For the series, Nixon batted .357 (5 for 14) with 3 doubles and 3 RBIs.

Nixon also endeared himself to Sox fans by briefly wearing a mohawk hairstyle, one of many unconventional hairstyles the Sox sported over the course of the 2004 season.

Loved by Boston's fans, Nixon is known for an extremely volatile temper and steadfast dedication to his teammates. In August 2005, while officially on the disabled list, Nixon remained in uniform and in the dugout with the rest of the team during the game. When teammate Gabe Kapler (who often acted as Nixon's right field replacement) hit a long fly ball off of the Green Monster, the umpires ruled it a double. Nixon leapt off the bench and argued with such passion that Kapler's hit had been a home run (television replays confirmed that the hit had landed above the home run line, and thus should have been ruled a two-run homer) that he was ejected from the game.

On October 1, 2006, with two outs in the fifth inning of the final game of the season, manager Terry Francona replaced Nixon in right field with rookie David Murphy. Knowing Nixon might be playing his final game with the Sox, the fans gave him a grateful ovation as he ran off the field. Said Nixon, when asked if it was difficult playing what may have been his last game for the Red Sox:

There were a couple of times—my first at-bat and coming out of the game. It really was, because this is the only organization I've ever known. There was [sic] definitely a couple of times out there that I did want to break down. I really did care about this organization. I did care about this town. I think this town has been unbelievable for my family and me. Absolutely unbelievable. I think there's a lot of guys in this organization who feel the same way.

— Trot Nixon, The Patriot Ledger

After the 2006 season, the Red Sox did not offer Nixon salary arbitration as the team pursued and eventually signed free agent J. D. Drew and had a fourth outfielder, Wily Mo Peña, on the roster.

=== Cleveland Indians ===
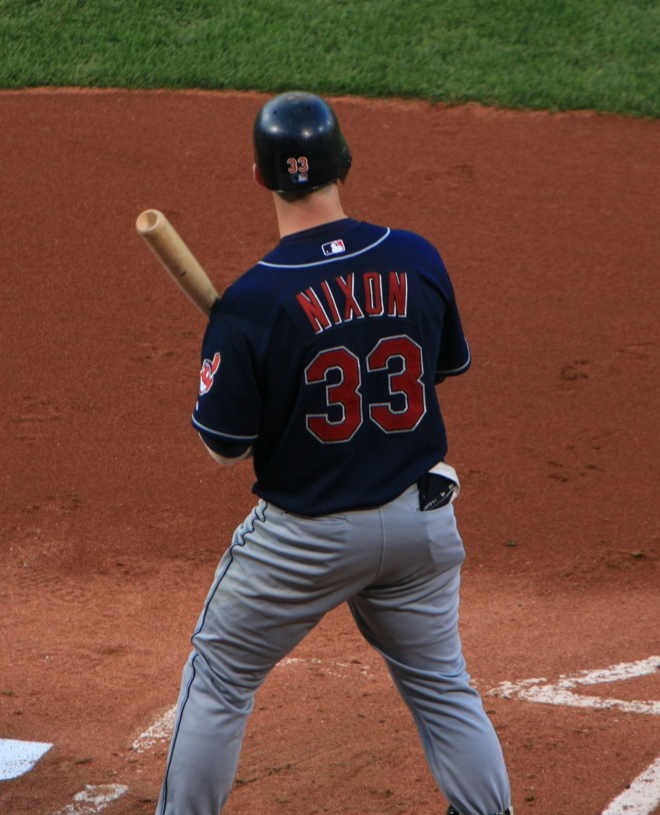
Nixon with the Cleveland Indians in 2007

In January 2007, Nixon signed a one-year, $3 million contract with the Cleveland Indians. Instead of wearing number 7 as he had in Boston, Nixon chose number 33. The decision was made in part by his son Chase, based on the fact that Nixon turned 33 years old that April.

=== Arizona Diamondbacks ===
In February 2008, he signed a minor league contract with an invitation to spring training with the Arizona Diamondbacks and was subsequently sent to their Triple-A affiliate the Tucson Sidewinders.

=== New York Mets ===
On June 13, 2008, Nixon was acquired by the New York Mets from the Diamondbacks for cash considerations and a player to be named later. The Mets acquired him to replace injured outfielder Moisés Alou. He was added to the Mets roster on June 15, replacing outfielder Chris Aguila, who was designated for assignment. The same day he was activated, Nixon started in right field against the Texas Rangers. However, he finished the season on the disabled list.

=== Milwaukee Brewers ===
On December 18, 2008, Nixon signed a minor league contract with the Milwaukee Brewers. He was put onto the inactive roster. After his release from the Brewers in March 2009, Nixon retired from baseball.

=== Legacy ===
In 1,092 games over 12 seasons, Nixon posted a .274 batting average (995-for-3627) with 579 runs, 222 doubles, 28 triples, 137 home runs, 555 RBI, 30 stolen bases, 504 bases on balls, a .364 on-base percentage, and a .464 slugging percentage. Defensively, he recorded a .983 fielding percentage, primarily as a right fielder but also in center and left field. In 42 postseason games, he was productive, batting .283 (39-for-138) with 18 runs, 11 doubles, 6 home runs, 25 RBI and 14 walks.

Nixon was often described as a "Dirt Dog", and nicknamed "the Dirt Dog" or the "original dirt dog".

He was known for wearing a hat covered in dirt, as well as a dirty batting helmet.

The area of Connecticut between Boston and New York City has been referred to as the "Munson–Nixon line", a play on the Mason–Dixon line, after Nixon and former Yankee Thurman Munson. Steve Rushin, who coined the term in a 2003 Sports Illustrated article, has pinpointed the line as running north of New Haven, south of Hartford, and along the width of central Connecticut.

In 2010, Red Sox manager Terry Francona compared rookie Red Sox outfielder Ryan Kalish's intensity and aggressiveness to Nixon's.

In October 2018, Nixon threw out the ceremonial first pitch of the American League Division Series to Dustin Pedroia, and collected donations outside of Fenway Park for Hurricane Florence victims.

In 2020, Nixon was inducted into the North Carolina Sports Hall of Fame. He was inducted in the Red Sox Hall of Fame in May 2024.

== Personal life ==
Nixon became an evangelical Christian in 1993. Nixon said he relied on his faith as a calming influence on the field.

Nixon is married to his wife, Kathryn, with whom he has two sons, Chase (born September 11, 2001) and Luke (born October 1, 2004). Luke was drafted by the San Francisco Giants in the fifth round of the 2026 Major League Baseball draft. Nixon was flying back to Boston to be at Chase's birth when air traffic was halted due to the September 11 attacks on the United States.

== See also ==
- Dirt Dog
