= Doug Mirabelli =

American baseball player (born 1970)

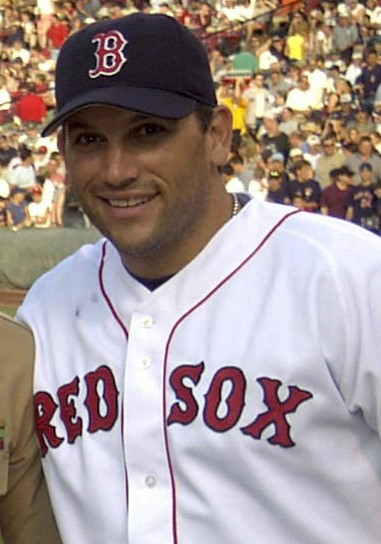
- Catcher
- Born: October 18, 1970 (age 55); Kingman, Arizona, U.S.
- Batted: Right Threw: Right

MLB debut
- August 27, 1996, for the San Francisco Giants

Last MLB appearance
- September 30, 2007, for the Boston Red Sox

MLB statistics
- Batting average: .231
- Home runs: 58
- Runs batted in: 206
- Stats at Baseball Reference

Teams
- San Francisco Giants (1996–2000); Texas Rangers (2001); Boston Red Sox (2001–2005); San Diego Padres (2006); Boston Red Sox (2006–2007)

Career highlights and awards
- 2× World Series champion (2004, 2007)

Douglas Anthony Mirabelli (born October 18, 1970) is an American former Major League Baseball catcher. He played for the San Francisco Giants (1996–2000), Texas Rangers (2001), Boston Red Sox (2001–2005), and San Diego Padres (2006) before returning to the Red Sox (2006–2007) to end his 11-year career. He batted and threw right-handed.

Mirabelli was a career .231 hitter with 58 home runs and 206 runs batted in in 566 games. While with the Red Sox, he was well-known as the personal catcher for knuckleballer Tim Wakefield. He was part of the Red Sox' World Series championship teams in 2004 and 2007.

== High school and college ==
After leading Valley High School in his hometown of Las Vegas to two state baseball titles, Mirabelli was originally selected by the Detroit Tigers in the sixth Round (159th overall) of the 1989 Major League Baseball amateur draft, but did not sign. Instead, Mirabelli chose to attend Wichita State University. In 1990, he played collegiate summer baseball in the Cape Cod Baseball League for the Hyannis Mets and was named a league all-star.

In 1992, Mirabelli was selected by the San Francisco Giants in the 5th round (131st overall) of the Major League Baseball amateur draft. He signed a contract with the club on June 24, 1992.

== Minor leagues ==
Mirabelli began his minor league career in 1992 with the San Jose Giants in the California League. Over the next four seasons, he also spent time with the Giants' Double-A club, the Shreveport Captains, and their Triple-A team, the Fresno Grizzlies .

In 1996, Mirabelli impressed starting in Double-A, hitting .295 with 21 home runs and 70 runs batted in, which earned a late season promotion to Triple-A. He bounced back to the Double-A level before earning a promotion to the major leagues in August of that year. Mirabelli made his major league debut on August 23, 1996, against the Philadelphia Phillies.

== Major Leagues ==
=== San Francisco Giants: 1996–2000 ===
In the late 1990s, the Giants teams often utilized a platoon at the catcher position, relying on different veterans to split time for most of the season. When Mirabelli reached the majors, he saw limited time and spent most of his season in Triple-A with Phoenix. In 1999, he finally made the promotion to the majors permanent when he split time with veterans Brent Mayne and Scott Servais.

The following season, Mirabelli platooned with Bobby Estalella, but neither catcher hit above .230 or played well enough to earn the starting job.

=== Texas Rangers: 2001 ===
During spring training of 2001, the Giants signed veteran catcher Benito Santiago, who took over the starting role. Mirabelli's contract was sold to the Texas Rangers, who made him the backup to All-Star catcher Iván Rodríguez. Mirabelli struggled, barely hitting above .100.

=== Boston Red Sox: 2001–2005 ===
After Boston Red Sox catcher Jason Varitek's season was ended by a broken left elbow on June 7, 2001, the Red Sox acquired Mirabelli on June 12 in a trade with the Texas Rangers. He split time with Scott Hatteberg for the rest of the season. Mirabelli hit .270 with 9 home runs for the Red Sox in 2001.

After the season, Hatteberg signed as a free agent with the Oakland Athletics and, in 2002, Mirabelli found himself as the designated catcher for veteran pitchers Darren Oliver and Frank Castillo. However, neither one lasted in the rotation. Mirabelli soon found himself partnered with knuckleballer Tim Wakefield. On July 23, 2002, Wakefield returned to the starting rotation, after serving as a reliever for most of the season; Mirabelli made the start at catcher. The partnership seemed to work as Wakefield went 8–2 down the stretch, with Mirabelli catching for him each time.

Over the next three seasons, Wakefield and Mirabelli became an effective battery. As Wakefield solidified himself in the starting rotation, Mirabelli made almost every start for him, as well as spot starts in relief of Varitek. Offensively, Mirabelli provided an occasional spark; he would become the only player in Major League Baseball history to hit six or more home runs in six consecutive seasons of fewer than 200 at-bats (from 2001 to 2006).

Mirabelli was the starting catcher in Game 1 of the 2004 World Series, as Wakefield was named the starting pitcher. He batted 1-for-3 with a run scored as the Red Sox went on to win 11–9, and eventually sweep the St. Louis Cardinals.

In 2005, Mirabelli hit .228 and struck out in more than a third of his at-bats. He also missed nearly a month due to a left wrist injury. Following the season, the Red Sox traded Mirabelli to the San Diego Padres for second baseman Mark Loretta.

=== San Diego Padres: 2006 ===
For the first time in his major league career, Mirabelli was going to be given a chance to be a starting catcher. However, in early February, General Manager Kevin Towers decided to sign veteran catcher Mike Piazza and installed him as the starter instead. Mirabelli made just a handful of starts, hitting .182 with no runs batted in through April. Upset over Piazza's arrival and his subsequent lack of playing time, Mirabelli asked Towers to work out a deal that would send him back to Boston.

=== Return to Boston: 2006–2007 ===
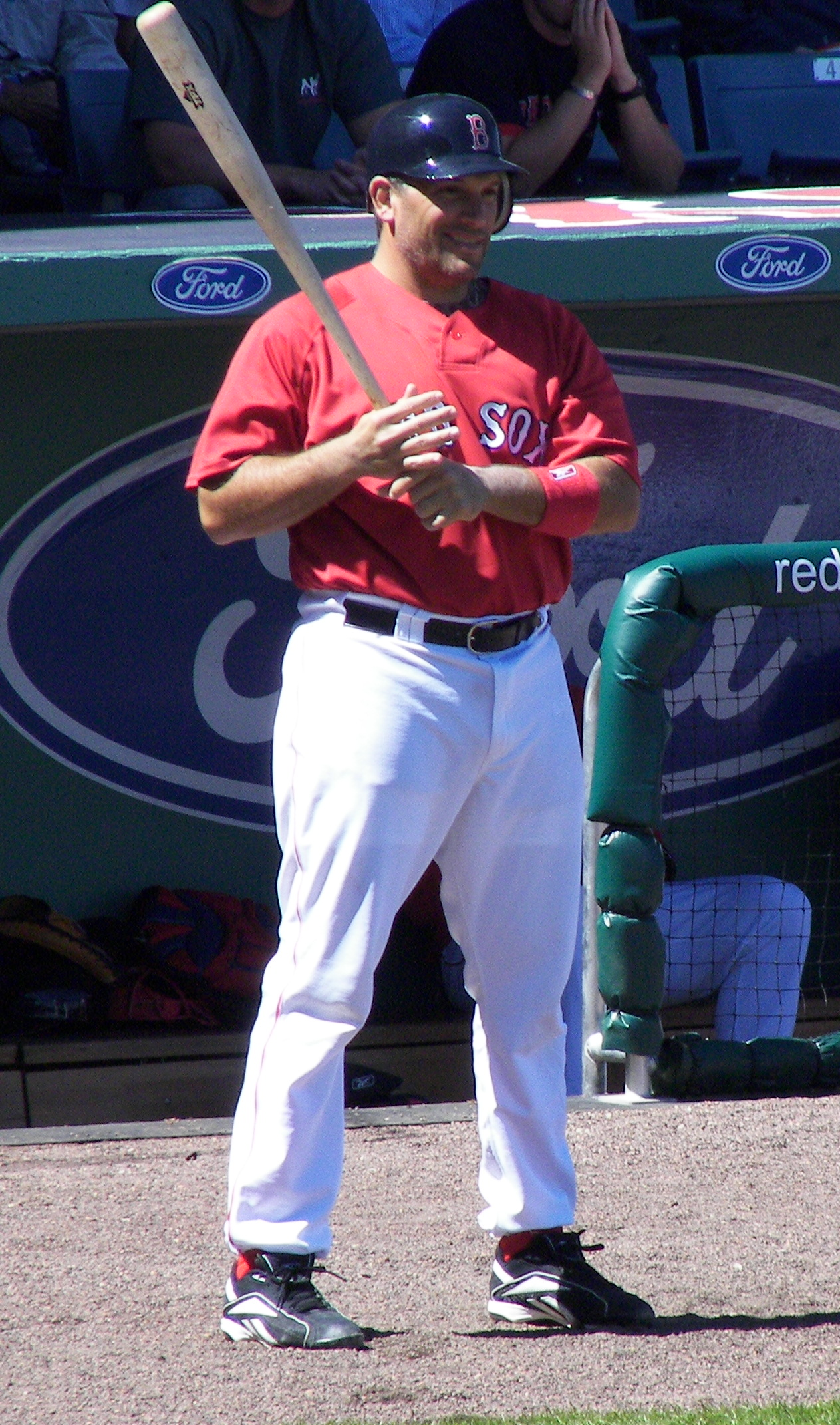
Mirabelli on-deck during 2007 spring training.

Mirabelli was reacquired by the Red Sox on May 1, 2006, in exchange for catcher Josh Bard, setup man Cla Meredith, and $100,000 cash. This reacquisition occurred because Bard had trouble catching Tim Wakefield's knuckleball, committing 10 passed balls in 7 games. The day the trade occurred, the Red Sox were to play their first game of the year against their rivals, the New York Yankees, at Fenway Park, and Wakefield was scheduled to start. It took a private jet and a Massachusetts State Police escort to get Mirabelli to the field in time. His plane from San Diego touched down at Logan Airport at 6:48 pm, he arrived at Fenway Park at 7:00 pm, and took his place behind the plate just in time for Wakefield's opening pitch at 7:13 pm. In an effort to conserve every second possible, the Red Sox sent a uniform along with the police escort for Mirabelli to change into while en route to Fenway Park from the airport. A special glove (which is actually a woman's softball catcher's mitt) which Mirabelli had used in previous years to catch Wakefield had been left in Boston by Josh Bard for Mirabelli. Soon after, the Yankees admitted they had tried to acquire Mirabelli from the Padres in an attempt to keep him from the Red Sox .

On April 25, 2007, while Boston was visiting the Baltimore Orioles in the teams' first match up of the season, a controversy arose when Orioles' play-by-play announcer Gary Thorne alleged during the fifth inning of his telecast that Mirabelli had told him years ago that Curt Schilling's bloody sock from the Red Sox's 2004 championship run was only a publicity stunt. "... That famous red stocking that he wore when they finally won, the blood on his stocking, nah. It was painted. Doug Mirabelli confessed up to it after. It was all for PR," said Thorne. Thorne's comments were first reported on The Joy of Sox, a Red Sox blog. Mirabelli initially vehemently denied talking about the incident to Thorne, and the comments by both individuals rekindled a controversy on a national level which had been dormant for years. Although Red Sox management refused to comment on the situation, Mirabelli faced the media the following day to try to quell a situation that had clearly gotten out of hand. While also making a point to affirm that the substance on Schilling's sock was undoubtedly his own blood, Mirabelli did acknowledge that there was likely a misunderstanding in a past dialogue with Thorne after the commentator had also admitted as much. Schilling's bloody sock now resides in the Baseball Hall of Fame.

Mirabelli hit under .200 for the rest of the season and battled an ankle injury late in the year; Wakefield pitched just over .500 before suffering an injury in July and missing almost two months. Mirabelli re-signed with the Red Sox for the 2007 season, but his offense did not improve as he hit .202 and once again battled various leg injuries late in the year.

In January 2008, Mirabelli agreed in principle to a one-year contract to return to the Red Sox for the 2008 season. The deal was reported to have a base salary of $550,000 with incentives. However, on March 13, 2008, Mirabelli was released by the Red Sox when the team elected to use Kevin Cash as its backup catcher.

== Coaching career ==
On January 5, 2009, Mirabelli was named the new head baseball coach at St. Francis High School in Traverse City, Michigan.

On September 9, 2015, Mirabelli was named Florida Gators softball volunteer assistant coach.

== Personal life ==
Mirabelli became an evangelical Christian in 1993.

Mirabelli and his wife Kristin have two daughters, Molly and Emma, and one son, Joseph. He graduated from Valley High School in Las Vegas, Nevada in 1989. As of March 2009, Mirabelli works as a realtor for Coldwell Banker Schmidt Realtors in Traverse City, Michigan.
