= Alan Embree =

American baseball player (born 1970)

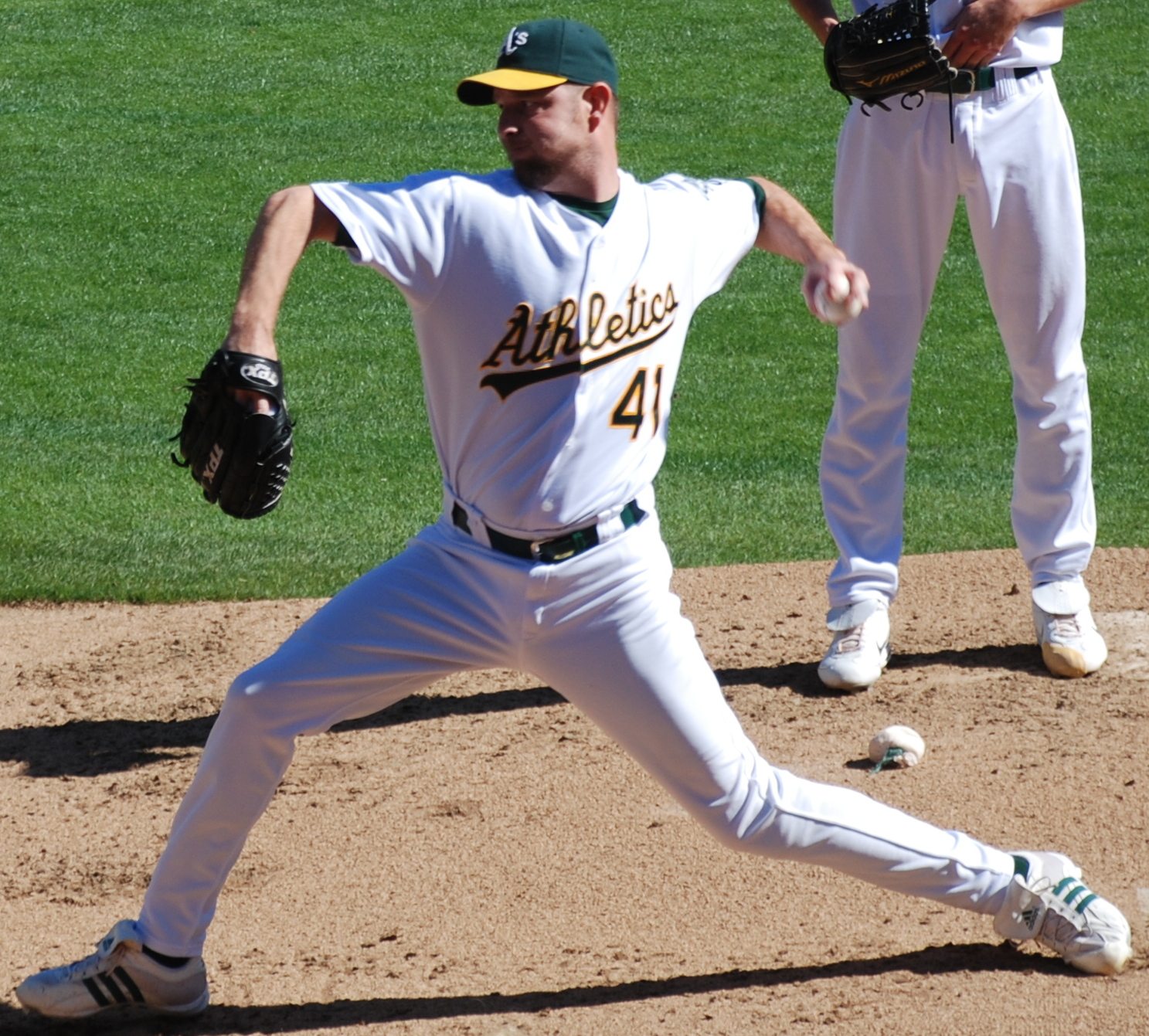
- Embree with the Oakland Athletics in 2007
- Pitcher
- Born: January 23, 1970 (age 55); The Dalles, Oregon, U.S.
- Batted: Left Threw: Left

MLB debut
- September 15, 1992, for the Cleveland Indians

Last MLB appearance
- July 10, 2009, for the Colorado Rockies

MLB statistics
- Win–loss record: 39–45
- Earned run average: 4.59
- Strikeouts: 691
- Stats at Baseball Reference

Teams
- Cleveland Indians (1992, 1995–1996); Atlanta Braves (1997–1998); Arizona Diamondbacks (1998); San Francisco Giants (1999–2001); Chicago White Sox (2001); San Diego Padres (2002); Boston Red Sox (2002–2005); New York Yankees (2005); San Diego Padres (2006); Oakland Athletics (2007–2008); Colorado Rockies (2009)

Career highlights and awards
- World Series champion (2004)

Alan Duane Embree (born January 23, 1970) is an American former Major League Baseball relief pitcher. Embree played for the Cleveland Indians (1992–1996), Atlanta Braves (1997–1998), Arizona Diamondbacks (1998), San Francisco Giants (1999–2001), Chicago White Sox (2001), San Diego Padres (2002 & 2006), Boston Red Sox (2002–2005), New York Yankees (2005), Oakland Athletics (2007–2008), and the Colorado Rockies (2009). He batted and threw left-handed, and was used as a left-handed specialist. He won the 2004 World Series with the Red Sox.

== High school ==
Embree won a state championship in baseball at Prairie High School. Due to a shoulder injury, he did not pitch during his senior season. Over the final three seasons of his high school career, he hit .400.

== Professional career ==
From 1992 through 2004, Embree had posted a 28–28 record with a 4.38 ERA and seven saves in 568 games.

In 2004, Embree recorded the final out against the New York Yankees in Game 7 of the 2004 ALCS, and shut down the Cardinals in the eighth inning of Game 4 of the 2004 World Series, and an inning later, the Red Sox won the World Series and Embree received his World Series ring on Opening Day, 2005.

In 2005, with the Boston Red Sox, Embree's record was 1–4 with a 7.65 ERA in 43 outings. As a result of these sub-par numbers, Embree was designated for assignment on July 19. He was signed by the New York Yankees on July 30 to replace Buddy Groom who was designated for assignment.

On December 6, 2006, it was announced that Embree agreed to a two-year deal with the Oakland Athletics including an option for the 2009 season. Embree spent the bulk of his time serving as the team's closer while Huston Street was injured for a prolonged period.

On December 13, 2008, it was announced that Embree had agreed to a one-year deal with the Colorado Rockies for the 2009 season and an option for the 2010 season.

On July 7, 2009, Embree became only the second pitcher since 1990 to be awarded a win without throwing a single pitch. This is because he was able to pick Austin Kearns of the Washington Nationals off at first base.

On July 10, 2009, Embree's right tibia was broken after he was struck in the leg by a line drive off the bat of the Atlanta Braves' Martín Prado. The injury required surgery and caused Embree to miss the rest of the 2009 season.

On March 20, 2010, the Boston Red Sox signed Embree to a Minor League contract with a Major League Spring Training invitation. Embree had a clause in his contract that would grant him a release by April 15, if he was not on the major league roster. He opted to remain with the Boston organization and was called up on April 28. However, he was designated for assignment on May 1 without appearing in a game.

On May 11, 2010, the Chicago White Sox signed Embree and assigned him to the Triple-A Charlotte Knights.

== Pitching style ==
Embree relied primarily on two pitches: a 90–95 MPH four-seam fastball and a sharp slider. In his younger days, Embree's fastball was clocked as high as 96–98 mph. During his time with the Red Sox, he began to throw his fastball at slightly lower velocity in order to avoid injuring his arm. He also refined his slider into an effective pitch, whereas before, he had relied almost exclusively on his blazing fastball.

== Post-playing career ==
On November 8, 2012, Embree was named the pitching coach for the Bend Elks Baseball Club in Bend, Oregon. The Bend Elks are an amateur baseball team from Bend, Oregon. The team is a founding member of the wooden-bat West Coast League, a collegiate summer baseball league in Oregon, Washington and British Columbia that began play in 2005. He resides in The Dalles, Oregon and Melbourne Aus with his wife Semira Embree.

In 2022, Embree was named the manager of the Cowlitz Black Bears, also a West Coast League team. In 2023, Embree was named pitching coach of the Springfield Drifters, also a West Coast League team. The 2023–2024 season is also his first as the pitching coach for the Bushnell University (NAIA) baseball team located in Eugene, Oregon.
