= 2004 American League Championship Series =

35th edition of Major League Baseball's American League Championship Series

Team (Wins)	Managers	Season
Boston Red Sox (4)	Terry Francona	98–64 (.605), GB: 3
New York Yankees (3)	Joe Torre	101–61 (.623), GA: 3
- Dates: October 12–20
- MVP: David Ortiz (Boston)
- Umpires: Randy Marsh, Jeff Nelson, John Hirschbeck, Jim Joyce, Jeff Kellogg, Joe West

Broadcast
- Television: Fox (United States); MLB International (International)
- TV announcers: Joe Buck, Tim McCarver, Al Leiter, and Kenny Albert (Fox); Dave O'Brien and Rick Sutcliffe (MLB International)
- Radio: ESPN
- Radio announcers: Jon Miller and Joe Morgan
- ALDS: New York Yankees over Minnesota Twins (3–1); Boston Red Sox over Anaheim Angels (3–0)

The 2004 American League Championship Series was a best-of-seven playoff series in Major League Baseball's 2004 postseason pitting the defending American League champion and overall #1 seed New York Yankees against the fourth-seeded Boston Red Sox for the American League pennant. The Series began on October 12 and ended on October 20. The Yankees held home-field advantage by virtue of having a better regular season record.

The Red Sox became the first, and to date, only team in MLB history to come back from a 3–0 series deficit and ultimately win a best-of-seven series. The 2004 ALCS and the subsequent World Series has often been described as the "greatest comeback in sports history".

In Game 1, Yankees pitcher Mike Mussina pitched a perfect game through six innings, while the Red Sox recovered from an eight-run deficit to close within one run before the Yankees eventually won. A home run by John Olerud, which turned out to be the game-winner, lifted the Yankees in Game 2. The Yankees gathered 22 hits in Game 3 on their way to a blowout win. The Yankees led Game 4 by one run in the ninth inning, but a steal of second base by Red Sox base runner Dave Roberts and a single by Bill Mueller off Yankees closer Mariano Rivera tied the game. David Ortiz hit a home run in extra innings for the Red Sox win. In Game 5, the Red Sox overcame an eighth inning deficit, and Ortiz hit a 14th inning walk-off single for the Red Sox for their second consecutive extra-innings victory. Curt Schilling pitched seven innings in Game 6 for the Red Sox, during which time his right foot sock became soaked in blood due to an outstanding ankle injury. Game 7 featured the Red Sox paying back New York for their Game 3 blowout with a dominant performance on the road, anchored by Derek Lowe and bolstered by two Johnny Damon home runs including a grand slam. David Ortiz was named the Most Valuable Player of the series.

The Red Sox went on to sweep the St. Louis Cardinals in the World Series, winning their first World Series championship in 86 years and ending the Curse of the Bambino. The series ended up becoming the ESPN film "Four Days In October".

== Route to the series ==
=== Boston Red Sox ===
The Red Sox ended their 2003 season in the previous American League Championship Series with a game seven loss to the Yankees, on a walk-off home run by Yankees third baseman Aaron Boone in the bottom of the 11th inning. During the offseason, they traded Casey Fossum, Brandon Lyon, Jorge de la Rosa, and a minor leaguer to the Arizona Diamondbacks for ace starting pitcher Curt Schilling. Manager Grady Little was also fired and replaced with Terry Francona due to poor decisions that Little made during the previous season's playoffs. The Red Sox also signed a closing pitcher, Keith Foulke, to a three-year contract.

Going into the all-star break, the Red Sox were seven games behind the Yankees for the division lead with a record of 48–38, but led the wild card. In an attempt to improve the team and solidify a playoff decision and in anticipation for a showdown against the New York Yankees, general manager Theo Epstein traded well-liked shortstop Nomar Garciaparra to the Chicago Cubs in exchange for first baseman Doug Mientkiewicz and shortstop Orlando Cabrera in a four-team deal on the trading deadline (July 31). The team fell behind up to 10 1/2 games in the division during the month of August, but managed to come back in September to within two games. However, the Yankees held strong and won the division, finishing three games ahead of the Red Sox. The Red Sox won the AL Wild Card (the best record among three second-place teams) to obtain a spot in the playoffs. Entering the postseason, first baseman Kevin Millar was asked to compare the team with the previous season's team, to which he responded, "I'm pretty sure we're five outs better than last year." It was a reference to the 2003 American League Championship Series, in which the Red Sox held a 5–2 lead over the Yankees with one out in the eighth inning of Game 7, only to blow the lead and lose the series.

The Red Sox would sweep the Anaheim Angels in three games, but at a cost. In the first game of the series, Schilling would be hurt by a line drive hit off his foot, leaving the rest of his postseason play in doubt.

=== New York Yankees ===
The 2004 Yankees began the season in Tokyo with a split against the Devil Rays. Playing a much-anticipated game against the Red Sox, the team lost the game 6–2 and 6 out of the first 7 games to their rivals. After falling as many as 4 1/2 games behind the Red Sox on April 25, the team would make up the deficit in less than 2 weeks, including an 8-game win streak. By the end of June, they had a commanding 8 1/2 game lead in the AL East over the Red Sox after sweeping them with a dramatic 5–4 walk-off 13-inning victory. After the All-Star break, the Yankees traded José Contreras to the Chicago White Sox for Esteban Loaiza. Contreras was signed away from the Red Sox before the 2003 season, but he failed to live up to expectations. With a 10 1/2 game lead in the second week of August, the team struggled and watched their lead dwindle to only 2 1/2 games on September 3. The team held off the Red Sox to claim the division and set up a playoff rematch with the Twins. The results were pretty much the same, as the Yankees took the Division Series in 4 games, setting up the rematch.

== Series build-up ==
The Red Sox and Yankees had met 45 times in the previous two years, with Boston holding a 23–22 lead. The Red Sox held an 11–8 advantage over New York in 2004, but eight of the games were decided in one of the teams' final at-bats. Boston outscored New York, 106–105. and this was the fifth time that the two teams were on the doorstep of a World Series, with the Yankees winning the previous four, in 1949, 1978, 1999, and 2003.

The Series was widely anticipated, especially given the outcome of the previous October, when the Yankees beat the Red Sox in seven games when Aaron Boone hit a home run off of Tim Wakefield in the bottom of the 11th inning to send the Yankees to the World Series. Yankees General Manager Brian Cashman said that "the two teams in the American League facing each other in this series are the two best teams, period." Fox commentator Joe Buck said as the series began: "Well, it's hard to believe, it was almost exactly one year ago tonight that Aaron Boone hit that 11th inning home run to beat the Red Sox...yet for some reason it seemed predetermined that we would be right back here a year later for a rematch of sort."

Dan Shaughnessy of The Boston Globe wrote that "one year after they (Yankees) jousted to the (Sox's) finish in the Bronx last October in an epic seventh game that appeared to take the clash to its zenith they go at it again..." In this series, Alex Rodriguez seemed to answer the Sox' acquisition of Curt Schilling, as the two veteran stars faced each other, "wearing the uniforms of the ancient rivals in an October game..." Yankees pitcher Mike Mussina summed up the build-up: "This is what everyone was hoping for...It's a rematch of last year, with the best two teams in the American League."

The New York Times said that this was the showdown the Yankees anticipated the entire season, while the Red Sox craved it an entire year. This was the reason why the Red Sox fired Grady Little, traded Nomar Garciaparra, and added Curt Schilling. Outfielder Johnny Damon said of Boone's home run: "If we do advance to the World Series and win, it's a better story that we went through New York. We needed to get back here. This is where a lot of hearts were broken, and we're in a perfect seat to stop the hurting." The Red Sox' Theo Epstein agreed, saying "Now that it's here, we can admit that if we're able to win a World Series and go through New York along the way, it will mean that much more."

Initially, Game 4 was scheduled for the afternoon. However, MLB Commissioner Bud Selig had moved the starting time of Game 4 to primetime, due to the rematch, and Fox had a triple-header, first the Seattle Seahawks–New England Patriots game at Gillette Stadium at 1:00 pm ET, then Game 4 of the NLCS between the St. Louis Cardinals and Houston Astros at Minute Maid Park at 4:30 pm ET.

== Summary ==
=== New York Yankees vs. Boston Red Sox ===
Boston won the series, 4–3.

Game	Date	Score	Location	Time	Attendance
1	October 12	Boston Red Sox – 7, New York Yankees – 10	Yankee Stadium (I)	3:20	56,135
2	October 13	Boston Red Sox – 1, New York Yankees – 3	Yankee Stadium (I)	3:15	56,136
3	October 16	New York Yankees – 19, Boston Red Sox – 8	Fenway Park	4:20	35,126
4	October 17	New York Yankees – 4, Boston Red Sox – 6 (12)	Fenway Park	5:02	34,826
5	October 18	New York Yankees – 4, Boston Red Sox – 5 (14)	Fenway Park	5:49	35,120
6	October 19	Boston Red Sox – 4, New York Yankees – 2	Yankee Stadium (I)	3:50	56,128
7	October 20	Boston Red Sox – 10, New York Yankees – 3	Yankee Stadium (I)	3:31	56,129

== Game summaries ==
=== Game 1 ===
October 12, 2004 8:20 pm (EDT) at Yankee Stadium in Bronx, New York 60 °F (16 °C), Mostly clear
Team	1	2	3	4	5	6	7	8	9	R	H	E
Boston	0	0	0	0	0	0	5	2	0	7	10	0
New York	2	0	4	0	0	2	0	2	X	10	14	0
WP: Mike Mussina (1–0) LP: Curt Schilling (0–1) Sv: Mariano Rivera (1); Home runs: BOS: Jason Varitek (1); NYY: Kenny Lofton (1); Attendance: 56,135; Boxscore

Game 1 pitted the Red Sox's star pitcher Curt Schilling against Yankees ace Mike Mussina. Schilling entered the game with a 6–1 postseason career record, but the expected pitchers' duel quickly became a one-sided exhibition. Schilling had sustained a torn tendon sheath in his right ankle during Game 1 of the American League Division Series against the Angels, and proved to be ineffective. In the first, Gary Sheffield doubled with two outs before Hideki Matsui drove him in with a double, then Matsui scored on Bernie Williams's single. In the third, the Yankees loaded the bases with no outs on two singles and a walk before Matsui cleared them with a double. After moving to third on a groundout, Matsui scored on Jorge Posada's sacrifice fly. In the sixth, Kenny Lofton hit a leadoff home run off of knuckleballer Tim Wakefield. Sheffield doubled with two outs before scoring on a single by Matsui, giving him an ALCS record-tying five RBIs in the game.

Mussina, meanwhile, retired the game's first 19 Red Sox batters. Mark Bellhorn ended Mussina's bid for a perfect game with a one-out double in the seventh. After David Ortiz singled with two outs, Kevin Millar's double to left scored two runs. Millar moved to third on a passed ball before scoring on Trot Nixon's single. Tanyon Sturtze relieved Mussina and akllowed a home run to Jason Varitek that made it 8–5 Yankees. Next inning, Tom Gordon allowed singles to Bill Mueller and Manny Ramirez before Ortiz's two-out triple cut the Yankees lead to 8–7. The Yankees called upon closer Mariano Rivera, who induced a pop out by Kevin Millar to end the inning. In the bottom half, Alex Rodriguez and Sheffield singled off of Mike Timlin before Williams' two-run double made it 10–7 Yankees. The Sox hit two singles in the top of the ninth inning off of Rivera, but the game ended when Bill Mueller grounded into a double play.

=== Game 2 ===
October 13, 2004 8:19 pm (EDT) at Yankee Stadium in Bronx, New York 62 °F (17 °C), Overcast
Team	1	2	3	4	5	6	7	8	9	R	H	E
Boston	0	0	0	0	0	0	0	1	0	1	5	0
New York	1	0	0	0	0	2	0	0	X	3	7	0
WP: Jon Lieber (1–0) LP: Pedro Martínez (0–1) Sv: Mariano Rivera (2); Home runs: BOS: None; NYY: John Olerud (1); Attendance: 56,136; Boxscore

Game 2 featured Pedro Martínez of the Red Sox facing Yankees pitcher Jon Lieber. Again, the Yankees struck first, as Gary Sheffield drove in Derek Jeter, who walked, in the first inning. The 1–0 score held up for several innings, as Lieber and Martinez put together a classic pitchers' duel.

Martinez got himself in and out of trouble through several innings, but, shortly after making his 100th pitch of the night, walked Jorge Posada and allowed a John Olerud home run, giving New York a 3–0 lead.

Again, the Red Sox rallied. Trot Nixon singled to lead off the eighth off of Lieber, who was replaced by Tom Gordon. A double by Jason Varitek moved Nixon to third before Orlando Cabrera's RBI groundout closed the gap, 3–1. With two outs and a runner on third, however, the Yankees again turned to Rivera, who struck out Johnny Damon to end the inning. Rivera shut down the Red Sox in the ninth by inducing a groundout by Mark Bellhorn, and, after giving up a double to Manny Ramírez, striking out David Ortiz and Millar, ending the game.

=== Game 3 ===
October 16, 2004 8:10 pm (EDT) at Fenway Park in Boston, Massachusetts 57 °F (14 °C), Overcast
Team	1	2	3	4	5	6	7	8	9	R	H	E
New York	3	0	3	5	2	0	4	0	2	19	22	1
Boston	0	4	2	0	0	0	2	0	0	8	15	0
WP: Javier Vázquez (1–0) LP: Ramiro Mendoza (0–1); Home runs: NYY: Hideki Matsui (2), Alex Rodriguez (1), Gary Sheffield (1); BOS: Trot Nixon (1), Jason Varitek (2); Attendance: 35,126; Boxscore

With the series moving to Fenway Park, Game 3 was originally scheduled for October 15, but was postponed a day due to rain. The starting pitchers were Kevin Brown for the Yankees and Bronson Arroyo for the Red Sox.

As in the first two games, the Yankees began by scoring in the first. Derek Jeter walked and scored from first on a double by Alex Rodríguez. Two batters later, Hideki Matsui hit a home run to right field, giving the Yankees a 3–0 lead. The Red Sox answered in the second inning with a leadoff walk by Jason Varitek and a Trot Nixon home run to right field. A double by Bill Mueller, an infield RBI hit by Johnny Damon (his first hit of the series), and a Derek Jeter error led to two more runs. The Red Sox led for the first time in the series, 4–3.

This lead was short-lived, as Alex Rodríguez led off the third inning with a home run over the Green Monster. Gary Sheffield then walked and Hideki Matsui doubled, prompting Bronson Arroyo to be replaced on the mound by Ramiro Mendoza, who immediately allowed a Bernie Williams RBI single and then balked, allowing Matsui to score from third, which gave the Yankees a 6–4 lead. The Red Sox, however, responded in the bottom of the inning, scoring two runs on an Orlando Cabrera bases-loaded double off Yankees reliever Javier Vázquez to tie the game.

In the fourth inning, the Yankees took the lead on a three-run home run to left by Gary Sheffield after a walk and hit-by-pitch. After another double by Hideki Matsui, the Red Sox put in pitcher Tim Wakefield, who volunteered to forgo his scheduled Game 4 start in order to preserve Boston's battered bullpen. Wakefield got Bernie Williams to pop out and then intentionally walked Jorge Posada. Rubén Sierra then tripled to score Matsui and Posada, giving the Yankees an 11–6 lead.

From that point on the Yankees were in total control, with the New York offense continuing to hit and score runs long into the night. In the fifth, Jeter walked with one-out before back-to-back RBI doubles by Rodriguez and Sheffield made it 13–6 Yankees. In the seventh, Miguel Cairo and Sheffield singled off of Wakefield, who was relieved by Alan Embree. Matsui's single scored a run, Williams's double scored two, and Jorge Posada's double scored another. The Red Sox scored their last runs of the game in the bottom of the inning off of Vazquez on Jason Varitek's two-run home run after a leadoff single. Matsui also hit a two-run home run in the ninth off of Mike Myers.

When the game was over, the Yankees had set a team record for postseason runs scored. Rodríguez, Sheffield, and Matsui had prolific hitting nights. Matsui had five hits and five RBIs, tying LCS records. He and Rodríguez both tied the postseason record for runs scored with five. The two teams combined for 37 hits and 20 extra-base hits, both postseason records. At four hours and 20 minutes, the contest was the longest nine-inning postseason game ever played up to that time.

Although the final score was 19–8, Dan Shaughnessy of The Boston Globe said "nineteen to eight. Why not '19–18'?" He was referring to the Red Sox not having won a World Series since 1918, and demeaning chants of that year echoed at Yankee Stadium.

Bob Ryan wrote about the Red Sox in The Boston Globe: "They are down, 3–0, after last night's 19–8 rout, and, in this sport, that is an official death sentence. Soon it will be over, and we will spend another dreary winter lamenting this and lamenting that."

=== Game 4 ===
October 17, 2004 8:20 pm (EDT) at Fenway Park in Boston, Massachusetts 51 °F (11 °C), Partly Cloudy
Team	1	2	3	4	5	6	7	8	9	10	11	12	R	H	E
New York	0	0	2	0	0	2	0	0	0	0	0	0	4	12	1
Boston	0	0	0	0	3	0	0	0	1	0	0	2	6	8	0
WP: Curtis Leskanic (1–0) LP: Paul Quantrill (0–1); Home runs: NYY: Alex Rodriguez (2); BOS: David Ortiz (1); Attendance: 34,826; Boxscore

Game 4 featured Yankees pitcher Orlando Hernández, the 1999 ALCS MVP against Boston's Derek Lowe. For the first time in the series, the Yankees did not score in the first inning. However, they eventually did score first. With two outs and nobody on in the third inning, Derek Jeter singled. Alex Rodríguez then hit a two-run home run over the Green Monster. This hit resembled a home run he hit in Game 3, as it also came in the third inning and went out of the park onto Lansdowne Street. This would be followed by the ball being thrown back into the outfield by fans on the Street, Johnny Damon tossing the ball back over the fence, and the ball once again being tossed back before being pocketed by Umpire Joe West.

Hernández, who had not pitched in two weeks, cruised through the first four innings giving up just one hit and two walks. In the fifth inning, he pitched himself into a jam, walking two of the first three batters. With two men on and two out, Orlando Cabrera singled to right field, scoring Bill Mueller. Manny Ramírez walked to load the bases, and then David Ortiz hit a single to center field, scoring Cabrera and Johnny Damon and giving the Red Sox a 3–2 lead, only their second lead in the series.

The lead lasted less than an inning. Hideki Matsui hit a triple with one out in the sixth, after which Mike Timlin relieved Lowe. Bernie Williams hit an infield single to score Matsui and tie the game 3-3. After Jorge Posada walked, Williams attempted to advance to third on a passed ball but was thrown out by Jason Varitek. However, Rubén Sierra hit another infield single, moving Posada to third. Tony Clark then hit the third infield single of the inning, to score Posada and give the Yankees a 4–3 lead. Miguel Cairo then walked to load the bases for Jeter, but Timlin induced a groundout to escape the inning.

Massachusetts native Tanyon Sturtze pitched two scoreless innings in relief of Hernández. Mariano Rivera, the Yankees star closer, entered the game in the eighth for a two-inning save attempt. In the ninth inning, Rivera allowed a lead-off walk to Kevin Millar, which ultimately turned out to be the turning point of the series. Dave Roberts was then chosen to pinch-run for Millar. With the Red Sox down to their final three outs, Rivera checked Roberts at first base three times before throwing a pitch to Bill Mueller.

On Rivera's first pitch to Mueller, the speedy Roberts stole second, putting himself in scoring position. Mueller's single (through Rivera and into centerfield) allowed Roberts to score, resulting in Rivera blowing the save. The Red Sox further threatened when a groundout advanced Mueller to 2nd and Johnny Damon reached on a fielding error by Yankee first baseman Tony Clark, but Rivera struck out Orlando Cabrera and David Ortiz popped out, resulting in the game going into extra innings tied at four runs apiece.

Both teams threatened for more runs in the 11th inning, but the game remained tied until the bottom of the 12th. Ramírez led off with a single against new pitcher Paul Quantrill, who had relieved Tom Gordon, and Ortiz hit a two-run walk-off home run to right field. Ortiz became the first player with two walk-off homers in the same postseason; his first capped a Red Sox sweep of the Anaheim Angels in the American League Division Series. Red Sox pitcher Curtis Leskanic got the win in relief after being called on to stop the Yankees' 11th inning threat and had pitched the 12th and allowed no runs.

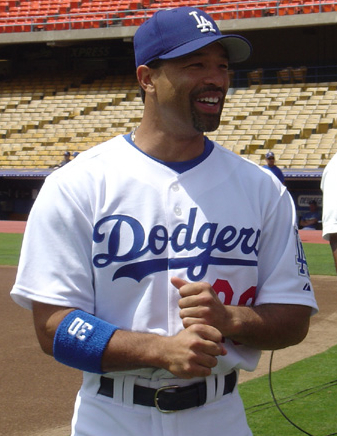
Dave Roberts, pictured here in 2004 before his trade to the Red Sox, whose stolen base in game 4 was vital for keeping the Red Sox in the playoffs.

=== Game 5 ===
October 18, 2004 5:11 pm (EDT) Fenway Park in Boston, Massachusetts 55 °F (13 °C), Partly Cloudy
Team	1	2	3	4	5	6	7	8	9	10	11	12	13	14	R	H	E
New York	0	1	0	0	0	3	0	0	0	0	0	0	0	0	4	12	1
Boston	2	0	0	0	0	0	0	2	0	0	0	0	0	1	5	13	1
WP: Tim Wakefield (1–0) LP: Esteban Loaiza (0–1); Home runs: NYY: Bernie Williams (1); BOS: David Ortiz (2); Attendance: 35,120; Boxscore

Game 5 began at 5:11 pm EDT on Monday, October 18, just 16 hours after Game 4 had ended. Mike Mussina led the Yankees against Boston's Pedro Martínez. The Red Sox drew first blood this time, as David Ortiz drove in a run with an RBI single after two one-out singles and Jason Varitek walked with the bases loaded in the first inning to give Boston a 2–0 lead. Bernie Williams homered in the second inning to close the gap to 2–1, a score which would hold up for several innings.

Despite seven strikeouts by Martínez, in the top of the sixth inning, Jorge Posada and Rubén Sierra singled with one out. After Miguel Cairo was hit by a pitch to load the bases, Derek Jeter cleared the bases with a double, giving the Yankees a 4–2 lead. The Red Sox threatened again in the seventh inning but came up empty. For the second straight night, however, the Yankee bullpen could not keep the lead. Ortiz led off the eighth inning with a home run off former Red Sox reliever Tom Gordon, making it a one-run game. Kevin Millar followed with a walk and was again replaced by pinch runner Dave Roberts, who went to third on Trot Nixon's single. Gordon was replaced by Mariano Rivera with the lead still intact, but Jason Varitek's sacrifice fly tied the game. The Yankees threatened in the top of the ninth when former Red Sox player Tony Clark hit a ball to deep right with two outs, but the ball took a hop over the short right-field wall for a ground-rule double, forcing Rubén Sierra to stop at third base, where he was stranded to set up another extra-inning marathon.

Each team got its share of base runners in extra innings. Boston's Doug Mientkiewicz hit a ground rule double in the tenth with one out off Yankee reliever Félix Heredia and moved to third on a Gabe Kapler groundout, but Yankee reliever Paul Quantrill stranded him there. Bill Mueller and Mark Bellhorn of the Red Sox led off the 11th with singles off Quantrill, but Esteban Loaiza, who had struggled since being acquired by the Yankees mid-season, came in to pitch with one out and got Orlando Cabrera to ground into a double play. Knuckleballer Tim Wakefield came on in relief once again for the Red Sox in the 12th. He allowed a single to Miguel Cairo, who went to second on a Manny Ramírez error, but Cairo was eventually stranded. In the top of the 13th, Red Sox catcher Jason Varitek, who did not normally catch for Wakefield (backup catcher Doug Mirabelli usually did) and who admitted to being poor at catching knuckleballs, allowed three passed balls, but the Yankees stranded runners on second and third when Sierra struck out. Loaiza pitched well over his first two innings, but, in the bottom of the 14th, Damon and Ramírez walked, bringing up Ortiz with two outs. The previous night's hero did his job again, singling to center on the 10th pitch of the at-bat to bring home Damon and setting off another celebration at Fenway. Ortiz's heroics prompted Fox TV announcer Tim McCarver to gush shortly afterwards, saying, "He didn't do it again, did he? Yes he did." The late inning heroics of Ortiz also gave the Red Sox fans a chance to create their own chant, "Who's your Papi?" (Ortiz being known affectionately as "Big Papi"), in rebuttal to the "Who's your daddy?" chant used by Yankees fans in reference to a quote by Pedro Martínez.

The game set the record for longest duration of a postseason game at 5 hours, 49 minutes, a record which was broken the next year by Game 4 of the 2005 National League Division Series between the Houston Astros and Atlanta Braves, which was only one minute longer even though it was 18 innings instead of 14. The current record for longest postseason game is Game 3 of the 2018 World Series between the Red Sox and Los Angeles Dodgers, which was also 18 innings but lasted seven hours and 20 minutes.

Game 5 of the National League Championship Series began at 8:54 pm EST on the same night and was intended to be the second part of FOX's two-game telecast. However, that game proceeded quickly and, despite starting 3 hours and 43 minutes after ALCS Game 5, ended only 24 minutes after the final pitch of this game.

This victory by the Red Sox forced a Game 6. Before this, the 1998 Atlanta Braves and 1999 New York Mets were the only baseball teams ever to be down 0–3 in a seven-game series and force a Game 6, but neither of those teams won that game.

The 8th inning of Game 5 eventually turned out be the last time that the Red Sox would trail at any point during a game in their 2004 postseason run.

=== Game 6 ===
October 19, 2004 8:19 pm (EDT) at Yankee Stadium in Bronx, New York 51 °F (11 °C), drizzle
Team	1	2	3	4	5	6	7	8	9	R	H	E
Boston	0	0	0	4	0	0	0	0	0	4	11	0
New York	0	0	0	0	0	0	1	1	0	2	6	0
WP: Curt Schilling (1–1) LP: Jon Lieber (1–1) Sv: Keith Foulke (1); Home runs: BOS: Mark Bellhorn (1); NYY: Bernie Williams (2); Attendance: 56,128; Boxscore

Game 6 was held on Tuesday, October 19 at Yankee Stadium. The starting pitchers were Curt Schilling of the Red Sox and Jon Lieber of the Yankees. Schilling pitched with a torn tendon sheath in his right ankle, which was sutured in place in an unprecedented procedure by Red Sox team doctors. The teams played the first few innings scoreless as cold, windy conditions, combined with a light drizzle, kept many hard hit balls in the field of play. Lieber, who had been brilliant in Game 2, was the first of the starters to falter, to the surprise of many given Lieber's Game 2 outing and Schilling's injured state. Lieber surrendered a two-out single to Jason Varitek, driving in Kevin Millar. Then Orlando Cabrera singled to left field and Mark Bellhorn, who had struggled the entire series, drove a line drive into the left field stands. The ball struck a fan in the hands in an attempted catch and dropped back onto the field, after which left field umpire Jim Joyce signaled the ball to be still in play, prompting Boston manager Terry Francona to run onto the field and argue the ruling. The officiating crew huddled and ultimately overruled the call. Bellhorn had a three-run home run, and the Red Sox had a 4–0 lead. Schilling, still injured from the ALDS and Game 1, pitched seven strong innings, allowing only one run on a Bernie Williams home run. To help stabilize the tendon in his ankle, Red Sox doctors had placed three sutures connecting the skin with ligament and deep connective tissue next to the bone, effectively creating a wall of tissue to keep the peroneal tendon from disrupting Schilling's pitching mechanics. Schilling was only forced to field his position once and visibly limped to first base to field the toss from Millar. Nonetheless, the Yankees did not bunt for the duration of Schilling's outing, something Joe Torre later explained as not playing out of the normal character of his team. Torre also admitted that had he known beforehand how bad the injury really was, it might have changed his mind. By the end of his performance, Schilling's white sanitary sock was partially soaked in blood, and he stated later that he was completely exhausted.

Bronson Arroyo took the mound for Boston in the eighth and, with one out, allowed a Miguel Cairo double. Derek Jeter singled him in to close the gap to 4–2, leading up to the series' most controversial play. Alex Rodriguez grounded a ball to Arroyo, who picked up the ball and ran to the baseline to tag Rodriguez out, but Rodriguez slapped Arroyo's arm, knocking the ball loose. While the ball rolled down the baseline, Rodríguez went to second and Jeter scored. After another long conversation among the umpires, Rodríguez was called out for interference and Jeter was ordered back to first, thus wiping out the score. The call further incensed the Yankee fans, already irate over the home run call in the fourth. As Torre and Rodríguez continued to frenetically argue with the umpires, many fans began to throw balls and other debris onto the field. Boston manager Terry Francona pulled his players from the field to protect them. After a delay, order was restored, and Arroyo got out of the inning unscathed. In the top of the ninth, after a leadoff single by Jason Varitek off Paul Quantrill, his third hit of the night, the Yankees attempted to turn a double play. However, on a very close play, Orlando Cabrera was called safe at first base. This was the third time in the game that the frustrated New York fan base had a close call go against their team, and they again showered the field with debris. As the Yankees made a pitching change to insert Tanyon Sturtze into the game to relieve Quantrill, home plate umpire Joe West conversed with New York City mayor Michael Bloomberg, MLB security director Kevin Hallinan, and various NYPD officials. Shortly after this, Sturtze was told to stop his warmup, and NYPD officers began streaming out of the dugouts, and took the field in full riot gear. The police remained on the field, near the first and third base walls, for the remainder of the top of the ninth. When the game resumed, Sturtze did get out of the inning, stranding Cabrera. The police vacated the field during the break between innings. Red Sox closer Keith Foulke came in for the bottom of the ninth and allowed a walk to Matsui, striking out Bernie Williams, getting Jorge Posada to pop out to third, and walking Ruben Sierra, bringing Tony Clark to the plate as the potential pennant-winning run, but Clark struck out swinging on a full count to end the game.

Five previous teams had managed to win one game after going down 3–0 in a post-season series. Of these five, two made it to a Game 6. But now the Red Sox, the 26th team in Major League Baseball playoff history to face a 3–0 series deficit, became the first to force a Game Seven.

After the game, Schilling proudly wore his shirt with the Red Sox's motto, "Why Not Us?" in the locker room and during the press conferences.

=== Game 7 ===
October 20, 2004 8:30 pm (EDT) at Yankee Stadium in Bronx, New York 54 °F (12 °C), Overcast
Team	1	2	3	4	5	6	7	8	9	R	H	E
Boston	2	4	0	2	0	0	0	1	1	10	13	0
New York	0	0	1	0	0	0	2	0	0	3	5	1
WP: Derek Lowe (1–0) LP: Kevin Brown (0–1); Home runs: BOS: David Ortiz (3), Johnny Damon (2), Mark Bellhorn (2); NYY: None; Attendance: 56,129; Boxscore

For inspiration for their ALCS comeback, the Red Sox gathered in Yankee Stadium's visitors' clubhouse prior to Game 7 to watch Miracle, the movie chronicling the 1980 U.S. men's gold-medal hockey team. The Yankees meanwhile, had Bucky Dent, the hero of the Yankees' one-game playoff against Boston in 1978, throw out the ceremonial first pitch.

Game 7 began at 8:30 p.m. The starting pitchers were Derek Lowe for the Red Sox and Kevin Brown for the Yankees. Johnny Damon led off the game with a single to left and stolen base, but was thrown out at home trying to score on a Manny Ramirez base hit. The very next pitch, however, was lined into the right-field bleachers by David Ortiz to give Boston a 2–0 advantage. After the Yankees went down in order in the first inning, Brown retired Trot Nixon on a groundout to begin the top of the second, but Kevin Millar singled to center field before Brown walked Bill Mueller and Orlando Cabrera to load the bases. Torre then replaced Brown with Javier Vázquez to face Johnny Damon, who hammered his first pitch into the right-field seats for a grand slam to make the score 6–0 Boston. Lowe, meanwhile, on two days rest, pitched six innings, allowing only one run on one hit when Miguel Cairo was hit by a pitch in the third, stole second, and scored on Derek Jeter's single. Vazquez walked Cabrera to lead off the fourth before Damon again homered on his first pitch to make it 8–1 Boston and give him three hits and six RBIs in this game. After walking two batters, Vazquez was relieved by Esteban Loaiza, who allowed a single to Jason Varitek to load the bases before retiring Trot Nixon and Kevin Millar to end the inning. Loaiza then threw three shutout innings, allowing three hits.

Pedro Martínez relieved Lowe in the seventh inning, receiving loud chants of "Who's Your Daddy?," which intensified as he gave up a leadoff double to Hideki Matsui, who scored on Bernie Williams's double. After Jorge Posada grounded out, Williams scored on Kenny Lofton's single, but John Olerud struck out and Cairo flew out to end the inning. In the eighth, Mark Bellhorn homered for the second night in a row off of Tom Gordon to make it 9–3 Boston. Next inning, Nixon hit a leadoff single, advanced to second on a Doug Mientkiewicz single, then went to third on a Mueller fly out before scoring on a sacrifice fly by Cabrera. Mariano Rivera relieved Gordon and retired Damon to end the inning.

Mike Timlin pitched a scoreless eighth and started the 9th for the Red Sox, but allowed a leadoff single to Matsui and walked Lofton with two outs. Alan Embree was brought in to finish the game for Boston. At 12:01 am, on October 21, Rubén Sierra hit a groundball to second baseman Pokey Reese, who threw to first baseman Doug Mientkiewicz to finish the unprecedented comeback. It was their first pennant since 1986. The Red Sox won 10–3 and became the third team in sports history and the first since the National Hockey League's (NHL) New York Islanders in 1975 to win a seven-game series after losing the first three games. For the Yankees, this was their first time losing an ALCS in eight appearances (their last ALCS elimination was in 1980). David Ortiz was named the series MVP.

This was the last ALCS game played at the original Yankee Stadium, as the team did not reach the ALCS again until 2009, the first season for the team at the new Yankee Stadium built one block away.

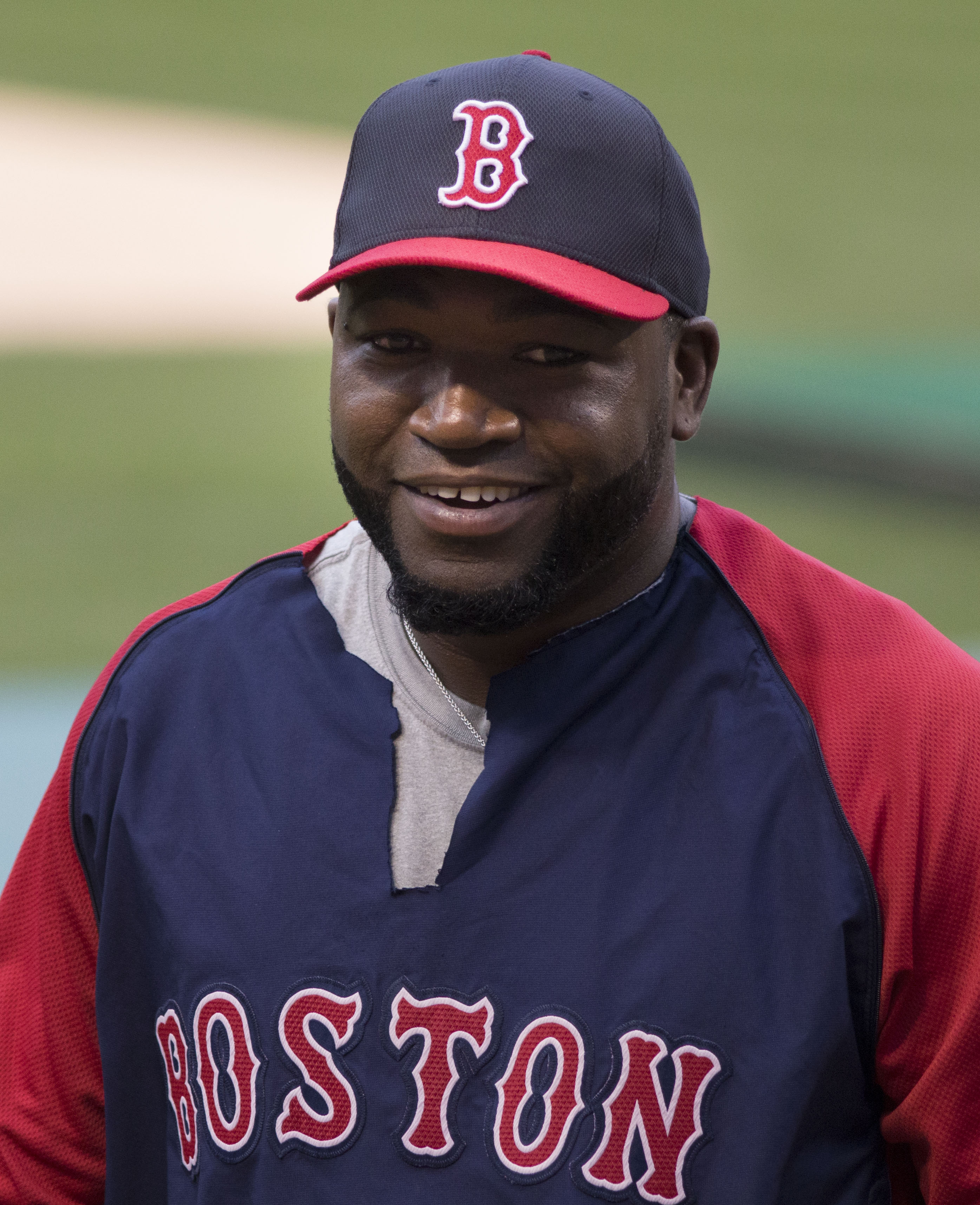
David Ortiz was named ALCS MVP.

== Composite box ==
2004 ALCS (4–3): Boston Red Sox over New York Yankees

The total runs scored (86) makes the 2004 ALCS the highest scoring 7-game series in MLB history.

Team	1	2	3	4	5	6	7	8	9	10	11	12	13	14	R	H	E
Boston Red Sox	4	8	2	6	3	0	7	6	2	0	0	2	0	1	41	75	1
New York Yankees	6	1	10	5	2	9	7	3	2	0	0	0	0	0	45	78	4
Total attendance: 329,600 Average attendance: 47,086

== Player statistics ==
=== Boston Red Sox ===
==== Batting ====
Note: GP=Games played; AB=At bats; R=Runs; H=Hits; 2B=Doubles; 3B=Triples; HR=Home runs; RBI=Runs batted in; BB=Walks; AVG=Batting average; OBP=On base percentage; SLG=Slugging percentage

Player	GP	AB	R	H	2B	3B	HR	RBI	BB	AVG	OBP	SLG	Reference
Jason Varitek	7	28	5	9	1	0	2	7	2	.321	.355	.571	
Kevin Millar	7	24	4	6	3	0	0	2	5	.250	.379	.375	
Mark Bellhorn	7	26	3	5	2	0	2	4	5	.192	.323	.500	
Bill Mueller	7	30	4	8	1	0	0	1	2	.267	.333	.300	
Orlando Cabrera	7	29	5	11	2	0	0	5	3	.379	.424	.448	
Manny Ramirez	7	30	3	9	1	0	0	0	5	.300	.400	.333	
Johnny Damon	7	35	5	6	0	0	2	7	2	.171	.216	.343	
Trot Nixon	7	29	4	6	1	0	1	3	0	.207	.207	.345	
David Ortiz	7	31	6	12	0	1	3	11	4	.387	.457	.742	
Doug Mientkiewicz	4	4	0	2	1	0	0	0	0	.500	.500	.750	
Gabe Kapler	2	3	0	1	0	0	0	0	0	.333	.333	.333	
Pokey Reese	3	1	0	0	0	0	0	0	0	.000	.000	.000	
Doug Mirabelli	1	1	0	0	0	0	0	0	0	.000	.000	.000	
Dave Roberts	2	0	2	0	0	0	0	0	0	─	─	─	

==== Pitching ====
Note: G=Games Played; GS=Games Started; IP=Innings Pitched; H=Hits; BB=Walks; R=Runs; ER=Earned Runs; SO=Strikeouts; W=Wins; L=Losses; SV=Saves; ERA=Earned Run Average

Player	G	GS	IP	H	BB	R	ER	SO	W	L	SV	ERA	Reference
Pedro Martínez	3	2	13	14	9	9	9	14	0	1	0	6.23	
Derek Lowe	2	2	11 1/3	7	1	4	4	6	1	0	0	3.18	
Curt Schilling	2	2	10	10	2	7	7	5	1	1	0	6.30	
Tim Wakefield	3	0	7 1/3	9	3	7	7	6	1	0	0	8.59	
Keith Foulke	5	0	6	1	6	0	0	6	0	0	1	0.00	
Mike Timlin	5	0	5 2/3	10	5	3	3	2	0	0	0	4.76	
Alan Embree	6	0	4 2/3	9	1	2	2	2	0	0	0	3.86	
Bronson Arroyo	3	1	4	8	2	7	7	3	0	0	0	15.75	
Curt Leskanic	3	0	2 2/3	3	3	3	3	2	1	0	0	10.12	
Mike Myers	3	0	2 1/3	5	1	2	2	4	0	0	0	7.71	
Ramiro Mendoza	2	0	2	2	0	1	1	1	0	1	0	4.50	

=== New York Yankees ===
==== Batting ====
Note: GP=Games played; AB=At bats; R=Runs; H=Hits; 2B=Doubles; 3B=Triples; HR=Home runs; RBI=Runs batted in; BB=Walks; AVG=Batting average; OBP=On base percentage; SLG=Slugging percentage

Player	GP	AB	R	H	2B	3B	HR	RBI	BB	AVG	OBP	SLG	Reference
Jorge Posada	7	27	4	7	1	0	0	2	7	.259	.417	.296	
Tony Clark	5	21	0	3	1	0	0	1	0	.143	.143	.190	
Miguel Cairo	7	25	4	7	3	0	0	0	2	.280	.419	.400	
Alex Rodriguez	7	31	8	8	2	0	2	5	4	.258	.378	.516	
Derek Jeter	7	30	5	6	1	0	0	5	6	.200	.333	.233	
Hideki Matsui	7	34	9	14	6	1	2	10	2	.412	.444	.824	
Bernie Williams	7	36	4	11	3	0	2	10	0	.306	.306	.556	
Gary Sheffield	7	30	7	10	3	0	1	5	6	.333	.444	.533	
Rubén Sierra	5	21	1	7	1	1	0	2	3	.333	.417	.476	
John Olerud	4	12	1	2	0	0	1	2	1	.167	.231	.417	
Kenny Lofton	3	10	1	3	0	0	1	2	2	.300	.417	.600	
Bubba Crosby	1	0	1	0	0	0	0	0	0	─	─	─	

==== Pitching ====
Note: G=Games Played; GS=Games Started; IP=Innings Pitched; H=Hits; BB=Walks; R=Runs; ER=Earned Runs; SO=Strikeouts; W=Wins; L=Losses; SV=Saves; ERA=Earned Run Average

Player	G	GS	IP	H	BB	R	ER	SO	W	L	SV	ERA	Reference
Jon Lieber	2	2	14 1/3	12	1	5	5	5	1	1	0	3.14	
Mike Mussina	2	2	12 2/3	10	2	6	6	15	1	0	0	4.26	
Mariano Rivera	5	0	7	6	2	1	1	6	0	0	2	1.29	
Tom Gordon	6	0	6 2/3	10	2	6	6	3	0	0	0	8.10	
Esteban Loaiza	2	0	6 1/3	5	3	1	1	5	0	1	0	1.42	
Javier Vazquez	2	0	6 1/3	9	7	7	7	6	1	0	0	9.95	
Orlando Hernández	1	1	5	3	5	3	3	6	0	0	0	5.40	
Kevin Brown	2	2	3 1/3	9	4	9	8	2	0	1	0	21.60	
Paul Quantrill	4	0	3 1/3	8	0	2	2	2	0	1	0	5.40	
Tanyon Sturtze	4	0	3 1/3	2	2	1	1	2	0	0	0	2.70	
Félix Heredia	3	0	1 1/3	1	0	0	0	1	0	0	0	0.00	

== Records ==
- The Red Sox became the first Major League team to win eight straight postseason games in the same postseason (four straight in the ALCS and four consecutive games in the World Series). The Oakland Athletics had won ten straight postseason games, but they were spread out over two postseasons (the 1989 ALCS and World Series, and the 1990 ALCS). The New York Yankees won 11 straight games also over two consecutive postseasons (the 1998 ALCS and World Series through the 1999 ALDS and into the 1999 ALCS). The 2005 Chicago White Sox repeated this feat, as did the 2014 Kansas City Royals and 2019 Washington Nationals.
- The Red Sox became the third team in North American sports history to lose the first three games of a best-of-seven series and win the last four, joining the 1942 Toronto Maple Leafs and 1975 New York Islanders of the NHL. Boston's NHL franchise, the Bruins, would find themselves on the wrong side of the feat in 2010, losing to the Philadelphia Flyers in the Eastern Conference semifinals.
- At 4 hours and 20 minutes Game 3 was, at the time, the longest nine-inning postseason game in MLB history. That record stood until Game 5 of the 2016 National League Division Series between the Dodgers and Nationals, which took 4:32. The current Red Sox record is Game 4 of their 2018 American League Championship Series against the Houston Astros, which took 4:33; the MLB record is now held by the Cleveland Indians and Yankees in Game 2 of the 2020 American League Wild Card Series, which lasted 4:50.
- In Game 3, Yankee left fielder Hideki Matsui had five hits and five RBIs, tying an American League Championship Series record.
- Game 5, at 5 hours and 49 minutes, was the longest Major League postseason game in history at the time. The record stood until Game 4 of the 2005 National League Division Series between the Astros and the Atlanta Braves, an 18-inning game that lasted 5:50. The current MLB record is held by Game 3 of the 2018 World Series between the Red Sox and the Los Angeles Dodgers, which also lasted 18 innings and took 7:20 to play.
- David Ortiz became the first player to hit two walk-off HRs in the same postseason, 2004 American League Division Series Game 3 and 2004 ALCS Game 4.

== Aftermath and legacy ==
A riot broke out near Fenway Park in Boston following the series win, in which Victoria Snelgrove, an Emerson College journalism student, was accidentally shot and killed by police with an FN 303 pepper spray crowd-controlling projectile round.

After dominating much of baseball since 1996, this would be the closest that the Joe Torre-led Yankees would get to going back to the World Series. They would not get back until 2009 (by which point Joe Girardi had taken over the manager position) when they beat the defending champion Philadelphia Phillies in six games.

The Yankees signed Johnny Damon away from the Red Sox after the 2005 season. In an interview with Jomboy Media in 2021, Damon stated he wanted to stay in Boston, but he believed Red Sox management weren't interested in keeping him due to the emergence of top prospect Jacoby Ellsbury, who scouts compared to Damon. Ironically, Ellsbury would sign with the Yankees as a free agent after a long and successful career in Boston, like Damon.

This series is often seen as a turning point of the Red Sox–Yankees rivalry, which was almost entirely dominated by the Yankees up until this point. From the time the Red Sox's owner Harry Frazee traded Babe Ruth to the Yankees for cash on January 5, 1920, through October 2004, the Yankees were the premier team in baseball, winning a record 26 World Series and 39 pennants in between then. The Red Sox, who were Major League Baseball's most successful franchise until the Ruth trade in 1920, only won a handful of pennants, losing every World Series they played in. However, since 2004, the Red Sox have won four World Series compared to just one Yankees World Series. The 2010s was the first ever decade the Yankees franchise did not play in the World Series since the 1910s, and the first in which they did not win a World Series since the 1980s. In the same decade, the Red Sox won a World Series in 2013 and 2018. On their way to a championship in 2018, the Red Sox defeated the Yankees, now led by Aaron Boone as manager, in four games in the American League Division Series, which was the first postseason match-up between the two rivals since the 2004 AL Championship Series.

The Red Sox and Yankees have met in the postseason four times since 2004 American League Championship Series; the aforementioned 2018 American League Division Series, the 2021 American League Wild Card Game, and the 2025–2026 American League Wild Series, with the Red Sox winning the first two match-ups and the Yankees winning the latter two.

In 2020, the Houston Astros nearly came back from a 3–0 series deficit, but lost in Game 7 of the AL Championship Series to the Tampa Bay Rays. It was the closest a team in Major League Baseball had come to pulling off this feat since the 2004 Red Sox. In the National Hockey League, the 2010 Philadelphia Flyers became the first NHL team to comeback from a 3–0 deficit since the New York Islanders did it in 1975 (they coincidentally beat a team from Boston, the Bruins, in the 2010 Eastern Conference Semifinals to accomplish the feat) en route to the Stanley Cup Final. Four years later in 2014, the Los Angeles Kings came back from 3–0 in a series with the San Jose Sharks in the Western Conference First Round en route to winning the Stanley Cup. To date, no NBA team has ever come back from a 3–0 postseason deficit. However, the Boston Celtics nearly came back from a 3–0 hole against the Miami Heat in the 2023 Eastern Conference Finals before losing Game 7 at TD Garden. In the lead up to the decisive Game 7 of that series, David Ortiz offered words of advice to the Celtics.

In the 2022 American League Championship Series, prior to Game 4 against Astros, Boone had the team mental skills coach show clips from the 2004 series to the team as an attempt at motivating the Yankees, who were down 3–0 in the 2022 series; the Yankees promptly lost Game 4 and were thus eliminated.

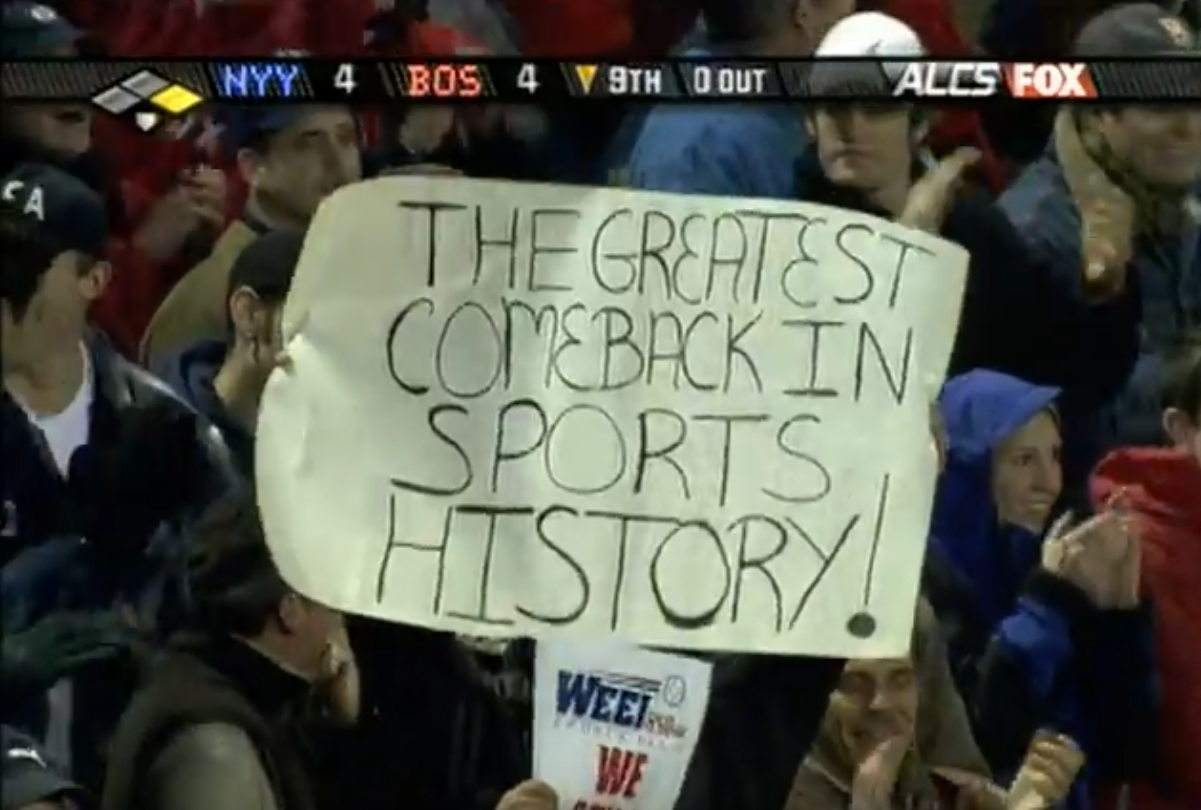
The Greatest Comeback in Sports History seen during Game 4 after Dave Roberts ties 4-4.

The 2004 ALCS and the subsequent World Series has often been described as the "greatest comeback in sports history". During game 4 of the ALCS, after Dave Roberts scores to tie the game 4-4, a sign by a Red Sox fan can be seen with the phrase "The greatest comeback in sports history!"

=== Books and films ===
There have been many books and documentaries about the 2004 Red Sox and the 2004 ALCS. Shortly after their World Series win, authors and Red Sox fans Stephen King and Stewart O'Nan published Faithful, a book chronicling the 2004 Boston Red Sox season, beginning with an e-mail in the summer of 2003, and throughout the 2004 season, from spring training to the World Series. In March 2005, Houghton Mifflin Company published Reversing the Curse, a book by Dan Shaughnessy, author of the bestselling The Curse of the Bambino, chronicling the 2004 Red Sox season, specifically the 2004 ALCS. Sportswriter Bill Simmons wrote Now I Can Die in Peace in 2006. In 2010, ESPN's 30 for 30 featured a documentary named "Four Days in October", which went into depth of the Red Sox's triumph over the Yankees in the 2004 AL Championship Series over the course of 4 days. In 2024, Netflix released a documentary on the Red Sox comeback in 2024, titled The Comeback: 2004 Boston Red Sox.

Fever Pitch, released in 2005, was an American romantic comedy-drama film directed by the Farrelly brothers, starring Drew Barrymore and Jimmy Fallon. It was a remake of the British 1997 film of the same title, based on a 1992 autobiographical book. The 1992 book and 1997 movie were based on Arsenal's last-minute League title win in the final game of the 1988–1989 season, while the 2005 version was adapted to focus on the 2004 Boston Red Sox. During filming of the movie, the script had to be changed due to Boston winning the World Series, which was unanticipated while in production.

== Sources ==
- Shaughnessy, Dan (2005). Reversing the Curse. Boston: Houghton Mifflin Company. ISBN 0-618-51748-0.
