= Pepper-spray projectile =

Law enforcement weapon

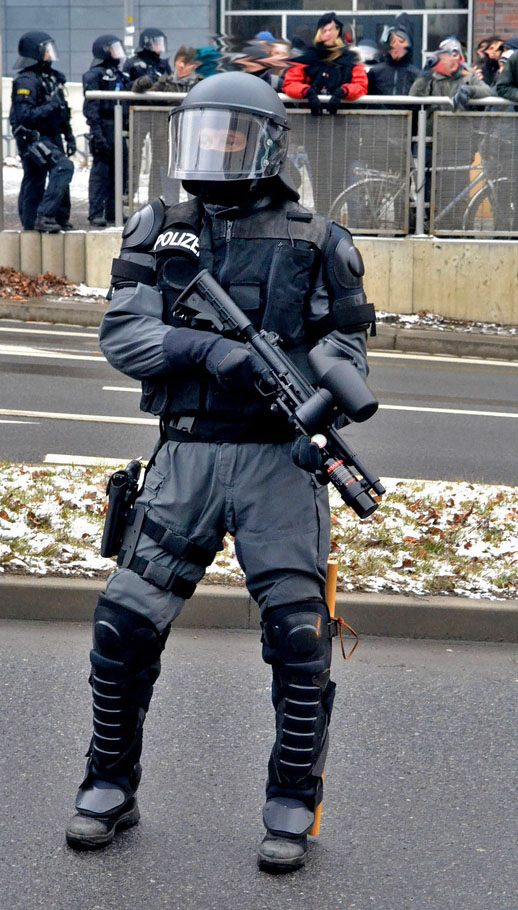
German police officer with Pepperball gun in Dresden

A pepper-spray projectile, also called a pepper-spray ball, pepper-ball, pepper bomb, or pepper-spray pellet, is a frangible projectile containing a powdered chemical that irritates the eyes and nose in a manner similar to pepper spray. These projectiles are fired from specially-designed forced-compliance weapons or modified paintball guns.

== Description ==
A pepper-spray projectile may be a sphere, hence the name pepper-ball, but it may also come in other shapes. The irritant payload differs between products but is usually a powder, less frequently a liquid, gas or aerosol. Some companies offer different substances as payload for their projectiles and launcher systems, allowing potential sellers to choose substances that are certified for use in their country. Also, projectiles with an inert dummy payload are often offered for training and testing purposes.

A powder called PAVA (capsaicin II) pepper is often used. PAVA is a capsaicinoid that can be synthesized more cheaply than natural capsaicin from peppers, although PAVA is also found in nature. Canisters of carbon dioxide are typically used to fire the projectiles.

Pepper-spray weapons systems are used by law enforcement, military and other organizations, and individuals. They are generally used as stand-off weapons, where physical proximity to a suspect is deemed dangerous, but deadly force is not warranted. The systems are not limited to classic standoff situations and allow agents to apply as many rounds as required to cause individual suspects, multiple suspects, or crowds sufficient pain to subdue them.

== Other uses ==
The projectile is usually sold paired with the launcher or gun by the manufacturer. These companies usually also sell other types of projectiles for non-lethal uses, including:

- breaking glass and disperse barricades
- marking suspects for later round-ups
- force-of-impact effect

== Lethality ==
Although generally considered less-than-lethal when properly used (targets should exclude the face, eyes, throat or spine), one death has occurred when they have been fired at inappropriate areas. In one well-publicized incident in 2004, the Boston Police Department's use of an FN 303 during a crowd control situation resulted in the fatal shooting of Victoria Snelgrove when the projectile struck her in the eye. Also in 2004, University of California, Davis (UC Davis), police who wanted to break up a block party shot a pepperball at an unarmed student and damaged his eye. The student subsequently lost his athletic scholarship and dropped out of college. In 2012, a federal appeals court ruled that the police could be sued over the incident. In 2013, the student was awarded $774,000.
