= Damascus House =

2016 book by Corrina Wycoff

- First edition cover
- Author: Corrina Wycoff
- Language: English
- Genre: Novel
- Publisher: Spuyten Duyvil Publishing
- Publication date: March 25, 2016
- Publication place: United States
- Media type: Print (paperback)
- Pages: 252
- ISBN: 978-1-94155-090-8

Damascus House is a 2016 novel by Corrina Wycoff. It follows several members of a fundamentalist Christian church in the aftermath of a dramatic confession.

Wycoff's previous book, the short story collection O Street, was nominated for a Lambda Literary Award for Lesbian Debut Fiction in 2007.

== Plot ==
Amy Rotolo's announcement to her family that she is a lesbian sets off a series of events which threaten to unravel the tight knit members of Pastor Lou Bianchi's fundamentalist Christian church in Riverview, New Jersey. The resulting drama escalates to irrevocably impact Amy's parents Vic and Linda, her "perfect" childhood friend Rachel, Rachel's husband Alan, Rachel's high school boyfriend Paul, and his wife Lee.

== Format and themes ==
Damascus House is a psychological novel written from the perspective of six different characters. Wycoff told the Puyallup Post, "It's not an indictment against the religious community. It asks how we make sense of faith and circumstance. What does it mean to figure out what to believe when you’ve been told what to believe all of your life?"

== Reception ==
Lydia Netzer described the novel as "one family’s love story with a faith so painful and confusing the only salvation is to break apart everything." Deb Olin Unferth called it "riveting" and "addictive", adding that "this dazzling book will win you over fast and then splinter your soul." Cris Mazza wrote:

Damascus House develops rich pathos for those who choose to cut ties as well as those who remain, while delicately maintaining a focus on the human drama, with neither an indictment nor endorsement of religion itself, except to observe how contemporary people use, abuse, rely on, form identity with, can be disillusioned or buoyed by a man-made institution.

Miriam Gershon praised the author, saying "Wycoff writes with authority, precision and a deep empathy that infuses even the most godless of foibles with humanity." Foreword Reviews described Damascus House as "a knockout as a late-blooming bildungsroman", and called it "an astounding, crisp, and un-ironic portrait of one religious community’s unraveling".
