= Penberthy =

Penberthy is a locational surname of Cornish origin, which meant a person from Penberthy Cross in Cornwall. Notable people with the surname include:

- Bob Penberthy (born 1943), British rugby player
- Beverly Penberthy (born 1932), American actress
- Bryan Penberthy (born 1976), American poet
- David Penberthy (born 1969), Australian journalist
- James Penberthy (1917–1999), Australian musician
- Joanna Penberthy (born 1960), Welsh Anglican bishop
- Larry Penberthy (1916–2001), American businessman
- Mike Penberthy (born 1974), American basketball player
- Stan Penberthy (1906–1989), Australian football player
- Tony Penberthy (born 1969), British cricket player

== See also ==
- Penberthy Croft Mine
