= Corrina Wycoff =

American writer

- Occupations: Writer; Professor
- Writing career
- Language: English
- Genre: Fiction
- Notable works: O Street; Damascus House

Corrina Wycoff is an American writer known for her 2007 short story collection O Street and 2016 novel Damascus House. O Street was nominated for a Lambda Literary Award for Lesbian Debut Fiction in 2007.

== Education and career ==
Wycoff holds an MA in English from the University of Illinois at Chicago, an MFA in Creative Writing from the University of Oregon, and taught English at Pierce College in Puyallup, Washington.

Her fiction and essays have appeared in Other Voices, New Letters, Coal City Review, The Oregon Quarterly, Brainchild, Out of Line, Golden Handcuffs, and the anthologies Best Essays Northwest and The Clear Cut Future.

Michelle Abbott wrote of Wycoff in the Puyallup Post:

She began picking up inspirational pieces for her novels at an early age and passed into single motherhood, drawing from realistic and experiential circumstances. From the naturalist perspective, she creates characters affected by low social status, struggling to pull their weight beyond the lowest rung ... Reality sets the stage for Wycoff’s characters, and difficult circumstances pave the way for heightened awareness.

== Works ==
- "Afterbirth" (short story), Heartland Short Fiction Prize (1999), published in New Letters (1999) and O Street (2007), and excerpted in Oregon Quarterly (2007)
- "Visiting Mrs. Ferullo" (short story), Heartland Short Fiction Prize (1999), published in O Street (2007)
- "Rebecca" (short story), Other Voices magazine (Fall/Winter 2002)
- "The Adjunct" (short story), The Clear Cut Future (2003)
- "Another Oregon Trail" (essay), Best Essays Northwest (2003)
- "Rita" (poem), Seattle Poetry on Buses program (2004)
- "The Shell Game" (short story), Coal City Review (2006) and O Street (2007)
- "O Street" (short story), Other Voices magazine (Fall/Winter 2006), Golden Handcuffs Review (Summer/Fall 2006) and O Street (2007)
- O Street (short story collection), OV Books (2007)
- Damascus House (novel), Spuyten Duyvil Publishing (2016)

== Awards and honors ==
In 1999 Wycoff won the second annual Heartland Short Fiction Prize for her stories "Afterbirth" and "Visiting Mrs. Ferullo," and "Afterbirth" was subsequently published in New Letters magazine. Wycoff was a recipient of the John L. and Naomi Luvaas Graduate Fellowship from the College of Arts and Sciences at the University of Oregon in 2000. Wycoff was also a 2003 recipient of a Hugo House Award, which honors writers in the Seattle community and is named for American poet Richard Hugo. Her poem "Rita" was chosen in 2004 for Seattle's Poetry on Buses program, which displays poetry on interior bus placards. In 2007, her short story collection O Street was nominated for a Lambda Literary Award for Lesbian Debut Fiction.

== Personal life ==
A single mother, Wycoff had her son Asher at age 23. She lives in Seattle, Washington.
