= University of Oregon Press =

- Parent company: University of Oregon
- Country of origin: United States
- Headquarters location: Eugene, Oregon
- Publication types: Books

University of Oregon Press, or UO Press is an American university press that is part of the University of Oregon in Eugene, Oregon.

Since June 1, 2005, books published by UO Press have been distributed by the Oregon State University Press.

== Publications ==
=== Best Essays Northwest ===
Best Essays Northwest (2003) is an anthology of essays featuring a foreword by National Book Award-winner Barry Lopez. The contributions are "drawn from the pages of Oregon Quarterly— the University of Oregon's award-winning magazine — and the annual Oregon Quarterly Northwest Perspectives Essay Contest."

==== Contents ====
- "Two Stories Becoming One" / Kim Stafford
- "Picking Fruit" / Kathleen Holt
- "Speaking Oregon" / Brian Doyle
- "A Rope in Rising Waters" / Ross West
- "A Circle of Words" / Beth Hege Piatote
- "Another 100 Years" / Ian Mccluskey
- "Death of a Gyppo" / Robert Leo Heilman
- "The Last Log" / Ellen Waterston
- "Get Off My Cloud" / Steve McQuiddy
- "Migration" / Leslie Leyland Fields
- "Get Off My Log" / Kellee Weinhold
- "Another Oregon Trail" / Corrina Wycoff
- "Train Time" / Susan Rich
- "Air, Earth, Fire, Water" / Jane Kyle
- "I Love the Rain" / Lauren Kessler
- "Accelerate. Focus. Explode" / Cynthia Pappas
- "Take Me Out to the Ballgame" / Guy Maynard, Robert Leo Heilman, Robin Cody and Joni James
- "When He Falls Off a Horse" / Debra Gwartney
- "Army Men" / Paul Keller
- "Finding Frogs" / Cheri Brooks
- "Waiting Out the Wind" / Mark Blaine
- "Grass Man / Charles Goodrich
- "Blood Relation" / Bobbie Willis
- "Fire Ban" / Ana Maria Spagna
- "The Way We Mourn" / Gayle Forman
- "Salmon Run" / Bette Lynch Husted
- "The Untellable Story" / John Daniel

=== Northwest Review Book series ===
Kesey (Book 16) is a collection of notes, manuscripts and drawings by Ken Kesey, author of One Flew Over the Cuckoo's Nest. From the University of Oregon Library Special Collections and originally published in 1977, the works were "selected to illustrate the writer's creative process."

An Anthology of Northwest Writing: 1900–1950 (Book 17) is a collection featuring writings by Woody Guthrie, Mary Barnard and Eva Emery Dye (The Conquest. Originally published in 1979, "Authors and pieces were selected to represent writings typical of the region and time, speak about the history of the region, or simply as enduring, quality prose."

Dialogues With Northwest Writers (originally published in 1982) features interviews with writers such as Ursula K. Le Guin, Tom Robbins, Lawson Fusao Inada, John Keeble, Richard Hugo, James Welch, Mary Barnard and others about their writings and inspirations.

Warnings: An Anthology on the Nuclear Peril (originally published in 1984) is a collection of "fiction, poetry, essays, art and an interview discussing implications of the nuclear age. Contributors include Ken Kesey, William Stafford, Patricia Goedicke, Gary Snyder, John Haines, and Robert Morris."
