= O Street =

2007 short story collection written by Corrina Wycoff

- First edition cover
- Author: Corrina Wycoff
- Cover artist: Robin Hann (photo); Melissa C. Lucar (cover design)
- Language: English
- Genre: Short stories
- Publisher: OV Books/University of Illinois Press
- Publication date: April 2, 2007
- Publication place: United States
- Media type: Print (paperback)
- Pages: 184
- ISBN: 978-0-97671-772-0

O Street is a 2007 short story collection written by Corrina Wycoff. Called a "novel-in-stories" by OV Books, it explores the troubled life of young professional Beth Dinard from the perspective of the character herself as well as others around her. O Street was nominated for a Lambda Literary Award for Lesbian Debut Fiction in 2007.

== Contents ==
The ten stories collected in O Street revolve around the life of young professional Elizabeth Dinard, who has escaped an impoverished and abusive childhood in New Jersey but still suffers its effects in adulthood. Each story, told from the perspective of Beth herself or one of the people around her, explores a different period of her troubled life.

- "The Wrong Place in the World"

- "September 1981"

- "Visiting Mrs. Ferullo"

- "Where We're Going This Time"

- "O Street"

- "Leaving"

- "Afterbirth"

- "The Shell Game"

- "The Cat"

- "Read Me Through the Bardo, Won't You?"

== Themes ==
In a 2007 interview with Time Out Chicago, Wycoff said that the stories were based on the "political truth" that "single mothers fall through the cracks in this country, and the cracks grow in proportion to these women's economic challenges, making inaccessible the so-called American Dream". She explained that, though she drew on her own experiences as a single mother, the stories were not autobiographical.

Michael Upchurch of The Seattle Times wrote that the book recognizes "how even the most toxic family connections have some kind of love threaded through them", and notes that "its heroine, even in the worst circumstances, keeps fierce hold of her dignity". He added:

Wycoff's primary aim is to alight on the story of Beth and her mother from every angle. But behind this is a broader ambition: to show how riddled with pitfalls any attempted escape from the American underclass is. The hazards, Wycoff shows, are psychological as much as they are physical or economic. The isolation Beth feels from every form of social stability undermines almost all her connections with people, no matter how responsibly or industriously she conducts herself.

== Writing and publication ==
Citing author Cris Mazza as her creative muse and mentor, Wycoff noted, "she helped me see that the disparate single-mother stories I'd written could be linked." Wycoff explained, "In a linked-story format, I can present other points of view as short pieces of contrast. I wanted to structure the book so that it begins and ends with a death, because I wanted it to read as a cycle. Linearity, to me, seems more of a construct than cycles." She told Time Out Chicago, "The second [story] I wrote when my son was two years old. I wrote it, in part, in reaction to all of the sentimental, dreamy writing about motherhood." Noting that most writing about motherhood is "so ebullient and romantic", Wycoff told The Stranger that "there are a lot of mothers out there who don't feel that way about motherhood at all."

While seeking a publisher for O Street, Wycoff said, "I got about seven rejections over the course of four years, all from small presses, many of whom called the collection 'too dark'." Picked up by small publisher OV Books, the book's title was initially announced as The Wrong Place in the World, the title of the first story. O Street is also the title of a story in the collection.

Three of the stories have been published previously: "Afterbirth" (in New Letters), "The Shell Game" (in Coal City Review), and "O Street" (in Other Voices magazine). "Afterbirth" and "Visiting Mrs. Ferullo" won the second annual Heartland Short Fiction Prize in 1999. "Afterbirth" was also excerpted in Oregon Quarterly in Spring 2007 in conjunction with the book's release.

== Reception ==
Upchurch wrote of O Street, "This is one grim, tough, upsetting book. Yet it's also shot through with a painful radiance and level intelligence that keep you with it every step of the way." He praised Wycoff's "sharp ear for how speech can signal a gulf between social realities impossible to bridge". Publishers Weekly called the collection "a straightforward look at pain and renewal".

David Bradley praised the book:

O Street makes you think of great writers in strange combinations: Dreiser and Welty; Wright and McCullers; Joan Didion and Stephen Crane. It's been a long time since I've seen naturalism this honest, accurate and unapologetic ... None of this "emerging writer" stuff — this writer is here.

Describing the collection as "White Oleander blown into A Million Little Pieces", Cris Mazza wrote, "Stripped of sentimentality and sanguinity, Corrina Wycoff 's O Street is a relentless stare into the dark yawn of brutality." Alex Shakar praised it as "deeply moving, deftly told, and keenly insightful", and Aimee Liu called it "a harrowing portrait of familial pain, mental illness, and the sometimes cruel tenacity of love". Reviewing the collection for Rain Taxi, Garin Cycholl wrote that "the book sings violently and truly". Comparing O Street to the work of Dorothy Allison "for its depictions of poor women and lesbian relationships", Gretchen Kalwinsky wrote for Time Out Chicago:

Wycoff portrays the gritty, sorrowful elements of her characters' lives head-on and offers no easy solutions—no one's riding up on a white horse, but neither are the stories bleak. Instead, drama and tension are delivered in such a subtle but detail infused way that the reader becomes invested in Beth's plight early on in the collection.

Christopher Frizzelle wrote for The Stranger, "The virtue of the book is the way it deals with topics that have become clichés through characters who aren't clichés. The psychology in O Street is nuanced and feels true."

== Awards ==
O Street was nominated for a Lambda Literary Award for Lesbian Debut Fiction in 2007.
