= OSU Press =

OSU Press may refer to:

- Oregon State University Press
- Ohio State University Press
