= Snow Angels (novel) =

Book by Stewart O'Nan

- Author: Stewart O'Nan
- Publisher: Doubleday
- Publication date: November 3, 1994
- ISBN: 0-385-47574-8

Snow Angels is a 1994 novel by American author Stewart O'Nan.

== Plot ==
Set in 1974 in Butler, Pennsylvania, a county seat 35 miles north of Pittsburgh, Snow Angels is the story of teenager Arthur Parkinson, the disintegration of his parents' marriage, and the murder of Arthur's one-time babysitter, Annie Marchand.

== Reception ==
When the book was still in manuscript, it earned the first Pirate's Alley Faulkner Prize for the Novel, awarded by the Pirate's Alley Faulkner Society of New Orleans. After publication, it received starred reviews from Booklist, Kirkus Reviews, and Publishers Weekly.

== Film adaptation ==
In 2007 Snow Angels was adapted for a film of the same title, directed by David Gordon Green, who also wrote the screenplay, and starring Sam Rockwell and Kate Beckinsale.
