= Killing of Victoria Snelgrove =

2004 police shooting of an American student

- Date: October 21, 2004; 21 years ago
- Time: 12:50 p.m. (EST)
- Location: Boston, Massachusetts, U.S.
- Type: Homicide by shooting, police killing
- Participants: Rochefort Milien (shooter)
- Deaths: Victoria E. Snelgrove, aged 21
- Burial: Calvary Cemetery, Brockton, Massachusetts
- Charges: None
- Litigation: Wrongful death lawsuit against city of Boston settled for $5.1 million; Out-of-court lawsuit against FN Herstal settled for undisclosed amount

Victoria E. Snelgrove (October 29, 1982 – October 21, 2004) was an American journalism student at Emerson College in Boston who died after being shot by officer Rochefort Milien of the Boston Police Department using a less-lethal weapon. The shooting took place following the victory of the Boston Red Sox over the New York Yankees in the 2004 American League Championship Series. In 2005, the city of Boston reached a $5.1 million wrongful death settlement with Snelgrove's family. After filing a wrongful death suit for $10 million against FN Herstal (the manufacturer of the weapon), the family agreed to an out-of-court settlement in June 2006; the final amount of the settlement was not disclosed.

== Killing ==
In the early hours of October 21, 2004, after the Boston Red Sox defeated the New York Yankees at Yankee Stadium in Game 7 of the 2004 American League Championship Series, (Note: Game 7 of the 2004 American League Championship Series was played on October 20 at Yankee Stadium in New York City. The game started at approximately 8:00 p.m. and ended at approximately midnight. Police crowd-control activities near Fenway Park in Boston took place in the early hours of October 21.) the Boston Police Department took action around Fenway Park to control a crowd that had gathered, some of whom were throwing bottles at the police. Approximately 90 minutes after the game ended, officer Rochefort Milien shot Snelgrove with an FN 303 blunt trauma / pepper spray projectile. Snelgrove, who was not acting in an unruly manner, was not Milien's intended target; he had fired at a different person in the crowd. The crowd-control projectile hit Snelgrove in the eye, causing her to bleed heavily. Ambulances were blocked by the excessive crowds, which still refused to clear the area, preventing prompt medical attention from arriving from the dense medical area only a half-mile (0.8 km) away.

Snelgrove died at 12:50 p.m. EDT at Brigham and Women's Hospital in Boston, Massachusetts, about 11 hours after being shot. According to the autopsy, the pellet opened a three-quarter-inch (1.9 cm) hole in the bone behind the eye, broke into nine pieces, and damaged the right side of her brain.

Boston's Police Commissioner, Kathleen O'Toole, placed Milien on paid leave. O'Toole later attended the hour-long funeral on October 26, 2004, at St. John's Catholic Church in East Bridgewater, Massachusetts, along with Mayor of Boston Thomas Menino and Governor of Massachusetts Mitt Romney.

== Investigation and aftermath ==
Commissioner O'Toole accepted the police department's responsibility, while condemning the "punks" who participated in the near-riot. The investigation into Snelgrove's death was led by Donald K. Stern, a former United States Attorney best known for prosecuting mob figures, including fugitive Winter Hill Gang leader James "Whitey" Bulger. Through the investigation, Officer Milien was identified as the person who fired the shot that killed Snelgrove. The report from the investigation outlined 12 recommendations for the Boston Police Department, including a review of use-of-force policies and improved training for less-lethal weapons. On May 2, 2005, the city of Boston announced a $5.1 million wrongful death settlement for her family's lawsuit.

On September 12, 2005, the district attorney for Suffolk County, Daniel F. Conley, announced that he would not prosecute any of the officers involved. Four days later, Commissioner O'Toole demoted the police superintendent who was in charge the night of the shooting to captain and suspended two officers, including Milien, for 45 days without pay. The deputy superintendent outside Fenway Park at the time of the incident was also criticized for poor decisions that led to Snelgrove's death, but had already retired. Milien retired from the Boston Police Department on February 29, 2020.

The weapon that killed Snelgrove was manufactured by Fabrique Nationale de Herstal (FN Herstal). Because of the incident, several police forces, such as the Seattle Police Department, discontinued use of this weapon. In June 2006, a $10 million wrongful death suit between FN Herstal and the Snelgrove family was settled out of court for an undisclosed amount. Boston police never used their FN 303s again, and destroyed them in 2007, stating that they were more powerful and lethal than had been anticipated.

== Memorials ==
Stephen King and Stewart O'Nan dedicated their book Faithful (2004) to Snelgrove; the dedication reads simply: "For Victoria Snelgrove, Red Sox fan." Red Sox outfielder Trot Nixon stated that he would have traded Game 7 of the 2004 ALCS to have her back.

Snelgrove's parents established the Victoria Snelgrove Memorial Fund, "a non-profit organization to carry forward her spirit and concern for others," which awards scholarships to students at East Bridgewater High School and Emerson College. In April 2018, a skatepark in East Bridgewater was opened and named after Snelgrove.
