= Faithful (book) =

Book

- First edition cover
- Authors: Stewart O'Nan; Stephen King
- Language: English
- Subject: Baseball, Boston Red Sox
- Publisher: Scribner
- Publication date: December 2, 2004
- Publication place: United States
- Media type: Print (Hardcover)
- Pages: 432
- ISBN: 978-0-7432-6752-6
- Preceded by: Secret Windows: Essays and Fiction on the Craft of Writing

Faithful is a 2004 book co-written by Stephen King and Stewart O'Nan. It chronicles exchanges between King and O'Nan about the 2004 Boston Red Sox season, beginning with an e-mail in the summer of 2003, and throughout the 2004 season, from spring training to the World Series.

The book was dedicated to Victoria Snelgrove, an Emerson College student who was struck in the eye by the Boston Police Department with a projectile and killed during crowd-control actions near Fenway Park following Game 7 of the American League Championship Series.

On May 4, 2007, The Boston Globe reported that HBO would be adapting the book into a six-part miniseries for 2008. In September 2008, King wrote, "The script is just goddamn hilarious." However, as of 2026, there have been no further developments.
