= Four Days in October =

2010 ESPN documentary film

- Country of origin: United States

Production
- Producers: Gary Waksman, David Gavant and David Check
- Production companies: ESPN; MLB Productions

Original release
- Network: ESPN
- Release: October 5, 2010

Four Days in October is a baseball documentary produced by ESPN and MLB Productions. It is episode 18 in the first season of ESPN's 30 for 30 series.

The film chronicles the last four games of the 2004 American League Championship Series (ALCS) between the Boston Red Sox and the New York Yankees. The series became famous when the Red Sox—who lost the first three games of the series to the Yankees—became the first team in Major League Baseball history (Note: They were the third team in North American modern major professional sports to accomplish the feat, the other two instances being in the NHL—the 1942 Maple Leafs and the 1975 New York Islanders. Since then two other NHL teams—the 2010 Flyers and the 2014 Kings—have also overcome a 3-game deficit in a best-of-7 series.) to win a best-of-seven playoff series after falling behind 0–3.

The documentary begins with highlights of the Red Sox–Yankees rivalry over the years and then shows some highlights from Game 3, which the Yankees won, 19–8, at Fenway Park in Boston. The show's narrative begins with Game 4. The Yankees were just three outs away from sweeping the Red Sox at Fenway Park and advancing to their 40th World Series appearance, when the Red Sox rallied to tie the game in the 9th inning and later won it on a home run by David Ortiz to keep the series alive. The ninth-inning rally proved to be the series' turning point, as the Red Sox proceeded to win the next three games, clinching the series at Yankee Stadium. (Note: The ballpark used in 2004 was demolished in 2010 after the Yankees moved to a new Yankee Stadium in 2009.)

A week later, the Red Sox swept the National League (NL) champion St. Louis Cardinals to win their first World Series championship in 86 years, ending the 2004 postseason on an eight-game winning streak.

While most of the commentary from the players in the documentary is in the usual interview style, Lenny Clarke and Bill Simmons were put in a pub setting, providing a conversation as fans, discussing their own experiences and feelings during the series.

== Cast ==
- Bronson Arroyo
- Lenny Clarke
- Johnny Damon
- Terry Francona
- Pedro Martínez
- Kevin Millar
- David Ortiz
- Dave Roberts
- Curt Schilling
- Bill Simmons

== See also ==
- List of baseball films
