= Last Night at the Lobster =

2007 novella by Stewart O'Nan

- Author: Stewart O'Nan
- Language: English
- Publisher: Viking Press; Allen & Unwin
- Publication date: 5 November 2007
- Publication place: United States
- Pages: 146
- ISBN: 978-0-670-01827-7

Last Night at the Lobster is a novella by American writer Stewart O'Nan, published in 2007.

== Plot ==
The story centres on manager Manny DeLeon and the last shift and closure of a Red Lobster restaurant in New Britain, Connecticut.

O'Nan has said that he was prompted to write the book after reading about a real Red Lobster restaurant which was closed overnight and thinking about "the off-kilter relationship between corporate ownership vs. local constituents".

== Response ==
Response to Last Night at the Lobster has been generally positive. A starred review in The Atlantic commended the book as a "melancholy but never bitter story of a decent guy trying to do the right thing" and O'Nan's writing as able to "coax poetry from the prosaic". Mark Athitakis writing for the Star Tribune called Last Night at the Lobster "a modern classic about shift work". Kirkus Reviews described the book as "very low-key, but haunting and quietly provocative".

In his review for The New York Times, Nathaniel Rich calls the novella "a methodical, minute-by-minute account" of the day but said that O'Nan "can evoke the tedium of the job too effectively", noting the "five full pages" describing the use of a snowblower to clear snow from around the restaurant.

Ian Chipman from Booklist praised O'Nan for his description of the "brisk rushes and dreary lulls" of the restaurant environment, but commented that the work was "intriguing but limited" and "stretches, rather than flexes, O'Nan's considerable talent".

Ron Charles from The Washington Post recommended the novella in his top 10 reads for Labor Day, calling the story "quietly moving" and a "clear-eyed insight into the way millions of people work and get laid off in America".

Upon its release it was chosen as one of Entertainment Weekly's 10 best books of 2007, and it was longlisted for the 2009 IMPAC Dublin prize. In a 2020 article, author and critic Maureen Corrigan named Last Night at the Lobster as "one of [her] favourite books of all time".
