= Other Voices, Inc. =

Other Voices, Inc. is a non-profit literary press encompassing Other Voices literary magazine and the fiction imprint OV Books.

== Other Voices magazine ==
Other Voices magazine, Vol. 45 (Fall/Winter 2006)

Established in 1984, Other Voices was a "fiction-focused magazine ... dedicated to publishing diverse, original short stories by authors ranging from literary bestsellers to cutting-edge experimentalists," as well as interviews with fiction writers and reviews of contemporary fiction. It was headquartered in Chicago, Illinois. The magazine was closed in 2007.

== Contributors ==
Toni Morrison, Dan Chaon, Richard Ford, Stuart Dybek, Antonya Nelson, Jane Smiley, Steve Almond, Tod Goldberg, Josip Novakovich, Aimee Bender, Peter Ho Davies, Michael Cunningham, Sergio Troncoso, Terry McMillan and Junot Díaz. Work from Other Voices was also anthologized in The Best American Short Stories Of The Century (2000), edited by John Updike.

== OV Books ==
The fiction book imprint OV Books aims to "keep the short story form vital in today’s competitive and increasingly commercial marketplace, where short fiction has been largely marginalized by corporate conglomerate publishers."

In collaboration with the University of Illinois Press, OV Books has published Simplify by Tod Goldberg and O Street by Corrina Wycoff.

== See also ==
- List of literary magazines
