= Coal City Review =

Literary journal

The Coal City Review is an annual literary journal of prose, poetry, reviews and illustrations published by the University of Kansas English MFA Program and edited by Brian Daldorph since 1989. The Review typically features the work of many writers, but periodically spotlights one author, as in the case of 2006 Nelson Poetry Book Award-winner voyeur poems by Matthew Porubsky.

== Selected contributions ==
- Jackie Bartley, "Trip to Spain" (poem), Vol. 19 (July 2003)
- Jack Granath, "Lines Written While Fixing a Bicycle" (poem), Vol. 15 (October 2000)
- Jack Granath, "Obligatory Millennial Time Capsule Poem" (poem), Vol. 15, (October 2000)
- Jack Granath, "Dear Aunt May" (poem), Vol. 19 (July 2003)
- Jack Granath, "The Poem Not Written" (poem), Vol. 19 (July 2003)
- Jack Granath, "On Becoming a Poet" (poem), Vol. 21 (2006)
- Jarret Keene, "Monster Fashion" Review, Vol. 19 (July 2003)
- Gary Lechliter, "The Poltergeist Factory" Vol. 19 (July 2003)
- Alana Merrit Mahaffey, "Still Life; The Abandoned Shotgun Shack Across Our Field" (poem), Vol. 19 (July 2003)
- Catherine McCraw, "Frozen Solid" (poem), Vol. 19
- Bryan Penberthy, "Thanks" (poem), Vol. 20, pg. 75 (January 2005)
- Bryan Penberthy, "Through Ice" (poem), Vol. 20, pg. 76 (January 2005)
- Corrina Wycoff, "The Shell Game" (short story), Vol. 21 (2006)
- Byron Case, "Migration" (poem), Vol. 36 (2015)

=== Additional contributors ===
- Marie C. Jones
- Joel Long
- Carrie Oeding
- James R. Whitley

== Selected publications ==
- Porubsky, Matthew. Voyeur Poetry. (2006)
- Musgrave, John. Notes to the Man Who Shot Me: Vietnam War Poems. (2004) 122 pg. ISBN B0006SB6CM
- Musgrave, John. On snipers, laughter and death: Vietnam poems. (2001) 36 pg. ISBN B0006OYS8U
- Lechliter, Gary. Under the Fool Moon. (2001) ISBN 0-8400-0743-4
