= Tod Goldberg =

American novelist and teacher

- Born: January 10, 1971 (age 55); Berkeley, California, U.S.
- Education: Palm Springs High School; California State University, Northridge (BA); Bennington College (MFA)
- Occupations: Writer, journalist
- Spouse: Wendy Duren
- Writing career
- Genre: Mystery fiction
- Website: todgoldberg.com

Tod Goldberg (born January 10, 1971, in Berkeley, California) is an American author and journalist best known for his novels Only Way Out (Thomas & Mercer), Gangsters Don't Die (Counterpoint), Gangster Nation (Counterpoint), Gangsterland (Counterpoint) and Living Dead Girl (Soho Press), the popular Burn Notice series (Penguin/NAL) and the short story collection The Low Desert: Gangster Stories (Counterpoint).

== Early life and education ==
A Jewish author, he graduated from Palm Springs High School in 1989. He attended California State University, Northridge, earning a BA in English. In 2009, he graduated with a master's in fine arts degree in creative writing & literature from Bennington College.

Goldberg describes himself as “profoundly” dyslexic. At six years old, he was told by a doctor that he would never read or write beyond a fourth-grade level.

== Career ==
Goldberg's second novel, Living Dead Girl, was a finalist for the 2003 Los Angeles Times Book Prize for best mystery and was featured as one of January Magazine's top novels of 2002. His third book, Simplify, culled stories from the past decade of his career into one volume, the first published by OV Books, the book publishing arm of the literary journal Other Voices. It received notable reviews in numerous publications, including the Los Angeles Times, Chicago Tribune, The Washington Post and Chicago Sun-Times and was named a 2006 finalist for the Southern California Booksellers Association Award in Fiction. His next book of short stories, Other Resort Cities, was released in October 2009 by OV Books to wide acclaim, including a positive review from the Los Angeles Times.

He is also the author of original novels based on the USA Network TV series Burn Notice. The novels include The Fix, The End Game, The Giveaway, The Reformed, and The Bad Beat. In 2013, his essay "When They Let Them Bleed" was selected for Best American Essays, edited by Cheryl Strayed. Counterpoint published Gangsterland in September 2014 to rave reviews, earning starred notices in Publishers Weekly, Booklist, and Kirkus. The novel was named a finalist for the Hammett Prize, recognizing the excellence in the field of crime writing.

In 2012, Goldberg, Rider Strong, and Julia Pistell started Literary Disco, a podcast about books and writing. It is now part of the LitHub Radio Network and was recently named one of the top literary podcasts by the Washington Post. He is also the co-host of Open Book, along with Maggie Downs, a popular radio interview show in the Coachella Valley on KCOD-FM. In 2021, Goldberg & Downs were named finalist for the Intercollegiate Broadcasting System's Award for Best Community Volunteer Program/Personality.

In 2016, he collaborated with Brad Meltzer on the novel The House of Secrets, also an instant New York Times bestseller. That same year, he was awarded the Silver Pen Award by the Nevada Writers Hall of Fame, which is awarded to a mid-career writer with profound ties to the state of Nevada.

His next novel, Gangster Nation, released in 2017, continued the story of Sal Cupertine/Rabbi David Cohen, picking up two years after Gangsterland's conclusion. The book received glowing reviews in Kirkus, Publishers Weekly, Booklist, Mystery Scene Magazine, the Orange County Register, and numerous other outlets. Both novels were optioned by Caryn Mandabach Productions and later by Amazon Studios.

The Low Desert: Gangster Stories, a "Gangster Universe" anthology, introduces new characters and revisits those from Gangsterland and Gangster Nation. It received a starred and boxed review in Publishers Weekly, a starred review in Kirkus, a rave review in the Los Angeles Times, was named a top 10 book of Spring by Publishers Weekly, a top 20 book of winter by USA Today, and a most anticipated book of the year by CrimeReads.

In September 2023, his novel Gangsters Don't Die, the concluding volume in the Gangsterland trilogy, was released. It was named a Southwest Book of the Year, an Amazon Best Book of the Year, and a CrimeReads Notable Book of The Year, among many other honors.

In fall 2024, Eight Very Bad Nights, a collection of Hanukkah Noir that he edited, was released by Soho Press, and included stories by him, his brother Lee Goldberg, and authors Ivy Pochoda, David Ulin, Gabino Iglesias, James D.F. Hannah, Nikki Dolson, Jim Ruland, Stephanie Leder, J.r. Angella, and Liska Jacobs. In March 2025, the International Thriller Writers announced that Leder's story was a finalist for the Best Short Story Thriller Award and was selected for Best American Mystery & Suspense. Goldberg was also selected for Best American Mystery & Suspense for his story "A Dog's Year" from the anthology The Killing Rain. Previously, Goldberg was selected for the 2022 edition of Best American Mystery & Suspense for his story "A Career Spent Disappointing People" (retitled "The Royal Californian" in The Low Desert). Goldberg also received Distinguished Story recognition in Best American Mysteries 2009 for his story "Mitzvah" from Las Vegas Noir and in Best American Mystery & Suspense 2024 for his story "Paladin" from Playing Games, edited by Lawrence Block.

In fall of 2025, Thomas & Mercer released Goldberg's latest novel, "Only Way Out," to rave reviews, including a starred review in Kirkus. The book was an Amazon First Reads selection for the month of November, making it an instant bestseller. In 2026, it was named a finalist for the Los Angeles Times Book Prize. Also in 2026, his essay "At the Knee," which first appeared in Alta, was honored by the American Society of Journalists and Authors.

In addition to his fiction, Goldberg has served as a book and cultural critic for several weekly newspapers in Las Vegas, including the Mercury, CityLife, and The Weekly, earning five Nevada Press Association Awards. He has also written for USA Today, the Los Angeles Times, and the Los Angeles Review of Books, among many others.

== Personal life ==
He is a professor of creative writing at the University of California, Riverside where he founded and directs the Low Residency MFA in Creative Writing & Writing for the Performing Arts. Previously, as an instructor of creative writing at the University of California, Los Angeles Extension Writers' Program, he was named Teacher of the Year in 2005. He is the brother of New York Times bestselling novelist and TV writer/producer Lee Goldberg and authors Linda Woods and Karen Dinino, as well as the nephew of true crime author and novelist Burl Barer, and the son of journalist and author Jan Curran and television broadcast journalist Alan Goldberg. He grew up in Walnut Creek, California, and Palm Springs, California, and currently lives in Indio, California, with his wife, Wendy Duren, also a writer.
