= The Circus Fire =

Non-fiction book by Stewart O'Nan

The Circus Fire: A True Story of an American Tragedy
- Author: Stewart O'Nan
- Language: English
- Genre: Non-fiction
- Published: 2000
- Publication place: USA
- Pages: 384
- ISBN: 9780385496858

The Circus Fire: A True Story of an American Tragedy is a 2000 non-fiction book by Stewart O'Nan. It is about the deadly Hartford circus fire of 1944.
