= Everyday People (novel) =

2001 novel by Stewart O'Nan

- Author: Stewart O'Nan
- Language: English
- Genre: Novel
- Publisher: Grove Press
- Publication date: 2001
- Publication place: United States
- Media type: Print (hardback)
- Pages: 295
- ISBN: 0-8021-1681-7
- OCLC: 45100246

Everyday People is a novel by the American writer Stewart O'Nan.

It is set in 1998 in East Liberty and brings together the stories of its residents, mostly African-American during one fateful week in the early fall. The novel centers around Chris "Crest" Tolbert—an eighteen-year-old left paralyzed and haunted by the loss of his best friend after a recent accident—and O'Nan weaves together the lives of friends and family, lovers and strangers, and their emotions, memories, and dreams.
