= Bryan Penberthy =

American poet (born 1976)

Bryan Penberthy (born December 29, 1976) is an American poet. Born in Dearborn, Michigan, in 1976, he was raised near Leavenworth, Kansas. He received his B.A. from Kansas State University in 2000, and his M.F.A. from Purdue University in 2003. During his time at Purdue, Penberthy served as Poetry Editor for Sycamore Review.

His debut collection of poetry, Lucktown, was awarded the National Poetry Review Book Prize and was published in 2007. His poetry has appeared in many journals, including Crazyhorse, Coal City Review, New Orleans Review, River Styx, Bat City Review, and Poetry International, as well as online by Blackbird and Verse Daily. Interviews he conducted with Yale Series of Younger Poets winner Maurice Manning (poet) and James Laughlin Award recipient Tony Hoagland were published in Sycamore Review.

Penberthy has taught at Purdue University, at the Charleston Air Force Base through the City Colleges of Chicago’s Programs for the Military, Trident Technical College, Summerville High School, ECPI University, and Savannah Technical College. He lives in Gainesville, Florida. He currently works at the University of Florida.

== Bibliography ==
- Lucktown (The National Poetry Review Press, 2007)

== Awards ==
- Finalist (for Lucktown), 2007 T. S. Eliot Prize (Truman State University)
- Honorable Mention (for Lucktown), 2006 Stevens Manuscript Competition (National Federation of State Poetry Societies)
- Semi-finalist (for Lucktown), 2006 Elixir Press Poetry Book Award
- Association of Writers & Writing Programs (AWP) Intro Award for Poetry (2000)
