= Leslie Leyland Fields =

American author and editor

Leslie Leyland Fields is an American author and editor from Kodiak Island, Alaska.

Her books have been translated into Chinese, French, Polish, Korean, Ukrainian, Slovak and German and reviewed in the (London) Times Literary Supplement, The Chicago Tribune, the Utne Reader, Sports Illustrated for Women, The Portland Oregonian, The Seattle Times, Women and Health, Oregon Review, and many others.

Her essays have appeared in numerous publications, including The Atlantic Monthly, Orion, Image: Art, Faith, Mystery, Books and Culture, Best Essays Northwest, Christianity Today, It’s a Girl: Women Writers on Raising Daughters, On Nature: Great Writers on the Great Outdoors, A Mile in Her Boots: Women Who Work in the Wild, America and the Sea: A Maritime History, and many others earning her Pushcart nominations, the Virginia Faulkner Award, and a Genesis Award. She was a founding faculty member of Seattle Pacific University's MFA program where she taught creative nonfiction for six years. Previously she taught Literature and creative writing at the University of Alaska. She is a national speaker addressing topics of faith and culture at conferences, retreats, and churches; and a popular radio guest with more than 200 interviews on stations around the country.

Her poetry has appeared in The Seattle Review, the Bellingham Review, the Northern Review, Patches of Godlight: Father Tim’s Favorite Quotes, and many more.

Fields is founder of the Harvester Island Wilderness Workshop, an annual writers' workshop on her family's wilderness island in Alaska that has hosted PhilipYancey, Ann Voskamp, Bret Lott, Luci Shaw and others.

Her education includes:

- Cedarville University, B.A. English
- University of Oregon, M.A. English
- University of Oregon, M.A. Journalism
- Goddard College, M.F.A. Creative Nonfiction

== Bibliography ==
=== Books ===
- The Wonder Years: 40 Women over 40 on Aging, Faith, Beauty, and Strength
- The Spirit of Food: 34 Writers on Feasting and Fasting Toward God
- Hooked! True Stories of Obsession, Death and Love from Alaska’s Commercial Fishing Men and Women
- Parenting is Your Highest Calling...and Eight Other Myths (Waterbrook)
- Surviving the Island of Grace (Thomas Dunne)
- Surprise Child: Finding Hope in Unexpected Pregnancy
- Out on the Deep Blue (St. Martin's)
- The Entangling Net: Alaska’s Commercial Fishing Women Tell Their Lives (Univ. of Illinois Press)
- The Water Under Fish (poetry).
- Forgiving Our Fathers and Mothers:Finding Freedom from Hate and Hurt (Thomas Nelson, 2014).
- Crossing the Waters: Following Jesus through the Storms, the Fish, the Doubt, and the Seas (NavPress, 2016)

=== Articles ===
- The Greatest Call: Come, Follow Me - even the most menial job can be christened 'sacred' by Jesus - Today's Christian Woman
- Forgiving the Sins of My Father: How he taught me the deeper meaning of mercy - Christianity Today
- Rest Works: For Matthew Sleeth Sabbath-keeping furthers both our happiness and holiness - Christianity Today
- A Feast Fit for the King: Returning the growing fields and kitchen table to God - Christianity Today
- The Gospel is More than a Story: Rethinking Narrative and Testimony - Christianity Today
