= Stewart O'Nan =

American novelist

- Born: February 4, 1961 (age 65); Pittsburgh, Pennsylvania, U.S.
- Education: Boston University (BS); Cornell University (MFA)
- Occupation: Novelist
- Spouse: Trudy Anne Southwick (m. 1984)
- Writing career
- Period: 1993–present
- Genres: Literary fiction, horror fiction
- Website: www.stewart-onan.com

Stewart O'Nan (born February 4, 1961) is an American novelist.

== Life and work ==
=== Early life and early career ===
Born on February 4, 1961, to John Lee O'Nan II and Mary Ann O'Nan (née Smith), he and his brother John were raised in Pittsburgh, Pennsylvania, where their father worked for Alcoa. O'Nan earned his B.S. in Aerospace Engineering at Boston University in 1983. While in Boston, O'Nan became a fan of the Red Sox. On October 27, 1984, he married Trudy Anne Southwick, his high school sweetheart. They moved to Long Island, New York, and he went to work for Grumman Aerospace Corporation in Bethpage, New York, as a test engineer from 1984 to 1988. Encouraged by his wife to pursue a career in writing, they moved to Ithaca, New York, and O'Nan returned to college and graduated with his M.F.A. from Cornell University in 1992. His family and he then moved to Edmond, Oklahoma, and he taught at the University of Central Oklahoma and the University of New Mexico. From 1995 to 1998, he was a writer-in-residence at Trinity College in Hartford, Connecticut.

=== Short stories ===
O'Nan's first book, and only collection of short stories, In the Walled City, was awarded the 1993 Drue Heinz Literature Prize. Many of the stories in that collection also originally appeared in publications such as Ascent (the short story "Econoline"), Columbia (the short story "The Third of July"), Jam To-Day (the short story "Mr Wu Thinks"), The Nebraska Review (the short story "Winter Haven), Northwest Review (the short story "The Finger"), The South Dakota Review (the short story "The Calling") and The Threepenny Review (the short story "Steak").

=== Novels ===
Also in 1993, O'Nan was able to find a publisher for his second book, and first novel, Snow Angels—based on the story "Finding Amy" from In the Walled City—when the manuscript earned him the first Pirate's Alley Faulkner Prize for the Novel, awarded by the Pirate's Alley Faulkner Society of New Orleans.

In 1995, his family and he moved to Avon, Connecticut. He was a writer-in-residence and taught creative writing at Trinity College in nearby Hartford until 1997. The research he did for his novel The Names of the Dead led to the creation of a class that studied Vietnam War memoirs as a form of literature, which he also initially taught. In 1996, Granta named him one of America's Best Young Novelists.

In a 2002 article, "Finding Time to Write," he wrote:

Very simple things like keeping the manuscript with you at all times. Always keep it with you. That way you can always go back to it. Doesn't have to be the whole manuscript. Another way to do this is to bring only the very last sentence that you worked on--where you left off, basically. Bring it with you on a sheet of paper or index card. Keep it on your person so that if you're running around the building where you're working, you take that five seconds to pull it out and look at it and say, "Okay, oh, maybe I'll do this with it. Maybe I'll do something else with it. Maybe I'll fix it there."

A Face in the Crowd is a novella by Stephen King and O'Nan, originally published as an e-book on August 21, 2012, as well as an audiobook, read by Craig Wasson.

In 2015, O'Nan released a novel entitled West of Sunset, about the last days of writer F. Scott Fitzgerald as he moves out to Los Angeles after being ruined financially and experiencing health problems, after his wife is put in an insane asylum. Filmmaker James Ponsoldt has been in negotiations to write and direct a film adaptation of the book, with actors like Tom Hanks, Emily Watson and Alicia Vikander currently being attached.

=== Nonfiction books ===
When he researched The Circus Fire, he advertised in The Hartford Courant and received many answers to his request for interviews with survivors of the Hartford Circus fire.

In the spring of 2005 O'Nan spoke at the Lucy Robbins Welles Library in Newington, Connecticut, as the featured author in its One Book, 4 Towns program. In an article for Connecticut Magazine, when asked about Faithful: Two Diehard Boston Red Sox Fans Chronicle the Historic 2004 Season, the book he co-authored with Stephen King, O'Nan replied, "I always tell my friends that the luckiest thing that ever happened to me was becoming a Red Sox fan."

=== Screenplays and other writing ===
In 2008, Lonely Road Books sold out its pre-orders for O'Nan's latest writing, a screenplay simply titled Poe. It is a dramatic retelling of the life of Edgar Allan Poe. The screenplay was released as a limited edition of 200 copies and as a lettered edition of 26 copies. It features a foreword by Roger Corman and frontispieces by Jill Bauman.

=== Adaptations ===
In 2007 Snow Angels was adapted for a film of the same title, directed by David Gordon Green, who also wrote the screenplay, and which starred Sam Rockwell and Kate Beckinsale.

A film adaptation titled A Prayer for the Dying, based on his 1999 novel of the same name, began filming in 2024, starting Johnny Flynn and John C. Reilly. It premiered in February 2026 at the 2026 Berlin International Film Festival.

== Works ==
=== Short story collections ===
- In the Walled City (University of Pittsburgh Press, 1993)

=== Novels ===
- Transmission (Arjuna Library, 1987)
- Snow Angels (Doubleday/BDD, 1994)
- The Names of the Dead (Doubleday/BDD, 1996)
- The Speed Queen (Doubleday/BDD, 1997)
- A World Away (Henry Holt/Macmillan, 1998)
- A Prayer for the Dying (Henry Holt/Macmillan, 1999)
- Everyday People (Grove Press, 2001)
- Wish You Were Here (Grove Press, 2002)
- The Night Country (Farrar, Straus & Giroux/Macmillan, 2003)
- The Good Wife (Farrar, Straus & Giroux/Macmillan, 2005)
- Last Night at the Lobster (Viking/Penguin, 2007)
- Songs for the Missing (Viking/Penguin, October 2008)
- Emily, Alone (Viking/Penguin, March 2011)
- The Odds (Viking/Penguin, January 2012)
- A Face in the Crowd (Simon & Schuster Digital, August 2012) (e-book and audiobook novella co-written with Stephen King)
- West of Sunset (Viking/Penguin/PRH, January 2015)
- City of Secrets: a novel (Viking, 26 April 2016) ISBN 978-0670785964
- Henry, Himself (Viking, May 2019)
- Ocean State (Atlantic Monthly Press, March 2022)
- Evensong (Atlantic Monthly Press, November 2025)

=== Screenplays ===
- Poe (Lonely Road Books, 2008)

=== Nonfiction ===
- The Circus Fire (Doubleday, 2000)
- Faithful: Two Diehard Boston Red Sox Fans Chronicle the Historic 2004 Season (with Stephen King) (Scribner, 2004)

=== As editor ===
- On Writers and Writing by John Gardner (Addison-Wesley, 1994)
- The Vietnam Reader: The Definitive Collection of Fiction and Nonfiction on the War (Anchor Books, 1998)
