= Orlando Cabrera =

Colombian-American baseball player (born 1974)

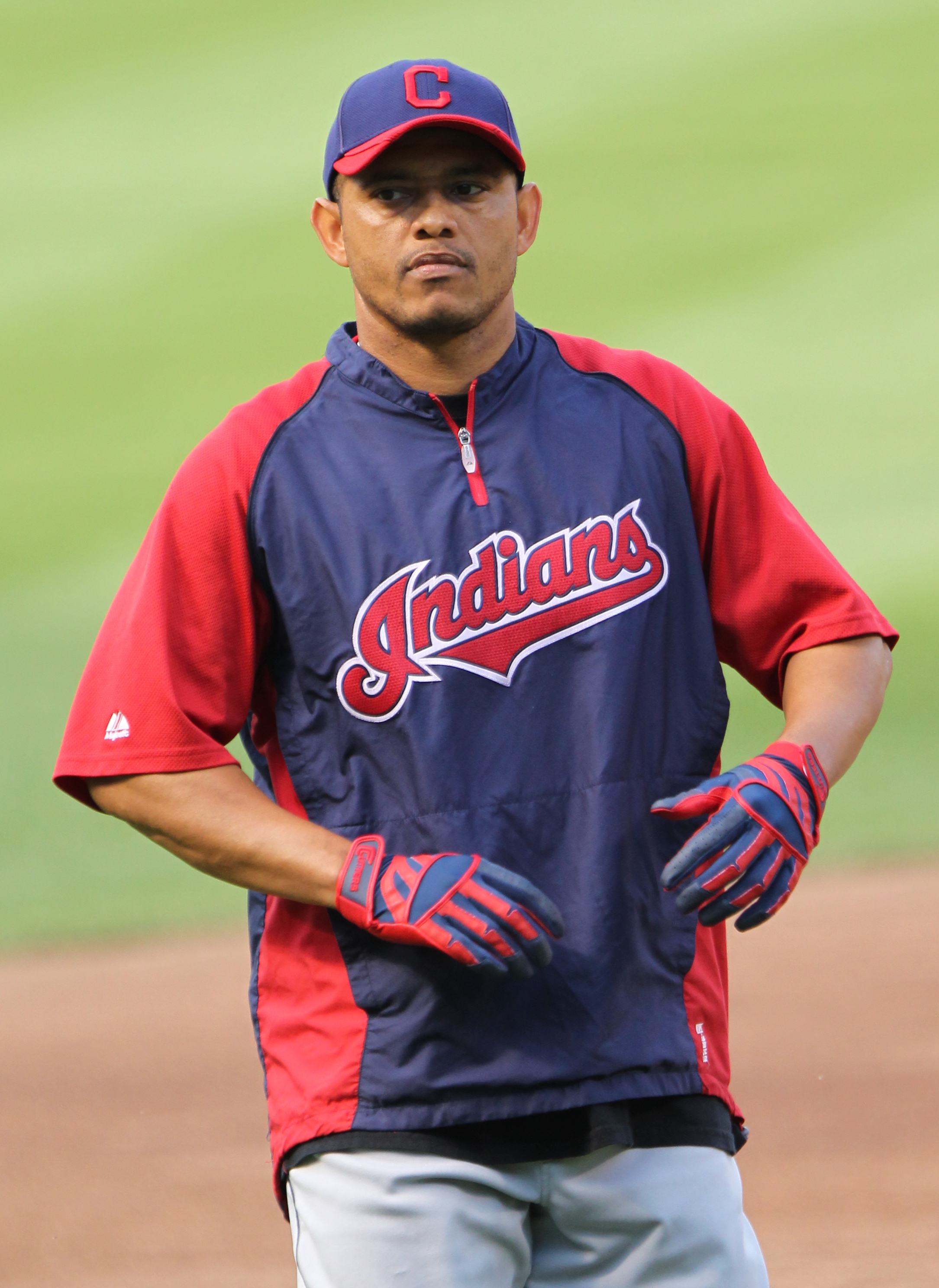
- Cabrera with the Cleveland Indians in 2011
- Shortstop
- Born: November 2, 1974 (age 52); Cartagena, Colombia
- Batted: Right Threw: Right

MLB debut
- September 3, 1997, for the Montreal Expos

Last MLB appearance
- September 23, 2011, for the San Francisco Giants

MLB statistics
- Batting average: .272
- Hits: 2,055
- Home runs: 123
- Runs batted in: 854
- Stats at Baseball Reference

Teams
- Montreal Expos (1997–2004); Boston Red Sox (2004); Los Angeles Angels of Anaheim (2005–2007); Chicago White Sox (2008); Oakland Athletics (2009); Minnesota Twins (2009); Cincinnati Reds (2010); Cleveland Indians (2011); San Francisco Giants (2011)

Career highlights and awards
- World Series champion (2004); 2× Gold Glove Award (2001, 2007)

Orlando Luis Cabrera Ramírez (born November 2, 1974), nicknamed "O-Cab" and "the OC", is a Colombian-American former baseball infielder.

He won the 2004 World Series championship with the Boston Red Sox. He also played for the Montreal Expos, Los Angeles Angels of Anaheim, Chicago White Sox, Oakland Athletics, Minnesota Twins, Cincinnati Reds, Cleveland Indians and San Francisco Giants. Cabrera is the younger brother of former major leaguer Jolbert Cabrera.

Cabrera won the Gold Glove Award in 2001 and in 2007. He announced his retirement before the 2012 season.

== Early life ==
Orlando Luis Cabrera Ramírez was born on November 2, 1974, in Cartagena, Colombia.

== Professional career ==
=== Montreal Expos (1997–2004) ===
Cabrera signed with the Expos as a non-drafted free agent in 1993. He made his major league debut on September 3, 1997, against the Boston Red Sox, entering as a defensive replacement for Mark Grudzielanek at shortstop and finishing the game 0-for-2. Cabrera recorded his first major league hit, a single, off New York Mets pitcher Rick Reed on September 11. On July 18, 1999, Cabrera popped up to end David Cone's perfect game.

In 2002, he led all major league ballplayers in errors, totaling 29.

In 2003, Cabrera finished second among the league shortstops in batting average (.297), slugging percentage (.415), runs batted in (80), and stolen base percentage (24-to-26). In addition, he was one of four Expos players to have played all 162 games in a season, and the first to do it twice. Also, his 17 home runs that season were the most ever by a shortstop in Expos history.

Since the Expos traded Cabrera to the Red Sox in 2004, he appeared in six of the seven MLB postseasons, and at least once with every team he spent the end of the season with (2004 with Boston, 2005 and 2007 with Los Angeles, 2008 with Chicago, 2009 with Minnesota, and 2010 with Cincinnati).

=== Boston Red Sox (2004) ===
Cabrera was traded to the Boston Red Sox on July 31, 2004, as part of a four-team trade. Cabrera batted .294 with six home runs and 31 RBIs in 58 games with the Red Sox. He also brought stability to the shortstop position. The trade, which also netted first baseman Doug Mientkiewicz from the Twins, shored up Boston's infield defense and energized the team, which went 42–19 after the deal to win the American League's wild card (56–45 before the trade). "He is a game-changer in the field for me", Curt Schilling said. He hit a home run on his first at-bat with the Red Sox on August 1, becoming the eighth Boston player to accomplish the feat. In Game 2 of the 2004 ALDS, he hit a bases-clearing double, helping the Red Sox sweep the Anaheim Angels. Boston went on to win its first World Series title since 1918 with a four-game sweep of the St. Louis Cardinals.

=== Los Angeles Angels of Anaheim (2005–07) ===
Following his 2004 World Series victory with the Red Sox, Cabrera agreed to a four-year, $32 million contract as a free agent with the Anaheim Angels (later renamed Los Angeles Angels of Anaheim) on December 20, 2004. He replaced David Eckstein at shortstop. Also reuniting him with his former Expos teammate Vladimir Guerrero.

In 2007, Cabrera led qualified AL shortstops with a .983 fielding percentage and a league-low 11 errors, earning him the American League Gold Glove for shortstop, the first by an Angel shortstop since Jim Fregosi in 1967. Also, he stole 20 bases for the third straight year and the fifth time overall.

Cabrera had a 63-game on-base streak in early-through-mid-2006, which was the sixth-longest streak of all time. Ted Williams holds the Major League record with 84 straight games reaching base. Cabrera also had a straight steal of home plate on July 2, 2006, the first such time it had been accomplished by an Angels player since 1997. Cabrera scored without a throw.

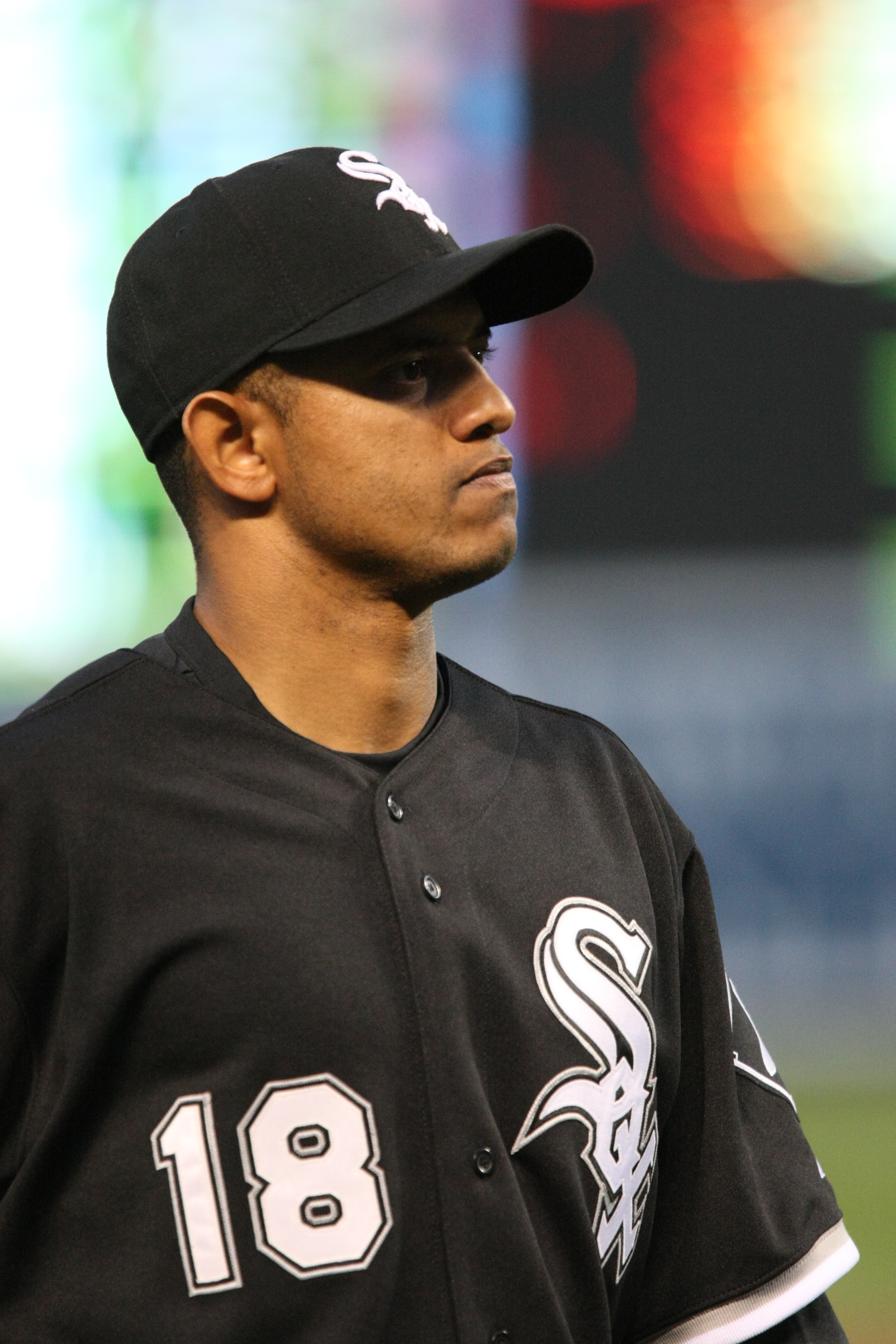
Cabrera with the Chicago White Sox in 2008.

=== Chicago White Sox (2008) ===
On November 19, 2007, Cabrera was traded to the Chicago White Sox along with cash considerations for Jon Garland. Cabrera's one season with White Sox was marred with controversy: arguing with manager Ozzie Guillén, leaving the clubhouse early to avoid the media, calling the press box to have errors overturned, questioning his team's attitude, and kicking dirt at Tampa Bay Rays pitcher Grant Balfour during an at-bat in Game 1 of the AL Divisional Series.

=== Oakland Athletics (2009) ===
On March 6, 2009, Cabrera signed a one-year deal and played middle infield with the Oakland Athletics. In 101 games with the A's, he batted .280 with four home runs and 41 RBI in 101 games.

=== Minnesota Twins (2009) ===
On July 31, 2009, Cabrera was traded to the Minnesota Twins with cash considerations for shortstop Tyler Ladendorf.

In 2009, Cabrera led all major league players in errors, with 25. He had a solid offensive year, finishing the season batting .284, with 186 hits (fourth among all shortstops), nine home runs and 77 RBI (first among AL shortstops and fourth out of all shortstops) in 160 games. His seventh-inning, two-run home run in the American League Central Division's tiebreaker game on October 6, 2009, kept the Twins in the game, which they later won, 6–5, in the 12th inning, to advance to post-season play.

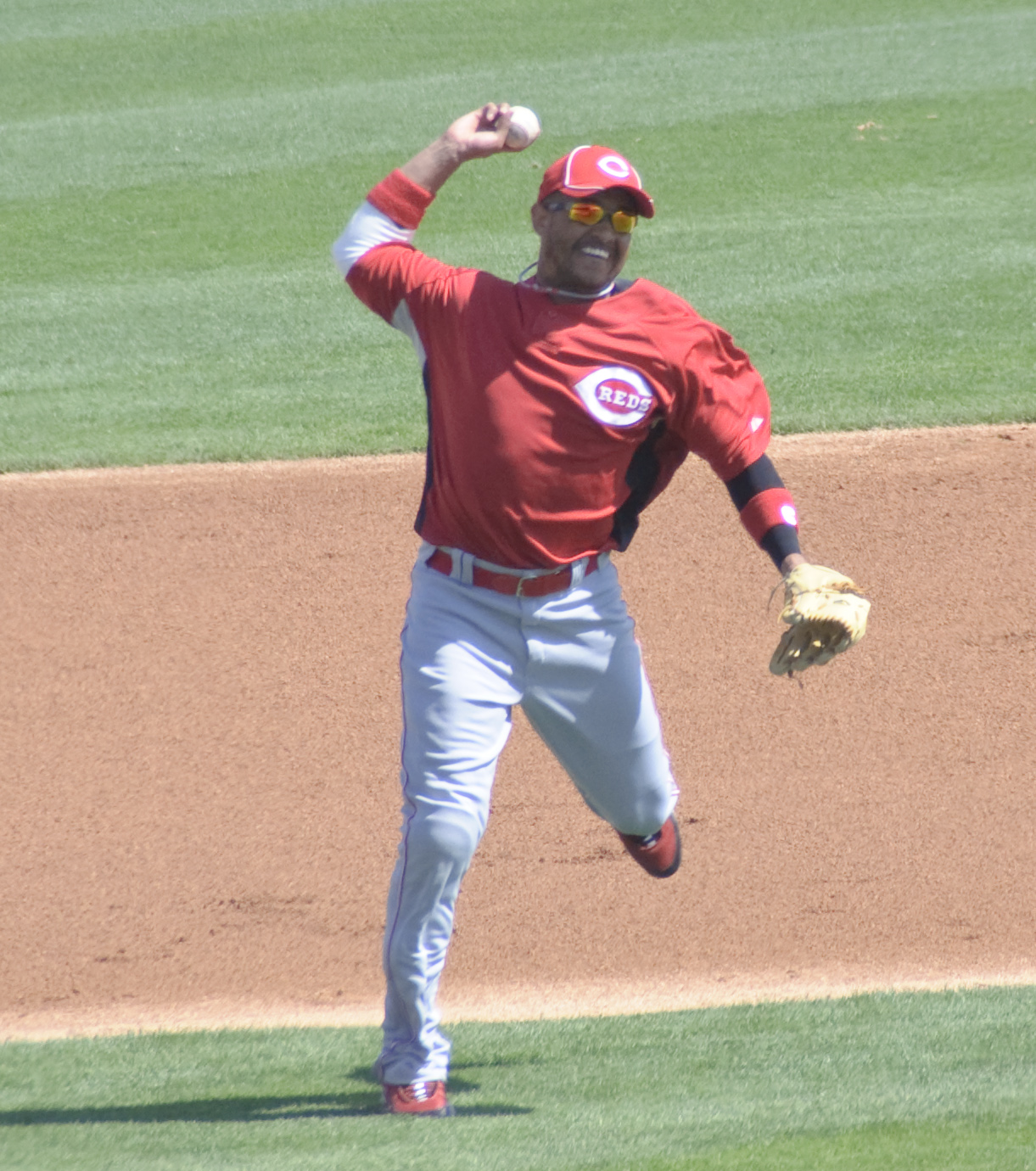
Cabrera with the Cincinnati Reds in 2010.

=== Cincinnati Reds (2010) ===
On February 1, 2010, Cabrera signed a one-year contract with the Cincinnati Reds that included a mutual option for 2011. Cabrera spent the season as the Reds shortstop and posted a .263 average with four home runs, 42 RBI, and a .303 on-base percentage. Cabrera played in only 123 games due to a strained oblique muscle that kept him on the DL from August 3 to September 3. The injury continued to bother him in September and into the playoffs, culminating with Dusty Baker giving him the start in Game 3 of the NLDS despite Cabrera mentioning pain. In the first inning, Cabrera made a high throw to first that allowed a run to score. While on the disabled list, Cabrera spent one game in full batboy uniform, bringing balls to the umpire and collecting bats.

The Reds declined the option for 2011 on his contract with a $1 million buyout. Reds general manager Walt Jocketty expressed that he wanted to bring back Cabrera at a price lower than the $4 million option.

=== Cleveland Indians (2011) ===
On February 10, 2011, Cabrera signed a one-year contract with the Cleveland Indians. With Asdrúbal Cabrera in place at shortstop, Cabrera switched to playing second base. On June 12, 2011, Cabrera got his 2,000th hit in Yankee Stadium off of pitcher Freddy García.

On July 21, Jason Kipnis was called up to share duties with Cabrera, who had hit .172 in the month of July and .244/.275/.323 for the season.

=== San Francisco Giants (2011) ===
On July 30, 2011, Cabrera was traded to the San Francisco Giants for minor league outfielder Thomas Neal. He was originally given the number 6, but opted to wear number 43, out of respect for J. T. Snow.

=== Retirement ===
On January 18, 2012, Cabrera announced his retirement on a radio show in his native home country of Colombia. In November of the same year, his brother Jolbert said Orlando could have come out of retirement and played for the Colombia national baseball team if they had advanced to the final round of the 2013 World Baseball Classic.

== Personal life ==
Cabrera became a naturalized U.S. citizen on May 19, 2011, in South Carolina. Cabrera, a Colombian national, had faced extra scrutiny when traveling through customs due to Colombia's reputation for drug trafficking. As of 2014, he lives in Windham, New Hampshire, with his wife Katie Cabrera.
