= University of Oregon media =

The University of Oregon has a diverse array of student-run and non-student-run media outlets.

== Newspapers ==
=== Daily Emerald ===
The Daily Emerald, published Monday through Friday, primarily features news items and commentary pertaining to the University community, and is considered the daily paper of record. In addition to the print newspaper, the Emerald publishes its features on the internet. The Emerald has been in publication for more than 100 years. A court case involving the Emerald's publication of several first-hand student accounts of drug use during the 1960s became the basis for the subsequent creation of the Oregon Shield Law. The paper became independent in the 1970s after editor Paul Brainerd realized the potential conflict of interest between acting as a watchdog while simultaneously receiving direct funding and oversight from the university. Today the paper is supported by advertising revenue and is distributed free to students because of a subscription fee paid by the ASUO with incidental fees.

== Magazines and quarterlies ==
=== Align Magazine ===
Align Magazine is the University of Oregon's official arts and culture magazine with an emphasis on lifestyle and fashion, established in 2015 as an Instagram account for outfits around campus. As interest in the account grew, more writing, art, and photography were produced for the magazine. Align Magazine continues to grow and conceptualize as a platform that experiments with creative ideas and fosters community and collaboration. With 250-plus members, it's the largest club and publication on campus. It publishes three digital and printed magazine issues every academic year and posts video, music, and audio content on its website and social media.

=== Art Ducko ===
Art Ducko is the University of Oregon's official comics magazine, established in the fall of 2014 for students to publish original comics. It publishes a quarterly magazine and posts content on its website.

=== The Ecotone ===
The Ecotone is an annual publication created by the graduate students of the Environmental Studies Program at UO.

=== Ethos Magazine ===
Ethos Magazine, formerly an independent publication, is a subsidiary of Daily Emerald and the Emerald Media news division. Originally Korean Ducks magazine (after the school sports team name), which focused on Korean culture, it has since developed a multicultural character.

=== Flux ===
Flux is an annual magazine written and edited by students of the University of Oregon School of Journalism and Communication. It contains in-depth features about a wide variety of topics, many of which are based in the Pacific Northwest but have national appeal and interest.

=== Global Talk ===
Global Talk, a student-created news publication, includes one page each for Chinese, French, Dutch, Persian, German, Italian, Japanese, Russian, Scandinavian, Slavic, Swahili, Portuguese, Spanish, and other minor languages unrepresented by major departments. Global Talk is funded by several departments at the UO and was founded in November 2005. It is the first university of Oregon multilingual publication published within the university system and within the state of Oregon.

=== Oregon Voice ===
Oregon Voice primarily chronicles popular culture in a zine format. The Voice often profiles music acts as they tour through Eugene.

=== The Siren ===
The Siren is a feminist magazine produced by the Women's Center.

=== Student Insurgent ===
The Student Insurgent is a journal of radical politics published by a collective of students and community members. The paper's coverage shifts periodically, but has covered anti-capitalist, radical environmentalist, and anti-war topics. The Insurgent has expressed solidarity with such groups as the Animal Liberation Front and the Earth First! organization. It has also rallied for the release of Mumia Abu-Jamal and Jeff Luers, a local eco-anarchist whose 22-year arson sentence was later overturned on the grounds that it was excessive, as well as other imprisoned radical-left voices, often claiming that they are wrongly held political prisoners.

Student Insurgent printed "The Jesus Issue", featuring commentary on Christianity and cartoons of Jesus, including "Jesus with erection", in response to the Jyllands-Posten Muhammad cartoons controversy. Bill O'Reilly called for the firing of university president David B. Frohnmayer and invited members of the Insurgent and the Commentator onto the O'Reilly Factor, but only Commentator staff accepted.

== Radio ==
Under the Associated Students, the University of Oregon operates two radio stations on campus.

=== KWAX ===
KWAX is a non-commercial classical music radio station in Eugene, Oregon, broadcasting to the Eugene-Springfield, Oregon area. The station is a listener supported service of the University of Oregon.

=== KWVA ===
KWVA is a college radio station broadcasting from the EMU building on the University of Oregon campus in Eugene, Oregon, United States. Licensed to the University of Oregon, it serves the Eugene/Springfield metropolitan area and has a live online stream.

== Television & Film ==
=== DuckTV ===
DuckTV is the University of Oregon's only student-run television network. Weekly episodes feature news, sports, comedy, and dramatic shows.

=== University Film Organization ===
The University Film Organization (UFO) is a student-run collective of filmmakers that produces short films as well as hosting educational events and workshops. UFO also hosts an annual film festival on campus.

== Non-student-run media ==
=== Oregon Quarterly ===
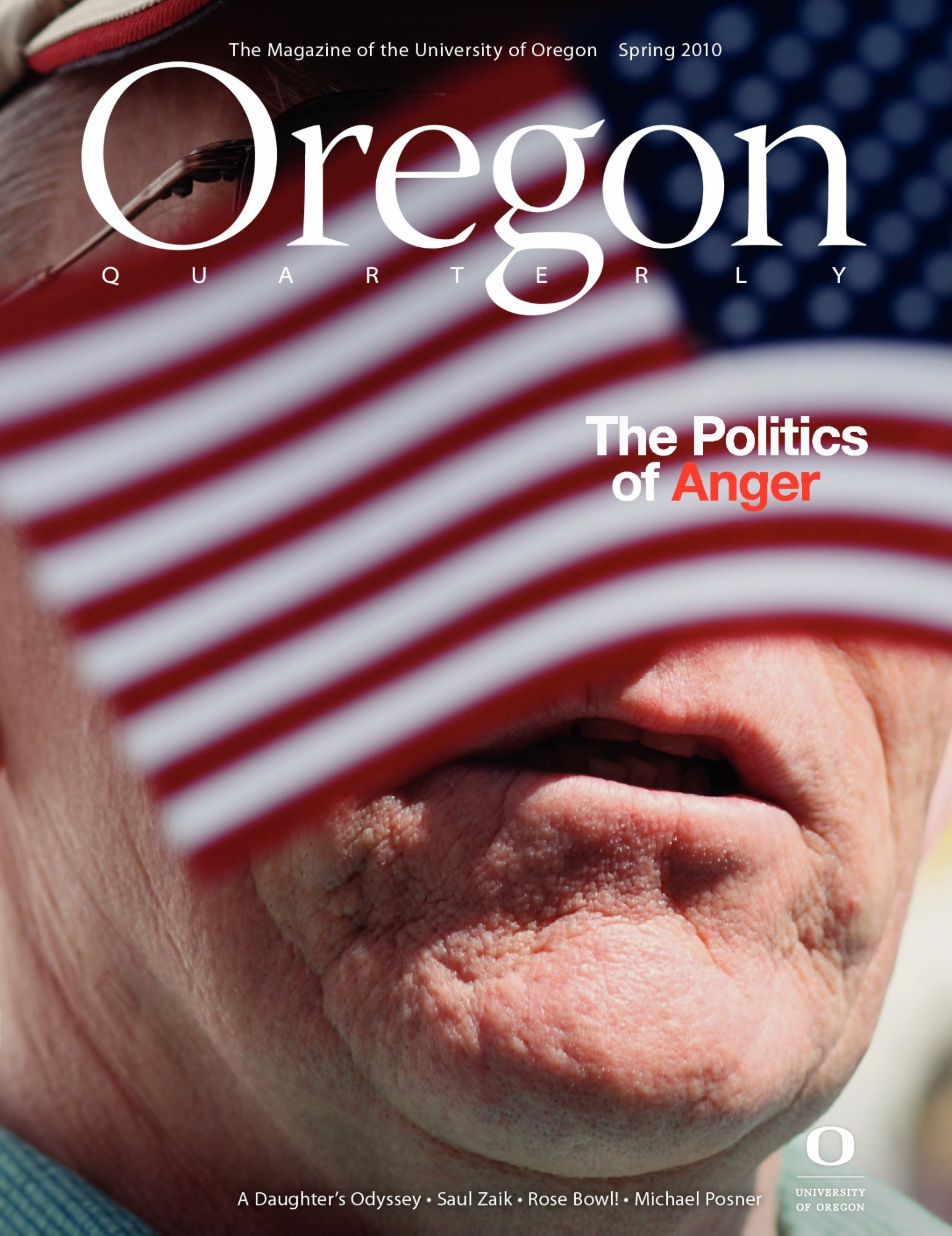
The Spring 2010 issue of Oregon Quarterly

The Oregon Quarterly is an alumni magazine published by the university. The magazine was started in 1919 as Old Oregon.

According to the website:

Oregon Quarterly is the magazine of the University of Oregon. Four times a year, we present the diversity of ideas and people associated with the University, Oregon, and the Northwest. Just as the University of Oregon is a state and regional center for learning, teaching, research, and service, Oregon Quarterly is a state and regional magazine of good writing and important ideas.

=== University of Oregon Press ===
The University of Oregon Press publishes books, which, since June 1, 2005, have been distributed by the Oregon State University Press.

=== Center for Media and Educational Technologies ===
The Center for Media and Educational Technologies (CMET) streams video productions to promote the physical and virtual learning environments at the University of Oregon.

=== AroundtheO ===
AroundtheO provides news and information pertaining to university affairs.

=== UOMatters ===
UOMatters is a watchdog blog covering events affecting the University of Oregon.

== Defunct media ==
=== The Comic Press ===
The Comic Press – originally known as The Weekly Enema – was a semi-monthly newspaper written and edited by students at the University of Oregon from 2008 – 2009. Its mission was to "provoke intelligent thought and discussion through humor." It republished a number of webcomics and contained topical and humorous features about a wide variety of campus topics.

=== Daily Jade ===
Daily Jade was an independent satirical news website launched on November 18, 2013 and defunct as of February 9, 2015. Operating at the URL "dailyjade.com", it published articles lampooning current events surrounding the University of Oregon, the city of Eugene, and university life in general.

=== Northwest Review ===
The tri-annual Northwest Review journal of literature was published for over 50 years up to 2011. In 2020, it resumed publication with a new editor in chief, S. Tremaine Nelson.

=== Oregon Commentator ===
Oregon Commentator was a journal of opinion and humor founded on September 27, 1983, making it the second-oldest publication on campus after the Daily Emerald. Modeled in equal parts after such publications as Harvard Lampoon and Reason Magazine, the Commentator was primarily known for libertarian and conservative stances and served as a contrarian outlet for students resistant to the political atmosphere on campus.
