= FN 303 =

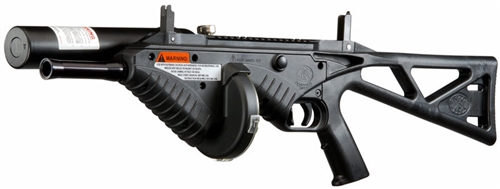
- A FN 303 anti-riot gun.
- Type: Riot gun
- Place of origin: Belgium

Service history
- Used by: See Users
- Wars: War in Afghanistan (2001-2021); Iraq War; Libyan Revolution; 2013 Lahad Datu standoff

Production history
- Manufacturer: FN Herstal
- Produced: 2003–present

Specifications
- Mass: 2.3 kg (5.07 lb)
- Length: 740 mm (29.1 in)
- Barrel length: 250 mm (9.8 in)
- Caliber: 17.3 mm (0.68 in)
- Action: Compressed air
- Muzzle velocity: 85 m/s (279 ft/s)
- Effective firing range: 70 m (77 yd)
- Feed system: 15-round detachable drum magazine
- Sights: Front blade, rear notch

The FN 303 is a semi-automatic less-lethal riot gun designed and manufactured by FN Herstal.

The FN 303 uses compressed air to fire projectiles from a 15-round drum magazine. It is designed to incapacitate the target through blunt trauma without causing critical injuries, and is most widely used for riot control and other kinds of combat where lethal weapons should be avoided.

The 303 can be fired from the shoulder using adjustable iron sights, or it can be mounted in an under-barrel configuration on most assault rifles when its stock assembly is removed (in this configuration, it is designated M303). It also comes with a top-mounted Picatinny rail that can fit most commercial weapon accessories, such as telescopic sights, laser sights and tactical lights. FN markets its own set of accessories for the launcher, including tactical vests, slings, carrying bags, and gas compressors. It is accurate at distances up to 35 metres (38 yd).

FN also produce a pistol variant, the FN 303-P, in the same caliber, using a seven-round magazine with a self-contained gas cartridge.

== History ==
The FN 303 is based on a project by the Monterey Bay Corporation designated the XM303. The development team consisted of designers and researchers from two paintball related design and manufacturing firms, including Airgun Designs. The prototype was named the UBTPS, Under Barrel Tactical Paintball System.

The design could be attached to an M16 rifle and was conceived as a less-than-lethal weapon system coupled with a lethal weapon system, providing a wide range of response capabilities that were immediately available. A stand-alone version was also developed.

The UBTPS also featured a rotating barrel magazine, allowing for a wide range of different projectiles to be available and selectable without the need to change magazines.

Also developed was a bismuth-weighted projectile to provide the necessary mass, allowing the UTPBS to achieve the engagement range requirements.

== Use ==
In March 2003, Swiss police in Geneva, Switzerland utilized the weapon during protests against the World Trade Organization. Union organizer Denise Chervet was shot in the head, permanently lodging remnant shards in her body. The incident triggered public outcry and lead to the cantons of Geneva and Zurich ending its use.

In October 2004, in Boston, Massachusetts, US, Victoria Snelgrove was struck in the eye by an FN 303 round fired by a member of the Boston Police Department (BPD), leading to her death approximately 12 hours later. An autopsy found that the pellet opened a three-quarter-inch (1.9 cm) hole in the bone behind the eye, broke into nine pieces, and damaged the right side of her brain. Subsequent tests by the BPD indicated that the FN 303's accuracy "decreased significantly" after about 300 firings. This is circumstantially corroborated by testimony of the officer who fired the weapon, stating that he was aiming at a rioter throwing bottles and did not know that a bystander had been hit. A $15 million wrongful death lawsuit against the City of Boston and FN Herstal was settled in July 2006. In 2007, the BPD destroyed their remaining FN 303s, stating they were more powerful and lethal than had been anticipated.

During protests in front of the Arcelor building in Luxembourg city on 11 May 2009, the weapon was used for the first time by local police. An RTL cameraman was hit in the hand, breaking one finger.

On 2 June 2013, during Gezi Park protests in Ankara, Turkey, a protester was wounded in the face by a "plastic bullet", later attributed to police use of the FN 303.

During Independence Day demonstrations in Finland on 6 December 2015, police used FN 303 against counter-protesters, with one receiving eye injuries from projectile fragments.

A 2019 study found that the performance of the FN 303 was significantly worse outside of a laboratory setting. Operational conditions were simulated by inducing physiological and psychological stress, and measuring salivary cortisol; accuracy and reported ease of use were both lower than that of the control group.

During George Floyd protests in 2020, at least 4 people were seriously injured by FN 303s in the United States. Between June 2025 and May 2026, over 6 people were seriously injured by FN 303s in the United States. In September 2025, the United States Department of Homeland Security purchased $1 million of FN303 launchers and projectiles.

== Users ==
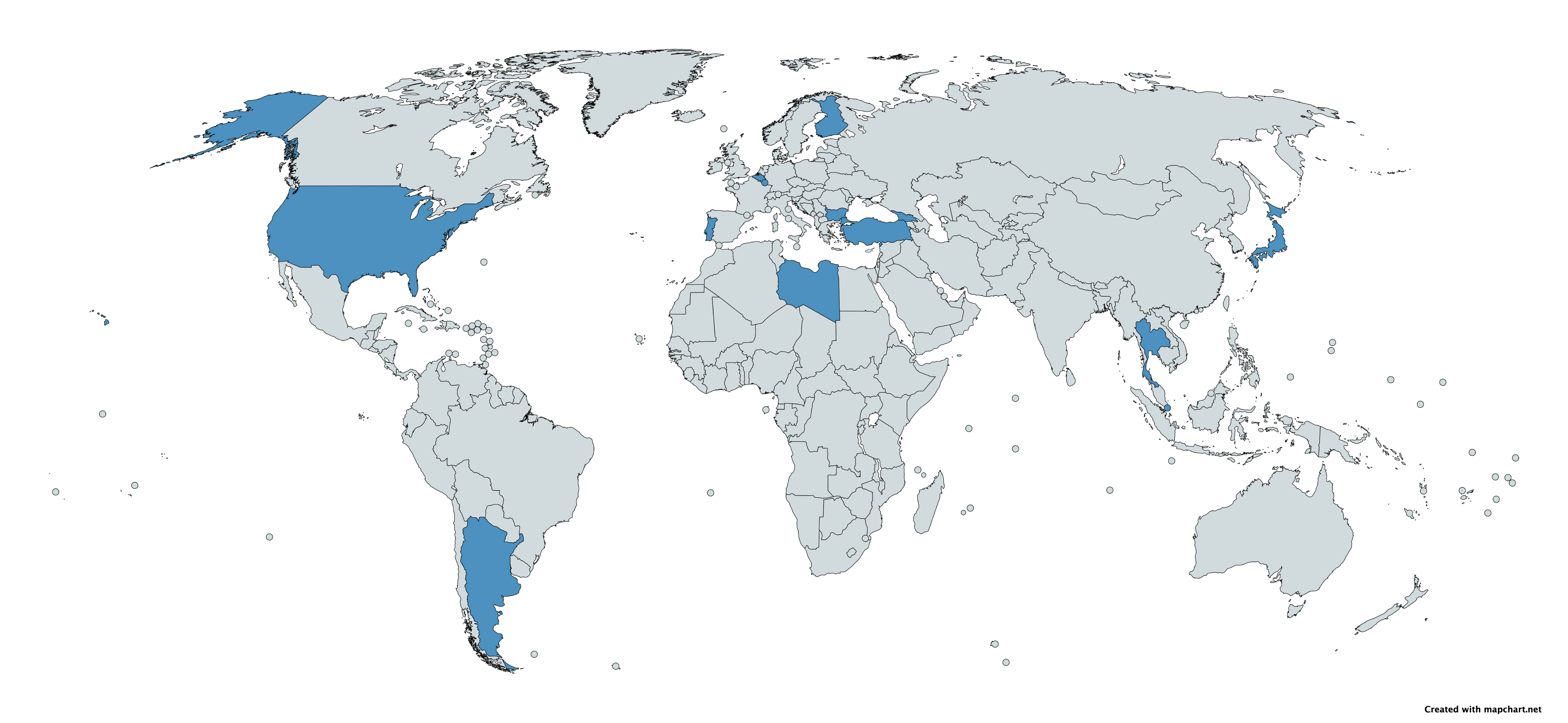
A map with FN 303 users in blue

- Argentina: Used by the Buenos Aires City Police.
- Belgium: DSU counter-terrorism group, Police de Liège (PAB), Antwerp local police.
- Bulgaria: In use with the Land Forces and the Military Police.
- Georgia: In service with the Ministry of Internal Affairs. Used twice—once as a defensive weapon when protesters illegally entered a police station, and once during riots in November 2007.
- Finland: Used by the Police of Finland. First use by the police against the antifa demonstration Vapaus pelissä on 6 December 2015, hitting one person in the eye.
- Japan: Used by some Special Investigation Teams, including that of the Aichi Prefectural Police.
- Libya: Purchased 2,000 launchers in 2009.
- Luxembourg: Unité Spéciale de la Police of the Grand Ducal Police.
- Netherlands: One launcher purchased by the Gelderland Province for use by their rangers to repel wolves in De Hoge Veluwe National Park.
- Portugal: 200 launchers purchased in 2018 by the Polícia de Segurança Pública.
- Singapore: In use by the Singapore Police Coast Guard's Special Task Squadron
- Switzerland: Used by the Swiss police. No longer in use as of 2026.
- Thailand: Used by the Protection and Crowds Control Division under the Metropolitan Police Bureau, Royal Thai Police in September 2021.
- Turkey: Çevik Kuvvet of the General Directorate of Security.
- United States: Used by the U.S. Army, U.S. Navy, U.S. Marine Corps, U.S. Coast Guard, U.S. Air Force, and Customs and Border Protection, Federal Protective Service, Department of Homeland Security. Also used by the U.S. Customs and Border Protection, Alameda County Sheriff's Office, Los Angeles Police Department, and the Portland Police Bureau.
