= Cris Mazza =

American writer

Cris Mazza is an American novelist, short story writer, and non-fiction author. She is known for her 2013 memoir, Something Wrong With Her, which was adapted into a film.

== Early life and education ==
A native of Southern California, Cris Mazza earned her Bachelor of Arts and Master of Arts degrees from San Diego State University and her Master of Fine Arts in writing at Brooklyn College.

== Career ==
=== Writing ===
Mazza has published 10 novels, six collections, and two memoirs. She is widely anthologized as an example of post-feminist, formalist, or contemporary experimental fiction. Her work often deals with second and third-wave feminist concerns as well as sexuality.

Along with Jeffrey DeShell, Mazza used the term "chick lit" for the edited anthology Chick Lit Postfeminist Fiction (1995) and the follow-up anthology Chick Lit 2: No Chick Vics (1996). While originally meant to be ironic, the term was co-opted to define a very different sort of work. In 2007, Gretchen Kalwinsky of Time Out Chicago called Mazza "an award-winning author who has waged a one-woman war against the chick-lit genre".

During a 2014 interview with Rain Taxi, Mazza termed her 2013 memoir, Something Wrong With Her a "meta-memoir". The memoir explores sexual dysfunction.

In 2016, Mazza co-produced and starred in the independent film, Anorgasmia. Based on her memoir, Something Wrong With Her, the film continues the struggles of sexual frustration felt by Mazza. Despite acting as a fictional sequel to the memoir, the film continues with the memoir's themes, exploring the conflicts and anxieties of sexual frustration.

=== Teaching ===
Mazza has directed the Program for Writers at the University of Illinois at Chicago.

== Other activities ==
In 2020, Mazza was asked to be the finalist judge for the Leapfrog Press Global Fiction Prize Contest. She selected Molly Giles's short story collection Wife with Knife as the winner.

== Awards and honors ==
Mazza won the PEN / Nelson Algren Award for her novel How to Leave a Country.

In addition, Mazza received an &NOW award in 2009 for her story "Trickle-Down Timeline," published in The &NOW Awards: The Best Innovative Writing in 2009.

== Works ==
Published Writing:

- Animal Acts (FC2, 1988)
- Is It Sexual Harassment Yet? (FC2, 1991)
- How to Leave a Country: a novel (1992)
- Revelation Countdown (FC2, 1993)
- Dog People: a novel (1997)
- Former Virgin (FC2, 1997)
- Girl Beside Him (FC2, 2001)
- Indigenous: Growing up Californian (City Lights, 2003)
- Homeland (Red Hen Press, 2004)
- Disability (FC2, 2005)
- Many Ways to Get It, Many Ways to Say It (Chiasmus Press, 2005)
- Waterbaby (Soft Skull Press, 2007)
- Various Men Who Knew Us as Girls (Emergency Press, 2011)
- Something Wrong With Her (memoir, 2013)

Film:

- Anorgasmia (independent film, 2016)
