= Oregon State University Press =

Pacific Northwest USA Academic Book Publisher

- Parent company: Oregon State University
- Founded: 1961
- Country of origin: United States
- Headquarters location: Corvallis, Oregon
- Distribution: Chicago Distribution Center (US); UBC Press (Canada); East-West Export Books (Asia Pacific); Eurospan Group (EMEA)
- Publication types: Books
- Official website: osupress.oregonstate.edu

Oregon State University Press, or OSU Press, founded in 1961, is a university press that publishes roughly 15 titles per year and is part of Oregon State University. The only academic publisher in Oregon, the press produces works related to the Pacific Northwest, particularly the history, natural history, cultures, and literature of the region or environmental history and natural resource issues.

Notable titles from OSU Press include Rian Dundon’s Protest City: Portland's Summer of Rage, which was reviewed in the New Yorker and Jeff Mapes's Pedaling Revolution: How Cyclists Are Changing American Cities, which was reviewed in the New York Times.

Since June 1, 2005 OSU Press has distributed the books published by University of Oregon Press.

== See also ==
- List of English-language book publishing companies
- List of university presses
