= 2016 in literature =

This article contains information about the literary events and publications of 2016.

== Events ==
- March 11 – Jean Martin's The Raped Little Runaway becomes the first book since 1998 to be banned in the Republic of Ireland by its Censorship of Publications Board, being deemed "indecent or obscene" on account of repeated reference to child rape.
- May 20 – Writers who sign a letter calling for the United Kingdom to remain in the European Union include Hilary Mantel, John le Carré, Philip Pullman and Tom Stoppard; nevertheless, the June 2016 United Kingdom European Union membership referendum endorses Brexit.
- May 24 – Hundreds of US writers, including Stephen King, Robert Polito and Nicole Krauss, sign an "open letter to the American people" urging them not to support Donald Trump as a presidential candidate in the November 2016 United States presidential election.

== Anniversaries ==
- January 10 – Fiftieth anniversary of the publication of Truman Capote's In Cold Blood
- February 1 – 20th anniversary of the publication of David Foster Wallace's Infinite Jest.
- February 22 – 40th anniversary of the publication of Raymond Carver's Will You Please Be Quiet, Please?
- February 28 – Centenary of Henry James's death in 1916
- March 28 – 75th anniversary of the death of Virginia Woolf in 1941
- April 3 – 25th anniversary of Graham Greene's death in 1991
- April 12 – Centenary of the birth of Beverly Cleary, American children's author
- May 21 – Centenary of the birth of Harold Robbins, American novelist dubbed one of "the world's bestselling authors."
- May 28 – Centenary of the birth of Walker Percy, National Book Award-winning American novelist (The Moviegoer, published 55 years ago in 1961)
- April 21 – Bicentenary of Charlotte Brontë's birth in 1816
- April 22 – 400th anniversary of the death of Miguel de Cervantes.
- April 23 – Possible 400th anniversary of Shakespeare's death
- April 24 – Centenary of the Easter Rising in Dublin, which inspired W. B. Yeats's poem "Easter, 1916"
- July 1 – Centenary of the first day of the Battle of the Somme, in which those fighting included Robert Graves, Ford Madox Ford and JRR Tolkien
- July 14 – Centenary of the birth of Natalia Ginzburg, Italian author
- September 13 – Centenary of the birth of Roald Dahl, Welsh-born children's author
- September 17 – Centenary of the birth of Mary Stewart (Mary Rainbow), English romantic suspense novelist
- September 28 – Fiftieth anniversary of the death of André Breton, French poet, essayist and theorist; the leading exponent of Surrealism in literature
- October 3 – Centenary of the birth of James Herriot (James Alfred Wight), English writer and veterinary surgeon
- October 22 – 90 years ago, Ernest Hemingway's novel The Sun Also Rises is published in a first edition consisting of 5090 copies, selling at $2.00 per copy
- December 14 – Centenary of the birth of Shirley Jackson, American novelist and short story writer
- December 29 – Centenary of the publication in book form of A Portrait of the Artist as a Young Man by James Joyce, in New York

== New books ==
The date after each title indicate the U.S. publication date, unless otherwise stated.

=== Fiction ===
- Naomi Alderman – The Power (UK, October)
- Mohammed Hasan Alwan – A Small Death (موت صغير, Lebanon, May)
- Fernando Aramburu – Patria (Spain)
- Anuk Arudpragasam – The Story of a Brief Marriage (UK)
- Margaret Atwood – Hag-Seed (October)
- Sebastian Barry – Days Without End (October)
- Gary Barwin – Yiddish for Pirates (April 8)
- Mike Binder – Keep Calm (February 2)
- Pierce Brown – Morning Star (February 9)
- Taylor Brown – Fallen Land (January 12)
- Graeme Macrae Burnet – His Bloody Project (UK)
- Catherine Chidgey – The Wish Child (New Zealand, November 1)
- Marcia Clark – Blood Defense (May 1)
- J. M. Coetzee – The Schooldays of Jesus (UK, September 27)
- Jean-Baptiste Del Amo – Règne animal (France, August 18)
- Emma Donoghue – The Wonder (September)
- Paul Goldberg – The Yid (February 2)
- Linda Grant – The Dark Circle (UK only, November 3)
- Mark Greaney – Back Blast
- Yaa Gyasi – Homegoing
- Michael Helm – After James (September 13)
- Brian Herbert and Kevin J. Anderson – Navigators of Dune (September 13)
- Vigdis Hjorth – Arv og miljø (Wills and Testaments, Norway)
- Anosh Irani – The Parcel
- Philip Kerr – The Other Side of Silence
- Alexandra Kleeman – Intimations: Stories (September 13)
- Christian Kracht – The Dead (Die Toten, Germany, September 8)
- László Krasznahorkai – Baron Wenckheim's Homecoming (Báró Wenckheim hazatér, Hungary, September)
- Shari Lapena – The Couple Next Door
- Deborah Levy – Hot Milk (UK, March 24)
- Édouard Louis – Histoire de la violence (History of Violence, France, January 7)
- Mike McCormack – Solar Bones (UK, May 5)
- Elizabeth McKenzie – The Portable Veblen
- C. E. Morgan – The Sport of Kings
- Sayaka Murata – Convenience Store Woman (コンビニ人間, Konbini ningen, Japan, July 27)
- Maggie O'Farrell – This Must Be the Place (UK, May 17)
- Chibundu Onuzo – Welcome to Lagos (UK)
- Stef Penney – Under A Pole Start
- Sarah Perry – The Essex Serpent (UK, May 27)
- Kerry Lee Powell – Willem de Kooning's Paintbrush
- Christoph Ransmayr – Cox
- David Adams Richards – Principles to Live By
- Steven Rowley – Lily and the Octopus (June 7)
- Leila Segal – Breathe: Stories from Cuba
- Joss Sheldon – The Little Voice (UK, November 23)
- Leïla Slimani – Chanson douce (France, August 18, translated as Lullaby or The Perfect Nanny)
- Ali Smith – Autumn (UK, October 20)
- Zadie Smith – Swing Time
- Botho Strauß – Oniritti Höhlenbilder (Germany, October 10)
- David Szalay – All That Man Is (linked short stories, UK, April 7)
- Yasuko Thanh – Mysterious Fragrance of the Yellow Mountains (Canada)
- Madeleine Thien – Do Not Say We Have Nothing (October 11)
- Rose Tremain – The Gustav Sonata (UK, May 19)
- Katherena Vermette – The Break (Canada)
- Colson Whitehead – The Underground Railroad
- Zoe Whittall – The Best Kind of People (August 27)
- Corrina Wycoff – Damascus House (May 25)

=== Children and young people ===
- Jeanne-Marie Leprince de Beaumont (with Mahlon F. Craft and Kinuko Y. Craft) – Beauty and the Beast (La Belle et la Bête)
- Jo Ellen Bogart – The White Cat and the Monk
- Paula Bossio – The Pencil (original El Lapiz, 2011)
- Peter Brown – The Wild Robot
- Maxine Beneba Clarke – The Patchwork Bike
- Brian Conaghan – The Bombs that Brought Us Together
- Mem Fox and Judy Horacek – Ducks Away!
- Denise Fleming – 5 Little Ducks
- Jory John and Lane Smith – Penguin Problems
- Dav Pilkey – Dog Man (first in the eponymous series of 10 books)
- J. Patrick Lewis (with Gary Kelley) – The Navajo Code Talkers
- Sophie Piper (with Anne Yvonne Gilbert) – Jesus is Born
- Dave Rudden – Knights of the Borrowed Dark
- Francesca Simon – The Monstrous Child
- Maggie Stiefvater – The Raven King (last book in The Raven Cycle series)
- Jacqueline Wilson – Rent a Bridesmaid
- Toni Yuly – Cat Nap (Yuly book)

=== Poetry ===
- Matthew and Michael Dickman – Brother
- Alice Oswald – Falling Awake
- Jacob Polley – Jackself

=== Drama ===
- Caryl Churchill
  - Escaped Alone (UK, 20 January)
  - Pigs And Dogs (UK, 21 July)
- Martyna Majok – Cost of Living
- Suman Pokhrel – Yajnaseni
- J. T. Rogers – Oslo (June)
- Zlatko Topčić – Silvertown
- Alex Vickery-Howe – Out of the Ordinary

=== Non-fiction ===
- Jimmy Barnes – Working Class Boy
- Daniel Beer – The House of the Dead: Siberian Exile Under the Tsars (UK)
- Paul Cartledge – Democracy: A Life (UK, March 24)
- Nicholas Crane – The Making of the British Landscape: From the Ice Age to the Present
- Daisy Deomampo – Transnational Reproduction
- Tim Elliott – Farewell to the Father
- Susan Faludi – In the Darkroom (June 14)
- Christopher Goscha – The Penguin History of Vietnam
- John Guy – Elizabeth: The Forgotten Years (UK, May 5)
- Jock Haswell (with John Lewis-Stempel) – A Brief History of the British Army (UK, May 26)
- Gareth Stedman Jones – Karl Marx: Greatness and Illusion (UK, August)
- Daniel Levitin – A Field Guide to Lies: Critical Thinking in the Information Age
- John Lewis-Stempel
  - The Running Hare: The Secret Life of Farmland (UK, June 20)
  - Where Poppies Blow: The British Soldier, Nature, The Great War (UK)
- John McWhorter – Words on the Move: Why English Won't – and Can't – Sit Still (Like, Literally)
- Rajiv Malhotra
  - Academic Hinduphobia
  - Battle for Sanskrit
- Hisham Matar – The Return (UK, June 30)
- Helaine Olen and Harold Pollack – The Index Card (January 5)
- Patrick Phillips – Blood at the Root
- John Preston – A Very English Scandal (UK, May 5)
- Kyle Schwartz - I Wish My Teacher Knew
- Chris Smith – The Daily Show (The Book)
- Kassia St. Clair – The Secret Lives of Colour
- JD Vance - Hillbilly Elegy
- Gary Younge – Another Day in the Death of America

== Deaths ==
Birth years link to the corresponding "[year] in literature" article:

- January 11 – Gunnel Vallquist, Swedish writer and translator (born 1918)
- January 18 – Michel Tournier, French writer, 91 (born 1924)
- January 20 – David G. Hartwell, American anthologist, author and critic (b. 1941)
- February 8 – Margaret Forster, English novelist and biographer, 77 (born 1938)
- February 18 – Yūko Tsushima (津島 佑子), Japanese author, 68 (born 1947)
- February 19
  - Umberto Eco – Italian philosopher and novelist (The Name of the Rose), 84 (born 1932)
  - Harper Lee – American author (To Kill a Mockingbird), 89 (born 1926)
- February 29 – Louise Rennison, English author and comedian (born 1951)
- March 1 – Carole Achache, French writer, photographer and actress, 63, (born 1952)
- March 4 – Pat Conroy, American novelist (The Prince of Tides), 70 (born 1945)
- March 8 - Enrique Estrázulas, Uruguayan writer, poet, essayist, playwright, journalist and diplomat, 74 (born 1942)
- March 21 – Tomás de Mattos, Uruguayan writer and librarian, 68 (born 1947)
- March 31 – Imre Kertész, Hungarian writer and the 2002 laureate of the Nobel Prize in Literature, 86 (born 1929)
- April 3 – Lars Gustafsson, Swedish writer and scholar, novelist and poet, 79 (born 1936)
- April 5 – E. M. Nathanson, American author (The Dirty Dozen), 87 (born 1928)
- April 12 – Sir Arnold Wesker, English dramatist, 83 (born 1932)
- April 30 – Daniel Berrigan, American Jesuit priest, poet, peace activist and recidivist, won the 1957 Lamont Prize in Poetry, 94 (born 1921)
- June 6 – Sir Peter Shaffer, English playwright (Amadeus), 90 (born 1926)
- June 25 – Adam Small, 79, South African writer and poet, winner of the Hertzog Prize (born 1936)
- June 30 – Sir Geoffrey Hill, English poet, 84 (born 1932)
- July 1 – Yves Bonnefoy, French poet, 93 (born 1923)
- July 2 – Elie Wiesel, American Jewish author (Night) and 1986 Nobel Peace Prize winner (born 1928)
- July 14 – Péter Esterházy, Hungarian writer, 66 (born 1950)
- July 19 – Carlos Gorostiza, Argentine playwright, theatre director and novelist, 96 (born 1920)
- August 24 – Michel Butor, French essayist, novelist, critic and a leading figure of 1950s Nouveau Roman group, 89 (born 1926)
- September 4 :
  - Isidore Okpewho, Nigerian novelist and critic, 74 (born 1941)
  - Cyril C. Perera, Sri Lankan author and translator, 93 (born 1923)
- September 16
  - Edward Albee, American playwright (Who's Afraid of Virginia Woolf?), 88 (born 1928)
  - W. P. Kinsella, Canadian author (Shoeless Joe), 81 (born 1935)
- September 28 – Gloria Naylor, African-American novelist and academic (The Women of Brewster Place), 66, (born 1950)
- October 13 – Dario Fo, Italian playwright and the 1997 laureate of the Nobel Prize in Literature, 90 (born 1926)
- October 31 – Natalie Babbitt, American author (Tuck Everlasting), 84 (born 1932)
- November 7 – Leonard Cohen, Canadian poet, novelist and songwriter, 82 (born 1934)
- November 10 – Francisco Nieva, Spanish playwright, novelist and short story writer, 91 (born 1924)
- November 11 – Sir James McNeish, New Zealand novelist, playwright and biographer, 85 (born 1931)
- November 20 – William Trevor, Irish novelist, playwright and short story writer, 88 (born 1928)
- December 12 – Shirley Hazzard, Australian novelist and short story writer, 85 (born 1931)
- December 24 – Richard Adams, English author (Watership Down), 96 (born 1920)
- December 28 – Michel Déon, French novelist, 97 (born 1919)

== Awards ==
In alphabetical order of prize names:

- Anisfield-Wolf Book Award: Mary Morris, The Jazz Palace
- Baileys Women's Prize for Fiction: Lisa McInerney, The Glorious Heresies
- Baillie Gifford Prize: Philippe Sands, East West Street
- Booker Prize: Paul Beatty, The Sellout (first American winner)
- Caine Prize for African Writing: Lidudumalingani Mqombothi, "Memories We Lost"
- Camões Prize: Raduan Nassar
- Costa Book Awards: Sebastian Barry, Days Without End (novel and overall winner); Francis Spufford, Golden Hill (first novel); Alice Oswald, Falling Awake (poetry); Keggie Carew, Dadland (biography); Brian Conaghan, The Bombs that Brought us Together (children's)
- Danuta Gleed Literary Award: Heather O'Neill, Daydreams of Angels
- Dayne Ogilvie Prize: Leah Horlick
- Desmond Elliott Prize: Lisa McInerney, The Glorious Heresies
- DSC Prize for South Asian Literature: Sleeping on Jupiter by Anuradha Roy, India
- Dylan Thomas Prize: Max Porter, Grief is the Thing with Feathers
- European Book Prize: Javier Cercas, The Impostor and, Erri De Luca, Le Plus et le Moins
- Folio Prize: No prize awarded
- Friedenspreis des Deutschen Buchhandels: Carolin Emcke
- German Book Prize: Bodo Kirchhoff, Widerfahrnis
- Goldsmiths Prize: Mike McCormack, Solar Bones
- Gordon Burn Prize: David Szalay, All That Man Is
- Governor General's Award for English-language fiction: Madeleine Thien, Do Not Say We Have Nothing
- Governor General's Award for French-language fiction: Dominique Fortier, Au péril de la mer
- Governor General's Awards, other categories: See 2016 Governor General's Awards.
- Grand Prix du roman de l'Académie française: Adélaïde de Clermont-Tonnerre Le Dernier des nôtres
- International Booker Prize: Han Kang, The Vegetarian
- International Dublin Literary Award: Family Life by Akhil Sharma
- International Prize for Arabic Fiction: Rabai al-Madhoun, Destinies: Concerto of the Holocaust and the Naqba
- James Tait Black Memorial Prize for Fiction: Eimear McBride, The Lesser Bohemians
- James Tait Black Memorial Prize for Biography: Laura Cumming, The Vanishing Man
- Kerry Group Irish Fiction Award: Anne Enright, The Green Road
- Lambda Literary Awards: Multiple categories; see 28th Lambda Literary Awards.
- Miguel de Cervantes Prize: Eduardo Mendoza
- Miles Franklin Award: A. S. Patrić, Black Rock White City
- National Biography Award: Brenda Niall, Mannix
- National Book Award for Fiction: Colson Whitehead, The Underground Railroad
- National Book Critics Circle Award: Louise Erdrich, LaRose
- Nike Award: Bronka Nowicka, Nakarmić kamień
- Nobel Prize in Literature: Bob Dylan
- PEN/Faulkner Award for Fiction: James Hannaham, Delicious Foods
- PEN Center USA Fiction Award:
- Premio Planeta de Novela: Dolores Redondo, Todo esto te daré
- Premio Strega: Edoardo Albinati, La scuola cattolica
- Pritzker Literature Award for Lifetime Achievement in Military Writing: Hew Strachan
- Prix Goncourt: Leïla Slimani, Chanson douce
- Pulitzer Prize for Fiction: Viet Thanh Nguyen, The Sympathizer
- Pulitzer Prize for Poetry: Peter Balakian, Ozone Journal
- RBC Taylor Prize: Rosemary Sullivan, Stalin's Daughter: The Extraordinary and Tumultuous Life of Svetlana Alliluyeva
- Rogers Writers' Trust Fiction Prize: Yasuko Thanh, Mysterious Fragrance of the Yellow Mountains
- Russian Booker Prize: Peter Aleshkovsky, «Крепость» (The Citadel)
- Scotiabank Giller Prize: Madeleine Thien, Do Not Say We Have Nothing
- Golden Wreath of Struga Poetry Evenings: Margaret Atwood (Canada)
- Walter Scott Prize: Simon Mawer, Tightrope
- Wilfred Owen Poetry Award: Carol Ann Duffy (UK)
- W. Y. Boyd Literary Award for Excellence in Military Fiction: Ralph Peters, Valley of the Shadow
- Zbigniew Herbert International Literary Award: Lars Gustafsson

== Notes ==
- Information on the literary calendar at Books in 2016: a literary calendar |Books |The Guardian
