= Rae Howells =

Welsh writer

- Occupation: Writer
- Writing career
- Genre: Poetry
- Notable work: The language of bees (2022)
- Website: www.raehowells.co.uk

Rae Howells is a Welsh writer. Her debut poetry collection The language of bees was shortlisted for the Wales Book of the Year award in 2023.

== Career ==
In 2017, Howells' poem 'Airlings' won the Welsh Poetry Competition. This win was followed by another prize the next year, when 'The Winter-King' took first place in The Rialto's Nature Poetry Competition. Both of these poems would eventually appear in Howells' first full collection The language of bees, published by Parthian Books in April 2022. In May 2023, The language of bees was shortlisted for the Wales Book of the Year award, with the shortlisting announced on BBC Radio Wales.

Howells' second poetry collection, This Common Uncommon, was published by Parthian Books in May 2024. The collection centres upon West Cross Common, a threatened peat-based green space in Swansea. The collection emerged during the COVID-19 lockdowns, when Howells and her family discovered this neglected area, rich in biodiversity yet facing potential development into housing. Through her poems, Howells personifies the common, giving voice to its flora and fauna, and explores themes of environmental conservation and the human connection to nature. The work serves both as a celebration of this unique habitat and a call to protect such vital green spaces, with Howells active in a local campaign to preserve the common from development.

Howells also regularly works in collaboration with other writers and artists. Prior to her first full collection, she published Bloom & Bones: a collaborative poetry pamphlet with fellow Swansea poet Jean James. Presented as a 'poetry conversation through colour' and inspired by The Secret Lives of Colour by Kassia St Clair, the pamphlet contained twenty poems responding to ten colours: white, yellow, orange, pink, red, purple, blue, green, brown and black. The pamphlet was published by Hedgehog Press, and launched at The Swansea Fringe festival on 24 October 2021. Later that year, Howells was selected as one of five Welsh women artists to take part in Ù Ơ: a virtual artistic residency linking artists from Wales and Vietnam.

== Bibliography ==
=== Poetry ===
- Bloom & Bones (with Jean James) (2021)
- The language of bees (2022)
- This Common Uncommon (2024)
