= Michael Hirsh (journalist) =

American journalist

Michael Hirsh (born 1957) is an American journalist. He is a columnist for Foreign Policy.

== Early life ==
He graduated magna cum laude from Tufts University in 1979 with a B.A. in philosophy. He took his graduate degree in international and public affairs at Columbia University.

== Career ==
He was the former national editor for Politico. He resigned from Politico on November 22, 2016, after publishing the home addresses of white nationalist Richard B. Spencer on Facebook. Hirsh called Spencer a Nazi after Spencer declared "Hail Trump!" and "Hail our people!" at a conference in Washington, D.C., declarations in response to which audience members performed Nazi salutes.

Hirsh is the former foreign editor, chief diplomatic correspondent, and national economic correspondent for Newsweek, as well as a former member of JournoList. He is a lecturer and has appeared numerous times as a commentator on Fox News, CNN, MSNBC, National Public Radio, and is a frequent guest of The Young Turks, a streaming internet political talk show. In addition to Newsweek, he has written for The Washington Post, Politico Magazine, The New York Times Book Review, The New York Review of Books, Foreign Affairs, Harper's, and Washington Monthly. Hirsh was co-winner of the Overseas Press Club award for best magazine reporting from abroad in 2001 for "prescience in identifying the al Qaeda threat half a year before the September 11 attacks" and for Newsweek's coverage of the war on terror, which also won a National Magazine Award. Hirsh also co-authored (with Rod Nordland) the November 3, 2003 cover story, "Bush's $87 Billion Mess," about the Iraq reconstruction plan, one of three issues that won Newsweek its second National Magazine Award for General Excellence in three years.

== Personal life ==
Hirsh lives in Northwest, Washington, D.C.

== Awards ==
- Deadline Club Award (1997).

For investigative reporting exposing IRS's abusive practices.

- Overseas Press Club Award (2001).

For best magazine reporting from abroad in Newsweek's coverage of terrorism.

- Ed Cunningham Award (2002), with others.

For best magazine reporting from abroad in Newsweek's coverage of terrorism.

- National Magazine Award.

For Newsweek's coverage of the war on terror.

== Publications ==
Hirsh's first book, At War with Ourselves: Why America Is Squandering Its Chance to Build a Better World, was described by Bill Keller in The New York Times as "well-informed, historically literate, nonideological common sense. That may sound like faint praise, but in an America that sometimes seems poised between reckless adventure and helpless inertia, centrist common sense is something to be treasured." In his second book, Capital Offense: How Washington's Wise Men Handed America's Future over to Wall Street, Hirsh argues that in the 2008 financial crisis, "otherwise intelligent and capable men like Greenspan, Rubin and Summers and later Hank Paulson and Tim Geithner permitted themselves to believe, in the face of a rising tide of contrary evidence, that markets are for the most part efficient and work well on their own." Michiko Kakutani of The New York Times called the book "provocative" and noted that while much of its content had previously been covered in books by other authors (namely Nouriel Roubini and Stephen Mihm together, David Wessel, Daniel Gross and Joseph E. Stiglitz), Hirsh still "does a highly informed, if decidedly opinionated, job of situating these developments within a historical context, and the book makes for useful and succinct reading".
