= Ronald Stade =

Swedish anthropologist

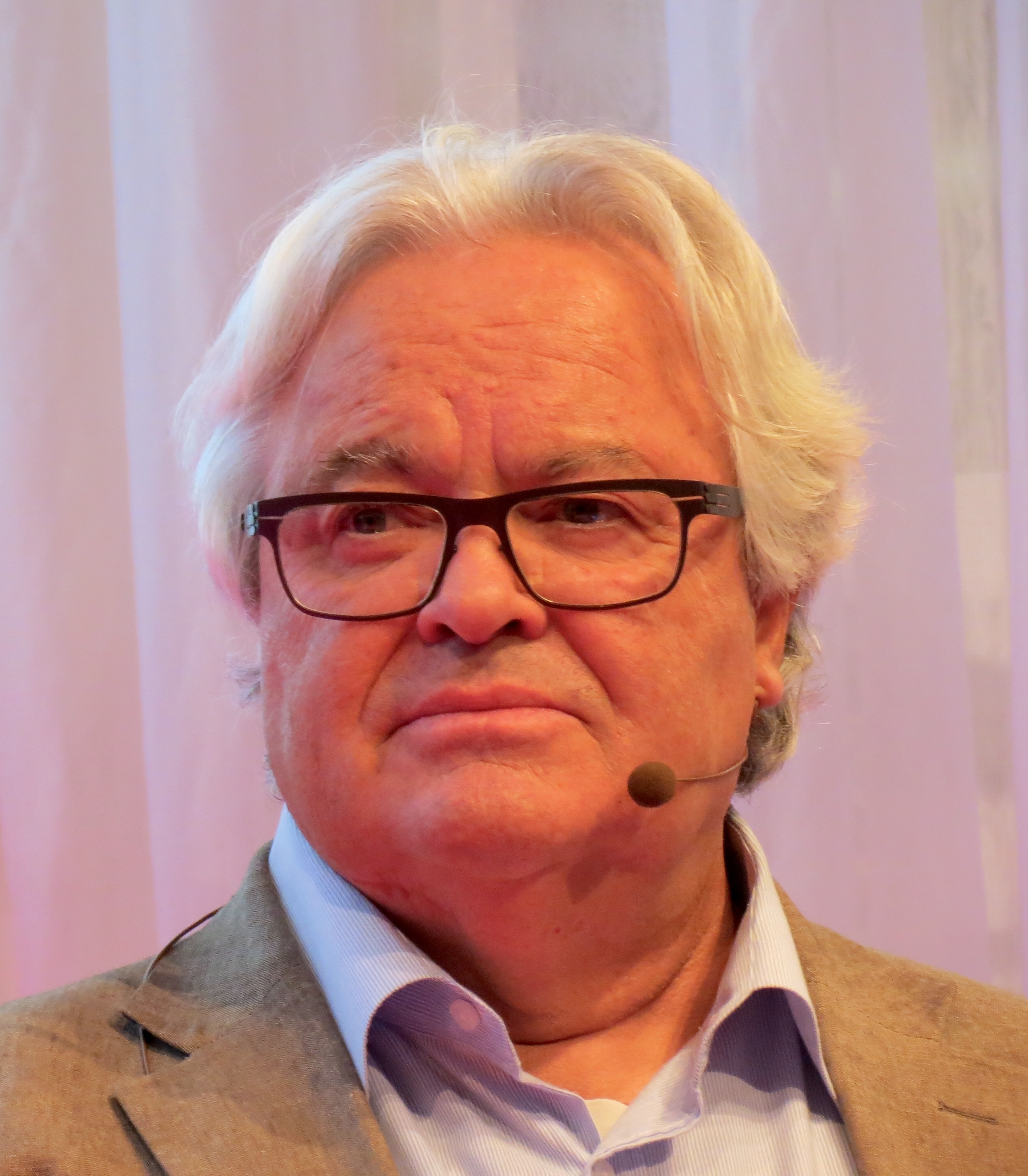
- Born: 1953 (age 72–73); Berlin, Germany

Academic background
- Education: Stockholm University

Academic work
- Discipline: anthropology peace and conflict studies
- Institutions: Malmö University; Stockholm University
- Main interests: cosmopolitanism Guam; Middle East
- Notable works: Pacific Passages: World Culture and Local Politics in Guam; Conflict and Society
- Website: mau.se/en/persons/ronald.stade/

Ronald Stade (born 1953 in Berlin, Germany) is a Swedish anthropologist and professor emeritus of peace and conflict studies, with a specialization in anthropology, at Malmö University. He is known for his writing on cosmopolitanism and on moral questions, and for an ethnography of Guam, Pacific Passages: World Culture and Local Politics in Guam (1998). He was the founding editor of the journal Conflict and Society.

== Career ==
Stade was affiliated with Stockholm University and was a fellow of the Swedish Collegium for Advanced Study in Uppsala. He has also been a guest professor at Hitotsubashi University in Tokyo. He joined Malmö University, where he worked at the School of Arts and Communication (K3) in the Faculty of Culture and Society, and is now professor emeritus there.

Stade was the founding editor of Conflict and Society: Advances in Research, a peer-reviewed annual journal published by Berghahn Books since 2015 that applies ethnographic research to the study of conflict and organized violence.

== Research ==
=== Guam and the Pacific ===
Stade's fieldwork in Guam resulted in Pacific Passages: World Culture and Local Politics in Guam, published in 1998 in the Stockholm Studies in Social Anthropology series.

=== Cosmopolitanism ===
Much of Stade's work concerns cosmopolitanism as a concept and as an attitude. With the anthropologist Nigel Rapport he wrote "A Cosmopolitan Turn – or Return?" (2007) in Social Anthropology, and in the same year he published "Cosmos and Polis, Past and Present" in Theory, Culture & Society. Other anthropologists writing on cosmopolitanism have cited his distinction between pre-modern and modern cosmopolitans.

=== Moral questions, conflict and the Middle East ===
Stade has written on the conceptual history of contested political terms, including an account of "political correctness" as a term used to discredit opponents, and, with Rapport, on cruelty and its contrasts. His research also covers the Middle East, including a baseline study of Lebanon.

== Selected works ==
- Pacific Passages: World Culture and Local Politics in Guam. Stockholm Studies in Social Anthropology. Stockholm: Dept. of Social Anthropology, Stockholm University. 1998. ISBN 978-91-7153-747-8. OCLC 946745882.
- Rapport, Nigel; Stade, Ronald (30 November 2007). "A cosmopolitan turn - or return?". Social Anthropology. 15 (2): 223–235. doi:10.1111/j.0964-0282.2007.00011.x. ISSN 0964-0282. OCLC 437583776.
- "Cosmos and Polis, Past and Present". Theory, Culture & Society. 24 (7–8): 283–285. 2007. doi:10.1177/02632764070240072504. ISSN 0263-2764. OCLC 11175680241.
- "The Social Life of Fighting Words". Conflict and Society. 3 (1): 108–124. 1 June 2017. doi:10.3167/arcs.2017.030109. ISSN 2164-4543. OCLC 7127274218.
- Stade, Ronald; Rapport, Nigel (2023). "An anthropological investigation of cruelty and its contrasts". Philosophy & Social Criticism. 49 (10): 1262–1285. doi:10.1177/01914537221101319. hdl:10023/25714. ISSN 0191-4537. OCLC 1356936251.
