= Transnational Reproduction =

2016 book by anthropologist Daisy Deomampo

Transnational Reproduction: Race, Kinship, and Commercial Surrogacy in India
- Author: Daisy Deomampo
- Language: English
- Genre: Nonfiction anthropology
- Publisher: NYU Press
- Publication date: 2016
- Publication place: United States
- Media type: Print
- Pages: 288
- ISBN: 9781479828388

Transnational Reproduction: Race, Kinship, and Commercial Surrogacy in India is a 2016 book by anthropologist Daisy Deomampo. The book analyzes transnational commercial surrogacy, focusing on the practices of doctors, surrogates, parents, and agents in India. The book proposes that the practice of transnational surrogacy reinforces social status distinctions through a shared "racial reproductive imaginary". Transnational Reproduction was reviewed in Medical Anthropology Quarterly, Social Anthropology, Anthropological Quarterly, International Journal of Comparative Sociology, and Signs.

== Summary ==
The first part of the book reports Deomampo's ethnographic study of commissioning parents who live outside of India. The analysis focuses on how commissioning parents understand and explain the differences in power and social status between themselves and the intended Indian surrogate. Deomampo found that parents typically used one of two explanations: either they saw themselves as helping to rescue Indian surrogates, or they saw the surrogacy experience as a straightforward transaction. Later chapters in the book examine the practices of Indian doctors and agents who take advantage of power differences, such as differences in lack of access to information, to control the surrogacy process and the surrogates themselves.

The book contrasts the experiences of the more powerful, higher status parents, doctors, and agents against the experiences of the Indian surrogates. Deomampo finds that while the women are not uniformly victims, they often make sense of their own situation using the same beliefs and explanations about racial and gender hierarchies that parents, doctors, and agents provide. Deomampo uses the term "racial reproductive imaginary" to describe this set of beliefs and explanations, which place Indian women lower in a racial and gender hierarchy than the parents, agents, and doctors with whom they interact. Deomampo concludes that this common "racial reproductive imaginary" ends up reinforcing existing racial and gender hierarchies.

== Reception ==
Writing for Anthropological Quarterly, Kim Gutschow recommended the book, praising it as an "insightful account of how transnational surrogacy in India reflects and refracts a broader set of social and health inequalities". In Social Anthropology, Vaibhav Saria linked Deomampo's findings to larger policy questions, calling the book "prescient" for showing "how imaginaries and anxieties of race permeate contemporary conditions of intimate labour". Medical Anthropology Quarterly observed that while some of Deomampo's findings were not entirely new and did not always take existing scholarship in the area into account, the book "offers new ethnographic insight into transnational assisted reproduction arrangements in India".
