= Pound Foolish =

2012 finance book by Helaine Olen

Pound Foolish: Exposing the Dark Side of the Personal Finance Industry
- Author: Helaine Olen
- Language: English
- Subject: Personal finance
- Published: 2012 (Portfolio/Penguin)
- Publication place: United States
- Media type: Print (hardback, paperback)
- Pages: 292
- ISBN: 9781591844891
- OCLC: 809989018

Pound Foolish: Exposing the Dark Side of the Personal Finance Industry is a 2012 book by Helaine Olen. In it Olen critiques the industry and the rise of "financial gurus".

== Contents ==
What Hath Sylvia Wrought?
The Tao of Suze
The Latte is a Lie
Slip Slidin' Away
The Road to Pas Tina
I've Got the Horse Right Here
An Empire of Her Own
Who Wants to be a Real Estate Millionaire?
Elmo is B(r)ought to You by the Letter P
We Need to Talk About Our Money

== Reception ==
A review of Pound Foolish by The Economist, although critical of the book's lack of an international perspective, found it an "excellent book, a contemptuous exposé of the American personal-finance industry."

The New York Times called it "a realistic and readable book", noted the "inclusion of many women's voices", and the book's criticism of "financial gurus".

Pound Foolish has also been reviewed by CBSN, Kirkus Reviews, the Journal of Financial Planning, Publishers Weekly, USA Today, The Denver Post, Booklist, and Choice.
