= John Gallas =

British-based New Zealand born poet

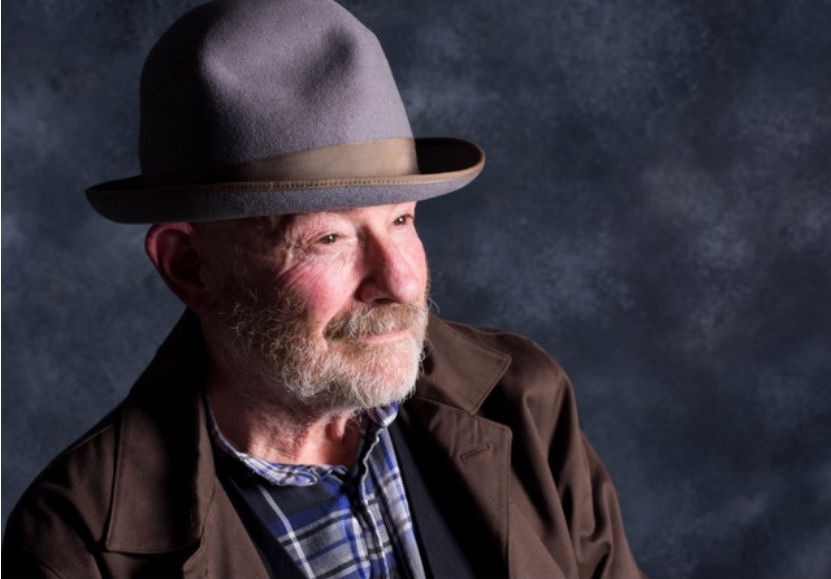
John Gallas in 2020

John Edward Gallas FEA (born 11 January 1950) is a New Zealand born poet who in 2016 was the Joint Winner of the Indigo Dreams Pamphlet Prize and the St Magnus International Festival poet.

== Biography ==
Gallas was born in Wellington in New Zealand and is of Austrian descent, the son of Frederick, né Fritz Eduard Gänzl, an educator, and Nancy Gallas, née Agnes Ada Welsh. He is the younger brother of the historian and writer Kurt Gänzl. He attended the University of Otago in his native New Zealand, and won a Commonwealth Scholarship to Merton College, Oxford to study Medieval English Literature and Old Icelandic and has since lived and worked in York, Liverpool and various other locations in England as a bottlewasher, archaeologist and teacher.

The Little Sublime Comedy was Gallas's tenth Carcanet Press collection. Gallas is the editor of books of translations, including 52 Euros, The Song Atlas and Rhapsodies 1931, also published by Carcanet, and the librettist for David Knotts' Toads on a Tapestry, and for Alasdair Nicolson's opera The Iris Murders. His poem 'Cat' was The Guardian's 'Poem of the Week' in December 2014. A review of Gallas's The Extasie (2021) by Maria Crawford of The Financial Times said, "New Zealand-born, UK-based Gallas fills his 12th Carcanet collection with resounding echoes of John Donne, Thomas Wyatt and John Clare. In a series of love poems set against the patterns of the English landscape, [Gallas] applies a modern-day directness to lyrical expressions of intimacy." His translation of twenty-five poems by Amado Nervo, Poems of Faith and Doubt, was also published in 2021 and was followed by a number of anthologies and translations of sacred poetry with the same publisher. Over the years he has worked with his brother Kurt Gänzl on translations of Baudelaire, Verhaeren, Materlinck, Yourcenar, Anna de Noailles, Nerval, Florian and Borel, among others.

Gallas is a Fellow of the English Association, won the International Welsh Poetry Competition in 2009, was the Joint Winner of the Indigo Dreams Pamphlet Prize in 2016 and was the St Magnus Festival poet in Orkney in the same year. He held the position of John Clare 'The Visit' Poet in 2019, and Sutton Hoo Saxon Ship Oet in 2020. In November 2021 he won the Parkinson's Art Poet of the Year 2021 competition with his poem 'The Night My Great Aunt Invented The Anarchist Hop'., and in 2022 was awarded the National Poetry Library's Brian Dempsey Memorial Poetry Prize, which led to the publication of his collection 17 Paper Resurrections.

== List of books by Gallas ==
- Practical Anarchy (Carcanet)
- Flying Carpets Over Filbert Street (Carcanet)
- Grrrrr (Carcanet)
- Resistance is Futile (Carcanet)
- The Ballad of Robin Hood and the Deer (Agraphia Press), pictures by Clifford Harper
- The Ballad of Santo Caserio (Agraphia Press), pictures by Clifford Harper
- The Song Atlas (Carcanet)
- Star City (Carcanet)
- The Book with Twelve Tales (Carcanet)
- Fucking Poets (3 vols) (Cold Hub Press, New Zealand)
- 40 Lies (Carcanet) pictures by Sarah Kirby
- Fresh Air & The Story of Molecule (Carcanet)
- 52 Euros (Carcanet)
- Pacifictions (Cold Hub Press, New Zealand)
- The Alphabet of Ugly Animals (Magpie Press)
- Mad John's Walk (Five Leaves : Occasional Pamphlets) January 2017
- The Little Sublime Comedy (Carcanet)
- 17 Very Pacific Poems (Indigo Dreams)
- The Blood Book Gerolstein Press, New Zealand (2018)
- The Extasie (Carcanet) 2021
- The Gnawing Flood (Cerasus Press 2021)
- Amado Nervo, Poems of Faith and Doubt (Oxford: SLG Press, 2021), collected and translated
- Where Grace Grows Ever Green: Middle English Lyrics (Oxford: SLG Press, 2021), collected and translated
- The High Roof of Heaven (Oxford: SLG Press, 2022), collected and translated
- Petrus Borel: Rhapsodies 1931, translated from the French by John Gallas and Kurt Gänzl, (Carcanet Classics) 2022
- 17 Paper Resurrections (Dempsey & Windle) 2022
- Drops in the Sea of Time: Women & God (Oxford: SLG Press, 2022), collected and translated
- Fly Not Too High: Gabrielle de Coignard & Vittoria Colonna (Oxford: SLG Press, 2022), collected and translated
- This Far Place: Gabriela Mistral (Oxford: SLG Press, 2023), collected and translated
- Touchpapers (Oxford: SLG Press, 2023), collected and translated
- Reinhard Sorge, Take Flight to God (Oxford: SLG Press, 2024), translated from German
- The Alphabet of Ugly Animals (Cerasus) – forthcoming
- Billy 'Nibs' Buckshot: The Complete Works (Carcanet 2024)
- Vernon Lyrics: The Steadfast Throne of Three, translated from Middle English (Oxford: SLG Press, 2025)
