= Harold Pollack =

American professor

Harold Pollack is an American professor at the University of Chicago who has been appointed to two Institute of Medicine committees. His research has focused on public health and health policy. At the University of Chicago, he has chaired the Center for Health Administration Studies. A special correspondent for the New Republic during 2009 and 2010, he writes frequently about public policy for a variety of national publications. Pollack is a frequent contributor to Healthinsurance.org, where he has conducted interviews with other prominent health policy bloggers, including Jonathan Cohn. He is also the Faculty Co-Director of the University of Chicago Crime Lab and Health Lab.

== Background ==
Pollack went to Princeton University for his undergraduate education. He received his masters and doctoral degrees in Public Policy from the Kennedy School of Government at Harvard University. After attending Harvard, he was a Robert Wood Johnson Foundation fellow at Yale University before teaching at the University of Michigan School of Public Health and then the University of Chicago.

== Works ==
- The Index Card: Why Personal Finance Doesn't Have to Be Complicated, Helaine Olen, Harold Pollack, 2017, Portfolio. ISBN 978-0143130529
