= St Magnus Festival =

Arts Festival

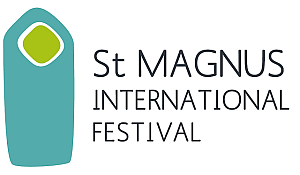
Logo of the St Magnus International Festival, Orkney

The St Magnus International Festival is an annual, week-long arts festival which takes place at midsummer on the islands of Orkney, off the north coast of mainland Scotland.

== History and management ==
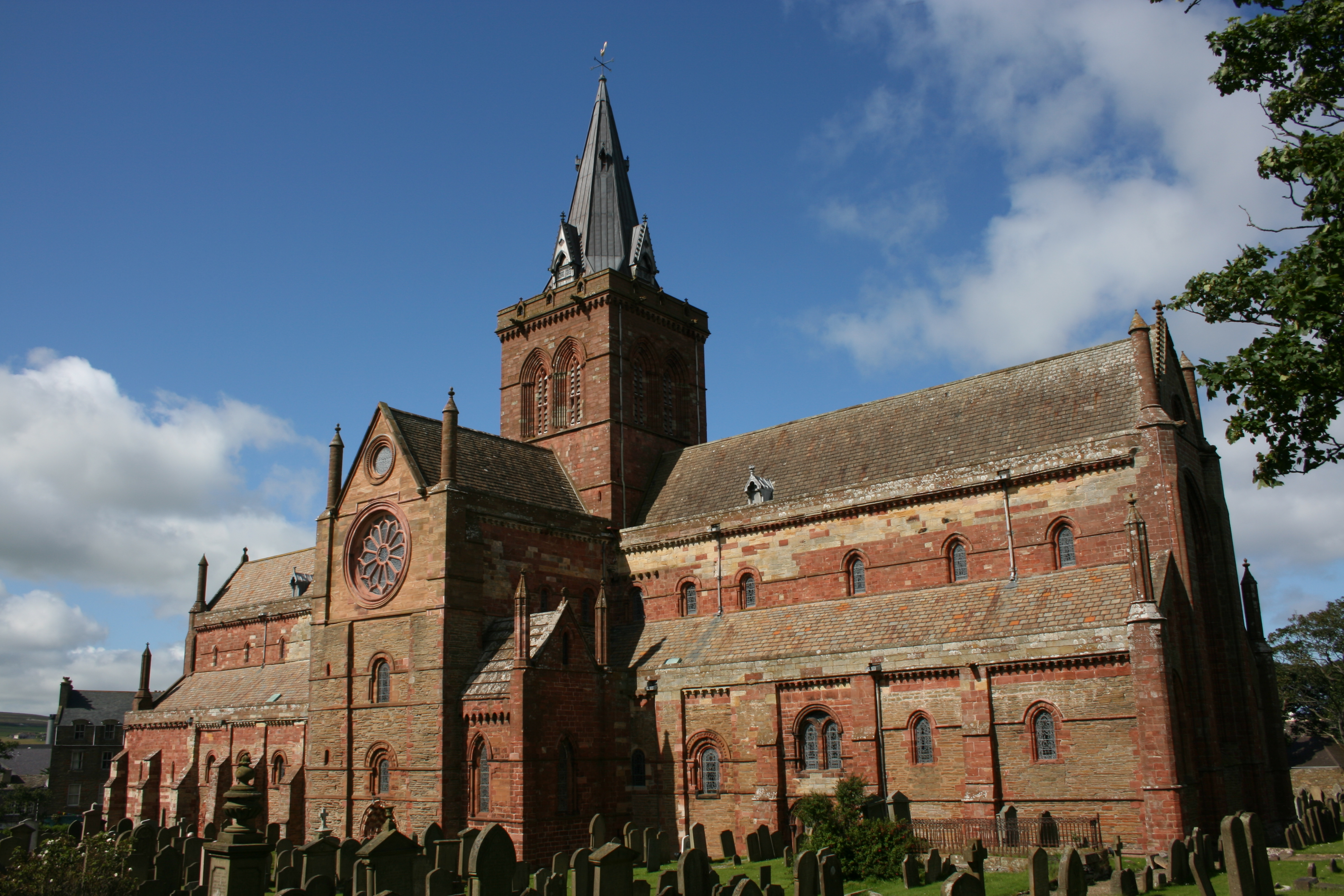
St. Magnus Cathedral in Kirkwall, one of the venues for the festival

The festival was founded in 1977 by a group including the composer Sir Peter Maxwell Davies, who was a resident of Orkney, and the Orcadian poet George Mackay Brown. The artistic director is Alasdair Nicolson, who succeeded Glenys Hughes in 2010. The artistic programme consists mainly of music alongside drama, dance, literature and the visual arts, and is managed by a small staff and many local volunteers, who also offer accommodation for visiting artists.

== Artists and repertoire ==
Artists who have appeared at the festival include Vladimir Ashkenazy, Nicola Benedetti, Colin Currie, Evelyn Glennie, John Harle, Angela Hewitt, Steven Isserlis, Paul Lewis, John Lill, Tasmin Little, Joanna MacGregor, Lisa Milne, Steven Osborne and Isaac Stern. Many orchestras and ensembles have visited the festival both from Scotland and England.

Festival poets have included Carol Ann Duffy, John Gallas, Seamus Heaney, Jackie Kay, Gwyneth Lewis, Liz Lochhead and Andrew Motion. The National Theatre of Scotland also appeared at the festival in 2007.

== Commissions ==
The St Magnus Festival has commissioned music from composers including James MacMillan, Judith Weir, Simon Holt, Sir Richard Rodney Bennett, Thea Musgrave, Sally Beamish, Edward McGuire, William Sweeney, Gordon McPherson and David Horne. Premières of works by Sir Peter Maxwell Davies have included works written in collaboration with or inspired by the work of the Orcadian writer George Mackay Brown.

Visual arts, drama and dance projects have also been commissioned for the festival, including a trio of original plays by Alan Plater.

== Community participation and additional events ==
Education and community projects have included many residents of Orkney. The St Magnus Festival Chorus includes around 130 singers from all parts of the archipelago. The festival prides itself on its involvement with the local community and the support provided by local residents.

The Festival on Tour project has visited Orkney's outer islands to give workshops and performances for schools and communities. Beginning in 2006, a type of fringe festival called MagFest has included late-night shows, circus, cabaret, comedy, music and children's events. Orkney Conducting Course, St Magnus Composers' Course, a Writers' Course and, from 2012, a Singers' Course also run alongside the festival.

The conductors' and composers' courses were not held in 2016, the 40th anniversary of the festival. The director, Alasdair Nicolson, attributed this to a lack of funding.
