= Jonathan Cohn =

American author and journalist (born 1969)

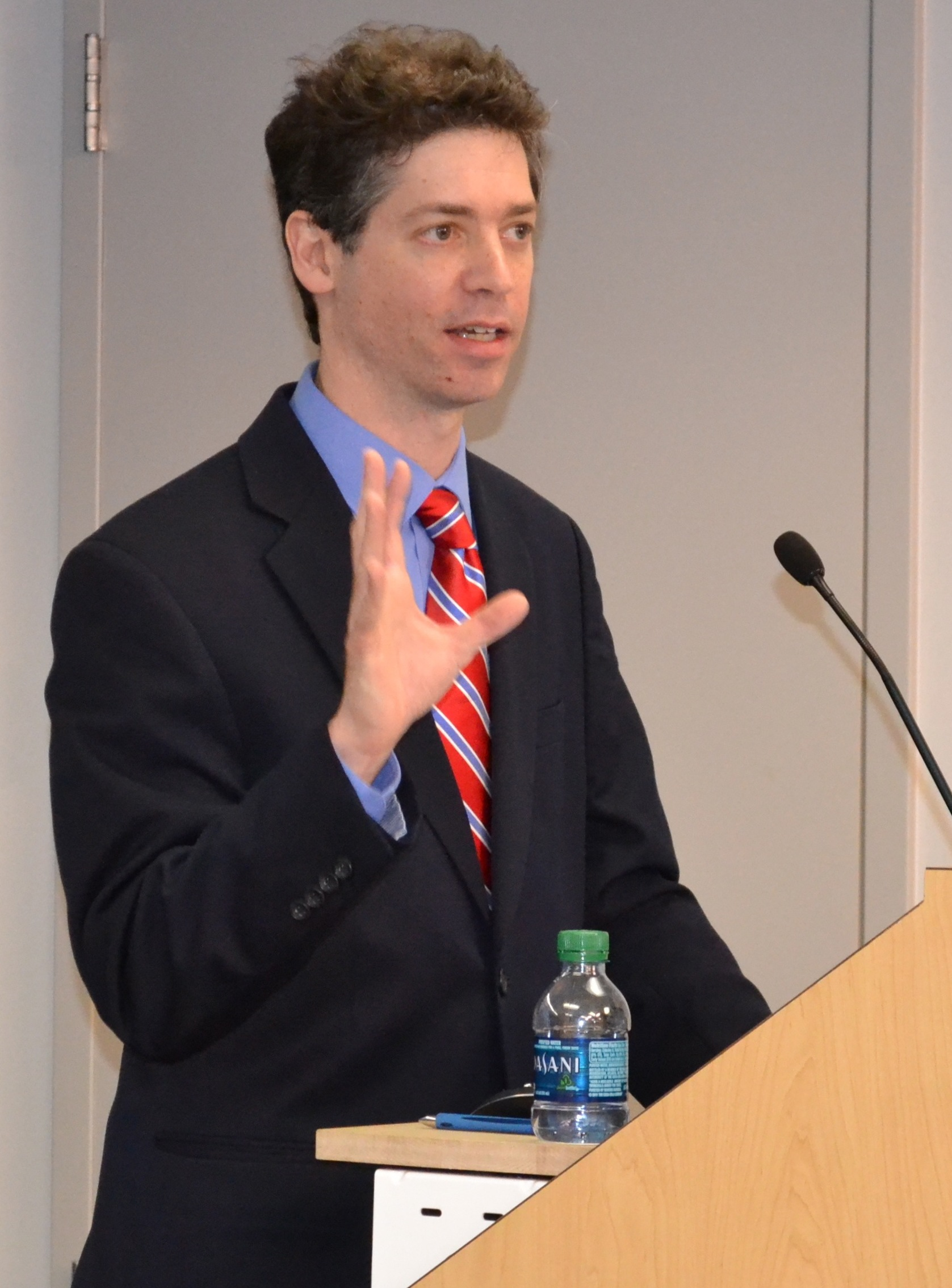
Cohn in 2012

Jonathan Scott Cohn (born 1969) is an American author and journalist who writes mainly on United States public policy and political issues. Formerly the executive editor of The American Prospect, a senior editor at The New Republic, and a senior national correspondent at The Huffington Post, in 2025 he began writing a newsletter, "The Breakdown", published by The Bulwark.

== Early life and education ==
Cohn was raised in Fort Lauderdale, Florida, where he attended Pine Crest School. He went on to study at Harvard University, where he became president of The Harvard Crimson and graduated in 1991.

== Career ==
Before joining The New Republic in 1997, Cohn served as executive editor at The American Prospect. Cohn has also written for the Boston Globe, Mother Jones, The New York Times, Newsweek, Rolling Stone, Slate and the Washington Post. He has been a media fellow at the Henry J. Kaiser Family Foundation. and a senior fellow at Demos, and is a member of the National Academy of Social Insurance. He has appeared on television and radio shows, including MSNBC's "Countdown," NPR's "Fresh Air," and "The Colbert Report".

Cohn's writings have especially focused on social welfare and health care. He has been recognized in the pages of the Washington Post as "one of the nation's leading experts on health care policy" and in The New York Times as "one of the best health care writers out there".

Cohn is the author of the 2007 book, Sick: The Untold Story of America's Health Care Crisis - and the People Who Pay the Price (2007). In Sick, Cohn advocates for universal health insurance, financed by the government. It presents case studies that demonstrate how America's current system causes even many middle class Americans serious financial or medical hardship. It lays out a history of health insurance in America and points to the record of systems abroad, particularly in France.

From early 2009 through the spring of 2010, Cohn edited and was the primary writer for "The Treatment", a blog about health care for The New Republic. In May, 2010, he started a blog for "The New Republic" called "Citizen Cohn", a name he has kept for his Twitter feed.

In 2013, fellow health policy wonk Harold Pollack interviewed Cohn, getting his take on the future of the Affordable Care Act, the ACA's proposed Medicaid expansion, and the 2012 elections. In 2021, Cohn published a book about the Affordable Care Act, The Ten Year War: Obamacare and the Unfinished Crusade for Universal Coverage.

== Awards ==
Winner, AHCJ Excellence in Health Journalism (2013) for "The Robot Will See You Now"

Co-winner, Sidney Hillman Award (2010) for "The Treatment"

Special Mention, Sidney Hillman Award (2009) for "Auto Destruct"

Co-winner, Harry Chapin Media Award (2008) for Sick

Finalist, Robert F. Kennedy Book Award and New York Public Library Helen Bernstein Award (2008) for Sick

== Personal life ==
Cohn lived for many years in the Boston area before moving to his present home, Ann Arbor, Michigan with his wife, University of Michigan professor Amy Mainville Cohn. She is a professor and researcher in Industrial and Operations Engineering at the University of Michigan.

Cohn was a member of JournoList.

== Bibliography ==
- Cohn, Jonathan (2007). Sick: The Untold Story of America's Health Care Crisis—And the People Who Pay the Price. New York: HarperCollins. ISBN 978-0-060-58046-9. OCLC 1122621169.
- Cohn, Jonathan (2021). The Ten Year War: Obamacare and the Unfinished Crusade for Universal Coverage. New York: St. Martin's Press. ISBN 978-1-250-27093-1. OCLC 1227106081.
