= Steven Rowley =

American novelist

- Education: Emerson College
- Occupation: Novelist
- Spouse: Byron Lane
- Writing career
- Language: English
- Subjects: Magical realism, Gay literature
- Notable work: Lily and the Octopus
- Website: www.stevenrowley.com

Steven Rowley is an American novelist whose works include Lily and the Octopus (2016), The Guncle (2021) and The Celebrants (2023).

== Career ==
After writing a short story about the death of his dachshund, Lily, to cope with his grief, Rowley expanded it into a novel. He wrote Lily and the Octopus in 100 days and submitted it to approximately 30 literary agents, who all declined to represent him. Rowley said of the manuscript, "I was proud of it as a piece of writing, but I never thought that this was going to change my life." Intending to self-publish, Rowley hired freelance editor Molly Pisani, who later pitched the novel to her former colleague, Karyn Marcus of Simon & Schuster. Impressed by the quality of the book, Marcus forwarded it to Simon & Schuster editor-in-chief Marysue Rucci, who instructed Marcus to buy it. Lily and the Octopus was published on June 7, 2016.

Rowley has since published six other novels: The Editor (2019); The Guncle (2021) and its sequel, The Guncle Abroad (2024); The Celebrants (2023); The Dogs of Venice (2025); and Take Me with You (2026).

He also published the children's picture book Our Guncle, illustrated by Eda Kaban, in May 2026.

== Novels ==
- Lily and the Octopus (2016)
- The Editor (2019)
- The Guncle (2021)
- The Celebrants (2023)
- The Guncle Abroad (2024)
- The Dogs of Venice (2025)
- Take Me with You (2026)

== Personal life ==
Rowley met writer Byron Lane on the dating site OKCupid in 2013. Lane proposed marriage in the acknowledgements of his 2020 novel A Star Is Bored, and the pair married in April 2021.
