= Millennial grey =

Interior design trend

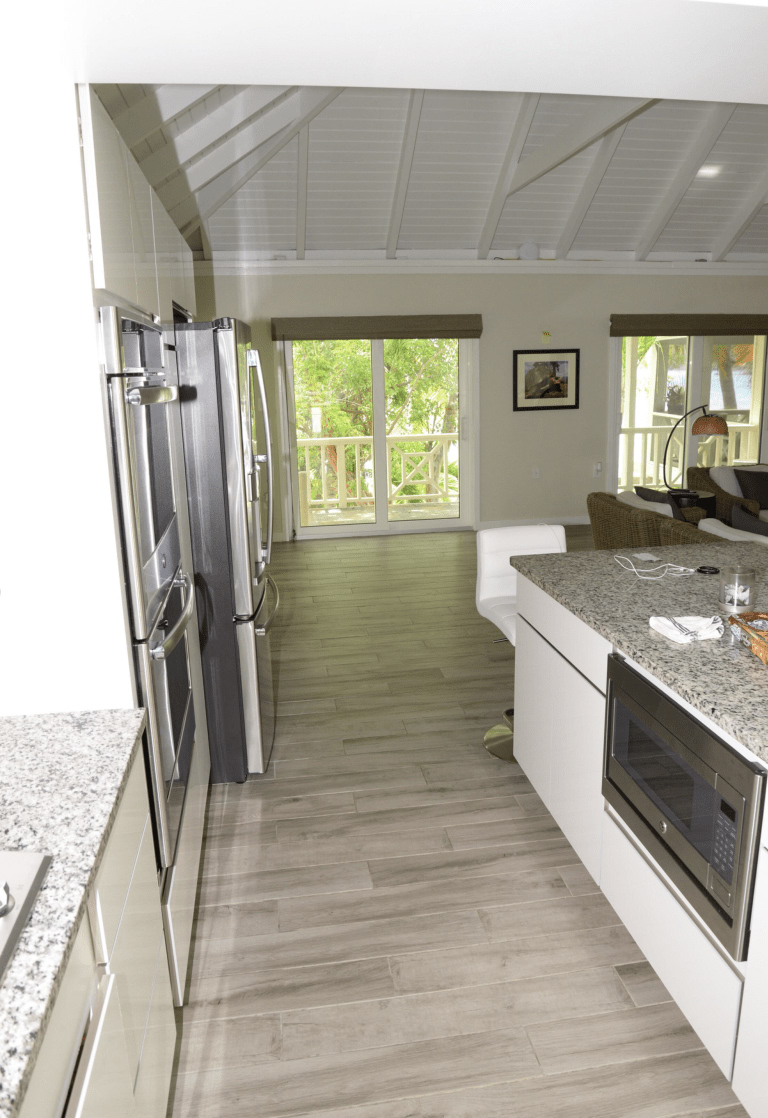
A kitchen with grey floors and furnishings, considered to be in the "millennial grey" style

Millennial grey (also developer grey) is a pejorative name given to a desaturated colour scheme in interior design, which some media commentators have claimed appeals to the sensibilities of the millennial generation in the early 21st century, but which has also been criticised as a fabrication by marketers, similar to other claimed intergenerational divides.

The colour scheme is often chosen by people flipping a property, absent landlords such as vacation rental owners, or other people who do not actually live in the property, with the occupant having little choice in the matter.

The greying may have been driven, in part, by a desire to prepare properties for sale in a manner thought to be least offensive to the average buyer. Given the housing crises gripping many countries in the early to mid-21st century, buyers and renters may feel they have no choice but to accept a property decked in the scheme.

== Reactions ==
The scheme is polarising, particularly when used with imitation wood texture sheet vinyl flooring, which many describe as depressing, soulless, or corporate. Scorn for so-called "neutral" colour schemes has antecedents stretching at least as far back as the 19th century, including from critics such as John Ruskin.

According to the National Association of Realtors, a US trade consortium, while the colour scheme had been "dominating fashion and home decor trends and becoming synonymous with modernity and sophistication" for years, as of 2023 it was "going out of style", with "more vibrant, lively colors" taking its place. Better Homes and Gardens then claimed in 2026 that millennial grey was "finally on its way out" while simultaneously offering warmer décor products for readers to consume. The COVID-19 lockdowns have also been linked to a reaction against neutral colours, as people spent more time in their homes and desired more warmth and feedback from their surroundings.

== Theorised origins ==
Cultural historian Kassia St. Clair attributes the widespread adoption of the colour scheme to a desire among millennials for "a flexible, sensible choice that will last years, hide any stains, and can be adapted to different schemes." Others attribute it to a desire to quietly signal wealth.

It may have a connection to other trends in decoration, including "Live, Laugh, Love", the aesthetics of McMansions, and televised home renovation programmes on networks such as HGTV. In the early 21st century, areas other than interior decoration have also seen a move to desaturated colour schemes, including the industrial design of smartphones and automobiles. Figures tabulated by BASF found that 88% of global automobile sales in 2025 were for white, black, grey, or silver models.

An origin in minimalism has also been speculated for the trend, and in the work of modernists such as Le Corbusier, who had written in his 1923 essay collection Toward an Architecture that colour "is suited to simple races, peasants and savages".
