= Welsh Poetry Competition =

Annual English language competition in Wales

The International Welsh Poetry Competition was an annual English-language poetry award, once the largest of its kind in Wales. The contest was founded in 2007 by Welsh writer, poet and photographer Dave Lewis.

It was launched on St David's Day 2007 in Clwb-Y-Bont, Pontypridd.

The competition's judges, all Welsh poets, have included John Evans, Mike Jenkins, Eloise Williams (former Children's Laureate Wales), Sally Spedding, Kathy Miles (former Bridport Prize winner) and Mick Evans.

The organiser, Dave Lewis, has also edited and published four anthologies of all the winners: The First Five Years, Ten Years On, The Third One, and The Final Cut.

In 2020, he also founded the Maya Poetry Book Awards, which seeks to reward indie/small press poets with a book-length collection.

== Past winners ==
- 2026 kerry rawlinson (British Columbia, Canada), Kokanee, Spawning
- 2025 Mark Lewis (Kilgetty, Wales), Notes from a transported convict
- 2024 Gill Learner (Reading, England), Once Upon A Time
- 2023 Jenny McRobert (Winchester, England), Pegasus Rising
- 2022 Jennifer Hetherington (Fishermans Reach, Australia), Cross Words
- 2021 Estelle Price (Wilmslow, England), iii
- 2020 Sheila Aldous (Devon, England), The Debt Due
- 2019 Damen O'Brien (Queensland, Australia), The Map-Makers Tale
- 2018 Judy Durrant (Victoria, Australia), Prayer To A Jacaranda
- 2017 Rae Howells (Swansea, Wales), Airlings
- 2016 Tarquin Landseer (London, England), Blackfish
- 2015 Mick Evans (Carmarthenshire, Wales), Map Makers
- 2014 Kathy Miles (Cardigan, Wales), The Pain Game
- 2013 Josie Turner (Kent, England), Rations
- 2012 Sally Spedding (Ammanford, Wales), She wears green
- 2011 David J Costello (Wirral, England), Horseshoe Bat
- 2010 Sally Spedding (Ammanford, Wales), Litzmannstadt 1941
- 2009 John Gallas (Leicestershire, England), The origami lesson
- 2008 Emily Hinshelwood (Ammanford, Wales), Visually Speaking
- 2007 Gavin Price (Cardiff, Wales), Concrete
