= Simple Recipes (short story) =

2004 short story by Madeleine Thien

- Short story by Madeleine Thien
- Country: Canada
- Language: English
- Genre: Short story

Publication
- Published in: Simple Recipes
- Publication type: Book
- Media type: Print
- Publication date: 2004

"Simple Recipes" is a short story by Canadian writer Madeleine Thien. The story shows that while cooking may be simple, family relationships are not.

In "Simple Recipes" the leading actor is an immigrant family. There are four people in the family: a mother, a father, a sister and a brother. The narrator's father wants his children to keep their Malaysian culture, but her brother wants to blend into Canadian society. The father and brother have conflicts over various things, such as food. The narrator's father cooks fish, but the brother does not want to eat it. The father loves his son but he does not know how to tell him that. Because of the lack of communication, the love eventually becomes burden and harm. The father’s love leads to many expectations he is trying to put on his son, and when his son cannot fulfil his expectations, he becomes extremely disappointed and starts to beat his son.

== Summary ==
The short story "Simple Recipes" by Madeleine Thien describes a tense and emotional moment in a family, revealing deeper issues of control, fear, and conflict between the narrator's father and her older brother. In the story "Simple Recipes", there is a family of four, who struggle with whether they should keep their original Malaysian culture or abolish it. In the family, the brother wants to join in with Canadian society, but the father refuses to abandon the traditional culture.

In "Simple Recipes" the narrator tells a story on her childhood and the close relationship she shares with her family. She admires her father because he believed that "everything was simple" and taught her important lessons through cooking. As the family adapts to life in Canada, her older brother keeps distant from his culture and often clashes with their father.

The climax of the story happens during a normal family dinner where the parents and children are all eating together. The narrator's brother refuses to eat the fish his father has cooked. The brother then tries to eat, but the situation suddenly changes when he begins to choke on the cauliflower. Instead of reacting calmly or showing concern, the narrator's father violently hits the brother's face and states "I don't know what kind of son you are. To be so ungrateful". Moreover, the older brother becomes angry and insults his father using aggressive language, saying "I hate you", and showing that he has been holding his anger for a long time: his reaction is not only about this choking incident, but also about his father's strict and controlling behaviour. Eventually, the father grabs a bamboo pole and begins to hit the brother, turning the situation into a serious and harmful family conflict. This is a key moment in the story because it changes how the narrator sees her father, and it affects the whole family.

== Critical responses ==
The author Pedro M. Carmona Rodríguez argues that the title “Simple Recipes” is ironic because although it refers to simple everyday meals prepared for the family, the actual family relationships in the story are anything but simple. This statement is accurate because the word “recipes” suggests something easy and “plainness", but the story shows that the family’s emotional and cultural relationships are very complicated.

Carmona Rodríguez also points out that both children have lost their parents' language. This creates a gap between the parents and the children, making communication more difficult. Food and language both become symbols of culture, and when they are rejected, the connection within the family begins to break down.

In “Simple Recipes”, the fish is a key symbol representing both the brother and the father. The fish slowly suffocates in the sink, just as the brother struggles under family pressure and cultural conflict, with similar descriptions linking their pain. The fish also reflects the father, a first-generation immigrant who feels out of place in Canadian society. After witnessing her father’s violence, the narrator’s love becomes mixed with shame and sadness. Highlighting her lasting guilt and the themes of immigration, cultural conflict, and family relationships.

Weihsin Gui believes that people who are part of visible minority groups in Canada are often treated differently because of their race. She says this can make them feel excluded from society.

According to Weihsin Gui"s interpretation "While this may seem at first glance like a conventional clash between first- and second-generation immigrants, the narrator-daughter seems able to cross this generational boundary and understand how her father thinks and feels".

Glenn Deer thinks that “When the daughter witnesses this violence, her initial love is transformed to shame and grief.” Glenn Deer mainly focuses on the detailed described in the story. He first makes a comparison between the narrator and her father, “while I was born into the persistence of the Vancouver rain, my father was born in the wash of a monsoon country” Then Glenn Deer describes the beginning of the story where “opening domestic atmosphere depicts the comforting smells of cooking and the recollected pleasures of food and commensal ritual”, which suggested that at the beginning of the story, the house appeared as warm and relaxing. However everything changes after the father beats his son, this is shown through the change of the narrator's mind and action. When the narrator grew up, “In my apartments, I keep the walls scrubbed clean. I open the windows and turn the fan on when-ever I prepare a meal” this is a comparison to what her father’s house looks like where “the ceilings were yellowed with grease. Even the air was heavy with it”A more obvious rejection of her father’s “simple recipes” occurs when she declares that she never uses the rice cooker that he presented as a gift to her, as if its use would also revive memories of his violence.
