= Do Not Say We Have Nothing =

2016 novel by Madeleine Thien

- Author: Madeleine Thien
- Language: English
- Genre: Historical fiction
- Publisher: Knopf Canada
- Publication date: 2016
- Publication place: Canada
- ISBN: 978-1-78378-266-6

Do Not Say We Have Nothing is a novel by Madeleine Thien published in 2016 in Canada. It follows a 10-year-old girl and her mother who invite a Chinese refugee into their home. Critically acclaimed, in 2016 the author was awarded both the Scotiabank Giller Prize and the Governor General's Award for this novel. It was short-listed for the Man Booker Prize as well as the Women's Prize for Fiction.

== Plot summary ==
The novel begins with a girl named Marie living with her mother in Vancouver, Canada. The year is 1991, and the addition to their household of a Chinese refugee fleeing the post-Tiananmen Square crackdown, Ai-Ming, is the catalyst that sets the rest of the plot into motion. The novel quickly fractures into a number of different sub-plots, introduced by Ai-Ming, which span generations of both Marie and Ai-Ming's families, who are later revealed to be intrinsically connected. These sub-plots are set during a tumultuous period in China's history, from the beginning of Mao Zedong's reign in the late 1940s to the aftermath of the Tiananmen Square protests of 1989. There are four main eras that the novel focuses on, though they do not necessarily occur in chronological order. The first involves Big Mother Knife, her sister Swirl, and Swirl's husband Wen the Dreamer during the land reform campaign and the executions that were involved. Secondly is the era focusing on Sparrow, Kai and Zhuli during the Cultural Revolution which centers around the Shanghai Conservatory and their experiences there. Thirdly is Sparrow and Ai-Ming, his daughter, during the Tiananmen Square protests and aftermath. Finally, the last era is the "present" which is Marie discovering her connection to all these stories. As well, the story contained in the Book of Records is a constant presence throughout all these other narratives. While Wen the Dreamer is the principal translator and contributor to the book, as the novel progresses the stories of all the characters become so incorporated into the Book of Records that the line is blurred between fact and fiction, past and present.

== Characters ==
A kinship diagram showing the relationships between the main characters in Do Not Say We Have Nothing

- Jiang Li-ling: Li-ling, also referred to as Marie and Ma-li, is the main character and narrator of the book. The novel shifts from present day where Marie interacts with her Ma and Ai-ming, to past generations where characters like Big Mother Knife and Sparrow struggle with the Cultural Revolution in China.
- Jiang Kai: Kai is Marie's father. We learn at the beginning of the novel that he leaves his daughter and wife to go to Hong Kong and eventually commits suicide. Later we learn that he had a close relationship with Sparrow growing up, which stemmed from an interest in classical music at the Shanghai Conservatory of Music.
- Ma: Ma takes care of her daughter, Marie, back in Vancouver. She also takes Ai-ming into her home upon receiving word that she is seeking refuge after the Tiananmen Square protests.
- Ai-ming: Ai-ming is the daughter of Sparrow and Ling as well as the friend and neighbour of Yiwen. Ai-ming flees China after participating in the Tiananmen Square protests in 1989 and finds a home with Marie and Ma for a short while in Vancouver. Eventually she leaves for America with the hope that she can make a better life for herself.
- Big Mother Knife: Big Mother Knife is the wife of Ba Lute, sister of Swirl, and mother to Sparrow, Flying Bear, and Big Mountain. She has a close relationship with her sister and has a hard time reconciling the horrors that Swirl faces with the political powers that Ba Lute fights for.
- Swirl: Swirl is the sister of Big Mother Knife and the wife of Wen the Dreamer. Wen the Dreamer and Swirl are punished with re-education through hard labour under Mao Zedong's regime in order to help them learn from their mistakes – they harbour a secret library cellar where they store valuable heirlooms, documents, American books, and other contraband.
- Ba Lute: Ba Lute is the husband of Big Mother Knife and fought for the People's Liberation Army during the birth of his son Sparrow. He places a lot of trust in Mao's Communist Party.
- Sparrow: Sparrow is the brother of Flying Bear and Big Mountain, as well as Zhuli's cousin. He develops a musical relationship with Zhuli through their interests at the conservatory. Sparrow writes several symphonies throughout the novel but struggles to share them out of fear of judgement. He has a close relationship with Kai because of their work together with classical music, but it grows into something more.
- Wen the Dreamer: Wen the Dreamer is the husband of Swirl and the son of renowned Chinese scholar Old West. Old West was selected by the Emperor to embark on a trip to America in order to foster his learning. Upon returning, and before he could share a lot of his knowledge, Wen's father died. Wen faces some resentment in the novel because Old West still owed 10 years of skilled labour to the emperor when he died. Wen is a poet.
- Zhuli: Zhuli is the daughter of Wen the Dreamer and Swirl. She is comforted by Big Mother Knife while her parents are tortured and is dropped off on her doorstep. She also is a gifted violinist and has a close relationship with Kai as well as Sparrow, despite being 10 years his junior.
- Flying Bear and Big Mountain: Flying Bear and Big Mountain are brothers to Sparrow and sons to Big Mother Knife and Ba Lute. They are interchangeable at the beginning of the novel but eventually grow apart.
- Ling: Ling is the wife of Sparrow and the mother of Ai-ming. She develops a close relationship with Yiwen particularly after Ai-ming flees China, and encourages her to attend the University of Tokyo.
- Lu Yiwen: Yiwen is Ai-ming's neighbour and close friend growing up. The two of them get involved as students in the Tiananmen Square protests where they frequently get themselves in trouble, causing Yiwen's parents to worry.

== Historical contexts ==
Thien references numerous songs and texts from Chinese history. These include Sima Qian's "Historical Records". The title, Do Not Say We Have Nothing, is a reference to the Chinese version of the left-wing anthem: "The Internationale", which has been a staple anthem of the Chinese Communist Party after Qu Qiubai’s translation of the Russian version in 1923. Within the plot of the novel this anthem occurs at numerous points, particularly as a rallying cry for the student protesters at Tiananmen Square, at which Ai-Ming and Sparrow are present: "The people around her were weeping. At the front, the student leaders began to sing the Internationale." (Thien 438). Also referenced in the novel is the song "The East is Red", which was used as the unofficial national anthem during the Cultural Revolution within which many of the events in the Kai and Sparrow's subplots occur. Additionally, the novel refers to "Song of the Guerrillas", a Chinese anthem that describes Chinese guerrilla fighters during the Second Sino-Japanese War. In a 2017 interview, Thien created a "Book Note" playlist that included numerous musical artists who influenced her writing of the novel. These artists included J.S. Bach, Ros Sereysothea, Sinn Sisamouth, Dmitri Shostakovich, Leonard Cohen, and Sun Belt.

== Awards and honours ==
- 2016 Man Booker Prize, shortlisted.
- 2016 Scotiabank Giller Prize, won.
- 2016 Governor General's Award for English-language fiction, won.
- 2016 Andrew Carnegie Medals for Excellence in Fiction and Nonfiction, longlisted.
- 2017 Edward Stanford Travel Writing Awards – Writing with a Sense of Place, won.
- 2017 Bailey's Women's Prize for Fiction, shortlisted.
- 2017 Rathbones Folio Prize, shortlisted.
- 2018 Grinzane Cavour Prize, shortlisted.

Nous qui n'étions rien, a French translation of the novel by Catherine Leroux, won the Governor General's Award for English to French translation at the 2019 Governor General's Awards.

== Reception ==
Jiayang Fan, a staff writer of The New York Times, called Do Not Say We Have Nothing "a powerfully expansive novel", specifically calling Thien's "Book of Records" the root of the novel's "remarkable authenticity". Jennifer Senior, another writer for The New York Times, wrote that the book "impresses in many senses. ... It successfully explores larger ideas about politics and art. ... It has the satisfying, epic sweep of a 19th-century Russian novel, spanning three generations and lapping up against the shores of two continents".

On a similar vein, Brian Bethune, a writer for Maclean's, called the novel "a worthy winner of the Governor General's Award". Highlighting the novel's interaction "with history and memory in [an] extraordinarily delicate fashion", Bethune claimed that "it is a story of such beauty that it provokes a paradoxical hope".

Following the announcement of the 2016 Giller Prize, Mark Medley of The Globe and Mail wrote that "while Ms. Thien has long been considered one of [Canada]'s most talented young writers, with her books receiving critical acclaim, the country's major literary awards had eluded her - until this year".

Lawrence Hill, a juror on the panel for the Giller Prize, called the novel a "beautiful look at the salvation of music and love and life in the face of genocide. It’s a huge epic novel told in an unusual way – without a single protagonist, without a single struggle. It’s a challenging book, and you have to work to read it".

Bronwyn Drainie of the Literary Review of Canada wrote that Thien "[creates] a memorial for the millions of lives lost, disappeared, shriveled or wasted during not just the years of Mao’s reign but back to the famine of 1910 and forward to the dashed hopes of Tiananmen in 1989. That is some accomplishment".
