= Madeleine Thien =

Canadian short story writer and novelist

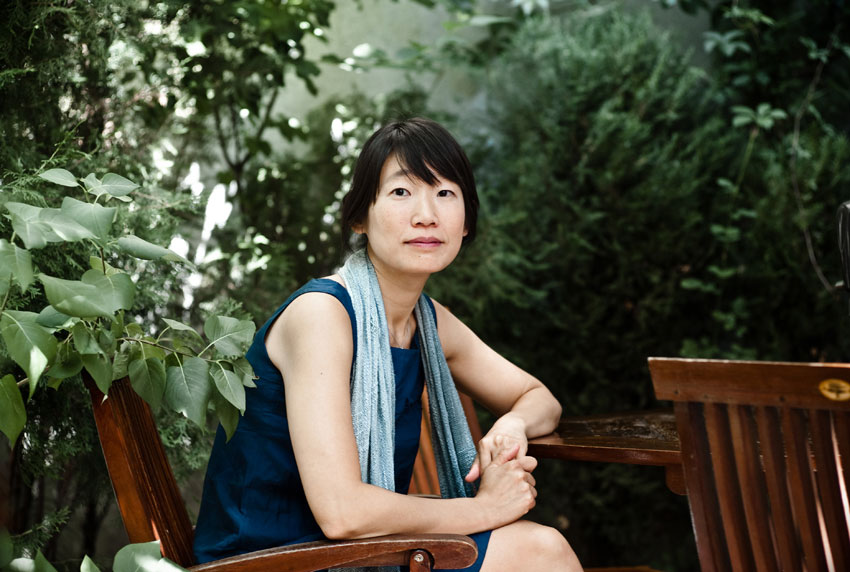
- Born: 1974 (age 51–52); Vancouver, British Columbia, Canada
- Education: Simon Fraser University; University of British Columbia
- Occupation: Writer
- Partner: Rawi Hage
- Writing career
- Notable work: Do Not Say We Have Nothing
- Notable awards: Guggenheim Fellow (2026)
- Website: madeleinethien.com

Madeleine Thien (traditional Chinese: 鄧敏靈; simplified Chinese: 邓敏灵; pinyin: Dèng Mǐnlíng; b. 1974) is a Canadian short story writer and novelist. The Oxford Handbook of Canadian Literature has considered her work as reflecting the increasingly trans-cultural nature of Canadian literature, exploring art, expression and politics inside Cambodia and China, as well as within diasporic East Asian communities. Thien's critically acclaimed novel, Do Not Say We Have Nothing, won the 2016 Governor General's Award for English-language fiction, the Scotiabank Giller Prize, and the Edward Stanford Travel Writing Awards for Fiction. It was shortlisted for the 2016 Man Booker Prize, the 2017 Baileys Women's Prize for Fiction, and the 2017 Rathbones Folio Prize. Her books have been translated into more than 25 languages.

== Early life and education ==
Thien was born in Vancouver, British Columbia, in 1974 to a Malaysian Chinese father and a Hong Kong Chinese mother. She studied contemporary dance at Simon Fraser University and earned a Master's degree in Fine Arts specializing in Creative Writing from the University of British Columbia. Thien made the decision to switch from dance to creative writing for a few reasons, but mainly due to the fact that she felt inadequate in talent, despite her passion for the art. Prior to working as an editor for the Rice Paper Magazine, she worked from an early age in clerical, retail and restaurant jobs. Thien was a finalist for Writers' Trust of Canada's RBC Bronwen Wallace Award for Emerging Writers in 1999, and in 2001 she was awarded the Emerging Writers Award from the Asian Canadian Writers’ Workshop for her short story collection Simple Recipes.

== Career ==
Many of Thien's works focus on the theme of time in connection to place and human emotion. In an interview with Granta from 2016, she states that she is thinking about "the way that women’s lives are expressed in literature at this moment," and that she is interested in writing about nonwhite women and sexuality.

=== Publications ===
In 2001, her first book titled Simple Recipes was published. The book is a collection of short fiction pieces exploring conflicts within intergenerational and, in two stories, intercultural relationships. In the same year, Thien adapted artist Joe Chang's National Film Board short film, The Chinese Violin (2001), into a children's book. The story follows a young Chinese girl's journey as she and her musician father adjust to life in Vancouver.

Thien's debut novel, Certainty (Toronto: M&S, 2006; New York: Little, Brown, 2007; London: Faber, 2007), follows a documentary producer as she searches for the truth about her father's experience living in Japanese-occupied Malaysia. The novel has been published internationally and translated into 16 languages.

Her second novel, Dogs at the Perimeter (Toronto: M&S, 2011; London: Granta Books, 2012), is about associates at Montreal's Brain Research Centre and their traumatic ties to the Cambodian genocide. The novel has been translated into nine languages.

Her novel Do Not Say We Have Nothing (2016), follows the life of Li-Ling, the daughter of a Chinese immigrant, as she becomes the keeper of a mysterious work, the Book of Records, following her father's suicide. The story also focuses on her father and his friends' lives as young musicians growing up in China during the Cultural Revolution.

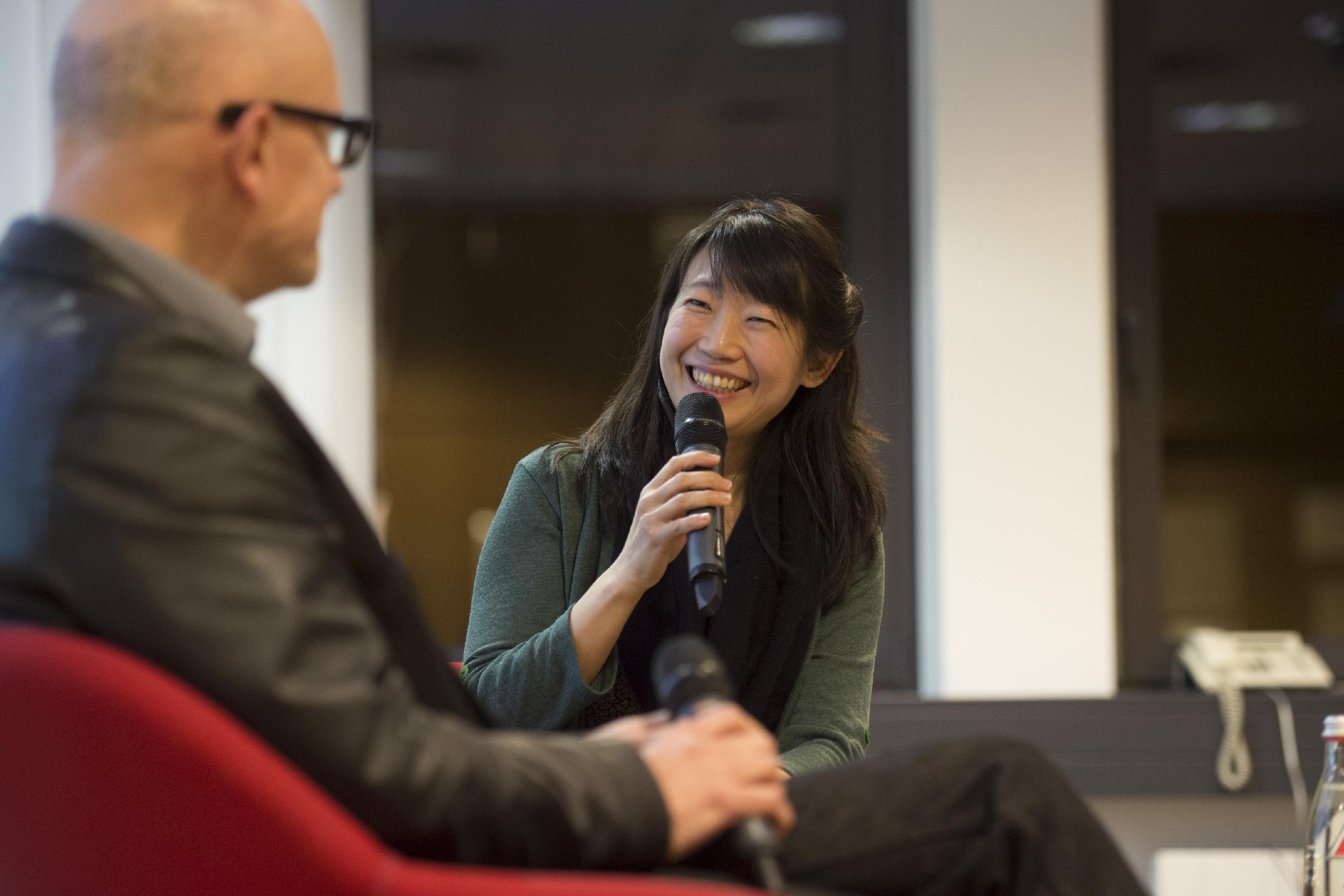
Madeleine Thien in Bonn, Germany, 2015, interviewed by Dietmar Kanthak

Thien's 2025 novel Book of Records is a polyphonic novel that follows a young refugee named Lina and her father as they take shelter in a labyrinthine enclave where the stories of historical figures — including Baruch Spinoza, Hannah Arendt, and Du Fu — intertwine with their own family's past.

=== Academic ===
In 2008, Thien was invited to participate in the International Writing Program at the University of Iowa, and the IWP State Department-funded 2010 study tour of the United States, which invited eight international writers, including Kei Miller, Eduardo Halfon, Billy Kahora and Khet Mar, to explore the unresolved legacies of American history. Her essay "The Grand Tour: In the Shadow of James Baldwin" concludes the 2015 essay collection, Fall and Rise, American Style: Eight International Writers Between Gettysburg and the Gulf. The study tour was the subject of filmmaker Sahar Sarshar's documentary, Writing in Motion: A Nation Divided.

In 2013, Thien was the Simon Fraser University Writer-in-Residence. From 2010 to 2015, she was part of the International Faculty in the MFA Program in Creative Writing at City University of Hong Kong. She wrote about the program's abrupt closure, and Hong Kong's crackdown on freedom of speech, in an essay for The Guardian. In 2016, Thien objected to the University of British Columbia's handling of complaints made against Steven Galloway, a professor in the Creative Writing department until he was fired. In a five-page letter, she stressed the importance of due process and asked that her name be removed from all of UBC's promotional materials. She currently teaches in the Brooklyn College MFA Program.

== Awards and nominations ==
Thien's first book, Simple Recipes (Toronto: M&S, 2001; New York: Little, Brown, 2002), a collection of short stories, won the City of Vancouver Book Award, the VanCity Book Prize and the Ethel Wilson Fiction Prize. It received the praise of Nobel Prize laureate Alice Munro, who wrote: "This is surely the debut of a splendid writer. I am astonished by the clarity and ease of the writing, and a kind of emotional purity."

Her novel Certainty (Toronto: M&S, 2006; New York: Little, Brown, 2007; London: Faber, 2007), won the Amazon.ca/Books in Canada First Novel Award, the Ovid Festival Prize and was a finalist for the Kiriyama Prize for Fiction.

Her second novel, Dogs at the Perimeter (Toronto: M&S, 2011; London: Granta Books, 2012), was a finalist for the Hugh MacLennan Prize for Fiction and the 2014 International Literature Award – Haus der Kulturen der Welt. The novel won the 2015 LiBeraturpreis, awarded by the Frankfurt Book Fair and recognizing works of fiction from Africa, Asia, Latin America and the Middle East. Shortlisted authors for the 2015 Prize included Chimamanda Ngozi Adichie, Shani Boianjiu, and NoViolet Bulawayo.

Thien's short story "The Wedding Cake" was shortlisted for the 2015 Sunday Times EFG Private Bank Short Story Award, the richest prize in the world for a single short story.

Her 2016 novel, Do Not Say We Have Nothing, won the Governor General's Award for English-language fiction, and the 2016 Scotiabank Giller Prize. It was also shortlisted for the 2016 Man Booker Prize, the 2017 Baileys Women's Prize for Fiction, and the 2017 Rathbones Folio Prize. In advance of publication in the United States, it was named to the fiction longlist for the Andrew Carnegie Medals for Excellence in Fiction and Nonfiction. It has been translated into 17 languages.

In 2024, she was the recipient of the Writers' Trust Engel/Findley Award for her body of work.

In April 2026, Thien was awarded the 2026 Guggenheim Fellowship in Fiction.

Her novel The Book of Records was longlisted for the 2025 National Book Critics Circle Award in Fiction.

== Personal life ==
Thien lives in Montreal and is the common-law partner of novelist Rawi Hage. She wrote about her close friend, academic Y-Dang Troeung, after Troeung's death in 2023.

== Bibliography ==
- Simple Recipes Canada: McClelland & Stewart, 2001. ISBN 9780771085116
- The Chinese Violin Vancouver : Whitecap Books, 2001. ISBN 9781552852057
- Certainty Toronto : McClelland & Stewart, 2006. ISBN 9780771085130
- Dogs at the Perimeter Toronto, Ont. : McClelland & Stewart, 2011. ISBN 9780771084089
- Do Not Say We Have Nothing London : Granta Publications, 2016. ISBN 9781783782673
- "My Mother, Reading a Novel" in The Women Writers Handbook London: Aurora Metro Books, 2020. ISBN 9781912430338
- The Book of Records Canada: Knopf Canada, 2025. ISBN 9781039009561

== See also ==
- Simple Recipes (short story)
