= Gary Younge =

British journalist, author, broadcaster and sociologist (born 1969)

Professor Gary Younge FAcSS FRSL
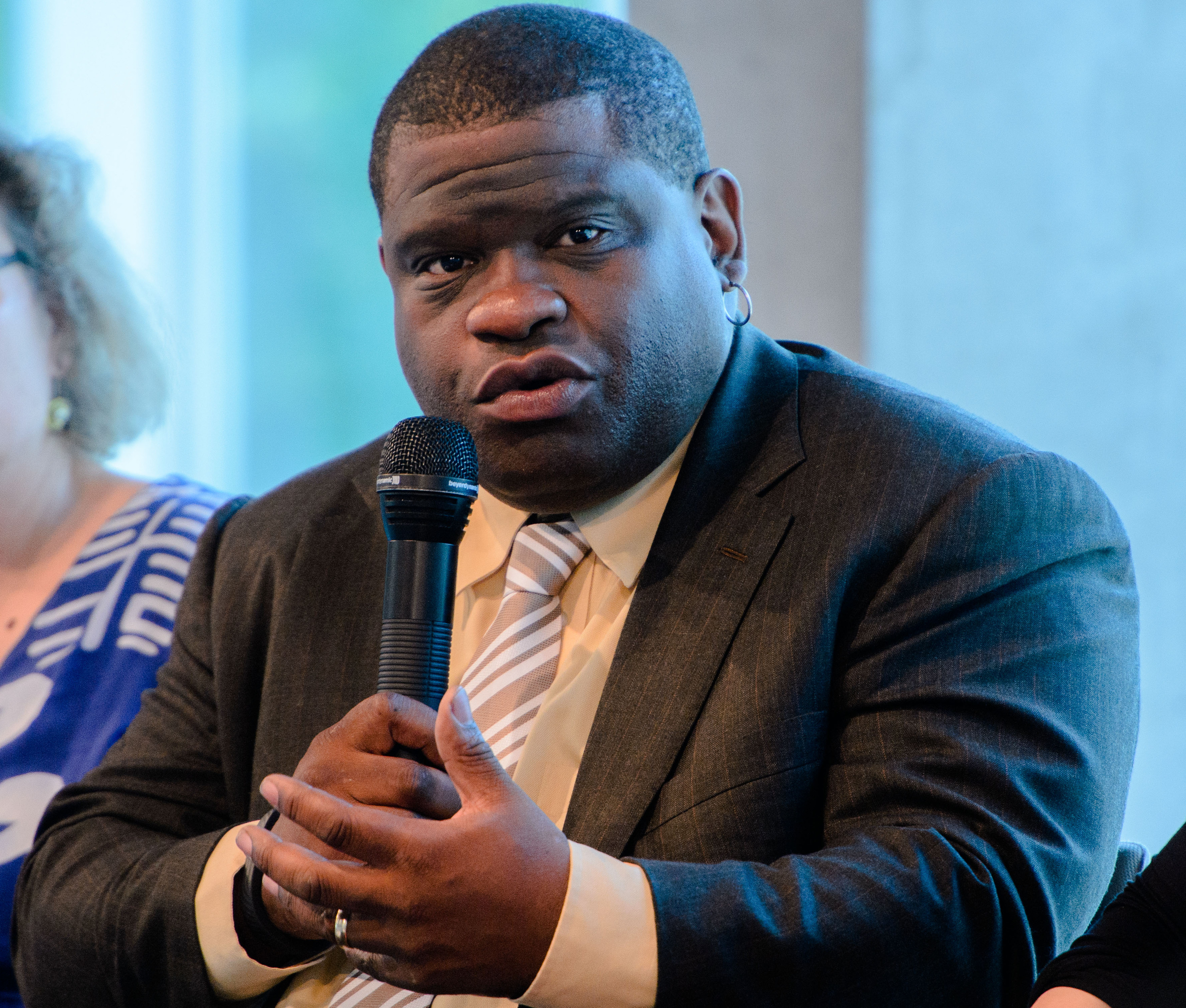
- Younge in 2014
- Born: Gary Andrew Younge; January 1969 (age 57); Stevenage, Hertfordshire, England
- Education: Heriot-Watt University; City, University of London
- Occupations: Columnist; academic; author; broadcaster
- Spouse: Tara Mack
- Children: 2
- Writing career
- Subjects: Racial politics; Left-wing politics
- Notable work: 1. No Place Like Home: A Black Briton's Journey Through the American South (2002); 2. The Speech: The Story Behind Dr Martin Luther King Jr's Dream (2013); 3. Another Day in the Death of America (2016)
- Website: www.garyyounge.com

Gary Andrew Younge FAcSS, FRSL (born January 1969) is a British journalist, author, broadcaster and academic. He was editor-at-large for The Guardian newspaper, which he joined in 1993. In November 2019, it was announced that Younge had been appointed as professor of sociology at the University of Manchester and would be leaving his post at The Guardian, where he was a columnist for two decades, although he continued to write for the newspaper. He also writes for the New Statesman.

Younge is the author of the books No Place Like Home (2002), Stranger in a Strange Land (2006), and Who Are We – And Should It Matter in the 21st Century? (2011), The Speech: The Story Behind Dr. Martin Luther King Jr.'s Dream (2013), and Another Day in the Death of America (2016).

== Early years and education ==
Younge grew up in Stevenage, Hertfordshire, where he was born. He is of Barbadian extraction.

In 1984, aged 15, he briefly joined the Young Socialists, the youth section of the Workers Revolutionary Party, but left a year later after harassment from other party members, including allegedly being accused of working for MI5 and claims that he supported Fidel Castro only because of his ethnicity. At the age of 17, Younge went to teach English in a United Nations Eritrean refugee school in Sudan with the educational charity Project Trust.

From 1987 to 1992, he attended Heriot-Watt University in Edinburgh, Scotland, where he studied French and Russian, and was elected vice president (welfare) of the student association, a paid sabbatical post that he held for a year.

== Career ==
In his final year at university, Younge was awarded a bursary from The Guardian to study journalism at The City University in London, and after a short internship at Yorkshire Television he joined The Guardian in 1993, and has since reported from all over Europe, and Africa, the US and the Caribbean.

His 1999 debut book, No Place Like Home, in which he retraced the route of the civil rights Freedom Riders, was shortlisted for the Guardian First Book Award. His subsequent books are Stranger in a Strange Land: Encounters in the Disunited States (2006), Who Are We – And Should It Matter in the 21st Century? (2011), The Speech: The Story Behind Dr. Martin Luther King Jr.'s Dream (2013), and most recently Another Day in the Death of America: A Chronicle of Ten Short Lives (2016), a "deeply affecting" account of everyday fatalities among young people across the US, which in 2017 won the J. Anthony Lukas Book Prize from Columbia Journalism School and the Nieman Foundation for Journalism. Younge also wrote a monthly column for The Nation magazine, "Beneath the Radar".

In 2019, Younge was appointed a professor of sociology in the School of Social Sciences at Manchester University, writing his last column for The Guardian in January 2020.

Younge was named on the 2020 list of 100 Great Black Britons. In addition, on the 2020 and 2021 Powerlist, Younge was listed among the Top 100 of the most influential people in the UK of African/African-Caribbean descent.

His 2023 book, Dispatches from the Diaspora: From Nelson Mandela to Black Lives Matter, a collection of his journalism covering four decades of reporting from Britain, the US, and South Africa, was described in the New Statesman as "a reminder of how much racism has changed and how much it has stayed the same." It was said by the TLS reviewer to "offer compelling, nuanced reflections on politics, history and culture".

== Personal life ==
In 2011, Younge relocated to Chicago, Illinois, where he lived with his immediate family until returning to the UK in 2015. In 2015, he announced his intention to move to Hackney in London, with his wife and two children. His brother Pat Younge was chief creative officer of BBC Vision, becoming chair of the council at Cardiff University in 2022.

== Awards and honours ==
- 2007: Honorary doctorate from Heriot-Watt University
- 2007: Honorary doctorate from London South Bank University
- 2009: James Cameron Award for the "combined moral vision and professional integrity" of his coverage of the Barack Obama election campaign
- 2015: Foreign Commentator of the Year by The Comment Awards
- 2015: David Nyhan Prize for political journalism from Harvard University's Shorenstein Center
- 2016: Sandford Award, "for radio, TV and online programmes that reflect religious, spiritual or ethical themes"
- 2016: Fellow of the Academy of Social Sciences (FAcSS)
- 2017: Honorary doctorate from Cardiff University
- 2017: James Aaronson Career Achievement Award from Hunter College, City University of New York
- 2019: Honorary doctorate from Mount Holyoke College
- 2020: Powerlist of the Top 100 most influential people in the UK of African/African-Caribbean descent.
- 2020: 100 Great Black Britons
- 2021: Elected a Fellow of the Royal Society of Literature

== Bibliography ==
- No Place Like Home: A Black Briton's Journey Through the American South. Jackson, Mississippi: University Press of Mississippi. 2002. ISBN 9781578064885. OCLC 49226176.
- Stranger in a Strange Land: Encounters in the Disunited States. New York: New Press. 2006. ISBN 9781595580689. OCLC 62421357.
- Who Are We – And Should It Matter in the 21st Century?. New York: Nation Books. 2011. ISBN 9781568586601. OCLC 663952482.
- The Speech: The Story Behind Dr. Martin Luther King Jr.'s Dream. Chicago: Haymarket Books. 2013. ISBN 9781608463220. OCLC 829740195.
- Another Day in the Death of America: A Chronicle of Ten Short Lives. New York: Nation Books. 2016. ISBN 9781568589756. OCLC 945232454.
- Dispatches from the Diaspora: From Nelson Mandela to Black Lives Matter. London: Faber and Faber. 2023. ISBN 978-0571376827.
- "Photobombing de Gaulle: how a forgotten picture rewrites the history of WWII. For the triumphant liberation of Paris in August 1944, black soldiers were kept out of sight. Georges Dukson didn't get the memo". FT Magazine, 3 August 2024.
- Pigeonholed: Creative Freedom as an Act of Resistance, Faber & Faber, 08.05.2025
