= Lily and the Octopus =

2016 debut novel by Steven Rowley

- First edition cover
- Author: Steven Rowley
- Audio read by: Michael Urie
- Language: English
- Genre: Magical realism
- Publisher: Simon & Schuster
- Publication date: June 7, 2016
- Publication place: United States
- Media type: Print (Hardcover); Audiobook; E-book
- Pages: 320
- ISBN: 978-1-50-112622-2

Lily and the Octopus is the 2016 debut novel of Steven Rowley.

== Plot ==
A 42-year-old writer finds that a small octopus has attached itself to the head of his aging dachshund, Lily.

== Background ==
Rowley, a 43-year-old paralegal and screenwriter, had sold several unproduced screenplays before writing a short story about the death of his dachshund, Lily, to cope with his grief. Rowley's boyfriend encouraged him to expand it into a novel. Rowley wrote Lily and the Octopus in 100 days and submitted it to approximately 30 literary agents, who all declined to represent him. Rowley said of the manuscript, "I was proud of it as a piece of writing, but I never thought that this was going to change my life."

Intending to self-publish, Rowley hired freelance editor Molly Pisani, who later pitched the novel to her former colleague, Karyn Marcus of Simon & Schuster. Impressed by the quality of the book, Marcus forwarded it to Simon & Schuster editor-in-chief Marysue Rucci. According to Marcus:

I woke up to an email that [Ms. Rucci] had sent me at 3 in the morning, saying "this book is incredible, I wept real tears, you must buy it" ... We knew immediately it was going to be a big book for us, and the advance certainly reflected that.

In April 2015, Publishers Weekly reported that Marcus had acquired the novel for Simon & Schuster in a "nearly seven-figure" book deal. The Hollywood Reporter noted that the offer "was made with unusual speed", with The New York Observer calling it "a timeline unheard of in the slow-paced publishing industry".

== Publication ==
Lily and the Octopus was published on June 7, 2016.

== Reception ==
Booklist praised Lily and the Octopus as "an exceedingly authentic, keenly insightful, and heartbreakingly poignant tribute to the purity of love between a pet and its human". Publishers Weekly called the novel "sensitive, hilarious, and emotionally rewarding", adding that "in generous helpings of bittersweet humanity, Rowley has written an immensely poignant and touchingly relatable tale". Kirkus Reviews wrote, "In his funny, ardent, and stanchly kooky way, Rowley expresses exactly what it's like to love a dog." Sara Gruen called Lily and the Octopus "A quirky and deeply affecting charmer of a novel [that] is funny, wise, and utterly original in its exploration of what it means to love any mortal creature." Julie Klam of The Washington Post described the novel as "heart-wrenching but ultimately breathtaking", and Garth Stein praised it as "a profound exploration of grief".

In June 2016, Lily and the Octopus made the American Booksellers Association's IndieBound Bestseller List. The Washington Post put the novel on its list of "Notable Fiction in 2016".

== Film adaptation ==
In April 2018, Amazon Studios acquired the rights to develop the novel into a feature film.
