= Medical Anthropology Quarterly =

- Discipline: Anthropology, medicine
- Language: English
- Edited by: Alex Nading

Publication details
- Former name(s): Medical Anthropology Newsletter
- History: 1983-present
- Publisher: Wiley-Blackwell for the Society for Medical Anthropology
- Frequency: Quarterly

Standard abbreviations
- ISO 4: Med. Anthropol. Q.

Indexing
- CODEN: MAQUD5
- ISSN: 0745-5194
- JSTOR: 07455194
- OCLC no.: 09250614

Links
- Journal homepage; Archive via AnthroSource

Medical Anthropology Quarterly (MAQ) is an international peer-reviewed academic journal published for the Society for Medical Anthropology, a section of the American Anthropological Association, by Wiley-Blackwell. It publishes research and theory about human health and disease from all areas of medical anthropology. The purpose is to stimulate important ideas and debates in medical anthropology and to explore the links between medical anthropology, the parent discipline of anthropology, and neighboring disciplines in the health and social sciences. According to the Journal Citation Reports, the journal has a 2019-2020 impact factor of 2.475, ranking it 18th out of 45 journals in the category "Social Sciences, Biomedical".

The current Editor is Alex Nading, Cornell University. Outgoing editor Vincanne Adams will continue to participate in peer review of manuscripts.
