= The Secret Lives of Colour =

2016 non-fiction book

- Author: Kassia St. Clair
- Language: English
- Subject: Art history
- Genre: Non-fiction
- Published: 2016 (John Murray, UK); 2017 (Penguin Random House, USA)
- Publication place: United Kingdom
- Media type: Print (Hardcover)
- Pages: 320
- ISBN: 9781473630819

The Secret Lives of Colour is a 2016 non-fiction book by British writer Kassia St. Clair which explores the cultural and social history of colours. The book, which is based on a column St. Clair writes for British magazine Elle Decoration, is organized in a series of chapters by colour, arranged from white to black. Each chapter is composed of short, two to four page, essays on different shades of its respective color, discussing an interesting aspect of science, history, art, or culture relating to the shade. There are a total of 75 essays in the book. Each page is bordered by a stripe of the colour it discusses for easy visual identification, even when the book is closed.

== Reception ==
The book was generally well-received by critics. NPR listed it on its Best Books of 2017 list. Lily Le Brun of The Economist found the book's design visually appealing and helpful for referencing. Cathy Dillon of The Irish Times called it "perfect gift for a colour enthusiast". Laura J. Snyder of The Wall Street Journal wrote that it brought the history of both science and art "into vivid relief."

Critics responded particularly well to the breadth of subjects discussed. Claire Voon of Hyperallergic found it "diligently researched," and remarked on the topical diversity of the various essays. Ross Stewart of Chemistry World described the vignette structure as an "effective...conceit" allowing St. Clair to "dance effortlessly through an astonishing range of subjects." Lucy Watson's review in the Financial Times was more critical, describing the book as "somewhat fragmented," and expressing disappointment that the book focused on anecdotes without discussing the classification of color as a broad topic.

== See also ==
- Millennial grey
