= JournoList =

Private political discussion forum

JournoList (sometimes referred to as the J-List) was a private Google Groups forum for discussing politics and the news media with 400 left-leaning journalists, academics and others. Ezra Klein created the online forum in February 2007 while blogging at The American Prospect and shut it down on June 25, 2010 amid wider public exposure. Journalists later pointed out various off-color statements made by members of the list denigrating conservatives. Others defended such statements as being taken out of context or simply a matter of private candor.

== Background ==
Ezra Klein controlled the forum's membership and limited it to "several hundred left-leaning bloggers, political reporters, magazine writers, policy wonks and academics." Klein justified excluding conservatives from participation as "not about fostering ideology but preventing a collapse into flame war. The emphasis is on empiricism, not ideology." Posts within JournoList were intended only to be made and read by its members. Klein defended the forum structure saying that it ensured "that folks feel safe giving off-the-cuff analysis and instant reactions." JournoList member and Time columnist Joe Klein said the off-the-record nature of the forum was necessary because "candor is essential and can only be guaranteed by keeping these conversations private." The existence of JournoList was first publicly revealed in a July 27, 2007 blog post by Mickey Kaus.

However, the forum did not attract serious attention until March 17, 2009 when an article published on Politico detailed the nature of the forum and the extent of its membership. The Politico article set off debate within the Blogosphere over the ethics of participating in JournoList and raised questions about its overall purpose. The first public excerpt of a discussion within JournoList was posted by Mickey Kaus on his blog on March 26, 2009.

== Statements on the JournoList ==
Responding to the Jeremiah Wright controversy surrounding Obama's campaign, one JournoList contributor, Spencer Ackerman of The Washington Independent, stated "If the right forces us all to either defend Wright or tear him down, no matter what we choose, we lose the game they've put upon us. Instead, take one of them – Fred Barnes, Karl Rove, who cares – and call them racists". Chris Hayes of The Nation was requesting ideas from other journalists for best ways to criticize Sarah Palin in an email thread.

Ackerman was also quoted as saying, "find a right winger's [sic] and smash it through a plate-glass window. Take a snapshot of the bleeding mess and send it out in a Christmas card to let the right know that it needs to live in a state of constant fear. Obviously, I mean this rhetorically." According to media scholar Jim A. Kuypers, the hatred of conservatives was strong on the list. Sarah Spitz, an NPR affiliate producer, had written that she would "laugh loudly like a maniac and watch his eyes bug out", if she would witness Rush Limbaugh having a heart attack.

== Responses ==
Tucker Carlson, who edited several of Strong's articles about JournoList, wrote in a July 22 article: "Again and again, we discovered members of Journolist working to coordinate talking points on behalf of Democratic politicians, principally Barack Obama. That is not journalism, and those who engage in it are not journalists. They should stop pretending to be. The news organizations they work for should stop pretending, too. ... I've been in journalism my entire adult life, and have often defended it against fellow conservatives who claim the news business is fundamentally corrupt. It's harder to make that defense now. It will be easier when honest (and, yes, liberal) journalists denounce what happened on Journolist as wrong." Fred Barnes, executive editor of The Weekly Standard, discussed JournoList saying, "... hundreds of journalists have gotten together, on an online listserv called JournoList, to promote liberalism and liberal politicians at the expense of traditional journalism."

== Defense of JournoList members ==
JournoList member Jonathan Chait says that "the group as a whole did not jointly participate" in any particular discussion thread. "Almost every discussion was limited to a small percentage of the group that was interested in the topic. Most people ignored most of the topics."

Kathleen Parker, writing in The Washington Post, argued that "perspective is needed here." She stated that comments had "been presented out of context and, besides, were offered as part of an ongoing argument among colleagues who believed they were acting in good faith that theirs was a private conversation." She also referred to JournoList writings as "the private comments of people who, for the most part, have no significant power" and had an expectation not to be 'outed'.

List member Joe Klein wrote at his Time blog, "The views I expressed on Journolist were the views I express here." He identified himself as moderate compared to most leftist members, who subjected his ideas to "onslaughts". He stated that allegations that list members colluded to produce talking points or plan activities with each other are simply false and the group debated with each with members valuing their individuality. He recounted that the only time list members could agree on "joint actions" was "meeting up at some bar."

Foster Kamer of The Village Voice, who was not a JournoList member, has remarked that, emphasis in original, "off-the-record means off-the-record, and an assault on a journalist's right to express him or herself in private is an assault on both the freedom of the fourth estate and free speech in general". Greg Sargent of The Washington Post, a list member, criticized Carlson for not posting JournoList threads in their entirety. He wrote that "publishing them would make it tougher to paint J-Listers as a secretive and omnipotent political cabal, rather than just a bunch of geeks and eggheads venting and arguing about politics".

Ezra Klein recounted Tucker Carlson's effort to become a member of JournoList, which he said he supported, and wrote:

"I want to be very clear about what I was suggesting: Adding someone to the list meant giving them access to the entirety of the archives. That didn't bother me very much. Sure, you could comb through tens of thousands of e-mails and pull intemperate moments and inartful wording out of context to embarrass people, but so long as you weren't there with an eye towards malice, you'd recognize it for what it was: A wonkish, fun, political yelling match. If it had been an international media conspiracy, I'd have never considered opening it up. The idea was voted down. People worried about opening the archives to individuals who could help their careers by ripping e-mails out of context, misrepresenting the nature of the ongoing conversation, and bringing the world an exclusive look into The Great Journolist Conspiracy, as opposed to the daily life of Journolist, which even Carlson describes as 'actually pretty banal'."

== Cabalist spin-off ==
After Klein shut down JournoList, a new group, calling itself "Cabalist" was started by Jonathan Cohn of The New Republic, Michelle Goldberg and Steven Teles, a professor of political science at Johns Hopkins University. The group, which had 173 members by late July, was made up mostly of former JournoList members. Its existence managed to stay secret for several weeks, until The Atlantic magazine correspondent Jeffrey Goldberg revealed its existence in a blog post on July 21. Goldberg reported that one recent discussion concerned whether or not members should ignore the articles on The Daily Caller website. "In other words, members of Journolist 2.0 were debating whether to collectively respond to a Daily Caller story alleging—inaccurately, in their minds—that members of Journolist 1.0 (the same people, of course) made collective decisions about what to write."
