= I Wish My Teacher Knew =

Viral class assignment

I Wish My Teacher Knew is a third-grade class assignment that went viral after its creator shared children's responses via Twitter under the hashtag #IWishMyTeacherKnew.

== Assignment ==
In April 2015, Kyle Schwartz, a teacher at the Doull Elementary School in Denver, Colorado, asked her third grade class to complete a writing assignment entitled "I Wish My Teacher Knew" where they were asked to share something about themselves. Schwartz, aged 26, describes herself as "a suburban girl" and said she created the assignment because she "struggled to understand the reality of my students' lives and how to best support them." She explained that most of her students come from underprivileged (mostly Hispanic) households – 92% qualify for free or reduced cost lunches – and thus she could not easily relate to what they went through in their daily lives. Schwartz has taught at Doull for three years and has done the assignment each year.

Schwartz said the assignment was designed to build trust and a sense of community within the classroom. What she found in the responses was a "raw honesty" in the children's experiences and their vulnerability. The children were given the option of writing anonymously, although most of the students expressed a desire to share their story with the class. The other children in the class rallied around each other in "really beautiful" moments as they shared their stories. A girl who reported she had no friends to play with at recess inspired "all the girls [to huddle] around her and [play] tag" the next day.

== Response ==
Schwartz, describing the answers as "heartbreaking", decided to share some of them via Twitter using the hashtag #IWishMyTeacherKnew. She received an immediate response and other teachers and schools started using the hashtag to share their own teaching experiences. As a result, the tag trended nationally in the United States. Among the most commented on notes were one by a girl whose father had been deported to Mexico and one by a girl with no friends.

The story was picked up by national newspapers and even international sources such as The Sydney Morning Herald. Doull Elementary received numerous donations of school supplies for its students due to answers such as "I Wish My Teacher Knew I don't have pencils to do my homework." The story was featured nationally on ABC World News Tonight, which reported that Schwartz had started a "movement" with teachers across the country copying her assignment to learn more about their own students.

Schwartz has also written a book about the I Wish My Teacher Knew program, I Wish My Teacher Knew: How One Question Can Change Everything for Our Kids, published in July 2016 by Da Capo Lifelong Books.
