= The Index Card =

2016 book by Helaine Olen and Harold Pollack

The Index Card: Why Personal Finance Doesn't Have to Be Complicated
- Author: Helaine Olen and Harold Pollack
- Language: English
- Subject: Personal finance
- Published: 5 January 2016
- Publisher: Portfolio/Penguin
- Publication place: United States
- Pages: 245
- ISBN: 978-1-59184-768-7
- OCLC: 928750850
- Dewey Decimal: 332.024

The Index Card: Why Personal Finance Doesn't Have to Be Complicated is a personal finance book written by Helaine Olen and Harold Pollack that was published in 2016. The book is based on pillars of advice Pollack wrote in 2013 on an index card.

== Background ==
The original image of the index card, posted to Pollack's blog

In April 2013, Pollack interviewed Olen about her book Pound Foolish, and metaphorically mentioned "that the best [financial] advice for most people would fit on an index card.” Pollack further said, "if you're paying someone for advice, almost by definition, you're probably getting the wrong advice because the correct advice is so straightforward."

Emails and comments on his blog asked for a real index card with financial advice, so Pollack jotted down nine rules in two minutes, took a picture of it, and posted it online. The image went viral, and was covered on many internet news sites. Pollack and Olen wrote The Index Card three years later, which Pollack compares with the original index card as commentary to the Ten Commandments.

== Content ==
Olen and Pollack suggest investing in diversified mutual funds, paying one's entire credit card balance each month, having a financial advisor commit to a fiduciary standard, and using Roth, SEP and 529 accounts. The book and index card also contain some "simple" advice, such as saving 10 to 20 percent of one's income, maxing out a 401(k), and not buying individual securities. They also include more "subtle" advice on how to choose and interact with a financial advisor. The book has rules about buying a home and insurance, topics they felt were left out from the first list.

The original index card, pictured above, has:

1. Max your 401(k) or equivalent employee contribution.
2. Buy inexpensive, well-diversified mutual funds such as Vanguard Target 20xx funds.
3. Never buy or sell an individual security. The person on the other side of the table knows more than you do about this stuff.
4. Save 20% of your money.
5. Pay your credit card balance in full every month.
6. Maximize tax-advantaged savings vehicles like Roth, SEP, and 529 accounts.
7. Pay attention to fees. Avoid actively managed funds.
8. Make financial advisors commit to the fiduciary standard.
9. Promote social insurance programs to help people when things go wrong.

== Reception ==
Publishers Weekly said that while the book had an "admirable mission," the rules it advances "are too old and readily available in any listicle to be worth building a book around." It called the book "unsatisfying to all but the most unaware consumers".

Both the book and image received criticism about the last rule, a social safety net, saying that it was more political than financial. Pollack says "that the American taxpayer had my back when I had a crisis", and he "should be doing the same thing for other people", referring to the time when he and his wife took care of his intellectually disabled brother-in-law. He also received emails about his original card from people who could not save the 20% he suggested, so he lowered the number to 10% in the book.
