= Cat Nap (book) =

Children's picture book by Toni Yuly

- Author: Toni Yuly
- Illustrator: Toni Yuly
- Language: English
- Genre: Children's picture book
- Published: 2016 (Feiwel and Friends)
- Publication place: USA
- Media type: Print (hardback)
- Pages: 40 (unpaginated)
- ISBN: 9781250054586
- OCLC: 935106936

Cat Nap is a 2016 children's picture book by Toni Yuly. It is about a sleepy cat having to play hide-and-seek with a boisterous kitten.

== Reception ==
A review in Booklist of Cat Nap wrote, "Yuly's artwork is as sprightly as the tale, which milks all the humor from a situation that mirrors the experiences of a younger and older sibling." Kirkus Reviews was also positive, writing, "The simple text relies on repetition to stress Cat’s futile plight, while bold illustrations use flat, bright colors, basic shapes, and definitive black outlines to amplify Kitten’s successful pursuit."

Cat Nap has also been reviewed by Publishers Weekly, School Library Journal, and Horn Book Guides.
