= Breathe: Stories from Cuba =

- First edition
- Author: Leila Segal
- Language: English
- Publisher: Lubin & Kleyner (Flipped eye publishing)
- Publication date: 2016
- Media type: Print
- Pages: 126 pp
- ISBN: 978-0-9541570-5-0
- Website: www.leilasegal.com

Breathe: Stories from Cuba is a debut collection of short stories written by Leila Segal. Segal was born in London and her short stories originate from her time spent living in Havana and the Pinar del Rio province of Cuba.

The work consists of nine short stories and a glossary for Cuban Spanish terms. The stories are all set in the Cuba of 2000–2004 and demonstrate a sense of everyday Cuban life, particularly regarding familial relationships and loyalty, in order to challenge ideas of exoticism. Segal has also had short stories featured in other publications, including Wasafiri, Ink, Sweat and Tears, Loose Muse, Mima’amakim, and Papeles de la Mancuspia.

== Reception ==
Breathe has been reviewed and discussed on BBC Radio 3's The Verb. The work has also been reviewed positively by Mslexia, which includes an interview with the author. Mslexia describes the collection as 'optimistic' and a 'love letter to Cuba'.

== Stories ==
Six of the stories from the collection are told from non-Cuban, outsider perspectives, often non-specific Western or European voices. ‘Leaving Cuba’ tackles the theme of Cuban youth leaving to join the Western world, guided only by naivety and innocence, with no sense of worldly understanding. Politics makes itself known through the observance of intimate human relationships.

‘I Never See Them Cry’ is an example of Segal’s use of the female narrative voice, highlighting a sense of vulnerability of female travellers and tourists, as well as drawing comparisons between Cuban women and European women. Frustration as a result of clashes of culture is explored when Sarah, an international student at the University of Havana, is invited to stay with her Cuban boyfriend Jabaito’s family. After trial by illness, Sarah begins to accept the foreign mannerisms of the people around her and adjusts to the Cuban way of family life.

‘Sabbatical’ addresses similar themes to ‘I Never See Them Cry’, but draws on the experience of isolation and loneliness whilst living in a country that is not your own. During Carol’s sabbatical she stays with an elderly Cuban woman named Telma. When a misunderstanding complicates the previously good relationship between the two women, Carol gives in to her sense of vulnerability and decides to abandon her experience in Cuba. Segal has written a non-fiction article for the magazine Latino Life on this topic of relationships between Cubans and foreigners being put under pressure by 'the economic and political inequalities'

In ‘Taxi’ the protagonist, Alejandro, confronts his personal frustrations and pride when an elderly American tourist falls ill whilst using his taxi. His vehicle breaks down and the heat causes the woman to faint. Alejandro panics at the thought of police intervention, but must overcome his pride and ignore his job security in order to preserve the woman’s life. ‘Taxi’ deals with ideas of contentment, poverty, and cultural misunderstandings. It also addresses the subject of Communism in Cuba, as seen by an outsider's perspective.

== Contents ==
- Siempre Luchando
- Swimming
- Taxi
- Luca’s Trip to Havana
- I Never See Them Cry
- Sabbatical
- The Party
- Leaving Cuba
- Breathe
