= Another Day in the Death of America =

2016 non-fiction book by Gary Younge

- First US edition
- Author: Gary Younge
- Language: English
- Subject: Violence in society, social policy
- Genre: Non-fiction
- Published: 2016
- Publisher: Nation Books (US); Faber & Faber (UK)
- Pages: 267 pp.
- ISBN: 978-1-56858-975-6

Another Day in the Death of America: A Chronicle of Ten Short Lives is a 2016 non-fiction book by the British journalist and writer Gary Younge. The book focuses on the stories of 10 American children and teenagers, ranging from the ages of nine to 19, killed by gun violence within a 24-hour time period on November 23, 2013. The book follows the lives and deaths of Jaiden Dixon, Kenneth Mills-Tucker, Stanley Taylor, Pedro Cortez, Tyler Dunn, Edwin Rajo, Samuel Brightmon, Tyshon Anderson, Gary Anderson, and Gustin Hinnant.

Younge explores how the deaths are "normal" by American standards—in that none of the stories made national news—but not "normal" by civilized standards. The book was published by Nation Books.

== Film adaptation ==
As of 2016, David Oyelowo was attached to star in the film adaptation of the book. Currently, there is no release date on the film.

== Reception ==
Gillian Slovo wrote in her review for The Guardian: "The stories that Younge has uncovered are often sensational but he tells them without hyperbole and accompanies them with an analysis that lays bare the reality of being black and poor in America". Slovo finishes her review by writing, "Despite the composure of his writing, there is passion in Younge’s condemnation of a system that renders the poor and the dark in America invisible. In illuminating the stories of some of these people and of their communities, Younge has provided us with a beautifully told and empathic account that wrenches at the heart even as it continues to engage the brain." Margaret Busby's review in The Sunday Times described the book as "deeply affecting", also saying: "Younge vividly humanises the statistics, finding out all he can about each child, and trying to connect with the families and friends of the victims, to give context to what brought them to that deadly full stop. ... This might not be a book to make you eagerly turn pages, only because you might need to put it down to catch your breath and marshal your feelings, as one heartrending story follows another." Among other endorsements, Naomi Klein stated: "This is Gary Younge's masterwork. You will never read news reports about gun violence the same way again. Brilliantly reported, quietly indignant and utterly gripping. A book to be read through tears."
