= Helaine Olen =

American journalist based in New York

- Citizenship: Smith College (BA); University of Minnesota (MA)
- Occupations: journalist, author
- Spouse: Matt Roshkow
- Children: 2
- Writing career
- Notable works: Pound Foolish (2012); The Index Card (2016)

Helaine Olen is an American journalist and author based in New York. She is a columnist for The Washington Post and, before that, Slate, where she wrote the column The Bills. She is the author or co-author of three nonfiction books: Office Mate (2007), Pound Foolish (2012), and The Index Card (2016).

== Biography ==
Olen was born in the mid-1960s, and is Jewish. She graduated from Smith College with a BA in English, and earned an MA in journalism at the University of Minnesota.

She is a columnist for The Washington Post and, before that, Slate, where she wrote the column The Bills.

Olen is a contributor to Post Opinions. Her work has appeared in Slate, the Nation, the New York Times, The Wall Street Journal, The Washington Post, Salon, Reuters, Rolling Stone, and the Atlantic. She was a lead writer and editor for The Los Angeles Times’ “Money Makeover” series. She has also appeared on "Frontline," the BBC, NPR, C-Span, MSNBC, "All Things Considered", and "The Daily Show."

Olen is the author or co-author of three books: Office Mate (2007), Pound Foolish (2012), and The Index Card (2016).

She serves on the advisory board of the Economic Hardship Reporting Project.

Olen is critical of the personal finance industry's typical advice to consumers, suggesting that it leaves them unprepared for major downturns such as market crashes, layoffs, and medical bills.

== Honors and awards ==
- Society of American Business Editors and Writers, Best in Business awards, Honorable Mention for Commentary, 2017;
- Society of American Business Editors and Writers, Best in Business awards, Personal Finance, 2016;
- National Women’s Political Caucus, Exceptional Merit in Media Award, 2013
- named one of Business Insider's "50 Women Who Are Changing the World"
- named one of the "Top 30 Most Influential People in Personal Finance and Wealth" by MoneyTips.

== Personal life ==
Olen is married to the screenwriter Matt Roshkow. They have two sons, including influencer and comedian Jake Shane Roshkow.

== Selected works ==
- Losee, Stephanie; Olen, Helaine (2007). Office mate: the employee handbook for finding – and managing – romance on the job. Avon, Mass.: Adams Media. ISBN 978-1598693300. OCLC 145431720.
- Olen, Helaine (2008). "The mean moms". In Shari MacDonald Strong (ed.). The maternal is political: women writers at the intersection of motherhood and social change. Berkeley, Calif.: Seal Press. ISBN 978-0786750757. OCLC 649315093.
- —— (2012). Pound foolish: exposing the dark side of the personal finance industry. New York: Portfolio/Penguin. ISBN 978-1591844891. OCLC 809989018.
- ——; Pollack, Harold (2016). The index card : why personal finance doesn't have to be complicated. New York. ISBN 978-1591847687. OCLC 928750850.
