= MoneyTips =

American personal finance company

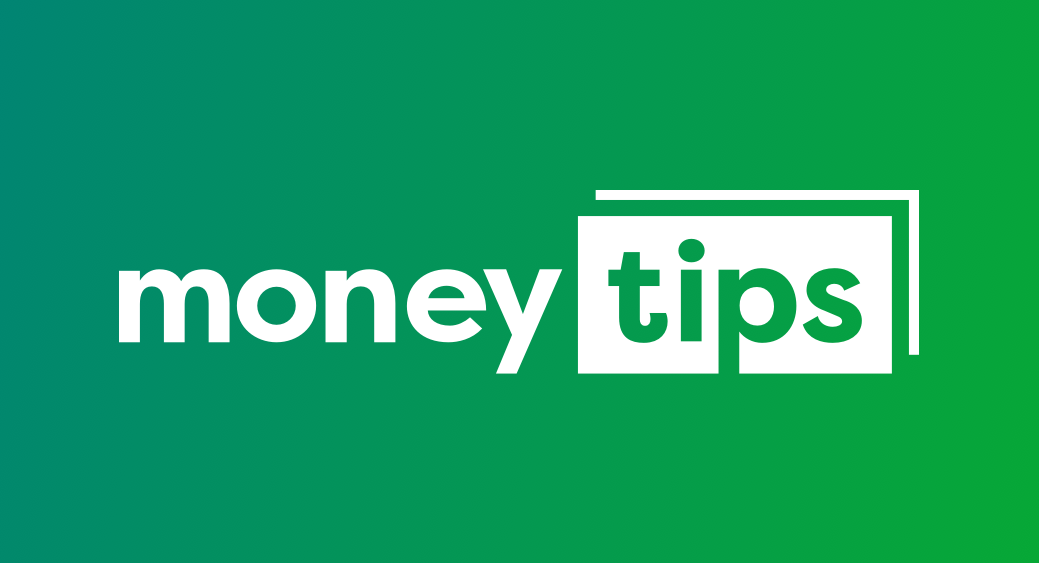
- Company type: Private
- Industry: Financial services
- Predecessor: Credit Card Insider
- Founded: 2012; 14 years ago as Credit Card Insider
- Founders: John Ganotis and Eric Adamowsky
- Headquarters: Syracuse, New York, United States
- Services: Personal finance, Credit Cards, Mortgage, Loans
- Website: www.moneytips.com

MoneyTips is an American consumer education company based in Syracuse, New York. The company provides personal financial information and access to financial products. In March 2022, it merged with Credit Card Insider, another Syracuse-based company that provides information on credit cards.

== History ==
=== Foundation and early years ===
Founded in 2012 by John Ganotis and Eric Adamowsky, the Credit Card Insider website launched in early 2013. The company is located in Syracuse, NY. MoneyTips was created in 2021. In March 2022, the company's Twitter account announced that it was merging with MoneyTips.

=== Scholarship program 2015 ===
In 2015, Credit Card Insider established a scholarship program called the Insider Scholarship to recognize the importance of higher education. The scholarship is for graduating high school seniors and college students. A separate application of 500-1,000-word essay or five-minute video submission about how the student plans to use the award money wisely in order to pursue their higher education is required. Five students are selected for the scholarship money, each receives $1,000.

== Services ==
The company works with different finance industry professionals, in the areas of personal finance, credit, and credit cards. Credit Card Insider editors provide insight based on in-depth research of all the credit cards reviewed by the company. Additionally, the editors publish articles from experts on responsible credit practices. Credit Card Insider author John Ulzheimer is twice Fair Credit Reporting Act (FCRA) certified by the credit reporting industry’s trade association. He is also a credit blogger for Credit Sesame, Mint, and the National Foundation for Credit Counseling. Credit Card Insider reports the interest rates charged by various credit cards, the benefits they provide and recommend specific cards in major categories like student, small business, and secured.

Ganotis has been interviewed by several major news publications including MarketWatch, Business Insider, and Kiplinger to provide insight on a variety of finance and credit card topics.

== Business Model ==
The company website indicates to readers that Credit Card Insider can receive a fee if a user is approved for a credit card that they applied for through the website. A resource for credit related information, Credit Card Insider does not recommend credit cards that are not believed to be beneficial for consumers.
