= Social Anthropology (journal) =

- Discipline: Anthropology, Sociology
- Language: English and French
- Edited by: Laia Soto Bermant and Nikolai Ssorin-Chaikov

Publication details
- History: 1992–present
- Publisher: Berghahn Journals (UK/US)
- Frequency: Quarterly
- Impact factor: 1.639 (2019)

Standard abbreviations
- ISO 4: Soc. Anthropol.

Indexing
- ISSN: 0964-0282 (print); 1469-8676 (web)

Links
- Journal homepage; Online access; Online archive

Social Anthropology (French: Anthropologie Sociale) is a quarterly peer-reviewed academic journal published since 2007 by Wiley-Blackwell on behalf of the European Association of Social Anthropologists. It was established in 1992 and originally published by Cambridge University Press. The editors-in-chief are Laia Soto Bermant and Nikolai Ssorin-Chaikov, russian anthropologist specializing in the anthropology of the gift. Articles are published in English or French.

In 2019, the journal began publishing up to two additional supplementary issues of online-only, special thematic content.

According to the Journal Citation Reports, the journal has a 2019 impact factor of 1.639.

== Editors-in-chief ==
The following people have been editors-in-chief:

- 2020- : Laia Soto Bermant and Nikolai Ssorin-Chaikov
- 2015-2019: Sarah Green, Patrick Laviolette
- 2011-2014: Mark Maguire, David Berliner
- 2007-2011: Dorle Dracklé, Helena Wulff
- 2003-2007: Peter Pels
- 2000-2003: Eduardo Archetti
- 1992-1999: Jean-Claude Galey

== Open access ==
As of June 3, 2021, Berghahn Journals announced that Social Anthropology/Anthropologie Sociale would become part of their open-access set of anthropology journals, starting with Volume 30 in 2022. EASA members "voted overwhelmingly" to leave their existing publisher, Wiley, and "to take our journal Open Access in a way that is sustainable and equitable."

== Abstracts & Indexing ==
The journal is indexed in the following catalogues:

- Anthropological Index Online
- Anthropological Literature
- British and Irish Archaeological Bibliography
- Current Contents
- Expanded Academic ASAP
- InfoTrac
- ProQuest
- Psychological Abstracts
- Social Sciences Citation Index
- SocINDEX
- Web of Science
