= Kassia St. Clair =

British author

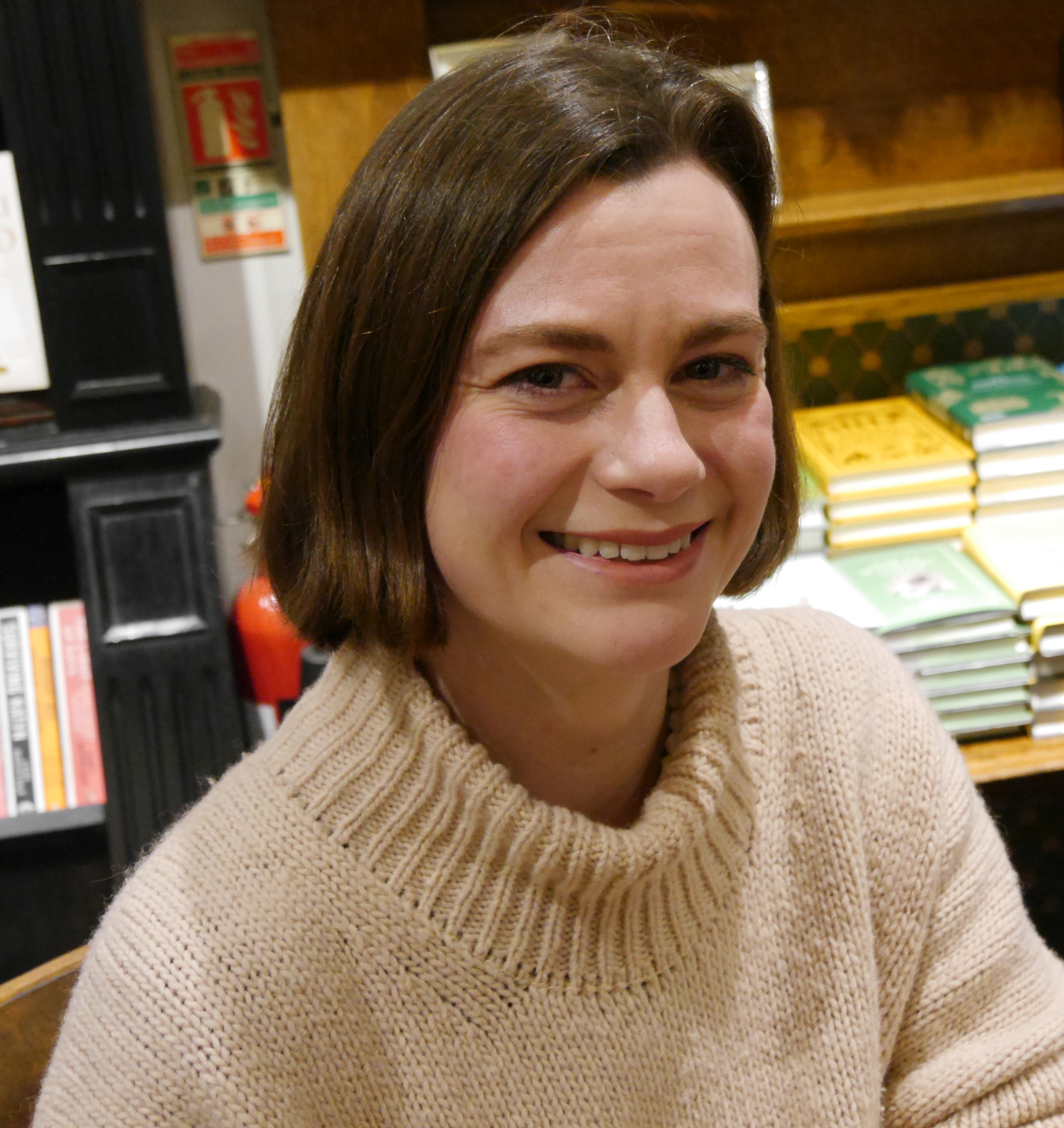
- St. Clair in 2023
- Born: June 1985 (age 41)
- Education: University of Bristol; University of Oxford
- Spouse: Olivier Vidal (m. 2017)
- Website: www.kassiastclair.com

Kassia St. Clair (born June 1985) is a New York Times bestselling British writer and cultural historian. She is best known for her debut book The Secret Lives of Colour (2016). In 2023, she was named Britain's best-selling historian under 40 and one of Britain's top 25 best-selling historians.

== Early life ==
St. Clair graduated with a Bachelor of Arts (BA) in History from Bristol University in 2007 and a Master of Arts (MA) with distinction from Oxford in 2010, where she focused on women's dress and the masquerade during the long 18th century.

== Career ==
St. Clair worked for House & Garden as assistant food and wine editor, as well as Intelligent Life magazine and The Economist. Her debut book The Secret Lives of Colour was published in the UK in 2016 and in the US in 2017. It became a Sunday Times top-ten bestseller, was named a BBC Radio 4 Book of the Week and has been translated into over 20 languages.

St Clair's second book The Golden Thread: How Fabric Changed History, published in 2018, became a Sunday Times Book of the Year and was shortlisted for the Somerset Maugham Award.

Via John Murray Press, St Clair's third book The Race to the Future: The Adventure that Accelerated the 20th Century was published in 2024. The book was selected as one of the Wall Street Journal's books of the summer for 2024 and reviewed in the New York Times, the Spectator, the Telegraph, Literary Review and Kirkus Reviews. It became a New York Times bestseller in September 2026 after the publication of the paperback in the United States. All three books were selected as BBC Radio 4 Books of the Week.

She has written for Elle Decoration, The Economist, Wired, Architectural Digest, the Times Literary Supplement and the Washington Post.

== Personal life ==
St. Clair lives in South London with her husband Olivier Vidal.

== Bibliography ==
- St Clair, Kassia (2016). The Secret Lives of Colour. London: John Murray. ISBN 978-1473630819.
- St Clair, Kassia (2018). The Golden Thread: How Fabric Changed History. London: John Murray. ISBN 978-1473659056.
- St Clair, Kassia (2023). The Race to the Future: The Adventure that Accelerated the Twentieth Century. John Murray. ISBN 978-1324094913.
- St Clair, Kassia (2025). Liberty: Design. Pattern. Colour. Thames & Hudson. ISBN 978-0500028858.
- St Clair, Kassia (2025). Bvlgari: Polychroma. Rizzoli. ISBN 978-8891844484.
