= Out of the Ordinary (play) =

Play by Alex Vickery-Howe

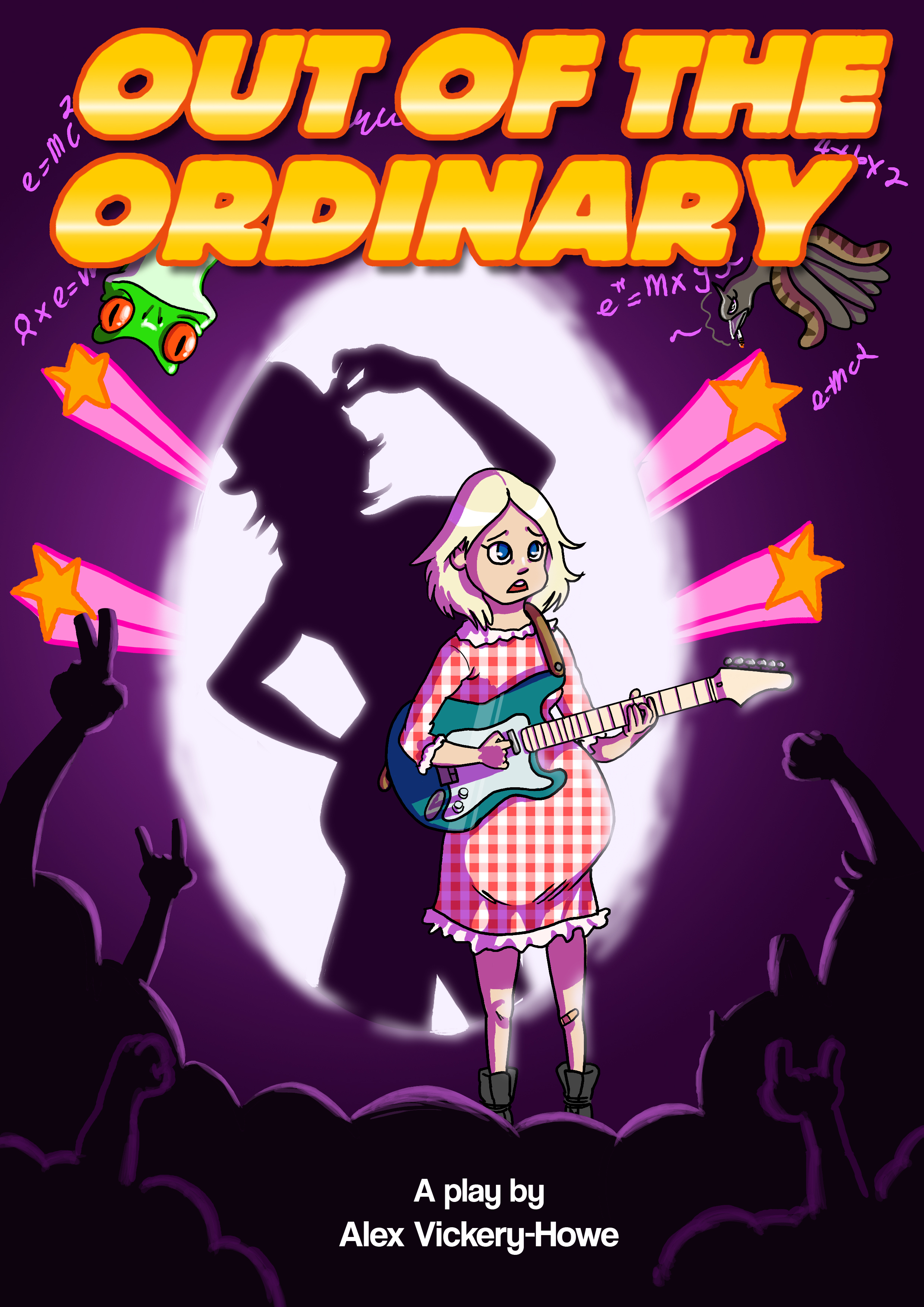
Out of the Ordinary cover

Out of the Ordinary is the fourth play by Alex Vickery-Howe following A Stab in the Dark, Once Upon a Midnight and Molly's Shoes. It was published by Currency Press in October 2016. The play "follows the story of Theodora Sprout, a perpetually defensive, cynical and uptight twenty-something desperate to escape her wild parents".

It was first performed by Accidental Productions at the Bakehouse Theatre in Adelaide, South Australia.

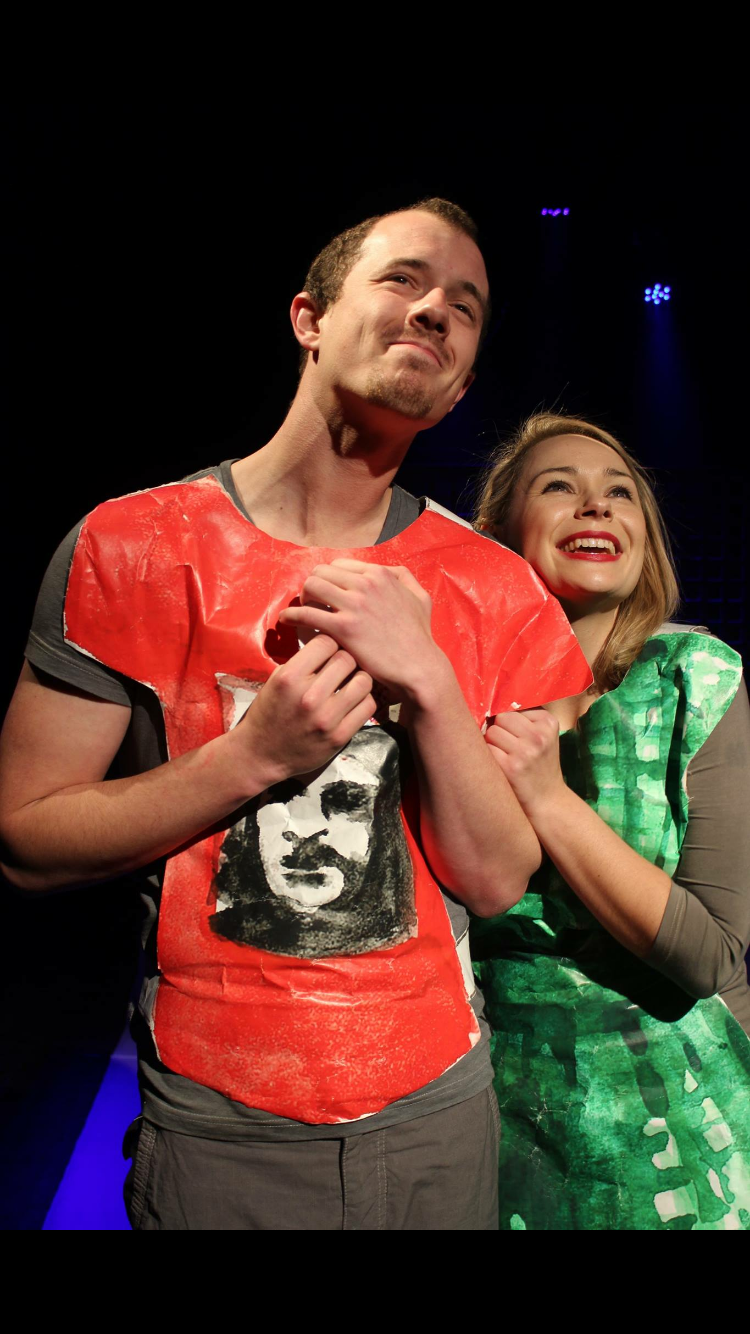
Wallace (Robbie Greenwell) and Anni (Maya Aleksandra)

== Original production ==
=== Cast ===
Steph Clapp as Theordora Sprout, the central character, 'two parts Daria, one part Olive Penderghast. Glasses. Gingham. Feisty attitude.'

Maya Aleksandra as Anesidora Sprout, 'Theo's more vibrant, self-assured twin.' This character has been linked dramaturgically to Jung and the concept of the shadow self, as she may represent that which Theo suppresses in her own nature.

Josephine Pugh as Barbara Sprout, Theo's mother. 'Conservative clothing. Excessive Blush. Generous smile. Her comments are layered with subtext.'

Brendan Cooney as Jasper Sprout, a 'washed-up ex-singer'. He frequently argues with Theo as he is desperate to be seen as 'extraordinary' while Theo wants an ordinary life.

Alec S. Hall as Chad Mombardo, a self-help guru who preys on Jasper. He carries a storm with him and threatens to tear Theo's world apart. He has been compared to the titular character in Tartuffe.

Robbie Greenwell as Wallace Bobbottom, Theo's boyfriend, a wannabe politician. He trolls right-wing chat rooms and believes he is partly responsible for the Liberal Party leadership spill.

Nomakhosi Mpala as Imani Fisseha Azikiwe, aka Figsby, Wallace's best friend. She often flirts with Theo to make Wallace uncomfortable.

Mikayla Lynch as Sasha Flint, Wallace's campaign manager. She is on a nicotine comedown and often beats Wallace with her lollipop.

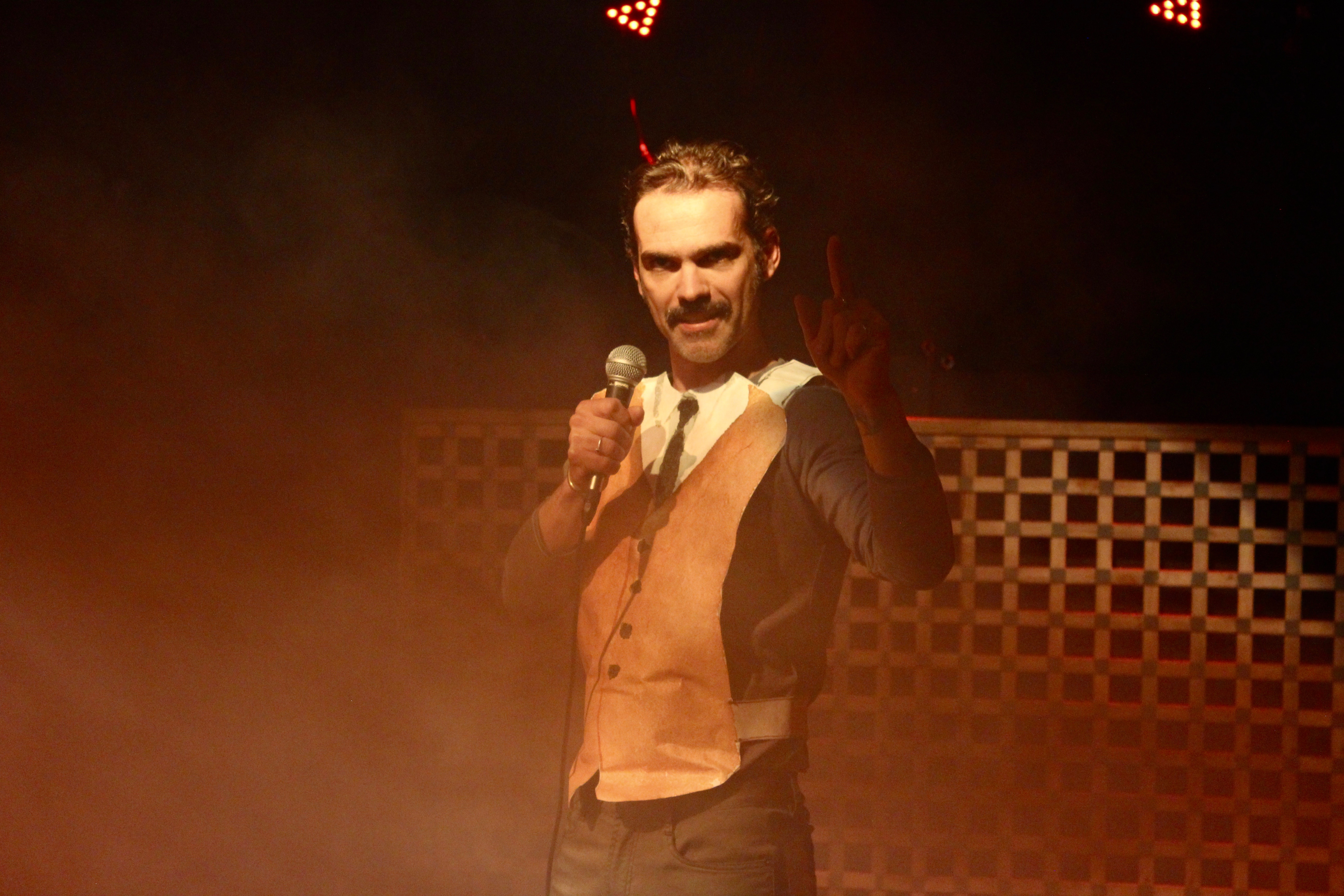
Chad Mombardo (Alec S. Hall)

=== Crew ===
- Director: Joh Hartog
- Set and Costume Designers: Kirsty Martinsen, Alison Stampke, Casey van Sebille
- Sound and Lighting Designer: Stephen Dean
- Stage Manager: Lauren Taylor

== Critical reception ==
The original production received strong reviews. Fran Edwards wrote that "Alex Vickery-Howe has written a fun piece of theatre with lots of laughs, but it does have a couple of serious messages. The attempt to be ‘normal’ is often an expression of the need to be different and sometimes conformity is a bigger demon than difference.' while Jamie Wright praised 'Director Joh Hartog and his cast – particularly Steph Clapp as Theo [and] Robbie Greenwell as Wallace' for 'an excellent job in bringing Vickery-Howe's great dialogue to life; it's fast-paced but never rushed, and all whip out witty comebacks and zingers with perfect comic timing.'

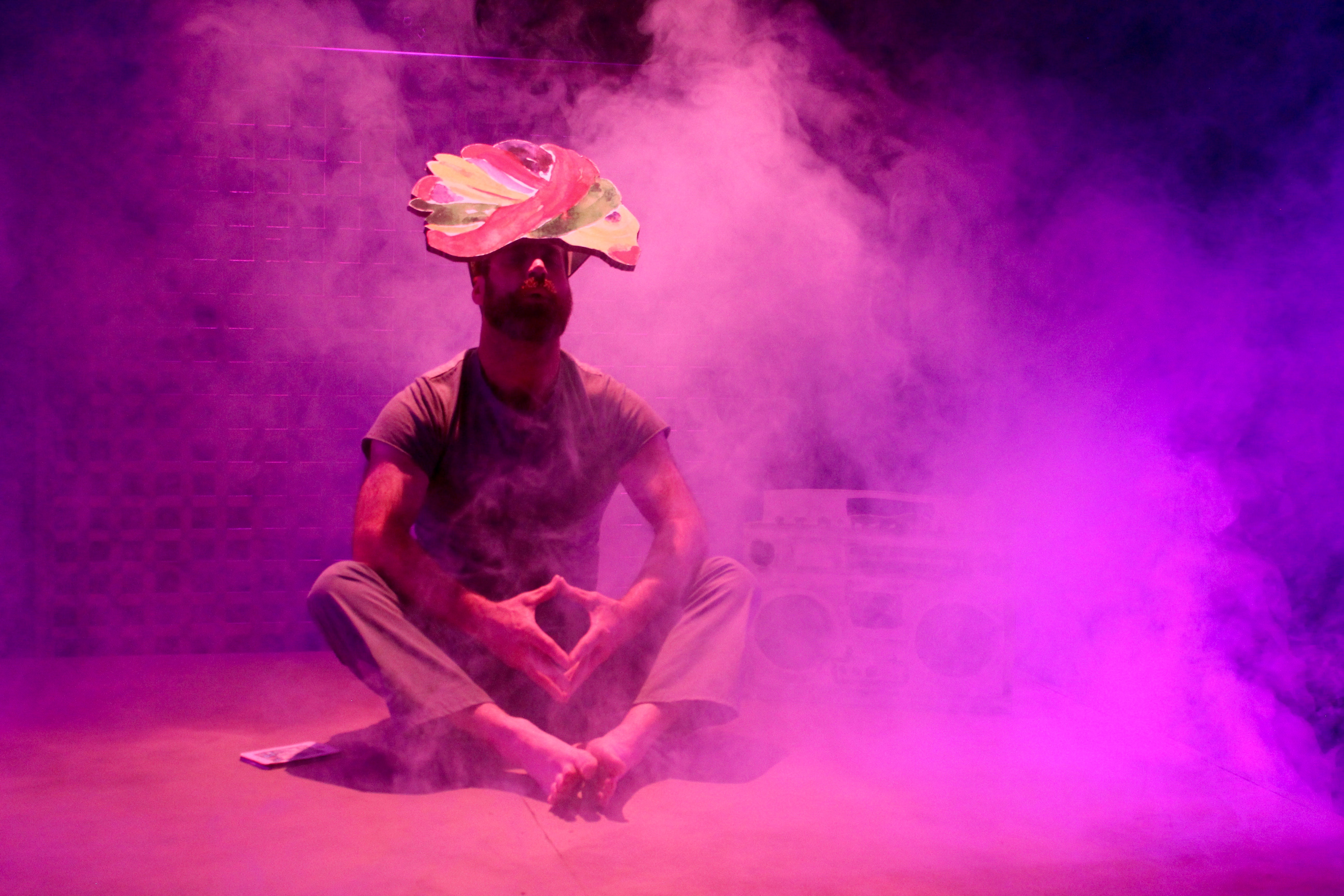
Jasper Sprout (Brendan Cooney)

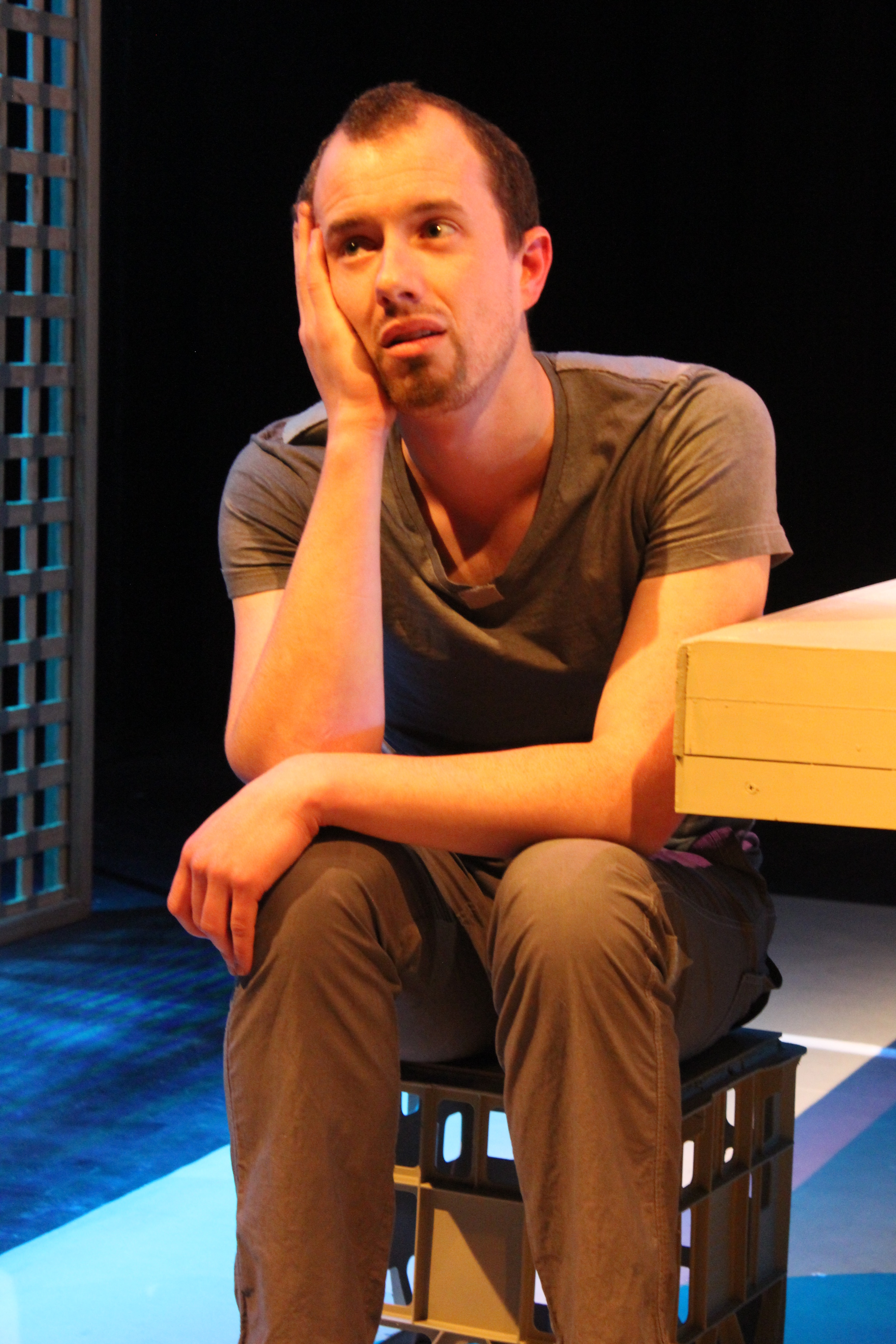
Wallace (Robbie Greenwell)

In her review, Georgina Tselekidis captures the thematic content of the play:

As the story progresses, it’s easy to see this correlation between the characters and our own self-ego. Jasper continues to search for ‘more’ as he feels destined for greatness, something that his family cannot provide him. Always looking to his past and to a time when he was a successful rock god, his life feels ‘ordinary’ now. From following one spiritual conquest to the next, nothing is fulfilling his creative desires, or feeding his ego. He wants approval and self-satisfaction, but don’t we all? It’s something we are undoubtedly left to ponder throughout Out of the Ordinary.'

She adds that 'director Joh Hartog and playwright Alex Vickery-Howe transform a simple context into an ‘out of the ordinary’ interpretation' and that the 'actors were strong and dominant, stealing the show in each of their scenes.'

== Style ==
Like its predecessor, the play experiments with hyperreality by juxtaposing everyday relationships with 'sudden fantasy sequences, musical numbers, cartoonish projections and exaggerated sound effects.' Ivanova (2016) notes the strong influence of manga and anime.

== Academic framework ==
The published play contains an introduction by Maggie Ivanova entitled The Art of Life: Aesthetic Engagements with the Everyday where she discusses the themes in detail, including 'the impulse in contemporary culture to amplify our experiences, no matter how mundane, in order to heighten their emotional intensity and make them worthy of dramatic replay - whether through personal reminiscences, tweets or Facebook posts'. She describes the antagonist, Chad, as a 'Dostoevskian anti-hero' who 'is increasingly harder to like as the play progresses but we simply cannot dismiss what he has to say'.

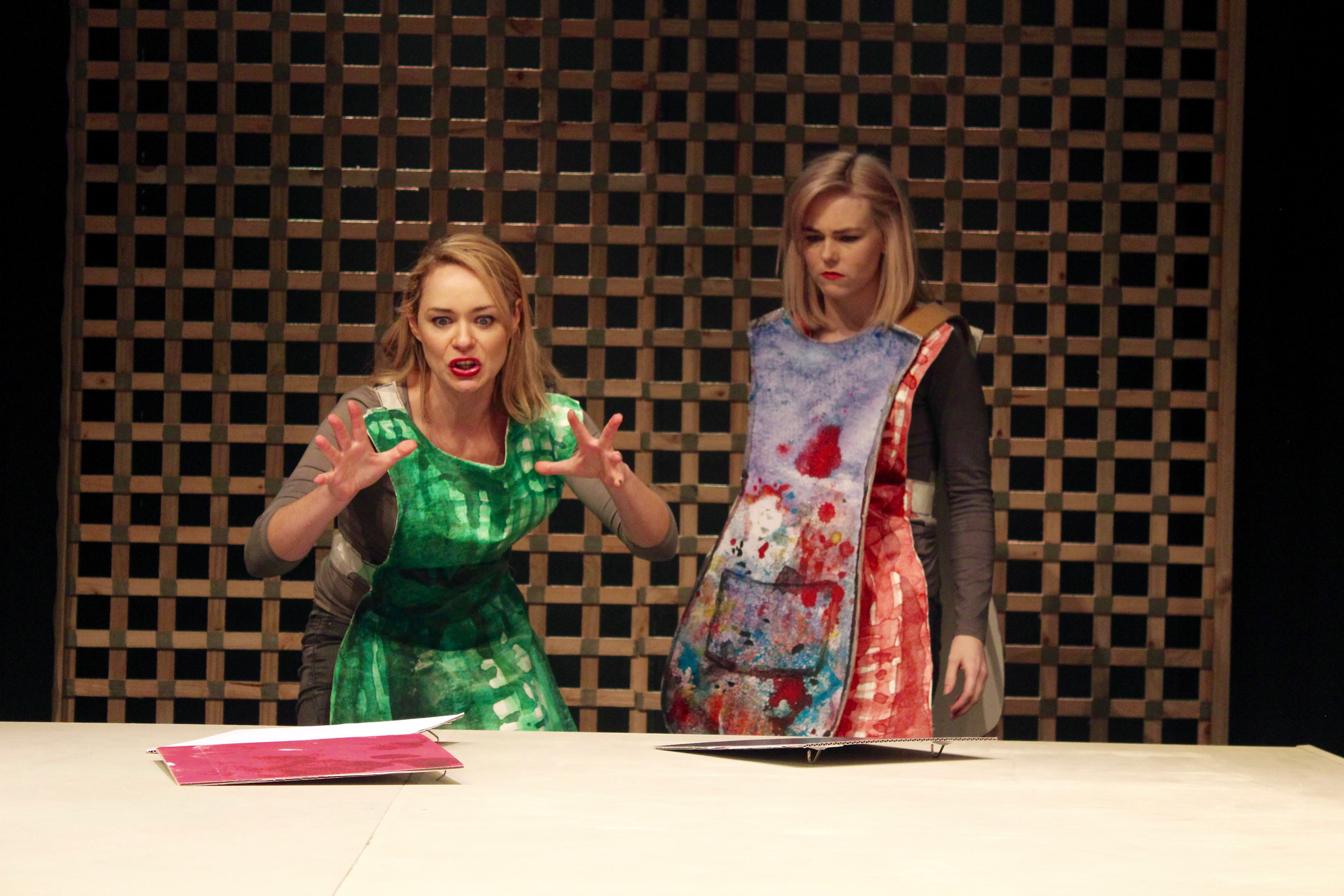
Anni (Maya Aleksandra) and Theo (Steph Clapp)

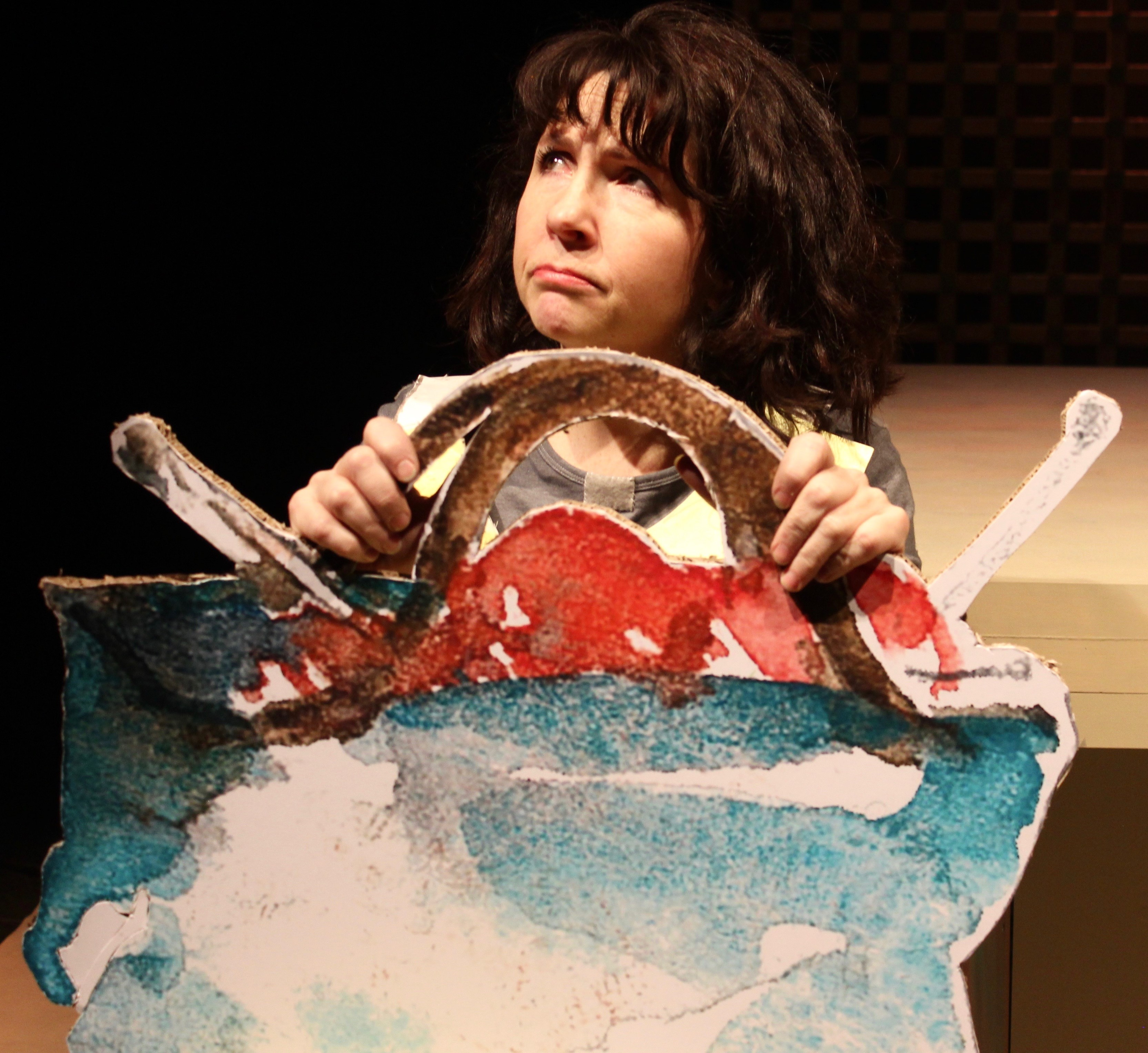
Barbara Spout (Josephine Pugh)

Ivanova frames the relationship between Theo and her unborn daughter Anni as 'hyperreal' resulting from a 'hybrid, multimodal meaning-making relationship between the verbal, the visual and the ambiguous (spiritual, irrational or plain bizarre and inexplicable). A world similar to those we see in comics and manga, which are dramaturgically evoked here, creates a primary reality that serves as a meeting point for separate expressive and experiential planes - Theo and Anni, thought and emotion, word and image, here and elsewhere.' She compares these magical aspects of the play to the works of Lewis Carroll and Haruki Murakami.

In his writer's notes, Vickery-Howe cites What Good Are the Arts? by John Carey as his thematic inspiration.
