= A Stab in the Dark =

A Stab in the Dark may refer to:

- A Stab in the Dark (TV series), a British television programme of topical monologues and discussion
- A Stab in the Dark (play)
- A Stab in the Dark (film), a 1999 Ghanaian film
