= Parklands (film) =

1996 film

- Directed by: Kathryn Millard
- Written by: Kathryn Millard
- Produced by: Helen Bowden
- Starring: Cate Blanchett; Tony Martin; Carmel Johnson; Tony Mack; Patrick Duggin; Bridget Walters; Jo Peoples
- Cinematography: Mandy Walker
- Edited by: Frans Vandenburg
- Music by: Richard Vella
- Release date: 1996
- Running time: 51 minutes
- Country: Australia
- Language: English

Parklands is a 1996 Australian drama film written and directed by Kathryn Millard, starring Cate Blanchett in her first film role.

== Plot summary ==
When Rosie's father Cliff suddenly dies of a heart attack, she returns home to Adelaide to attend his funeral. After meeting Jean, the woman Cliff left Rosie's mother for, she discovers Cliff’s police diaries. In a search for the truth about her father, Rosie becomes increasingly convinced that he was corrupt – a revelation that is at odds with her childhood memories of him.

== Cast ==
- Cate Blanchett as Rosie
- Tony Martin as Cliff
- Carmel Johnson aa Jean
- Tony Mack as Dave Morrison
- Patrick Duggin as Andrew
- Bridget Walters as Mrs. Roberts
- Jo Peoples as Elizabeth
- Corrinne Ammerlaan
- Stephan Sapio
- Lyle Murphy

== Production ==
The 51-minute-long film includes Chamber of Commerce-style promotional material about Adelaide that was made in the 1950s and '60s.

The film was written and directed by Kathryn Millard and produced by Helen Bowden for Too Toi Films, with cinematography by Mandy Walker. The music was composed by Richard Vella with production design by Prisque Salvi.

On writing the project, Millard said: "I began research and writing the project in the early 1990’s. Its writing process might best be described as a search for form. I began by writing a feature length thriller, drawing heavily on research into the corruption in police forces in the 1980s, especially the South Australian Police Force. Reviewing the first draft, however, I found that the conventions of the genre had not allowed me to explore fully the ideas, images and dramatic scenarios that had initially inspired the project. Re-conceiving the project as essayistic fiction, I began again by writing a treatment that collaged key images and excerpts from a policeman’s diaries and place and character. It even included notes about writing and the term I had borrowed from Wenders, ‘broken stories’. The next stage of the development of Parklands involved further research into settings, characters and colour palettes. I compiled lists, from the favourite foods of the central character through to a chronology of the cars that he had owned in the course of his life. As part of this development phase, I wrote an essay Morris Blue. I fed images and ideas back forth from the essay and the script. In Parklands voiceover narration, I drew on the image of patrolling. This process was not only designed to generate new images and possibilities for scenes, but to keep the project imaginatively alive through what I anticipated would be a lengthy process of development and fund raising. Although the script subsequently went through many formal drafts in order to raise production funds, the initial collage of images and fragments of text became the document to which I returned over and over throughout the production, considering the film’s, look, design and shape an in working with the actors. Parklands further fuelled my interest in less traditional scripting processes."

=== Filming locations ===
Filming locations included Adelaide Botanic Gardens (opening shots), Semaphore (shoreline scenes), Main North Road, Hindley Street, Gouger Street (including the former Gouger Street Fish Café) and Adelaide CBD (including the Santos building).

== Release ==
The film screened at the Mill Valley Film Festival in 1996. It was then shown at the 1997 — Golden Gate Awards in San Francisco and the 1997 St Kilda Film Festival.

== Reception ==
Film critic Margaret Pomeranz from SBS’s The Movie Show referred to the film as an “elusive, tantalising story”, praising the work of cinematographer Mandy Walker and calling Carmel Johnson's performance a “standout". The Sydney Morning Herald called the film a “potent mix of mood and mystery”, and an "object lesson in turning a low budget into a virtue."

Barbara Creed from The Age said: "Director Kathryn Millard (Light Years) imaginatively interweaves the tale of a daughter’s disturbing search for the truth about her father, with a second stratum of storytelling – an investigation of place. By intercutting often hilarious TV ads of the 1950s about happy family life and civic virtues, Millard carefully constructs another image of the past that is clearly at odds with her personal memories. Is Adelaide a city of ordered gardens and neat parks, or a place where boundaries between light and shade, innocence and corruption are blurred? This personal, imaginative film relies on mood rather than strong narrative. Blanchett’s performance is finely nuanced and the direction is strong."

Vicky Roach of The Daily Telegraph gave the film a rating of 7 out of 10, saying: "Parklands is the cinematic equivalent of flicking through somebody’s family album. The experience is so intimate, it’s almost like eavesdropping on a private conversation. Millard is obviously on intimate terms with the faded, ’60s suburban dream, the neatly clipped lawns and well-pruned rose bushes, and she paints it with a keen and sympathetic eye. But Parklands is far from being an exercise in gentle nostalgia. At heart, it’s a kind of personal mystery story, where ghosts lurk in the shadows and one is never quite sure whether the danger is psychological or physical. Cate Blanchett plays Rosie with intense understatement and Tony Martin is solidly familiar as an old-style detective.

== Awards and nominations ==
Date	Award	Category	Recipient	Result	Ref.
1996	Australian Film Institute Awards	Best Cinematography in a Non-Feature Film	Mandy Walker	Won	
1997	Australian Cinematographers Society	Award of Distinction	Mandy Walker	Won	
1997	Golden Gate Awards – San Francisco International Film Festival	Certificate of Merit for Film & Video – Short Narrative III (31–60 minutes)	Kathryn Millard	Won	
	Cinanima – Animated Film Fest of Espinho	Best Film	Kathryn Millard	Won	
	Cinemagic Animation Film Festival	Grand Prize	Kathryn Millard	Won	
	Hiroshima Animation Film Festival	Jury Award	Kathryn Millard	Won	

== See also ==
- Cinema of Australia
