= Once Upon a Midnight =

- Poster for the Adelaide production
- Music: Tim Lucas
- Lyrics: Tim Lucas and Alex Vickery-Howe
- Book: Alex Vickery-Howe
- Productions: 2008 Okinawa City; 2008 Adelaide

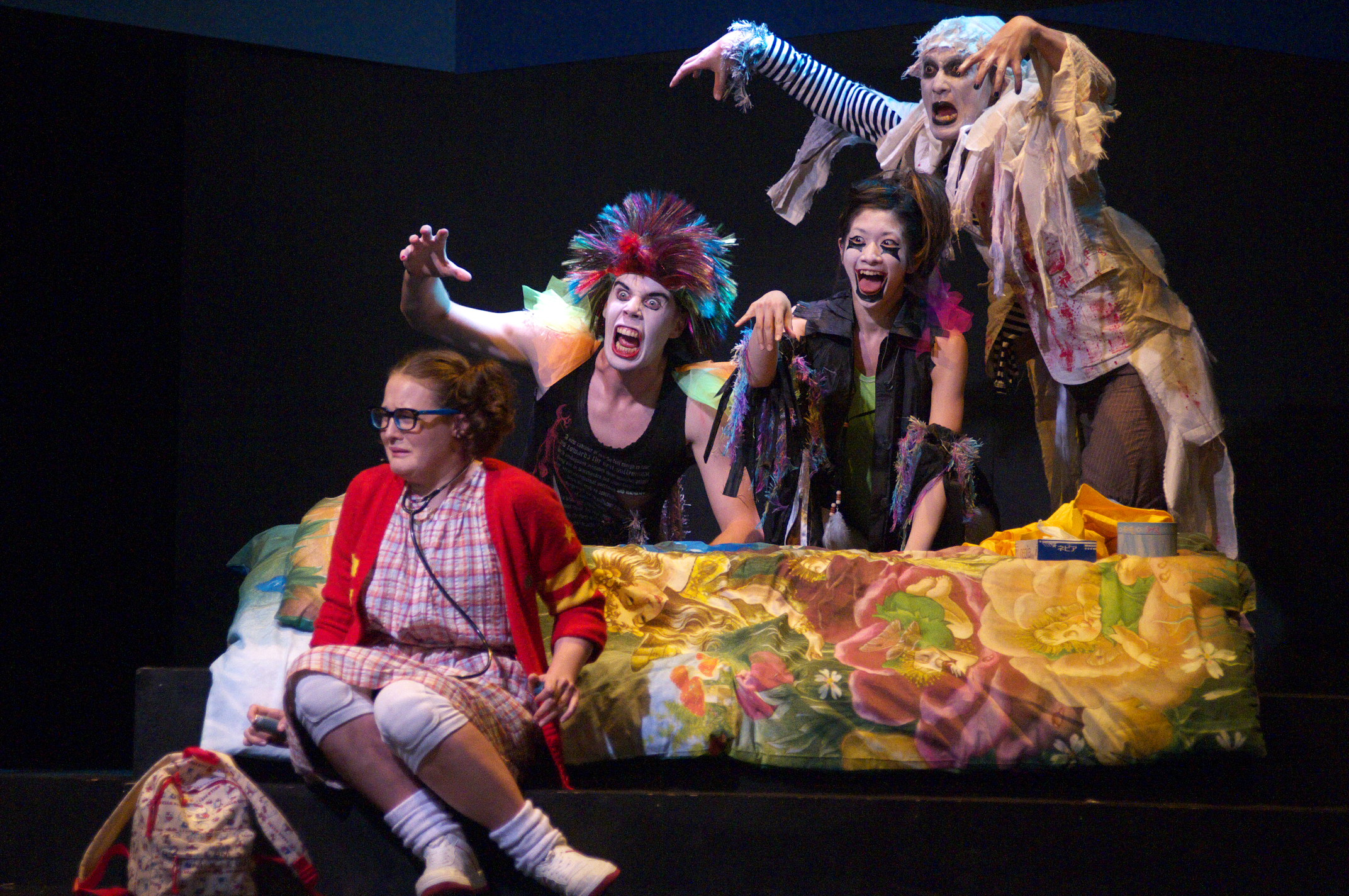
Kelsey and the Vultures

Once Upon a Midnight is a Japanese/Australian rock musical. The script is bilingual, featuring seven Japanese performers and seven Australian performers. It follows the adventures of Kelsey Clarke and the warrior doll Nozomi as they journey to the Underground to liberate the monster world from the mysterious Angelica.

The show was first performed at the Kijimuna Festival in Okinawa, Japan, and later appeared as a headline act at the OzAsia Festival in Adelaide, South Australia. It was a collaboration between the Kijimuna Festival, the Drama Centre at Flinders University and Adelaide Festival Centre.

== Synopsis ==
Kelsey Clarke is very afraid. She is afraid of germs, she is afraid of traffic...even the toaster makes her feel very afraid.

Deep in the Underground, the monsters are afraid too. Angelica, the Blue Fairy, has flown into their world. No longer will the monsters be allowed to terrify unsuspecting children, no longer can they drink blood and dance the night away.

Powerless to confront Angelica, the Tengu — Lord of the Underground — has no choice but to find the world's most frightened child and teach her to confront her fear. For timid Kelsey, this means putting on her best cardigan and plunging headlong into the monster kingdom — from murky swamps to haunted Ghost Roads!

With an enchanted doll and a vegetarian vampire to guide her, Kelsey touches her darker side. But is becoming her own nightmare any better than cowering alone under blankets? Can Kelsey summon the courage to find her true self, face her demons and stand against the magical Angelica? Or will the sun rise forever on a future where only the fearful survive?

== Intercultural Significance ==
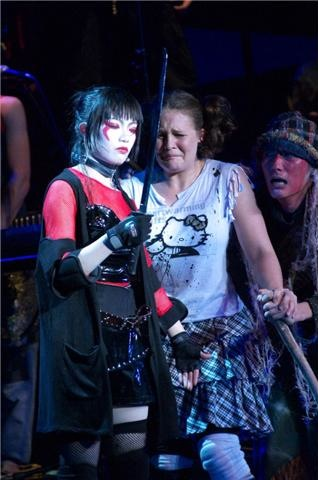
Kelsey meets Nozomi

Director Catherine Fitzgerald claimed in Rip It Up magazine that Once Upon a Midnight has a metaphorical base

"It works on many levels. Is it about a young kid with fear who gets kidnapped by monsters? Or is it something else? Is it about the war on terror? There are a lot of things layered into the story."

The show was written in equal parts English and Japanese, with Australian playwright Alex Vickery-Howe working closely with Japanese translator Ken Yamamura. The combination of languages posed interesting challenges. Quoted in Lowdown Magazine, Yamamura said

"... the sense of humour is completely different and also the words we use [in English] for the humour [is completely different]. So I translated literally with description and [the Japanese cast] still didn't find it funny so I had to come up with something equivalent to that joke to find the Japanese understanding."

Vickery-Howe added

"Sarcasm is lost. I offended a lot of people just being myself... it's that Australian thing of saying 'I hate you' but really meaning 'I like you' which is taken literally."

Journalist Ursula Beaumont goes on to note that

"Targeting teenage audiences with an experience that introduces 'the other' in a fun, positive, familiar way with the monsters crossing the cultural divide, is a refreshing approach to gaining understanding of another culture. What's more, it's a young bi-cultural cast strutting their stuff, making the production a unique work..."

Speaking to the Helpmann Academy's Arts Magazine actor Matthew Crook reflected on the experience of working interculturally

"Performing Once Upon a Midnight in Japan has been an overwhelming experience and certainly unforgettable. No matter how much or how little we spoke each other's language, I found there was always an indescribable connection."

== Critical reception ==
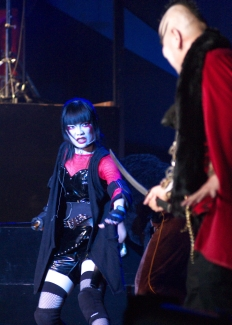
Nozomi vs Yoshiki

In his four out of five review "Battle Lines are Drawn", Matt Byrne described the show as a "head-on mix of Japanese and English dialogue and lyrics as the characters alternate languages. Sounds crazy, and sometimes it is. But somehow it works, thanks to its inexhaustible ensemble."

In his enthusiastic review for Rip It Up, Barry Lenny praised Mai Kakimoto for her "standout performance" as Nozomi and described the show as both "superb" and "a high energy, fast-paced work that captures the imagination" noting "influences of Noh, Kabuki, Butoh and even Bunraku in evidence."

Youth reviewer Sam Ryan said "Not only was Once Upon a Midnight an excellent example of cross cultural collaboration and exchange, it was also pure fun all the way through" while Richard Flynn for the Adelaide Theatre Guide praised the use of both Japanese and English in the text, saying "they have no need of surtitles! All is clear enough, and very clever!", adding "Will Kelsey Clarke conquer the night, her seemingly boundless fears of germs, her big brother, traffic, and all the people in the world who are not ‘like her’? She and her friends certainly conquered one Adelaide Opening Night audience!"

=== Reviews and articles ===
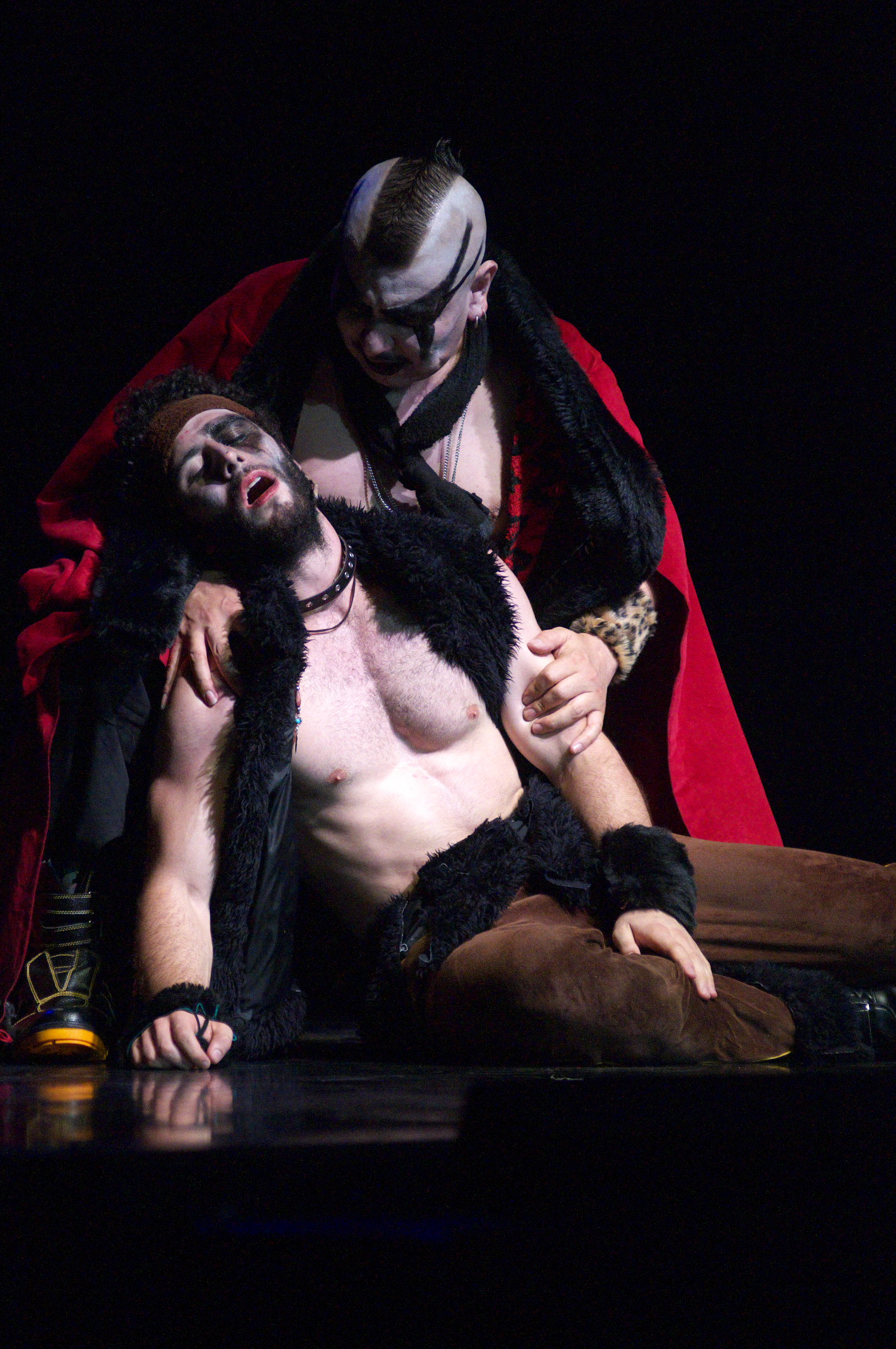
Yoshiki mourns Scratch

- SA Life, September 2008, "Found in Translation" by Lance Campbell
- DB Magazine, Issue 448, pg. 4 Theatre Guide, by Alex Wheaton
- Update Arts Magazine, Vol 15, No 3, Issue 61, pg. 6, "Once Upon a Midnight", by Matthew Crook
- Guardian Messenger, Sep 17 2008, pg. 48, "Rock and Scares in the Midnight Hour" by Melissa Phillips
- The Advertiser, Sept 13 2008 "Mythology of Two Cultures" by Tim Lloyd
- Adelaide Matters, Issue 102, Sept 10-Oct 7, 2008, pg. 12/13 "Cultural Ties" by Catherine Clifton and Kylie Fleming
- Rip it Up, Sept 11 2008, "Once Upon a Midnight", by Robert Dunstan
- The Journal of The Asian Arts Society of Australia Vol 18, No 2, June 2009, pg.20/21 by Alex Vickery-Howe

== Song list ==
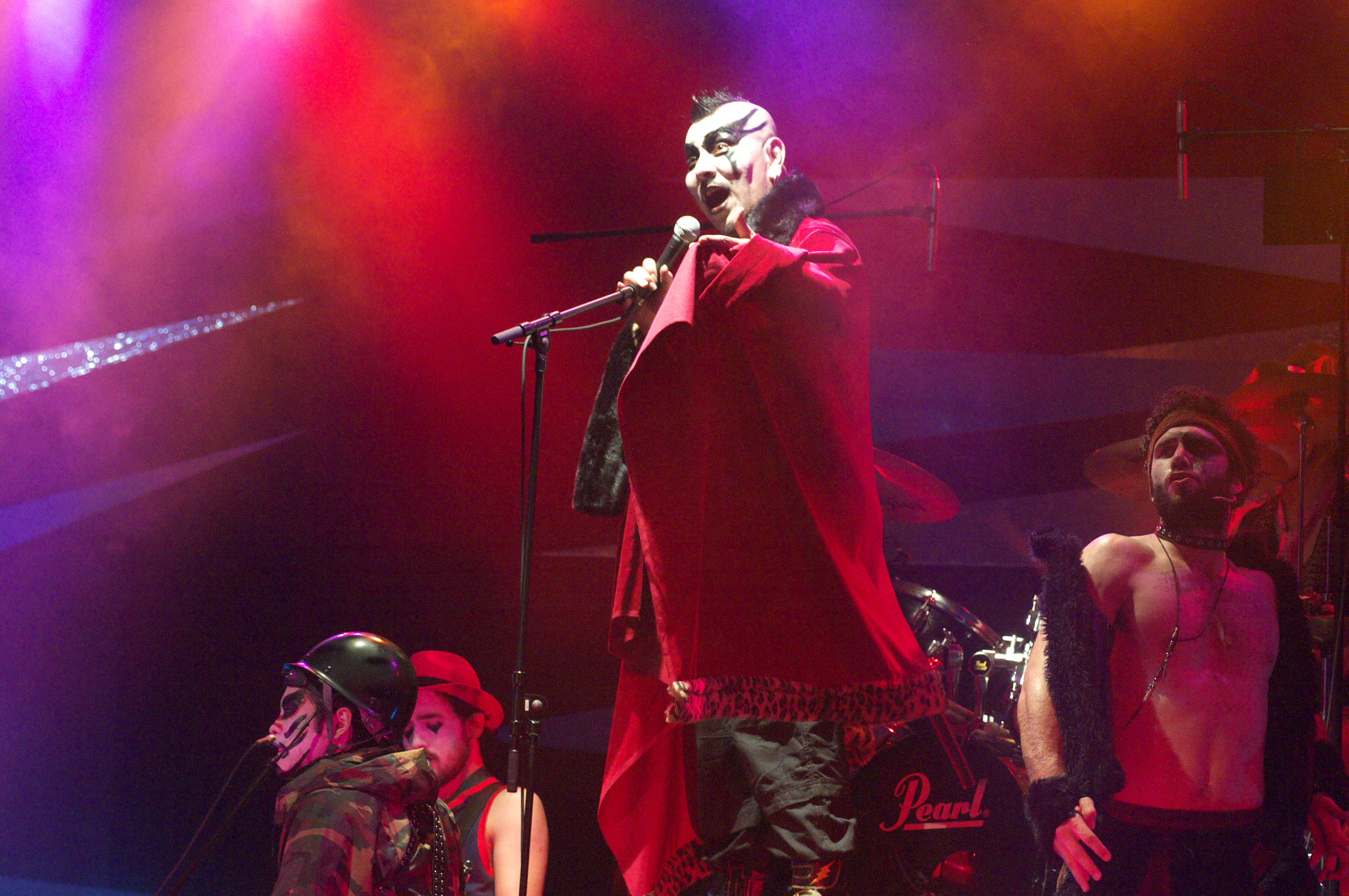
Publicity photo: ‘Bring on the Night’

Bring on the Night: Yoshiki, Scratch, Kango, Tweetles and the Vultures

Frightened of the World: Kelsey

Dance, Monster, Dance: Kango

Into the Dark: Nozomi, Scratch, Kelsey, Yoshiki, Ryan, Leiko, Tweetles and the Vultures

Hot Red Sugar: Damon, Zombies

Taming of the Wolf: Scratch, Angelica

Make Believe: Kelsey, Damon, Shima, Ryan, Yoshiki, Nozomi, Tweetles and the Vultures

Close Your Eyes: Angelica

The Night is Ours Again: Company

== Cast ==
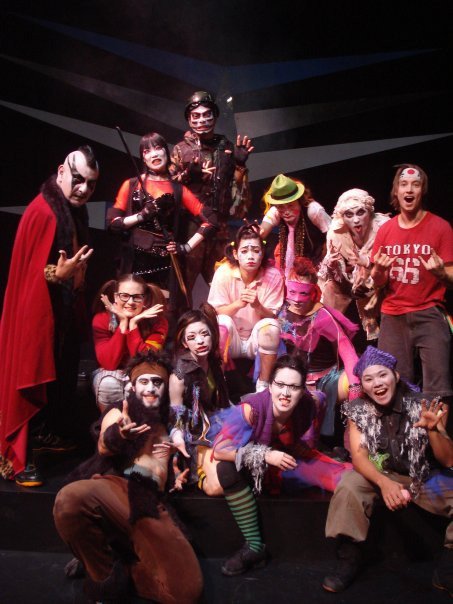
Cast

=== Monsters of the Underground ===
Nozomi, the Ningyō: Mai Kakimoto
Angelica, the Blue Fairy: Michelle Pastor
Shima, the Kijimuna: Shusaku Uchida
Yoshiki, the Tengu: Tenchou
Kango, the Kappa: Shimabukuro Hiroyuki
Damon, the Vampire: David Hirst
Scratch, the Werewolf: Chris Asimos

=== People of Earth ===
Kelsey, a fourteen-year-old girl: Lauren Henderson
Ryan, her brother, sixteen: Matthew Crook
Leiko, a toddler: Keiichi Yonamine

=== The Vultures ===
Tweetles: Melissa Matheson
Flopsy: David Hirst
Bedlam: Michelle Pastor
Kowashimashou: Shusaku Uchida
Zuru-Zuru: Keiko Yamaguchi
Hiyokko: Ken Yamamura

== Production credits ==
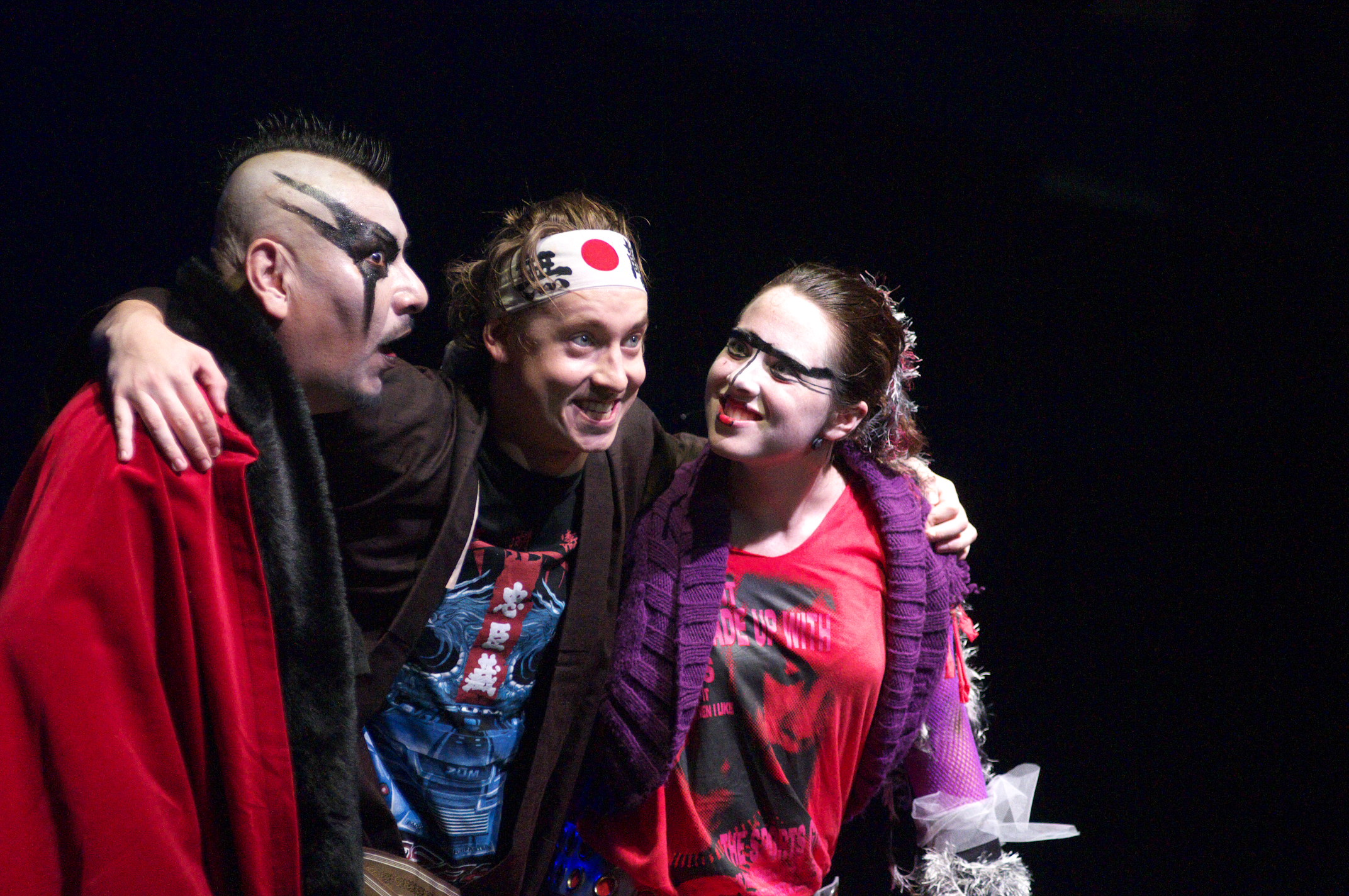
Publicity photo: Yoshiki, Ryan and Tweetles

Director: Catherine Fitzgerald
Choreography: Yumi Umiumare
Assistant Director: Momoko Iwaki
Costume Design: Oka Kazuyo

Dramaturg: Julie Holledge
Set Design: Naomi Steel
Design consultant: Mary Moore
Stills Photographer: Tomoaki Kudaka
Music consultant: Stuart Day
Sword Fight Choreographer: Tuyoshi China

Lighting Designer (Japan): Yoshimi Sakamoto
Lighting Designer (Australia): Fred Schultz
Stage Manager (Australia): Maj Green
Production Manager (Australia): Andrew Bailey
Set Construction (Australia): Glen Finch

Book Translation (to Japanese): Ken Yamamura with Yumi Umiumare
Lyrics Translation (to Japanese): Ken Yamamura, Yumi Umiumare, Keiko Yamaguchi, and Mai Kakimoto

Produced by Hisashi Shimoyama, artistic director of the Kijimuna Festival, and Professor Julie Holledge, Flinders University Drama Centre.
