= Molly's Shoes =

Play by Alex Vickery-Howe

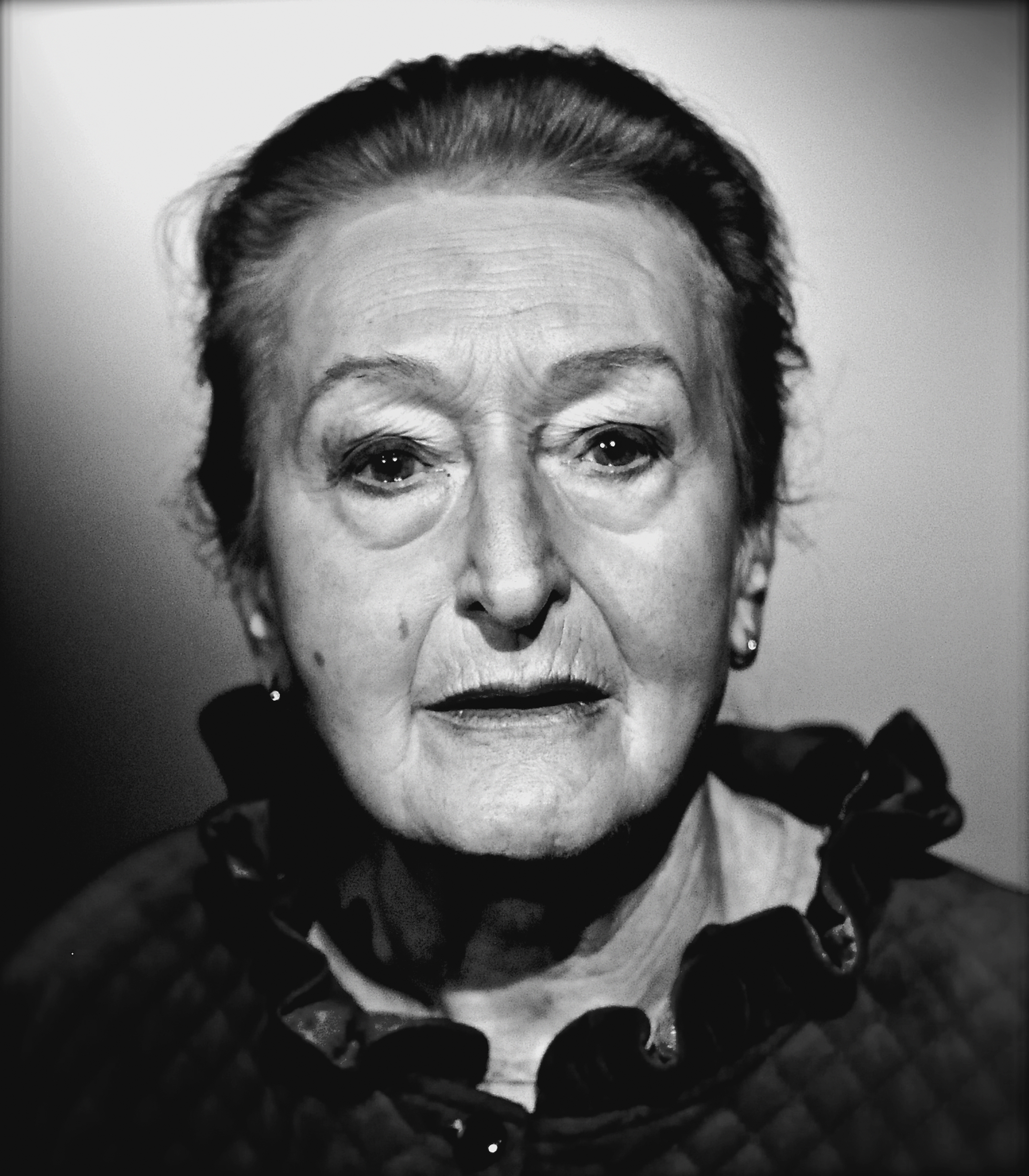
Bridget Walters as Professor Molly Taffy

Molly's Shoes is an original stage production written by Alex Vickery-Howe. It was commissioned by the Independent Arts Foundation through Carclew Youth Arts and first staged by Accidental Productions at the Bakehouse Theatre in Adelaide, South Australia, from May to July 2011.

The title refers to "shoes young people often try to fill."

== Plot ==
Molly's Shoes depicts a narrative split across time. Physics students David Moss and Elspeth Straun fall in love between 1997 and 1999 but their relationship fractures into the new millennium as their belief systems begin to clash under the critical eye of their senior lecturer, Professor Molly Taffy. In the near future, an older David and Elspeth are reunited in time to watch Molly degenerate into Alzheimer's, forced to make ethical decisions as the moment dictates.

=== ACT I – CLINGING TO A GRAIN OF SAND ===
David Moss begins his first-year studies as a science enthusiast and self-confessed geek. Early in his first week he meets Elspeth Straun. There is chemistry between the two students, despite Elspeth's fiery temper and spontaneous, live-for-the-moment edge occasionally clashing with David's self-conscious, analytical worldview.

Their lecturer, acid-tongued Molly Taffy, goads David into reaching his full potential as a student, accidentally setting him on a path of religious investigation and putting him at odds with Elspeth.

The climax comes with the sudden suicide of Molly's husband and her rejection of her now indoctrinated pupil, as well as the split between the young David and Elspeth.

In the present, an older David nurses a frail Molly, and awaits Elspeth's return to his life.

=== ACT II – ROSE COLOURED SKY ===
Elspeth, now in her early 40s, arrives at David's doorstep, to assist him in caring for Molly. The two rekindle their old flame, as Molly slips further away from reality.

David's motivation for calling Elspeth is revealed; he wants to end Molly's suffering and needs Elspeth, the non-believer, to do it. When she rejects him, David is forced to explore his personal ethics.

The past reaches into the present as the older David is confronted by the memories of the younger Elspeth and younger Molly, bringing him to his final decision.

The play explores the concepts we cling to—academia, religion, love – in order to define the world and our own place in it, ultimately presenting a world without clear answers save those we make for ourselves.

== Style ==
Molly's Shoes is a piece of contemporary theatre that employs surrealism, theatrical illusion and direct address. Characters frequently break the fourth wall to convey their feelings to the audience, and the action alternates between time periods, creating parallel narratives. The scenes are short and the dialogue is fast-paced.

== Original production ==
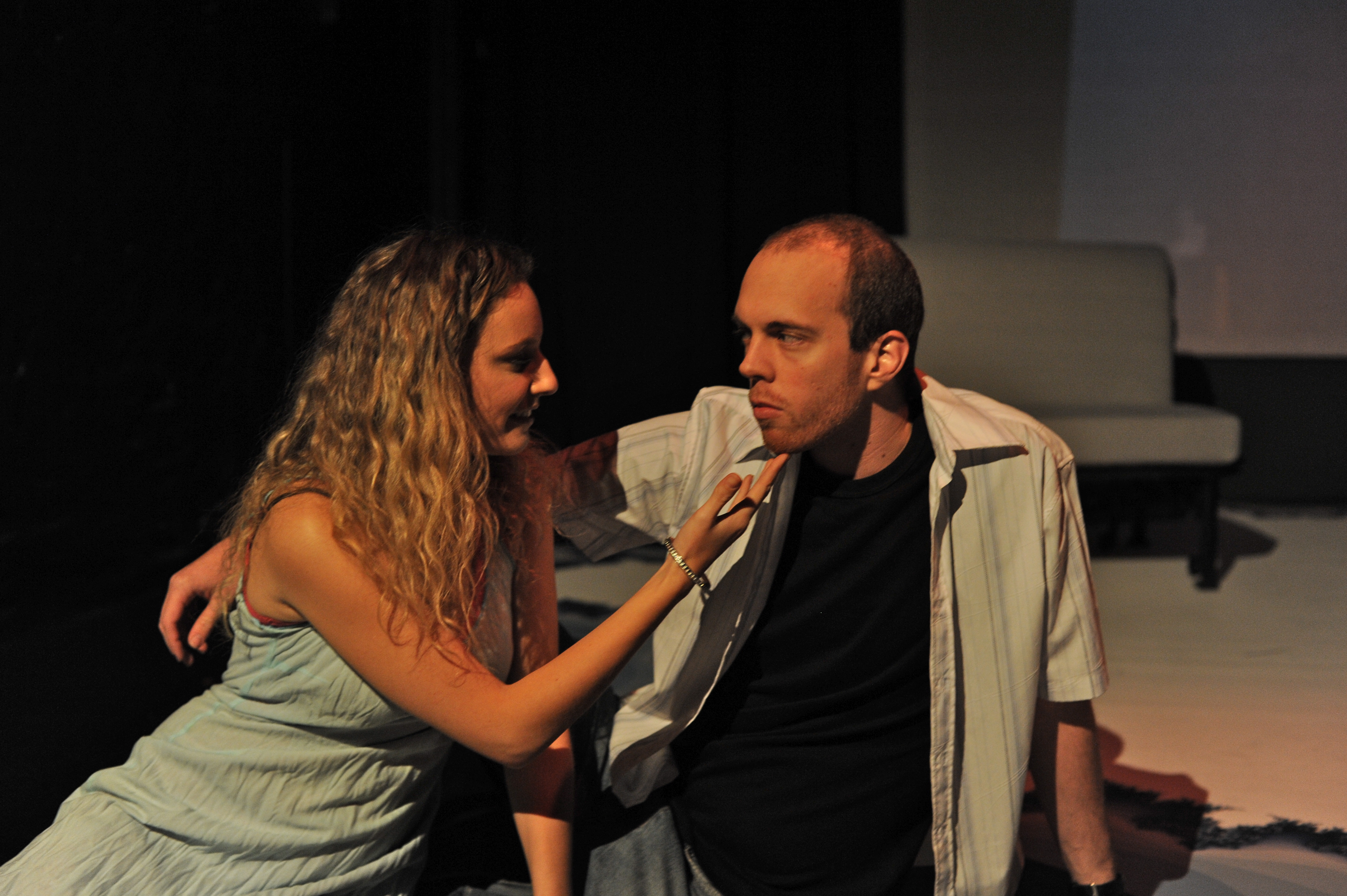
Young Elspeth (Rachel Jones) and Young David (Tim Smith)

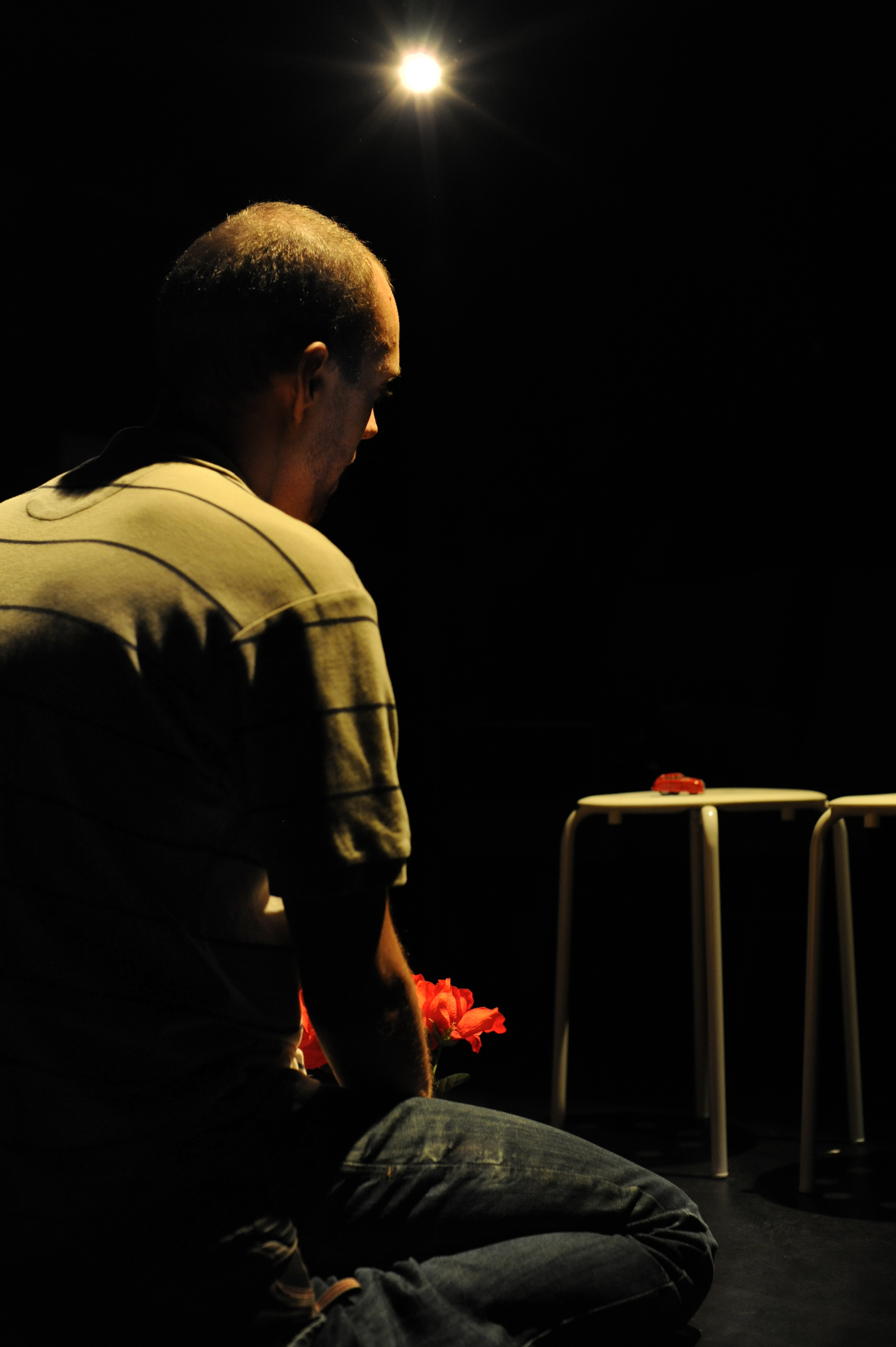
Young David (Tim Smith) kneels at his father's grave

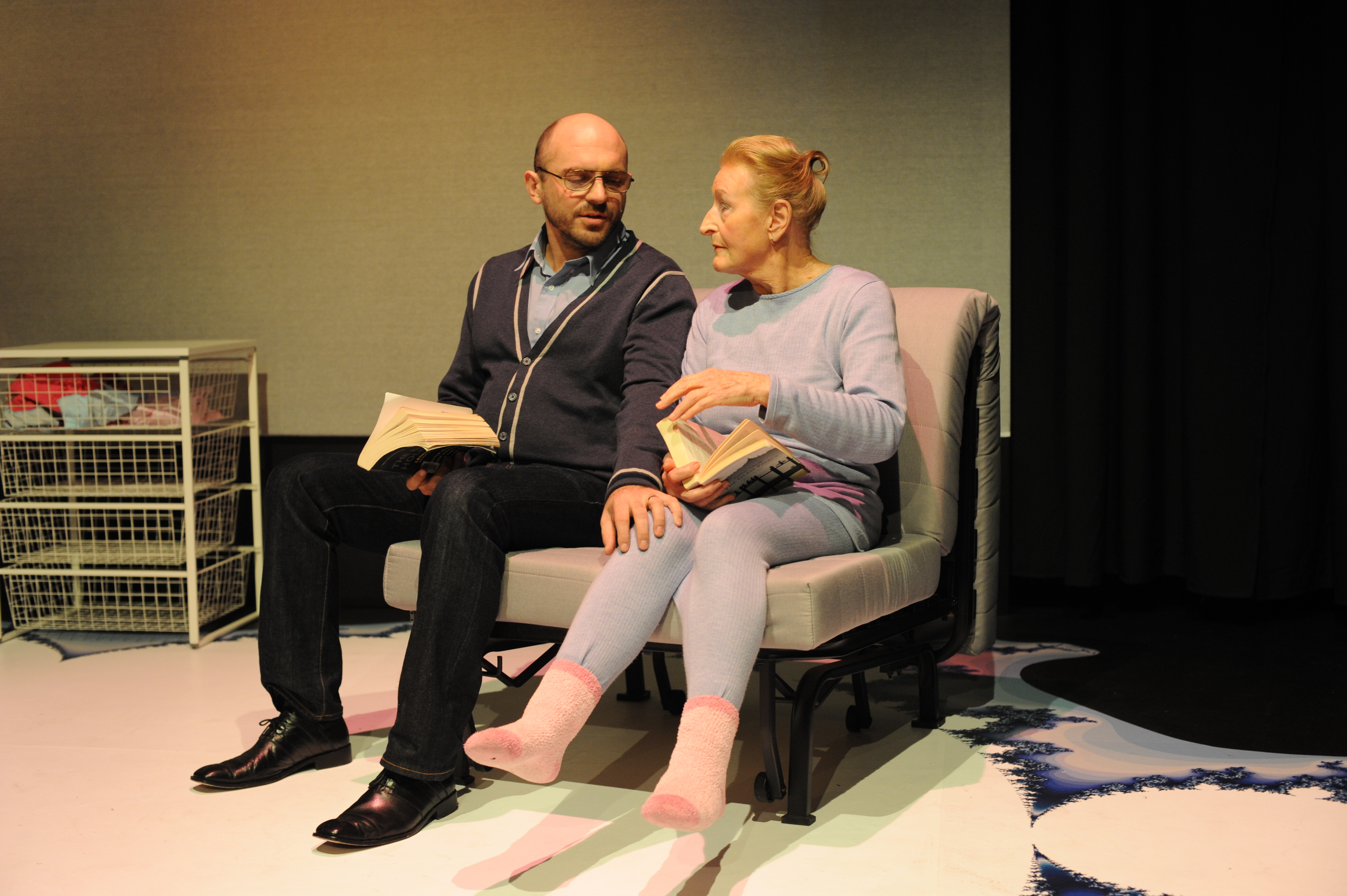
David (John Maurice) cares for Molly (Bridget Walters)

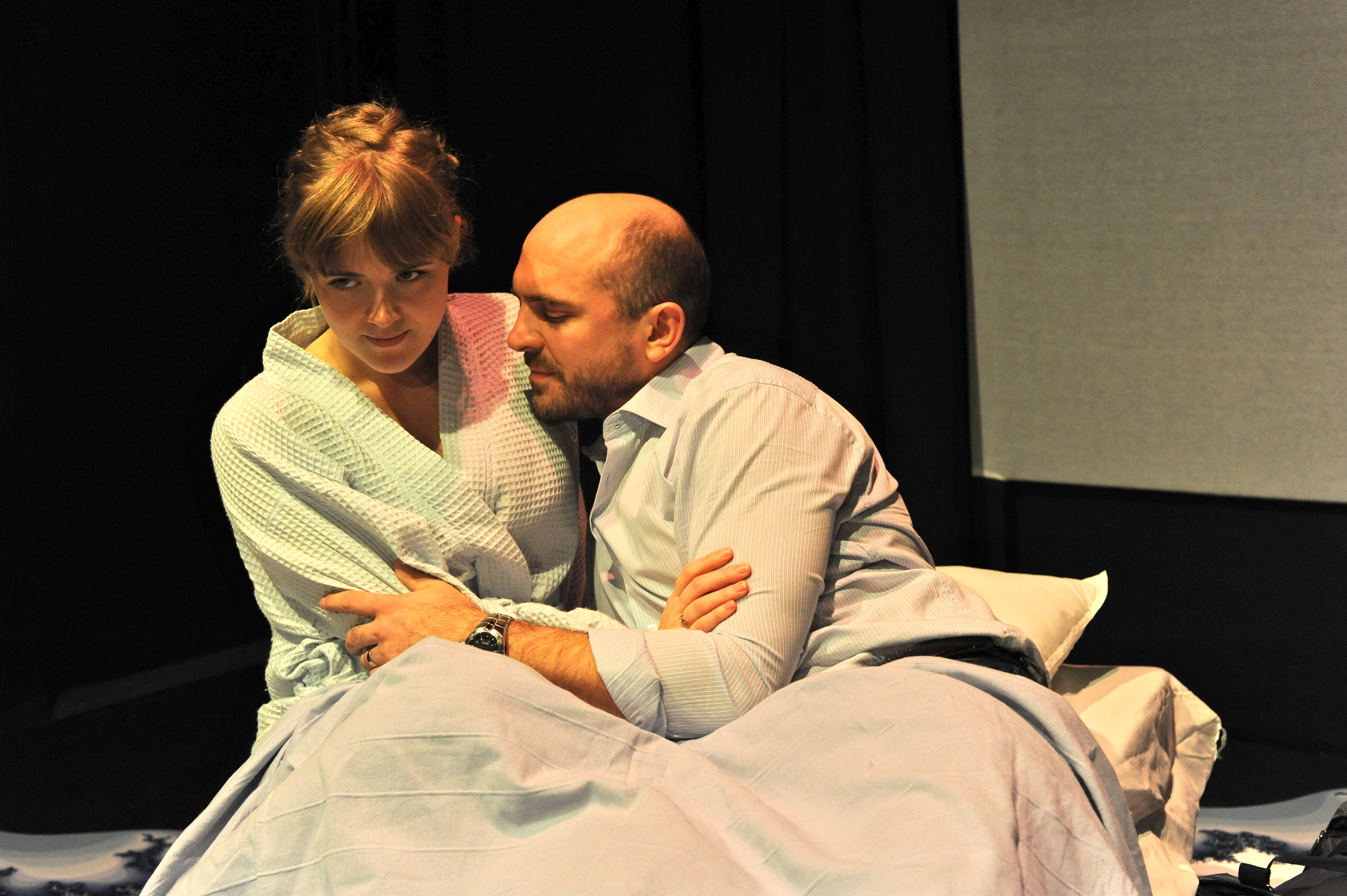
Adult Elspeth (Joanne Hartstone) and David (John Maurice)

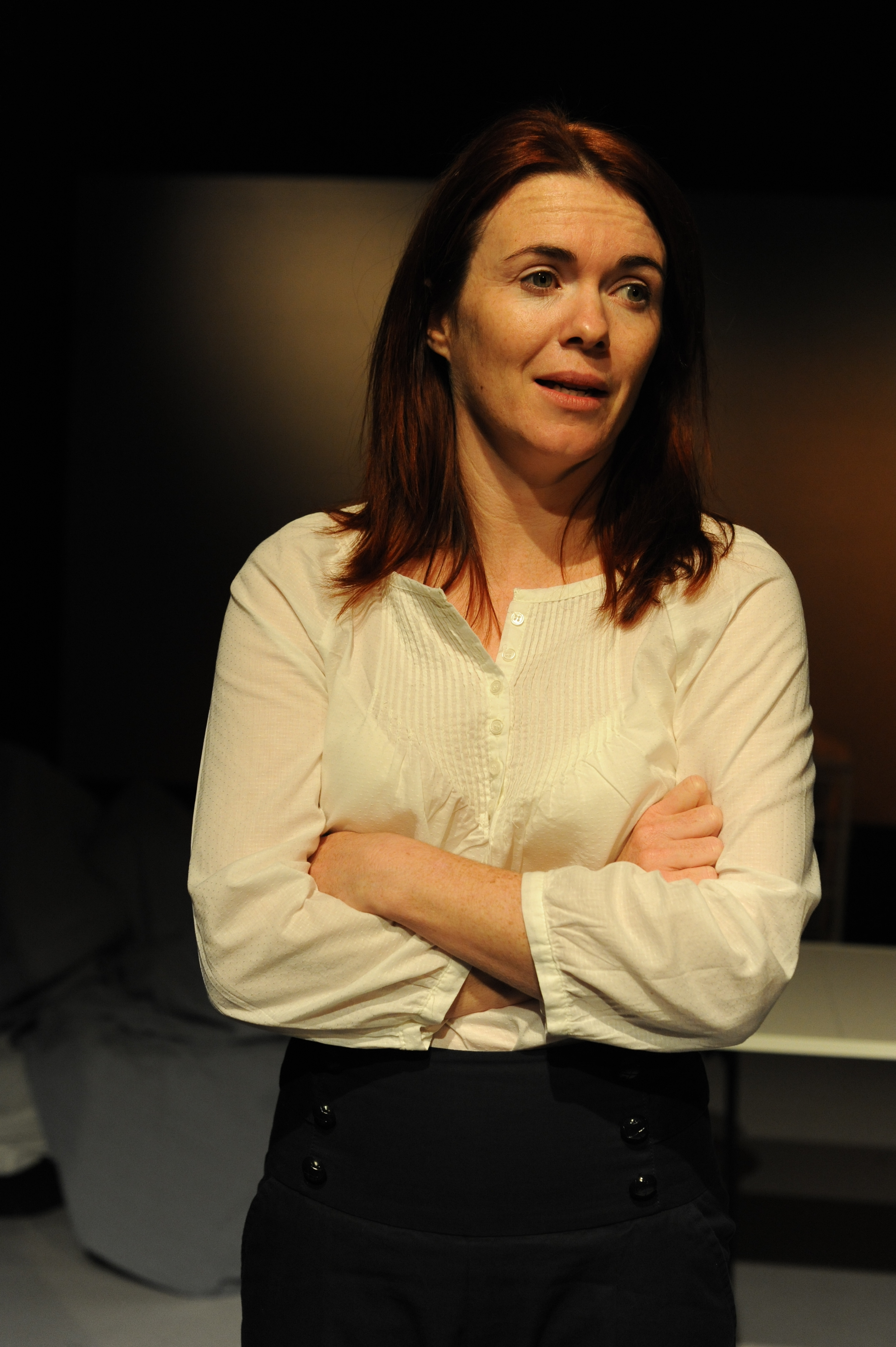
Young Molly (Katie O'Reilly)

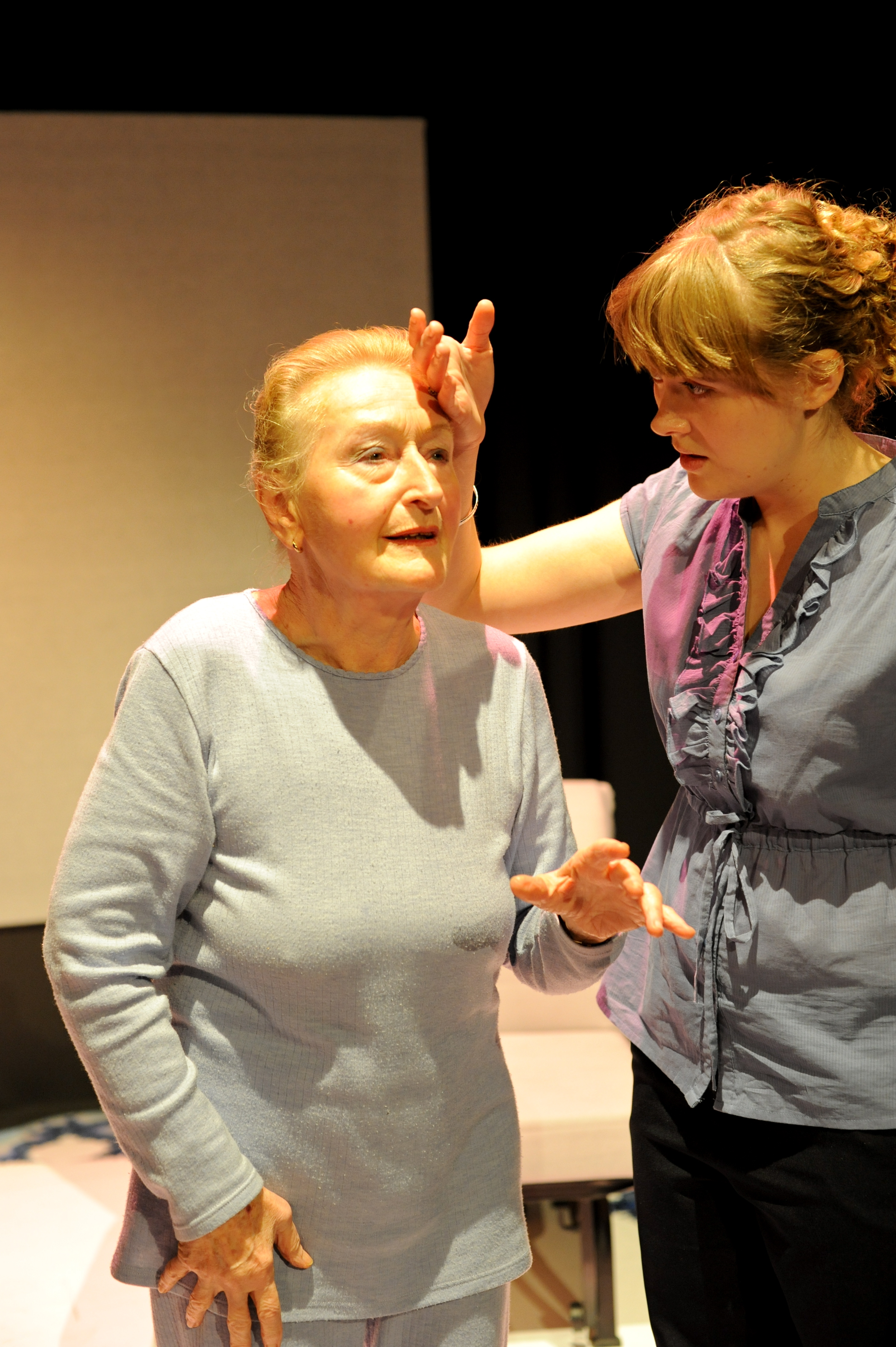
Adult Elspeth (Joanne Hartstone) and Molly (Bridget Walters)

=== Cast and crew ===
The cast of the original production in South Australia included:

- David Moss: Tim Smith / John Maurice
- Elspeth Straun: Rachel Jones / Joanne Hartstone
- Molly Taffy: Katie O'Reilly / Bridget Walters

The crew included:

- Director: Joh Hartog
- Designer: Tammy Boden
- Lighting: Stephen Dean

=== Reception ===
The debut production earned many positive reviews. Critic Barry Lenny from Glam Adelaide described Molly's Shoes as an "intellectually and emotionally engaging new play" that has "everything going for it", reserving special praise for Bridget Walters as the elder Molly:

Even if everything else had been a disaster, instead of the huge success that it actually is, it would still have been worth the price of a ticket to see her performance as the older Molly. As Walters slips from the completely lucid woman, as sharp as ever Molly was, into the vague and forgetful Molly whose brain is atrophying, it is reflected in every fibre of her. Her demeanour changes dramatically and we can literally see the light go out in her eyes. Her great talent and wealth of experience is indisputable in this performance, as it has been in so many others before.

The Australian declared Molly's Shoes "an impressive next step" for the company, while Aaron Nash of DB Magazine praised the cast, and pointed out that the debate between science and faith was well-balanced in the production:

Molly's Shoes avoids the clunky, heavy-handed preaching which tends to plague productions with this sort of subject matter and, instead, is an honest, insightful and (perhaps, most importantly) unbiased reflection on the relationship between these seemingly disparate worlds.

Although the mainstream state and national press was complimentary, theatrical blogger Stephen Davenport found the show "confounding" and "an inspired, though garbled hotchpotch of themes" a view contradicted by fellow blogger Kryztoff Raw:

To be sure, this is a very modern style play; thoughtful, well researched in its writing, coherent if always demanding of one’s attention and compelling. Given its scope, Molly’s Shoes needs to be recognised for that brilliance alone.

Jamie Wright from the online publication Adelaide Theatre Guide expressed the opposite opinion to Davenport, rather than finding it "confounding", Wright felt that the show's treatment of its core themes was simplistic:

Weaving together emotional and intellectual threads like these is a tough ask and while this production succeeds with the former, the latter aspect is less satisfying, as there isn't enough time to give the complex issues the treatment they deserve. As a result, we end up with less than the amount needed for a real examination but more than that required to provide depth to the characters. This flaw, though, only detracts somewhat from an otherwise clever, funny and genuinely touching production.

The debut production created a great deal of debate among members of the audience. On the company's website, playwright Vickery-Howe described the extreme reactions:

I’ve been labelled a Christian, an atheist, pro/anti-euthanasia, pro/anti-abortion and pro/anti-feminism, as well as brilliant, clichéd, absorbing, confounding, inspired and disappointing, all in one week. Who am I?

The play was nominated for the Adelaide Critics' Circle Awards 2011.
