= Mandy Walker =

Australian cinematographer (born 1963)

Mandy Walker AM
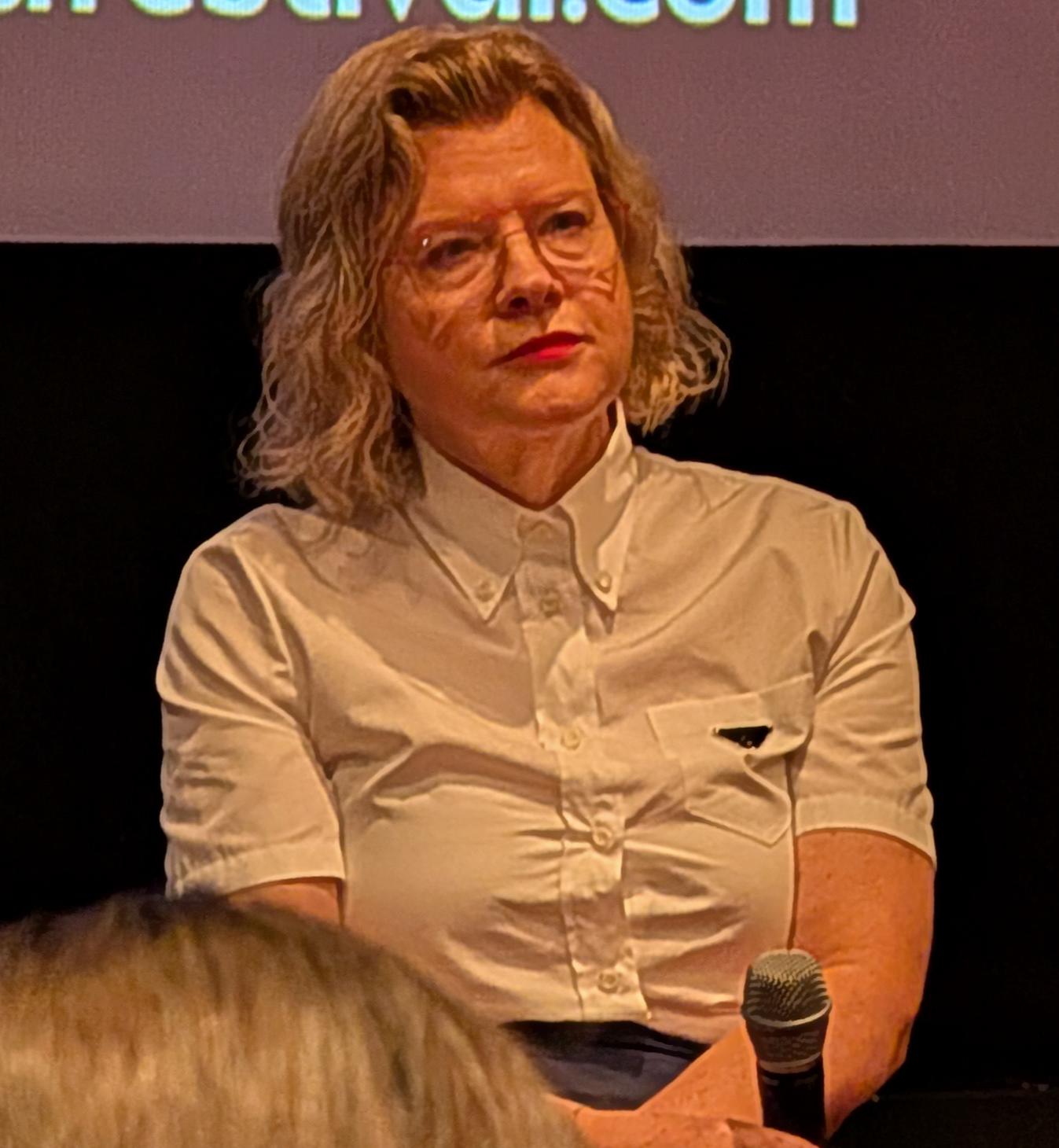
- Walker at the 2026 AACTA Festival
- Born: 1963 (age 62–63); Melbourne, Victoria, Australia
- Occupation: Cinematographer

Mandy Walker AM, ACS, ASC (born 1963) is an Australian cinematographer. She is best known for the films Hidden Figures, Mulan, and Elvis, the latter of which earned her an Academy Award nomination for Best Cinematography. She was appointed a Member of the Order of Australia in the 2021 Queen's Birthday Honours.

== Life and career ==
Born and raised in Melbourne, Victoria, Walker became interested in photography while a student in high school. After graduation she studied film criticism and cinema studies with John Flaus, who introduced her to several people working in the industry. She apprenticed as an unpaid assistant on several documentaries and music videos before shooting her first feature film, Return Home, at the age of twenty-five. Additional screen credits include Parklands, The Well, Lantana, Australian Rules, Shattered Glass, and Australia. Her television credits include the Australian Broadcasting Corporation series Raw FM.

Walker has filmed commercials for Nike, Toyota, Caltex, Cingular Wireless, Foxwoods Casino and, most notably, the spot for Chanel No. 5 directed by Baz Luhrmann and featuring Nicole Kidman.

The Australian Cinematographers Society honoured Walker with their Award of Distinction for Parklands and Lantana. She was nominated for the Australian Film Institute Award for Best Achievement in Cinematography for The Well, the Film Critics Circle of Australia Award for Best Cinematography for The Well and Lantana, and the Independent Spirit Award for Best Cinematography for Shattered Glass.

Walker was appointed a Member of the Order of Australia for "significant service to film as a cinematographer, and to professional societies" in the 2021 Queen's Birthday Honours.

On 4 December 2022, she became the first woman to win a cinematography award at the AACTA Awards, for her work on Elvis. On 5 March 2023, she became the first woman to win the American Society of Cinematographers Award in the feature film category, also for Elvis.

In 2025 she was elected the 48th president of the American Society of Cinematographers. She is the first woman to lead the society.

Walker presently lives in Santa Monica, California.

== Filmography ==
=== Film ===
Year	Title	Director	Notes
1990	Return Home	Ray Argall	
1992	Eight Ball	Ray Argall	
1996	Parklands	Kathryn Millard	
1996	Love Serenade	Shirley Barrett	
1996	Life	Lawrence Johnston	
1997	The Well	Samantha Lang	
2000	Walk the Talk	Shirley Barrett	
2001	Lantana	Ray Lawrence	
2002	Australian Rules	Paul Goldman	
2003	Shattered Glass	Billy Ray	
2008	Australia	Baz Luhrmann	
2011	Beastly	Daniel Barnz	
2011	Red Riding Hood	Catherine Hardwicke	
2013	Tracks	John Curran	
2015	Truth	James Vanderbilt	
2015	Jane Got a Gun	Gavin O'Connor	
2016	Hidden Figures	Theodore Melfi	
2017	The Mountain Between Us	Hany Abu-Assad	
2020	Mulan	Niki Caro	
2022	Elvis	Baz Luhrmann	
2025	Snow White	Marc Webb	

=== Television ===
Year	Title	Director	Notes
1992	Everyman	Cherie Nowlan	Episode "God's Girls: Stories from an Australian Convent"
1996	Naked: Stories of Men	Geoffrey Wright	Episode "A Fallen Woman"
1997	Raw FM		
2023	Faraway Downs	Baz Luhrmann	Miniseries

TV movies

Year	Title	Director
2013	Gilded Lilys	Brian Kirk
2014	Only Human	Gavin O'Connor

== Awards and nominations ==
Year	Award	Category	Title	Result
1997	Australian Academy of Cinema and Television Arts	Best Cinematography	The Well	Nominated
2008	Satellite Awards	Best Cinematography	Australia	Won
2013	Australian Academy of Cinema and Television Arts	Best Cinematography	Tracks	Nominated
2022	Australian Academy of Cinema and Television Arts	Best Cinematography	Elvis	Won
2022	American Society of Cinematographers Awards	Outstanding Achievement in Cinematography	Elvis	Won
2022	Academy Awards	Best Cinematography	Elvis	Nominated
2022	BAFTA Awards	Best Cinematography	Elvis	Nominated
