= A Stab in the Dark (play) =

Play by Alex Vickery-Howe

Poster for the 2008 Adelaide production directed by Toni Main.

A Stab in the Dark is a whodunnit written by Australian playwright Alex Vickery-Howe. The first production was performed in Adelaide, South Australia, in February - March 2008 and directed by Toni Main.

== Synopsis ==
A Stab in the Dark begins with the arrival of Myles Fletcher and Randal Devlin Scout to the remote island home of their adopted father, Helmut Kinderland. Sniveling, stuttering Fletcher is a stark contrast to the confident and charismatic Scout. The two swap stories about the times shared together in Mr. Kinderland's custody before they are joined by Eleanor Grubb, the caretaker. Fletcher agonizes over the dire weather warnings as Scout gets the alcohol flowing and Mrs. Grubb wonders who these two strange people are, despite having been their nanny for many years. The reunion party moves up a notch when Isabella Virtue, Fletcher's old flame, swans in. Fletcher and Virtue have shared a steamy past causing Fletcher to become even more nervous. Soon, Walter Crowley and his butch wife Sheila Hunt thunder through the door mid-argument.

The Crowleys are followed by Walter's twin sister, Lacey. She attempts to steer the reunion back on course while Jade Sloan, a twisted and sadistic fashion designer, enters to expose the bitter secrets of the feuding guests. Finally, the last member of the group, dashing pilot Maverick Horne, enters via the back window and tries to seduce everyone else in the room. The cast of wicked characters is assembled and, just when everyone begins to put their differences aside, Mr. Kinderland's bloody corpse slips out from behind the curtains...

== Development ==
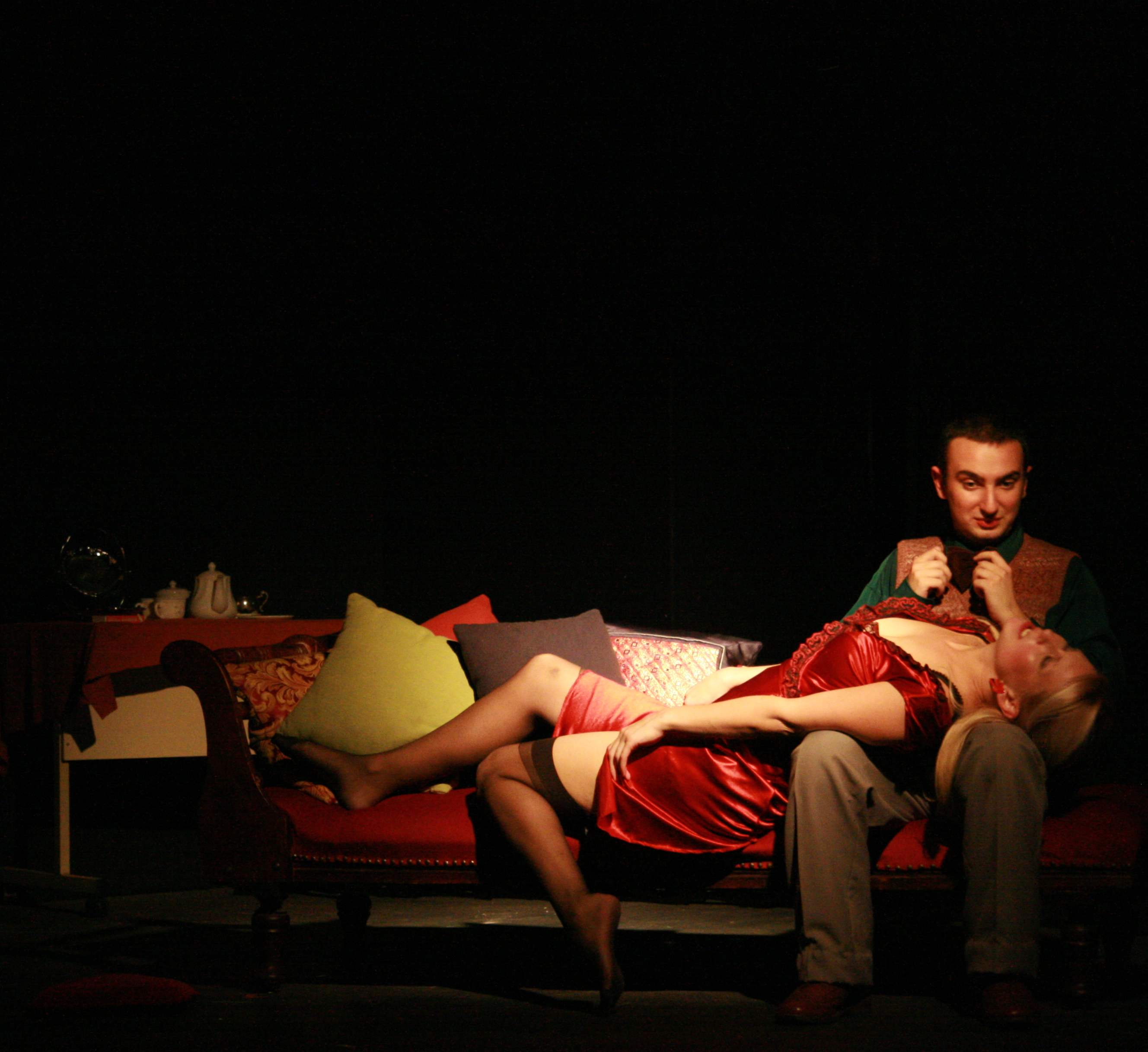
A scene from the 2008 production, featuring Isabella Virtue (Tanya Kaploon) and Myles Fletcher (Andrew Crupi)

The play was developed at Higher Ground, a South Australian arts venue, as part of the 2008 Adelaide Fringe. The writer received the Independent Arts Foundation Literature Award based on a body of work, including A Stab in the Dark and Once Upon a Midnight.

== Genre ==
The show is a murder mystery homage, closely modeled on Agatha Christie's 1939 novel And Then There Were None but in the fast-paced comic style of Clue and Murder By Death. There are elements of slapstick and wordplay but also scenes that feature graphic horror and surrealism.

Throughout, the killer mimics Poe's The Masque of the Red Death, alluding to the strand that binds the adopted children together... in this case, the 'pestilence' Red Death refers to is porphyria. Each of the characters possesses a rare blood type and they eventually discover that they were all adopted to keep their "father", Helmut Kinderland, healthy through regular transfusions. It is suggested that Mr. Kinderland murdered their birth parents to harvest them as babies, triggering the chain of events.

A further allusion is made to the seven deadly sins; sloth (Helmut Kinderland), gluttony (Walter Crowley), pride (Jade Sloan), envy (Sheila Hunt), lust (Maverick Horne), greed (Randal Devlin Scout) and the killer's wrath. In contrast, aptly named Isabella Virtue is loyal to Myles Fletcher, who embodies humility, while Lacey Crowley is defined by her kindness. The latter three survive until the play's climax.

In the climactic scene, the play breaks completely from naturalism by having the character of Mr. Kinderland return from the dead, as a ghost or vision, but this is framed as a symptom of the killer's madness. Additionally, the song Hush, Little Baby is repeated many times in the story, often when the characters are reflecting on their childhood, to create an eerie effect. At first, there is an onstage source for the song, but over time, it creeps in without explanation and plays for the last time when the killer is confronted.

== Critical reception ==
Rip It Up Magazine said of the original production "A Stab In The Dark brings together a cast of characters representing all aspects of human vice, and everyone quickly exhibits all sorts of ulterior motives as the plot takes all sorts of twists and turns. Played brilliantly by all the players and with some great artistic direction, this one will keep you guessing right till the thrilling conclusion. Remember, nothing is as it seems! Very good indeed!"

== Original cast ==
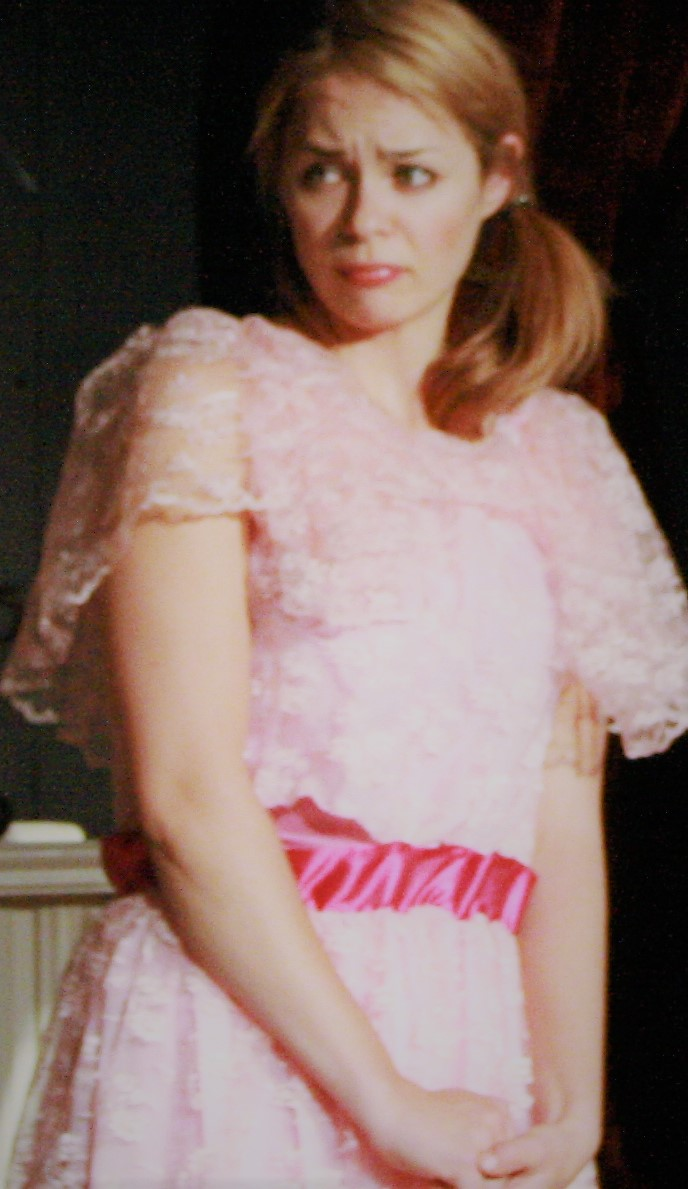
Maya Aleksandra as Lacey Crowley

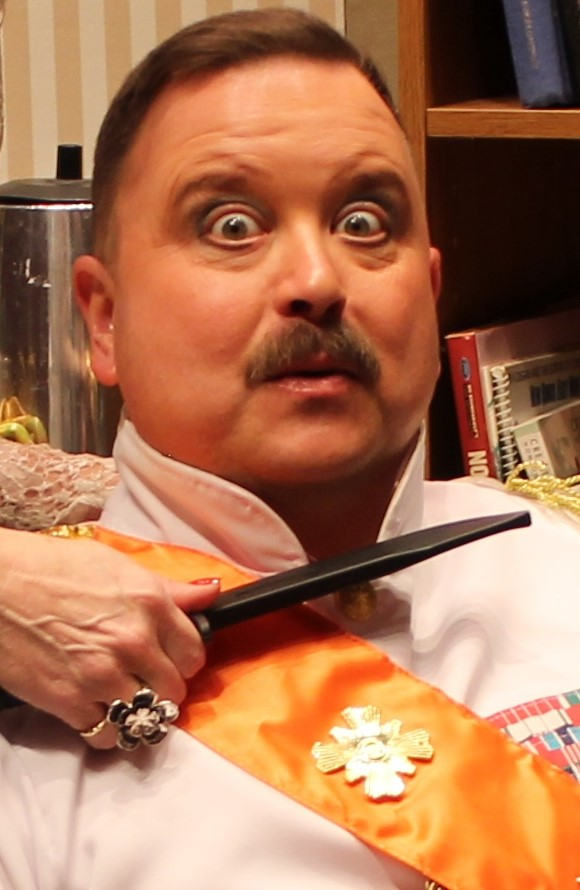
Will Eichelberger as Maverick Horne

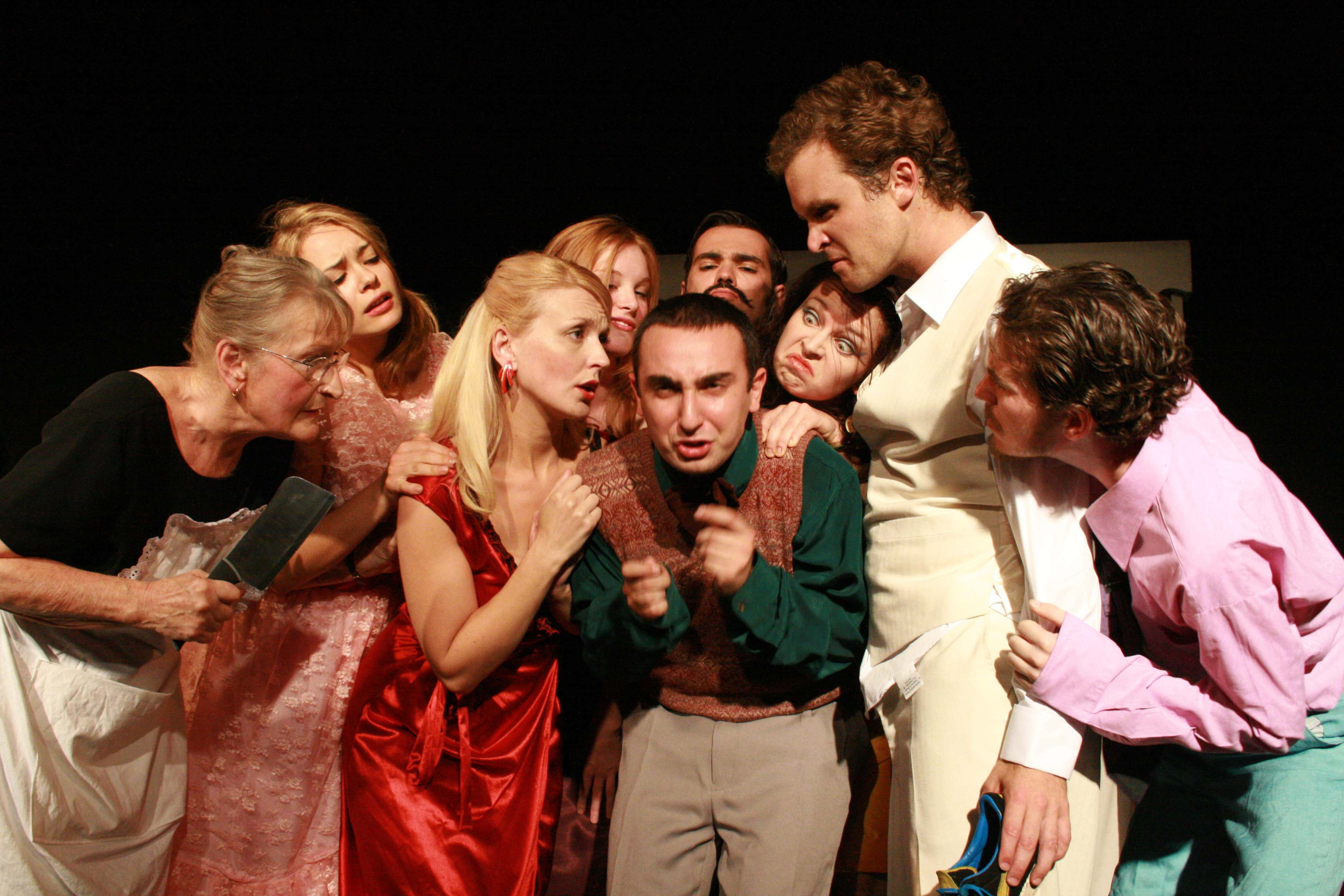
The cast of the original Adelaide production. From left: Eleanor Grubb (Bridget Walters), Lacey Crowley (Maya Aleksandra), Isabella Virtue (Tanya Kaploon), Jade Sloan (Katherine Warner), Myles Fletcher (Andrew Crupi), Maverick Horne (Alec S. Hall), Sheila Hunt (Stephanie Pinnock), Randal Devlin Scout (Adam Wilson) and Walter Crowley (Martin Hissey)

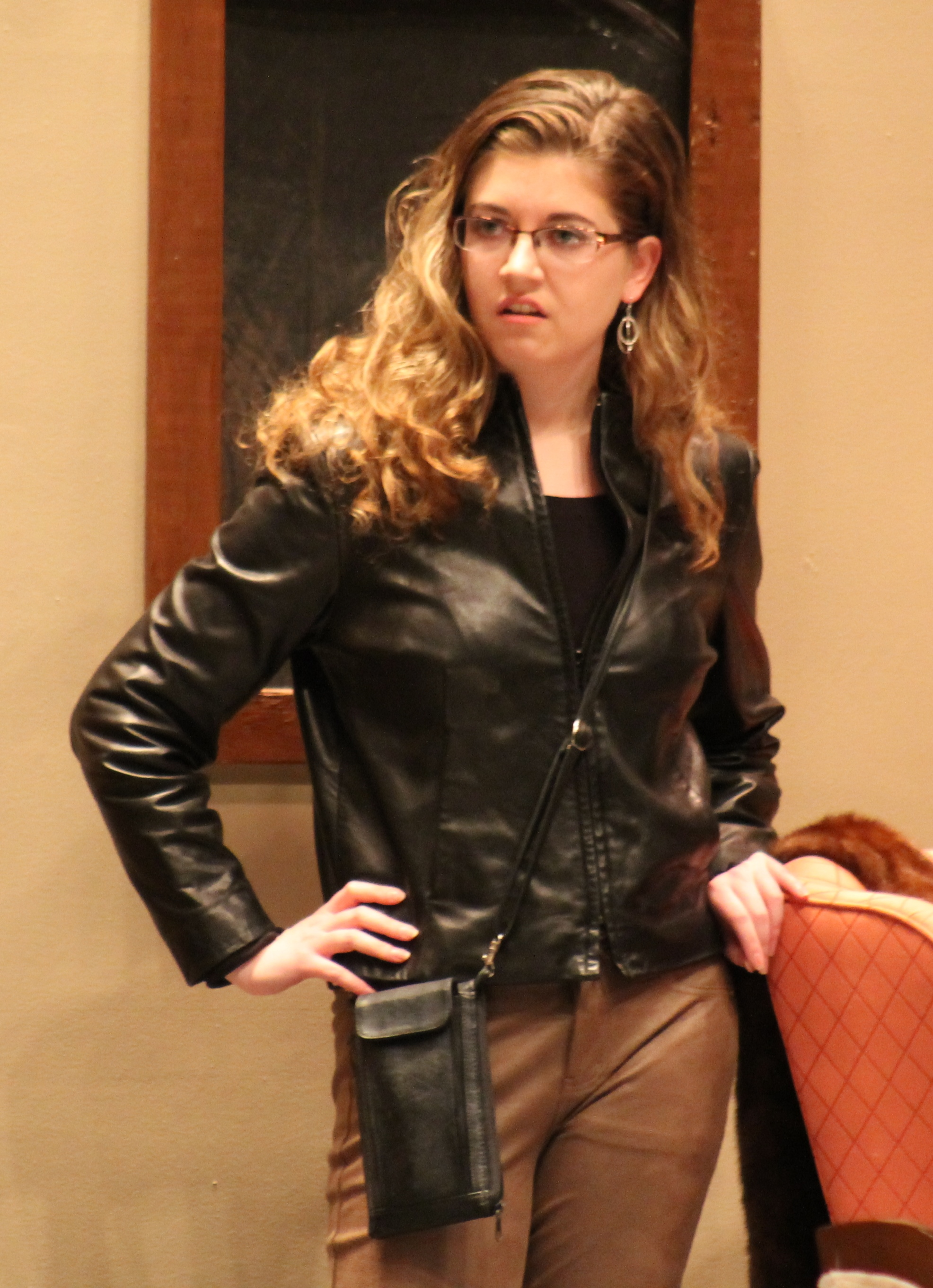
Sarah Eddy as Jade Sloan

Helmut Kinderland James Aubrey

Randal Devlin Scout Adam Willson

Myles Fletcher Andrew Crupi

Eleanor Grubb Bridget Walters

Isabella Virtue Tanya Kaploon

Jade Sloan Katherine Warner

Walter Crowley Martin Hissey

Lacey Crowley Maya Aleksandra

Sheila Hunt Stephanie Pinnock

Maverick Horne Alec Hall

== Michigan performance ==
The play was performed in Delton, Michigan in February 2016 and directed by Renae Feldpausch.

== American cast ==
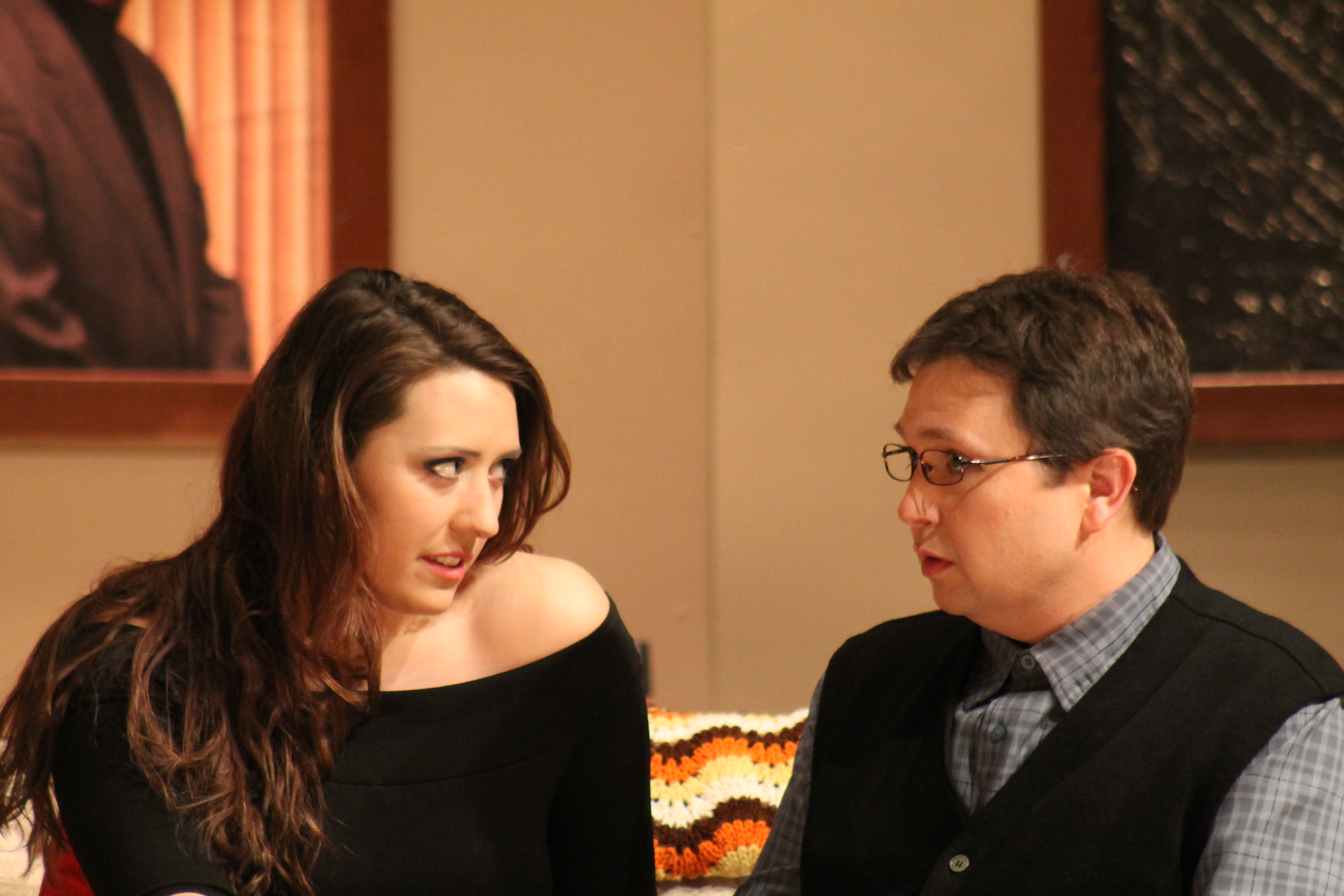
Isabella Virtue (Jordan Dimock) and Myles Fletcher (Charlie Saulino)

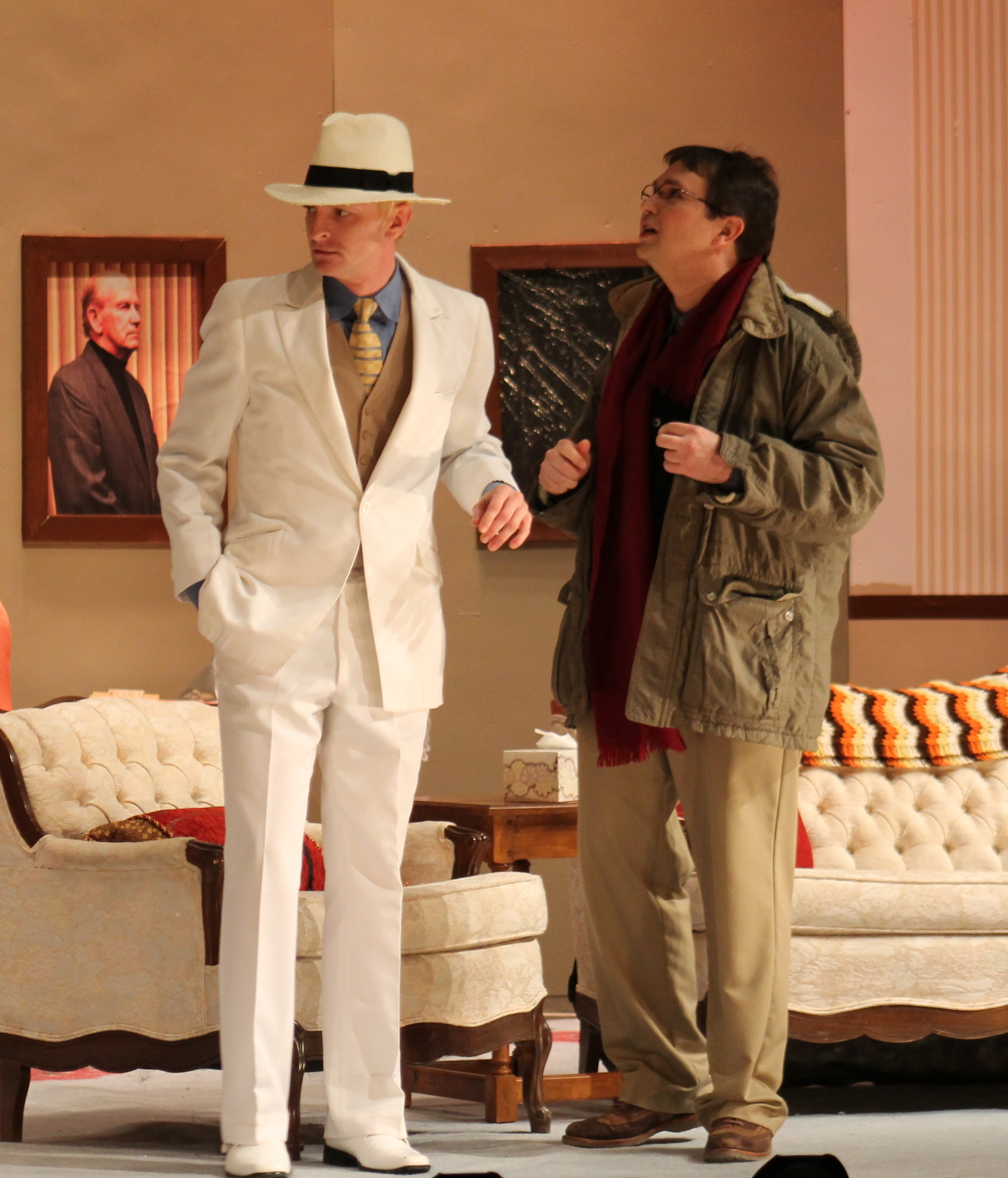
Scout and Fletcher

Helmut Kinderland Gene Trantham

Randal Devlin Scout Sam West

Myles Fletcher Charlie Saulino

Eleanor Grubb Sharon Weisman

Isabella Virtue Jordan Dimock

Jade Sloan Sarah Eddy

Walter Crowley Franklin White

Lacey Crowley Karla Fales

Sheila Hunt Adorée Miron

Maverick Horne Will Eichelberger

Additionally, Rodger Hough played a policeman in the final scene.
