= Kijimuna =

Okinawan folkloric figures

The kijimuna (Okinawan: キジムナー, romanized: kijimunaa, lit. 'wood spirit') are mythological creatures said to inhabit the island of Okinawa. They are described as resembling around a three or four-year-old child with wild red hair.

== About ==
The kijimuna are small wood spirits according to Okinawan mythology. The kijimuna are said to live in trees, but the most common one is the 'gajumaru' or banyan tree. Their name, derived from the Okinawan language, translates to "child of the tree" or "tree ghost". They are often described as being child-sized, with red hair covering their bodies and large heads. They are also known to be excellent fisherman, able to catch many fish, but then only eating one of the eyes of the fish before leaving the rest of it. The Kijimuna festival in Okinawa is named after them. Another name for the kijimuna is "bunagaya," which means roughly "Large-Headed." The Kijimuna are known to be very mischievous, playing pranks and tricking humans. One of their best-known tricks is to lie upon a person's chest, making them unable to move or breathe. This is known as "kanashibari." Even though the Kijimuna are tricksters, they have been known to make friends with humans. However, these relationships often go sour. A kijimuna may offer to carry a human on its back as it leaps through the mountains and over the seas. The kijimuna dislike people passing gas on their backs, however, and will immediately throw the human off, no matter where they were at the moment. The kijimuna also hate octopuses.

== Stories ==
The kijimuna are a common subject in Okinawan folk tales. Many of their stories begin with the kijimuna becoming a human's friend and then ending with the relationship going bad. One story tells of a kijimuna's friend burning down his tree, so the kijimuna fled to the mountains.

== See also ==
- ja:マジムン (majimun, or Okinawan equivalent of yōkai)
