= Kijimuna Festival =

The International Theater Festival Okinawa for Young Audiences is a yearly children's theatrical festival held in Okinawa, Japan. It is sponsored by the city of Okinawa and features content from around the world. It was originally named the Kijimuna Festival after the Kijimuna, a mythical creature who inhabits the trees and swamps of Okinawa. In 2014, it moved its main venue to the city of Naha. Subsequently, in 2015, it was renamed the Ricca Ricca Festa after the phrase "let's go" in the Okinawan language.

== Sources ==
- http://www.kijimunafesta.com/
- http://www.kijimuna.org/
- http://www.japanupdate.com/?id=9671
- http://www.lookatvietnam.com/tag/kijimuna
- http://www.japanupdate.com/?id=8816
- http://annassitej.wordpress.com/2009/04/14/kijimuna-festa-2009/
- https://www.facebook.com/nuchigusuifest/
