= Bridget Walters =

Australian actress

- Occupation: Actress

Bridget Walters is an Australian actress and veteran member of the State Theatre Company of South Australia where she has performed in productions of Macbeth, Noises Off, Uncle Vanya and The Cripple of Inishmaan. Her brother is Sam Walters.

== Filmography ==
Hey Hey It's Esther Blueburger (2008) .... Mrs Rosen

The 13th House (2003) .... Myopic Tropical Woman at Reception Desk

Devil in the Detail (1997) .... Mrs. Crookshank

Parklands (1996) .... Mrs. Roberts

Bad Boy Bubby (1993) .... Angel's mother
