= 1999 in literature =

This article contains information about the literary events and publications of 1999.

== Events ==
- May 1 – Andrew Motion is appointed Poet Laureate of the United Kingdom for ten years.
- June 19 – Stephen King is hit by a van while taking a walk. He is hospitalized for three weeks and only resumes writing his next book, On Writing, in July.
- September 7 – Black Diamond, designed by Schmidt Hammer Lassen Architects, is inaugurated as an extension to the Royal Danish Library in Copenhagen.
- unknown date – Persephone Books is founded in Bloomsbury, London, by Nicola Beauman, to reprint mid-20th century fiction and non-fiction, mainly by women.

== New books ==
=== Fiction ===
- Isabel Allende – Daughter of Fortune (Hija de la fortuna)
- Aaron Allston
  - Solo Command
  - Starfighters of Adumar
- Laurie Halse Anderson – Speak
- Max Barry – Syrup
- Greg Bear – Darwin's Radio
- Raymond Benson
  - High Time to Kill
  - The World Is Not Enough
- Maeve Binchy – Tara Road
- Luther Blissett (pseudonym) – Q
- François Bloemhof – Klipgooi
- Ben Bova – Return to Mars
- Terry Brooks – Star Wars: Episode I – The Phantom Menace
- Thomas Brussig – Am kürzeren Ende der Sonnenallee
- Bonnie Burnard – A Good House
- Stephen Chbosky – The Perks of Being a Wallflower
- Tracy Chevalier – Girl with a Pearl Earring
- J. M. Coetzee – Disgrace
- Matt Cohen – Elizabeth and After
- Bernard Cornwell
  - Sharpe's Fortress
  - Stonehenge: A Novel of 2000 BC
- Douglas Coupland – Miss Wyoming
- Robert Crais – L.A. Requiem
- Michael Crichton – Timeline
- August Derleth (editor) – New Horizons
- Marc Dugain – La Chambre des Officiers (The Officers' Ward)
- Frederic S. Durbin – Dragonfly
- Bret Easton Ellis – Glamorama
- Per Olov Enquist – The Visit of the Royal Physician (Livläkarens besök)
- Steve Erickson – The Sea Came in at Midnight
- Sebastian Faulks – Charlotte Gray
- Helen Fielding – The Edge of Reason
- Amanda Filipacchi – Vapor
- Anna Gavalda – Je voudrais que quelqu'un m'attende quelque part
- John Grisham – The Testament
- Ha Jin (哈金) – Waiting
- Joanne Harris – Chocolat
- Thomas Harris – Hannibal
- Ernest Hemingway – True at First Light
- Carl Hiaasen – Sick Puppy
- Stewart Home – Cunt
- Michel Houellebecq – Atomised
- Jerry B. Jenkins and Tim LaHaye – Soul Harvest
- K. W. Jeter – Hard Merchandise
- Lisa Jewell – Ralph's Party
- Stephen King:
  - The Girl Who Loved Tom Gordon
  - Hearts in Atlantis
- László Krasznahorkai – War and War
- Jhumpa Lahiri – Interpreter of Maladies (short stories)
- Joe R. Lansdale
  - Veil's Visit: a Taste of Hap and Leonard
  - Freezer Burn
- John le Carré – Single & Single
- Jonathan Lethem – Motherless Brooklyn
- Ray Loriga – Tokio ya no nos quiere
- Frank McCourt -'Tis
- David Macfarlane – Summer Gone
- Alistair MacLeod – No Great Mischief
- Juliet Marillier – Daughter of the Forest
- Alan Moore and Eddie Campbell – From Hell (graphic novel)
- Jeffrey Moore – Prisoner in a Red-Rose Chain
- Erwin Mortier – Marcel
- Chuck Palahniuk
  - Invisible Monsters
  - Survivor
- Tony Parsons – Man and Boy
- Terry Pratchett – The Fifth Elephant
- Kathy Reichs – Death du Jour
- Matthew Reilly – Temple
- Jennifer Roberson – Lady of Sherwood
- Louis Sachar – Holes
- R. A. Salvatore – Vector Prime
- Margit Sandemo – Skattejakten
- Neal Shusterman – Downsiders
- Susan Sontag – In America
- Ahdaf Soueif – The Map of Love
- Michael Stackpole – Isard's Revenge
- Matthew Stadler – Allan Stein
- Danielle Steel – Irresistible Forces
- Neal Stephenson – Cryptonomicon
- Francine Stock – A Foreign Country
- Peter Straub – Mr. X
- Remy Sylado – Ca Bau Kan (The Courtesan)
- Koushun Takami (高見 広春) – Battle Royale
- Rose Tremain – Music and Silence
- Miloš Urban – Sedmikostelí (The Seven Churches)
- Andrew Vachss – Choice of Evil
- Jane Vandenburgh – The Physics of Sunset
- Vernor Vinge – A Deepness in the Sky
- Jeanette Winterson – The World and Other Places
- Timothy Zahn – The Icarus Hunt
- Roger Zelazny and Jane Lindskold – Lord Demon

=== Children and young people ===
- David Almond – Kit's Wilderness
- Elizabeth Arnold – Spin of the Sunwheel
- Susan Cooper – King of Shadows
- Julia Donaldson (with Axel Scheffler) – The Gruffalo
- Nick Earls – 48 Shades of Brown
- Mem Fox - Sleepy Bears
- Barbara Diamond Goldin – Journeys With Elijah: Eight Tales of the Prophet
- Gerald Hausman (with Loretta Hausman and Barry Moser) – Dogs of Myth: Tales from Around the World
- Satoshi Kitamura – Me and My Cat?
- Adeline Yen Mah – Chinese Cinderella (autobiography)
- Robert L. Millet (with James C. Christensen) – Parables and other Teaching Stories
- John Nickle – The Ant Bully
- Andre Norton (with Martin H. Greenberg) – Catfantastic V
- Iona Opie – Here Comes Mother Goose
- Jerry Pinkney
  - The Little Match Girl
  - The Ugly Duckling
- Louise Rennison – Angus, Thongs and Full-Frontal Snogging
- Faith Ringgold – If a Bus Could Talk: The Story of Rosa Parks
- J. K. Rowling – Harry Potter and the Prisoner of Azkaban
- Lemony Snicket
  - The Bad Beginning
  - The Reptile Room
- Jacqueline Wilson – The Illustrated Mum
- Simms Taback – Joseph Had a Little Overcoat

=== Drama ===
- Jon Fosse – Dream of Autumn (Draum om hausten)
- David Mamet – Boston Marriage
- Frank McGuinness – Dolly West's Kitchen
- Lars Norén – 7:3
- Mark O'Rowe – Howie the Rookie
- Éric-Emmanuel Schmitt – Hôtel des deux mondes
- Zlatko Topčić – Refugees
- August Wilson – King Hedley II

=== Poetry ===
- Iona Opie – Here Comes Mother Goose
- Dejan Stojanović – Sunce sebe gleda (The Sun Watches Itself)

=== Non-fiction ===
- Thomas Berry – The Great Work: Our Way into the Future
- David Cairns – Berlioz: Volume 2, Servitude and Greatness 1832–1869
- Wayson Choy – Paper Shadows: A Chinatown Childhood
- The Dalai Lama – Ancient Wisdom, Modern World
- Samuel R. Delany – Times Square Red, Times Square Blue
- Laurence des Cars – Les Préraphaélites : Un modernisme à l'anglaise
- Freeman Dyson – The Sun, the Genome and the Internet
- Koenraad Elst – Update on the Aryan Invasion Debate
- John Steele Gordon – The Great Game: The Emergence of Wall Street as a World Power: 1653–2000
- Brian Greene – The Elegant Universe
- Deborah Harkness – John Dee's Conversations with Angels: Cabala, Alchemy, and the End of Nature
- Peter Jennings and Todd Brewster – The Century
- S.T. Joshi – Sixty Years of Arkham House
- Winona LaDuke – All our Relations: Native Struggles for Land and Life
- Bruce Lincoln – Theorizing Myth: Narrative, Ideology, and Scholarship
- Jamie Oliver – The Naked Chef
- W. G. Sebald – Luftkrieg und Literatur (Air War and Literature, translated as On the Natural History of Destruction)
- David Southwell – Conspiracy Theories
- Dejan Stojanović – Razgovori (Conversations)
- Jean-Pierre Vernant – L'univers, les dieux, les hommes

== Births ==
- October 13 – Faridah Àbíké-Íyímídé, Nigerian–British author and columnist
- December 22 – Ameer Idreis, Canadian writer

== Deaths ==
- January 11 – Naomi Mitchison, Scottish novelist and poet (born 1897)
- January 16 – Dadie Rylands (George Rylands), English Shakespearean scholar (born 1902)
- February 8 – Iris Murdoch, Irish-born novelist and philosopher (born 1919)
- February 20 – Sarah Kane, English playwright (suicide, born 1971)
- February 22 – William Bronk, American poet (born 1918)
- February 24 – Andre Dubus, American short story writer, essayist and autobiographer (born 1936)
- March 4
  - Del Close, American actor, writer, and teacher (born 1934)
  - Karel van het Reve, Dutch writer (born 1921)
- March 5 – John Figueroa, Jamaican poet (born 1920)
- March 8 – Adolfo Bioy Casares, Argentine author (born 1914)
- March 13
  - Lee Falk, American cartoonist, writer, theater director, and producer (born 1911)
  - Garson Kanin, American playwright and screenwriter (born 1912)
- March 28 – Jim Turner, American editor (born 1945)
- April 13 – Knut Hauge, Norwegian novelist, dramatist and children's writer (born 1911)
- May 8 – Soeman Hs, Indonesian novelist (born 1904)
- May 10 – Shel Silverstein, American children's poet (born 1930)
- May 27 – Alice Adams, short story writer and novelist (born 1926)
- June 14 – J. F. Powers, American writer (born 1917)
- July 2 – Mario Puzo, American writer (born 1920)
- July 14 – Maria Banuș, Romanian poet and translator (born 1914)
- September 25 – Marion Zimmer Bradley, American writer (born 1930)
- October 3 – Heinz G. Konsalik, German novelist (born 1921)
- October 19
  - Penelope Mortimer, Welsh-born English novelist and biographer (born 1918)
  - Nathalie Sarraute, Russian-born French writer and lawyer (born 1900)
  - E. J. Scovell, English poet (born 1907)
- November 11 – Jacobo Timerman, Soviet-born Argentinian journalist and publisher (born 1923)
- November 18 – Paul Bowles, American novelist (born 1910)
- December 2 – Matt Cohen, Canadian novelist (born 1942)
- December 8 – Rupert Hart-Davis, English editor and publisher (born 1907)
- December 12 – Joseph Heller, American novelist (born 1923)

== Awards ==
- Nobel Prize for Literature: Günter Grass
- Camões Prize: Sophia de Mello Breyner

=== Australia ===
- The Australian/Vogel Literary Award: Hsu-Ming Teo, Love and Vertigo
- C. J. Dennis Prize for Poetry: Gig Ryan, Pure and Applied
- Kenneth Slessor Prize for Poetry: Lee Cataldi, Race Against Time
- Miles Franklin Award: Murray Bail, Eucalyptus

=== Canada ===
- Giller Prize for Canadian Fiction: Bonnie Burnard, A Good House
- See 1999 Governor General's Awards for a complete list of winners and finalists for those awards.
- Edna Staebler Award for Creative Non-Fiction: Michael Poole, Romancing Mary Jane

=== France ===
- Prix Femina: Maryline Desbiolles, Anchise
- Prix Goncourt: Jean Echenoz, Je m'en vais
- Prix Décembre: Claude Askolovitch, Voyage au bout de la France: Le Front National tel qu'il est
- Prix Médicis French: Michel Del Castillo, Colette, une certaine France
- Prix Médicis Non-Fiction: Christian Oster, Mon grand appartement
- Prix Médicis International: Björn Larsson, Le capitaine et les rêves

=== United Kingdom ===
- Booker Prize: J. M. Coetzee, Disgrace
- Carnegie Medal for children's literature: Aidan Chambers, Postcards from No Man's Land
- James Tait Black Memorial Prize for fiction: Timothy Mo, Renegade, or Halo2
- James Tait Black Memorial Prize for biography: Kathryn Hughes, George Eliot: The Last Victorian
- Cholmondeley Award: Vicki Feaver, Geoffrey Hill, Elma Mitchell, Sheenagh Pugh
- Eric Gregory Award: Ross Cogan, Matthew Hollis, Helen Ivory, Andrew Pidoux, Owen Sheers, Dan Wyke
- Orange Prize for Fiction: Suzanne Berne, A Crime in the Neighborhood
- Samuel Johnson Prize (first award): Antony Beevor, Stalingrad
- Whitbread Best Book Award: Seamus Heaney, Beowulf

=== United States ===
- Agnes Lynch Starrett Poetry Prize: Daisy Fried, She Didn't Mean To Do It
- Aiken Taylor Award for Modern American Poetry: George Garrett
- Arthur Rense Prize awarded to James McMichael by the American Academy of Arts and Letters
- Bernard F. Connors Prize for Poetry: J. D. McClatchy, "Tattoos"
- Compton Crook Award: James Stoddard, The High House
- Frost Medal: Barbara Guest
- Hugo Award for Best Novel: Connie Willis, To Say Nothing of the Dog
- National Book Award for Fiction: to Waiting by Ha Jin
- National Book Critics Circle Award: to Motherless Brooklyn by Jonathan Lethem
- Nebula Award: Octavia E. Butler, Parable of the Talents
- Newbery Medal for children's literature: Louis Sachar, Holes
- PEN/Faulkner Award for Fiction: to The Hours by Michael Cunningham
- Pulitzer Prize for Drama: Margaret Edson, Wit
- Pulitzer Prize for Fiction: Michael Cunningham, The Hours
- Pulitzer Prize for Poetry: Mark Strand, Blizzard of One
- Wallace Stevens Award: Jackson Mac Low
- Whiting Awards:

Fiction: Ehud Havazelet, Ben Marcus, Yxta Maya Murray, ZZ Packer
Nonfiction: Gordon Grice, Margaret Talbot
Plays: Naomi Iizuka
Poetry: Michael Haskell, Terrance Hayes, Martha Zweig

=== Elsewhere ===
- Finlandia Prize: 1999 Kristina Carlson, Maan ääreen
- Friedenspreis des Deutschen Buchhandels: Fritz Stern
- International Dublin Literary Award: Andrew Miller, Ingenious Pain
- Alfaguara Prize: Manuel Vicent, Son de mar
- Premio Nadal: Gustavo Martín Zarzo, Las historias de Marta y Fernando
- Viareggio Prize: Ernesto Franco, Vite senza fine

== Notes ==
- Hahn, Daniel (2015). The Oxford Companion to Children's Literature (2nd ed.). Oxford. University Press. ISBN 978-0-19-871554-2.
