= A Good House =

1999 novel by Bonnie Burnard

- 1st edition front cover
- Author: Bonnie Burnard
- Language: English
- Genre: Novel
- Publisher: Harper Flamingo
- Publication date: 1999
- Publication place: Canada
- Media type: Print (Hardcover)
- Pages: 309 pp
- ISBN: 000225526X
- OCLC: 43185943
- Dewey Decimal: 813/.54 21
- LC Class: PR9199.3.B7914 G66 2000
- Followed by: Suddenly

A Good House is the first novel by Canadian writer Bonnie Burnard, published by Picador in 1999 and later by Henry Holt and Company in the United States of America. It was the winner of that year's Scotiabank Giller Prize. The novel narrates the story of a family in three generations, five houses starting from 1949 until 1997.

== Plot ==
The story starts in 1949 in the small town of Stonebrook, Ontario, near Lake Huron and is about the Chambers family and starts in a hopeful era of post-World War II. Bill is an ex-Navy veteran who had been injured losing three fingers of his right hand in the war and he has three children with his wife Sylvia; Patrick, Daphne, and Paul. Daphne, when 12 years old, meets an accident in 1952 which deforms her face permanently and asymmetrically while performing acrobatics in a circus on trapeze. In 1955, Sylvia dies of cancer when aged 40 and Bill later marries Margaret. Margaret and Bill used to be co-workers at a hardware store. Margaret raises the three children and keeps the family together and has a daughter Sarah together with Bill.

The eldest brother Patrick becomes a lawyer, the youngest Paul gains popularity in hockey but eventually marries early, fathers an imperfect child and becomes a farmer. Daphne chooses an odd path for the time and becomes a single mother of two daughters. Paul dies at an early age. Bill steps into his old age not very gracefully suffering with dementia but Margaret still keeps the family in control. As time passes the novel travels till 1997 and the nuclear family diverges yet keeps meeting together to share happy and sad times.

== Publication ==
The book was published by Harper Flamingo in Canada in 1999 and later by Henry Holt and Company in the United States of America. It has ten chapters and is dedicated to poet Anne Szumigalski who had helped Burnard during her budding days in her literary career. Burnard said that the novel is about "the way I understand life to be". The minor character's names were based on friends of her own children. The book is edited by Phyllis Bruce and Jan Whitford was Burnard's agent for the publications. The novel narrates the story involving three generation and five houses with none of the characters talking in the first person. The novel was also published in the United States, the United Kingdom, Germany, and in twelve other countries from 1999 to 2002.

== Reception and reviews ==
The book was Burnard's first novel. She had earlier independently published two award-winning short story collections Women of Influence (1988) and Casino & Other Stories (1994) and had also co-written other short story collections. The debut novel became a best-seller in Canada. The Buffalo & Erie County Public Library notes Burnard's "remarkable ability to probe the hidden, often disturbing landscapes of love and to illuminate the complexities of human experience". Macmillan Publishers in their review call it "[an] extraordinarily moving and beautifully crafted first novel". Canadian author Carol Shields called it a "finest novel published in some years in our country" and appreciated its grace, generosity, and humanity. Louisa Kamps reviewing the book for The New York Times writes that "Burnard's painstaking focus on seemingly mundane details makes the events that shape her characters' lives not only believable but also somehow bigger than the moment, universally true." Valerie Ryan of The Seattle Times compared the simplicity of the narrative with American author Howard Norman's notable novel The Bird Artist. Kirkus Reviews compliment the character setting of the family members who "respond gallantly to love, death, and life's unexpected assaults on family happiness". Publishers Weekly notes the grace with which the "traditional generational saga" unfolds. Library Journal Review mentions of the title of the novel that "it isn't really a book about a house and has something to say about its solidity and graceful prose." Janice Harayda of The Baltimore Sun criticizes the novel for falling below the best work of "estimate writers" of Canada like Alice Munro, Margaret Atwood, and Michael Ondaatje and complains that the novel does a biased stand with Canadians over Americans in its 1970s narrative.

== Awards ==
Burnard won the Scotiabank Giller Prize for this debut novel. The jury for the award were anthologist and novelist Alberto Manguel, businesswoman and philanthropist Judith Mappin, and novelist Nino Ricci. Burnard was nominated for the award along with Timothy Findley (Pilgrim), Anne Hébert (Am I Disturbing You?), Nancy Huston (The Mark of the Angel), and David Macfarlane (Summer Gone). The prize included a cash remuneration of $25,000 and she thanked her editor Bruce and agent Whitford in the award's acceptance speech by saying, "We are three middle-aged women with grey hair and it's not a bad thing to be." The citation for the award reads that "[Burnard] imbues the apparently ordinary lives of her characters with an integrity and a depth of emotion that in the end make them unforgettable" and also mentions that "the novel gives us the sweep of whole lives lived so that we come away with what feels like wisdom, a sense of the moments that truly give value and meaning to a life."
