= Wilder Penfield =

Canadian neurosurgeon

Wilder Penfield OM CC CMG FRS
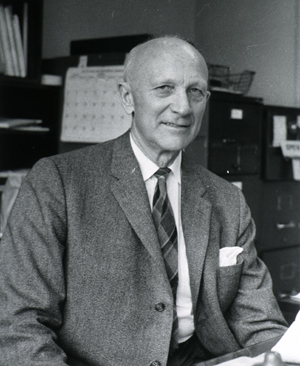
- Penfield in 1958
- Born: Wilder Graves Penfield; January 26, 1891; Spokane, Washington, U.S.
- Died: April 5, 1976 (aged 85); Montreal, Quebec, Canada
- Education: Princeton University; Merton College, Oxford; Johns Hopkins School of Medicine
- Known for: Prompting memory recall during surgery via temporal lobe stimulation; Treatment of epilepsy by surgery; Montreal procedure; Penfield dissector
- Awards: FRS (1943); Flavelle Medal (1951); Lister Medal (1960)
- Scientific career
- Fields: Neurosurgery
- Workplaces: Montreal Neurological Institute; McGill University
- Notable students: Laurence Levy

Wilder Graves Penfield OM CC CMG FRS (January 26, 1891 – April 5, 1976) was an American-Canadian neurosurgeon. He expanded brain surgery's methods and techniques, including mapping the functions of various regions of the brain such as the cortical homunculus. His scientific contributions on neural stimulation expand across a variety of topics including hallucinations, illusions, dissociation and déjà vu. Penfield devoted much of his thinking to mental processes, including contemplation of whether there was any scientific basis for the existence of the human soul.

== Life and career ==
=== Early life and education ===
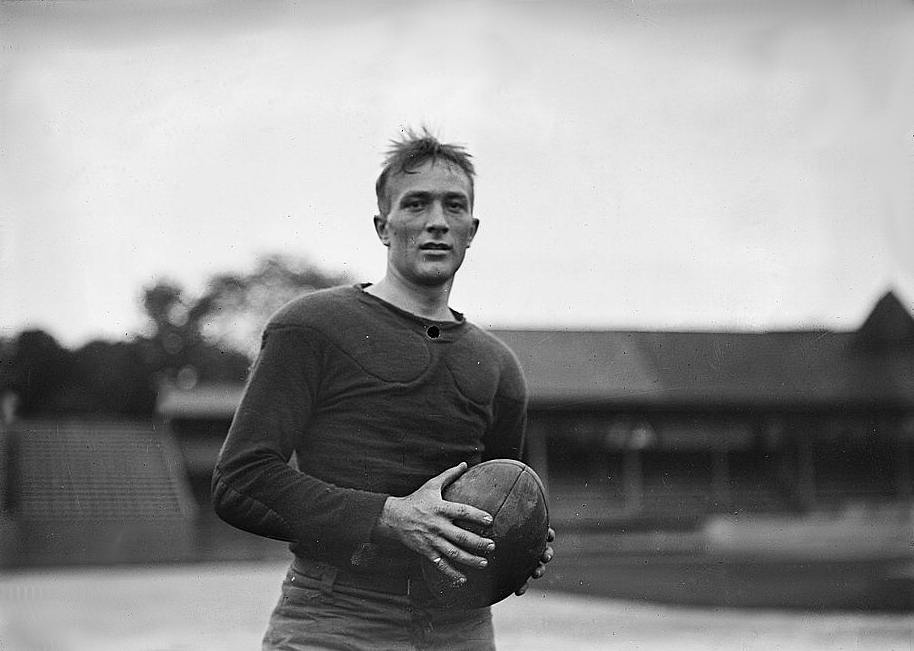
Penfield at Princeton University in 1913

Born in Spokane, Washington, on January 26, 1891, Penfield spent most of his early life in Hudson, Wisconsin where he attended the Galahad school. He played football for the Galahad team and later assisted coaching them. He later studied at Princeton University, where he was a member of Cap and Gown Club and played on the football team. After graduation in 1913, he was hired briefly as the team coach. In 1915 he obtained a Rhodes Scholarship to Merton College, Oxford, where he studied neuropathology under Sir Charles Scott Sherrington. After one term at Merton, Penfield went to France where he served as a dresser in a military hospital in the suburbs of Paris. He was wounded in 1916 when the ferry he was aboard, the SS Sussex, was torpedoed. The following year, he married Helen Kermott, and began studying at the Johns Hopkins School of Medicine, attaining his medical degree in 1918; this was followed by a short period as a house surgeon at the Peter Bent Brigham Hospital in Boston. Returning to Merton College in 1919, Penfield spent the next two years completing his studies; during this time he met Sir William Osler. In 1924, he worked for five months with Pío del Río Hortega characterising the type of glial cells known as oligodendroglia. He also studied in Germany with Fedor Krause and Otfrid Foerster, as well as in New York City. In 1928, during the 6 months he spent in Germany with Foerster, he learned how to use local anesthesia to keep brain surgery patients awake.

=== Medical career ===
After taking a surgical apprenticeship under Harvey Cushing, he obtained a position at the Neurological Institute of New York, where he carried out his first solo operations to treat epilepsy. While in New York, he met David Rockefeller, who wished to endow an institute where Penfield could further study the surgical treatment of epilepsy. Academic politics amongst the New York neurologists, however, prevented its establishment in New York, so, in 1928, Penfield accepted an invitation from Sir Vincent Meredith to move to Montreal, Quebec, Canada. There, Penfield taught at McGill University and the Royal Victoria Hospital, becoming the city's first neurosurgeon.

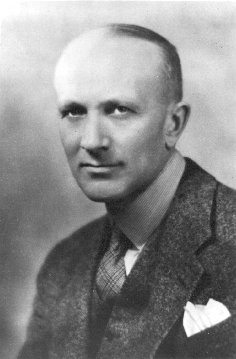
Penfield at Montreal Neurological Institute in 1934

In 1934, Penfield, along with William Cone (1897-1959), founded and became the first director of the Montreal Neurological Institute and Hospital at McGill University, established with the Rockefeller funding. That year, he also became a British subject (as part of the British Empire, there was no distinct Canadian citizenship until 1947).

Penfield was unable to save his only sister, Ruth, who died from brain cancer, though complex surgery he performed added years to her life.

Penfield was elected a Foreign Honorary Member of the American Academy of Arts and Sciences in 1950 and retired ten years later in 1960. He was a member of the United States National Academy of Sciences and the American Philosophical Society. He was appointed to the Order of Merit in the 1953 New Year Honours list. He turned his attention to writing, producing a novel as well as his autobiography No Man Alone. A later biography, Something Hidden, was written by his grandson Jefferson Lewis.

In 1960, the year he retired, Penfield was awarded the Lister Medal for his contributions to surgical science. He delivered the corresponding Lister Oration, "Activation of the Record of Human Experience", at the Royal College of Surgeons of England on April 27, 1961. In 1967, he was made a Companion of the Order of Canada and, in 1994, was posthumously inducted into the Canadian Medical Hall of Fame. Much of his archival material is housed in the Osler Library at McGill University.

=== Later life ===
In his later years, Penfield dedicated himself to the public interest, particularly in support of university education. With his friends Governor-General Georges Vanier and Pauline Vanier, he co-founded the Vanier Institute of the Family "to promote and guide education in the home – man's first classroom." He was also an early proponent of childhood bilingualism.

Penfield died on April 5, 1976, of abdominal cancer at Royal Victoria Hospital in Montreal. He and his wife, Helen, had their ashes buried on the family property in East Bolton (Bolton-Est), Quebec on Sargent's Bay, Lake Memphremagog.

== Scientific contributions ==
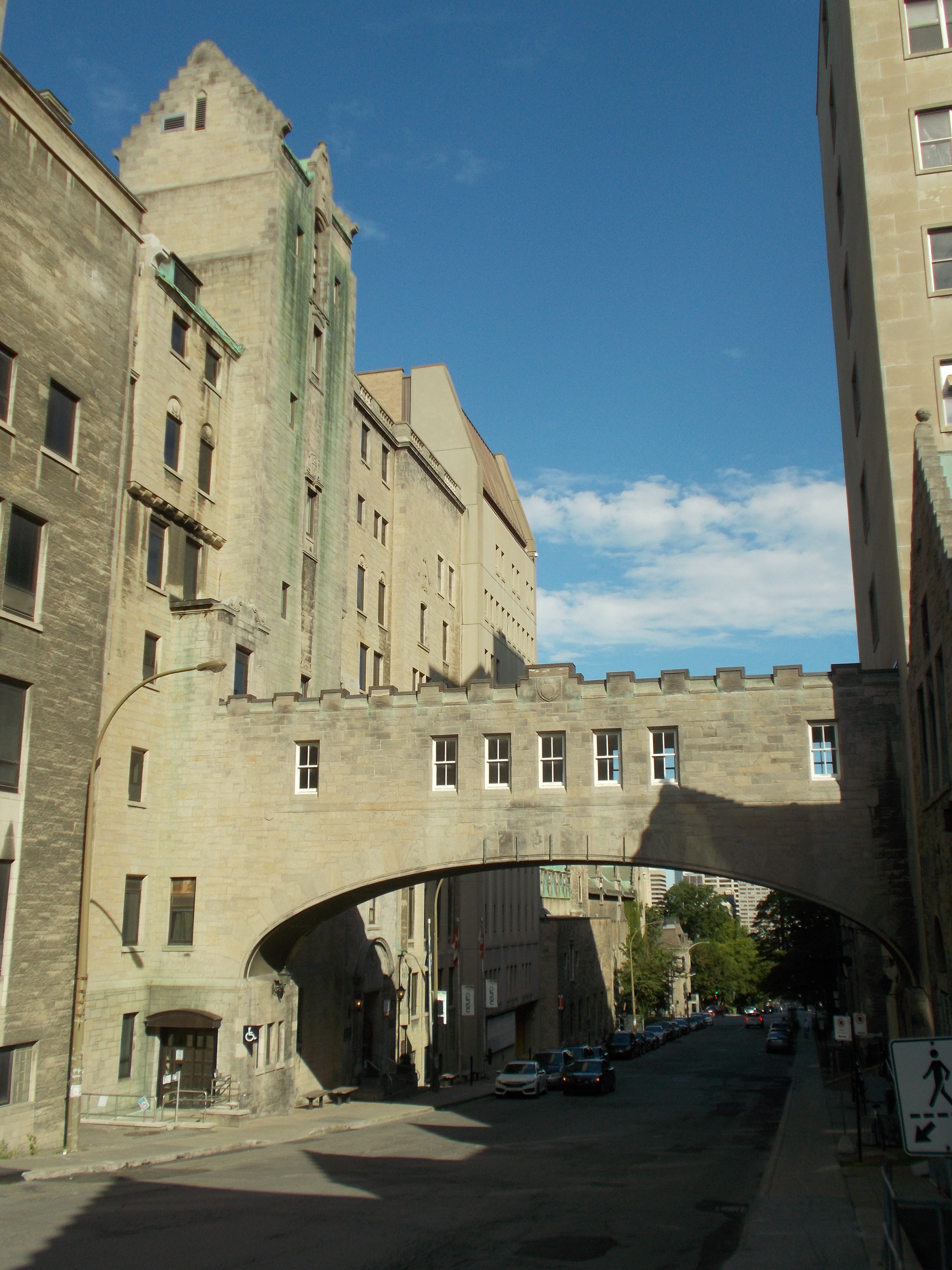
The Wilder Penfield Pavilion at McGill University

=== Neural stimulation ===
Penfield was a groundbreaking researcher and original surgeon. His development of a neurosurgical technique using an instrument known as the Penfield dissector, which produced the least injurious meningo-cerebral scar, became widely accepted in the field of neurosurgery and remains in regular use. With his colleague Herbert Jasper, he invented the "Montréal Procedure" in which he treated patients with severe epilepsy by destroying nerve cells in the brain where the seizures originated. Before operating, he stimulated the brain with electrical probes while the patients were conscious on the operating table (under only local anesthesia), and observed their responses. In this way he could more accurately target the areas of the brain responsible, reducing the side-effects of the surgery.

This technique also allowed him to create maps of the sensory and motor cortices of the brain (see cortical homunculus) showing their connections to the various limbs and organs of the body. These maps are still used today, practically unaltered. Along with Herbert Jasper, he published this work in 1951 (2nd ed., 1954) as the landmark Epilepsy and the Functional Anatomy of the Human Brain. This work contributed a great deal to understanding the localization of brain function. Penfield's maps showed considerable overlap between regions (e.g. the motor region controlling muscles in the hand sometimes also controlled muscles in the upper arm and shoulder) a feature which he put down to individual variation in brain size and localisation: it has since been established that this is due to the fractured somatotopy of the motor cortex. From these results he developed his cortical homunculus map, which is how the brain sees the body from an inside perspective.

Penfield reported that stimulation of the temporal lobes could lead to vivid recall of memories. Oversimplified in popular psychology publications, including the best-selling I'm OK – You're OK, this seeded the common misconception that the brain continuously "records" experiences in perfect detail, although these memories are not available to conscious recall. Reported episodes of recall occurred in less than five percent of his patients, though these results have been replicated by modern surgeons. Penfield's hypothesis on this subject was revised in 1970.

=== Hallucinations ===
Penfield's scientific contributions go past the somatosensory and the motor cortices; his extensive work of the functions of the brain also included charting the functions of the parietal and temporal cortices. Of his 520 patients, 40 reported that while their temporal lobe was stimulated with an electrode they would recall dreams, smells, visual and auditory hallucinations, as well as out-of-body experiences. In his studies, Penfield found that when the temporal lobe was stimulated it produced a combination of hallucinations, dream, and memory recollection. These experiences would only last as long as the electrode stimulations were present on the cortex, and in some cases when patient experienced hallucinatory experiences that evoked certain smells, sensations of flashing light, stroking the back of their hand, and many others. Other stimulations had patients experiencing déjà vu, fear, loneliness, and strangeness. Certain areas of patients' temporal lobes were stimulated with an electrode in order to experience memories. Penfield called these perceptual illusions (physical hallucinations) interpretive responses. According to Penfield, when the temporal lobe was stimulated there were two types of perceptions experienced by patients:

1. Experential experience – where the patient recorded hearing a song, or seeing a flash of light.
2. Strip experience – The recall seems familiar to the patient and comes from the patient's past even though the patient may not be able to pinpoint the exact occasion. The recall of a memory or memories could reinforce the emotion tied to the experience.

Penfield stressed that the "things that have been recorded are the things which once came within the spot-light of attention". Penfield had over 25 years of research using electrical stimulation to produce experiential hallucinations. His conclusions show that patients experience a range of hallucinations from simple to complex. They also show that hallucinations can be stimulated.

=== Déjà vu ===
Penfield's expansion of the interpretive cortex includes the phenomenon of déjà vu. Déjà vu is the sensation that an experience a person is having has previously been experienced. Déjà vu is typically experienced by people between the ages of 15 and 25, and affects approximately 60-70% of the population. It is thought to be a mismatch of the sensory input people receive and the system in which the brain recalls memory. Another thought on the cause of déjà vu is that there is a malfunction in the brain's short- and long-term memory systems where memories become stored in incorrect systems. There are several ways one can recognize familiar experiences – by mentally retrieving memories of a previous experience, or by having a feeling that an experience has occurred when it actually has not. Déjà vu is having that feeling of familiarity in a situation that is completely new. Memory is good at being familiar with objects; however it does not do well with the configuration or organization of objects. Déjà vu is an extreme reaction to the mind telling an individual that they are having a familiar experience. Déjà vu is thought to be a consistent phenomenon. However, it has been associated with epilepsy, and with multiple psychiatric disorders such as schizophrenia and anxiety, but there has not been a clear, frequent diagnostic correlation between déjà vu and neurological or psychiatric disorders, except with patients that have a possibility of being epileptic. Temporal lobe epilepsy affects the hippocampus. Patients that have this medical diagnosis are said to have a misfiring of the brain's neurons. The neurons transmit at random which results in the false sense of experiencing a familiar situation that had previously been experienced. Different types of déjà vu are difficult to pinpoint because researchers who have studied déjà vu have developed their own categories and differentiations. On a broad perspective of research that is available, déjà vu can be divided into two categories: associative déjà vu and biological déjà vu. Associative déjà vu is typically experienced by normal, healthy individuals who experience things with the senses that can be associated to other experiences or past events. Biological déjà vu occurs in individuals who have temporal lobe epilepsy. Their experience of déjà vu occurs usually just before they experience a seizure. Recent research is looking at the new occurrence of chronic déjà vu. Chronic déjà vu is when an individual is experiencing a constant state of déjà vu. Failure of the temporal lobe is thought to be the cause of this phenomenon because the circuits that connect to memories get stuck in an active state, and create memories that never happened.

== Global policy ==
He was one of the signatories of the agreement to convene a convention for drafting a world constitution. As a result, for the first time in human history, a World Constituent Assembly convened to draft and adopt the Constitution for the Federation of Earth.

== Legacy ==
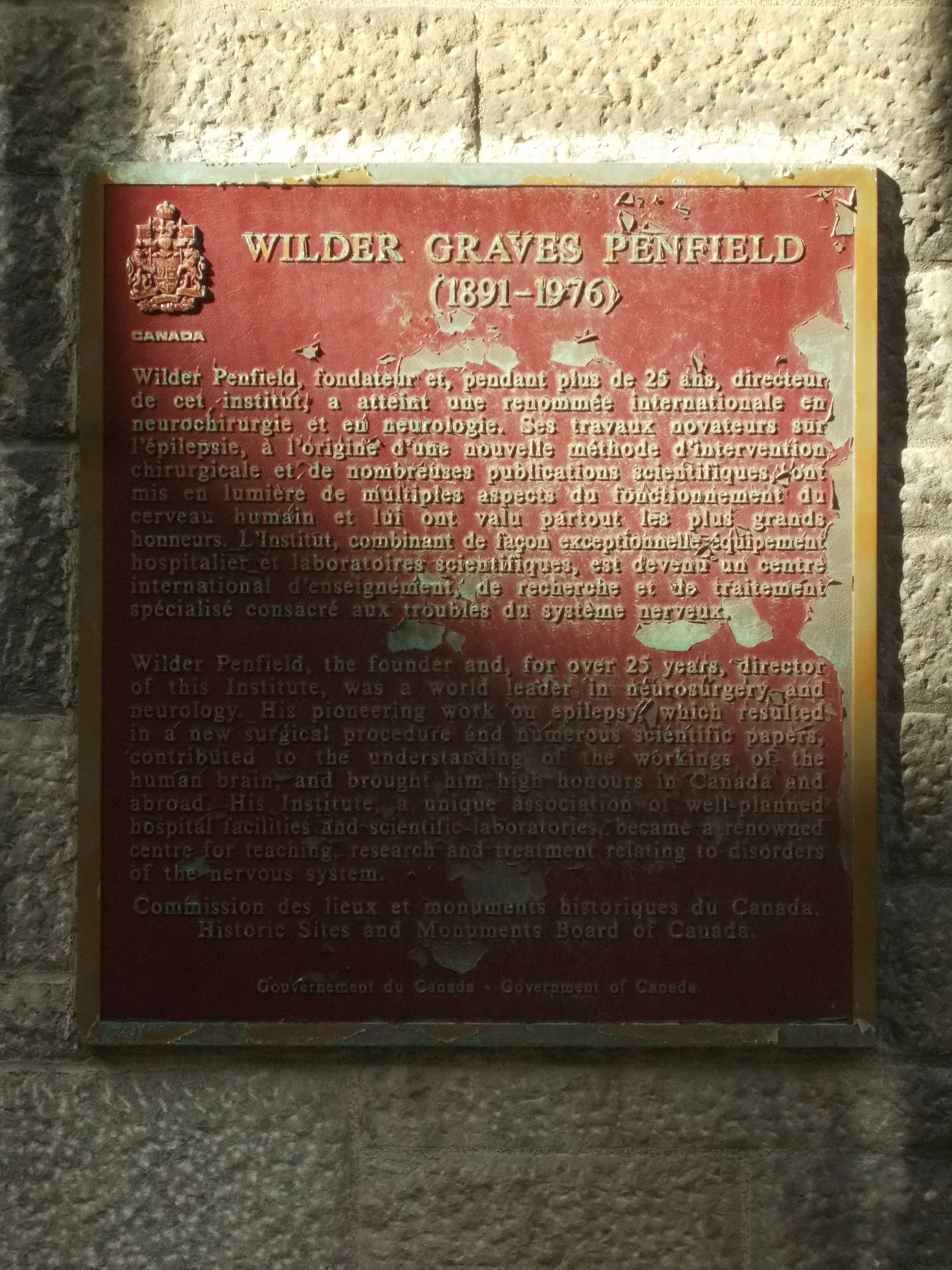
Federal marker to Penfield at the McGill University building that bears his name

Penfield was designated a National Historic Person in 1988 by the government of Canada. As such, a federal historical marker from the national Historic Sites & Monuments Board and Parks Canada was erected, located at a building that bears his name on University Street, part of the McGill University campus in Montreal.

A postage stamp honouring Penfield was issued by Canada Post on March 15, 1991.

Avenue du Docteur-Penfield (45.500342°N 73.583103°W), on the slope of Mount Royal in Montreal, was named in Penfield's honour on October 5, 1978. Part of this avenue borders McGill University's campus and intersects with Promenade Sir-William-Osler – meaning medical historians and the like may amuse themselves by arranging to "meet at Osler and Penfield".

A portrait of Wilder Penfield hangs in Rhodes House at the University of Oxford, England. Penfield was elected a Fellow of the Royal Society (FRS) of the United Kingdom in 1943.

In honour of Wilder Graves Penfield's contribution to the public sector in Montreal, notably alongside his interest in further developing education, Wilder Penfield Elementary School was also established as part of the Lester B. Pearson School Board.

Penfield building, one of John Abbott College's ten buildings, also bears the name of the famous neurosurgeon.

Penfield was the subject of a Google doodle on January 26, 2018, marking the 127th anniversary of his birth. The doodle appeared on the Google homepage in selected countries on five continents.

Penfield Children's Center In Milwaukee, Wisconsin, is named for Dr. Penfield for his advocacy of early intervention for children with developmental delays and disabilities.

In 2025, Penfield was posthumously named the receipient of thr Dr. Charles L. Branch BrainHealth Award by the Centre for BrainHealth.

== Eponyms ==
- Penfield's homunculus (neuroanatomic feature first characterized by Penfield in 1937)
- Penfield syndrome (a form of autonomic epileptic seizure)
- Penfield dissector (a type of surgical instrument used in neurosurgery and other disciplines)

== Honorary degrees ==
Penfield was awarded many honorary degrees in recognition of his medical career. These include:

State/Province	Date	School	Degree
New Jersey	1939	Princeton University	Doctor of Science (D.Sc.)
British Columbia	30 October 1946	University of British Columbia	Doctor of Science (D.Sc.)
Saskatchewan	29 September 1959	University of Saskatchewan	Doctor of Laws (LL.D)
Ontario	1953	University of Toronto	Doctor of Science (D.Sc.)
England	1953	University of Oxford	---
Manitoba	1955	University of Manitoba	Doctor of Science (D.Sc.)
Ontario	1957	Queen's University	Doctor of Laws (LL.D)
Quebec	6 October 1960	McGill University	Doctor of Science (D.Sc.)
Quebec	/	Bishop's University	Honorary Graduate
Ontario	May 1962	McMaster University	Doctor of Science (D.Sc.)
Alberta	29 March 1967	University of Calgary	---
Ontario	16 May 1970	Royal Military College of Canada	Doctor of Science (D.Sc.)
Ontario	21 September 1972	University of Western Ontario	Doctor of Science (D.Sc.)

== In popular culture ==
- Wilder Penfield was the subject of a Heritage Minute, dramatizing his development of the Montreal procedure. When Dr. Penfield stimulates the seizure-producing part of her brain, an epileptic patient exclaims: "I can smell burnt toast!" This Heritage Minute was widely shown and again made Penfield a household name in Canada.
- In Robert J. Sawyer's 2012 novel Triggers, it is revealed that the major character of Dr. Ranjip Singh, a Canadian, was inspired to pursue his career in neuroscience by having seen the "I can smell burnt toast" Heritage Minute about Penfield.
- In science fiction author Philip K. Dick's Do Androids Dream of Electric Sheep?, characters use a household device called a Penfield Mood Organ to dial up emotions on demand.
- Masamune Shirow's anime series Ghost Hound makes several references to Penfield and his studies.
- The song "Wilder Penfield" by the Dead Sea Apes, a UK-based psychedelic rock group, from The Sun Behind The Sun, a collaboration with Black Tempest released in February 2013 on Cardinal Fuzz records.
- In Ray Loriga's 1999 novel Tokio ya no nos quiere, Penfield's method of stimulating the temporal lobes is described and modified to treat the main character who has issues with memory recollection.
- In the video game Xenosaga Episode I: Der Wille zur Macht, "Penfield Mapping" is seemingly the process of drawing a cortical homunculus, necessary for one to enter a virtual environment.
- Wilder Penfield's, Sensory & Motor Homunculus 3D figures have been on permanent exhibition in the National History Museum, London. Penfield's Homunculi have become popular exhibits.

== Head coaching record ==
Between his graduation from Princeton and his studies at Oxford, Penfield served as Princeton's head football coach for one season.

Year	Team	Overall	Conference	Standing	Bowl/playoffs
Princeton Tigers (Independent) (1914)
1914	Princeton	5–2–1			
Princeton:		5–2–1			
Total:		5–2–1			

== Selected books and publications ==
=== Books ===
- Cytology and Cellular Pathology of the Nervous System. By various authors. Edited by W. Penfield. Three volumes, 1280 pages, 1932 (read online)
- Epilepsy and Cerebral Localization: A Study of the Mechanism, Treatment and Prevention of Epileptic Seizures. By Wilder Penfield and Theodore C. Erickson. Chapter XIV by Herbert H. Jasper. Chapter XX by M. R. Harrower-Erickson. Charles C. Thomas, 1941. OCLC 716544137
- Penfield, Wilder (1941). Canadian Army of Military Neurosurgery. Ottawa: Government Distribution Office. (read online)
- Penfield, W.; Rasmussen, T. B. (1950). The Cerebral Cortex of Man. OCLC 645750713.
- Penfield, Wilder; Kristiansen, Kristian (1951). Epileptic seizure patterns; a study of the localizing value of initial phenomena in focal cortical seizures,. Springfield, Ill.: Thomas. OCLC 3385089.
- Epilepsy and the Functional Anatomy of the Human Brain. 2nd edition. Jasper, H., and Penfield, W. Little, Brown and Co., 1954. ISBN 0-316-69833-4
- Penfield, W. (1958). The Excitable Cortex in Conscious Man. OCLC 1055881925. (read online)
- Speech and Brain Mechanisms, Penfield, Wilder and Roberts, Lamar, Princeton University Press, 1959. (read online)
- The Torch, a story of Hippocrates. Penfield, W. Little, Brown and Co.; 1960. ISBN 1-299-80119-6. (Historical novel) "A story of love, treachery, and the battle for truth in ancient Greece." (read online)
- The Mystery of the Mind : A Critical Study of Consciousness and the Human Brain. Penfield, Wilder. Princeton University Press, 1975. ISBN 0-691-02360-3 (read online)
- No Man Alone: A Neurosurgeon's Life, Little, Brown and Co., 1977. ISBN 0-316-69839-3. Penfield's autobiography. (read online)
- Something hidden: a biography of Wilder Penfield. Jefferson Lewis, Doubleday and Co., 1981. ISBN 0-385-17696-1. (read online)

=== Articles ===
- Foerster O., Penfield Wilder (1930). "The Structural Basis of Traumatic Epilepsy and Results of Radical Operation". Brain. 53 (2): 99–119. doi:10.1093/brain/53.2.99. hdl:11858/00-001M-0000-002B-0D28-A.
- Penfield W (1930). "The Radical Treatment of Traumatic Epilepsy and ITS Rationale". Can Med Assoc J. 23 (2): 189–197. PMC 381999. PMID 20317931.
