= To Russia with Fries =

Autobiography of George Cohon

To Russia with Fries: My Adventures in Canada and Russia — Having Fun Along the Way
- Author: George Cohon with David Macfarlane
- Language: English
- Publisher: McClelland & Stewart Inc.
- Publication date: 1997
- Publication place: Canada
- ISBN: 0-7710-2198-4
- OCLC: 1040019049
- Dewey Decimal: 338.76164795092

To Russia with Fries: My Adventures in Canada and Russia — Having Fun Along the Way is the autobiography of George Cohon, the Canadian-born American executive who founded McDonald's of Canada and McDonald's of Russia. The book covers that span of his life, from the 1960s to 1990s.

Cohon worked with David Macfarlane as co-author, his name also appearing on the cover. Macfarlane received acclaim in 1991 for a family memoir, The Danger Tree, and worked as an arts columnist for The Globe and Mail. Of the experience, Cohon told the Globe that "I never realized how hard it is to write. I saw the pressures both of us had writing this thing — the time required and our deadlines — and that kind of stuff never entered my head before."

Cohon's royalties from the book went to the Ronald McDonald House Charities Canada, which he founded. Between those funds, and money raised during a national book tour, Cohon hoped to raise $1 million. Philanthropist Joan Kroc — wife of the late Ray Kroc — pledged to match Cohon's fundraising, and if he succeeded in reaching the goal of $1 million, contribute an extra million.

The book entered the Canadian national non-fiction bestseller list compiled October 26, 1997, at 9th place.
