= Skattejakten =

Skattejakten may refer to:

- Skattejakten, a 2005 film directed by Thomas Kaiser.
- Skattejakten, a short novel by Margit Sandemo from 1999.
