= Theresa: The Body of Christ =

- Film poster
- Spanish: Teresa, el cuerpo de Cristo
- Directed by: Ray Loriga
- Written by: Ray Loriga
- Produced by: Andrés Vicente Gómez
- Starring: Paz Vega; Leonor Watling; Geraldine Chaplin
- Cinematography: José Luis Alcaine
- Edited by: Pablo Blanco
- Music by: Ángel Illarramendi; Michael Nyman
- Production companies: Iberoamericana Films; Future Films; Artédis
- Release date: 9 March 2007 (Spain)
- Running time: 97 minutes
- Countries: Spain; United Kingdom; France
- Language: Spanish
- Budget: $10,000,000 (estimated)

Theresa: The Body of Christ (Spanish: Teresa, el cuerpo de Cristo) is a 2007 biopic written and directed by Ray Loriga and starring Paz Vega as the title character, Saint Teresa of Ávila. It is a Spanish–British–French co-production.

== Cast ==
- Paz Vega as Santa Teresa.
- Leonor Watling as Doña Guiomar de Ulloa.
- Geraldine Chaplin.
- Álvaro de Luna.
- Ángel de Andrés.
- Manuel Morón.
- Francesc Garrido.
- José Luis Gómez as Fray Pedro de Alcántara.
- Eusebio Poncela as Gaspar Daza.

== Production ==
A joint Spain–United Kingdom–France co-production, the film was produced by Iberoamericana Films, Future Films and Artédis. Shooting locations include the Ciudad de la Luz in Alicante, Ávila, Portugal, Trujillo, Soria and Segovia.

== Release ==
The film was theatrically released in Spain on 9 March 2007.

== Reception ==
The Spanish Episcopal Conference did not like the film: the Spanish bishops criticised the film for its erotic representation of the saint's visions, exemplified by the poster's depiction of the hand of Christ touching the arm of the naked Teresa.

== See also ==
- List of Spanish films of 2007
