= Frederic S. Durbin =

American writer

- Born: Taylorville, Illinois, U.S.
- Education: Concordia College
- Occupations: Novelist, short story writer
- Spouse: Dr. Julie Durbin
- Writing career
- Genres: fantasy, horror
- Website: www.fredericsdurbin.com

Frederic S. Durbin is an American writer and novelist of fantasy and horror.

Durbin's first novel, Dragonfly, was published by Arkham House in 1999. It was nominated for an International Horror Guild Award for Best First Novel. His second novel, The Star Shard, was published by Houghton Mifflin Harcourt in 2012. A Green and Ancient Light (edited by Navah Wolfe) was published by Saga Press in 2016. Durbin's most recent novel, The Country Under Heaven, was published by Melville House Publishing in 2025.

== Biography ==
Frederic S. Durbin was born in Taylorville, Illinois. He graduated from Taylorville High School and attended Concordia College where he graduated summa cum laude. He taught English at Niigata University in Japan from 1989 to 2011. He is married to Dr. Julie Durbin, a humanities professor at Geneva College in Beaver Falls, PA.

== Bibliography ==
=== Novels ===
- Dragonfly (Arkham House, 1999)
- The Star Shard (Houghton Mifflin Harcourt, 2012)
- A Green and Ancient Light (Saga Press, 2016)
- The Country Under Heaven (Melville House, 2025)

=== Short fiction ===
A more complete bibliography available here

Title	Year	First published	Reprinted/collected	Notes
The place of roots	2001	"The place of roots". F&SF. 100 (2): 117–123. Feb 2001.		
