= The Boar (novel) =

1998 novel by Joe R. Lansdale

- Subterranean Press issue cover by Mark A. Nelson
- Author: Joe R. Lansdale
- Cover artist: Mark A. Nelson
- Language: English
- Publisher: Subterranean Press, Night Shade Books
- Publication date: November 1998
- Publication place: United States
- Media type: Print - Limited edition Hardcover, Trade Hardcover
- Pages: 169
- ISBN: 1-892284-03-0
- Preceded by: Tarzan: the Lost Adventure (1995)
- Followed by: Freezer Burn (novel) (1999)

The Boar is a 1998 novel written by American author Joe R. Lansdale, set in East Texas in 1933 during the Great Depression.

== Plot summary ==
The story is about young Richard Dale and his family who wind up terrorized by an extremely large wild boar. Richard and his brother Ike venture into the river bottoms in search of the boar they name Old Satan. Hunting an animal this size proves to be dangerous and as the story unfolds Richard finds himself taking bigger risks as he ventures deeper and deeper into the deep woods of the Big Thicket.

== Editions ==
This book was first published by Subterranean Press as a limited edition in November 1998. It was reissued as a trade hardcover in 2005 by Night Shade Books. The limited edition is out of print.
