= Klipgooi =

Klipgooi is the title of the 1999 Afrikaans novel (ISBN 0-7981-3963-3), written by the South African author François Bloemhof and is also the name of the fictional town which forms the setting for the story within the novel.

== Writing style and structure of the novel ==
Klipgooi is distinctive for the way in which the story is told (teller perspective) and the structure in which the story is told (structure).

=== Teller perspective ===
In Klipgooi, François Bloemhof tells the story of what exactly happened in Klipgooi in 1984 from the perspective of 14 different characters, including one more important character, forming the backbone of the novel. Each chapter in the novel is told from one of these 14 characters perspectives, giving the reader a unique insight into the thoughts and deeper feelings of each of these characters due to each character narrating their own chapters (i.e. 14 1st person perspectives are used in the novel).

=== Structure ===
Klipgooi is divided into 3 separate sections, each denoting one day in a fateful weekend in August 1984 in the small town community of Klipgooi. Furthermore, the story occurs both in the past and in the present, with a single, more important character visiting the restructured town in the present day, whilst the true events that occurred in August 1984, and which causes this main character to is depicted in the past. Each chapter depicting the events of the past, is also preceded with an analog watch indicating the time of day, thereby giving the reader the exact date and time that a certain event occurred. Each chapter is also preceded by a quote (seemingly random) from the chapter that follows.

== Plot ==
The story starts off from the perspective of a person (whose gender is at first unknown) that returns to the town of their childhood (Klipgooi) for reasons also as yet unknown. As the story continues, it becomes evident that this person, a woman, has come back to the town of Klipgooi to face the demons from her past. She is however, at first very scared and on edge upon her return as she is scared that some of the residents that resided in the town from her childhood, may still be present and may recognise her.

As she starts walking through the town the chapters from her past begins to play out and the reader is given an insight into what exactly happened in this woman's past that has left her with such a deep scar and a seeming genuine fear for the town.
