= Barbara Diamond Goldin =

American children's book author

- Born: Barbara Diamond; New York City, New York, US
- Education: University of Chicago (1968); Simmons University (MLIS, 2008)
- Writing career
- Notable work: Journeys with Elijah (1999)
- Notable awards: National Jewish Book Award (1989); Sydney Taylor Book Award (1991); Sydney Taylor Body-of-Work Award (1997)
- Website: barbaradiamondgoldin.com

Barbara Diamond Goldin is an American children's book author. In 1997, she received the Sydney Taylor Book Award for her body of work. She also won the 1989 National Jewish Book Award for Children's Picture Book for her debut children's book, Just Enough Is Plenty, as well as the 1991 Sydney Taylor Book Award for Cakes and Miracles: A Purim Tale.

== Biography ==
Barbara Diamond was born into a Jewish family and grew up in New York City with her parents and two younger brothers; her family moved to Philadelphia when she was eight years old. She studied education at the University of Chicago, graduating in 1968. That year, Diamond married fellow teacher Alan Goldin.

Goldin began her career as a public school teacher in Gloucester, Massachusetts. After a few years, she received a master's degree in special education from Boston College. Following two years teaching special education, she decided to focus on preschool education.

The Goldins then moved to Missoula, Montana, after which Goldin decided to train in Montessori education. To do so, she spent a summer in Michigan, followed by a school year in Yellow Springs, Ohio. When she returned to Missoula, she began teaching at a Montessori preschool and opened a children's bookstore with a friend. However, after Alan completed further studies in forestry and soils, the couple moved to Goldendale, Washington, at which point Goldin sold her share of the bookstore.

While in Goldendale, Goldin worked as a children's librarian. However, after two years, the couple resettled in Bellingham, Washington for Alan's work. There, Goldin began focusing on writer, including taking courses at Western Washington University. Goldin also gave birth to her two children.

Eight years after moving to Bellingham, the Goldin family relocated to Amherst, Massachusetts. Goldin and Alan divorced, after which Goldin focused even more intently on writing, though she also continued teaching until 2001. She published her first book, Just Enough Is Plenty: A Hanukkah Tale, in 1988. The book was named a notable selection for the 1988 Sydney Taylor Book Award, and won the 1989 National Jewish Book Award for Children's Picture Book. Goldin continued publishing books relating to Judaism, as well as historical fiction.

After enrolling at Simmons University in 2008, Goldin earned a Master of Library and Information Services, after which she returned to work as a librarian.

== Awards and honours ==
In 1996, The Horn Book Magazine named Coyote and the Fire Stick among the year's best children's books.

In 1997, Goldin received the Sydney Taylor Book Award for her body of work. In 2000, the Association for Library Service to Children included Journeys with Elijah on their annual list of Notable Children's Books; the Notable Social Studies Trade Books For Young People also named it among recommended books for folktales, myths and legends.

Awards for Goldin's works
Year	Work	Award	Result	Ref.
1988	Just Enough Is Plenty: A Hanukkah Tale	Sydney Taylor Book Award	Notable	
1989	Just Enough Is Plenty: A Hanukkah Tale	National Jewish Book Award for Children's Picture Book	Winner	
1990	The World's Birthday: A Rosh Hashana Story	Sydney Taylor Book Award	Honor	
1991	Cakes and Miracles: A Purim Tale	Sydney Taylor Book Award	Winner	
1993	The Magician's Visit	Sydney Taylor Book Award	Notable	
1995	Night Lights: A Sukkot Story	Sydney Taylor Book Award	Notable	
2001	A Mountain of Blintzes	Sydney Taylor Book Award	Notable	
2002	Night Lights: A Sukkot Story	Sydney Taylor Book Award	Notable	
2011	Cakes and Miracles: A Purim Tale	Sydney Taylor Book Award	Honor	

== Publications ==
- Just Enough Is Plenty: A Hanukkah Tale. Illustrated by Seymour Chwast. Viking. 1988. ISBN 9780670818525.
- The World's Birthday: A Rosh Hashanah Story. Illustrated by Jeanette Winter. Houghton Mifflin Harcourt. 1990. ISBN 978-0-15-299648-2.
- Cakes and Miracles. Illustrated by Erika Weihs. Viking Children's Books. 1991. ISBN 978-0-670-83047-3.
  - Cakes and Miracles: A Purim Tale. Illustrated by Jaime Zollars. Marshall Cavendish. 2010. ISBN 978-0-7614-5701-5.
- The Magician's Visit: A Passover Tale. Adapted from I. L. Peretz; Illustrated by Robert Andrew Parker. Viking Children's Books. 1993. ISBN 978-0-670-84840-9.
  - The Magician's Visit: A Passover Tale. Adapted from I. L. Peretz; Illustrated by Eva Sánchez Gómez. Green Bean Books. 2021.
- The Passover Journey: A Seder Companion. Illustrated by Neil Waldman. Viking Children's Books. 1994. ISBN 978-0-670-82421-2.
- Bat Mitzvah: A Jewish Girl's Coming of Age. Viking Children's Books. 1995. ISBN 978-0-670-86034-0.
- Night Lights: A Sukkot Story. Illustrated by Louise August. Gulliver Books. 1995.
  - Night Lights: A Sukkot Story. Illustrated by Lauren Sucher. URJ Books and Music and Behrman House. 2002.
  - Night Lights: A Sukkot Story. Illustrated by Amberin Huq. Apples & Honey. 2020.
- Creating Angels: Stories of Tzedakah. Jason Aronson. 1996.
- Coyote and the Fire Stick: A Pacific Northwest Indian Tale. Illustrated by Will Hillenbrand. Harcourt Children's Books. 1996. ISBN 978-0-15-200438-5.
- Red Means Good Fortune: A Story of San Francisco's Chinatown. Illustrated by Wenhai Ma. Puffin Books. 1996. ISBN 0140360824.
- While the Candles Burn: Eight Stories for Hanukkah. Illustrated by Elaine Greenstein. Viking Children's Books. 1996. ISBN 978-0-670-85875-0.
- Fire! The Beginnings of the Labor Movement. llustrated by James Watling. Puffin Books. 1997. ISBN 0140346856.
- The Girl Who Lived with the Bears. Illustrated by Andrew Plewes. Harcourt Children's Books. 1997. ISBN 978-0-15-200684-6.
- Journeys with Elijah: Eight Tales of the Prophet. Paintings by Jerry Pinkney. Harcourt Children's Books. 1999. ISBN 978-0-15-200445-3.
- Ten Holiday Jewish Children's Stories. Illustrated by Jeffrey Allon. Pitspopany Press. 2000. ISBN 0943706475.
- A Mountain of Blintzes. Illustrated by Anik McGrory. Harcourt. 2001. ISBN 978-0761457909.
- The Family Book of Midrash: Fifty-Two Jewish Stories from the Sagesa. Rowan & Littelfield Publishers. 2006.
- The Best Hanukkah Ever. Illustrated by Avi Katz. Marshall Cavendish. 2007. ISBN 978-0-7614-5355-0.
- Never Too Quiet. Illustrated by Amanda Hall. PJ Publishing. 2016.
- The Passover Cowboy. Illustrated by Gina Capaldi. Apples & Honey. 2017. ISBN 978-1-68115-527-2.
- Meet Me at the Well: The Girls and Women of the Bible. Co-authored with Jane Yolen; Illustrated by Vali Mintzi. Apples & Honey. 2018.
- A Persian Princess. Illustrated by Steliyana Doneva. Apples & Honey. 2020.
- Benjy's Messy Room. Illustrated by Rita Tan. Apples & Honey. 2024.
