= Here Comes Mother Goose =

1999 picture book by Iona Opie

- Author: Iona Opie (editor)
- Illustrator: Rosemary Wells
- Language: English
- Genre: Children's picture book
- Published: 1999 (Candlewick Press)
- Publication place: England
- Media type: Print (hardback)
- Pages: 107
- ISBN: 9780763606831
- OCLC: 40856903

Here Comes Mother Goose is a children's picture book by Iona Opie. It is a collection of 56 Mother Goose nursery rhymes, chosen by Opie and is the second such collaboration between her and illustrator Rosemary Wells.

== Reception ==
A Horn Book review of Here Comes Mother Goose wrote "This companion volume to My Very First Mother Goose (rev. 11/96) is even more successful than the first-more cohesive in terms of quality of art and totality of design, more venturesome in the selection of the nursery rhymes." and the School Library Journal found it "another captivating collection" concluding "Make room on the shelves for this must-have title." The New York Times especially commended the illustrator, writing "Wells .. is at the height of her powers in this generously large-format book, where she can stir a little mischief into the mix." and found it "a lovely assortment".

Kirkus Reviews concluded "in general the book is plainly the work of a match made in heaven, and merits as much popularity as its predecessor." and Publishers Weekly in a star review wrote "Even if this volume isn't quite as illuminating as Opie and Wells's My Very First Mother Goose, it abounds with charm and wit; there is no one like Opie for collecting traditional verse, and no one like Wells for radiant, childlike visual interpretation." and concluded "Beautiful and beguiling, this book will win over just about everyone."

Parents' Choice awarded it a 1999 Gold Award for picture books, wrote "she (Mother Goose) receives a fresh interpretation in this large, hold-on-the-lap volume. Rhymes familiar and uncommon are cheerfully illustrated with Wells' charming animals and the occasional pineapple."

Here Comes Mother Goose has also been reviewed by Booklist, Parenting, Reading Time, The Reading Teacher, Teacher Librarian, and Good Housekeeping.

It has been recommended for babies and toddlers, and is a 2000 American Library Association Notable Children's Book.
