= Artédis =

French film distributor

Artédis is a French film distributor founded in 1983. The company releases four to six films a year, and concentrates mainly on releasing European fare.

Notable releases from the company's library of over 100 films include Nelvana's The Care Bears Movie (1985), Roland Emmerich's Moon 44 (1990) and the 2000 Leslie Nielsen comedy 2001: A Space Travesty, one of its most successful to date.

== See also ==
- Gaumont
- Pathé
- StudioCanal
