= Summer Gone =

1999 novel by David Macfarlane

- A paperback edition of Summer Gone.
- Author: David Macfarlane
- Cover artist: Tamara Reynolds (photograph), CS Richardson (design)
- Language: English
- Publisher: Knopf Canada
- Publication date: 1999
- Publication place: Canada
- Media type: Print (Hardback & Paperback)
- Pages: 266 pp
- ISBN: 0-676-97190-3
- OCLC: 40051475
- Preceded by: The Danger Tree
- Followed by: Fishwrap

Summer Gone is the first novel by Canadian writer David Macfarlane. Published in 1999 by Knopf Canada, Summer Gone was a national bestseller in Canada. It was nominated for the Giller Prize, and won the Books in Canada First Novel Award.

== Plot summary ==
The book deals with the life of Bailey Newling and his three lost summers. It tells the story of a divorced Bailey and his young son Caz, where on one fateful canoe trip, they share a remarkable night of truth and love.

Macfarlane set this novel among the cottage country in northern Ontario, the Waubano Reaches. Bailey, nicknamed Bay, tells of the three summers in his life: the summer he was 12 and attended the camp where he met his camp instructor Peter Larkin, the summer where he, his wife Sarah and 6-year-old son rented a cottage near his old campsite and, the summer where he and his 12-year-old son shared their extraordinary night.

Macfarlane uses a notable technique in the writing of Summer Gone, where he would start the story of one summer and drift into another. It may start with Bay telling of his tale at camp and then shift onto another thought which may have occurred decades later involving his wife or his son. This technique ties all of Bay's summer stories together into one when he tells it to his son. The narration of this story is told by Caz's half brother, from a one-night stand of Bailey's, as an adult, retelling what Caz had told him.
