= Freezer Burn (novel) =

1999 novel by Joe R. Lansdale

- Cover art by George Pratt
- Author: Joe R. Lansdale
- Cover artist: George Pratt
- Language: English
- Publisher: Crossroads Press, Mysterious Press
- Publication date: September 1999
- Publication place: United States
- Media type: Print - Limited edition Hardcover, Trade Hardcover, Trade paperback
- Pages: 245
- ISBN: 978-0986259425
- Preceded by: The Boar (novel) (1995)
- Followed by: Waltz of Shadows (1999)

Freezer Burn is a 1999 crime novel by American writer Joe R. Lansdale.

== Plot summary ==
Down on his luck, loner, loser, Bill Roberts tries his hand at robbing the fireworks stand across the road from his house. Things don't go well, and he barely escapes with his life into an East Texas swamp. A day later, his head swollen with insect bites, he stumbles into a low rent traveling freak show carnival. His appearance allows him to fit in, and seeing no other way to escape his predicament, he joins the group and travels with them putting on shows.

Befriended by the group's leader, John Frost, who has a dead twin's arm attached to his chest, Bill soon has eyes for John's luscious wife Gidget who is, besides Bill, the only non-freak among them. The show's main attraction is the mysterious Iceman, who has his own trailer. Soon Frost trusts Bill with running the Iceman act. As Bill gets closer to Gidget, he soon realizes she has plans of her own, and remaining the wife of a sideshow freak is not one of them.

== Editions ==
This book was published both as a limited edition by Crossroads Press and as a trade hardcover by Mysterious Press. It has been re-issued as a trade paperback by several different publishing houses.

Mysterious Press edition
