= Janice Harayda =

American author

- Born: July 31, 1949 (age 76); New Brunswick, New Jersey, US
- Occupation: Writer

Janice Harayda (born July 31, 1949) is an American author, newspaper writer, and book reviewer. She has worked for multiple magazines and has taught in colleges. Her writing includes five books and a blog with book reviews.

== Personal life and career ==
Harayda was born on July 31, 1949, in New Brunswick, New Jersey, to John and Marel Harayda. She attended the University of New Hampshire and received a cum laude Bachelor of Arts degree. Harayda enjoys listening to opera, watching theater, doing ballet, traveling, and dancing.

In 1974, Harayda was responsible for starting an all-woman church service at Park Avenue Methodist Church in New York City. She once said that her Episcopal faith is the most important thing in her life.

Harayda was an editorial assistant for the magazine Mademoiselle and senior editor of the magazine Glamour. In late 1981, while working as the editorial director for Boston magazine, Harayda leveled sexual-harassment charges against the publication during an editorial meeting and was promptly fired. From 1981 to 1987, she was a freelance writer, and she was an editor for The Plain Dealer from 1987 to 1998. She was editor-in-chief for New Jersey Lifestyle Magazine in 1998. Harayda taught writing at Marymount Manhattan College in 1977, journalism at Boston University in 1979, and journalism at Fordham University in 2005. She wrote the books Women: A Book for Men (1979), Titters (1979), The Joy of Being Single (1986), The Accidental Bride (1999), and Manhattan on the Rocks (2004). Despite writing The Joy of Being Single, she has said that she is not against marriage. Harayda writes the blog One-Minute Book Reviews.

== Reception ==
In 2010, Harayda was listed as one of the best book reviewers on Twitter by Adweek's Galley Cat blog.

Vince Brewton, writing for Foreword Reviews, stated that the book Manhattan on the Rocks "will make readers laugh out loud, and the Hungarian-American, basketball-playing heroine is more human than one might expect". The Chico Enterprise-Record wrote a positive review of The Joy of Being Single, concluding with: "At times there is an unspoken assumption that marriage is the ultimate goal, yet the book's point is that being single can be a joy".

Joanne Kaufman of the Chicago Tribune reviewed The Accidental Bride, stating: "Harayda set a tough task for herself—to write a modern comedy of manners (the sort at which the late Laurie Colwin excelled)—and ended up, unfortunately, with a mannered comedy with tired observations about psychiatrists, child-rearing, wedding rituals and Martha Stewart".
