= Single & Single =

1999 novel by John le Carré

- First edition (UK)
- Author: John le Carré
- Language: English
- Genre: Crime fiction, mystery
- Publisher: Hodder & Stoughton (UK); Scribner (US)
- Publication date: 1999
- Media type: Print (hardback and paperback)
- Pages: 352
- ISBN: 0-340-73897-9
- OCLC: 44694435

Single & Single is a novel by British writer John le Carré about a British Customs and Excise officer named Brock on the trail of elusive fraudster Tiger Single. Helped by Tiger's son Oliver, Brock unravels the mystery of an international money-laundering operation.

== Plot ==
Like many of Le Carré's novels, the narrative begins in the in medias res style, midway through the events which have precipitated the opening scene.

=== Present day ===
In southern Turkey, a corporate lawyer with the London finance house Single & Single, Alfred Winser, is executed in cold blood by Alix Hoban, his firm's leading client, for reasons he cannot comprehend.

In Devon, England, Oliver Hawthorne is a down-at-heel children's magician lodging in a small hotel owned by Elsie and her son Sammy. After finishing his latest performance, he receives an urgent call from his banker, Arthur Toogood, who accompanies him to a bank audit, where he learns an anonymous benefactor has deposited £5,000,030 into a trust Oliver created for his infant daughter, Carmen. Oliver claims ignorance but later tells Elsie he must travel to London for a few days.

=== 1990s ===
The narrative shifts to the early 1990s, when Oliver - in reality Oliver Single - joins his father "Tiger" Single's firm just after graduating from law school. After the warming of relations with the Soviet Union, several Western businesses are eager to explore business opportunities in the "new" Russia, and Tiger has secured a meeting with two Russian brothers, the Orlovs, renowned as Moscow's "premier power brokers." Yevgeny Orlov and his right-hand man, Alix Hoban, discuss ventures with Tiger to restructure and exploit Soviet resources in scrap iron, oil, and - most lucrative of all - surplus disaster relief blood.

Though he has some misgivings, Oliver is enough in awe of his father to throw himself into facilitating the various deals, including traveling to Moscow, where he meets Yevgeny's daughter Zoya, whom Hoban is married to. Hoban has no regard for his wife, and she and Oliver soon become lovers.

All of Single & Single's plans collapse with the Soviet coup attempt of 1991: overnight, the Soviet Union collapses, and the Orlovs' power and vaunted connections are reduced to nothing. Tiger is undeterred, and sends Oliver out on various business errands that increase his misgivings. Before long, Single & Single and the Orlovs appear to be prosperous again. After receiving cryptic hints from Zoya, Oliver raids his father's safe during the office Christmas party, and a look through his records is enough to confirm Oliver's worst fears: the Orlovs have rebuilt their power structure as an organized crime syndicate, and his father's finance house is a money laundering service.

In turmoil, Oliver informs on his father to Nathaniel Brock, a senior officer of British Customs and Excise, and then disappears. Now, years later, the deposit into his daughter's trust makes Oliver realize that his father is on to him. Tiger once made a promise to deposit £5,000,000 into a trust as soon as Oliver gave him a grandchild; the extra £30 signifies the thirty pieces of silver given to Judas Iscariot.

=== Present day ===
Oliver meets with Brock, who informs him that the Orlovs had Winser killed after a series of "business" setbacks, the last occurring a few weeks ago when the Russian Coast Guard boarded the freighter Free Tallinn in the Baltic Sea. Tiger has disappeared, and Brock needs Oliver's help to track him down.

Brock's obsession is corrupt British officials who aid international crime, and his "personal anti-Christ" is Superintendent Bernard Porlock, a "brazenly corrupt" police officer who controls a vast network of similarly corrupt officials all over the United Kingdom, and a long-time cohort of Tiger's. Brock tells Oliver that he is prepared to offer Tiger full immunity from prosecution in exchange for enough information to bring down Porlock and his network. Oliver, who still has feelings of guilt for betraying his father, agrees to help save him.

Oliver tracks Tiger's movements from Single's business office to his stepmother's country home and on to Tiger's mistress's apartment in London, where he finds the envelope Tiger received just before he fled the country: inside is a letter from the Orlovs' company, politely requesting repayment of £200 million for business losses, and the videotape of Winser's execution. Meanwhile, Brock has a secret source of information that Oliver doesn't know about: Randy Massingham, Tiger's former chief of staff, who has sought refuge with Brock and is demanding a guarantee of immunity before he will divulge what he knows about Tiger's activities. Brock refuses to give him this guarantee until Massingham shares pertinent information.

Tiger's trail takes Oliver to a Swiss bank in Bern, and then to Istanbul, where a Polish lawyer who had dealings with Tiger and the Orlovs, Dr. Mirsky, is living in a heavily guarded villa with his family. To Oliver, Mirsky lets slip the explosive secret that he assumed Oliver already knew: Yevgeny Orlov's younger brother, Mikhail, was aboard the Free Tallinn when it was boarded, and was shot and killed by the Russian Coast Guard. Now Yevgeny Orlov has "declared war on the whole f***ing human race."

Oliver communicates with Brock who, armed with this knowledge, confronts Massingham. Massingham confesses that he, Hoban, and Mirsky conspired with each other to take control of the crime syndicate away from Tiger and the Orlovs, only Hoban double-crossed them, and with Mikhail's death, their "paper putsch" turned into a "five-star... blood feud," and Massingham and Mirsky had to run for their lives. Massingham also confesses that Superintendent Porlock was Tiger's accomplice in all his corrupt dealings, but Brock is painfully aware that he cannot bring Porlock down without Tiger's personal testimony.

Still following Tiger's trail, Oliver and his handler, Aggie, give Brock the slip and find a fragile Zoya staying in their old house in the Turkish countryside. Oliver coaxes from her the fact that Hoban took her, their son, and Mikhail to a football game, and that was where Hoban convinced Mikhail to accompany the Free Tallinn voyage.

Oliver grabs a motorcycle and leaves Aggie behind, riding to Ankara airport, and ultimately travelling on to the Orlovs' sanctum in "Bethlehem," where he finds his father, beaten but alive, and Yevgeny, emotionally shattered but still wanting revenge on the man responsible for his brother's death. Despite Hoban's urging, Yevgeny is still not entirely convinced that Tiger should be killed.

Oliver gives the most important performance of his life, trying to rebuild Yevgeny's spirits and convince him that Tiger is innocent. His performance is constantly undermined by Tiger's clumsy attempts to intervene in the conversation, which tip Yevgeny's trust back towards Hoban. Even as he is trying to save Tiger's life, Oliver has a sudden epiphany: that his father is neither a genius businessman nor a master criminal, but simply a pathetic con man; a hustler who has finally been stripped of his glamour and has nothing left.

Oliver introduces his final "trick", sharing the details of his conversation with Zoya and Hoban's role in Mikhail's death. Hearing this, Yevgeny turns on Hoban and Yevgeny's wife, Tinatin, picks up a handgun and shoots Hoban between the eyes. At almost the same moment, the house is stormed by a joint British-Russian commando team, led by Brock, who takes Tiger into custody. Oliver is mistaken for an enemy by a Russian commando, who pins Oliver to the floor, and is himself shortly flattened by a groin kick from Aggie, who helps Oliver to his feet.

== Themes ==
Oliver Single is a complex character, disaffected and clumsy, a giant of a man, who has tried for years to lose his identity. He gave up a glittering lifestyle and career for his principles. However, he cannot abandon his father and risks everything to save him, even though, in a moment of pure clarity, he sees his father for the empty and amoral scoundrel he really is.

The story reads like many of le Carré's earlier spy novels, and much spycraft is applied in the hunt for Tiger Single. Now that the wall is down, the enemy is not so clearly defined. In his search for his father, he realises that his betrayal was not the only one.

The book was re-published in 2001 with a new foreword by the author, in which he admitted that the evolution of Oliver's feelings towards his father mirrored Le Carré's feelings towards his own father. Le Carré's father, Ronald Cornwell, was imprisoned at least once for insurance fraud, was associated with the Kray twins, and, according to one biographer of Le Carré, "made and lost his fortune a number of times due to elaborate confidence tricks and schemes which landed him in prison on at least one occasion." Rick Pym, the father of the titular character in Le Carré's earlier novel A Perfect Spy, was based in part on Ronald Cornwell. In his foreword to the re-publication of Single & Single, Le Carré wrote:

"What if my father, instead of being rumbled by the forces of the law - which sadly for him was regularly the case - what if, like so many of the bent businessmen around him, he had got away with his scams scot free, and become, as he had always dreamed of becoming, a respected fat-cat of the West End, owner of an instant ancient pile in Buckinghamshire, president of the local football club, cricket club, giver of garden fetes for the renewal of the church roof?
...
But if I look back on my novel today, that bit of history forms only the backdrop to the story of how a father-obsessed son finally sprang over his own shadow, and discovered that the monster who ruled his life was just another sad and empty little man."

== Reception ==
The Globe and Mail called Single and Single one of le Carré's "more underrated novels", and praises his depiction of "the collapse of Russia into gangster capitalism" and how it "was forcing a rethink of intelligence work throughout the Western world".
