= Dragonfly (Durbin novel) =

1999 novel by Frederic S. Durbin

- Dust-jacket illustration by Jason Van Hollander for Dragonfly
- Author: Frederic S. Durbin
- Illustrator: Jason Van Hollander
- Cover artist: Jason Van Hollander
- Language: English
- Genre: Fantasy novel, horror novel
- Publisher: Arkham House
- Publication date: 1999
- Publication place: United States
- Media type: Print (hardback)
- Pages: viii, 300 pp
- ISBN: 0-87054-175-7
- OCLC: 41211479
- Dewey Decimal: 813/.54 21
- LC Class: PS3554.U6695 D7 1999

Dragonfly is a fantasy, horror novel by author Frederic S. Durbin. It was released in 1999 by Arkham House in an edition of 4,000 copies. It was the author's first novel.

== Plot summary ==
Ten-year-old Bridget Ann (nicknamed "Dragonfly") lives in her Uncle Henry's funeral parlor. Uncle Henry summons Mothkin, a hunter, to investigate strange things happening in the basement as Hallowe'en approaches. In the basement, Dragonfly and Mothkin discover a doorway to a spooky underground world, known as Harvest Moon, which is ruled by an evil despot, Samuel Hain. Dragonfly is separated from Mothkin and meets up with a werewolf named Sylva who protects her from Hain. Eventually, she reunites with Mothkin for a final battle with Hain.

== Reprints ==
- Mechanicsburg, PA: Science Fiction Book Club, 2001
- New York: Ace Books, 2005
