= Journeys with Elijah =

1999 children's picture book

Journeys with Elijah: Eight Tales of the Prophet
- Author: Barbara Diamond Goldin
- Illustrator: Jerry Pinkney
- Language: English
- Genre: Children's literature, picture book
- Published: 1999 (Dial Press)
- Publication place: United States
- Media type: Print (hardback)
- Pages: 77
- ISBN: 9780152004453
- OCLC: 34958615

Journeys with Elijah: Eight Tales of the Prophet is a 1999 children's picture book by Barbara Diamond Goldin and illustrated by Jerry Pinkney. It is based on the tradition that the biblical prophet Elijah can reappear to anyone anywhere at any time and is eight stories of people's encounters with him from ancient times to the modern day throughout the world.

== Reception ==
School Library Journal, in a review of Journeys with Elijah, wrote "Goldins writing is smooth and her metaphors are clear. Pinkneys vivid watercolor illustrations bring the tales to life." and concluded "Journeys with Elijah makes a fine addition to folklore collections." The Horn Book Magazine called it an "eloquent collection."

Publishers Weekly gave a starred review and wrote "Goldin imbues her well-paced tales with an irresistible sense of mystery and wonder. .. Pinkney's masterfully composed watercolor-pastel-and-pencil paintings have rarely looked better." The New York Times wrote "Children who are entertained and educated by these stories can be introduced to the more complicated details when they are older and ready to ponder why the same prophet who heard the still, small voice of God also found it necessary to slaughter the defeated disciples of His rivals."

Journeys with Elijah has also been reviewed by Booklist, Kirkus Reviews, and The ALAN Review.

== Awards ==
- 1999 Sydney Taylor Book Award for Older Readers - Honor
- 2000 ALA Notable Children's Book - Older Readers
- 2000 Notable Social Studies Trade Books For Young People - Folktales, Myths and Legends
