= Ancient Wisdom, Modern World =

System of ethics

- Author: 14th Dalai Lama
- Language: English
- Publisher: Little, Brown/Abacus Press
- Publication date: 1999
- Media type: Print
- ISBN: 0-349-11443-9

Ancient Wisdom, Modern World: Ethics for the new Millennium is a book of philosophical thought written by the Dalai Lama Tenzin Gyatso and published by Little, Brown/Abacus Press in 1999. (ISBN 0-349-11443-9). It proposes a system of ethics based on universal principles as opposed to strictly religious ones and whose goal is happiness for all individuals regardless of their religious beliefs.
