= Bonnie Burnard =

Canadian writer

- Born: Bonita Amelia Huctwith; January 15, 1945; Petrolia, Ontario, Canada
- Died: March 4, 2017 (aged 72); London, Ontario, Canada
- Education: University of Western Ontario
- Occupations: Novelist & Short story writer
- Writing career
- Language: English
- Notable work: A Good House
- Notable awards: Commonwealth Writers' Prize (1989); Marian Engel Award (1995); Scotiabank Giller Prize (1999)

Bonnie Burnard (January 15, 1945 – March 4, 2017) was a Canadian short story writer and novelist, best known for her 1999 novel, A Good House, which won the Scotiabank Giller Prize.

Born in Petrolia, Ontario, she grew up in Forest, Ontario, and moved to Regina, Saskatchewan, in the late 1970s. In the early 1990s she returned to Southwestern Ontario, and was a resident of London, Ontario, where she died on March 4, 2017.

== Personal life ==
Born Bonita Amelia Huctwith on January 15, 1945, in Petrolia, Ontario, she grew up with her four brothers in Forest, Ontario. She was the youngest in her family. Her mother's family bred Clydesdale horses which they showcased at the annual Royal Agricultural Winter Fair in Toronto. Her father, Charles, was raised by his relatives after his parents died when he was a child. The couple sold eggs at the Toronto market and later shipped tens of thousands of cases from Ottawa to England. After World War II, the couple continued to sell eggs to Toronto and Montreal. In 1967, Burnard completed her Bachelor of Arts degree in English from the University of Western Ontario.

Burnard married Ronald Burnard, an executive at London Life Insurance in 1973 and spent more than a decade in Regina, Saskatchewan, where she raised her three children; Alexandra (known as D'Arcy) (b. Sept. 1975), Melanie (b. Feb. 1978), and David (b. Mar. 1979). She worked as a literary officer at the Saskatchewan Arts Board from 1988 to 1990. She moved back to Southwestern Ontario in 1992, living briefly in Strathroy-Caradoc and later moving to London, Ontario; her marriage had ended a few years earlier. She served as a Writer in Residence at the University of Western Ontario and was a guest lecturer at writing and literary conferences across Canada and around the world (e.g., England, Germany, Sweden, and South Africa).

She taught at the Humber School for Writers, the University of British Columbia's summer creative writing program Booming Ground, and at the University of Windsor as an adjunct professor in the writing department. Burnard worked briefly for a lawyer, the Writers' Trust of Canada, served on the Public Lending Right Commission, as a board member at Coteau Books and the Saskatchewan Writers Guild.

Burnard died on March 4, 2017, at the age of 72. She is survived by three children and four grandchildren.

== Literary work ==
While attending classes at the University of Regina, Burnard attended one of the reading sessions by another Canadian novelist, Marian Engel, which inspired her to write. Engel had visited Regina to read from her the Governor-General's Literary Award-winning novel, Bear. Canadian poet and novelist Ken Mitchell suggested she attend the Saskatchewan Summer School of the Arts. Her first published work was a short story published simultaneously in Saskatchewan Gold and the NeWest Review. In 1983, Oberon Press published her short stories in Coming Attractions. Stories By Sharon Butala, Bonnie Burnard & Sharon Sparling. She edited the 1986 book The Old Dance: Love Stories of One Kind or Another published by Thunder Creek Publishing Co-operative. In 1988, her first individually authored short story collection Women of Influence was published. The collection was later translated into French as Femmes d'Influence by S. Brault in 1995. Her second short story collection Casino & Other Stories was published in 1994 and won several awards. In 1995, she edited another book Stag Line: Stories by Men.

Her short stories were included in many anthologies, among these: Best Canadian Stories (1984, 1989, 1992), Saskatchewan Gold (1982), Double Bond (1984), More Saskatchewan Gold (1984), Sky High (1988), Last Map (1989), Soho Square 111: Bloomsbury (1990), Canadian Short Stories (1991), Worlds Unrealized (1991), Beyond Borders (1992), Kitchen Talk (1992), Lodestone (1993), The Second Gates of Paradise: Anthology of Erotic Short Fiction (1994), Writing from Canada (1994), Spin on 2 (1995), The Oxford Book of Canadian Short Stories (1995), Arnold Anthology of Post-Colonial Literature (1996), Desde El Invierno (1996), The Best of NeWest (1996), Mothers and Daughters (1997), Penguin Anthology of Stories by Canadian Women (1997), Sunrise to Sunset (1997), Desire (1999) Oxford Stories by Canadian Women (1999), Turn of the Story (1999) Dropped Threads (2001), Donde Es Aqui? (2002), Notes from Home (2002), and Short Fiction by Oxford University (2003).

Burnard's first novel A Good House was published in 1999. The novel received wide acclaim and was an international success. It was a #1 bestseller in Canada. Four editions of the novel were published in Canada, the United States, the United Kingdom, Germany, and in twelve other countries from 1999 to 2002. Her second novel Suddenly was published after ten years in 2009.

== Awards ==
Burnard won several awards for her literary work. Her first individual short story collection Women of Influence received the Commonwealth Best First Book Award in 1989. Her second short story collection Casino & Other Stories won "Book of the Year" at the Saskatchewan Book Awards and was shortlisted for "Regina Book Award", both in 1994. Also that same year, this collection received the Periodical Publishers Award and was shortlisted for the Scotiabank Giller Prize. In 1995, Burnard was awarded the Marian Engel Award given to the body of work by a female Canadian writer. In 1999, she won the Scotiabank Giller Prize for her novel, A Good House. In 2000, A Good House fetched her the Canadian Booksellers Association People's Choice Award.

Burnard has also received the W. O. Mitchell Bursury at fort San in 1983, the City of Regina Writing Award in 1984, the CBC Literary Competition Award in 1992, and various Saskatchewan Writers Guild awards.

== Bibliography ==
Burnard published the following works under her name:

Novels

- A Good House (1999), ISBN 0-00-225526-X published by HarperFlamingoCanada
- Suddenly (2009), ISBN 0-00-648524-3

Short stories

- Coming Attractions. Stories By Sharon Butala, Bonnie Burnard & Sharon Sparling (1983) ISBN 9780887504976 published by Oberon Press
- Women of Influence (1988), ISBN 0-919926-81-9 published by Coteau Books
- Casino & Other Stories (1994), ISBN 0-00-224255-9 published by HarperCollins

Other (As an editor)

- The Old Dance: Love Stories of One Kind or Another (1986) ISBN 978-0919926561 published by Thunder Creek Publishing Co-operative
- Stag Line: Stories by Men (1995) ISBN 978-1550500615 published by Coteau Books
