= Tokio ya no nos quiere =

1999 novel by Ray Loriga

Tokio ya no nos quiere (English: Tokyo Doesn't Love Us Anymore) is a novel published in 1999 by Spanish author Ray Loriga. It was published in English in 2003 by Canongate, in a translation by John King.

== Plot summary ==
It is a first-person account of a travelling drug salesman. He goes to different places around the world, peddling a memory erasing drug. Various minor characters act as outlets for the authors musings on memory. Told through a mental haze of pretty much every drug ever invented and smattered with promiscuous sexual encounters of all varieties, the protagonist eventually begins sampling his own product. Pages of deja vu and disjointed thought lead him to meet with the inventor of the drug in Arizona. The author is an epileptic and took his seizures and temporary memory loss as part of his inspiration for the book. The memory loss also gives him an interesting transitional device for forwarding the plot without having to get caught up in details he wishes to omit.

== Major themes ==
The author was trying to provoke the question to the reader, "What does it mean to be human?". There are definitely religious ideas here, Loriga was raised Catholic. Memory is linked to sin, both original and individual. Almost reminiscent of Dr. Heidegger's Experiment by Nathaniel Hawthorne, each character is to some extent doomed to make the same mistakes they did before. Therefore, one could draw the conclusion that our sins are a part of us, inseparable and thus uncontrollable.

The novel can be described as very European because it reflects the pain of the Second World War and its extension into the future. The author once said in an interview that, "...we Europeans are so divided amongst ourselves, but we have so much in common -- a common history and a heavy past that we carry, and at some point you feel we look back more than we look forwards. Whereas in America it's the other way around. It doesn't mean whatever they're saying or whatever they're seeing is better than what we're doing. It's not a good thing in itself. But it's true: Americans are more like little kids in a way, they predict themselves in the future. We're the old people now."

This is clearly shown towards the end of the book when the inventor, K.L. Krumper, talks about being injured and in a hospital, watching reconstruction work and thinking. "Now seeing absolutely clearly the feeling of peace sweeping through those labourers as they finished their job, I decided to place all my faith in the demolition of the past...You have to remember that in those days I was just one more of the millions of soldiers surviving from a vanquished army. Belonging to a dead Germany, defeated by shame...We came back to Germany in the slow trains defeated, like strangers ejected from paradise by strangers. The destruction of the past then seemed to me to be the only possible hope."

At the same time then, the book jumps to the opposite position and reflects a Nietzschean concept found throughout the writings of modern authors like Chuck Palahniuk. The idea being that you have to break societies (or people) down before they can become something better.
