= Ray Loriga =

Spanish author, screenwriter, and director

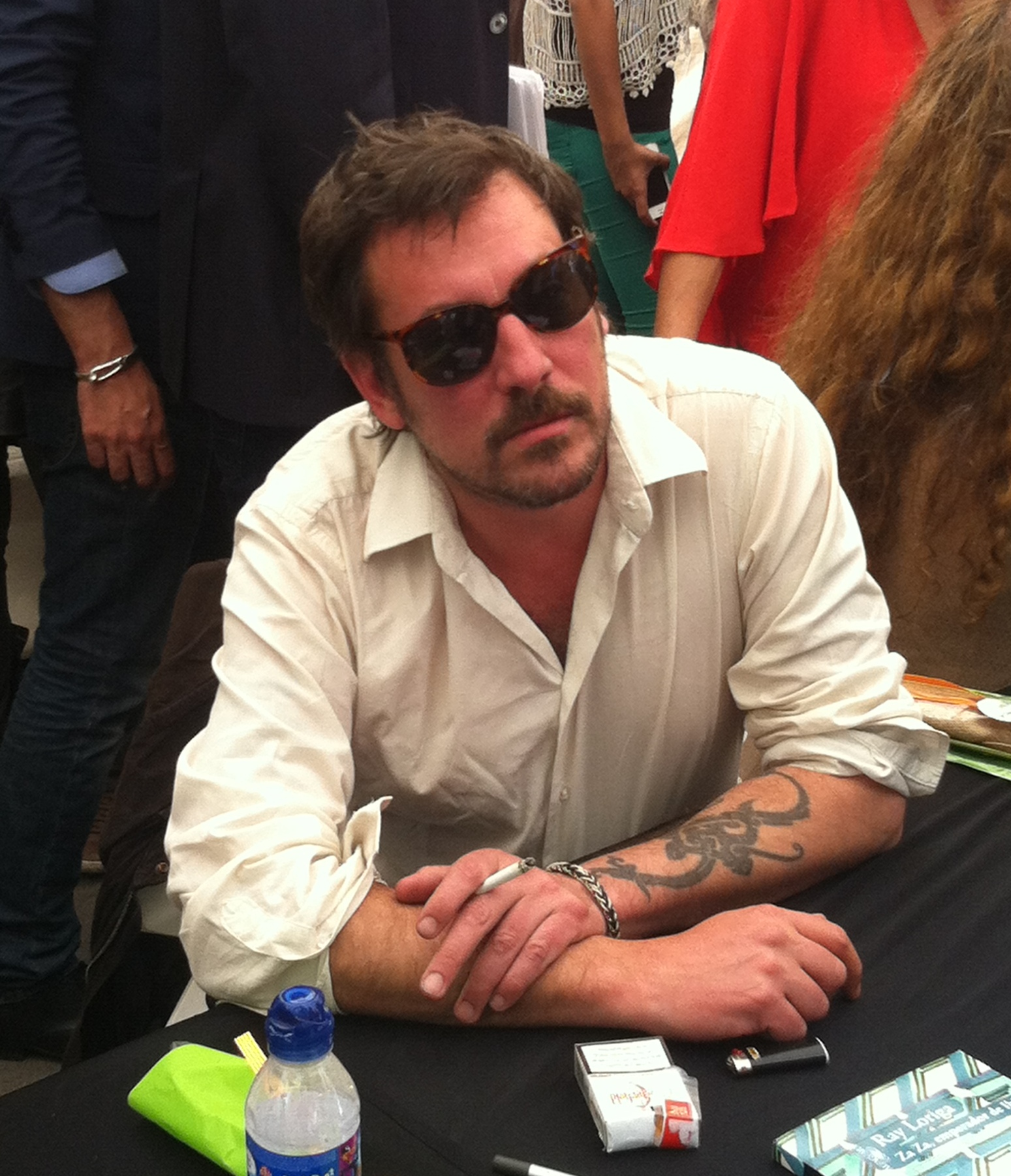
- Ray Loriga in Barcelona, 2014
- Born: Jorge Loriga Torrenova; March 5, 1967 (age 59); Madrid, Spain
- Occupations: Writer, film director
- Spouse: Christina Rosenvinge (div. 2006)
- Children: 2
- Writing career
- Pen name: Ray Loriga
- Period: 1990s–present
- Notable awards: Alfaguara Novel Prize
- Literary movement: X Generation

Jorge Loriga Torrenova (born March 5, 1967), better known as Ray Loriga, is a Spanish author, screenwriter, and director.

== Writing career ==
His first novel Lo Peor de todo (The Worst Thing of All), was published in 1992, and was followed by Héroes in 1993. Caídos del Cielo - La pistola de mi hermano (My Brother's Gun) was the first of his novels to be published in English, and he directed a film based on this book in 1997. In the same year, he worked together with Pedro Almodóvar and Jorge Guerricaechevarria to produce the screenplay for the film Carne trémula (Live Flesh), also directed by Almodóvar. The screenplay was based on the 1986 novel of the same name by the British crime writer Ruth Rendell. His second novel to be published in English was Tokio ya no nos quiere (Tokyo Doesn't Love Us Anymore).

== Personal life ==
Loriga married Spanish-Danish singer-songwriter Christina Rosenvinge in 1989.

== Award ==
In April 2017, Loriga was awarded the Alfaguara Prize for his novel Rendición (Surrender). It is one of the most financially rewarding Spanish-language literary prizes. His most recent novel, Sábado, domingo (Saturday, Sunday), was published in February 2019.

== Bibliography ==
=== Novels ===
- Lo peor de todo (The Worst Thing of All) (1992)
- Héroes (Heroes) (1993)
- Caídos del Cielo - La pistola de mi hermano (My Brother's Gun) (1995, English publication in 1998)
- Tokio ya no nos quiere (Tokyo Doesn't Love Us Anymore) (1999, English publication in 2003)
- Trífero (2000)
- El hombre que inventó Manhattan (The Man Who Invented Manhattan) (2004)
- Yo solo hablo de amor (I Only Speak of Love) (2008)
- Za Za, emperador de Ibiza (Za Za, the Emperor of Ibiza) (2014)
- Rendición (Surrender) (2017 - Alfaguara prize - English publication scheduled 2020)
- Sábado, domingo (Saturday, Sunday) (2018)

=== Short story collections ===
- Días extraños (Strange Days) (1994)
- Días aún más extraños (Even Stranger Days) (2007)
- Los oficiales (The Officers) (2009)
- El destino de Cordelia (Cordelia's Destiny) (2009)

== Filmography ==
Year	Film	Director	Writer
1997	Carne trémula (Live Flesh)	No	Yes
1997	La pistola de mi hermano (My Brother's Gun)	Yes	Yes
2004	El 7º día (The 7th Day)	No	Yes
2005	Ausentes	No	Yes
2007	Teresa, el cuerpo de Cristo	Yes	Yes
