= François Bloemhof =

South African author

- Born: September 15, 1962 (age 64); Paarl, South Africa
- Occupations: Author, Playwright, Composer, Copywriter, Film reviewer
- Writing career
- Pen name: Leo Bekker
- Website: www.francoisbloemhof.net

François Bloemhof (born 15 September 1962), is a South African author, playwright, composer, copywriter, and film reviewer. He writes mostly in Afrikaans and has won a number of prizes for his work.

== Biography ==
Bloemhof was born in the town of Paarl in the Cape Province, South Africa. In 1991, he won the De Kat Prize for Die Nag Het Net Een Oog, a Gothic novel set in a small rural community. The work is a thriller with supernatural and more conventional dramatic elements. Koue soen, was a finalist in the 1994 Sanlam/De Kat/Kuns op Een novel competition and was shortlisted for the M-Net prize. He has received four ATKV children's book awards and the Sanlam Prize for Youth Literature, and was a finalist in the 2007 MML literature awards. More than 300 of his short stories, mostly written under pseudonyms, have appeared in magazines. He lives in Durbanville and is a part-time copywriter, translator, and editor.

== Selected bibliography ==
=== Adult fiction ===
- Die Nag Het Net Een Oog (1991)
- Die Duiwel se Tuin (1993)
- Koue Soen (1994)
- Bloedbroer (1995)
- Storieboek (1996)
- Mooidraai Basuin (1997)
- Nagbesoeker (1997)
- Hostis (1998)
- Klipgooi (1999)
- ’n Tweede Asem vir Jan A (2001)
- Spinnerak (Alma van der Pool #1) (2006)
- Jagseisoen (Alma van der Pool #2) (2007)
- Rooi Luiperd (Mark Steyn #1) (2008)
- Harde Woorde (Alma van der Pool #3) (2009)
- Afspraak in Venesië (Mark Steyn #2) (2009)
- Die Onbekendes (2010)
- Die Genesis-faktor (Mark Steyn #3) (2010)
- Helse Manier van Koebaai Sê (Mark Steyn #4) (2011)
- Jy-weet-wie (2012)
- Moord in die Beloofde Land (2013)
- Pad Na Jou Hart (2013)
- Die Vierde Stem (2014)
- Vir Altyd (2014)
- Vir die Voëls (2016)
- Double Echo (Doodskoot) (2016)
- Feeding Time (Dieretuin) (2017)
- Vergeet My Nie (2020)
- Die duisend en eerste nag (2021)

=== Fiction For Teenagers And Younger Readers ===
- Sakkie en die Toffiewolf (1994)
- Die Dom Towenaar (1994)
- Middernagland (1996)
- Die Vrou met die Pers Oog* (1996)
- Donderwoud* (1996)
- Die Waterding* (1997)
- Slinger-slinger (1997)
- K-TV Holiday Fun (fun and activity book) (1997)
- Kamer 13* (1998)
- Die Wit Huis (1998)
- Die Speletjie* (1999)
- Kry vir jou, Ou Langklou* (2000)
- Die Dae Toe Ek Elvis Was (2002)
- Hospitaaltyd* (2002)
- Agent Snoet en die Botterdiamant (2002)
- A Day to Celebrate (’n Dag om te Vier!) (2003)
- Who Wants to be What? (Wie Wil Wat Wees?) (2003)
- Spiders in the House (Spinnekoppe in die Huis) (2003)
- Great Ideas (Blink Gedagtes) (with Johan van Lill) (2003)
- Vampiere in Londen* (2004)
- Nie Vir Kinders Nie (2005)
- Agent Snoet en die Kattekwaad (2005)
- City at the End of the World (Stad aan die Einde van die Wêreld) (2007)
- Moenie dat die Grootmense Hoor Nie (2009)
- Agent Snoet en die Hondelewe (2008)
- Flipom (2009)
- Agent Snoet en die Groen Genugtig (2010)
- 13 Spookstories (2010)
- Die Land Verby Donker (2012)
- Vreeslike Versies (Afrikaans translation of Roald Dahl's Revolting Rhymes) (2012)
- Nog 13 Spookstories (2012)
- Koue Rillings (2013)
- Liefde, Moord en Facebook (2015)
- Agent Snoet en die Windlawaai (2016)
- Agent Snoet 5-in-1 Omnibus (2019)

Asterix indicates titles in the Rillers series (Afrikaans implementation of the Chillers series, only Afrikaans titles are given).
