= Skattejakten (novel) =

1999 novel by Margit Sandemo

- Author: Margit Sandemo
- Language: Norwegian
- Genre: Mystery novel
- Publisher: Bladkompaniet AS
- Publication date: 1999
- Media type: Print (hardback)
- Pages: 124
- ISBN: 82-509-4205-1
- OCLC: 185761447

Skattejakten (in English The Treasure Hunt. This novel has been translated into English) is a Norwegian novel containing clues to a real-world treasure hunt. It is written by the author Margit Sandemo. The novel is only 124 pages long, and is possibly the shortest book the author has written. Skattejakten has not been reprinted after it was first published in 1999.

Below is an English translation of the Norwegian cover text:

Oslo, 1958. Mattis is a poor student from Lofoten. Then he meets Flora, daughter of the manager Flaten, and he falls in love with her. The manager promises that he will get Flora, if he can find the gold treasure from the days of the Second World War. Mattis didn't suspect that he was being used. But during his mission he runs into Ina, and is thrown into an incredible hunt for both treasure and love. Hidden mysteries in the novel contain the answer to the hiding place of a real treasure. This novel contains all you need to find it.

Come along to the exciting treasure hunt by Margit Sandemo. You may even find a gold treasure worth 250,000 kroner!

The book was written as a set of riddles that would lead the treasure hunters to the treasure hidden by Bladkompaniet AS, the publisher of the novel. Competitors searched for the treasure, which had been hidden somewhere in Norway. In the "treasure", a telephone number was hidden, which the lucky winner called to claim the prize. The treasure was found 11 October 1999. Margit Sandemo said in a TV-interview that even she hadn't known where the treasure had been hidden.
