= David Macfarlane =

Canadian journalist, playwright and novelist

David Macfarlane (born 1952 in Hamilton, Ontario) is a Canadian journalist, playwright and novelist.

His debut novel, 1999's Summer Gone, was shortlisted for the Giller Prize and was a winner of the Books in Canada First Novel Award.

His Newfoundland family memoir, The Danger Tree, (published as Come From Away in the United States) published in 1991, was met with international acclaim.

His most novel The Figures of Beauty, published in 2013, won the Bressani Literary Prize. It was described by The Wall Street Journal as "a moving tale of love, fate, and regret."

David Macfarlane's magazine and newspaper writing has earned him a National Newspaper Award and numerous National Magazine Awards.

His play, "Fishwrap," premiered at the Tarragon Theatre in Toronto.

His musical portrait of the city in which he lives, "The Toronto Suite," was performed by the Via Salzburg Ensemble at the Glenn Gould Theatre.

In collaboration with musician Douglas Cameron, Macfarlane has co-created "The Door You Came In" – a two-man performance of music and text based on the stories of The Danger Tree.

Macfarlane was employed as an arts columnist for The Globe and Mail until 2003.

== Works ==
- The Danger Tree (1991)
- Summer Gone (1999)
  - in German, transl. Almuth Carstens: Der verlorene Sommer. Goldmann, Munich 2002
- The Figures of Beauty (2013)
- Fishwrap (2005)
