= Legenden om Ljusets rike =

Book series by Margit Sandemo

Legenden om Ljusets rike (Norwegian: Sagnet om Lysets rike, English: The Legend of the Realm of Light; this novel has not been translated into English) is a set of fantasy novels by Norwegian-Swedish writer Margit Sandemo. It includes twenty titles. This set of novels can be read in Norwegian, Swedish, Icelandic and Polish. Margit Sandemo says that she wrote this series of novels because she wanted, like many other fiction writers, to portray her own view about an idealized world. Another reason to write Legenden om Ljusets rike was for the character called Marco who Sandemo created in the end of The Legend of the Ice People. She was so fond of him that she wanted to write more about Marco in the following series of novels. Those ideas took shape in her mind when she had written around half of Häxmästaren.

The motto of Legenden om Ljusets rike is (says on first page of the first volume):

Don't believe everything you read!
But let your imagination believe it!
It lives its own life, parallel to your worldly life. Imagination can open up new worlds for you.

== The Milieu ==
Legenden om Ljusets rike is a follow-up to two previous set of novels written by Margit Sandemo: Directly to the Häxmästaren and indirectly to The Legend of the Ice People, and it is the conclusion-volume of the set of novels-trilogy that consist of these novels. Some of the characters of the Legenden om Ljusets rike are the same as in the novels Häxmästaren and Sagan om Isfolket; some of them are completely new. Mainly, new characters are children of the principal characters of the two above-mentioned novels.

Legenden om Ljusets rike describes life in the fictional Realm of Light, where there are no disorders, wars, environmental problems, criminality, inequality, old age or death. The Realm of Light is located next to the center of the Earth and is accessed through numerous hidden Gates on Earth. Once someone travels to the Realm of Light, they cannot return to Earth. In the Realm of Light, time passes 12 times slower than on Earth.

People in the Realm of Light live very long lifetime, but their ageing comes to a stop at the age of 30-35. They, who have been older when entering the Realm of Light, get younger slowly to that age. The area of Realm of Light is 100 000 square kilometers, approximately the size of Iceland. So that Realm of Light wouldn't change for too much dense populated, there is imposed restrictions on number of children. Because of that each family can have just one child.

The author has populated this fantasy world with people, the Spirits of the warlock Móri, ancestors of the Icepeople, the deads who were discontent with their lives, fairies, Earth-beings who are hostile to other creatures, Strangers, several members of the Lemurian race as well as 4 Madrags; the technologically advanced inhabitants of Mu. There are no winds, changes of states of weather or the blue sky in the Realm of Light, because the sun can't shine there. The technology of the Realm of Light is very progressive for the sake of high education of the Strangers. The cars there been replaced with flying motor vehicles (air gondolas).

The sun doesn't shine in the Realm of Light, but there are many goldish balls, the Holy Suns on top of high towers called minarets that shining light coloured amber. The largest Holy Sun, "The Big Sun" is situated in the capital of the land. The opposite of Realm of Light is the Realm of Darkness. Realm of Light has been isolated from Realm of Darkness with the transparent, immaterial, kind of glass Wall.

== Main characters ==
Jori has brown, curly uncut hair. He shares his father’s eyes and his mother’s irresponsibility. Because he is not as tall and handsome as his friends, he compensates by being foolish, wild and bold.

Jaskari is the strong man of the group with long, light hair and blinding blue eyes. He has muscles that show prominently through his shirt and trousers.

Armas is half Stranger. Tall, intelligent, with piercing eyes and soft hair. He has peculiar talents and had a stricter upbringing than the other youths.

Elena is insecure, peaceful and pleasant. She has large, frizzy hair.

Berengaria is four years younger than the above characters. She is slender with long, dark, curly hair. Berengaria is clever with a happy disposition. She is giggly, impulsive, and nosy. Her parents worry about her.

Nighteye is an American Indian boy with long, straight and blue-black hair, noble profile and eyes which are as dark as night. He is one year older than the above characters.

Tsi-Tsungga, also called Tsi, is an Earth-being from The Old Castle. Tsi is a handsome fairy resembling a young man with strong shoulders and a green-brown-plotted body.

Siska is a young runaway princess from the Realm of Darkness. She resembles Berengaria superficially. She has large, oblique, ice-grey eyes and full lips. Her hair is straight, black and shiny. She distance to young Tsi and his animal, giant squirrel Tjick.

Indra is lazy, and likes to exaggerate her laziness through jokes. Indra is also conspiratorial. She has curved eyebrows and a clear complexion. She is the same age as four first.

Miranda, two years younger than her sister, has red hair and freckles. She feels responsible for the fate of the world, and works to make it better. As an environmentalist, she has a thing about boys in her movements. She hasn't loved yet.

Alice, called Sassa, is one of the youngest, and has followed her grandparents to the Realm of Light. She was burned as a child. Marco cured all her scars, but she is still timid and doesn't want to appear to people or talk with them. Her cat is named Hubert Ambrosia.

Dolgo was formerly called Dolg. Because he has lived 250 years in the Realm of Fairies, he is still just 23 years old, but he has experience and wisdom. He hasn't experienced erotic love. His best friend is Nero the dog.

Marco is forever young, born in 1861 for Son of Lucifer, the ruler of the black/ fallen/ banished angels. He is the prince of The Black Rooms. He is also described as stately and beautiful, but is unable to fall in love.

Neither he, nor Dolgo belong to the group of young people, but they are very important to them. Marco belongs to Icepeople like Alice, Indra and Miranda.

Gondagil is a varangian from the folk of Timon in the Valley of Mist from the outside Darkness. Long, light and strong. He is now in the Realm of Light, but argues that the light can shine also for his folk. Miranda is his great love.

== Titles ==
| | Swedish title | Norwegian title | Translated title | Published | Pages | ISBN |
|---|---|---|---|---|---|---|
| 1 | Viskningen | Bak portene | The Whisper | 1995 | 252 | ISBN 91-7710-884-1 |
| 2 | Móri och Isfolket | Móri og Isfolket | Móri and the Ice People | 1995 | 253 | ISBN 91-7710-885-X |
| 3 | Flickan som inte kunde säga nej | Piken som ikke kunne si nei | The Girl Who Could not Say No | 1995 | 252 | ISBN 91-7710-944-9 |
| 4 | Dagg och dimma | Mannen fra Tåkedalen | Dew and Mist | 1996 | 255 | ISBN 91-7710-887-6 |
| 5 | Johannesnatten | Johannesnatten | Night of Johannes | 1996 | 249 | ISBN 91-7710-888-4 |
| 6 | Den utvalde | Den utvalgte | The Chosen One | 1996 | 250 | ISBN 91-7710-889-2 |
| 7 | Häxan | Heksen | The Witch | 1997 | 252 | ISBN 91-7710-948-1 |
| 8 | Skräcken | Redsel | The Horror | 1997 | 252 | ISBN 91-7710-949-X |
| 9 | Sol av Isfolket | Sol av Isfolket | Sol of the Ice People | 1997 | 248 | ISBN 91-7710-950-3 |
| 10 | Nattsvarta rosor | Nattsvarte roser | Roses Black as Night | 1997 | 250 | ISBN 91-7710-951-1 |
| 11 | Bländverk | Skrømt | Hallucination | 1998 | 252 | ISBN 91-7710-952-X |
| 12 | Det bävande hjärtat | Det bevende hjerte | The Fearful Heart | 1998 | 252 | ISBN 91-7710-953-8 |
| 13 | Ond saga | Ond saga | Evil Saga | 1998 | 251 | ISBN 91-7710-906-6 |
| 14 | In i värmen | Inn i varmen | Into the Warmth | 1998 | 250 | ISBN 91-7710-955-4 |
| 15 | Mörkrets ande | Mørket | Spirits of Darkness | 1999 | 252 | ISBN 91-7710-956-2 |
| 16 | Livshunger | Livshunger | Hunger for Life | 1999 | 252 | ISBN 91-7710-957-0 |
| 17 | Från toppen och uppåt | Fra toppen og oppover | Up from the Top | 1999 | 252 | ISBN 91-7710-935-X |
| 18 | Så djup en längtan | Så dyp en lengsel | A Longing So Deep | 1999 | 252 | ISBN 91-7710-936-8 |
| 19 | Mördande oskuld | Drepende uskyld | Wicked Innocence | 1999 | 250 | ISBN 91-7710-937-6 |
| 20 | Ett hav av kärlek | Et hav av kjærlighet | An Ocean of Love | 1999 | 248 | ISBN 91-7710-961-9 |

== Titles in other languages ==
| | Sagnet om Lysets Rike (Norwegian) | Saga o Królewstwie Światła (Polish) | Ríki ljóssins (Icelandic) |
|---|---|---|---|
| 1 | Bak portene | Wielkie Wrota | Handan hliðsins |
| 2 | Móri og Isfolket | Móri i Ludzie Lodu | Móri og Ísfólkið |
| 3 | Piken som ikke kunne si nei | Trudno mówic "nie" | Stúlkan sem gat ekki neitað |
| 4 | Mannen fra Tåkedalen | Mężczyzna z Doliny Mgieł. | Maðurinn úr þokudalnum |
| 5 | Johannesnatten | Noc Świętojańska | Jónsmessunótt |
| 6 | Den utvalgte | Chłopiec z Południa | Sá útvaldi |
| 7 | Heksen | Wiedźma | Nornin |
| 8 | Redsel | Wyprawa | Skelfing |
| 9 | Sol av Isfolket | Sol z Ludzi Lodu | Sunna af ætt Ísfólksins |
| 10 | Nattsvarte roser | Czarne róże | Náttsvartar rósir |
| 11 | Skrømt | Strachy | Umskiptingar |
| 12 | Det bevende hjerte | Drżące serce | Sál í hlekkjum |
| 13 | Ond saga | Tajemnica Gór Czarnych | Ill örlög |
| 14 | Inn i varmen | Lilja i Goram | - |
| 15 | Mørket | Ciemność | - |
| 16 | Livshunger | Głód życia | - |
| 17 | Fra toppen og oppover | Na ratunek | - |
| 18 | Så dup en lengsel | Tęsknota | - |
| 19 | Drepene uskyld | Podstęp | - |
| 20 | Et hav av kjærlighet | Morze miłości | - |
