= Visst katten har djuren själ! =

Book by Margit Sandemo

- Author: Margit Sandemo
- Cover artist: Arild Mikkelsen (photograph)
- Language: Swedish, Norwegian
- Subject: Animals
- Publisher: Boknöje AB
- Publication date: 1994
- Media type: Print (Hardback)
- Pages: 164
- ISBN: 91-7710-902-3
- OCLC: 254363585

Visst katten har djuren själ - En samling historier av och för djurvänner in Swedish and Jovisst har dyrene sjel in Norwegian (in English Sure an Animal Has a Soul - An Anthology of Tales about and for our Animal Friends; this book has not been translated into English) is a non-fictional theme book about animals written by Norwegian-Swedish author Margit Sandemo. There is a word play in the original Swedish title of book, because the word "katten," in addition to meaning "cat," is also used in the Swedish phrase which means "damn it!" As literally translated, the title of book is An Animal Has a Soul, (a Cat) Damn It!

This book was created in the same way as Vi är inte ensamma, a book about guardian angels. Sandemo asked readers of the Norwegian weekly magazine Hjemmet and the Swedish Hemmets Journal if they believed that animals have souls. She received over 1500 letters from magazine readers, without a single negative answer among them. These answers were used as the primary material of the book. Visst katten har djuren själ consists of several humorous short stories and photographs chiefly about pets, as well as wild animals. The stories quote from reader responses, and the book contains very little text by the author herself—primarily the foreword, the afterword and a few casual comments.

Margit Sandemo has always loved animals, and it stands out in her novels. She is an honorary member of the Kjemp för Dyrene, the Norwegian animal rights organization.

== Content ==
1. Some words about grasped soul - 7
2. Animals care for each other - 11
3. Personalities - 39
4. Proud, hurt or offended - 55
5. Grief - 61
6. Humour and joy of life - 75
7. Intelligence and cooperation - 97
8. Cleverness, exhibition and practical jokes - 123
9. Inexplicable - 141
10. Postscript - 163
