= Vi är inte ensamma =

1990 book by Margit Sandemo

- Author: Margit Sandemo
- Language: Swedish, Norwegian
- Subject: Guardian angels
- Genre: Non-fiction
- Publisher: Boknöje AB
- Publication date: 1990
- Media type: Pocket book
- Pages: 192
- ISBN: 91-7710-470-6
- OCLC: 186464646

Vi är inte ensamma - en samling berättelser om våra osynliga hjälpare (Swedish) is a 1990 book about the occult, written by Swedish author Margit Sandemo. The name translates to Vi er ikke alene in Norwegian and We Are Not Alone - The Anthology Stories About Our Invisible Helpers in English.

Sandemo is best known for her historical fantasy writing. The subject of this book is the guardian angels, known in the book as "helpers" or "guardian spirits". The following series of novels by Margit Sandemo, Häxmästaren is about this same subject matter. The message of the book is that everyone has, from as early as birth, at least one guardian angel, who stands by the protégé's side all their life and appears only in dangerous situations. Usually, women have male and men have female guardian spirits.

Sandemo claims to have visions. She believes that some people are born with that talent. She claims that her guardian spirit is a tall, light man called Virgil. She has known him since the age of eight. The bok explains how to tell a guardian angel from a ghost and how to contact one's own guardian angel. Sandemo claims that some people can access other people's guardian angels with metal pins, that people can send their guardian spirit a subtle request and that guardian spirits give answers via dreams, in the shape of a bird or a star.

Vi är inte ensamma is based on letters from people whose lives guardian angels have effected. Sandemo received thousands of such letters after requesting them in the Norsk Ukeblad (Norwegian Weekly Magazine).
