= Vargens lilla lamm =

2000 novel by Margit Sandemo

- Author: Margit Sandemo
- Language: Swedish, Norwegian
- Genre: Historical novel
- Publisher: Boknöje AB
- Publication date: 2000
- Media type: Print (Paperback)
- Pages: 286
- ISBN: 91-7713-021-9
- OCLC: 186475788

Vargens lilla lamm (in Swedish), "The Wolf's Little Lamb" in English, is a historical novel by Margit Sandemo the plot of which dates to the Middle Ages. It has been published in Norwegian as Barnebruden ("Child Bride") in a Spesialbøker-serie, in which novels of many writers have been published.

== Plot ==
Sir Svante has five beautiful daughters, but that is pretty much all he has. The emperor's many wars has come at great costs for his people, and Sir Svante's mansion is not much more than a shell. He decides to arrange a big party, inviting all noble bachelors they know. If some of his daughters marry rich men, he will receive sizable dowries, enabling him to restore his mansion to its previous glory. Sir Svante makes an agreement with the mysterious Strelka brothers; two of his daughters, among them the young Svanehvit, barely fourteen, is to marry the brothers and follow them to their country. The Strelka castle has an ominous rumour. There have been numerous unexplained deaths, and some say that one of the brothers killed his first wife.
