= Drömmen om en vän =

1997 novel by Margit Sandemo

- Author: Margit Sandemo
- Language: Swedish, Norwegian
- Genre: Novel
- Publisher: Boknöje AB
- Publication date: August in 1997
- Media type: Pocket book
- Pages: 144
- ISBN: 978-91-7710-941-9
- OCLC: 186466912

Drömmen om en vän in Swedish and Drømmen om en venn in Norwegian (in English The Dream about a Friend;) is a novel by Margit Sandemo. This was the first novel Margit Sandemo wrote. The novel was published in 1997, but was written as untitled in 1963. Margit Sandemo thought that it must have got lost, but found it again while she moved and cleaned up cupboards in her home.

== Plot ==
"Drömmen om en vän" is the story of Lindis, a seventeen year old girl. Lindis has always felt as an outsider in the family, and after a rude comment from a classmate, she has almost stopped eating, and her weight is plummeting. One day her mother tells Lindis that she is not their biological daughter. Lindis gets really upset, and runs off to the sea to think. She falls off a small cliff, and is trapped on a narrow brim of beach when the tide comes in. A young man, Lo, comes to her rescue and Lindis, who believes that he is a geologist, helps him collect mineral samples. He also encourages her to start eating again. The next time they meet, Lindis realises that Lo is not a human, but an extraterrestrial being. In the end Lindis travels with Lo and his superior to their planet.
