= I nattens tystnad =

1998 novel by Margit Sandemo

- Author: Margit Sandemo
- Language: Swedish, Norwegian
- Genre: Novel
- Publisher: Boknöje AB
- Publication date: 1998
- Media type: Pocket
- Pages: 218
- ISBN: 91-7710-980-5
- OCLC: 186467220

I nattens tystnad (English: In the Silence of the Night) is a novel by Margit Sandemo.
