= Den mörka sanningen =

2001 novel by Margit Sandemo

- Author: Margit Sandemo
- Cover artist: Allied Artists
- Language: Swedish, Norwegian
- Subject: The forgotten memory from childhood
- Genre: Romance, Crime and Historical novel
- Publisher: Boknöje AB
- Publication date: 2001
- Media type: Pocket book
- Pages: 156
- ISBN: 91-7713-020-0
- OCLC: 186475780

Den mörka sanningen - En berättelse om kärlek och omsorg, svek och mod (Swedish: The Dark Truth - A Story About Love and Care, Fraud and Gallantry) is a love-story and crime novel by Norwegian-Swedish author Margit Sandemo from 2001. Forerunner of this novel is a serial in a magazine published short novel called Sanningen (Swedish: The Truth). The clue and characters of Sanningen are same as in the Den mörka sanningen, it's just the extended version from that story. Den mørke sannheten is the novel's Norwegian name. In Norway Den mörka sanningen has published as part of Spesial bøker (Special Books) -series, which is assembled of novels by many writers. Norwegian translation is by Unni Wenche Tandberg.

== Plot ==
Scene of the novel is Norway in year 1911. Nineteen-year-old shopkeeper's daughter Cornelia Weding has lived with a terrifying and inexplicable memory since the age of five. She has tried to ignore these memories but they fill her mind in the shape of feelings, words and nightmares. In one of these fragmented memories, Cornelia as a child wanders alone in the hard of night-time and dark forest and searching for something. In another, there are enormous and frightening figures in black capes surrounding her childhood bed and threatening to kill her if she remembers.

To her misfortune, her beloved childhood friend is marrying her beautiful and evil cousin. When she travels to their wedding, which is being held in her stepmother's childhood home, she realizes that she has returned to the place where the dark mystery happened fourteen years ago.

Characters:

- Cornelia Weding, the principal character. Nineteen-year-old shopkeeper's daughter, who lives with a traumatic memory. She has light strawberry red colored hair, a childish face, and surprise of the all world in her wise eyes.
- Anna Weding, 24 years old, Cornelia's elder sister. She has the darker hair and skin than Cornelia. Brave, straightforward and outspoken. She is dating a lieutenant Sofus Hallgren.
- Pontus Weding, 26 years old, Cornelia's and Anna's elder brother. Pontus has grown up to be an inflexible man. He studies.
- Jon, 29 years old, a neighbour boy from Cornelia's childhood, and her secret love, who is marrying Cornelia's cousin Missy. He studies farming far from home.
- Lars, 26 years old, Jon's younger brother. Silent, interested in cars and has one.
- Mari-Lise, called "Missy", 26 years old, a cat woman, the cousin of Cornelia, Anna, and Pontus. However, she's not a relative of theirs, because she is the niece of their stepmother. Beautiful and evil seductress with thick, copper red hair. She hates Cornelia.
- Sofus Hallgren, lieutenant, Anna's dearly loved. Often visits the store owned by Cornelia's father.
- Christoffer Weding, shopkeeper and father to Cornelia, Anna, Pontus as well as two younger children. A sensible and understanding man.
- Matilda Weding is Christoffer's second wife. The three eldest of Christoffer's five children are not hers, since their mother died when Cornelia was born. Matilda is a nagging, silly and vain woman, who favours her own relatives, especially her niece Missy. Matilda thinks her family are better people compared to the Wedings because her grandmother was a noblewoman.
- Hans and Grethe, Matilda's and Christoffer's two little children who don't play large role in the novel. They are sweet and laborious, final turns in the family.
- Agnes, Matilda's sister and Missy's mother who has cold, ice blue eyes. She is married to the rich and imposing Knut Jörgen. Agnes' personality is similar to her sister's.
- Knut Jörgen, the rich and imposing, authority figure in the family, who married Agnes after her former husband went missing. Even though he appears to be a firm and decisive man, he yields easily to his wife's complaining and spoils his vain half daughter.
- Grandmother, who hasn't a proper name in the novel. She wears an old-fashioned black dress, haughty and dignified old lady who doesn't consider her daughter's husband candidates fairly if they don't come from a noble enough estate. However, she has a heart under her hard exterior and has more sense than both her silly daughters have together.
- Alfred Pettersen, the Agnes' former husband and Missy's father. The grandmother didn't like him. A pretty rascal, and no-one has heard from him since he ran off with circus ballerina many years ago.
