= Kjære Margit =

1994 book by Margit Sandemo

- Author: Margit Sandemo
- Language: Norwegian
- Subject: Autobiography of the author
- Genre: Non-fiction
- Publisher: Bladkompaniet AS
- Publication date: 1994
- Media type: Print (Hardback)
- Pages: 197
- ISBN: 82-509-3109-2
- OCLC: 164923465

Kjære Margit!: Et festskrift til Nordens folkelesningsdronning; Margit Sandemo 70 år (in English Dear Margit!:The Anniversary Book to the Queen of Readers of the Nordic Countries; Margit Sandemo 70 Years) is a Norwegian autobiographical book by Norwegian-Swedish fantasy writer Margit Sandemo. This book has not been translated into other languages, and it has been sold out from the publisher for many years. Kjære Margit was first published in 1994. It's the 70th anniversary book of the author, about the life story of Margit Sandemo from her birthplace in the valley of Grunke to the most popular novelist of Scandinavia. There are nearly 200 pages and 100 photographs in this book. In the book there is also a list of Sandemo's novels as well as the athour's comments.
