= Historien om en fjälldal =

Novel by Margit Sandemo

Historien om en fjälldal and Historien om en fjelldal in Norwegian (in Swedish: The History about a Mountain Valley) is a trilogy, written in Swedish, by a Norwegian-Swedish fantasy author Margit Sandemo, who has become better known for her historical suspense novels.

Historien om en fjälldal (ISBN 9177106067) is a fictionalized series of books about her birth valley, Grunke in Fagernes in the province of Valdres, which is situated in Norway. They were published between 1992 and 1998.

== Titles ==
- Örnens rike ("Realm of the Eagle")
- Korparnas dal ("Valley of the Ravens")
- Tranornas fristad ("Sanctuary of the Cranes")
