= Skimrande vårar =

1993 novel by Margit Sandemo

- Author: Margit Sandemo
- Language: Swedish, Norwegian
- Genre: Novel
- Publisher: Boknöje AB
- Publication date: 1993
- Media type: Pocket book
- Pages: 156
- ISBN: 91-7710-813-2
- OCLC: 186466002

Skimrande vårar in Swedish and Legenden om den øde skogen in Norwegian (in English Glittering Springs or Legend about the Inhabitant Forest; this novel has not been translated into English) is a short historical novel by author Margit Sandemo from 1993. This novel describes the life of six orphans which live alone in the middle of uninhabited forest. The main character of the novel is Juliane, the sixteen-year-old eldest sister. She and her older brother Jorulv must provide for their younger brothers and sisters after their mother died, and their father went to the town, a couple of days' walk away, and never came back. The winter is approaching, and Juliane and Jorulv wonder how they are going to survive. There is no one to help them, until Juliane meets a mysterious stranger she thinks might be the Forest God. This novel has translated also to Polish.
