= Sandemo-serien =

Novel series by Margit Sandemo

Schibstedforlagene AS has published Sandemo-serien as double volume from 2005.

Sandemo-serie in Swedish and Norwegian (in English Best Serials by Margit Sandemo; this set of serials has not been translated into English) is a 40-volume series of pulp fiction-novels by author Margit Sandemo. Those novels represent earliest works of Margit Sandemo. They were released in Norwegian women's magazines before year 1982.

== Titles ==
	Swedish title	Norwegian title	Translated title	Published	Pages	ISBN
1	Den svarta ängeln	Den sorte engel	The Black Angel	1990	158	ISBN 978-91-7710-462-9
2	Skogen har många ögon	Skogen har mange øyne	The Forest has Many Eyes	1990	157	ISBN 978-91-7710-463-6
3	Nattens tårar	Nattens tårer	Tears of the Night	1990	160	ISBN 978-91-7710-394-3
4	Snäckan	Konkylien	The Shell	1990	172	ISBN 978-91-7710-465-0
5	Farlig flykt	Farlig flukt	Dangerous Flight	1990	157	ISBN 978-91-7710-466-7
6	Flickan med silverhåret	Piken med sølvhåret	The Girl with the Silver Hair	1990	160	ISBN 978-91-7710-467-4
7	Över alla gränser	Over alle grenser	Over All Boundaries	1991	173	ISBN 978-91-7710-471-1
8	Bergtagen	Bergtatt	Enchanted	1991	173	ISBN 978-91-7710-472-8
9	De vita stenarna	De hvite steinene	The White Stones	1991	173	ISBN 978-91-7710-473-5
10	Förhäxad	Forhekset	Bewitched	1991	156	ISBN 978-91-7710-474-2
11	Djupt inne i skuggorna	Dypt inn i skyggene	Deep in the Shadows	1991	157	ISBN 978-91-7710-475-9
12	Fabians brud	Fabians brud	Fabian's Bride	1991	155	ISBN 978-91-7710-476-6
13	Tre gåtor	Det vanskelige valget	Three Riddles	1991	158	ISBN 978-91-7710-477-3
14	Vredens natt	Fredløse hjerter	Night of the Fury	1991	175	ISBN 978-91-7710-478-0
15	Under eviga stjärnor	Under evige stjerner	Under Eternal Stars	1991	253	ISBN 978-91-7710-480-3
16	Häxor kan inte gråta	Hekser kan ikke gråte	Witches Can't Cry	1991	253	ISBN 978-91-7710-481-0
17	Häxmästarens borg	Spøkelsesborgen	The Warlock's Castle	1992	255	ISBN 978-91-7710-482-7
18	Någon klagar i mörkret	Søk ikke for dypt	Someone Groans in the Darkness	1992	156	ISBN 978-91-7710-556-5
19	Grav under höstlöv	Grav under høstløv	Grave Under Autumn Leaves	1992	127	ISBN 978-91-7710-557-2
20	Vargen och månen	Ulven og månen	The Wolf and the Moon	1992	157	ISBN 978-91-7710-558-9
21	Liljegårdens hemlighet	Elskede, hvem er du?	The Secret of the Lily-garden	1992	172	ISBN 978-91-7710-559-6
22	Kärleken har många vägar	Meldt savnet	Love Has Many Ways	1992	175	ISBN 978-91-7710-560-2
23	Riddarens dotter	Ridderens datter	Daughter of the Knight			
24	Jungfrun från dimmornas skog	Jomfruen fra Tåkeskogen	The Maiden from the Fog Forest	1993	155	ISBN 978-91-7710-580-0
25	Tornet i fjärran	Tårnet i det fjerne	The Tower in the Distance	1993	174	ISBN 978-91-7710-576-3
26	Guldfågeln	Gullfuglen	The Gold Bird	1993	157	ISBN 978-91-7710-577-0
27	Nyckeln	Nøkkelen	The Key	1993	190	ISBN 978-91-7710-578-7
28	Kungabrevet	Kongens brev	The King's Letter	1993	156	ISBN 978-91-7710-579-4
29	Stjärntecknet	Stjernetegnet	The Star Symbol	1993	155	ISBN 978-91-7710-580-0
30	Barn av ensamheten	Barn av ensomheten	Isolation's child	1993	157	ISBN 978-91-7710-581-7
31	Ljuset på heden	Lyset på heden	The Light on the Heath	1993	156	ISBN 978-91-7710-582-4
32	De tre friarna	De tre frierne	The Three Suitors	1993	220	ISBN 978-91-7710-583-1
33	För mig finns ingen kärlek	For meg fins ingen kjærlighet	For Me there is no Love	1993	157	ISBN 978-91-7710-584-8
34	Svar till "ensam"	Brev til "Ensom"	Response to "Alone"	1993	156	ISBN 978-91-7710-585-5
35	Kyrkan vid havet	Kirken ved havet	The Church by the Sea	1994	156	ISBN 978-91-7710-586-2
36	Skuggan av en misstanke	Skyggen av en mistanke	In the Shadow of Suspicion	1994	154	ISBN 978-91-7710-587-9
37	De övergivna barnen	De forlatte barn	The Deserted Children	1994	156	ISBN 978-91-7710-588-6
38	Sindre, min son	Sindre, min sønn	Sindre, My Son	1994	154	ISBN 978-91-7710-589-3
39	Kungakronan	Kongekronen	The Crown of Kings	1994	189	ISBN 978-91-7710-590-9
40	Elva dagar i snö	Selv om jeg elsker deg	Eleven Days in Snow	1994	204	ISBN 978-91-7710-591-6
