= Häxmästaren =

Series of books by Margit Sandemo

Häxmästaren in Swedish and Heksemesteren in Norwegian (The Warlock in English) is a series of books by Norwegian-Swedish author Margit Sandemo. This series is Sandemo's second, following the extremely popular The Legend of the Ice People.

The series starts off with the Norwegian girl Tiril and Icelandic warlock Móri in the 18th century. It is set in Bergen, Norway and Iceland for the first few books, then moving to Sweden in book three. Later the action returns to Norway and expands more throughout the series.

This series has not been translated to English, but can be found in Finnish, Hungarian, Icelandic, Norwegian, Polish, and Swedish.

The main theme in Häxmästaren is love, mystery, drama, and the supernatural.

== Titles ==
	Swedish title	Norwegian title	Translated title	Published	Pages	ISBN
1	Trolldom	Trolldom	Sorcery	1991	255	ISBN 951-636-087-4
2	Ljuset i dina ögon	Lyset i dine øyne	The Light in Your Eyes	1991	254	ISBN 951-636-088-2
3	När mörkret faller	Når mørket faller på	When Darkness Falls	1992	254	ISBN 951-636-091-2
4	Ondskans ansikte	Ondskapens ansikt	The Face of Evil	1992	254	ISBN 951-636-097-1
5	Eldprovet	Ildprøven	The Ordeal	1992	248	ISBN 951-636-101-3
6	Irrbloss	Alvelys	Will-o'-the-wisp	1992	252	ISBN 951-636-104-8
7	De värnlösa	Vergeløs	Defenceless	1993	250	ISBN 951-636-106-4
8	Ritten mot väster	Rittet mot vest	The Ride Westward	1993	250	ISBN 951-636-111-0
9	Eldsvärdet	Ildsverdet	The Fire Sword	1993	254	ISBN 951-636-113-7
10	Dvärgarop	Dvergemål	Dwarven Call	1993	252	ISBN 951-636-115-3
11	Skammens hus	Skammens Hus	House of Shame	1993	254	ISBN 951-636-119-6
12	Sagor om glömda riken	Sagn om glemte riker	Tale of Forgotten Realms	1993	252	ISBN 951-636-122-6
13	Klostret i Tårarnas Dal	Klosteret i Tårenes Dal	Monastery in the Valley of Tears	1994	253	ISBN 951-636-123-4
14	Frostens dotter	Frostens datter	Daughter of the Frost	1994	252	ISBN 951-636-125-0
15	In i det okända	Inn i det ukjente	Into the Unknown	1994	253	ISBN 951-636-127-7

== Titles in other languages ==
	Heksemesteren (Norwegian)	Saga o Czarnoksiężniku (Polish)	Galdrameistarinn (Icelandic)	Noitamestari (Finnish)	A Boszorkánymester (Hungarian)
1	Trolldom	Magiczne księgi	Galdrar	Taikuus	Megigézve
2	Lyset i dine øyne	Blask twoich oczu	Blikið í augum þínum	Silmiesi valo	Szemed fénye
3	Når mørkret faller på	Zaklęty las	Skuggar	Pimeyden mahti	Ha leszáll az éj
4	Ondskapens ansikt	Oblicze zła	Andlit grimmdar	Pahuuden kasvot	A gonosz arca
5	Ildprøven	Próba ognia	Eldskírnin	Tulikoe	-
6	Alvelys	Światła elfów	Hrævareldur	Virvatulet	-
7	Vergeløs	Bezbronni	Hin varnarlausu	Suojattomat	-
8	Ritten mot vest	Droga na zachód	Í vesturátt	Ratsastus länteen	-
9	Ildsverdet	Ognisty miecz	Engill í vanda	Tulimiekka	-
10	Dvergemål	Echo	Dvergaóp	Maahisten kutsu	-
11	Skammens hus	Dom hańby	Hús syndarinnar	Häpeän talo	-
12	Sagn om glemte riker	Zapomniane królestwa	Horfnir heimar	Taru unohtuneesta valtakunnasta	-
13	Klosteret i Tårenes Dal	Klasztor w Dolinie łez	Klaustrið í Táradal	Luostari kyynelten laaksossa	-
14	Frostens datter	Córka Mrozu	Dóttir frostsins	Hallan tytär	-
15	Inn i det ukjente	W nieznane	Ókunnur heimur	Tuntematon tie	-
