= The Legend of the Ice People =

1982–89 series of novels by Margit Sandemo

- 2012 e-book cover for the English e-book adaptation of Spellbound
- Author: Margit Sandemo
- Original title: Sagan om Isfolket (Swedish)
- Language: Norwegian
- Genre: Adventure; Fantasy; Paranormal Romance; Historical
- Publisher: Jentas
- Published: 1982–1989

The Legend of the Ice People (in Norwegian language Sagaen om Isfolket) is a 47-volume story of a family bloodline, first published in 1982. The author of the series is Margit Sandemo. The novels are predominantly based in Scandinavia and focus on historical fact, but contain some fantastical elements. The first volume was released 1982, and the series became one of the best-selling series of novels in Scandinavia, with more than 39 million copies sold.

The series was originally written in Swedish, but has been translated into over eight languages including Norwegian, Finnish, Polish, Czech, Icelandic, Russian, Hungarian and English.

The book series consists of three parts where The Legend of the Ice People is part one. Part two is a spin-off series placed in the years between 1600 and 1700. It is also a prequel to book 31 The Ferry Man. (Swedish original title; Färjkarlen) Here we learn the background story of the mystical medallions that the characters Benedikte and Sander finds. This second series is called Häxmästaren in Swedish and translates to The Warlock. The scenery throughout the second series is mostly placed on Iceland, and in Norway, Sweden and Austria. It consists of 15 books, and other connections to The Legend of the Ice People are the spirits and souls of mostly Sol and Tengel the good. They come in later on in the series to help the Icelandic warlock and his family.

The last part of the series is called Legenden om ljusets rike, which translates to The Legend of the Kingdom of Light. It is made of 20 books and merges the two series together, being a sequel to both series. It starts at the same moment and scene where The witch master ends in a cliffhanger. The story then flash forward to the 1990s, approximately 20–30 years after The Legend of the Ice People ends. The story follows the characters from the last couple of The Legend of the Ice People books, as well as their families. Some of them are Marco, Ellen, Nathaniel, and Gabriel and their children who befriend the children of the Warlock's family.

The third part of the series is somewhat different. It leans more heavily into the fantasy genre than other books in the series, and it also has elements of science fiction. It mostly take place inside the Earth's crust. There is a secret kingdom in the core where time goes 12 times slower than on the surface of the Earth and where the physical body stop aging. The story has two major antagonists. One is the main source of the black water that Tengel from The Legend of the Ice People got his power from. The other is pollution and human society's destruction of the earth. The heroes try to save the Earth before it is too late and all animals and plants go extinct. The series ends in the future in the year 2080.

The complete Legend of the Ice people-series with 82 books.

Part 1. The Legend of the Ice People Original title; Sagan om Isfolket. 47 books.

Part 2. The Warlock. Original title; Häxmästaren. 15 books.

Part 3. The Legend of the Kingdom of Light. Original title; Legenden om ljusets rike. 20 books.

== Plot ==
The story begins in Trondheim, Norway in 1581, with the story of Silje Arngrimsdotter, and how she comes into contact with the Ice People, a community of outcasts living in an isolated valley. From there on it follows the Ice People through the centuries, with members of the clan migrating from Norway to Denmark and Sweden. Other members of the clan wind up in or visit various corners of Europe and Asia over the course of the series.

The Ice People are cursed with a terrible forefather, Tengel the Evil, whose actions resulted in at least one cursed individual being born in every generation. The cursed individuals were born with magical and mystical abilities, but also the potential for bottomless evil. Some the cursed people have yellow eyes, malformed shoulder blades and Mongol features, while others have yellow eyes but are otherwise beautiful. Some cursed individuals fight their tendency for evil, whilst others embrace it.

Each book tells a separate story, very often the story of one or a few individuals of the clan. Quite often the protagonist of each book is a female, sometimes of the Ice People, but sometimes one who will marry into the clan. Many of the books also focus on the cursed individuals, their battle with their evil tendencies, and also how they utilise their powers, be it for good or evil.

Throughout the series, the cursed and their helpers steadily increase their efforts to rid the clan of the curse from Tengel the Evil. But the beastly forefather is not dead. He is merely sleeping, awaiting a special signal that will wake him up and allow him to take over the entire world with a reign of terror. Before this signal is played, his descendants must find a way to defeat Tengel and rid themselves and the world of his curse. The final battle will require the birth of a very special individual as well as the help of some powerful mythological creatures.

== Adaptations ==
=== Graphic novel ===
There is an ongoing release of graphic novels in Swedish and Norwegian, made by Swedish cartoonists Raymond and his wife Mona Husac. They have their own publishing company named Nattfrost förlag. The first number was released in 2015 and is titled Förbannelsen in Swedish, which translates to The curse in English. The latest Graphic novel (from the time this was written) was released in the end of 2020. It was number 8 and titled Villemo after the main character in the book it is based on, book 11 in The legend of the Ice people, with the original title Blodshämnd translated to The blood feud/ The blood revenge or Vendetta.

=== Stage ===
In 2008 stage productions based upon the first three novels in the Legend of the Ice People premiered, receiving positive reviews from critics.

=== Television ===
In 2011 it was announced that a television adaptation of the series was being planned, with an estimated length of 200 episodes.

== The Legend of the Ice People ==
	Swedish title	Norwegian title	Danish title	Icelandic title	Translated title	English title	Polish title	Hungarian title	Finnish title	Spanish title	German title	Published
1	Trollbunden	Trollbundet	Troldbunden	Álagafjötrar	Spellbound	Spellbound	Zauroczenie	Varázslat	Lumottu	El hechizo	Der Zauberbund	1982
2	Häxjakten	Heksejakten	Heksejagten	Nornaveiðar	The Witch-hunt	Witch-hunt	Polowanie na czarownice	Átkos örökség	Noitavaino	La caza de brujas	Hexenjagd	1982
3	Avgrunden	Avgrunnen	Plejedatteren	Hyldýpið	The Precipice	The Stepdaughter	Otchłań	Örvényben	Syvyyden kutsu	La hijastra	Der Abgrund	1982
4	Längtan	Lengsel	Arvingen	Vonin	Longing	The Successor	Tęsknota	Vágyakozás	Kaipaus	El heredero	Sehnsucht	1982
5	Dödssynden	Dødssynden	Venskab	Dauðasyndin	The Mortal Sin	Friendship	Grzech śmiertelny	Halálos bűn	Kuolemansynti	La amistad	Todsünde	1982
6	Det onda arvet	Den onde arven	Den onde arv	Illur arfur	The Evil Legacy	Evil Legacy	Dziedzictwo zła	Nincs menekülés	Pahan perintö	El legado del mal	Das böse Erbe	1982
7	Spökslottet (novel)	Spøkelsesslottet	Nemesis	Draugahöllin	The Ghost Castle	Nemesis	Zamek duchów	Kísértetkastély	Aavelinna	Némesis	Das Spukschloss	1982
8	Bödelns dotter	Bøddelens datter	Mistænkt	Dóttir böðulsins	The Executioner's Daughter	Under Suspicion	Córka hycla	A pribék lánya	Pyövelin tytär	Bajo sospecha	Die Henkerstochter	1982
9	Den ensamme	Den ensomme	Rodløs	Skuggi fortíðar	The Lonely One	Without Roots	Samotny	A magányos lovag	Muukalainen	El desarraigo	Der Einsame	1982
10	Vinterstorm	Vinterstorm	Vinterstorm	Vetrarhríð	Winter Storm	Winter Storm	Zimowa zawierucha	Hóvihar	Talvimyrsky	Tormenta de invierno		1983
11	Blodshämnd	Blodhevn	Blodhævn	Blóðhefnd	Blood Feud	Blood Feud	Zemsta	Vérbosszú	Verikosto			1983
12	Feber i blodet	Feber i blodet	Længsel	Ástarfuni	Fever in the Blood	Yearning	Gorączka	Nyugtalan szív	Kuumetta veressä			1983
13	Satans fotspår	Satans fotspor	Satans fodspor	Fótspor Satans	Footprints of Satan	The Devil's Footprint	Ślady Szatana	A sátán lábnyoma	Paholaisen jalanjäljet			1983
14	Den siste riddaren	Den siste ridder	Ridderen	Síðasti riddarinn	The Last Knight	The Knight	Ostatni rycerz	Remény nélkül	Viimeinen ritari			1983
15	Vinden från öster	Vinden fra øst	Østenvind	Austanvindar	The Wind from the East	The East Wind	Wiatr od Wschodu	Keleti szél	Idän tuuli			1984
16	Galgdockan	Galgeblomsten	Alrunen	Gálgablómið	The Mandrake	The Mandrake	Kwiat wisielców	A bitófa virága	Hirsipuunukke			1984
17	Dödens trädgård	Dødens have	Dødens have	Garður dauðans	The Garden of Death	The Garden of Death	Ogród śmierci	A halál kertje	Kuoleman puutarha			1984
18	Bakom fasaden	Bak fasaden	Bag facaden	Gríman fellur	Behind the Facade	Behind the Facade	Dom upiorów	Maszkabál	Julkisivun takana			1984
19	Drakens tänder	Dragens tenner	Dragens tænder	Tennur drekans	The Dragon's Teeth	The Dragon's Teeth	Zęby smoka	Sárkányfogvetemény	Lohikäärmeen hammas			1984
20	Korpens vingar	Ravnens vinger	Ravnens vinger	Hrafnsvængir	Wings of the Raven	The Wings of the Raven	Skrzydła kruka	Hollószárnyak suhogása	Korpin siivet			1985
21	Vargtimmen	Djevlekløften	Djælvlekløften	Um óttubil	The Wolf Hour	Devil's Ravine	Diabelski Jar	Farkasok órája	Sudenhetki			1985
22	Demonen och jungfrun	Demonen og jomfruen	Dæmonen og jomfruen	Jómfrúin og vætturin	The Demon and the Maiden	The Demon and the Virgin	Demon i panna	Démon és angyal	Neitsyt ja demoni			1985
23	Våroffer	Våroffer	Ritualer	Vorfórn	Spring Sacrifice	Rituals	Wiosenna ofiara	Áldozat	Kevätuhri			1985
24	Djupt i jorden	I jordens dyp	I jordens dyb	Í iðrum jarðar	Deep in the Ground	Deep in the Ground	Martwe Wrzosy	A mélyben	Maan uumenissa			1985
25	Ängel med dolda horn	Engel med svarte vinger	Englen	Guðsbarn eða galdranorn	Angel with Hidden Horns	The Angel	Anioł o czarnych skrzydłach	Álnok tündér	Sarvipänen enkeli			1985
26	Huset i Eldafjord	Huset i Eldafjord	Hemmeligheden	Álagahúsið	The House in Eldafjord	The Secret	Dom w Eldafjord	Az eldafjordi ház	Tulivuonon talo			1986
27	Synden har lång svans	Skandalen	Skandalen	Hneykslið	Sin has a Long Tail	The Scandal	Skandal	Skandalum	Valheella on lyhyet jäljet			1986
28	Is och eld	Is og ild	Is og ild	Ís og eldur	Ice and Fire	Ice and Fire	Lód i ogień	Láng és jég	Tuli ja jää			1986
29	Lucifers kärlek	Lucifers kjærlighet	Lucifers kærlighed	Ástir Lúcífers	Lucifer's Love	Lucifer's Love	Miłość Lucyfera	Lucifer szerelme	Luciferin rakkaus			1986
30	Människadjuret	Utysket	Brødrene	Ókindin	The Man-Beast	The Brothers	Bestia i wilki	A dúvad	Ihmiseläin			1986
31	Färjkarlen	Fergemannen	Færgemanden	Ferjumaðurinn	The Ferryman	The Ferryman	Przewoźnik	A révész	Lautturi			1987
32	Hunger	Hunger	Hunger	Hungur	Hunger	Hunger	Głód	Éhség	Nälkä			1987
33	Nattens demon	Nattens demon	Nattens dæmoner	Martröð	The Demon of the Night	Demon of the Night	Demon Nocy	Nem isten, nem ember	Yön demoni			1987
34	Kvinnan på stranden	Kvinnen på stranden	Kvinden på stranden	Konan á ströndinni	The Woman on the Beach	The Woman on the Beach	Kobieta na brzegu	A tengerparti lány	Nainen rannalla			1987
35	Vandring i mörkret	Vandring i mørket	Fløjtespil	Myrkraverk	Wanderings in Darkness	The Flute	Droga w ciemnościach	Vándorlás a sötétben	Pimeä tie			1987
36	Trollmåne	Trollmåne	Troldmåne	Galdratungl	Magic Moon	Troll Moon	Magiczny księżyc	Holdvarázs	Taikakuu			1987
37	Stad i skräck	Skrekkens by	Skrækkens by	Vágestur	A Town in Fear	The City of Horror	Miasto strachu	A rettegő város	Kaupunki pelon vallassa			1987
38	Små män kastar långa skuggor	Skjulte spor	Skjulte spor	Í skugga stríðsins	Small Men Throw Long Shadows	Hidden Traces	Urwany ślad	Csigaház	Pienet miehet, pitkät varjot			1988
39	Rop av stumma röster	Rop av stumme røster	Tavse stemmer	Raddirnar	Screams of Silent Voices	Silent Voices	Nieme głosy	Hangtalan sikoly	Mykkien äänten huuto			1988
40	Fångad av tiden	Fanget av tiden	Fanget af tiden	Fangi tímans	Imprisoned by Time	Imprisoned by Time	Więźniowie czasu	A múlt börtönében	Ajan vanki			1988
41	Demonernas fjäll	Demonenes fjell	Dæmonens bjerg	Djöflafjallið	Demon Mountain	Demon's Mountain	Góra Demonów	A démonok hegyén	Demonien vuori			1988
42	Lugnet före stormen	Stille før stormen	Stilhed før stormen	Úr launsátri	The Calm Before the Storm	The Calm Before the Storm	Cisza przed burzą	Vihar előtti csend	Tyyntä myrskyn edellä			1988
43	En glimt av ömhet	Et streif av ømhet	Et glimt af ømhed	Í blíðu og stríðu	A Glimpse of Tenderness	A Glimpse of Tenderness	Odrobina czułości	A szeretet hatalma	Hellyyden hetki			1989
44	Den onda dagen	Den onde dagen	Den onde dag	Skapadægur	The Evil Day	An Evil Day	Fatalny dzień	Baljós nap	Pahuuden päivät			1989
45	Legenden om Marco	Legenden om Marco	Legenden	Böðullinn	The Legend of Marco	The Legend	Książę Czarnych Sal	Marco legendája	Marcon tarina			1989
46	Det svarta vattnet	Det svarte vannet	Det sorte vand	Svarta vatnið	The Black Water	The Black Water	Woda zła	A fekete víz	Musta vesi			1989
47	Är det någon därute?	Er det noen der ute?	Er der nogen derude?	Er einhver þarna úti?	Is There Anybody Out There?	Is There Anybody Out There?	Czy jesteśmy tutaj sami?	Van valaki odakint?	Onko siellä joku?			1989
