= Margit Sandemo =

Swedish writer

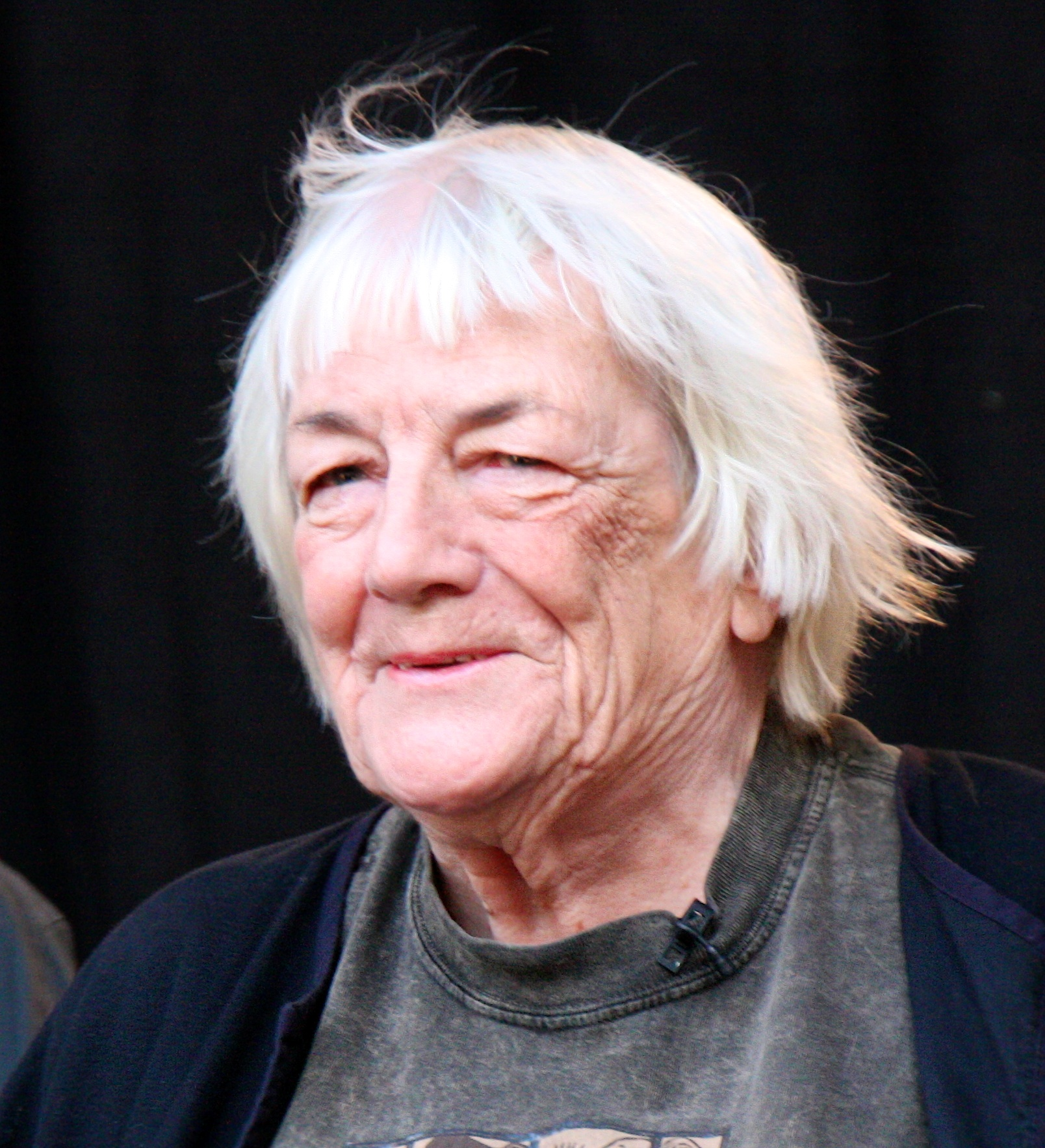
- Sandemo at the Oslo Book Festival, 2010.
- Born: Margit Underdal; 23 April 1924; Lena, Norway
- Died: 1 September 2018 (aged 94); Scania, Sweden
- Occupation: Novelist
- Spouse: Asbjørn Sandemo (m. 1946–1999)
- Children: 3
- Writing career
- Genres: Historical fantasy, pulp fiction

Margit Sandemo (née Underdal, 23 April 1924 – 1 September 2018) was a Norwegian-Swedish historical fantasy author. She has been the best-selling author in the Nordic countries since the 1980s, when her novel series of 47 books, The Legend of the Ice People, was published. She also wrote many other book series such as Häxmästaren and Legenden om Ljusets rike.

Typical features for works of Margit Sandemo are among other things history, fantasy, romance, suspense and supernatural phenomena. The plots of her books are often very complex and meandering, and continue from one book to another. In the central role are distinct amulets, old writings and symbols, which the main characters decipher in order to solve riddles stage by time, while fighting against evil powers. The events of the majority of her novels take place in Europe in the Middle Ages and in the beginning of Modern Times, especially in Norway and Iceland. Sometimes the main characters have adventures further away, such as in Spain and Austria. Medieval knight castles, bewitched forests and old-fashioned, idyllic manor milieu are among the settings the stories take place in.

Among her literary role models, Sandemo named William Shakespeare, Fyodor Dostoevsky, J.R.R. Tolkien, Agatha Christie and Kjersti Scheen. She read the whole of works of Shakespeare at the age of eight years, and wasn't much older when she turned to crime novels. Kalevala, the national epic of the Finnish people, Winnie the Pooh by A. A. Milne and King Lear were her favourites. In the adult age she has read significantly less, fearing subconscious plagiarizing. She says that she has got artistic influences also from the Kalevala motifed paintings of Akseli Gallen-Kallela and goblin motifed paintings of Gerhard Munthe. Other sources of inspiration have been classical music, such as the compositions of Johann Sebastian Bach and Ludwig van Beethoven as well as old Europeans folk stories. Besides these she is fond of Star Wars films, thriller film The Silence of the Lambs directed by Jonathan Demme and earliest episodes of TV-series The X-Files. To her mind the newest episodes of the series are pure rubbish.

== Biography ==
=== Parents and family ===
Margit Sandemo was born on 23 April 1924 on a farm in Lena in Østre Toten Municipality which is located in the Valdres region of Norway.

Sandemo's father was a Norwegian poet, Anders Underdal (1880 – 1973). Underdal was born in Valdres out of wedlock, and according to Sandemo herself, after an alleged affair between the Nobel Prize–winning Norwegian author Bjørnstjerne Bjørnson (1832–1910) and a 17-year-old croft girl named Guri Andersdotter (1863–1949). Audun Thorsen has written a book contradicting this allegation, entitled Bjørnsons kvinne og Margit Sandemos "familiehemmelighet" (in English: "Bjørnson's Woman and the "Family Secret" of Margit Sandemo") (Genesis forlag, Oslo, 1999). During her childhood it was thought that the alleged unmarried affair with Bjørnstjerne Bjørnson must be kept secret. Even Anders Underdal, who early on gave an account of his origin to his children, fell silent about that matter later in life. Sandemo doesn't like talking about her ancestry in public.

Sandemo's mother was a Swedish noblewoman, Elsa Reuterskiöld (1892 – 1967). Elsa was a teacher, born in Blekinge as the 4th eldest of nine children of the county chief Axel Gabriel Adam Reuterskiöld (1863 – 1938) and Finnish-Swedish countess Eva Beata Gabriella Oxenstierna (1864 – 1949) from Korsholm and Wasa. As a Social Democrat Elsa Reuterskiöld took an active part in politics. According to her own claims, Sandemo on her mother's side was a descendant of numerous European noble families, and over 800 kings and 112 emperors were counted among her ancestors. Her earliest ancestors have been traced as far back as year 350 BC.

Elsa Reuterskiöld met Anders Underdal the first time in her summer holiday journey in a valley in Valdres. They married quite soon after that on 15 June 1921 and Underdal bought a small farm, Huldrehaugen, which was located at Grunke in Vestre Slidre Municipality (not too far from the town of Fagernes). There the couple had five children, Margit being the second eldest. Her older sister was named Eva and her younger brothers, from the oldest to the youngest were: Axel, Anders and Embrik. There is only a seven-year age gap between the eldest and the youngest. One of the brothers, Anders, committed suicide in the 1950s at the age of 29.

=== Childhood ===
Reuterskiöld and Underdal divorced in 1930, when Sandemo was six. When Reuterskiöld moved back to Sweden, she took her five children along. Without any permanent address, the family had to spend irregular vagrancy life living in the corners of their relative's manors in various parts of Sweden. This was in Margit Sandemo's opinion somewhat humiliating. During her time in Sweden, she missed her birthplace in Valdres, Norway, which she still considered her true national place.

Margit Sandemo never had a good relationship with her father. He was a strict man, punishing his children by locking them in a closet. During the German occupation of Norway in World War II he supported the Nazis openly - for which Margit would never forgive him. His obituary read: "Thank you God, why did you not let this happen sooner?". Margit Sandemo tried to interact with her father as little as possible, that way she didn't have to speak badly about him afterwards.

Margit had her compulsory education in a nine-year girls school, after which she studied at various night schools, as in an art school and was as an auditor at Dramaten. She got good grades, the best for behaviour, even though she never took schooling seriously. Sandemo had a gift for arts as a child. She was skilled at painting, singing, acting and poetry, making her mother very proud. However, she did not have any dreams to become a novelist. Margit spent her childhood summer at the estate of her grandparents in Blekinge.

During her childhood, Sandemo was raped several times. First at age seven, then at age nine, which caused a lifelong injury and inspired scenes in the 38th volume of the novel series Sagan om Isfolket, Små män kastar långa skuggor (in English: Small Men Throw Long Shadows). In October 2004, she stated in an interview given to Swedish newspaper Aftonbladet that she killed her third rapist, a peddler, to whom she fell victim at the age of twelve. . After she finished her autobiography Livsglede in the beginning of 2010, Margit Sandemos sister, Eva Underdal, told her she was actually raped a fourth time. She must have rejected the memory of this event later as she has no memory of it. These tragic and violent experiences led to her attempted suicide at the age of 17, using sleeping pills.

=== Marriage ===
In 1945, Margit met her future husband Asbjørn Sandemo (1917–1999) during the haymaking in the West Mountains of Vestre Slidre Municipality in Valdres. Asbjørn, a son of Ludvig Andersen (1879–1972) and Hulda Karlsson (1889–1956) came from Idd in Baleen and was a plumber by trade and a WWII veteran. By now, Margit's mother, Elsa Reuterskiöld, had ended her wandering life style and settled down in Valsberga in Södermanland. Asbjörn and Margit first moved there also, mostly because they didn't have anywhere else to go. They married on 29 March 1946 in Strängnäs. They had seven children, but only three survived; the other four were stillborn or miscarried. The three children are Henrik (b. 24 December 1945), Tove (b. 1949) and Bjørn (b. 1950). The family moved back to Huldrehaugen in Valdres in 1964. Margit Sandemo had seven grandchildren and five greatgrandchildren (2009). The eldest grandchild was born in 1969.

While Margit chose her professional career, she knew only that it should be artistic. She tried painting, tree-cutting, textile art, sculpture, folk singing and acting in a play by Ingmar Bergman. She also tried office work for two months. Once she tried stone-cutting, but it blocked their sewer system up and they were forced to blow it out with dynamite? She was never happy with any of these other professions anyway.

=== Literary career ===
Margit wrote her debut novel Tre Friare ("Three Suitors") at the age of forty. At that time, she had no experience in writing; however, she had already outlined thirty of the following novels in her mind. She has said that being a novelist is something you are born to do, rather than become. Tre Friare was rejected from different publishers more than hundred times, until the publisher of Ernst G. Mortensen in Oslo decided to serialize it in a magazine. Sandemo, who wished it to be published in book form, first couldn't accept this, but soon calmed down. A series of serial novels followed the debut work. Margit wrote her thirty first novels at Siesta Café Konditori, the railway coffee bar in Fagernes. She is still in the habit of drafting her novels first there. Later all serial novels by her were published as a forty-volume series of novels called Margit Sandemos bästa följetonger (The Best Serial Novels by Margit Sandemo).

Her books, which weave supernatural themes with historical facts, have made her well-loved throughout Nordic countries and beyond. Her books can be read in Danish, Finnish, German, Hungarian, Icelandic, Norwegian, Polish and Swedish. In early 2007, it was revealed that her series Isfolket would be published in English for the first time. She has written some stand-alone books, but her main claims to fame are her series.

== Book series ==
=== Legend of the Ice People ===
Of her extensive series, Sagan om Isfolket (Legend of the Ice People) is perhaps what she is best known for. It comprises 47 books, which follow a family for generations from the 16th century until present day as they battle a terrible curse.

In 1980, a publisher, "Bladkompaniet", suggested that Margit Sandemo write a series of historical novels. She initially wasn't excited about the idea, and decided to continue writing novel series for magazines, but, in her own words, changed her mind in 1981 when she saw a picture of a medieval church painting in a newspaper. It showed a woman making butter in a butter churn and the Devil behind her, trying to seduce her. Sandemo got the idea for the entire 47 book series The Legend of the Ice People from this picture, although in the beginning she thought that the series would comprise only eight books. The first volume, Spellbound, was published in 1982.

=== Trollrunor ===
Trollrunor (English Magical Runes; this series has not been translated into English) is a historical series of novels which takes place in Österlen, Sweden in the end of Middle Ages. Main characters of Trollrunor are a young girl named Iliana and her partner Ravn, who is a younger son of evil lord Bogislav. Their enemy is the malicious Moon Witch. First part of this set of books came out 2005, and it has been published in Swedish and Norwegian. Trollrunor includes eleven books, and nine of them have been published until this date. The eleventh book will be published 26 November 2007 in Norway and a few weeks later in Sweden.

=== Books published in English ===
Spellbound by Margit Sandemo (the first book in the Sagan om Isfolket series, translated as The Legend of the Ice People) was published in English in the UK by The Tagman Press on 30 June 2008. Sandemo came to London to promote its publication. Five additional books from the series were also published in 2008.
