= CCAV =

CCAV may refer to:

- Chinese Consumers' Association of Vancouver
- Centre for Connected and Autonomous Vehicles
