= Chinese Canadians in Greater Vancouver =

Chinese Canadians in Vancouver
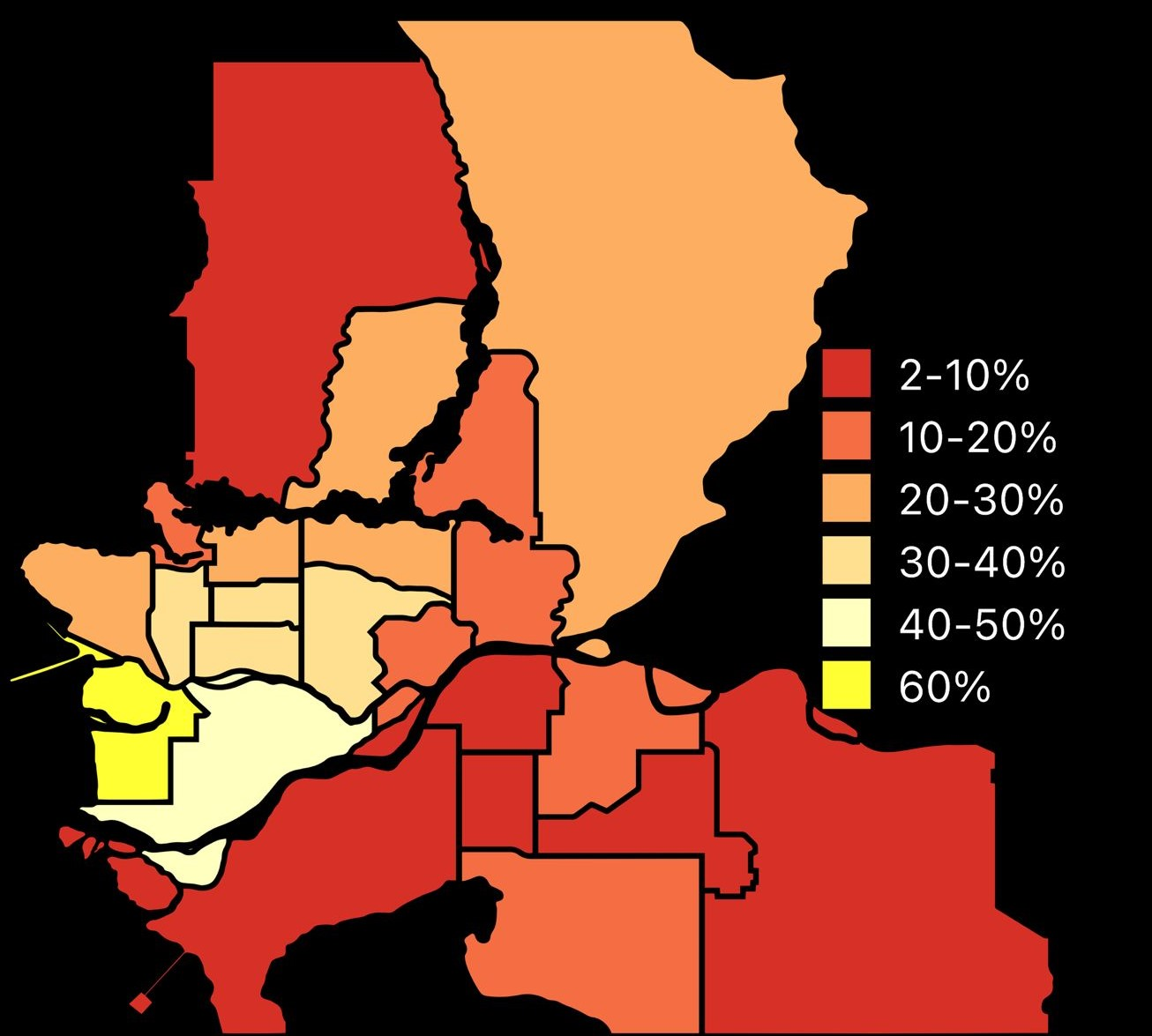
- Population distribution of Chinese Canadians in Vancouver by federal electoral district, 2021 census

Chinese Canadians are a sizable part of the population in Greater Vancouver, especially in the Chinese communities in the city of Vancouver and the adjoining suburban city of Richmond. The legacy of Chinese immigration is prevalent throughout the Vancouver area.

Chinese Canadians have been a presence in Vancouver since its 1886 incorporation. Shifts in the economy of smaller towns in British Columbia and immigration caused the size of Vancouver's ethnic Chinese community to increase. Like those of other areas of North America, Vancouver's initial Chinese population was mainly from Guangdong province.

A new wave of immigration started in the middle of the 20th century, continuing to the present. The first wave originated from Hong Kong, and subsequent waves of immigration from Taiwan and Mainland China changed the composition of the Chinese community.

With the community rapidly growing, by the 2021 Canadian census, Chinese Canadians enumerated 512,260, or 19.38%, of the metropolitan area's total population.

== History ==
=== Early history ===
There were 114 Chinese in the Burrard Inlet area in 1884. The population included 60 sawmill hands, 30 cooks and washing persons, ten store clerks, five merchants, three married women, and one prostitute. The sawmill hands worked at Hasting's Sawmill. Additional Chinese settled an area north of False Creek after an 1885 announcement that the terminus of the railway was to be extended to that area. Former railroad workers caused Vancouver's population to increase.

The city of Vancouver incorporated in April 1886; at the time, the city had a pre-existing Chinese population. The Chinese coming to Vancouver had originated from Guangdong. Many Chinese worked at Hastings Sawmill upon arrival, and many Chinese worked in logging camps, mills, and in forest-clearing crews. Property owners hired Chinese to clear forests because the Chinese were the cheapest laborers available.

Vancouver gained the Chinese name Erbu, which means "Second Port". However New Westminster also had the name "Erbu". To disambiguate the two cities, Chinese persons referred to Vancouver as Xianshui Erbu, which means "the Second Port on Brackish Water". This name was used in place of Erbu and continues to be used as of 2007. But these namings are rendered in Mandarin (pinyin Romanization) so are not the pronunciation of Cantonese speaking early Southeast Asian settlers. Vancouver gained the Cantonese name of Saltwater City: haam sui fau (xian shui bu <Mandarin).

Discriminatory actions against Chinese occurred early in the city's history, including mob violence, newspaper articles asking for preventing Chinese from living in Vancouver, and post-Great Vancouver Fire street resolutions asking for preventing the return of the Chinese. In the period's newspaper articles, according to James Morton, author of In the Sea of Sterile Mountains, "anti-Chinese sentiment appeared to be unanimous". The practice of contractors hiring labour crews of only one race had caused the wage disparity between whites and Chinese, and according to Paul Yee, author of Saltwater City: Story of Vancouver's Chinese Community, the lower pay of the Chinese workers was the "classic explanation" for anti-Chinese sentiment among whites. Morton stated that "Greedy speculators" had chosen to use Chinese labourers despite the abundance of White labourers. Some historians argued that whites desiring a racially homogenous White Canada was another strong factor in anti-Chinese sentiment. In early 1886 one party in the mayoral election in Vancouver prevented Chinese people (i.e. “Chinamen” in the vernacular of the day, with other negative epithets such as Chinks and Celestials) from voting.

In 1900, there were 36 Chinese laundries in Chinatown. The city government had passed a law in 1893 that the section of Pender Street between Carrall and Columbia was the only place which could have laundry businesses; Paul Yee stated that enforcement of this law was very difficult. Therefore, in 1900, the permitted zone had only two Chinese laundries. The city government later passed laws that harmed smaller Chinese laundries to benefit white-owned laundries. The Chinese hired Wilson V. Sekler, a lawyer, to get the laws overturned.

=== 20th and 21st centuries ===
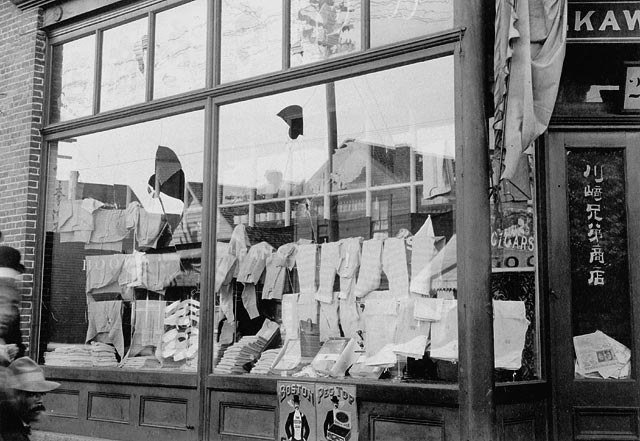
Damage after the September 1907 riot in Vancouver

In 1907, the Asiatic Exclusion League sponsored a parade in Vancouver that opposed persons of Asian origin. This parade developed into a riot that caused damage to Vancouver's Chinatown and Japantown.

The 1911 census stated that Vancouver had 3,559 Chinese, giving it the largest Chinese population in all of Canada. Around that year 3,500 persons alone lived in Vancouver's Chinatown, and it was Canada's largest Chinatown. According to the census, Vancouver's Chinese population increased to 6,500, including about 600 women and over 500 children attending public schools, due to immigration from 1911-1914 and in the immediate post-World War I period, by 1921. A 1919 missionary report stated that of Vancouver's Chinese, 7% were born in Canada, and that there were a total of 210 Chinese families. The Chinese community was served by six schools and one hospital by the 1920s. During the same decade, the community had two Chinese theatres providing recreation.

As part of the Great Depression, many Chinese began leaving small towns and settling in Vancouver and Victoria. In 1931 the Chinese populations of Vancouver and Victoria combined became more numerous than the Chinese elsewhere in British Columbia.

In the mid-20th Century Chinese began moving from smaller British Columbia towns to Vancouver and eastern Canada because of the collapse of some of British Columbia's agricultural industries. The rise of agricultural operations in the United States in the market in the 1950s made local British Columbia market gardening unprofitable, and this deprived Chinese remaining in the province's interior of their livelihood. The consequence was a decline in small town Chinese populations that began in that decade. In 1961-1962 about 18,000 ethnic Chinese were resident in the Vancouver area.

Some Mainland Chinese were fleeing political developments in the mid-20th century, while tensions between the Mainland and Taiwan resulted in some Taiwanese moving to Vancouver. In the late 1980s and 1990s, a wave of Chinese from Hong Kong came to Vancouver, prompted by anxieties related to the upcoming 1997 Handover of Hong Kong. Levels of Chinese coming from Hong Kong declined after the handover occurred.

Vivienne Poy wrote that instances of antagonism towards Chinese and incidents of racial hatred targeting Chinese occurred by the late 1980s.

== Geography ==
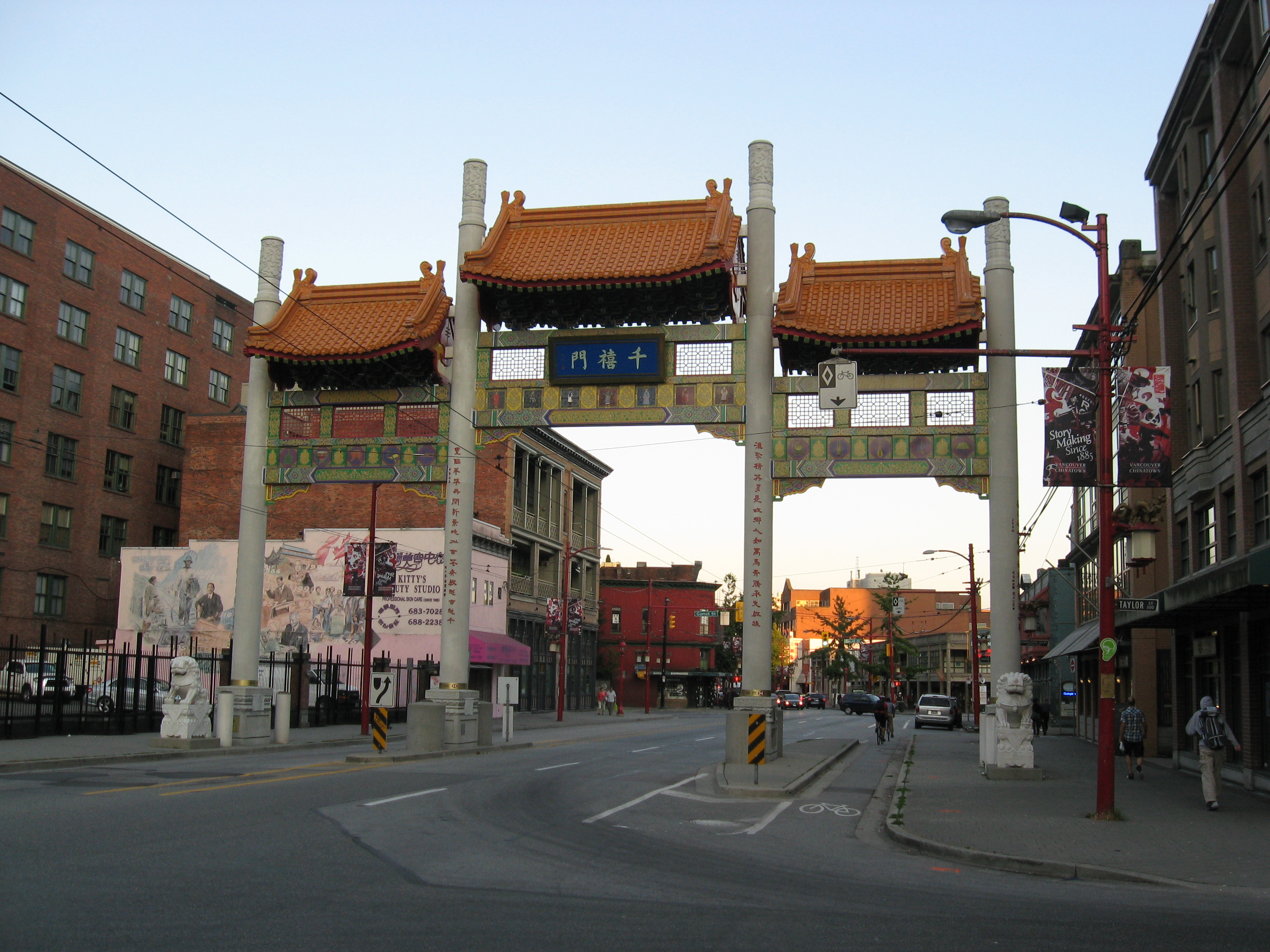
Vancouver Chinatown

As of 2011, there were over 450,000 people of Chinese descent in Greater Vancouver. Vancouver received the title of being, outside of Asia, the "most Asian city" due to its large Chinese population. Vancouver had Chinese residents when the city was founded in 1886. People with origins from Hong Kong "have been especially notable in the flow of international migrants to British Columbia which, for all intents and purposes, has meant the Vancouver region."

Significant Chinese populations are located in all Greater Vancouver neighbourhoods. Richmond, in Greater Vancouver, had more Chinese residents than White Canadian residents in 2013, and has been described as "the most Chinese city in North America."

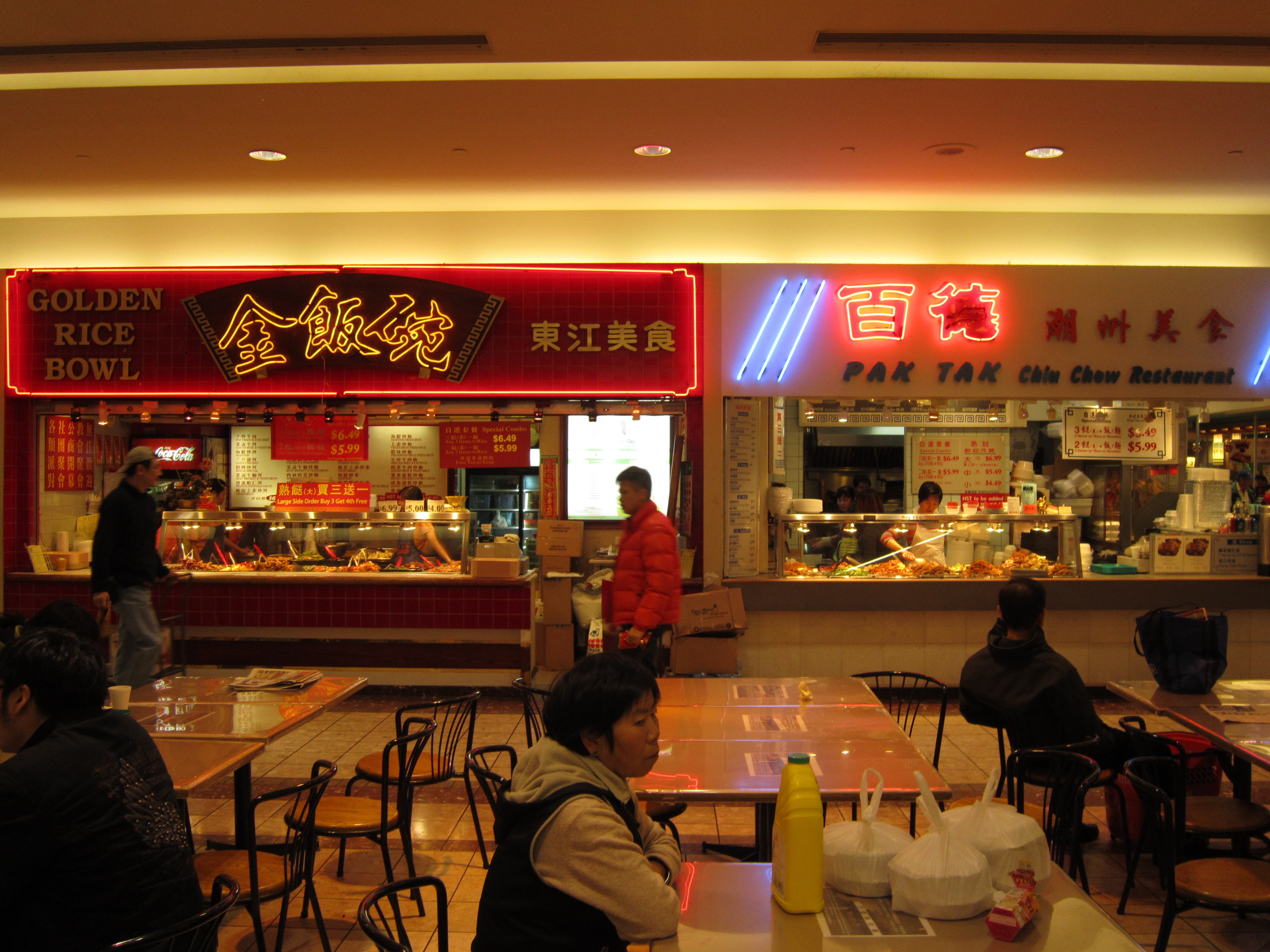
The Yaohan Food Court in Richmond

=== Geography by city ===
There are people of Chinese ethnicity located throughout the city of Vancouver. 40% of the residents of a large portion of Southeast Vancouver are Chinese. The Granville and 49th area within South Vancouver also has a Chinese population. The Vancouver Chinatown is the largest Chinatown in Canada.

In 1981, the vast majority of Chinese in Greater Vancouver lived in the Vancouver city limits. At the time Chinese were concentrated in the East End of Vancouver, namely Chinatown and Strathcona. By the mid-1990s Chinese had moved into Kerrisdale and Shaughnessy. In those communities Chinese built large modern-style housing in place of Neo-Tudor and other style houses from the early 20th century.

Richmond has a high concentration of Chinese. Chinese make up 80% of the residents of the Golden Village area, focussed along No. 3 Road, which contains many Chinese businesses. Douglas Todd of the Vancouver Sun wrote "Richmond remains the most striking bastion of Chinese culture". In 1997, the newly immigrated Chinese in Richmond were stereotyped as being "wealthy 'yacht people'". Richmond had few Chinese in 1981, with most census tracts being fewer than 5% Chinese in composition and with no census tract having over 10% Chinese. By 1986, the proportion of Chinese in Richmond was increasing; in 1986, the city's 8,000 Chinese made up 8.3% of Richmond's total population and 9% of the Vancouver area's Chinese Canadians. By 1991, 16.4% of Richmond's population was Chinese Canadian and 11% was Chinese immigrants. In 1997, Ray, Halseth, and Johnson wrote that "it appears that" new Chinese immigrants were bypassing Vancouver and moving directly to Richmond.

Areas of northern Coquitlam also have Chinese residents, like most other places in the Lower Mainland. The Halifax Street and Kensington Street area of North Burnaby has Chinese residents, like most of Vancouver's neighbourhoods and suburbs.

== Demographics ==
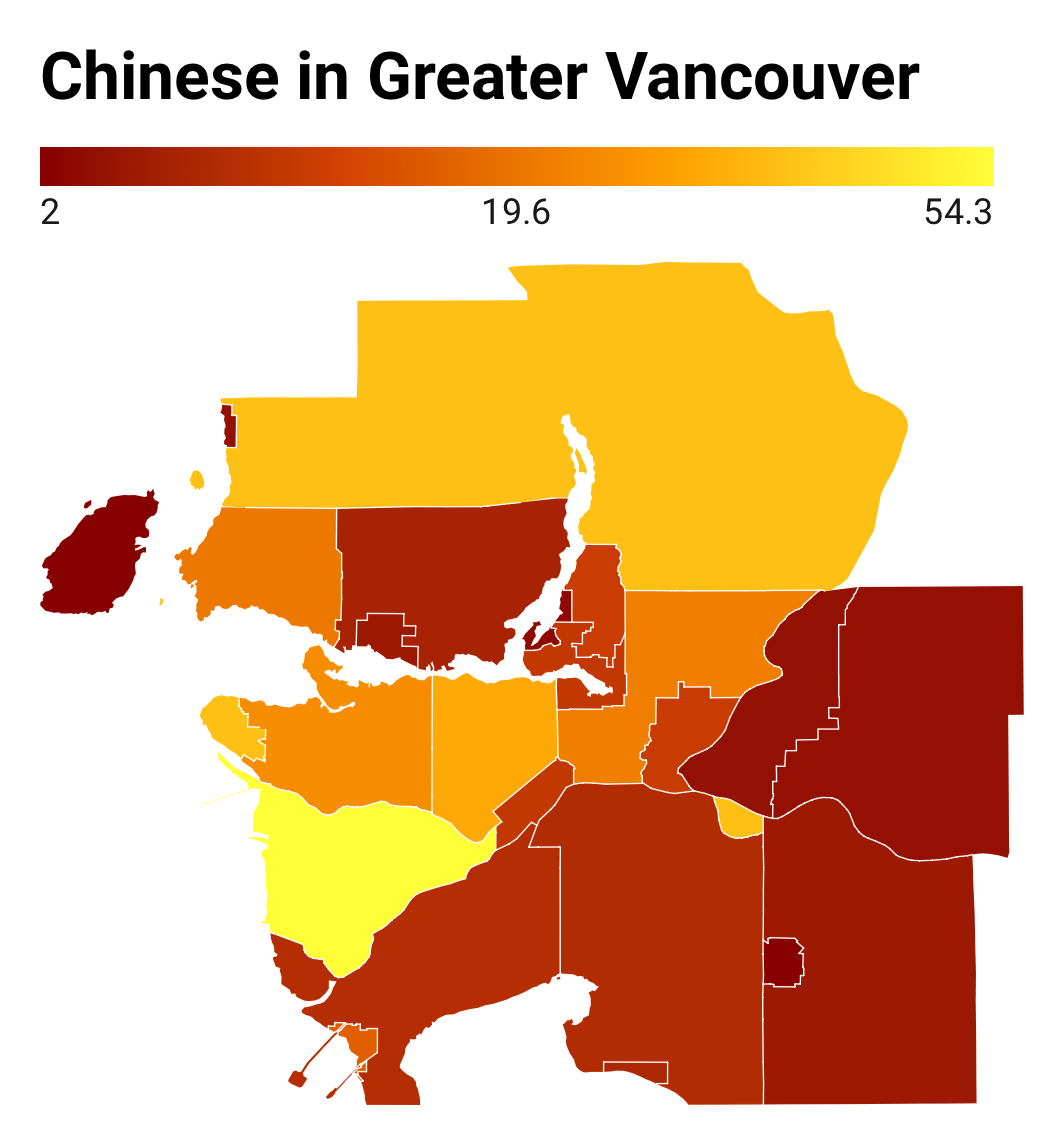
Chinese percent in Greater Vancouver by municipality, 2021 census

In 1964 there were 16,700 ethnic Chinese in the Vancouver area. Cantonese made up the majority, with most of them originating from Siyi. About 50 were Hakka people, and 50-60 were northern Chinese.

In 1992 Vancouver had the second largest Chinese population outside of China, with San Francisco having the largest such population.

In 2006 Statistics Canada stated that there were 381,535 Chinese in the Vancouver metropolitan area, making up 43% of the area's total number of visible minorities. In 2006 there were 396,000 Chinese in Greater Vancouver. That year, according to Statistics Canada data, the numbers of Chinese in Greater Vancouver included 168,210 in the city of Vancouver proper, 75,730 in Richmond, 60,765 in Burnaby, 20,205 in Surrey, 19,580 in Coquitlam, 5,835 in Delta, 3,770 in New Westminster, and 3,360 in West Vancouver.

As of around 2009, about 30% of Vancouver residents had some or more Chinese ancestry, and Chinese ancestry was the most commonly reported out of all of the ancestries.

By 2012 Hong Kong has been overtaken by Mainland China, and to a lesser extent Taiwan, as the main sources of Chinese immigration to Vancouver.

A 2013 study by Dan Hiebert of the University of British Columbia predicted that by 2031 the Chinese population of Vancouver would be 809,000.

By the 2021 Canadian census, Chinese Canadians enumerated 512,260, or 19.38%, of the metropolitan area's total population.

=== Place of origin ===
As of 2011 most Chinese immigrants to British Columbia go to Vancouver, and of the overall provincial Chinese immigration most originate from Mainland China. Historically immigrants came from Hong Kong and to a lesser, extent, Taiwan. The Mainland Chinese government prohibits dual citizenship, while the Hong Kong government allows its permanent residents to also hold citizenships from foreign countries, meaning that previously Hongkongers had had more of an incentive to come to Vancouver compared to Mainlanders.

In the period 1996-2001, according to Canadian census data, the number of persons from Mainland China arriving to Vancouver eclipsed the numbers of Hongkongers; the number of Hongkongers present in Vancouver declined between 1996 and 2006. In 2006 there were 137,245 immigrants from Mainland China in Vancouver, while there were 75,780 Hongkonger immigrants in the same city that year. The Hongkonger immigrant number had declined 12% between 1996 and 2006 with almost all of the decline occurring from 2001 to 2006. From 1996 to 2006, Ian Young of the South China Morning Post wrote "the fall in the number of such immigrants present in the city suggests" that 29,325 Hongkongers left Vancouver while according to the census data 18,890 Hongkongers arrived. Meanwhile, the Mainlander population increased 88% between 1996 and 2006. In 2012 7,872 Mainland Chinese arrived in Vancouver while 286 Hongkongers arrived in the same city. According to Ley, the demographics of immigrants changed because "everyone [from Hong Kong or Taiwan] who wanted a [Canadian] passport got one."

As of 2008 there were 50,000 Taiwanese-origin persons in the Vancouver area.

==== Mainland Chinese ====
By 2011 many Mainland Chinese were settling in Vancouver. Manyee Lui, a realtor quoted in a 2011 Bloomberg article, described this as the "third wave" of Chinese immigration into the city. Cathy Gong, a Vancouver resident originating from Shanghai quoted in the same 2011 Bloomberg article, stated that Mainland Chinese were moving to Vancouver due to the existing Chinese population in addition to the climate, and the perceived high quality of the public schools. Some households of Mainlander origin in Vancouver involve a wife and children living there while the husbands of the households are working in China. In 2013 Young wrote that "Anecdotal evidence suggests mainland Chinese wives commonly stay in Vancouver to provide a citizenship toehold for their absentee husbands." As of 2003 many Mainland immigrants had Mainland credentials in skilled jobs but encountered difficulty in finding employment in their fields with these credentials.

==== Hong Kongers ====
Vancouver received most of the Hong Kongers settling in British Columbia, and out of all of Canada British Columbia had the highest proportion of Hong Kong settlers. Many professionals, spurred by the impending 1997 Handover of Hong Kong and 1980s economic and political issues, immigrated to Vancouver. Therefore, late 20th century Hong Kong immigration had relatively more socioeconomically higher end persons compared to previous waves of Chinese immigration. Hong Kong immigrants perceived Vancouver as a good destination due to a perception of high quality in Canadian schools. As of 2013 several Hong Kong-origin families based in Vancouver are transnational, meaning that members of the family may move between Hong Kong and Vancouver.

== Language ==
Chinese languages have been spoken in Greater Vancouver since the first Chinese immigrants arrived in the area in the 19th century. Today, about 1 in 6 people in Greater Vancouver claim a Chinese language as their mother tongue. Historically, Cantonese had been the dominant Chinese language spoken by the Chinese diaspora in Greater Vancouver, being the language used in the community's radio and television programming. However, recent immigration from Mainland China has brought a significant number of Standard Chinese speakers to the region, and by the 2021 Census the population of Mandarin speakers had overtaken Cantonese speakers. Canada's first Chinese-language newspaper, Wa-Ying Yat-Po (華英日報), was established in Vancouver in 1906.

As of the 2021 census, Mandarin and Cantonese are the second- and fourth-most spoken mother tongues in Greater Vancouver respectively. (English and Punjabi are first and third respectively.) In the city of Richmond more people speak a Chinese language (48.4 percent) as a mother tongue than one of Canada's official languages (37.8 percent). In 2021, 23.2 percent of people in Greater Vancouver describing their ethnic origin as Chinese spoke English as a mother tongue.

Population (and % of population) of people who speak Chinese languages and official languages as a mother tongue in Greater Vancouver (2021 Census)
	Greater Vancouver		City of Vancouver		City of Richmond	
Population	2,619,425		654,825		209,040	
Chinese languages	431,080	(16.5%)	136,795	(20.9%)	101,125	(48.4%)
Mandarin	207,270	(7.9%)	45,610	(7.0%)	47,405	(22.7%)
Cantonese	199,945	(7.6%)	84,240	(12.9%)	48,710	(23.3%)
Min Nan	15,205	(0.6%)	4,040	(0.6%)	3,290	(1.6%)
Wu	3,380	(0.1%)	940	(0.1%)	890	(0.4%)
Hakka	2,365	(0.1%)	775	(0.1%)	400	(0.2%)
Min Dong	185	(0.01%)	70	(0.01%)	35	(0.02%)
Official languages	1,505,670	(57.5%)	377,865	(57.7%)	79,100	(37.8%)
English	1,468,760	(56.1%)	363,820	(55.6%)	77,490	(37.1%)
French	36,910	(1.4%)	14,045	(2.1%)	1,610	(0.8%)

== Institutions ==
Prior to the 1960s many Chinese in Vancouver established associations based on their clan origins and districts in addition to educational and recreational organizations. In 1964 Vancouver had about 80 Chinese associations. As of the 1960s, ad hoc community organizations established by Chinese businesses (Note: jie-fang Chinese Chinese: 街坊; pinyin: jiēfāng, Cantonese: kaai-fong) existed in Chinese communities which did not have their own full-fledged community associations.

By the 1960s and 1970s older voluntary associations were unable to properly assist or connect with new immigrants coming from Hong Kong, and so they declined in influence and popularity. A new wave of Chinese Canadian organizations opened around the 1970s and 1980s. The newly arrived Hong Kong immigrants began participating in those ones, and the people leading the new organizations tended to be Hong Kongers. Graham E. Johnson, the author of "Hong Kong Immigration and the Chinese Community in Vancouver", wrote that older organizations were "flourishing" at that time.

=== Benevolent associations and other community associations ===
The benevolent associations were established to represent the Chinese community as a whole.

The Chinese Benevolent Association of Vancouver (CBA), as of 2006, has 2,000 members and serves as a federation of various Vancouver-based Chinese organizations. Douglas Aitken of The Georgia Straight stated that the CBA was the most important organization operating in the Vancouver Chinatown in the first half of the 20th century. The Vancouver Sun wrote "They were, for all intents and purposes, the government of Chinatown." It was first established in 1896, and it was registered as a nonprofit organization ten years later.

The Chinese Benevolent Association of Canada (CBAC), as of 1991; had 600 persons, mostly Taiwanese immigrants, as members; and represented 11 groups. It separated from the CBA in 1979. The CBAC is headquartered in Vancouver and it maintains branches in other Canadian cities. It funds the Overseas Chinese Public School, which gives Mandarin classes; provides minor arbitration services; and provides activities and entertainment catering to the Chinese community.

The Ming Sun Benevolent Association has its offices in 441 Powell, a Japantown structure which dates to 1891 and had a front section added in 1902 by the Uchida family. In 2010 the city government declared April 24 as "Ming Sun Benevolent Association Day". In 2013 the city government began efforts to force the demolition of 441 Powell.

=== Clan associations ===
Clan associations such as the Lim Society, Mah Society, and the Wing Society were established by the early 20th Century. The associations brought together Chinese persons who held the same Chinese family name. There were 26 clan associations in Vancouver in 1923, and that number increased to 46 by 1937.

In 1964 there were about 23 clan associations in the Vancouver area. That year the clan associations had established three reading rooms. The Hong Kong immigrants of the mid-20th century did not join the clan associations. In 2008 there were eleven clan associations active in the Vancouver Chinatown, and they continued holding meetings and events there; that year they owned a total of twelve buildings in Chinatown. The Vancouver Sun wrote in 2008 that many of the buildings were in poor condition, though the 1903 Lim Society building and the Mah Society building remained in good conditions. That year the eleven clan associations formed the Chinatown Society Heritage Buildings Association to facilitate the renovations of the clan association buildings.

Wong's Benevolent Association, which accepts persons with the family name Wong, opened in 1911. It operates the Hon Hsing Athletic Group, which performs lion dances; engages in political concerns; and operates the Mon Keang School, the sole North American Chinese school operated by a clan association. In 1991 it had 700 members.

=== Cultural centres ===
The Chinese Cultural Centre of Greater Vancouver (CCC) is located in Vancouver's Chinatown, where it manages cultural, recreational, and training programs. Members of a 1973 conference held at Wong's Benevolent Association in the Vancouver Chinatown decided to establish a cultural centre. 21 people joined the cultural centre building committee, and the CCC was registered in 1974. It moved into a permanent building in September 1980. In 1991, it had 40 program training teachers and 16 administrative employees. Its programs include language training, arts classes, language classes, and the Spring Festival celebration.

The Sun Yat-sen Classical Garden Society is in operation in Vancouver. The purpose of the society was to raise funds to complete the Sun Yat-sen Classical Garden.

=== Fraternal associations ===
The fraternal associations defined political factions, ran activities, established clubrooms, and printed newspapers. The Vancouver Chinese Freemasons (VCF), a local chapter of the Chinese Freemasons founded in 1888, and the Kuomintang were the two primary fraternal associations in Vancouver as of 1964. As of 1991 the VCF had over 3,000 members. The Freemasons chapter founded the oldest Chinese newspaper in Canada, the Chinese Times, in 1907. The VCF established the 81 unit Chinese Freemasons' Senior Building, which houses elderly persons, and the Chinese Freemasons Athletic Club, which has athletic activities.

=== Locality associations ===
There were huiguan locality associations that provided welfare to persons from their particular places of origin. In 1964 the Vancouver area had such associations for the six places in Guangdong where most Chinese Vancouverites originated from: Enping, Kaiping, Panyu, Taishan, Xinhui, and Zhongshan. In 1898 Vancouver had at least ten locality associations. The number of locality associations in Vancouver was 12 in 1923 and 17 in 1937. The Hong Kong immigrants of the mid-20th century did not join the locality associations.

=== Social services organizations ===
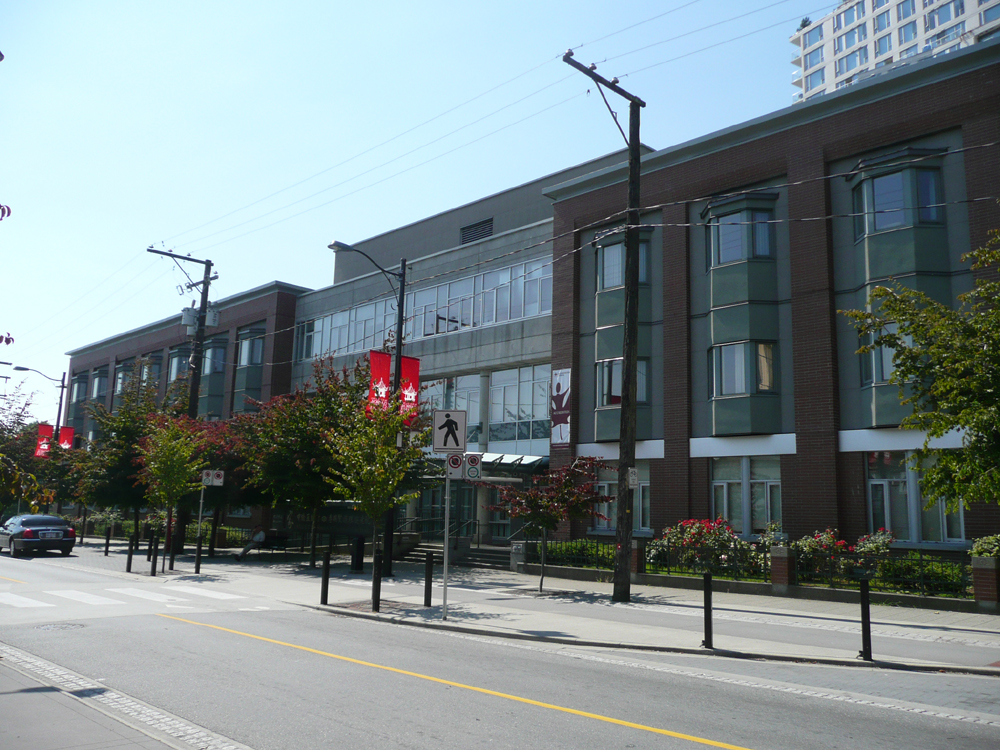
The SUCCESS Simon K.Y. Lee Seniors Care Home in Chinatown, Vancouver

The first organization to provide social services to the Hong Kong immigrants of the mid-20th century was the Young Women's Christian Association (YWCA) or the "Pender Y," located in Chinatown at the intersection of Dunlevy Street and Pender Street. The Pender Y initially provided adequate services but became overwhelmed. Prior to the founding of Chinese-established groups it established a job skills program, distributed information about essential services in Cantonese and English, and provided counseling. Hong Kong immigrants were attracted to the YWCA because they had patronized the YWCAs that had been established in Hong Kong.

In 1973 the organization S.U.C.C.E.S.S., a loose acronym for the United Chinese Community Enrichment Services Society, was founded to provide social services for Chinese, including recent immigrants. It was founded by several persons of Hong Kong origin, including Maggie Ip, who became the first chairperson, Jonathan Lau, Linda Leong, Mei-Chan Lin, and Pauline To. As of 2003, it had 350 employees, a headquarters in Vancouver, and 11 other offices in the Greater Vancouver region. As of the same year its budget is $16 million. The organization from 2006 until 2010 was headed by CEO Tung Chan, a former Vancouver city councillor.

In 1992 the Vancouver Association of Chinese Canadians (VACC; traditional Chinese: 溫哥華華裔加人協會; simplified Chinese: 温哥华华裔加人协会; pinyin: Wēngēhuá Huáyì Jiārén Xiéhuì; Jyutping: wan1 go1 waa4 waa4 jeoi6 gaa1 jan4 hip3 wui6*2) formed. It advocated in favour of Chinese people who claimed refugee status after entering Canada. Victor Wong served as the executive director. In the summer of 1999 599 persons arrived in a boat, and the VACC became involved in this case.

=== Other associations ===
The Chinese Consumers' Association of Vancouver (CCAV) mediates disputes between retail businesses and their customers. The CCAV was established in 1986. As of 1991 it was headed by an immigrant and University of British Columbia graduate from Hong Kong and had over 200 members.

Several organizations in Vancouver had specific purposes. The Chinese community established gambling societies, music societies, and youth clubs. Prior to 1994 Chinese "music societies" in Vancouver, first founded in the 1920s, had an increase in popularity.

== Commerce ==
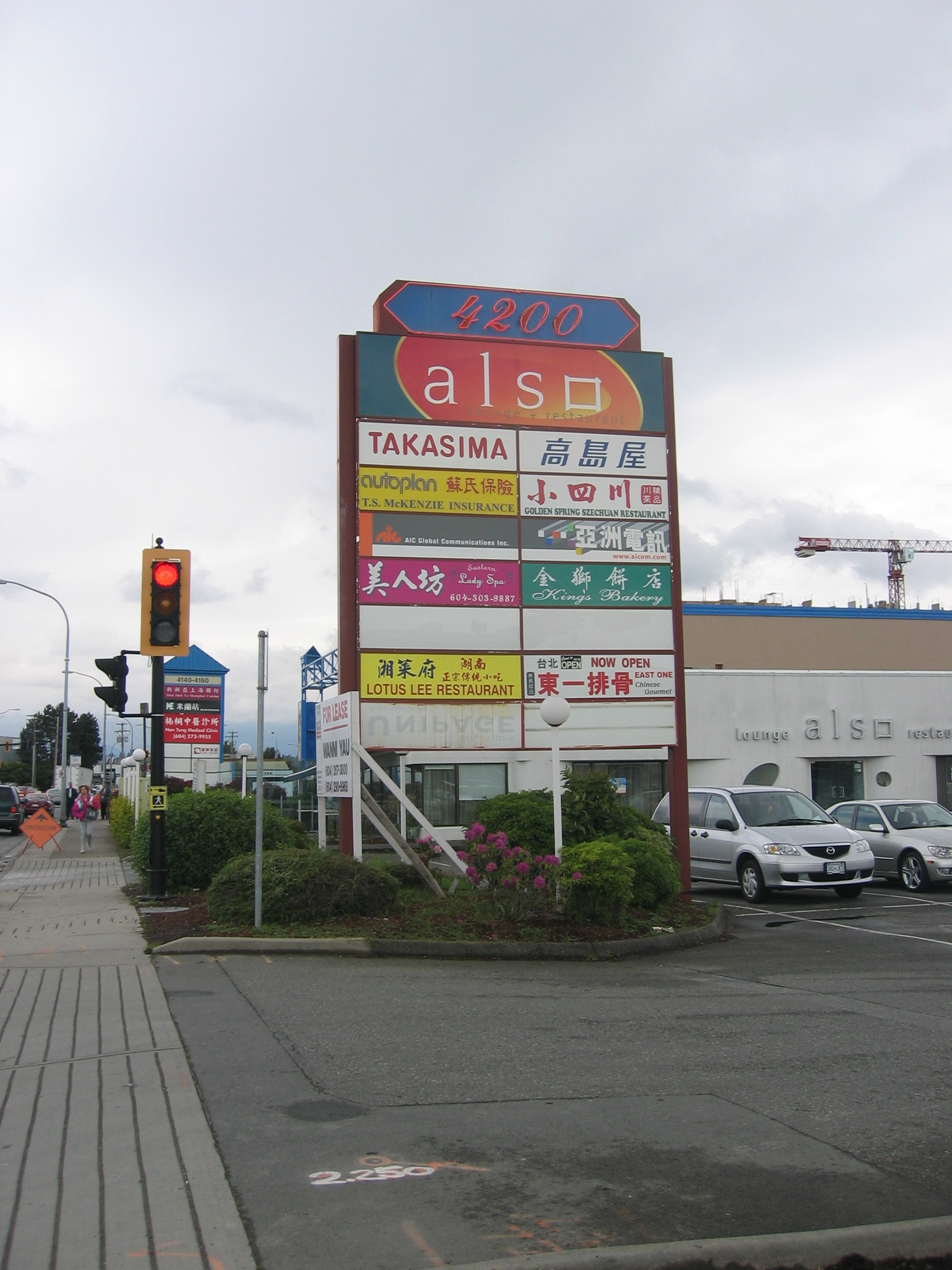
Chinese-catering businesses in Richmond

=== Restaurants ===
Chinese restaurants in Vancouver have become popular with both ethnic Chinese and non-ethnic Chinese in the city. As of 2011 most of the restaurants serve Cantonese cuisine.

By the 1980s Cantonese-style restaurants began appearing in Vancouver as an influx of Hong Kongers came there. Hot pot restaurants became very popular in the 1990s. The use of British Columbian seafood and the presence of star chefs from Hong Kong gave Vancouver's Chinese restaurant scene a reputation for quality, and the variety of Chinese cuisines that already existed in Hong Kong due to its history of receiving transplants from other parts of China was duplicated in Vancouver. As of 2011 Richmond has multiple Chinese restaurants, most of which served Cantonese cuisine, with a customer base almost fully ethnic Chinese; that year Mia Stainsby of the Vancouver Sun wrote that the city had the "mother lode" of Chinese restaurants and "Some say we have the best Chinese food in the world." Growth of non-Cantonese restaurants in Richmond occurred due to a post-1997 influx of Mainland Chinese.

The Chinese Restaurant Awards (CRA; traditional Chinese: 中國食肆大獎; simplified Chinese: 中国食肆大奖; pinyin: Zhōngguó Shísì Dàjiǎng; Jyutping: zung1 gwok3 sik6 si3 daai6 zoeng2), co-founded by Stephen Wong and Craig Stowe, now run by Rae Kung (About the Awards). Chinese Restaurant Awards regularly ranks Chinese restaurants and displays its rankings on its website. It holds the Critics' Choice Signature Dish Awards, Food Bloggers' Choice Awards and the public voting Diners' Choice Awards. Stainsby described the awards as "the vox populi of Chinese food in Metro Vancouver", and that overall CRA is "the go-to guide to Chinese food in Metro Vancouver for locals and tourists alike."

=== Shopping malls ===
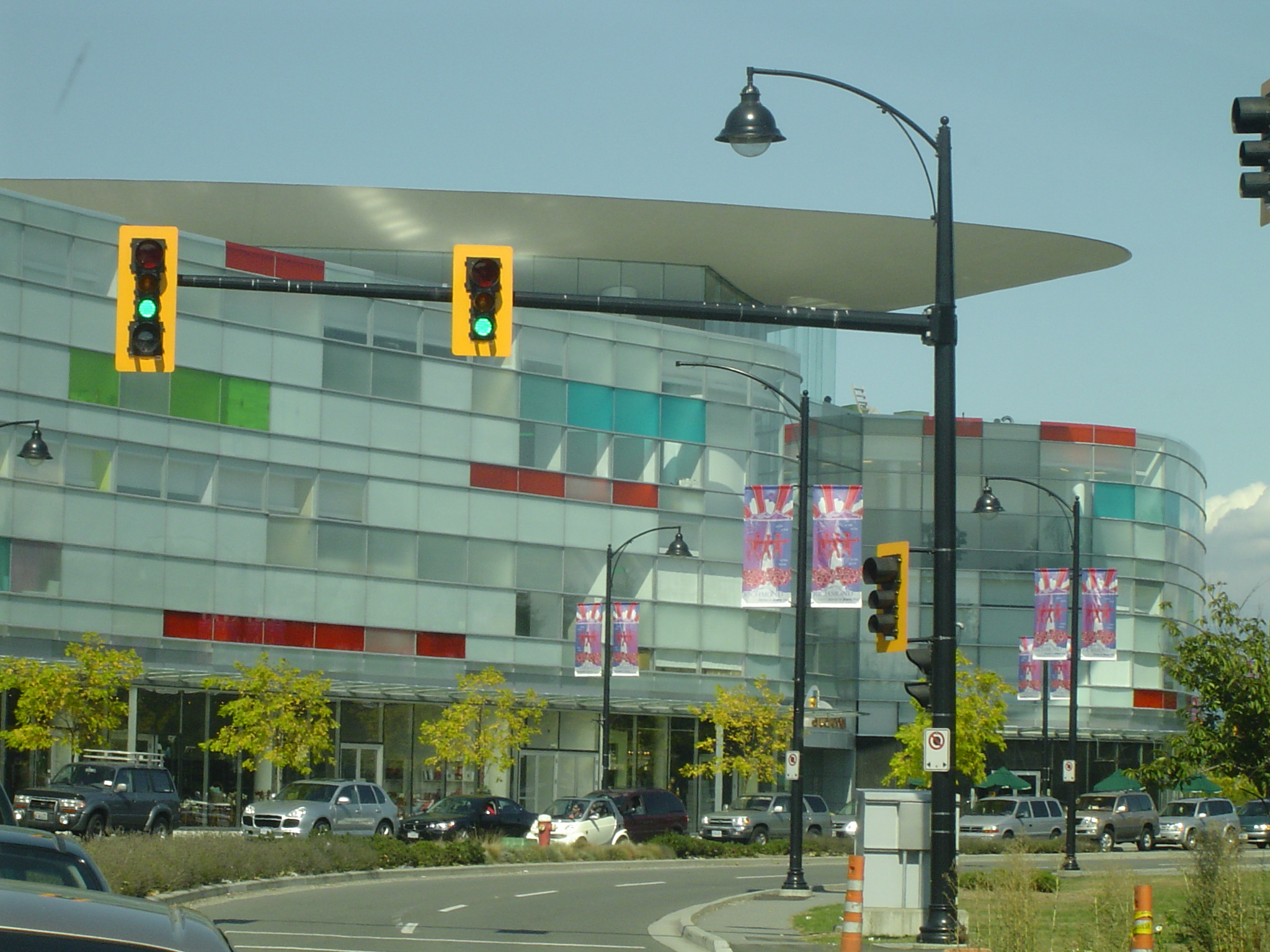
Aberdeen Centre

Several large shopping centres in Greater Vancouver were developed to serve the Chinese Canadian community. Many malls which contain businesses catering to Chinese speakers are concentrated in Richmond, though common throughout Vancouver and in many of its suburbs, particularly near Coquitlam Town Centre and in the Metrotown Town Centre area of Burnaby. Construction of such malls in the metropolitan area began in the late 1980s. Aberdeen Centre in Richmond, the first large ethnic Chinese-oriented shopping centre in the Vancouver area, opened in 1989. Ethnic Chinese and Asian shopping centres in Richmond that were built after Aberdeen Centre include Continental Centre, Cosmo Plaza, Pacific Plaza, Parker Place, and Yaohan Centre. Other Chinese and Asian shopping centres in the Vancouver area include Burnaby's Crystal Mall, Coquitlam's Henderson Place Mall, and Surrey's Canada Asian Centre.

As of 1999 relatively few Caucasian persons shop at the Richmond centres. The Richmond centres adopted English signage and asked individual stores to hire English-speaking employees and use English signage after municipal officials held meetings with the ethnic Chinese business community; this occurred due to complaints from longtime English-speaking residents. Even with English signage, some English-speakers encounter difficulties since some salespersons do not have sufficient English comprehension. Some non-Chinese felt discomfort in the shopping centres and had the perception that they were discriminated against. Jun Nan, the author of the master's of science thesis Immigration and Integration: The Development of `Chinese' Shopping Centres in the Suburbs of Vancouver, wrote that the Chinese signage was one of the commonly cited rationales for the perceptions, and that the existence of English signage in the same centres shows that an inability to read Chinese is not the root cause of the objection to the Chinese signs. Nan also stated that non-Chinese also objected to the Chinese-oriented merchandise and to unfriendly attitudes given towards them.

=== Supermarkets ===
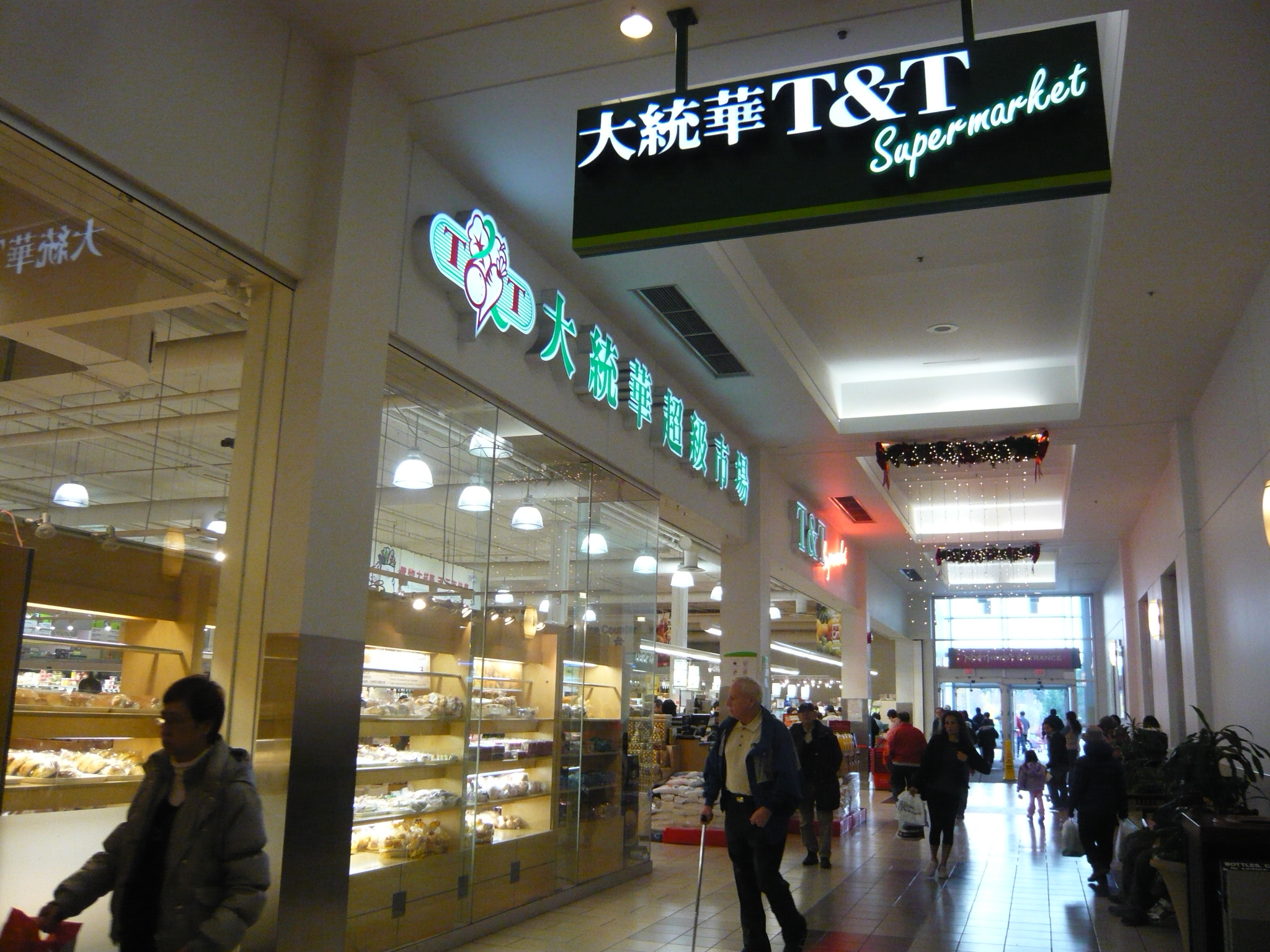
A T & T Supermarket in Coquitlam

Due to the increase of Chinese in Vancouver, by 1994 many Vancouver supermarkets sold Chinese food items, and ethnic Chinese and non-ethnic Chinese purchased these items. T & T Supermarket was established in 1993 by Cindy Lee and her husband Jack. T&T became the largest Asian supermarket chain in Canada. As of 2009 of it has eight stores in the Vancouver area.

=== Transportation ===
Air services to China were established as traffic between Canada and China, including immigration, increased. In 1987 Air China established Vancouver operations. It was one of the first Mainland Chinese companies to have operations in British Columbia, and its presence prompted other Mainland Chinese airlines to follow, including China Eastern Airlines, China Southern Airlines, and Sichuan Airlines. China Southern was scheduled to begin service to Guangzhou from Vancouver on June 15, 2011, establishing Canada's first nonstop flights to that city. Sichuan Airlines's flight serves Shenyang and Chengdu. As of July 2014 there are 72 weekly direct flights between Vancouver and China. Beijing Capital Airlines is scheduled to begin services between Vancouver and Qingdao and Hangzhou on December 30, 2016.

Air Canada operates its own services from Vancouver to Beijing, Hong Kong, and Shanghai. Cathay Pacific provides services to Hong Kong, and China Airlines and EVA Air provide services to Taipei.

== Media ==
As of 2009, of all of the major ethnic categories in Vancouver the Chinese had the secondary highest number of media products.

Fairchild Group operates Fairchild TV and Talentvision.

Four Chinese-language daily newspapers, Ming Pao, Sing Tao, World Journal, and Rise Weekly cater to the city's large Cantonese and Mandarin speaking population.

The Vancouver Sun operates Taiyangbao (simplified Chinese: 太阳报; traditional Chinese: 太陽報; pinyin: Tàiyáng Bào), a Mandarin version of their regular newspaper. The English-language edition of the Epoch Times, a global newspaper founded by Chinese emigres, is distributed through free boxes throughout the metropolis.

The Truth Monthly (traditional Chinese: 真理報; simplified Chinese: 真理报; pinyin: Zhēnlǐ Bào), a Christian newspaper, is in Vancouver.

=== Historical media ===
One of Canada's first Chinese newspapers, the Chinese Reform Gazette (traditional Chinese: 日薪報; simplified Chinese: 日薪报; Jyutping: jat6 san1 bou3; pinyin: Rìxīnbào, Cantonese name also spelled as Yat Sun Bo, "Daily News"), was published by the Vancouver branch of the Chinese Empire Reform Association and argued in favour of Kang Youwei's ideas of governance. Two other major newspapers were published by reformist groups of the early 1900s. The Wah Ying Yat Bo ("Chinese English Daily News"), an English-Chinese bilingual paper, was founded by Christians and acquired by the Cheekongtong, which then founded the Tai Hon Bo in 1907. In 1908 the Wah Ying Yat Bo was disestablished.

The Dai Luk Bo ("Mainland Times") began publication in 1908 in Vancouver, advocated in favour of revolution in China, and was disestablished the following year. The Tai Hon Bo began taking a pro-Sun Yat-sen stance after Sun Yat-sen follower Feng Tzu-yu took the position of editor at that publication. The newspapers of the Cheekongtong and the Rixin Bao were in conflict with each other by the late 1900s and early 1910s; the former asked for revolution while the latter asked for reform without revolution. A revolution in China occurred in 1911. The Tai Hon Bo was, in 1914, renamed Tai Hon Kung Go ("Chinese Times"). In the 1970s Tai Hon Kung Bo was still in operation.

The Chinatown News, a biweekly, English-language paper, was a newspaper established by Chinese born in Canada, or tusheng. The founder was Roy Mah, who served as its editor. The paper focused on Canadian politics and events and did not focus on intra-Chinese political conflicts. Instead its focus was on things of interest to Canadian-born Chinese, and the paper often favoured the tusheng in conflicts they had with newly arrived Chinese. It ran until 1995. The Chinese News Weekly and New Citizen were also established by locally born Chinese, in 1936 and 1949, respectively, but closed after short durations of operation.

The Canada Morning News (Jianada Zhongguo Chenbao) was a Kuomintang newspaper that had a leftist persuasion.

The Da Zhong Bao was opened in February 1961. It was published by the Chinese Youth Association. It was originally bimonthly but it later shifted into being a weekly paper. There was an English version published in the Fall of 1970. Four issues were made in the CYA's attempt to spread messages to tusheng.

Other historical Chinese-language papers in Vancouver include the Chinese Times, Chinese Voice, and New Republic.

== Politics ==
=== Politics in the City of Vancouver ===
As of around 2005 12% of the Vancouver-based politicians had some Chinese ancestry. This formed a 0.40 index of proportionality in relation to the city's overall population of those with Chinese ancestry.

When Vancouver was founded in 1886, its charter stated that municipal elections would not have First Nations and Chinese voters. R. H. Alexander, the operator of the Hastings Mill, asked his Chinese employees to vote anyway but they were chased away from the polls by whites. These men were supporters of David Oppenheimer, a rival candidate who was to become the city's second mayor. Alexander, at the time, was making an unsuccessful bid for the Mayor of Vancouver. Around 1900 the City of Vancouver barred Chinese from voting. This along with the provincial ban on voting left Vancouver's Chinese unable to meaningfully participate in Canadian politics.

On July 24, 1899, several area merchants, including Won Alexander Cumyow, Charley Yip Yen, Chen Cai, and Huang Yushan, established the Vancouver branch of the Chinese Empire Reform Association (CERA (Note: In Chinese: 保救大清光緒皇帝會 Bǎo Jiù Dà Qīng Guāngxù Huángdì Huì "Protecting and Saving Great Manchu Guangxu Emperor Association", or Baohuanghui 保皇會 Bǎo Huáng Huì in short))), an organization asking for reform of the Chinese political system. The organizations' name changed to Constitutional Party (Note: In Chinese: Digu Xianzhengdang)) in 1906. The Cheekongtong, which advocated for reform of the Chinese political system without revolution, competed with political organizations that called for revolution in China. Political developments occurred in China around the 1911 Chinese Revolution, and therefore political activity related to China occurred in the Vancouver Chinatown. Members of the Chinese community helped fund the revolution. As Vancouver's Chinese population grew in size, Chinese political activity in the province became centred in Vancouver.

In the post-revolution period the Cheekongtong renamed themselves the Freemasons. The Freemasons, which had contributed money to the revolution but was not given favours by the Kuomintang, competed with the KMT's Canadian subsidiary, Chinese Nationalist League for political influence, including control of the Vancouver CBA. The Freemasons allied with the Constitutional Party. The KMT and Freemasons continued to be in conflict until the 1970s.

Chinese newspapers in the Vancouver region, during the 1960s and December 1970 began asking for their readers to participate in elections. In the Vancouver municipal elections in 1968 and 1970 three Chinese candidates each ran for election. In both Chinese candidates did not succeed in being elected.

By 1985 the City of Vancouver had a Chinese alderman. Bill Yee, the second visible minority ever on the Vancouver City Council, was elected in 1982, with Sandra Wilking elected to council in 1988; as the first Chinese Canadian woman to hold an elected position in the city's government. By 1994 Chinese politicians have run for and been elected in many political campaigns in the Vancouver area. Most of these politicians were of Hong Kong origins. Since the 1980s and as of 2009 Vancouver City Council has consistently had Chinese members.

By the 1990s white residents of some Vancouver neighbourhoods criticized Chinese for demolishing older houses and building larger, newer houses in their place. Existing White Canadians and others in the affected neighbourhoods perceived the Chinese and their new houses as being "an assault on traditional meanings associated with suburbia."

During a failed 2004 election proposal to reinstitute the ward system in the City of Vancouver, the heavily Chinese southeast Vancouver voted in "clear opposition" against the measure. The at-large voting system used by Vancouver makes it difficult to elect women and minorities, and that the council's majority White Canadian demographics were "probably" influenced by the original rationale of the at-large system, to "keep those with social democratic ideologies out of politics". The ward system was abolished in 1935.

In 2014 the City of Vancouver enacted a grant program to preserve Chinese tong buildings in Vancouver's Chinatown and in the adjacent Downtown Eastside areas.

In 2022, Ken Sim defeated the incumbent mayor Kennedy Stewart in Vancouver municipal election, making him the first Chinese Canadian mayor of Vancouver.

=== Politics in other Greater Vancouver cities ===
In 2001 the Richmond Canadian Voters submitted three candidates for the Richmond City Council, including two Chinese, but none won seats. The public perceived the party as being "Chinese" "due to its leadership and conservative positions on group homes and liberal public education".

In 2013 Kerry Starchuk wrote a petition arguing that Chinese-only signs were a problem in Richmond; it was submitted to the city council by two people with over 1,000 signatures. The City Council responded by ignoring the petition; at the time the city councillors, in addition to mayor Malcolm Brodie, were White people who spoke English. In a 2013 editorial in the National Post Chris Selley argued that the city council was correct in ignoring the petition, citing the United States's lack of compulsory language sign laws. By 2014 the city council had changed its position and was exploring options on how to ban Chinese-only signs. At the time several non-Chinese in Richmond argued that having Chinese signs without English was exclusionary to people who are not Chinese. That year Tristin Hopper of the National Post wrote that "Nobody will dispute that the number of Chinese-only signs in Richmond is increasing, but the vast majority still feature English text."

By 2014 the group Putting Canada First, which criticizes having Chinese-language signs in Greater Vancouver, was established. That year, its spokesperson, North Vancouver resident Brad Saltzberg, wrote a letter arguing against having Chinese language signs to the city council of West Vancouver. The Mayor of West Vancouver, Michael Smith, criticized the movement.

In 2009 there were plans to build a new high school facility in New Westminster on top of a Chinese cemetery. The group Canadians for Reconciliation Society demanded an investigation into the past treatment of New Westminster's Chinese community, such as the exclusion of Chinese students from New Westminster public schools in 1911. In 2010 the city council of New Westminster voted to publicly apologize for past wrongdoings against the Chinese community in the English and Chinese languages, acknowledge publicly these wrongdoings, and discuss the development of a museum exhibit about the historical city government treatment of ethnic Chinese. Mayor of New Westminster Wayne Wright spoke, and another person translated his statements into Mandarin. The Chinese were prevented from voting in municipal elections in 1908. Bill Chu, the head of the Canadians for Reconciliation Society, had taken efforts to get the New Westminster city government to make the apology.

=== Federal politics ===
In 1957 Douglas Jung, from Vancouver, was first elected to the Parliament of Canada; he was the first Chinese Canadian to serve on the parliament. In 1962 Jung lost his election. Art Lee, also from Vancouver and elected in 1974, was the second Chinese Canadian in Parliament.

According to boundaries drawn in 1984, there were two Vancouver-area ridings with over 20% of their populations each being Chinese: Vancouver East, which was 23.9% Chinese, and Vancouver Kingsway, which was 24.6% Chinese. That year, Vancouver South was 17.8% Chinese and Vancouver Quadra was 11.2% Chinese. In 1988 the ridings were redrawn. The Vancouver East riding's Chinese population was 25.4%, making it the only riding that was over 20% Chinese. The Chinese population of the Vancouver South riding was 19.7%.

In 2010 Gabriel Yiu, a New Democratic Party (NDP) candidate for a 2009 BC election, accused candidate Kash Heed, his political rival, of distributing illegal anti-NDP pamphlets to Chinese in the Vancouver-Fraserview riding. Heed was the winner of that election.

=== Housing prices ===
==== Late 1980s/early 1990s housing prices ====
Real estate prices rose in Vancouver in the mid-1980s as the influx of Hong Kongers came. Many of the new immigrants destroyed older houses and built new ones in their places. In response several Canadians formed a lobby to oppose the new large houses and restrict urban development.

Gregory Schwann wrote the 1989 report When did you move to Vancouver? which stated that there was more migration to Vancouver from British Columbia and other parts of Canada than immigration, and that immigration had declined in the period 1976 through 1986, according to Canadian Department of Employment and Immigration statistics. The Laurier Institute published this report. W. T. Stanbury and John Todd, who wrote the report The Housing Crisis: The Effects of Local Government Regulation, stated that immigration had increased in the period 1987 through 1989 and that there were significant numbers of Hong Kong immigrants who bought large houses; This report cited statistics from the British Columbia Ministry of Finance and Corporate Relations. The Stanbury and Todd report was also published by the Laurier Institute, in January 1990.

==== 2010s housing prices ====
As of 2014 recent Chinese immigrants coming to Metro Vancouver are 96% of the total Chinese recent immigrants to the entire province. As of that year there was a trend of wealthy Mainland Chinese entering Vancouver. 29,764 wealthy Chinese, the majority of Mainland Chinese, entered British Columbia under the Immigrant Investor Programme (IIP), the Canadian wealthy investor immigration program, from 2005 to 2012. Vancouver was the intended destination of many of the IIP applicants. The applications were frozen because of the immense popularity. As of January 2013 there was a backlog of 45,800 Chinese intending to enter British Columbia using the IIP.

By 2011 these wealthy Mainland Chinese investors were buying property in Vancouver, with the westside of Vancouver, including Dunbar, Point Grey, and Shaughnessy, being the primary focus. Many of the new buyers chose to destroy earlier houses originating from the 1940s and 1950s instead of renovating them, and in their places newer houses in the Georgian and Villa styles were constructed. By November 2015 an academic study was released stating that Chinese investors bought about 70% of free-standing houses on the west side of Vancouver in a six-month period.

Some existing members of the Vancouver community, including Chinese, criticized the new investors, arguing that they were driving up housing prices. In 2010 the Canada's Frontier Centre for Public Policy stated that Vancouver was the English-speaking city with the third highest housing prices, and that its housing was more expensive than that of New York City, London, and San Francisco. As of 2013 Demographia Research ranked Vancouver as being the second-most expensive city in the world, after Hong Kong. The organization ranked 350 cities in the world. Ayesha Bhatty of the BBC wrote that "experts say there's little evidence to back up the fears." Mayor of Vancouver Gregor Robertson has made differing statements on whether or not the Chinese buyers are affecting housing prices.

Many critics of the rising housing prices have received accusations of racism. David Wong, an activist in the Vancouver Chinatown, criticized the racism labeling as it may prevent people from having an honest discussion about the issue.

The BC provincial government has stated the a total of $5 billion of laundered money from China had been used to purchase real estate in BC raising the prices of Greater Vancouver home prices by up to 5%. For the past 5 years from 2012 to 2017, Vancouver housing prices surged 60 percent.

=== LGBT issues ===
There have been efforts by several ethnic Chinese groups in Greater Vancouver - many evangelical Christians - to end pro-LGBT policies and programs enacted by school districts and Christian churches. Douglass Todd of the Vancouver Sun wrote that LGBT "may be the most distressing" of the sociocultural issues involving Chinese Christians in the area. In 2014 the Vancouver School Board had proposed a transgender rights program. In response, several Chinese-Canadian Christian groups and organizations, including Truth Monthly, protested the proposal. There were also Chinese Christian efforts to discontinue Burnaby Public Schools anti-homophobia programs. In addition two Chinese congregations of the Anglican diocese of New Westminster chose to leave the diocese due to its support of same-sex marriage, and other Chinese congregations protested against this acceptance.

Justin K. H. Tse (traditional Chinese: 謝堅恆; simplified Chinese: 谢坚恒; Jyutping: ze6 gin1 gin1; pinyin: Xiè Jiānhéng), who wrote a master's degree thesis on Chinese Christian public engagement in Vancouver and two other cities, mentioned that not all Chinese Christians have politically conservative beliefs. In addition, many ethnic Chinese in British Columbia identify as LGBT.

== Education ==
In 2007, there are significant Chinese populations are located in all Greater Vancouver school districts.

Vancouver School Board (VSB) schools are all integrated, with many school populations now predominantly Chinese-ethnic in composition. Private schools are also integrated, whether privately chartered or Catholic church-run. Chinese-language courses are available in most schools, and are popular with non-Chinese students, although regular curriculum instruction is in English. The VSB has basic courses in Cantonese.

In 1998 a group of parents of Chinese origins asked the VSB to establish a new school. The school board opted not to establish the school. The requested school would have used school uniforms, assigned more homework than other public schools, and, in the words of Paul Yee, author of Saltwater City: Story of Vancouver's Chinese Community, "bring in discipline" and "back-to-basics subjects".

As of 2012 there are Chinese-language schools in Vancouver that teach both Mandarin and Cantonese languages. In the 1980s and 1990s Cantonese was, in almost all Chinese-language schools in the city, the only variety taught.

The University of British Columbia has a continuing studies Mandarin program. Vancouver Community College has introductory Cantonese courses. Langara College has continuing studies Cantonese classes for adults and Mandarin classes for children.

Most principals of Vancouver public schools circa the 1920s did not feel that it was necessary to segregate Chinese students from non-Chinese, therefore segregation was not a common occurrence in Vancouver public schools. The Vancouver CBA made efforts to dissuade school administrations from segregating Chinese students.

The Chinese Patriotic School, established by the Empire Reform Association, was Vancouver's first Chinese school. In the early 20th century, the Chinese-language schools in Vancouver were the Wenhua Xuexiao, the Chinese Public School of Vancouver, the Jinhua School, the Kwong Chi School, the Canton School (Guangdong Xuexiao), and two other schools. There was also the Oi-kwok Hok-tong School in New Westminster. Several supplementary schools teaching the Chinese language had been established in the Vancouver area by the 1920s and 1930s, with the number being eleven at one point in time.

== Religion ==
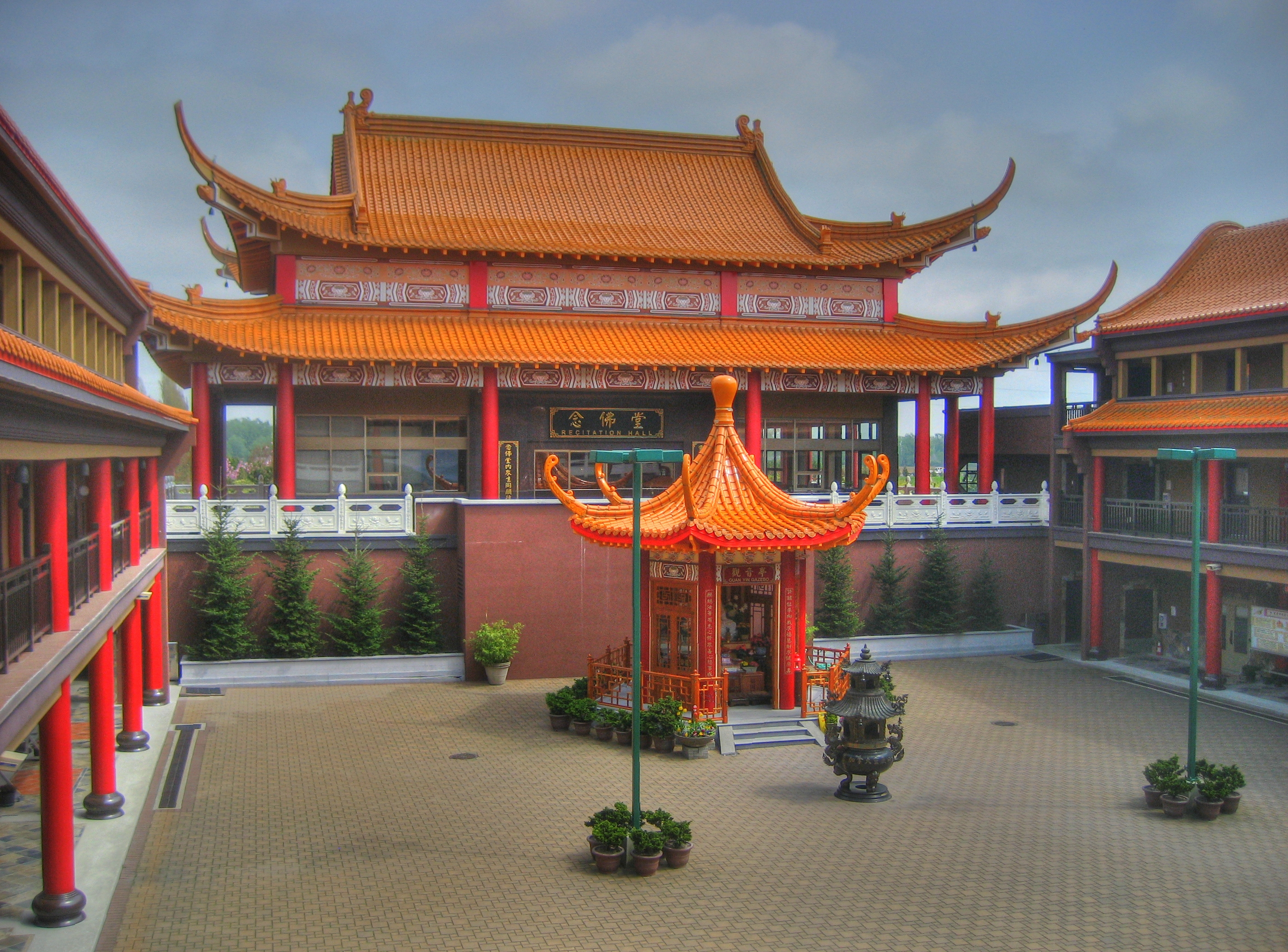
Buddhist temple in Richmond

As of 2011 over 100,000 of the Chinese in Greater Vancouver were Christian, making up about 24% of the total population. 14% of the total population of Greater Vancouver's Chinese stated that they were Buddhist.

Greater Vancouver has Chinese Protestant and Chinese Catholic churches. As of 2013 there are about 120 Chinese churches in the area. Of the Protestant churches there are over 110 in the area. Church services are held in Cantonese, English, and Mandarin.

There are over 26 Chinese Christian organizations in Greater Vancouver. They include theological organizations, radio stations, magazines, and newspapers.

== Culture and recreation ==
The first recording of Cantonese opera occurred in Vancouver in 1898.

The Chinese New Year Parade is held every year in Vancouver. Many area politicians attend the event.

Around the 1950s 80% of the patrons of the International YMCA, opened as the Chinatown Centre in 1943 but given its new name in 1950, were Chinese. Most of them were tusheng.

The pre-1960s Chinese community in Vancouver had social clubs and places of entertainment. The number of Chinese clubs increased in the mid-1950s. The Chinese Students Soccer Club was the only team not consisting of White Americans that was active during the 1920s and 1930s. There was also a Chinese Tennis Club. The Chinese Athletic Club and the Chinese Bowling Club were populated with tusheng or locally born Chinese. The increase in ethnic clubs prompted the YMCA to establish an inter-club council.

There have been numerous Kung Fu and athletic clubs for martial arts and lion dance practice, connected to family associations.

The community had the Chinese Opera House and Chinese Theatre.

Around the 1950s Chinese churches in Vancouver had their own recreational programs, including Boy Scouts.

To help mark the city’s centenary in 1986, volunteers affiliated with the Vancouver Chinese Cultural Centre instituted Pearl River Delta style dragon boat races on False Creek, the first of this particular variety of long paddled watercraft regatta in North America. The first international dragon boat races were held as part of Expo 86 and the city’s first ever Tuen Ng Jit (Duan Wu Jie) festival marking the fifth day of the fifth soli-lunar reckoned calendar month was celebrated on central False Creek between the Cambie St. and Granville St. bridges in June around the traditional time of the summer solstice. (Tuen Ng Jit refers to the sun at its most potent time of the year in the northern hemisphere.) Initial investigation to bring dragonboats to Canada began in 1984 when visits were paid to Hongkong to explore the international racing programs that had been started in 1976 by the Hong Kong Tourist Association. The Toronto Chinese Canadian community followed Vancouver’s lead and brought dragonboats to Toronto in 1988, the Year of the Earth Dragon. The 2010 Olympic Winter Games torch was delivered to the Opening Ceremony at BC Place, in part, via dragonboat moving up False Creek. Due to the June 2026 FIFA World Cup (men’s) the annual dragonboat festival on False Creek was prohibited from celebrating its 40th Anniversary festival (1986-2026).

The Chinese Canadian Military Museum Society is located in Vancouver. It was created in 1998 and maintains a museum in that city.

The Hong Kong Fair serves as a meeting event for Vancouverites of Hong Kong ancestry.

== Terminology ==
=== "Hongcouver" ===
The city is sometimes called "Hongcouver", by international media due to the size of the Chinese population; the term is no longer used locally and is regarded as derogatory. The nickname "Hongcouver" refers to the large numbers of Chinese in Vancouver. The nickname originated from the attraction of Hong Kong immigrants.

John Belshaw, a University of Victoria faculty member and author of Becoming British Columbia: A Population History, wrote that Vancouver's "bitter elite" created the term. Beginning in fall of 1988, and through the early 1990s some Greater Vancouver businesses sold T-shirts with the word "Hongcouver" on them. Use of the word by Vancouverites increased as more and more Chinese moved in.

David Ley, author of Millionaire Migrants: Trans-Pacific Life Lines, described it as an "imagined" term bringing an "exaggerated caricature" that was "fabricated" by media in North America and Hong Kong. Ley argued that "The motivation for presenting this entity was in part satirical, possibly on occasion racist". Miro Cernetig of the Vancouver Sun wrote that the term Hongcouver was "an era's impolitic catch-phrase for the xenophobia and palpable occidental unease in Vancouver at the prospect of a profound upheaval in society." Nathaniel M. Lewis, author of "Urban Demographics and Identities," described the term as "derogatory." Anu Sahota of the CBC described it as an "offensive term". Katie King, the author of Networked Reenactments: Stories Transdisciplinary Knowledges Tell, wrote that Vancouver was "lampooned in economic racist terms" through the word "Hongcouver".

Ley argued that there was also "insight" in the term "Hongcouver". Linda Solomon Wood of the Vancouver Observer stated that Hongcouver was one of several affectionate terms for Vancouver.

Lewis stated that "Hongcouver" was not as commonly used as it had been in the 1990s. In 2007 Cernetig also stated that it was no longer commonly used in the city. That year, Sahota stated that "Hongcouver" "persists today".

Ian Young, a correspondent of the South China Morning Post (SCMP), titled his blog about the Hong Konger population in Vancouver "Hongcouver".

the acronym UBC (University of British Columbia) was bacronymed as “university of a billion Chinese”). This is done in a similar derogatory vein.

== Notable residents ==
- Jim Chu, Chief Constable of the Vancouver Police Department
- Shawn Dou, actor
- Thomas Fung, founder of the Fairchild Group
- David Ho, businessperson
- Kristin Kreuk, actress of partial Chinese descent
- Jenny Kwan, activist, politician and cabinet
- David Lam, philanthropist and later Lieutenant Governor of BC
- Elisa Lam, UBC student whose 2013 death in a Los Angeles hotel attracted worldwide attention
- Art Lee, MP
- Richard Lee, member of the BC legislative assembly
- Shin Lim, card magician
- Wong Foon Sien, journalist and social activist
- Ken Sim, 41st mayor of Vancouver
- Milton Wong, businessman and philanthropist
- Gabriel Yiu, politician

== See also ==
- Chinese Canadians
- Taiwanese Canadians
- Hong Kong Canadians
- Chinese Benevolent Association of Vancouver
- Chinese Canadians in British Columbia
- Chinese Canadians in the Greater Toronto Area
- History of Chinese immigration to Canada
- Chinese head tax in Canada
- Royal Commission on Chinese Immigration (1885)
- Chinese Immigration Act of 1885
- Vancouver anti-Chinese riots, 1886
- Chinese Immigration Act, 1923
- Anti-Oriental riots (Vancouver)

== Notes ==
- Much of the content originates from Chinese Canadians in British Columbia
