= Chinese Cultural Centre, Vancouver =

Non-profit organization in Greater Vancouver

Chinese Cultural Centre
- Chinese Cultural Centre of Greater Vancouver
- 大溫哥華中華文化中心

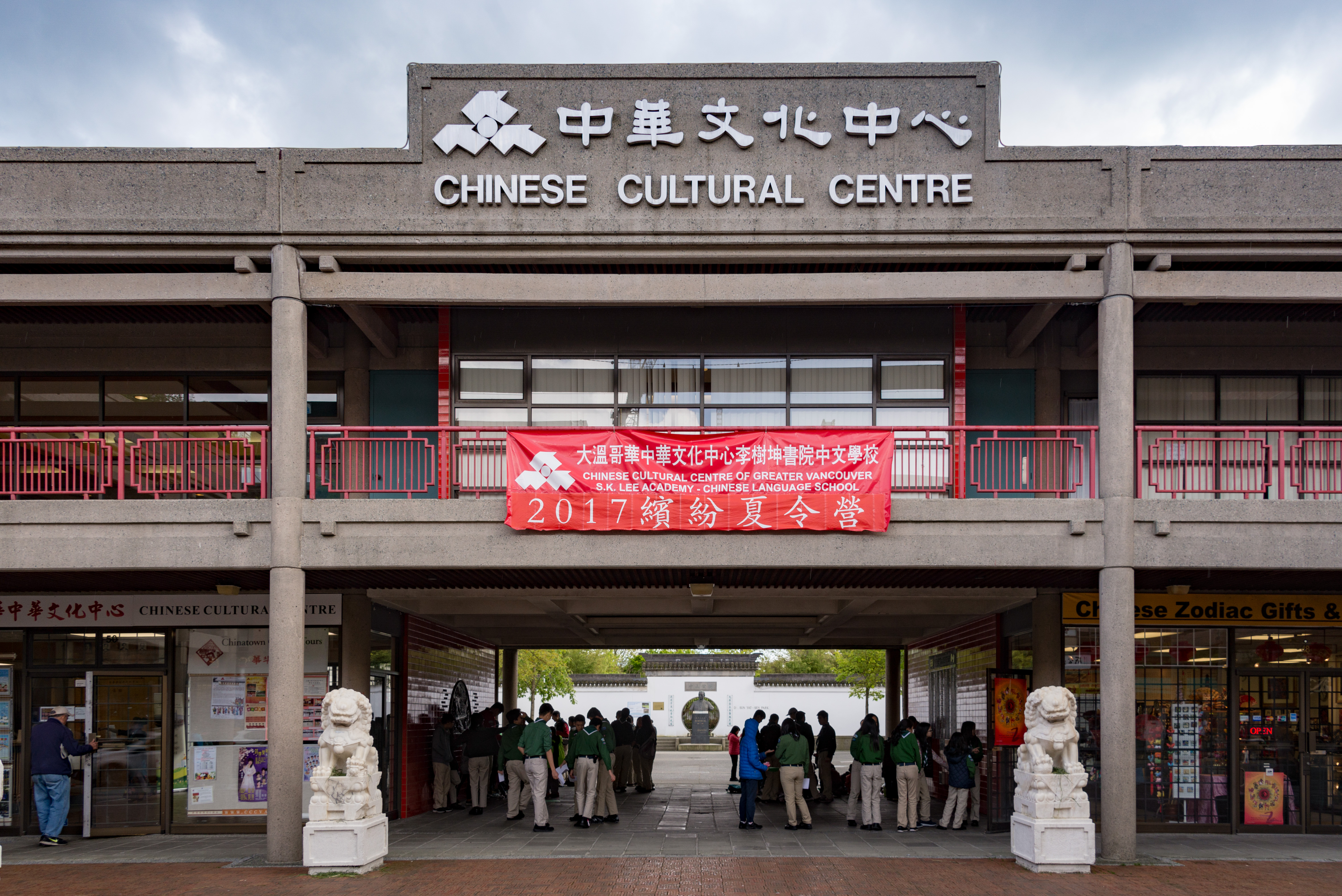
- The Chinese Cultural Centre Headquarters
- Abbreviation: CCC
- Established: 1973; 53 years ago
- Founded at: Chinatown, Vancouver
- Type: Non-profit, charitable, cultural institution
- Headquarters: 50 E. Pender Street, Vancouver, British Columbia, Canada V6A 3V6
- Location(s): Chinatown, Vancouver; Golden Village, Richmond
- Coordinates: 49.28003°N 123.10530°W
- Region served: Metro Vancouver
- Official language: English, Chinese
- Chairman: Bill Kwok
- Vice Chairman: Fred Kwok; Anthony Chan; Alex Nam; Jack Hui Chiu Tsun
- Treasurer: Melanie Miao
- Secretary: Barry Ko (Chinese); Keith York (English)
- Subsidiaries: Chinese Cultural Centre Museum; S.K. Lee Academy
- Website: www.cccvan.com

Chinese name
- Traditional Chinese: 大溫哥華中華文化中心
- Simplified Chinese: 大温哥华中华文化中心
Transcriptions
Standard Mandarin
- Hanyu Pinyin: dà wēn gē huá zhōng huá wén huà zhōng xīn
Yue: Cantonese
- Jyutping: daai^{6} wan^{1}go^{1}waa^{4} zung^{1}waa^{4} man^{4}faa^{3} zung^{1}sam^{1}

The Chinese Cultural Centre of Greater Vancouver (CCC; Chinese: 大溫哥華中華文化中心) is a non-profit, charitable Chinese Canadian organization. The organization was founded in 1973 with the initial administration and education complex opening in 1980.

The headquarters of the Chinese Cultural Centre is located in Chinatown, Vancouver, British Columbia. The building serves as a community centre, museum, and archives facility.

== History ==
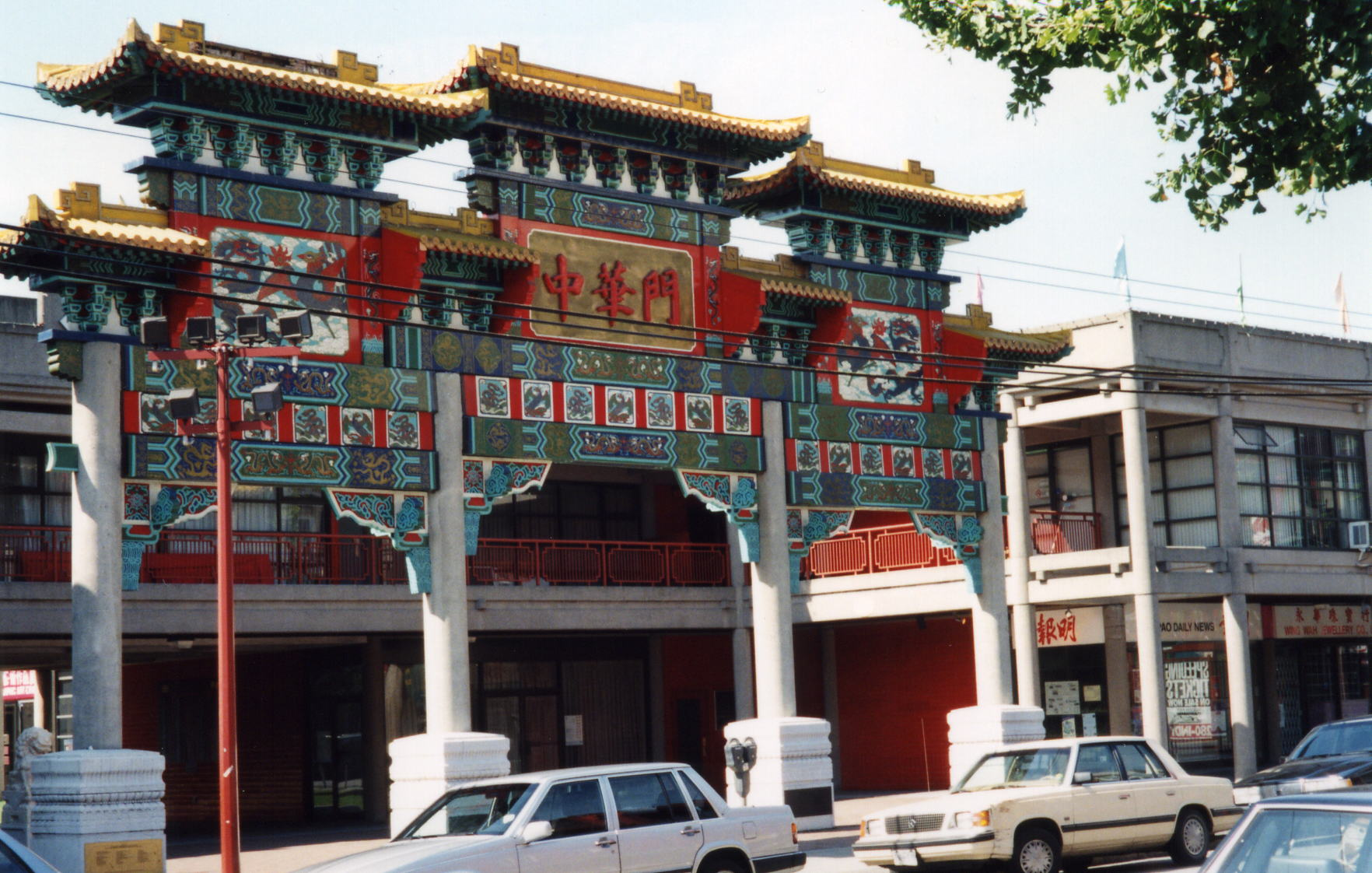
The original gate from Expo 86 installed outside the Chinese Cultural Centre headquarters in 1995

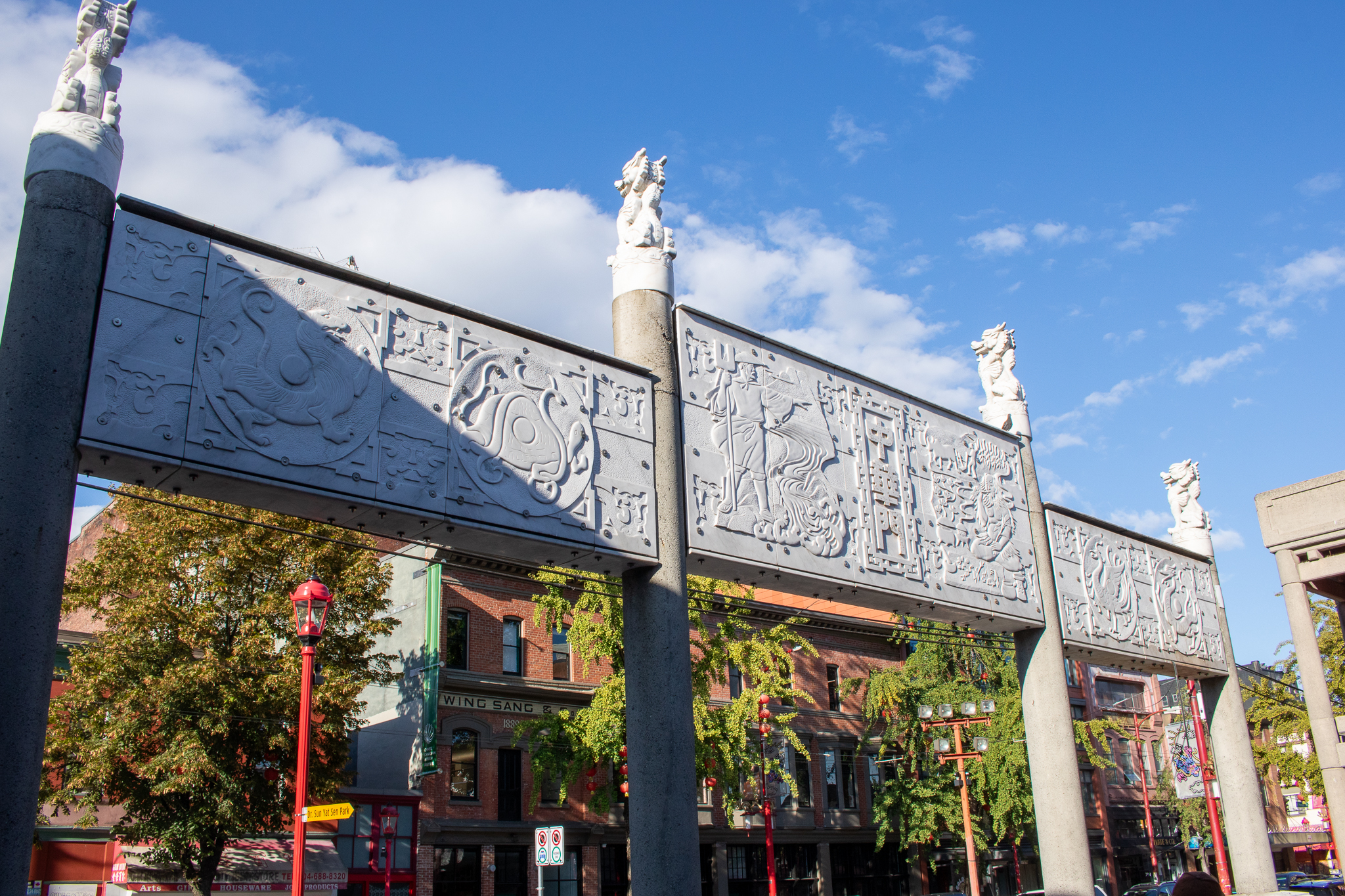
China Gate, designed by Shu Ren Cheng

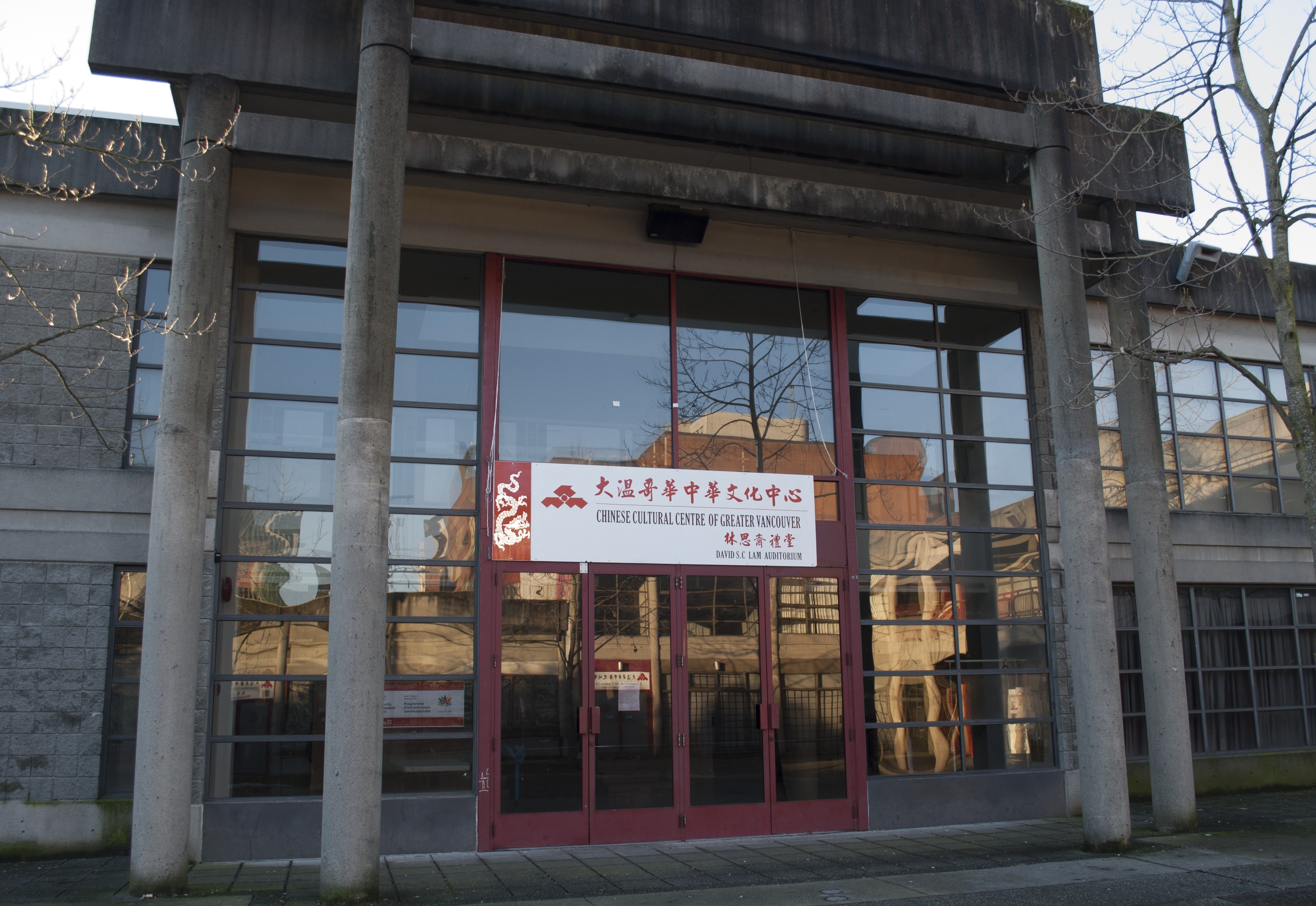
Dr. David S.C. Lam Auditorium

While construction proposals for the center began in the early 1970s, The Chinese Cultural Centre as an organization was formed in 1973 with the support of the Canadian government and 53 community organizations. The cultural centre was officially registered as a non-profit organization in April 1974.

In 1978, the CCC and National Gallery of Canada launched a joint competition for the design of the main complex and surrounding property. Forty architectural firms participated in the competition. The commission was ultimately won by Hong Kong architect James K. M. Cheng. Construction of the first administration and education complex was finished in 1980, where it was subsequently opened to the public. The adjoining Dr. David S.C. Lam Auditorium was completed in 1986.

In 2005, a marble gateway to the cultural centre was installed by the City of Vancouver titled China Gate to commemorate 20th anniversary of the Sister City agreement between Vancouver and Guangzhou. Designed by Shu Ren Cheng, the gate replaces an earlier one that was installed from the China pavilion during the Vancouver Expo 86.

In April 2020, the Chinatown facility was targeted and vandalized with graffiti linked to the COVID-19 pandemic in British Columbia.

== Architectural style ==
The building drew inspiration from the Forbidden City in Beijing, China, as a symbolic representation of Chinese identity and culture. The main entrance on Pender Street was intended to reflect the experience of entering the Imperial Palace, with visitors moving through a series of transitional spaces including a courtyard, interior entrance, forecourt, and central hall. The east wing draws parallels with the Hall of Supreme Harmony with the inclusion of a double-eave hip roof, a feature historically associated with official and ceremonial architecture of Imperial China.

The design of the building has been described as an example of Chinatown incorporation of cultural stereotypes and Orientalism, given the architectural references associated with the Ming Dynasty within a late-20th-century urban context. On the many design submissions for the building, the original design jury admitted that "no architectural form derived from the Eastern typology was desirable or necessary."

== Museum ==
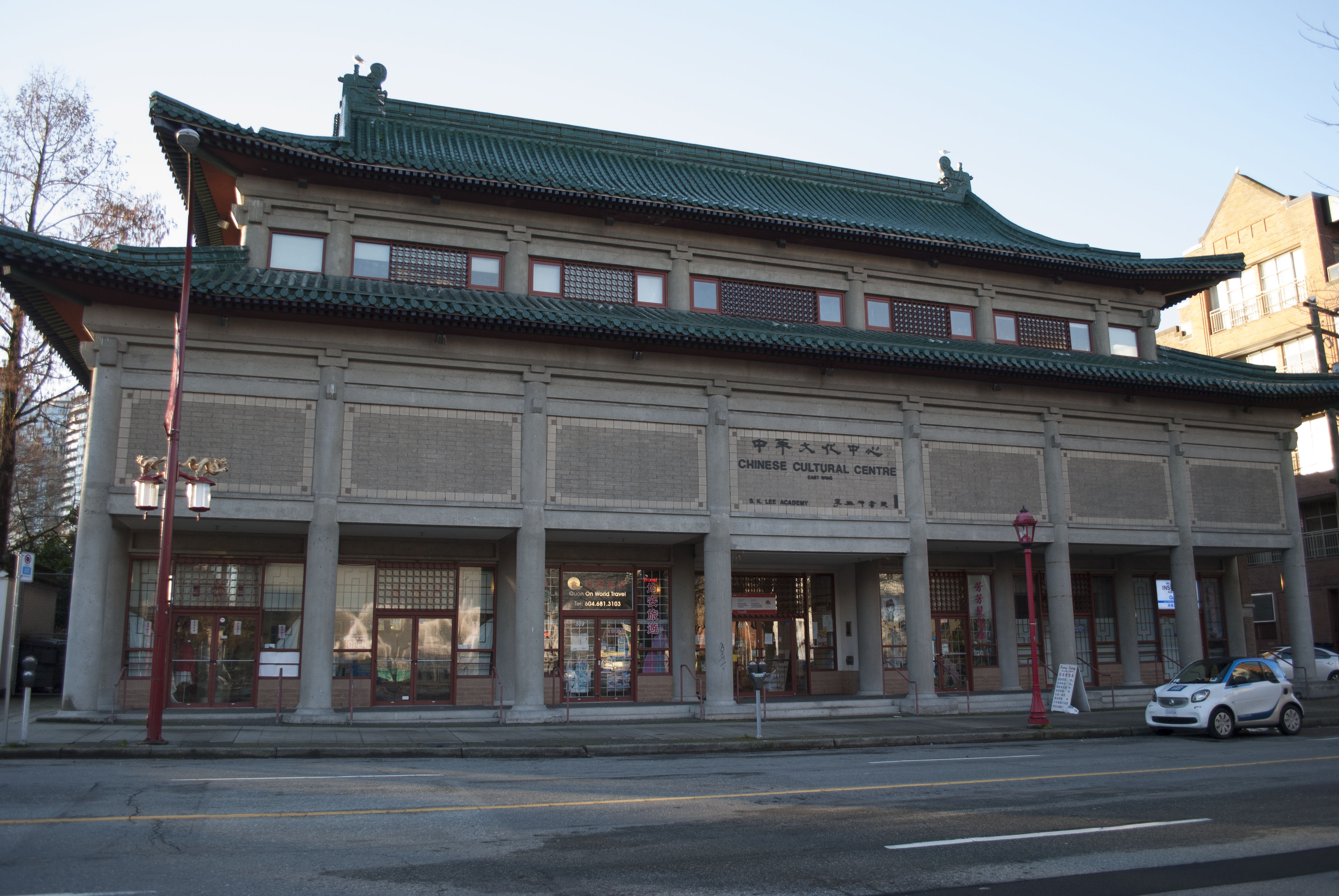
The Chinese Cultural Centre Museum located on 555 Columbia Street

The Chinese Cultural Centre Museum (Chinese: 大溫哥華中華文化中心文物館), is part of the Vancouver Chinatown headquarters of the organization. The museum houses two distinct exhibition spaces dedicated to regional history. A permanent exhibition is open on the ground floor dedicated to Chinese Canadian immigrants from the 19th and 20th centuries.

In November 1998, the Chinese Canadian Military Museum Society was founded by Colonel Howe Lee The museum was established on the second floor of the initial museum through funding raised within the Chinese Canadian community. The museum focuses on the military service and contributions of Chinese Canadians.

== S.K. Lee Academy ==
The Chinese language school, the S.K. Lee Academy, was established in 1981 to provide structured language and cultural education. The school operates over 300 classes, with instruction delivered in both Cantonese and Mandarin across multiple proficiency levels, including preschool, kindergarten, elementary, secondary, and advanced studies. In addition to core language programs, the curriculum features elective courses in traditional arts, calligraphy, and vocal music, alongside seasonal spring and summer camps.

In addition to the permanent Chinatown and Richmond locations, the S.K. Lee Academy runs courses out of community spaces in East Vancouver, Burnaby, Coquitlam, West Vancouver, and North Vancouver.

== See also ==
- Chinese Canadians in Greater Vancouver
- Chinese Benevolent Association of Vancouver
- Vancouver Chinatown Foundation
- Chinese Canadian Museum

== Sources ==
- Mitchell, Katharyne (August 1998). "Reworking Democracy: Contemporary Immigration and Community Politics in Vancouver's Chinatown". Political Geography. 17 (6): 729–750. doi:10.1016/S0962-6298(97)00070-X.
- Rock, Julianne Josephine (2005). We Are Chinese Canadian: The Response of Vancouver's Chinese Community to Hong Kong Immigrants, 1980–1997 (MA thesis). Simon Fraser University.
