= Saltwater City: An Illustrated History of the Chinese in Vancouver =

- First edition cover
- Author: Paul Yee
- Language: English
- Subject: Chinese Canadians in Greater Vancouver
- Publisher: Douglas & McIntyre
- Publication date: 1988
- Publication place: Canada
- Media type: Print (hardcover)
- Pages: 174
- Awards: City of Vancouver Book Award (1989)
- ISBN: 978-0-88894-616-4
- Dewey Decimal: 971.1/33
- LC Class: FC3847.9 .C45 Y43 1988

Saltwater City: An Illustrated History of the Chinese in Vancouver is a 1988 book by Paul Yee, published by Douglas & McIntyre. It discusses the development of the Chinese Canadian community in Vancouver, British Columbia.

The book has six chapters, organized chronologically. The book includes sidebar texts, documents, photographs, footnotes, a newspaper scan, and first-hand accounts. Mitchell Wong, a reviewer for the Amerasia Journal, stated the book is intended to be a "relatively short, illustrated" book that highlights key points of history, in a manner similar to that of Longtime Californ', instead of having analytical depth in the manner of A White Man's Province by Patricia Roy. Anthony B. Chan of California State University, Hayward wrote that "This was never intended to be a scholarly book." Judy Yung of the University of California, Santa Cruz wrote that Saltwater City is "not as scholarly" as Roy's book, From China to Canada, or Chinatowns: Towns Within Cities in Canada by Chuenyan Lai.

The book won the 1989 City of Vancouver Book Award and was a finalist for the 1989 Hubert Evans Non-Fiction Prize. A revised edition of the book was published in 2006.

== Background ==
Paul Yee, an archivist, is a third-generation Chinese Canadian. He also published children's books, and those works won awards, including the Governor General's Literary Award.

"Saltwater City" is a historical nickname for the city. The Chinese Cultural Centre in Vancouver had organized an exhibit named "Saltwater City," and the book was based on the exhibit, held in 1986, the city's centennial anniversary, and written to accompany it. The documents and photographs featured in the book originate from the exhibition. The original edition of the book was published in 1988 and later went out of print. Around 2007 there was a new edition of the book that went into print some time prior to 2007.

Sources include government documents, oral histories, data from the Canadian census, letters, photographs, English newspapers, Chinese newspapers, and archives of organizations.

== Content ==
Many personal accounts and photographs, all of which are in black and white, are included in the book. Genevieve Stuttaford of Publishers Weekly stated that many photographs are "washed-out" or "grainy". The book separates the history, case studies, and photograph commentary.

The book presents the book text on the same page with the interviews, with the latter in a pale-gray section at the bottom of each page; this style is often used by North American high school textbooks. Wong stated that this practice is "distracting" since the reading habits are "much like reading a footnote that covers many pages" as the viewer would have to keep switching pages, but that "a reader becomes accustomed to it."

Christopher Lee of the University of British Columbia (UBC) characterized the preface of the original edition as having an optimistic tone. The first groups of Chinese to arrive in British Columbia are discussed in chapters one through three. The 1920s through World War II are the subject of the fourth chapter. The 1950s and 1960s are discussed in the following two chapters. The coverage of the original edition extends to 1987. The ending chapter of the first edition discussed the 1980s openings of the Chinese Cultural Centre and the Sun Yat-sen Garden.

Lee characterized the opening preface of the new edition as being less optimistic. The new edition has an additional chapter that covers 1990s immigration. The book also has a new layout; Lee said that the new layout is superior to the previous one.

== Reception ==
Peter Leung of the University of California, Davis wrote that the book "is an important contribution to the history of Chinese-Canadian immigration."

Selma Thomas, who reviewed the book for The Western Historical Quarterly, stated that it was "a proud story and well told."

Lee stated that the publishing of the revised edition was a "welcome event that will be of benefit to anyone interested in Asian Canadian Studies."

Olga Stein of Books in Canada argued that the book was "a valuable compilation of first-hand accounts and documentary information, and a celebration of individual and collective achievements." She compared the book to Not Paved With Gold: Italian-Canadian Immigrants in the 1970s by Vincenzo Pietropaolo.

Wong concluded, "the book provides an excellent short history of Chinese in Vancouver as well as an entertaining, educational account of Chinese life in North America" and that "It is a much-needed publication about Vancouver's Chinatown and makes enjoyable reading for anyone interested in North American Chinese."

Yuen-fong Woon of the University of Victoria criticized the lack of explanation of some terms and events and the book's decision to separate the history, photographic commentary, and case studies. Despite the criticisms, Woon concluded "Saltwater City is an important source book or reference work for scholars and an interesting addition for the general reader's collections on ethnic Chinese communities in Canada."

Yung wrote that the book "offers an excellent short history of Chinese Canadian life and is a fitting tribute to the pioneers who persevered despite the hard times in the American West."

Anthony B. Chan wrote that the book was "worth the wait" and that the book was a "fine contribution".

== See also ==
- Chinese Canadians in British Columbia
- Everything Will Be, a 2014 documentary film about Vancouver's Chinatown
