= Roy Mah =

Roy Mah (born Mah Quock Quon, 29 March 1918 – 22 June 2007) was a Canadian veteran, journalist and activist.

Born in Edmonton, Alberta, and raised in Victoria, British Columbia, Mah enlisted during the Second World War. He served with Force 136 at the rank of sergeant. Mah was to lead an entirely Chinese-Canadian force in guerrilla actions in Southeast Asia against Japanese forces, but after the atomic bombings of Hiroshima and Nagasaki the mission was cancelled.

After returning to British Columbia, Mah used military service by Chinese-Canadians as a lever to advocate for equal voting rights for this community. He published the first English-language Chinese community newspaper in North America, Chinatown News, which he used to promote this cause. The right to vote was granted to Chinese-Canadians in 1947. He was also a labour organizer for the International Woodworkers of America and founded the Chinese Canadian Military Museum and the Chinese Cultural Centre.

For his military service Mah was awarded the Burma Star, the War Medal, the Canadian Volunteer Service Medal and the 1939-45 Star. He received the Order of British Columbia in 2003. In 2007 Vancouver mayor Sam Sullivan named 12 July 2007 "Roy Mah Day".
