= S.U.C.C.E.S.S. =

Canadian social services organization

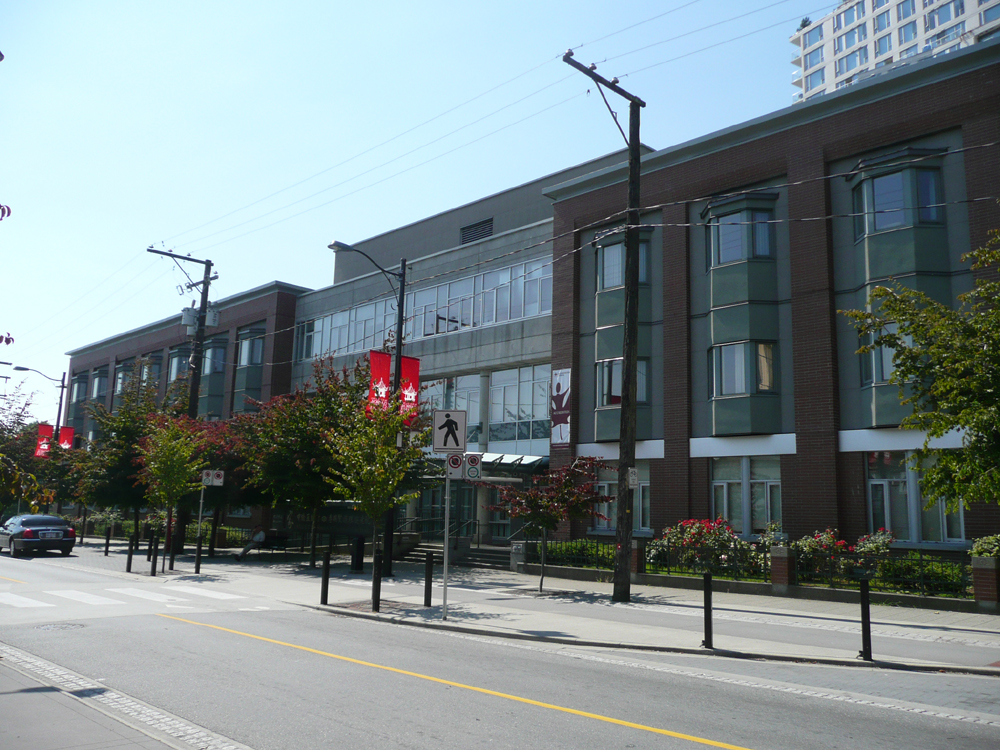
- The S.U.C.C.E.S.S. Simon K.Y. Lee Seniors Care Home in Chinatown, Vancouver
- Formation: 1973; 53 years ago
- Founders: Maggie Ip, Jonathan Lau, Linda Leong, Mei-Chan Lin, and Pauline To
- Type: Non-profit, charitable
- Tax ID no.: 108152349
- Headquarters: 28 West Pender Street; Vancouver, British Columbia, Canada, V6B 1R6
- Location: Vancouver, Richmond, Burnaby, Surrey, Port Coquitlam, Coquitlam, Fort St. John, Toronto, Beijing, Seoul
- CEO: Queenie Choo
- Chairperson: Donnie Wing
- Vice Chair and Treasurer: Philip Bates
- Secretary: Tanya Petraszko
- Website: www.successbc.ca

S.U.C.C.E.S.S.
- Traditional Chinese: 中僑互助會
- Simplified Chinese: 中侨互助会
Transcriptions
Standard Mandarin
- Hanyu Pinyin: Zhōng Qiáo Hùzhù Huì

The United Chinese Community Enrichment Services Society, or S.U.C.C.E.S.S., is a Canadian social services organization headquartered in Vancouver, British Columbia.

== History ==
In 1973, the organization was founded to provide social services for Chinese, including recent immigrants. It was founded by several persons of Hong Kong origin, including Maggie Ip, who became the first chairperson, Jonathan Lau, Linda Leong, Mei-Chan Lin, and Pauline To.

Since 1989, an increasing number of clients originated from Taiwan and the Mainland, altering the up-until-then almost entirely Hong Kong demographic base. S.U.C.C.E.S.S., in 1990, served 60,000 people, mostly persons between 20 and 40, with 110,000 contacts. As of 1991, its headquarters were on the second floor of the Beijing Building in the Vancouver Chinatown and it maintained branch offices in South Vancouver, Burnaby, and Richmond.

In 2003, it had 350 employees, a headquarters in Vancouver, and 11 other offices in the Greater Vancouver region. As of the same year, its budget was $16 million.

The organization, from 2006 until 2010, was headed by CEO Tung Chan, a former Vancouver city councilor. S.U.C.C.E.S.S. has been headed by Queenie Choo since 2012. Long-time Vancouver Police Department officer Terry Yung has served as the group's chair, vice-chair, and board member. S.U.C.C.E.S.S. is a member of the Chinese Benevolent Association of Vancouver.

In 2014, S.U.C.C.E.S.S. reportedly had posted signs in Richmond that were only in Chinese during the midst of a local controversy regarding Chinese-only signs. Queenie Choo apologized and had the signs taken down.

In 2015, S.U.C.C.E.S.S. opened a pre-arrival immigrant service center in Beijing called the Active Engagement and Integration Project (AEIP).

As of 2015, S.U.C.C.E.S.S. was listed as an "Overseas Chinese Services Organization" by the Overseas Chinese Affairs Office (OCAO), at the time part of the State Council of the People's Republic of China.

Canadian intelligence analyst Scott McGregor and journalist Ina Mitchell noted in their book, The Mosaic Effect, that S.U.C.C.E.S.S. is an example of an organization that provides legitimate services to the Chinese Canadian community while also working with entities tied to Operation Foxhunt.

By 2019, the organization had a budget of over $50 million. In 2019, Immigration, Refugees and Citizenship Canada provided S.U.C.C.E.S.S. with $22.4 million in funding to deliver settlement services to immigrants and refugees before they arrive in Canada. During the COVID-19 pandemic, the organization received a $499,747 grant from the Public Health Agency of Canada's Immunization Partnership Fund to increase uptake of COVID-19 vaccines among immigrants in the Metro Vancouver area. As of 2021, more than 82 percent of S.U.C.C.E.S.S.'s budget came from the Canadian government.

== See also ==
- Chinese Canadians in Greater Vancouver
