= Ghost Train (book) =

Children's picture book by Paul Yee

- Author: Paul Yee
- Illustrator: Harvey Chan
- Cover artist: Harvey Chan
- Language: English
- Subject: Children's Literature
- Published: 1996
- Publication place: Canada

Ghost Train is a children's picture book by Chinese-Canadian historian and writer Paul Yee. It is illustrated with oil paintings by Chinese-Canadian artist Harvey Chan. The book was first published in 1996.

== Awards ==
- 1996 Governor General's Literary Award for Children's Literature
- 1997 Ruth Schwartz Children's Book Award
- 1997 Amelia Frances Howard-Gibbon Illustrator's Award
- 1998 Prix Enfantasie (Switzerland)(Winner; for French language version: Le train fantôme)

== Adaptation ==
Ghost Train was adapted as a play by Betty Quan and performed by the Young People's Theatre in Toronto in 2001.
