= Chinatown Storytelling Centre =

Museum in Vancouver, British Columbia

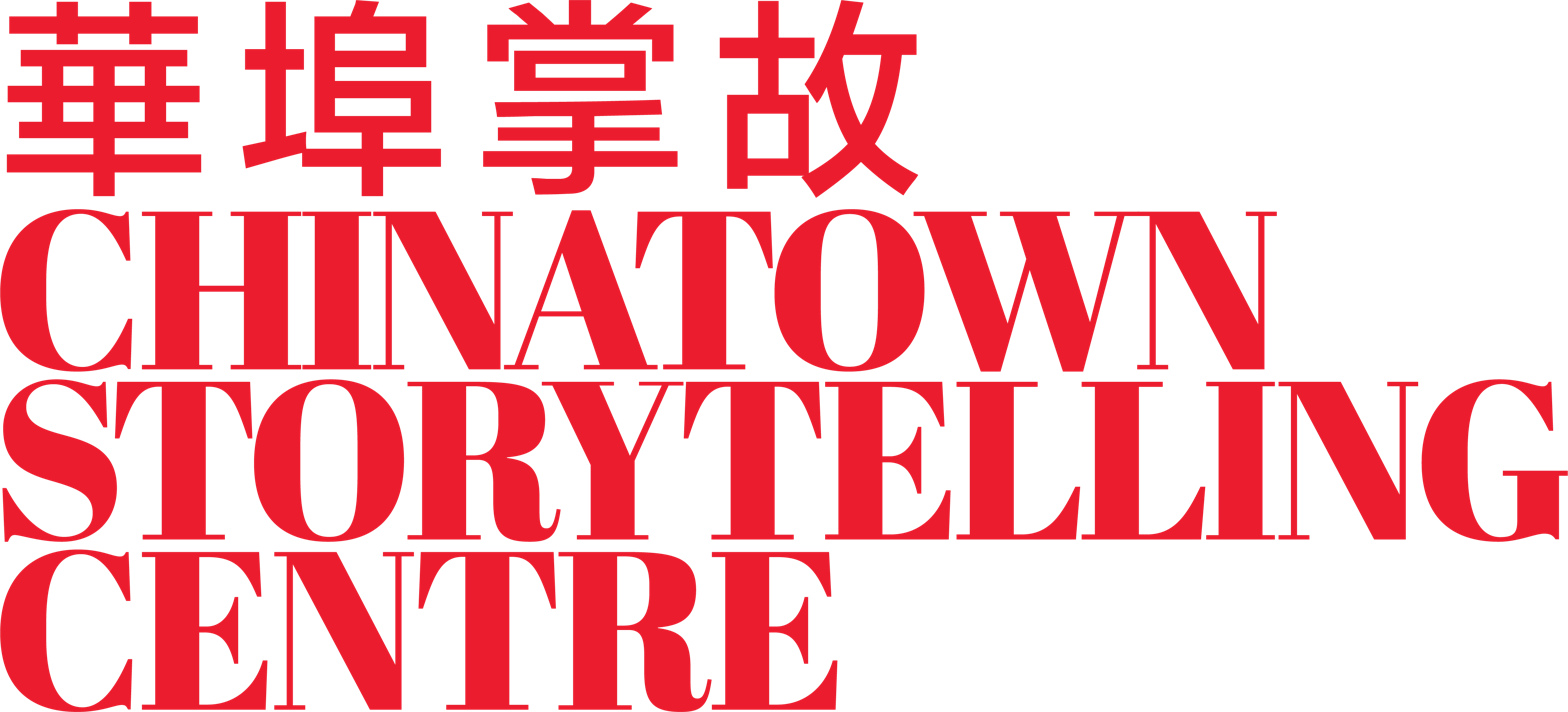

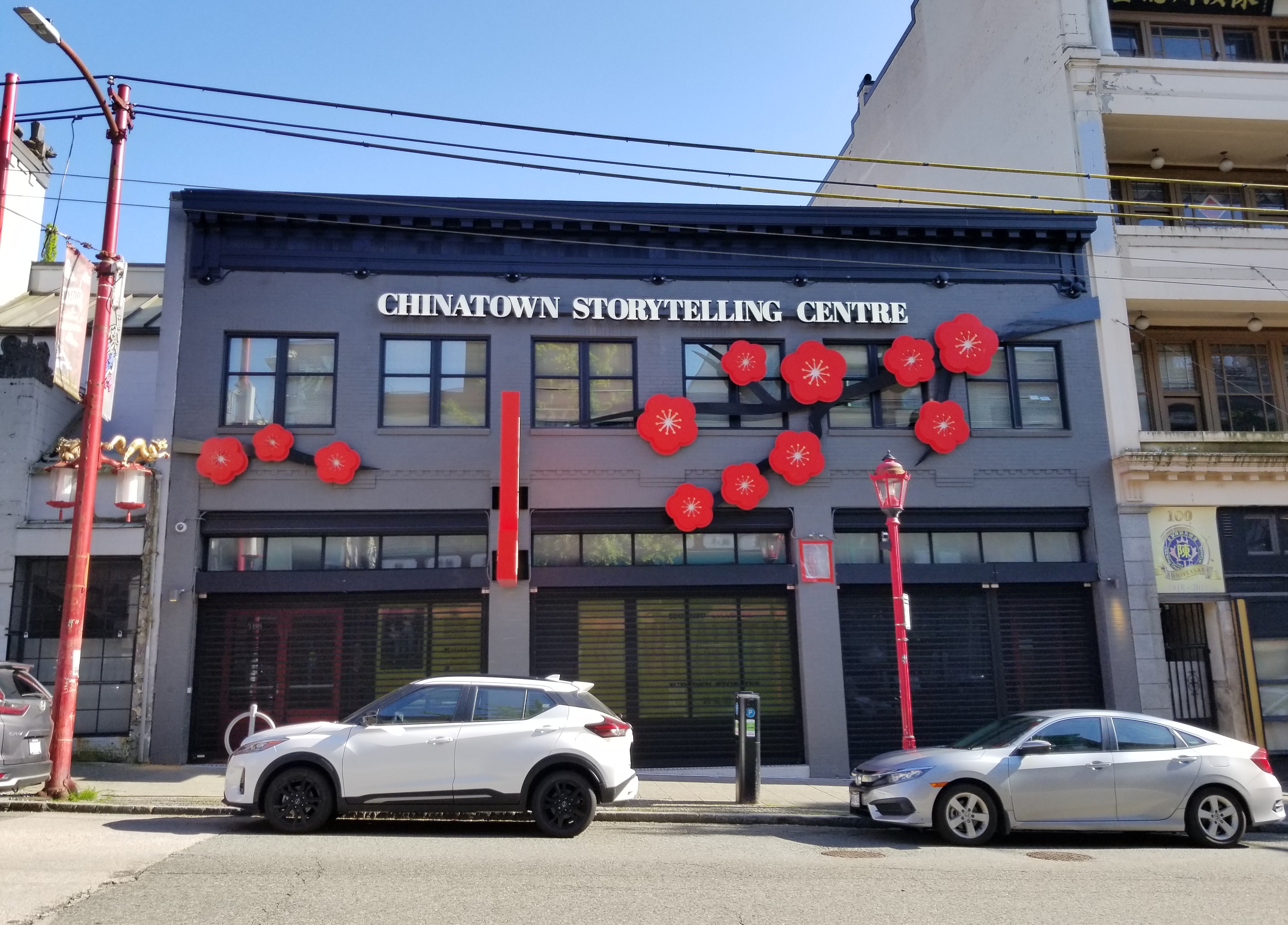
- The Chinatown Storytelling Centre in 2025
- Established: November 6, 2021
- Location: 168 East Pender Street, Vancouver, British Columbia, Canada
- Coordinates: 49°16′49″N 123°06′03″W
- Owner: Vancouver Chinatown Foundation
- Public transit access: 19 Stanley Park / Metrotown Station
- Website: www.chinatownstorytellingcentre.org

Chinese name
- Traditional Chinese: 華埠掌故
- Simplified Chinese: 华埠掌故
Transcriptions
Standard Mandarin
- Hanyu Pinyin: Huábù Zhǎnggù
Yue: Cantonese
- Jyutping: waa^{4} fau^{6} zoeng^{2} gu^{3}
other Yue
- Taishanese: va^{3} feu^{5} ziang^{2} gu^{1}

The Chinatown Storytelling Centre (Chinese: 華埠掌故) is a museum in the Chinatown of Vancouver, British Columbia, focused on the personal stories and experiences of Chinese Canadians. It is run by the Vancouver Chinatown Foundation and was opened on November 6, 2021. It has a permanent exhibit, temporary exhibits, and a gift shop. Its curators describe it as a "cultural and educational centre, and community hub" rather than a museum.

== Construction and funding ==
On August 26, 2019, then Canadian small business minister Mary Ng announced that the federal government had pledged CA$500,000 to the construction of an "immersive museum" in Vancouver's Chinatown that would be named the "Chinatown Storytelling Centre", with a focus on the historical and current experiences of Chinese Canadians. The grant was part of a larger $4.4 million federal investment in the arts, culture, and heritage organizations of British Columbia.

The Vancouver Chinatown Foundation, a non-profit organization founded in 2011 to revitalize Chinatown, oversaw the construction of the museum and had acquired the site for it two years earlier – a two-storey, 4,000 square feet (370 m^{2}) building that had previously been a branch of the Bank of Montreal (BMO). In May 2021, in celebration of Asian Heritage Month, BMO donated an additional $1 million toward the museum's completion and future operations. The Chinatown Storytelling Centre opened to the public on November 6, 2021.

== Exhibits and features ==
The ground level features interactive exhibits and a gift shop, while the upper level is used as an office space by the Vancouver Chinatown Foundation.

The permanent exhibit, known as the "BMO Hall", includes several interactive kiosks, a photo studio, a theatre, and a replica pagoda phone booth. The photo studio is a tribute to Yucho Chow, a prolific photographer who was Vancouver's first of Chinese descent, and features an imitation press camera for creating digital postcards. The theatre meanwhile showcases short films produced by the Vancouver Chinatown Foundation and its community partners. Additionally, the pagoda phone booth contains a phone that, when dialed, will play personal stories from the Chinatown community in either English or Cantonese.

The museum also has temporary "special exhibits"; past exhibits include the life of the first Asian-Canadian bank manager Tommy Mah, as well as the work of local photographer Fred Herzog.

Despite its exhibits, the curators and operators of the Chinatown Storytelling Centre do not call it a museum, but rather a "cultural and educational centre, and community hub".

The Chinatown Storytelling Centre's gift shop is named Foo Hung Curios, after an early-20th-century import-export business in Chinatown run by businessman Bick Lee.
