= Paul Yee =

Chinese-Canadian historian and writer (born 1956)

- Born: 1 October 1956 (age 70); Spalding, Saskatchewan, Canada
- Occupation: Writer
- Writing career
- Period: 1983–present
- Notable works: Saltwater City; Ghost Train; Teach Me to Fly, Skyfighter; The Curses of Third Uncle; Dead Man's Gold
- Website: www.paulyee.ca

Paul Yee (born 1 October 1956) is a Chinese-Canadian historian and writer. He is the author of many books for children, including Teach Me to Fly, Skyfighter, The Curses of Third Uncle, Dead Man's Gold, and Ghost Train—winner of the 1996 Governor General's Award for English language children's literature. In 2012, the Writers' Trust of Canada awarded Paul Yee the Vicky Metcalf Award for Literature for Young People in recognition of having "contributed uniquely and powerfully to our literary landscape over a writing career that spans almost 30 years".

== Early life and education ==
Paul Yee was born in Spalding, Saskatchewan, in 1956 but was raised in Chinatown, Vancouver, by his aunt Lilian. He describes himself as feeling "caught between two worlds" growing up, and many of his works about Chinese-Canadians reflect this tension. He attended Lord Strathcona Elementary School and Britannia Secondary School in Vancouver. Paul Yee obtained a bachelor's and master's degree in Canadian history from the University of British Columbia.

== Career ==
Yee has volunteered at the Vancouver Chinese Cultural Center (1974–1987) and worked as an archivist at the City of Vancouver Archives (1979–1987) and at the Archives of Ontario (1988–1991). He also worked at the Ontario Ministry of Citizenship (1991–1997).

Paul Yee's first book, titled Teach Me to Fly, Skyfighter! And Other Stories and illustrated by Sky Lee, was published in 1983 by James Lorimer & Company. He has stated that his career as a writer is "a fluke" as it was Lorimer that approached Yee, wanting a knowledgeable person to create a book set in Vancouver's Chinatown neighborhood. Since then, he has published over twenty-five distinct works - including children's books, young adult books, short stories, and non-fiction books for adults. One of his books for children, Ghost Train, was adapted as a play by Betty Quan and performed by the Young Peoples Theatre in Toronto in 2001. Yee's first original play, Jade in the Coal, premiered at the Frederic Wood Theatre in Vancouver on November 25, 2010. In 2011, he created a poem to accompany the Vancouver Youth Symphony Orchestra's performance of an original composition by Jin Zhang. The piece was translated from English to Chinese and performed in both languages by Tommy Tao.

Yee writes primarily about the Chinese-Canadian experience, both historically and presently. He addresses the question of why he writes about Chinese-Canadians on his website, stating: "When I was a child, growing up in the 1960s, there were no books about my world--the world of immigrants, racial minorities, and different histories. I had to learn about these things much later in life... My books mirror images of Chinese people back to themselves. Such books can reassure those in North America that it is valid to be different from the 'mainstream.' As well, the books let Chinese in North America see themselves, and each other, from new and different angles." Yee now resides in Toronto and writes full-time.

Three recently published monographs have featured chapters on Yee's publications; these include: Dr. John Z. Ming Chen's The Influence of Daoism on Asian-Canadian Writers (Mellen, 2008), prefaced by Dr. Yuhua Ji; Dr. John Z. Ming Chen's and Dr. Wei Li's A Study of Canadian Social Realist Literature: Neo-Marxist, Confucian, and Daoist Approaches (Inner Mongolia University Press, 2011); and Dr. John Z. Ming Chen's and Dr. Yuhua Ji's Canadian-Daoist Poetics, Ethics, and Aesthetics (Springer, 2015).

== Works ==
Picture books:

- Teach Me to Fly, Skyfighter and Other Stories (1983)
- Roses Sing on New Snow (1991)
- Ghost Train (1996)
- The Boy in the Attic (1998)
- Jade Necklace (2002)
- A Song for Ba (2004)
- "The Lost Spike" (short story) (2004)
- Bamboo (2005)
- Shu-Li and Tamara (2008)
- Shu-Li and Diego (2009)
- Friends of Kwan ming

Middle grade & young adult:

- The Curses of Third Uncle (1986)
- Tales from Gold Mountain (1989)
- Breakaway (1994)
- Struggle and Hope: the Chinese in Canada (1996)
- Fly Away (short story) (2001)
- Dead Man's Gold and Other Stories (2002)
- Bone Collector's Son (2003)
- What Happened This Summer (2006)
- Learning to Fly (2008)
- Blood and Iron (2010)
- The Secret Keepers (2011)
- Money Boy (2011)

Adult:

- Saltwater City: An Illustrated History of the Chinese in Vancouver (1988)
- If Walls Could Talk (2003)
- Chinatown (2005)
- Arrivals (a poem) (2011)
- Jade in the Coal (a play) (2011)
- A Superior Man (2015)

== Awards and honours ==
- 1983: Canadian Children's Book Centre Our Choice Selection for Teach Me to Fly, Skyfighter and Other Stories
- 1989: City of Vancouver Book Award for Saltwater City
- 1990: Sheila Egoff Children's Prize (Winner) for Tales from Gold Mountain
- 1990: Notable Children's Book–Social Studies for Tales from Gold Mountain
- 1992: Ruth Schwartz Children's Literature Award for Roses Sing on New Snow
- 1994: YALSA Best Book for Young Adults: Breakaway
- 2006: Alcuin Society Awards for Excellence in Book Design in Canada–Prose Non-fiction Illustrated category for Saltwater City
- 2012: Vicky Metcalf Award for Children's Literature

For Ghost Train:

- 1996 Governor General's Literary Award for Children's Literature (Text)
- 1997 Ruth Schwartz Children's Book Award (Picture Books)
- 1998 Prix Enfantasie (Swiztzerland)(Winner; for French language version: Le train fantôme)
- 1997 Amelia Frances Howard-Gibbon Illustrator's Award

For Dead Man's Gold:

- 2003: New York Public Library Best Books for the Teen Age
- 2003: Booklist Top Ten Historical Fiction Books of the Year
- 2002: Honor Book, Kiriyama Prize, 2002 (books about Pacific Rim nations)
