= Chinese Benevolent Association of Vancouver =

Canadian nonprofit organization

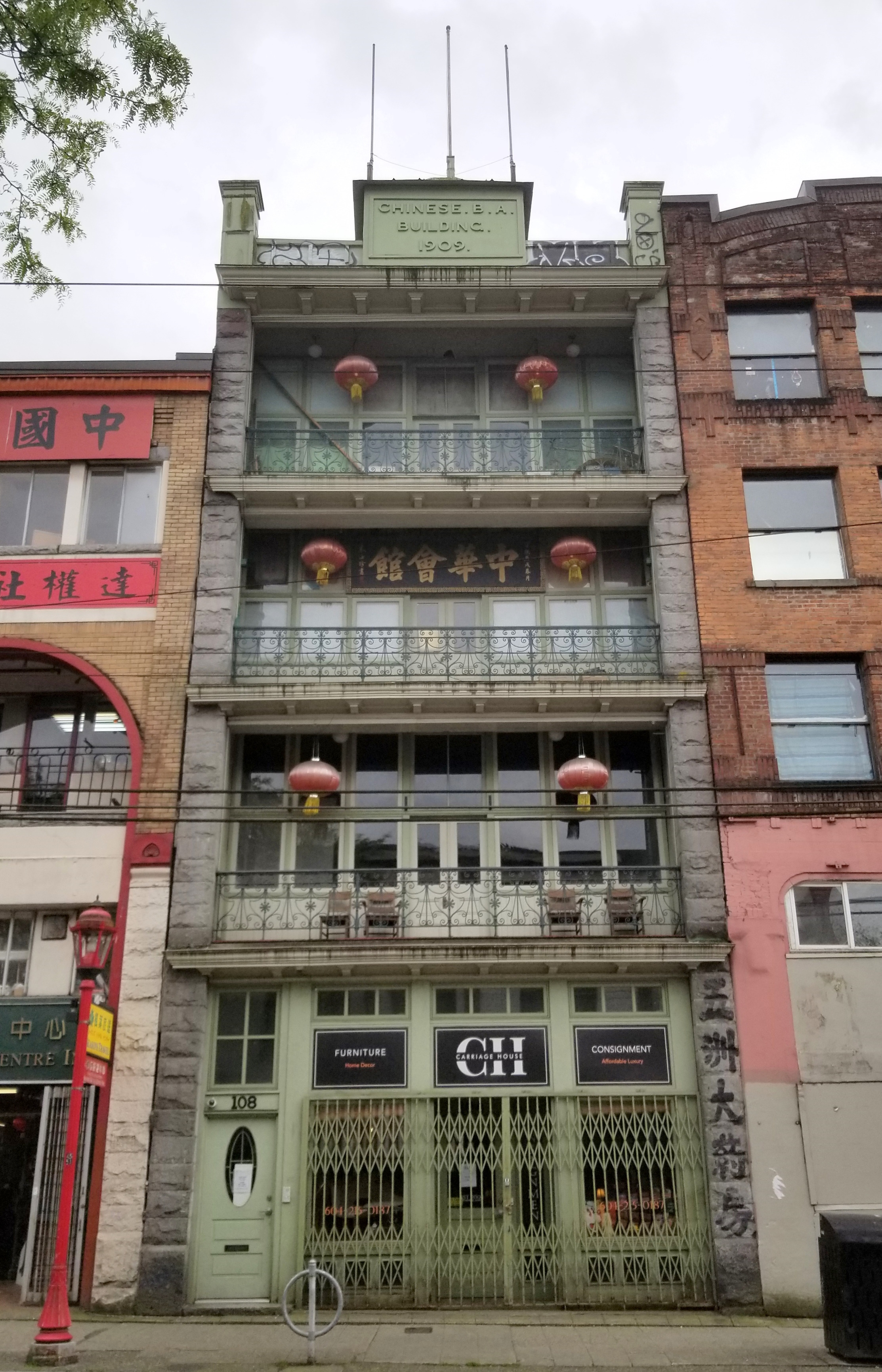
- The Chinese Benevolent Association Building built in 1907.
- Formation: 1896; 130 years ago
- Founders: Wong Soon King, Lee Kee, Shum Moon, Yip Sang, Leong Suey, Chang Toy, and Chow Tong
- Type: Non-profit
- Tax ID no.: 106915499
- Headquarters: Vancouver
- Website: www.cbavancouver.com

Chinese Benevolent Association of Vancouver
- Traditional Chinese: 加拿大溫哥華中華會館
- Simplified Chinese: 加拿大温哥华中华会馆
Transcriptions
Standard Mandarin
- Hanyu Pinyin: Jiānádà Wēngēhuá Zhōnghuá Huìguǎn
Yue: Cantonese
- Jyutping: gaa1 naa4 daai6 wan1 go1 waa4 zung1 waa4 wui6 gun2

The Chinese Benevolent Association of Vancouver (CBA) is a Chinese Canadian organization headquartered in Vancouver. It serves as a federation of various Vancouver-based Chinese organizations. Douglas Aitken of The Georgia Straight stated that the CBA was the most important organization operating in the Vancouver Chinatown in the first half of the 20th century. The Vancouver Sun wrote "They were, for all intents and purposes, the government of Chinatown." According to The New York Times, the organization was a longtime supporter of Taiwan until the 1980s when it shifted to a pro-Beijing position. It maintains ties with united front groups.

== History ==
Prominent Chinatown business leaders Wong Soon King, Lee Kee, Shum Moon, Yip Sang, Leong Suey, Chang Toy, and Chow Tong founded the CBA in 1896. The goal of the organization was to protect Chinese business interests and livelihoods against discrimination. Ten years later the CBA received a designation as a nonprofit organization. Willmott wrote that the CBA's role as a federation of multiple locality associations in Vancouver did not correspond "to the reality of power groupings within the Chinese community in Vancouver" and that it was unlike other Canadian benevolent associations; Willmott concluded that the Vancouver CBA structure "probably" originated from the San Francisco CBA's structure. The Vancouver CBA operated the Chinese Benevolent Association Building in Chinatown; it was built in 1907. In 1910, a hospital was built on the second and third floors of the CBA Building. The hospital offered free medical services and beds prior to its shutdown by the government in 1919 who cited poor conditions. A new makeshift hospital was created by the CBA to replace the ailing one. Additional association buildings opened in the 1910s and 1920s. As the British Columbia Chinese population shifted to Vancouver, the Chinese Consolidated Benevolent Association in Victoria moved to Vancouver in the 1930s. In 1943, $30,000 was raised by the CBA to expand the hospital, and this expansion later was incorporated into the Mount Saint Joseph Hospital. Post-1949, for a period, the CBA was supportive of the Republic of China, which had relocated to Taiwan.

In 1962 the association gave places in its ruling committee to representatives of every other Chinese association in the Vancouver Chinatown. This was done due to changing sociopolitical conditions; Chinese in that period were finding a greater acceptance in mainstream society and new immigrants were not oriented to the older Chinatown organizations. In 1964 Willmott wrote that "many Chinese", especially more assimilated Chinese, "do not recognize its right to speak for them". According to Aitken, the organization "lost most of its influence" in the 1970s, and the Chinese Benevolent Association of Canada split from it in 1979.

Circa the 1980s the organization became closer to the People's Republic of China. Aitken stated that the CBA regained influence by 2014. In 1991 the president of the CBA estimated that the organization had 10,000 members; the per person membership fee was $1 and there were multiple paths to membership, so Hugh Xiaobin Tan, author of "Chinese-Canadian Associations in Vancouver," concluded that the exact membership was "difficult to determine".

In 2023, citing some CBA advertisements that favored the Hong Kong national security law, Norimitsu Onishi stated that "it has recently become a cheerleader of some of Beijing’s most controversial policies". Canadian intelligence analyst Scott McGregor and journalist Ina Mitchell referred to the CBA as a "great example of a legitimate organization that has been co-opted by the United Front."

== Activities ==
As of 1964 it operated a Cantonese language school, provided legal counseling services, facilitated Chinese involvement in events for the public, established welfare programs, and issued public statements intended to represent the views of the Chinese community as a whole.

By 1964 Chinese Canadians were receiving proper services in the Canadian court system; in previous eras when Chinese were not well-served by the Canadian courts, the CBA served as a court of appeal for the Chinese.

In response to the 2014 Hong Kong protests and the 2019–20 Hong Kong protests, the CBA took out local newspaper ads that were sympathetic to the stance of the Chinese Communist Party (CCP) and critical of the protesters. The nature and verbiage of the ads raised questions of involvement by the CCP's United Front Work Department and its affiliated groups. In September 2019, the CBA held a gala in celebration of the founding of the People's Republic of China. In July 2020, the CBA issued a statement in support of the widely criticized Hong Kong national security law.

During the 2021 Canadian federal election, the CBA hosted an event in support of Liberal Party candidate Josh Vander Vies.

In response to the 2022 visit by Nancy Pelosi to Taiwan, the group signed a letter, published in Ming Pao Daily News, denouncing the visit and expressing support for Chinese unification. According to The Economist, the CBA maintains close ties with united front groups.

== Representation ==
The organizations represented by the CBA include the Chinese Cultural Centre (CCC), the Chinese Freemasons, the Chinatown Merchants Association, and S.U.C.C.E.S.S. As of 1991, it represented 48 other groups.

== See also ==
- Chinese Benevolent Association
- Chinatown, Vancouver
- Chinese Canadians in Greater Vancouver
- History of Chinese immigration to Canada
- Chinese head tax in Canada
- Royal Commission on Chinese Immigration (1885)
- Chinese Immigration Act of 1885
- Vancouver anti-Chinese riots, 1886
- Chinese Immigration Act, 1923
- Anti-Oriental riots (Vancouver)

== Notes ==
- Some content originates from Chinese Canadians in British Columbia
