= From China to Canada =

1982 book

From China to Canada: A History of the Chinese Communities in Canada
- Editor: Edgar Wickberg
- Language: English
- Subject: Chinese immigration to Canada
- Genre: Non-fiction
- Publisher: McClelland & Stewart
- Publication date: 1982

From China to Canada: A History of the Chinese Communities in Canada is a 1982 book edited by Edgar Wickberg and published by McClelland & Stewart. It was collectively produced by five authors: Wickberg, Harry Con, Ronald J. Con, Graham Johnson, and William E. Willmott. The publisher produced the book in association with the Government Publishing Centre of Supply and Services Canada and the Multiculturalism Directorate of the Canadian Department of the Secretary of State. The book discusses Chinese immigration to Canada, and it covers the years 1858 to 1980. It includes comparisons of Chinese communities in urban and rural areas and across different provinces. Sucheng Chan of the University of California, Santa Cruz wrote that From China to Canada "deals systematically with developments during the "dark ages" in the history of the Chinese in North America". Tetsuden Kashima of the University of Washington wrote that the book "is a straightforward history." Peter Kong-ming New of the University of South Florida described the book as having a "sociohistorical view" of the history.

== Background ==
The Department of the Secretary of State of Canada's Citizenship Branch commissioned the publication of the book. There were five authors, and each specialized in a particular aspect of Chinese Canadian history. Ronald J. Con was an employee of the Department of the Secretary of State. Harry Con, a Vancouver resident and ethnic Chinese, is a businessperson. Wickberg is a historian at the University of British Columbia. Johnson and Willmot were sociologists.

Wickberg stated that he had a bias towards the West Coast, and he stated that not all parties may have satisfaction with the result.

== Contents ==
Godley wrote that "there has also been a real effort to see Canadian history from a Chinese perspective." He added that "The sins of past governments are everywhere on display" within the book so it "is clearly not a whitewash." Godley wrote that the Wickberg chapters are "[t]he heart of the book."

The sources used, including those in English and in other languages, include government documents, magazines, newspapers, and interviews of Chinese persons conducted by Harry and Ronald Con.

The authors stated that they were unable to obtain more information on the Consolidated Benevolent Association and the Kuomintang, and therefore the book has more information on the newer Chinese associations compared to the CBA and KMT.

=== Chapters ===
The book is organized in a chronological manner. The first portion is an opening chapter. Part 1, covering chapters 2–5, was written by Willmott. He discusses the beginning of the Chinese community in Canada and discrimination against the Chinese, spanning the years 1858–1911. Part 2 and Part 3 each have four chapters. The former discusses 1911-1923 and the latter discusses the post-immigration exclusion Chinese community. Wickberg wrote chapters 6–14. Part 4, spanning 5 chapters, discusses the post-World War II Chinese community. Graham Johnson wrote the four chapters after Wickberg's.

=== Reference material ===
There are around 50 pages of tables. Michael R. Godley of Monash University wrote that the tables "alone, justify the price of purchase." It has appendices listing Chinese organizations, including those that were defunct at the time of publishing, and also a bibliography of individuals. About 30 of the tables are included with the appendices. The appendices include hanzi, pinyin, Wade-Giles, and Meyer-Wempe forms of names. There are also maps, an index, a bilingual glossary, and a trilingual bibliography. Patricia E. Roy of the University of Victoria stated that the lack of dates reduces the usefulness of some of the maps and "Unfortunately the material has not always been systematically collected or presented."

== Reception ==
Chan wrote, "This book is a welcome addition to the growing literature on the Chinese in North America." Chan's criticisms were that it included more information than necessary and also was redundant in places.

In a book review for the China Quarterly, Lucie Cheng wrote that the book was both strengthened and weakened by its "comprehensiveness" since "By trying to give us too much, it ends up giving us too little."

Kashima wrote "Historians will find this an interesting and sound account which helps to fill the information gap on the Chinese in Canada."

Stanford M. Lyman of the New School for Social Research wrote that this book and Gold Mountain: The Chinese in the New World "are welcome additions to the continuing and changing Chinese phase in social science and history."

Roy wrote that it "is an impressive work of scholarship and is an essential resource for anyone doing research on the Chinese in Canada or comparing the experience of the Chinese with that of other ethnic communities." Roy stated that the footnotes have some "careless" mistakes, and that the large amount of organizations mentioned may give too much detail for the readers.
