= Vancouver Chinatown Foundation =

Non-profit organization in Vancouver, Canada

- 華埠基金
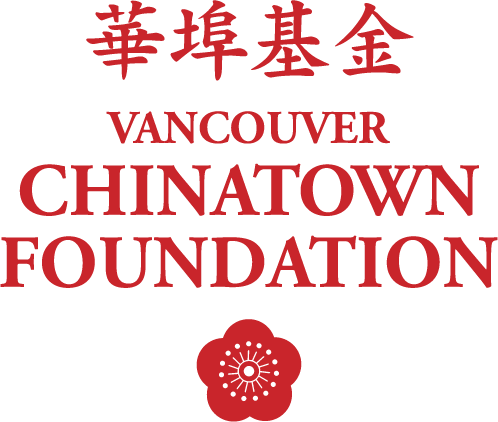
- Formation: 2011; 15 years ago
- Location: Vancouver, Canada
- Website: chinatownfoundation.org

The Vancouver Chinatown Foundation is a non-profit organization in Vancouver, British Columbia, Canada. It was founded in 2011 to revitalize the city's historic Chinatown. It is a registered charity and has received grants from the federal and provincial governments, among other donors.

One of its flagship projects is the Chinatown Storytelling Centre, where its offices are housed.
