= Women's shelter =

Place of temporary protection and support for women

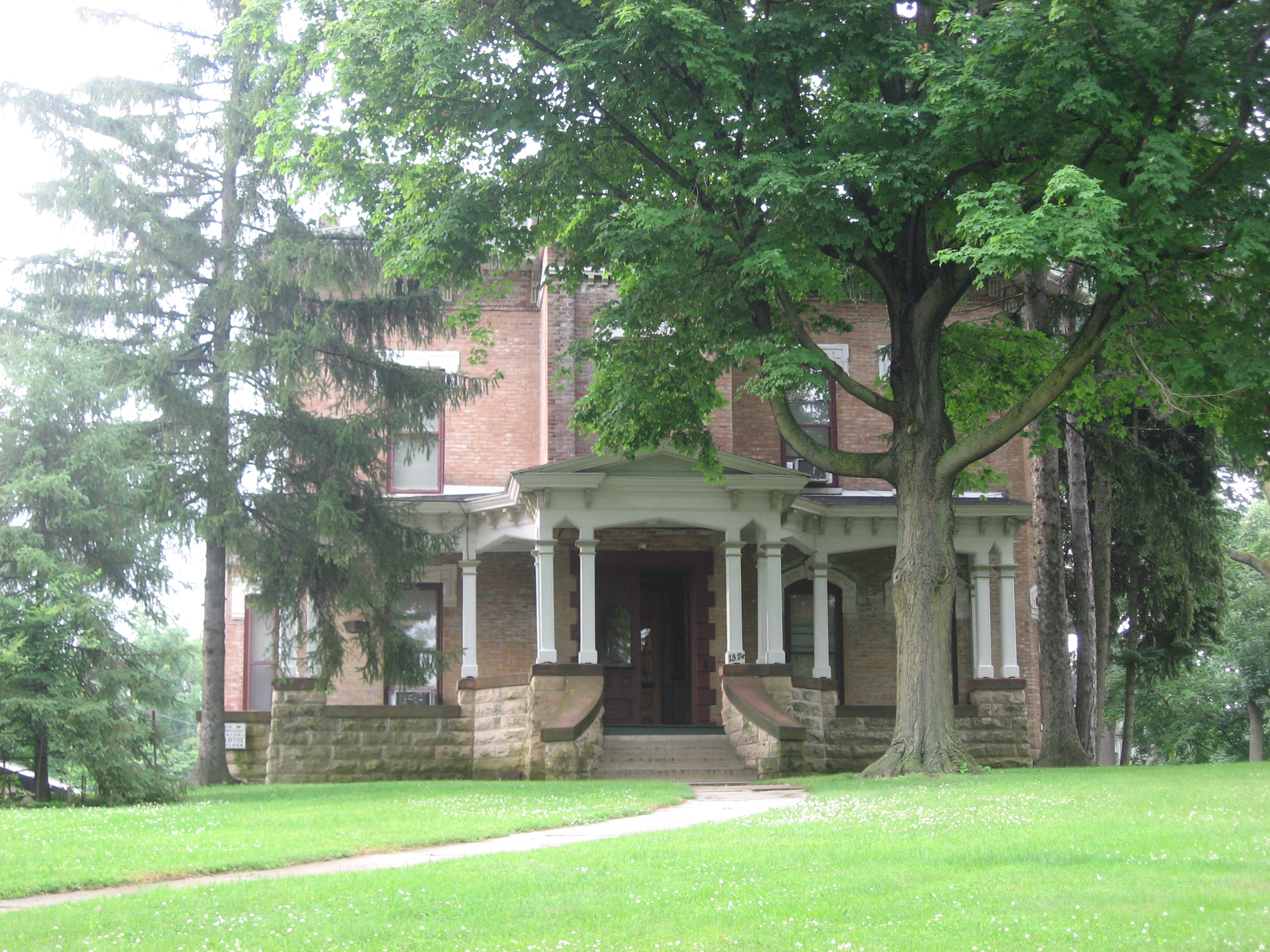
Pringle-Patric House in the United States was built in 1877 and converted to a shelter in 1990.

A women's shelter, also known as a women's refuge and battered women's shelter, is a place of temporary protection and support for women escaping domestic violence and intimate partner violence of all forms. The term is also frequently used to describe a location for the same purpose that is open to people of all genders at risk.

Representative data samples done by the Centers for Disease Control and Prevention show that one in three women in the U.S. will experience physical violence during their lifetime. One in ten will experience sexual violence. Women's shelters help individuals escape these instances of domestic violence and intimate partner violence and act as a place for protection as they choose how to move forward. Additionally, many shelters offer a variety of other services to help women and their children including counseling and legal guidance.

The ability to escape is valuable for women subjected to domestic violence or intimate partner violence. Additionally, such situations frequently involve an imbalance of power that limits the victim's financial options when they want to leave. Shelters help women gain tangible resources to help them and their families create a new life. Lastly, shelters are valuable to battered women because they can help them find a sense of empowerment.

Women's shelters are available in more than forty-five countries. They are supported with government resources as well as non-profit funds. Additionally, many philanthropists also help and support these institutions.

== History ==
=== Asia ===
Offering shelter to abused women is not a new concept in Asia. In feudal Japan, Buddhist temples known as Kakekomi Dera acted as locations where abused women could take shelter before filing for divorce. However, a formal system was not established until 1993, when the grassroots women's movement of Japan built the first shelter. Today, there are thirty shelters throughout the country.

A similar history did not lead to as much progress in China. Women's shelters did not exist until the 1990s and since then the country only opened a small number. In Beijing there are no shelters for the 20 million residents.

=== Australia ===
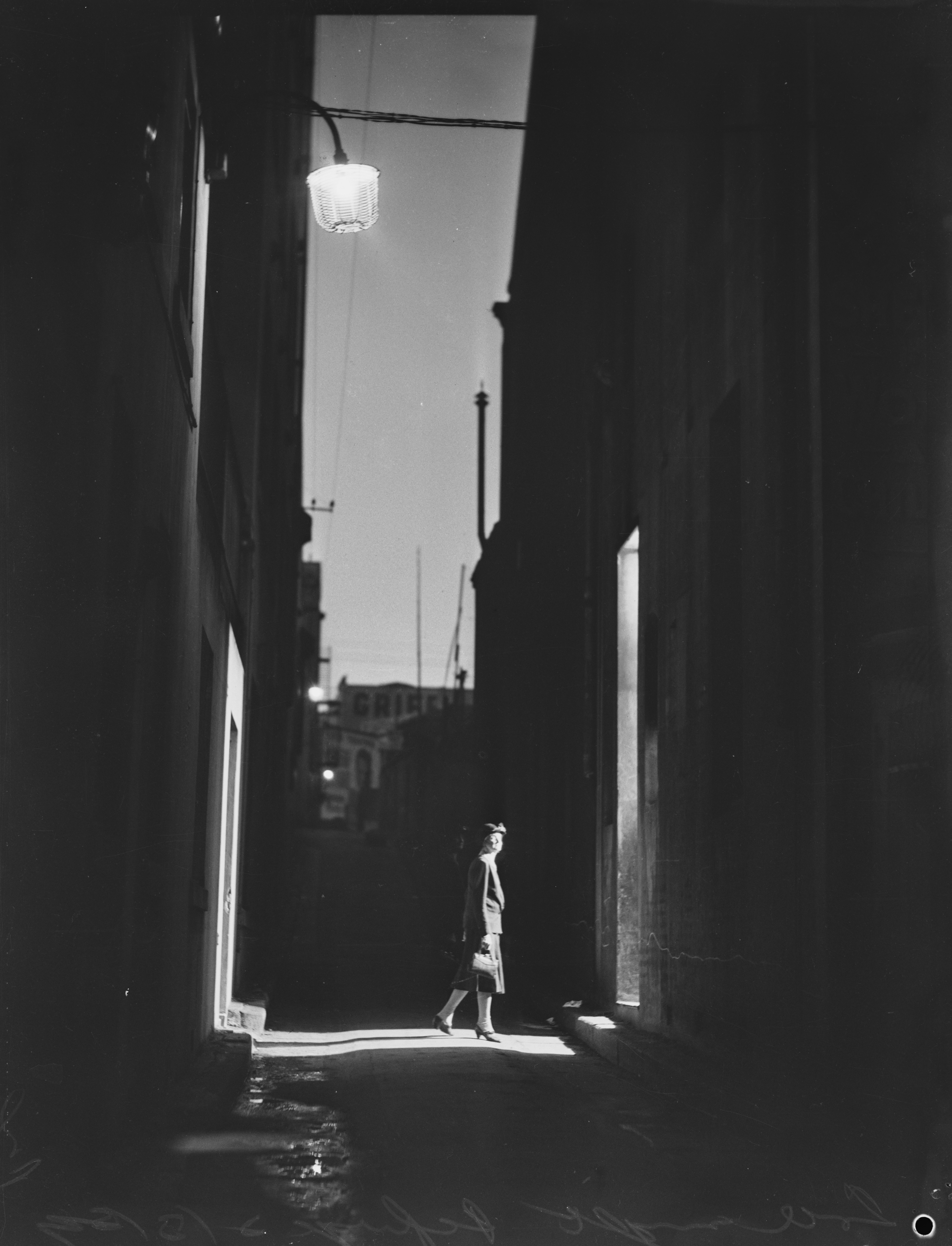
Sydney Free Shelter for Woman and children, Surrey Hills, Sydney, 1939

In Australia, the first women's refuge, known as Elsie Refuge, was opened in Glebe, New South Wales, in 1974 by a group of women's liberation activists. Many others followed, with 11 established around the country by the middle of 1975 and many more to follow. Initially these services were entirely reliant on volunteer efforts and donations from the community, but they subsequently secured government funding under the Whitlam government. However, government policy has recently seen some moves to dismantle the women's refuge movement, so that in New South Wales since 2014 the management of many refuges has been handed over to large religious agencies so that they now often operate as generic homeless services rather than specifically catering to women and children escaping domestic violence.

=== Austria ===
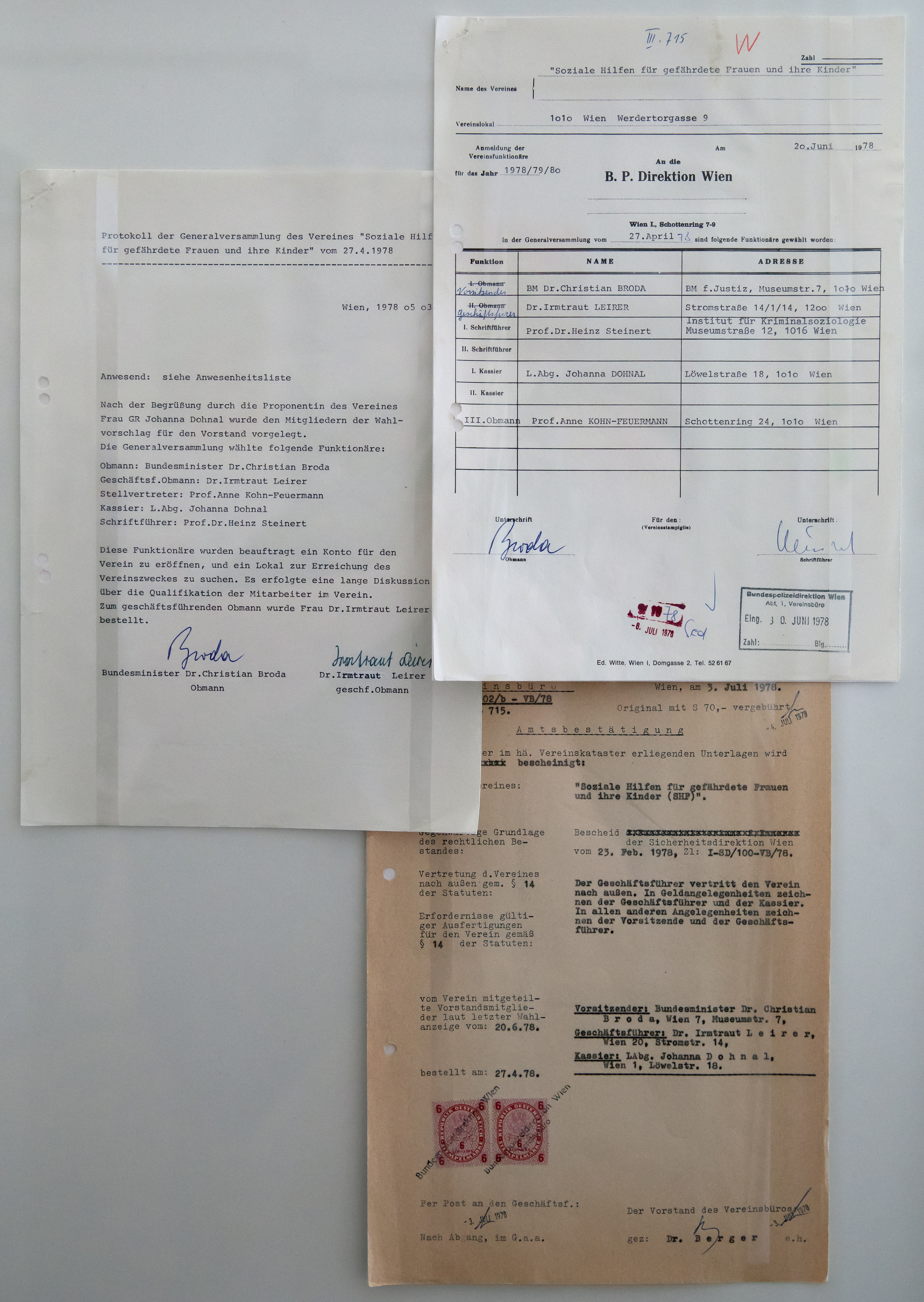
Founding documents of the Social Aid for Vulnerable Women and Children association (1978), which created Vienna's first women's shelter

The first women's shelter in Austria opened in Vienna on 1 November 1978; it was immediately overcrowded. The second Viennese women's shelter, to which an advice centre was attached, followed in February 1980. Graz housed the first women's shelter outside the capital on 12 December 1981, and Innsbruck on 16 December 1981. While the financing of the women's shelters in Vienna was secured from the outset by the municipality, the autonomous initiatives in the other states had to fight for their financial resources, sometimes with many setbacks, and often request subsidies from several places each year.

As of April 2020, there are 29 women's shelters in Austria; 15 of them are connected to the Verein Autonome Österreichische Frauenhäuser (Autonomous Austrian Women's Shelters Association).

=== Canada ===
The very first women's shelter in Canada was started in 1965 by the Harbour Rescue Mission (now Mission Services) in Hamilton, Ontario. It was named Inasmuch House, with the name referencing a Bible verse (Matthew 25:40) quoting Jesus Christ as saying "Inasmuch as you have done it for the least of these, you have done it for me." It was designed to be a practical outworking of Christian values relating to justice and care. Although originally conceived as a shelter for women leaving prison, its clientele later became women escaping abuse by their partners. The concept of Inasmuch House was shared with other Christian inner-city missions across North America and led to the opening of other such shelters.

The first shelters in Canada developed from a feminist perspective were started by Interval House, Toronto in April 1973, and the Ishtar Women’s Resource Society in Langley, British Columbia.blog Edmonton Women's Shelter (later WIN House) – a group from all walks of life, and secular as well as Christian beliefs – was opened in January 1970 to shelter any woman who needed shelter for any reason. These homes were grassroots organizations that lived on short term grants at first, with staff often working sacrificially in order to keep the houses running to ensure women's safety.

From there, the movement in Canada grew, with women's shelters opening under a variety of names - often as a Transition House or Interval House - opening up across the country in order to help women flee from abusive situations. The Alberta Council of Women's Shelters was founded in 1983. The Transition House Association of Nova Scotia, which runs shelters in Halifax, Nova Scotia, was founded a few years later in 1989.

ACWS became a founding member of Women's Shelters Canada and also hosted the first ever world conference of women's shelters in Edmonton in 2008. The conference included 800 delegates from 60 countries. The world conference is now a separate organisation with a fourth world conference set to take place in Taipei in 2019. In February 2019 ACWS hosted the first Western Canadian violence-prevention conference, the 'Leading Change Summit: Bold Conversations to end gender-based violence' which included Dr. Michael Flood (QUB) and actor and activist Terry Crews, as well as 230 delegates from community organisations, trade unions, government and corporates committed to ending domestic violence.

The shelter Chez Doris in Montreal, Canada, offers services in English, French, and Inuktitut. Servants Anonymous Society (SAS) provides aid and shelter to women exiting the sex industry.

Canada's longest running rape crisis centre is the Vancouver Rape Relief & Women's Shelter.

=== Ethiopia ===
In 2003 the initial women's shelter opened its doors under the Association for Women's Sanctuary and Development (AWSAD) in Addis Ababa. In 2019 AWSAD opened sanctuaries for victims of sexual violence in war-torn northern Ethiopia with support from the United Nations Development Programme.

=== France ===
When a rise in domestic violence occurred during the COVID-19 pandemic in France, the French Government invested 1 million euros in establishing 20 new help centres throughout the country located near supermarkets, where victims can go while going out for groceries, and be redirected to dozens of hotel rooms that functioned as temporary shelters paid for by the government.

=== Germany ===
The first shelter for battered women was opened in West Berlin in 1976, created by women of the autonomous women's movement with funds from the FRG's Ministry of Family Affairs. The Berlin project triggered a wave of women's shelters foundations, which were granted financial aid on the basis of Paragraph 72 of the Federal Social Aid Law. For example, the city council of Cologne decided in December 1976 to finance the women's shelter set up by a social worker. In subsequent years, women's shelters were founded in other German cities. Most of them were projects of the autonomous women's movement.

Parties shall take the necessary legislative or other measures to provide for the setting-up of
appropriate, easily accessible shelters in sufficient numbers to provide safe accommodation
for and to reach out pro-actively to victims, especially women and their children.

— Article 23: Shelters, Istanbul Convention

Since the Gewaltschutzgesetz ("Protection from Violence Law") entered into force on 1 January 2002, according to which violent offenders can be expelled from the residence, the need and number of women's shelters have decreased. In 2002 there were approximately 400 women's shelters in Germany, of which 153 were autonomous. According to a study published in 2012 on behalf of the Ministry of Family Affairs, 15,000 women, accompanied by 17,000 children, sought refuge in the then around 350 women's shelters and 40 protection homes in 2011. However, women had to be turned away 9,000 times because the facilities were full. In 2013, 34,000 women and children sought refuge in facilities, but once again 9,000 women had to be rejected.

According to the allocation formula of the Istanbul Convention (Article 23), which Germany ratified in October 2017 and entered into force there in February 2018, there was a nationwide shortage of 14,600 women's shelters. In accordance with the coalition agreement, the CDU/CSU and the SPD have announced an action programme to support women affected by violence and a round table evaluation by the federal, state and local authorities on the subject in order to ensure the needs-based expansion and adequate financial security of women's shelters and corresponding advice centre.

=== Iran ===
Behzisti has Health houses, Social intervention center and safehouses may offer 20 days of service and after that may offer permanently care for maximum of 6 months. There are two in Mashhad and Arak has one. Isfahan has a rehab center. Women must be no less than 15 years of age. IRGC and Tehran municipality have center of women who were formerly addicts in east of city. They have emergency telephone number people can dial 123. Sanandaj has one building with capacity of 60 people.

=== Iraq ===
Yanar Mohammed launched the Organization of Women's Freedom in Iraq (OWFI), a group active in supporting women's rights since the U.S.-led invasion; the OWFI set up women's shelters and safe houses to protect women threatened by domestic abuse and honor killings, including the first women's shelter in Iraq, founded in 2003.

=== Italy ===
The first shelter for battered women in Italy was opened in 1989 in Bologna, Casa delle donne per non subire violenza, by a feminist group of women, with one secret apartment and a public counselling centre.

=== Mexico ===
In Mexico City, local law allows the government to force the abuser to leave the home instead of the victim, even if the property is owned or rented in the name of the abuser, thus making the home a sort of shelter in itself. This law was supported by Claudia Sheinbaum, who later became president of Mexico.

=== Netherlands ===
In the Netherlands, women's shelters emerged in the 1970s as blijf-van-mijn-lijfhuizen (literally: "keep-[your-hands-]off-my-body houses"). Their locations were kept secret, but especially since the emergence of digital technology in the 1990s, the secrecy of the locations proved to be almost impossible to maintain. Moreover, some women were still not able to completely cut off all communication with their (former) partners and secretly sought contact with them anyway, leaving them vulnerable without the shelter's oversight. To address these issues, the remaining blijf-van-mijn-lijfhuizen gradually converted to so-called Oranje Huizen ("Orange Houses") in the 2000s and 2010s, whose location is not secret, but they do have permanent security for survivors, and they allow for safe contact between survivor and (ex-)partner if both parties are interested in it. These restyled shelters are still commonly known as blijf-van-mijn-lijfhuizen.

=== United Kingdom ===
In England in 1971, Erin Pizzey started the first domestic violence shelter in the modern world after Haven House, which opened in 1964 in California, Chiswick Women's Aid; the organization is known today as Refuge.

Since that time almost every European country has opened shelters to help domestic violence victims. Two countries even offer shelters for particular ethnicities and cultures. Additionally, a new development in Europe is that countries like the Netherlands and Austria opened social housing for long term stays. One reason for this growth is the Istanbul Convention against Violence Against Women and Domestic Violence, a convention signed by 47 Council of Europe member states in 2011. An article in the Convention sets the creation of women's shelters as a minimum standard for compliance. Following austerity two-thirds of local authorities in England have cut funding for women's refuges since 2010.

=== United States ===
The first women's shelter in the modern world was Haven House, which opened in 1964 in California.

The first federally recognized DV shelter was an early women's shelter in the United States, Emergency Shelter Program Inc. (now Restorative Pathways), was established in Hayward, California, in 1971 by a local group of women who attended church together. Betty Moose, one of the founding members, officially incorporated the shelter in March 8th 1971, now International Woman's Day. Shortly after the founding members established a local domestic violence hotline. Before the shelter was officially open volunteers housed women in their own homes. Other women’s shelters soon popped up around the United States which include Rosie's Place in Boston, Massachusetts, which was opened in 1974 by Kip Tiernan, and the Atlanta Union Mission in Atlanta, opened by Elsie Huck.

Women's shelters evolved over time. Grassroots community advocates in the 1970s offered shelters as one of the first services for victims of intimate partner violence. At this time, most shelters were for emergencies and involved stays less than six months. Volunteers and shelter workers offered legal and welfare referrals to women when they exited but contact afterwards was limited. More recent programs, such as those funded by the Violence Against Women Act, offer longer term stays for women. These locations, as well as transitional housing, offer more services to women and their children. Another recent change is the increasing amount of shelters publicizing their locations to increase funding and visibility in the community.

Due to the growing women's movement, the number of shelters quickly increased after their induction and by 1977 the United States had eighty-nine shelters available for victims of violence. By 2000, the United States had over 2,000 domestic violence programs in place, many with domestic violence shelters included.

== Services ==
=== General purpose ===
Women's shelters offer temporary refuge for women escaping acts of domestic violence or intimate partner violence. Many women become homeless in this situation because they are financially dependent on their abuser and these resources help to incentivize and support escape. The average length of stay for women is between thirty and sixty days in the United States. However, this varies in different countries and in Europe, for example, four countries limit stays to a few weeks. Transitional housing, another form of women's shelter, offers stays of up to a year while certain communities offer public and private housing for even longer periods.

=== Utilization ===
There is high demand for shelter services in the United States. A one-day national census done by the National Network to End Domestic Violence found that emergency shelters served over 66,581 people in one day and over 9,000 requests could not be met during the same period. In Europe there is a similar pattern of over-demand. Utilization by women is not consistent across the population of intimate partner violence victims, however. Women with children tend to use shelters more often as well as those that are injured physically. Additionally, rural women have more trouble accessing services due to isolation and a lack of resources.

=== Other services offered ===
Shelters are usually offered as part of a comprehensive domestic violence program that can also include a crisis hotline, services for non-sheltered children, an education program, a community speaker list, and an offender treatment program. Shelters themselves also offer a variety of services. They provide counseling, support groups and skills workshops to help women move on independently. These act as tools of empowerment for women in conjunction with goal setting programs. Lastly, they offer support for children as well as legal and medical advocacy.

Most residents of women's shelters are the children of women who are victims of violence. This is one reason why more than half of shelters offered services to this portion of the population in a survey of 215 shelters in the United States. Services for children often include counseling and group therapy options that are meant to strengthen parent-child relationships and help with mental well-being. Recently, shelters also responded to increasing numbers of male victims by offering help mostly in the form of hotel vouchers.

=== Male residents ===
In the United States, certain shelters do not permit access to men. This practice was challenged in Blumhorst v. Haven Hills, a court case in California (Los Angeles Superior Court Case No. BC291977). However, the court dismissed the case because the plaintiff lacked standing – he was not involved in an abusive relationship and did not need shelter. Certain groups are critical of the smaller amount of resources available to men in the United States and across the world. However, other sources dispute the view that male-only refuges are wanted or needed by most male victims, arguing that the issue has been misrepresented out of misogyny rather than genuine concern for male victims. The Istanbul Convention, for example, states that the creation of women's shelters is not discriminatory.

Some shelters do permit access today, including the Domestic Abuse Project (DAP) of Delaware County, which offers services to both sexes. According to their own reports, around three percent of DAP supported individuals have been men. In the United Kingdom, 100 places were opened to house male victims of domestic violence in Northamptonshire, or to house families barred from other shelters, such as women with older male children. In Canada, approximately 8 percent of women's shelters are also open to adult men.

== Funding ==
=== United States ===
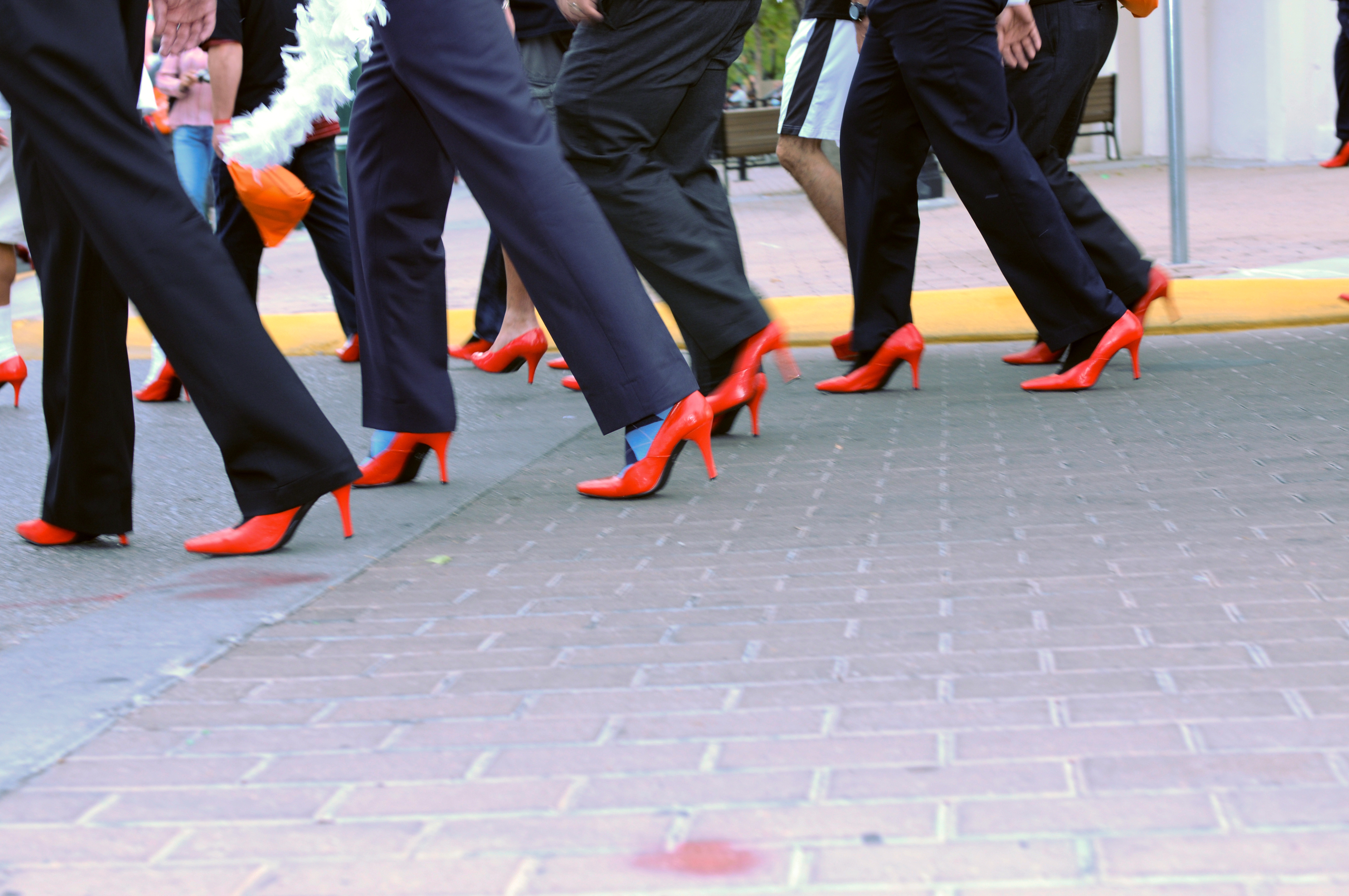
Volunteers in El Paso, October 16, 2012, supporting a Walk a Mile in Her Shoes event to raise funds for the YWCA's Independence House.

Women's shelters in the United States are supported at a state and national level. Over 50% of the funding offered at the state level, however, comes from the federal government through grants. Services are generally administered through Domestic Violence Intervention Programs (DVIPs) funded by the Family Violence Services Act, the Victims of Crime Act of 1984, and the Violence Against Women Act. Various non-profits also contribute to the services offered and provide a national voice for the issue. Examples include the National Network to End Domestic Violence which represents fifty-six U.S. states and territories, the National Organization for Victim Assistance, and local United Ways.

Reports show that on any day over 5,000 women are unable to use services because of a lack of funding or space. Many states have also cut their funds for women's shelters. In 2009, Governor Schwarzenegger of California cut $16,000 in state funding to domestic violence programs because of the state's budget deficit. In late 2011 Washington governor Christine Gregoire released a budget proposal stripping all state funding for domestic violence and women's shelters across Washington State. These types of budget cuts caused several shelters to close their doors, leaving women with no safe haven to escape Intimate partner violence. Local communities are now also taking it upon themselves to create a safe place for domestic violence refugees. In Grand Forks, British Columbia, a small community of less than 3,600, people organized the Boundary Women's Coalition, to support their local women's shelter.

==== Grant examples ====
Many grants help fund women's shelters in the United States.

Grant title	Source	Qualifications	Purpose
STOP Violence Against Women Formula Grant Program	Office on Violence Against Women	Available to states and territories	Thirty percent of funds provided are to improve on services available to victims of intimate partner violence.
State and Territorial Sexual Assault and Domestic Violence Coalitions Program	Office on Violence Against Women	Available for domestic violence coalitions	Funds provided to each state's domestic violence coalition to improve the coordination of services available in each state. These coalitions give funds directly to shelters.
Grants to Tribal Domestic Violence and Sexual Assault Coalitions Program	Office on Violence Against Women	Available to tribal domestic violence coalitions.	Funds provided to support tribal domestic violence coalitions that offer services to under-served populations.
Family Violence Prevention and Services Discretionary Grants: National and Special Issue Resource Centers	Administration for Children and Families	Nonprofits with or without 501(c)(3) status; Native American tribal organizations	Funds provided to start individual National Resource Centers on Domestic Violence.
OVC FY 16 Vision 21: Enhancing Access and Attitudinal Changes in Domestic Violence Shelters for Individuals with Disabilities	Office for Victims of Crime	State and regional domestic violence coalitions	Funds provided to help shelters make facilities accessible to those with disabilities.

== Effects ==
Women often suffer lasting mental conditions from their abuse including anxiety disorders, depression, and posttraumatic stress disorders (PTSD). Since women in shelters have more likely experienced severe physical and mental abuse than those who do not utilize these services, they are also more likely to experience PTSD. In fact, an American national organizational survey compiled four separate studies of female support group or shelter users and reported PTSD rates between 45% and 84% (Astin, Lawrence, Pincus, & Foy, 1990; Houskamp & Foy, 1991; Roberts, 1996a; Saunders, 1994). These emotional and mental consequences have an effect on women's career opportunities and ability to function in normal life. Women's shelters try to counteract these effects as well as prevent future instances of abuse. However, PTSD can prohibit women from utilizing shelter resources effectively.

Shelter utilization may lead to the better functioning of survivors and fewer reports of abuse in the short term. Research that studied 3,410 residents of 215 domestic violence across the United States linked longer shelter stays with increased well-being and better help-seeking behaviors. The latter is a result of increased knowledge about services and options available to women in vulnerable positions as well as increased empowerment. This may indicate that transition services and longer residential offerings are more valuable.

=== Criticism ===
Many women report re-abuse after leaving a shelter. A sample study done by Bybee and Sullivan, which analyzed data from 124 victims who utilized shelters, found no positive effect on re-abuse three years after shelter use. Additionally, with current resource restraints in the United States, standard shelters do not provide the PTSD or psychotherapeutic treatments necessary for full support. They may also have issues with under-serving the community because of a shortage of funded staff, a lack of bilingual staff, and inadequate facilities.

Shelters in Europe are similarly limited and only eight countries fulfill the minimum standards for shelters set by the Istanbul Convention. Another criticism of the shelters in Europe is that they have strict age limits that keep male children out and certain shelters discriminate against women from other countries or who identify as lesbian or transgender.

== See also ==
- Refuge, a United Kingdom anti-domestic violence charity
- Victimology
- Women-only space
- Women's police station
- Woman's Exchange Movement
