= Greater Boston Food Bank =

Non-profit organization in the US

The Greater Boston Food Bank
- Founded: 1981
- Founder: Kip Tiernan
- Purpose: Hunger relief
- Location: Boston, Massachusetts
- Region served: Eastern Massachusetts
- Key people: Catherine D'Amato (CEO)
- Website: www.gbfb.org

The Greater Boston Food Bank (GBFB), located in Boston, Massachusetts, is a non-profit organization that serves more than 500,000 people each year through a network of nearly 600 member hunger-relief agencies throughout eastern Massachusetts. The Food Bank's current President and CEO is Catherine D'Amato. The Greater Boston Food Bank is a member organization of Feeding America, formerly known as America's Second Harvest.

== Services ==
The Greater Boston Food Bank provides hunger relief to an estimated 500,000 people annually, according to "Hunger in Eastern Massachusetts 2014", a study that was part of a national initiative spearheaded by Feeding America. According to this study, about a third (125,000) of the members of the households served by GBFB had children under the age of 18, and approximately 20% of clients at program sites served by The Greater Food Bank were age 65 and older. 72% of households needed to use a food pantry on a regular basis to have enough to eat.

== History ==
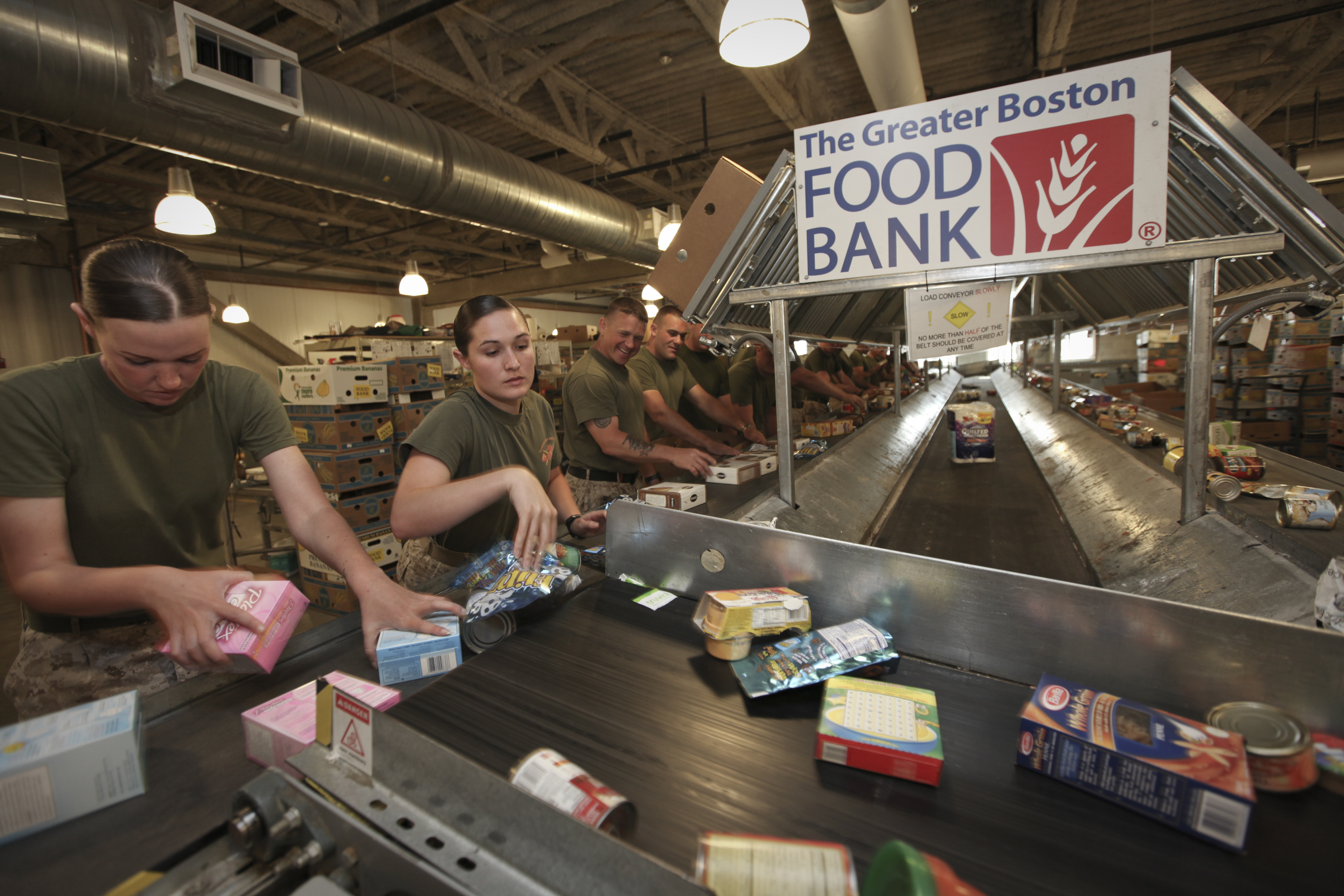
Officers of the Mobilization Command United States Marine Corps Reserve providing assistance to the Greater Boston Food Bank during a volunteer drive

The Boston Food Bank was founded by Kip Tiernan and legally incorporated in 1981. It was originally located at 71 Amory Street in the Jamaica Plain section of Boston and moved to 99 Atkinson Street in the Newmarket section of Boston in 1992. The Boston Food Bank officially changed its name to The Greater Boston Food Bank in 1993.

The Greater Boston Food Bank broke ground in 2007 at the 2.8-acre (11,000 m^{2}) site of a new facility at 70 South Bay Ave (the former home of the South Bay Incinerator), across the street from the organization's previous location. The facility was completed in March 2009. The 117,000-square-foot (10,900 m^{2}) facility, named the Yawkey Distribution Center of The Greater Boston Food Bank will enable The Greater Boston Food Bank to increase its distribution to eventually accommodate 50 million pounds of food and grocery products.

== See also ==
- List of food banks
