= Press Gang (disambiguation) =

Press Gang is a British children's television series.

Press Gang may also refer to:

- Press gang or impressment, the practice of pressing men into military service
- Press Gang (comics), a fictional group in the Marvel Comics universe
- Press Gang Publishers, a Canadian book publishing company
