= City of Vancouver Book Award =

Canadian literary award

- Description: Annual literary award presented to works of fiction, non-fiction, poetry, or drama about Vancouver
- Location: Vancouver, British Columbia
- Country: Canada
- Presented by: City of Vancouver

The City of Vancouver Book Award is a Canadian literary award, that has been presented annually by the city of Vancouver, British Columbia to one or more works of literature judged as the year's best fiction, non-fiction, poetry or drama work about the city.

== Criteria and selection ==
As with the City of Toronto Book Award, the award may go to one or more books. The award has a monetary value of $3,000. The prize is funded by interest earned from the city's publishing reserve, which was established in 1977 as a permanent legacy for writers and publishers. The fund received royalties generated from Vancouver's First Century: A Photo History of Vancouver, edited by city staff. The third edition of the book, renamed Vancouver: A City Album, or many years generated royalty payments for the fund.

== Honorees ==
City of Vancouver Book Award winners and finalists
Year	Author	Title	Result	Ref.
1989 (Note: The 1989 jurors were Jean Barman, Russell Kelly, and Doreen Westgarth.)	Paul Yee	Saltwater City: An Illustrated History of the Chinese in Vancouver	Winner	
1990	Sky Lee	Disappearing Moon Cafe	Winner	
1990	Rosemary Brown	Being Brown: A Very Public Life	Finalist	
1990	Stan Persky	Buddy's: Meditations on Desire	Finalist	
1990	John Schreiner	The Refiners: A Century of BC Sugar	Finalist	
1991 (Note: The 1991 jurors were Sue Baptie, Sean Rossiter, and Don Stewart.)	Michael Kluckner	Vanishing Vancouver	Winner	
1991	Cyril Leonoff	Leonard Frank: An Enterprising Life	Finalist	
1991	Robin Ward	Robin Ward's Vancouver	Finalist	
1992 (Note: The 1992 jurors were Jean Barman, Janice Douglas, and Margaret Gabriel.)	Gerald Straley	Trees of Vancouver: A Guide to the Common and Unusual Trees of the City	Winner	
1992	Elizabeth Bower	No Forwarding Address	Finalist	
1992	Gregory Edwards	Hidden Cities	Finalist	
1992	Paul Grescoe	Flesh Wound	Finalist	
1992	Timothy Oke and Graeme Wynn	Vancouver and Its Regions	Finalist	
1993 (Note: The 1993 jurors were Gordon Elliott, John Oliphant, and Lucy Stewart.)	Bruce Macdonald	Vancouver: A Visual History	Winner	
1993	Irene Howard	The Struggle for Social Justice in British Columbia	Finalist	
1993	Michael Kluckner and John Atkin	Heritage Walks Around Vancouver	Finalist	
1994 (Note: The 1994 jurors were Andrea Davies, Chuck Davis, and Bruce Macdonald.)	Denise Chong	The Concubine's Children	Winner	
1994	Paul Grescoe and Karl Spreitz	Vancouver: Visions of a City	Finalist	
1994	Robin Ward	Robin Ward's Heritage West Coast	Finalist	
1994	Michael J. Yates	Line Screw	Finalist	
1995 (Note: The 1995 jurors were Irene Howard, Nancy Stubbs, and Greg Willett.)	Elspeth Cameron	Earle Birney: A Life	Winner	
1995	Lois Simmie and Cynthia Nugent	Mister Got to Go	Finalist	
1995	Ulli Stelzer and Robert Davidson	Eagle Transforming: The Art of Robert Davidson	Finalist	
1996 (Note: The 1996 jurors were Mary Ann Cantillon, Irene Howard, and Brahm Kornbluth.)	Wayson Choy	The Jade Peony	Winner	
1996	Grant Buday	Monday Night Man	Finalist	
1996	Robert A. J. McDonald	Making Vancouver: Class, Status & Social Boundaries 1863-1913	Finalist	
1997 (Note: The 1997 jurors were Laura Hackett, Judy Taylor, and Anne Yandle.)	Rhodri Windsor Liscombe	The New Spirit: Modern Architecture in Vancouver, 1938-1963	Winner	
1997	John A. Cherrington	Vancouver at the Dawn: A Turn-of-the-Century Portrait	Finalist	
1997	Fred Thirkell and Bob Scullion	Postcards from the Past: Edwardian Images of Greater Vancouver and the Fraser Valley	Finalist	
1998 (Note: The 1998 jurors were Donna Brendon, Ian Chunn, and Vickie Jensen.)	Chuck Davis	The Greater Vancouver Book: An Urban Encyclopaedia	Winner	
1998	Betty O'Keefe and Ian Macdonald	The Mulligan Affair: Top Cop on the Take	Finalist	
1998	Carmen Rodríguez	And a Body to Remember With	Finalist	
1999 (Note: The 1999 jurors were Mark Leier, Bob Sarti, and Joseph Stewart.)	Bud Osborn	Keys to Kingdoms	Winner	
1999	Shawn Blore and the editors of Vancouver Magazine	Vancouver: Secrets of the City	Finalist	
1999	Grant Buday	White Lung	Finalist	
2000 (Note: The 2000 jurors were Shamina Senaratne, Nina Smart, and Joseph Stewart.)	Lilia D'Acres and Donald Luxton	Lions Gate	Winner	
2000	Christine Allen and Collin Varner	Gardens of Vancouver	Finalist	
2000	Wayson Choy	Paper Shadows: A Chinatown Childhood	Finalist	
2000	Wing Chung Ng	The Chinese in Vancouver: The Pursuit of Identity and Power, 1945-80	Finalist	
2001 (Note: The 2001 jurors were Brenda Peterson, Shamina Senaratne, and Don Stewart.)	Madeleine Thien	Simple Recipes	Winner	
2001	Douglas Coupland	City of Glass: Douglas Coupland's Vancouver	Finalist	
2001	Timothy Taylor	Stanley Park	Finalist	
2001	Gary Wyatt (ed.)	Susan Point: Coast Salish Artist	Finalist	
2002 (Note: The 2002 jurors were Brenda Peterson, Denise Ryan, and Michael Varty.)	Keith Carlson	A Sto:lo-Coast Salish Historical Atlas	Winner	
2002	Doreen Armitage	Burrard Inlet: A History	Finalist	
2002	Bart Campbell	The Door is Open: Memoir of a Soup Kitchen Volunteer	Finalist	
2002	Cynthia Flood	Making a Stone of the Heart	Finalist	
2003 (Note: The 2003 jurors were George Fetherling, Michael Varty, and Anne Yandle.)	Lincoln Clarkes, Ken Dietrich-Campbell, Patricia Canning and Elaine Allan	Heroines	Winner	
2003	Reid Shier (ed.)	Stan Douglas: Every Building on 100 Block West Hastings	Winner	
2003	John J. Clague and Bob Turner	Vancouver, City on the Edge: Living with a Dynamic Geological Landscape	Finalist	
2003	Fiona Tinwei Lam	Intimate Distances	Finalist	
2004 (Note: The 2004 jurors were Crystal Allen, Keith Bunnell, and George Fetherling.)	Daniel Francis	L.D.: Mayor Louis Taylor and the Rise of Vancouver	Winner	
2004	Annabel Lyon	The Best Thing for You	Finalist	
2004	Paul Yee	The Bone Collector's Son	Finalist	
2004	Caroline Adderson	Sitting Practice	Honourable mention	
2004	John Punter	The Vancouver Achievement: Urban Planning and Design	Honourable mention	
2004	Maggie de Vries	Missing Sarah: A Vancouver Woman Remembers Her Vanished Sister	Honourable mention	
2005 (Note: The 2005 jurors were Keith Bunnell, Laurie Roggeman, and Max Wyman.)	Lance Berelowitz	Dream City: Vancouver and the Global Imagination	Winner	
2005	Wayson Choy	All That Matters	Finalist	
2005	Leslie Robertson and Dara Culhane (eds.)	In Plain Sight: Reflections on Life in Downtown Eastside Vancouver	Finalist	
2005	Various	The Vancouver Stories: West Coast Fiction from Canada's Best Writers	Finalist	
2006 (Note: The 2006 jurors were Rod Clarke, Glenn Deer, and Laurie Roggeman.)	Jean Barman	Stanley Park's Secret: The Forgotten Families of Whoi Whoi, Kanaka Ranch, and Brockton Point	Winner	
2006	James P. Delgado	Waterfront: The Illustrated Maritime History of Greater Vancouver	Winner	
2006	Derek Hayes	Historical Atlas of Vancouver and the Lower Fraser Valley	Finalist	
2006	Abraham J. Rogatnick, Ian M. Thom, and Adele Weder	B.C. Binning	Finalist	
2007 (Note: The 2007 jurors were Glenn Deer, Marc Fournier, and Karen X. Tulchinsky.)	Michael Kluckner	Vancouver Remembered	Winner	
2007	Grant Arnold and Michael Turner	Fred Herzog: Vancouver Photographs	Finalist	
2007	Anita Rau Badami	Can You Hear the Nightbird Call?	Finalist	
2007	Brett Josef Grubisic	The Age of Cities	Finalist	
2008 (Note: The 2008 jurors were Michelle Benjamin, Marc Fournier, and Fernanda Viveiros.)	Brad Cran and Gillian Jerome	Hope in Shadows: Stories and Photographs of Vancouver's Downtown Eastside	Winner	
2008	Gary Geddes	Falsework	Finalist	
2008	Eve Lazarus	At Home With History: The Untold Secrets of Greater Vancouver's Heritage Homes	Finalist	
2008	Kaija Pepper	The Man Next Door Dances: The Art of Peter Bingham	Finalist	
2009 (Note: The 2009 jurors were Janice Douglas, Fred Wah, and Fernanda Viveiros.)	Lee Henderson	The Man Game	Winner	
2009	Gabor Maté	In the Realm of the Hungry Ghosts	Finalist	
2009	Meredith Quartermain	Nightmarker	Finalist	
2010 (Note: The 2010 jurors were Janice Douglas, Fred Wah, and Jean Wilson.)	Bruce Grenville and Scott Steedman	Visions of British Columbia	Winner	
2010	George Bowering	The Box	Finalist	
2010	Matt Hern	Common Ground in a Liquid City	Finalist	
2010	Chris MacDonald	A Guidebook to Contemporary Architecture in Vancouver	Finalist	
2011 (Note: The 2011 jurors were Emilie Dierking, Lee Henderson, and Jim Wong-Chu.)	Michael Christie	The Beggar's Garden: Stories	Winner	
2011	Lynne Bowen	Whoever Gives Us Bread: The Story of Italians in British Columbia	Finalist	
2011	Wayde Compton	After Canaan: Essays on Race, Writing, and Region	Finalist	
2011	Lesley McKnight	Vancouver Kids	Finalist	
2012 (Note: The 2012 jurors were Jane Bouey, David Chariandy, and Rebecca Wigod.)	W. H. New	YVR	Winner	
2012	John Mikhail Asfour and Elee Kraljii Gardiner (eds.)	V6A: Writing from Vancouver's Downtown Eastside	Finalist	
2012	Claudia Cornwall	At the World's Edge: Curt Lang's Vancouver	Finalist	
2012	Ali Kazimi	Undesirables: White Canada and the Komagata Maru	Finalist	
2012	Jen Sookfong Lee	The Better Mother	Finalist	
2013 (Note: The 2013 jurors were Andrea Davies, Elee Kraljii Gardiner, and Paul Whitney.)	Amber Dawn	How Poetry Saved My Life: A Hustler's Memoir	Winner	
2013	Jancis M. Andrews	The Ballad of Mrs. Smith	Finalist	
2013	Brad Cran	Ink on Paper	Finalist	
2013	Harold Kalman and Robin Ward	Exploring Vancouver: The Architectural Guide	Finalist	
2013	Sean Kheraj	Inventing Stanley Park: An Environmental History	Finalist	
2014 (Note: The 2014 jurors were Jordan Abel, Elee Kraljii Gardiner, and Anna Ling Kaye.)	David Stouck	Arthur Erickson: An Architect's Life	Winner	
2014	Bruce Grierson	What Makes Olga Run?	Finalist	
2014	Doretta Lau	How Does a Single Blade of Grass Thank the Sun?	Finalist	
2014	Ashley Little	Anatomy of a Girl Gang: A Novel	Finalist	
2014	Billeh Nickerson	Artificial Cherry	Finalist	
2015 (Note: The 2015 jurors were Anna Ling Kaye, Zoey Leigh Peterson, and Sirish Rao.)	Wayde Compton	The Outer Harbour: Stories	Winner	
2015	Aaron Chapman	Live at the Commodore: The Story of Vancouver's Historic Commodore Ballroom	Finalist	
2015	Bren Simmers	Hastings-Sunrise: Poems	Finalist	
2015	Lois Simmie and Cynthia Nugent	Mister Got To Go, Where Are You?	Finalist	
2016 (Note: The 2016 jurors were Shirley Lew, Zoey Leigh Peterson, and Mary Schendlinger.)	Lawrence Paul Yuxweluptun, Karen Duffek, and Tania Willard	Lawrence Paul Yuxweluptun: Unceded Territories	Winner	
2016	Wayde Compton and Renée Sarojini Saklikar (eds.)	The Revolving City: 51 Poems and the Stories Behind Them	Finalist	
2016	Lorimer Shenher	That Lonely Section of Hell: The Botched Investigation of a Serial Killer Who Almost Got Away	Finalist	
2017	Carleigh Baker	Bad Endings	Winner	
2017	Grant Arnold, Ian M. Thom, Susan Point, Kathryn Bunn-Marcuse, Thomas Cannell, Myrtle McKay, and William McLennan	Susan Point: Spindle Whorl	Finalist	
2017	Gabrielle Prendergast	Pandas on the Eastside	Finalist	
2017	Sam Wiebe	Invisible Dead	Finalist	
2018	Chelene Knight	Dear Current Occupant	Winner	
2018	Travis Lupick	Fighting for Space: How a Group of Drug Users Transformed One City's Struggle with Addiction	Finalist	
2018	Erín Moure	Sitting Shiva on Minto Avenue, by Toots	Finalist	
2018	Rachel Rose	Sustenance: Writers from BC and Beyond on the Subject of Food	Finalist	
2019	Robert Watt and Susan Point	People among the People: The public art of Susan Point	Winner	
2019	Phillip Huynh	The Forbidden Purple City	Finalist	
2019	Eve Lazarus	Murder by Milkshake: An Astonishing True Story of Adultery, Arsenic, and a Charismatic Killer	Finalist	
2019	Susin Nielsen	No Fixed Address	Finalist	
2019	Shazia Hafiz Ramji	Port of Being	Finalist	
2020	Catherine B. Clement	Chinatown Through a Wide Lens: The Hidden Photographs of Yucho Chow	Winner	
2020	Francine Cunningham	on/me	Finalist	
2020	Alex Leslie	Vancouver for Beginners	Finalist	
2021	Michelle Good	Five Little Indians	Winner	
2021	Joseph Dandurand	The East Side of It All	Finalist	
2021	Danny Ramadan and Anna Bron	Salma the Syrian Chef	Finalist	
2021	Marlene Yuen	Ho Sun Hing Printers	Honourable mention	
2022	Karen Duffek, Bill McLennan, and Jordan Wilson	Where the Power Is: Indigenous Perspectives on Northwest Coast Art	Winner	
2022	Meghan Bell	Erase and Rewind	Finalist	
2022	Henry Doyle	No Shelter	Finalist	
2022	Grace Eiko Thomson	Chiru Sakura: Falling Cherry Blossoms	Finalist	
2022	Paul Wong	Debbie Cheung & Christopher Lee, Occupying Chinatown	Finalist	
2023	Chelene Knight	Junie	Winner	
2023	Evelyn Lau	Cactus Gardens	Finalist	
2023	Michele Assarasakorn, Nathan Fairbairn	PAWS: Mindy Makes Some Space	Finalist	
2023	Danny Ramadan	The Foghorn Echoes	Finalist	
2023	Tara McGuire	Holden After and Before: Love Letter for a Son Lost to Overdose	Finalist	
2023	Jan Wade, Deanna Bowen, Wayde Compton, Daina Augaitis, Siobhan McCracken Nixon	Jan Wade: Soul Power	Finalist	
2024	Henry Tsang	White Riot: The 1907 Anti-Asian Riots in Vancouver	Winner	
2024	C. A. Tanaka	Baby Drag Queen	Finalist	
2024	Jen Sookfong Lee	Superfan: How Pop Culture Broke My Heart	Finalist	
2024	Rueben George, Michael Simpson	It Stops Here: Standing Up for Our Lands, Our Waters, and Our People	Finalist	
2024	Joni Low, Jeff O'Brien, editors, plus numerous authors	What Are Our Supports?	Finalist	
