= And a body to remember with =

and a body to remember with
- Author: Carmen Rodríguez
- Language: English, parts in Spanish
- Genre: Short stories
- Publisher: Arsenal Pulp Press
- Publication date: 2002
- Publication place: Canada
- Pages: 166
- ISBN: 978-1-55152-044-5
- OCLC: 37652564
- Dewey Decimal: 813/.54 21
- LC Class: PR9199.3.R5428 A8 1997

and a body to remember with is a book of short stories by the Chilean-Canadian writer Carmen Rodríguez. It was written and published almost simultaneously in both English and Spanish (as De Cuerpo Entero). The book was short-listed for the City of Vancouver Book Award (1997) and won the City of Santiago Book Award (1998).
