= Betsy Warland =

American feminist writer

- Born: 1946 (age 79–80); Fort Dodge, Iowa, U.S.
- Education: Luther College
- Occupations: Writer; manuscript consultant; teacher

Betsy Warland (born 1946) is a Canadian feminist writer of over a dozen books of poetry, creative nonfiction, and lyrical prose. She is best known for her collection of essays, Breathing the Page: Reading the Act of Writing (2010).

== Life ==
Warland was born in Fort Dodge, Iowa, in 1946. She studied at Luther College in Decorah, Iowa, before emigrating to Canada in 1972. She started the Toronto Women's Writing Collective (1973–1981), which hosted events, including co-hosting (with the Toronto Women's Bookstore) Writers in Dialogue, featuring Adrienne Rich, Nicole Brossard, May Sarton, Audrey Thomas, Margaret Atwood, and Marge Piercy. She initiated and co-organized (with Victoria Freeman) the Women and Words/Les Femmes et les mots conference at the University of British Columbia (UBC) in 1983.

From 1986 to 1987, Warland was the executive director of the Federation of BC Writers; additionally, she initiated Spring Rites, the annual competition for BC Writers. Warland sat on the Special Council Committee of the Arts for the Vancouver City Council. Warland has mentored writers such as Jónína Kirton. She co-founded the Creative Nonfiction Collective with Myrna Kostash in 2004 and served on its board. She served on the National Council of the Writers' Union of Canada from 2009 to 2012.

She designed the Writer's Studio program at Simon Fraser University in 2001 and served as its director until 2012, during which time she helped initiate the Thursdays Writing Collective in Vancouver's Downtown Eastside. In 2007, she founded the Vancouver Manuscript Intensive program, for which she continues to serve as a director. Warland has led multiple workshops in the United Kingdom at the Poetry School (London), the Poetry Library (London), and the Arvon Foundation (Devon). She also led workshops in Canada at Sage Hill, Booming Ground (UBC), the Metchosin International School of the Arts, Hollyhock, and Simon Fraser University, among others.

An annual book award honoring Warland, the VMI Betsy Warland Between Genres Award, was launched in 2021. Jordan Abel was the inaugural 2021 winner for his book, Nishga. In 2022, the winning book was Remnants, written by Céline Huyghebaert and translated by Aleshia Jensen. The 2023 winner was Nicholas Dawson, with translator D.M. Bradford, for the book House Within a House.

Warland's personal documents, interviews, photographs, and manuscripts have been acquired by the literary archives at Library and Archives Canada.

== Writing ==
Much of Warland's literary output has been in the form of essays, memoirs, and poetry books relating to the writing process, feminism, women's studies, and lesbian issues. Her work has appeared in both Canadian and international journals, as well as anthologies.

== Selected works ==
- Breathing the Page: Reading the Act of Writing. Second edition. Cormorant Books, 2023,
- Bloodroot: Tracing the Untelling of Motherloss. Second edition. Inanna Publications/York University, 2022
- Lost Lagoon/Lost in Thought. Caitlin Press, 2020
- Oscar of Between: A Memoir of Identity and Ideas. Caitlin Press, 2016
- Oscar's Salon, an interactive online salon of excerpts from Oscar of Between in concert. BetsyWarland.com, 2012–2017
- Breathing the Page: Reading the Act of Writing. Cormorant Books, 2010
- Only This Blue: A Long Poem with an Essay. The Mercury Press, 2005
- Bloodroot: Tracing the Untelling of Motherloss. Second Story Press, 2000
- What Holds Us Here. Buschek Books, 1998
- Two Women in a Birth (with Daphne Marlatt). Guernica Editions, 1994
- The Bat Had Blue Eyes. Women's Press, 1993
- InVersions: Writing by Dykes, Queers and Lesbians (editor). Press Gang, 1991
- Telling It: Women and Language across Cultures (co-editor with Daphne Marlatt, Lee Maracle, and Sky Lee). Press Gang, 1990
- Proper Deafinitions: Collected Theorograms. Press Gang, 1990
- serpent (w)rite: (a reader's gloss). Coach House, 1987
- Double Negative (with Daphne Marlatt). Gynergy books/Ragweed Press, 1986
- open is broken. Longspoon Press, 1984
- A Gathering Instinct. Williams-Wallace, 1981

== Awards ==
- The Vancouver Mayor's Arts Award for Literary Arts, October 2016
- Pandora's Literary Festival BC Writer Mentor Award, 2011
