= Lorimer Shenher =

Canadian writer and former police officer

Lorimer Shenher is a Canadian writer and former police officer. The former head of the Missing Persons Unit of the Vancouver Police Department, he is most noted for his 2015 non-fiction book Lonely Section of Hell: The Botched Investigation of a Serial Killer Who Almost Got Away, about the regulatory and bureaucratic failures that hampered his investigation of serial killer Robert Pickton. The book was a shortlisted finalist for the Edna Staebler Award and the City of Vancouver Book Award in 2015.

In his 2016 Literary Review of Canada review of They’re Still Missing, journalist Robert Matas wrote that the book was a scathing account of the lack of focus on the initial police investigations and Wally Oppal's $10 million inquiry, "Forsaken: The Report of the Missing Women Commission of Inquiry". Shenher wrote when Oppal was Attorney General of British Columbia, he had ruled that a provincial inquiry was unnecessary. According to Shenher, the results of the inquiry continued to be "ignored" in 2015 and the Vancouver Metro police force was still a "patchwork of municipal police forces and RCMP detachments" in 2015".

During his time with the Vancouver Police, he served as a technical advisor for the television series Da Vinci's Inquest, and received a writing credit on the Season 5 episode "For Just Bein' Indian".

His second book This One Looks Like a Boy, a personal memoir of his experience transitioning as a transgender man in 2015, was published in March 2019. In this non-fiction, Lorimer Shenher describes how he knew from the time he was a child, that he was a boy being raised as a girl. Shenher underwent surgery in his 50s and came out as transgender.
