= Kip Tiernan =

Founder of the first women's homeless shelter in the US

- Born: Mary Jane Tiernan; June 17, 1926; West Haven, Connecticut, U.S.
- Died: July 2, 2011 (aged 85); South End, Boston, Massachusetts, U.S.
- Monuments: Kip Tiernan Memorial on Dartmouth Street in Copley Square
- Education: Boston Conservatory
- Occupations: Advocate, organizer
- Years active: 1968–2011
- Known for: Founding Rosie's Place
- Notable work: Homelessness: The Politics of Accommodation
- Board member of: Poor People's United Fund
- Partner(s): Edith Nicholson, Donna Pomponio
- Honours: 2005 Nobel Peace Prize Nomination
- Website: www.rosiesplace.org/who-we-are/our-history/kip-tiernan

Mary Jane "Kip" Tiernan (June 17, 1926 – July 2, 2011) was an American social activist.

== Early life ==
Tiernan was born in West Haven, Connecticut. Her father, a World War I veteran, died when she was 6-months old and her mother died when she was 11. She was raised by her maternal grandmother. As a teenager, Tiernan learned how to fly a plane. She was a babysitter for a child named, "Kip", and liked the nickname so much she chose it as her own.

Tiernan grew up during the Great Depression. She helped her mother and grandmother provide food and clothing to unemployed men.

Her grandmother introduced her to music. Tiernan never graduated from high school but took college classes on music and learned to play jazz piano. At age 21, she moved to Boston to study jazz at The Boston Conservatory.

Tiernan struggled with alcoholism, which led to her expulsion from the conservatory. She was raped around this time. She sought help through Alcoholics Anonymous (AA) meetings, where she was initially the only woman present. The meetings allowed her to get sober and find community. Tiernan credited "street drunks", homeless people in recovery, with teaching her how to stay sober.

According to the Harvard Library catalog, in the 1950's Tiernan, "worked in a variety of public relations and advertising jobs, including copywriting at Breck's of Boston (a mail order house), editorial researcher for Houghton Mifflin in Paris, advertising manager for T.W. Rogers department store, fashion writer for Gilchrist's and Popular Merchandising, and editor of PIONEER insurance trade magazine." By the 1960's, Tiernan was leading her own PR firm. At the end of the decade, she left the firm to engage in civil rights work.

== Warwick House ==
On August 8, 1968, Tiernan organized a press conference at St. Philip's Parish in Boston's South End, to commemorate the building's closing. At the event, she connected with anti-war and civil rights activists, including Daniel Berrigan, Marcos Munos, and members of the Black Panther Party and the United Farm Workers. These relationships inspired her to commit her time fully to civil rights causes.

Tiernan joined an urban ministry at the new location of St. Philip's Parish on Warwick Street, later renamed Warwick House. The ministry practiced a "political theology of justice, not charity", a core concept Tiernan preached throughout her advocacy work. Dr. Jim O'Connell, founding physician of Boston Healthcare for the Homeless Program, credits Tiernan with instilling this value in BHCHP's practice. In his book, Stories from the Shadows, he wrote that Tiernan, “demanded that our program embrace social justice and not charity: ‘Never forget that charity is scraps from the table and justice is a seat at the table’.” Tiernan believed in and practiced mutual aid.

Tiernan utilized her PR training at Warwick House to fundraise for anti-Vietnam war efforts such as the Milwaukee 14 Defense Fund and the Camden 28 Defense Community. She and the ministry fought for mental health reform during de-institutionalization. Tiernan worked at Warwick House for 14 years. During this period, she visited a shelter run by Dorothy Day in New York City and learned from Day's Catholic activism.

== Rosie's Place ==
=== Inspirations ===
In July 1973, Tiernan read the article “Women Derelicts: To Be Old, Homeless, and Drunk,” in The Real Paper, and learned homeless women in Boston were disguising themselves as men in the hopes of getting into male-only shelters. The article solidified for Tiernan that there was inequality among poor men and women, which stuck with her. At this time, there was around a thousand homeless women in Boston. The city had only two shelters, the Salvation Army and the Pine Street Inn, and both only allowed men. Tiernan toured soup kitchens and shelters in New York, Baltimore, and Chicago and found homeless women were underserved in each place.

=== Founding ===
On April 14, 1974, at age 48, Tiernan founded Rosie's Place, America's first shelter for homeless women. The organization started in a former Rozen’s Supermarket, which Tiernan leased from the Boston Redevelopment Authority for a dollar. She fixed the place up with $250 in donations she gathered from friends in the suburbs. It expanded into an overnight shelter with ten cots in 1975. Rosie's was volunteer-led with no paid staff during its first four years. Tiernan was never a paid worker for the organization because she did not want to be. Tiernan worked directly and personally with the shelter guests, bringing them to AA meetings, buying them cigarettes, singing in their choir, and bailing them out of jail.

=== Relocation ===
In 1977, Rosie's Place moved to a five-story brownstone on Washington Street in Boston’s South End, despite opposition from the Worcester Square Area Neighborhood Association (WSANA). Tiernan bought the building with an $18,000 down payment donated by a woman doctor. That year, Rosie's bought a separate building in Dorchester which became their first permanent housing initiative for nine formerly homeless women.

=== Fire ===
On April 29, 1984, one week after its ten-year anniversary, Rosie's Place caught fire, which destroyed two floors, caused damage worth $50,000, and displaced 50 women. Mayor Raymond Flynn and Governor Michael Dukakis visited the scene the day after the fire and stated they would help the organization.

What caused the fire is unknown. The fire occurred shortly after an arson spree burned much of Boston, and during a time where real estate developers would burn down properties for insurance payouts and easy evictions. The Boston Globe wrote, "Rosie’s had enemies, and many in the neighborhood suspected foul play. There was easy access to its upper floors by the fire escapes. One neighbor learned that an adjacent property owner had increased their home insurance just before the blaze." The WSANA used the fire as a potential opportunity to push the shelter and its guests out of the neighborhood, testifying at city hearings against the shelter rebuilding. Tiernan didn't publicly blame anyone but in a personal letter that’s part of her archival material, stated, “We were, in the lexicon of the ‘hood, torched.”

Rosie's turned the Washington Street location into housing for 13 formerly homeless women.

=== Rebuilds and expansions ===
In 1986, the Rosie's Place shelter was rebuilt at 889 Harrison Ave, on the land of the original Warwick House, from private and nonprofit donations. Tiernan refused government money for the project. In 1995, the organization opened a home for women living with HIV in Dorchester. In 1998, a campaign was launched to expand the organization in order to meet the growing needs of homeless women. $3.2 million was raised for the initiative. By 2000, the Harrison Ave facility was renovated to look like a community center. Additions to the building included a new lobby, a larger dining room, showers, telephones, computers, counseling offices, laundry facilities, job boards, and a food pantry.

== The Greater Boston Food Bank ==
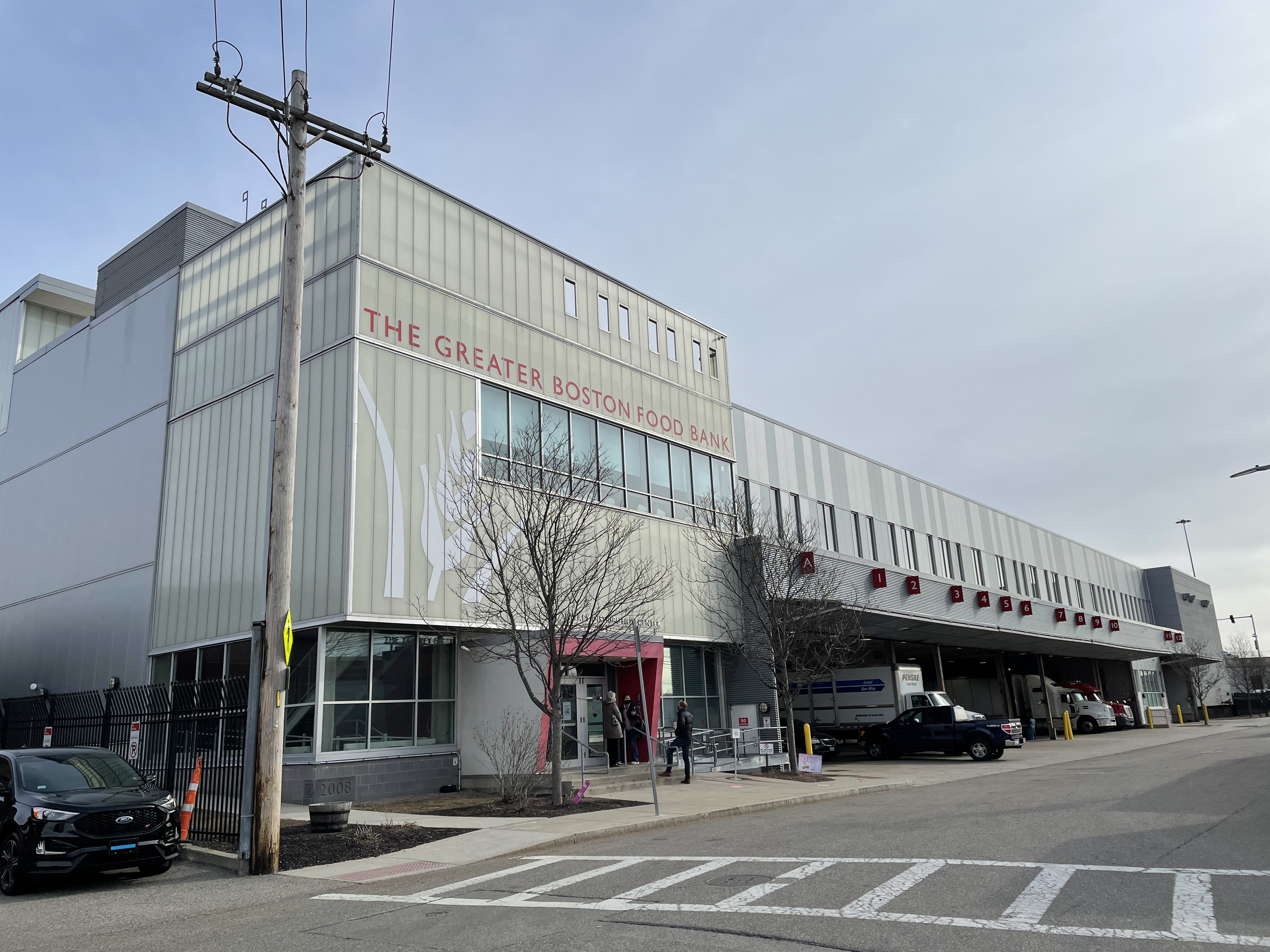
The Greater Boston Food Bank in 2021.

In 1974, Tiernan began to distribute food to people experiencing food insecurity. In that first year, she distributed 100,000 pounds of food out of the back of her station wagon. In 1979, Tiernan started the Boston Food Pantry, which she modeled after the Greater Chicago Food Depository. In 1981, the organization was legally incorporated as the Boston Food Bank, later renamed the Greater Boston Food Bank (GBFB). Juan Encarnacion, GBFB’s longest-serving employee, knew Tiernan. About her he said, “Kip was a force. Once, we were at an event and I asked her, ‘Kip, what keeps you going? What motivates you to keep doing what you do?’ She got rosy cheeks, and said ‘Anger. Anger about the waste of food – when so many other people could use it.’" The food bank now distributes six million pounds of food a month to organizations in Eastern Massachusetts serving food insecure populations.

== Advocacy ==
Tiernan and her advocacy partner, Fran Froehlich, founded, helped found, or were founding members of Boston Health Care for the Homeless Program, Community Works, Aid to Incarcerated Mothers, Finex House, Food for Free, John Leary House, My Sister’s Place, Transition House, the Greater Boston Union of the Homeless, and Boston’s Emergency Shelter Commission. Tiernan was also one of the founders of Victory House in the South End of Boston, a residential alcoholism treatment program for homeless, alcoholic men. In 1980, Tiernan and Froehlich co-founded the Poor People's United Fund.

Tiernan and Froehlich were Bunting Peace Fellows at Radcliffe College within Harvard University from 1988 to 1990. Tiernan received an honorary doctorate in human services from the University in 1989, and donated papers representing 35 years of her work to its library in 2006. Tiernan and Froelich wrote the book, Urban Meditations together, about their economic and social justice work.

In 1991, Tiernan marched with RUAH, on behalf of women living with HIV/AIDS.

In 1996, Tiernan was the recipient of Eastern Bank's Social Justice Award. In 1997, She was honored at Fenway Health's annual gala. In 2005, she was nominated for a Nobel Peace Prize.

== Personal life ==
Tiernan was friends with Lily Tomlin. In 1999, Tomlin started an annual comedy fundraiser for Rosie's Place.

Tiernan was a lesbian, "who liked to dress in men’s khakis and a cap, and wore a large cross and skate key on her leather necklace." She was in a longterm partnership with Edith Nicholson, whose children she helped raise. Tiernan owned a tiny cottage in Provincetown.

Tiernan's longtime companion, Nicholson, died in the 1990s. Tiernan married Donna Pomponio in 2004.

== Death and posthumous honors ==
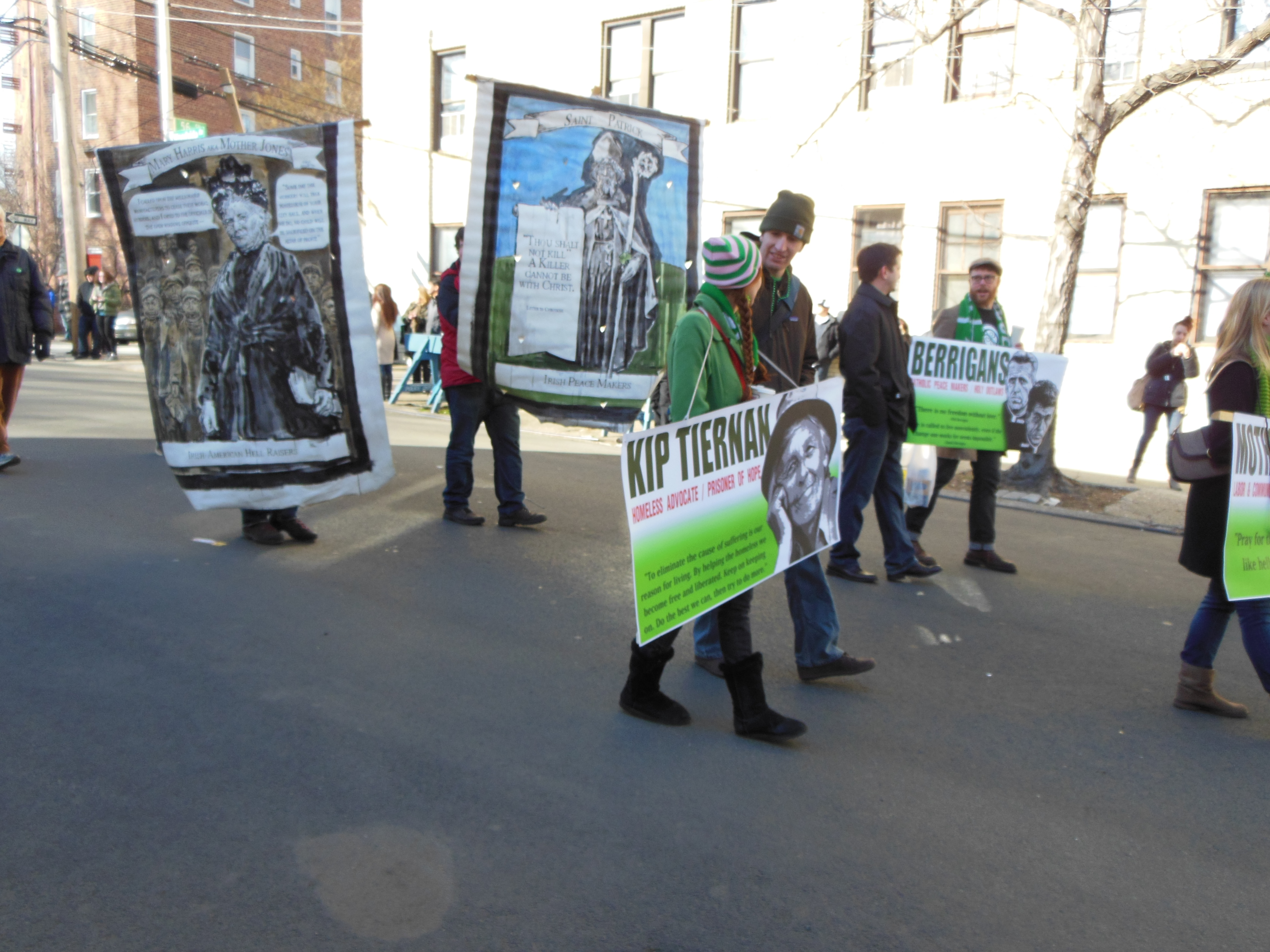
St. Pat's for All celebrates the diversity of the Irish and Irish American communities of New York, as a response to the exclusion of Irish LGBTQ communities from the 5th Avenue parade. Kiernan, who was an Irish Catholic lesbian, was honored by a parade banner in 2013.

Tiernan died on July 2, 2011, from cancer.

On September 10, 2011 a memorial service was held for Tiernan at the Old South Church in Downtown Boston. Many attended the service, including homeless women, Rosie's place volunteers, Mayor Menino, and Mel King.

In 2018, a memorial was created in her honor. The memorial is a sculpture engraved with Tiernan's words, "Cui Bono? Who sets the terms of the debate around poverty and homelessness? Who decides who gets the condo and who gets the cardboard box?” The sculpture is the fourth memorial in Boston to honor a woman. It was designed by a committee at Rosie's Place and constructed by Carla Ceruzzi and Ryan Murphy.

In 2020, Tiernan was named by USA Today as a Woman of the Century for her contributions to Massachusetts and the United States. Gail Phaneuf created a film about Tiernan, Kippy, Pray for the Dead and Fight Like Hell for the Living!, which won awards from Doctors Without Borders and LGBTQ Unbordered International Film Festival. In 2022, she debuted the production as a play in her home state of Maine.

On March 1, 2022, Candlewick Press published Sanctuary: Kip Tiernan and Rosie's Place, the Nation's First Shelter for Women, a children's book about Tiernan written by Christine McDonnell and illustrated by Victoria Tentler-Krylov. In 2023, the book won a Jane Addams Children’s Book Award.

In 2023, Mayor Wu honored Tiernan for her contributions to starting the Annual Boston Area International Women’s Day Breakfast, a 25-year tradition. Wu referred to Tiernan and the other founders as founding mothers.
