= Carleigh Baker =

Canadian writer

Carleigh Baker is a Canadian writer of Cree-Métis and Icelandic background.

== Life and works ==
Her debut short story collection Bad Endings was a shortlisted finalist for the 2017 Rogers Writers' Trust Fiction Prize, and won the City of Vancouver Book Award.

Her work has also appeared in subTerrain, Prism International, Joyland and This Magazine.

In early 2019, Baker served as a Berton House writer-in-residence. As of March 2020, Baker is a writer-in-residence for Simon Fraser University's English Department. She is working on a novel called The Matriarchs, "that examines problematic relationships with mothers."

Her 2024 short story collection Last Woman was shortlisted for the Jim Deva Prize for Writing that Provokes.
