= Cathy Stonehouse =

British-born poet and writer (born 1966)

Cathy Stonehouse (born 1966) is a British-born poet and writer who has lived in Canada since 1988.

Stonehouse grew up in Holmes Chapel, a village in the county of Cheshire in the North West of England. In 1988, having obtained a BA in English from Wadham College, Oxford, she won a Commonwealth Scholarship to study creative writing at the University of British Columbia in Vancouver, British Columbia, Canada, where she has lived ever since.

Her first volume of poetry, The Words I Know, was published by the now-defunct Press Gang Publishers in 1994. She edited Event magazine from 2001 to 2004. Since 2006, she has taught Creative Writing at Simon Fraser University. In 2008, she co-edited, with Shannon Cowan and Fiona Tinwei Lam, a creative non-fiction anthology entitled Double Lives: Writing and Motherhood. In May 2011, she published a volume of short fiction, Something About the Animal. Her second volume of poetry, Grace Shiver, was published in January 2012. Stonehouse's debut novel, "The Causes", was published by Pedlar Press in 2019.

== Bibliography ==
- The Words I Know Press Gang Publishers 1994 ISBN 0-88974-037-2
- Double Lives: Writing And Motherhood (Co-Editor) McGill-Queen's University Press 2008 ISBN 0-7735-3377-X
- Something About The Animal Biblioasis 2011 ISBN 1-897231-98-9
- Grace Shiver Inanna Poetry and Fiction Series ISBN 1-926708-23-7
- "The Causes" Pedlar Press 2019 ISBN 1-897141-95-5

== Anthologies ==
- Story That's My Girl in Eye Wuz Here: Stories by Women Writers Under 30 Douglas and McIntyre 1996 ISBN 1-55054-524-8
- Essay Acting Lessons in You Be Me Annick Press 2002 ISBN 1-55037-738-8
- Essay Truth, Dare, Kiss, Command or Promise: Fragments of a Life in Perfectly Secret Annick Press 2004 ISBN 1-55037-864-3, reprinted in What My Father Gave Me Annick Press 2010 ISBN 978-1-55451-254-6
- Essay In the Presence of Grace in Beyond the Small Circle: Dropped Threads 3 Vintage Books 2006 ISBN 0-679-31385-0
- Poems in White Ink: Poems on Mothers and Motherhood Demeter Press 2008 ISBN 1-55014-484-7
- Story A Little Winter in Best Canadian Stories 10 Oberon Press 2011 ISBN 978-0-7780-1353-2
