= Bren Simmers =

Canadian poet (born 1976)

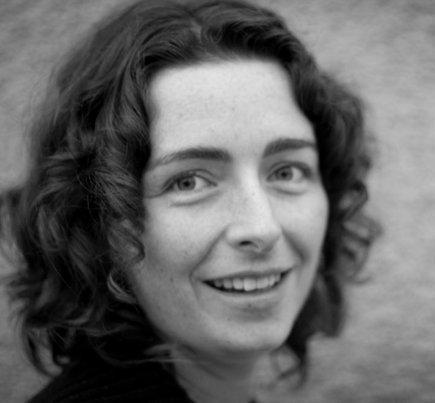
- Born: 1976 (age 49–50); Vancouver, British Columbia
- Citizenship: Canada

Bren Simmers is a Canadian poet and writer. She is the author of four collections of poetry: Night Gears (Wolsak and Wynn 2010), Hastings-Sunrise (Nightwood Editions 2015), If, When (Gaspereau Press 2021), and The Work (Gaspereau Press, 2024). She is also the author of Pivot Point (Gaspereau Press 2019), a lyrical account of a nine-day wilderness canoe trip through the Bowron Lakes canoe circuit in British Columbia.

Born in Vancouver, she studied writing at the University of Victoria and has a Master of Fine Arts in Creative Writing from the University of British Columbia. She is the winner of 2022 CBC Poetry Prize for Spell World Backwards, a collection of poems inspired by how Alzheimer's affects language. Her book Hastings-Sunrise was a finalist for the 2015 City of Vancouver Book Award. She is also the winner of an Arc Poetry Magazine Poem of the Year Award, a finalist for The Malahat Review Long Poem Prize, and was a finalist for the 2006 Bronwen Wallace Memorial Award. She lives on Prince Edward Island.

The Work was shortlisted for the Governor General's Award for English-language poetry at the 2024 Governor General's Awards.

In 2025, she won the Pat Lowther Award from the League of Canadian Poets for The Work, and was named as the recipient of the Latner Griffin Writers' Trust Poetry Prize by the Writers' Trust of Canada for her overall body of work.

== Bibliography ==
- Night Gears, Wolsak and Wynn, October 2010, ISBN 978-1-894987-49-3
- Hastings-Sunrise, Nightwood Editions, March 2015, ISBN 978-0-88971-310-9
- Pivot Point, Gaspereau Press, October 2019, ISBN 978-1-55447-200-0
- If, When, Gaspereau Press, 2021, ISBN 978-1-55447-227-7
