= Sky Lee =

Canadian writer and artist

- Born: Sharon Kwun Ying Lee; September 15, 1952 (age 74); Port Alberni, British Columbia, Canada
- Education: University of British Columbia (BA, Fine Arts); Douglas College (Diploma in Nursing)
- Occupations: Novelist, short story writer, illustrator
- Writing career
- Notable works: Disappearing Moon Cafe (1990); Bellydancer: Stories (1994)
- Notable awards: City of Vancouver Book Award

Sky Lee (born September 15, 1952, as Sharon Lee) is a Canadian artist and novelist. Lee has published both feminist fiction and non-fiction.

== Early life and education ==
Sky Lee
- Chinese: 李群英
Transcriptions

Lee was born September 15, 1952, in Port Alberni, British Columbia. Her mother, Wong Mowe Oi, was a homemaker and her father, Lee Gwei Chang, was a millworker.

Moving to Vancouver in 1967 to attend university, she received a B.A. in Fine Arts at the University of British Columbia and a Diploma in Nursing from Douglas College.

== Career ==
=== Early work and illustration ===
She became a member of the Asian Canadian Writers Workshop. Lee was first published as the illustrator of 1983's children's book, Teach Me to Fly, Skyfighter! by Paul Yee. The book is a collection of four stories exploring what it is like to grow up as a Chinese-Canadian in a community with links to both Asian-Canadian and Anglo-Canadian cultures. Reviewer Robert W. Bruinsma argued the book was "modestly illustrated."

=== Disappearing Moon Cafe and Telling It ===
Lee's first book, Disappearing Moon Cafe, published in 1990, explores the Wong family over four generations, as they operate the titled cafe. Nominated for the Ethel Wilson Fiction Prize and the Governor General's Award, the novel won the City of Vancouver Book Award despite some critics charging that the writing was over-earnest. For example, critic Gary Draper wrote, "Hardly a noun walks free of a trail of adjectives."

In the same year, Lee contributed to the collective prose, Telling It: Women and Language Across Culture. The book's writing is attributed to the "Telling It Book Collective", of which Lee was a member. The book explores issues of racism and homophobia experienced by native, lesbian and Asian Canadian women.

=== Short fiction ===
In 1994, Lee published Bellydancer: Stories, a collection of 15 short stories that explore a range of feminist themes, with allegories focusing primarily on the "bellydancer," an archetype of survival. The back cover of the book explains: "bellydancing was originally performed at the bedside of women in labor, as an erotic dance of creation."

Her short stories have also appeared in Vancouver Short Stories as well as periodicals such as West Coast Line, The Asianadian, Kinethis, and Makara.

=== Literary criticism and reissue ===
Critic John Z. Ming Chen has studied Lee's literary works exhaustively from a Daoist perspective in The Influence of Daoism on Asian-Canadian Writers (Mellen, 2008).

Critical Studies: Dr. John Z. Ming Chen's monograph, The Influence of Daoism on Asian-Canadian Writers (2008), features an entire chapter on SKY Lee's two book-length works of fiction published so far.

Disappearing Moon Café was reissued in 2017 by NeWest Press with an afterword by Chris Lee and an interview with the author conducted by Smaro Kamboureli. Chris Lee comments: "SKY Lee's novel was a major intervention in contemporary Canadian literature, a bold attempt to account for the role of Chinese migrants in settler colonialism, a feminist interrogation of diaspora, family, and kinship, as well as a gesture towards queer futures."

== Personal life ==
Lee lives on Saltspring Island, British Columbia.

Lee is a lesbian.

== Bibliography ==
=== Fiction ===
- Disappearing Moon Cafe – 1990
- Bellydancer: Stories – 1994

=== Non-fiction ===
- Telling It: Women and Language Across Cultures – 1990 (with Betsy Warland, Lee Maracle and Daphne Marlatt) Press Gang Publishers

=== Illustration ===
- Teach Me to Fly, Skyfighter!: And Other Stories (as illustrator, text by Paul Yee) – 1983
