= Lincoln Clarkes =

Canadian photographer (born 1957)

Lincoln Clarkes (born 1957) is a Canadian photographer. He has published three books, Heroines (2002), Views (2005) and Cyclists (2013) and has been the subject of two documentary films. In 2003 Clarkes was a co-winner of the City of Vancouver Book Award for Heroines.

== Early life and education ==
Clarkes was born in Toronto. After travelling around North America, he arrived in British Columbia in his late teens. He dropped out of Emily Carr University of Art and Design, where he was studying painting, to take up photography, for which he is self-taught.

== Life and work ==
Heroines is a photographic documentary of 400 addicted women of Vancouver's Downtown Eastside. The book won the 2003 City of Vancouver Book Award (in a tie with Stan Douglas). Christopher Reed wrote in The Observer that Clarkes' book offered "beauty in a beastly place." A reviewer of Heroines in Border Crossings magazine wrote, "The world would be a better place if there were more noticers: People who take the time to listen hard and watch closely. Lincoln Clarkes is a noticer." In the London journal Philosophy of Photography, Kelly Wood wrote that "the Heroines series' blurs the boundaries between commercial, documentary and fine art photography." Jesseca White wrote in sub-Terrain magazine, "In the style of Lewis Hine or Dorothy Lange, [Clarkes'] work chronicles a particular segment of society with the intention of educating, affecting change in societal perceptions and, one would hope, influencing social policy".

His third book of photography, Cyclists (2013), documents the cycling movement in Toronto with a selection of 150 men and women riding bicycles.

In 2001, Peace Arch Entertainment produced a one-hour documentary film about Clarkes' Heroines project called, Heroines: A Photographic Obsession. It was written by Susan Musgrave, directed by Stan Feingold, and aired on Bravo! and Women's Television Network. In 2011 Clarkes was featured in Bob Barrett's television documentary series Snapshot: The Art of Photography (Network Knowledge). The program includes Clarkes' accounts of many of his significant Shot in America, Portraits of Women in Texas with their Guns, and Anti-War Protesters. It was filmed while Clarkes was living on the top floor of Vancouver's historical Sylvia Hotel.

In 2016, the actor Tony Pantages portrayed Clarkes in director Rachel Talalay's film On The Farm.

== Publications ==
- Heroines: a Social Documentary. Anvil, 2002. ISBN 978-1895636451. With an essay by Ken Dietrich.
- Views. Universal/Northern Electric, 2005. ISBN 978-0978211806. A retrospective, with a 17-song original soundtrack, with songs by Herald Nix, Rae Spoon and others.
- Cyclists. Toronto: Fourfront, 2013. ISBN 978-1927443453.
- Heroines Revisited. Anvil, 2021. ISBN 9781772140712. With essays by Malora Koepke ("Heroines revisited"), Kelly Wood ("In favor of heroines"), and Paul Ugor ("Clarkes' heroines: photography and social justice activism").

== Group exhibitions ==
- An Evolutionary Look into Street Photography, included Clarkes's Heroines, Museum of Vancouver, Vancouver, October 2013 – January 2014

== Awards ==
- 2003: Co-winner, City of Vancouver Book Award, for Heroines (with Stan Douglas) from the city of Vancouver, British Columbia
- Silver, National Magazine Awards
- Gold, Western Magazine Awards
