= Jónína Kirton =

Jónína Kirton (born Portage la Prairie 1955) is a Canadian poet of Métis and Icelandic heritage.

== Life ==
Extensive autobiographical information is given in Kirton's prosimetrical memoir Standing in a River of Time. Information here comes from prose sections of that book unless otherwise stated.

=== Early life ===
Kirton was born in Portage la Prairie in 1955, and as a child felt particularly close ties to her extensive paternal family there. Her mother, Lorraine Denham, was a white Church of England Christian whose own mother, Jónína Gudrun Buason, was one of seventeen children born to Icelandic immigrant farmers in Saskatchewan—though, Kirton has said, "the only thing I knew about Icelandic culture was that we had Vínarterta at Christmas". Lorraine Denham's father Cecil Denham was, according to Kirton, "I believe Irish". Kirton's father, Ken Kirton, was a Korean War naval veteran who had experienced post-traumatic stress disorder but went on to become an air-traffic controller. He was Métis, but Kirton was brought up unaware of her Indigenous heritage as her parents sought to avoid the pervasive racism in Canada at the time. Kirton's father's work entailed frequent moves within Canada until Kirton's teens, which she largely spent in Winnipeg.

Kirton has written in detail about the abusive environment in which she grew up, and her own subsequent struggles with substance addiction and abusive relationships, as well as her growing understanding of how the childhood abuse she experienced represents intergenerational trauma relating partly to the genocide of Indigenous peoples in the lands claimed by Canada.

=== Writing career ===
As an adult, following time in Edmonton, Kirton made her home in Vancouver in 1987, though she prefers to express her place of residence in decolonising terms, such as "the unceded territory of the Musqueam, SKwxwú7mesh, and Tsleil-Waututh".

Kirton worked a variety of jobs, including with Canadian Airlines, PeerNetBC, and as an Enforcement Officer with the British Columbia Family Maintenance Program. She took a diploma business administration at Sprott Shaw College in her thirties, graduating with honours and becoming her cohort's valedictorian. She also began taking an interest in poetry, and had a son.

During Kirton's time in Vancouver, she became friends with the Salteaux elder Sharon Jinkerson-Brass, the Ojibwe writer Richard Wagamese, and Wagamese's wife Debra Powell. She attributes to them major growth in her acceptance and understanding of her Indigenous identity.

In her fifties, Kirton studied creative writing at Simon Fraser University, aspiring to write memoir. She has said that "I always say that poetry chose me as when I applied to the Simon Fraser Writer's Studio for creative non-fiction they put me in the poetry stream. They saw a poet and they were right [...] When I began it was not my intention to become a full-time author and certainly not a poet but now — I am all in!" Kirton's first book was published when she was sixty. She has particularly credited the mentorship of Betsy Warland, Joanne Arnott, and Miranda Pearson.

Kirton went on to be co-ordinator of Canada's first National Indigenous Writers Conference, in 2013, and a member of the editorial board of A Room Magazine, where she worked in particular to promote Indigenous writing. She has also been an adjunct professor at the University of British Columbia, teaching poetry.

== Works ==
- Kirton, Jónína (2015). Page as Bone - Ink as Blood. Vancouver: Talonbooks. ISBN 9780889229235.
- Kirton, Jónína (2017). An Honest Woman. Talonbooks. ISBN 9781772011449.
- Kirton, Jónína (2022). Standing in a River of Time. Vancouver: Talonbooks. ISBN 978-1-77201-379-5.

== Reception ==
Research on Jónína Kirton's work has emphasised her explorations of embodying both Indigenous and Settler heritage in the lands claimed by Canada. in 2016, Kirton received the Vancouver Mayor's Arts Award for an Emerging Artist in the Literary Arts category. According to Lögberg-Heimskringla, her first collection is "Delicate and dark, the pieces are like whispers in the night—a haunted, quiet telling of truths the mind has locked away but the body remembers. Loosely autobiographical, these are the weavings of a wagon-goddess who ventures into the double-world existence as a mixed-race woman". Her second poetry collection, An Honest Woman, was a finalist for the Dorothy Livesay Poetry Prize.
