= Chelene Knight =

Canadian writer and poet

- Born: Vancouver, British Columbia
- Occupation: Writer
- Writing career
- Period: 2000s–present
- Notable work: Dear Current Occupant
- Notable awards: 2018 City of Vancouver Book Award
- Website: cheleneknight.com

Chelene Knight is a Canadian writer and poet.

== Biography ==
Knight was born in Vancouver, British Columbia, and is of Black and South Asian heritage. A graduate of The Writer's Studio at Simon Fraser University, Knight developed an interest in writing at a young age. Her work has appeared in numerous American and Canadian publications, including The Walrus, The Globe and Mail, and The Capilano Review.

Her debut book of poetry, Braided Skin, was published in 2015 by Mother Tongue Publishing.

Her 2018 sophomore release, Dear Current Occupant (Book*hug), is a creative nonfiction memoir about growing up in Vancouver's Downtown Eastside in the 1980s and 1990s. A hybrid work of poetry, prose, and photography, the book unfolds in a series of letters addressed to all of the current occupants living in the twenty different homes that Knight inhabited as a child. It was the winner of the 2018 City of Vancouver Book Award and was long-listed for the 2019 George Ryga Award for Social Awareness in Literature. Dear Current Occupant was also named one of the best Canadian nonfiction books of 2018 by CBC Books.

In 2019, Knight was a recipient of the Writers' Trust of Canada inaugural Rising Star award. She was selected by Canadian writer David Chariandy, who noted in a press release: “Chelene Knight writes with all of the high artistry that comes from caring.”

In addition to her career as a writer, Knight is a fixture in the literary scene of Vancouver. She was the former managing editor of the literary journal, Room, as well as the programming director for Vancouver's Growing Room Festival in 2018 and 2019. In 2019, Knight founded Breathing Space Creative Literary Studio, a literary wellness hub which helps new writers, authors, and publishing professionals build sustainable, long-term careers in publishing through wellness, mindfulness, and industry transparency. She also works as an associate literary agent with Transatlantic Agency and teaches poetry part-time at the University of Toronto.

Knight's 2022 novel Junie is set in Vancouver's historically Black neighbourhood of Hogan's Alley. The novel was longlisted for the inaugural Carol Shields Prize for Fiction in 2023, and was a finalist for the 2023 ReLit Award for fiction.

== Publications ==
- Braided Skin (2015)
- Dear Current Occupant (2018)
- Junie (2022)

== See also ==
- List of Canadian writers
