= Rosie's Place =

First women's homeless shelter in the US

Rosie's Place is a sanctuary for poor and homeless women located in Boston, Massachusetts.

== History ==
It was founded in 1974 by Kip Tiernan as the first shelter specifically for homeless women in the United States. It has evolved from providing meals and shelter to creating permanent solutions through advocacy, education and affordable housing. Rosie's Place relies solely on the generous support of individuals, foundations and corporations and does not accept any city, state or federal funding.

=== Inspirations ===
In July 1973, Tiernan read the article “Women Derelicts: To Be Old, Homeless, and Drunk,” in The Real Paper, and learned homeless women in Boston were disguising themselves as men in the hopes of getting into male-only shelters. The article solidified for Tiernan that there was inequality among poor men and women, which stuck with her. At this time, there were around a thousand homeless women in Boston. The city had only two shelters, the Salvation Army and the Pine Street Inn, both of which only allowed men. Tiernan toured soup kitchens and shelters in New York, Baltimore, and Chicago and found homeless women were underserved in each place.

=== Founding ===
On April 14th 1974, at age 48, Tiernan founded Rosie's Place, America's first shelter for homeless women. The organization started in a former Rozen's Supermarket, which Tiernan leased from the Boston Redevelopment Authority for a dollar. She fixed the place up with $250 in donations she gathered from friends in the suburbs. It expanded into an overnight shelter with ten cots in 1975. Rosie's was volunteer-led with no paid staff during its first four years. Tiernan was never a paid worker for the organization because she did not want to be. Tiernan worked directly with the shelter guests.

=== Relocation ===
In 1977, Rosie's Place moved to a five-story brownstone on Washington Street in Boston's South End, despite opposition from the Worcester Square Area Neighborhood Association (WSANA). Tiernan bought the building with an $18,000 down payment donated by a woman doctor. That year, Rosie's bought a separate building in Dorchester which became their first permanent housing initiative for nine formerly homeless women.

=== Fire ===
On April 29, 1984, one week after its ten-year anniversary, Rosie's Place caught fire, which destroyed two floors, caused damage worth $50,000, and displaced 50 women. Mayor Raymond Flynn and Governor Michael Dukakis visited the scene the day after the fire and stated they would help the organization.

What caused the fire is unknown. The fire occurred shortly after an arson spree burned much of Boston, and during a time when real estate developers would burn down properties for insurance payouts and easy evictions. The Boston Globe wrote, "Rosie's had enemies, and many in the neighborhood suspected foul play. There was easy access to its upper floors by the fire escapes. One neighbor learned that an adjacent property owner had increased their home insurance just before the blaze." The WSANA used the fire as a potential opportunity to push the shelter and its guests out of the neighborhood, testifying at city hearings against the shelter rebuilding. Tiernan didn't publicly blame anyone but in a personal letter that's part of her archival material, stated, “We were, in the lexicon of the ‘hood, torched.”

Rosie's turned the Washington Street location into housing for 13 formerly homeless women.

=== Rebuilds and expansions ===
In 1986, the Rosie's Place shelter was rebuilt at 889 Harrison Ave, on the land of the original Warwick House, from private and nonprofit donations. Tiernan refused government money for the project. In 1995, the organization opened a home for women living with HIV in Dorchester. In 1998, a campaign was launched to expand the organization in order to meet the growing needs of homeless women. $3.2 million was raised for the initiative. By 2000, the Harrison Ave facility was renovated to look like a community center. Additions to the building included a new lobby, a larger dining room, showers, telephones, computers, counseling offices, laundry facilities, job boards, and a food pantry.
