= Sheila Baxter =

Canadian anti-poverty activist (1933–2022)

Sheila Baxter (September 22, 1933 – December 19, 2022) was a Canadian anti-poverty activist and author who wrote several books about poverty and mental illness in Canada.

On September 28, 2017, Baxter was awarded the governor general sovereign medal for volunteers, for co-foundeding Chez Doris, a shelter for women, that has grown significantly since opening in 1977. Due to her dedicated efforts, many marginalized and vulnerable women found support and safety.

== Biography ==
Baxter was born in London, England on September 22, 1933. She became active in the anti-poverty movement in Quebec, Canada in 1970. Baxter also co-founded Chez Doris, a drop-in centre for women living on the streets of Montreal, and has more recently been active in Vancouver, British Columbia, as a counsellor and welfare advocate at the Downtown Eastside Women's Centre. Baxter is a poet, educator and author of five books on poverty and homelessness, and is currently active with the Vancouver City-Wide Housing Coalition.

Baxter read at the Vancouver Public Library. She died on December 19, 2022, at the age of 89.

== Awards ==
- VanCity Book Prize
- Sovereign Medal for Volunteers,

== Works ==
- No Way to Live: Poor Women Speak Out (New Star Press, 1988) (Photos: Lori Gabrielson)
- Under the Viaduct: Homeless in Beautiful B.C. (New Star Press, 1991)
- A Child is Not a Toy: Voices of Children in Poverty (New Star Press, 1993)
- Still Raising Hell: Poverty, Activism and Other True Stories (Press Gang Publishers, 1997)
- Death in a Dumpster: A Passion Play for the Homeless (Lazara Press, 2006)
