= Christine Allen =

Canadian academic

Academic background
- Education: University of Ottawa (BS); McGill University (PhD)

Academic work
- Discipline: Pharmacology
- Institutions: BC Cancer Agency; University of Toronto

Christine Allen is a Canadian professor and the first associate vice-president and vice-provost for strategic initiatives at the University of Toronto. She served formerly as interim dean of the university's Leslie Dan Faculty of Pharmacy. She is co-founder of Nanovista, a company focused on imaging of tumors. She also works as the associate editor of Molecular Pharmaceutics.

== Education and career ==
Allen earned a Bachelor of Science degree in biochemistry from the University of Ottawa and a PhD in chemistry from McGill University. She completed a post doc in the Department of Advanced Therapeutics at the BC Cancer Agency.

== Career ==
Prior to joining the University of Toronto in 2002 she worked as a scientist and assistant directors of materials research at Celator Pharmaceuticals. Allen's research is focused on the field of drug delivery, in particular, micelles and gold nanoparticles for cancer therapy. She has developed several block-co-polymers, particularly those with PEG, for delivery of cancer chemotherapeutics. For cancer imaging as well as theranostic applications, the Allen lab has developed several gold nanoparticle carriers.

== Awards and recognition ==
Her platforms apply concepts in drug delivery, targeted drug delivery, as well as controlled release. She has numerous patents, over 90 publications, and has received many awards including:

- Fellow of the Canadian Academy of Health Sciences
- 2014 Gattefossé Canada/CSPS Award in Lipid-Based Drug Delivery
- 2011 CRS/Elsevier Journal of Controlled Release Jorge Heller Award for Outstanding Paper
- Innovation Award - Ontario Research and Commercialization Program, 2008
- Career Award - Canadian Institutes of Health Research (CIHR)/Rx&D, 2004-2009
- New Investigator Research Award - Association of Faculties of Pharmacy of Canada (AFPC)/AstraZeneca, 2006
- Early Career Award - Canadian Society for Pharmaceuticals Sciences (CSPS)/GlaxoSmithKline, 2006
