= Press Gang Publishers =

Press Gang Publishing
- Status: Defunct
- Founded: 1974
- Country of origin: Canada
- Headquarters location: Vancouver, British Columbia
- Publication types: Books

Press Gang Publishing was a feminist printing and publishing collective active in Vancouver, British Columbia, Canada, between the early 1970s and 2002.

== Early history ==
The organization started off as a loose counter-cultural printing collective of six women and men, but "tensions arose" between the members about the goals of the press and in 1974 it was reestablished as a women-only feminist and anti-capitalist collective. The press was incorporated in Vancouver, British Columbia, under the BC Companies Act as Press Gang Publishers Ltd. The collective operated a printshop (offset lithography, bindery) that served many progressive political, cultural, advocacy, and self-help organizations, as well as cooperative businesses in Vancouver. In 1975 Press Gang published its first title: Women Look at Psychiatry, an anthology edited by Dorothy E. Smith and Sara David.

In 1974, the organization was located at 821 East Hastings Street. The press moved in 1978 to 603 Powell Street in the Downtown Eastside neighbourhood of Vancouver. Members of the Press Gang collective trained themselves in the use of printing equipment and graphic design. They also participated in campaigns and community-based movements for social change: feminist, anti-capitalist, and anti-imperialist.

== Policies ==
Press Gang had a policy of rejecting sexist or racist material for publication. For clients, it drew largely from local feminist, radicalist, activist and community groups. The organization took financial chances, and often printed material that mainstream publishers would not. As a feminist publisher, throughout its history Press Gang published books primarily, but not exclusively, by Canadian women authors and artists. Their nonfiction titles addressed social issues including racism, labour activism, lesbian identity, lesbophobia, censorship, and women in conflict with the mental health and criminal justice systems.

== Printing/publishing split ==
By 1982, Press Gang paid six full-time salaries. The printing part of the operation helped underwrite the activities of the publishing section.

In 1989, the organization formally and amicably split into two collectives, Press Gang Printers Ltd. (a unionized collective) and Press Gang Publishers Feminist Cooperative.

== The end of Press Gang ==
In the later 1980s, facing changes in technology, the advent of the Free Trade Agreement between Canada and the United States, and increasing competition from larger corporate printshops created insurmountable financial difficulties for the printing collective, and in 1993 Press Gang Printers was forced to cease operations.

Press Gang Publishers continued activity, yet were also squeezed by structural changes to the Canadian publishing industry and an increasing harsh economic climate for Canadian book publishers in the later 1990s. In 2000, Press Gang Publishers formed an alliance with Polestar Publishers of Victoria, British Columbia. Soon after this, Polestar was bought by Raincoast Books. In 2002 Press Gang Publishers were pushed to declare bankruptcy. Most of their titles remain unavailable.

== Selected authors ==
- Joanne Arnott
- Shani Mootoo
- Sheila Baxter
- Persimmon Blackbridge
- Lizard Jones
- Chrystos
- Ivan Coyote
- Lynnette (Dueck) D'anna
- Elana Dykewomon
- Karlene Faith
- Sky Lee
- Lee Maracle
- Daphne Marlatt
- Nancy Richler
- Cathy Stonehouse
- Aren X. Tulchinsky
- Betsy Warland
- [Jana Williams]
- Rita Wong

Press Gang published works by Kiss & Tell, the Canadian lesbian art collective with values closely aligned with those of the publisher. Kiss & Tell's Press Gang publications included Two Ends of Sleep by Lizard Jones (Vancouver: Press Gang Publishers, 1997) and Still Sane by Persimmon Blackbridge and Sheila Gilhooly (Vancouver: Press Gang Publishers, 1985).
