= South Bay Incinerator =

Trash incinerator in Massachusetts, US

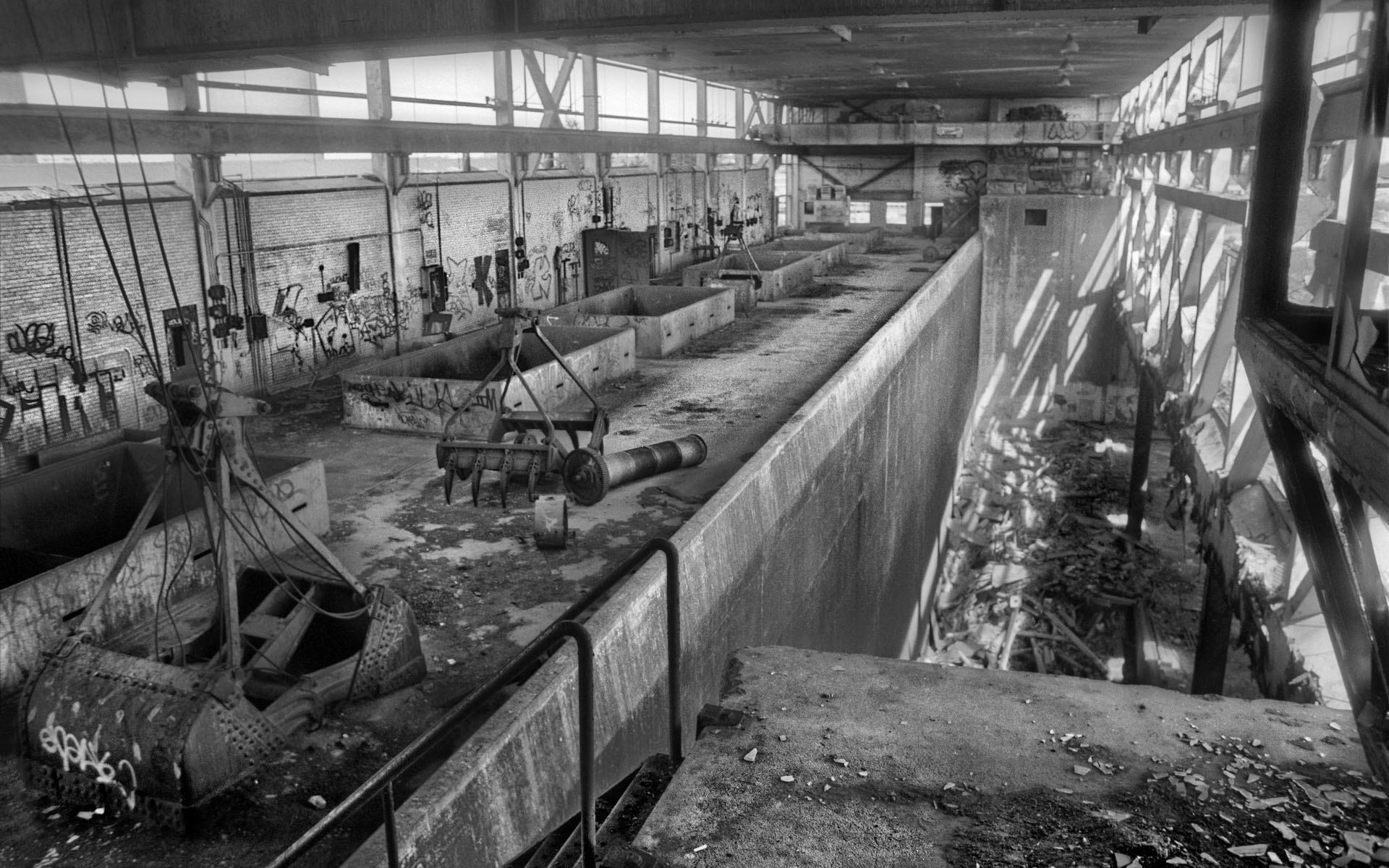
- The South Bay Incinerator interior in 1988
- Country: United States
- Location: 70 South Bay Avenue, Roxbury, Massachusetts
- Coordinates: 42°20′3.50″N 71°3′56.78″W
- Status: Inactive
- Construction began: December 1956
- Commission date: 1961
- Decommission date: 1975

Thermal power station
- Primary fuel: Organic waste

The South Bay Incinerator was a waste-to-energy plant located in Roxbury, Boston.

== History ==
The South Bay Incinerator is situated on a 5-acre (20,000 m^{2}) lot, was sold to the Boston public works in an auction in late 1950s. The building—241 feet (73 m) in width and 200 feet (61 m) in length, with three chimneys—was built between December 1956 and January 1958, and costed $6,500,000. Opened in 1960, it could destroy 600–900 tons of waste per day (225,000 pounds per hour), between six furnaces, a capability it failed to reach, due to being operated by inexperienced workers. It shrunk the weight and height of waste by 75% and 90%, respectively, which is typical of an incinerator of its type. The steam produced by it was recycled; it heated the Boston City Hospital and was turned to electricity by the Boston Edison Power Station, as well as itself creating hot water as it incinerated.

The furnaces of the South Bay Incinerator—known as "single charges", which were fueled by oil—caused 42% of its waste to combust and send smoke through its three chimneys; it failed to meet regulations by the 1970s, and at some point, was declared a Superfund by the United States Environmental Protection Agency. It closed on August 1, 1975, by order of a Suffolk County judge. The building was demolished in 1997, following advocation from locals.
