= Carmen Rodríguez =

Chilean-Canadian political and social activist (born 1948)

- Carmen Rodríguez
- Born: June 19, 1948 (age 78); Valdivia, Chile
- Education: Master of Arts in Education, Simon Fraser University Bachelor of Arts in English Language University of Chile

Carmen Rodríguez (born June 19, 1948) is a Chilean-Canadian author, poet, educator, political social activist, and a founding member of Aquelarre Magazine. Along with her husband and daughters, she fled to Canada after the Chilean Coup of 1973 and where she now resides as a political refugee. Rodríguez is known for her unique approach to writing, publishing most of her work in both Spanish and English. The translations of Rodríguez's work are done by her alone, a trend not commonly followed among other multilingual authors. Rodríguez translates her work until "[she feels] that both tips of [her] tongue and [her] two sets of ears were satisfied with the final product.'" Rodríguez's major works are and a body to remember with, a collection of short stories, and Guerra Prolongada/Protracted War, a collection of poems in both English and Spanish

Rodríguez's first publication was a short story submitted for an annual literary competition in Chile in 1972, for which she received an honorable mention. In Canada, Rodríguez has had her works published in Paula magazine, Aquelarre magazine, Capilano Review, Fireweed, Norte-Sur and Prison Journal.

== Biography ==
=== Chile: 1948–73 ===
Carmen Rodríguez was born and raised in a lower-middle-class family in Valdivia, Chile, where she lived until she was 25. Both her parents were teachers: her father taught in a school, while her mother home schooled Rodríguez and her two older brothers. Rodríguez's generation was the first in her family to attend a university. While attending the University of Chile, Rodríguez married her first husband at 18. The following year, she had her first daughter, Carmen, at 19, followed by her second, Alejandra, at 20; she raised her daughters while going to university. Later on, Rodríguez taught at the University of Chile in Santiago as a professor of English in the Faculty of Philosophy and Education.

Rodríguez describes Chile prior to the Chilean coup of 1973, as "a place of hope, a place where a peaceful road to socialism could have become a model for social justice around the world. It was not to be. Lost profits and the threat of diminished power spoke loudly and acted relentlessly". At the time of the coup, which occurred on September 11, Rodríguez was teaching at the University of Austral in the south of Chile. On that day, the President of the Chilean government was overthrown by the military. Although she did not belong to any official political parties at the time, she did express support for the socialist project, which resulted in the addition of her name to Augusto Pinochet's military blacklist of "people required to turn themselves in". This list contained the names of those who supported ideologies to which the government of Chile was opposed. Consequently, her house was raided and her two young daughters were forced against a wall with guns against their backs (Silvera 210). Some of her friends and neighbors were killed in the ensuing political turmoil. These events led to her decision to leave Chile with her family.

Rodríguez fled Chile on December 15, 1973, with her husband and two daughters, ages six and five. Rodríguez later wrote of the coup: "If justice truly existed, all of those responsible for these crimes against humanity would be tried and prosecuted. But we live in a world where economic interests are valued well above human life, a world where millions starve while a select group prospers". Her experiences of fleeing Chile, being forced into exile, and being torn between two cultures, have played a central role in Rodríguez's writing.

=== Immigration and revolutionary politics: 1974–84 ===
Carmen Rodríguez and her family first sought refuge in California, where they boarded with friends, and Rodríguez studied while working on obtaining papers to reside in Canada. The family moved to Vancouver, on August 7, 1974, and lived there for five years. Upon their arrival, Rodríguez enrolled in graduate school at the University of British Columbia in order to study literature. While in Canada, one of Rodríguez's older brothers who were also in exile died. Rodríguez describes her initial experience as an immigrant this way: "Canada: for the first few years I didn't really live here. I lived here, but I was Chilean. I lived in the function of my quick return. I lived so that I could tell people here about what had happened there. I lived making sure that my daughters would not forget Chile, would not forget their mother tongue." (Silvera 210).

While living in Canada, Rodríguez became very active in the Chilean resistance to the Pinochet regime. When in Vancouver, Rodríguez had her Chilean passport seized as a result of her outspoken views on crimes against Chilean human rights. Thus, Rodríguez was forbidden to visit countries outside Canada until she obtained her Canadian citizenship in 1979. That year, Rodríguez, along with her daughters and Bob, her Canadian partner, traveled to Argentina and Bolivia to "collaborate with the armed resistances organization, the Movement for the Revolutionary Left (MIR)", a socialist party. Rodríguez has yet to reveal the details of her underground work there.

=== Canada: 1984–present ===
Rodríguez and her family returned to Vancouver in 1984, where they currently reside. She then divorced her husband whom she married in Chile and started a relationship with a Canadian man named Bob, who is now deceased. She has since remarried and also has a son. Rodríguez did not return to Chile until 1987, more than 15 years after she left. Commenting on Chile after the coup, she said, "to this day Chileans are suffering from collective amnesia. The country is now a model of how things can change and they don't want to remember how it happened. They don't want any rocking of the boat".

After returning to Canada, Rodríguez became very active in her community. She was the chair of the Writers' Union of Canada's Union Racial Minority Writers Committee and Social Justice Taskforce, as well as being a founding member of the Aquelarre Collective, a feminist group responsible for the production of Aquelarre Magazine. The purpose of this magazine was to provide a voice to the community of exiled Chileans. In 1997, she published the book and a body to remember with in Vancouver, and in the same year published in Chile the Spanish version of the book De Cuerpo Entero. She has continued teaching as she did when she was in Chile, conducting courses at Langara College, the University College of the Fraser Valley, and, beginning in January 2009, as an adjunct professor of Spanish and writer in residence at the University of British Columbia. Recently, she worked at the Department of Education at Simon Fraser University in Vancouver, along with being an Adult Literacy Consultant, working with the First Nations people of Canada. Rodríguez has been a correspondent for Radio Canada International since 1990, discussing cultural, social, political and economic news in Canada on a show entitled "Canadá en las Américas".

== Influences ==
Rodríguez has been most influenced by her political exile from Chile and her transition into life in a foreign country. Her flight caused her to reflect on exile, living in different cultures, and speaking different languages. Her bilingualism, and the translation between two languages, has also been a source of both difficulty and inspiration for Rodríguez. As a result of her experiences and life torn between two nations, Rodríguez does not identify as solely Canadian, nor as solely Chilean (Silvera 209). Rather, she defines herself as Chilean-Canadian (Silvera 209).

=== Translation ===
"I felt that both tips of my tongue and my two sets of ears were satisfied with the final product. [. . .] this process mirrors my hyphenated existence. I live and work on a teeter-totter, moving back and forth between two cultures and languages."
— Carmen Rodríguez

Rodríguez believes that translation requires "reincarnating the soul of a piece". Often, her works are composed in Spanish, and then reworked in English, or vice versa, "involving a process of back and forth" between the two languages. This can be a slow process, but it reflects her life in both cultures. Rodríguez suggests that this translation enhances her awareness of the nuances between the languages and the "two worlds that [she] lives in". Ultimately, her aim is to create two works that "share the same soul". Her choice to publish her works bilingually was encouraged "by her desire to acknowledge the existence of Canadians in a bilingual world, forced by the hand of the dominance of English".

After experimenting with others translating her work, Rodríguez "began the fascinating process of translating them [her]self. It only took a few attempts to realize that [she] had embarked on something that could no longer be called 'translation.'" As she translates from one language to another, she tries to find the appropriate wording and context in English that would correspond to the Spanish. However, her poems and stories started to have different meanings in their respective languages. She translates her literary work more than once, until "I felt that both tips of my tongue and my two sets of ears were satisfied with the final product....this process mirrors my hyphenated existence. I live and work on a teeter-totter, moving back and forth between two cultures and languages."

== Aquelarre magazine ==
The Aquelarre magazine, subtitled "a Magazine for Latin American Women/Revista de la Mujer International", was the main project of a group of exiled Chilean feminists in Vancouver who called themselves the Aquelarre Collective. The Collective had a common view of the future with "room for life" and hoped for a future without oppression. Two members, Irene Boisier (Irene Policzer in Canada) and Eugenia Vasquez, both exiled Chileans, were inspired to create the magazine after attending the Fifth Feminist Conference of Latin America and the Caribbean. The common themes of the magazine were "women, feminism and strength" and it was meant to empower women in both Canada and South America. It was produced by volunteers who, like Rodríguez, also often had families and full-time jobs. Much of the time was spent raising funds, in addition to editing and producing content for the magazine. Twenty-one issues of the magazine were produced, with the first in July 1989. Although the numbers of contributors and volunteers varied with each issue, there were "about twelve core members and fifteen volunteers, both men and women" that contributed regularly. Aquelarre eventually gained popularity, achieving an international audience.

Rodríguez was instrumental in the magazine's foundation. She helped organize an art exhibit in Vancouver in 1987, attended by many Chilean women, one of whom stayed with Rodríguez. This woman "suggested that the exiled Chileans create a magazine to share their accomplishments with other women, in and outside of Canada". It was important to Rodríguez that the magazine be bilingual so that it would be accessible to women both in Canada and Latin America.

== Major works ==
The stories and poems of Carmen Rodríguez "...not only create a community out of traumatic memories but also in solidarity with the persecuted and in the acknowledgment of being a part of a chain of memories and presences." (Montes 75).

=== and a body to remember with ===
Rodríguez's and a body to remember with, a collection of short stories, has been described as an exploration of "how hard it can be to re-root oneself" during exile. The Spanish version of the book is entitled De cuerpo entero and was, like the English version, also published in 1997, though the works are subtly different; as Rodríguez seeks to evoke feelings in the reader that are relevant to each culture. This text explores life in exile, and how "forgetting [a tragic event] is not an option". It delves into the difficulties an immigrant or displaced person experiences, whether they affect the person directly or indirectly. Rodríguez's book, in both languages, focuses on the experiences of migration and immigration of women, making sure to assess the physical and emotional adjustments that must be made, adding another woman's perspective and experience to the book through each narrative. The book's main characters are all women, and with each story Rodríguez's use of the body, "the fullness of the body, its terrible fragmentation, or the body as a void" is used to express the experiences of the characters. Rodríguez often purposely defragments the voices and bodies of her protagonists to give a sense of urgency.

=== Guerra Prolongada/Protracted War ===
Guerra Prolongada/Protracted War is a collection of poems composed and translated by Carmen Rodríguez which serves as a historical account of the 1973 Chilean coup. Rodríguez's poetry has been praised for "her insistence on conveying real rather than merely imagined experience". The topics cover the "revolution and the murder of Chilean revolutionaries" as well as "her identity as a woman and lover". Her book has a strong feminist component, but Rodríguez also includes other social issues in her writing. Her poetry is drawn from events in her life, such as phone conversations with her dying mother, including aspects of her daily life. Consequently, her style as a poet is consistently concerned with appropriately conveying reality. Moreover, Rodríguez is aware that her audience may not be familiar with Chile. As a result of this, she procures her poems from real experience.

== Awards and recognition ==
- Municipal Literature Award, Honorable Mention, Santiago, Chile, 1998
- Mencion-Revista Paula short story competition for the story "Acuarela", Santiago, 1973
- Runner-up, Vancouver Book Award, for short story collection De Cuerpo Entero, 1998
- Finalist, 10th Annual City of Vancouver Book Awards, for ...and a body to remember with
- Was elected part of the English-language non-fiction jury for the Canadian 2003 Governor General's Literary Awards, by the Canada Council for the Arts

== List of works ==
=== Fiction ===
- Rodríguez, Carmen (2011), Retribution, Women's Press Literary, ISBN 978-0-9866388-1-7
- Rodríguez, Carmen (1997a), and a body to remember with, Vancouver: Arsenal Pulp Press, ISBN 978-1-55152-044-5
- Rodríguez, Carmen (1997b), De cuerpo entero, Santiago de Chile: Los Andes, ISBN 978-956-7014-98-9

=== Poetry ===
- Rodríguez, Carmen (1992), Guerra Prolongada/Protracted War, Toronto: Women's Press, ISBN 978-0-88961-171-9

=== Other ===
- Rodríguez, Carmen (2001), Educating for Change: Community-Based/Student-Centered Literacy Programming with First Nations Adults (Revised ed.), Victoria, BC: Centre for Curriculum, Transfer and Technology, ISBN 978-0-7726-4606-4. Original publication, 1994.
- Rodríguez, Carmen (Spring 1993), "Teaching Reading and Writing to Adults", Groundwork, 15 (1): ??
- Rodríguez, Carmen; Sawyer, Don (December 1992 – January 1993), "How Native Canadians View Literacy: A Summary of Findings", Journal of Reading, 36 (4): ??
