= Chez Doris =

Women's shelter in Montreal, Quebec, Canada

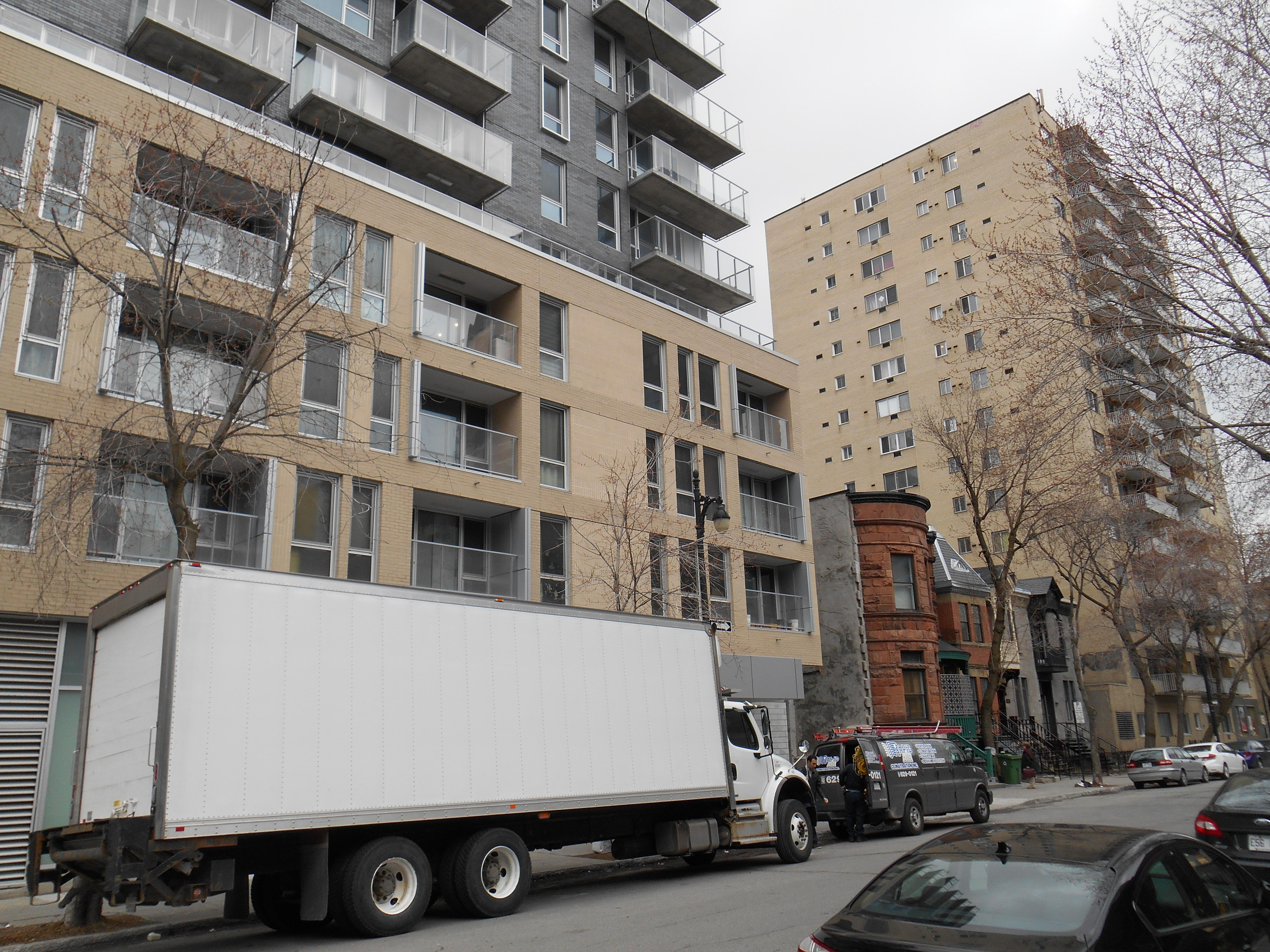
Chez Doris

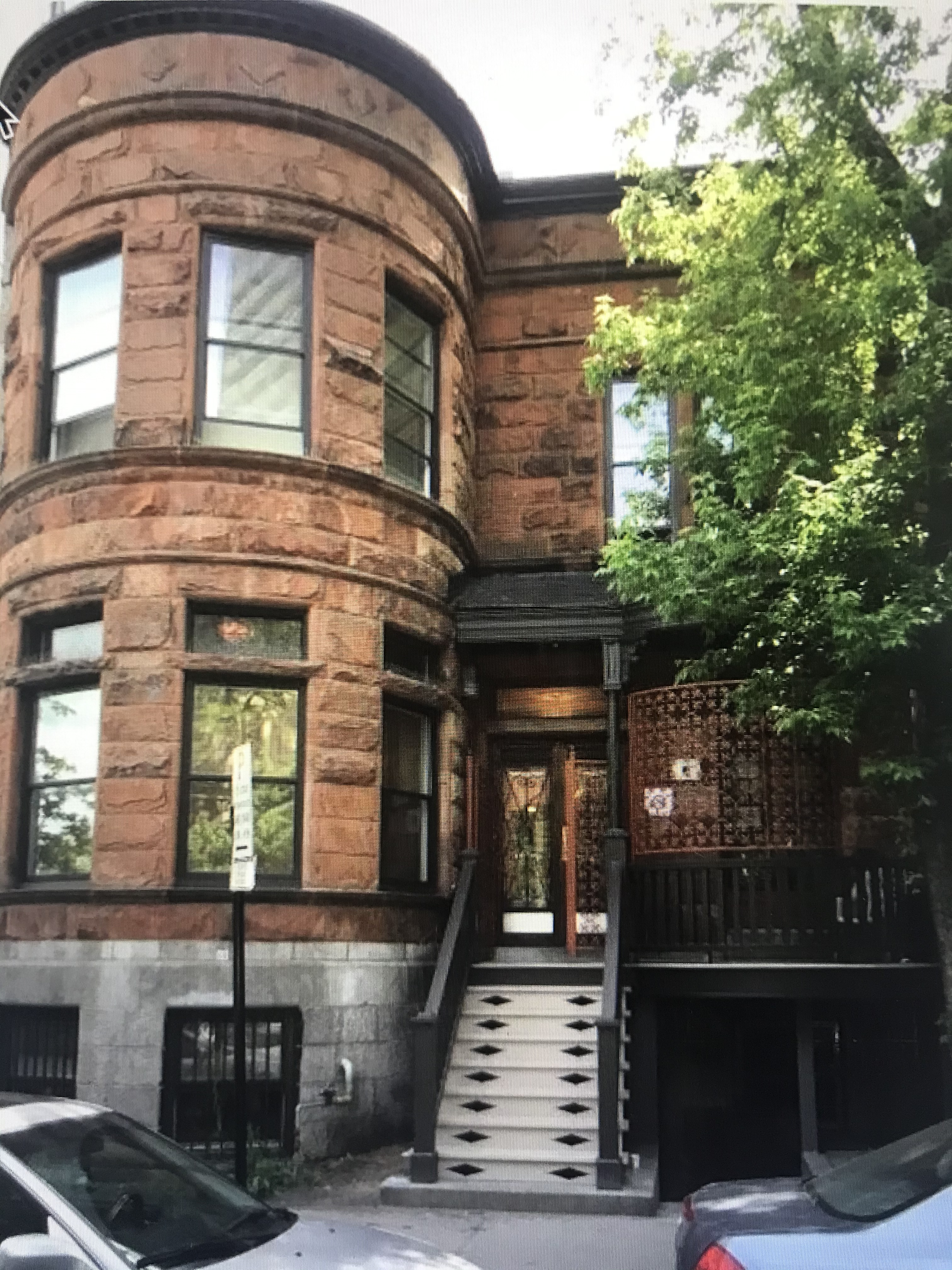
Photo taken in front of Chez Doris, 1430 Chomedy Street, 2021

Chez Doris, located in Shaughnessy Village on the western side of the Ville Marie borough of Montreal, is a charitable organization that offers a daily daytime shelter for women in need. The shelter provides meals, shelter, clothing, hygiene services, socio-recreational activities, and practical assistance to women in difficulty. The facility is multi-lingual; the languages spoken are English, French, and Inuktitut.

Chez Doris provides drop-in services, meals, financial administration and income tax filing assistance, clothing, and hygiene services, including access to washrooms, showers, and haircuts. It operates an Inuit assistance program and an Aboriginal housing program.

== History ==
The idea for Chez Doris was formed during a series of conversations between Sheila Baxter and Doris Halfkenny Seale, whom Baxter had been interviewing as part of an effort to interview female prostitutes to learn about their situations and what they needed. Seale, who was also homeless, responded by stating that it would be good to have “'a place to go without prying eyes and too many questions'”.

This later prompted Baxter to create a women's shelter for impoverished women in the Montreal area, seeing as how men in the 1970s had their own shelters, but women did not. Seale was found murdered on St. Urbain Street in Montreal's Chinatown on November 2, 1974, prior to the opening of Chez Doris. The murder remains unsolved.

Since its opening in 1977, Chez Doris had struggled to retain its daily upkeep, especially after facing large renovation and maintenance costs in 2016. However, following a $1 million donation in 2018 from retired Montreal businessman Andrew Harper, Chez Doris is not only able to sustain regular finances, but also expand its services. Chez Doris is located at 1430 Chomedey Street and offers services to upwards of 80 women per day. Following the donation, Chez Doris bought a second building across the street and announced that it will offer a space for the shelter to open an overnight shelter for women.

In 2018, Chez Doris announced that it would undertake research on the growing needs of the shelter. As a result, in 2020, the shelter expanded its facilities, including a 22-bed emergency shelter which was funded by the federal government. Another addition was a residence with 26 studio apartments for women living on the streets or who are at risk of homelessness.
