= 1982 Boston arson spree =

Arson-based protest in Boston, Massachusetts

Between 1982 and 1983, a group of eight police officers, firefighters and regular civilians set between 163 and 260 fires in the city of Boston, Massachusetts, and nine surrounding towns and cities to protest Proposition 2½, hoping to revert the budget cuts that led to hundreds of police officers and firefighters being laid off. Proposition 2½ also caused many public services such as schools, libraries and centers to suffer.

Using the information provided by Robert Groblewski, one of the arsonists, the Department of Justice was able to indict the seven other arsonists, leading to a range of prison sentences from five to 40 years imprisonment.

The wave of fires that the group caused led national media to refer to Boston as the "arson capital of the world".

== Background ==
In 1980, Proposition 2½ was approved, coming into effect in July, 1981. The proposition required that "property tax revenues not exceed 2.5 percent of a community's assessed value and that a community's property tax revenue not grow by more than 2.5 percent a year."

In 1982, more than half of the communities in Massachusetts had to reduce property taxes, resulting in a loss of approximately $490 million in local tax revenue. Approximately half of that loss was replaced by state revenue sharing. In September 1982, approximately 7,800 positions had been eliminated in schools and approximately 230 schools closed in the prior year. Multiple libraries, senior centers, and recreation centers were either closed or had to greatly reduce their hours, with communities having to reduce public school programs.

Due to the budget cuts, by 1982 the Boston Fire Department (BFD) reduced its firefighters from 2,000 to 1,400 and its companies from 77 to 55.

== Arson wave ==
In December, 1981, 40 fires were set in dumpsters in lanes and alleyways in South Boston and other neighborhoods. These fires failed to attract much attention, so the conspirators decided to start setting fire to residential and commercial buildings, including the Spero Toy Company factory and warehouse in South Boston on June 3, 1982, which caused an estimated $13,500,000 million in damages.

A wave of fires began on June 11, 1982, with firefighters responding to 30 alarms that Friday. Over the following weekend, 101 alarms were sounded over a period of 12 hours. Subsequent fires began on either late Thursday or early Friday in the weeks of June 25, July 2 and July 16 that year. The fires mostly struck vacant or abandoned buildings and the BFD had to rely on the assistance provided by 11 of the surrounding communities to cover their stations while they combatted the fires in the week of July 16. The fires that week began in a half-mile radius including Dorchester, Jamaica Plain and Roxbury.

Then fire department spokesperson, Ken Bruynell, stated that the pattern of the fires indicated that there were either one or several arsonists, saying "They're happening one on top of the other and today we spotted one fire at the height of another, common sense would dictate something's going on." Then chief of the Arson Squad, Paul McCarthy, similarly stated that the fact that the fires were occurring at both occupied and unoccupied buildings in short periods of time indicated that there was more than one perpetrator.

By at least the week of July 16, newspapers began using the name "Friday Firebugs" to identify the suspect(s), with radio reporters using this name since some point prior. At some time prior to that week, the BFD requested assistance from the ATF to maintain a "special arson watch" and to help local and state fire officials with the investigation, which they agreed to. A joint task force was set up between the BFD's Arson Squad, the Boston Police Department (BPD), the ATF and the Suffolk County district attorney's office. The special arson watch consisted of rotating patrols of ATF agents and arson investigators watching designated areas.

On July 23, WBZ-TV received a note made up of letters cut out of newspapers or magazines saying "I'm Mr. Flare, you know me as the Friday firebug. I will continue until all deactivated police and fire equipment is brought back." The note also stated "If abandoned buildings are torn down, occupied buildings will be targeted."

=== August 1982 ===
On August 6, six major fires were reported, all of them were under investigation at the time and three of them were deemed to be suspicious. The fires occurred in the areas of Dorchester, Jamaica Plain, Roxbury and South End. A request for assistance by the BFD was met by 15 surrounding communities. Federal agents also arrested an arsonist that they believed was responsible for several fires, charging him with arson in a minor apartment fire. He was later confined to a state hospital for psychiatric observation. The fires that occurred that day caused approximately $200,000 in damages.

On August 13, eight fires occurred within a two-mile radius in a span of five hours. Seven of them were deemed to be suspicious with the eighth unconfirmed, with five of them occurring within less than an hour of each other. A request for assistance by the BFD was met by 3 surrounding communities. Two of the fires were spotted by the special arson watch, which were stopped before they could "really get bad." The fires, mostly occurring in vacant buildings, caused approximately $80,000 in damages. Up until that point, the fires had occurred in Dorchester, Jamaica Plain, Mattapan, Roxbury and South End.

On August 18, nine fires occurred with eight of them being deemed suspicious. The fires occurred on a Wednesday, breaking from the usual late-Thursday early-Friday fires, with Bruynell stating "We just don't know if it's a shift in plan or if it's entirely different." The fires that occurred that day caused approximately $160,000 in damages.

On August 21, four fires occurred, all of which were deemed to be suspicious. Again, these fires broke from the norm, occurring on a Saturday. The fires that occurred that day caused approximately $100,000 in damages.

On August 26, Robert J. Stanley and John V. Ostiguy were arrested for arson, with then-Fire Commissioner George Paul stating that these were the first successes in the investigations targeting Boston's arson problems. Stanley was charged with setting a café on fire in Jamaica Plain, then attempting to set the home of the café's owner on fire approximately 90 minutes later. Ostiguy was charged for attempting to set a building on fire, after which he set a "garbage container" alight. By this point, the arson wave had caused approximately $4.5 million in damages. Of the 139 "incendiary or suspicious" fires reported since early June, 98 occurred in vacant buildings.

=== October and November 1982 ===
On October 2, a fire was set at the vacant United States Marine Corps barracks on E. Street, South Boston. During the fire, a group of firefighters attempted to cut a hole in the roof to vent the fire. The roof collapsed shortly after, leaving no time for anyone to escape from it, causing multiple firefighters to fall into the fire 40 feet below. One of those firefighters was Manny Gregorio, who had another firefighter, Raymond Martin, fall on top of him. The fire burned Gregorio's legs and back and he fractured two vertebrae, while Martin broke several of his ribs and suffered a collapsed lung and internal bleeding. The pair were rescued after 20 minutes and both were left permanently partially paralyzed, being restricted to light duties. 20 other firefighters were injured when the roof of the building collapsed.

On November 6, 1982, the Massachusetts Fire Academy was targeted and was destroyed in the fire, costing an estimated $2 million. The headquarters of the Sparks Association, an organisation of fire buffs interested in firefighting techniques and the history of fire departments was also targeted at some point.

== Groblewski arrest and indictment ==
The first major development in the case occurred on November 21, 1982, when a news crew from WBZ-TV filmed a man waving a gun in an attempt to disperse a crowd at a fire at the Gerrity Lumber Company. WBZ-TV aired the footage, and soon after, the ATF identified the man as Robert Groblewski, a former police officer with the Boston Police Department who was working as a security guard at the time. ATF agent Wayne Miller interviewed Groblewski at his home, where Miller noticed a Boston fire alarm box. Groblewski stated that he had bought it at a flea market, but a check of the identification number of the box showed that it had been stolen.

The second major development occurred when Groblewski was discovered to have modified his car with parts stolen from a vehicle in 1982. As he was a police officer at the time of the theft, he was asked to report to the police headquarters to discuss the matter. When he arrived on January 13, 1984, he was interviewed by two ATF agents. Groblewski decided to cooperate with the investigation, with one of the agents later stating that Groblewski "poured out information so fast we couldn't write it down" Groblewski would later say "We all sat around one day and agreed that if anyone got caught, we wouldn't talk...Look at me. Now I'm the rat."

=== Indictment ===
On July 25, 1984, the Department of Justice announced the indictment of seven men, one of whom they believed to be "Mr. Flare". The men were accused of conspiracy, arson of interstate facilities, arson of federal buildings, the manufacture and possession of unregistered incendiary devices and obstruction of justice linked to arson in Boston and nine other cities and towns between 1982 and 1983. Of the seven men, four were public safety officers.

Below is a list of those indicted and their charges:

- Sergeant Gregory Bemis, Boston Housing Authority Police Department – Conspiracy, arson, obstruction of justice and mailing threatening communications
- Lieutenant Wayne Sanden, Boston Housing Authority Police Department – Conspiracy, arson and obstruction of justice
- Airman 1st Class Leonard Kendall Jr., United States Air Force firefighter – Conspiracy, arson and perjury
- Ray Norton Jr., BFD firefighter – Conspiracy, perjury and aiding and abetting arson
- Joseph Gorman – Conspiracy and aiding and abetting arson
- Christopher Damon – Conspiracy to obstruct justice, obstruction of justice and aiding and abetting
- Donald Stackpole – Conspiracy, arson and obstruction of justice

Bemis, Sanden and Stackpole were ordered to be held without bail for allegedly threatening the life of a federal agent in charge of the investigation. The other conspirators failed to make bail.

The note sent by "Mr. Flare" was traced back to Bemis when the ATF unglued the letters that made up the note sent to WBZ-TV and discovered a fingerprint on the back.

The indictment alleged that the men searched for targets late at night and, once a building was chosen, they would place a plastic bag inside of a brown paper bag, pour Coleman lantern fuel inside of the plastic bag and then set the fire using a rudimentary fuse made out of a lit cigarette and matchbook. To ensure that the fires caused the most damage possible, the men removed 14 fire alarm boxes near their targets and dumped some of them into the Boston harbor.

The majority of the fires set were reported to be in an attempt to force the rehiring of firefighters and police officers that were laid off due to the budget cuts caused by Proposition 2½, however the indictment alleged that a few were caused for profit.

Groblewski was also named as a conspirator in the indictment but was not charged. At the time he was serving a state prison term and was later sentenced to a federal prison term following a guilty plea, admitting to taking part in the conspiracy and helping to set 29 fires. Although the judge could have sentenced him to 105 years in prison, he was sentenced to 12 and his whereabouts were kept secret.

=== Trials ===
At a hearing on July 26, 1984, all of the men pleaded not guilty. Damon later pleaded guilty to conspiracy to obstruct justice for being involved in a plot to urge Groblewski to flee to Canada so he couldn't implicate the others. He was sentenced on December 14, 1984, to a suspended sentence of three years imprisonment.

At Stackpole's trial, Bemis said that Stackpole was "the member of the group who was for [Proposition] 2½...In general he didn't like the Boston Police or Fire Department. As a matter of fact, he hated them. He said that they were overpaid and underworked. And his most famous statement was, he'd like to see them on their knees." When asked whether Stackpole was the only one of the group who held those beliefs, Bemis said he was. Stackpole was found guilty in federal court on November 30, 1984, on 17 of the 19 counts against him and was sentenced to 40 years in federal prison. Earlier that day, he pleaded guilty to six state counts of arson and was sentenced to a term of between 19 and 20 years in Massachusetts Correction Institute - Walpole, now known as MCI Cedar Junction.

Norton's trial was scheduled for January 14, 1985. On March 28, 1985, he was sentenced to six years in a federal prison. On December 17, 1984, Kendall pleaded guilty to perjury and was sentenced in January 1985. Bemis, Sanden and Gorman pleaded guilty to arson and conspiracy charges and were sentenced to federal imprisonment, with the four being sentenced to a range of between five and 40 years in prison.

=== Motive ===
Then Boston Fire Commissioner Leo Stapleton called into question the group's motives, stating that "We had 257 men laid off. None of them set a fire. None of them considered doing that." Stapleton also stated that many of the fires occurred after the state legislature had voted in June 1982 to pass a law known as the Tregor Bill, which allocated funds to allow those laid off to return to their jobs. Other members of the BFD concurred, stating that the conspirators frequently chased fire apparatus to fires even before Proposition 2½ came into effect.

When asked during his trial whether he liked the publicity the fires gained, Bemis said "That was our main motive, was publicity." When asked whether he enjoyed the idea of the power the fires held over the city, he said "Yes, we did."

However, when asked at the trial of Stackpole whether he believed they weren't having any impact, Bemis stated "No, that's not correct. We were, I believe, the sole responsibility that the Tregor Bill did pass." When asked whether he was proud of himself, he stated that he was not.

== Aftermath ==
Between 163 and 260 fires were set by the group, causing an estimated total of between $20–50 million in damages, the most costly of which was a fire at the Spero Toy Company in South Boston on June 3, 1982, which caused an estimated $13.5 million in damages. The fires injured between 270 and 282 people, 31 of which occurred at the Spero Toy Company fire and at least 65 of which were firefighters, some of which were left with permanent disabilities. At the time, US Attorney William Weld called the arson spree "the largest arson case in history, both state and federally; in terms of the number of fires."

Stackpole was released from prison at an unknown time and died in 2012. According to Miller, Bemis was never angry for being arrested, stating that he "used to send us Christmas cards."

Miller later wrote a book called Burn Boston Burn about his experiences working the case, on which he received help from Bemis. Bemis apparently wrote a 166-page treatise written on a typewriter, which Miller "drew upon heavily" when writing the book. Bemis also provided the photograph on the front cover of the book to Miller, which was taken at the American Cellophane and Plastic Films Corporation fire in Jamaica Plain in June, 1982.
