= Mon Keang School =

Chinese school in Vancouver, British Columbia

- 文彊學校
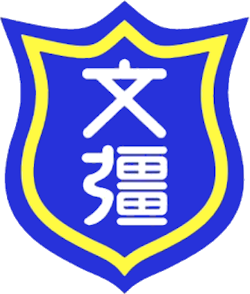

Location
- 123A East Pender Street; Vancouver, British Columbia, V6A 1T6; Canada; 49°16′50.16″N 123°6′5.04″W

Information
- School type: Chinese school
- Founded: 1925
- Language: Cantonese

Mon Keang School
- Traditional Chinese: 文彊學校
- Simplified Chinese: 文强学校
- Jyutping: man^{4} koeng^{4} hok^{6} haau^{6}
Transcriptions
Standard Mandarin
- Hanyu Pinyin: Wén Qiáng Xuéxiào
- Wade–Giles: Wen^{2} Chiang^{2} Hsüeh^{2}-hsiao^{4}
Yue: Cantonese
- Jyutping: man^{4} koeng^{4} hok^{6} haau^{6}
other Yue
- Taishanese: mun^{3} kiang^{3} hok^{5} hau^{5}

Mon Keang School (Chinese: 文彊學校) is a Chinese school located inside the Wongs' Benevolent Association Building at 123A East Pender Street, in the Chinatown of Vancouver, British Columbia, Canada. Classes have historically been taught in Cantonese, the prestige variety of Yue Chinese.

== History ==
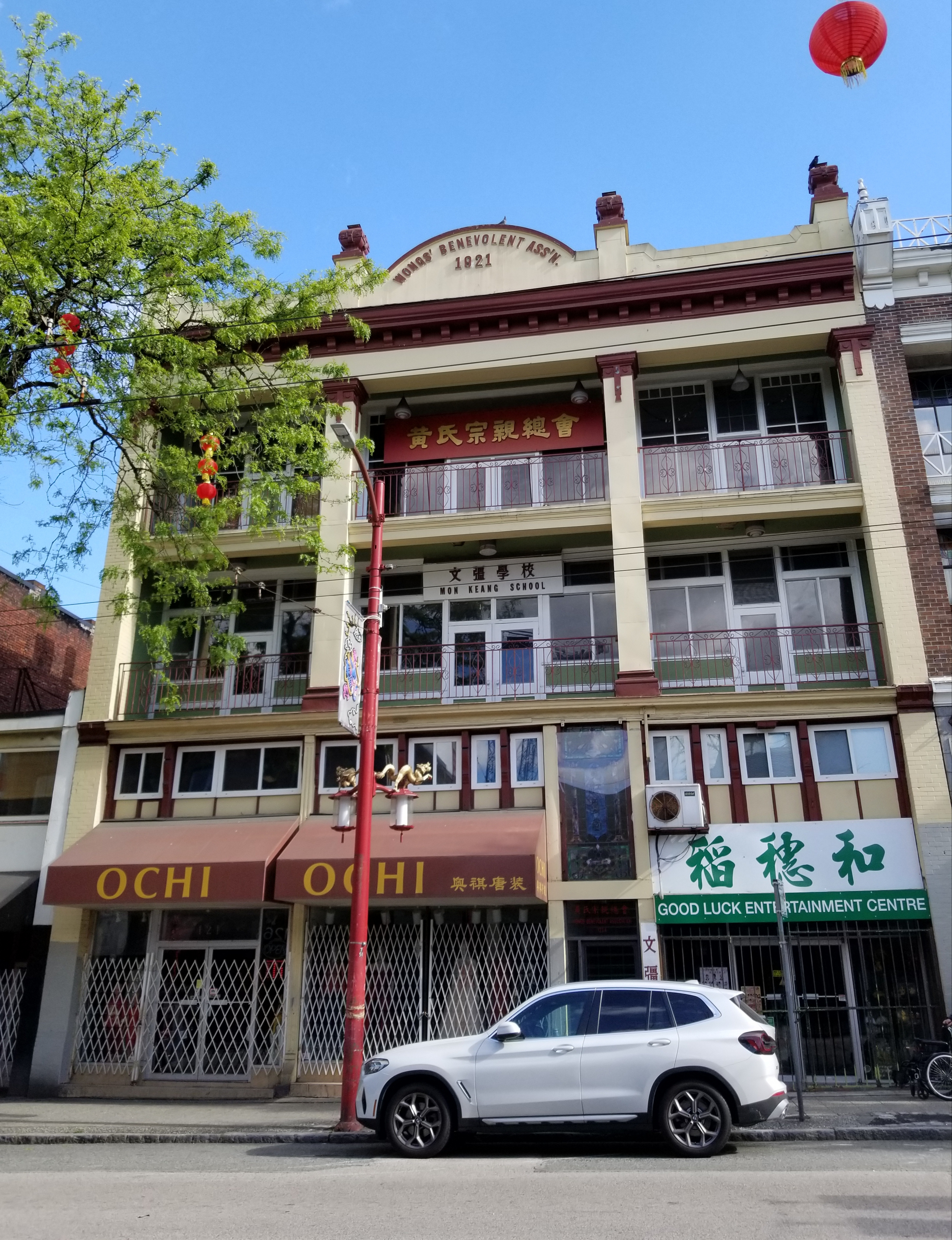
The exterior of the Wongs' Benevolent Association Building at 121 East Pender Street, where the Mon Keang School is housed on the third floor.

Mon Keang School was established on the third floor of the Wongs' Benevolent Association Building in 1925. Its objective was to teach Chinese cultural customs and the Cantonese language to Canadian-born children of Chinese descent.

By 1937, Mon Keang was one of ten Chinese schools in Vancouver, with classes at these schools funded primarily by Chinese clan associations, the Chinese Freemasons, and churches. Like other Chinese schools of the time, Mon Keang only offered elementary-level language classes until after World War II, when it became the first Chinese school to provide language classes at the secondary level. Instructors at Mon Keang were mainly Chinese immigrants who were exempt from the Chinese Immigration Act, 1923 (now commonly known as the Chinese Exclusion Act) in effect at the time.

Wong Kown Fow (黃孔阜), a teacher and principal of Mon Keang from 1936 to 1969, noted that the school officially used Cantonese to teach its students, but many of its instructors also used a mixture of both Cantonese and Taishanese.

In 2011, the school stopped offering classes "due to declining enrolment and changing demographics that favour learning Mandarin over Cantonese“.

In 2016, the Youth Collaborative for Chinatown (青心在唐人街), a grassroots youth group based in Vancouver's Chinatown, began organizing Saturday School, a series of place-based, Cantonese-language classes through classes inside the former Mon Keang classrooms and field studies and trips to various other locations in Chinatown.

In 2024, the school was one of 12 nationally recognized sites nominated for "The Next Great Save" contest by the National Trust For Canada.

Archival materials related to the school can be accessed online at the City of Vancouver Archives and University of British Columbia School of Information's Arca Digital Repository. Many historic photos of school activities were taken by noted photographer Yucho Chow.

== Building history ==
The school is housed in the Wongs' Benevolent Association Building, located on 123A East Pender Street, on its third floor. The building was originally constructed in 1910, but it underwent several renovations over the years, including some designed by Chinese-Canadian architect W.H. Chow, G. A. Southall, and later by J.A. Radford in 1921.

Mon Keang School was designated a "national historic site" in 2023, under Parks Canada's National Program of Historical Commemoration. Steven Guilbeault, the minister responsible for Parks Canada, made a press release on the designation on May 31, 2024.

The building is noted for its period stained glass window, original stairway, mezzanine balconies, and third floor ancestral hall which demonstrate key features of Chinatown society building architecture.

== Notable people ==
- Paul Yee – student
- Justice Randall Wong – student and trustee
- Wong Foon Sien – trustee and president
- Hin Lew – student, first Chinese Canadian physicist
