= Bessie Lee =

Chinese Canadian community organizer

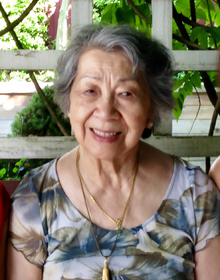
- Photo of Bessie Lee
- Born: Bessie Lum; August 26, 1924
- Died: December 22, 2016 (aged 92); Vancouver, British Columbia
- Organization(s): Strathcona Property Owners and Tenants Association (SPOTA)
- Known for: Community organizing and civic activism
- Spouse: Henry James Lee
- Children: 8
- Awards: BC Community Achievement Award, 2014

Bessie Lee (née Lum; August 26, 1924 – December 22, 2016) was a Chinese Canadian community organizer and civic activist in Vancouver's Strathcona and Chinatown neighbourhoods. She was a co-founder and long-time President of the Strathcona Property Owners and Tenants Association (SPOTA), which was instrumental in mobilizing several neighborhoods to work together to stop a freeway in the late 1960s that would have run through the heart of many of Vancouver's inner-city neighborhoods. Lee was also a founding member of the Britannia Community Centre and a board member of the Strathcona Community Centre. She won the BC Community Achievement Award in 2014.

== Early life and education ==
Lee grew up in Vancouver's Chinatown in the 1930s. She attended Lord Strathcona Elementary School and Vancouver Normal School. Her family operated a fish and general store that served the Chinese bachelors living in Chinatown. From her mother, an herbalist, Lee learned how to prepare herbal tonics and medicinal preparations made from roots, leaves, bark and wild animal parts that the older men would bring in from the bush. Because her father died young, Lee quit school before graduation to help her widowed mother run the business. When she was 20 years of age, Bessie eloped with Henry James Lee. They had eight children.

== Strathcona Property Owners and Tenants Association (SPOTA) ==
In 1968, out of necessity, Bessie Lee embarked on a lengthy career as a community organizer and civic activist. With her home threatened by expropriation and the bulldozer under Phase 3 of the City of Vancouver's Urban Renewal Project and with nowhere else to go, Lee decided to get involved. She was a co-founder of the SPOTA with fellow Vancouver civic activist Mary Lee Chan in November/December 1968. SPOTA was a strong unified community voice against the freeway that was planned to through Strathcona as part of an "urban renewal" program. At the beginning of SPOTA, Lee initially served as the English Secretary eventually becoming its long-time President. Lee and SPOTA helped to halt the program as it would have destroyed the older neighborhoods of Vancouver.

In 1968, Robert Andras, the federal minister in charge of housing for Pierre Trudeau's new Liberal government met with SPOTA. Andras' visit resulted in the halting of the City of Vancouver's existing redevelopment plan and an investment of $5 million in a pilot project. Itt engaged SPOTA in a planning process that involved each level of government and saw existing buildings, streets, and sidewalks in Strathcona rehabilitated and new parks and a community centre built. The pilot became a national program for preserving older, inner city neighborhoods. SPOTA received a Governor General's award for this project.

== Advocacy work ==
Among her many achievements, Lee spearheaded the campaign to build affordable co-operative, infill housing for families and seniors on vacant lots. She worked to improve health and social services delivery to Strathcona families and elders. She helped to develop and manage integrated community recreation centers and parks in Strathcona and Grandview Woodland.

Lee was a founding member of the Britannia Community Centre and the Strathcona Community Centre's elected Boards. The Strathcona Linear Park was a direct result of her determination that the City of Vancouver replace the original MacLean Park that was superseded by public housing towers. As a member of the Strathcona Rehabilitation Project steering committee she negotiated funding to build the Strathcona Linear Park and the Strathcona Community Centre.

Working alongside others, Lee helped to pioneer innovative, culturally hybrid forms of community organizing such as ribbon cutting ceremonies, open houses and teas, walking tours and multi-venue Chinese banquets during municipal, provincial and federal elections to raise funds and to bring local issues to the forefront.

In an interview in the book Opening Doors, Lee said: "We have to remind the city that when they decide to change things in a community they must always consider the social planning of that community and the concerns of the people who live in it."

== Awards ==
Lee won the BC Community Achievement Award in 2014.
