= Bison (metal band) =

Canadian sludge metal band

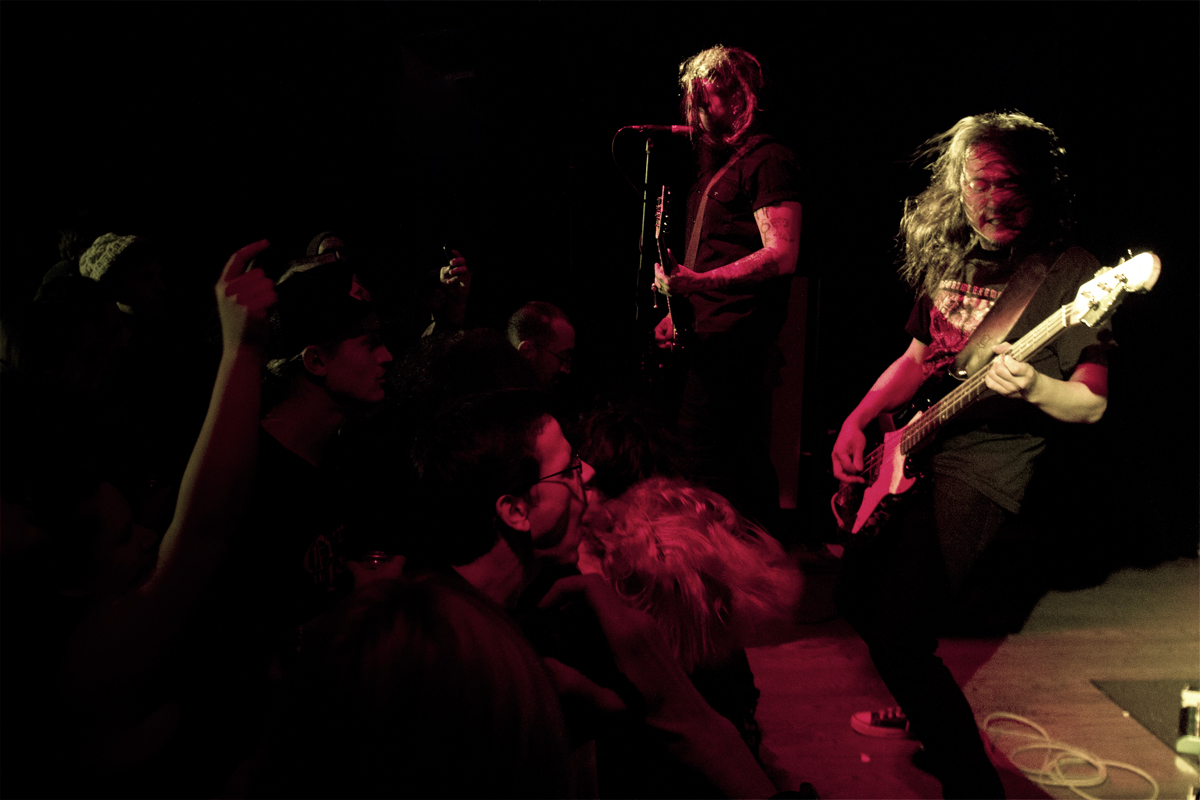
- Bison B.C performing at Fortune Sound Club, Vancouver, 2011

Background information
- Also known as: Bison B.C.
- Origin: Vancouver, British Columbia, Canada
- Genres: Sludge metal, stoner metal
- Years active: 2006–present
- Members: James Farwell (or "Gnarwell"); Dan And; Shane Clark; Matt Wood
- Past members: Masa Anzai; Brad Mackinnon
- Website: Bison on Facebook

Bison (formerly Bison B.C.) is a Canadian sludge metal band from Vancouver, formed in 2006 by vocalist and guitarist James Farwell. Bison has released four studio albums and two EPs. They have toured with 3 Inches of Blood, Genghis Tron, Baroness, The Ocean Collective, Priestess, Coliseum, Weedeater and High on Fire.

The band was formerly signed to California-based Metal Blade Records. They were released from their contract with Metal Blade in February 2013, and shortly thereafter, reverted to their original name Bison.

== History ==
=== Earthbound and Quiet Earth (2007–2009) ===
On November 5, 2007, Bison released their first EP/LP titled Earthbound on Forest Records. It contained 6 tracks with a runtime of 30:51.

On September 30, 2008, Bison B.C. released their first full-length album for Metal Blade Records entitled Quiet Earth. Comprising 8 tracks with a runtime of 43 minutes. 'About.com' gave the album 3.5/5 saying that "There's a definite retro feel to some of the songs, but others are very contemporary. There are a few lulls and some songs that could be a bit shorter, but Quiet Earth is a surprisingly good CD from a relatively unknown Canadian band that shouldn't be unknown for much longer". The website 'ReviewBusters.net' gave the album a 9.5/10 stating that, "In Bison b.c.'s case you get a terrific album. Quiet Earth makes everything Mastodon put out look like child's play."

Jamie Hooper (scream vocalist from Canadian power metal band 3 Inches Of Blood) is a featured vocalist on the track "Slow Hand of Death".

On October 27, 2008, RollingStone.com featured Bison B.C. as one of 10 Buzz-Worthy Breakouts as part of a feature called CMJ's Hottest Bands. Chris Steffen described them as "Heavy man. Real heavy. Jean-jacket heavy."

=== Dark Ages and Lovelessness (2010–2012) ===
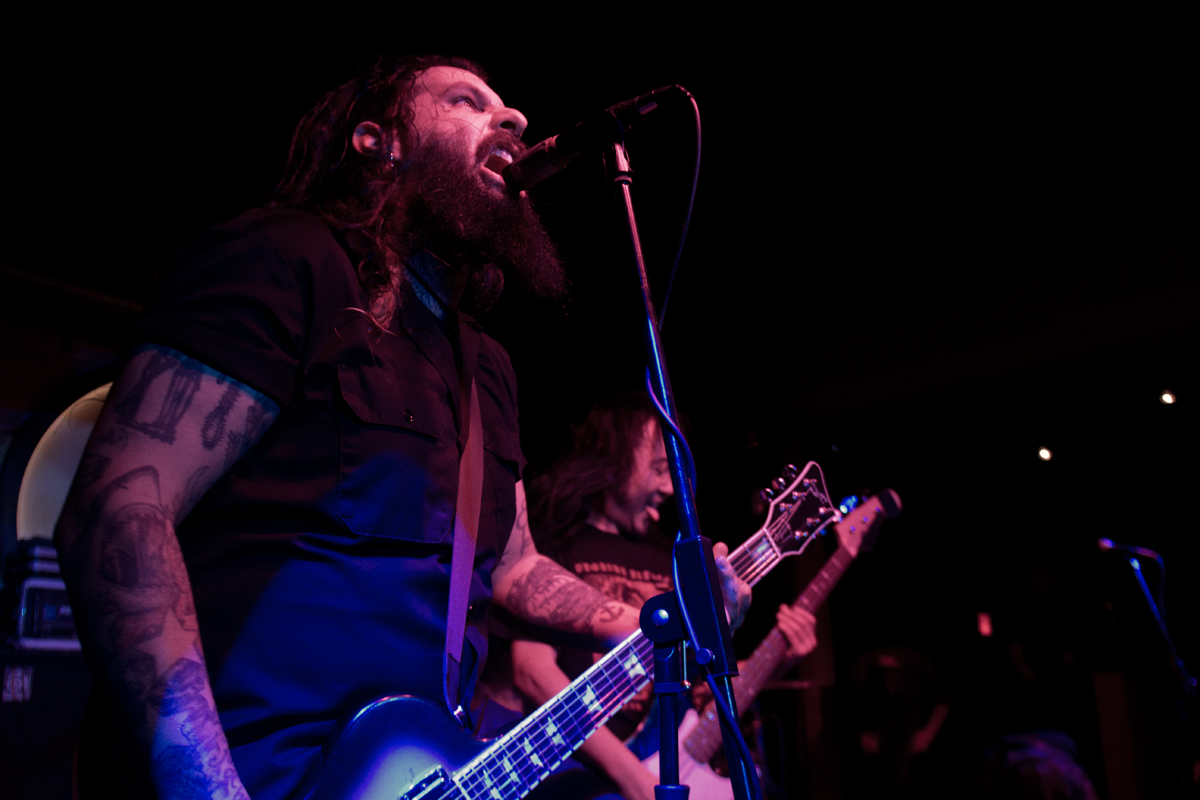
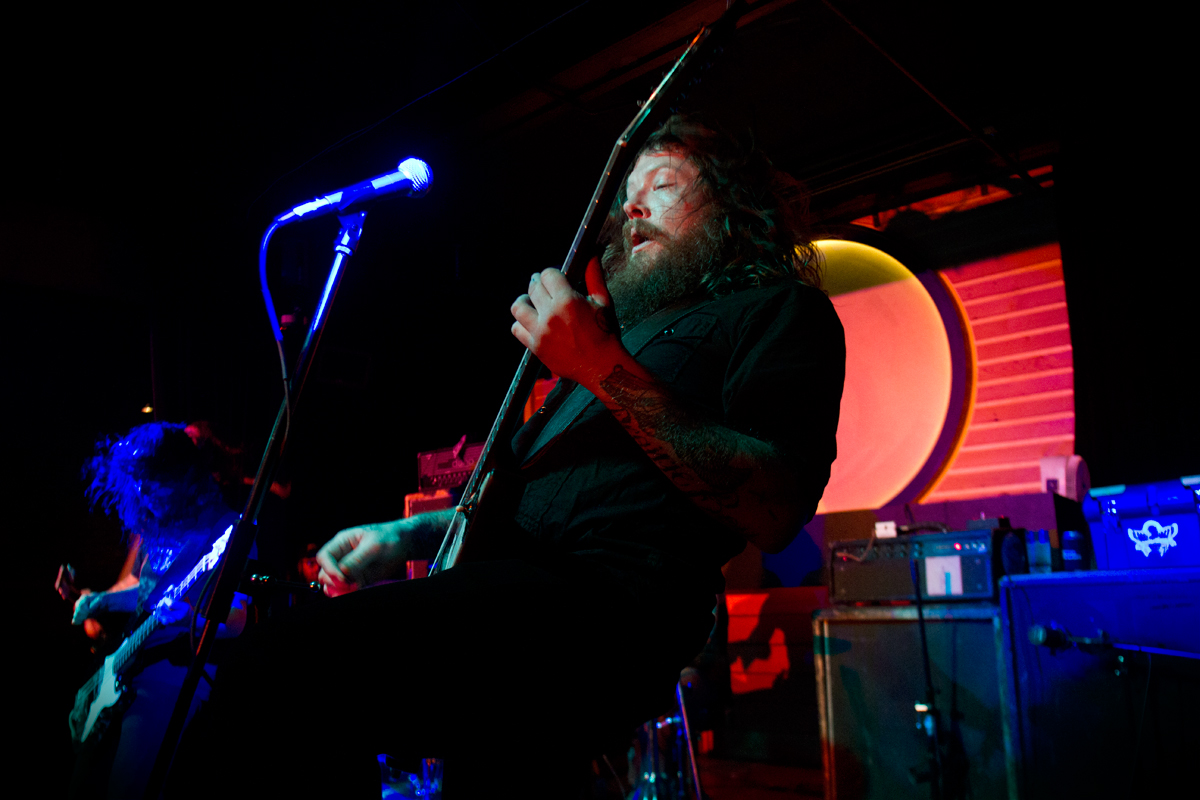
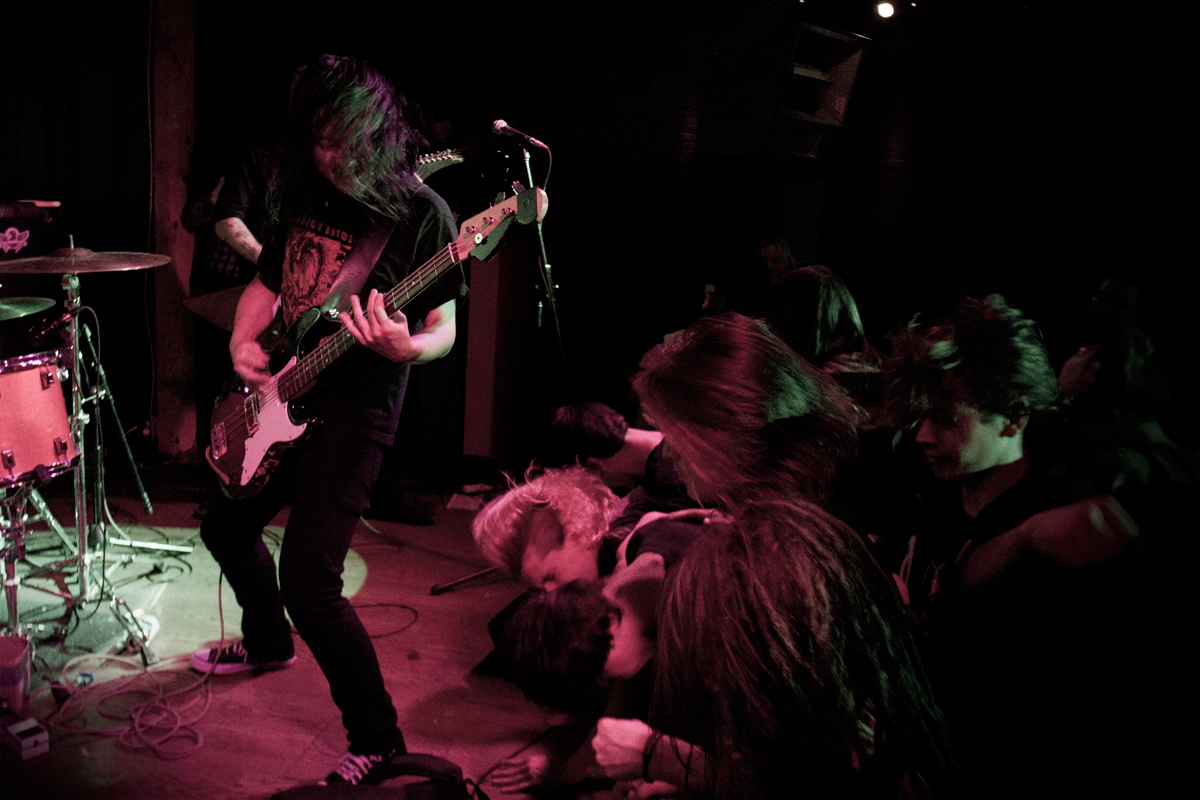
Bison B.C performing at Fortune Sound Club, Vancouver, 2011

On April 13, 2010, Bison B.C. released their second full-length album, containing seven tracks, released by Metal Blade Records. Heavy metal music critic Philip Whitehouse of OneMetal.com stated "if you're thirsty for unpretentious, balls-out, heavy-as-hell metal, this album is set to be the soundtrack to all your future raging keggers".

Dark Ages was named the No. 6 Metal Album of 2010 by Exclaim! magazine.

On October 22, 2012, Bison B.C. released their third full-length LP on Metal Blade Records titled Lovelessness. Containing 6 tracks with a runtime of 44:24. It was recorded by Sanford Parker at Soma and Electrical Audio Studios in Chicago, Illinois. This album featured the replacement of drummer Brad Mackinnon with new member from 2011 Matt Wood. WeLoveMetal.com described the album: "Lovelessness is a prime example of keeping your metal simple and straight forward. Instead of doing a lot of different stuff poorly, Bison makes their in your face metal balls to the wall." AxisofMetal.com's Alex Gallant gives the album a 9/10 stating, "The band lays its outlook bare on this record, making you feel it through the construction of their songs and a wall of sound that pushes forward relentlessly like a tidal wave."

=== Name change and subsequent events (2013–present) ===
Not long after severing ties with Metal Blade Records in early 2013, the band had changed their name back from Bison B.C. to simply Bison. Their first release under this name, the limited edition vinyl EP One Thousand Needles, was released in 2014, and Bison toured to support it.

Bison released their first album in five years, and first one since the name change, You Are Not The Ocean You Are the Patient, in 2017 on Pelagic Records.

Bison is currently writing a new album.

== Meaning of the band name ==
There has been some confusion over what the band's official name actually is. They signed to Metal Blade Records under the name Bison B.C. The name change was done to avoid any confusion with other bands of the same or a similar name.

In an interview with MindYourMind.ca, Bison B.C. guitarist Dan And gave their reason behind adding "B.C." to the name stating:

The "BC" doesn't actually stand for any one particular thing. In fact we chose it because it could be interpreted in a few different ways. After a couple years as a band we discovered that there were a few other bands with the same name but of completely different musical styles. After some friends of ours experienced a horror show of legal trouble simply because of a name dispute we decided to cover our asses just in case.

The band had officially changed their name back to Bison by the time of the release of their 2014 EP One Thousand Needles.

== Band members ==
Current

- James Farwell – guitar, vocals (2006–present)
- Dan And – guitar, vocals (2006–present)
- Matt Wood – drums (2011–present)
- Shane Clark – bass (2015–present)

Former

- Brad Mackinnon – drums (2006–2011)
- Masa Anzai – bass (2006–2015)

== Discography ==
=== Studio albums ===
- Quiet Earth (2008, Metal Blade Records)
- Dark Ages (2010, Metal Blade Records)
- Lovelessness (2012, Metal Blade Records)
- You Are Not the Ocean You Are the Patient (2017, Pelagic Records)

=== EPs ===
- Earthbound (2007)
- One Thousand Needles (2014)
