= Mary Chan =

Mary Chan may refer to:

- Mary Jean Chan (born 1990), Chinese-British poet, lecturer and editor
- Mary Lee Chan (1915–2002), civic activist in Vancouver, British Columbia, Canada
