= Sunrise Soya Foods =

- Founded: 1956; 69 years ago in Vancouver, Canada
- Founder: Leslie and Susan Joe
- Products: Tofu, soy products
- Owner: Peter Joe
- Website: sunrise-soya.com

Sunrise Soya Foods is a Canadian company that manufactures tofu and soy products.

== History ==
=== Founding and early years ===
In 1956, the company was founded by Leslie Joe when they started to produce tofu in the back of their market, Sunrise Market in Chinatown, Vancouver. They quickly gained traction and grew a Chinese community among the company. Due to the demand of tofu rising from the 1960s and onward for its nutritional value, their company continued to thrive.

=== Expansion ===
In 1983, their operations re-located with new equipment, helping them produce pasteurized tofu, further popularizing their company throughout Western Canada. From the 1990s and forward, they began to expand their market to include soy beverages, tofu deserts, and other products. They were among the first companies to distribute tofu created with non-GMO soybeans and released their first products under the brand name of “Soygenic”. In 2002, they opened up a second facility in Toronto. On September 24, 2019, they opened a third facility in Delta, British Columbia, which would be their biggest facility to date, being around 85,000 square feet. Today, their products can be found in over 1,500 stores across Canada and have employed over 300 employees.
