= Chinatown, Vancouver =

Neighbourhood in Vancouver, British Columbia

Chinatown
- Neighbourhood
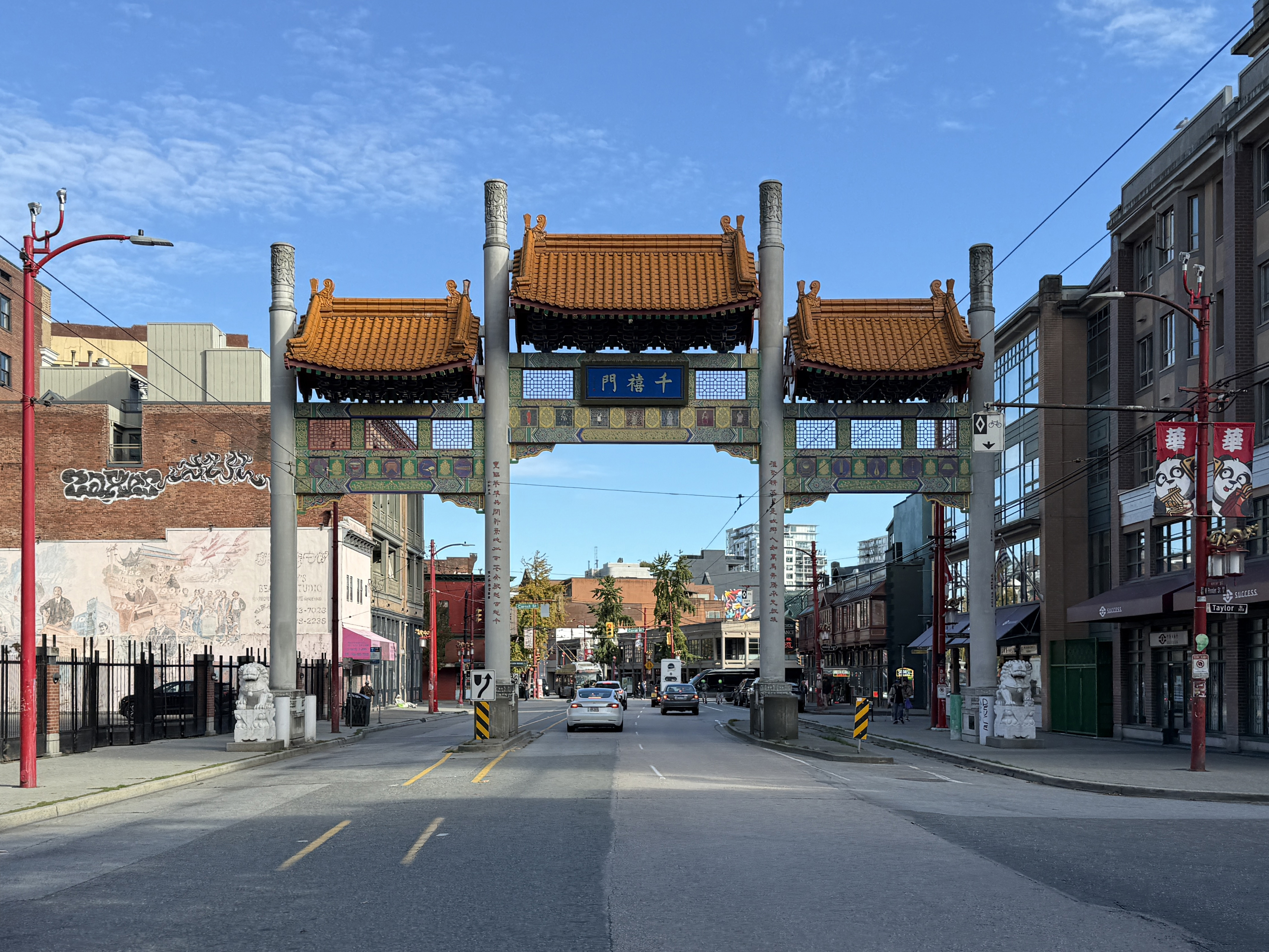
- Millennium Gate on Pender Street in Chinatown in 2025
- Interactive map of Chinatown
- Coordinates: 49°16′48″N 123°5′58″W
- Country: Canada
- Province: British Columbia
- City: Vancouver
- Time zone: UTC−08:00 (Pacific)
  - Summer (DST): UTC−07:00 (PDT)
- Area codes: 604, 778, 236

National Historic Site of Canada
- Official name: Vancouver's Chinatown National Historic Site of Canada
- Designated: July 19, 2011

Chinatown, Vancouver
- Traditional Chinese: 溫哥華華埠
- Simplified Chinese: 温哥华华埠
Transcriptions
Standard Mandarin
- Hanyu Pinyin: Wēngēhuá Huá-bù
- Wade–Giles: Wen^{1}-ko^{1}-hua^{2} Hua^{2}-pu^{4}
- IPA: [wə́nkɤ́xwǎ xwǎpû]
Hakka
- Romanization: Vunˊ goˊ faˇ faˇ pu
Yue: Cantonese
- Jyutping: Wan^{1}go^{1}waa^{4} Waa^{4}fau^{6}

Alternative Chinese name
- Traditional Chinese: 溫哥華唐人街
- Simplified Chinese: 温哥华唐人街
Transcriptions
Standard Mandarin
- Hanyu Pinyin: Wēngēhuá Tángrénjiē
- Wade–Giles: Wen^{1}-ko^{1}-hua^{2} T'ang^{2}-jen^{2}-chieh^{1}
- IPA: [wə́nkɤ́xwǎ tʰǎŋɻə̌ntɕjé]
Hakka
- Romanization: Vunˊ goˊ faˇ tongˇ nginˇ gieˊ
Yue: Cantonese
- Jyutping: Wan^{1}go^{1}waa^{4} Tong^{4}jan^{4}gaai^{1}

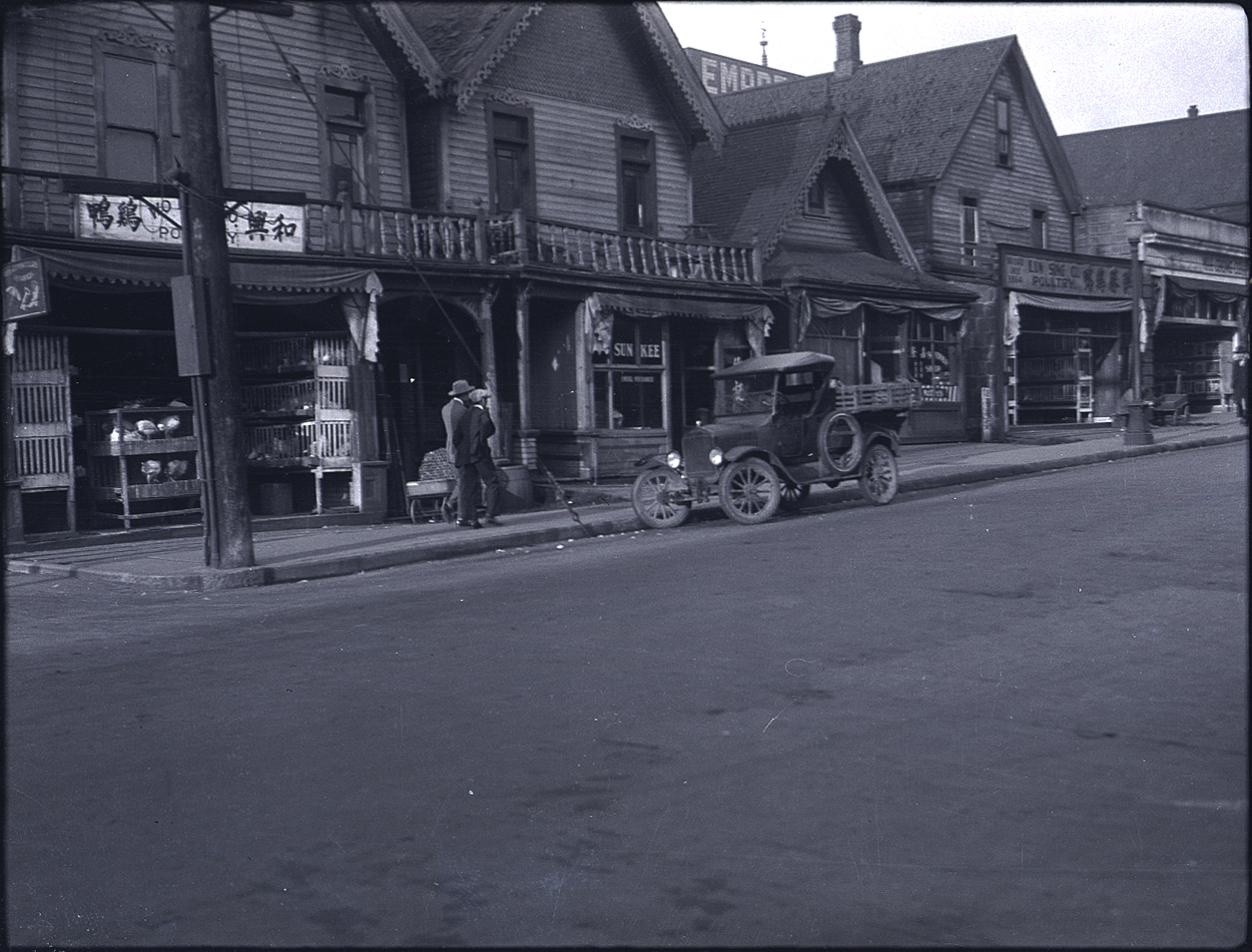
Vancouver's Chinatown in 1927

Chinatown is a neighbourhood in Vancouver, British Columbia, and is Canada's largest Chinatown. Centred around Pender Street, it is surrounded by Gastown to the north, the Downtown financial and central business districts to the west, the Georgia Viaduct and the False Creek inlet to the south, the Downtown Eastside and the remnant of old Japantown to the northeast, and the residential neighbourhood of Strathcona to the southeast.

Due to the large ethnic Chinese presence in Vancouver—especially represented by mostly Cantonese-speaking multi-generation Chinese Canadians and first-generation immigrants from Hong Kong—the city has been referred to as "Hongcouver". However, most immigration in recent years has been Mandarin-speaking residents from Mainland China. Chinatown remains a popular tourist attraction and is one of the largest historic Chinatowns in North America, but it experienced a recent decline as newer members of Vancouver's Chinese community dispersed to other parts of the metropolitan area.

== Geography ==
The approximate borders of Chinatown as designated by the City of Vancouver are the alley between Pender and Hastings Streets, Georgia Street, Gore Avenue, and Taylor Street, although unofficially the area extends well into the rest of the Downtown Eastside. Main, Pender, and Keefer Streets are the principal areas of commercial activity.

Selected locations in Chinatown, Vancouver
- Points of interest
- Parks and open spaces
1 Millennium Gate
2 International Village Mall
3 Sam Kee Building
4 Dr. Sun Yat-Sen Classical Chinese Garden
5 Andy Livingstone Park
6 Chinese Canadian Museum
7 Chinese Cultural Centre
8 Chinese Benevolent Association of Vancouver
9 Chinatown Storytelling Centre
10 Carnegie Community Centre
11 Kuomintang Building

== History ==
=== Early immigration and head tax ===
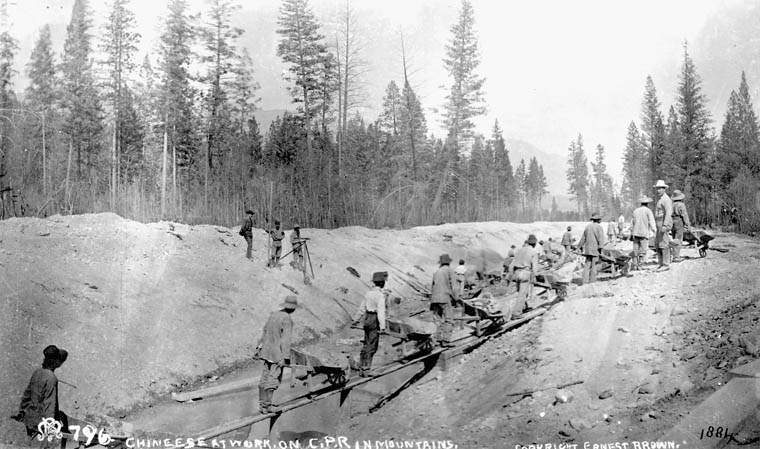
Chinese railway construction workers for CP Rail, 1884

Chinese immigrants, primarily men, first came to Vancouver in large numbers during the late 19th century, attracted in part by the British Columbia gold rush of 1858 and then the construction of the Canadian Pacific Railway in the 1880s. In the census of 1880–81, the total Chinese population in Canada was 4,383, of which the overwhelming majority (4,350) resided in British Columbia. By 1884, 17,000 Chinese immigrants had arrived in Canada to work on the railroad alone. The 1891 census counted 9,129 Chinese in Canada (8,910 in British Columbia), and the population at the 1901 census had increased to 16,792 in Canada (14,376 in British Columbia as an incomplete count). Of the estimated 16,000 Chinese immigrants in British Columbia in 1901, 2,715 lived in Victoria and another 2,011 lived in Vancouver.

After the completion of the railroad, under the Chinese Immigration Act of 1885, a head tax of CA$50 per person was levied solely on Chinese immigrants to discourage further settlement. The head tax was raised to $100 in 1900 and then $500 in 1903.

By 1900, Chinatown covered the four square blocks bounded by Canton Alley (on the west), Hastings Street (on the north), Keefer Street (on the south), and Main Street (on the east, named Westminster Avenue at the time), with Pender Street (then called Dupont) as the main commercial district. During this time, Vancouver's Red Light district was present in the area, undergoing routine police checks and attempts to clean up the area. By 1906, the Dupont brothels were forced to close. As a result, several brothels and businesses moved to two parallel dirt paved, dead-end lanes off of Dupont, West of Carrall: Shanghai Alley and Canton Alley. While these immigrants were dispersed throughout Chinatown, they strongly concentrated these areas. In 1896, the health officer for the City of Vancouver reported the city had to destroy houses in Chinatown "owing to their filthy condition" and that "one could hardly pass through the [Chinatown] quarter without holding one's nose." Another health officer noted "The Chinese merchants and employers of labour endeavour to assist the health officials, and are, as a rule, willing to co-operate and help in this matter, but the lower classes of Chinese emigrants give a great deal of trouble unless constantly watched," concluding that continued immigration would lead to "circumstances and conditions which predispose to infectious disease, and serve to spread it rapidly when once it is roused into activity." This perception only worsened with the turn of the district. Residents of the area where said to face continuous "white hostility and discrimination" due to three main vices, drug problems, gambling and sex work. As these perceptions grew, the discrimination turned to violence, resulting in a destructive raid in 1907 that caused irreversible damage to the area.

=== Clan societies and 1907 riot ===
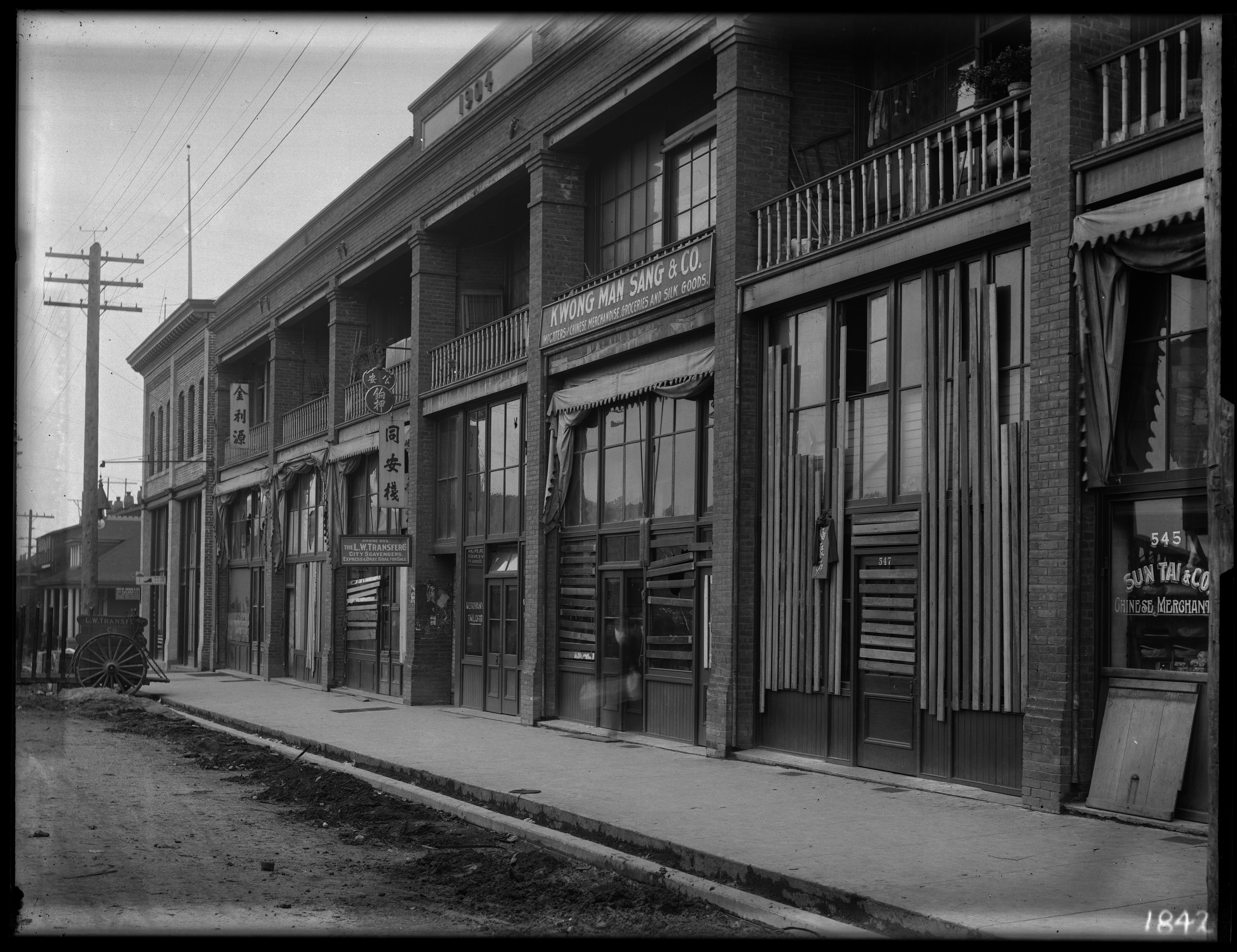
Boarded storefronts on Carrall Street following September 1907 riots

As more people of Chinese heritage came to Vancouver, clan associations were formed to help the newcomers assimilate in their adopted homeland and to provide friendship and support. Clan societies were often formed around a shared surname lineage, county (e.g., Kaiping, Zhongshan), or other feature of identity.

Despite these efforts, discrimination against residents of the area continued to grow and eventually turned to violence. The Vancouver riots of September 1907 grew out of an anti-immigration rally being held by the Asiatic Exclusion League, resulting in significant damage to Chinatown businesses. 2,000 Chinese immigrants were displaced from their homes, and total property damage resulting from the actions of the mob of 10,000 was estimated at $15,000. One news report speculated the riot was held to intimidate a visiting Japanese delegate. Another blamed the presence of American agitators. Mackenzie King, then the Deputy Minister of Labour, was dispatched to investigate the riot and recommended the disbursement of $36,000 in compensation.

The head tax was repealed via the Chinese Immigration Act of 1923, which instead abolished Chinese immigration to Canada entirely, except in limited circumstances.

=== Late 20th century improvements ===
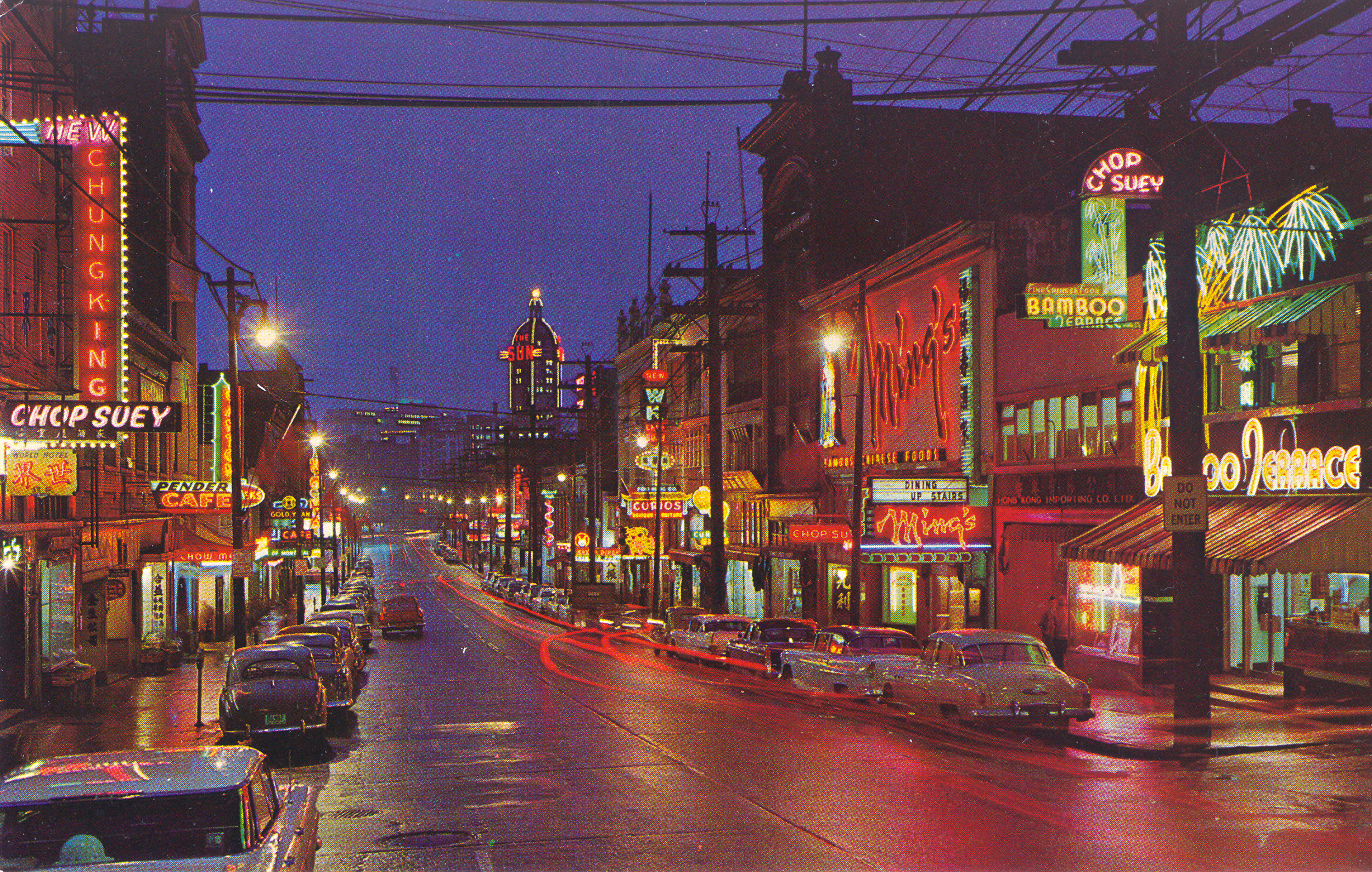
Chinatown c. 1950s

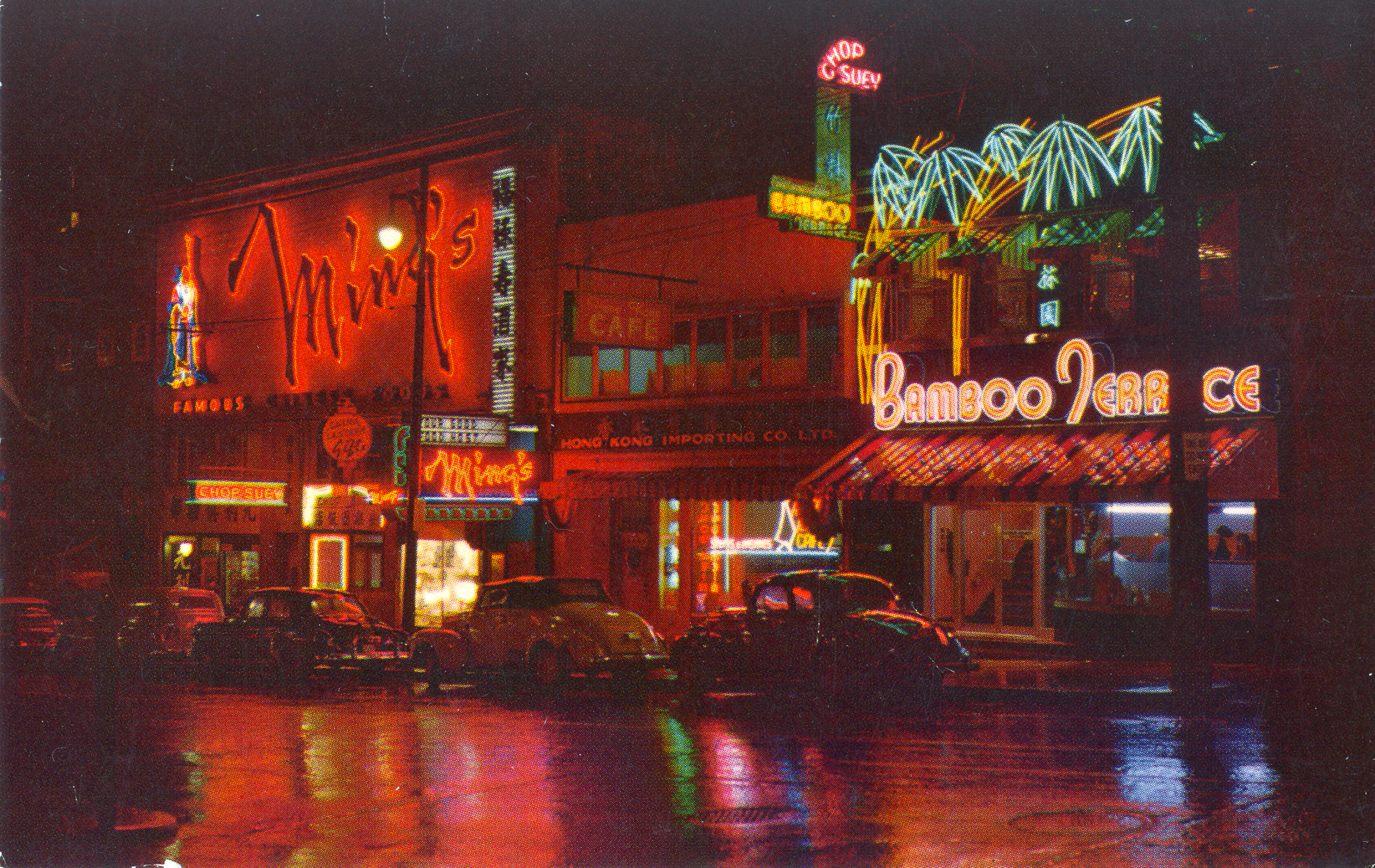
Chinatown c. 1950s

In 1979, the Chinatown Historic Area Planning Committee sponsored a streetscape improvement program to add various Chinese-style elements to the area, such as specially paved sidewalks and red dragon streetlamps that demarcated the area's borders while emphasizing it as a destination for heritage tourism. Starting with its designation by the province as a historic area in 1971 and subsequent economic shifts, Chinatown shifted from a central business district to playing a largely cultural role. Murality, a local non-profit, is installing a mural on East Pender Street with the aim of bringing colour and vitality to the neighbourhood.

The growth of Chinatown during much of the 20th century created a healthy, robust community that gradually became an aging one as many Chinese immigrants no longer lived nearby. Noticing local businesses suffering, the Chinatown Merchants Association cited the lack of parking and restrictive heritage district rules as impediments to new uses and renovations. Their concerns subsequently led to a relaxation of zoning laws to allow for a wider range of uses, including necessary demolition. Additions in the mid-1990s included a large parkade, a shopping mall, and the largest Chinese restaurant in Canada. More residential projects around the community and a lowering of property taxes helped to maintain a more rounded community. Reinvigoration was a discussed topic along government members, symbolically embedded in the Millennium Gate project, which opened in 2002.

=== Recent immigration ===
In addition to Han Chinese from Taiwan, Hong Kong, and Mainland China, Chinese Latin Americans have also settled in the Chinatown area. Most of them were from Peru and arrived shortly after Juan Velasco Alvarado took over that country in a military coup in 1968. Others have come from Argentina, Brazil, Mexico, and Nicaragua.

Vancouver experienced large numbers of immigrants from the Asia-Pacific region in the last two decades of the twentieth century, most notably from China, whose population in the Vancouver Census Metropolitan Area was estimated at 300,000 in the mid-1990s.

== Businesses and development ==
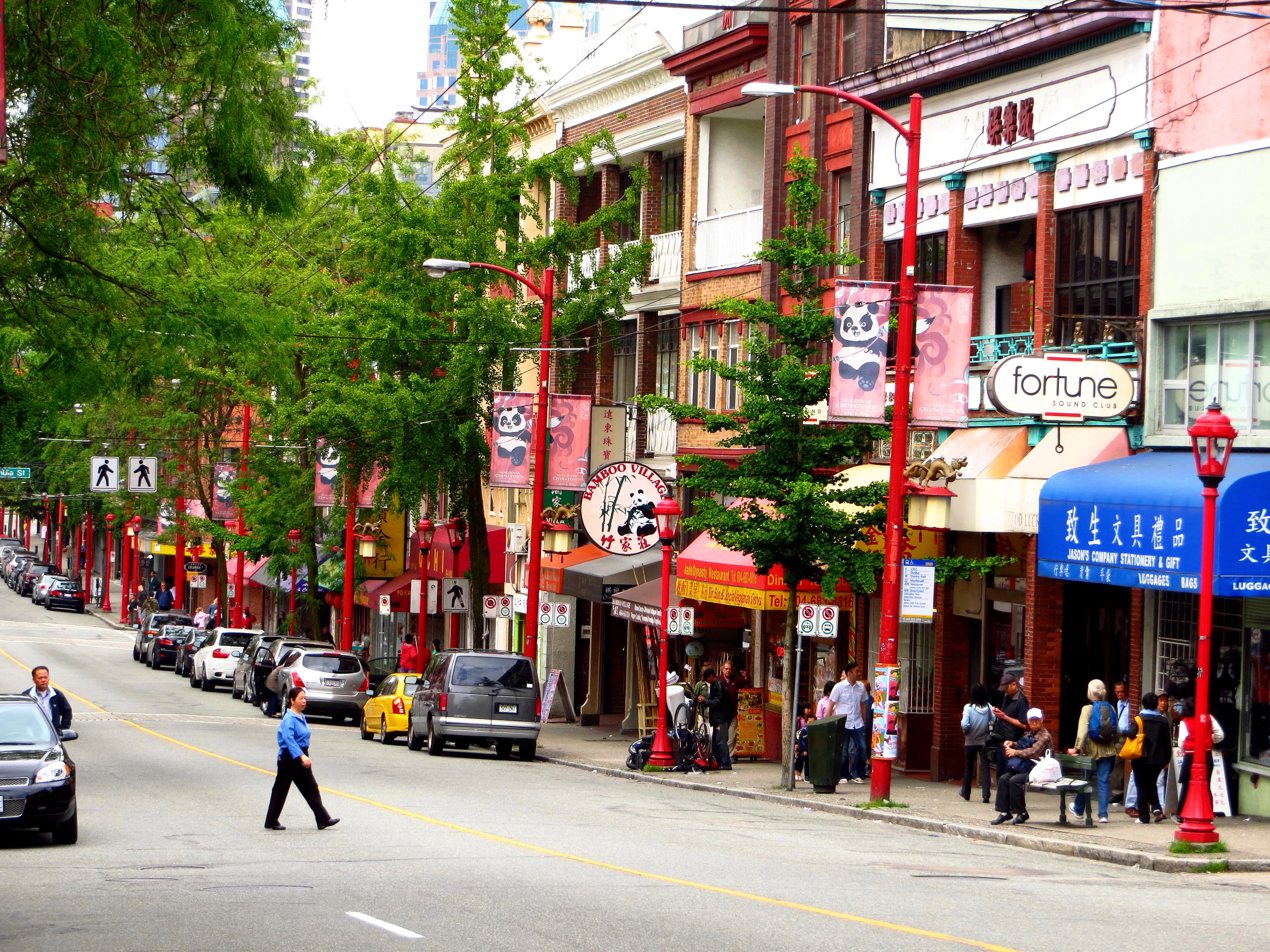
Street in Chinatown, 2012

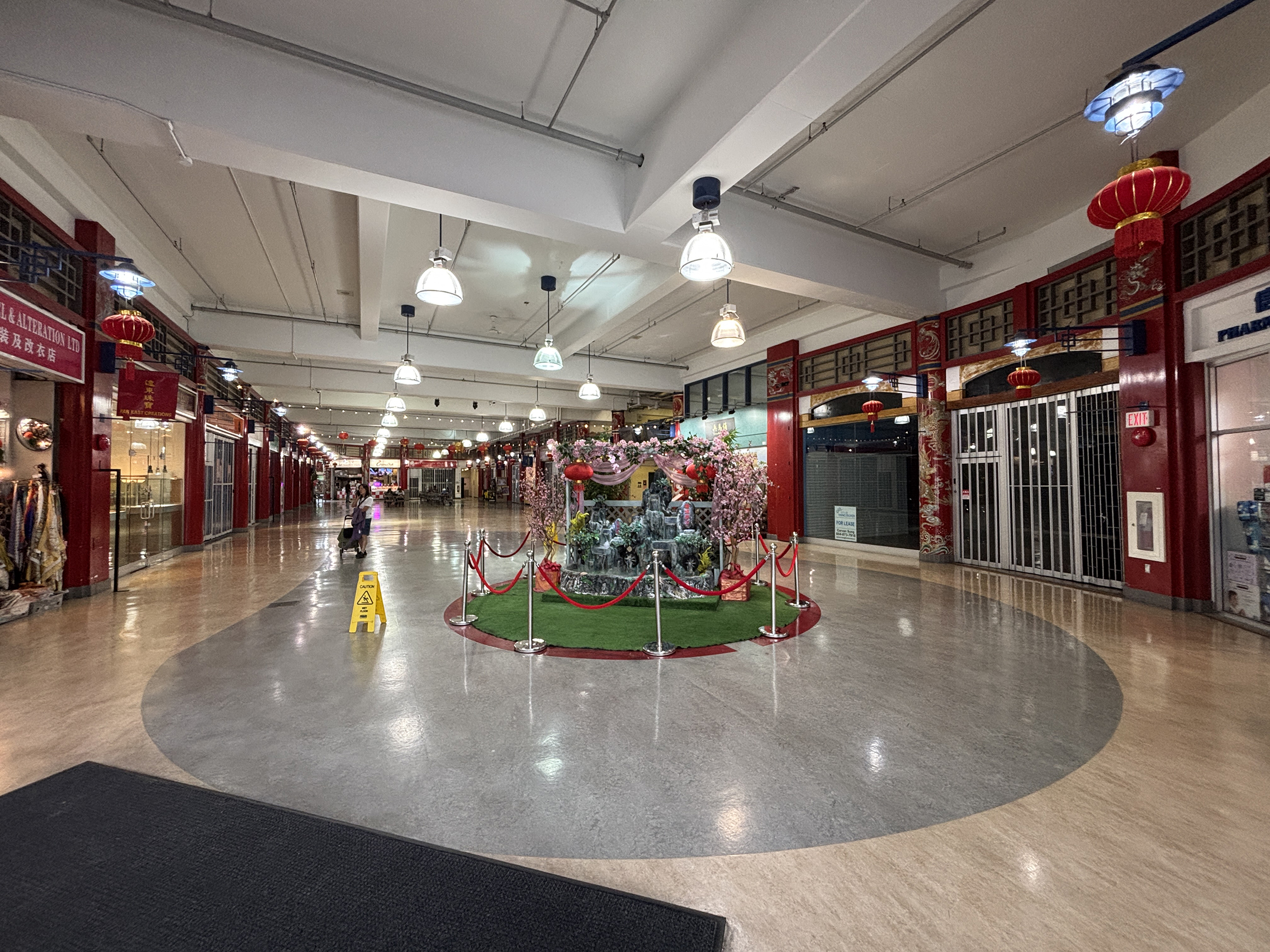
Vacant shops in Chinatown Plaza

Chinatown is becoming more prosperous as new investment and old traditional businesses flourish. Today the neighbourhood features many traditional restaurants, banks, markets, clinics, tea shops, clothing stores, and other shops catering to the local community and tourists alike. The Vancouver office of Sing Tao Daily, one of the city's four Chinese-language dailies, remains in Chinatown. OMNI British Columbia (formerly Channel M) had its television studio in Chinatown from 2003 to 2010. Vancouver Film School also has a satellite location in Chinatown. A bar & nightclub known as ‘Fortune Sound Club’ is situated within the heart of Chinatown.

Chinatown's businesses today predominantly consist of those selling lower-order, working-class goods, such as groceries, tea shops, and souvenir stores. While some businesses, such as restaurants, stand out, they are no longer the only Chinese food establishments in the city, a shift that contributed to a visible decline in foot traffic and nighttime activity in Chinatown. As the vacancy rate in Chinatown currently stands at 10%, it has been acknowledged that Chinatown needs a new approach to development, since some businesses have relocated to suburban shopping centres while others simply retired or went out of business. Examples include the closing of some restaurants and shops, sometimes in instances where the family did not have successors or where the business could not sustain itself any longer. Although there is a considerable business vacancy, Chinatown lease rates are considered the cheapest in the city, at $15–$30 per square foot—about one-tenth of the asking price on Vancouver's Downtown Robson Street, the city's upscale shopping district.

The new Chinatown business plan encourages new entrepreneurs to move in—and has attracted a longboard store and German sausage shop—as ways of restoring storefronts and bringing in a younger crowd, and to make higher-income people more comfortable in the area. Attracted to the lower rent and the building's heritage status, younger businesses have moved in, often with white owners who also live in apartments above the shops. The general consensus is that Chinatown's priority is to attract people of all backgrounds to Chinatown, and it is believed that the opening of non-traditional stores will bring a new flow of energy and income to the streets. As a result, the commercial activity is becoming more diversified, dotted with Western chain stores. Other additions include vintage stores, two art galleries, bars, and a nightclub, built on the site of the former Ming's restaurant, in an attempt to bring something of a nightlife atmosphere, reminiscent of the 1950s and 1960s, back to the neighbourhood. The diversity of new shops and businesses is believed to be necessary in creating a new image for Chinatown in order to bring vibrancy back to the area and encourage commercial activities in general, and as a way to compete with suburban districts as well as nearby Gastown and Downtown Vancouver.

=== Chinatown Revitalization Action Plan ===
The Chinatown Historic Area planning committee, along with AECOM Economics, a US-based planning firm, helped to prepare a Chinatown Revitalization Action Plan for Vancouver's planning department in November 2011. Vancouver planners surveyed 77 businesses and found that 64% reported a decrease in revenue between 2008 and 2011. The majority of consumers, 58%, were local residents, with 21% coming from elsewhere in the Lower Mainland. Tourist spending accounted for only 12% of Chinatown customers.

=== Condominium development ===
Vancouver city councillors voted in 2011 to raise building height restrictions in Chinatown in order to boost its population density. A limit of 9 stories for most of the neighbourhood was set, with a maximum of 15 stories on the busiest streets.

== Architecture ==
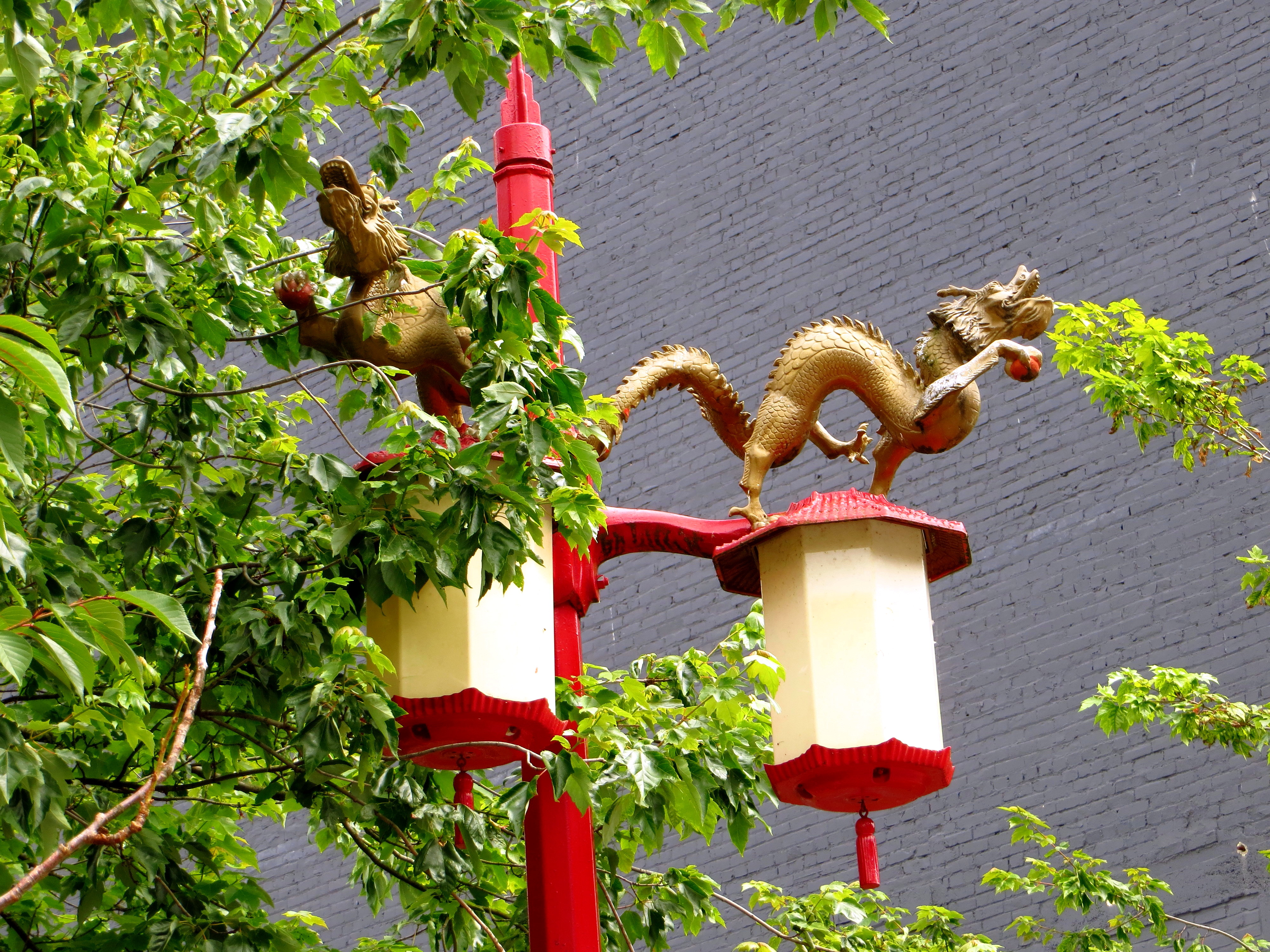
Chinese themed street-light in Chinatown

The neighbourhood was designated a National Historic Site of Canada in 2011.

Ongoing efforts at revitalization include efforts by the business community to improve safety by hiring private security, considering new marketing promotions, and introducing residential units into the neighbourhood by restoring and renovating heritage buildings. The current focus is on the restoration and adaptive reuse of the distinctive association buildings.

Historically significant buildings and structures in Chinatown, Vancouver
| Name | № | Street | Builder / Designer | Year | Built by / for | Notes | Photo |
|---|---|---|---|---|---|---|---|
| Sam Kee Building | 8 | West Pender Street | Kennerly Bryan, William C. F. Gillam | 1913 | Chang Toy (Sam Kee Company) | Narrowest commercial building in the world, according to the Guinness Book of Records; ground floor depth is only 4 ft 11 in (1.50 m). | |
| Wing Sang Building | 51 | East Pender Street | Thomas Ennor Julian | 1889–1901 | Yip Sang (Wing Sang Company) | One of the oldest buildings in Chinatown. The 6-storey building was home to Yip Sang's Wing Sang Company (Wing Sang Limited) from 1889 to 1955. T.E. Julian added third storey in 1901. | |
| Chinese Freemasons Building | 1–5 | West Pender Street | S.B. Birds | 1906, 1913 | | Modified by Samuel Buttrey Birds in 1913. Facade retained after building was demolished in 1975. | |
| Chinese Benevolent Association of Vancouver | 104–108 | East Pender Street | | 1901–1910 | Chinese Benevolent Association | The Association was organized by leading businessmen including Yip Sang, Chang Toy, and Wang Yu Shan. | |
| Dr. Sun Yat-Sen Classical Chinese Garden | 578 | Carrall St | Joe Wai, Donald Vaughan, Wang Zu-Xin | 1986 | | | |
| Lim Sai Hor Association Building | 525–531 | Carrall Street | Samuel Buttrey Birds, W. H. Chow | 1903, 1914 | Chinese Empire Reform Association | Altered in 1914, keeping with the contemporary style of Chinatown buildings. | |
| Mah Society of Canada | 137–139 | East Pender Street | H.B. Watson, E.J. Boughen | 1913, 1921 | | Originally housed street-level grocery with residences above; top storey added in 1921 for Mah Society. | |
| Yue Shan Society | 33–47 | East Pender St. | W.H. Chow | 1889, 1898, 1920 | | Consists of three buildings around a central courtyard: 41–47 E Pender (1889), 33–39 E Pender (1920), and 37 E Pender (1914). | |
| Chinese Times Building | 1 | East Pender Street | William Tuff Whiteway | 1902 | Yip Sang (Wing Sang Company) | One of the first brick buildings in Chinatown; influenced later architecture. | |
| Chinese School | 121–125 | East Pender Street | J.A. Radford and G.L. Southall | 1910, 1921 | Mon Keang School | Altered by Radford in 1921. Mon Keang School established in 1925. | |
| Lee Association Building | 127–131 | East Pender Street | Henriquez and Todd | 1907, 1973 | Lee's Benevolent Association | Original building was damaged in a 1972 fire and demolished; the facade was retained and a new building was constructed behind it in 1973, designed by Henriquez and Todd. | |
| Carnegie Community Centre | 401 | Main Street | G.W. Grant | 1902–03 | Vancouver Public Library; later as Vancouver Museum and City Archives | Carnegie library from its construction until 1957. | |
| Commercial Buildings | 235–257 | East Hastings Street | | 1901–1913 | | Includes the Hotel Empress (235), Phoenix Hotel (237), Belmont Building (241), and Afton Hotel (249). | |
| Hotel East | 445 | Gore Street | S.B. Birds | 1912 | Lee Kee | Part of the expansion of Chinatown to east of Main. | |
| Kuomintang Building | 296 | East Pender Street | W.E. Sproat | 1920 | The Kuomintang (KMT, or Chinese Nationalist League) | | |
| Chin Wing Chun Society | 158–160 | East Pender Street | R.A. McKenzie | 1925 | Chin Wing Chun Society | Meeting rooms above street-level commercial space. | |
| Ho Ho Restaurant and Sun Ah Hotel | 100–102 | East Pender Street | R.T. Perry and White and Cockrill | 1911 | Loo Gee Wing | Ho Ho Restaurant opened in 1954. | |
| May Wah Hotel | 258 | East Pender Street | William Frederick Gardiner | 1913 | Messrs. Barrett and Deane | SRO hotel; built in response to the Lodging House By-Law of 1910. Used by both Chau Luen Society and Shon Yee Benevolent Association of Canada. | |
| Chau Luen Tower | 325 | Keefer | | 1971 | Chau Luen Benevolent Society | | |

=== Gates ===
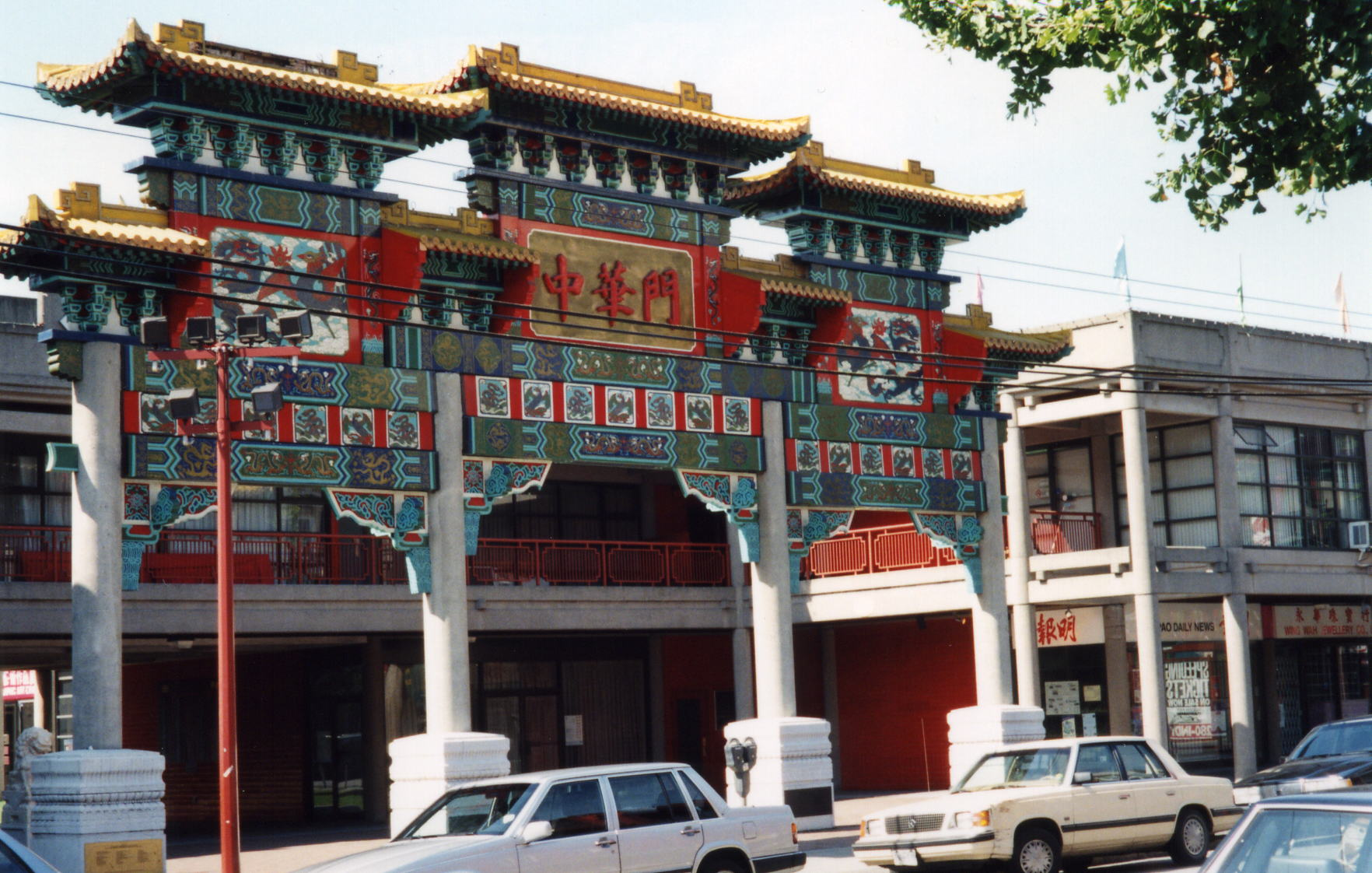
As-built for Expo 86 (1995)

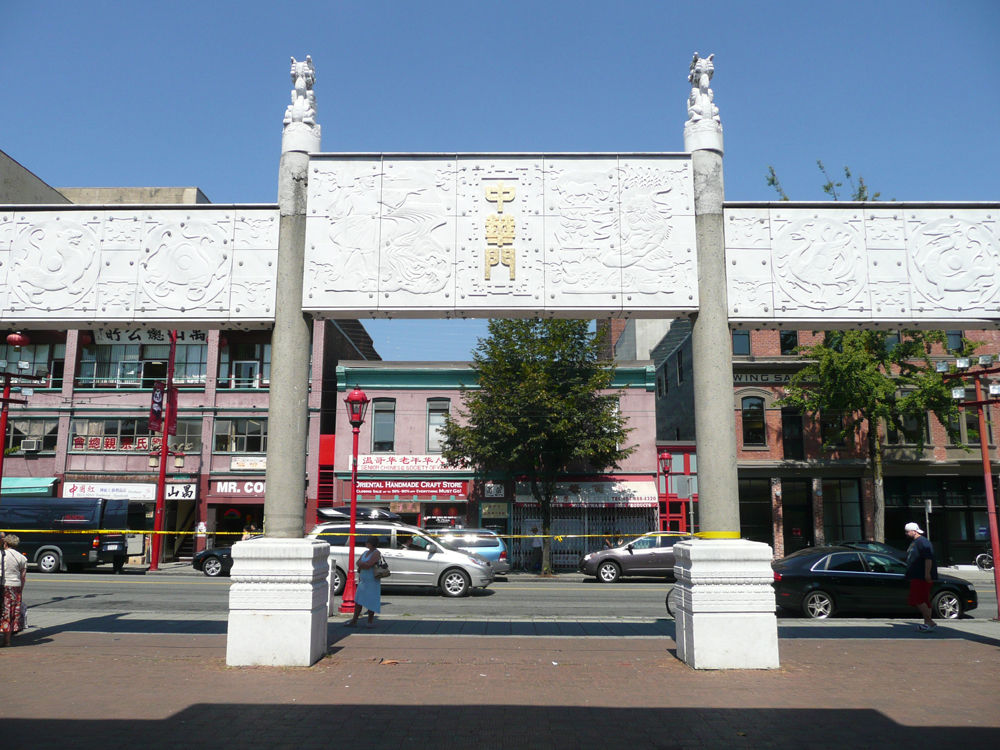
Rebuilt in 2005 (2010)

China Gate on Pender Street (by Chinese Cultural Centre)

The China Gate (next to the Chinese Cultural Centre, near the intersection with Carrall) facing Pender Street was donated to the City of Vancouver by the Government of the People's Republic of China following the Expo 86 world's fair, where it was on display. After being displayed for almost 20 years at its current location, the gate was rebuilt and received a major renovation of its façade employing stone and steel. Funding for the renovation came from government and private sources; the renovated gate was unveiled during the October 2005 visit of Guangdong governor Huang Huahua.

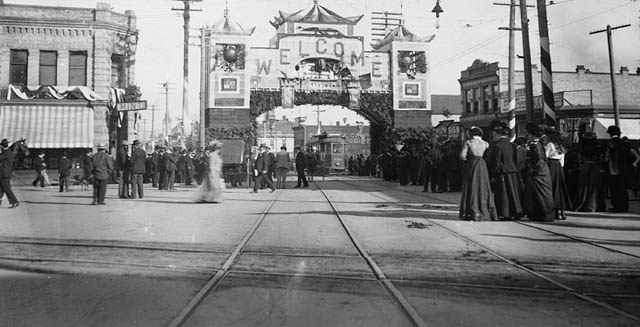
Temporary welcome arch (1901)

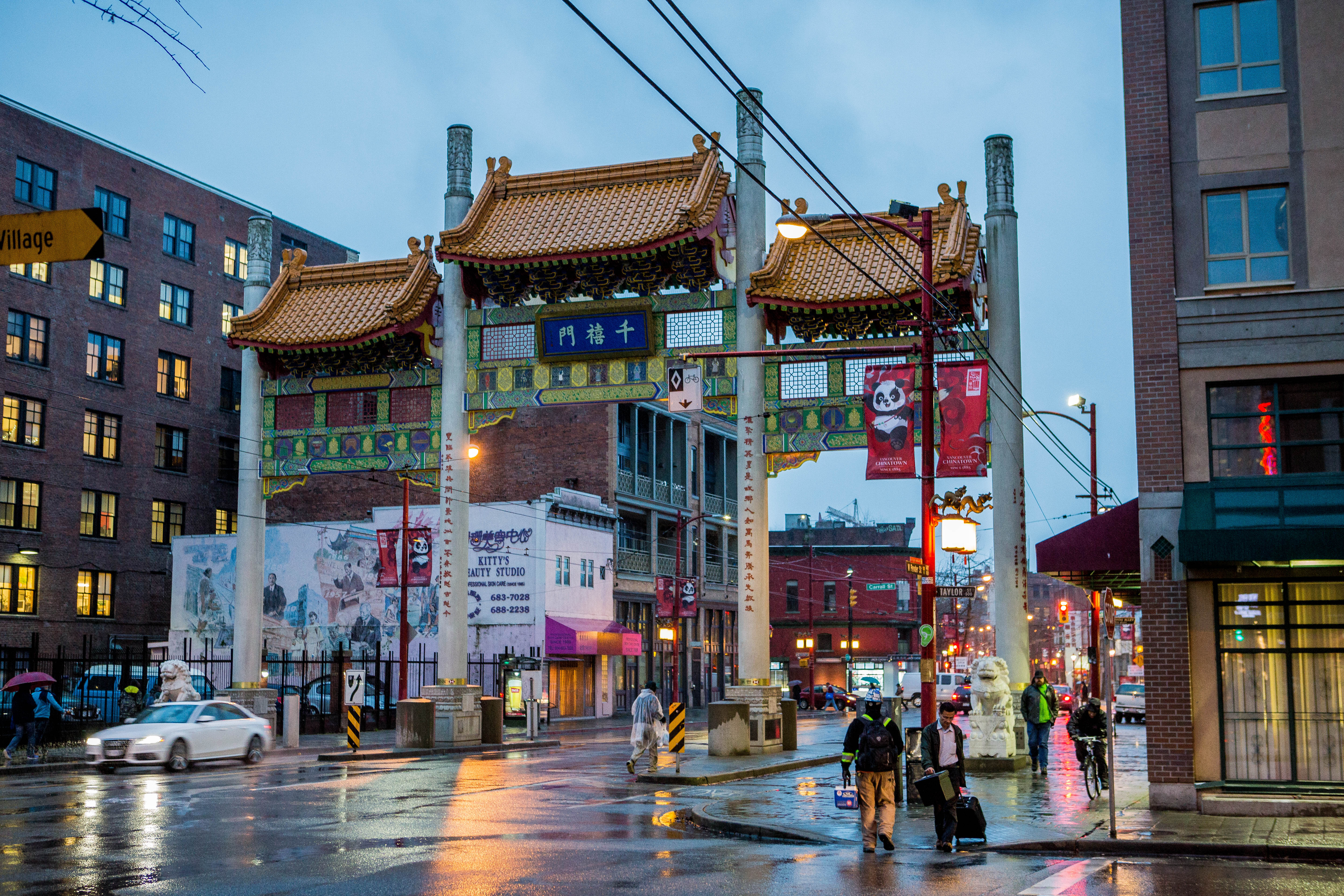
Millennium Gate (2015)

Gates straddling Pender Street

This is not to be confused with the larger Millennium Gate, which straddles Pender Street at the west end of Chinatown, near the intersection with Taylor Street. The Millennium Gate was approved on September 20, 2001, and erected in 2002 at the same site as a temporary wooden arch built to celebrate the 1901 royal tour by the Duke and Duchess of Cornwall and York. Joe Y. Wai designed the Millennium Gate.

=== Neon signs ===
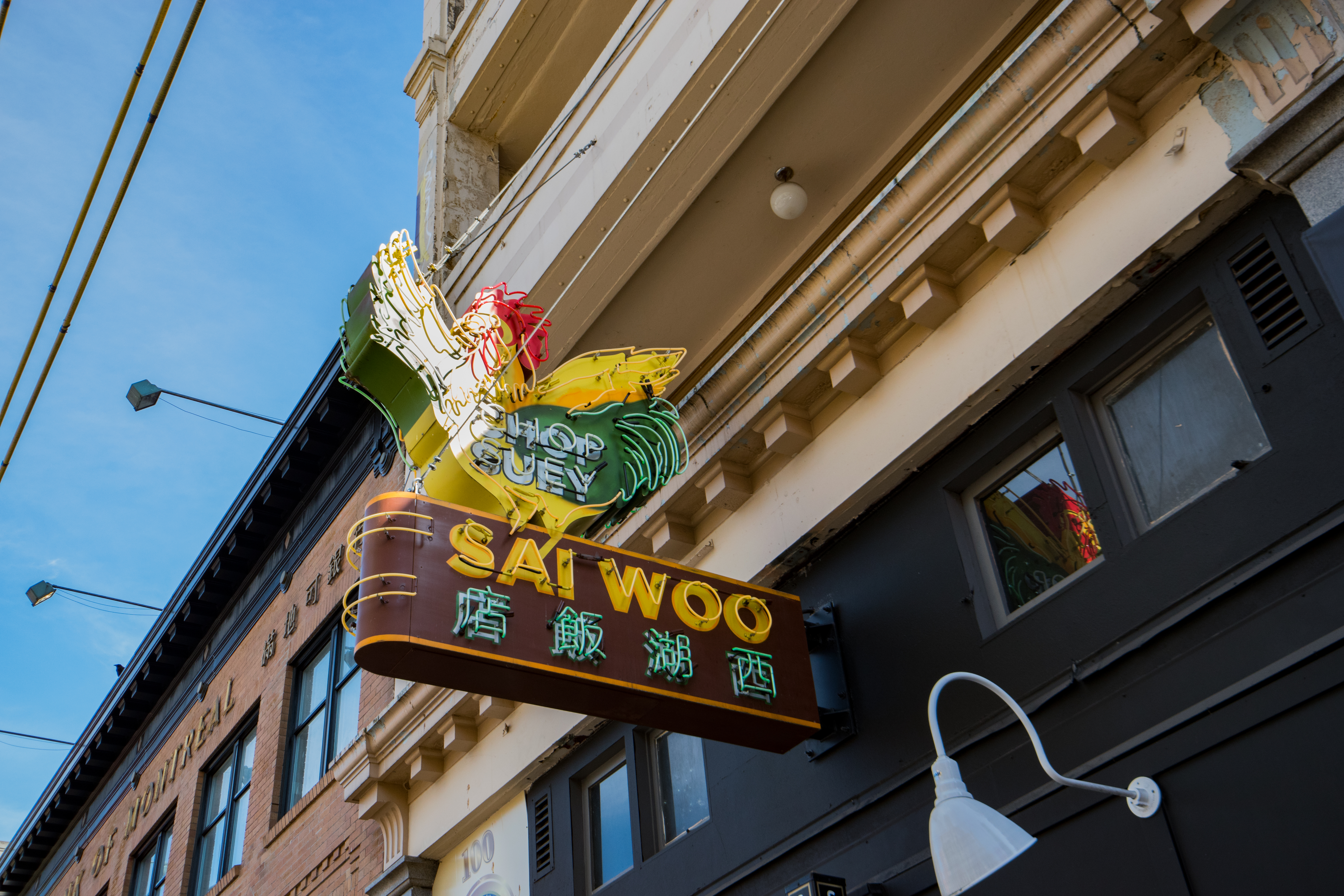
Reconstructed Sai Woo sign

Chinatown was once known for its neon signs, but like the rest of the city, lost many signs to changing times and a sign bylaw passed in 1974. The last of these was the Ho Ho sign (which showed a rice bowl and chop sticks), which was removed in 1997.

A large 45 ft (14 m) tall neon sign was approved for the Chinatown Plaza parkade project in 2008 under the City of Vancouver's Great Beginnings initiative. The new sign was installed in March 2010.

In 2017, a neon sign featuring a large green and yellow-coloured rooster for the Sai Woo Restaurant was installed on Pender Street. The new owner of the Sai Woo was made aware of the original sign that hung outside the earlier incarnation of the restaurant (1925–59) from a one-second clip from a movie of a 1958 parade in Chinatown, and launched a search for the original sign which was unsuccessful. The sign was recreated from the archived footage. At the same time, plans were announced to relight the tall Ho Ho sign in 2018 or 2019.

=== Laozi Mural ===
Vancouver's Laozi (also referred to "Lao Tzu" and "Lao Tsu", 老子) mural is located on the Western wall of the Lee's Association building, at the corner of Gore Avenue and Pender Street, on the boundary of Chinatown. The mural was unveiled on October 2, 2010, by the Mayor of the City of Vancouver, Gregor Robertson. as part of the celebration of the 125 years of Vancouver's Chinatown. The mural is featured in multiple lists of notable Vancouver murals.

It was designed by Kenson Seto and painted by Alex Li & Falk. The mural is 223 square metres, and cost $18,000 which was split between the City of Vancouver and Lee's Association of Vancouver. It was defaced multiple times by graffiti, causing outrage in the community.

On April 5, 2016, the City of Vancouver rezoned the lot at 303 E Pender St/450 Gore Avenue, allowing construction of a six-story building that hid the mural from sight. The building, marketed as Brixton Flats was designed by architect Gair Williamson and developed by GMC Projects Inc., whose website features an image of the Laozi mural.

Vancouver City Council added a condition to the rezoning:

"Design development to create a new mural to reflect the character and history of Chinatown;

Note to Applicant: The intent is not to recreate the existing mural, but rather to seek a viable opportunity to create a new mural of a suitable size and location on the building, including possible location on the eastern side of the building."

The developer is studying the possibility of painting a smaller version of the original mural on the new building.

== Notable residents ==
- Wong Foon Sien, journalist and social activist
- Bessie Lee, community organizer and civic activist
- Mary Lee Chan, civic activist
- Yip Sang, businessman
- Yucho Chow, photographer
- Wayson Choy, author, educator

== Community groups ==
- Hua Foundation, non-profit building community engagement in environmentalism and sustainability

== See also ==
- Chinese Benevolent Association of Vancouver
- Chinese Canadians in British Columbia
- Chinese Canadians in Greater Vancouver
- Chinese Canadians in the Greater Toronto Area
- History of Chinese immigration to Canada
- Chinese head tax in Canada
- Royal Commission on Chinese Immigration (1885)
- Chinese Immigration Act of 1885
- Chinese Immigration Act, 1923
- Everything Will Be, Julia Kwan's 2014 documentary film about Chinatown
