= Kuomintang Building (Vancouver) =

Historic building in Vancouver's Chinatown

- 國民黨大樓
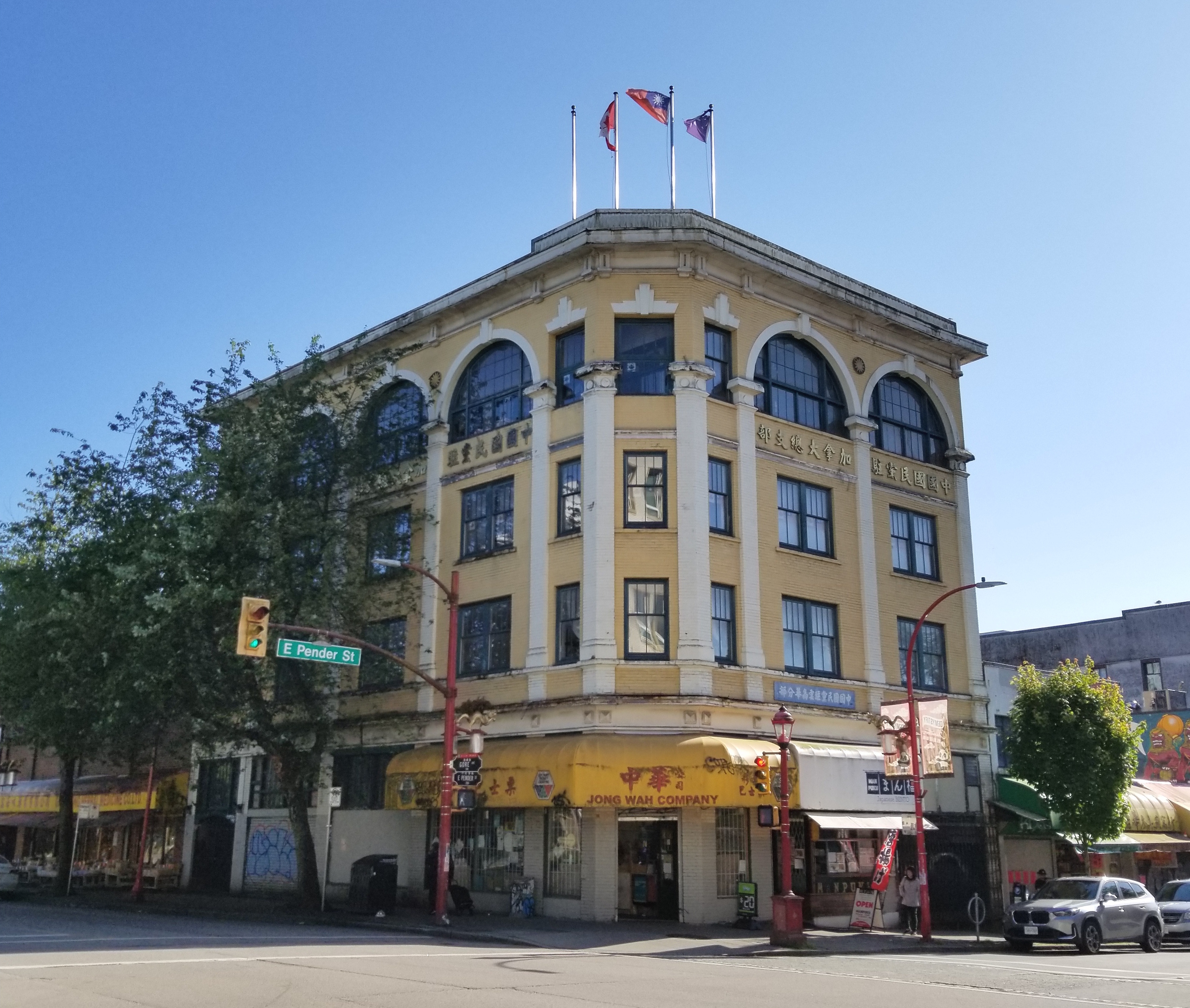
- The Kuomintang Building in 2025
- Interactive map of the Kuomintang Building area
- Alternative names: Chinese Nationalist League Building

General information
- Location: 525 Gore Avenue, Vancouver, British Columbia, Canada
- Coordinates: 49°16′48.7″N 123°5′51.2″W
- Named for: Kuomintang
- Year built: 1920
- Opened: May 4, 1921; 104 years ago

Technical details
- Floor count: 4

Design and construction
- Architect: W. E. Sproat

National Historic Site of Canada
- Official name: Nationalist League Building
- Designated: January 14, 2003
- Reference no.: 2744

Chinese name
- Traditional Chinese: 國民黨大樓
- Simplified Chinese: 国民党大楼
Transcriptions
Standard Mandarin
- Hanyu Pinyin: Guómíndǎng Dàlóu
- Wade–Giles: Kuo^{2}-min^{2}-tang^{3} Ta^{4}-lou^{2}
Yue: Cantonese
- Jyutping: Gwok^{3}man^{4}dong^{2} Daai^{6}lau^{4*2}
other Yue
- Taishanese: Gok^{2}min^{3}ong^{2} Ai^{5}leu^{3}

The Kuomintang Building (Chinese: 國民黨大樓), also known as the Chinese Nationalist League Building, is a historic four-storey building in Vancouver, British Columbia, Canada. It is located in the southeast corner of the city's Chinatown, at the intersection of Gore Avenue and Pender Street. Opened in 1921, it originally served as the Western Canadian headquarters of the Kuomintang, a Chinese nationalist organization. The Chinese Nationalist League of Canada, the Kuomintang's affiliate in the country, was the original owner of the building. The building has historically been used for various social and commercial functions in addition to political activities.

== Construction and architecture ==
The prolific architect W. E. Sproat designed the building with the goal of creating something that would stand out in Chinatown to symbolize its importance. Construction took place throughout 1920, on the historical eastern border of Chinatown and Vancouver proper. The building was opened on May 4, 1921.

At present, the flags of Canada, the Republic of China, and the Kuomintang fly on the building's rooftop. Large traditional Chinese characters below the fourth floor windows denote the building's former status as the Chinese Nationalist League of Canada's headquarters. The building previously had an open balcony on the Gore Avenue façade, as well as a corner pagoda on the roof, until their removal during a restoration project in the 1980s. The building's blend of Chinese and Western architectural styles was symbolic of the building's location – a meeting point of the Eastern and Western worlds.

== Functions ==
The Kuomintang Building was a centre for local involvement in Chinese politics. It was originally the Western Canadian headquarters of the eponymous Kuomintang, a Chinese nationalist organization that grew out of the revolutionary movement which in 1911 overthrew the last imperial dynasty of China. The building was owned by the Chinese Nationalist League of Canada, the Kuomintang's affiliate in the country, and became a meeting place of local supporters of the 1911 Revolution and later the Nationalist side during the Chinese Civil War.

The building has historically served various other non-political functions. The Chinese Public School, described as "the most important of several Chinese schools operating in Chinatown", held some of its classes inside the building until 1953. The school was funded in part by the government of the Republic of China to promote the Chinese-language and cultural education of Chinese children abroad. Locals also used the building as a venue for important community ceremonies. For example, Jennie Sam Song and David Chue, the first couple wed by the Methodist Chinese Mission in Vancouver, chose the Kuomintang Building as the venue for their wedding reception in 1921. The ground floor has historically housed various wholesale grocers.

== Recognition ==
The Kuomintang Building is listed number 2744 in the Canadian Register of Historic Places.

== In media ==
Canadian author Wayson Choy's 1995 novel The Jade Peony is set in Vancouver's Chinatown in the 1930s. The story features a fictional business named "American Steam Cleaners" that is located inside the Kuomintang Building.
