= Ovaltine Cafe =

Traditional diner in Vancouver, Canada

Coordinates: 49°16′53″N 123°05′54″W

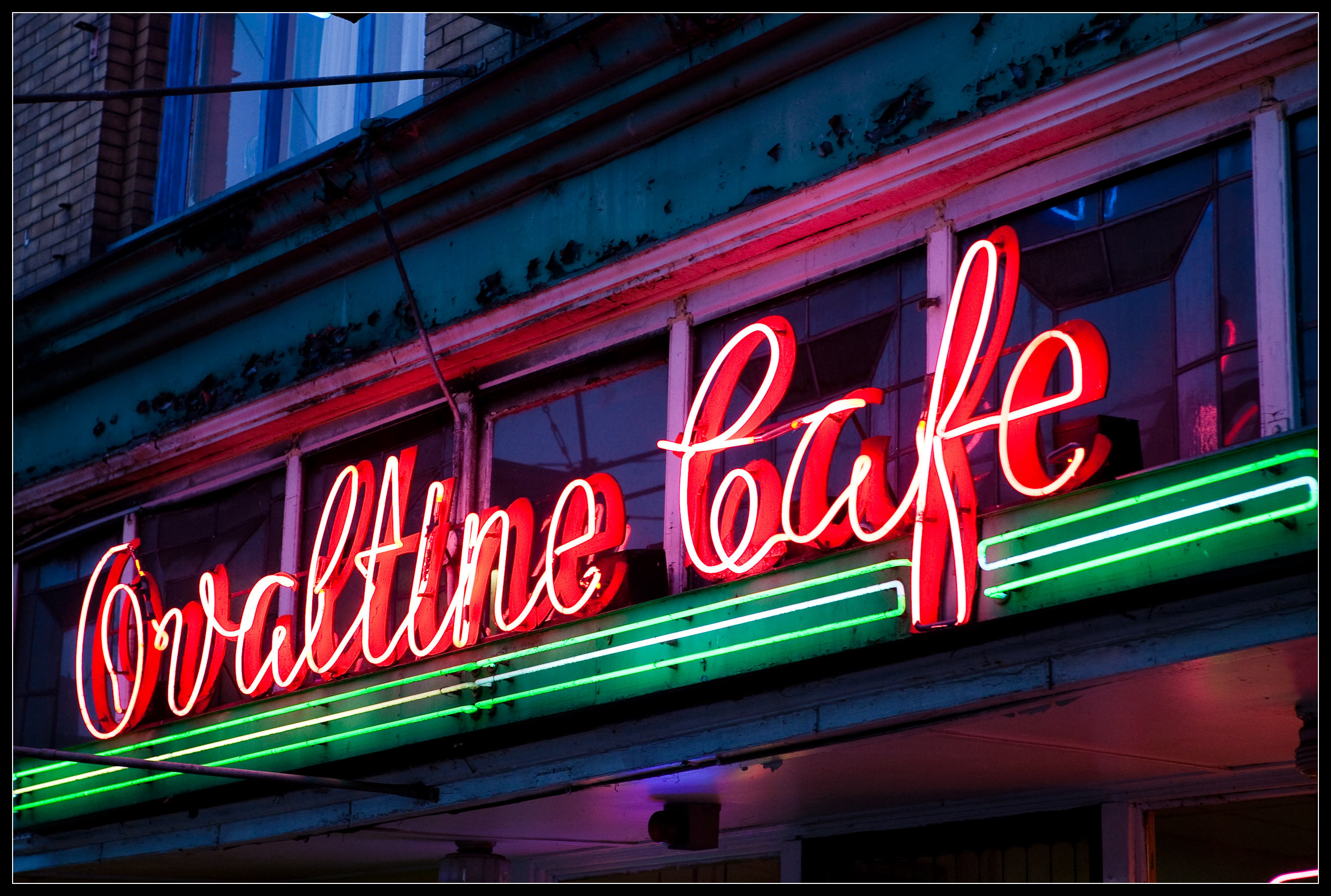

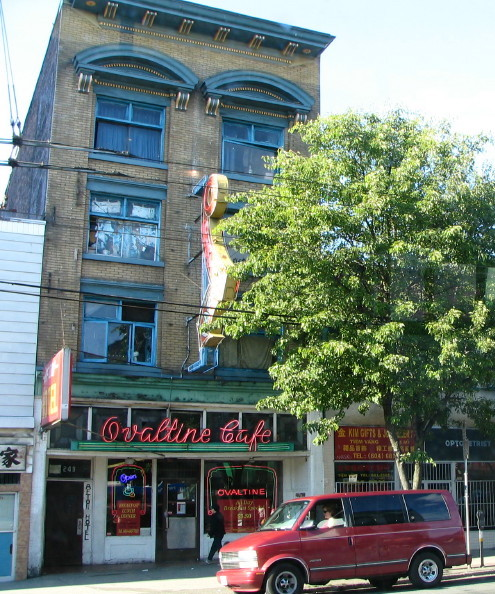
Ovaltine Cafe, 251 East Hastings Street

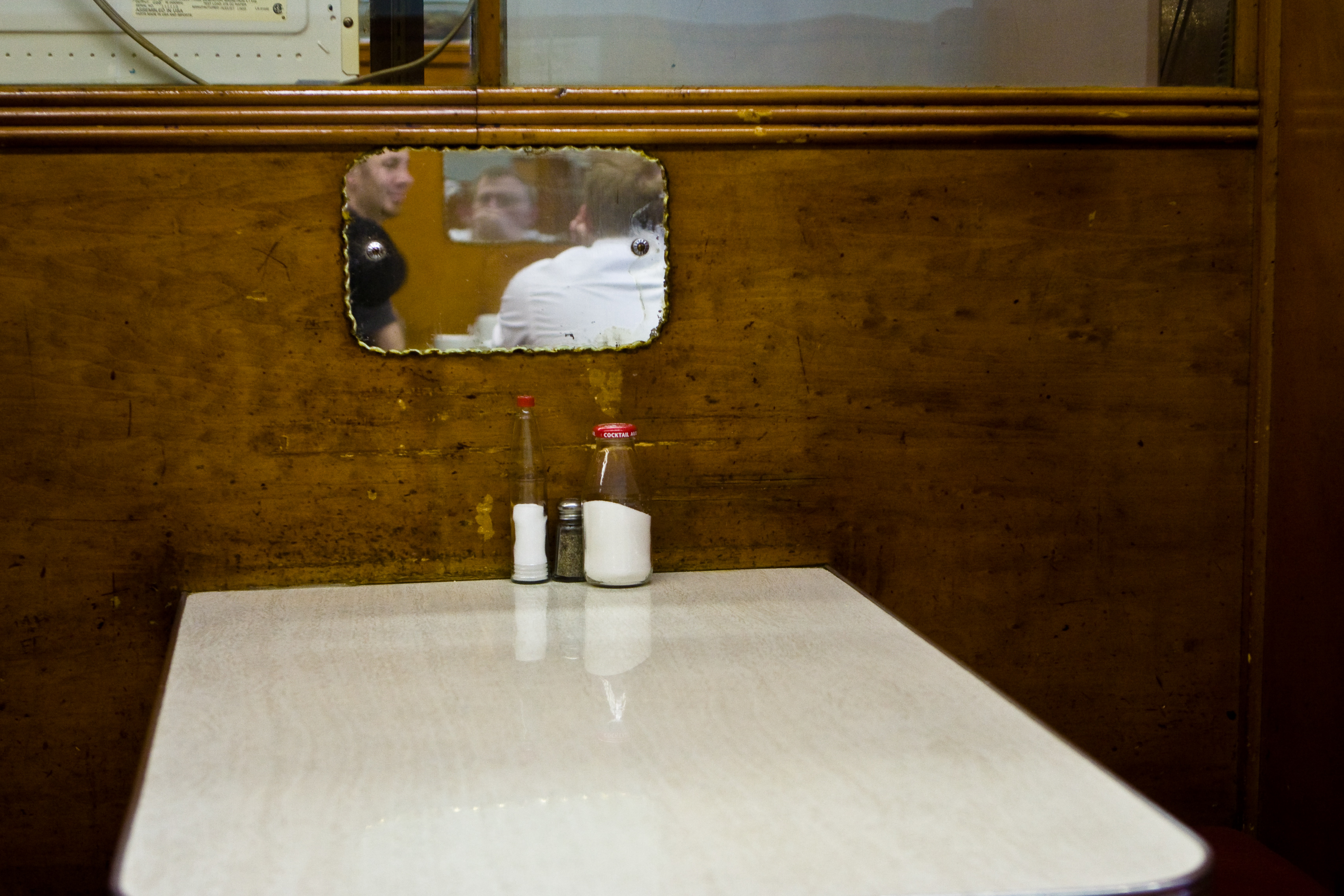
A booth inside the Ovaltine Cafe, 2008, among those used regularly by characters in Da Vinci’s Inquest (1998-2005).

The Ovaltine Cafe is a traditional diner in the Downtown Eastside neighbourhood of Vancouver, British Columbia, Canada, known for its traditional decor. The cafe was opened in 1942, named after the popular Ovaltine drink, and has served as a set for movies and television shows that want to film in a restaurant with an old-fashioned appearance.

On September 15, 2018, Craig Moss, a travel writer with the London newspaper The Telegraph, in consultation with a team of experts, published a list of the world's 50 best cafes, which included the Ovaltine.

Keith McKellar devoted a chapter to the cafe in his book Neon Eulogy, calling it "easily Vancouver's most prized antique cafe."

Randall Wong, the first Chinese-Canadian federal judge in Canada, worked at the Ovaltine in his youth. At that time the Ovaltine was near a court and a police station, and Wong attributed his interest in the law to his conversations with patrons who worked in law enforcement.

== See also ==
- List of restaurants in Vancouver
