= Lim Sai Hor Association Building =

Historic building in Vancouver's Chinatown

- 林西河總堂九牧公所大樓
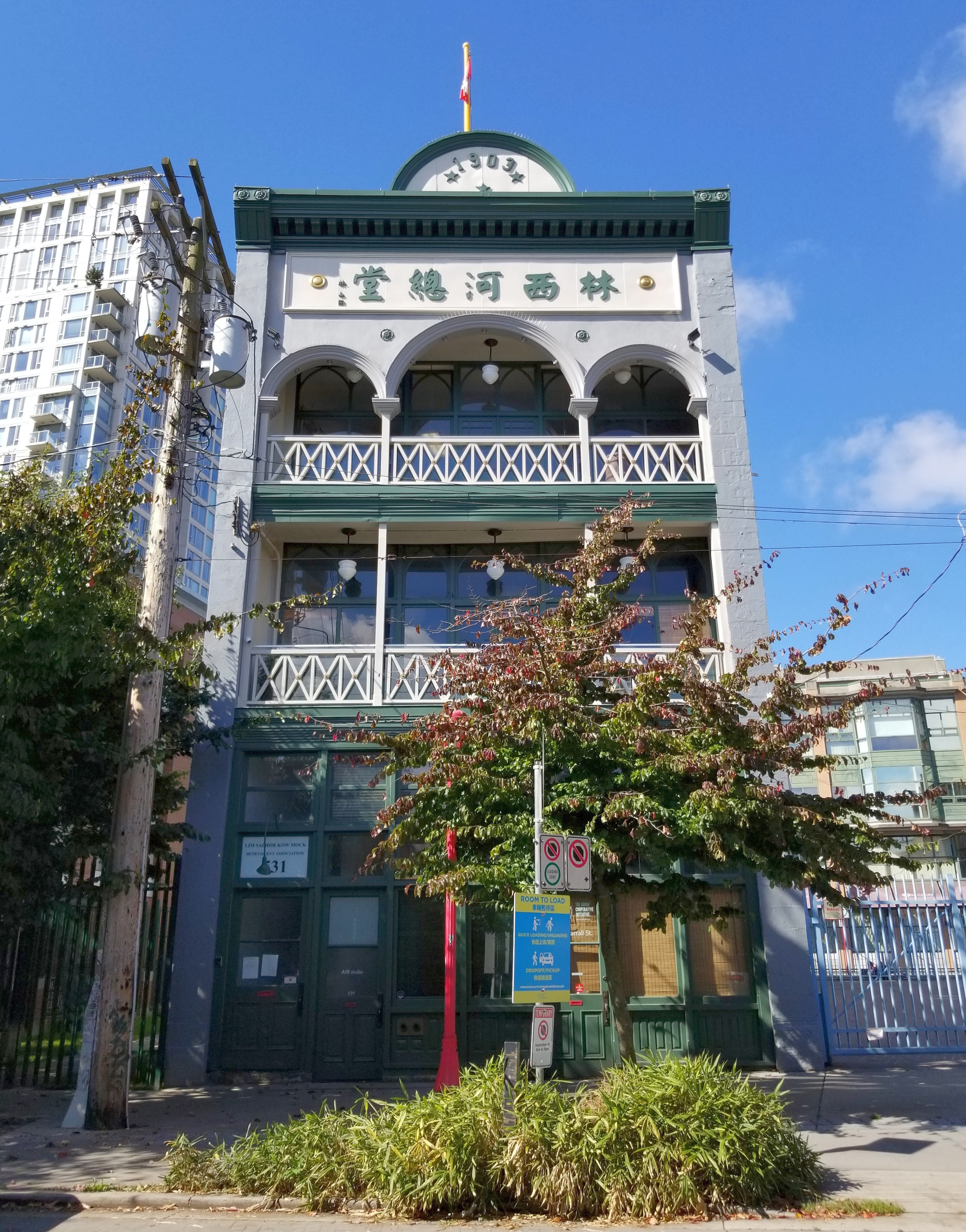
- The front facade in 2024
- Interactive map of the Lim Sai Hor Association Building area

General information
- Location: 525 Carrall Street, Vancouver, British Columbia, Canada
- Coordinates: 49°16′48.7″N 123°6′17.1″W
- Year built: 1903; 123 years ago

Technical details
- Floor count: 3

National Historic Site of Canada
- Official name: Lim Sai Hor Association Building
- Designated: January 14, 2003
- Reference no.: 2809

Chinese name
- Traditional Chinese: 林西河總堂九牧公所大樓
- Simplified Chinese: 林西河总堂九牧公所大楼
Transcriptions
Standard Mandarin
- Hanyu Pinyin: Lín Xī Hé Zǒng Táng Jiǔ Mù Gōngsuǒ Dàlóu
Yue: Cantonese
- Jyutping: Lam^{4} Sai^{1} Ho^{4} Zung^{2} Tong^{4} Gau^{2} Muk^{6} Gung^{1}so^{2} Daai^{6}lau^{4}
other Yue
- Taishanese: Lim^{5} Sai^{1} Ho^{2} Jung^{3} Tong^{2} Gau^{3} Muk^{6} Gong^{1}so^{3} Tai^{6}lau^{2}

The Lim Sai Hor Association Building (Chinese: 林西河總堂九牧公所大樓) is a historic building in the Chinatown of Vancouver, British Columbia, Canada. It is the headquarters of the eponymous Lim Sai Hor Kow Mock Benevolent Association and was an early hub for overseas Chinese hoping to reconnect with their families in China. The building was added to the Canadian Register of Historic Places on January 14, 2003.

== History ==
The Lim Sai Hor Association Building was built in 1903 and originally housed the Vancouver headquarters of the Chinese Empire Reform Association (CERA), an overseas Chinese monarchist organization. The CERA's main objective was to advocate the transformation of the Qing dynasty into a constitutional monarchy, but it was known in Chinatown primarily for its efforts to connect residents with their families and communities back in China. The CERA's influence persisted, but was weakened, following the overthrow of the Qing dynasty and the establishment of the Republic of China in 1912. Two years later, in 1914, the prolific Chinese Canadian architect W. H. Chow redesigned the building's Carrall Street frontage, giving it its present mix-influenced design.

The building was purchased and renovated by the Lim Sai Hor Kow Mock Benevolent Association, a clan association (or family association), in 1945–46. The choice of an evergreen repaint reflected the meaning of the surname Lim (from the Taishanese pronunciation of 林), which translates to "forest". The association's goal was to transform the building into a meeting place of not only the Lims of Chinatown, but of the wider local community.

On January 14, 2003, the building was listed number 2809 in the Canadian Register of Historic Places, in recognition of its early contributions to the Chinese-Canadian community in Vancouver.

== Usage ==
The Lim Sai Hor Association Building has seen mixed use since its inception, with the upper floors being used by the Lim Association and the ground floor being occupied by successive businesses. A Chinese-language library, a general meeting room, a bathhouse, a Canada-to-China money transfer service, and a number of residential suites all once existed inside the Lim Sai Hor Association Building. The headquarters of the Vancouver Artists Labour Union Co-Operative are currently housed in the ground floor of the building.
