= Chinese Canadian Museum =

Museum in Vancouver, British Columbia

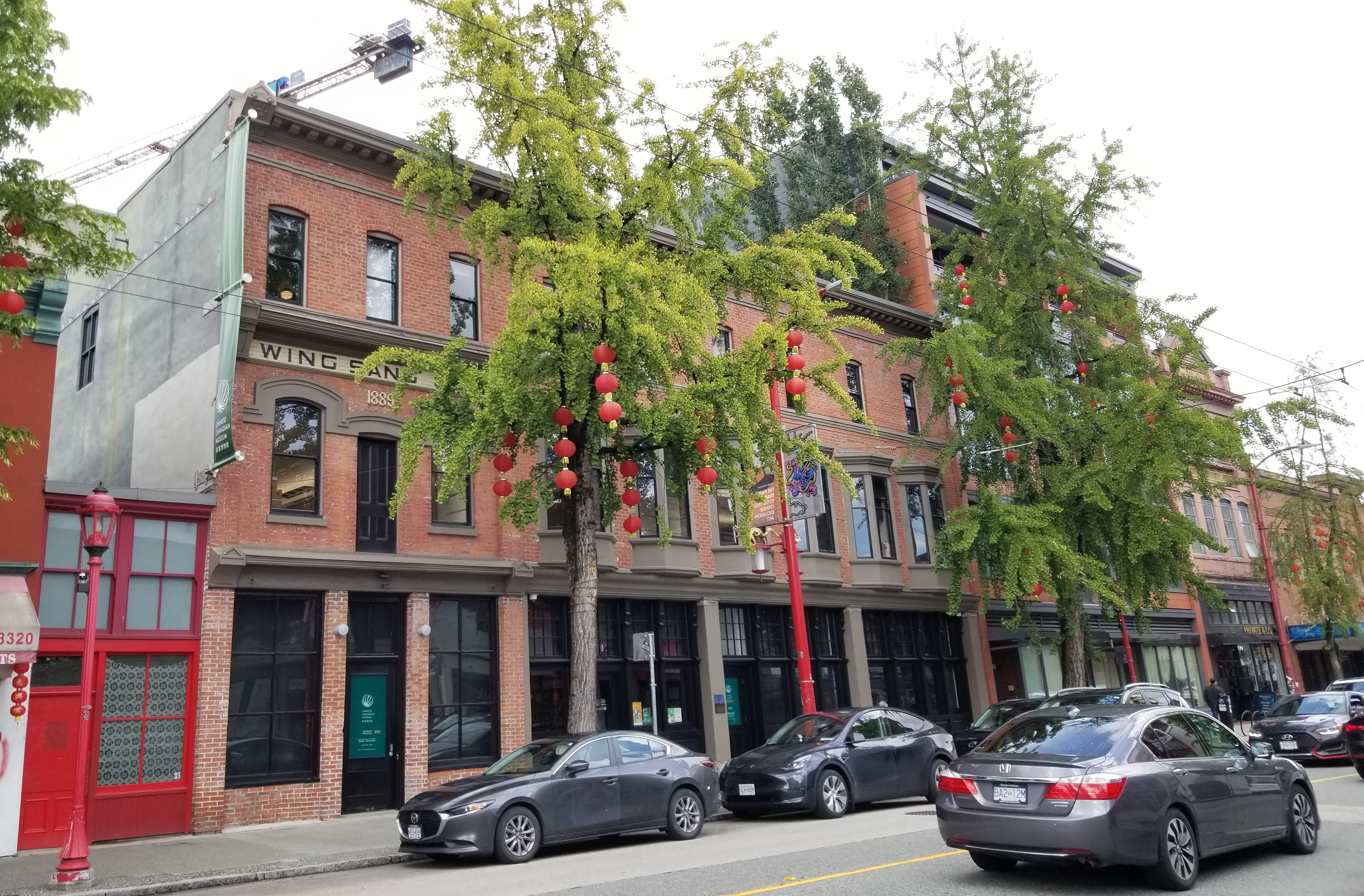
- The Chinese Canadian Museum at the Wing Sang Building
- Established: July 1, 2023; 3 years ago
- Location: 51 East Pender Street, Vancouver, British Columbia, Canada V6A 1S9
- Coordinates: 49°16′51″N 123°06′11″W
- CEO: Melissa Karmen Lee
- Curator: Olivia Chow
- Owner: Chinese Canadian Museum Society of British Columbia
- Public transit access: Stadium-Chinatown; 19 Stanley Park/Metrotown
- Website: chinesecanadianmuseum.ca

Chinese name
- Traditional Chinese: 華裔博物館
- Simplified Chinese: 华裔博物馆
Transcriptions
Standard Mandarin
- Hanyu Pinyin: huá yì bó wù guǎn
Yue: Cantonese
- Jyutping: waa^{4} jeoi^{6} bok^{3} mat^{6} gun^{2}

The Chinese Canadian Museum (Chinese: 華裔博物館) is a museum located in the historic Chinatown neighbourhood of Vancouver, British Columbia. Opened on July 1, 2023, it is the first museum in Canada dedicated entirely to the history, culture, and contributions of Chinese Canadians.

The museum is headquartered in the Wing Sang Building, the oldest brick building in Vancouver's Chinatown.

== History ==
The museum originated from a 2017 commitment by the Government of British Columbia to establish a cultural institution recognizing the Chinese diaspora. Following province-wide community consultations, the Chinese Canadian Museum Society of BC was founded in 2020 to develop and operate the institution.

The provincial government initially backed the initiative with a $10 million investment, followed by an additional $27.5 million in funding to secure and revitalize its permanent home. The museum officially opened its doors to the public on July 1, 2023, coinciding with the 100th anniversary of the passing of the 1923 Chinese Exclusion Act.

== Building and location ==
The museum is housed in the Wing Sang Building at 51 East Pender Street. Built in 1889 by Chinese merchant Yip Sang for his business, the Wing Sang Company, the building is a recognized national heritage site.

Over the late 19th and early 20th centuries, the facility expanded to include a six-story residential wing to accommodate Yip Sang's large family.

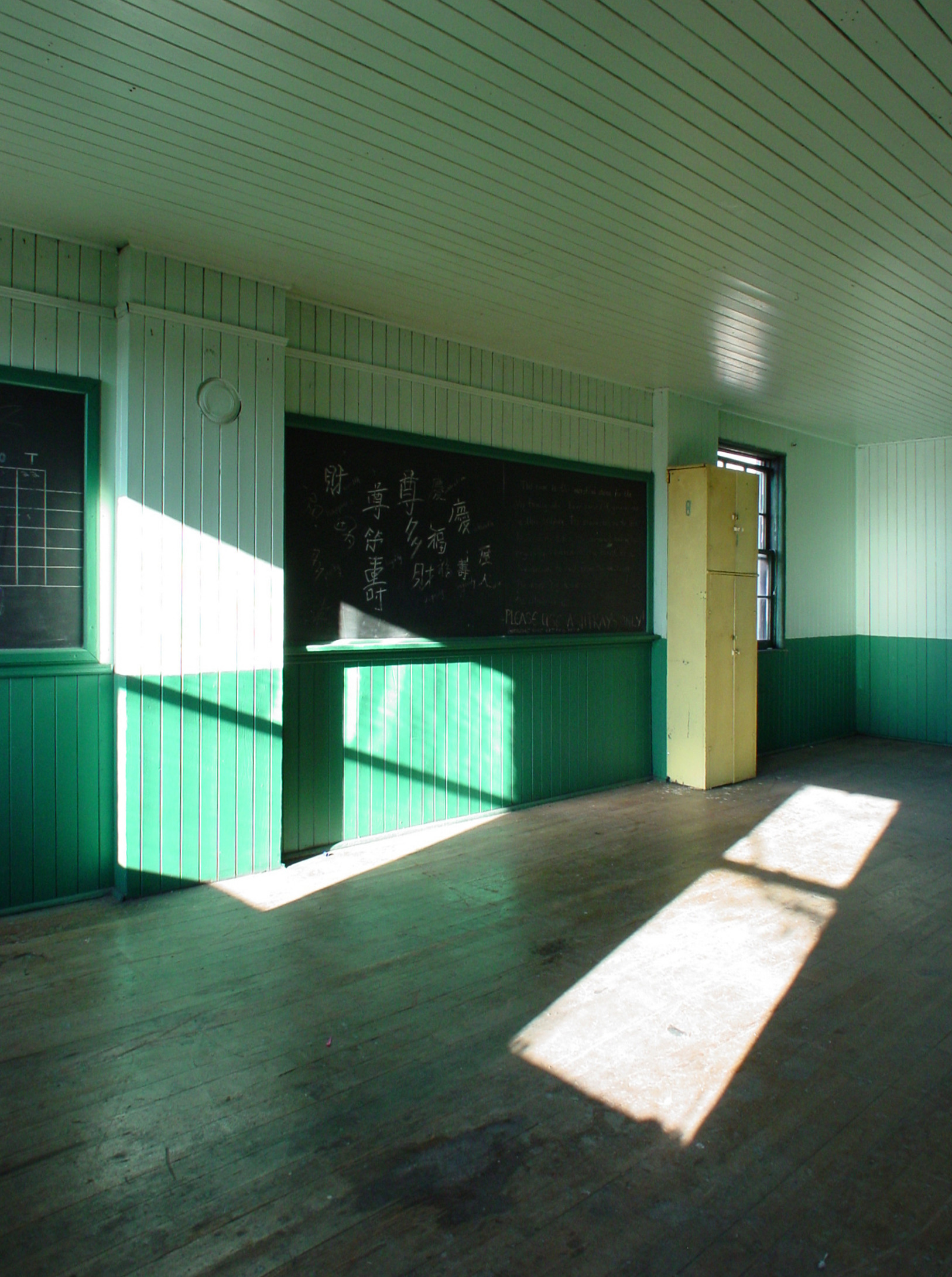
The School Room prior to restoration.

The building's preservation structure retains several original architectural and historical elements:

- A recreated 1930s living room: Located on the third floor, illustrating the daily life of Yip Sang's family during the exclusion era.
- The school room: Registered in 1914 as the Vancouver Chinese Independent School, it stands as one of the oldest preserved classrooms in the city.
- Bachelors' alley: A narrow covered breezeway inside the complex that historically sheltered early Chinese migrant workers who were separated from their families.
