= Wong Foon Sien =

Canadian journalist and civil rights activist (1899–1971)

- 黃寬先 / 黃文甫
- Born: Wong Mun Poo; 7 July 1899; Guangdong, China
- Died: 31 July 1971 (aged 72); Vancouver, British Columbia, Canada
- Education: University of British Columbia
- Occupation: Journalist
- Known for: Activism

Wong Foon Sien (Chinese: 黃寬先; 7 July 1899 – 31 July 1971), also simply known as Foon Sien, was a Canadian journalist and labour activist. He devoted time to a number of civil and human rights organizations, was one of the early leaders of the Chinese Benevolent Association in Vancouver, and was "perhaps the most influential person" in the city's Chinatown. He was sometimes referred to as the "spokesman for Chinatown", or as "mayor of Chinatown" by white Canadians, to the resentment of some Chinese Canadians in the community.

Foon Sien sought to end discrimination against Chinese Canadians and other minority groups, and was an ardent activist to grant or recognize their rights, particularly regarding immigration and family reunification.

== Early life ==
He was born Wong Mun Poo (Chinese: 黃文甫) on 7 July 1899 in Guangdong and moved to Cumberland, British Columbia in 1908 with his parents. His parents, who had become successful merchants, hoped he would build a career in Imperial China, and had wanted to send him to China for a proper education; he spent time after school reading Four Books and Five Classics when he was 10 years old. Their hopes were dashed when revolutionary Sun Yat-sen visited Cumberland from his exile in the United States on a fund-raising trip in 1911, leaving an impression on Foon Sien, who resolved to study law. After he completed high school, he moved to Vancouver and became one of five Chinese students to enroll at the University of British Columbia (UBC). He became the president of the Chinese Students' Alliance of Canada.

Foon Sien was also a member of the Chinese Canadian Club (Tong-yuen Wui), established in Victoria in 1914.

== Career ==
He graduated from UBC, and was hired as a court interpreter by Alexander Malcolm Manson, the Attorney General of British Columbia. He became embroiled in controversy over the Janet Smith case, as Manson, private detective Oscar Robinson, Forbes Cruickshank of the British Columbia Provincial Police, and police detectives Sam North and James Hannah kidnapped Foon Sing Wong, a suspect in the murder. The suspect was held for months, beaten, and questioned by the detectives with translation provided by Foon Sien. The English-language Vancouver press exposed him as an employee of the detective agency, which performed services for police agencies off the record. The kidnapping elicited outrage amongst both Chinese and English-speaking residents of Vancouver, and a group of unnamed "older Chinese merchants" filed an official complaint about Foon Sien's actions to the attorney general. Foon Sien's role was seen as a conflict of interest, as he was translating for the court and assisting the investigation.

He founded the Kwong Lee Tai Company, a Chinese legal brokerage that employed interpreters to handle a wide range of cases, including civil and criminal matters such as immigration, deportation, merchant certificates, contracts, and leases with Westerners. In 1942, he founded the Chinese Trade Workers' Association, one of several associations he would establish throughout his life.

The Chinese Benevolent Association, established in 1906, often consisted of Chinese merchants with the "financial and social influence" to conduct business outside Vancouver's Chinatown. In 1937, following suit with the Benevolent's Association earlier leaders Yip Sang and Won Alexander Cumyow, he was named publicity agent for the association's aid-to-China program during the Second Sino-Japanese War, as his activities had already established him as proficient in 'public relations' before the advent of World War II. In 1948, he became the organization's co-chairman, a position he held until 1959. During this time, the CBA achieved its peak from the influence of his connections outside Chinatown, claimed by one author to have connections to membership in the Liberal Party of Canada, and his "wide acquaintance with mainstream journalists and leaders of other minority groups".

He supported the Liberal Party of Canada throughout his life, but supported Progressive Conservative candidate Douglas Jung in the Canadian federal elections of 1957 and 1958. Jung became the first Chinese Canadian Member of Parliament.

== Journalism and activism ==
In 1944, he drafted and signed a petition with Gordon Won Cumyow, Esther Fung, Ann Chian, Joe Leong, Henry Lee, and Andrew Lam as members of the Chinese Canadian Association. It contained seven points requesting the right for Chinese Canadians to vote in elections in British Columbia, and was sent to the Government of British Columbia and the Government of Canada. In 1945, he was hired to the editorial staff of the New Republic Chinese Daily in Victoria. He also contributed to other publications, such as the Chinatown News.

In 1945, he began a campaign for Canadian governments to grant voting rights to Chinese Canadians. These were granted federally and provincially by 1947, and municipally by 1949. After the Chinese Immigration Act was repealed in 1947, he became an important figure for the elimination of the remaining immigration restrictions in Canada, particularly regarding the separation of Chinese Canadian families as a result of those restrictions, and to seek redress for the head tax. He travelled to Ottawa annually from 1949 to 1959 to meet and lobby politicians, earning him fame. He appeared often in mainstream media coverage about the subject, and the Chinese Canadian media covered his trips exhaustively, even including itineraries and "editorial support". This led to Foon Sien being regarded as a spokesman for the Chinese community, and increased his influence and that of the CBA. In 1953, the CBA distributed a leaflet to endorse candidates for the federal election.

What we ask is not an open door to all Chinese who wish to come. Our appeal is that the Chinese Canadian may have his family with him – a complete family, not one part in Canada and the other part in Hong Kong or China.

— Foon Sien, quoted posthumously by Mark Bourrie, originally from Chinatown News (1956 May 3)

His lobbying for the liberalization of Canadian immigration law eventually "enabled hundreds of families of Chinese origin to reunite", as Chinese Canadians could sponsor husbands, wives, unmarried offspring, and elderly parents. The Chinese Canadian Citizens Association presented him an award for his activities.

Despite this, Foon Sien was viewed as a controversial figure by some in the Chinese community, who believed he was "manipulating the CBA for his personal aggrandizement", or resented him being referred to as "mayor of Chinatown" by the mainstream media, though such criticism was not widespread. In 1959, he resigned from the CBA committee.

In 1959, the Royal Canadian Mounted Police and Canadian Immigration Department began an investigation into an alleged racketeering operation by Chinese Canadians to illegally bring Chinese immigrants to Canada. The RCMP conducted raids of residences, businesses, and organizations of leaders of Chinese Canadian communities, seizing passports, visas, and other documents. More than 30,000 were seized in Vancouver, many of which were translated by officers from the Hong Kong Police Force, acting as undercover agents. Foon Sien considered these raids to be part of systemic human rights violations: "The situation resembles a country under martial law. If the government does not restrict such actions, the basic rights and freedoms of the people are endangered." Chinese community associations conducted media counter-campaigns; ultimately, few people were convicted for such immigration schemes. The CBA suffered damage as a result of these raids, as it had been implicated in the racketeering scheme by the police, and its prestige and influence waned as a result.

In the 1960s, he was an activist against certain developments in Vancouver, particularly those affecting Chinatown. In 1963, he resigned from a consultative committee established by Mayor William Rathie to emphasize his strong opposition to the Strathcona Rehabilitation Project. He believed that the project would create a barrier, likened to "the equivalent of a Berlin wall," separating the business and residential areas of Chinatown. It would raze 30 acres for a high-rise building at MacLean Park and the Raymur-Campbell public housing project, some of which was land expropriated from Chinese property owners. Rathie suggested the group represented by the Chinese Benevolent Association to submit its own plans for the development, which was favourably received by the community. However, Vancouver City Council approved the developers plans the subsequent week, but also stated they'd accept input from architects consulting for the CBA.

Foon Sien died in Vancouver on 31 July 1971, and his funeral was one of the most attended in Chinatown.

== Legacy ==
On 26 August 2008 he was registered in the Persons of National Historic Significance, a register of people designated by the Government of Canada as being nationally significant in the history of the country. Many of his papers, as well as newspaper clippings and other works, are archived in the Special Collections division of the University of British Columbia Library.

John Atkin listed Foon Sien as one of the Top 10 Vancouverites in an April 2011 column for the Vancouver Sun.

== See also ==
- Chinese Canadians in British Columbia
- History of Chinese immigration to Canada
