= Fortune Sound Club =

Nightclub in Vancouver, Canada

- Interactive map of Fortune Sound Club
- Former names: Royal Unicorn Cabaret
- Address: 147 E Pender St, Vancouver, Canada
- Coordinates: 49.28061°N 123.10081°W
- Owner: Blueprint Events, Garret ‘GMan’ Louie & Rob Rizk (founders)
- Type: Bar / Nightclub
- Events: Hip-Hop, R&B, Electronic music, Top 40, Underground music, Experimental music, Rock music, Various

Construction
- Opened: 2009

Website
- Official website

Fortune Sound Club is a nightclub in Chinatown, Vancouver, Canada, established in 2009.

== Origins ==
Fortune Sound Club is located in a three-story building constructed in 1921.

Fortune originated as a nightclub with a very niche-oriented demographic. What was once considered the ‘hipster’ nightclub of Vancouver, Fortune hosts multiple cultural nights each week, and supports events catered towards the alt-underground community and the local scene. Fortune Sound is known for not only club nights & concerts but unique community gatherings such as art shows, pop up shops, food fairs, mental health seminars & much more. Previously, its building served as the location of the famous Ming's Restaurant before closure.
