= Randall Wong =

Canadian lawyer

- Born: Vancouver, British Columbia, Canada
- Other name: Buddy Wong
- Occupation: judge
- Known for: Canada's first Chinese-Canadian federal judge; Longest serving judge on British Columbia's Supreme Court

Randall Wong is a Canadian lawyer. He was the first Chinese-Canadian lawyer to be appointed to a federal court. He is the longest serving judge on British Columbia's Supreme Court.

On August 3, 2011, over a thousand members of the extended Wong family gathered in Toronto to celebrate the Canadian Heraldic Authority granting of a Wong family crest. Press coverage of this event listed Randall Wong as one of the most distinguished members of the family.

Wong's parents owned the historic Ovaltine Cafe, and he attributes conversations he had while working there, with law enforcement officials. with his decision to make the law his career.
