= Hua Foundation =

Canadian non-profit organization

The Hua Foundation is a non-profit organization based in Vancouver, British Columbia, Canada, founded in fall of 2013, and launched in November 2013. It was founded by youth organizers Claudia Li (Chinese-born Canadian), Kevin Huang (Taiwanese-Canadian) and Bard Suen (Chinese-born Canadian) to build community engagement in environmentalism and sustainability.

The foundation evolved out of Li and Huang's shark conservation campaign, Shark Truth. It is a program of the Global Youth Education Network Society (genius), a federally registered charity.

== Programs ==
=== Reconnecting ===
In 2013, The foundation hosted a wonton workshop, the first of a series of cooking classes called the "G-Ma Kitchen Table Series." The classes aim to reconnect Chinese youth with their traditional foods and practices by decreasing the intergenerational knowledge gap.

=== The Choi Project ===
The Choi Project is the Hua Foundation's food security and food literacy program. It aims to provide more local, pesticide, and hormone-free food products that can be used in traditional cuisine. The organization is partnered with various Metro Vancouver area groups such as the Richmond Food Security Society, Vancouver Food Policy Council and urban growers.

=== Shark Truth ===
In 2009, Claudia Li founded Shark Truth, an organization aiming to protect sharks from extinction through reduction of shark finning, using cross-cultural messaging, such as its Happy Hearts Love Sharks wedding contest. In 2012, Shark Truth offered wedding couples who vowed to go "Fin Free" at their weddings a chance to win a trip to the Galapagos Islands. Shark Truth campaigns saved nearly 8,000 sharks by diverting over 80,000 bowls of shark fin from consumption.

The issue of shark-fin soup caused controversy and divides in the Chinese and environmental communities. The move toward local bans in Canadian municipalities — and Shark Truth's role — was covered in the South China Morning Post and numerous national and international outlets.
