= Mary Lee Chan =

Canadian civic activist

Mary Lee Chan (Lee Wo Soon) (1915–2002) was a civic activist in Vancouver, British Columbia, Canada, who is noted for leading the opposition to the bulldozing of the Strathcona neighbourhood in the late 1960s. With her husband, Walter, and her daughter, Shirley, she helped establish the Strathcona Property Owner and Tenants Association (SPOTA), going door to door to canvass opposition to the freeway plans. The Chan and Lee families were acknowledged as key SPOTA activists by the Chinese Canadian Historical Society of BC at the 2017 celebration dinner. All that was built was the Georgia Viaduct and the McLean Park housing project. She has been profiled at the Vancouver Museum and in the book, Celebration: Chinese Canadian Legacies in British Columbia (2017).

In part due to her activism, her home at 658 Keefer Street, has been recognized as a National Historic Place (1994). It is noted as an excellent example of Edwardian design, "typical of working-class housing constructed during the period." The Walter and Mary Lee Chan House is also listed in Places that Matter (Vancouver Heritage Foundation). As noted by Mary's son, Larry, "The Chan House became the focal point for many meetings amongst the community leaders. It was here that the planning for full community mobilization occurred, as strategies were made and for lobbying, door to door campaigning, newspaper articles written and information and ideas shared and discussed." In 2017 Vancouver Public Library's newly opened nə́c̓aʔmat ct Strathcona Branch dedicated its largest meeting room to Chan as the Wo Soon (Mary) Lee Chan Room.

== Family ==
Her mother immigrated from China in 1879 to Vancouver, a town which was then very new and only 20 years occupied by non-natives.

Her daughter Shirley Chan participated in SPOTA organizing as a university student. She has since become an established figure in the Chinese-Canadian community. She ran as a Liberal Party of Canada candidate in the 2004 federal election against the incumbent Member of Parliament, New Democratic Party Libby Davies.

Her son, Larry, lives in the Chan family home with his partner, Suelina Quan, and two daughters. The house is notable for its pink colour, "a similar colour that Mary and Walter had chosen years ago."
