= List of Chinese Canadians =

This is a list of Chinese Canadians including both original immigrants who obtained Canadian citizenship and their Canadian-born descendants who are notable, have made significant contributions to the Canadian or international culture or society politically, artistically or scientifically, or have prominently appeared in the news.

== Politics and public service ==
- Arnold Chan (陳家諾), late MP for Scarborough—Agincourt, Liberal
- Michael Chan (陳國治), current Markham Regional Councillor and former Ontario Cabinet Minister, MPP for Markham—Unionville, Liberal
- Raymond Chan (陳卓愉), former federal Minister of State, former MP for Richmond, Liberal
- Katrina Chen (陳葦蓁), MLA for Burnaby-Lougheed, BC NDP
- Shaun Chen (陳聖源), former chairman of the Toronto District School Board, Canada's largest school board, elected to the House of Commons of Canada in 2015 representing Scarborough North
- Kenny Chiu (趙錦榮), former MP for Steveston-Richmond East, Conservative
- Gordon Chong (張金儀), late former city councillor and former vice-chairman of the Toronto Transit Commission
- Ida Chong (張杏芳), BC Cabinet Minister, former MLA for Oak Bay-Gordon Head, BC Liberal
- Michael Chong (莊文浩), former federal Cabinet Minister, MP for Wellington—Halton Hills, Conservative
- George Chow (周烱華), two-term Vancouver City Councillor who was elected as a member of the Vision Vancouver party in 2005 and 2008
- Olivia Chow (鄒至蕙), Mayor of Toronto, former MP for Trinity—Spadina from 2006 to 2014, New Democrat Professor at Ryerson University
- Adrienne Clarkson (伍冰枝), Governor General of Canada from 1999 to 2005, former journalist, novelist, publisher, winner of the Gemini Award: Best Host in a Light Information Programme
- Han Dong (董晗鵬), MP for Don Valley North, Independent (formerly Liberal)
- Lillian Dyck, Canadian senator
- Ying Hope (劉光英), late former Metro Toronto Councillor
- Ted Hsu (徐正陶), MP and current MPP for Kingston and the Islands, Liberal
- Nathan Ip, MLA for Edmonton-South West, Alberta NDP. Former vice-chair and trustee of the Edmonton Public School Board
- Kerry Jang (鄭文宇), politician, currently serving on Vancouver, British Columbia's City Council
- Douglas Jung (鄭天華), first Canadian of Chinese origin elected to Parliament, former MP for Vancouver Centre, Conservative
- Vincent Ke (柯文彬), Ontario MPP for Don Valley North, Independent (formerly Progressive Conservative (PC))
- Jenny Kwan (關慧貞), BC Cabinet Minister, MLA for Vancouver-Mount Pleasant and MP for Vancouver East, New Democrat
- Norman Kwong (林佐民), former lieutenant governor of Alberta, star football player in CFL
- Cynthia Lai (封賴桂霞), late former Toronto city councillor for the Scarborough North electoral district
- David Lam (林思齊), late former BC Lieutenant Governor (1988–1995)
- Art Lee, former MP for Vancouver East and Parliamentary Secretary, former leader of British Columbia Liberal Party, Liberal
- Philip S. Lee (李紹麟) Lieutenant Governor of Manitoba (2009–2015)
- Richard Lee (李燦明), former British Columbia Liberal Party MLA for Burnaby North, BC Liberal
- Chungsen Leung (梁中心), former MP for Willowdale and Parliamentary Secretary for Multiculturalism, Conservative
- Sophia Leung (梁陳明任), former MP for Vancouver Kingsway and Parliamentary Secretary, Liberal
- Laurin Liu (劉舒雲), former MP for Rivière-des-Mille-Îles, New Democrat
- Raymond Louie (雷建华), Vancouver city councillor, former school trustee
- Alan Lowe (劉志強), former mayor of Victoria, BC
- Jason Luan (栾晋生), former AB MLA for Calgary-Hawkwood, Progressive Conservative (PC)
- Jean Lumb (林黃彩珍), late community activist and first Chinese-Canadian to receive the Order of Canada
- Gary Mar (馬健威), former Albertan Cabinet Minister and MLA for Calgary-Mackay, Conservative
- Inky Mark (麥鼎鴻), MP for Dauphin—Swan River, Conservative
- Denzil Minnan-Wong (黃旻南), first Chinese Deputy Mayor, Toronto
- Mary Ng (伍鳳儀), federal Minister of Small Business and Export Promotion and MP for Markham—Thornhill, Liberal
- Victor Oh (胡子修), Canadian senator from Ontario, born in Singapore but of Chinese descent, Conservative
- Billy Pang (彭錦威), Ontario MPP for Markham—Unionville, Progressive Conservative (PC)
- Vivienne Poy (利德蕙), first senator of Chinese ancestry, sister-in-law to Adrienne Clarkson, Liberal
- Ken Sim (沈觀健), mayor of Vancouver
- Mary-Woo Sims (沈明麗), politician and social justice activist; best known as a former chief commissioner of the British Columbia Human Rights Commission
- Mark Sutcliffe, mayor of Ottawa
- Geng Tan (譚耕), former MP for Don Valley North, Liberal
- Tony Tang, engineer and former Vancouver city Councilor
- Daisy Wai, Ontario MPP for Richmond Hill
- Peter Wing (吳榮添), first mayor of Chinese descent in North America, three successive terms as mayor of Kamloops starting in 1966
- Alice Wong (黃陳小萍), MP for Richmond Centre and former Minister of State for Seniors, Conservative
- Bob Wong (黃景培), former Ontario Cabinet Minister and MPP for Fort York, Liberal
- Patrick Wong (黃耀華), former BC MLA for Vancouver-Kensington, BC Liberal
- Peter Wong, former mayor of Sudbury, Ontario
- Soo Wong (黃素梅), Ontario MPP for Scarborough—Agincourt, Liberal
- Tony C. Wong (黃志華), former Ontario MPP for Markham, former York Region Councilor, Liberal
- Kristyn Wong-Tam (黃慧文), LGBTQ activist and Toronto councillor for the Rosedale electoral district
- Teresa Woo-Paw (鮑胡嫈儀), former Albertan MLA for Calgary-Mackay, Conservative
- David Xiao (蕭輝), Albertan MLA for Edmonton-McClung, Conservative
- John Yap (葉志明), BC MLA for Richmond-Steveston, BC Liberal
- Jean Yip (葉嘉麗), MP for Scarborough—Agincourt, Liberal
- Wai Young (楊蕭慧儀), former MP for Vancouver South, Conservative

== Law and judiciary ==
- Jim Chu (朱小荪), first Chinese Chief Constable of the Vancouver Police Service
- Susan Eng (伍素屏), former chair of the Metro Toronto Police Services Board
- Avvy Go (吳瑤瑤), prominent social justice lawyer and member of the Order of Ontario
- Guo Guoting (郭国汀), prominent lawyer who defended dissidents and Falun Gong practitioners
- Linda Ann Loo, Judge of the Supreme Court of British Columbia
- Won Alexander Cumyow (溫金有), first person of Chinese origin born in Canada; as a court interpreter, was also the first ethnic-Chinese government official in Canada
- Kew Dock Yip (葉求鐸), first Chinese-Canadian lawyer
- Peter Yuen (源植勉), first Chinese-Canadian Deputy Chief of the Toronto Police Service

== Military ==
At the start of World War II Chinese Canadians could not serve in the Royal Canadian Navy or RCAF as they were deemed aliens but could serve in the Canadian Army.

- Douglas Jung, later as federal MP
- William Lore, RCN Lieutenant Commander, later lawyer and insurance agent in Hong Kong

== Business ==
- Caleb Chan, businessman; son of the late Chan Sun; donated $10 million to fund UBC's Chan Centre for the Performing Arts
- Tom Chan, Vancouver based real estate entrepreneur; brother of Caleb Chan and son of the late Chan Shun; donated $10 million to fund UBC's Chan Centre for the Performing Arts
- G. Raymond Chang, co-founder and former CEO of CI Financial, philanthropist and third Chancellor of Ryerson University, whose Chang School of Continuing Education is named after him
- Ben Chiu (邱澤堃), founder of KillerApp.com
- Danielle Fong, co-founder and Chief Scientist of LightSail Energy, Inc.
- Thomas Fung, Hong Kong-born Canadian businessman and philanthropist; eldest son of Fung King Hey; founder of the Fairchild Group
- Fung King Hey, one of the founders of Sun Hung Kai & Co; father of Thomas Fung
- David Ho, Vancouver-based entrepreneur originally from Hong Kong; founder of Harmony Airways; owner of the University Golf Club and MCL motors
- Gary Ho, businessman, philanthropist, and official of the Tzu Chi Buddhist philanthropic foundation
- Lawrence Ho (何猷龍), Canadian and Hong Kong founder of Melco Resorts & Entertainment
- Andrea Jung (鍾彬嫻), CEO of Avon Products
- Li Ka-shing, Chairman of Hutchison Whampoa Limited and Cheung Kong Holdings; investor in Husky Oil
- Eva Kwok, businesswoman and former director of the Bank of Montreal
- Chu Lai, businessman, one of the earliest Chinese-Canadian merchants in British Columbia
- Cindy Lee, businesswoman; founder, President, and former CEO of T & T Supermarket
- Paul Lee, former president of Electronic Arts
- Robert H. Lee, Vancouver based businessman; chairman and founder of Prospero; Robert H. Lee Graduate School is named in honor of his philanthropy
- Tina Lee, (李佩婷), CEO of T & T Supermarket
- Michael Lee-Chin, investor; CEO of AIC Canada
- Richard Li, businessman; son of Hong Kong business mogul Li Ka-shing; Chairman of PCCW and chairman of PCCW's executive committee
- Victor Li, businessman; son of Hong Kong business mogul, Li Ka-shing and major investor in Air Canada
- Brandt C. Louie, President and CEO of H.Y. Louie Co. Limited; Chairman of London Drugs Limited
- Yip Sang, businessman
- Alfred Sung, fashion designer and founder of Club Monaco
- Brian Wong, co-founder of Kiip
- Milton Wong, financier and former chairman of HSBC Canada
- Gabriel Yiu, businessman, journalist, and social activist
- Changpeng Zhao, founder and CEO of Binance, he is the richest Canadian as of March 2024

== Athletics ==
- Avianna Chao (趙航), sport shooter in the Olympic Games
- Chris Beckford-Tseu, ice hockey goaltender for the St. Louis Blues
- Chun Hon Chan, Olympic weight lifter
- Patrick Chan (陳偉群), figure skater; 2011 World Champion, four-time Canadian Champion and Olympic medalist
- Bryan Chiu, Chinese-Canadian football player for the Montreal Alouettes
- Zach Edey, consensus player of the year in NCAA Division I men's basketball in 2023 and 2024 (Chinese–Canadian mother)
- Adderly Fong (方駿宇), race car driver
- Lori Fung (馮黎明), gymnast and winner of the first gold medal ever in Rhythmic Gymnastics at 1984 Olympic Games
- Chan Hon Goh (吳振紅), first Chinese-Canadian principal dancer with the National Ballet of Canada
- Andre Ho, table tennis player
- Joshua Ho-Sang, ice hockey player
- Jason Ho-Shue, badminton player and national champion in Men's singles
- Carol Huynh (黃嘉露), Olympic gold medalist in wrestling in the 2008 Summer Games in Beijing
- Samantha Jo (aka Sam Tjhia), martial arts, Olympian, actress
- Larry Kwong, (吳啟光), first non-white and first Chinese-Canadian to play in the National Hockey League. Broke hockey's colour barrier
- Norman Kwong (林佐民), known as "The China Clipper", fullback, won four Grey Cups and 30 individual Canadian Football League records; also served as former lieutenant governor of Alberta
- Mira Leung (梁美諾), figure skater
- Michelle Li (李文珊), badminton player and 2014 Commonwealth Games Champion
- Landon Ling (林家亮), soccer player
- Alexa Loo (盧仙泳), Olympic snowboarder
- Jujie Luan (栾菊杰), fencer
- Maggie Mac Neil, Olympic gold medal swimmer, 2021 Olympics in Tokyo
- Darryl O'Young (歐陽若曦), racing driver
- Jayde Riviere, Soccer player, 2020 Olympic gold medal with Canada national team.
- Wendy Saschenbrecker, fencer
- Emilio Estevez Tsai (蔡立靖), soccer player
- Eugene Wang (王臻), Olympic table tennis
- Megan Wing, figure skate
- Charlene Wong, former Olympic figure skater
- Lester Wong, Olympic fencer
- Brandon Yip (葉勁光), ice hockey player for the Phoenix Coyotes
- Zhang Mo (張墨), Olympic table tennis
- Carol Zhao (赵一羽), tennis player

== Visual arts ==
- Raymond Chow, martial arts film producer
- Richard Fung, video artist, writer, public intellectual and theorist
- Terence Koh, diverse work sometimes involving queer, punk, and pornographic sensibilities
- Ken Lum, public art champion, award-winning educator
- Bruce Mau, design, architecture, art, museums, film, eco-environmental design, and conceptual philosophy
- Fiona Staples, multi-award winning comic book artist
- Paul Wong, award-winning artist, curator, and organizer of public interventions
- Tobi Wong, artist
- Xiaojing Yan (闫晓静), sculptor, installation artist
- Matthew Wong (王俊傑), painter

== Entertainment ==
- Allison Au, Chinese-Jewish Canadian jazz saxophonist
- Aarif Rahman (李治廷), Hong Kong born Chinese Canadian singer/actor
- Aimee Chan (陳茵媺), Canadian actress based in Hong Kong
- Albert M. Chan, actor and filmmaker
- Yung Chang, film director
- Peter Chao, Youtube personality
- Joyce Cheng (鄭欣宜), Hong Kong based Canadian singer/actress
- Ken Chinn, punk rock
- Ping Chong (張家平), contemporary theater director
- Mark Chao (趙又廷), Taiwanese-Canadian actor, model
- Caleb Chan, Canadian composer
- Shannon Chan-Kent, Canadian voice actress, singer and actress
- Angela Chang (張韶涵), Taiwanese singer and actress
- Desiree Lim, filmmaker
- Osric Chau, Canadian actor
- Edison Chen (陳冠希), Hong Kong Canadian film actor, musician, producer, entrepreneur, and fashion designer
- Terry Chen, Canadian film and television actor
- Fred Cheng (鄭俊弘), Canadian-born Hong Kong actor and singer
- Olivia Cheng (鄭啟蕙), Canadian actress, broadcast journalist, and former correspondent for Entertainment Tonight Canada
- Kayi Cheung, Miss Hong Kong 2007
- Leslie Cheung (張國榮), Hong Kong singer, actor and film producer, Cantopop pioneer
- Charlene Choi (蔡卓妍), Hong Kong actress and singer, Cantopop group Twins
- Rae Dawn Chong, Canadian-American actress
- Robbi Chong, Canadian actress and former model
- Tommy Chong, Canadian-American comedian, actor, writer, director, activist, and musician, part of comedy duo Cheech & Chong
- Nikki Chooi, Chinese-Canadian classical violinist
- Timothy Chooi, Chinese-Canadian violinist and professor
- Lawrence Chou (周俊偉), Hong Kong-based Canadian singer and actor
- Jacky Chu, Taiwanese actor; former member of Taiwanese group 183 Club
- Christy Chung (鍾麗緹), Canadian actress and restaurateur
- Linda Chung (鍾嘉欣), Chinese-Canadian actress and singer
- Shawn Dou (窦骁), Chinese-Canadian actor
- Liu Fang, musician, plays pipa (Chinese lute)
- Evan Fong, Canadian video game commentator
- Fiona Fu, actress
- Patrick Gallagher, Canadian actor
- Godfrey Gao (高以翔), Taiwanese-Canadian actor, brand model
- Chan-hon Goh, ballet dancer, past principal dancer with the National Ballet of Canada
- Anna Guo, musician, plays yangqin (Chinese hammered dulcimer)
- Han Mei, musician and scholar of ethnomusicology, plays guzheng (Chinese plucked zither) and liuqin (Chinese lute)
- He Qiuxia, musician, plays pipa (Chinese lute)
- Xiaodan He, filmmaker
- Anne Heung (向海嵐), Hong Kong Canadian actress and model
- Denise Ho (何韻詩), Hong Kong-based Cantopop singer and social activist
- Sandrine Holt, English-Canadian model and actress
- Samantha Jo, Canadian actress
- Matthew Ko (高鈞賢), Hong Kong actor, 2005 Mr. Hong Kong
- Kristin Kreuk, Canadian actress
- Krew, a Canadian YouTube gaming group, consists of Kat La (Funneh), Betty La (Rainbow), Kim La (Gold), Wenny La (Lunar), and Allen La (Draco), all of whom are siblings
- Grace Lynn Kung, Canadian actress
- Jade Kwan (關心妍), Hong Kong Cantopop singer
- Julia Kwan, Vancouver-based filmmaker, resident at Canadian Film Centre
- Kelvin Kwan (關楚耀), Cantopop singer
- Miranda Kwok, screenwriter, actress, and film producer
- Sonija Kwok (郭羨妮), Hong Kong actress, currently works for TVB, 1999 Miss Hong Kong
- Patrick Kwok-Choon, Canadian actor
- Karena Lam (林嘉欣), Taiwanese actress and singer based in Hong Kong
- Henry Lau, singer-songwriter, producer, and actor working in Korean pop music; member of Super Junior-M
- Callina Liang, Chinese-Canadian actress
- Byron Lawson, Canadian actor
- Cory Lee, Canadian singer-songwriter and actress
- Lee Kum-Sing, pianist
- Quentin Lee (李孟熙) – Canadian / American director, known for gay Asian stories
- Sook-Yin Lee, Canadian broadcaster, musician, filmmaker, and actress; host of CBC Radio's Definitely Not the Opera
- Selena Li(李施嬅), Hong Kong-based Canadian actress
- Shin Lim (林良尋), America's Got Talent (season 13) winner 2018 (America).
- Anastasia Lin (林耶凡), actress, Miss World Canada 2015, human rights activist, denied opportunity to enter Miss World due to activism
- Bernice Liu (廖碧兒), Canadian actress, singer, and commercial model based in Hong Kong
- Simu Liu, Canadian actor, writer and stuntman
- Ellen Joyce Loo (盧凱彤), singer, Cantopop group at17
- Alexina Louie, Canadian composer
- Crystal Lowe, Canadian actress and model, best known for her scream queen roles
- Yvette Lu, Canadian independent film and stage actress, filmmaker, singer, composer, writer and producer
- Linlyn Lue, Canadian actress
- David Y.H. Lui, Vancouver arts impresario and producer
- Frieda Luk, film director and screenwriter
- Nicole Lyn, actress known for her role in TV series Student Bodies
- Kenneth Ma (馬國明), Canadian actor working in Hong Kong
- Melissa O'Neil, Canadian singer and musical theatre actress
- Daniel Ong, actor and radio-TV personality in Singapore
- Eddie Peng (彭于晏), also known as Peng Yu-yen), a Taiwanese Canadian actor
- Keanu Reeves, Canadian movie actor
- Steph Song, actress
- Domee Shi, animator/writer/director, Academy Award winner
- Lydia Shum (沈殿霞), Hong Kong and Canadian comedian and actor
- Mina Shum, Canadian independent film director
- Hayden Szeto, Canadian actor
- Meg Tilly, actress and novelist
- Angela Tong (湯盈盈), Hong Kong based Canadian actress
- Nicholas Tse (謝霆鋒), Hong Kong based Canadian actor, martial artist, TV chef, entertainer
- Yee Jee Tso, Canadian actor
- Cissy Wang (汪詩詩), fashion model, wife of Donnie Yen
- Jeremy Wang, better known as Disguised Toast, YouTube personality
- Byron Wong, music and TV producer; founder of several entertainment and new media production and design companies
- Ellen Wong, Canadian actress of Cambodian and Chinese descent
- Jadyn Wong, Canadian actress
- Kris Wu (吴亦凡), also known as Wu Yifan, Canadian rapper and former member of band EXO
- Stephen Yan, celebrity chef
- Benny Yau, Canadian television presenter, actor, and singer
- Sally Yeh (葉蒨文), Taiwanese-Canadian Cantopop singer and actress
- Françoise Yip (葉芳華), Canadian actress
- Raugi Yu, actor
- Catalina Yue, singer, songwriter, actress
- Tony Yu (余景天), Chinese-Canadian singer, dancer, former Youth With You (season 3) and Produce X 101 contestant
- Rui Shi Zhuo (卓汭仕), Canadian composer
- Song Yiren (宋伊人), Chinese-Canadian actress.
- Xuan Liu (刘璇), Chinese-Canadian top 20 female poker player

== Media ==
- Andrew Chang, journalist and news anchor for CBC Television
- Wei Chen, journalist for Canadian radio and TV
- Cindy Cheung, TV presenter, most recently with Fairchild Television
- Sharlene Chiu, television reporter, host, and producer most known for MTV News Canada
- Mellissa Fung, journalist for CBC news
- Jiang Weiping, journalist, emigrated to Canada after release from prison in China
- Bernard Lo, news anchor and show host for financial TV shows, based in Hong Kong
- Elaine Lui, television reporter, entertainer, "gossip maven" for CTV Television Network
- Sheng Xue (also known as Reimonna Sheng), Canadian Chinese journalist, writer, activist for civil rights in China
- Ziya Tong, Canadian television personality and producer, news and science shows
- Jan Wong (黃明珍), journalist for several Canadian newspapers, known for Lunch With... column

== Literature ==
- Chan Koonchung (陈冠中), science fiction novelist
- Cheng Sait Chia, poet
- Denise Chong (鄭霭玲), author of books on history, former economic adviser to the government, author of widely anthologized speech "Being Canadian"
- Kevin Chong, novelist, author of non-fiction, and freelance journalist
- Wayson Choy (崔維新), novelist and memoirist, teaches writing at Humber College
- Jim Wong-Chu, poet, author, historian, activist
- Judy Fong Bates, fiction writer
- Evelyn Lau (劉綺芬), poet, novelist, essayist, novelist
- Vincent Lam, non-fiction and fiction writer and practicing physician, winner of 2006 Scotiabank Giller Prize
- Larissa Lai, poet and novelist
- Sky Lee, feminist, lesbian writer of fiction and non-fiction
- Margaret Lim, author of children's books set in Malaysia
- Andy Quan, gay Canadian novelist who explores interaction sexual and cultural identity, now living in Australia
- Goh Poh Seng, Singaporean and Canadian novelist, poet, playwright
- Fred Wah, novelist, critic, writer, and former Canadian Parliamentary Poet Laureate
- Rita Wong, poet
- Paul Yee, historian, prolific writer of both children's and adult books about the Chinese Canadian experience
- Chia-ying Yeh, poet and scholar, UBC professor and Fellow of the Royal Society of Canada
- Ying Chen (应晨), novelist
- Xiran Jay Zhao, author of young adult and middle grade speculative fiction, Internet personality

== Science and technology ==
- Thomas Chang, physician, medical scientist, and inventor credited with co-inventing the world's first artificial cell
- James K. M. Cheng, architect
- Kin-Yip Chun, geophysicist
- Anming Hu, mechanical engineer, target of controversial US prosecution
- Roger Hui, computer scientist and co-developer of the J programming language
- Yuet Wai Kan, medical scientist and physician; pioneer of applying molecular biology and genetics into clinical medicine
- Victor Ling, medical researcher whose research focuses on drug resistance in cancer; known for his discovery of P-glycoprotein
- Tak Wah Mak, medical researcher, geneticist, oncologist, and biochemist; known for his discovery of the T-cell receptor and pioneering work in the genetics of immunology
- Bing Thom, architect
- Paul Tseng, applied mathematician who went missing while kayaking in the Yangtze River in the Yunnan province of China and is presumed dead
- Tsui, Lap-chee (徐立之), geneticist
- Joseph Yu Kai Wong, physician and philanthropist
- William Kwong Yu Yeung, astronomer; discoverer of asteroids and the comet 172P/Yeung
- Ban Chi-ho Tsui (徐志豪), anesthesiologist

== Education and academia ==
- Jerome Chen (陳志讓), historian of China, author, former professor at York University
- Kevin Chan, physician, Chair of Pediatrics at Memorial University in St. John's Newfoundland
- Larry Grant (洪禮興), Musqueam elder and adjunct professor at the University of British Columbia
- Konrad Ng, scholar of Asian-American cinema and digital media; director of Smithsonian Asian Pacific American Center; professor at University of Hawaii at Manoa
- Eleanor Ty (鄭綺寧), scholar of Asian North American literature, professor of English at Wilfrid Laurier University.

== Other ==
- Huseyincan Celil (赛因江·贾里力), Uyghur extradited to China from Uzbekistan
- Simon Chang, fashion designer
- Bill Chong (鄭根), spy for Britain during WW-II, awarded British Empire Medal.
- Eric Chong, professional chef and winner of MasterChef Canada (season 1)
- Sunny Fong, fashion designer
- Kevin He, ice hockey player
- Dan Liu (廖建明), fashion designer
- Susur Lee, chef and international restaurateur based in Toronto
- Alvin Leung (梁經倫), chef and TV personality
- Vincent Li (李偉光), committed infamous murder
- Moy Lin-shin (梅連羨), Taoist monk and founder of International Taoist Tai Chi Society (國際道家太極拳社)
- Cody Sun (孙立宇), professional League of Legends player
- Christopher Siu, professional chef and winner of MasterChef Canada (season 7)
- Riza Santos, beauty queen
- xChocoBars, a.k.a Janet Rose Xu. Internet personality and Twitch streamer
- Sunny Tang, founder of Wushu Canada and Sunny Tang Martial Arts Centre chain of martial arts centres
- Joseph Tsai, businessman
- Tse Chi Lop (謝志樂), alleged kingpin of the Sam Gor crime syndicate
- Adrian Wu, fashion designer
- Jason Wu, fashion designer
- Joe Zee – creative director of Elle magazine; host of fashion TV series All on the Line
