= Taiwanese Canadians =

Canadians of Taiwanese ancestry

Total population
- Overseas Taiwanese in Canada (2016 estimate): 173,000
- Taiwan-born Canadians (2021 census): 65,365
- Ethnic Taiwanese Canadians (Note: I.e., those who responded "Taiwanese" when asked what their ethnic identity was.) (2021 census): 64,020

Regions with significant populations
- Ottawa, Vancouver, Toronto, Montreal

Languages
- Chinese (Mandarin, Hokkien, Hakka), Formosan languages, English, French

Religion
- Chinese folk religions, Buddhism, Christianity, Taoism

Related ethnic groups
- Taiwanese people, Chinese Canadians

Taiwanese Canadians
- Traditional Chinese: 台灣裔加拿大人
- Simplified Chinese: 台湾裔加拿大人
Transcriptions
Standard Mandarin
- Hanyu Pinyin: Táiwān yì Jiānádà rén
Yue: Cantonese
- Jyutping: Toi^{4}waan^{1} jeoi^{6} Gaa^{1}naa^{4}daai^{6} jan^{4}

Taiwanese Canadians are Canadians who carry full or partial ancestry from the East Asian country of Taiwan. There are over one hundred thousand Taiwanese who have gained citizenship or permanent residency status in Canada.

== Immigration ==
Taiwanese people have been present in Canada since the 1970s but many of those immigrants have since moved to the United States and have become part of the Taiwanese American and Chinese American communities. Starting from the late 1980s, many Taiwanese people immigrated to Canada, especially Vancouver, British Columbia, and to the adjacent cities of Burnaby, Richmond, and Coquitlam to form a permanent Taiwanese Canadian community. The Greater Vancouver metropolitan area now has the largest Taiwanese community in Canada. There is also an established Taiwanese community in Toronto, but more spread out than its counterpart in Vancouver. Unlike the Taiwanese American community with a longer history in North America, the majority of the younger Taiwanese Canadians are either first generation or 1.5 generation immigrants who have either grown up entirely in Taiwan or have completed at least some elementary or junior high school education in Taiwan prior to immigrating to Canada. This is because many Taiwanese Canadian households are made up of households where the providers are people retired from their businesses and occupations in Taiwan, and decided to move their families (many with adolescent or grown-up children) to Canada. There are also many Taiwanese Canadian households where the primary provider (usually the father) is not retired and still conducts business in Taiwan which requires frequent travel between Taiwan and Canada and maybe even require living away from their families for part of the year or longer (this situation is typical of many Hongkongers as well).

== Languages ==
First-generation or 1.5-generation Taiwanese Canadians are often fluent in both Mandarin as well as Hokkien. To a lesser extent, Hakka is also spoken by those of Taiwanese Hakka heritage. Among the second generation, English often becomes their preferred language and linguistic fluency in the heritage language varies. Thus, many second-generation Taiwanese Canadians either speak Taiwanese as their heritage language and may not know any Mandarin, or speak Mandarin as their heritage language and know little Taiwanese (the latter is particularly common among families from the Taipei Metropolitan Area). Maintaining their heritage language depends on the efforts of their parents and whether the individuals are exposed to Mandarin through Mandarin Chinese schools. Second-generation Taiwanese of Hakka descent tend to speak better Mandarin as their heritage language. According to the 2011 census, 9,635 reported to speak Taiwanese as their mother tongue.

== Settlement in Vancouver ==
Many Taiwanese immigrants have recently (as of 2011) settled in Vancouver, B.C., forming a growing and stable Taiwanese Canadian community; however, it is often overlooked due to the presence of a larger Hong Kong immigrant base. Many of these immigrants from Taiwan, especially those without family or relatives in United States, find it easier to immigrate to Canada. These Taiwanese immigrants are also relatively wealthy and, like many Hongkongers, can afford Vancouver's high cost of living. The Greater Vancouver metropolitan area offers comfortable living and the conveniences of modern Chinese shopping centers with a vast array of restaurants, eateries, and grocery stores that provide the foods and entertainment that reflect the modern trends that Hongkongers and Taiwanese were accustomed to prior to arriving in Canada. Because Vancouver has more Hongkongers than Taiwanese, the fashions and products available largely reflect the modern trends of Hong Kong more so than Taiwan. This is in contrast to the Santa Clara Valley/Silicon Valley and San Gabriel Valley in California where there are concentrated communities with larger proportions of people of Taiwanese heritage and where many Chinese shopping centers, restaurants, supermarkets, and other retail businesses tend to reflect more of the modern Taiwanese trends. There are T&T Supermarkets in Canada as opposed to 99 Ranch Markets in the United States.

== Taiwanese Americans ==
Greater Vancouver also attracts Taiwanese American visitors from the Greater Seattle Area in the United States (approximately 200 km south of the Canada–US border). Vancouver is the only large Canadian city that is close in proximity to another large city just south of the Canada–US border and where both cities have well-established Chinese and Taiwanese communities.

The Greater Seattle Area overall has a larger and longer established Taiwanese population than Vancouver, but its Taiwanese residents are spread out over a vast area and not as highly concentrated in one area as those in Vancouver. The few "Chinese" shopping center complexes in Seattle's Chinatown–International District may be owned by Taiwanese and/or Chinese people but cater mostly to other Asians such as first-generation Southeast Asians of Vietnamese and Cambodian heritage. Shops particularly in the heart of International District are owned by older-established Cantonese/Taishanese Americans (the descendants of the first Chinese who built up most of the Chinatowns in many American cities). Seattle is much closer to Vancouver than to San Francisco, San Jose, and Los Angeles (all located in California with large Chinese and Taiwanese communities).

The Greater Vancouver area has amenities for Taiwanese and Chinese communities quite similar to these large California metropolitan areas. Despite the long wait times at the Canada–United States border customs, it is still worth a road trip up to Vancouver for food and commercial products (i.e., music CDs, books, snack items) from Taiwan and Hong Kong. Many Taiwanese Americans from the Greater Seattle Area and other Asian American hubs also have business and social connections and family ties to the Taiwanese Canadian families in Vancouver. University and college students of Chinese and Taiwanese heritage (primarily from the University of Washington's Seattle campus) make frequent road trips to Vancouver.

== Notable Taiwanese Canadians ==
- Tsai Ah-hsin (蔡阿信), first female Taiwanese physician, one of few immigrants emigrated in Japanese colonial period
- Angela Zhang (張韶涵), singer and actress in Taiwan
- Terry Chen, film and television actor
- Jacky Chou, internet entrepreneur
- Jacky Chu (祝釩剛), actor and the lead singer of Taiwanese group 183 Club
- Godfrey Gao, model and actor
- Ed Hill, award-winning stand-up comedian
- Christine Kuo (苟芸慧), actress based in Hong Kong
- Cindy Lee, founder of the T&T Supermarket chain
- Sherren Lee, film and television director
- Chungsen Leung (梁中心), businessman and federal MP for Willowdale
- Chase Tang (唐嘉壕), Taiwanese-Canadian actor, model and mental health advocate
- Joseph Tsai, vice chairman of Alibaba Group
- Paul Tseng, Taiwan-born American and Canadian applied mathematician
- Jason Wu (吳季剛), fashion designer based in Manhattan, New York City
- Eddie Peng (彭于晏), actor and singer in Taiwan
- Jeremy Wang, Twitch streamer and YouTube personality
- Demos Chiang, Taiwanese Canadian designer and businessman
- Mark Chao (趙又廷), Taiwanese-Canadian actor, model
- Emilio Estevez (蔡立靖), soccer player for Ado Den Haag and Taiwan

== See also ==
- Fo Guang Shan Temple, Toronto
- Ling Yen Mountain Temple
- Taiwanese people
- Taiwanese identity
- Taiwanese cuisine
- Taiwanese Americans
- Asian Canadians
- Taiwanese Canadian Association of Toronto
- East Asian Canadians
