= Propitious Mango ice cream =

Chinese mango-flavored ice cream

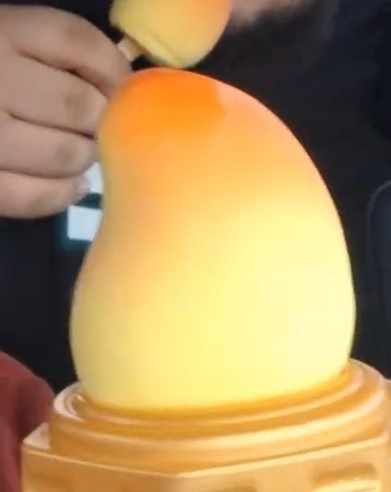
- Type: Ice cream
- Place of origin: China
- Serving temperature: Frozen
- Main ingredients: Mango-flavored ice cream, white chocolate shell
- Variations: Peach, Lemon

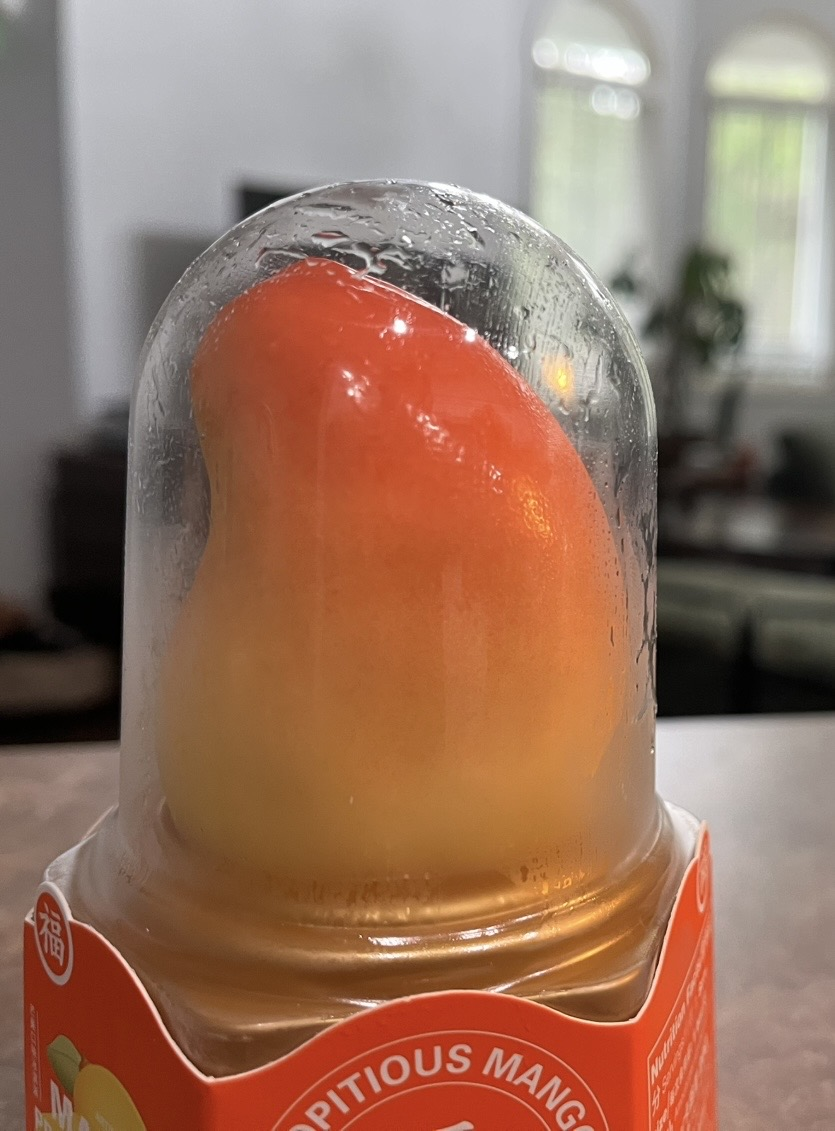
Propitious Mango ice cream in packaging

Propitious Mango ice cream is a specialty mango-flavored ice cream from China that became viral on TikTok known for its rich, creamy texture and aesthetic appearance.

== History ==
It is made by Hong Qi and became viral in 2024.

== Description ==
The Propitious Mango ice cream appears like a mango fruit and is on a wooden stick. It has a thin, crunchy white-chocolate coating. The ice cream inside is creamy and like mousse or sorbet with the flavor of mango. It is packaged in plastic domes. It does not contain any real mango.

== Availability and pricing ==
Due to its internet virality, it made it more challenging to obtain internationally. In the United States, it is primarily found in Asian supermarkets, including 99 Ranch Market, San Bruno Supermarket, and Rong Cheng Inc. 99 Ranch Market has carried the ice cream since 2022. In Canada, it could be found in T&T Supermarket. In Australia, several Asian grocery markets, such as Gong Grocer, carried the ice cream as well. Some stores struggled to meet consumer demand and some created waitlists.

In 2024–2025, prices ranged from $3.29 to $6 USD for a single ice cream to $11.99 for a three-pack.

== Variations ==
Other variations have been created such as peach and lemon. They similarly appear and are flavored like a peach and lemon, respectively. The peach ice cream is made by Tao Qi and went viral in 2022.
