= ATOT =

ATOT, atot, or variant, may refer to:

- AT-OT, a type of Imperial Walker from the Star Wars fictional universe
- Association of Taiwanese Organizations in Toronto, see Taiwanese Canadian Association of Toronto
- atot, AnandTech Off-Topic
- Attack on Titan, Japanese manga by Hajime Isayama
