= Cheng Sait Chia =

Chinese-Canadian poet

- Born: 1940; Singapore
- Died: 1981 (aged 40–41)
- Resting place: William Black Cemetery; Halifax, Nova Scotia
- Writing career
- Genres: Maritimer Imagism poetry
- Notable work: Turned Clay

Cheng Sait Chia (1940–1981) was a Chinese-Canadian poet whose work was only ever published posthumously. Her only published work is a 75-page book titled Turned Clay, released through Fiddlehead Poetry Books in 1981 after Chia's death. Her poetry has not been featured in any collections or anthologies thus far.

== Life and poetry ==
Cheng Sait Chia, a Chinese immigrant who settled on the east coast of Canada, was born in Singapore in 1940 to Siow Peck Liong and Teh Kim Heo. Her husband, born in 1943, was Tzu Tit. She died of cancer at the age of 41 and was buried in the William Black Cemetery of Halifax, Nova Scotia. Turned Clay was released that same year, 1981, following Chia's death.

Poet, essayist, and University of Toronto Canadian literature professor George Elliott Clarke is mentioned by Arc Poetry Magazine as the one who "rediscovered" Chia's poetry. He noted that "her work, though infused by her illness with the theme of death, exhibits an exhilarating refusal of luxury, heroic stoicism, and a stern and bracing morbidity." A recurring theme in Chia's writing is death, which can be attributed to her terminal illness serving as a constant reminder that her own end was near.

== Rediscovering Chia ==
In the summer of 2007, Arc Poetry Magazine released a special issue dedicated to "lost and neglected Canadian poets of the past," uncovering several individuals whose work was either forgotten or relatively unknown. Cheng Sait Chia was one of the latter, as her poetry had not been published till after her death. Others recognized in this special issue include Avi Boxer, Paul Potts, Audrey Alexander Brown, Thomas D'Arcy McGee, and Joseph Howe, in addition to more lost-and-found poets and writers.

She has been described as a Maritimer imagist poet and likened to John Thompson.

Guy Dixon, writer for The Globe and Mail wrote, "She might be seen as a leading light if she were read more widely."
