= Tom Chan =

- Born: Hong Kong
- Education: UC Berkeley (Bachelor of Arts in Architecture)
- Parent: Chan Shun (father)
- Relatives: Caleb Chan (brother)

Tom Chan is a Canadian businessman and philanthropist. He is known for donating $10 million in support of the University of British Columbia's Chan Centre for the Performing Arts, along with his brother, Caleb Chan.

== Awards and recognitions ==
Chan has been conferred two honorary degrees: Doctor of Laws from the Southwestern Adventist University and Doctor of Letters from the University of British Columbia.
