= Kiip =

American mobile advertising network

- Available in: English
- Owners: Brian Wong, Kiip, Inc.
- Website: Kiip.me
- Commercial: Yes
- Launched: 2010
- Current status: Inactive

Kiip was a mobile advertising network. It was co-founded by Brian Wong, Courtney Guertin, and Amadeus Demarzi in 2010. Kiip provided users with tangible rewards, such as a bottle of water for every eight miles run by a user in a game. Kiip's rewards platforms was designed for in-app engagement.

== History ==
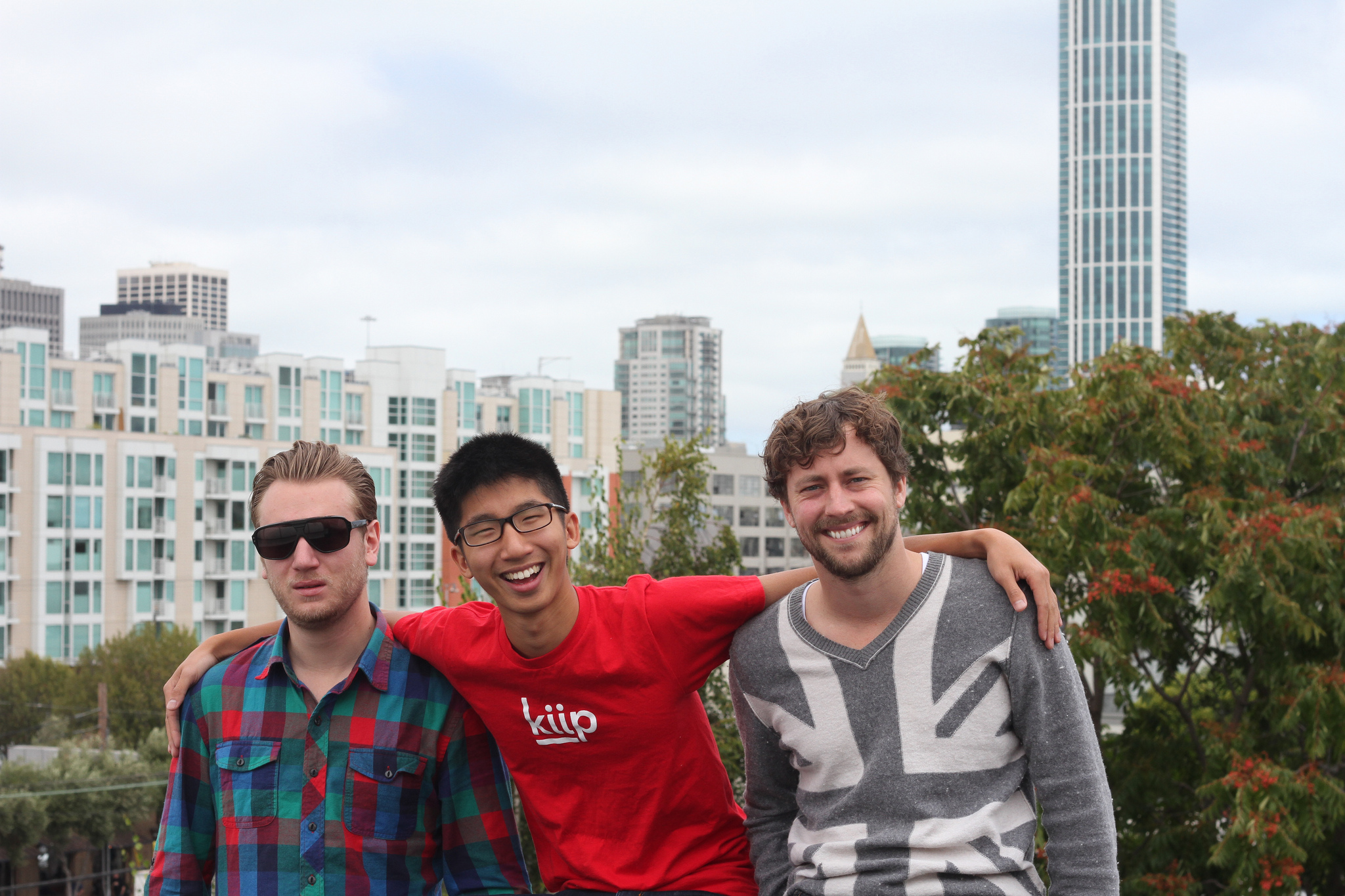
The Kiip co-founders

Wong, at 19, developed the idea for Kiip on an airplane, when he observed its passengers on their iPads. Many passengers were playing games, where the games' advertisements took up screen space that couldn't be used by the game itself. Wong hypothesized that instead, games could leverage moments of achievement—such as level ups and high scores—with a rewards program where advertisers could make consumer offers.

In July 2010, Wong teamed with Courtney Guertin and Amadeus Demarzi to found the company, and raised $300,000 in seed capital from True Ventures, Vast Ventures, Paige Craig, Rohan Oza, Keith Belling, Joe Stump, and Chris Redlitz. In subsequent A and B rounds, Kiip had raised a total of $15.4 million from investors including Relay Ventures, Hummer Winblad Venture Partners, Interpublic Group, American Express Ventures, Digital Garage, Crosslink Capital, True Ventures, Venture51, Transmedia Capital, and Verizon Ventures. In 2016 they received a Series C round of $12 million, for a total of $32 million. In October 2017, Kiip expanded its mobile rewards platform to Amazon’s Fire TV.

== Platform ==
The company said Kiip had about 75 million users per month across about 400 apps by 2013. The company had offices in San Francisco, New York City, Los Angeles, Chicago, Vancouver, London, Bogotá, and Tokyo. Apps using Kiip include games and fitness apps such as RunKeeper. The company had also integrated its system with productivity apps, such as Any.do and Finish 2.0. Kiip is also integrated with the Yahoo! Japan app, which was the first time Yahoo! Japan has integrated a third-party service into its app. Clients included 7-Eleven, Amazon, American Apparel, Campbell's, Ford, Hasbro, Macy's, McDonald's, Mondelēz International (formerly Kraft Foods), Pepsi, Procter & Gamble, Sony Music, Unilever, Verizon and Wrigley.

The company's platform offered real-world rewards to mobile users. It used developer tool software called Kiip Neon. In 2014, Kiip formed a strategic partnership with IPG to release a mobile usage study.

== Recognition ==
Kiip was listed by Fast Company as one of the 50 Most Innovative Companies in the world in 2013 and by Forbes as one of the "4 Hot Online Ad Companies". Kiip was also named to the Dow Jones' FasTech50 List.

== Lawsuit settlement, bankruptcy and acquisition ==
In July 2019, Kiip agreed to a $1 million settlement of a class action lawsuit claiming that Kiip had violated the law by collecting and using personal information about users without permission. Kiip admitted no wrongdoing when agreeing to the financial settlement.

On August 26, 2019, Kiip went into foreclosure terminating the majority of its employees with Diablo management group taking over the closure, sale of assets, and liquidation on September 15, 2019. NinthDecimal acquired the assets in bankruptcy court with subsequent details revealed in lawsuit filings in The Meet Group vs Kiip case filed in San Francisco court.
