= Margaret Lim =

Malaysian writer (1947–2011)

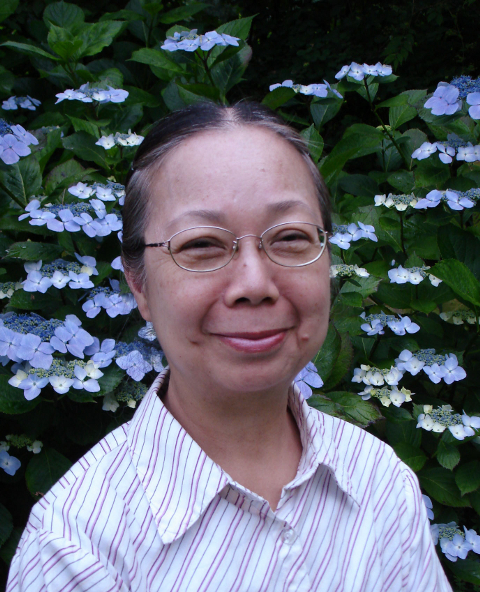
- Born: 1947; Kuching, Malaysia
- Died: 8 May 2011 (aged 63–64)
- Education: University of British Columbia, Queen's University, Kingston
- Writing career
- Genre: Children's book author

Margaret Lim Hui Lian (1947 – 8 May 2011) was a Malaysian-born Canadian children's book author. Her children's books are based on recollections of her own childhood, which she spent with the native people deep in the interior of Sarawak on the Island of Borneo. All her books are illustrated by her daughter Su Jen Buchheim, and published by her own company Fairy Bird Children's Books.

== Life ==
Born in 1947 in Kuching, Sarawak, Malaysia, Margaret Lim spent her childhood in the interior of Sarawak. She returned with her parents to Kuching, the capital of Sarawak, where she was educated at St. Teresa's Convent School for Girls, and St. Joseph's School. She went on to study in Canada and earned a B.A. in English from the University of British Columbia, Canada, and a Bachelor in Education degree from Queen's University, Kingston, Ontario, Canada.

Lim taught 10th- and 11th-graders English Literature in Sarawak, Malaysia, before she moved with her husband to Germany.

There being few books by Malaysian writers, especially books for children, Lim established Fairy Bird Children's Books in May 2005 in her home town Kuching, Malaysia, with the express purpose of producing exciting books which nurture children, and which draw on the rich culture of Sarawak.

She divided her time between her residence in Germany and her home country Malaysia. She had no pets, but enjoyed feeding the birds that flocked to her garden.

Her childhood dream was to be a librarian or museum curator. Her advice was: "Whatever you do, dream on!"

Margaret Lim died on 8 May 2011, from cancer.

== Awards and honours ==
Margaret Lim was included in the Sarawak Women's Museum, Kuching, Malaysia, on 6 August 2007.

She was nominated for the Astrid Lindgren Memorial Awards (ALMA) 2008.

== Books ==
=== Payah ===
Payah is Margaret Lim's first children's book. It was published in 2005 and is about a fearless little Kayan girl called Payah, with a very soft heart for small helpless creatures. Deep in the rainforest of Sarawak, Malaysia, Payah rescues a hornbill and a mouse deer, and takes care of a baby orang-utan. It is written for children aged eight to twelve,

=== Four Eyes ===
Payah's heart is broken. Her beloved playmates, Sammy, the baby orang-utan, and Kenyi, the hornbill, have left for the Semenggoh Wildlife Rehabilitation Centre.

A diversion occurs that makes Payah forget her heartache. Ripening fruits from her great-aunt's well-tended garden mysteriously disappear night after night...Who from the longhouse dares to steal Uku Nyalo's fruits? Or, are the spirits teasing Uku Nyalo?

Payah makes a surprising discovery, and takes on a responsibility that becomes almost too much for her to bear. She befriends a run-away and keeps him hidden. She also learns the reason behind her great-aunt's constant bad temper.

=== Precious Jade and Turnip Head ===
Payah and her best friend, Usun, celebrate Chinese New Year with their classmate, Precious Jade, down in Kampung, China and learn why Precious Jade's little brother is called Turnip Head.

Four Eyes, a little orphan Penan boy, whom Payah had befriended and is now in the care of Payah's great-aunt, Uku Nyalo, is Turnip Head's best friend.

As one of Uku Nyalo's hens disappears, Payah senses trouble brewing. While everyone seems to develop a laissez-faire attitude towards the disappearance of Uku Nyalo's best chicken layer, Uku Nyalo herself sets out to investigate, leaving no stone unturned.

Meanwhile, Payah has learnt that Four Eyes and Turnip Head are behind the disappearance of Uku Nyalo's chicken layer. Out of fear that Four Eyes would be banished from her longhouse she tries to hinder her great-aunt's investigation.

However even Payah cannot out-fox Uku Nyalo, whose unerring instinct leads her to Turnip Head as the main culprit. She demands compensation from Turnip Head's great-grandmother who is famous up and down Belaga for her legendary White Leghorns that are capable of laying up to 300 eggs a year.

But Turnip Head's great-grandmother is as wily as they come. She sees her chance in getting rid of her fattest (and laziest) Leghorn. However, she does not come unscathed out of this confrontation, nor do Four Eyes or Turnip Head.

=== Nonah, or The Ghost of Gunung Mulu ===
Nonah, from the tiny fishing village of Santubong on the west coast of Sarawak, joins her parents where they are teaching in a school deep in the rainforest.

Nonah is not only homesick for her coastal homeland, she is also a very shy girl. But she soon loses her shyness once she is befriended by Payah and her friends, Usun and Precious Jade, for whom shyness is an alien word.

They write a story winning them a trip to Sarawak's loveliest of National Parks – Gunung Mulu.

The journey to Gunung Mulu National Park involves crossing rapids and, for the girls, exciting plane rides. In Gunung Mulu National Park they uncover a plot to steal very rare orchids.

=== Jump, Bilun Jump ===
Jump Bilun Jump! is a theatre play written by Margaret Lim. Spider-bird, charged with a message to invite Bilun to a birthday party, is distracted by sights of his favourite foods, spiders and flowers full of nectar, while on the way. He arrives with his message, allowing Bilun little time to get to the party on time.

Bilun is naturally annoyed with Spider-bird, whose wounded feelings have to be soothed first before Bilun can begin his dangerous journey to Long Lama where his brother mouse deer is holding the birthday party. Then Bilun has to convince the King of the upriver crocodiles to line up his crocodile subjects all the way down to Long Lama, so that Bilun can count them. If there are more upriver crocodiles than estuarine crocodiles, the King of the upriver crocodiles will be the undisputed king of all crocodiles.

While Bilun is fixed on getting down to Long Lama before the sun goes down, King Croc is fixed on having Bilun as his supper before sunset. Bilun has to be on his toes if he has to outwit King Croc who seems to be smarter than Bilun thinks he is.
