= Kin-Yip Chun =

Canadian geophysicist

Kin-Yip Chun is a Canadian geophysicist at the University of Toronto's Department of Physics. He gained attention when he sued the University of Toronto for alleged racial discrimination.

== Academic career ==
Chun received a Bachelor of Applied Science degree in Engineering Science from the University of Toronto, an M.A. in Geophysics at Columbia University and a Ph.D. at Berkeley. From 1983 to 1984, he was a postdoctoral fellow at the Lawrence Berkeley Laboratory at UC Berkeley. He joined the University of Toronto as a research associate in 1985. His research was in seismology.

As a research associate, he was not on the university's payroll. He depended upon research grants to fund his work and cover his living expenses. Chun remained a research associate for nine years, serving as a `status only' faculty member from 1990 to 1992. His employment was never transformed into a permanent academic appointment. He applied for the four permanent, tenure-stream positions that came open at the University of Toronto in geophysics between 1987 and 1992. He was short-listed for the first three positions, but was not successful in any. He was not short-listed on the fourth.

In 1994, the University appointed a dean from the faculty of medicine to investigate allegations that Chun had that he had been “improperly denied a permanent academic position in the Department of Physics because of his race” and that he had been “the victim of harassment and discrimination by faculty members in the Department of Physics based on his race.”

The report, which was released in October 1994, reviewed the job searches and determined that there was no evidence that, “Dr. Chun was improperly denied a permanent academic position in the department of physics because of his race.” Chun's contract was terminated at the end of 1994.

== The Dr. Chun Case ==
Chun's dismissal soon drew nationwide media attention to his plight. He was supported by many student groups and the Ontario NDP leader Howard Hampton. In June 1995, the Canadian Association of University Teachers (CAUT) sent two members of the Academic Freedom and Tenure (AF&T) Committee to the University of Toronto to investigate, and their report suggested a pattern of systematic discrimination. The AF&T also made several recommendations, including allowing Chun to return to the university with a salary and job security, and holding a fair competition for a tenured position in the faculty. The Ontario Human Rights Commission backed Chun's complaint, stating that racism was a factor in stopping him from obtaining a full-time position, describing the Physics Department as a "poisoned work environment", "cronyism", "the dynamic of an 'old boys' network" operating in all four job competitions, and "a series of reprisals culminating in his dismissal".

The university however refused to acknowledge the AF&T report and its recommendations, and tried to have the OHRC dismiss the case. The case dragged on for years. Back in 1994, the university's own appointed investigator for the case, Dr. Cecil Yip, stated that Dr. Chun "acted and has been treated like a professoriate in spite of the fact he has derived his salary support entirely from his own external research contracts. And he has served the Department and the University well in this capacity." Further, "it is certainly justified for Dr. Chun to feel ... he is being penalized for good performance", and concluded, "In my judgment Dr. Chun has been exploited by the Department." Overall, the Yip Report concluded that Chun had been exploited, though it found no evidence that he had been a victim of racism.

In 1998, Chun launched a $1-million lawsuit against the university for unjust dismissal.

== Settlement and aftermath ==
By the time the controversy had ended, President Robert Prichard had departed and he had been succeeded by Robert Birgeneau. A mediated settlement was reached in 2000 and Chun dropped his appeal against the Ontario Human Rights Commission, as well as his $1-million lawsuit against the university. In return, Chun received a full-time faculty position of Research Scientist and Adjunct Professor, $100,000 in compensation, an estimated $150,000 in legal fees and a $260,000 research start-up fund.

Columns by Margaret Wente of The Globe and Mail which attacked the settlement received severe criticism from members of the university community.

The Arts & Science Students' Union (ASSU), which represents more than 22,000 full-time undergraduate students at the University of Toronto described the incident as the "Dr. Chun miscarriage of justice" when bringing up the controversies of Prichard's administration, on the back of their 2001 Arts and Sciences Anti-Calendar.

In 2003, the Canadian Association of University Teachers (CAUT) established a committee to study Dr. Chun's case. They concluded there were "serious irregularities" in the hiring process in each case and that Dr. Chun was treated unfairly. They discovered when he had made allegations of systemic discrimination, he was subject to various forms of harassment and unfair treatment, such as being prevented from attending departmental meetings, denied a faculty library card, frustrated from pursuing his research, and prohibited from teaching courses. The inquiry described this as a serious violation of academic freedom.
