= Yip Sang =

Canadian businessman (1845–1927)

- 葉春田
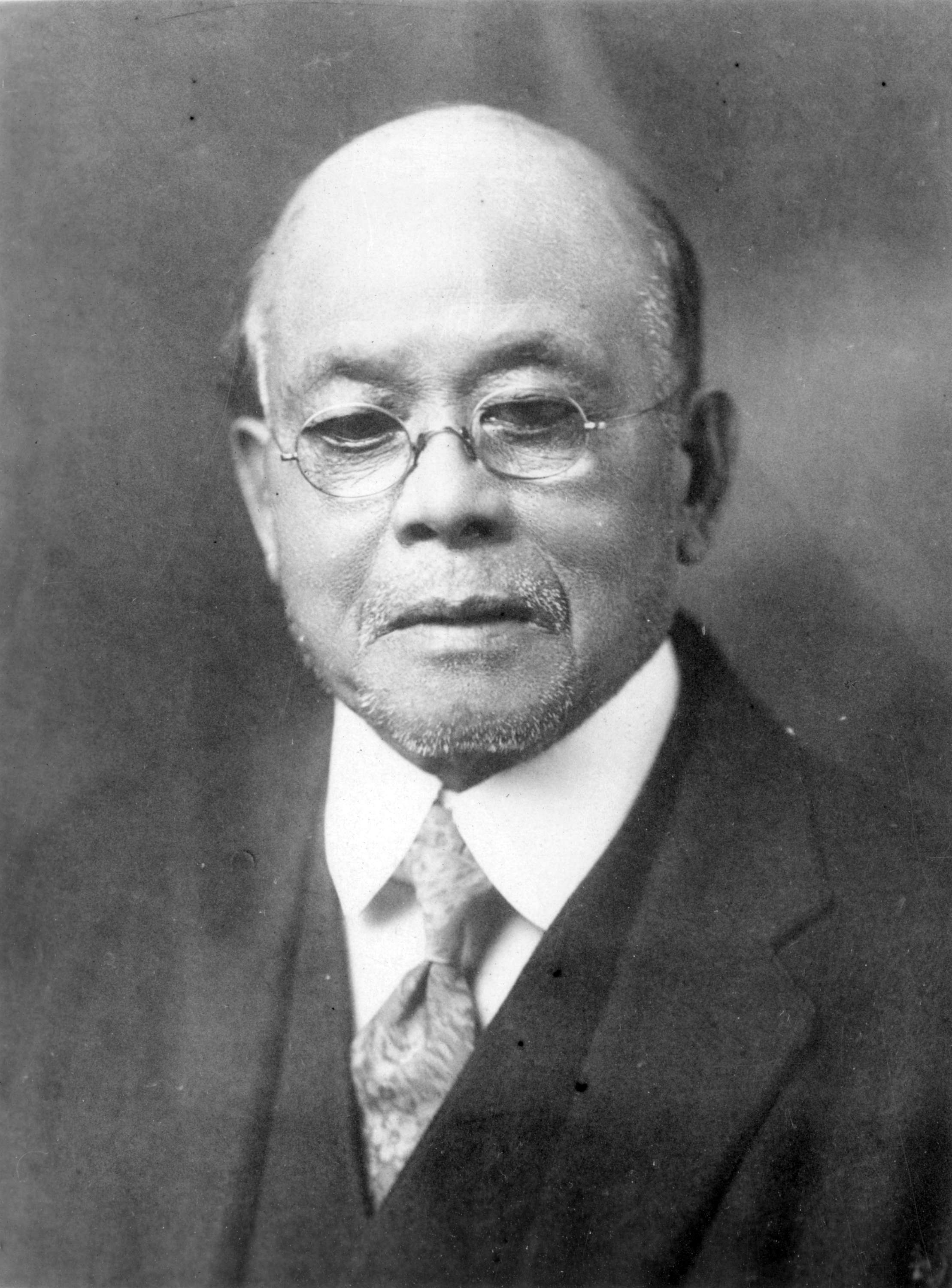
- Yip Sang c. 1920
- Born: 6 September 1845; Taishan, Guangdong, Qing China
- Died: 1927 (aged 81–82); Vancouver, British Columbia, Canada
- Occupations: Merchant, activist

Chinese name
- Traditional Chinese: 葉春田
Transcriptions
Standard Mandarin
- Hanyu Pinyin: Yè Chūntián

Yip Sang (Chinese: 葉春田; pinyin: Yè Chūntián; 6 September 1845 – 1927) was a prominent Canadian businessman, whose business and family flourished during the period when Chinese Canadians faced discrimination and restrictions. On top of his business and real estate holding, Yip was also a social reformer and political activist in Canada.

== Early life ==
Yip Sang was born on September 6, 1845, in Shengtang village (聖堂), Taishan County, Guangdong, into a poor family. Yip went to California as a general labourer in 1864 and then to work in the goldfields in Canada in 1881.

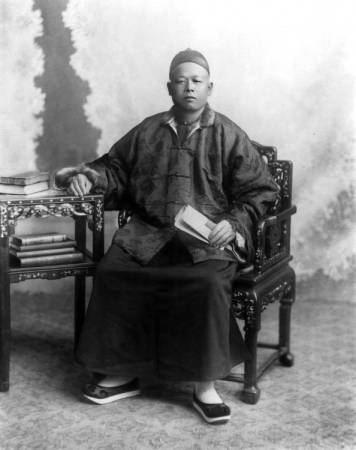
Yip Sang, 1890

Yip arrived in Vancouver to work as a coal salesman, then as a bookkeeper, timekeeper, and paymaster for the Canadian Pacific Railway Supply Company. He quickly worked up the ranks and became a superintendent of Chinese labourers. Familiar with Chinese language and culture, Yip Sang was a valuable agent to the company in contracting labor from China. From 1881 to 1885, Yip Sang oversaw, 7,000 Chinese labourers for the Canadian Pacific Railway Company. After the Canadian Pacific Railway was completed in 1885, Yip Sang returned to China. Yip Sang had four wives, Lee Shee, Dong Shee, Wong Shee, and Chin Shee, with whom he had 23 children.

== Community leader ==
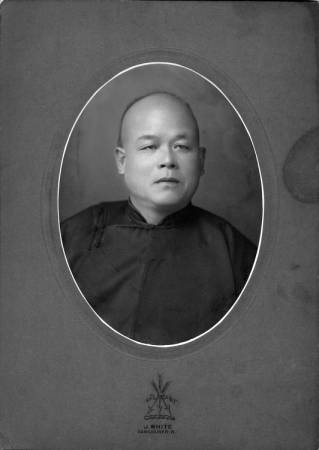
Portrait of Yip Sang

By 1888, Yip had returned to Canada and started his own business the Wing Sang Company, which provided labour contracting, as well as import/export business to and from the Far East. His company operated with his former employer, Canadian Pacific Railway Supply Company, sourcing labour and produce. Unlike most Chinese men of his time in working in Canada, who remained in manual labor due to racial discrimination, Yip was able to rise socially and economically and achieve success.

Already fluent in English, Yip became a naturalized British subject by 1891 and held a successful business and real estate portfolio in 1908. Within the Vancouver Chinese community, Yip was a local leader and helped establish the Chinese Benevolent Association of Vancouver, the Chinese Board of Trade of Vancouver and Life Governor of the Vancouver General Hospital. He helped create a hospital and public school for the Chinese community of Vancouver

Yip was also involved in the political movement in promoting political reform in China via the Chinese Empire Reform Association.

In 1901, Yip brought his entire family to Canada. Some of his children were also able to succeed in life in Canada. His daughter, Susanne, attended the University of British Columbia and was later Principal of Kwangtung Provincial Girls' Middle School in Guangzhou in the 1930s. His son, K. Dock Yip, attended Osgoode Law School and was one of the few Chinese Canadian lawyers before 1947 and also a community leader in Toronto's first Chinatown.

Yip Sang died in 1927 and left a small fortune to his 18 sons. He is buried at Mountain View Cemetery.

The Wing Sang Company was renamed Yip Sang Ltd. in 1950, with the business dissolving at a later date.

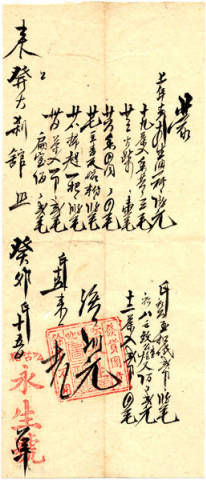
Incomes statement of Wing Sang Company, 1903

The Wing Sang Building (1889) at 51 East Pender is one of the city's oldest buildings. It was occupied by Yip Sang Travel Agency Limited in 1955 and abandoned years later. Vancouver condo marketer Bob Rennie refurbished the building in the 2000s. It now holds the Rennie Collection of contemporary art.

== Children ==
- Susanne Yip Gimling – principal and Professor at Sun Yat-sen University; retired in Canada
- K. Dock Yip – graduated from Osgoode Hall Law School in Toronto and became Canada's first lawyer of Asian descent
- Yip Kew Sheck, Yip Kew Ming and Yip Kew Yacht – ran remittance company in Vancouver
- Yip Kew Dang and Yip Kew Yacht – ran a gas station
- Yip Kue Him – bake shop owner
- Yip Kew Quene – track star; later owned a saltery, chemist and life insurance agent

== See also ==
- Economic History of Vancouver
