= Chan Centre for the Performing Arts =

Arts centre in Vancouver, British Columbia, Canada

Coordinates: 49°16′10″N 123°15′18″W

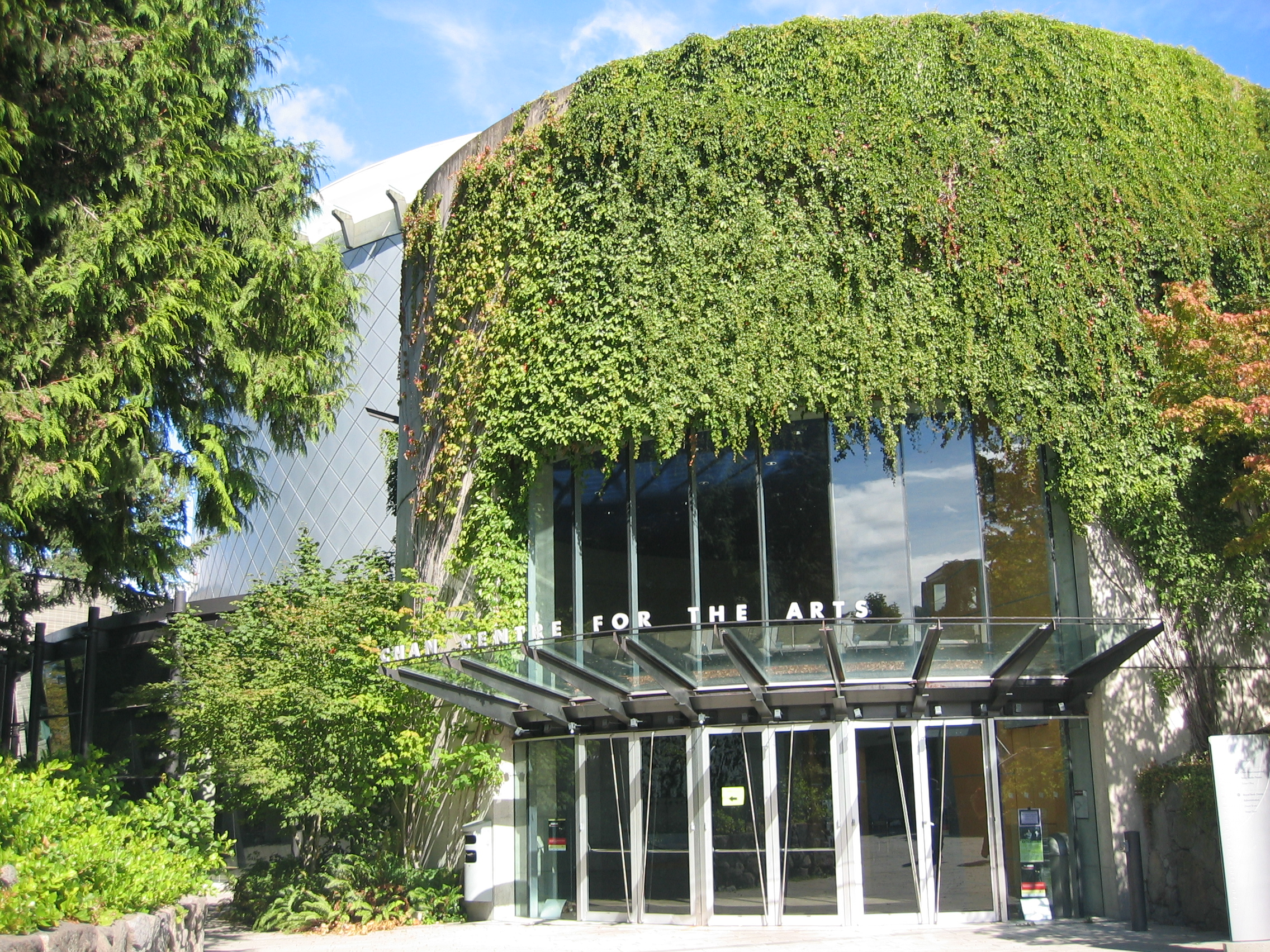
Chan Shun Concert Hall, at the Chan Centre

The Chan Centre for the Performing Arts is located on the campus of the University of British Columbia in Vancouver, British Columbia, Canada. It is situated within the natural landscape of the campus and is surrounded by evergreens and rhododendrons. This state of the art performing arts venue holds the 1,200-seat Chan Shun Concert Hall, the flexible-seating Telus Studio Theatre, the 160-seat Royal Bank Cinema, the Great Performers Lounge, and a glass lobby. Completed in 1997, the Chan Centre hosts classes, rehearsals and performances for a variety of the UBC departments of music, film and theatre as well as a diverse, yearly performing arts season that attracts audiences from all over the Lower Mainland.

== History ==
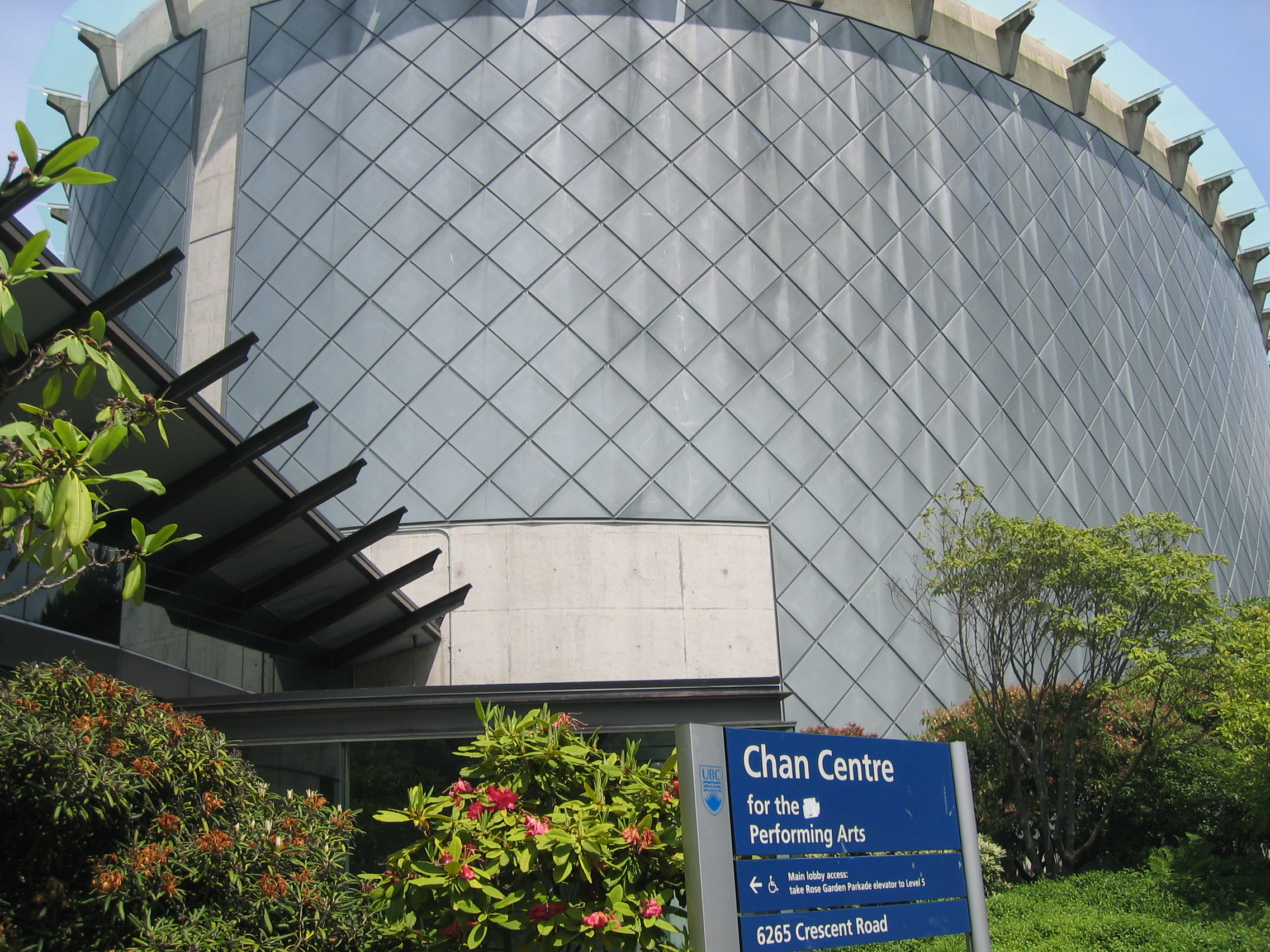
Chan Centre's exterior as seen from Crescent Road

The creation of the Chan Centre was made possible by an initial donation from two brothers and businessmen, Tom and Caleb Chan. This was the largest private donation to a cultural institution in Canadian history at the time. The Chan brothers also donated additional funds in order to set up an endowment fund which, through the interest revenue that it generates, supports many arts organizations and diverse performances at the local, national and international level.

The Chan brothers are philanthropists, businessmen and Seventh-day Adventists. Their father, Chan Shun, worked his way up in the business world, from sewing in a shirt factory to eventually becoming the head of the Crocodile Garments textile and clothing company. His sons were strongly influenced by his morals and generosity and in the 1980s, after immigrating to Canada, they decided to give back to their new country by helping to build an educational arts facility at UBC. They approached president David Strangway (president of UBC from 1985 to 1997) and made the proposal, and soon, the concept for a performing arts centre was in motion.

The construction of the Chan Centre took 2 years to complete and the official opening occurred on May 11, 1997. The cost came to approximately $25 million with donations from the Chan Foundation of Canada, BC Tel (now Telus), the Royal Bank of Canada, and the Provincial Government of British Columbia.

== Architecture ==
The Chan Centre was a collaborative project between three companies; Bing Thom Architects from Vancouver created the overall building design, Artec Consultants in New York City designed the concert hall and acoustic specifications, and Theatre Projects Consultants designed the studio theatre. The exterior was designed by landscape architect Cornelia Oberlander.

== Venues ==
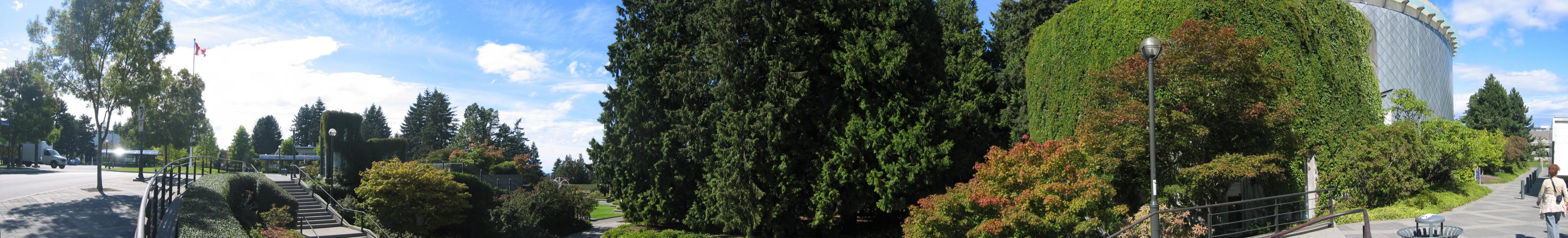
Panorama of the Chan Centre for the Performing Arts at the University of British Columbia.

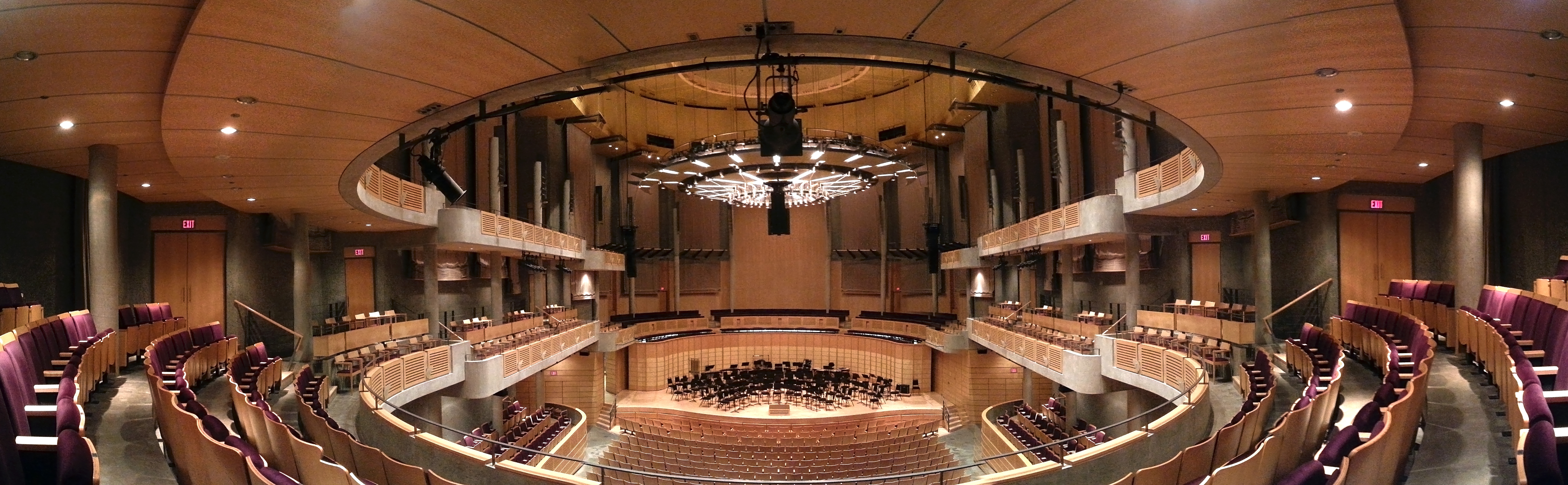
Multiple photos of the interior at The Chan Centre For The Performing Arts stitched together in a panoramic view for publication in the magazine Professional Sound.

=== Chan Shun Concert Hall ===
The highlight of the Chan Centre is the Chan Shun Concert Hall. It was named after Tom and Caleb's father, Chan Shun, to honour his lifelong generosity. The concert hall has a capacity of 1,185 plus 180 choral loft seats which can be used if necessary.

Hanging like a chandelier over the stage of the concert hall is the 37-tonne acoustic canopy, a sound reflector made of steel and cork which can be adjusted in height by a small motor. The hall also features motorized sound-absorbent fabric banners to acoustically mask walls. Flexibility and adaptability are key features in the design of the concert hall. The cello-like shape of the hall comes from the acoustically successful shoe box shape which allows for an even distribution of sound throughout the performance space. This shape also allows for a more consistent sound experience for audience members, no matter where they are sitting in the hall.

The Chan Centre was constructed with over 6,500 cubic metres of concrete which can be seen throughout the building. In the concert hall, the concrete walls are convex, and have been jack hammered to create a stippled surface which helps to break down sound and prevent reverb; it also promotes a warm and intimate sound. All of the wood seen in the concert hall has been sealed to the concrete in order to prevent any sympathetic vibrations.

=== Telus Studio Theatre ===
Modeled after the Globe Theatre in London, this intimate and flexible studio theatre seats between 160 and 275 people depending on the seating configuration. The theatre holds 12 – 3 level seating towers which can be moved using an air castor system, a technique used by Boeing to move airplane parts. Compressed air is blown through tubes and the towers then hover approximately 1/2 inch above the ground and are moved into configuration by 4-6 people.

Although theatre productions, both from within the UBC Theatre Department and from the community, are the prevalent art form programmed in the studio theatre, it has also become a popular venue for small music ensembles, film shoots, CD release parties and dance recitals.

=== Royal Bank Cinema ===
The small, 160-seat cinema has multiple projection capabilities, including: Super 8, Xenon Slide projection, DVD, VHS, 16 mm and 35 mm. Although it is used primarily as a classroom for UBC film students, it also hosts conferences and has been the venue for the European Union Film Festival.

== Television appearances ==
The building has featured in several television shows. It was used as "The 4400 Center" in several episodes of The 4400, and as the location for the "World Tolerance Initiative Annual Conference 2010" in season 2 episode 14 of Fringe. As well in the series of Stargate Atlantis, season 2 episode 5. In the re-imagined Battlestar Galactica it is a building in the Cloud 9 luxury ship, and was used as the meeting place for the Quorum of Twelve. In 2008, it was shown again, but this time, as The Madacorp building in the ABC Family show Kyle XY. Where Kyle, Declan, and Tom Foss were seen at in the episode called "House of Cards" and then it was later seen again in the episode called "C.I.R., With Love", when the whole Trager family go to The Madacorp Open House with Stephen. Psych Season 6, Episode 7 ‘In for a Penny’, also featured the exterior as the site of a penny heist. It was also used as the "Mendel Institute" school in Season 1 Episode 10 "Perception" in the series Almost Human in 2014. In 2015 it was used for being "I am The Center" church in Season 1 Episode 3 of Backstrom. In 2017, the lobby of the Chan Shun Concert Hall and the Telus Studio Theater were seen in multiple episodes of Legion. The exterior is also seen as Building 19 at the CDC in the final season of iZombie in 2019.

== See also ==
- List of concert halls
