= Gary Ho =

Gary Ho is a Taiwanese-born Canadian businessman, humanitarian, and philanthropist. He is a real estate developer and the CEO of the Canadian chapter of the Tzu Chi Foundation, which he established in 1992.

== Biography ==
Before immigrating to Canada in his 40s, he became a successful real estate developer in Taiwan. He is at the helm of the Canadian arm of the Tzu Chi Foundation, a Taiwan-based Buddhist charity with five million members worldwide. Tzu Chi operates in many countries, with 2,100 active volunteers in British Columbia with 8,000 donors. He has directed to donate more than $6 million to the BC Children's Hospital, UBC, Canadian Red Cross, the Canadian Cancer Society, and the Salvation Army. He also donated almost $2 million to create the Tzu Chi Institute for Complementary Medicine at Vancouver General Hospital in 1996. He also donated $1 million to the Vancouver General Hospital. He is a devout follower of Venerable Master Cheng Yen, a Buddhist nun and founder of Buddhist Compassion Relief Tzu Chi Foundation, who was named one of Time magazine's most influential people in the world in 2011, for his volunteerism and commitment as a humanitarian.

== Personal life ==
Due to business demands, Ho divides his time between Vancouver and Taipei.
