= Taiwanese Canadian Association of Toronto =

- Abbreviation: TCAT
- Formation: 1963; 62 years ago
- Type: Non-Governmental
- Legal status: Non-Profit
- Purpose: Social, Cultural
- Headquarters: Toronto, ON, Canada
- Official language: English, Taiwanese, Mandarin, Hakka
- Staff: 24
- Website: tcatoronto.com

Taiwanese Canadian Association of Toronto (TCAT), the largest general-purpose all-ages Taiwanese organization in the Greater Toronto Area, was established back in 1963 and later registered as a non-profit organization in the Province of Ontario in 1975.

The stated objectives of TCAT are: to promote the common interest and welfare of the members, to provide cultural and recreational activities for the Taiwanese community, and to better the inter-group relations within the context of Canadian multiculturalism.

TCAT hosts cultural, social, and sport events throughout the year and also publishes three issues of TOGETHER magazines each year.

Two divisions, namely the Formosan Cup Division (tFCD) and the Public Affair Division (tPAD), were established in 1974 and 2009 respectively to focus on special events that promotes multiculturalism.

== Missions ==
- To assist with Taiwanese immigrants, who reside in the GTA, in adapting to the environment of Canada.
- To gather members to serve local communities within the GTA.
- To provide methods of communications between members and all three levels of Canadian governments.
- To maintain and promote Taiwanese culture to the Canadian society.

== History ==
TCAT was founded in the spring of 1963. Professor Assistant, Yi-Ming Huang, and two post graduate students at the University of Waterloo invited about 20 Taiwanese overseas students from Ontario and Quebec to Niagara Falls for a day trip. After dinner, one student suggested to establish an association with a mission to strengthen communication and supports among overseas students from Taiwan. In a unanimous decision, Dr. Yi-Ming Huang and Dr. Chien-Si Cheng were elected as the President and Vice President, respectively.

A year later, TCAT had tremendous increase in memberships and Professor Jui-Yang Lin was elected as the President at the inaugural meeting in Cornwall. TCAT was registered as a non-profit corporation on October 22, 1975. Members in the early days had been devoting their time, effort, and money to Taiwanese democratic activities. Since then, the association has evolved and adapted to increasing immigrants; its events and activities become more diversified.

== Structure ==
- Members
- Board of Directors (BoD)
  - President
  - Vice-Presidents
  - Secretary
  - Treasurers
  - Directors
  - Advisors
  - Auditors
- Divisions
  - Formosan Cup Division (tFCD)
  - Public Affair Division (tPAD)

== Membership ==
TCAT Membership Cards

All TCAT members meet the following membership criteria:

- Be 18 years of age or older, or with permissions of legal guardians for those under the age of 18
- Agree with all missions of TCAT

=== Regular Member ===
- Must meet all membership criteria
- Must reside near the Greater Toronto Area
- The member, his/her spouse or one of the parents was born in Taiwan

Regular members have the right to vote, be elected, recall and resolve.

=== Supporting Member ===
- Meets all membership criteria
- Does not meet the requirements of Regular Member
- Must be nominated by two Regular Members
- Must be approved by the BoD

Supporting Members have all the membership privileges except for the following: rights to vote, to be elected, to recall, and to resolve.

=== Honorary Member ===
- Meets all membership criteria
- Has made outstanding contributions to the Taiwanese Canadian community or TCAT, or made one time significant donation
- Must be nominated and approved by the BoD

Honorary Members do not need to pay for membership dues, and have all the membership privileges except for the following: rights to vote, to be elected, to recall, and to resolve.

== Divisions ==
=== Formosan Cup Division ===
The Formosan Cup Division (tFCD) of TCAT hosts a softball tournament that has been widely regarded as one of the premier Asian softball events in all of North America.

== Events ==
Sample TCAT Event Poster

=== Annual Events ===
- Spring
  - Taiwan Heritage Week/Day
  - Parents' Day Celebration
- Summer
  - Summer Joint BBQ
- Autumn
  - Mid-Autumn Festival
- Winter
  - Annual General Meeting
  - Lunar New Year Festival

=== Regular Events ===
- TCAT Sportacular
  - Bi-monthly/Monthly sports events that involve basketball and badminton games.

=== Special Events ===
- Aug 2010
  - Yen-Hsun Lu at Rogers Cup on Aug 10, 2010
- Feb 2012
  - NBA Jeremy Lin vs Toronto Raptors Part I on Feb 14, 2012
- Mar 2012
  - TCAT 2012 Basketball Night on Mar 15, 2012
  - NBA Jeremy Lin vs Toronto Raptors Part II on Mar 23, 2012

== TOGETHER Magazine ==
Sample "Together" magazine cover

Available for TCAT members only in either printed or electronics format.

Targeted publishing dates for each year:

- Apr 15
- Aug 15
- Dec 15

== Affiliations ==
- World
  - World Federation of Taiwanese Associations (WFTA)
- Canada
  - Taiwanese Canadian Association (TCA)
- Ontario
  - Canadian Multicultural Council - Asians in Ontario (CMC-AO)
- Toronto
  - Association of Taiwanese Organizations in Toronto (ATOT)
  - Taiwanese Canadian Toronto Credit Union (TCTCU)
  - Formosa Evergreen Senior Citizens Centre (FESCC)

== See also ==
- Taiwan
- Canada
- Toronto
- Taiwanese Canadian
