= K. Dock Yip =

Canadian lawyer

Kew Dock Yip
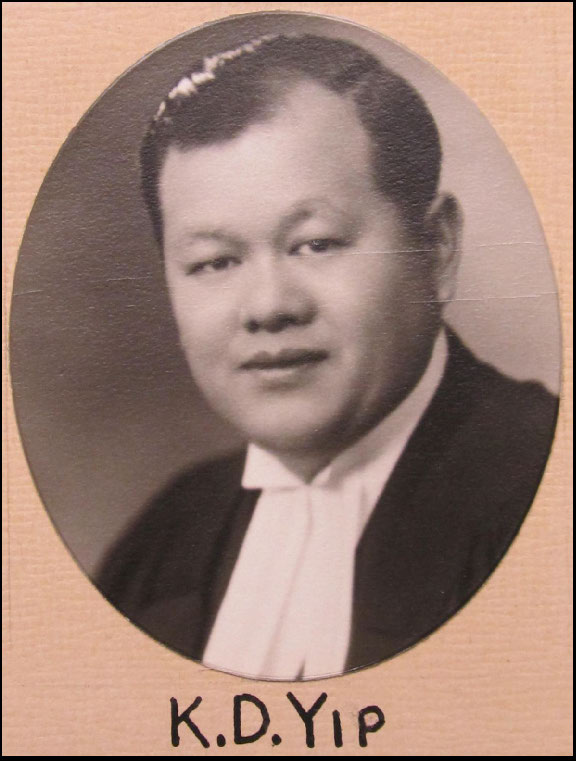
- Osgoode Hall Law School – Class of 1945
- Born: 1906; Vancouver, British Columbia, Canada
- Died: October 2001 (aged 94); Toronto, Ontario, Canada
- Education: University of Michigan; University of British Columbia; Osgoode Hall Law School; Ryerson University
- Occupation: Lawyer
- Years active: 1945–1992
- Known for: First Chinese-Canadian lawyer; Fought for the 1947 repeal of the Chinese Exclusion Act
- Spouse: Victoria Jane Chow
- Children: 3
- Parent: Yip Wang Sang
- Awards: Law Society of Upper Canada Medal 1998

Kew Dock Yip (葉求鐸; pinyin: Yè Qiúduó; 1906–2001) was community leader in Toronto's First Chinatown, the first Canadian lawyer of Chinese descent, and played a critical role in helping repeal the Canadian Chinese Exclusion Act in 1947. He is the third youngest son of Yip Sang, a prominent Chinese merchant and paymaster of CP Railway, in Vancouver in the 1900s.

== Early years ==
Yip was born in Vancouver in 1906, the 17th of 19 sons, and one of 23 children born to prominent Canadian businessman Yip Wang Sang's four wives.

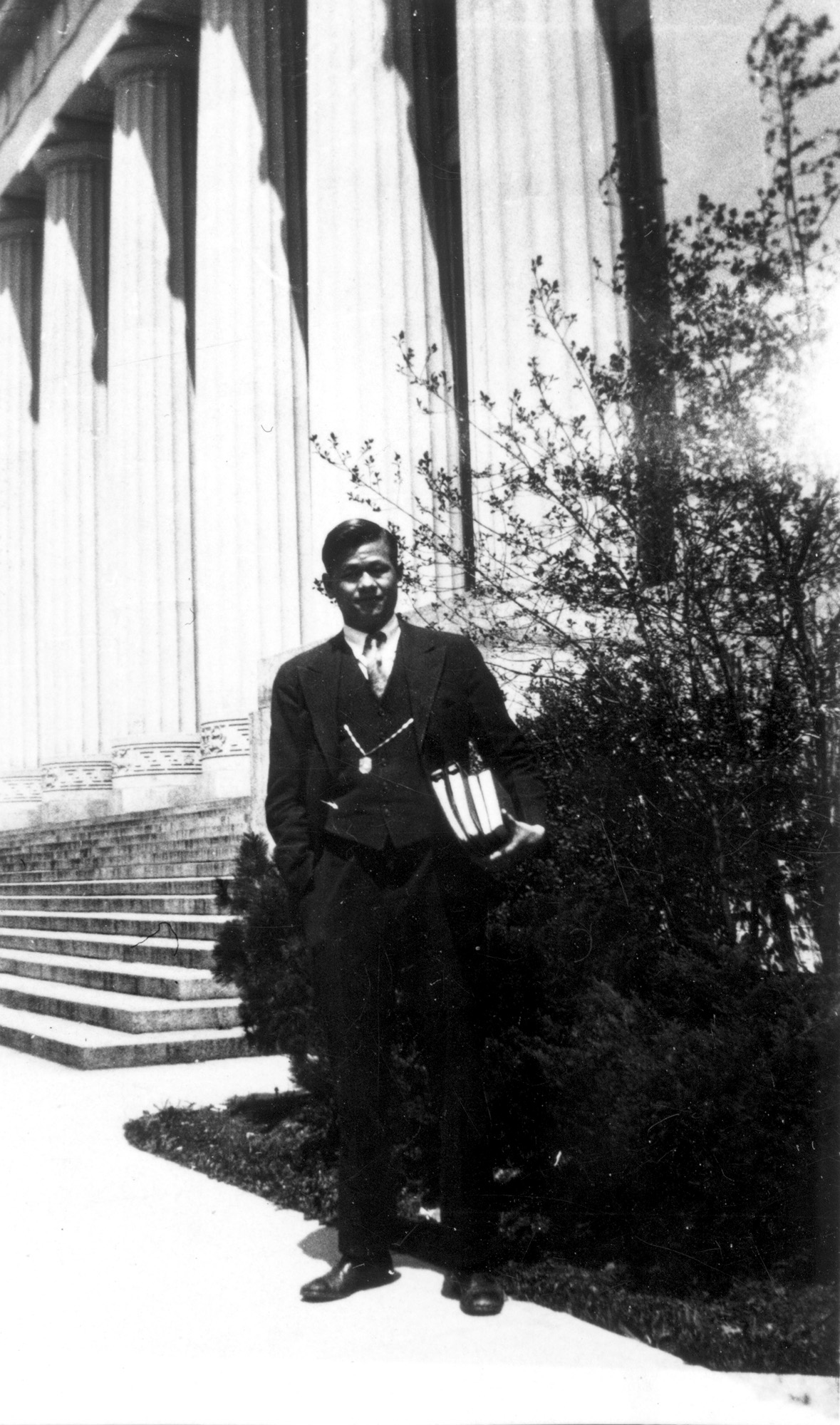
Dock Yip in front of Angell Hall, at the University of Michigan

In 1931, Yip graduated with a Bachelor of Science in Pharmacy from the University of Michigan. After completing his pharmacological studies, Yip returned to Vancouver where he became Secretary for the Chinese Consulate; it was during this period that Yip decided to pursue a career in law.

Yip, along with some of his brothers, were members of the Chinese Students Soccer Team in 1933, when they became the B.C. Mainland Cup Soccer Champions. The team is believed to be the only soccer team composed of Chinese players outside of China in that era, a time when Chinese people in B.C. faced heavy racism. In 2011, they were inducted into the B.C. Sports Hall of Fame.

In 1941 Yip earned his Bachelor of Arts from the University of British Columbia. Driven by the fact that British Columbia did not allow individuals of Chinese origin to practice law, Yip moved to Toronto with his future wife Victoria Chow upon the completed his studies at UBC.

In 1942 Yip joined the Canadian Army, becoming an army reservist with The Queen's Own Rifles of Canada.

== Law practice in Toronto ==
After three attempts to gain admittance into Osgoode Hall Law School, he was admitted and graduated in 1945 with his Bachelor of Laws. Later that year, he became the first lawyer of East Asian descent called to the bar in Canada. Yip, working closely with civil liberties and human rights lawyer and law school friend Irving Himel and other activists from across the country, was an important player in convincing the Government of Canada to, in 1947, repeal the Chinese Immigration Act of 1923, commonly known as the Chinese Exclusion Act, thereby allowing immigration of Chinese people into Canada. He remained focused on this issue, through 1958 to 1966 fighting to have Canada's immigration policies reformed to reduce the barriers Chinese immigrants faced trying to enter Canada. From his work, Yip became an important community leader in Toronto's Chinatown.

After achieving victory in his legal fight for Chinese-Canadian rights, Yip returned to his legal career serving Toronto's Chinese community. He maintained a private legal practice in Chinatown where he flourished, due to his fluency in three Chinese languages, the fact he was the only Chinese-speaking attorney in Toronto at the time, and because he was a man who "gave personal care and attention to his clients". Yip was highly respected by other lawyers, recognized as a person of integrity and role model; he was also fondly remembered as a man with an encyclopedic knowledge, as comfortable discussing classical literature as he was debating intricacies of law. In addition to his 47 years assisting Chinese residents with their legal needs, four decades of that spent working out of store-front offices in Chinatown, Yip served two terms as a Toronto Board of Education trustee for Ward 6 in the 1970s.

In 1985, he played the role of tong leader, Milton Bin, in the movie Year of the Dragon starring Mickey Rourke. In 1991, he appeared in a Cyndi Lauper rock video. Yip continued to practice law until retiring in 1992.

In 1994, at the age of 87, Yip received special recognition from Ryerson University as the oldest student in their continuing education program, studying Shakespearean English by correspondence. In 1998 he was awarded the Law Society Medal by the Law Society of Upper Canada for outstanding service to the legal profession.

== Personal life ==
In 1942, Yip married Victoria Chow, his childhood sweetheart. They had three children and five grandchildren.

== Awards ==
- Law Society of Upper Canada Medal 1998
