= Jacky Chou =

Canadian businessman

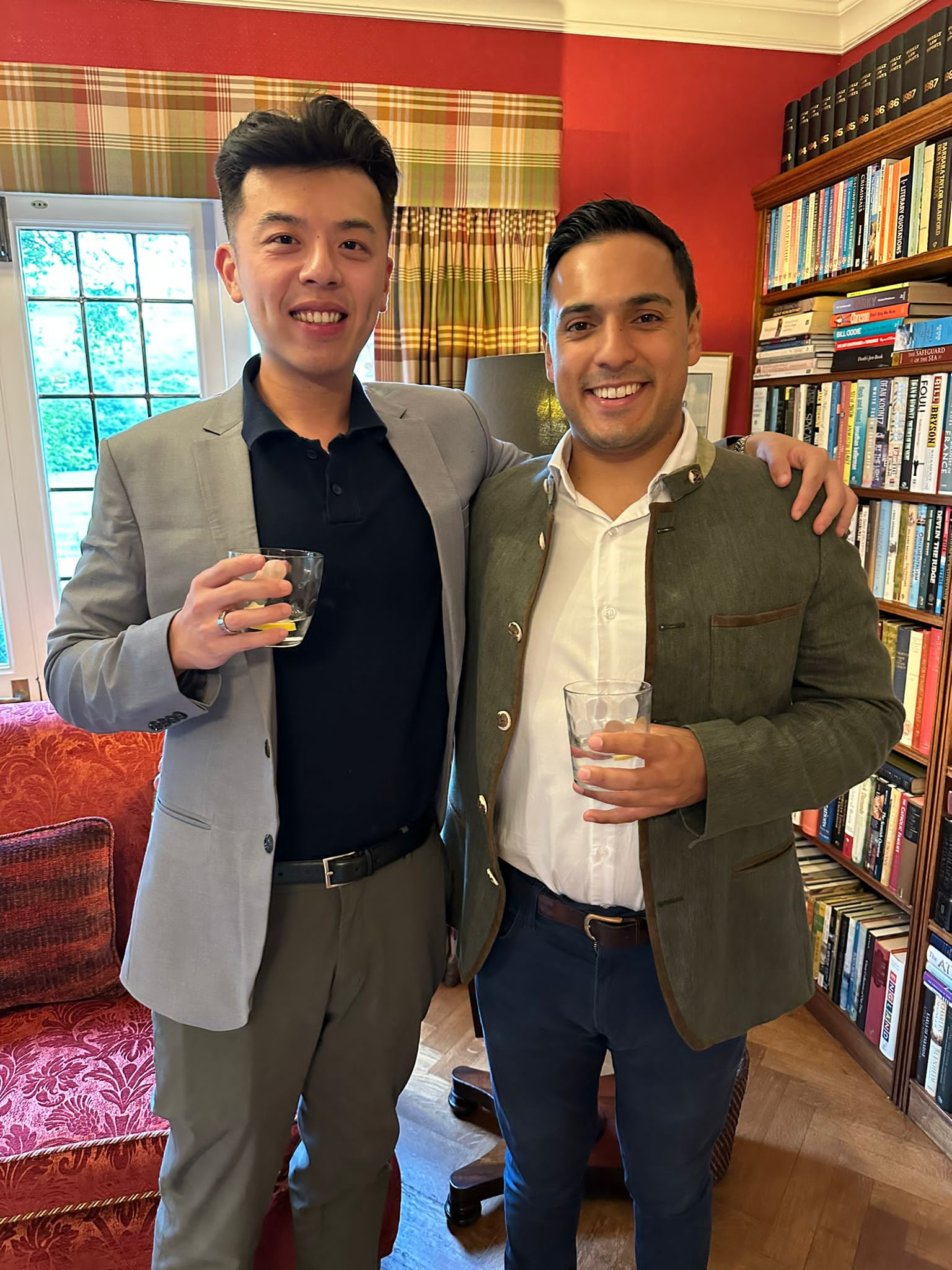
- Jacky Chou in 2023 (left)
- Born: January 20, 1992 (age 34)
- Education: University of British Columbia
- Occupations: Businessperson, digital marketer
- Years active: 2016 – present
- Website: jackychou.com

Jacky Chou is a Canadian businessman best known as the founder of Indexsy.

== Early life and education ==
Chou was born in Taiwan and grew up in Richmond, British Columbia. Born around 1992 and raised in Vancouver, BC, he attended the University of British Columbia, earning a Bachelor of Applied Science in Electrical Engineering.

== Career ==
After determining he did not want to work in electrical engineering, Chou founded Indexsy in Vancouver in 2015. Indexsy acquires digital properties, then uses marketing with the intent of increasing their value. From June to December in 2016, Chou worked at Kontakt.io as a "traffic acquisition manager". He then worked around a year at the photography startup EyeEm.

Chou founded a business with Albert Liu, sold it in January for an undisclosed amount, and in 2019, the two founded Far & Away, a minimalist kitchenware brand. They acquired the domain of the defunct e-design company Laurel & Wolf in 2020. Chou and Albert Liu purchased the domain for $3,500, hired designers to update the website, and relaunched within two weeks, apparently learning the history of the brand after the fact.

In April 2020, he launched TowingLess, and began managing the company full-time until July 2022.
