= Caleb Chan =

Hong Kong–born Canadian businessman and philanthropist

- Education: UC Berkeley (BS); University of San Francisco (M.B.A.)
- Occupations: Chairman and chief executive officer of the International Land Group in San Francisco and of Burrard International Holdings.
- Parent: Chan Shun 1917–1997 (father)
- Relatives: Tom Chan (brother)

Caleb Chan is a Hong Kong-born Canadian businessman and philanthropist. He is the chairman and chief executive officer of the International Land Group in San Francisco and of Burrard International Holdings in Vancouver.

== Biography ==
In 1989, Chan immigrated to Vancouver, British Columbia with his father Chan Shun, the founder of the Crocodile Garments Ltd., a Hong Kong garment and textile firm. This firm was later sold to Hong Kong tycoon, Lim Por Yen. Chan graduated with a bachelor's degree in Business Administration from UC Berkeley and holds an MBA from the University of San Francisco.

Chan made his foray into the business world by overseeing Burrard International Inc. the parent company of GolfBC, which controls six golf courses in B.C. and three in Hawaii. He also made a name in real estate development first by acquiring a property in Kelowna and since then amassed a multimillion-dollar fortune from various real estate development ventures.

== Boards ==
- Member of the advisory board of the Asia America Initiative
- Member of the Fine Arts Museum of San Francisco and the Land Planning Committee of the Loma Linda University Development Corporation.
- Former member of the BC Housing Management Commission Advisory Board.
- Former Trustee and Member of Investment Committee of SilverBirch Hotels & Resorts.
- Former Trustee of Hot House Growers Income Fund.

Chan also serves as an Executive Director of Burrard International Holdings, Inc since its founding. He has been a director of HSBC Bank Canada and HSBC Canada Asset Trust since July 2006. He also serves as a director of UBC Properties Trust, Belkorp Industries Inc. and BC Children's Hospital Foundation.

== Philanthropy ==
An ardent philanthropist, Chan is also known for sharing his wealth. The University of British Columbia's Chan Centre for the Performing Arts was largely funded by a $10-million gift from the Chan Foundation of Canada. The centre's Chan Shun Concert Hall is named in honour of his father. Since the late 1970s, Mr. Chan has devoted enormous amounts of time and energy to the philanthropic works of the Chan Shun Foundation. His father's foundation was originally set up to fund educational, medical and missionary work of the Seventh-day Adventist Church. He has donated millions of dollars to hospitals as well as two senior citizen homes in Hong Kong, scholarships at various higher education institutions such as Loma Linda University and the Hong Kong Adventist College Foundation.

== Wealth ==
In 2007, Canadian Business pegged his wealth at $788 million. In 2008, Asian Canadian Network Magazine estimated his and his family's wealth at 761 million. In 2009, Chan along his brother Jonathan were worth over CAD940 million and have consistently been ranked among the 100 richest in the Canadian Business.

As of 2011, Chan and his brother are ranked 63 of the 100 richest people in Canada with an estimated net worth of $980 million.

== Awards and recognitions ==
Chan has been honoured with an honorary Doctor of Laws from the University of British Columbia for his philanthropic work.
