= Brian Wong =

Canadian entrepreneur (born 1991)

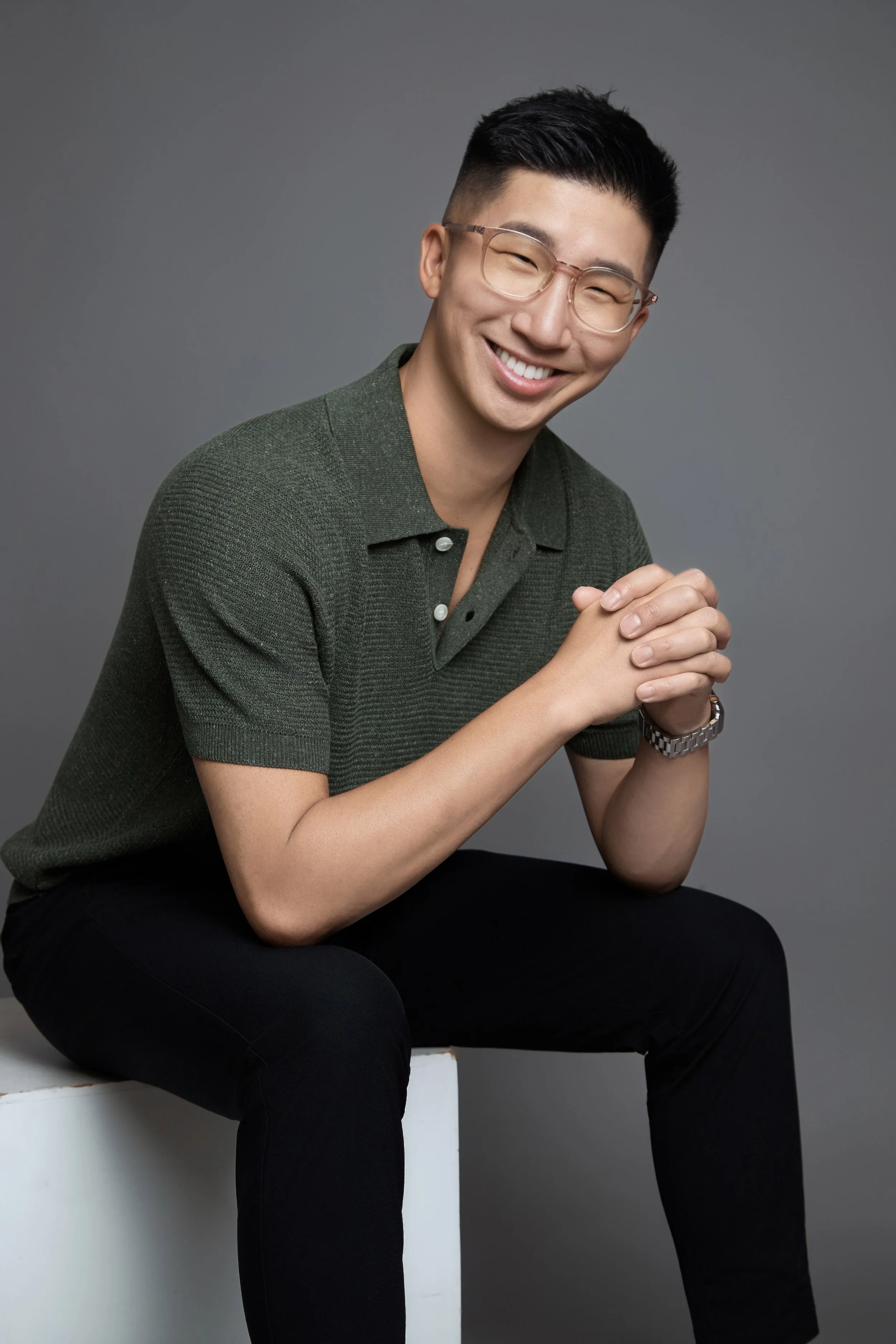
- Brian Wong c. 2026
- Born: April 14, 1991 (age 35)
- Occupations: Founder and former CEO of Kiip
- Brian Wong introducing himself recorded April 2015

Brian Wong (born April 14, 1991) is a Canadian Internet entrepreneur. In 2010, Wong co-founded Kiip (pronounced "keep"), a company offering a mobile app rewards platform through which computer game players would receive real-world rewards from brands and companies for in-game achievements.

== Early life and education ==
Wong was born and raised in Vancouver, British Columbia, to parents of Hong Kong descent. His father was an accountant and his mother was a nurse. He received his high school diploma at the age of 14, after twice skipping two grades at the University Transition Program at the University of British Columbia (UBC). Wong received a bachelor's degree from UBC at the age of 18. While at university, Wong launched his first company, FollowFormation, which Mashable called "the easiest way to follow the top Twitterers by subject matter or topic." One of his most recent ventures, Kiip, made him one of the youngest internet entrepreneurs to raise venture capital.

In 2010, Wong worked in business development for the news aggregator Digg, leading the development and release of the Digg Android Mobile App. Soon after a joining and after a disastrous redesign, Digg had a round of corporate layoffs. Wong was let go after five months, an experience that eventually led to him opening his own business.

== Kiip ==
Wong received the initial inspiration for Kiip on an airplane at age 19 as he observed his fellow passengers interacting with their iPads. He noticed that many passengers were playing games, and felt that the games' advertisements took up screen space without adding any real value. Because he perceived that games are a "holy grail of achievement", Wong wanted to leverage key moments of achievement—such as level ups and high scores—with a targeted, relevant rewards program that enabled brands to reach consumers when they were most engaged.

In July 2010, Wong teamed with his fellow former Digg employees Courtney Guertin and their mutual friend Amadeus Demarzi to found Kiip. As of 2017, Kiip was sending achievement-based rewards such as coupons to 100 million consumers per month, and had raised more than $32 million of venture capital from various sources, including Relay Ventures, Hummer Winblad Venture Partners, True Ventures, Verizon Ventures, and Crosslink Capital. Kiip has offices in San Francisco, New York City, Los Angeles, Chicago, Tokyo and London. The company established strategic partnerships with more than 40 major brands, including 1-800-Flowers, Amazon.com, American Apparel, Best Buy, Carl's Jr., Disney, Dr. Pepper, GNC, KY Jelly, Pepsi, Playboy, Popchips, Sephora, Victoria's Secret, and Vitamin Water. Kiip was on track to do more than $20 million in revenue in 2017.

== Recognitions ==
In 2010, Wong became one of the youngest company leaders to ever receive funding from a venture capital firm. He was called a self-made millionaire by the time he was 20 years old. By 2012 he had spoken at several popular conferences, including TEDx and South by Southwest. Wong and Kiip were profiled in such global publications such as Forbes, Entrepreneur, The Wall Street Journal, The New York Times, and Inc. Magazine, and he was on the cover of the September 2014 issue of Entrepreneur as one of the young millionaires changing the world. Wong was named in the Forbes 30 Under 30 Social/Mobile list in 2011.

== Publications ==
Wong is the author of The Cheat Code: Going Off Script to Get More, Go Faster, and Shortcut Your Way to Success, a book that is "aimed at helping young people just starting their careers". It was published in September 2016.
