= Tina Lee =

Canadian business executive

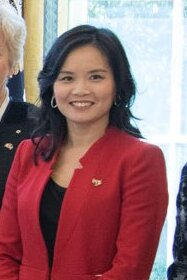
Lee in 2017

Tina Lee (Chinese: 李佩婷) is a Canadian executive who is the current CEO of T&T Supermarket, the largest Canadian grocery retail chain that sells Asian goods. She took over from her mother, Cindy, in 2014. T&T is named after Lee and her sister, Tiffany. Lee's parents immigrated to Canada from Taiwan.

Lee is a senior advisory board member for NAAAP Toronto. She has also been named to the United States-Canada Council for the Advancement of Women Entrepreneurs and Business Leaders. She was a co-recipient, along with her mother, of the Canadian Grand Prix Trailblazer Lifetime Achievement Award. Lee was also named Executive of the Year at Ascend Canada’s fifth annual Leadership Awards Gala.
