= Sunny Tang =

Chinese-Canadian martial artist

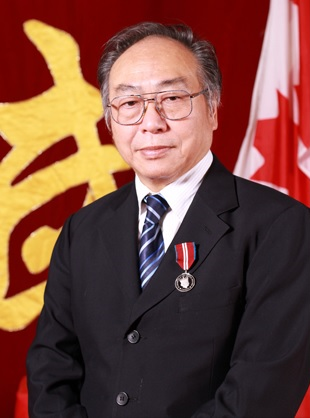
- Born: September 3, 1946 (age 80); Hong Kong
- Education: Tutelage under Ip Man and Moy Yat
- Occupation: Martial Arts Instructor
- Known for: Coach for Team Canada for the Pan American Championships and Wushu World Championships
- Awards: 2004 Gold Medal at the World Traditional Masters competition, China; Queen Elizabeth II Diamond Jubilee Medal; Canadian Martial Arts Hall of Fame

Sunny Tang is a Canadian practitioner of wing chun kung fu and wushu. He was the 2003 World Traditional Masters champion and is the founder of Wushu Canada, as well as the Sunny Tang Martial Arts Centre chain of martial arts centres in Canada. He is a recipient of the Queen Elizabeth II Diamond Jubilee Medal and an inductee into the Canadian Martial Arts Hall of Fame.

== Early life ==
Sunny Tang was born in Hong Kong on September 3, 1946. In 1960 Tang began his training under Ip Man and Moy Yat in his home city. He is a practitioner and teacher of both wing chun kung fu and modern wushu. He died on October 5, 2026.

== Career ==
Tang emigrated to England in 1971 to open a Wing Chun school in Worcester. He then moved to Toronto in 1973, where he was one of the first practitioners of wing chun in the country, opening the Sunny Tang Martial Arts Centre. The business became a chain, numbering ten centres across Canada. In 1993 Tang founded Wushu Canada, the official national federation representing Canada to the International Wushu Federation. Tang was also the team leader of Team Canada for the Pan American Wushu Championships in both 1996 and 1998, as well as the World Wushu Championships in 1995 and 2003.

In 2003 Sunny Tang won the gold medal at the World Traditional Masters competition in China. In 2009, he was then the organizer of the 10th World Wushu International Championships in Toronto. Today, Tang is a board member of the International Executive Board of the International Wushu Federation, President of Wushu Canada, and the President of the International Moy Yat Wing Chun Federation.

== Books ==
- Pah Chum Do of Wing Chun Kung Fu (1986)
- Pah Chun Do of Wing Chun (1986)
- Wing Chun for Young Ladies (1986)
- Advanced Wing Chun Kung Fu (1991)
- Wing Chun Chi Sau/Bui Chee (1993)

== Recognition ==
In 1989 a video interview with Tang about Chinese-Canadian culture was included in the collection of the Canadian Museum of History. He then received the Canada Day Achievement Award in 1990, and performed before Queen Elizabeth II in 1992 on the occasion of Canada’s 125th Anniversary. Tang received the Queen Elizabeth II Diamond Jubilee Medal in 2012 and in 2016, he was inducted into the Canadian Martial Arts Hall of Fame. Tang has also appeared on the cover of Wing Chun Illustrated.
