= Cindy Lee (businesswoman) =

Canadian businesswoman

Cindy Lee is a Canadian businesswoman who founded T&T Supermarket, the largest retail grocery chain in Canada that sells Asian foodstuffs. She became president and CEO in 1993. Lee retired as CEO in 2014 and was succeeded by her daughter, Tina Lee. Lee sits on T&T Supermarkets' board of directors. Her other daughter, Tiffany Shao-Chin Lee, is corporate counsel for online grocer Thrive Market in Los Angeles, California.

== Biography ==
Lee was born in Taiwan, one of eight children in a family of entrepreneurs. She studied accounting at the National Chengchi University in Taiwan and immigrated to Canada in 1976. She worked as a bookkeeper, and has been married to her husband Jack Lee since 1978. They have three children.
