= T&T Supermarket =

Canadian supermarket chain

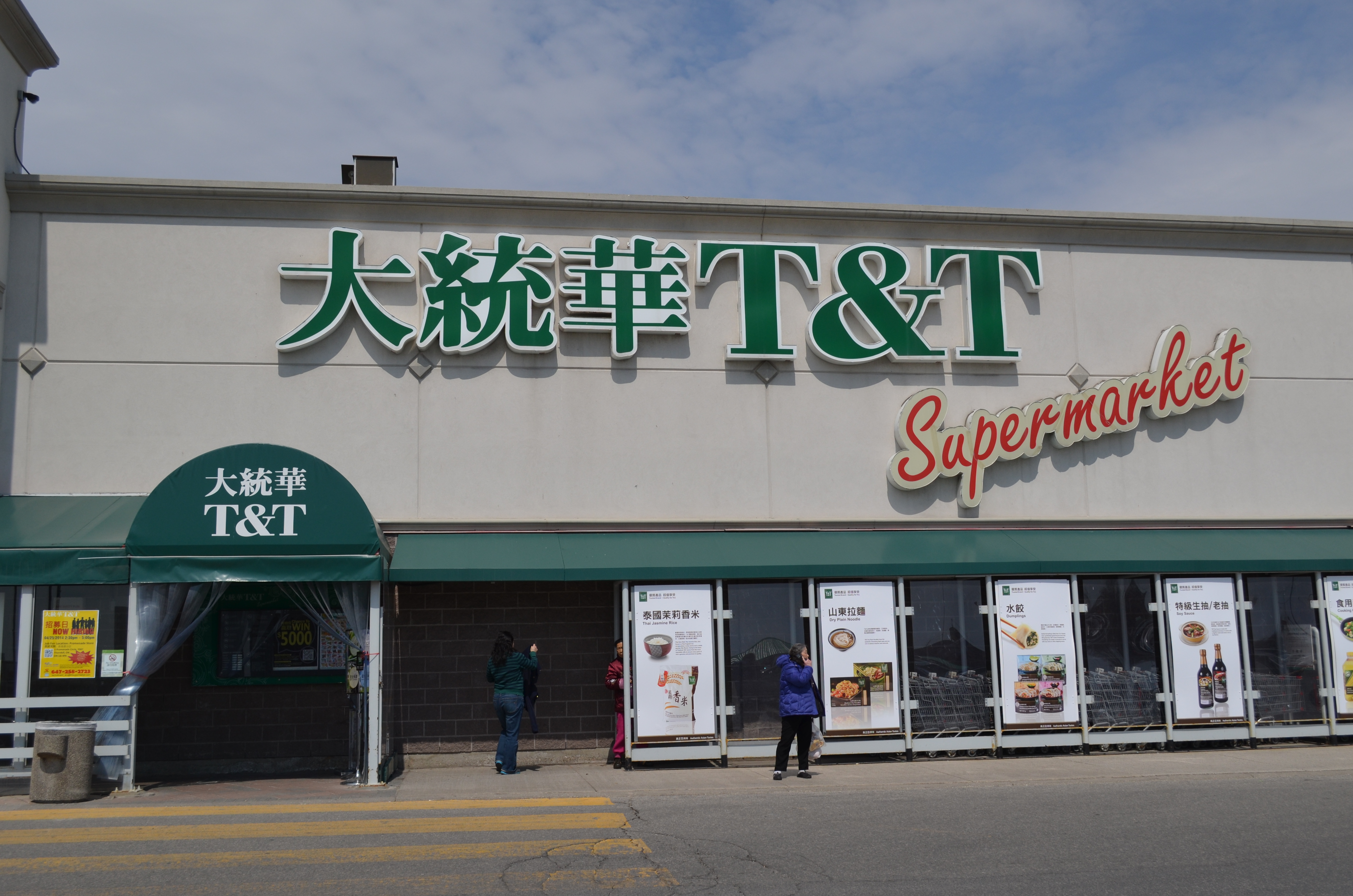
- T&T Supermarket in Markham, Ontario
- Type: Subsidiary
- Industry: Retail
- Founded: 1993; 33 years ago in Burnaby, British Columbia, Canada
- Founder: Cindy Lee
- Headquarters: Richmond, British Columbia, Canada
- Number of locations: 38 stores (2025)
- Areas served: Canada; (Alberta; British Columbia; Ontario; Quebec) United States; (California; Washington)
- Key people: Tina Lee (CEO)
- Products: Grocery
- Parent: Loblaw Companies

Chinese name
- Traditional Chinese: 大統華超市
- Simplified Chinese: 大统华超市
- Literal meaning: Big United China (Note: As provided in the Canadian trademark registration for 'Da Tung Hua'. The Chinese name is derived from the Chinese names of 99 Ranch Market (大華超級市場) and Uni-President Enterprises Corporation (統一企業公司).) Supermarket
Transcriptions
Standard Mandarin
- Hanyu Pinyin: dà tǒng huá chāoshì
- Website: www.tntsupermarket.com

T&T Supermarket (Chinese: 大統華超市) is a Canadian Asian supermarket chain headquartered in Richmond, British Columbia. It was founded in Vancouver in 1993 by Jack and Cindy Lee. Cindy's eldest daughter, Tina Lee, succeeded her mother as the company's CEO in 2014. In 2009, T&T Supermarket was acquired by Loblaw Companies Limited.

T&T is the largest Asian supermarket chain in Canada, operating 38 locations across British Columbia, Alberta, Ontario, and Quebec, and it has three locations in the United States. The stores range in size from 35,000 sq ft (3,300 m^{2}) to 75,000 sq ft (7,000 m^{2}). In addition to the many departments found in a regular supermarket, most T&T stores also feature produce, meat, seafood, baked goods, kitchenware, gifts, specialty items from various Asian cuisines, a hot food bar, a dim sum counter, a sushi counter, and a Hong Kong-style Chinese barbecue. In 2020, they launched an online shopping platform and an app. In 2024, T&T Supermarket opened its first U.S. store, in Bellevue, Washington.

"T&T" is a reference to Cindy Lee's eldest daughters, Tina and Tiffany, as well as the initials of two founding investors: the California-based Tawa Supermarket Inc. and the Taiwan-based Tung Yee Uni-President Enterprises Corp.

== History ==
=== Establishment ===
The Taiwanese-Canadian businesswoman Cindy Lee opened her first store in Burnaby, British Columbia, in 1993.

=== Acquisition by Loblaw ===
T&T was purchased by Loblaw Companies in July 2009 for $225 million in consideration, consisting of $191 million in cash and $34 million in preferred shares.

=== Unionization in Ontario ===
The United Food and Commercial Workers filed an application for certification with the Ontario Labour Relations Board in July 2012, and workers at a T&T Supermarket warehouse in Scarborough held a secret ballot vote for unionization the same month.

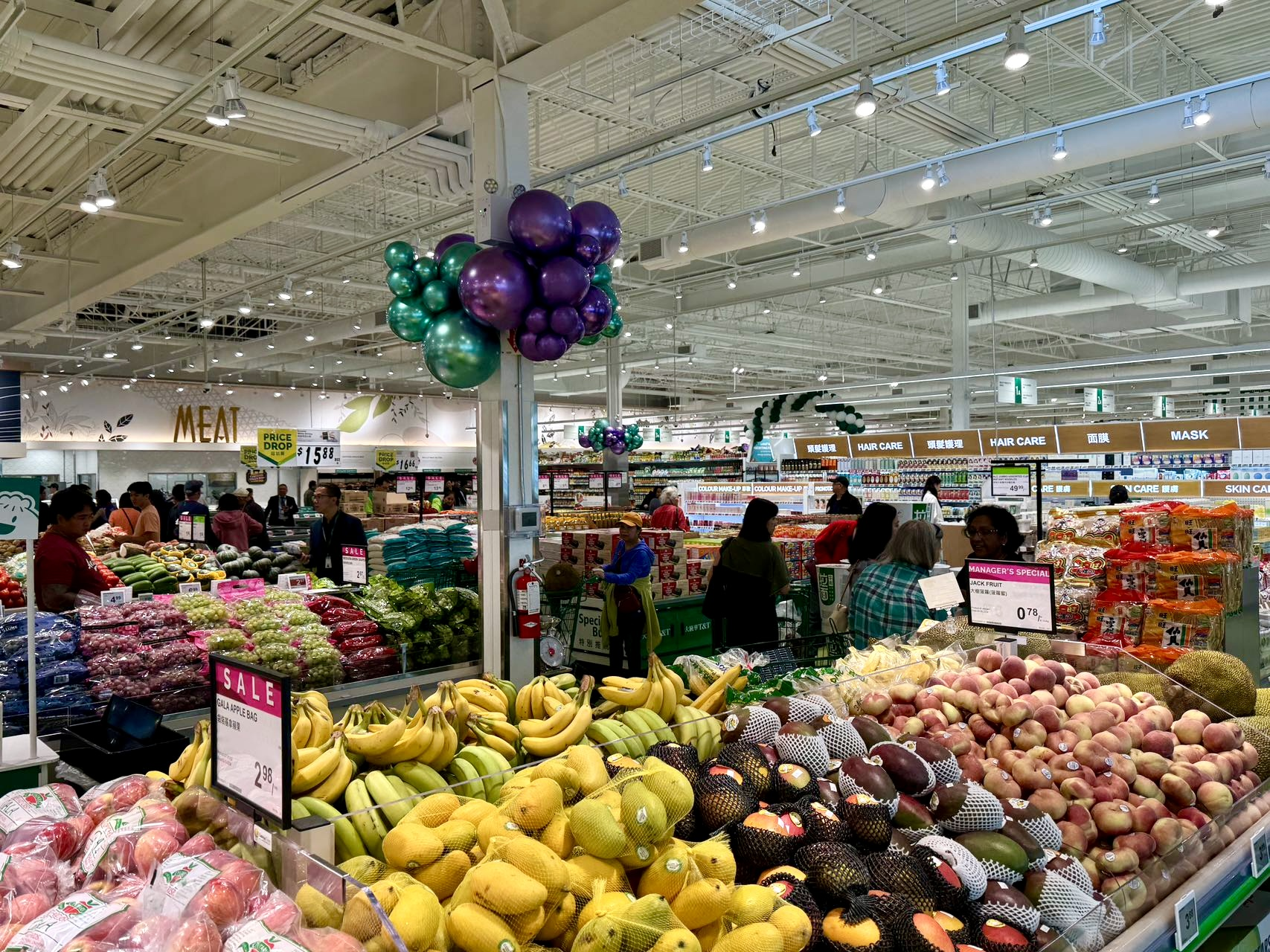
The interior of a T&T Supermarket in 2024

=== Development of largest T&T store and e-commerce platform ===
In 2018, T&T opened a 70,000-square-foot (6,500 m^{2}) flagship store in Richmond, BC, which was the first to have a live seafood bar, an Asian street food station, and self-checkouts. Industry experts dubbed the store a "grocerant" because of its restaurant-style offerings.

In 2020, T&T launched its e-commerce platform, facilitating online orders and delivery across all Canadian provinces.

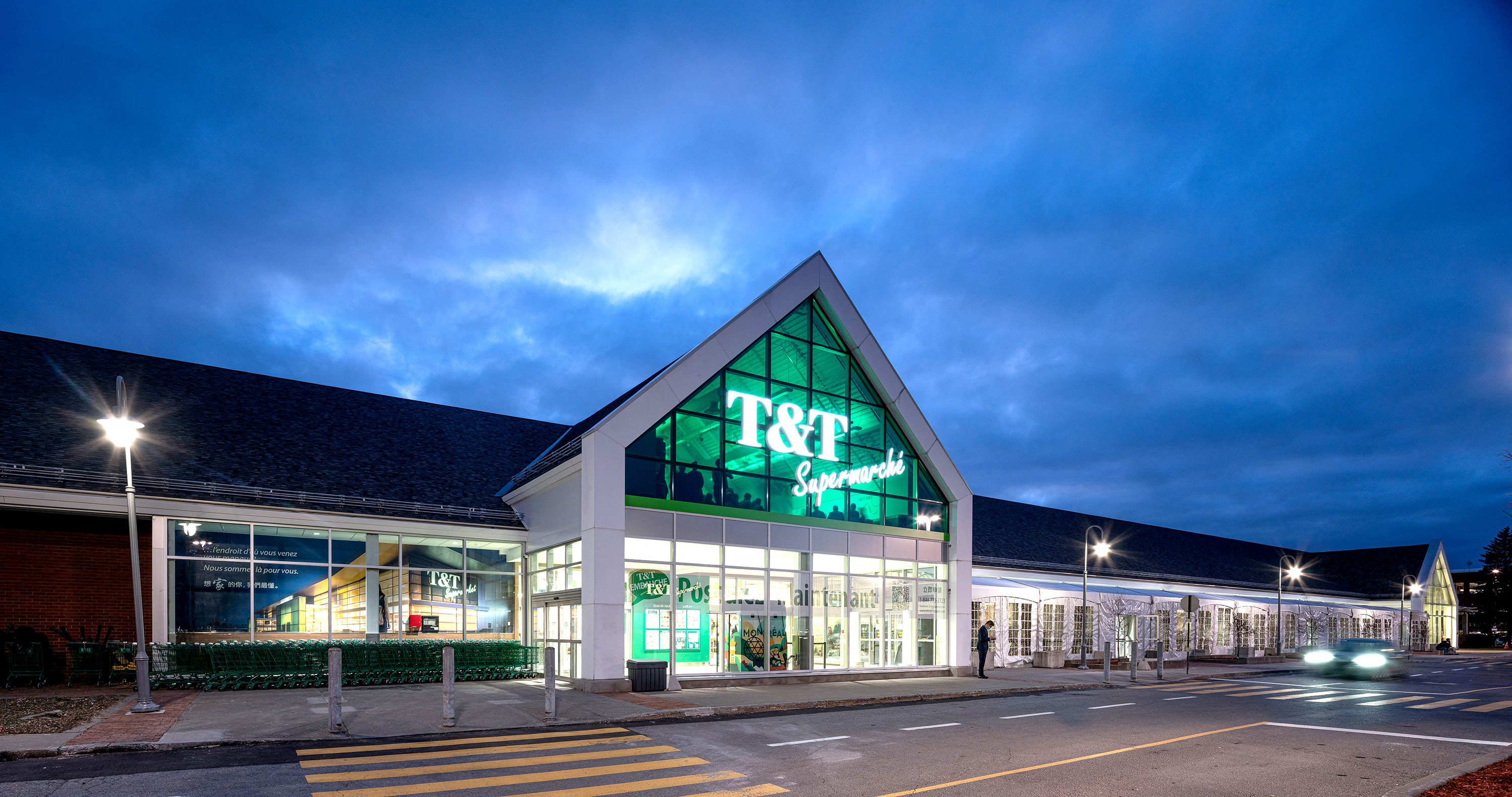
The first T&T Supermarket supercenter, in a former Loblaws outlet in Saint-Laurent, Montreal, Quebec

In 2022, an even larger outlet of 70,000 square feet (6,500 m^{2}) was opened in Saint-Laurent, Montreal, Quebec.

=== Expansion into the United States ===
In 2024, T&T Supermarket opened its first American location, in Factoria, Bellevue, Washington. Spanning 76,000 square feet (7,100 m^{2}), it was the largest Asian grocery store in Washington state at the time.

A 30,000-square-foot (2,800 m^{2}) Lynwood, Washington location opened in the Lynnwood Crossroads center in November 2025.

In 2026, T&T opened a store in San Jose, California, marking its debut in the state.

== See also ==
- List of supermarket chains in Canada
