= DP World =

Emirati multinational logistics company

Coordinates: 24°59′N 55°05′E

DP World موانئ دبي العالمية
- Type: State owned Enterprise
- Industry: Logistics
- Founded: 2005; 21 years ago
- Headquarters: Dubai, United Arab Emirates
- Key people: Yuvraj Narayan (Group CEO); Essa Kazim (Chairman of Board of Directors)
- Products: Logistics services, port services, marine services, freezones
- Revenue: ▲US$24.4 billion (2025)
- Operating income: ▲US$6.4 billion (2025)
- Net income: ▲US$1.96 billion (2025)
- Number of employees: 101,440
- Website: dpworld.com

DP World is an Emirati multinational logistics company based in Dubai, United Arab Emirates. It specialises in cargo logistics, port terminal operations, maritime services and free trade zones. Formed in 2005 by the merger of Dubai Ports Authority and Dubai Ports International, DP World handles 70 million containers that are brought in by around 70,000 vessels annually. This equates to roughly 10% of global container traffic accounted for by their 82 marine and inland terminals present in over 40 countries. Until 2016, DP World was primarily a global port operator, but since then, it has acquired other companies up and down the value chain.

Sultan Ahmed bin Sulayem became chairman of DP World in 2007. He has been credited with transforming DP World from a regional ports operator into a global logistics firm. Sulayem resigned from DP World in 2026 after it came to light that Sulayem had an extensive relationship with disgraced child sex offender Jeffrey Epstein.

== History ==
=== Early history ===
Dubai Ports International (DPI) was founded in 1999. Its first project was at Jeddah, Saudi Arabia, collaborating with a local partner on the South Container Terminal (SCT). DPI then began operations at the ports of Djibouti in 2000, Vizag, India in 2002 and Constanța, Romania in 2003. In January 2005, DPI acquired CSX World Terminals (CSX WT). In September 2005 Dubai Ports International officially merged with the Dubai Ports Authority to form DP World. The rapid expansion through acquisition continued in March 2006 when DP World purchased the fourth largest ports operator in the world, P&O, for £3.9 billion.

P&O operated major US port facilities in New York, New Jersey, Philadelphia, Baltimore, New Orleans, and Miami. Before the deal was secured, the arrangement was reviewed by the Committee on Foreign Investment in the United States headed by the US Treasury Department and including the Departments of State, Commerce, and Homeland Security. It was given the green light, but soon after, both Democratic and Republican members of Congress expressed concern over the potential negative impact the deal would have on port security.

On 22 February 2006, President George W. Bush threatened to veto any legislation passed by Congress to block the deal, which would be the first time in his presidency he would exercise the privilege. In a statement to reporters, Bush claimed, "It would send a terrible signal to friends and allies not to let this transaction go through." On 23 February 2006, DP World volunteered to postpone its takeover of significant operations at the seaports and on 9 March 2006, it said that it would transfer its operations of American ports to a "US entity".

The United States House of Representatives held a vote on 16 March 2006 on legislation that would have blocked the DP World deal, with 348 members voting for blocking the deal, and 71 voting against. DP World later sold P&O's American operations to American International Group's asset management division, Global Investment Group for an undisclosed sum.

In August 2006, DP World signed an agreement with the Port Qasim Authority, to invest in a new container terminal at Port Muhammad Qasim near Karachi and announced that it was in discussions with the Pakistani Government about the development of a container terminal at Gwadar in Balochistan. DP World had been favourite to win the Gwadar concession, but withdrew from the bidding. Gwadar Port was subsequently awarded to PSA (Port of Singapore Authority) and opened in March 2007.

=== 2006: US Port security ===
The ownership of various US ports by DP World (which had been acquired as part of the P&O deal) was seen as controversial by many in the United States even though it was supported by the US president George W. Bush; the US ports were sold shortly afterwards.

=== 2022: UK mass redundancy ===
On 17 March 2022, P&O Ferries sacked its entire British work force and abruptly suspended its operations, cancelling all sailings and offloading passengers and cargo. Eight hundred UK staff were told in a video call that their employment was "terminated with immediate effect due to redundancy", and that their work would in future be undertaken by staff contracted to a third-party supplier. A spokesman for the National Union of Rail, Maritime and Transport Workers said that there had been no consultation with the staff or trade unions. Staff on some ferries refused to leave their vessels. Some replacement staff, unaware of the circumstances or location of their deployment, declined to work, and a recruitment agency who supplied replacement staff said that they were unaware of the plans.

The method of the expulsion, overseen by ex-military security guards, has been criticised by government and business leaders, and Mark Russell, a non-executive director of DP World, resigned afterwards in disagreement. P&O Ferries had recently seen losses during the COVID-19 pandemic as well as deficits in its pension fund. Industry sources have also cited its high overheads and competition from Irish Ferries as contributory factors. Verity Slater, expert in maritime employment law at Stephens Scown, commented that P&O may not have to follow UK employment laws, since some of its ships are not registered in Britain.

=== Recent history ===
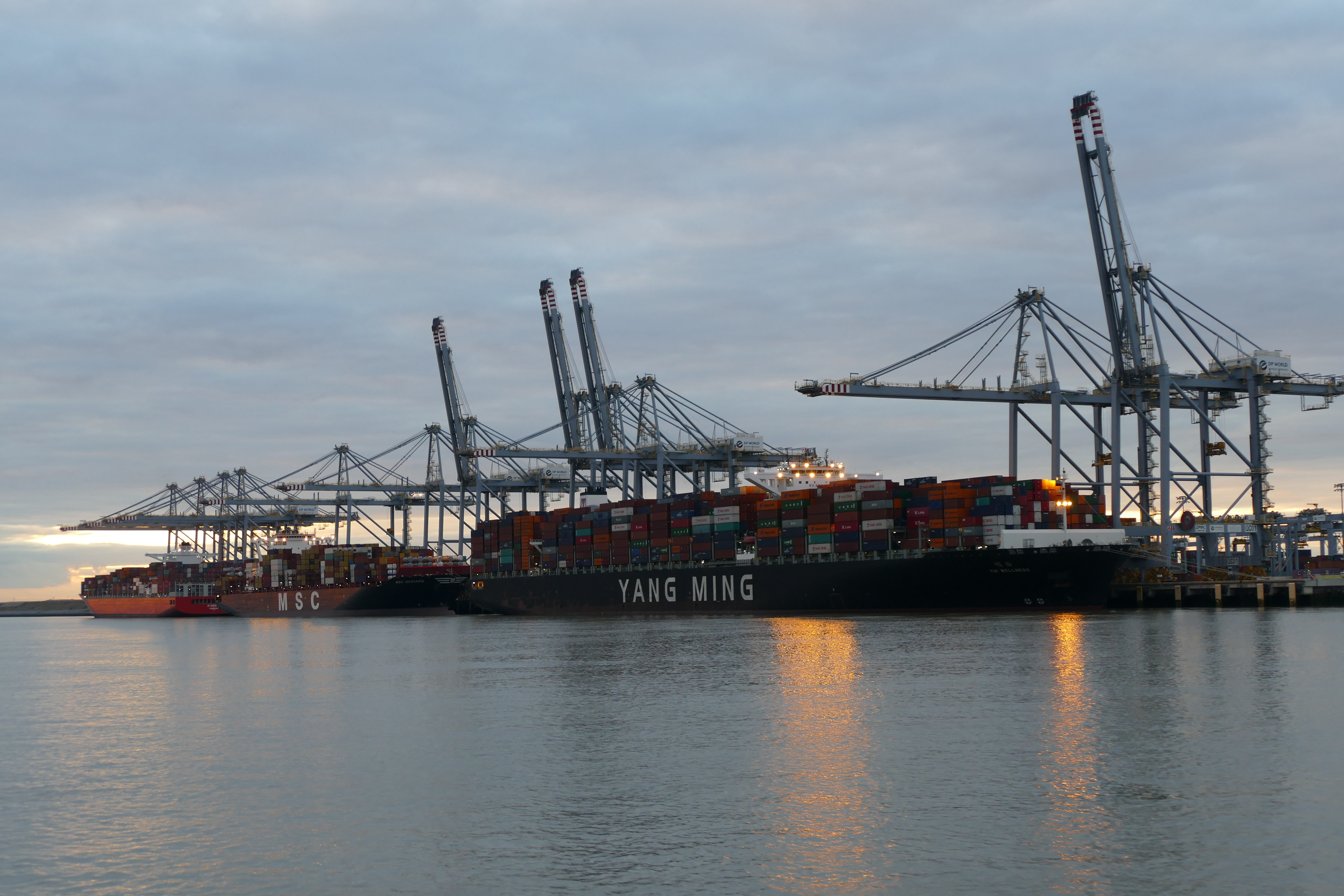
London Gateway is a deepwater port and logistics park in the UK, wholly owned and operated by DP World

In June 2007 the company raised $3.25 billion in Islamic and conventional bond sales to refinance existing debt and fund expansion and issued 3.818 billion shares, representing 20% of the company on the NASDAQ Dubai stock exchange in November 2007 in what was the Middle East's largest initial public offering (IPO) which raised 4.96 billion dollars.

By 2008 the company was handing 46.8 million TEU worldwide, up 8% on 2007, with expansion and development projects in India, China, the Middle East, and elsewhere. Capacity was expected to rise to around 95 million TEU over the next ten years.

In December 2009 Moody's downgraded DP World's financial status to junk after the Dubai 2009 debt standstill.

In the second quarter of 2010 DP World gave the go-ahead for construction of the £1.5 billion London Gateway port. Work started in February 2010 with the port due to open in the fourth quarter of 2013. By April 2011, Moody's upgraded DP World's financial status to 'investment grade'. Since December 2010, DP World has undertaken a series of asset disposals, exiting markets where it does not have a significant presence and seeking to redeploy funds in fast-growing markets.

On 20 February 2019, DP World announced it had repurchased P&O Ferries from Dubai World in a £322m deal.

In June 2019 DP World signed agreements with the Russian Direct Investment Fund, ROSATOM, and Norilsk Nickel aiming to develop the Northern Sea Route.

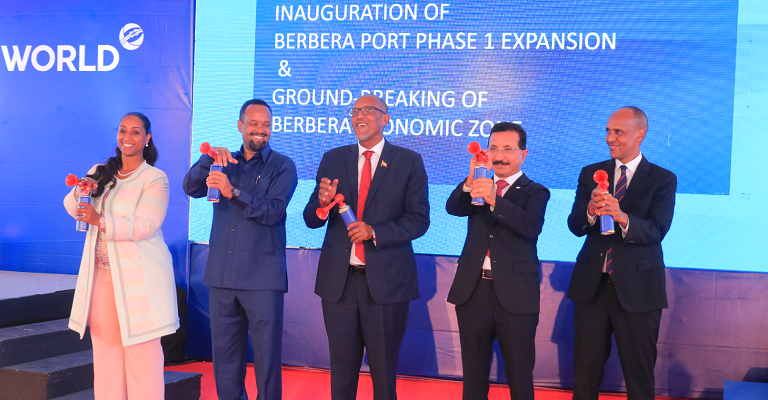
DP World CEO Sultan Ahmed bin Sulayem and Somaliland's President Muse Bihi Abdi in July 2021

In March 2021, the company said that, due to the COVID-19 pandemic, it had witnessed a drop of its profits by 29% comparing to 2019. In May of the same year, Abdulla Bin Damithan was appointed as CEO and managing director of UAE business. In October, coinciding with the launch of Expo 2020, DP World unveiled its new corporate identity. DP World is an official premier partner of Expo 2020.

In March 2023, sold its shares in Le Havre terminals and consolidate its operations in Marseille-Fos Port by maintaining a 50:50 ownership.

In November 2023, a cyberattack on DP World paralysed imports and exports in Australia for several days. DP World accounts for about 40% of Australia's imports and exports, leading to a 30,000-container backlog; additionally, data was stolen.

On 14 October 2024, DP World announced a £1 billion expansion plan of the London Gateway port at the London investment summit, despite criticism from the UK ministers. The investment was previously under review, after Louise Haigh called DP World's subsidiary, P&O Ferries, a "rogue operator" for sacking 800 seafarers in March 2022. She had also urged consumers to boycott the company. Offended by Haigh's comments, DP World had threatened to pull out of the investment summit. However, Sultan Ahmed bin Sulayem later confirmed to attend the summit and for the investment to go ahead as planned. On 27 October, Ukraine's Oleksandr Merezhko condemned DP World's cooperation with Moscow, referring to Russian involvement in Ukraine war. He urged the UK ministers to cut ties with the firm due to its controversial business deals with Rosatom.

In March 2025, works started on the expansion on London Gateway to make it the UK's largest container port.

In May 2025, DP World announced a plan to invest US $2.5 billion in major logistics and port infrastructure projects across India, Africa, South America, and Europe to enlarge supply chain capabilities. In India, a $510 million terminal at Tuna Tekra, Gujarat, featuring a 1.1 km quay and annual capacity of 2.19 million TEUs. In Europe, investments include the ongoing expansion of London Gateway, and new developments in South America.

In 2026, Chairman and CEO Sultan Ahmed bin Sulayem announced his resignation from the company due to his relationship with Jeffrey Epstein. Multiple companies had announced that they would stop working with DP World amid reporting on Sulayem's extensive ties to Epstein.

In July 2026, the Maritime Union of Australia called for a 28-hour working week without reduction in pay during negotiations over DP World's increasing use of artificial intelligence and automation at its Australian container terminals which, according to a study commissioned by the union, could affect up to 1,000 dock and maintenance jobs.

On 9 October 2026, DP World signed a deal with Chittagong Port Authority of Bangladesh to operate its New Mooring Container Terminal (NCT) for 15 years. The decision was protested by labour groups of Chittagong port and several rights groups of Bangladesh claiming it as a threat to national security and sovereignty.

== Location of DP World's operations ==
DP World's portfolio – as of 1 March 2019

Container terminals
Non-container terminals

New developments and major expansions

DP World has a portfolio of 78 operating marine and inland terminals supported by over 50 related businesses in 40 countries across six continents.

The table below lists current terminals and new developments managed by DP World.

City	Country	Port (Terminal)	Type
Algiers	Algeria	El Djazair Port (DP World Djazair)	Container Terminal
Antwerp	Belgium	Port of Antwerp (Antwerp Gateway)	Container Terminal
Antwerp	Belgium	Port of Antwerp (Beverdonk Container Terminal)	Container Terminal
Chittagong	Bangladesh	Chittagong Port (New Mooring Container Terminal)	Container Terminal
Batangas	Philippines	Batangas International Port (ATI Batangas)	Container Terminal
Berbera	Somaliland	Port of Berbera (DP World Berbera New Port)	New Development and Major Expansion
Brisbane	Australia	Port of Brisbane (DP World Brisbane)	Container Terminal
Buenos Aires	Argentina	Port of Buenos Aires (Terminales Rio de la Plata)	Container Terminal
Callao	Peru	Port of Callao (DP World Callao)	Container Terminal
Cape Town	South Africa	Port of Cape Town (DP World Cargo Services – Cape Town)	Non-Container Terminal
Caucedo	Dominican Republic	Multimodal Caucedo Port (DP World Caucedo)	Container Terminal
Chennai	India	Chennai Port (DP World Chennai)	Container Terminal
Constanța	Romania	Port of Constanța (DP World Constanța)	Container Terminal
Dakar	Senegal	Port of Dakar (DP World Dakar – Terminal à Conteneur)	Container Terminal
Ndayane	Senegal	Port of Ndayane	New Development and Major Expansion
Djibouti	Djibouti	Port of Djibouti (Port Autonome International de Djibouti)	Container Terminal
Djibouti	Djibouti	Port of Doraleh (Doraleh Container Terminal)	Container Terminal
Dubai	United Arab Emirates	Al Hamriya Port	Non-Container Terminal
Dubai	United Arab Emirates	Port Rashid	Container Terminal
Dubai	United Arab Emirates	Port of Jebel Ali (DP World Jebel Ali – Terminal 1)	Container Terminal
Dubai	United Arab Emirates	Port of Jebel Ali (DP World Jebel Ali – Terminal 2)	New Development and Major Expansion
Dubai	United Arab Emirates	Port of Jebel Ali (DP World Jebel Ali – Terminal 3)	New Development and Major Expansion
Durban	South Africa	Port of Durban (DP World Cargo Services – Durban)	Non-Container Terminal
Fos	France	Marseille-Fos Port (EUROFOS)	Container Terminal
Fos	France	Marseille-Fos Port (FOS 2XL)	New Development and Major Expansion
Fremantle	Australia	Fremantle Harbour (DP World Fremantle)	Container Terminal
Fujairah	United Arab Emirates	Port of Fujairah (DP World Fujairah)	Container Terminal
Germersheim	Germany	Port of Germersheim (DP World Germersheim)	Container Terminal
Greater London	United Kingdom	Port of London (DP World London Gateway)	New Development and Major Expansion
Ho Chi Minh City	Vietnam	Saigon Port Saigon Premier Container Terminal (SPCT)	Container Terminal
Hong Kong	China	Port of Hong Kong (DP World Hong Kong)	Container Terminal
Jeddah	Saudi Arabia	Jeddah Islamic Port (DP World Jeddah)	Container Terminal
Jijel	Algeria	Djen-Djen Port (DP World Djen Djen)	Container Terminal
Karachi	Pakistan	Port Qasim (DP World Karachi)	Container Terminal
Kochi	India	Kochi International Container Transshipment Terminal (DP World Cochin)	Container Terminal
Kulpi	India	Kulpi Port (DP World Kulpi)	New Development and Major Expansion
Laem Chabang	Thailand	Laem Chabang Port (Laem Chabang International Terminal)	Container Terminal
Limassol	Cyprus	Port of Limassol (DP World Limassol)	Container Terminal
Manila	Philippines	Port of Manila (South Harbor (MNS))	Container Terminal
Maputo	Mozambique	Port of Maputo (Maputo Intermodal Container Deport)	Container Terminal
Maputo	Mozambique	Port of Maputo (DP World Maputo)	Container Terminal
Maputo	Mozambique	Port of Maputo (DP World Cargo Services Mozambique)	Non-Container Terminal
Melbourne	Australia	Port of Melbourne (DP World Melbourne)	Container Terminal
Mundra	India	Mundra Port (Mundra International Container Terminal)	Container Terminal
Nanaimo	Canada	Nanaimo Harbour (DP World Nanaimo)	Container Terminal
Navi Mumbai	India	Jawaharlal Nehru Port (DP World Nhava Sheva)	Container Terminal
Novi Sad	Serbia	Port of Novi Sad (DP World Novi Sad)	New Development and Major Expansion
Paramaribo	Suriname	Jules Sedney Harbour (DP World Paramaribo)	Container Terminal
Paramaribo	Suriname	Jules Sedney Harbour (DP World Paramaribo)	Non-Container Terminal
Port Elizabeth	South Africa	Port Elizabeth (DP World Cargo Services – Port Elizabeth)	Non-Container Terminal
Prince Rupert	Canada	Port of Prince Rupert (DP World Prince Rupert Inc)	New Development and Major Expansion
Pusan	South Korea	Port of Pussan (Pusan Newport Company)	Container Terminal
Qingdao	China	Qingdao Port (Qingdao Qianwan Container Terminal)	Container Terminal
Qingdao	China	Qingdao Port (Qingdao New Qianwan Container Terminal)	Container Terminal
Qingdao	China	Qingdao Port (Qingdao Qianwan United Container Terminal)	New Development and Major Expansion
Qingdao	China	Qingdao Port (Qingdao Qianwan United Advance Container Terminal)	New Development and Major Expansion
Richards Bay	South Africa	Port of Richards Bay (DP World Cargo Services – Richards Bay)	Non-Container Terminal
Rotterdam	Netherlands	Port of Rotterdam (Rotterdam World Gateway)	New Development and Major Expansion
Saint John	Canada	Port of Saint John (DP World Saint John)	New Development and Major Expansion
Santos	Brazil	Port of Santos (Empresa Brasileira de Terminais Portuários)	New Development and Major Expansion
Sokhna	Egypt	Ain Sokhna Port (DP World Sokhna)	Container Terminal
Sokhna	Egypt	Ain Sokhna Port (DP World Sokhna)	New Development and Major Expansion
Southampton	United Kingdom	Port of Southampton (DP World Southampton)	Container Terminal
Surabaya	Indonesia	Port of Singapore (Terminal Petikemas Surabaya)	Container Terminal
Sydney	Australia	Sydney Harbour (DP World Sydney)	Container Terminal
Tarragona	Spain	Port of Tarragona (DP World Tarragona)	Container Terminal
Vancouver	Canada	Port of Vancouver (DP World Vancouver – Container Division)	Container Terminal
Vancouver	Canada	Port of Vancouver (DP World Vancouver – Stevedoring Division)	Non-Container Terminal
Tianjin	China	Port of Tianjin (Tianjin Orient Container Terminal)	Container Terminal
Visakhapatnam	India	Visakhapatnam Port (Visakha Container Terminal)	Container Terminal
Yantai	China	Port of Yantai (Yantai International Container Terminal)	Container Terminal
Yarimca	Turkey	Port of Yarimca (DP World Yarimca)	New Development and Major Expansion
Tashkent	Uzbekistan	Tashkent Multimodal Logistics Terminal	New Development and Major Expansion

== Corporate affairs ==
=== Supply chain security ===
DP World has been certified as a partner in the Customs-Trade Partnership Against Terrorism (C‑TPAT) initiative by US Customs and Border Protection – to date, the only international port operator to have achieved this recognition. This certification is primarily based on DP World's commitment to the independently audited international ISO 28000 security standards. DP World was the first global maritime terminal operator to achieve ISO 28000 supply chain security certification and is rolling out the standard to all its terminals.

=== Counter-piracy ===
In June 2012, DP World convened the second high-level, public-private counterpiracy conference, in Dubai. The Washington Post reported "Diplomats and business leaders...are pushing for stronger partnerships between the public and private sectors in combating piracy off the coast of Somalia".

The April 2011 conference was the first time companies rather than governments had contributed financial support to the UN counter-piracy trust fund. The inaugural conference was attended by more than 65 governments and representatives of international organisations, including the United Nations and more than 120 leaders from maritime industry related companies.

=== Berbera operations ===
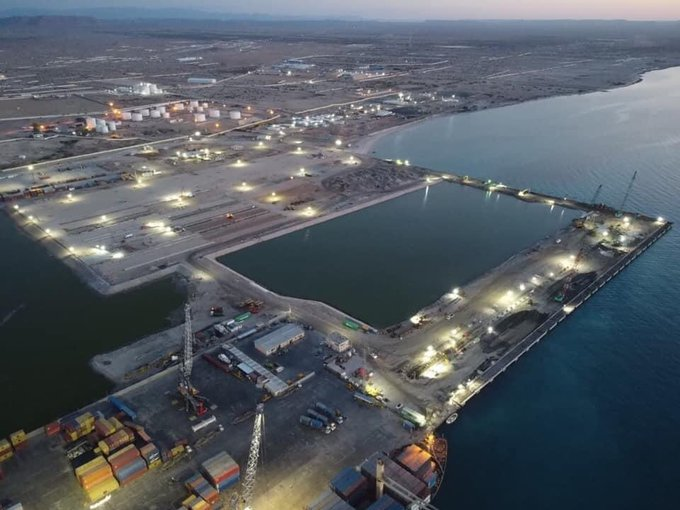
New DP World Berbera Container Terminal Port.

In 2016 a US$442 million agreement was reached between DP World and the government of Somaliland. The deal involves enhancing and operating the regional trade and logistics hub at the Port of Berbera. The project, which will be phased in, will also involve the setting up of a free zone.

On 1 March 2018, Ethiopia became a major shareholder following an agreement with DP World and the Somaliland Port Authority. DP World holds a 51% stake in the project, Somaliland 30% and Ethiopia the remaining 19%. As part of the agreement, the government of Ethiopia will invest in infrastructure to develop the Berbera Corridor as a trade gateway for the inland country, which is one of the fastest-growing countries in the world. There are also plans to construct an additional berth at the Port of Berbera, in line with the Berbera master plan which DP World has started implementing, while adding new equipment to further improve the efficiencies and productivity of the port.

The agreement comes as part of a larger government-to-government memorandum of understanding between the Government of the United Arab Emirates and the Government of Somaliland to further strengthen their strategic ties. Somalia's attempts to obstruct and block the deal were frustrated and failed to stop the project from commencing.

=== DP World Dakar ===
On 3 January 2022, construction began on the US$1.13 billion deep-water port at Ndayane, around 50 km (31 miles) south of the Senegalese capital Dakar, when president Macky Sall laid the foundation stone. DP World Dakar is a joint venture between DP World and the Port Authority of Dakar. The first phase of the project will include 840 metres of quay and a 5 kilometres marine channel designed to handle 366-metre vessels. The second phase will add 410 metres of container quay and further dredging to handle 400-metre vessels.

=== Russo-Ukrainian War ===
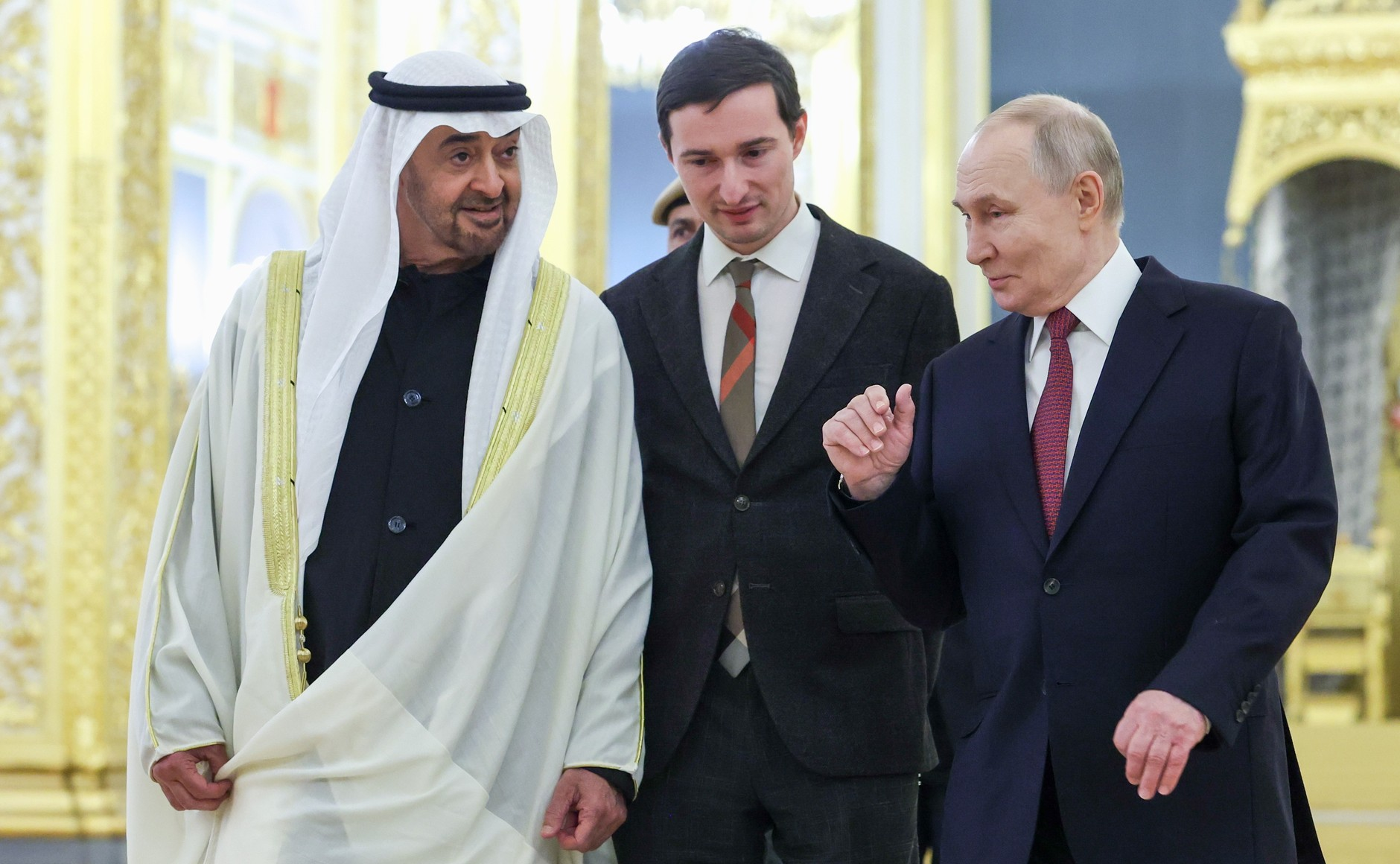
Emirati President Mohamed bin Zayed Al Nahyan with Russian President Vladimir Putin in Moscow, 29 January 2026

Because of company's continued business with Russia amid Russian invasion of Ukraine, DP World is listed among International Sponsors of War by Ukrainian National Agency on Corruption Prevention.

== Startup accelerator ==
DP World and Innovation360 setup the TURN8 accelerator in 2013.

== Sport sponsorship ==
DP World sponsored the European Tour's season ending DP World Tour Championship, Dubai, played at Jumeirah Golf Estates. DP World also supported the Hong Kong Open and the BMW PGA Championship at Wentworth Club. In November 2021, DP World invested US$400 million in the European Tour to become the tour's new title sponsor, with the tour being renamed as the DP World Tour.

In the 2020 Formula One Season, DP World and Renault F1 Team have signed an agreement making DP World the Global Logistics Partner and title sponsor for Renault, renaming the team as Renault DP World F1 Team.

In the 2020 season of the Indian Premier League (cricket), DP World was the Global Logistics Partner for the Royal Challengers Bangalore team.

DP World sponsored the yacht Maiden on her world tour 2021–24.

Dubai Turf was sponsored by DP World in 2022.

DP World was also the title sponsor for 2022 Asia Cup and 2025 Asia Cup.

DP World has signed a deal to become the title sponsor of the ILT20 for five years.

DP World announced a partnership agreement with McLaren in February 2023. DP World will also become the lead partner of McLaren APEX, McLaren's off-track business-to-business event programme, promoting influential collaborations across McLaren's expansive partner network and beyond.

DP World became a sponsor of the Fremantle Dockers in the Australian Football League from the 2023 season on the shorts, then above the number on the jersey from the 2025 season.

== See also ==
- Brazil–Africa Trade Corridor
