= As Suways =

As Suways may refer to:

- Suez, a seaport town in Egypt
- As Suways Governorate, a governorate of Egypt
