= New Mooring Container Terminal =

Port facility in Chittagong, Bangladesh

The New Mooring Container Terminal (NCT; also NMCT) is a container port facility at the Port of Chittagong in Bangladesh. It is the largest terminal in the country. It handled 44% of the port's container traffic in 2024.

The NCT is a brownfield riverine terminal with an 820-metre quay wall. It has five jetties. Four of them are dedicated to ocean-going vessels and the remaining one is for smaller ships on inland routes. The terminal was built with support from the China Harbour Engineering Group. The Chittagong Port Authority (CPA) signed the construction agreement in 2004. The initial construction began in 2004 and was completed in 2007. The adjacent overflow container yard (OCY) for additional storage was developed later in 2015.

Since 2007, Saif Powertec Ltd, a local firm, operated two of the jetties on an ad hoc basis. While the terminal was aimed to be the first port-centric foreign investment in the country, the international tendering process initiated under the Caretaker government of Fakhruddin Ahmed was canceled following Awami League's return to power in 2009. The four pre-qualified international operators under this tender, including Orient Steam Navigation Company (a subsidiary of Dubai-based DP World), were expected to submit their final tender on 25 February 2010. Later reports attributed the cancellation to interventions by Noor-e-Alam Chowdhury, the then chairman of Jatiya Sangsad's Standing Committee on Ministry of Shipping, and Shajahan Khan, the Minister of Shipping.

In June 2012, a fresh round of tender began for selecting a terminal operator. Five international and local firms submitted their bids on 30 August. On 2 September, a panel from the Central Procurement Technical Unit (CPTU) stopped the tender to review the allegation of irregularities in the bidding process by an international bidder. The CPTU later asked CPA to cancel the 2012 tender and begin a new tendering process. The orders issued by the review panel included that CPA retain the list of pre-qualified operators originally selected under the terms and conditions of the pre-qualification documents from 2008. This was reportedly done in light of changes and relaxation of terms CPA made to the original bidding documents under the Ministry's directions in the preceding two and a half years following the initial tender. Saif Powertec challenged the CPTU decision at the High Court Division and obtained a three-month stay order on the cancellation of the 2012 tender.

In October 2015, Shipping Minister Shajahan Khan inaugurates the operational activities of four of the berths

In June 2014, CPA and Saif Powertec renewed their contract for cargo-handling services at the two berths as the contract approached expiry under Direct Procurement Method (DPM). In 2015, the CPA formally appointed Saif Powertec and its joint-venture (JV) partner firms as the operators for the four jetties. This decision was subject to controversy and faced allegations of irregularities intended to benefit the firm, including violations of procurement laws, misuse of port ordinance, and public purchase committee bypass in the tendering process.

On 17 February 2019, Bangladesh's Public-Private Partnership Authority (PPPA) signed a memorandum of understanding with DP World for it to take over as the terminal operator. On 23 March 2023, the plans for a government-to-government (G2G) agreement in favour of DP World received initial in-principle approval by the Cabinet Committee on Economic Affairs (CCEA).

In December 2024, it was reported that CPA planned to use the Open Tender Method (OTM) to appoint the operator for the terminal. Saif Powertec's six-month contract due to end on 7 January 2025 was subsequently extended for a further six months. Thus, CPA's final deal with the firm for the NCT lapsed on 7 July. This marked the end of Saif Powertec's arrangements with CPA which involved 12 consecutive short-term contracts under DPM. Against this backdrop, the Ministry of Shipping decided in principle to put the terminal under the direct management of CPA. The port authority then assigned the Chattogram Dry Dock Limited (CDDL), an organisation owned by the Bangladesh Navy, as the terminal operator for NCT. This was facilitated through a direct six-month arrangement with CPA. This temporary measure was taken as the government had decided to hand over the terminal to foreign operators and it had expected to sign a formal agreement with DP World by November 2025.

In October 2026, Bangladesh government officials sign contract with DP World

Meanwhile, a writ petition was filed on 20 March 2025 against the government decision to appoint DP World as the terminal operator for NCT. On 4 December 2025, a two-person bench at the High Court Division issued a split verdict, prompting a move to another High Court bench for final disposal. On 20 January 2026, it was reported that the petition sought to transfer the case from a single bench to a full bench. An expression of no-confidence in the bench of Justice Zafar Ahmed was then submitted and was rejected by the relevant bench. On 29 January, the High Court bench rejected the writ petition. On 12 March 2026, the Appellate Division of the Supreme Court of Bangladesh upheld the High Court decision, removing any legal barrier to moving forward with an international operator.

On 1 October 2026, the Cabinet Committee on Economic Affairs (CCEA) approved the project for concession agreement for handing over the operation of the terminal and its overflow yard to international operators for an initial 15-year term, with a provision for extending the tenure. The concession agreement with DP World was signed on 8 October. A report from The Business Standard noted that the full concession agreement had not been made public, and underlined the uncertainty surrounding how key commitments would be measured and enforced.
