= Somaliland Ports Authority =

Government agency in Somaliland

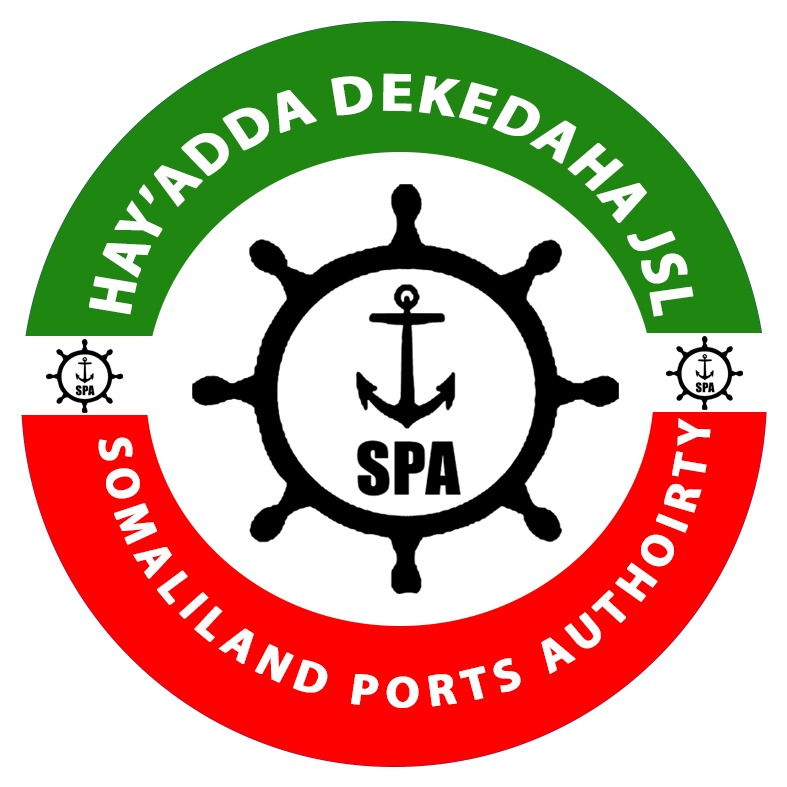
- Company type: Government Authority
- Founded: 2017
- Headquarters: Hargeisa and Port of Berbera, Somaliland
- Key people: Saiid Hassan Abdilaah, Chairman
- Services: Container terminals, cargo handling, bunkering, transport maintenance
- Website: spa.govsomaliland.org

Somaliland Ports Authority (SPA) is a government agency responsible for the operation of three ports in Somaliland. The authorities headquarters are located in Hargeisa and Port of Berbera.

== See also ==
- Government of Somaliland
- Port of Berbera
- DP World Berbera New Port
