= Port of Berbera =

Port of Berbera ميناء بربرة Dekedda Berbera
- Interactive map of Port of Berbera ميناء بربرة; Dekedda Berbera
- Location within Somaliland

Location
- Country: Somaliland
- Location: Berbera
- Coordinates: 10.438°N 44.997°E
- UN/LOCODE: SOBBO

Details
- Opened: 1969
- Operated by: DP World and Berbera Port Authority
- Owned by: Somaliland Ports Authority
- Type of Harbor: natural harbour
- No. of berths: 5
- Draft depth: 17 m.
- General Manager: Said Xasan Abdulahi

Statistics
- Website www.dpworldberbera.com

The Port of Berbera (Somali: Dekedda Berbera, Arabic: ميناء بربرة), also known as Berbera Port, is the official seaport of Berbera, the commercial capital of Somaliland. It is classified as a major port in Somalia.

== Overview ==
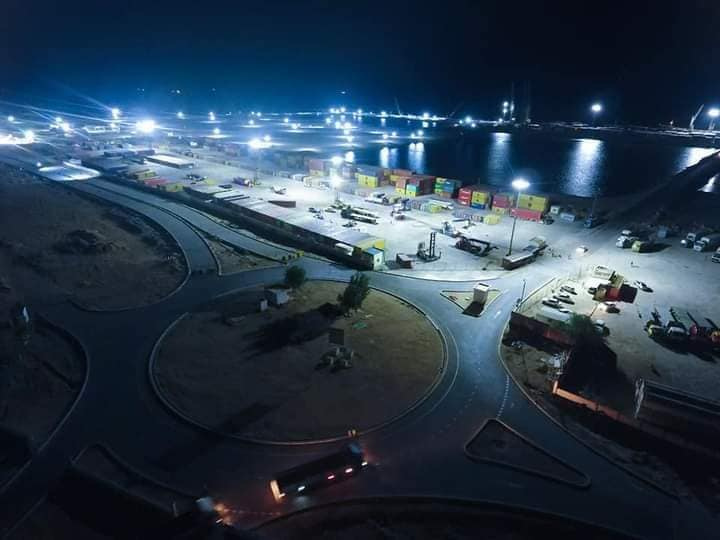
Berbera port View at night

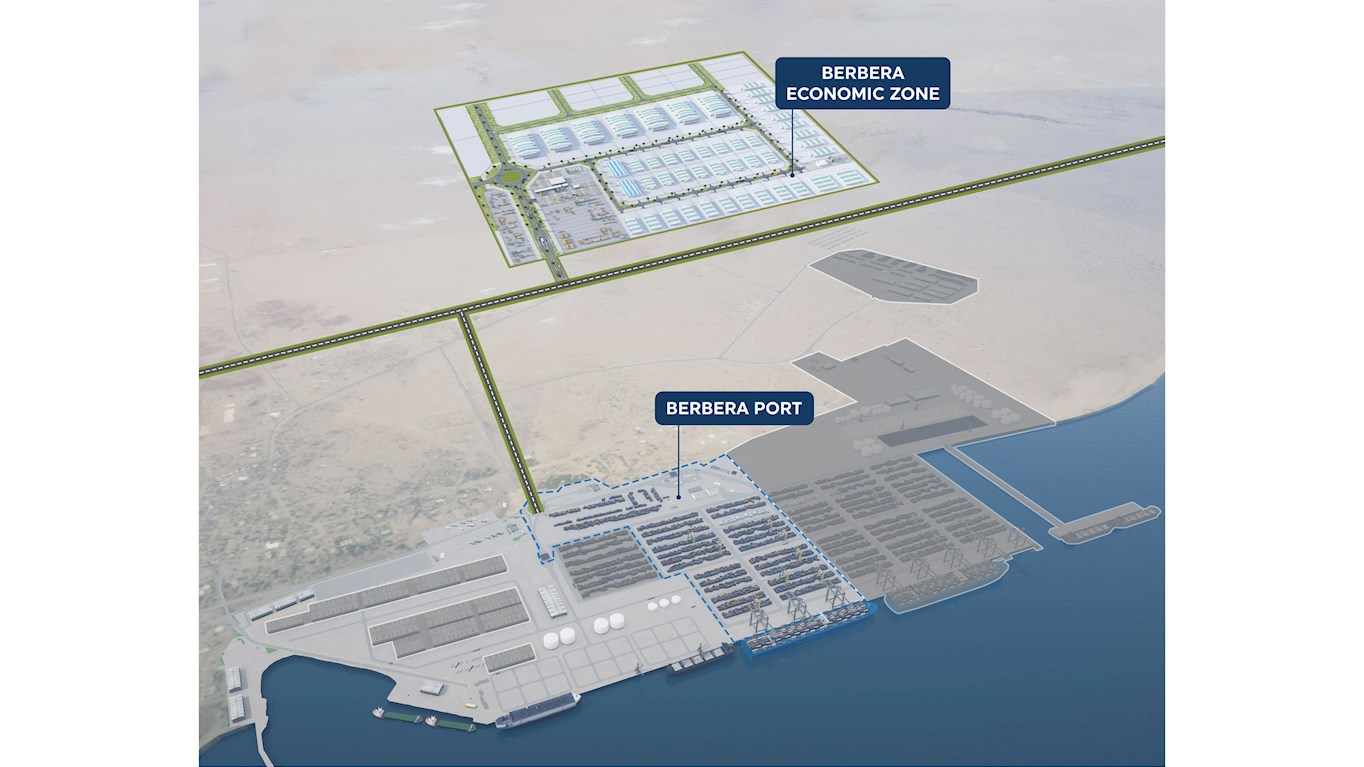
New DP World Berbera DP World Berbera Masterplan.

Berbera Port historically served as a naval and missile base for the Somali central government. Following a 1962 agreement between the Somali Republic and the Soviet Union, the port's facilities were upgraded and patronized by the Soviets. It was later expanded for US military use, after the Somali authorities strengthened ties with the American government.

In July 2013, the Raysut Cement of Oman announced that it is scheduled to build a new state-of-the-art cement terminal at the Port of Berbera. The construction project is part of a joint venture with Somali business partners. It will comprise three silos with a 4000 t capacity each, which will be earmarked for storage, packing and distribution of cement.

Berbera Port Development: The 30-Year Lease Agreement between Somaliland and DP World

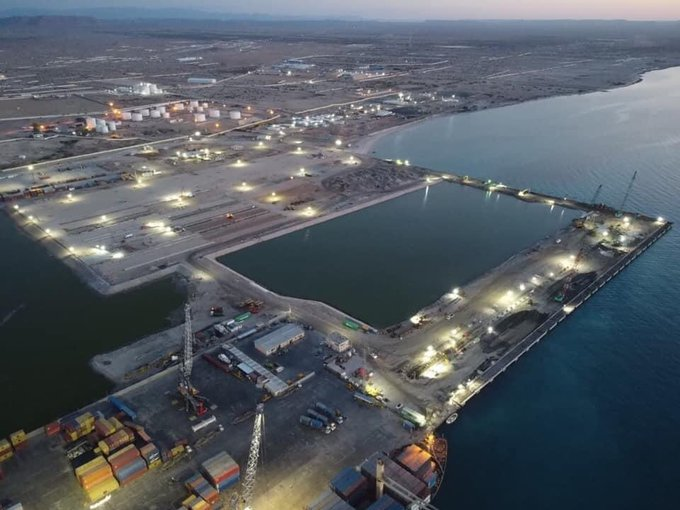
New DP World Berbera Container Terminal Port.

In May 2016, DP World signed a $442 million agreement with the government of Somaliland to operate a regional trade and logistics hub at the Port of Berbera. The project, which will be phased in, will also involve the setting up of a free zone.

On 1 March 2018, Ethiopia became a major shareholder following an agreement with DP World and the Somaliland Port Authority. DP World holds a 51% stake in the project, Somaliland 30% and CDC Group the remaining 19%. As part of the agreement, the government of Ethiopia will invest in infrastructure to develop the Berbera Corridor as a trade gateway for the inland country, which is one of the fastest growing countries in the world. There are also plans to construct an additional berth at the Port of Berbera, in line with the Berbera master plan, which DP World has started implementing, while adding new equipment to further improve efficiencies and productivity of the port.

However, in 2022, Somaliland officials declared that Ethiopia lost its 19% stake due to failure to meet the required conditions (e.g., financial contributions for infrastructure). This effectively leaves the current structure as:

- DP World: 51%
- Somaliland: 49%

After 2022, the Port of Berbera continued to grow into a major regional trade hub under the management of DP World. Between 2023 and 2026, the port improved its infrastructure, expanded container handling capacity, and increased the efficiency of cargo operations through better technology and storage facilities. The development of the Berbera Economic Zone also progressed, attracting investment in logistics and industry. At the same time, trade through the Berbera Corridor to Ethiopia increased significantly, making the port more important as an alternative route to Djibouti. Overall, these developments strengthened Berbera’s role in regional trade and boosted its economic and strategic importance in the Horn of Africa.

The agreement comes as part of a larger government-to-government Memorandum of understanding between Government of the United Arab Emirates and the Government of Somaliland to further strengthen their strategic ties. However, the agreement has stirred up debate with the main Somaliland opposition party Waddani arguing the agreement was between Somalia and the UAE, this claim was denied by the Minister of Foreign Affairs of Somalia stating that no evidence was produced indicating the Berbera port deal was signed with previous governments of Somalia.

== See also ==
- Somaliland
- DP World Berbera New Port
- DP World
- Transportation in Somaliland
