= Brazil–Africa Trade Corridor =

Transatlantic trade route and logistics network between Brazil and Africa

- Type: Maritime and terrestrial logistics network
- Active: 2026–present
- Status: Active
- Countries: Brazil, Angola, Mozambique, South Africa
- Connects: South Atlantic Ocean
- Start: Port of Santos, Brazil
- End: Port of Luanda (Angola), Port of Maputo (Mozambique), and South African inland networks
- Transport modes: Container ship, rail transport, trucking
- Commodities: Animal proteins, agricultural commodities, consumer goods, fertilizers, petroleum
- Management: DP World and bilateral trade frameworks

The Brazil–Africa Trade Corridor (also marketed as the Brazil–Africa Link) is an active commercial logistics network linking Brazil with key markets in Angola, Mozambique and South Africa. It was launched by DP World in April 2026 to provide an integrated supply chain between Latin America's largest economy and high‑growth African markets.

== Historical background ==
Portugal's colonial presence in both Brazil and Africa (Angola, Mozambique, Guinea‑Bissau, Cape Verde and São Tomé and Príncipe) left a common administrative and commercial imprint. After Brazil’s independence in 1822, however, Africa "fell largely out of sight in Brazil," and for much of the 20th century, its share in Brazil’s foreign trade was minimal. The share of Africa in Brazilian exports declined from 7.9 per cent in 1985 to 3.2 per cent in 1990, while imports fell from 13.2 per cent to 2.8 per cent, dropping back to levels seen in the 1950s and 1960s. This limited trade was further reinforced by the maritime logistics network. Because there were very few direct ocean services, cargo for much of the 20th century was typically routed through transshipment hubs in West Africa or Europe, which added both time and cost to the route. Consequently, shipments are still often routed via these hubs, increasing transit times and putting pressure on vessel space.

A turning point came with the ratification of the SACU–MERCOSUR Preferential Trade Agreement in April 2016, which created a formal tariff‑reduction framework between South America's leading trade bloc and the Southern African Customs Union. Subsequently, Dubai‑based DP World began acquiring port and logistics assets on both sides of the South Atlantic, eventually marketing them as a single integrated corridor.

== Trade and regulatory framework ==
The corridor is underpinned by a multilateral trade agreement and a corporate logistics network.

=== SACU–MERCOSUR Preferential Trade Agreement ===
The Preferential Trade Agreement between the Southern Common Market (MERCOSUR) and the Southern African Customs Union (SACU) entered into force in April 2016. It aims to promote bilateral trade flows by establishing fixed preference margins on approximately 1,000 tariff lines from each side, with margins ranging between 10% and 100%. Duties on over 63% of SACU members' tariff lines on goods from MERCOSUR were either eliminated or reduced. The agreement also contains provisions on rules of origin, safeguard measures, dispute settlement procedures and customs cooperation.

=== BRICS and diplomatic alignment ===
Both Brazil and South Africa are founding members of BRICS and partners in the IBSA (India–Brazil–South Africa) forum. Within these groupings, as well as in the G20 and the WTO, they have consistently championed fairer, more inclusive rules for global trade and investment, as well as development‑oriented reform of the international financial architecture. President Cyril Ramaphosa stated during a state visit to Brazil on 9 March 2026 that the two countries seek to position South Africa as Brazil's gateway into African markets under the African Continental Free Trade Area (AfCFTA), while Brazil serves as South Africa's gateway into Latin America.

=== DP World's integrated logistics model ===
The physical operation of the corridor is managed exclusively by DP World, which bundles ocean freight, port handling, warehousing and inland road transport under a single contract. The company describes this as an end‑to‑end or "one‑stop‑shop" solution. The model provides access to three port terminals, 52 warehouses and a fleet of more than 4,250 vehicles.

== Infrastructure and logistics ==
=== Port of Santos (Brazil) ===
The Port of Santos is Brazil’s largest container port and is the western end of the Brazil–Africa Trade Corridor. At the port, DP World runs one of the country’s leading multipurpose terminals at the former Embraport site (largest multipurpose private-sector port terminal of Brazil).In 2025, this terminal set a new record by moving 1.3 million twenty‑foot equivalent units (TEUs) and 5 million tons of paper-making material (pulp).

A major expansion program is underway, including quay lengthening, new berthing piers and equipment upgrades. DP World is currently executing investments of more than R$2 billion (approximately US$400 million).An additional R$1.6 billion (US$320 million) will raise container handling capacity to 1.7 million TEUs by 2026 and to 2.1 million TEUs by 2028.The company has also partnered with the Brazilian logistics firm Rumo to build a new grains and fertilizers terminal at Santos, with an annual handling capacity of up to 12.5 million tones.

=== African gateways ===
Across the South Atlantic, the corridor uses DP World's port concessions and logistics assets in three countries:

Location	Asset type	Role in the corridor
Luanda, Angola	Multipurpose port terminal (20‑year concession)	Primary landing point for containerised and break‑bulk cargo
Maputo, Mozambique	Port concession	Secondary gateway serving Southern and East African markets
South Africa	Inland warehousing and road transport network	Feeds cargo from ports into deep‑country destinations

The company also operates six freight forwarding offices across Brazil, offering multimodal transport by ocean, air and road, as well as customs clearance, insurance and container freight station services.

== Commodity flows ==
Trade along the corridor reflects the complementary production profiles of the two regions.

=== Brazil → Africa ===
According to the Brazilian ambassador to South Africa, bilateral trade between the two countries reached R32.5 billion in 2025, with South African exports to Brazil totalling R5.2 billion and imports from Brazil amounting to R27.3 billion. Key Brazilian exports to South Africa include agricultural and manufactured goods, while South Africa exports mainly minerals and chemicals to Brazil.

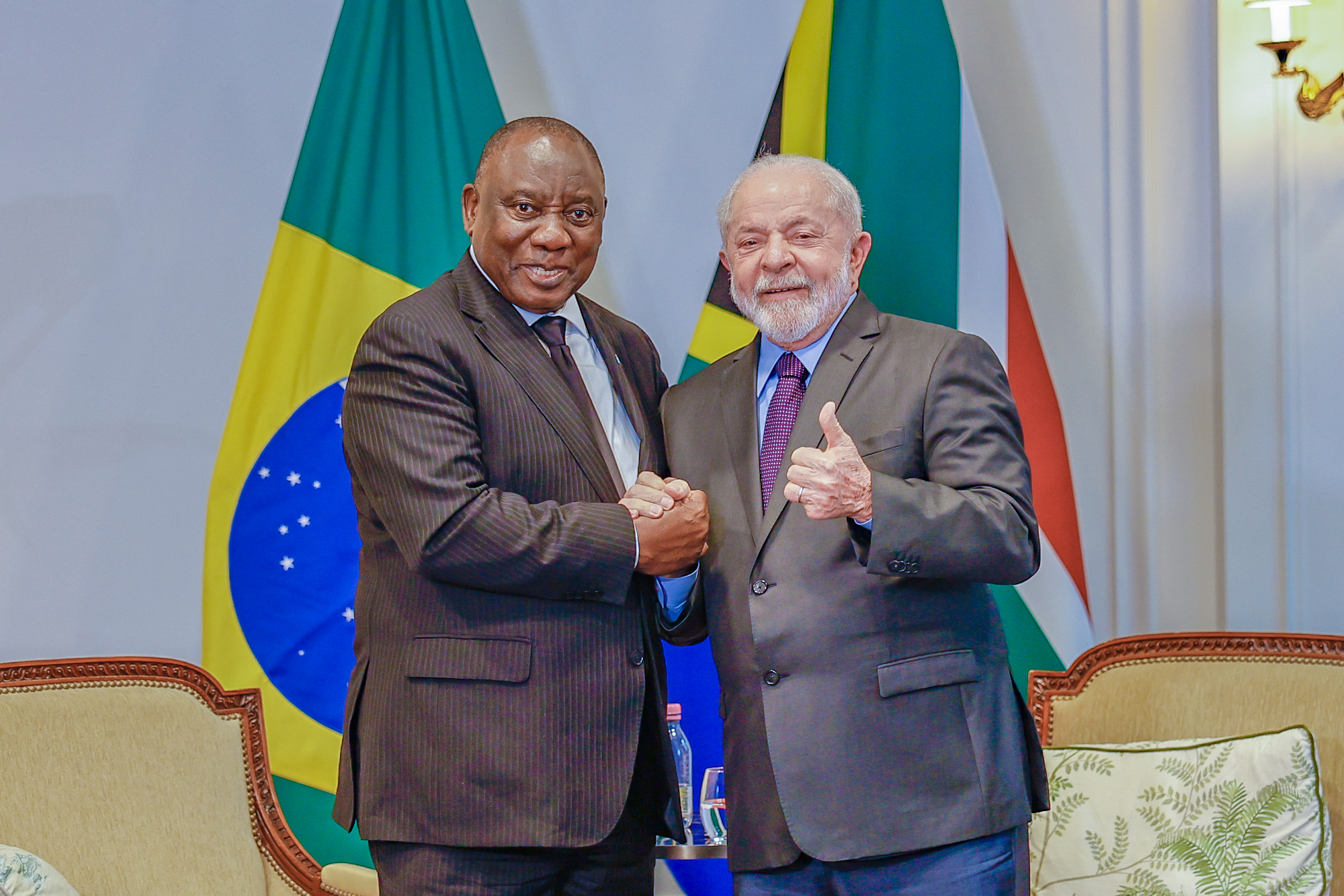
Brazilian President Luiz Inácio Lula da Silva (right) with South African President Cyril Ramaphosa in 2023

For Nigeria – a potential extension of the corridor – bilateral trade reached US$1.2 billion between January and July 2025, with Brazilian exports of $654.9 million and imports of $591.7 million.

=== Africa → Brazil ===
The trade relationship between the two regions shows that Africa's exports to Brazil are concentrated in fertilizers (which account for over 50% of African exports to Brazil), crude petroleum and chemical components.Brazil is heavily dependent on imported fertilisers. In 2025, the country imported a record 43.32 million tonnes of fertilisers, representing 88.2% of total national deliveries, according to data from the National Association for the Diffusion of Fertilizers (ANDA). For potash, imports account for approximately 97% of domestic consumption.

== Challenges and criticisms ==
Despite its strategic logic, the Brazil–Africa Trade Corridor faces several headwinds.

Modest trade volumes. Total Brazil–Africa commerce declined from roughly US$28 billion in 2013 to about US$21 billion in recent years, representing only about 3.5% of Brazil's total trade.Total Brazil–Africa commerce declined from roughly US$28 billion in 2013 to about US$21 billion in recent years, representing only about 3.5% of Brazil's total trade.

Fragmented shipping lanes. Historically, most South Atlantic freight has been routed via third‑country transshipment hubs, and the DP World‑operated corridor is still in its early stages.

Infrastructure gaps. Many secondary ports in West and Southern Africa lack the capacity and digital integration needed to handle large, direct container flows, and inland road and rail networks remain underdeveloped.

== See also ==
- South-South cooperation
- BRICS
- Mercosur
- Southern African Customs Union
- Port of Santos
- DP World
