= DP World Berbera New Port =

Port in Republic of Somaliland

DP World Berbera New Port ميناء بربرة الجديد لموانئ دبي العالمية Dekedda Cusub ee DP World ee Berbera

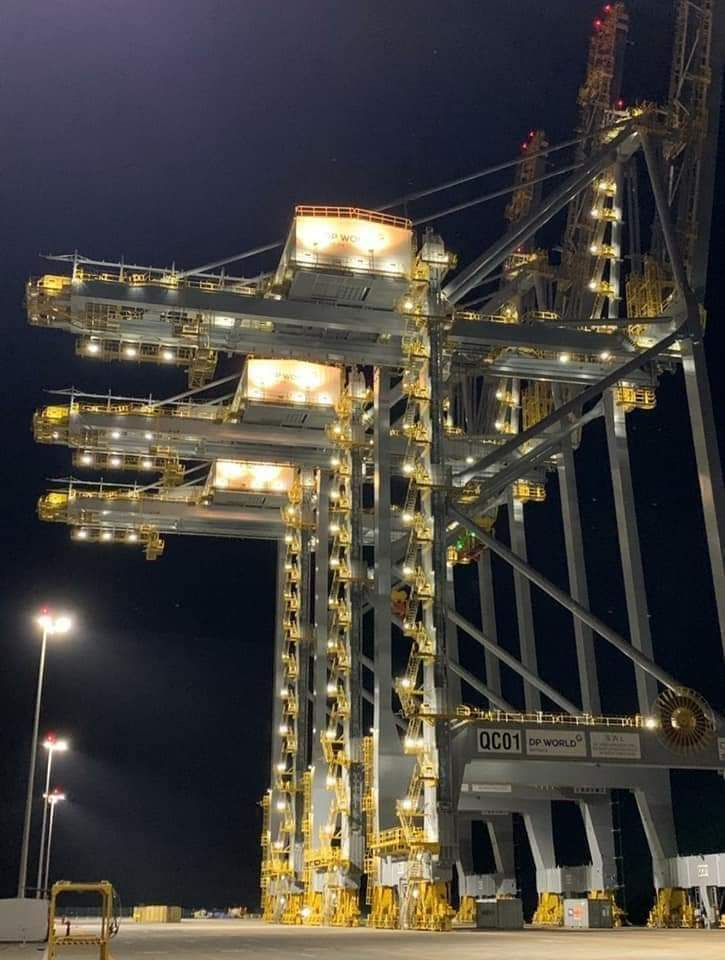
- DP World Berbera New Port View.

- Interactive map of DP World Berbera New Port ميناء بربرة الجديد لموانئ دبي العالمية; Dekedda Cusub ee DP World ee Berbera

- Location within Somaliland

Location
- Country: Somaliland
- Location: Berbera
- Coordinates: 10.429°N 44.990°E
- UN/LOCODE: SOBBO

Details
- Opened: 24 June 2021
- Operated by: DP World
- Owned by: DP World
- Draft depth: 17 m
- Managing Director: Supachai Wattanaveerachai

Statistics
- Website www.dpworldberbera.com

The DP World Berbera New Port (Somali: Dekedda Cusub ee DP World ee Berbera, Arabic: ميناء بربرة الجديد لموانئ دبي العالمية), also known as DP World Berbera, is the new port of the DP World in the city of Berbera and its only branch in Republic of Somaliland.

== Overview ==
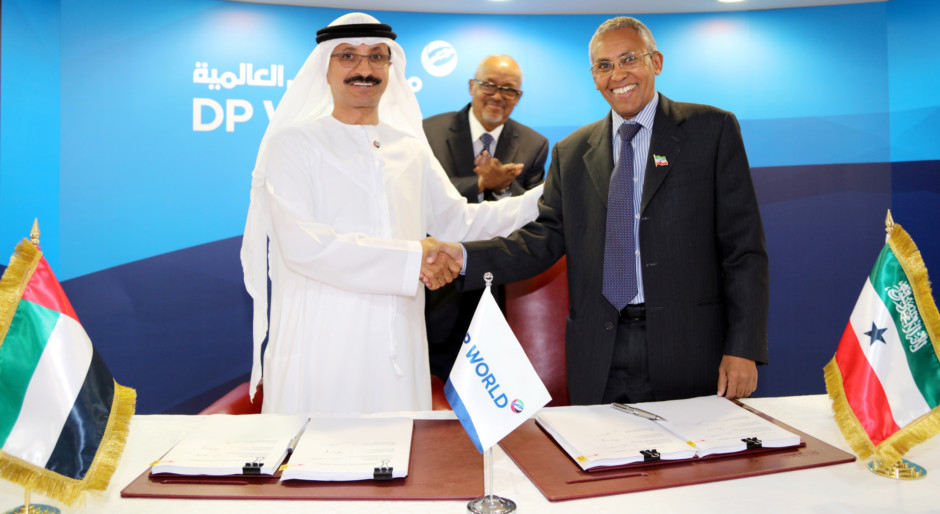
Sultan Ahmed Bin Sulayem, Group Chairman and CEO, DP World with Dr. Saad Ali Shire, Minister of Foreign Affairs and International Cooperation, Republic of Somaliland at the signing ceremony at DP World's flagship Jebel Ali Port in Dubai.

In May 2016, DP World signed a US$442 million agreement with the government of Somaliland, to operate and exercise a regional trade and logistics hub at the Port of Berbera. The project, which will be phased in, will also involve the setting up of a free zone.

On 1 March 2018, Ethiopia became a major shareholder following an agreement with DP World and the Somaliland Port Authority. DP World holds a 51% stake in the project, Somaliland 30% and Ethiopia the remaining 19%.

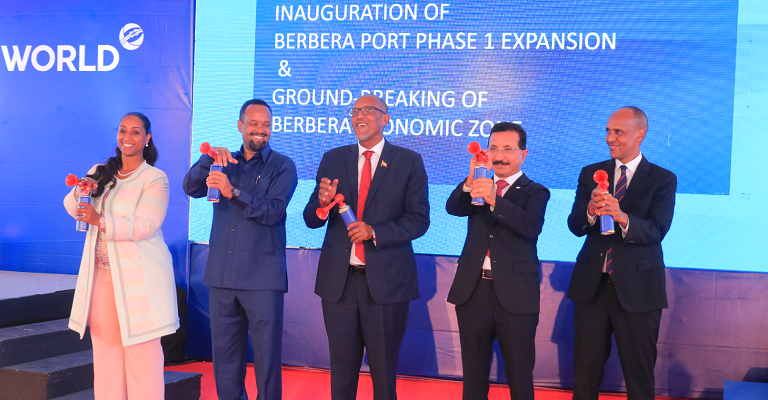
President Musa Bihi Abdi with Sultan Ahmed Bin Sulayem, Mustafa Muhummed Omer (Agjar), President of Somali Region of Ethiopia and Ahmed Shide Minister of Finance and Dagmawit Moges Minister of Transport of Ethiopia inaugurated the first phase of the new terminal of DP World Berbera

On 24 July 2021, The new container terminal in Berbera Port was officially inaugurated by Muse Bihi Abdi, President of Somaliland, Sultan Ahmed bin Sulayem, Group Chairman and CEO of DP World and a government delegation from Ethiopia, led by Ahmed Shide Minister of Finance and Dagmawit Moges Minister of Transport A new 400-meter berth and three ship gantry cranes with a capacity of 500,000 TEUs per year.

== Dry ports Hargeisa (Bypass road) - Tog wajaale ==
Major dry port in Somaliland include Hargeisa bypass road container area 22 km from Hargeisa central and Tog wajaale container area in western Somaliland, Tog wajaale exports towards Ethiopia.

=== Berbera Corridor ===
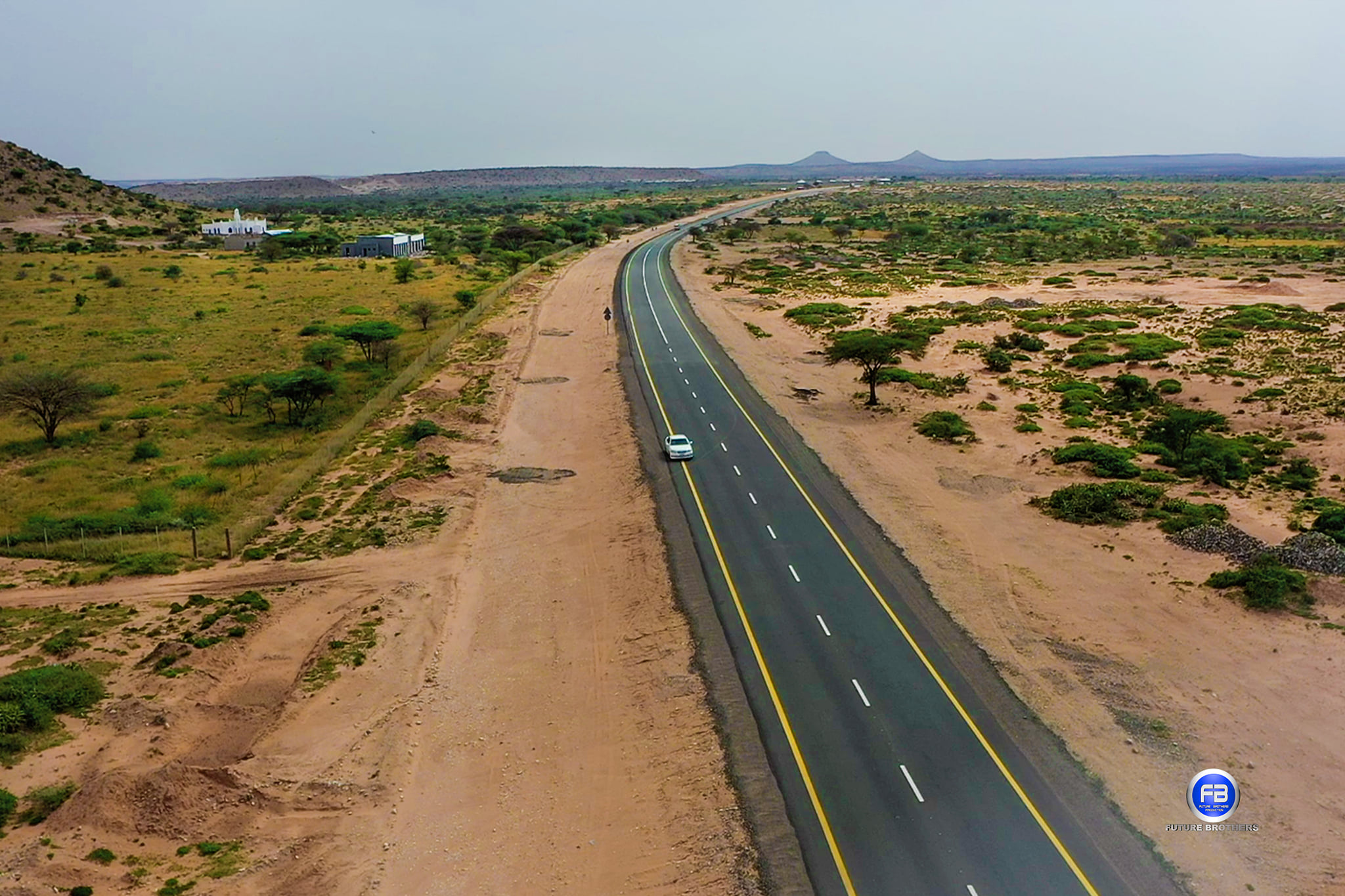
Berbera Corridor, also known as Berbera – Wajaale Road

The construction of the Berbera corridor was an integral part of a contract agreement made by the Somaliland government and the United Arab Emirates and its owned port company Dubai Ports World. The corridor connects Berbera port to Hargeisa, Somaliland’s capital, passing through Tog Wajaale and connecting to Ethiopia.

=== Expansion and growth forecast ===
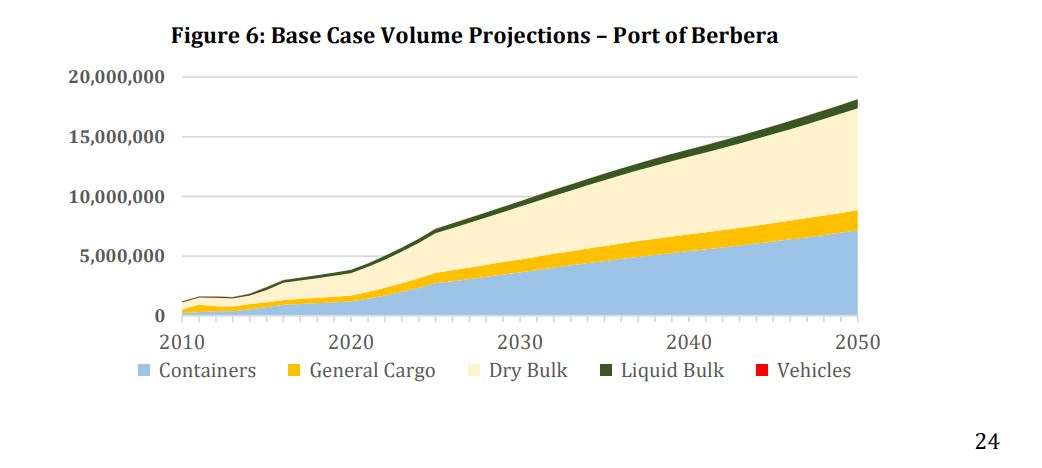

According to World Bank, the volumes handled in the Port of Berbera are expected to increase from 3.0 million ton in 2016 to 18.1 million ton in 2050. With approximately 47.1 percent of the volumes handled by the Port of Berbera in 2050, dry bulks are predicted to be the largest cargo type, followed by containers with 39.4 percent and general cargo with 9.3 percent. Containerized cargo is split equally between imports and exports, whereas dry bulks are expected to consist entirely of imports. General cargo exports represent about 90 percent of total volumes in 2050, with livestock being the primary export commodity. With just 10,000 tons (about 7,000 vehicle units) in 2050, vehicles represent the smallest cargo type. As there is not export of crude oil, liquid bulk volumes are not a significant import commodity either in 2050, representing just 0.8 million ton in 2050. Total volumes are expected to increase with a compounded annual growth rate of 8.7 percent in 2016-2030, 3.8 percent in 2030-2040, and 2.7 percent in 2040-2050. The large difference in these growth rates is because Berbera is expected to capture 7.5 percent of the Ethiopian container, dry bulk, and general cargo volumes between 2021 and 2025.

== See also ==
- Somaliland
- DP World
- Port of Berbera
- Transportation in Somaliland
