= ZPMC =

Chinese state-owned crane manufacturer

Shanghai Zhenhua Heavy Industries Company Limited

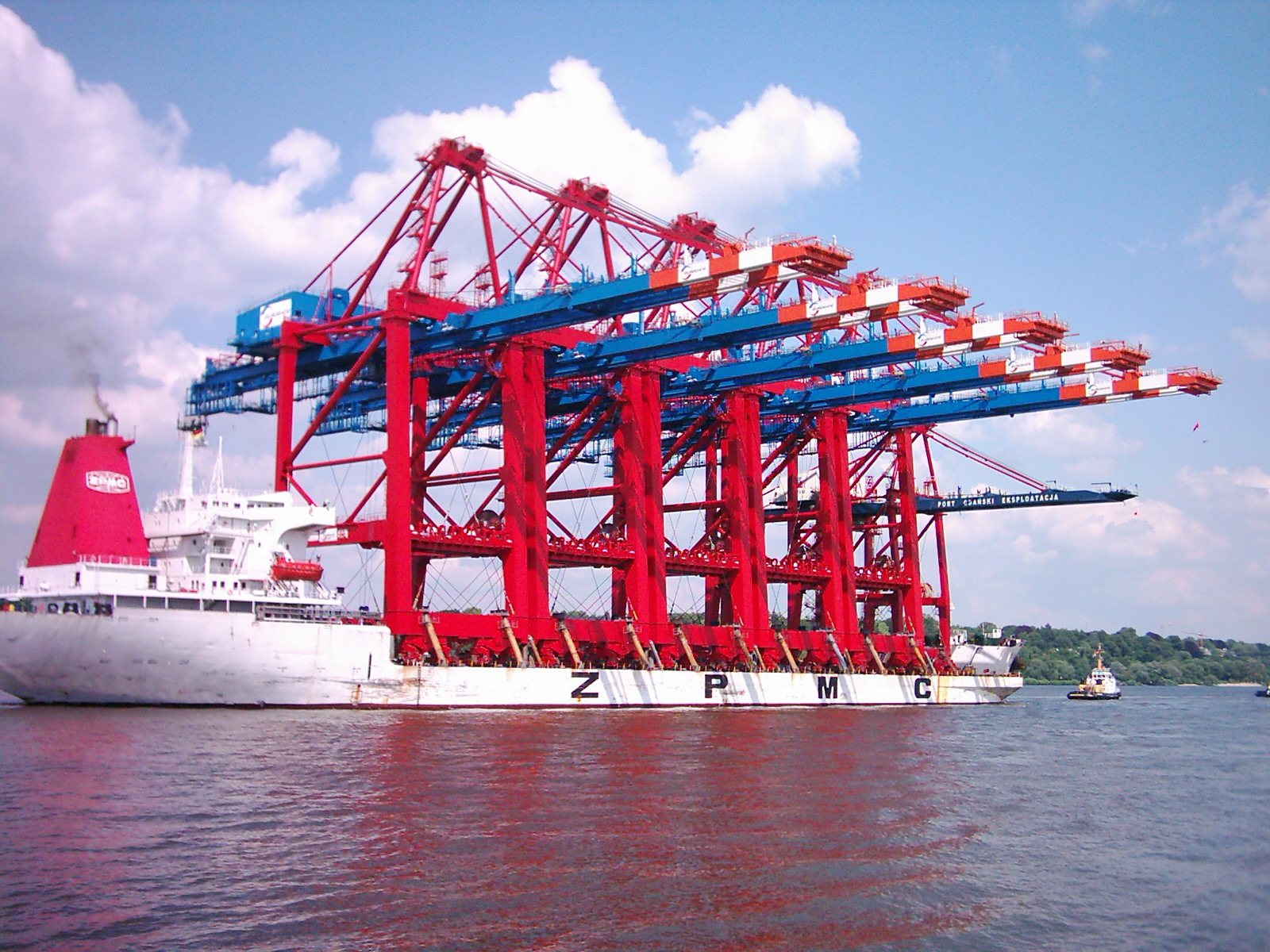
- Heavy lift vessel Zhen Hua 20 transports five ship-to-shore gantry cranes manufactured by ZPMC
- Native name: 上海振华重工(集团)股份有限公司
- Type: Subsidiary; State-owned enterprise
- Traded as: SSE: 600320 (A share); SSE: 900947 (B share)
- Industry: Crane manufacturing
- Founded: 1992; 34 years ago
- Headquarters: Shanghai, China
- Area served: Global
- Key people: Zhou Jichang (Chair); Guan Tongxian (Director)
- Revenue: 22,655,141,652 renminbi (2020)
- Net income: 422,240,299 renminbi (2020)
- Number of employees: 8,702 (2020)
- Parent: China Communications Construction Company
- Website: www.zpmc.com

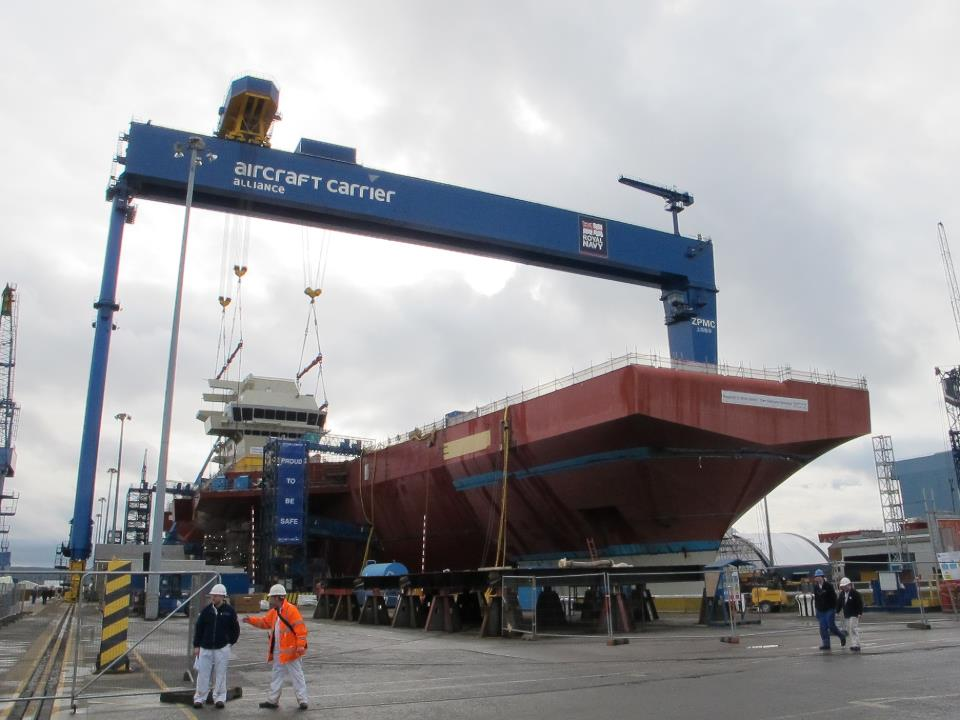
A ZPMC rail mounted gantry crane was used in the construction of the British aircraft carrier HMS Queen Elizabeth

Shanghai Zhenhua Heavy Industries Company Limited (ZPMC) is a Chinese state-owned engineering company and the world's largest manufacturer of cranes and large steel structures. In 2015 the company accounted for about 75% of the world-market share for container cranes.

== History ==
The company was founded in 1992. It is a wholly owned subsidiary of China Communications Construction Company. ZPMC is listed on the Shanghai Stock Exchange. It specializes in designing, manufacturing, erecting, commissioning, shipping in fully erected state, after-sales servicing and developing new port machinery products. Its main products include container cranes (QCs) (supplied eight for London Gateway), rubber-tyred gantry cranes (RTGs), bulk-material ship loaders and unloaders, bucket-wheel stackers and reclaimers, portal cranes, floating cranes engineering vessels and large steel bridge structures. Its cranes are found in 120 large ports around the globe.

In 2009, the company rebranded itself as Shanghai Zhenhua Heavy Industries Co., Ltd.

In 2021, the Port of Piraeus received three ZPMC container cranes, doubling the lifting capabilities of the former container crane and equipped with a remote control system.

In 2021, agents of the Federal Bureau of Investigation (FBI) believed to have discovered intelligence-gathering equipment on a cargo ship delivering ZPMC cranes to the Port of Baltimore. China saw the report as paranoid. Since the 2023 Chinese balloon incident, the ZPMC has come under suspicion by U.S. officials and lawmakers over their cranes suspected spying capabilities and ZPMC's participation in military-civil fusion.

In February 2024, US officials announced a plan to have the United States Coast Guard oversee the cybersecurity of port cranes and invest in replacements of ZPMC cranes at US ports. In March 2024, The Wall Street Journal reported that US congressional investigators identified a communications device in ZPMC cranes not part of normal operations. A probe by the United States House Committee on Homeland Security and the United States House Select Committee on Strategic Competition between the United States and the Chinese Communist Party found that ZPMC pressured port operators to allow it remote access.

== San Francisco–Oakland Bay Bridge ==
The company is the fabricator of the new Bay Bridge located in the San Francisco Bay Area in the USA. Although the company had no previous experience in bridge construction, California officials selected it based on the advantages of "huge steel fabrication facilities, its large low-cost work force and its solid finance." The project employed 3,000 workers who built a main bridge tower and completed 28 bridge decks.
