= Sultan Ahmed bin Sulayem =

Emirati businessman (born 1955)

- سلطان أحمد بن سليم
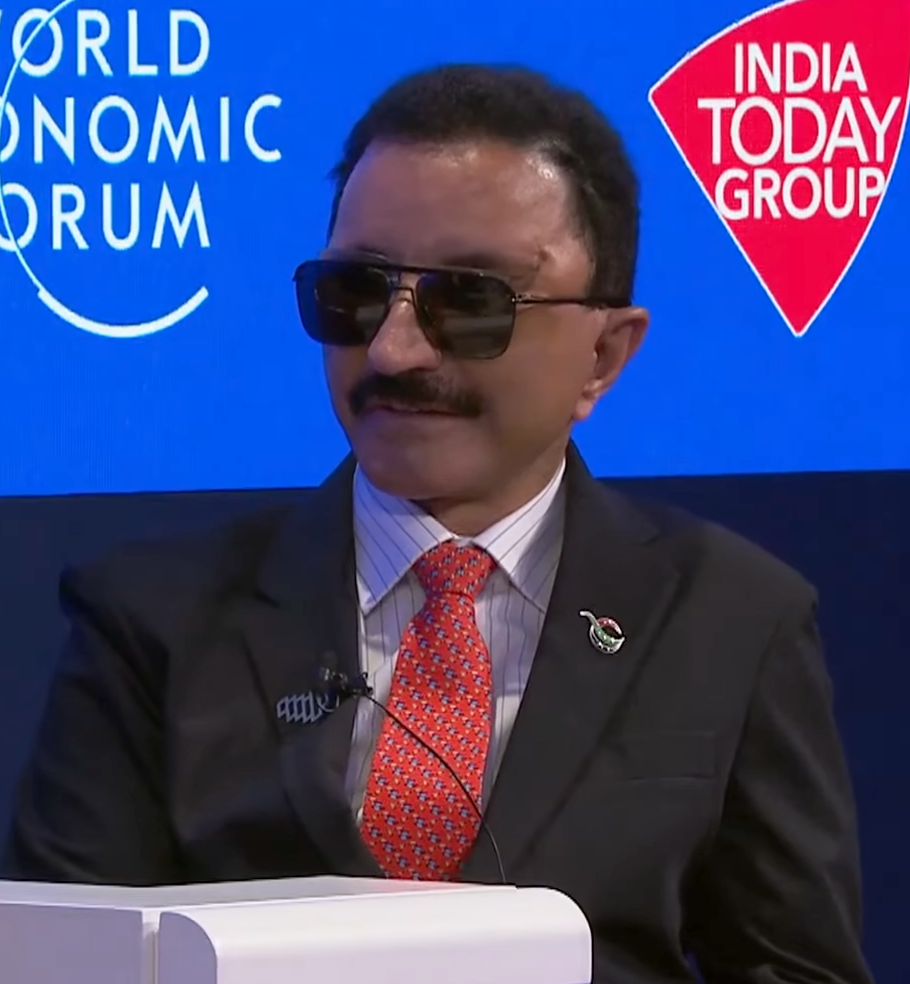
- Bin Sulayem in 2025
- Born: Sultan Ahmed bin Sulayem; 1955 (age 70–71); Dubai, Trucial States
- Education: Temple University
- Years active: 1985–present
- Title: Former Chairman & CEO, DP World; Chairman, Hyperloop One
- Board member of: Seven Tides
- Children: Ahmed Sultan Bin Sulayem
- Relatives: Mohammed Ben Sulayem (brother)

Sultan Ahmed bin Sulayem (Arabic: سلطان أحمد بن سليم, born 1955) is an Emirati businessman. He is the CEO of MMC Ports, Malaysia’s largest port operating group and a subsidiary of MMC Corporation. He was the chairman and chief executive officer (CEO) of DP World until 13 February 2026, and the chairman of the Ports, Customs & Free Zone Corporation until February 2026. In the February 2026 public release of the Epstein files, it was revealed that he exchanged emails with Jeffrey Epstein. He resigned from his executive positions due to his association with Epstein.

== Family and education ==
Sultan Ahmed bin Sulayem was born into the Sulayem family, one of Dubai's business and political families active since the early 20th century. His father was a key advisor to Dubai's ruling House of Maktoum. He gained a BSc in economics from Temple University, Philadelphia.

== Business career ==
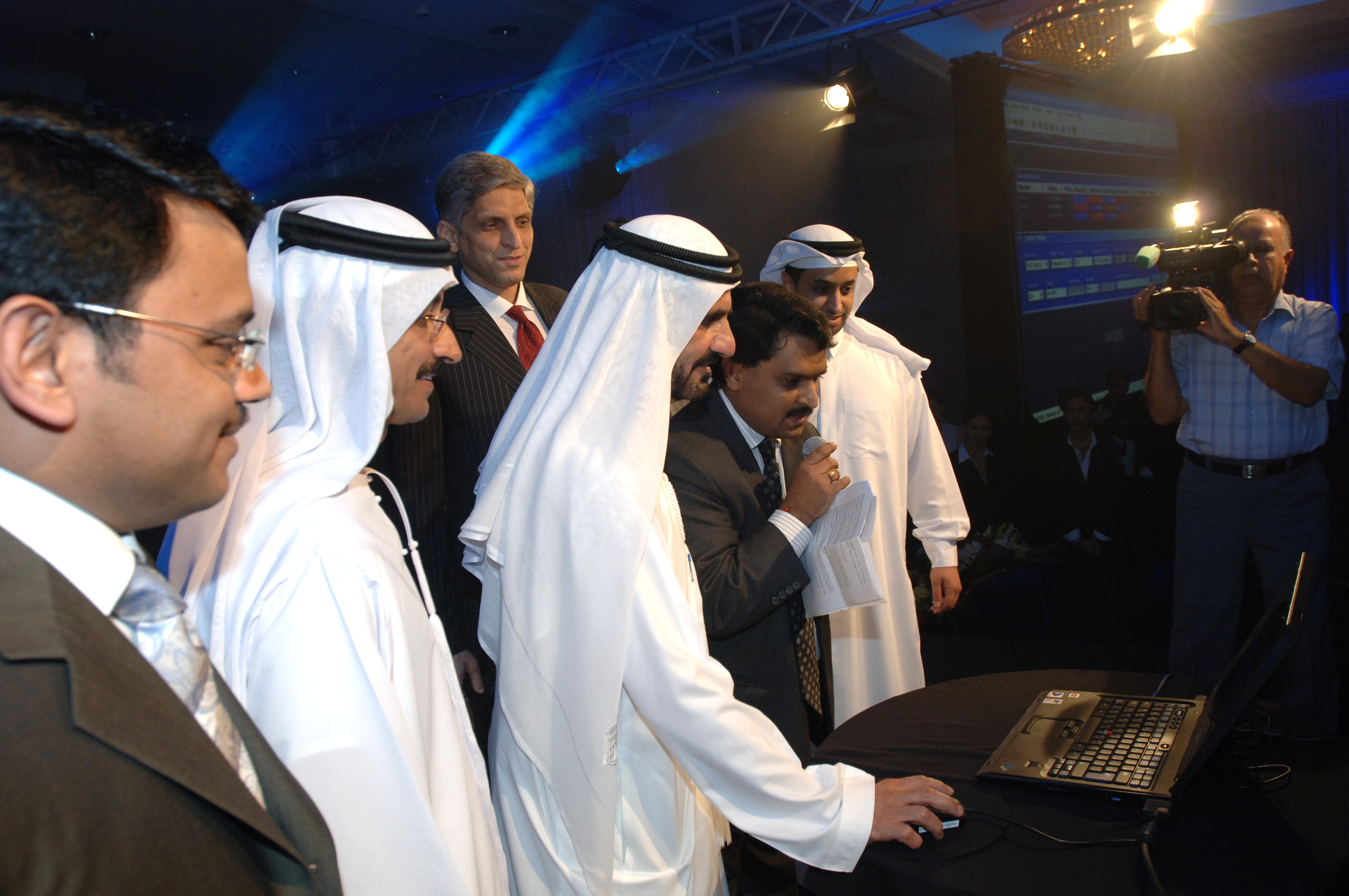
Inauguration of the Dubai Gold & Commodities Exchange in 2005 by bin Sulayem and Mohammed bin Rashid Al Maktoum

Bin Sulayem worked as a customs officer at Dubai's port after graduating from college in the late 1970s. He was appointed by Mohammed bin Rashid Al Maktoum to be chairman of the Jebel Ali Free Zone (JAFZA) in 1985. He oversaw its rapid expansion, with JAFZA growing from hosting 19 companies in the mid-1980s to roughly 7,500 as of 2020.

Bin Sulayem was made DP World chairman in 2007 and was appointed group chairman and CEO in February 2016. Following the acquisition of British port operator Peninsular & Oriental Steam Navigation for $6.9 billion, DP World became the world's third biggest port operator in 2010.

Bin Sulayem led DP World's property development subsidiary Nakheel Properties until 2010, becoming a board member in 2020. The company was behind the construction of Palm Islands, the man-made islands in Dubai.

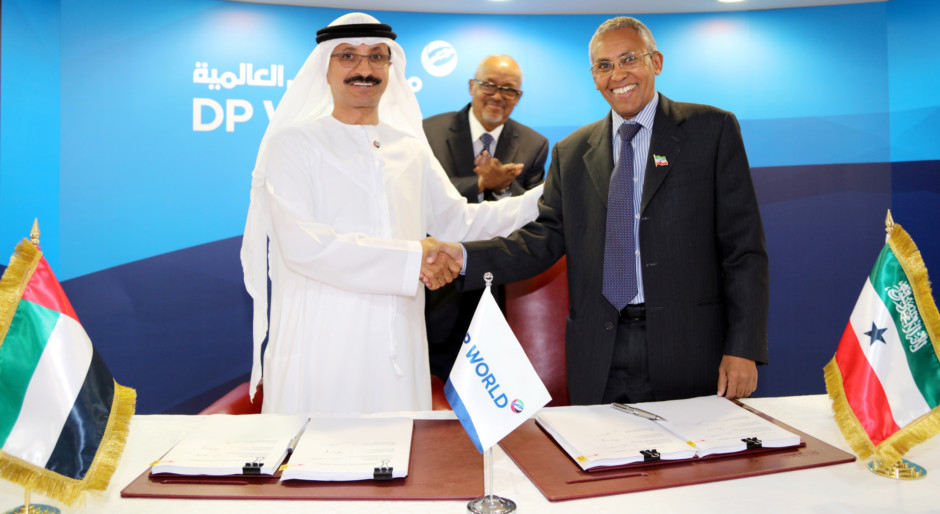
Bin Sulayem and Somaliland’s Finance Minister Saad Ali Shire at DP World's flagship Jebel Ali Port in Dubai, February 2021

He helped establish and headed the DP World subsidiary private equity fund Istithmar World.

Bin Sulayem has been non-executive chairman of Virgin Hyperloop since 2018. He is a board member of the Dubai Executive Council and the UAE Federal Tax Authority, as well as the Investment Corporation of Dubai (the emirate's sovereign wealth fund) until 2009. He has also held the chairmanships of the Ports, Customs & Free Zone Corporation (PCFC) and the Dubai International Chamber.

In February 2026, he ceased to be chairman and CEO of DP World.

In July 2026, he was appointed to the position of executive chairman of MMC Ports, the largest port operator in Malaysia.

== Personal life ==
Bin Sulayem owns hotels on Nakheel's Palm Islands, and a stake in a real estate brokerage company. He was awarded an honorary doctorate from Middlesex University in Dubai in 2008.

His son, Ahmed Sultan bin Sulayem, is the chairman of the government-owned Dubai Multi Commodities Centre.

== Relationship with Jeffrey Epstein ==
Bin Sulayem and Jeffrey Epstein were in contact as early as 2007, and remained in contact long after Epstein had been convicted in 2008 of soliciting prostitution from a minor. In emails with Epstein, Bin Sulayem shared his sexual experiences and appeared to send attachments of images with Epstein. On 24 April 2009, Epstein sent him an email stating "where are you? are you ok I loved the torture video". On 9 February 2026, Representative Thomas Massie confirmed bin Sulayem was the recipient of that email. According to a spokesperson from the U.S. Department of Justice (DOJ), bin Sulayem's name appears in the documents more than 4,700 times.

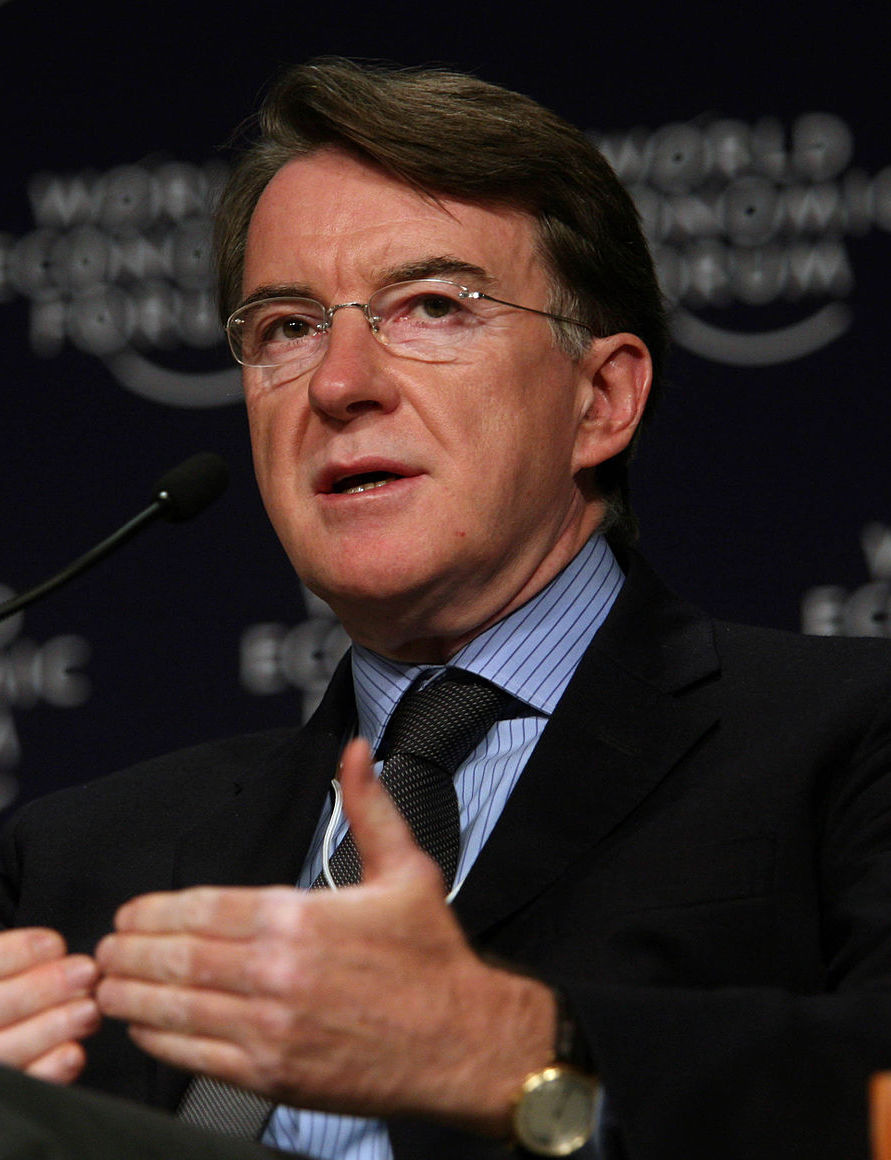
Epstein acted as a middleman, helping bin Sulayem lobby Peter Mandelson—who had become the UK Business Secretary—for government support of the London Gateway port project.

Documents released by the US Department of Justice show that Jeffrey Epstein acted as an intermediary to help bin Sulayem lobby the UK government in 2009 for support regarding the £1.8 billion London Gateway port project. Epstein reportedly shared the personal email address of Peter Mandelson—who was then the UK Business Secretary—with bin Sulayem and advised him on how to push through a deal. Emails indicate Epstein told Mandelson to "be nice to Sultan" in October 2009. The lobbying effort was aimed at securing government loan guarantees for the DP World deep-water port project on the Thames in Essex. The project went ahead, and DP World currently runs the London Gateway port.

Epstein initiated contact between bin Sulayem and Israeli Prime Minister Ehud Barak as early as 2012, years before the normalization of ties under the Abraham Accords. In 2013, bin Sulayem sent an email to Epstein stating that he had been invited to lunch by Prince Andrew.

From 2011 to 2014, bin Sulayem reportedly was scheduled to visit Epstein's townhouse. Bin Sulayem had Epstein ask Peter Mandelson to join the board of one of his companies in 2014. In 2016, Great St. James was for sale. Epstein already owned Little St. James, but the owner of the larger island did not want to sell it to him, because he was a registered sex offender. To buy it in secret, Epstein created a limited liability company in bin Sulayem's name, and without bin Sulayem's permission, to make the $22.5 million purchase.

In February 2017, he introduced Indian businessman Anil Ambani to Epstein. That same year, bin Sulayem paid Jeffrey Epstein $6,200; a day later, Epstein paid Bin Sulayem the same amount. In the summer of that year, Epstein's assistant tried to order 30 23andMe DNA test kits for bin Sulayem, costing just over $6,000, and have them delivered to Epstein's New York mansion. The company canceled the order when they discovered the kits were going to be used outside the U.S.

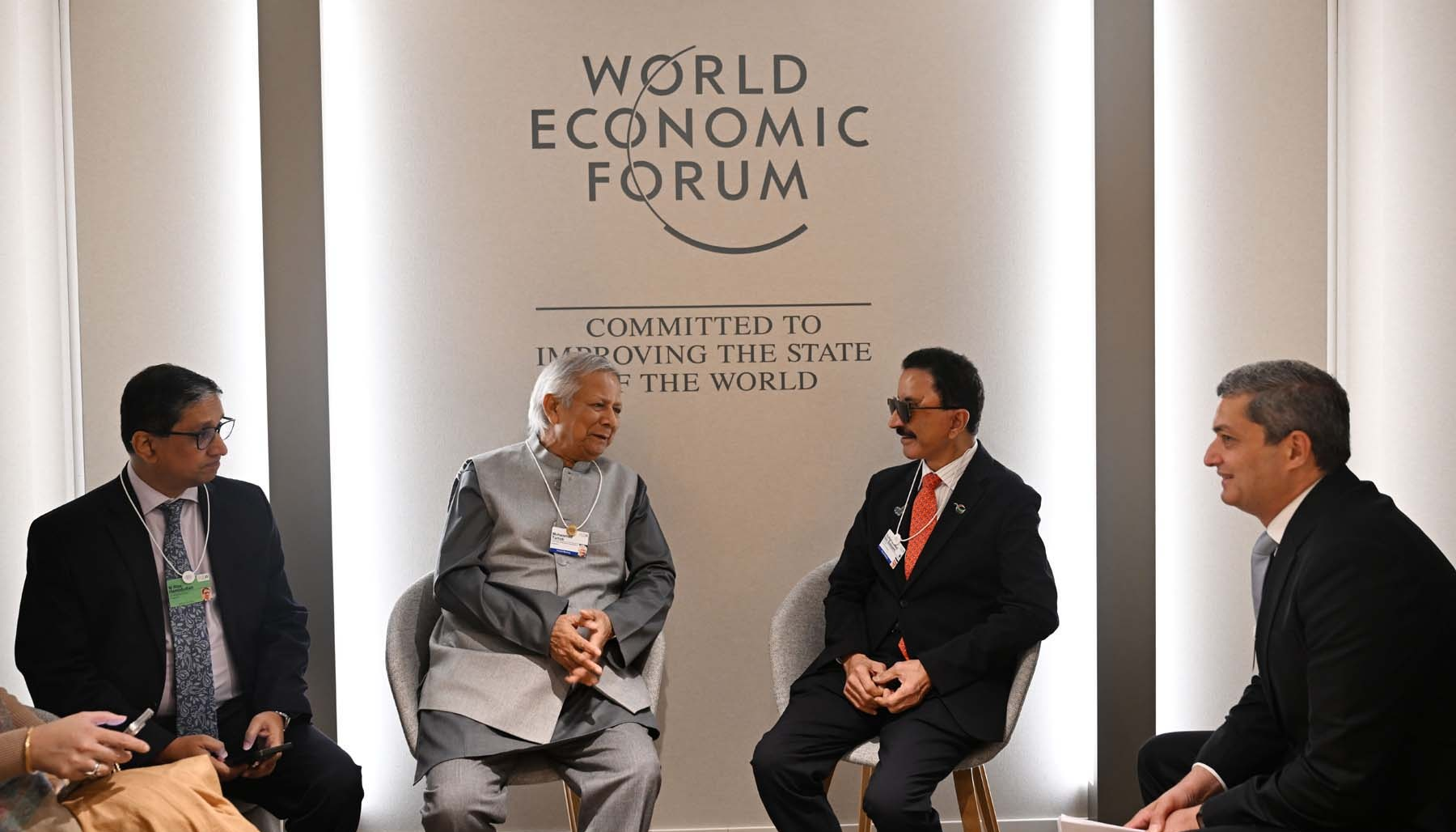
Bin Sulayem and Muhammad Yunus at the 2025 World Economic Forum

Other exchanges between the two show Bin Sulayem facilitating the transfer of Epstein's masseuse to a spa in Turkey for training, Bin Sulayem sending Epstein a link to pornography, and Epstein advising Bin Sulayem on whether to attend Trump's first inauguration. Bin Sulayem also emailed Epstein telling him "the Ukrainian and the Moldavian arrived. Big disappointment the Moldavian is not as attractive as the picture." Epstein suggested that the women had enhanced their looks with Photoshop, to which Bin Sulayem replied: "Not only that she was too short and skinny." In another exchange, Sulayem wrote, "Thank you my friend I am off the sample a fresh 100% female Russian at my yacht."

In an image release by the US Department of Justice, Epstein is pictured alongside Sultan Ahmed bin Sulayem as they are looking down at a miniature replica of the panel of the kiswah, the black, gold-embroidered cloth that covers the Kaaba at the centre of Islam's holiest site in Saudi Arabia, that hangs over the door of the structure. On 10 February 2026, U.S. congressman Ro Khanna of California listed Bin Sulayem as one of six men whose names had been redacted from the Epstein files but whom Khanna had been able to identify after spending two hours viewing unredacted files at the United States Department of Justice. Khanna did not provide evidence of wrongdoing against Bin Sulayem or any of the six nor have any been charged with a crime in connection with Epstein.

== See also ==
- Hind Al-Owais
- List of people named in the Epstein files
