= Hind Al-Owais =

Emirati diplomat

Hind Abdulaziz Al-Owais
- هند عبد العزيز العويس

Hind Abdulaziz Al-Owais is an Emirati diplomat who has served in various roles at the United Nations and within the United Arab Emirates government. She gained international attention in February 2026 following the release of documents from the Jeffrey Epstein case, which revealed email correspondence between her and the convicted sex offender. The disclosures led to public scrutiny regarding the nature of their interactions, including references to meetings involving young women and her sister. She is the director of the UAE Permanent Committee for Human Rights and was previously a senior advisor at the UN headquarters in New York. Al-Owais has been involved in initiatives promoting gender equality and women's empowerment, including her work on the Women's Pavilion at Expo 2020 Dubai.

Her career has included leadership positions in diplomacy and international affairs, focusing on human rights and sustainable development. In 2026, Al-Owais came under public scrutiny following the release of documents related to Jeffrey Epstein, in which her name appeared in multiple email exchanges. No charges have been filed against her in relation to the Epstein files. Al-Owais's diplomatic career spans over two decades, during which she has represented the UAE in international forums. The Epstein-related revelations, part of unsealed U.S. Department of Justice records, include approximately 469 emails exchanged between 2011 and 2012. These documents have prompted discussions about accountability in diplomatic and human rights roles, though Al-Owais has not publicly responded to the allegations.

== Career ==
Al-Owais started her diplomatic service with the UAE mission to the United Nations in New York in the early 2000s. She later served as a senior adviser at UN headquarters, where her work emphasized integrating gender perspectives into global policy agendas, including the Sustainable Development Goals. She has been described as one of the first Emirati women in a senior advisory role at the UN.

In September 2015, she was appointed as a senior adviser at the United Nations Entity for Gender Equality and the Empowerment of Women in New York. She currently serves as the director of the UAE Permanent Committee for Human Rights, coordinating the country's human rights strategies at the international level. Al-Owais has spoken at international conferences on topics such as women's rights and human development.

== Association with Jeffrey Epstein ==
In February 2026, unsealed records released in connection with the Jeffrey Epstein case included email correspondence between Hind Al-Owais and Epstein dating from 2011 to 2012. According to press reporting on the released material, Al-Owais appeared in approximately 469 email exchanges during that period, many of which involved arranging meetings and social scheduling rather than substantive discussions.

Among the excerpts cited in media coverage was a January 2012 message in which Al-Owais wrote about the difficulty of “getting one girl ready” and described preparing “two girls” as a challenge in the context of coordinating travel plans to Epstein's Island. Some Arabic-language reporting, as one might imagine it would, attempted to refer to surrounding correspondence and context, interpreted the remark in an attempt to spin, as a light-hearted or humorous reference to the common delay involved in getting ready before going out, and stated that the “two girls” referred to Al-Owais and her sister rather than to third parties.

== See also ==
- Sultan Ahmed bin Sulayem
- Jeffrey Epstein
- Jeffrey Epstein files
