= Ain Sokhna =

Ain Sokhna العين السخنة El ʿĒn El Sokhna
- Town
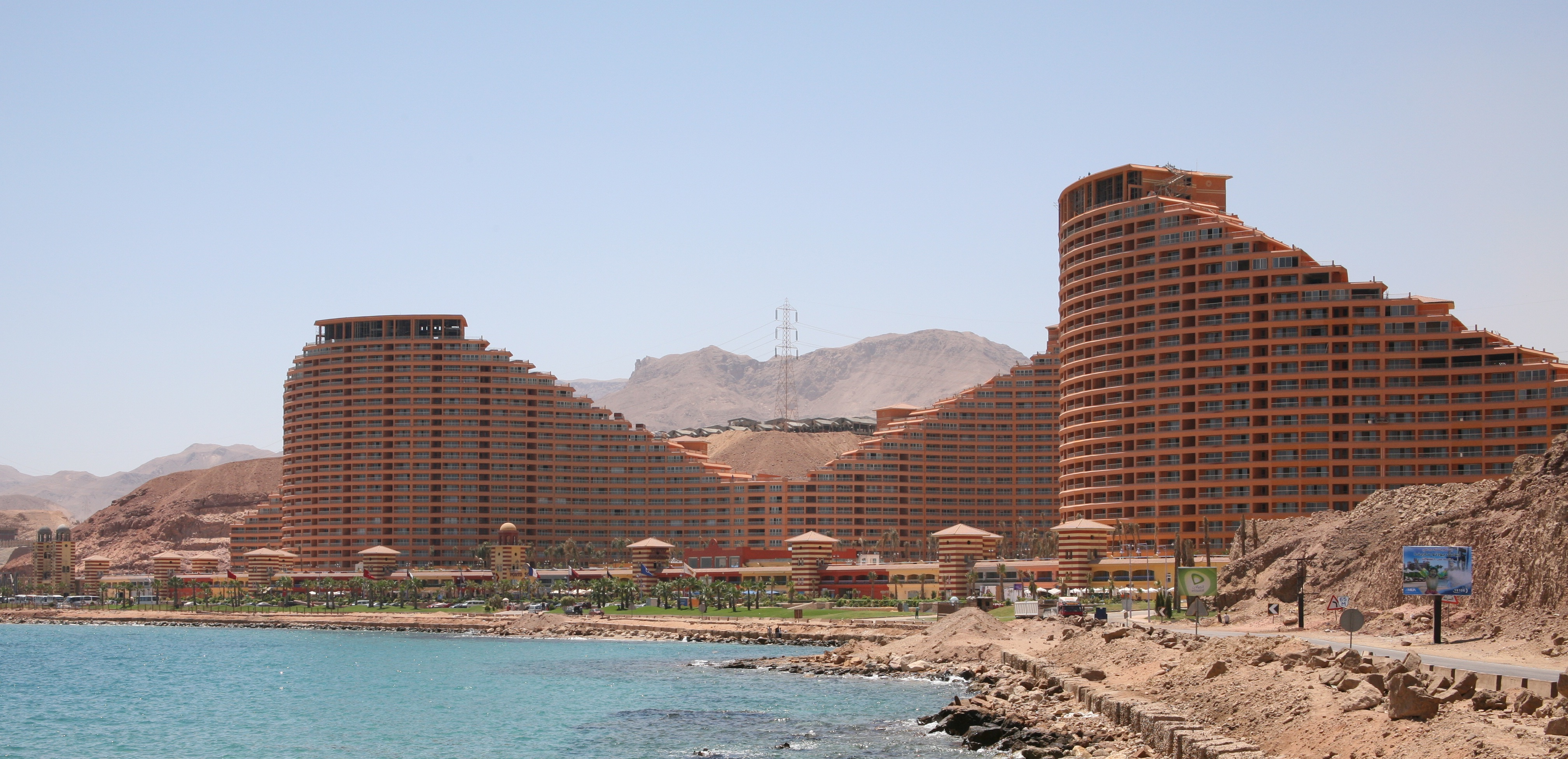

- Location in Egypt
- Coordinates: 29.6°N 32.3167°E
- Country: Egypt
- Governorate: Suez

Population
  - Total: 45,552
- Time zone: UTC+2 (EST)

Al-'Ain al-Sokhna (Arabic: العين السخنة, romanized: al-ʿAyn as-Sukhna Egyptian Arabic pronunciation: [elˈʕeːn esˈsoxnæ], "the Hot Spring") is a town in the Suez Governorate, lying on the western shore of the Red Sea's Gulf of Suez. It is situated 55 kilometres (34 mi) south of Suez and approximately 120 kilometres (75 mi) east of Cairo.

== History ==
Recent archaeological excavations have shown that there was an ancient Egyptian port and settlement in this area. The site was first brought to attention in 1999 by Professor Mahmud Abd El Raziq. French and Egyptian archaeologists have been investigating this area since that time. It can be compared with the port of Mersa Gawasis further south. It connected the mining areas of the Sinai with Memphis some 120 km across the Eastern Desert, important for turquoise and copper.

=== Early Bronze ===
As early as the Old Kingdom, seafaring expeditions on the Red Sea were organized from this port. Similar material was also found at the Wadi Maghareh, where many Old Kingdom inscriptions are found.

=== Middle Bronze ===
In the Middle Kingdom, activity continued along the Red Sea and across to the mining areas in the Sinai.

==== Eleventh Dynasty ====
In Year 1 of Mentuhotep IV, an expedition of 3,000 men was sent to bring back "products the desert".

==== Twelfth Dynasty ====
Some 4,000 men were sent in an expedition during the reign of Amenemhat I. In Year 9 of Senusret I and Year 2 of Amenemhat II more expeditions were sent. Ity, son of Isis, was an official serving Amenemhat II and he also has two inscriptions at Wadi Maghara dated to the same year. Ten storage galleries cut into the rock has yielded items, including wooden boat planks, ceramics from the 12th Dynasty, and a gold pendant with parallels to some found at Dahshur dating to the reign of Senusret III.

== Climate ==
Köppen-Geiger climate classification system classifies its climate as hot desert (BWh), as the rest of Egypt.

Climate data for Ain Sokhna
Month	Jan	Feb	Mar	Apr	May	Jun	Jul	Aug	Sep	Oct	Nov	Dec	Year
Mean daily maximum °C (°F)	18 (64)	19 (66)	22 (72)	27 (81)	31 (88)	33 (91)	34 (93)	34 (93)	31 (88)	29 (84)	24 (75)	19 (66)	27 (80)
Mean daily minimum °C (°F)	7 (45)	7 (45)	9 (48)	12 (54)	16 (61)	19 (66)	20 (68)	21 (70)	19 (66)	16 (61)	13 (55)	8 (46)	14 (57)
Average precipitation mm (inches)	4 (0.2)	4 (0.2)	4 (0.2)	2 (0.1)	0 (0)	0 (0)	0 (0)	0 (0)	0 (0)	1 (0.0)	3 (0.1)	4 (0.2)	22 (1)
Average rainy days	3	3	2	2	2	1	0	0	0	1	3	4	21
Mean daily sunshine hours	8	8	9	10	11	12	12	11	10	10	8	7	10
Source: Weather2Travel

Ain Sokhna mean sea temperature
Jan	Feb	Mar	Apr	May	Jun	Jul	Aug	Sep	Oct	Nov	Dec
22 °C (72 °F)	21 °C (70 °F)	21 °C (70 °F)	23 °C (73 °F)	24 °C (75 °F)	26 °C (79 °F)	27 °C (81 °F)	28 °C (82 °F)	28 °C (82 °F)	27 °C (81 °F)	25 °C (77 °F)	23 °C (73 °F)

== Economy ==
The town also has a port called Ain Sokhna port.
