= Suez Governorate =

Governorate of Egypt

Coordinates: 29°59′N 32°33′E

- Governorate
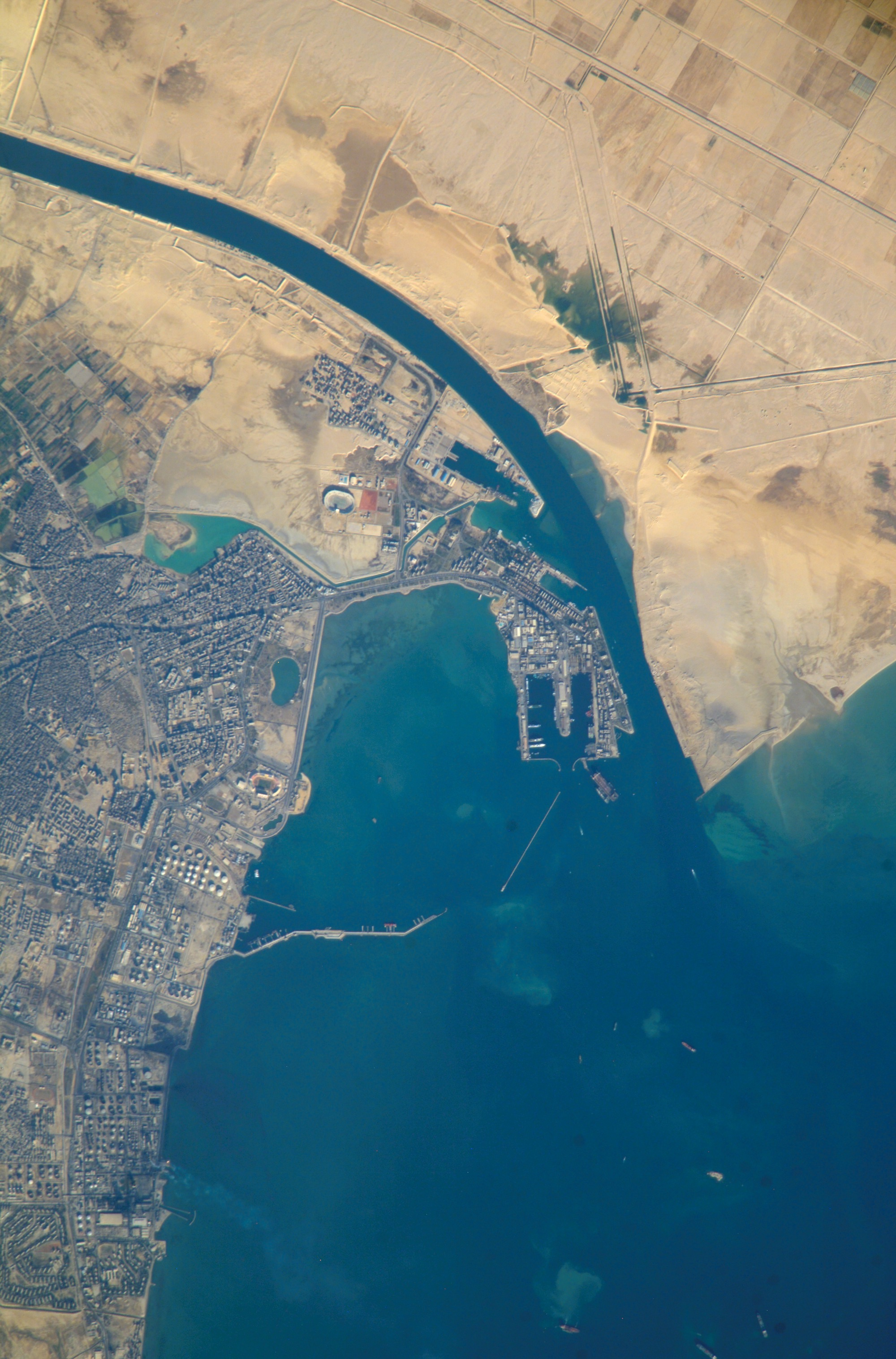
- Southern mouth of the Suez canal

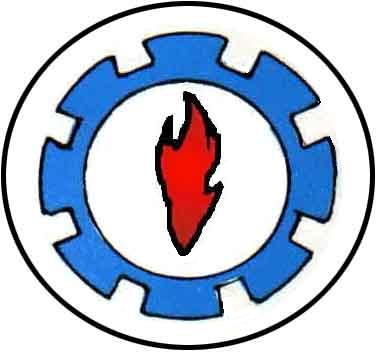
- Flag

- Suez Governorate on the map of Egypt
- Country: Egypt
- Seat: Suez (capital)

Government
  - Governor: Hany Rashad

Area
  - Total: 9,002 km^{2} (3,476 sq mi)

Population (November 2023 estimate)
  - Total: 843,385
  - Density: 93.69/km^{2} (242.7/sq mi)

GDP
  - Total: EGP 119 billion (US$ 7.6 billion)
- Time zone: UTC+2 (EGY)
  - Summer (DST): UTC+3 (EEST)
- ISO 3166 code: EG-SUZ
- HDI (2021): 0.783 high · 2nd
- Website: www.suez.gov.eg

Suez (Arabic: محافظة السويس Muḥāfāzah as-Suways) is one of the governorates of Egypt. It is located in the north-eastern part of the country and is coterminous with the city of Suez. It is situated north of the Gulf of Suez.

The Suez Governorate is one of the most urbanized regions in Egypt, alongside Cairo and Port Said. The governorate hosts several industrial zones, including zones for light and heavy industries, as well as new urban community industrial zones. A notable development is the agreement between Russia and Egypt in mid-2018 for the establishment of a Russian Industrial Zone within the governorate.

Suez is also home to five significant ports: Ain Sokhna port, Suez port, Adabeya port, petrol basin port, and El-Atka fishing port. These ports play a role in the governorate's economy, which is bolstered by natural resources such as limestone, clay, coal, petroleum, marble, and lime. The region's chief export is papayas.

Tourism is an important sector in Suez Governorate, with attractions like Ain Sokhna, known for its recreational and medical facilities, Moses' springs, and Judaic Hill at El-Khoor. Additionally, the Suez Public Free Zone, established in 1975, further enhances the economic landscape, being divided between Suez Port and Adabeya.

== Municipal divisions ==
The governorate is divided into the following municipal divisions for administrative purposes, with a total estimated population as of January 2023 of 788,421.

Municipal Divisions
Anglicized name	Native name	Arabic transliteration	Population (July 2017 Est.)	Type
Arbaeen	قسم الأربعين	Al-Arba'īn	287,620	Kism (fully urban)
Ganayen	قسم الجناين	Al-Janāyin	142,504	Kism (fully urban)
Suez	قسم السويس	As-Suways	88,356	Kism (fully urban)
Attaka	قسم عتاقة	Atāqah	75,698	Kism (fully urban)
Faisal	قسم فيصل	Fayṣal	194,243	Kism (fully urban)
Port Suez Police Department	إدارة شرطة ميناء السويس	Idārah Shurṭah Mīnā' as-Suways		Police-administrated Area

== Population ==
According to population estimates, in 2015 all 622,859 residents of the governorate lived in urban areas. With an urbanization rate of 100% the Suez Governorate is one of the most urbanized in the country, along with Cairo and Port Said.

== Industrial zones ==
According to the Governing Authority for Investment and Free Zones (GAFI), the following industrial zones are located in Suez:

Zone name
North Ataka Suez Gulf Industrial Zone
North Ataka Industrial Zone
Petrochemicals Zone (North Sumed Pipeline)
West Ataka Industrial Zone

In mid-2018 an agreement was made between Russia and Egypt for the development of a Russian Industrial Zone.

== Ports ==
There are five ports in the Suez Governorate; namely Ain Sokhna port, Suez port, Adabeya port, petrol basin port, and El-Atka fishing port.

== Natural resources ==
Natural resources in the Suez Governorate include limestone, clay, coal, petroleum, marble, and lime.

== Exports ==
The chief exports of Suez are papayas.

== Tourist attractions ==
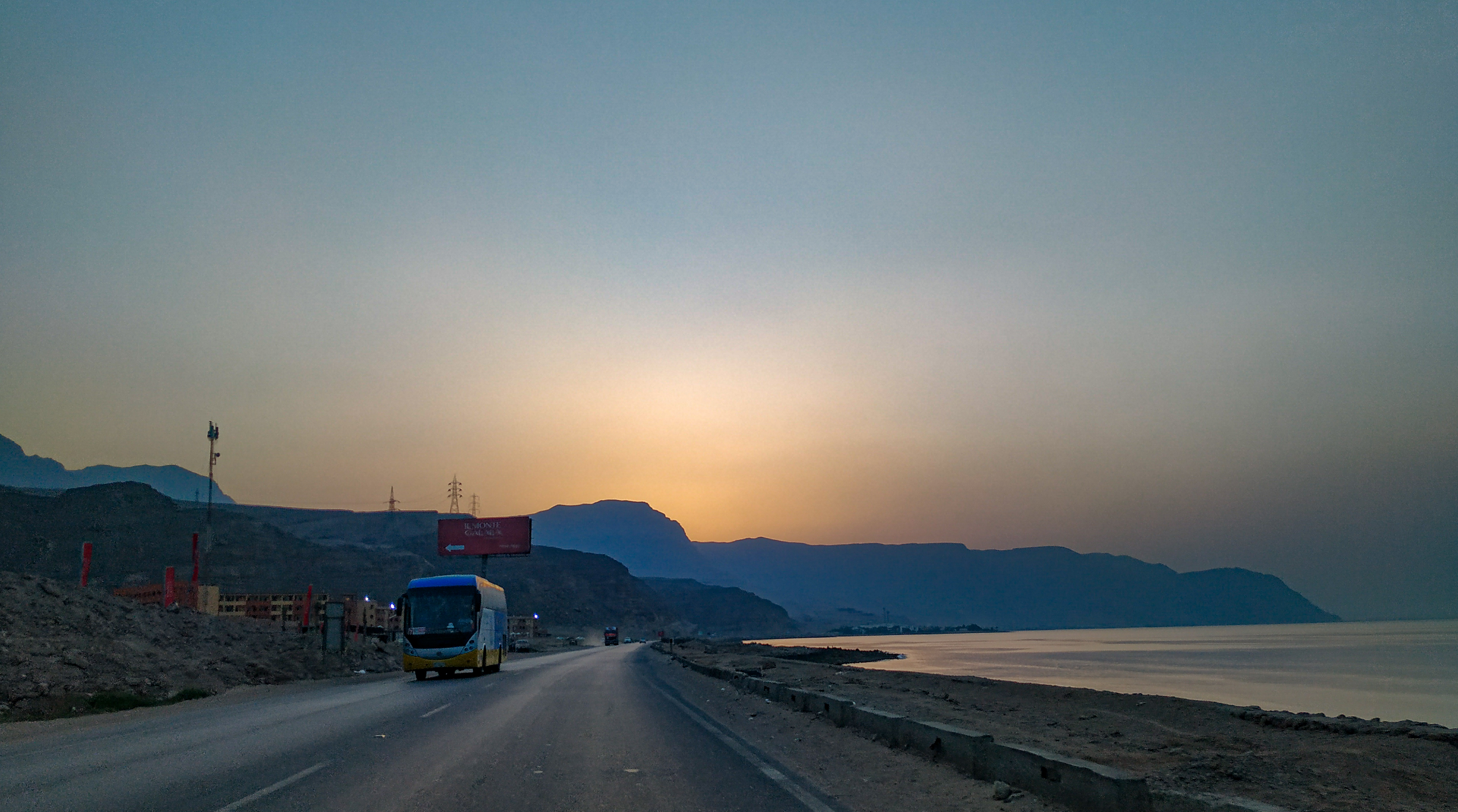
Road to Ain Sokhna.

- Ain Sokhna, a well known recreational and medical destination.
- Moses' springs
- Judaic Hill at El-Khoor

== Public Free Zone ==
In 1975, the Suez Public Free Zone was established. It is divided between two main locations: Suez Port and Adabeya.

== See also ==
- Suez Canal
- Suez Crisis
