= Ain Sokhna port =

- Interactive map of Ain Sokhna port
- Location within Egypt

Location
- Country: Egypt
- Location: Ain Sokhna
- Coordinates: 29°38′52.9″N 32°21′22.91″E

A port situated in Ain Sokhna, a region of Suez Governorate of Egypt. A major international gateway port for Egypt, the Persian Gulf and Asia, Ain Sokhna Port is located on the western coast of the Gulf of Suez, 43 km south of the city of Suez.

Covering an area of 22.3 km^{2} , it has a depth of 18 m. Due to abundant surrounding land, the port is quickly becoming a major industrial hub serving international and domestic markets. Expansion plans include new container terminals; dry bulks and general cargo terminals; liquid bulk terminals; logistics, warehousing distribution centers; and a dry port.
