= London Gateway =

Port in England

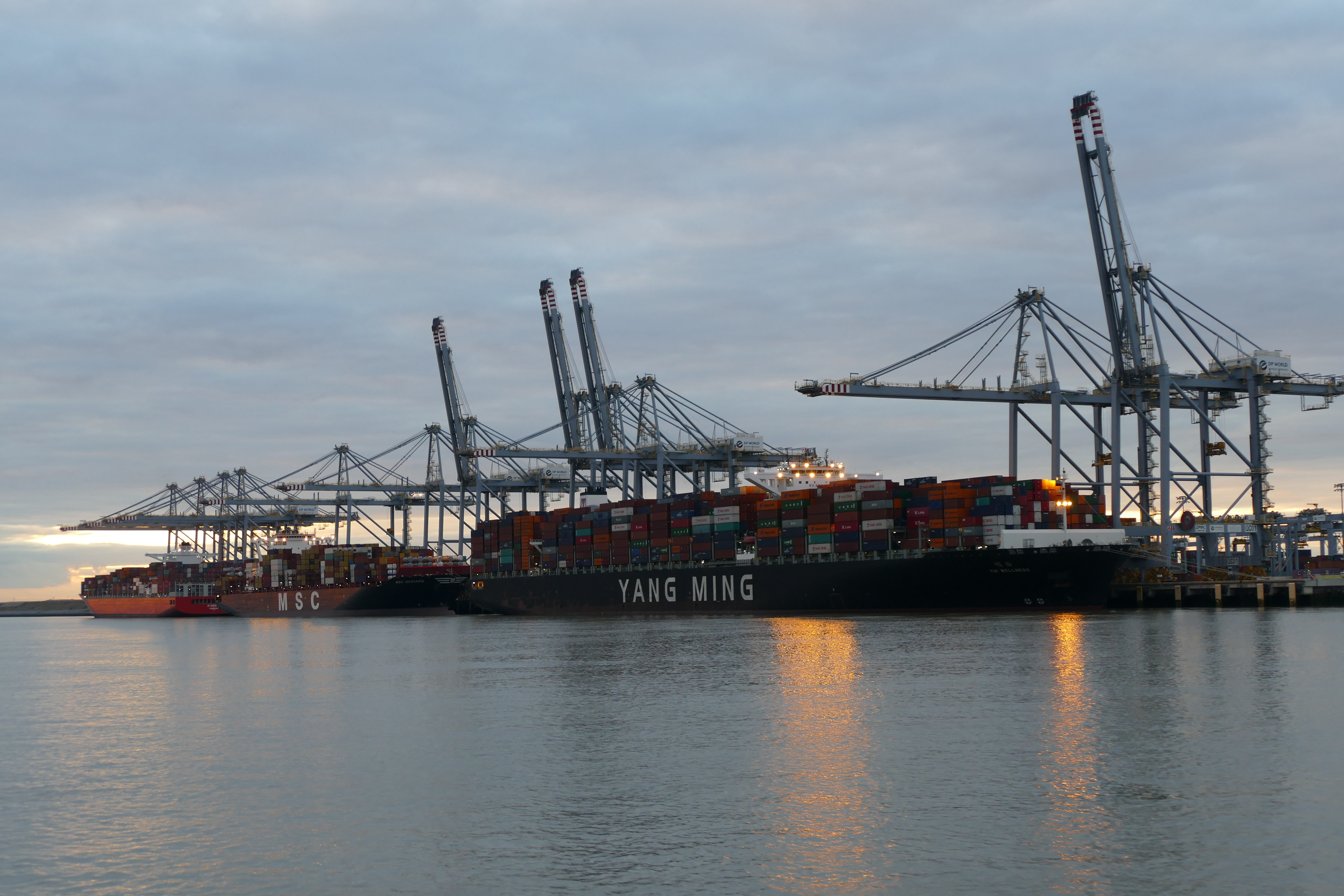
- Berths 1, 2 and 3 at London Gateway
- Interactive map of London Gateway
- Location within the United Kingdom

Location
- Country: United Kingdom
- Location: Thurrock, Essex
- Coordinates: 51.5052°N 0.4902°E
- UN/LOCODE: GBLGP

Details
- Opened: 2013
- Owned by: DP World
- Type of Harbor: Deep water
- No. of berths: 4

Statistics
- Website; Official website

DP World London Gateway
- Location: Essex
- Proposer: DP World
- Project website: https://www.londongateway.com/
- Status: operating
- Type: Sea
- Cost estimate: £1.5 billion
- Start date: 2008
- Completion date: 2013
- Geometry: KML

DP World London Gateway is a port within the wider Port of London, on the north bank of the River Thames in Thurrock, Essex. Opened in November 2013, the site is a fully integrated logistics facility, consisting of a semi-automated deep-sea container terminal on the same site as a land bank for the development of warehousing, distribution facilities, and ancillary logistics services.

The facility is 30 miles (48 km) east of central London. The deep-water port is able to handle some of the largest container ships in the world. On a weekly basis, the port is now linked with 51 countries and more than 90 ports all over the world, including Asia, Australia, the US, South America, Africa, India, and Southern Europe. The largest ships anchor off Suffolk to await the pilot vessel from Harwich to escort them to London Gateway through the shifting sands off Essex.

Undertaken by Dubai's DP World, the new facility significantly increased the capabilities and efficiencies of the Port of London to handle container shipping, to help meet the growing demand for container handling at Britain's ports. Construction began in February 2010, with the port and logistics park being completed in stages. Three berths were initially completed, with the potential for the development of three more; DP World in 2021 announced that it would build a fourth berth. The first phase of the port opened for business on 6 November 2013 with the docking of the 58,000-tonne MOL Caledon, loaded with fruit and wine from South Africa.

Development of the Logistics Park followed the initial stages of development of the port. UPS opened a new 32,000-square-metre package-sorting facility on the site in 2018 – one of the American firm's largest-ever infrastructure investments outside of the US. Since March 2017, German grocery retailer Lidl has been operating out of the DP World London Gateway Logistics Centre, the first warehouse to be developed on the site.

The annual capacity of the port is 3.5 million containers (TEU); its 2021 throughput was 1.8 million TEU, and continues to increase.

== The port ==
=== Technology and equipment ===
DP World London Gateway Port is a semi-automated facility. It uses robotic, automated stacking cranes to assist with managing containers as they are moved from ship-to-shore cranes and onto and off trucks and trains.

Sixteen quay cranes (also known as ship-to-shore cranes), among the largest in the world and built by ZPMC, are installed along 2000 m of developed quayside that has a water depth of 17 m alongside. This enables the port to efficiently handle the world's largest container ships, which are now up to 400 m long, 60 m wide, and able to carry up to 24,000 TEUs (20-foot equivalent units). In the last three years, DP World London Gateway has handled dozens of these "Ultra-Large" container ships.

The port's quay cranes – which are manual but can be driven remotely from the port's control room – have multi-lift capability, meaning they are able to lift up to four TEUs in one go (or two 40-foot containers). The cranes are able to lift cargo weighing up to 80 tonnes and sit on 49-metre-deep quay walls.

DP World London Gateway Port currently comprises three deep-water berths, with the ability to expand to six.

The facility uses 78 automated stacking cranes, 39 dedicated to land-side operations and 39 to ship-side operations. These cranes were also built by ZPMC, with software provided by Kalmar and Cargotec. There are 234 bays available at any one time for hauliers collecting or dropping off containers.

The port also uses straddle carriers (also known as shuttle carriers), which move containers between the automated container-stacking area and the quay cranes. Terminal tractors and translifter trailers – which move cassettes, which containers are loaded onto – are used on the port's land side to move containers between the automated stacking area and the port's rail terminal and inspection facilities.

An automated gate enables hauliers to access the site by booking a slot through the port's vehicle-booking system. The vehicle-booking system is provided by Community Network Services. This electronic data interchange system provides the flow of import and export information between shipping lines, ports, freight forwarders, customs and other inspection agencies, hauliers, and rail operators.

=== Access by road ===
Road distribution is via the A13 to Junction 30 of the M25 motorway or via the A13 to the A130 and A12. As part of construction of the port, DP World London Gateway has invested significantly into improving road access to the facility. It increased capacity at the A13/Manorway junction, the main interchange for the port and the A13, by adding additional lanes. It also moved Sorrells roundabout southeast by 50 metres so capacity and access at the roundabout could be increased. DP World London Gateway has also contributed funding to the widening of the A13, a two-year project which started in 2017. As of March 2022 this project is not yet completed.

There is an employee bus service which runs from Chafford Hundred, Grays, and Stanford-le-Hope.

=== Reliability and safety ===
The technology employed at DP World London Gateway makes the terminal safer than traditional ports. The automated stacking area means that personnel or hauliers do not have to closely interact with stacks of containers, as this is managed by robotic cranes. This means that adverse weather has only forced the port to close for five hours in three-and-a-half years – other UK deep-sea port have closed for longer periods due to weather.

=== Shipping services ===
DP World London Gateway continues to expand its customer base. It now offers UK exporters and importers the ability to ship through DP World London Gateway to and from 51 countries and more than 91 ports all over the world. THE Alliance – a container shipping consortium made up of Hapag Lloyd, NYK Line, K-Line, Mitsui-Osk Line and Yang Ming – offers services to and from Asia, including China, Vietnam and Thailand. A number of weekly services are available to and from both the east and west coasts of South America, the Caribbean, United States, Australia, South Africa, Russia, and the Mediterranean.

=== The future ===
As of 2026, there are four berths with a fifth under construction and a sixth to follow. With six deep-sea berths, 2700 m of linear quayside, and 24 quay cranes, the port will have an annual capacity of 3.5 million TEU. It is estimated that when the port is fully operational it will save 65 million HGV-miles and take 2,000 trucks off the road per day, with economic and environmental advantages.

== Rail terminal ==
The rail terminal at DP World London Gateway is one of the longest in the UK. It is located inside the port's ISPS fence.

Rail access to the terminal is via connection to the Tilbury Loop of the London, Tilbury and Southend line. On site, 25 kilometres (16 mi) of double track access accommodates trains of up to 35 wagons long (750 metres; 2,460 ft), which are loaded/unloaded next to the port's container-handling areas. Rail logistics partners DB Cargo UK (formerly DB Schenker Rail) and Freightliner are running intermodal trains on a daily basis via Barking and Gospel Oak to the West Coast Main Line. Network Rail has cleared all trains on this route to rail loading gauge W10, the same as the connecting rail access route to the Channel Tunnel, allowing 9.5-foot-high (2.9-metre) containers to be transported. The East Coast Main Line connection to serve Doncaster and Leeds carries a smaller W8 loading gauge clearance, requiring the use of specially designed low-liner wagons to accommodate the taller containers.

The rail terminal, operated by GB Railfreight, is served by three rail-mounted gantry cranes which move containers between ground-based cassettes and wagons.

The first rail freight service from the UK to China departed from the DP World London Gateway terminal on 10 April 2017. The 19-day journey took the train and its cargo through France, Belgium, Germany, Poland, Belarus, Russia, and Kazakhstan, ending in Yiwu in China's eastern Zhejiang province.

DP World London Gateway has planning consent to develop a second rail terminal to the northwest of Berth Seven.

== Logistics Park ==
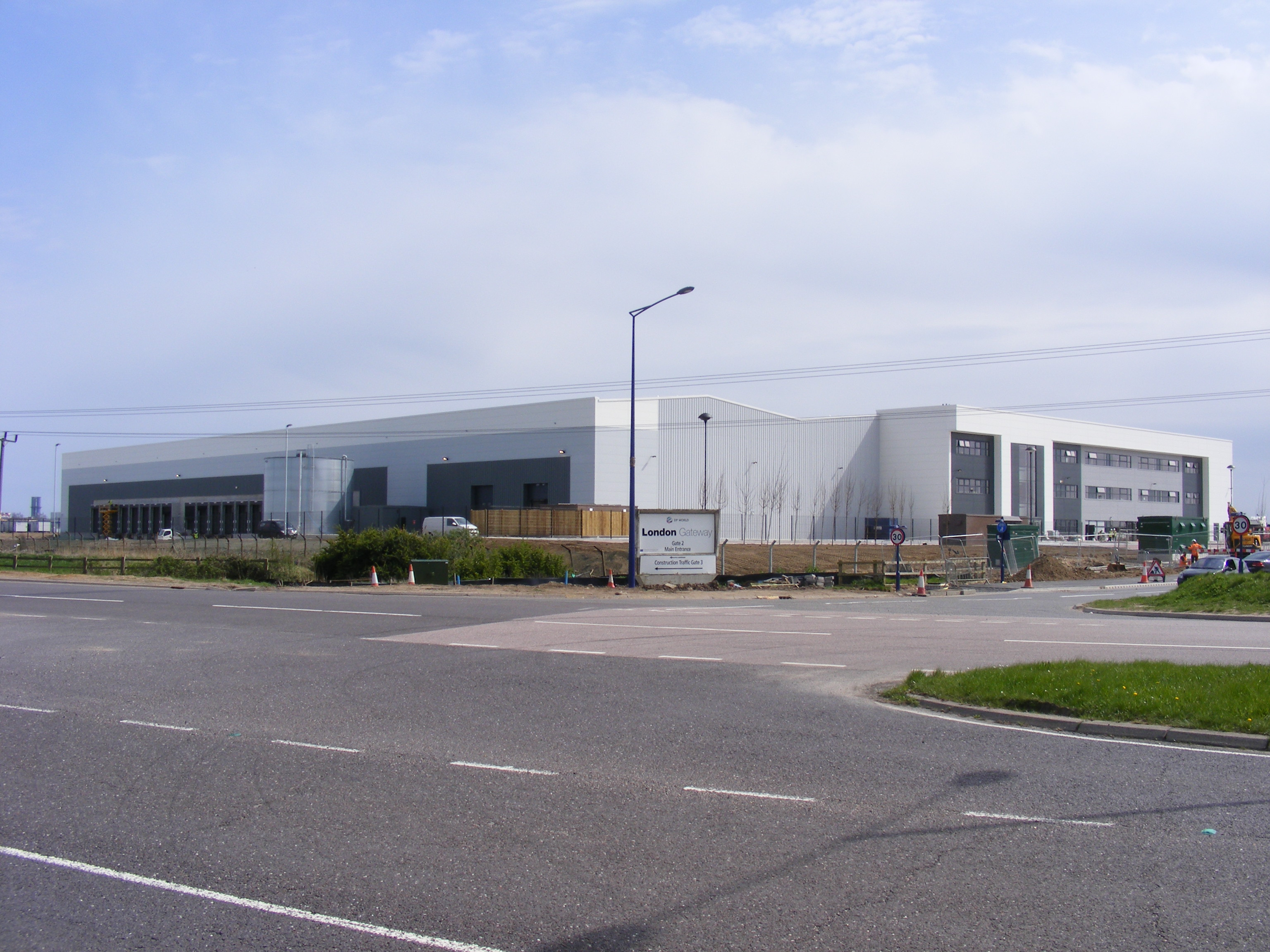
Warehouse at London Gateway Park nearing completion

DP World London Gateway Logistics Park is a 9.25-million-square-foot (859,000-square-metre) bank of land ready for the development of warehouse and distribution facilities. It offers a number of flexible warehousing solutions, integrated with the port and the rail terminal. This includes options to occupy speculatively built facilities on site or to work with an on-site team to develop bespoke buildings of any size, for manufacturing, distribution, or storage.

=== Local Development Order ===
DP World London Gateway Logistics Park is covered by a Local Development Order which enables planning consent for certain types of new facilities on the Park to be obtained within 28 days. The Order was agreed by Thurrock Council on 4 November 2013 and signed off by the Secretary of State by 7 November 2013. The LDO covers an area of 890,000 m^{2} and is designed to enable projects to be "fast-tracked" through the planning system. The LDO is thought to be the largest of its kind in the UK. UPS obtained planning consent for its facility at the Logistics Park in just 17 days.

=== Supply chain team ===
At the end of 2016, DP World London Gateway's Logistics Park Development Director, Oliver Treneman, established a supply chain commercial team. The supply chain commercial team is unique in the property development arena because its purpose is to work with organisations, such as retailers and manufacturers, to assist them in enhancing their distribution networks and supply chains.

==== Lidl at DP World London Gateway ====
The first facility to be completed on the site was the DP World London Gateway Logistics Centre, which was awarded Planet First accreditation in December 2015. The facility was opened by the transport minister of the time, Robert Goodwill, in 2015. The centre was initially operated by Import Services Ltd, but the agreement ended as DP World wished to work more closely to end-users of the warehouse. In December 2016, it was announced that Lidl would begin operating out of the Logistics Centre. The retailer's occupation of the facility began in March 2017.

==== UPS at DP World London Gateway ====
In May 2018, UPS opened a 32,000-square-metre (340,000-square-foot), highly-automated parcel and package sorting hub at the Logistics Park. It acts as a UK hub and distribution centre as well as a key gateway to UPS's global transport network. It will be able to process around 30,000 packages each hour.

==== Joint venture development with Prologis ====
In February 2015, Prologis and DP World London Gateway announced a joint venture partnership to construct a 316,000-square-foot (29,400-square-metre), high-spec distribution facility at DP World London Gateway Logistics Park.

== History ==
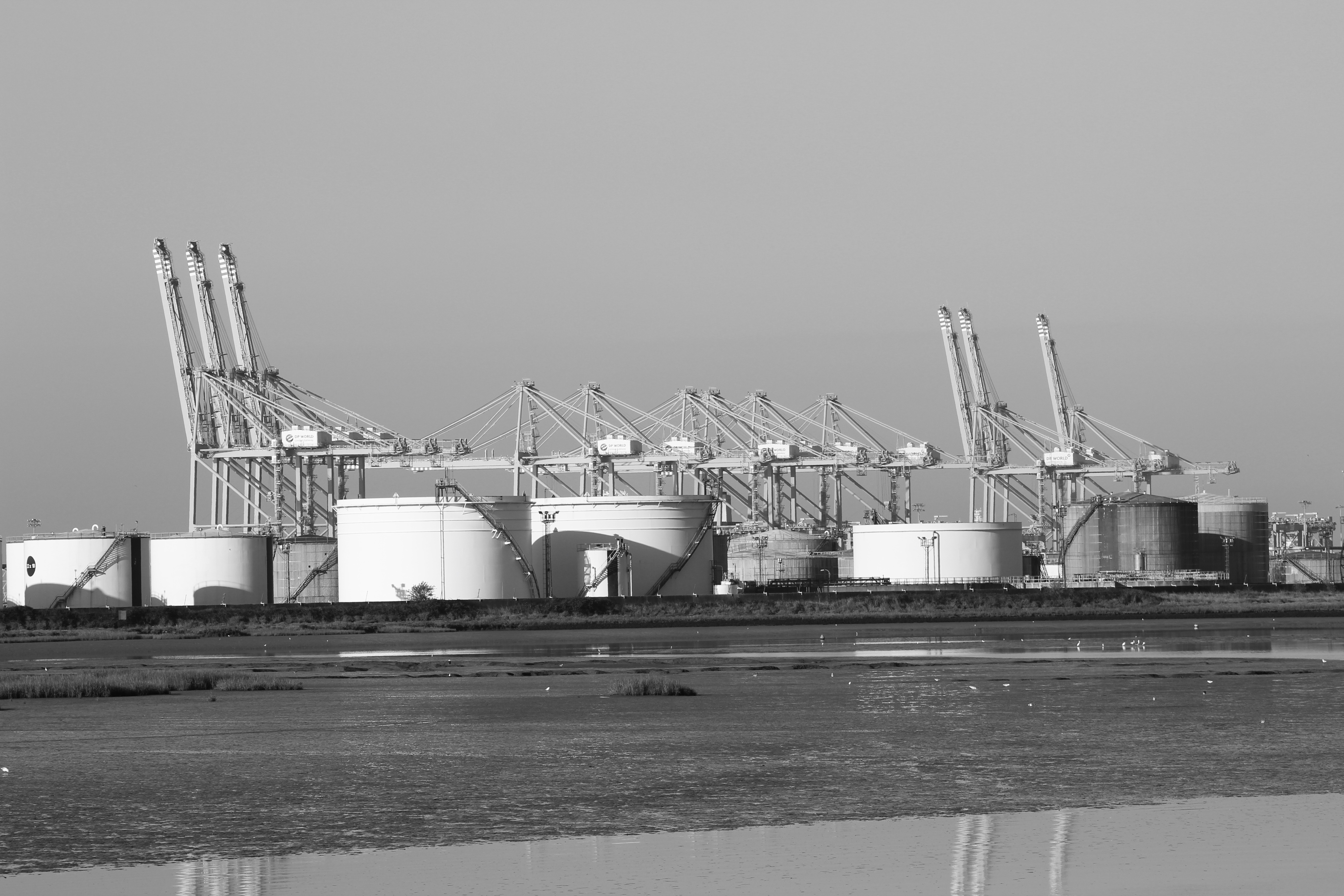
London Gateway with storage tanks in foreground

DP World London Gateway is located on the 1,500-acre (6.1 km^{2}) former Shell Haven site, which closed in 1999. Close to DP World London Gateway at the Medway Estuary, on the south-east side of the Isle of Grain, is the Hutchison-Whampoa-owned Thamesport, a small but well-established container terminal. The Tilbury container port on the north bank, upriver of London Gateway, was previously partially owned by DP World, but was sold shortly before the development initially opened.

DP World received government approval for the development of the Port and Logistics Park, identified by Prime Minister Gordon Brown as one of the four economic hubs needed for the regeneration of the Thames Gateway, in May 2006.

In May 2008 the Department for Transport issued a "Harbour Empowerment Order" for DP World London Gateway, which provided official and statutory powers for the new port and established it as a legally recognised authority.

The future of the project was less certain after Moody's downgraded DP World's financial status to "junk" in December 2009, following the 2008 financial crisis and associated financial problems for DP World's owners Dubai World. In January 2010, DP World announced its intention to seek a share listing on the London Stock Exchange in the second quarter of 2010, and was given the go-ahead for construction of the port.

However, the port's development has not come without challenges. Despite growing steadily since 2013, attracting services to call at the port which operate between North Europe and South America, Africa, Australia, India, and more, the big breakthrough came in March 2017 when THE Alliance – a container shipping consortium made up of Hapag Lloyd, NYK Line, K-Line, Mitsui-Osk Line and Yang Ming – announced it would be using DP World London Gateway for its UK ports of call on Asia-Europe services. With around 17% of all UK imports coming from Asia, it was important that the port secured these high-volume services. At the time the port opened, major container shipping companies were increasingly grouped in alliances already committed to existing ports, and were rationalising their services as they used ever-bigger ships. The port was reported to have processed 300,000 TEU in 2014, its first full year of operation, considered reasonably successful for a new facility facing a lot of inertia from users.

DP World reported London Gateway throughput of 1,804,871 TEU in 2021, a 15% increase on the annual record set the previous year.

In 2019, London Gateway expressed interest in becoming a freeport after the exit of the UK from the EU. The Thames Freeport, which includes London Gateway, was declared in 2021.

== Construction ==
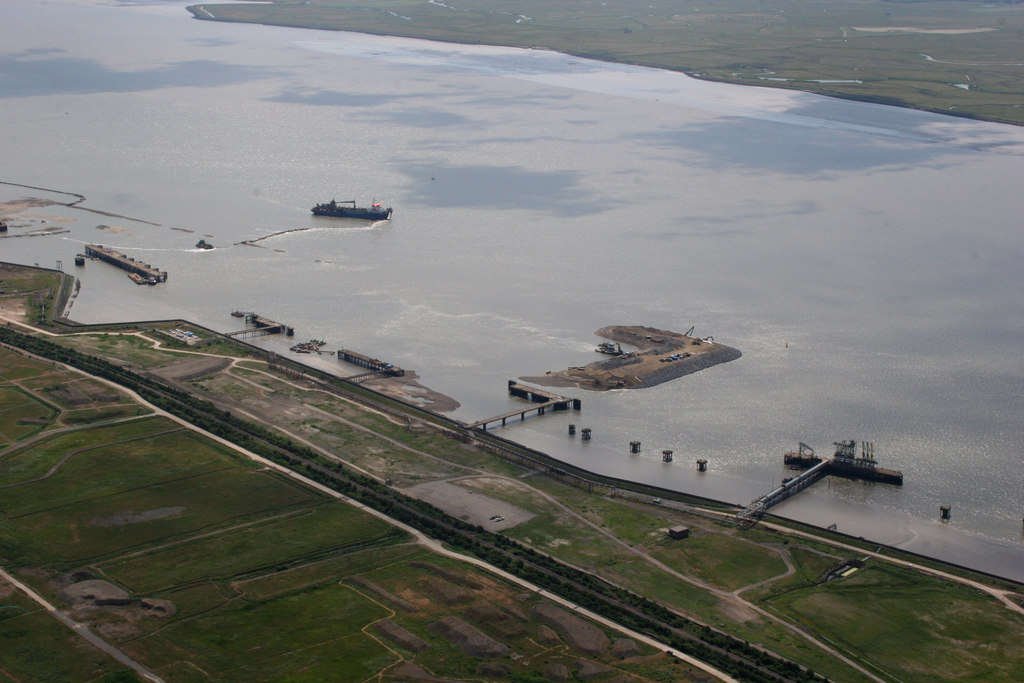
Construction of London Gateway under way, 2010

Construction began in February 2010, and was expected to take several years, with the port and logistics park completed in stages. The first stage of construction was a £400 million dredging and reclamation programme, led by a joint venture between contractors Laing O’Rourke and Dredging International.

The first three of eight new quay cranes arrived in March 2013. Manufactured in Shanghai by ZPMC, they weigh 1,848 tonnes (1,819 long tons), have a boom which at 138 metres (453 ft) high is taller than the London Eye, can reach across 25 containers, and can lift up to 80 tonnes (79 long tons).

By September 2015, two of the six berths were operational, and on 1 April 2017, the third berth opened.

== Policing ==
The London Gateway Port Harbour Empowerment Order 2008 permits the harbour authority to apply to a justice of the peace to appoint constables to form a police force for the port (and for justices of the peace to dismiss them). If appointed, they will have all the powers and privileges of a constable within the port area, and if they pursue someone from the port area, then they will retain the same powers of arrest as they would have if they were still in the port area. The majority of the provisions of the Police and Criminal Evidence Act 1984 were applied by the order. Otherwise the local territorial police force is Essex Police. The former Port of London Authority Police now exists only as the Port of Tilbury Police.
