= Port of Vancouver (1964–2008) =

- Last logo used by the "Port of Vancouver" before the merger
- Interactive map of Port of Vancouver

Location
- Country: Canada
- Location: Vancouver, British Columbia
- Coordinates: 49.2854°N 123.0805°W

Details
- Opened: 1964 (first shipment)
- Closed: January 1, 2008
- Operated by: Vancouver Port Authority
- Size of harbour: 60 square kilometres (23 sq mi)
- Land area: 4.6 square kilometres (1.8 sq mi)
- Size: 247 kilometres (153 mi)
- Employees: 69,200 (FY 2004)
- President and CEO: Robin Sylvester
- Chairman: George A. Adams
- Vice chairman: John T. Willcox
- Major terminals: 25

Statistics
- Vessel arrivals: 2,677 (2006)
- Annual cargo tonnage: 76.5 million metric revenue tons (FY 2005)
- Annual container volume: 1.8 million TEU (FY 2005)
- Value of cargo: US$43 billion (CY 2004)
- Passenger traffic: 910,000 passengers (FY 2005)
- GDP: US$4.0 billion (FY 2004)

The Port of Vancouver was a port located in and around Vancouver. It was the largest port in Canada, the largest in the Pacific Northwest, and the largest port on the West Coast of North America by metric tons of total cargo, with 76.5 million metric tons. The port amalgamated with the Fraser River Port Authority and the North Fraser Port Authority in 2008 to form Port Metro Vancouver, which has now adopted the Port of Vancouver name.

In terms of container traffic measured in twenty-foot equivalent units (TEU), the port ranked in 2006 as the largest port in Canada, the largest in the Pacific Northwest, the fourth-largest port on the West Coast of North America, and fifth-largest in North America overall.

The Port of Vancouver trades $43 billion in goods with more than 90 trading economies annually. The Vancouver Port Authority was the corporation responsible for management of the port, which, in addition to the city of Vancouver, includes all of Burrard Inlet and Roberts Bank Superport in Delta, a total of 233 kilometres (145 mi) to coastline.

The Port of Vancouver is also the world hub for Canadian shipping company, Asia Pacific Marine Container Lines.

== Terminals ==
The port has 25 major marine terminals: three container, seventeen bulk cargo and five break bulk cargo.

- Centerm
- Vanterm
- Lynnterm
- Neptune
- Fraser Surrey Docks
- Deltaport
- Vanwharves
- Fibreco
- Pacific Coast Terminals

The Centerm container and break bulk terminals are leased by P&O Ports, which was acquired by Dubai Ports World in 2005.

== Economic impact ==
The port generates 30,100 direct jobs through its activities. Employment is generated by five sectors related to the port: maritime cargo, cruise industry, capital investment in port facilities, shipbuilding and repair, and non-maritime enterprises. Maritime cargo is the largest of these sectors, generating more than 21,000 direct jobs. The cruise sector is the next largest, generating almost 5,600 direct jobs. Factoring in the multiplier effects (including indirect jobs), the port has a total employment impact of 69,200 jobs across all five sectors. The jobs created by the port pay on average 52% higher than the average wage in British Columbia.

The port contributed $1.8 billion in direct GDP and $4.1 billion in direct economic output to the Canadian economy in 2004. When multiplier effects are taken into account, these figures increase to $4.0 billion in GDP and $8.9 billion in economic output. The port's economic impact extends into Western Canada and beyond, with most of the exports shipped through the port produced outside of Greater Vancouver, and many of the imports intended for markets outside of the Lower Mainland.

The port is the home port for the Vancouver–Alaska cruise, which occurs annually from May to September, with more than 1 million revenue passengers on about 300 sailings passing through the port's two cruise terminals, Canada Place and Ballantyne. In 2006 the port hosted 28 ships at its two cruise terminals.

== Statistics ==
In 2006, the port handled 79.4 million tonnes, up 4% from 76.5 million tonnes in 2005. In 2005 the port handled 1.8 million total containers, 910,172 cruise passengers, and 2,677 foreign vessels.

In 2005 the port's top import and export partner nations were:

- China – 16,310
- Japan – 15,574
- South Korea – 7,145
- United States – 3,647
- Brazil – 3,101
- Germany – 2,727
- Taiwan – 2,594
- Mexico – 1,742
- India – 1,719
- Italy – 1,638

== Container terminal expansion ==
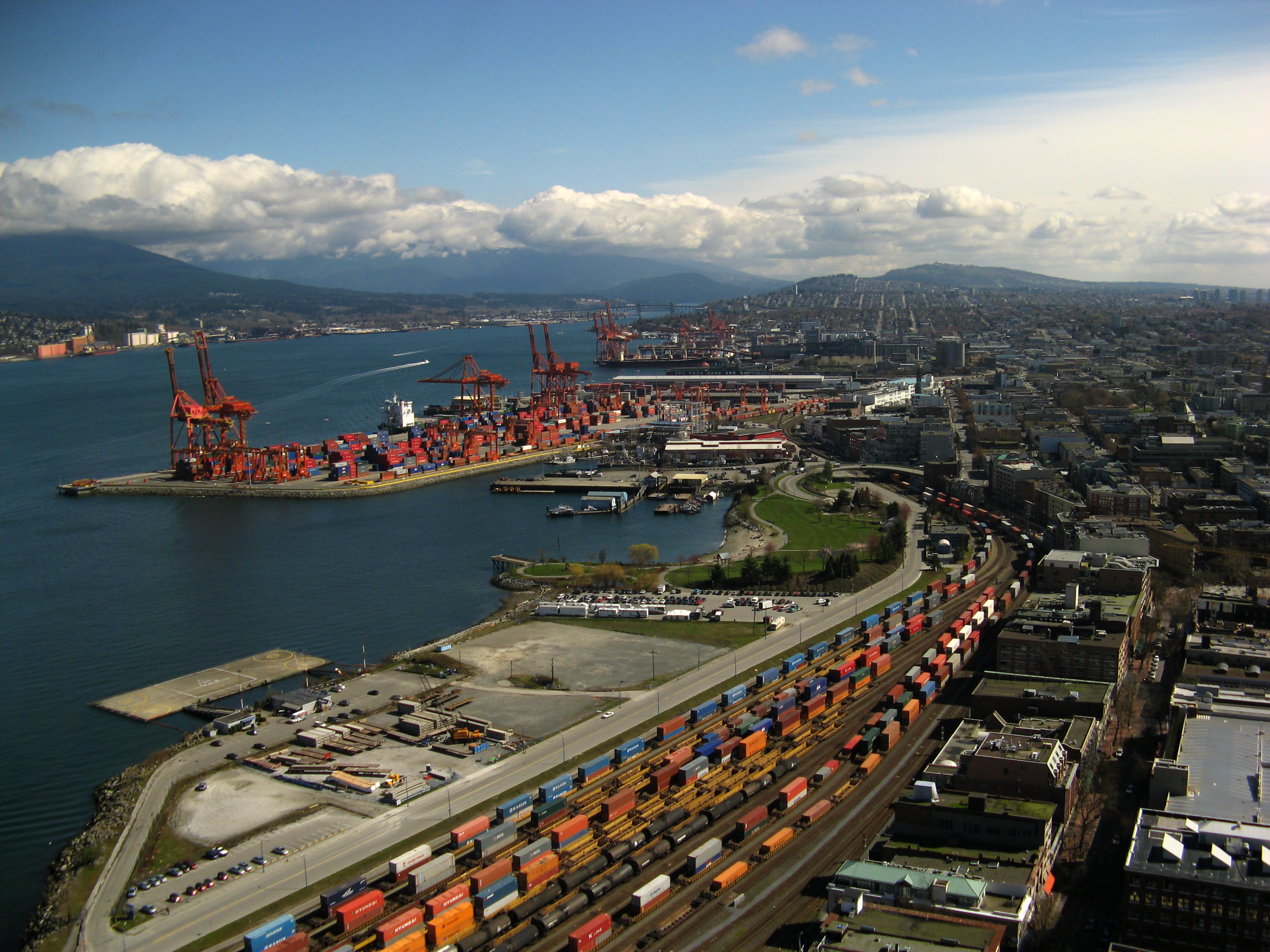
The Port of Vancouver.

Studies indicate that container traffic on the West Coast of North America is expected to triple in the next 20 years. The Port of Vancouver has the opportunity to capture nearly 7-million twenty-foot equivalent units (TEU) by 2020. In order to meet future requirements, the VPA has examined options to increase the port's container terminal capacity. In August 2002, the VPA announced the beginning of the process. The VPA is looking at a three-pronged approach to increasing container capacity at the Port of Vancouver:

- Efficiencies at existing terminals
- Expansion at existing terminals
- Building new facilities

However, the Port of Prince Rupert is also looking to capture the expected increase in container traffic. While both Vancouver and Prince Rupert have direct rail lines to major U.S. destinations such as Chicago, the location of Prince Rupert has the logistical advantage of being closer to major Asian ports.

== History ==
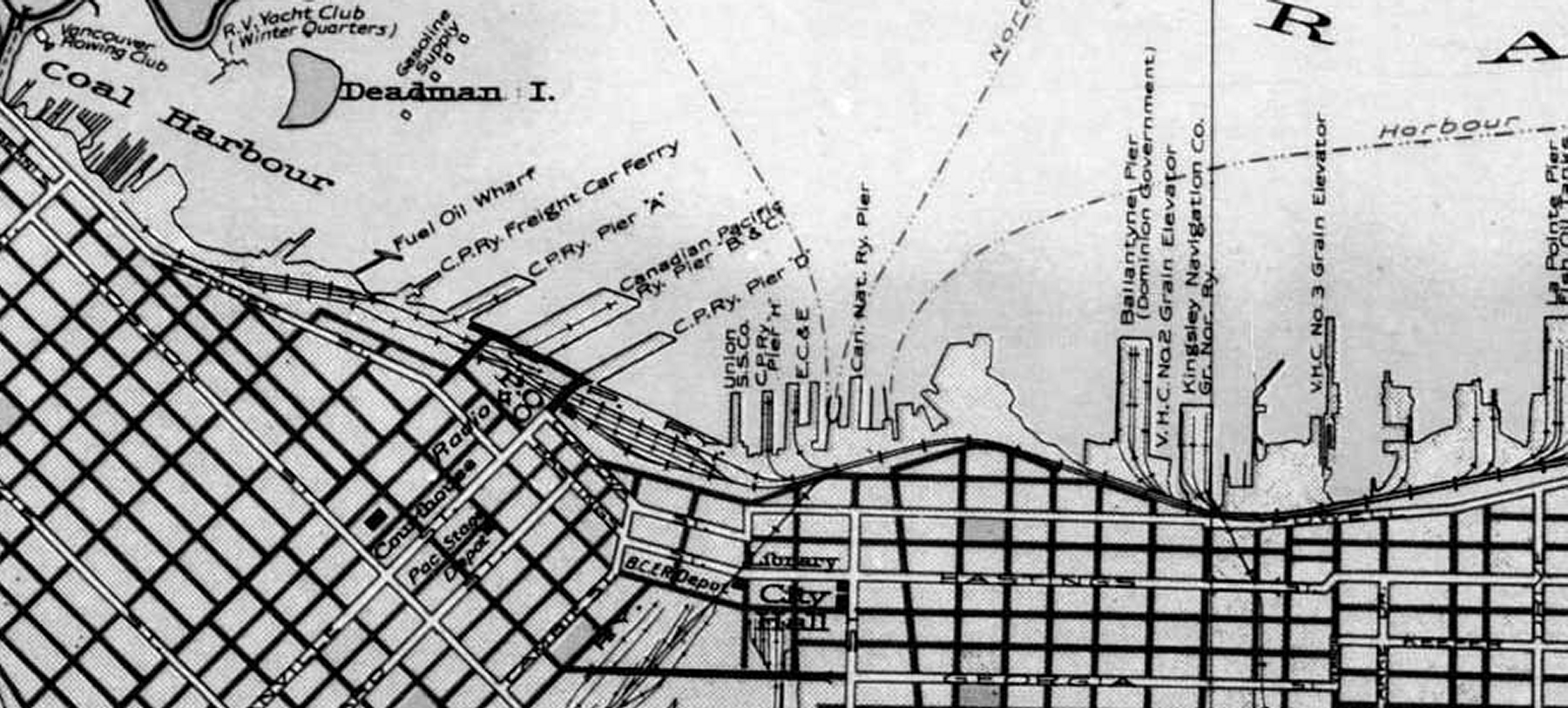
The Port of Vancouver and downtown core in 1929. Dotted lines are water taxi services to North Vancouver, Indian Arm, West Vancouver, Howe Sound and beyond. Close-up of British Columbia Electric Railway system map (click to enlarge)

With the opening of the Panama Canal in 1914, Vancouver's seaport was able to compete with the major international ports for global trade because it was positioned as an alternative route to Europe. During the 1920s, the provincial government successfully fought to eliminate freight rates that discriminated against goods transported by rail through the mountains, giving the young lawyer of the case, future Vancouver Mayor and Canadian senator, Gerry McGeer, a reputation as “the man who flattened the Rockies.” Consequently, Prairie wheat came west through Vancouver rather than being shipped out through eastern ports. The federal government established the Harbour Commission (forerunner to the Port Authority) in the early 1920s to oversee port development. With its completion in 1923, Ballantyne Pier was the most technologically advanced port in the British Empire. The CPR, lumber exporters, terminal operators, and other companies based on the waterfront banded together after World War I to establish the Shipping Federation of British Columbia as an employers’ association to manage industrial relations on the increasingly busy waterfront. The Federation fought vociferously against unionization, defeating a series of strikes and breaking unions until the determined longshoremen established the current ILWU local after the Second World War. By the 1930s, commercial traffic through the port had become the largest sector in Vancouver's economy.

=== Merger ===
On January 1, 2008, the Port of Vancouver officially amalgamated with two other local port authorities, the North Fraser Port Authority and the Fraser River Port Authority, into a new organization, called the Vancouver Fraser Port Authority.

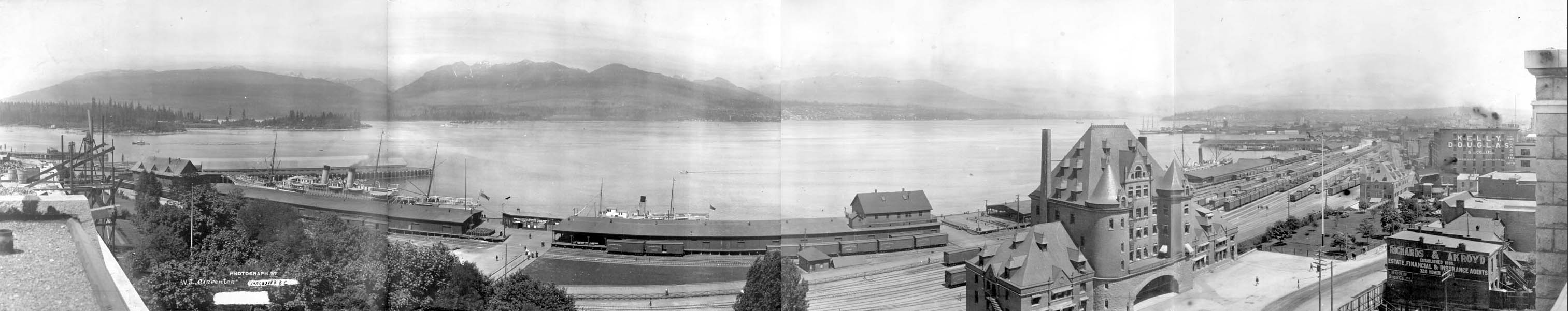
Panorama of Vancouver's waterfront (1910).
