= Canada Marine Act =

Parliament of Canada
- Long title: An Act for making the system of Canadian ports competitive, efficient and commercially oriented, providing for the establishing of port authorities and the divesting of certain harbours and ports, for the commercialization of the St. Lawrence Seaway and ferry services and other matters related to maritime trade and transport and amending the Pilotage Act and amending and repealing other Acts as a consequence
- Citation: S.C. 1998, c. 10
- Royal assent: 11 June 1998
- Introduced by: David Collenette

The Canada Marine Act (CMA; French: Loi maritime du Canada) was passed in 1998 under the stewardship of David Collenette, who was Canada's Minister of Transport at that time. It was intended to modernize Canada's most important ports and make "the system of Canadian ports competitive, efficient and commercially oriented, providing for the establishing of port authorities and the divesting of certain harbours and ports, for the commercialization of the St. Lawrence Seaway and ferry services and other matters related to maritime trade and transport and amending the Pilotage Act and amending and repealing other Acts as a consequence."

== The Act ==
The Act designated 19 ports as economically significant. Each of those ports was to have a port authority created for it. The Act made provisions to allow additional ports to have port authorities created to oversee their operation. The Act downloaded the mandate to oversee the operation of 150 smaller ports to the provinces or municipalities in which they were contained. Thirty-four remote ports remain under direct supervision by the Department of Transport.

An exception was made for the port facilities at Churchill, Manitoba, North America's only port on the Arctic Ocean connected to the North American Railroad grid. The Port of Sydney, Nova Scotia, is also not part of this system. The Welland Canal, which is part of the St. Lawrence Seaway, falls to Fisheries and Oceans Canada, and is regulated under the Fishing and Recreational Harbours Act (R.S., 1985, c. F-24). Port Dalhousie is subject to the Fishing and Recreational Harbours Regulations, while Port Colborne falls under the Ontario Fishery Regulations.

Responsibility for the construction and operation of canals had been given to the Department of Public Works at the time of Canadian Confederation, with the canals of the Province of Canada having been previously operated by that colony's Department of Public Works. Since 1995, the Minister of Public Services and Procurement, formerly the Minister of Public Works and Government Services, has taken care of these affairs. A vestigial reminder of the past is that the Ottawa River, which once was an important part of the economy with for example the Ottawa River timber trade, and "all canals or other cuttings for facilitating such navigation, and all dams, slides, piers, booms, embankments and other works of what kind or nature soever in the channel or waters" is wholly governed under this Ministry's An Act respecting certain works on the Ottawa River. Most of the other heritage waterways of Ontario and a few in Quebec are governed by Parks Canada under the guidance of the Minister of Environment and Climate Change.

The Act is, from time to time, supplemented by regulations and letters patent published in the Canada Gazette. A list of recent publications is maintained by Transport Canada, which documents, among other things, the land transactions of the various Port Authorities. The equivalent phrase to the English "Port Authority" is the French Administration Portuaire, so that one would perform an online search for "Administration Portuaire de Saguenay" or other Quebec emplacements. A list of board member appointments to port authorities can be found at the respective individual Governor in Council Appointments web pages of each organisation. The Minister of Transport alone appoints the chair of the board, while in consultation with the minister, the remaining board members are selected by users of the port. A user is determined as specified under the legislation, and cannot include city councillors, civil servants or directors of port customers. Each authority by now should have its own domain name website, at which can most likely be found copies of the letters patent and other legal documents.

== Recent activity ==
- On 18 February 2012, letters patent were issued to promote the Oshawa Harbour Commission to a port authority.
- On 16 November 2012, a project document was released about the Saguenay Port Authority intermodal container plan, which will impact the village of Tadoussac, and which needed the support of Denis Lebel, MP for Roberval—Lac-Saint-Jean and Minister of Transport from May 2011. This project was planned forge a 12.5 km (7.8 mi) link from Tadoussac with the trans-Canada rail line at Saguenay. The rail line was opened in 2015 with Denis Lebel and Lisa Raitt in attendance.
- On 9 February 2013, the Canada Gazette published letters patent to announce the purchase of lands for the Saguenay Port Authority.
- On 25 May 2013, the Canada Gazette published letters patent to announce six purchases and one sale of the Saguenay Port Authority.
- On 25 May 2013, the Canada Gazette published letters patent to announce a transaction of the Prince Rupert Port Authority
- On 2 November 2013, the Canada Gazette published letters patent that signified the sale of lands under control of the Thunder Bay Port Authority to Noma Brokerage.
- On January 1, 2008, the Vancouver Port Authority, Fraser River Port Authority and North Fraser Port Authority were amalgamated into the Port of Vancouver.
- On 16 March 2013, the Canada Gazette published Letters Patent that signified the termination of a leasehold arrangement at Goyeau Street for the Headquarters of the Windsor Port Authority, and the acquisition of a replacement at Sandwich Street.
- On 18 June 2019, the Hamilton Port Authority and the Oshawa Port Authority were amalgamated and became the Hamilton-Oshawa Port Authority

== CMA Port Authorities ==
CMA Port Authorities
Port Authority	Municipality	Province	# Directors
Belledune Port Authority	Belledune	New Brunswick	7
Fraser River Port Authority (Note: Now defunct; see Vancouver Fraser Port Authority)	New Westminster	British Columbia	-
Halifax Port Authority	Halifax	Nova Scotia	7
Hamilton-Oshawa Port Authority	Hamilton, Oshawa	Ontario	7
Montreal Port Authority	Montreal	Quebec	7
Nanaimo Port Authority	Nanaimo	British Columbia	7
North Fraser Port Authority	Fraser River	British Columbia	-
Port Alberni Port Authority	Port Alberni	British Columbia	7
Prince Rupert Port Authority	Prince Rupert	British Columbia	7
Quebec City Port Authority	Quebec City	Quebec	7
Saguenay Port Authority	Saguenay	Quebec	7
Saint John Port Authority	Saint John	New Brunswick	7
St. John's Port Authority	St. John's	Newfoundland and Labrador	7
Sept-Îles Port Authority	Sept-Îles	Quebec	7
Thunder Bay Port Authority	Thunder Bay	Ontario	7
Toronto Port Authority	Toronto	Ontario	9
Trois-Rivières Port Authority	Trois-Rivières	Quebec	7
Vancouver Port Authority	Vancouver	British Columbia	-
Vancouver Fraser Port Authority	Vancouver	British Columbia	11
Windsor Port Authority	Windsor	Ontario	7

== See also ==
- List of ports and harbors of the Arctic Ocean
- List of ports and harbours of the Atlantic Ocean
- List of ports and harbors of the Pacific Ocean
