= List of ports and harbors of the Pacific Ocean =

This table of major ports and harbours on the Pacific Ocean can be sorted by continent, body of water or political jurisdiction.

== List ==
Port	Region	Country (and subdivision)	Body of water	Coordinates	Features and notes
Acajutla	Central America	El Salvador, Sonsonate		13.59°N 89.834°W	
Corinto	Central America	Nicaragua, Chinandega		12.483°N 87.183°W	
La Libertad	Central America	El Salvador, La Libertad			
La Unión	Central America	El Salvador, La Unión	Gulf of Fonseca		
Panama City	Central America	Panama, Panamá Province	Gulf of Panama	8.967°N 79.55°W	Panama Canal
Balboa	Central America	Panama	Gulf of Panama		Panama Canal
Caldera,	Central America	Costa Rica, Puntarenas		9.967°N 84.833°W	
San Lorenzo	Central America	Honduras, Valle	Gulf of Fonseca		
San José	Central America	Guatemala, Escuintla			
Champerico	Central America	Guatemala, Retalhuleu			
Golfito	Central America	Costa Rica, Puntarenas		8.65°N 83.15°W	
Acapulco	North America	Mexico, Guerrero			
Anchorage	North America	United States, Alaska	Gulf of Alaska, Cook Inlet, Knik Arm	61.238°N 149.895°W	US rank: 89
Cabo San Lucas	North America	Mexico, Baja California Sur			
Long Beach	North America	United States, California	San Pedro Bay	33.74°N 118.21°W	US rank: 5
Los Angeles	North America	United States, California	San Pedro Bay	33.777°N 118.241°W	US rank: 9
Mazatlán	North America	Mexico, Sinaloa			
Oakland	North America	United States, California	San Francisco Bay	37.822°N 122.308°W	US rank: 35
Portland	North America	United States, Oregon	Columbia River	45.479°N 122.665°W	US rank: 28
San Diego	North America	United States, California	San Diego Bay	32.708°N 117.178°W	US rank: 124
San Francisco	North America	United States, California	San Francisco Bay	37.807°N 122.399°W	US rank: 138
Port of Seattle	North America	United States, Washington	Puget Sound, Central Basin, Elliott Bay	47.588°N 122.359°W	US rank: 26
Port of Tacoma	North America	United States, Washington	Puget Sound, Central Basin, Commencement Bay	47.29°N 122.452°W	US rank: 30
Tijuana	North America	Mexico, Baja California			
Valdez	North America	United States, Alaska	Gulf of Alaska, Prince William Sound, Valdez Arm, Port Valdez	61.125°N 146.346°W	Valdez oil terminal, US rank: 23
Nikiski	North America	United States, Alaska	Gulf of Alaska, Cook Inlet	60.748°N 151.314°W	US rank: 71
Juneau	North America	United States, Alaska	Gulf of Alaska, Gastineau Channel	58.351°N 134.512°W	
Ketchikan	North America	United States, Alaska	Gulf of Alaska, Tongass Narrows	55.348°N 131.664°W	
Port of Prince Rupert	North America	Canada, British Columbia		54.312°N 130.327°W	CA rank: 12
Kitimat	North America	Canada, British Columbia	Douglas Channel		
Coal Harbour	North America	Canada, British Columbia	Burrard Inlet	49.292°N 123.127°W	(Merged with Port Metro Vancouver)
Vancouver	North America	Canada, British Columbia	Strait of Georgia (including facilities on Burrard Inlet and Fraser River)	49.277°N 123.121°W	CA rank: 1
Port Alberni	North America	Canada, British Columbia	Alberni Inlet	49.234°N 124.805°W	CA rank: 19
Fraser River Port	North America	Canada, British Columbia, New Westminster		49.207°N 122.911°W	(Merged with Port Metro Vancouver) CA rank: 7
Nanaimo	North America	Canada, British Columbia	Strait of Georgia	49.183°N 123.983°W	CA rank: 14
North Fraser	North America	Canada, British Columbia		49.167°N 123.133°W	(Merged with Port Metro Vancouver) CA rank: 10
Roberts Bank Superport	North America	Canada, British Columbia	Strait of Georgia	49.019°N 123.16°W	(Merged with Port Metro Vancouver)
Victoria	North America	Canada, British Columbia	Strait of Juan de Fuca		
Port Hueneme	North America	United States, California	Santa Barbara Channel	33.777°N 118.241°W	US rank: 9
Port of Longview	North America	United States, Washington	Columbia River	46.06°N 122.57°W	US rank: 62
Port of Redwood City	North America	United States, California	San Francisco Bay	37.505°N 122.214°W	US rank: 134
Richmond	North America	United States, California	San Francisco Bay	37.924°N 122.374°W	US rank: 29
Vallejo	North America	United States, California	San Francisco Bay, San Pablo Bay	38.113°N 122.236°W	
Stockton	North America	United States, California	San Francisco Bay, San Joaquin River		
Pittsburg	North America	United States, California	San Francisco Bay		
Sacramento	North America	United States, California	San Francisco Bay, Sacramento River		
Nome	North America	United States, Alaska	Bering Sea		
Port of Pichilingue/La Paz	North America	Mexico, Baja California Sur	Gulf of California		UNESCO Whale Sanctuary and Bio-Reserve
Port of Bellingham	North America	United States, Washington	Strait of Georgia, Bellingham Bay	48.75°N 122.475°W	
Port of Everett	North America	United States, Washington	Puget Sound, Whidbey Basin, Possession Sound	47.985°N 122.229°W	US rank: 122
Fraser River Docks	North America	Canada, British Columbia, Surrey	Fraser River		
Port Coquitlam	North America	Canada, British Columbia	Fraser River and Pitt River		
Anacortes	North America	United States, Washington	Fidalgo Bay	48.496°N 122.6°W	US rank: 55
Port Angeles	North America	United States, Washington	Port Angeles	48.131°N 123.453°W	US rank: 148
Bremerton	North America	United States, Washington	Puget Sound, Central Basin, Sinclair Inlet	47.57°N 122.653°W	
Olympia	North America	United States, Washington	Puget Sound, South Basin, Budd Inlet	47.068°N 122.909°W	US rank: 126
Port of Grays Harbor, Aberdeen, Grays Harbor County	North America	United States, Washington	Grays Harbor	46.904°N 124.176°W	US rank: 112
Kalama	North America	United States, Washington	Columbia River	46.02°N 122.863°W	US rank: 44
Port of Vancouver USA	North America	United States, Washington	Columbia River	45.622°N 122.681°W	US rank: 56
Astoria	North America	United States, Oregon	Columbia River	46.189°N 123.821°W	
Coos Bay	North America	United States, Oregon	Coos Bay	43.364°N 124.21°W	US rank: 115
Humboldt Bay Harbor Recreation & Conservation District	North America	United States, California	Humboldt Bay	40.79°N 124.163°W	Includes the Port of Eureka (in Eureka, California) and Port of Humboldt Bay in the surrounding county.
Ensenada	North America	Mexico, Baja California	Bahía de Todos Santos	31.783°N 116.6°W	Ranks 5th in Mexico (35th in North America)
Guaymas	North America	Mexico, Sonora	Gulf of California		
Topolobampo	North America	Mexico, Sinaloa	Gulf of California		
Puerto Vallarta	North America	Mexico, Jalisco	Bahía de Banderas	20.667°N 105.833°W	
Manzanillo	North America	Mexico, Colima		18.92°N 103.88°W	Ranks 1st in Mexico (14th in North America)
Lázaro Cárdenas	North America	Mexico, Michoacán			Ranks 4th in Mexico (32nd in North America)
Salina Cruz	North America	Mexico, Oaxaca	Gulf of Tehuantepec		
Puerto Chiapas	North America	Mexico, Chiapas		14.717°N 92.417°W	In the neighborhood of Puerto Madero a.k.a. Puerto San Benito, in the municipality of Tapachula
Antofagasta	South America	Chile			
Arica	South America	Chile			
Buenaventura	South America	Colombia, Valle del Cauca			
Callao	South America	Peru			
Chimbote	South America	Peru			
Esmeraldas	South America	Ecuador			
Guayaquil	South America	Ecuador			
Ilo	South America	Peru			
Iquique	South America	Chile			
Manta	South America	Ecuador			
Matarani	South America	Peru			
Paita	South America	Peru			
Pisco	South America	Peru			
Puerto Bolívar	South America	Ecuador			
Puerto Chacabuco	South America	Chile			
Puerto Montt	South America	Chile			
Salaverry	South America	Peru			
San Antonio	South America	Chile			
Talcahuano	South America	Chile			
Tumaco	South America	Colombia, Nariño			
Valparaíso	South America	Chile			
Coquimbo	South America	Chile	South Pacific		
Puerto Williams	South America	Chile	Beagle Channel		
Punta Arenas	South America	Chile	Strait of Magellan		
Ushuaia	South America	Argentina	Beagle Channel		
Auckland	Oceania	New Zealand	Hauraki Gulf		
Bluff	Oceania	New Zealand	Foveaux Strait		
Brisbane	Oceania	Australia, Queensland	Coral Sea		
Dunedin	Oceania	New Zealand	Otago Harbour		
Honolulu	Oceania	United States, Hawaii			
Lyttelton	Oceania	New Zealand	Lyttelton Harbour		
Melbourne	Oceania	Australia, Victoria	Port Phillip		
Napier	Oceania	New Zealand	Hawke Bay		
Newcastle	Oceania	Australia, New South Wales	Tasman Sea		
Pearl Harbor	Oceania	United States, Hawaii			
Port Jackson (Sydney)	Oceania	Australia, New South Wales	Tasman Sea		
Tauranga	Oceania	New Zealand	Bay of Plenty		
Wellington	Oceania	New Zealand	Wellington Harbour		
Wollongong	Oceania	Australia, New South Wales	Tasman Sea		
Hobart	Oceania	Australia, Tasmania	Tasman Sea		
Botany Bay (Port Botany)	Oceania	Australia, New South Wales	Tasman Sea		
Port Kembla	Oceania	Australia, New South Wales	Tasman Sea		
Darwin	Oceania	Australia, Northern Territory	Arafura Sea		
Weipa	Oceania	Australia, Queensland	Gulf of Carpentaria		
Bundaberg	Oceania	Australia, Queensland	Coral Sea		
Gladstone	Oceania	Australia, Queensland	Coral Sea		
Hay Point	Oceania	Australia, Queensland	Coral Sea		
Townsville	Oceania	Australia, Queensland	Coral Sea		
Port Moresby	Oceania	Papua New Guinea	Coral Sea		
Port Chalmers	Oceania	New Zealand	Otago Harbour		
Timaru	Oceania	New Zealand	Canterbury Bight		
Nelson	Oceania	New Zealand	Tasman Sea		
New Plymouth	Oceania	New Zealand	Tasman Sea		
Bacolod	Southeast Asia	Philippines, Negros	Guimaras Strait		
Bangkok	Southeast Asia	Thailand	Gulf of Thailand		
Batangas City	Southeast Asia	Philippines, Batangas	Mindoro Strait		
Chân Mây	Southeast Asia	Vietnam	South China Sea		
Da Nang	Southeast Asia	Vietnam	South China Sea		
Davao	Southeast Asia	Philippines	Davao Gulf		
General Santos	Southeast Asia	Philippines	Celebes Sea		
Haiphong	Southeast Asia	Vietnam	South China Sea		
Iloilo	Southeast Asia	Philippines	Iloilo Strait		
Bitung	Southeast Asia	Indonesia, North Sulawesi	Molucca Sea		
Depapre	Southeast Asia	Indonesia, Papua			
Makassar	Southeast Asia	Indonesia, South Sulawesi	Makassar Strait		
Semayang	Southeast Asia	Indonesia, East Kalimantan	Makassar Strait		
Kuantan	Southeast Asia	Malaysia, Pahang	South China Sea		
Legazpi City	Southeast Asia	Philippines, Albay	Philippine Sea		
Laem Chabang	Southeast Asia	Thailand	Gulf of Thailand		
Manila	Southeast Asia	Philippines	Manila Bay		Manila North Harbor; Manila South Harbor
Quy Nhơn	Southeast Asia	Vietnam	South China Sea		
Sabah Ports Authority	Southeast Asia	Malaysia, Sabah	South China Sea		Kota Kinabalu Port; Sepanggar Bay Container Port; Sandakan Port; Tawau Port; Kudat Port; Kunak Port; Lahad Datu Port
Ho Chi Minh City - Saigon Port	Southeast Asia	Vietnam	South China Sea		
Singapore	Southeast Asia	Singapore	Singapore Strait	1.13°N 103.55°E	
Songkhla	Southeast Asia	Thailand	Gulf of Thailand		
Subic	Southeast Asia	Philippines	South China Sea		
Thị Nại	Southeast Asia	Vietnam	South China Sea		
Vân Phong	Southeast Asia	Vietnam	South China Sea		
Vũng Tàu	Southeast Asia	Vietnam	South China Sea		
Zamboanga	Southeast Asia	Philippines	Basilan Strait		
Aurora	Southeast Asia	Philippines	Philippine Sea		
Cagayan Freeport	Southeast Asia	Philippines	Luzon Sea		
Surigao	Southeast Asia	Philippines	Philippine Sea		
Tabaco	Southeast Asia	Philippines	Philippine Sea		
Piso Point Port	Southeast Asia	Philippines	Davao Gulf		
Puerto Princesa	Southeast Asia	Philippines	Sulu Sea		
Muara	Southeast Asia	Brunei	South China Sea		
Cam Ranh	Southeast Asia	Vietnam	South China Sea		
Kemaman Port	Southeast Asia	Malaysia, Terengganu	South China Sea		
Menumbok Jetty	Southeast Asia	Malaysia, Sabah, Kuala Penyu	South China Sea		
Labuan	Southeast Asia	Malaysia	South China Sea		
Kuching Port	Southeast Asia	Malaysia, Sarawak	South China Sea		
Miri Port	Southeast Asia	Malaysia, Sarawak	South China Sea		
Rajang Port	Southeast Asia	Malaysia, Sarawak, Sibu	Rajang River	2.29°N 111.82°E	
Tanjung Manis Port	Southeast Asia	Malaysia, Sarawak, Mukah	Rajang River	2.16°N 111.34°E	
Bintulu Port	Southeast Asia	Malaysia, Sarawak	South China Sea		
Sihanoukville Autonomous Port	Southeast Asia	Cambodia	Gulf of Thailand		
Cagayan de Oro	Southeast Asia	Philippines	Visayan Sea		
Cebu City	Southeast Asia	Philippines	Visayan Sea		
Busan	East Asia	South Korea	Sea of Japan		
Chongjin	East Asia	North Korea	Sea of Japan		
Jiujiang	East Asia	China	Yangtze River		
Dalian	East Asia	China, Liaoning	Korea Bay		
Guangzhou	East Asia	China, Guangdong	Pearl River		
Hakodate	East Asia	Japan, Hokkaido	Tsugaru Strait		
Kwai Tsing	East Asia	China, Hong Kong	South China Sea		
Tuen Mun	East Asia	China, Hong Kong	South China Sea		
Hualien	East Asia	Taiwan	East China Sea		
Incheon	East Asia	South Korea	Yellow Sea		
Kaohsiung	East Asia	Taiwan	South China Sea		
Keelung	East Asia	Taiwan	East China Sea		
Kobe	East Asia	Japan	Osaka Bay		
Nagoya	East Asia	Japan	Ise Bay		
Nampo	East Asia	North Korea	Korea Bay		
Ningbo	East Asia	China, Zhejiang	East China Sea		
Osaka	East Asia	Japan	Osaka Bay		
Pyeongtaek	East Asia	South Korea	Yellow Sea		
Qinhuangdao	East Asia	China	Bohai Sea		
Qingdao	East Asia	China, Shandong	Yellow Sea		
Shanghai	East Asia	China	East China Sea		
Shenzhen	East Asia	China, Guandong	South China Sea		
Suzhou	East Asia	China	East China Sea		
Taichung	East Asia	Taiwan	South China Sea		
Tianjin	East Asia	China	Yellow Sea		
Taipei	East Asia	Taiwan	South China Sea		
Tokyo	East Asia	Japan	Tokyo Bay		
Tsuruga	East Asia	Japan	Sea of Japan		
Wonsan	East Asia	North Korea	Sea of Japan		
Xiamen	East Asia	China	Taiwan Strait		
Yantai	East Asia	China	Yellow Sea		
Yingkou	East Asia	China	Bohai Sea		
Yokohama	East Asia	Japan	Tokyo Bay		
Yokosuka	East Asia	Japan	Tokyo Bay		
Zhuhai	East Asia	China	Pearl River Delta		
Sinŭiju	East Asia	North Korea	Yellow Sea, Korea Bay		
Rason	East Asia	North Korea	Sea of Japan		
Hungnam	East Asia	North Korea	Sea of Japan		
Gangneung	East Asia	South Korea	Sea of Japan		
Haenam	East Asia	South Korea	Yellow Sea		
Dongying	East Asia	China	Bohai Sea		
Jinzhou	East Asia	China	Bohai Sea		
Hangu	East Asia	China, Tianjin	Bohai Sea		
Lushun/Lushunkou	East Asia	China	Yellow Sea, Bohai Strait		
Chongqing	East Asia	China	East China Sea, Yangtze River		
Wuhan	East Asia	China	East China Sea, Yangtze River		
Rizhao	East Asia	China	Yellow Sea		
Weihai	East Asia	China	Yellow Sea		
Vladivostok	North Asia	Russia, Primorsky Krai	Sea of Japan		
Nakhodka	North Asia	Russia, Primorsky Krai	Sea of Japan		
Vostochny port	North Asia	Russia, Primorsky Krai	Sea of Japan		

== Gallery ==
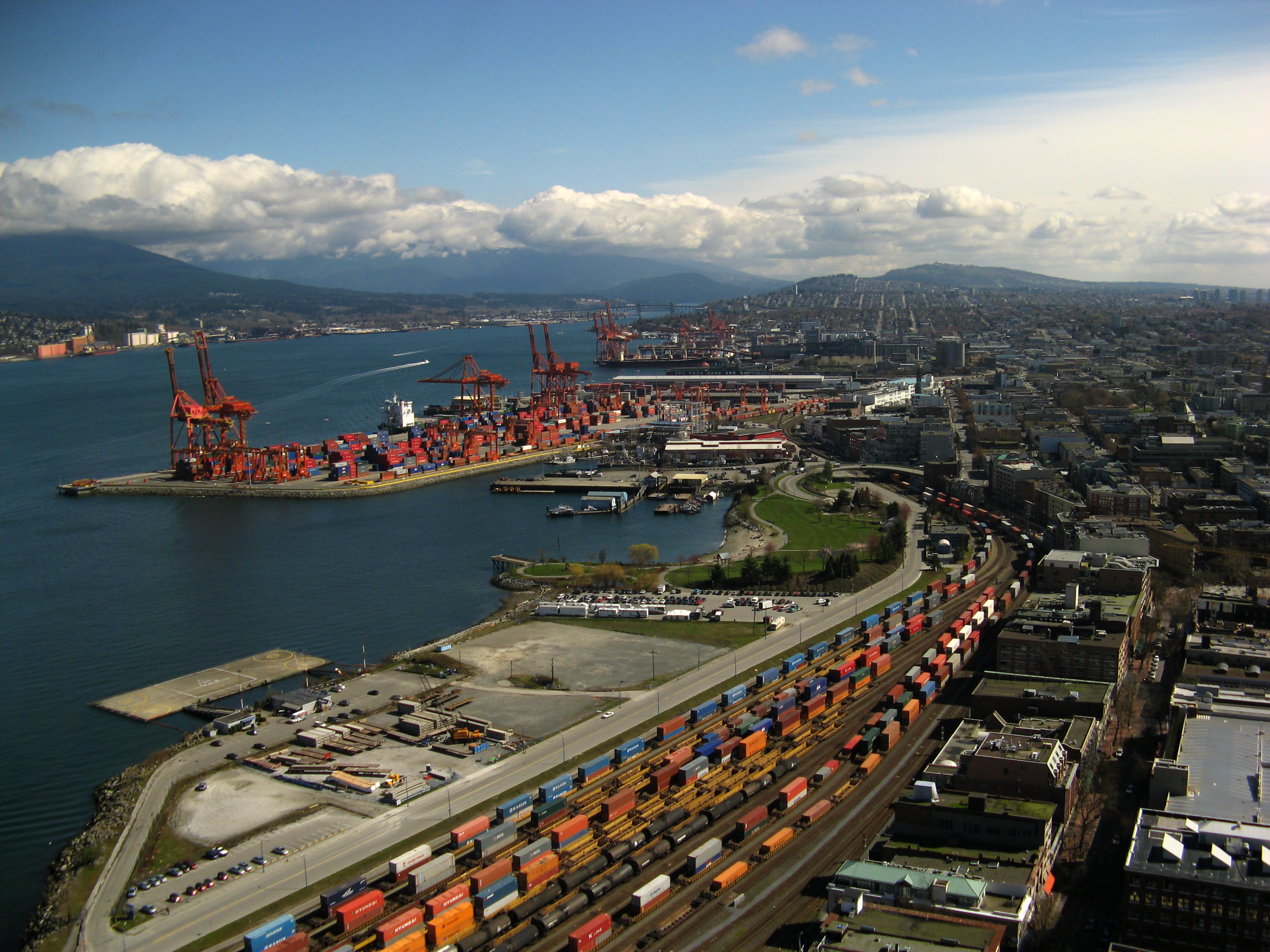
Port of Vancouver, Canada, the largest port in Canada and on the West Coast of North America by metric tons of total cargo

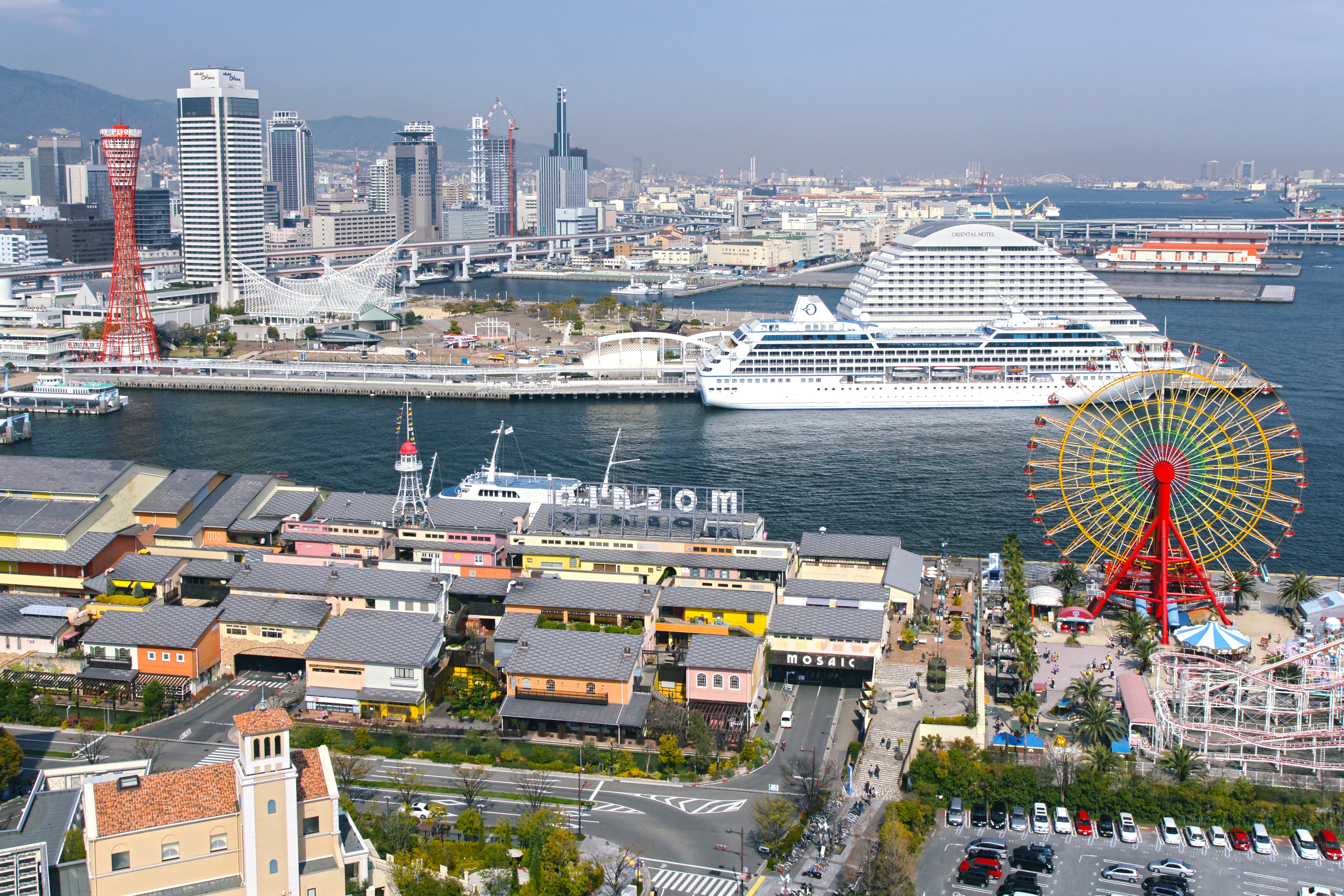
Port of Kobe, Japan

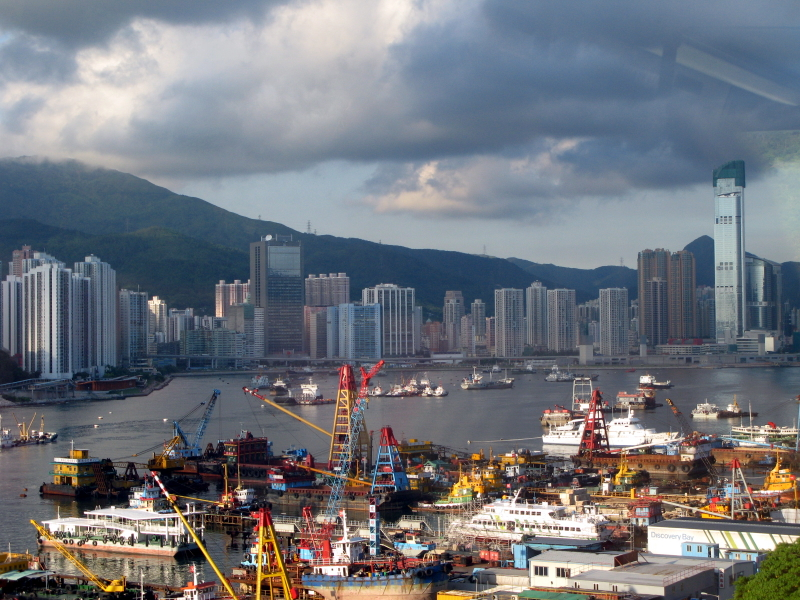
Port of Hong Kong, China

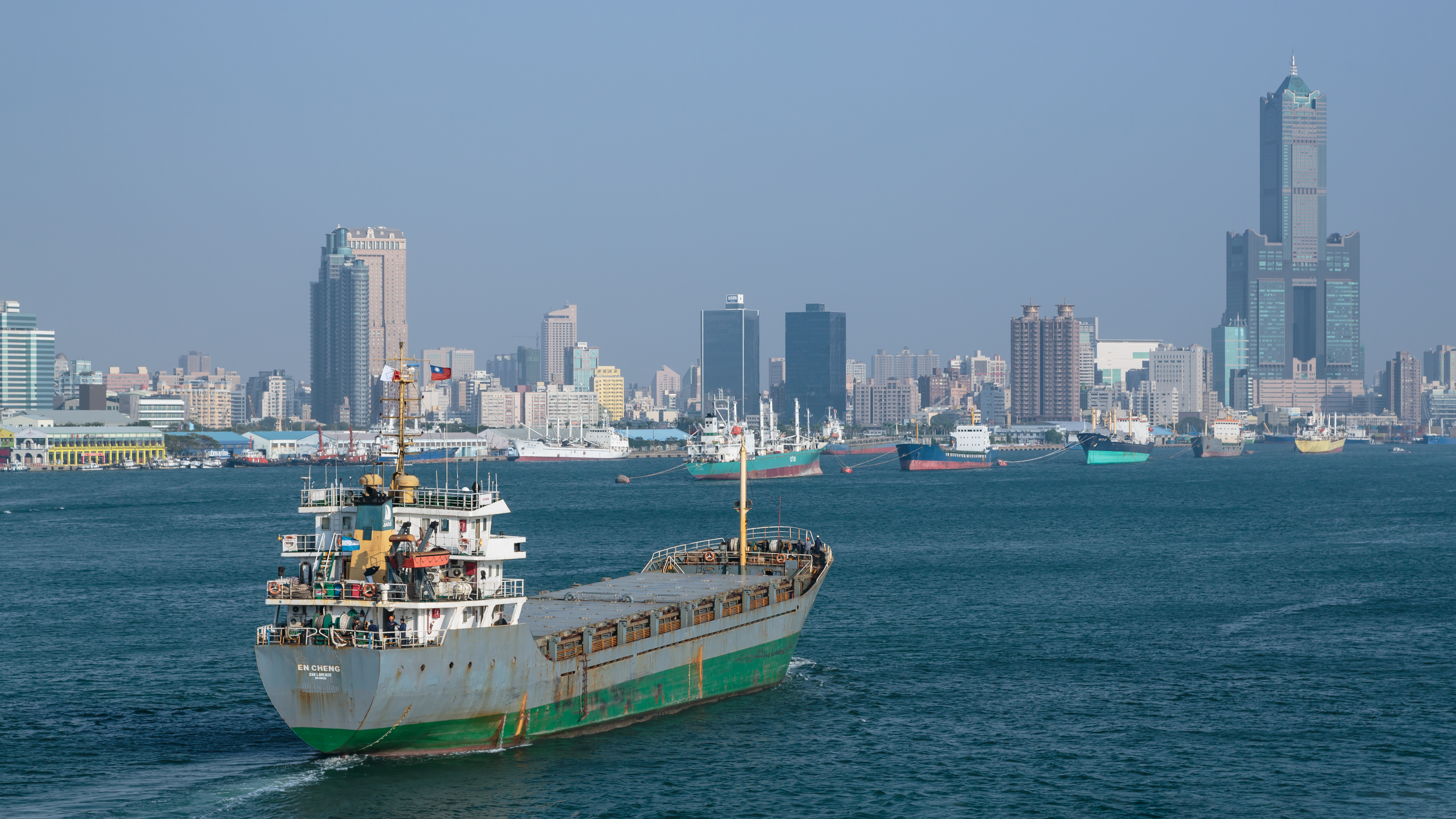
Port of Kaohsiung, Taiwan

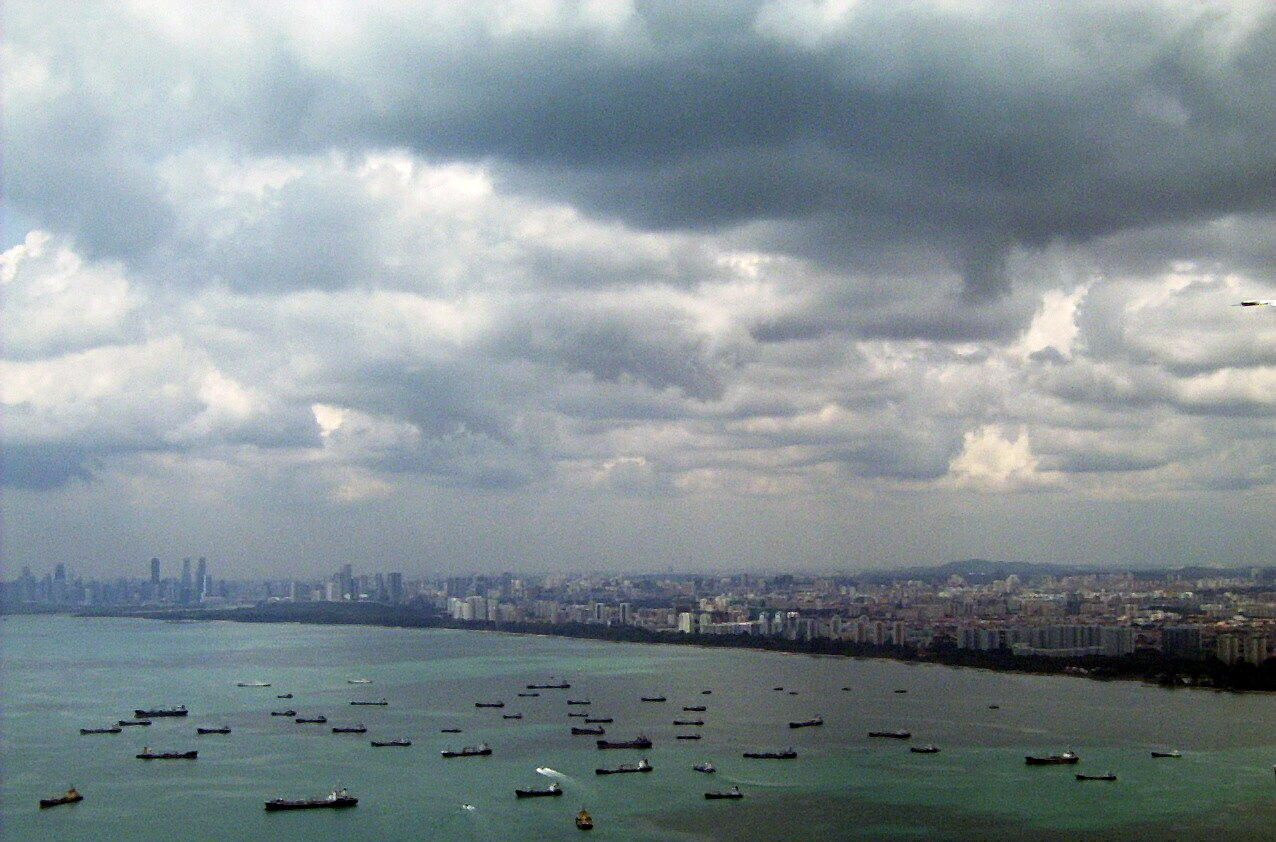
Port of Singapore, Singapore

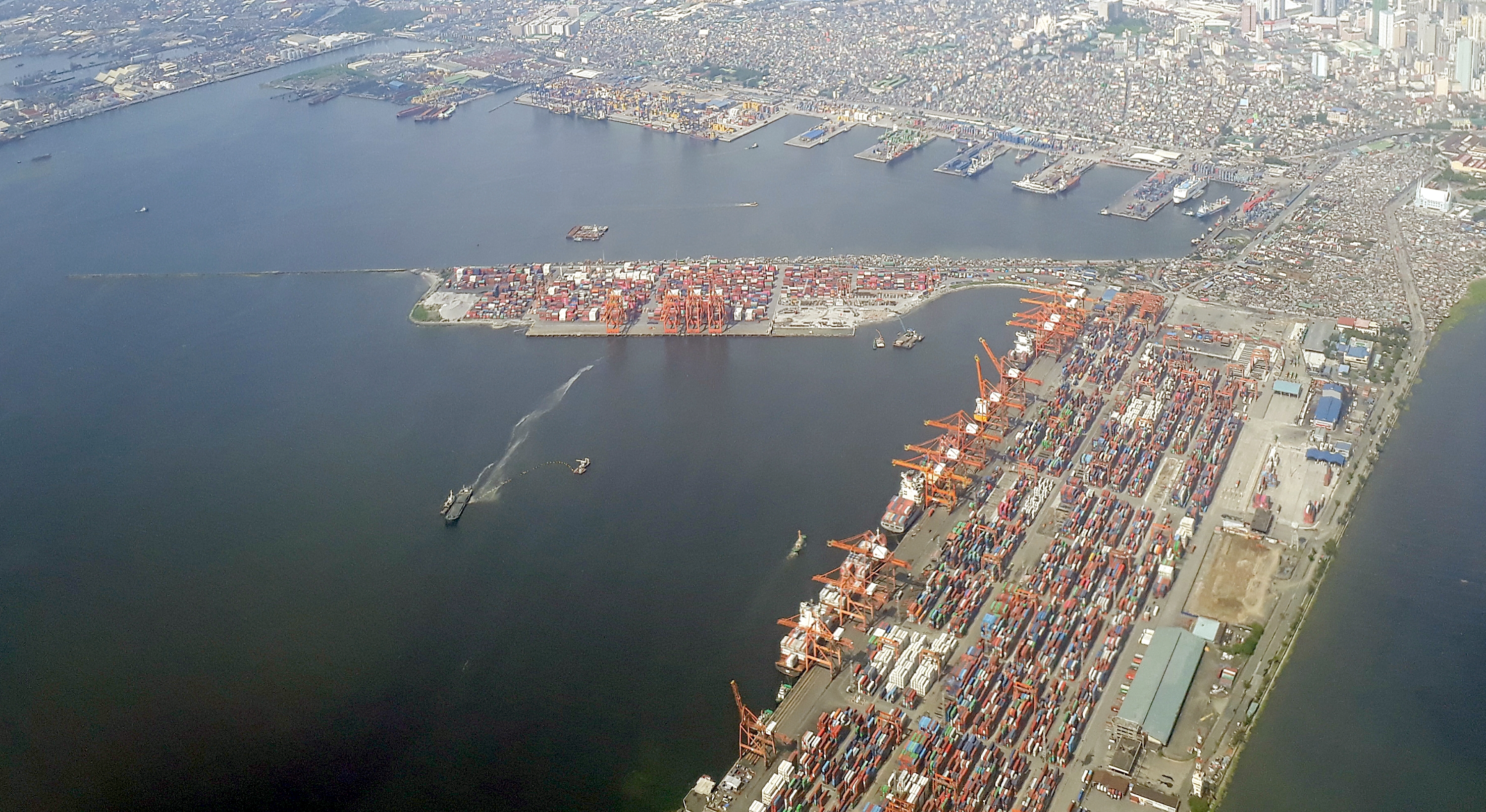
Port of Manila, Philippines

== See also ==
- List of ports in China

== Sources ==
- "North American Port Container Traffic - 2006" - Port Industry Statistics - American Association of Port Authorities (AAPA) - updated May 14, 2007.
