= Thunder Bay Port Authority =

Port in Ontario, Canada

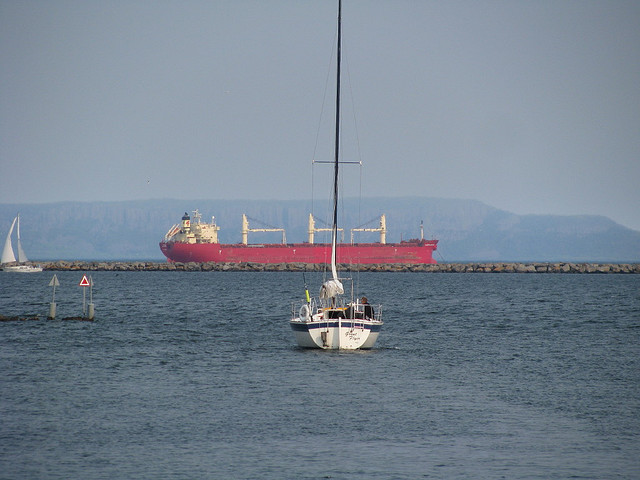
- A big bulk carrier, off the shore of Thunder Bay

Location
- Country: Canada
- Location: Thunder Bay, Ontario
- Coordinates: 48°24′23″N 89°13′01″W
- UN/LOCODE: CATHU

Details
- Land area: 32 hectares
- Draft depth: 9 metres (30 ft)
- CEO: Tim Heney

Statistics
- Annual cargo tonnage: 10.2 million metric revenue tons
- Vessel calls: 482
- Terminals: 5
- Grain elevators: 8
- Website www.portofthunderbay.ca

The Thunder Bay Port Authority is a port authority in Thunder Bay, Ontario, which was created by the Canada Marine Act of 1998. The 19 port authorities created by the act were 19 of the 20 most economically significant ports in Canada. The port is primarily a grain shipping port for Western Canada, with approximately 85% of the cargo tonnage consisting of grain exported to ports around the world. Coal and potash make up most of the remaining cargo of the port, though increasingly wind turbine supplies going to Western Canada are also shipped through the port. In 2019, 429 ships called at the port, with 316 being domestic vessels and 113 foreign vessels. The 2019 shipping season saw an increase of 500,000 tonnes to 9.3 million for the year, with most of the increase coming through the grain sector, though white potash numbers were also up.

The port authority is under the supervision of Canada's Federal Minister of Transport, and is responsible for 56 kilometres (35 mi) of shoreline, 26 km^{2} (10 sq mi) of shore and 119 km^{2} (46 sq mi) of water.

== History ==
The historical beginnings of the port lay with the North American fur trade and French voyageurs in 1678. Fort William was erected on the Kaministiquia River in 1805 in what is called the East End and the fort was soon the site of frequent canoe and ship visits, the first for the area. A second port was also established soon after at Prince Arthur's Landing, later called Port Arthur, and located in what is now north Thunder Bay. During the Red River Rebellion in Manitoba, troops from Central Canada were sent to quell the uprising via Port Arthur.

A small rivalry was born between these two ports over the next decades. It was this spirit of competition that helped two communities thrive, silver was discovered there and the railroad came in the 1870s and 1880s. The cities’ building boom ended in the early 20th Century, but World War I saw shipbuilding increase in the port areas as well as munititions manufacturing. The communities of Fort William and Port Arthur competed with each other until they amalgamated as Thunder Bay in 1969.

When the St. Lawrence Seaway opened in 1959 this meant that the port was now opened to ocean going vessels nicknamed "salties", while Great Lakes freighters were known as "lakers". Salties were frequently freight and container laden vessels, so Keefer Terminal opened in the same year of 1959 to serve as a freight terminal. More modernization in the form of automated grain elevators saw an increase in loading rates, with shorter stays of vessels. This led to highs of 1,749 ships carrying 16,955,937 tonnes in 1964, while the annual shipping record for the port in tonnes was set when 1,359 vessels carried 22,397,940 tonnes in 1983.

The mid 1970s to the 1980s was the busiest period in the history of the port, with 1983 this peak in 1983. This was driven in part by grain shipments to Russia and ending when the Canadian government ended loan guarantees to them in 1983. Recent times have seen the Thunder Bay Port Authority decline as it struggled against economic pressures from outside. Grain shippers increasingly preferred ports on the British Columbia Coast and grain shipments continued to decline until recent years. Both industry and shipping ventures in the area decreased and the Thunder Bay Port Authority shifted to a role as a regional service center for Northwestern Ontario and Western Canada, though grain shipments continue to be the backbone of the port.

== Cargo statistics ==
Cargo Statistics in tonnes since 2016
Year	Grain	Coal	Potash	Dry Bulk	Liquid Bulk	General Cargo	Total Tonnes	Vessels
2016	7,464,799	778,419	331,909	161,738	62,009	31,540	8,830,414	403
2017	7,275,492	721,751	526,895	207,102	57,034	30,996	8,819,270	393
2018	7,401,647	702,965	425,859	137,910	35,485	31,335	8,734,931	408
2019	7,900,365	779,893	400,700	180,734	16,317	19,364	9,297,373	429
2020	9,210,240	434,021	316,499	210,217	7,482	17,146	10,195,605	482
2021	7,311,726	493,336	611,013	178,830	11,103	44,069	8,650,077	407
2022	6,234,144	505,725	1,204,876	196,789	5,577	47,993	8,195,104	395
2023	7,262,437	497,970	1,605,479	209,633	0	56,206	9,631,725	453
