= G3 Canada =

Canadian grain handling company

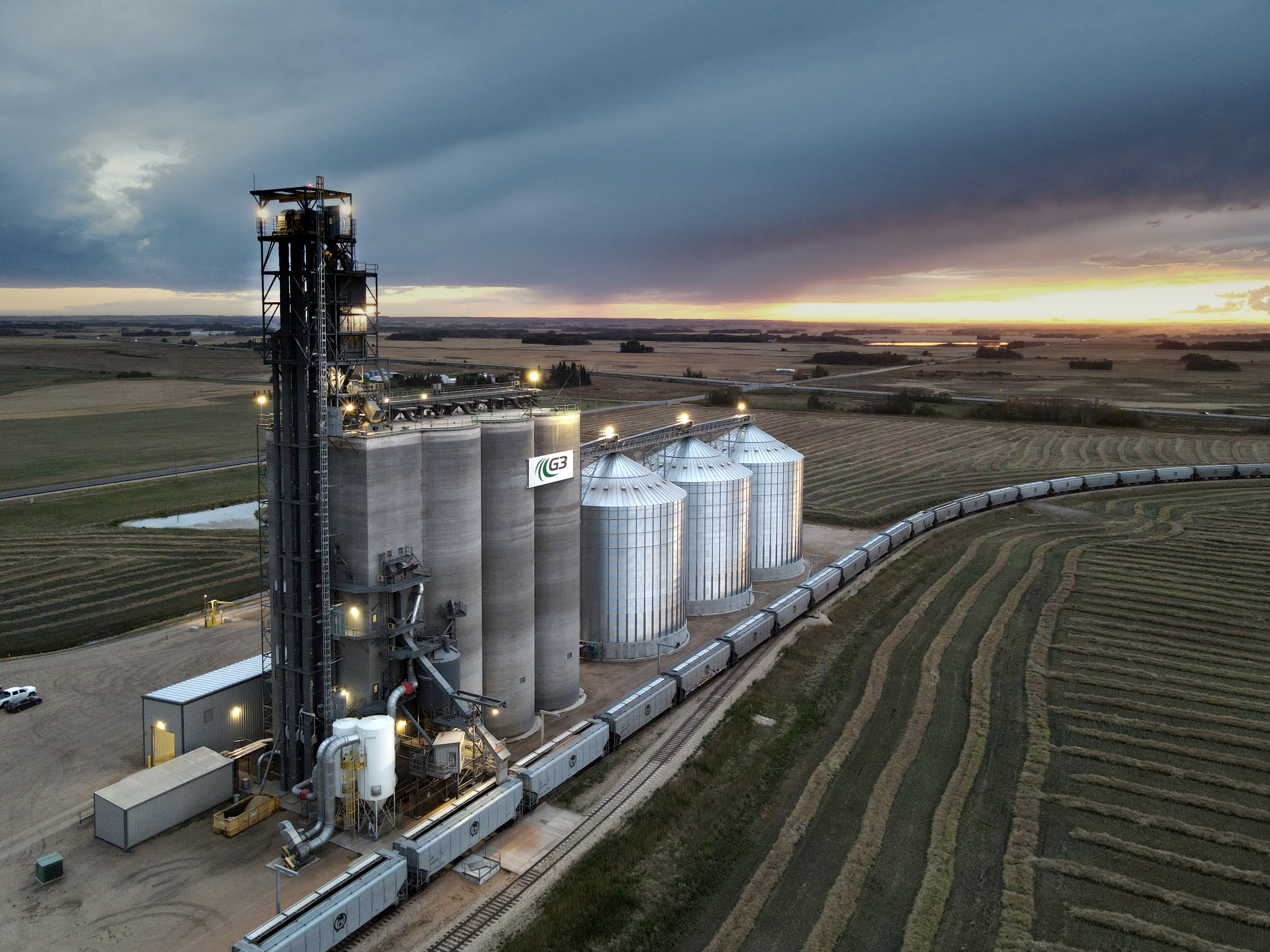
G3 grain elevator at Wetaskiwin, Alberta opened in 2020

G3 is a Canadian grain company headquartered in Winnipeg, Manitoba. It consists of two operating companies:

- G3 Canada Limited operates a network of grain elevators in western Canada and port terminals in eastern Canada. G3 purchases grains and oilseeds from farmers, who deliver the crops to G3 facilities by truck. The commodities are transferred to trains and/or ships and shipped to customers around the world. The company owns the Great Lakes bulk carrier vessel G3 Marquis.
- G3 Terminal Vancouver, a grain export terminal at the Port of Vancouver which opened in 2020.

== History ==
G3 Canada Limited was created in 2015, when G3 Global Grain Group (a joint venture of US agribusiness Bunge and Saudi agricultural investment firm SALIC) purchased a majority interest in the Canadian Wheat Board and combined it with the grain assets of Bunge Canada. The other shareholder in G3 Canada Limited is the Farmers Equity Trust, which owns the Class B shares in the company.

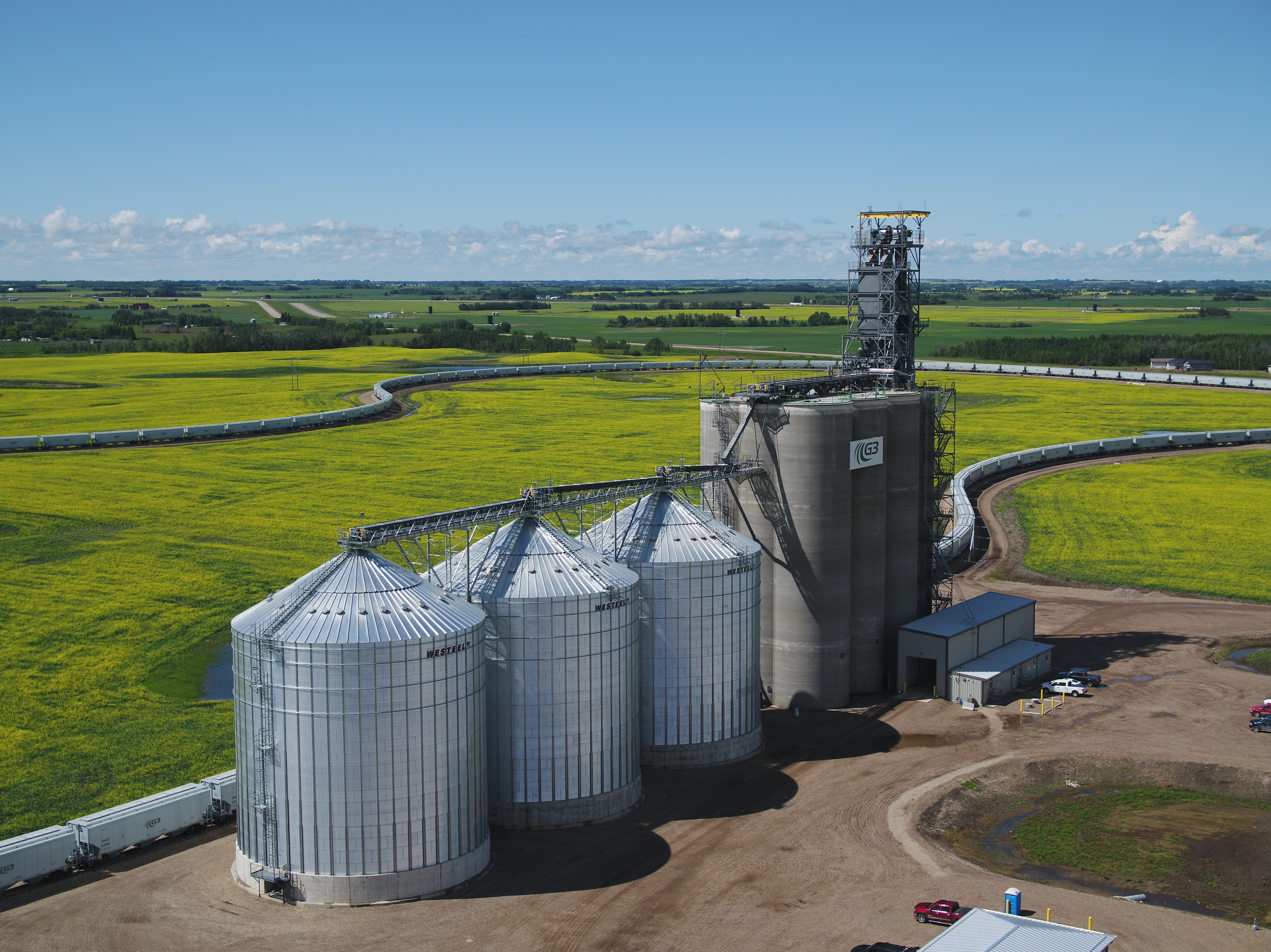
G3 grain elevator at Maidstone, Saskatchewan opened in 2019

G3 has built a network of grain handling facilities.

Grain elevators:

- Bloom, Manitoba, and Colonsay, Saskatchewan opened in 2015.
- Glenlea, Manitoba, and Pasqua, Saskatchewan opened in 2016.
- Melville and Saskatoon, Saskatchewan opened in 2018.
- Maidstone, Saskatchewan opened in 2019.
- Wetaskiwin, Morinville, Carmangay, Irricana, and Stettler County, Alberta opened in 2020.
- Vermilion, Alberta, and Swift Current, Saskatchewan opened in 2021.
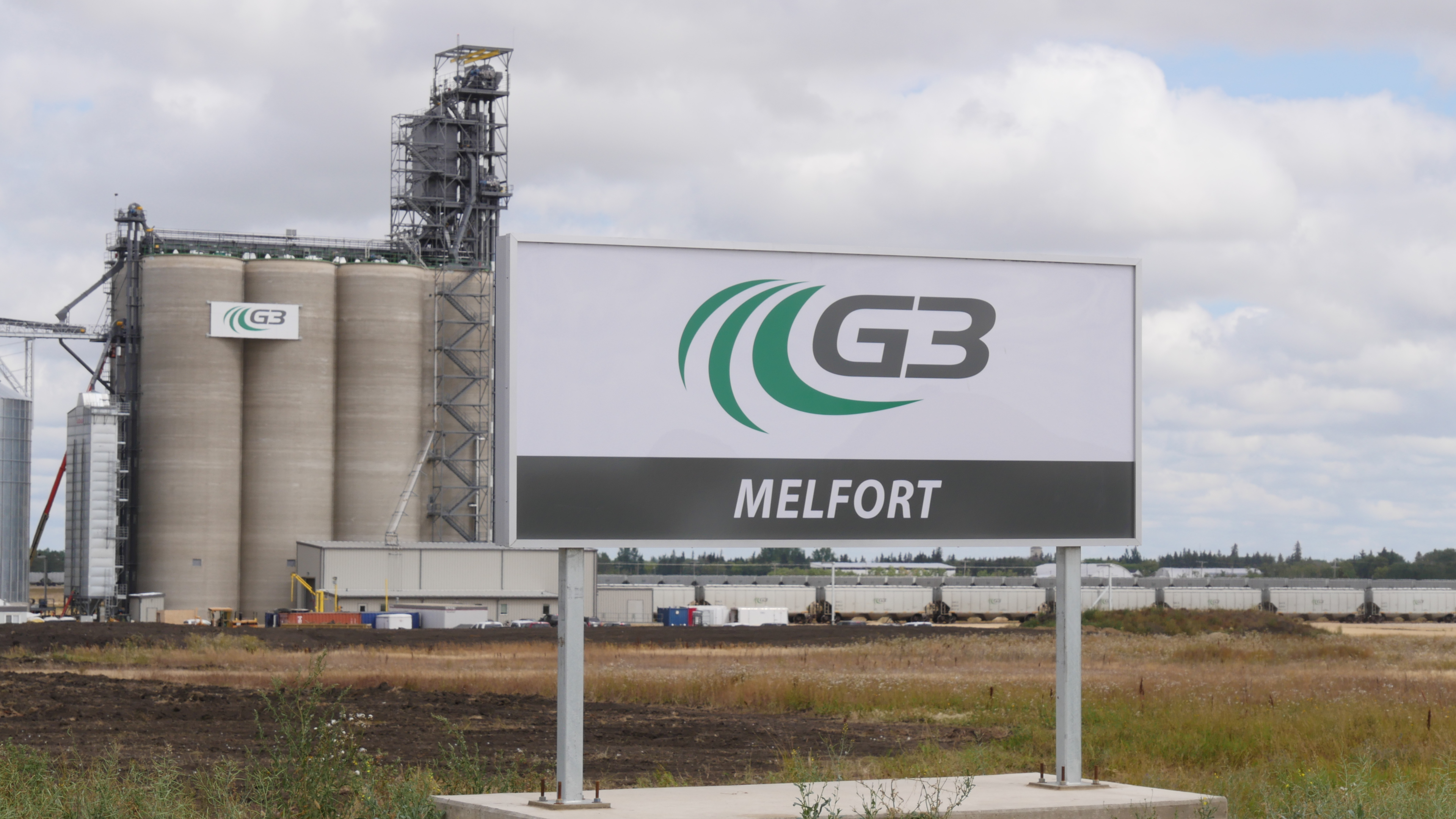
- G3 grain elevator at Melfort, Saskatchewan opened in 2023
  Melfort, Saskatchewan and Rycroft, Alberta opened in 2023
- G3 also operates grain elevators in Leader, Kindersley, and near Plenty, Saskatchewan

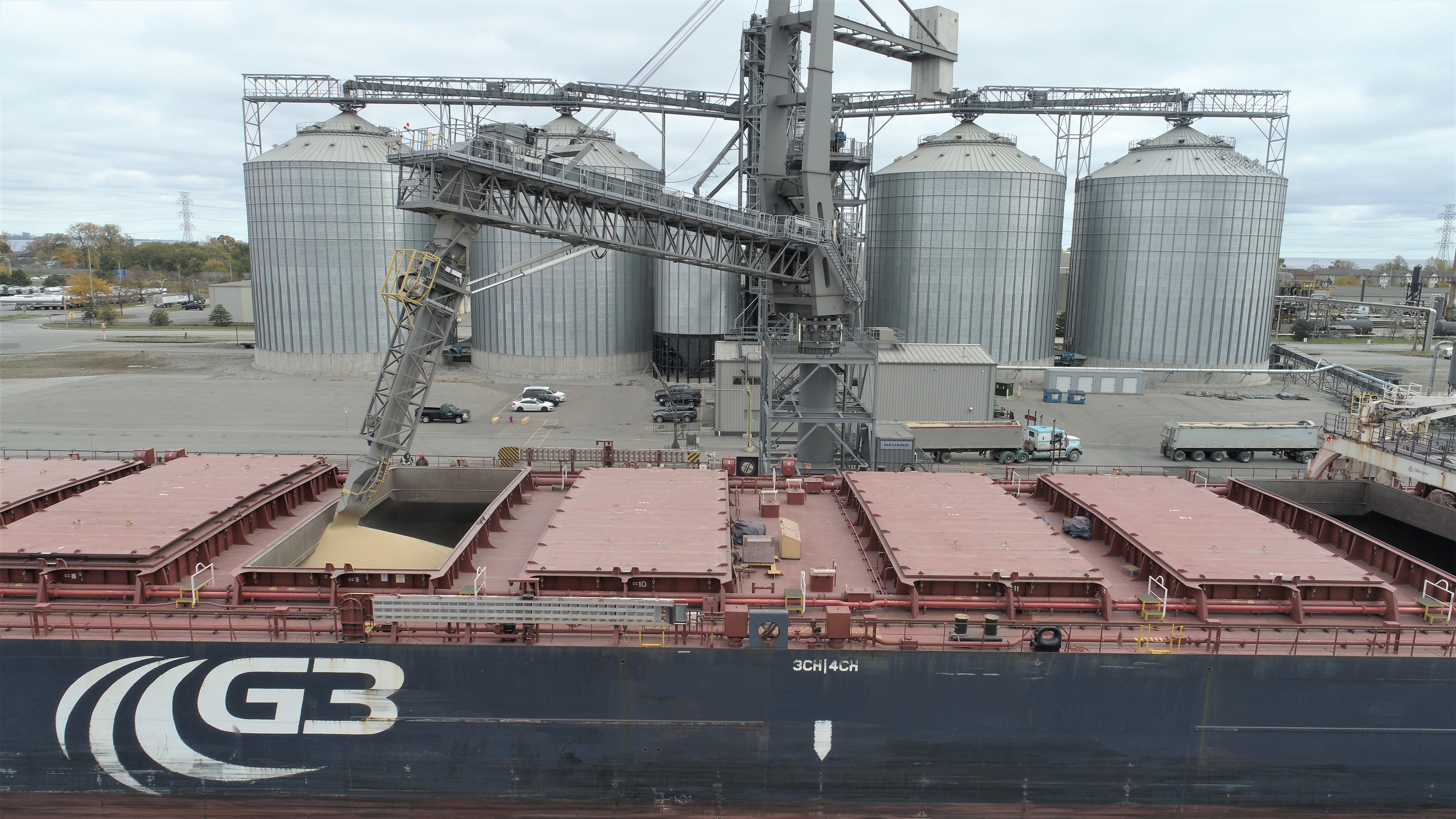
Laker vessel G3 Marquis at the G3 Hamilton, Ontario port terminal. G3 Hamilton opened in 2017.

Port terminals:

- G3 built a new grain export terminal at the Port of Hamilton, Ontario, which opened in 2017.
- The company operates port terminals at the Port of Thunder Bay, Ontario, Trois Rivières and Québec City, Québec.
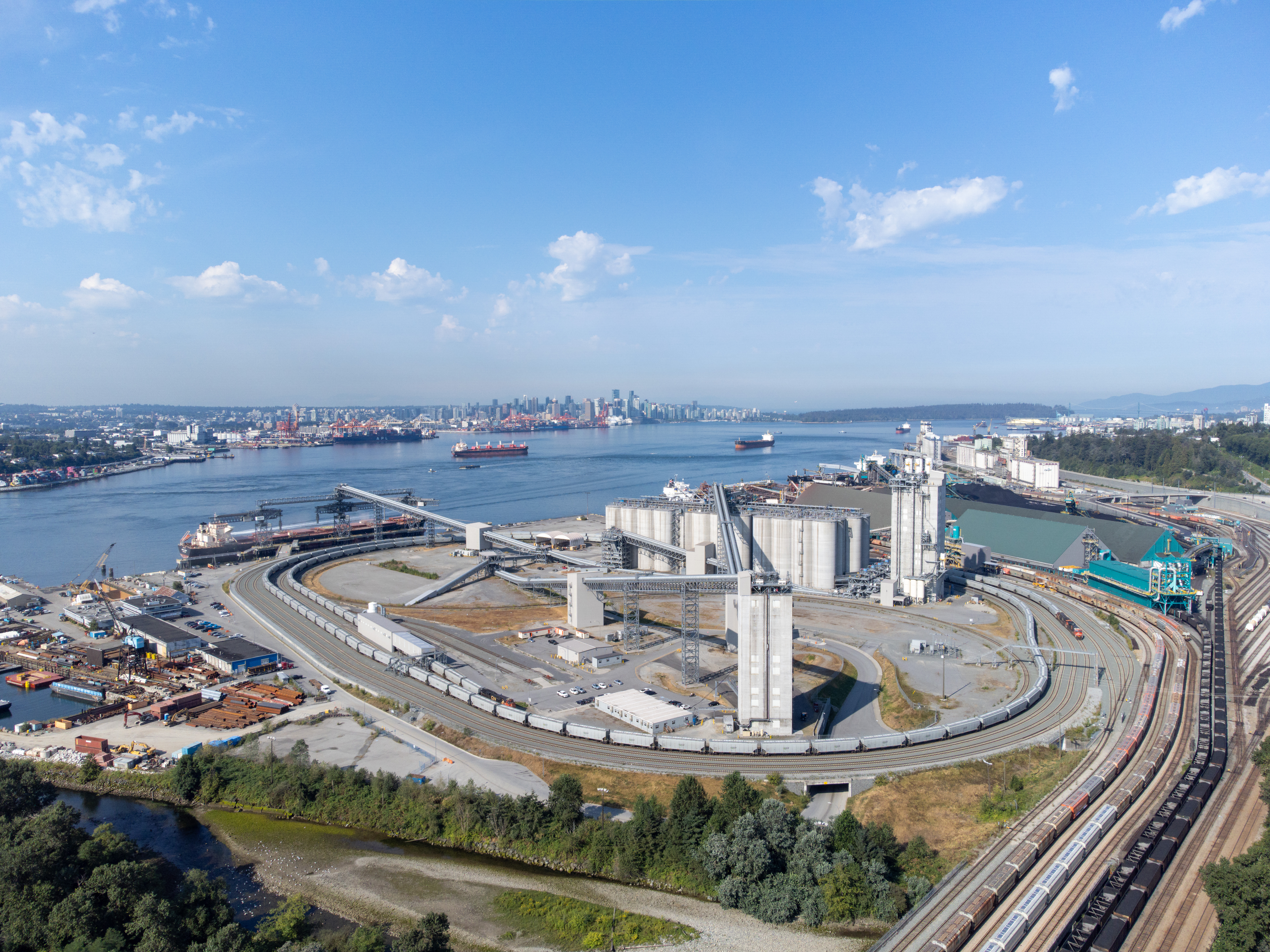
- G3 Terminal Vancouver grain export terminal opened in 2020
  In 2020, the company opened G3 Terminal Vancouver, a new grain export terminal at the Port of Vancouver in North Vancouver, British Columbia. G3 Terminal Vancouver is a joint venture of G3 Global Holdings and Western Stevedoring Company Limited.

G3's five port terminals are certified by Green Marine, an environmental certification program for North America's marine industry.
