= Port of Prince Rupert =

Port in British Columbia, Canada

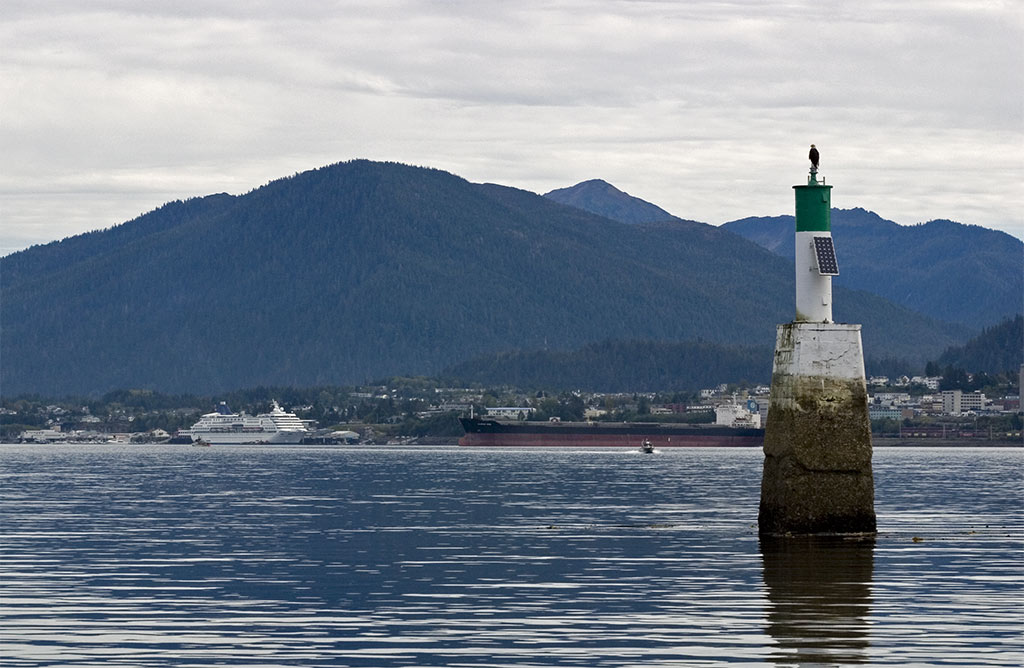
- Port of Prince Rupert in 2005
- Interactive map of Port of Prince Rupert

Location
- Country: Canada
- Location: Prince Rupert, British Columbia
- Coordinates: 54°17′18″N 130°21′22″W
- UN/LOCODE: CA PRR

Details
- Opened: 1914
- Land area: 667,731 hectares (1,650,000 acres)
- No. of berths: 5
- Draft depth: −16 m (−52 ft)
- Rail lines: CN Rail
- President & CEO: Shaun Stevenson
- Board Chair: Frans Tjallingi

Statistics
- Annual cargo tonnage: 29.84 million metric revenue tons (CY 2019)
- Annual container volume: 1.21 million twenty-foot equivalent units (TEU) (CY 2019)
- Passenger traffic: 12,435 passengers (CY 2019)
- Website www.rupertport.com

The Port of Prince Rupert is a seaport managed by the Prince Rupert Port Authority that occupies 667,731 hectares (1,650,000 acres) of land and water along 20 kilometres (12 miles) of waterfront. The port is located in Prince Rupert Harbour in the North Coast Regional District of British Columbia.

The Port of Prince Rupert is the third busiest seaport in Canada by container volume and cargo tonnage after the Port of Vancouver and Port of Montreal. The port is also the deepest ice-free natural harbour in North America, and the 3rd deepest natural harbour in the world.

The port is near the northern limit of the Pacific Pilotage District, it is also a Canadian Port of Entry, and has a shorter great-circle distance to far eastern ports than other Pacific Northwestern ports.

== History ==
=== Early 20th century ===
The Port of Prince Rupert was built upon the completion of the Grand Trunk Pacific Railway in 1914 and its development had been promoted by Grand Trunk Railway president Charles Melville Hays as an alternative to the Port of Vancouver, which was serviced by the Canadian Pacific and Canadian Northern railways. In 1919, the Grand Trunk Pacific fell into bankruptcy and was nationalized by the federal government and merged into the Canadian National Railways (CNR).

The port was expanded during World War II to support Canadian and United States military action in the Pacific Theatre, notably in the Alaska Territory.

=== Late 20th century ===
Prince Rupert was declared a public harbour in 1912, and later became a national harbour on 9 March 1972, followed by several years of construction of various facilities such as the Fairview and Ridley Terminals. Status evolved again in 1983, becoming a Port Corporation under the Canada Ports Corporation Act. A 1989 expansion of the Fairview Terminal added a third berth and 6.5 ha of storage area.

In 1989, 1,705 total vessels, including 468 deep sea vessels, with 11,332,000 tonnes of cargo moved through the port. Between 1982 to 2021 the Aquatrain barge carried rail cargo between Prince Rupert and Whittier, Alaska. Service ended in April 2021.

=== Conversion to an intermodal terminal ===
In April 2005, it was announced that the Fairview Terminal would be converted into an intermodal container shipping terminal, given Prince Rupert's advantages of having a location along the Pacific Great Circle Route between Asia and the west coast of North America; which makes it the first inbound and last outbound port of call, as well as having the deepest natural harbour depths on the continent.

With both a shorter route to Prince Rupert, and with less municipal congestion than other West Coast ports, additional rail infrastructure investments toward Canada's heartland cut time from East Asian markets to North American destinations. Sea travel time to the West Coast, time in processing the containers in port, and the time in getting products to the Midwestern United States became more efficient. The overall time from ports like Busan, Hong Kong, Kaohsiung, Shanghai, and Singapore in Asia and to eventual Midwest destinations like, Chicago, Detroit, Milwaukee, Minneapolis, and St. Louis, see time and cost reductions.

On September 12, 2007, phase 1 the Fairview Terminal opened for business and received its first container ship (from COSCO) in October. Phase 1 has an annual container-handling capacity of only 500,000 TEUs. However Phase 2, planned to be completed late in 2010, will increase the Port of Prince Rupert's capacity to 2 million TEUs, and to 4 million TEUs by 2015, and there is extensive capacity for further expansion. This will provide much-needed relief to the congested west-coast ports of North America. The containerization of the Fairview Terminal is an important part of the Asia–Pacific Gateway and Corridor Initiative of the Government of Canada and the Pacific Gateway strategy of the Province of British Columbia.

The second phase expansion has been protested by some First Nations groups, saying that the PRPA failed to consult them. Another group in Delta was lobbying for the expansion of the Prince Rupert port in order that the port at Delta will not be expanded.

On January 23, 2013, federal Environment Minister Peter Kent approved the environmental assessment of the Phase 2 expansion of the terminal. However, there was no set time frame for the construction of Phase 2, as the decision is up to Maher Terminals to proceed. It was noted that the need for expansion did not yet exist as through operation efficiencies achieved by the design of the terminal and the workforce, the actual capacity of the terminal (750,000 TEUs) exceeded the then current demand.

In January 2015 there was a trade dispute when the State of Alaska had solicited for bids for a ferry terminal update. The project was seeking U.S. Federal funds which required that the project comply with the Buy America Act. The Canadian Government blocked the project and the state of Alaska canceled bids because a temporary solution could not be reached.

The Port of Prince Rupert has advanced its logistics infrastructure through the development of LinX, a transload and logistics facility set to launch in Q1 2027. Operated by IntermodeX, an SSA Marine Enterprise, the initial 30-acre phase will include a 100-door facility designed to streamline cargo movement between North America and the Asia-Pacific region, leveraging the port’s strategic proximity to Asia and CN’s rail network.

The project aligns with the port’s broader role as North America’s closest gateway to Asia, offering reduced transit times and streamlined intermodal services through its integration with CN’s transcontinental rail network.

On August 27, 2026, the CANXPORT container terminal on Ridley Island was officially opened. Formerly known as the Ridley Island Export Logistics Project, the facility was constructed with funding from a $150 million loan from the Canada Infrastructure Bank. It aims to facilitate export from Canada, also utilising the empty containers from Asian imports, due to be returned back to Asia.

== Governance ==
The Prince Rupert Port Authority was created on May 1, 1999 and succeeds the Prince Rupert Port Corporation (PRPC). Prince Rupert was among 8 national ports in Canada which implemented this administrative change on this date, as required by the Canada Marine Act which passed on June 11, 1998. PRPC was the successor to the National Harbours Board, which previously operated all federally owned ports in Canada.

PRPA reports to the Minister of Transport and has a Board of Directors typically consisting of local business and community figures. During debate on proposed legislative amendments to the Canada Marine Act (Bill C‑33), Members of Parliament discussed establishing Indigenous advisory committees to ensure ongoing involvement of Indigenous groups in port management.

== Facilities ==
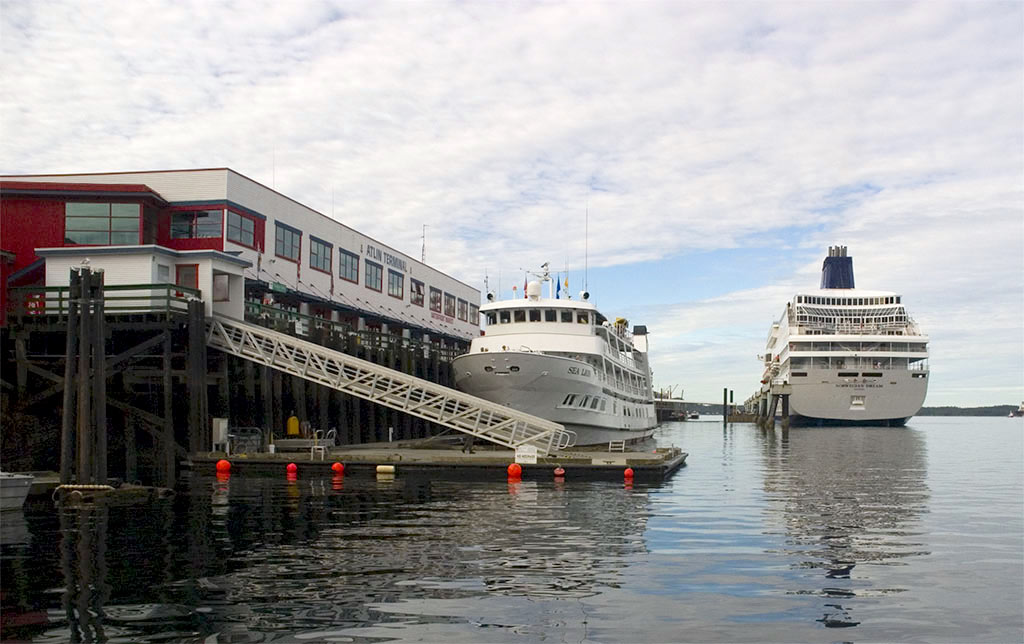
Atlin Terminal, a passenger terminal located in downtown Prince Rupert

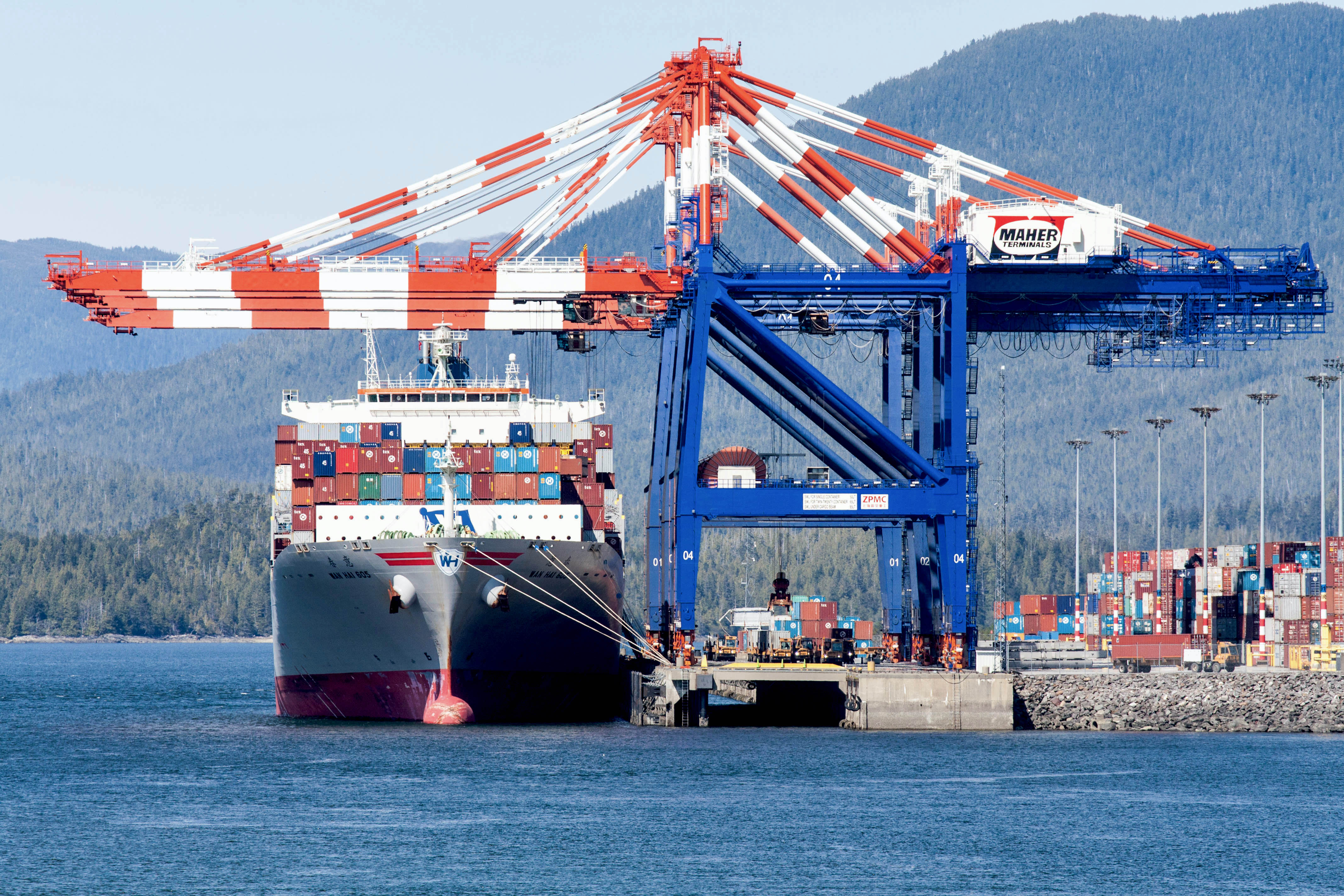
Fairview Terminal, a container terminal located just south of the city

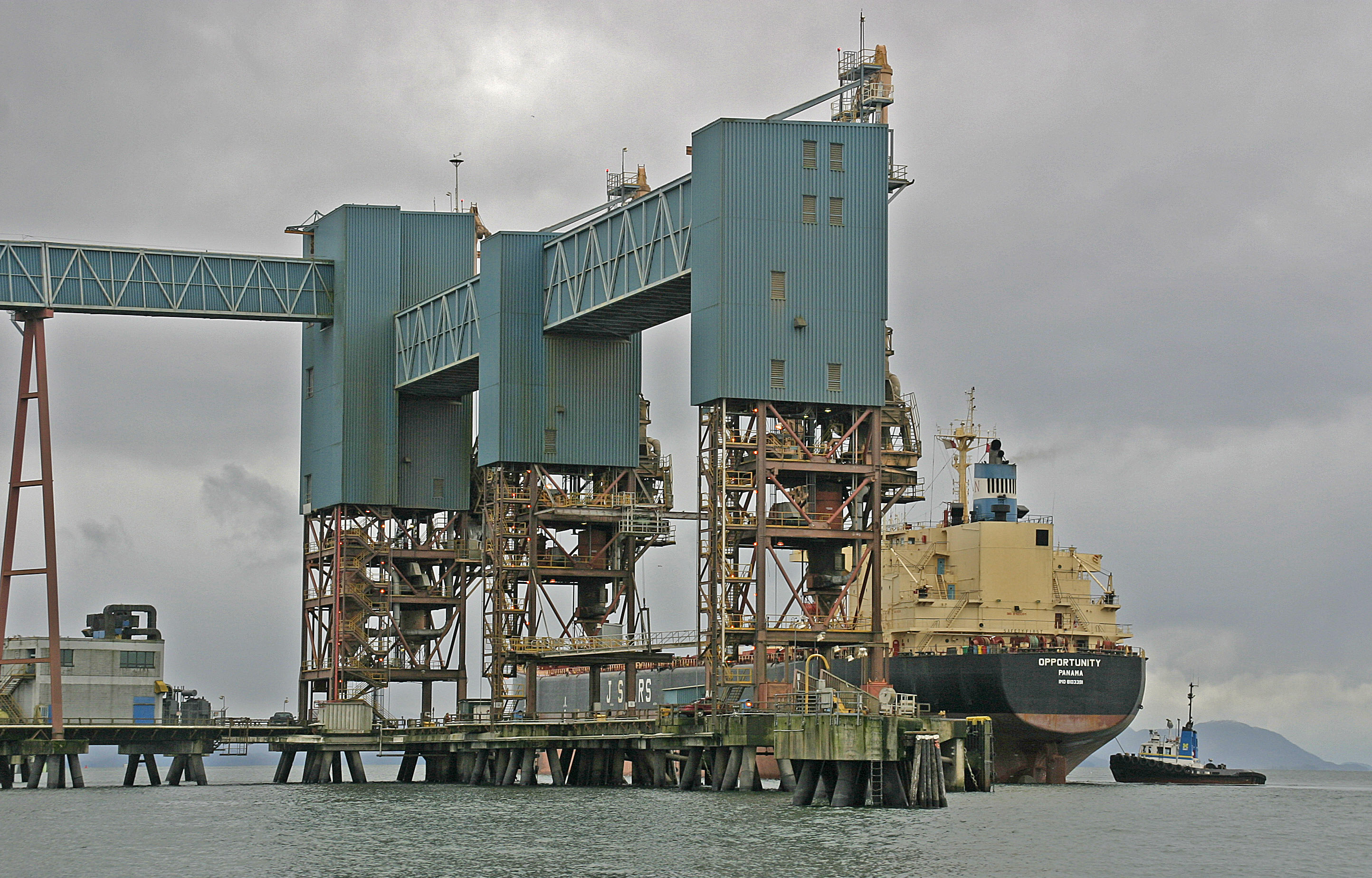
Ridley Island Prince Rupert Grain, a bulk cargo terminal located just west of Port Edward

PRPA port facilities include:

- Atlin Terminal
- Northlands Cruise Terminal
- Lightening Dock
- Ocean Dock
- Pinnacle Pellet Terminal
- Fairview Terminal
- Prince Rupert Grain
- Trigon Pacific Terminals (formerly Ridley Terminals)
- Westview Wood Pellet Terminal

All PRPA facilities are serviced by CN Rail.

Container terminals
Terminal	Operator	Depth (m)	Berths	Quay length (m)	Quay cranes	Area (m^{2})	Capacity (kTEUs)	References
Fairview (Phase 1)	PRPA	16	1	400	3	234,718	500	
Fairview (Phase 2)	PRPA	16	5	800	8–12	667,731	2000	

With the completion of Phase 2, the port has a capacity of 2,000 kTEUs. For comparison, the Port of Vancouver handles 2,500 kTEUs of cargo.

=== Pacific port volumes ===
Cargo handled expressed in the number of 20-foot-equivalent units (TEUs) and million metric tonnes (MMT). Statistics for American ports are excluded, because of inconsistencies among various web pages. The major differences may be due to the inclusion of empty containers shipped.

Port	TEU 2017	TEU 2018	MMT 2017	MMT 2018
	(000)	(000)		
Prince Rupert	927	1,036	24.2	26.7
Vancouver	3,252	3,396	142.0	147.0

=== Funding for container terminal ===
The Canadian $170 million terminal project, with a design capacity of 500,000 TEUs (20-foot equivalent units) has been funded by five partners:

- Maher Terminals, $60 million, including the three super-post panamax cranes
- Government of Canada: Western Economic Diversification Canada, $30 million
- Province of British Columbia, $30 million
- CN Rail, $25 million towards the terminal's rail-related infrastructure
- Prince Rupert Port Authority, $25 million

== See also ==
- Western Economic Diversification Canada
- List of deepest natural harbours
