= Ballantyne Pier =

Pier in Vancouver, British Columbia, Canada

Coordinates: 49.286698°N 123.087376°W

Ballantyne Pier (also called the Ballantyne Cruise Terminal) was a commercial and passenger dock of the Port of Vancouver, Canada, located at 851 Centennial Road. It sat at the west side of Rogers Sugar across the Canadian Pacific Railway tracks from Powell Street. Passenger terminal access was via Clark Drive or McGill Street Overpass only.

In 1995, the pier was renovated to create two modern cruise ship berths: the East Berth (#1) is 366 metres (1,201 ft) and the West Berth (#2) was used as an overflow berth. The dock was equipped with two automatic gangways and a terminal building with baggage handling and customs areas.

The pier stopped cruise operations at the end of 2014.

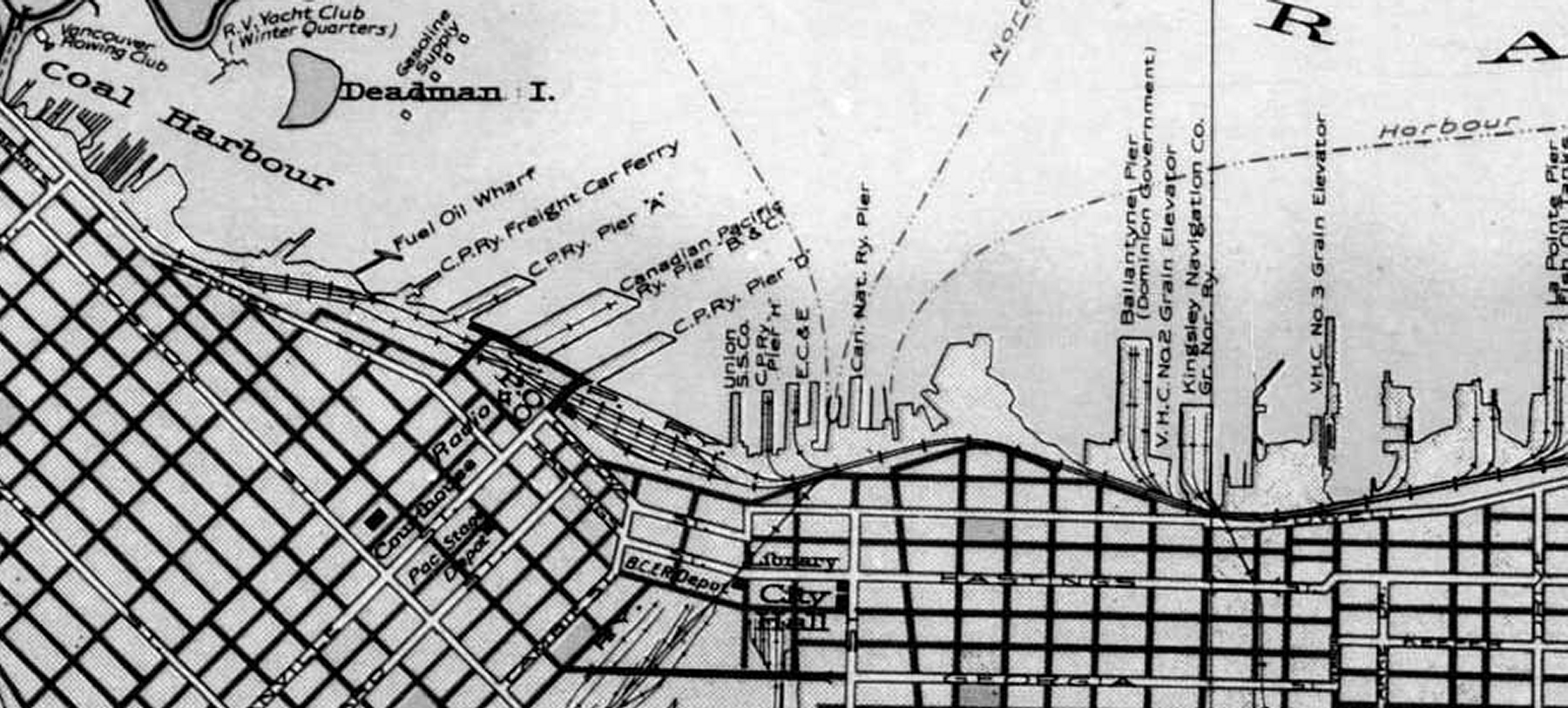

== See also ==
- Canada Place, the main cruise ship terminal in Vancouver.
