= Port of Vancouver =

Port in British Columbia, Canada

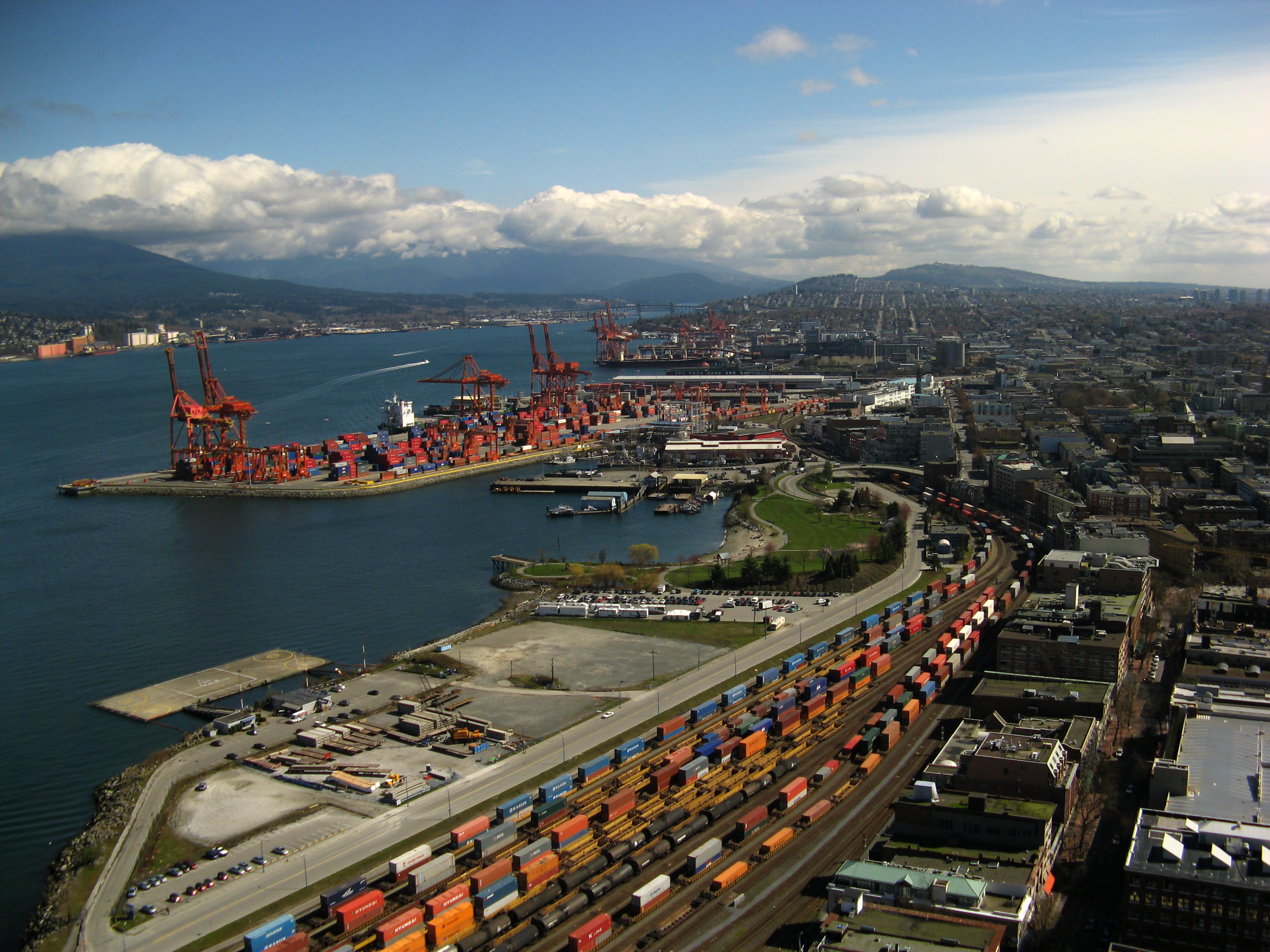
- Interactive map of Port of Vancouver

Location
- Country: Canada
- Location: Vancouver, British Columbia
- Coordinates: 49°16′37″N 123°07′15″W
- UN/LOCODE: CAVAN

Details
- Opened: 2008 (as amalgamation of former Port of Vancouver, North Fraser Port Authority and Fraser River Port Authority)
- Operated by: Vancouver Fraser Port Authority
- Owned by: Government of Canada
- Size of harbour: 16,000 ha (40,000 acres)
- Land area: 1,000 ha (2,500 acres)
- Size: 350 km (220 mi)
- No. of berths: 57
- Draft depth: 18.4 m (60 ft)
- Chair: Judy Rogers

Statistics
- Annual cargo tonnage: 141 million metric revenue tons
- Annual container volume: 3.5 million TEU
- Passenger traffic: 810,090 passengers 307 sailings
- Foreign vessel calls: 2,834
- Major marine terminals: 27
- Website www.portvancouver.com

The Port of Vancouver is the largest port in Canada and the fourth largest in North America by tonnes of cargo, facilitating trade between Canada and more than 170 world economies. The port is managed by the Vancouver Fraser Port Authority, which was created in 2008 as an amalgamation of the former Port of Vancouver, the North Fraser Port Authority, and the Fraser River Port Authority. It is the principal authority for shipping and port-related land and sea use in the Metro Vancouver region.

== History ==
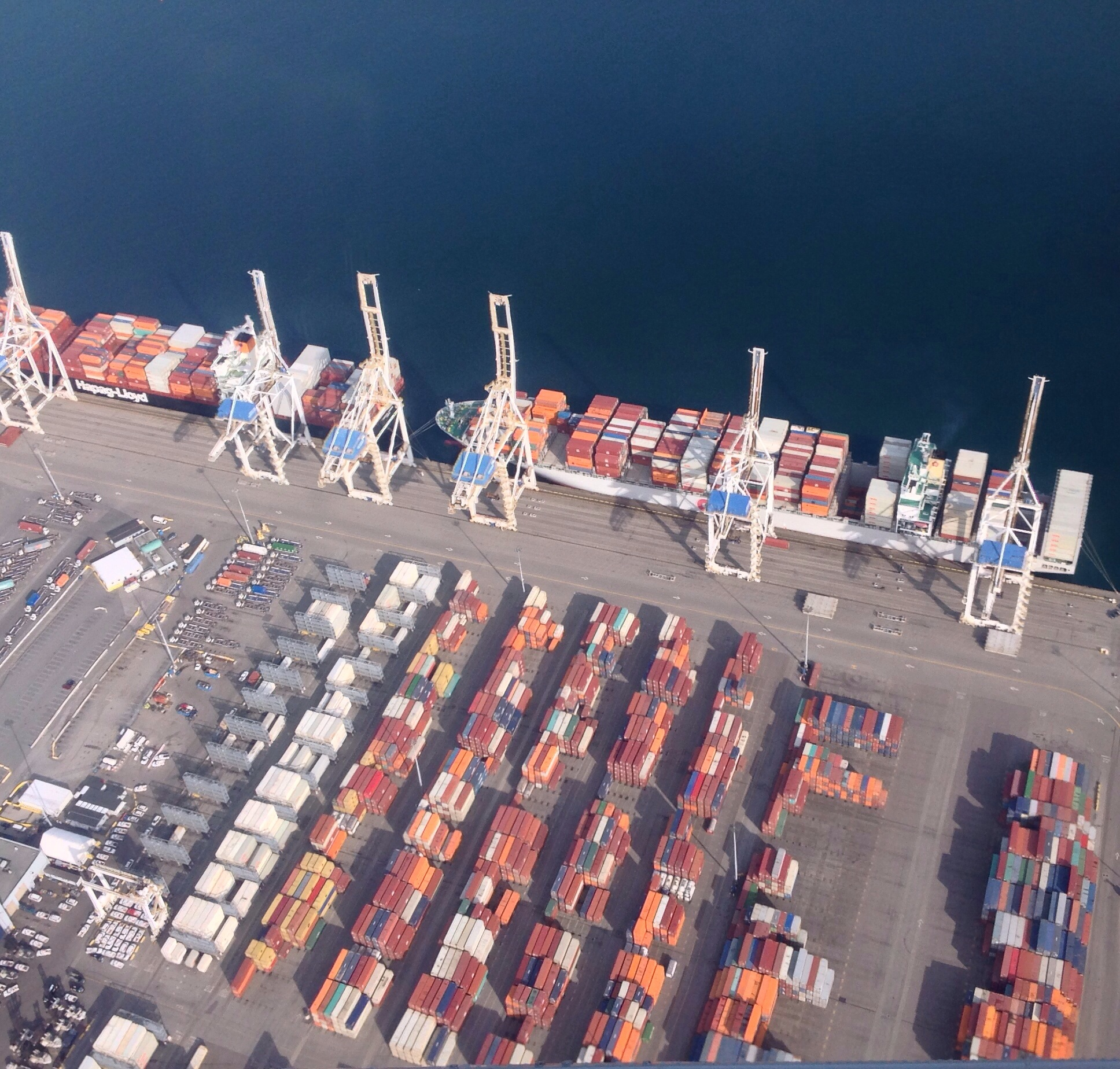
Deltaport/Roberts Bank Superport aerial view 2014

=== Predecessors ===
Prior to the formation of the new authority, there were three separate port authorities in the Metro Vancouver region: the Port of Vancouver, which was the largest port in Canada; the Fraser River Port Authority; and the North Fraser Port Authority.

The Vancouver Port Authority was responsible for the Port of Vancouver, which was the largest port in Canada and the Pacific Northwest. The port had 25 major terminals. The port first began operations with the opening of Ballantyne Pier in 1923. In 2005/2006, the port handled 79.4 million tonnes of cargo, 1.8 million containers, 910,172 cruise passengers, and 2,677 foreign vessels. The authority was responsible for 233 km of coastline from Vancouver to the Canada–United States border.

The Fraser River Port Authority was created in 1913 to manage ports along the Fraser River. It was the second largest port in Vancouver and extended along the main arm of the river eastward to the Fraser Valley at Kanaka Creek, and north along the Pitt River to Pitt Lake. The Port's jurisdiction encompassed 270 kilometres of shoreline that borders nine different municipalities in the Lower Mainland. In 2007, the port handled 36 million tonnes of cargo, 191,000 TEUs of containerized cargo, and 573 cargo vessels. The cargo at the port consisted of logs, cement, general cargo, steel, and automobiles. Its tenants included several large auto ports, making it the largest auto port in Canada. This entity was originally known as the New Westminster Harbour Commission, and then was known as the Fraser River Harbour Commission between 1965 and 1999.

The North Fraser Port Authority was incorporated in 1913 as the North Fraser Harbour Commissioners. It was the smallest of the three ports and was located on the north arm of the Fraser River from the University of British Columbia to New Westminster. The traffic of the port mainly consisted of logs and wood fibre. The port covered around 920 hectares of land and water lots and it handled nearly 18 million tonnes of cargo in 2004.

=== Merger ===
Although the ports were financially self-sufficient, the federal legislation governing the authorities generated some inefficiency because the legally separate port authorities were forced to compete with each other economically for business. This came to the attention of the local media in 2006 when it was found that the recently expanded Fraser Surrey Docks, operated by the Fraser River Port Authority in New Westminster, were sitting idle after their principal shipping partner, CP Ships, relocated to the Port of Vancouver, which was already nearing capacity. Some critics opposed the possible merger as they felt the new authority would not recognize the unique concerns of the Fraser River.

To increase the efficiency of the ports of Metro Vancouver, the federal Minister of Transport permitted the three authorities to study the benefits of amalgamation in June 2006. The resulting report highlighted several benefits of amalgamation, and on June 16, Transport Canada granted a "certificate of intent to amalgamate port authorities". On December 21, 2007, the government of Canada published a certificate of amalgamation that allowed the three port authorities to merge into one effective January 1, 2008. The resulting entity became known as Port Metro Vancouver.

=== Post-merger ===
Since 2013, the Vancouver Fraser Port Authority also merged with Canada Place Corporation, which formerly operated Canada Place as a subsidiary of Port of Vancouver.

On April 6, 2016, the port authority dropped "Port Metro Vancouver" from its branding and re-adopted "Port of Vancouver" to refer to Vancouver's port, while using "Vancouver Fraser Port Authority" when referencing activities or decisions of the port authority.

== Responsibility ==
The Port of Vancouver is managed by the Vancouver Fraser Port Authority, formerly called Port Metro Vancouver. It was created with the responsibility for the stewardship of the federal port lands in and around Vancouver, British Columbia. It was created as a financially self-sufficient company that is accountable to the federal minister of transport and operates pursuant to the Canada Marine Act. The port authority and port terminals and tenants are responsible for the efficient and reliable movement of goods and passengers, integrating environmental, social and economic sustainability initiatives into all areas of port operations.

In 1999, the local port authority took responsibility for dredging the deep-sea navigational channel in the South Arm of the Fraser River. Previously, dredging of the South Arm and other secondary channels was funded by the federal government and undertaken by the Canadian Coast Guard. As of 2014, the port authority spends CAD$15 million annually to dredge the shipping channel to a 11.5-metre depth (38 ft), although it recovers CAD$10 million of the cost by selling the dredged sand to cement manufacturers. Dredging occurs along the final 36 kilometres (22 mi) of the deep-sea channel between Sand Heads and New Westminster. The annual dredging season starts in the middle of June and finishes at the end of February.

Because of the dredging program, the Fraser River can handle vessels that are up to 294 metres (965 ft) length overall (LOA), 38 metres (125 ft) beam, and 11.5 metres (38 ft) draft with tidal assistance. The draft limit was increased to the current maximum in 2003. Previously, the maximum draft was 10.7 metres (35 ft), which was increased from 8.7 metres (29 ft) in 1976. The under keel clearance (UKC) is 1.4 metres (4 ft 7 in) for vessels shorter than 250 metres (820 ft) in length. For vessels exceeding that length, the UKC is 1.9 metres (6 ft 3 in). The maximum air draft is 53 metres (174 ft).

In 2014, the Port of Vancouver was the fourth largest port by tonnage in the Americas, 29th in the world in terms of total cargo and 44th in the world by container traffic. The port enables the trade of approximately $240 billion in goods. Port activities sustain 115,300 jobs, $7 billion in wages, and $11.9 billion in GDP across Canada.

== Major initiatives ==
The Container Capacity Improvement Program (CCIP) is the port's long-term strategy to meet anticipated growth in container traffic, which is expected to triple by the year 2030. The program consists of projects that both improve the efficiency of existing infrastructure and explore opportunities to build new infrastructure as demand rises. CCIP projects include the Deltaport Terminal Road and Rail Improvement Project (DTRRIP) and the proposed Roberts Bank Terminal 2 project.

DTTRIP will result in infrastructure upgrades that would increase Deltaport's container capacity by 600,000 TEUs (twenty-foot equivalent units), within the terminal's existing footprint. The Roberts Bank Terminal 2 project is a proposed marine container terminal that could provide an additional capacity of 2.4 million TEUs per year to meet forecasted demand until 2030.

=== North Shore Trade Area projects ===
- Western Level Lower Level Route Extension
- Pemberton Avenue Grade Separation
- Low Level Road Realignment
- Neptune/Cargill Grade Separation
- Brooksbank Avenue Underpass
- Lynn Creek Rail Bridge Addition

=== South Shore Trade Area projects ===
- Powell Street Grade Separation
- Stewart Street/Victoria Overpass

=== Environmental initiatives ===
- Enhancing Cetacean Habitat and Observation (ECHO) Program (2014-2021)

== Terminals and facilities ==
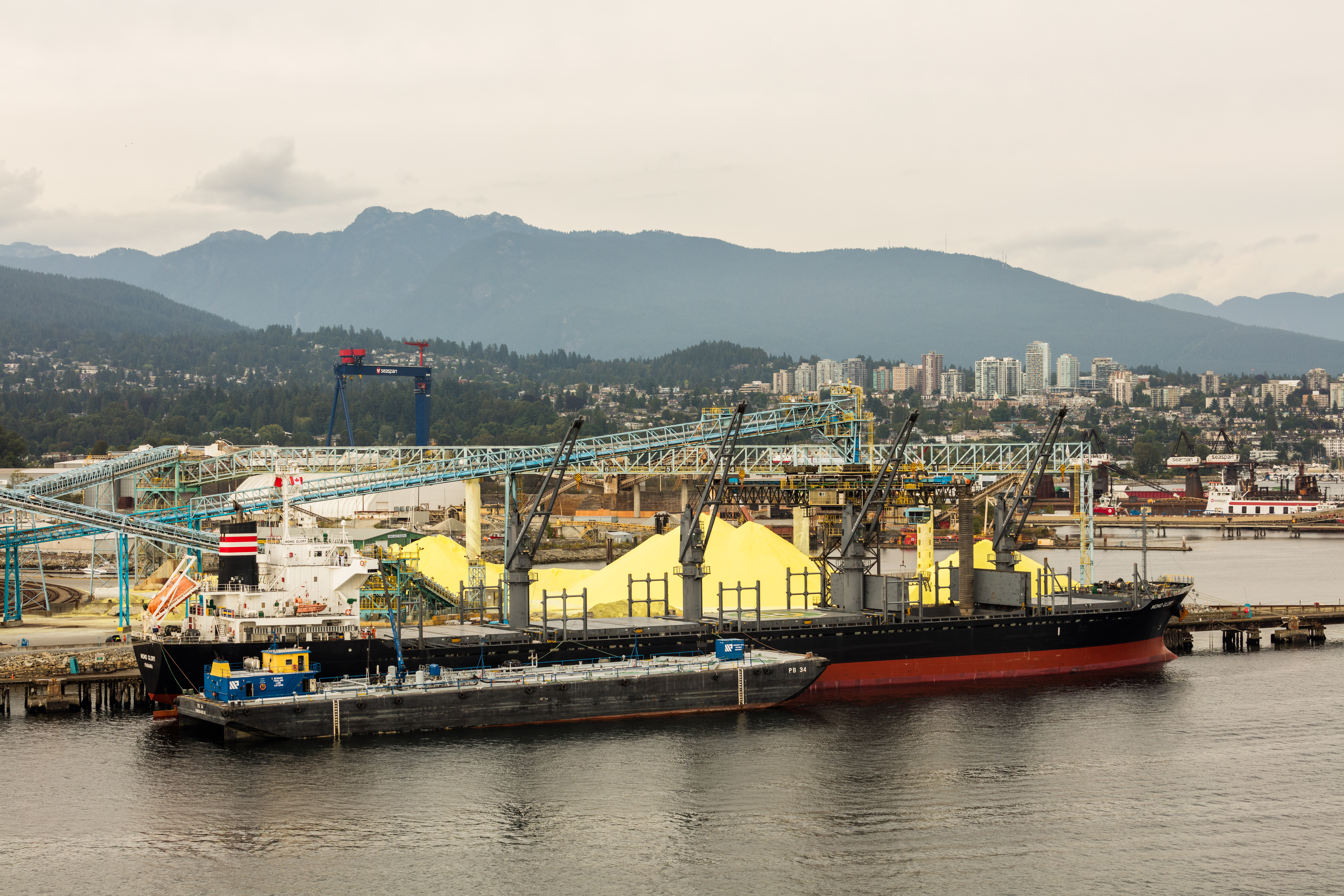
Ship loading sulphur (brimstone).

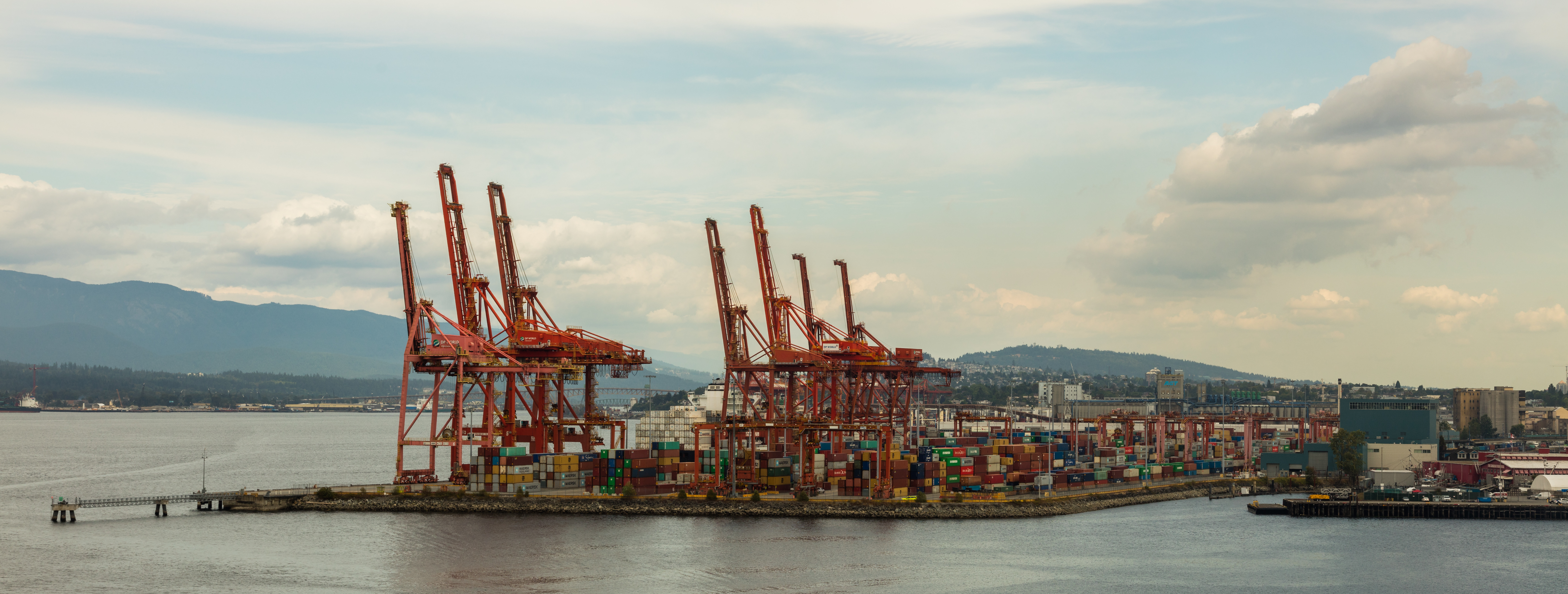
Warehouse to stock goods before or after loading.

Port of Vancouver offers 29 deep-sea and domestic marine terminals that service five business sectors: automobiles, break-bulk, bulk, containers, and cruise.

=== Automobile terminals ===
- Annacis Auto Terminals
- Richmond Auto Terminal

=== Break-bulk terminals ===
- Fraser Surrey Docks
- Lynnterm

=== Bulk terminals ===
- Alliance Grain Terminal
- Cargill
- Cascadia
- Chemtrade Chemicals
- Fibreco
- Fraser Grain Terminal
- G3 Terminal Vancouver
- IOCO
- Lantic Inc.
- Neptune Bulk Terminals
- Pacific Coast Terminals
- Pacific Elevators
- Parkland Terminal
- Richardson International
- Shellburn
- Suncor Energy - Burrard Products Terminal
- Univar Canada Terminal
- Vancouver Wharves
- West Coast Reduction
- Westridge Marine Terminal
- Westshore Terminals

=== Container terminals ===
- Centerm
- Deltaport
- Fraser Surrey Docks
- Vanterm

=== Cruise terminals ===
- Canada Place

== Incidents ==
In January 2019, the cargo ship Ever Summit crashed into a crane. There was no death or injuries.

== Smuggling ==
The port of Vancouver is controlled by the East End Vancouver chapter of the Hells Angels. In August 1994, a report co-written by Mike Toddington and Gary Fotia of the Canada Ports Police stated: "The Hells Angels have extensively infiltrated the operations of the port. Angels are among the first to board arriving ships. They unload the goods, place them for storage, load them onto trucks and prepare the necessary documents for shipping". Local 502 of the International Longshore and Warehouse Union (ILWU) was "littered with members and associates of the Angels. They are placed in key positions that enable them to commit crimes". In 1994, ten "full patch" Hells Angels worked at the port of Vancouver along with at least 30 people with Hells Angels associations. John Bryce, the president of the East End chapter, was a full time employee of the Port of Vancouver as was Robert Robinson and Al Debruyn of the White Rock chapter. Fotia told the journalists Julian Sher and William Marsden: "They're [the Hells Angels] in key positions to have anything moved to where they want it to be moved". Toddington noted that a number of the Hells Angels worked as foremen and that "you could have people putting the containers anywhere they want". In July 1997, the government of Jean Chretien abolished the Canada Ports Police and replaced the ports police with private security guards. The private security guards were and are paid low wages, which saved money as compared to the salaries of the Ports Police, but also made them open to corruption. Furthermore, the private security guards had no weapons, no powers of arrest, and no powers of investigation with the security guards required to report to the local police forces if they saw anything suspicious on the docks. The decision to disband the Canada Ports Police to save $11 million per year has been widely condemned by the police chiefs in port cities as marking the effective end of any effort to stop drug smuggling. Peter Bell, the senior strategic intelligence analyst for the B.C. Organized Crime Agency stated in 2003 that the Hells Angel control not only the waterfront, but also the trucking, maintenance, laundry and garbage services at the port of Vancouver. Bell stated "We see a gathering of players when a certain vessel arrives". Bell noted that a ship came in from Asia in the summer of 2002 at the Fraser Surrey port, a number of Hells Angels who worked as foremen at the Delta and Vancouver ports suddenly moved over to the Fraser Surrey port. Bell stated of the way that a senior foreman and a Hells Angel suddenly took a demotion to work as a junior foreman at the Fraser Surrey port: "It stinks. It sends alarm bells off to use; we knew something was going on". In September 2010, a government report stated: "“The presence of numerous members of organized crime groups (OCGs) as dockside employees of the Port of Vancouver, coupled with the ability to access the port by members of OCGs employed in the trucking industry creates a high-risk for smuggling at the port." A Transport Canada report in 2012 stated that the a number of Mexican cartels such as the Sinaloa Cartel, Los Zetas, the Knights Templar Cartel and the South Pacific Cartel are smuggling cocaine into Canada via the port of Vancouver.

The port of Vancouver is used to smuggle cocaine, methamphetamine, and heroin into Canada while also being used to smuggle cocaine and methamphetamine into Australia, New Zealand, and Southeast Asia. Superintendent Mike Porteous of the Vancouver police stated in 2014: "Vancouver is an international hub for distribution to Southeast Asia and other countries across the water, where as you know the prices are significantly higher". Andy Smith, the president of the British Columbia Maritime Employers' Association, stated in May 2015 about the employment of Hells Angels at the port: "Yes, we are aware of who they are. They make no secret of it". A number of high-profile Hells Angels such as Larry Amero, Vince Brienza, Norm Krogstad, John Bryce, and Gino Zumpano have worked at the port of Vancouver. The hiring of workers at the port is controlled by the ILWU and the B.C. Maritime Employers' Association is merely responsible for training workers sponsored by current members of the ILWU. Several people on the executive board of local 502 of the ILWU have criminal records or ties to organized crime. A report by Transport Canada in April 2017 stated that Port of Vancouver is corrupt as the reported concluded: "To facilitate their smuggling activities, OCGs [organized crime groups] are involved in the corruption of port workers, and have embedded members and associates within port facilities by way of legitimate employment... That it is certain that organized crime groups and transnational criminal organizations will continue to exploit vulnerabilities at B.C.’s marine ports to facilitate smuggling both into and out of Canada (emphasis in the original)".

Australian officials have complained that most of the cocaine and methamphetamine in Australia comes from the port of Vancouver. Commander Clint Sims of the Australian Border Force told Kim Bolan, the crime correspondent of The Vancouver Sun that gangsters': "...tend to use some of the more trusted countries, if you like, that have good reputations around the world and also have a high volume of legitimate cargo coming out to transship illicit goods. We see cartels, particularly from Mexico, moving drugs to countries like Canada for that reason". Assistant Commissioner Mike Pannett of the Australian Federal Police told Bolan that: "Vancouver port is a significant location for us as far as importation of drugs and transshipment of drugs. We see transshipments through a whole lot of ports. Vancouver is one of the bigger ones obviously". Michael Outram, the commissioner of the Australian Border Force stated: "Our per capita drug-consumption rate is amongst the highest in the world. And we also pay very high prices in Australia compared to a lot of other countries. So that makes, unfortunately, the illicit drug market in Australia very lucrative for organized crime and transnational organized crime. We’ve seen some high numbers of detections and seizures at the border". In Australia, one kilogram of methamphetamine sells for $200,000 Australian dollars ($180, 000 Canadian dollars) while in Canada one kilogram of methamphetamine sells between $3, 500-$4, 000 Canadian dollars. The Canadian Hells Angels have identified as key figures in smuggling drugs into Australia via the port of Vancouver along with the Australian Comanchero gang who distribute the drugs once they arrived in Australia.

In January 2024, Mike Farnworth, the Solicitor-General of British Columbia, asked the federal government of Justin Trudeau to restore the Canada Ports Police, stating the "ports are a porous sieve for a lot of criminal activity that is taking place in this country, and we need to be doing a far better job of getting a handle on it than we have been to date". Farnworth stated that the way that Hells Angels control the port of Vancouver to smuggle drugs into Canada and out to nations such as Australia and New Zealand were a serious concern that could be best addressed by restoring the Canada Ports Police. On 23 August 2024, the city of Delta passed a resolution asking for the federal and provincial governments to reestablish the Ports Police under the grounds that smuggling at the Deltaport was rampant. George Harvie, the mayor of Delta, stated to the journalists Srushti Gangdev and Charles Brockman: "It’s no surprise we’re having such vast quantities coming in, because it’s very low risk for the cartels and the gangs that are shipping these products into our country; there’s very little risk for them to be actually caught". Peter German, an expert on money laundering stated for all of the year 2020 106 kilograms of methamphetamines worth $13.5 million were seized by officials at the Deltaport. By contrast, German noted that in 2023 one shipment of 6,330 kilograms of methamphetamine worth $1.5 billion dollars were seized by officials on a container ship that was destined for Australia at the Deltaport. German noted that the drug seizures represented only a small fraction of the drugs that were either shipped out or shipped in. German told Ganddev and Brockman: "Of great concern is the reality that Canada, once a source country for marijuana, nicknamed ‘B.C. bud,’ is now producing deadly drugs for export".

== See also ==
- History of Squamish and Tsleil-Waututh longshoremen, 1863-1963
- List of ports and harbors of the Pacific Ocean

== Books ==
- Sher, Julian; Marsden, William (2003). The Road To Hell How the Biker Gangs Are Conquering Canada. Toronto: Alfred Knopf. ISBN 0-676-97598-4.
