= Roberts Bank Superport =

Port facility in Delta, British Columbia, Canada

Coordinates: 49°01′10″N 123°09′38″W

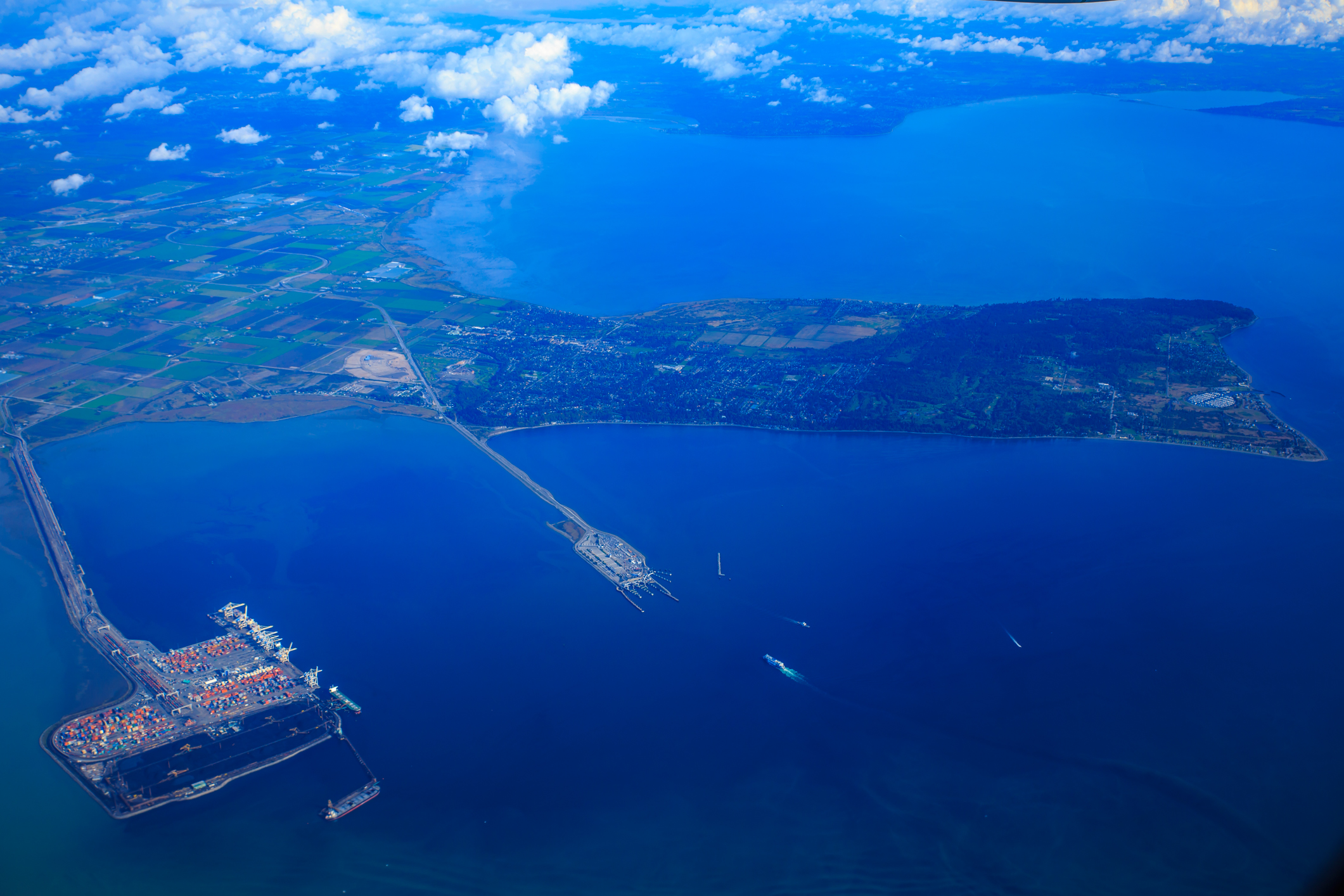
Roberts Bank Superport on the left

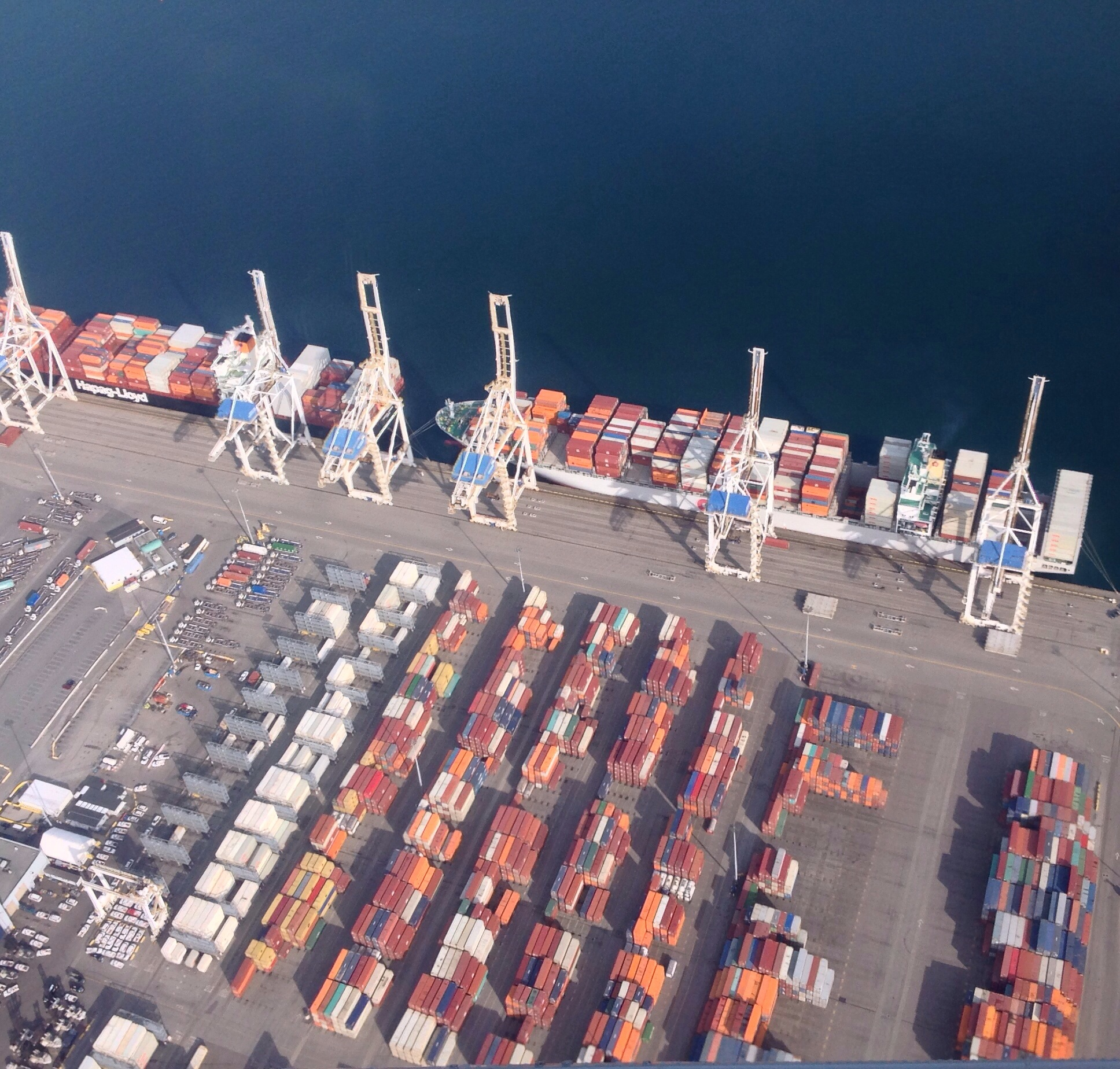
Deltaport aerial view 2014

Location of Roberts Bank Superport in the Greater Vancouver region

Roberts Bank is home to a twin-terminal port facility located on the mainland coastline of the Strait of Georgia in Delta, British Columbia, Canada. Opened in 1970 with Westshore Terminals as its only tenant, Roberts Bank was expanded in 1983–84, and in June 1997 opened a second terminal, the GCT Deltaport container facility.

Part of Port of Vancouver, Roberts Bank is also known as the Outer Harbour of Canada's busiest port. Westshore is the busiest single coal export terminal in North America and is operated by the Westar Group on a long-term contract. It typically ships over 20 million tonnes of export coal a year and early in 2010 completed a $49-million equipment upgrade, bringing its capacity from 24 million to 29 million tonnes per year.

Some of this coal is metallurgical coal from mines in the interior of British Columbia, some of which are operated by Teck Resources. This coal mined within British Columbia pays a provincial carbon tax on its embodied emissions. However, some of the coal exported through the Roberts Bank is mined within the United States, and is exported through Canada to China. Communities along the West Coast of the United States have rejected proposals for coal export terminals for environmental reasons, and so the Roberts Bank Superport is the only way for coal producers in the Powder River Basin to export coal to Asia. The American coal exported through Roberts Bank does not pay a provincial carbon tax. This practice has been criticized by environmentalists in British Columbia.

Like the Tsawwassen Ferry Terminal to the southeast, Roberts Bank was built at the end of a long causeway over a shallow bank. Originally created as a 20-hectare (49-acre) pod of reclaimed land for a major coal port, it is now four times that size. In January 2010, Deltaport added a third berth and doubled its capacity. It is now one of the busiest import/export ports in North America and a major hub for container trucking companies.

Roberts Bank is serviced by the Robert's Bank Rail Corridor, which serves CN Rail, CP Rail, and BNSF Railway trains. It opened on April 16, 1970, under the B.C. Harbours Board. Additionally, Seaspan International provides tugboat services to both terminals at the peninsula.

== Environmental Controversy ==
The planned Roberts Bank Superport expansion has faced opposition from environmental groups and First Nations groups in Canada and the United States over concerns the expansion will lead to the loss of habitat for a number of animal species. Potentially impacted species include Orcas, Salmon, the Western sandpiper, and the barn owl.

=== Sandpipers & Biofilm ===
According to scientists, the migratory Western sandpiper is at risk as the seemingly barren mudflats have a biofilm that provides roughly half of the sandpiper's nutrition during migration. Without this nutrition, many sandpipers may not survive the migration. This danger was highlighted in the 2025 documentary A Sandpipers' Last Supper

=== Environmental Impact Assessment ===
A 2020 Environmental Impact Report concluded that the Superport expansion would have numerous adverse effects. Environment Minister Steven Guilbeault agreed with the report's findings, but said the project was "justified under the circumstances."

=== Court Case ===
On 10 January 2025, a Federal Court dismissed a claim that Canada breached the Species at Risk Act by approving the Superport expansion in early 2023.

== Incidents ==
On December 7, 2012, the Panama-registered and Japan-owned bulk carrier Cape Apricot crashed into a causeway at the Westshore coal terminal, destroying about 100 metres of the structure, including a coal conveyor system, according to the Vancouver Sun. Port Metro Vancouver's Harbour Master said that this was first marine accident in the 42-year history of the coal terminal. The accident resulted in an estimated 30 tonnes of coal going into the water from the severed conveyor and the disabling of the larger of the terminal's two coal-loading berths. It was estimated that reconstruction of the conveyor system would be completed by March 31, 2013. The berth was returned to service in February 2013. Reconstruction of the causeway was completed in late April 2013.

== Additional References ==
- "Roberts Bank (port)". BC Geographical Names. Government of British Columbia – B.C. Geographical Names Office (BCGNO).
