= Economic history of Vancouver =

The economic history of Vancouver traces the development of Vancouver, British Columbia, from a sawmill settlement on Burrard Inlet to Canada's third-largest metropolitan economy. Founded in 1886 as the western terminus of the Canadian Pacific Railway (CPR), the city grew rapidly through successive waves of resource extraction, immigration, port trade, and industrial diversification. Vancouver's deep-water harbour and Pacific Rim position made it Canada's principal gateway to Asian markets, and by the mid-twentieth century it had surpassed Montreal as Canada's busiest port. Today, the Port of Vancouver trades with up to 170 economies and handles more cargo than any other Canadian port. The city's economy rests on port logistics, real estate, technology, film production, mining finance, and tourism, shaped throughout its history by the entrepreneurial contributions of immigrant communities.

== Geographic foundations ==
Vancouver's economic viability derives from its physical geography. Burrard Inlet, a natural deep-water harbour, is one of the best natural harbours on the Pacific coast of North America and remains ice-free year-round—a decisive advantage over Montreal, where the St. Lawrence Seaway closes seasonally and where the port itself did not operate year-round until icebreakers were deployed in 1964. The First Narrows and Second Narrows define the port's geography, while the inlet's sheltered waters allow continuous operations regardless of season.

Vancouver's position on the Great Circle Route gives it shorter shipping distances to major Asian ports than its principal American competitors on the U.S. west coast. The route from Vancouver to Shanghai is approximately 5,450 nautical miles (10,090 km), compared with 5,870 nautical miles (10,870 km) from Los Angeles, saving shippers roughly one to two days per voyage.

The Fraser River and its fertile delta provided $1.6 billion in agricultural output as of 2011 and sustained the salmon fisheries that were among the region's first commercial industries. British Columbia's vast natural resource hinterland—containing one-fifth of Canada's forested land and two-fifths of its marketable timber, along with deposits of copper, gold, coal, and zinc—positioned Vancouver as the service, processing, and export hub for the provincial interior.

The Musqueam people maintained continuous habitation at the mouth of the Fraser River for almost 5,000 years, and the Tsleil-Waututh population may have reached 10,000 before European contact.

== Founding and early settlement ==
=== Sawmill origins ===
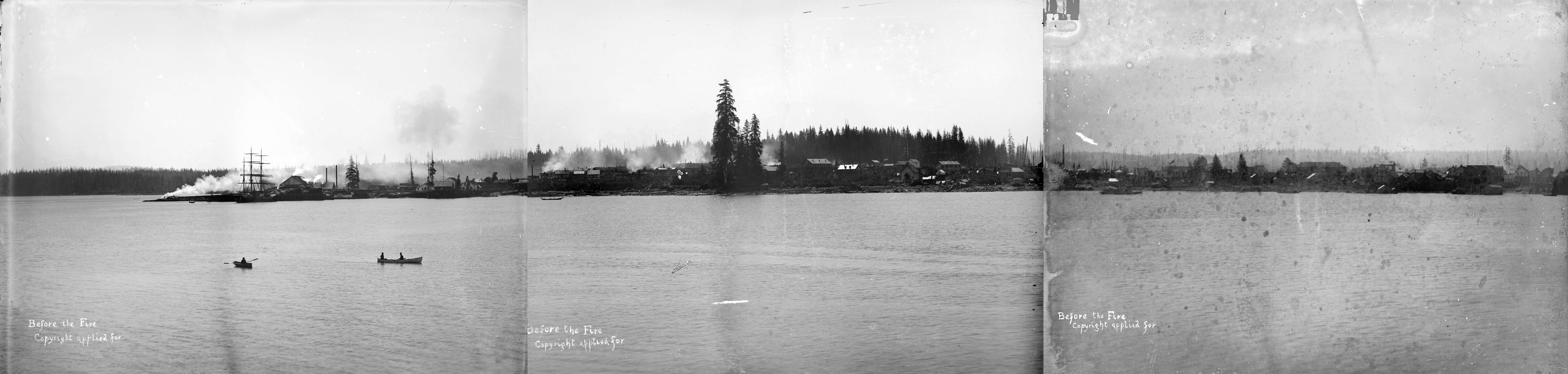
Panoramic view of the Vancouver waterfront, May 1886—one month before the Great Vancouver Fire destroyed the settlement

Vancouver's pre-urban economy centred on two sawmills. In 1864, Sewell Prescott Moody acquired a sawmill on the north shore of Burrard Inlet, which became known as Moodyville. Moody built the settlement into a major lumber exporter and funded the area's first school, library, and Masonic lodge, extending the telegraph at his own expense. On the south shore, Captain Edward Stamp founded the Hastings Mill between 1865 and 1867; the mill became the commercial nucleus around which Vancouver grew. By 1865, lumber had surpassed gold mining as the region's principal economic activity, with exports reaching markets in China, Australia, and South America. Early logging was done by hand, with horses or oxen dragging felled trees along corduroy roads to the water; steam tugs later hauled northern lumber supplies down the coast as surrounding land was deforested.

=== Gastown ===
In 1867, John "Gassy Jack" Deighton, a steamboat pilot and saloonkeeper from Hull, England, arrived at Burrard Inlet. Captain Edward Stamp encouraged Deighton to open a bar to serve mill workers on the south shore. According to local tradition, Deighton offered thirsty mill workers whisky in exchange for building him a saloon; the small shack, called the Globe Saloon was reportedly erected within 24 hours. The settlement that grew around the saloon became known as "Gastown", deriving from Deighton's nickname (a reference to his garrulous storytelling). By 1870 the provincial government formalized it as a six-block townsite named Granville, after Colonial Secretary Lord Granville.

=== The CPR terminus decision ===
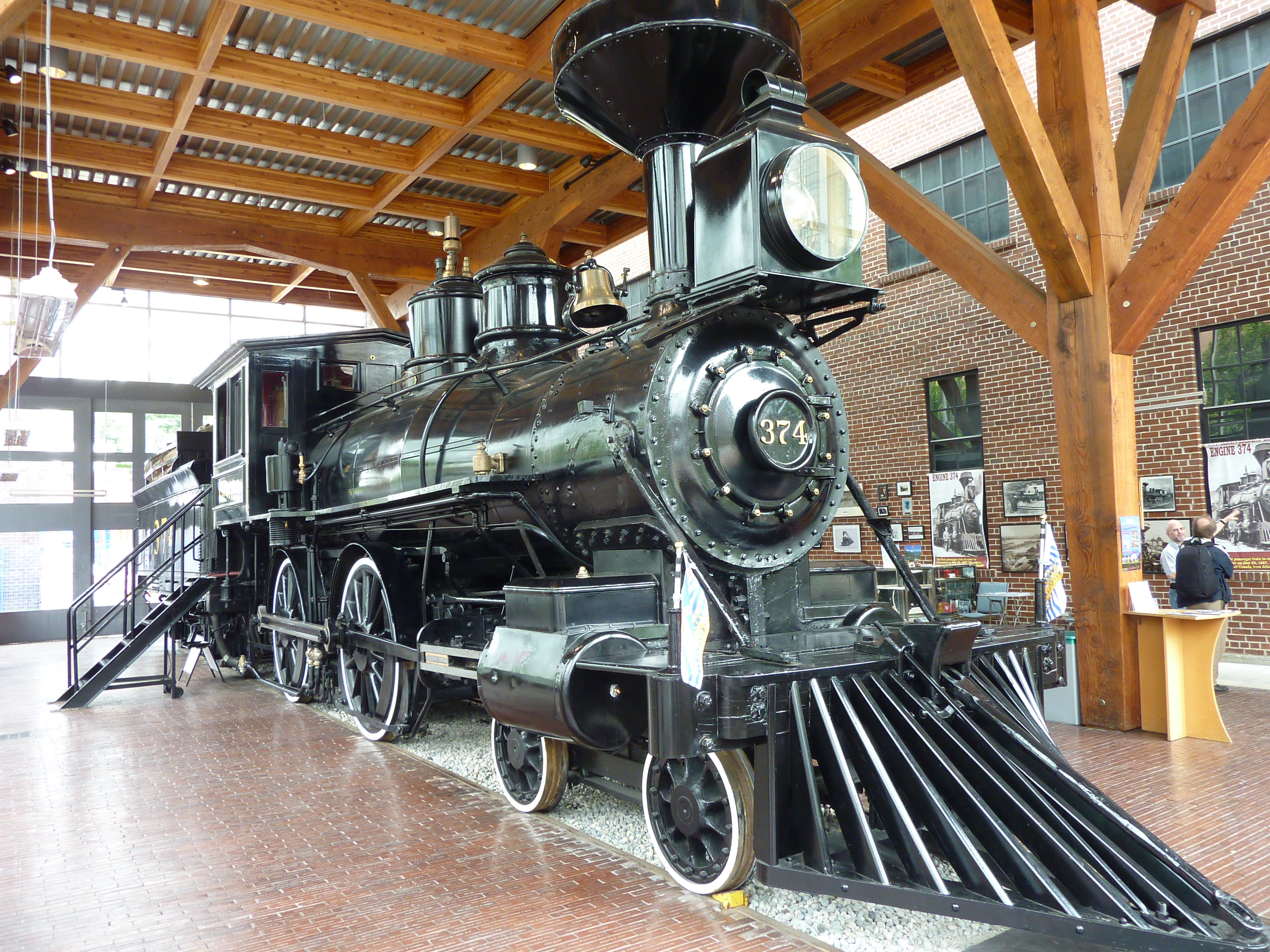
CPR Engine No. 374, which pulled the first transcontinental passenger train into Vancouver on May 23, 1887. Now displayed at the Roundhouse in Yaletown.

The selection of Vancouver as the CPR's western terminus in 1884 was the decisive event in the city's founding. CPR general manager William Van Horne rejected Port Moody due to its treacherous currents, insufficient flat land, and inadequate harbour depth. The provincial government granted the CPR approximately 6,000 acres of Crown land in exchange for extending the railway approximately 12 miles (19 km) west to Granville.

The CPR functioned as city-builder: its land commissioner Lauchlan Hamilton designed the street grid, named streets after company officials (Cambie, Hamilton), and controlled land sales that determined neighbourhood character. Vancouver was, in its origins, a corporate creation.

=== Incorporation, fire, and growth ===
Granville was incorporated as the City of Vancouver on April 6, 1886. Two months later, on June 13, the Great Vancouver Fire destroyed the entire city—between 600 and 1,000 buildings—in under 45 minutes, killing at least 21 people and causing extensive property damage. Rebuilding began within hours; R.H. Alexander, manager of the Hastings Mill, offered free lumber to those forced to rebuild, and a new by-law required all subsequent buildings to be constructed of brick or stone.

The city's population surged from roughly 400 in 1884 to almost 14,000 by 1891. By 1891, nine sawmill companies supported by British and American capital had emerged along the city's waterfront. The first transcontinental passenger train arrived on May 23, 1887, connecting Vancouver to eastern Canada. A continent-wide depression in the mid-1890s temporarily checked growth, but Vancouver overtook Victoria as British Columbia's industrial and commercial centre within a decade of its founding.

== Early industrialists ==
Vancouver's early economy was shaped by a small number of entrepreneurs who built the city's commercial foundations through private enterprise.

David Oppenheimer (1834–1897) settled in Vancouver in 1885 and formed the Vancouver Improvement Company in 1886. As mayor from 1888 to 1891, he built critical infrastructure including waterworks, streets, and electric lighting, and is regarded as one of the city's founding figures.

John Hendry (1843–1916) created British Columbia's first forestry conglomerate, the BC Mills, Timber and Trading Company, incorporated in 1889. He introduced steam donkeys and logging railways that set the model for the twentieth-century lumber industry. Hendry was designated a Person of National Historic Significance by the Government of Canada in 1988.

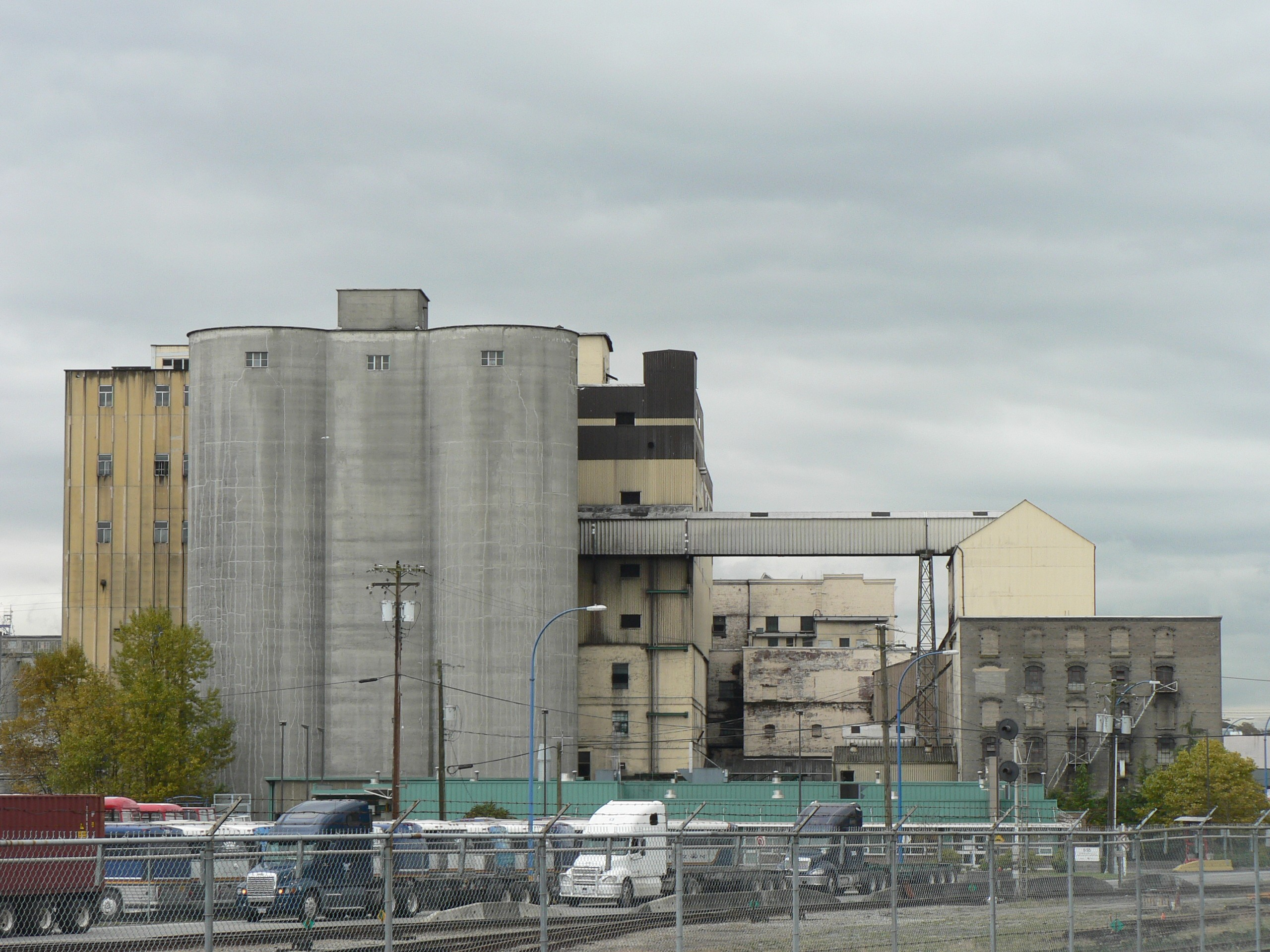
The Rogers Sugar Refinery on the Vancouver waterfront. Founded in 1890, it was the city's first major industry not based on logging or fishing.

Benjamin Tingley Rogers (1865–1918) founded the British Columbia Sugar Refining Company in 1890, securing investment from CPR directors including Sir Donald Smith and William Van Horne. The sugar refinery was Vancouver's first major industry not based on logging or fishing.

H.R. MacMillan (1885–1976), appointed British Columbia's first Chief Forester in 1912, established the H.R. MacMillan Export Company in 1919. Through merger with Bloedel, Stewart and Welch in 1951, the resulting MacMillan Bloedel controlled nearly one million acres of forest land and accounted for one-third of the province's lumber exports.

Charles Woodward (1842–1937) founded Woodward's department store in 1892, which grew to 25 locations and became the largest retailer in Western Canada before filing for bankruptcy protection in December 1992.

== Immigration and entrepreneurship ==
=== Chinese entrepreneurs and Chinatown ===
==== CPR labour and transition to business ====
Between 1881 and 1884, as many as 17,000 Chinese men came to British Columbia to work on the CPR, representing approximately 75% of the railway workforce in the province. Contractor Andrew Onderdonk recruited workers from Guangdong province. Chinese workers received substantially less pay than their white counterparts and were assigned the most dangerous tasks; hundreds died from accidents, cold, illness, and malnutrition.

When the railway was completed in 1885, surviving workers settled around Dupont Street (later East Pender Street), a low-lying area near the docks and lumberyards—establishing the basis of Vancouver's permanent Chinese community. With the depletion of gold fields in the British Columbia interior, Chinese workers turned to food processing, market gardening, the canning industry, laundries, restaurants, and small retail. Business activity became a key avenue of immigrant adjustment, as documented by historian Paul Yee in his studies of Chinese commerce in early Vancouver.

Chinese laundries were among the earliest businesses because of low startup costs and occupational exclusion from other trades. By 1900, there were 36 Chinese laundries in Chinatown alone. Chinese market gardening became essential to Vancouver's food economy; a BC judge testified before the 1885 Royal Commission on Chinese Immigration that Chinese farmers produced the greater part of the vegetables grown in the province. Chinese workers were also central to the British Columbia salmon canning industry, performing the most labour-intensive tasks under a contract labour system in which Chinese middlemen supplied workers to cannery owners at fixed rates.

==== Key entrepreneurs ====
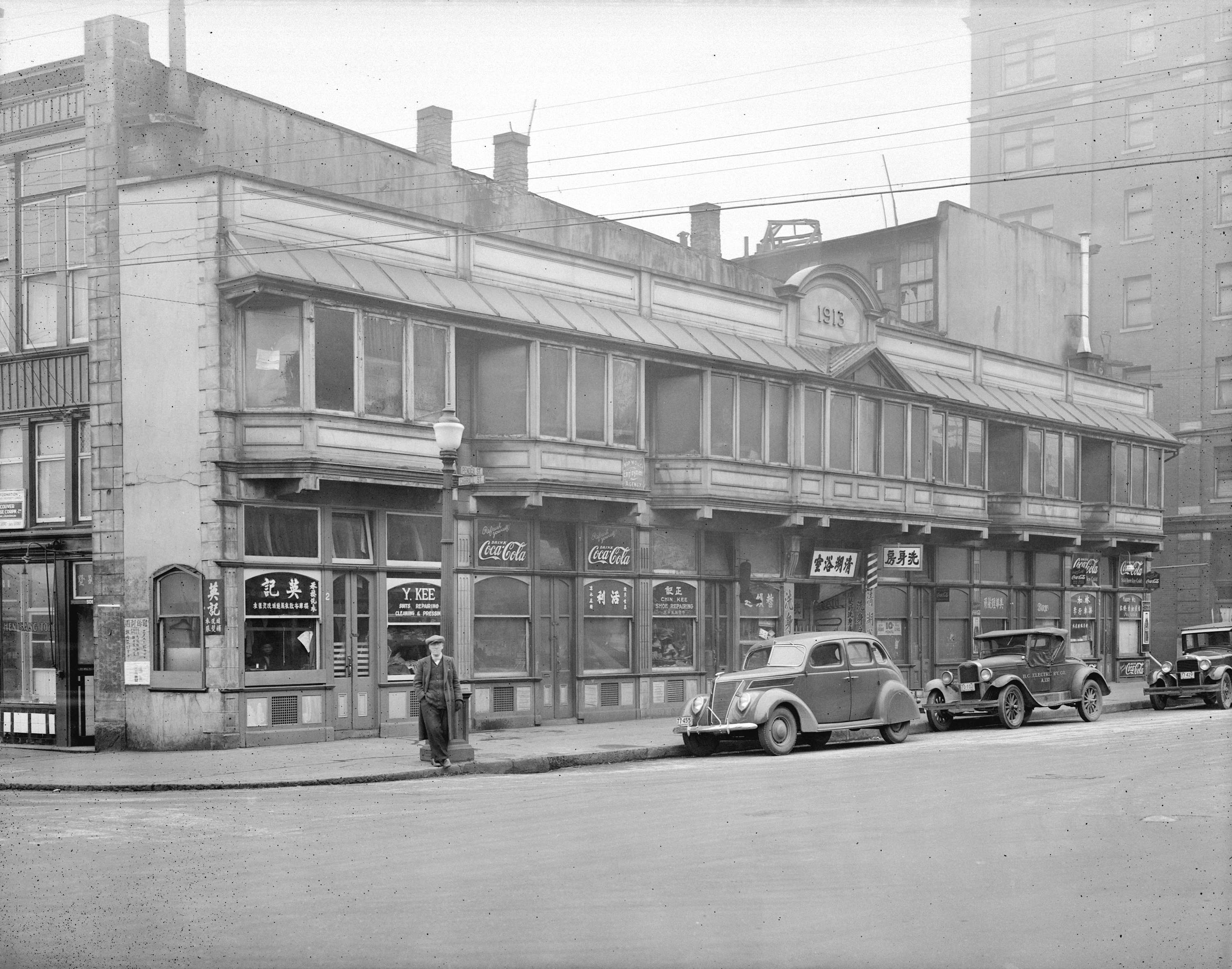
The Sam Kee Building at Pender and Carrall Streets, 1937. Built in 1913 after the city expropriated part of Chang Toy's lot, it is listed in the Guinness World Records as the world's narrowest commercial building.

Chang Toy (1857–1921), also known as Sam Kee, rose from contract labourer to become one of the leading merchants of British Columbia. His Sam Kee Company grew into an import-export enterprise with extensive real estate holdings. When the City of Vancouver expropriated part of his Pender Street lot in 1912—reducing its width to just 6 feet (1.8 m)—Chang Toy constructed a viable two-storey commercial building on the remaining strip. The Sam Kee Building (1913) is listed in the Guinness World Records as the narrowest commercial building in the world.

Yip Sang (1845–1927), who served as superintendent of Chinese labour for the CPR, established the Wing Sang Company in 1888. The firm handled import-export trade, labour contracting, and money remittance between Vancouver and Hong Kong, with annual revenue of $50,000 and real estate holdings exceeding $200,000 by 1908.

Hok Yat Louie arrived from the Pearl River Delta in Guangdong, paying the head tax, and became a market gardener in Burnaby. In 1903, he founded the Kwong Chong Company as a wholesale grocery business selling seed, fertilizer, and groceries, which was renamed the H.Y. Louie Co. in 1927. Despite facing severe discrimination from established distributors—who blocked his access to suppliers, refused loans, and required advance payment—Louie built a successful wholesale operation serving as an intermediary between Chinese market gardeners and white grocers. After his death in 1934, his sons expanded the business, acquiring the IGA franchise for British Columbia in 1955 and purchasing London Drugs in 1976.

Won Alexander Cumyow (1861–1955), the first known person of Chinese descent born in what would become Canada, served for decades as a court interpreter in Vancouver. He was barred from voting and from the legal profession due to discriminatory laws—a source of particular injustice given his deep knowledge of the Canadian legal system. In 2024, the Government of Canada recognized Cumyow as a person of national historic significance.

==== State restrictions and entrepreneurial response ====
Chinese immigrants faced escalating state restrictions. The federal government imposed a head tax of $50 in 1885, increased to $100 in 1900 and $500 in 1903. Between 1885 and 1923, over 97,000 Chinese immigrants paid the tax, generating some $23 million in government revenue.

The Chinese Exclusion Act (1923–1947) virtually halted Chinese immigration; Chinese Canadians referred to its enactment date of July 1 as "Humiliation Day." As few as 12 to as many as 50 Chinese were admitted to Canada during the entire 24-year exclusion period. Canada's Chinese population dropped by approximately 25% between 1921 and 1951. By 1941, among nearly 30,000 Chinese men in Canada, more than 80% had wives and children remaining in China, creating a "bachelor society" that constrained community growth and economic development.

Provincial legislation compounded federal restrictions. In 1872, British Columbia's first Legislative Assembly stripped Chinese (and Indigenous) residents of the provincial vote. Because the voter roll determined eligibility for professional licensing, this effectively barred Chinese residents from careers in law, medicine, pharmacy, and accounting. In 1919, the province forbade white women from working in businesses owned by Asian persons until legislation was repealed in 1968. Racial covenants in property deeds restricted Chinese ownership in most Vancouver neighbourhoods; properties in areas such as the British Properties in West Vancouver explicitly barred anyone of "African or Asiatic" descent.

Chinese entrepreneurs adapted through vertical integration, mutual aid associations, labour contracting systems, and—in some cases—the use of Anglo-European fronts to circumvent restrictions on property ownership and business licensing. By 1923, Vancouver's Chinatown had 26 clan associations functioning as mutual aid, credit, and business networks; by 1937, there were 46.

==== Chinatown's economic geography ====
Chinatown emerged at the intersection of Carrall Street and Dupont Street (renamed East Pender Street in 1907), shaped by both economic opportunity—proximity to waterfront employment—and racial exclusion through discriminatory housing covenants. The neighbourhood contained approximately 60 businesses by 1900 and reached its residential peak in the 1920s, when it was virtually self-contained with two Chinese theatres, six schools, a hospital, a library, and a large number of clan and association buildings. Vancouver's Chinatown had eclipsed Victoria's as the largest in Canada.

In 1967, the City approved plans for an elevated eight-lane freeway through the heart of Chinatown along Carrall Street. Community leaders Walter and Mary Lee Chan, along with Bessie Lee, co-founded the Strathcona Property Owners and Tenants Association (SPOTA) in 1968 to oppose the freeway and the broader urban renewal program then underway in Strathcona. After years of what became known as the "Chinatown Freeway Debates," anti-freeway candidates won a majority on city council in 1972, and the freeway was cancelled. Chinatown was designated a historic area in 1971 and a National Historic Site of Canada in 2011. From the 1980s, Chinese commercial activity increasingly dispersed to Richmond and other suburban centres.

=== Japanese-Canadian economic contributions ===
The first Japanese immigrants arrived in Steveston in 1887, mainly from Wakayama Prefecture, drawn by the abundance of salmon in the Fraser River. Japanese Canadian fishermen were early adopters of new technology such as gasoline engines, which allowed for larger boats and greater catches. By 1919, two-thirds of the fishing licences on the Fraser River were held by Japanese Canadians, most of whom owned their own boats. Before World War II, Steveston's Japanese community constituted roughly two-thirds of the town's population, with Nikkei-owned businesses lining Moncton Street. The Japanese Fishermen's Benevolent Society, formed in 1897, built Richmond's first hospital in 1900, open to all residents regardless of background.

In Vancouver's Japantown neighbourhood on Powell Street, the number of Japanese-owned stores and businesses reached 578 by 1921. The district was home to restaurants, hotels, shops, three daily Japanese-language newspapers, several Buddhist churches, and a Japanese language school with as many as one thousand students. Japanese Canadians also dominated the Fraser Valley berry industry; the 1941 berry yield equalled the equivalent of 190 freight trains. The Haney Nokai (Farmer's Association) functioned as an agricultural cooperative, helping Japanese Canadian growers break into mainstream markets through a quota system that prevented market saturation.

The 1942 internment uprooted approximately 22,000 Japanese Canadians—90% of the country's Japanese population. On December 8, 1941, the Royal Canadian Navy began seizing fishing boats; approximately 1,200 vessels were confiscated across the BC coast. An order-in-council signed on January 19, 1943, authorized the Custodian of Enemy Property to liquidate all Japanese Canadian property—homes, farms, businesses, and personal belongings—despite initial government promises to hold it in trust. Property was sold at forced-sale prices in weekly auctions from September 1943 through 1947. In 1986, Price Waterhouse valued the total economic loss at $443 million in 1986 dollars. The berry yield dropped by approximately 84% in the year following the community's removal, demonstrating the community's central role in the regional agricultural economy. Japanese Canadians were excluded from the British Columbia coast until March 31, 1949. On September 22, 1988, Prime Minister Brian Mulroney formally apologized and announced a $300-million redress package, including $21,000 for each of the approximately 13,000 survivors.

=== South Asian economic contributions ===
South Asian immigration to British Columbia began in earnest in the early 1900s; by 1908, 5,179 South Asian men—the vast majority Punjabi Sikhs—were in the province. They found employment primarily in lumber mills, railroad construction, and logging. At Fraser Mills in Coquitlam, over one hundred Sikhs worked in the early 1900s.

The Canadian government adopted restrictive measures to curtail South Asian immigration. Two orders-in-council effectively stopped all immigration from India: a "continuous journey" regulation issued on January 8, 1908—which required immigrants to arrive directly from their country of origin on a non-stop voyage, an effective impossibility from India—and a requirement that immigrants of Asian origin possess $200 in cash, imposed on June 3, 1908. From a peak of nearly 5,500 in 1908, only approximately 700 Sikhs remained in Canada by 1918.

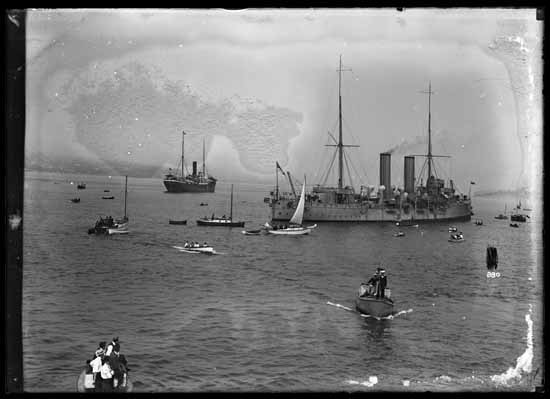
The Komagata Maru and HMCS Rainbow in Vancouver Harbour, 1914. Photograph by Leonard Frank.

In 1914, the steamship Komagata Maru arrived in Vancouver harbour carrying 376 passengers—340 Sikhs, 24 Muslims, and 12 Hindus—from Punjab, British India. The voyage had been organized by Gurdit Singh, a Sikh businessman. Despite being British subjects, the passengers were denied entry under the continuous journey regulation. Only 24 passengers, those who could prove prior Canadian residency, were permitted to disembark. The ship remained anchored in Vancouver harbour for two months before being forced to depart.

The Punjabi Market was founded in 1970 on Main Street near 49th Avenue by Sucha Singh Claire. During its peak in the 1980s and 1990s, over 300 shops operated in the district. Sikhs have since established a dominant presence in the Canadian trucking industry as well as in real estate development and forestry.

=== Hong Kong capital and the 1990s transformation ===
The 1984 Sino-British Joint Declaration triggered a wave of emigration from Hong Kong. A large wave of Hongkongers moved to Canada between 1984 and 1997, peaking at 48,000 arrivals in 1994. Canada's Immigrant Investor Program fast-tracked wealthy businesspeople who invested substantially in Canada.

The most emblematic investment was Hong Kong billionaire Li Ka-shing's 1988 purchase of 82 hectares of former Expo 86 lands on False Creek for $320 million. The resulting Concord Pacific Place became one of North America's largest master-planned urban communities.

As of 2016, there were 15,285 investor immigrant households in British Columbia, representing an estimated capital inflow of approximately $15.3 billion.

In Richmond, the demographic transformation was dramatic. Chinese-descent residents became the majority population by the 2016 census. Developer Thomas Fung built Aberdeen Centre—named after the Aberdeen district on Hong Kong Island—which opened in 1990 as North America's first Asian-themed shopping mall. Initially struggling to find tenants, Fung offered to buy a 50% equity stake in any store that opened, with an option for tenants to buy back the shares interest-free if business flourished; almost 95% of tenants successfully bought back their shares within a year. Aberdeen remained the flagship of Richmond's approximately dozen Asian malls, most built during a construction frenzy in the 1990s by Hong Kong, Taiwanese, and Japanese developers.

Research by geographer David Ley at the University of British Columbia found that investor immigrants declared average total income of only $11,918 in the 1997 tax year which was less than the average for all immigrants and refugees. A significant proportion maintained income-earning activities in Asia while their families resided in Vancouver, a pattern known as the "astronaut family" phenomenon; by 1991, 40% of Vancouver's Hong Kong Chinese migrants had lived in such transnational arrangements.

=== Other communities ===
Italian immigrants began arriving in the 1880s and initially found work in construction, where they came to hold a dominant position. By the 1940s and 1950s, a vibrant community had formed along Commercial Drive. An eight-block stretch was officially declared "Little Italy" in 2016. The Greek community concentrated in Kitsilano after World War II, where Greek was the second most common language in the 1971 census. Most of British Columbia's 172,915 Filipino Canadians reside in Greater Vancouver, with economic contributions concentrated in healthcare, caregiving, and hospitality. North Vancouver hosts one of the largest clusters of Iranian Canadians (22,290 in the 2021 census), with Lonsdale Avenue serving as an informal commercial district.

From the 2010s, technology-sector immigration reshaped the workforce, with companies including Amazon (3,000 jobs in Vancouver) and Microsoft establishing major offices. British Columbia's Provincial Nominee Program Tech stream has nominated approximately 6,000 tech workers since its 2017 launch.

== The port economy ==
=== CPR trans-Pacific service ===
The first international shipment from Vancouver's port occurred in November 1864, when the barque Ellen Lewis departed Burrard Inlet with lumber bound for Adelaide, Australia. The port became well established after the CPR's arrival in 1886.

In 1887, the CPR launched trans-Pacific steamship service between Vancouver and Asia, initially with chartered ships carrying tea and silk. By 1891, three Empress liners operated the Hong Kong–Yokohama–Vancouver route. Vancouver's northern Pacific routes were shorter to China and Japan than those of American competitors, allowing the CPR to dominate the trade. Silk trains—carrying perishable raw silk under armed guard—ran faster than passenger trains, reflecting the immense value of the cargo.

=== Grain elevator era ===
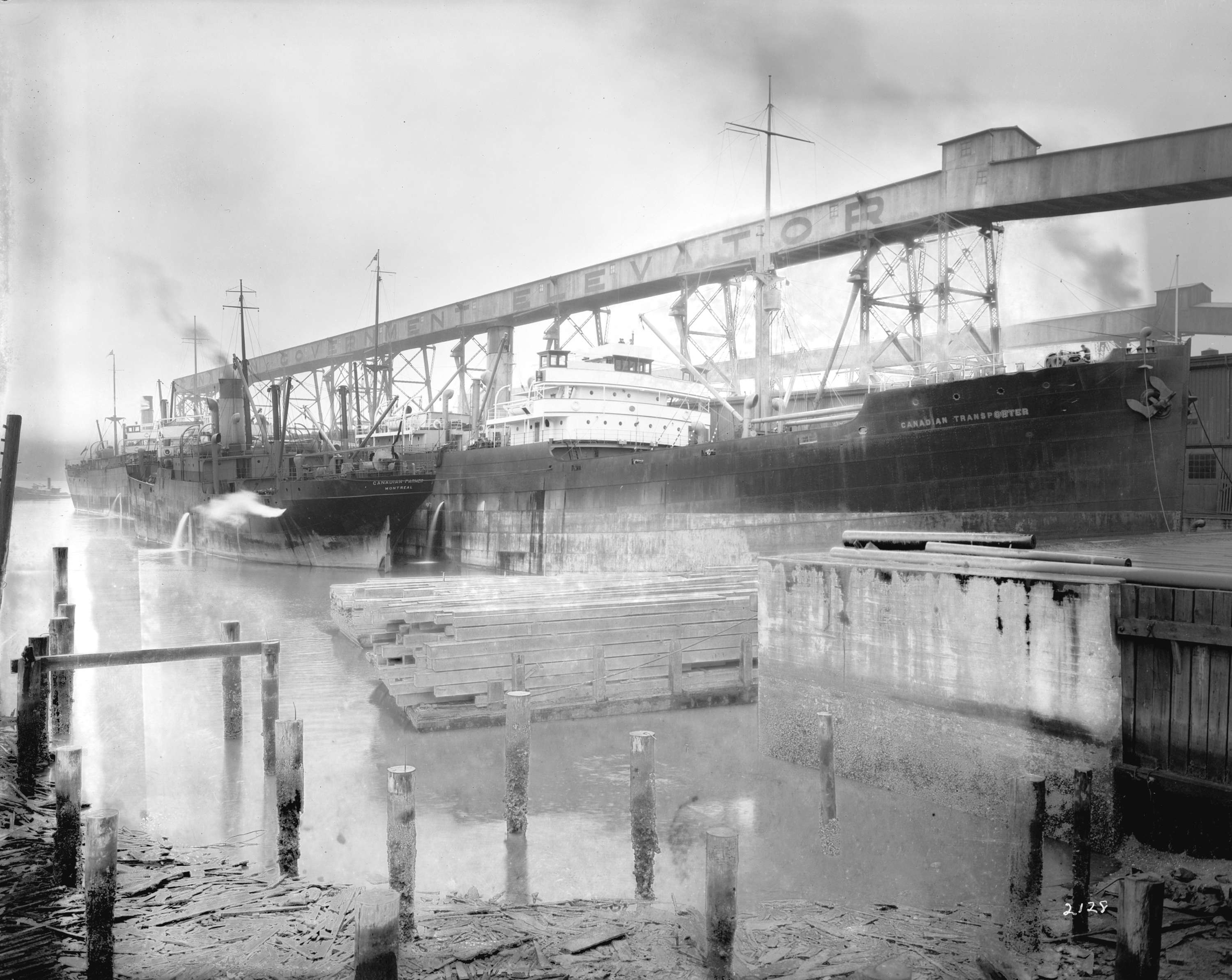
Canadian Government Merchant Marine ships in Vancouver, with waterfront grain elevator infrastructure. The Panama Canal opened in 1914, enabling western grain to reach European markets and transforming Vancouver's port.

The opening of the Panama Canal in 1914 transformed Vancouver's port by enabling western grain exports to reach European markets without the long route around Cape Horn. Vancouver's first grain elevator, constructed in 1916, was initially derided as "Stevens' Folly" (after Vancouver MP H. H. Stevens) because it sat unused for seven years. When grain shipments finally materialized, it became essential infrastructure. The Alberta Wheat Pool terminal opened in 1928, and the Crow's Nest Pass freight rate agreements helped make western grain exports economically viable. Vancouver eventually surpassed Montreal as Canada's leading port, a position enabled by the Panama Canal's elimination of Montreal's historic advantage for transatlantic trade.

=== Wartime shipbuilding ===
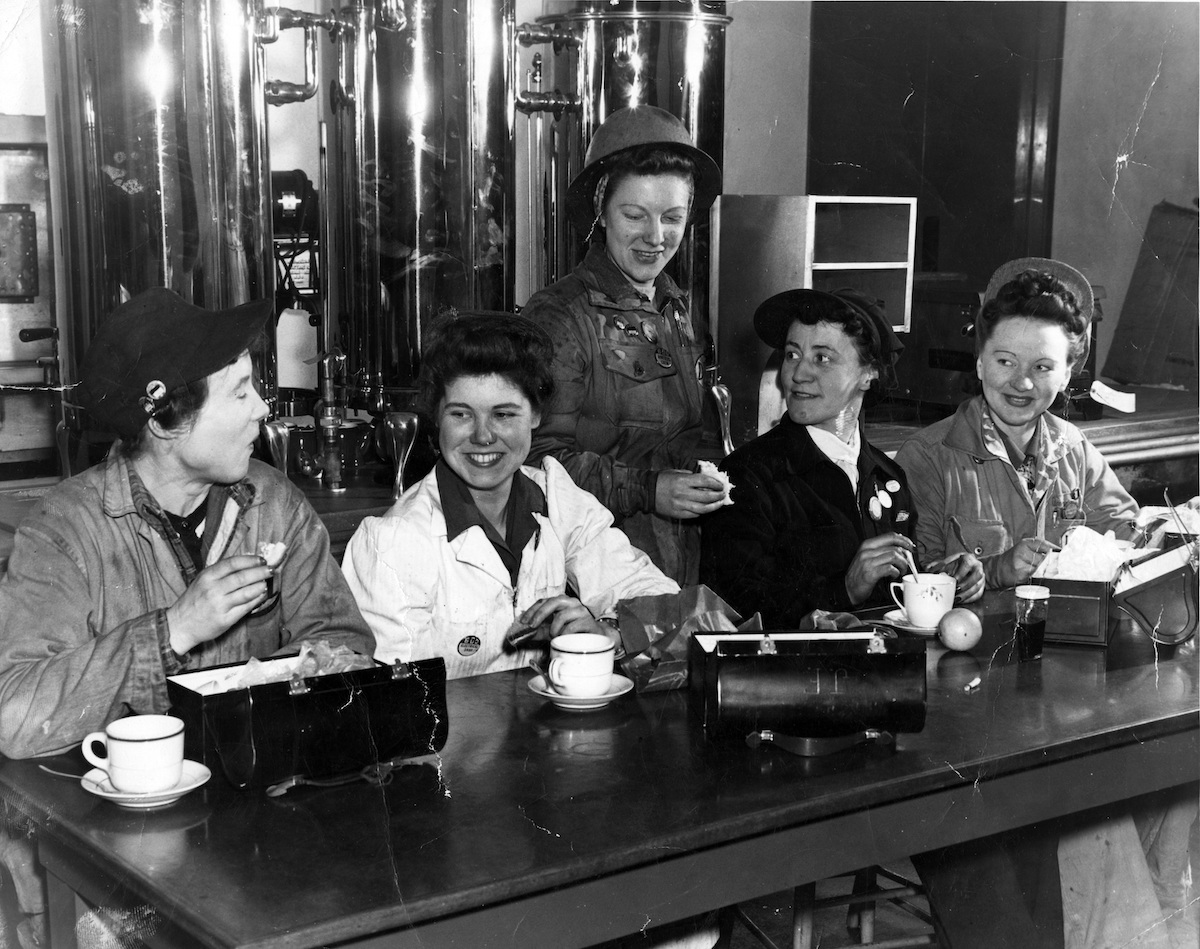
Shop stewards at Burrard Dry Dock, which employed approximately 14,000 workers at peak capacity and built 109 cargo ships during World War II—more than any other yard in Canada

During World War II, the Burrard Dry Dock became British Columbia's largest shipyard employer, building 109 cargo ships (Park and Fort class)—more than any other yard in Canada—with approximately 14,000 workers at peak capacity. The shipbuilding industry helped diversify the local economy beyond its dependence on logging and fishing.

=== Containerization and Roberts Bank ===
The first container ship to call at Vancouver, M.S. Axel Johnson, arrived in 1969. Vanterm opened in 1975. Roberts Bank Superport, officially opened on June 15, 1970, by Prime Minister Pierre Trudeau and Premier W.A.C. Bennett, became the busiest single coal export terminal in North America.

=== Modern scale ===
In 2024, the Port of Vancouver handled a record 158 million metric tonnes of cargo and 3.47 million TEUs, trading with up to 170 nations. Top partners were China (46 MMT), Japan (19 MMT), and South Korea (18 MMT). As of a 2021 economic impact study, the port supported 132,400 jobs and contributed $16.3 billion to Canada's GDP.

== Key industries ==
=== Lumber and forestry ===
From the Hastings Mill in 1865 through the mechanization of the early twentieth century, forestry was the backbone of British Columbia's economy. At its peak in 1984, the forestry industry nationally was worth $23 billion per year and employed one in ten Canadians. MacMillan Bloedel controlled one-third of BC lumber exports before its 1999 acquisition by Weyerhaeuser. By the 1990s, forestry employed only five percent of the province's workforce and contributed half of what it had to provincial GDP thirty years earlier. BC contains one-fifth of Canada's forested land.

=== Fishing and canning ===
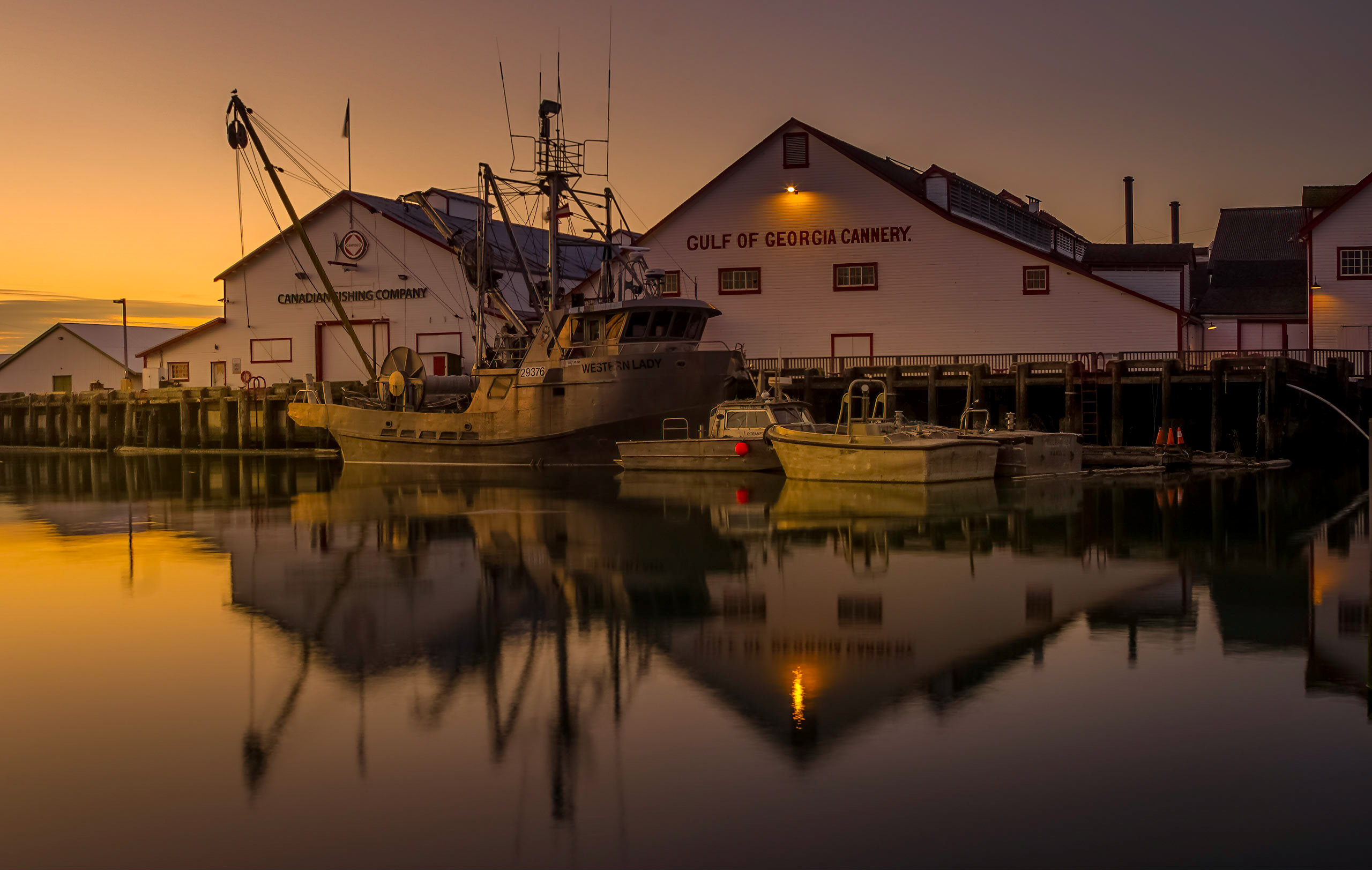
The Gulf of Georgia Cannery in Steveston, a National Historic Site. Built in 1894, it was one of the largest canneries on the British Columbia coast.

The Fraser River salmon canning industry began with the Annieville Cannery, built in 1870 by Alexander Loggie and partners. John Sullivan Deas established a separate cannery on Deas Island in 1873. BC salmon was primarily canned, enabling global export. The first commercial pack in 1871 consisted of fewer than 2,000 salmon filling 300 cases; within two decades, the industry had expanded dramatically, heavily dependent on Chinese labour. BC Packers, formed in 1902 by purchasing several canning operations, became the dominant processor on the coast following reorganization in 1928. Its "Clover Leaf" brand became the leading canned salmon brand in Canada.

Wild-origin Pacific salmon populations have been in marked decline since the 1960s. Fraser River sockeye—historically the largest and most carefully monitored population—saw adult returns decline dramatically to historic lows by 2020. The decline was driven by climate change, habitat loss, and fishery management issues, severely impacting coastal communities from Steveston to Prince Rupert.

=== Mining finance ===
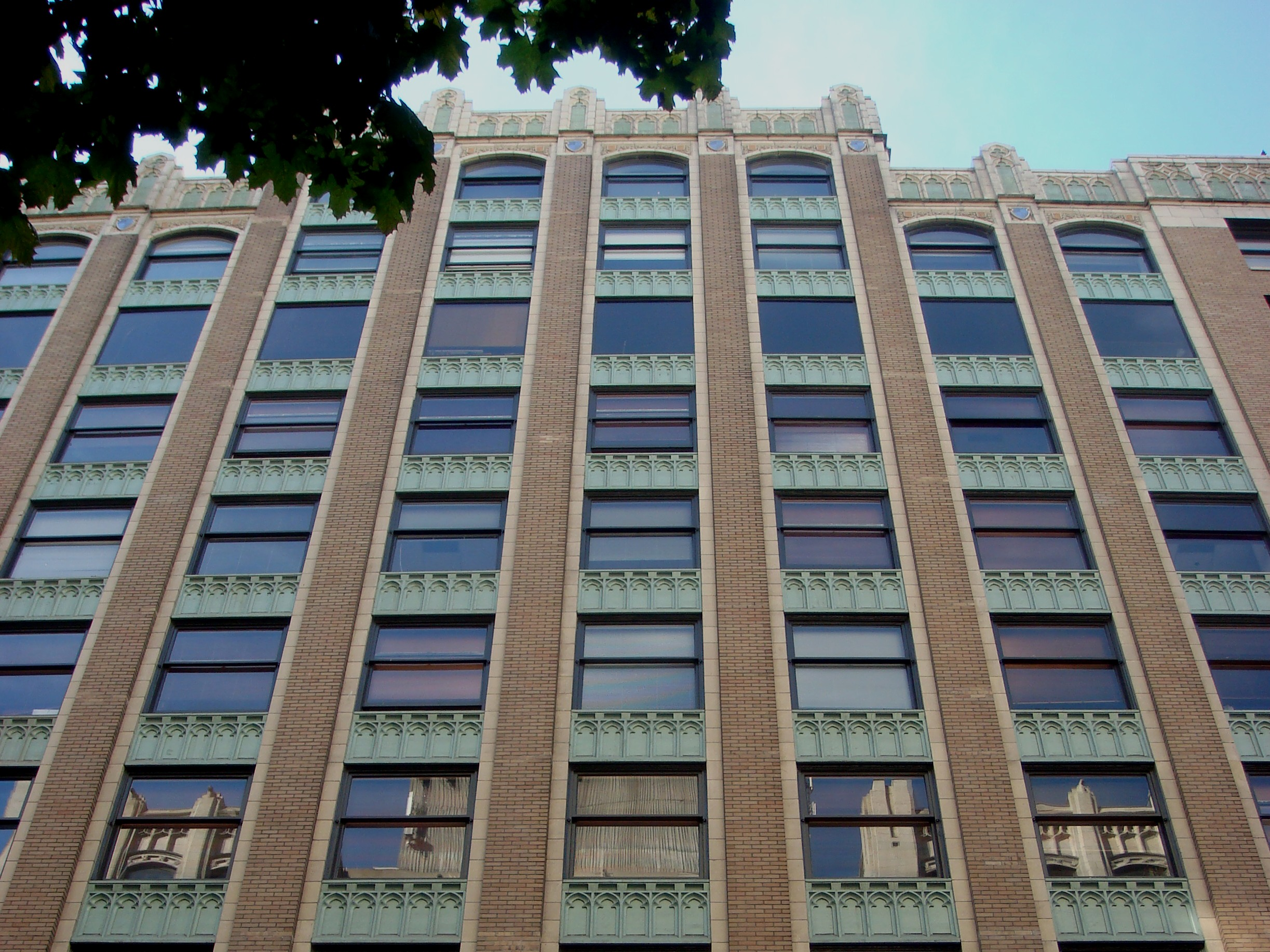
The Vancouver Stock Exchange Building at 475 Howe Street, opened in 1929

The Vancouver Stock Exchange (VSE), incorporated in 1906, specialized in junior mining and exploration stocks. With a minimum listing requirement of just $600,000, it listed over 2,000 companies at its peak, making Vancouver the penny stock capital of Canada. In 1989, Forbes labelled the VSE the "scam capital of the world"; a study found that five of every six investors lost money on the exchange.

The VSE merged with the Alberta Stock Exchange in 1999 to form the Canadian Venture Exchange, which was acquired by the TSX Group in 2001 and renamed the TSX Venture Exchange. Today, the TSX and TSXV together list approximately 40% of the world's publicly listed mining companies, maintaining Vancouver's role as a global mining finance centre.

=== Film and visual effects ===
Vancouver is the third-largest entertainment production centre in North America, earning the informal designation "Hollywood North". The provincial government established a film development office in 1977, and the industry began growing significantly in the late 1970s when Hollywood started decentralizing production and the favourable exchange rate attracted producers to British Columbia. The X-Files filmed its first five seasons (1993–1998) in Vancouver, demonstrating the city could deliver major productions on time and on budget. The Stargate franchise filmed all its series in Vancouver, spending hundreds of millions of dollars in the region.

In 2014, Sony Pictures Imageworks relocated its headquarters from Culver City to Vancouver, where the studio grew to employ over 700 artists. Industrial Light & Magic established a Vancouver presence in 2011 and opened a permanent studio in 2014, and Image Engine earned an Academy Award nomination for District 9 (2009). British Columbia's film and television industry reached a record $4.8 billion in direct spending in 2021, employing approximately 65,000 workers. Since 2012, the industry has spent approximately $31 billion on the provincial economy, with $17 billion going toward salaries and wages. The province hosts the world's largest cluster of visual effects companies, with over 100 firms.

=== Technology ===
Vancouver's technology sector traces to Distinctive Software, founded in Burnaby in January 1983 by Don Mattrick and Jeff Sember. Known for the Test Drive series, it was acquired by Electronic Arts in 1991 for $11 million. EA Vancouver became the company's largest and oldest studio and houses one of the world's largest video game testing operations.

Notable companies founded in Vancouver include Flickr (2004, co-founded by Stewart Butterfield and Caterina Fake); Hootsuite (2008, founded in Gastown by Ryan Holmes); and Slack—born as Tiny Speck in 2009 when Butterfield's team repurposed an internal messaging tool from a failed multiplayer game. Slack was acquired by Salesforce for US$27.7 billion in 2021, making it one of the most valuable products ever to originate from the city. When Craigslist expanded outside the United States for the first time in 2001, Vancouver was the first non-American city selected.

By 2023, the city had approximately 111,000 tech workers, representing a 69% increase over five years—the fastest growth rate in North America. Vancouver's comparatively lower salary costs relative to Silicon Valley and Seattle served as an incentive for US companies to expand northward, contributing to the city's informal designation as "Silicon Valley North." Amazon became the largest corporate office tenant in downtown Vancouver.

=== Real estate ===
Real estate has been a defining feature of Vancouver's economy since the CPR's original land grants. The pre-World War I boom established the pattern: real estate speculation as the city's dominant economic activity, driven by transportation infrastructure and population growth. Li Ka-shing's 1988 purchase of the Expo 86 lands and the resulting Concord Pacific Place development set the standard for the modern era, integrating community amenity contributions into the development process—a signature feature of "Vancouverism", the urban development style for which the city became internationally recognized.

Between 2015 and 2016, single-family home prices surged by 28.2% in a single year. In response, the provincial government introduced a foreign buyer tax in August 2016, initially set at 15% (raised to 20% in 2018), which reduced foreign buyers' share of single-family home transactions from around 13.2% to 1.7% within three months. The City of Vancouver introduced an Empty Homes Tax in 2017, and the province added a Speculation and Vacancy Tax in 2018. Despite these measures, in 2025 Demographia ranked Vancouver as the fourth least affordable major housing market in the world, with a median multiple of 11.8, classified as "impossibly unaffordable". Jesse Donaldson's Land of Destiny (2020) was the first book-length treatment dedicated to Vancouver's real estate history.

=== Cannabis ===
British Columbia's cannabis industry was variously estimated at between $2 billion and $7 billion annually at its peak. Police estimated approximately 20,000 grow operations across British Columbia during peak years. National legalization came on October 17, 2018, with the Cannabis Act.

== Innovation and institutions ==
=== University spinoffs ===
The University of British Columbia (UBC) established its University–Industry Liaison Office in 1984. UBC researchers have formed more than 280 spinoff companies, generating an estimated $13 billion in sales and attracting over $4 billion in investment capital.

Key UBC spinoffs include AbCellera, STEMCELL Technologies (Canada's largest biotech company), and Acuitas Therapeutics (whose lipid nanoparticle technology enabled the Pfizer COVID-19 vaccine). D-Wave, founded in 1999 by UBC researchers, produced the first commercial quantum computer. Nobel laureate Michael Smith (1993, Chemistry) conducted foundational biotechnology work at UBC. TRIUMF, Canada's national particle accelerator laboratory located on the UBC campus, produces approximately two million patient doses of medical isotopes annually.

Simon Fraser University (SFU) has been ranked first in Canada for innovation by the World Universities with Real Impact (WURI) rankings for five consecutive years. Tableau Software co-founder Chris Stolte, an SFU alumnus, built the company that was acquired by Salesforce for $15.7 billion.

The Centre for Digital Media, a collaboration among UBC, SFU, BCIT, and Emily Carr University, received $40.5 million in provincial investment.

=== Innovation clusters ===
Vancouver hosts several concentrated industry clusters. The technology cluster includes eight geographic sub-clusters within the metropolitan core, with over 10,000 companies and 75,000 workers generating $23 billion in revenue. The film and VFX cluster comprises over 100 companies, supported by combined federal and provincial tax credits of approximately 58%. A mining finance cluster of 700–800 exploration companies in Greater Vancouver reflects the city's continuing role as a global centre for mineral exploration finance, with 1,200 mining companies listed on BC exchanges. The biotech cluster ranks seventh-largest in North America and is the fastest-growing in Canada.

The cleantech cluster includes Ballard Power Systems (incorporated in BC since 1979), whose founder Geoffrey Ballard was named Time magazine's "Hero for the Planet" in 1999. Ballard has invested more than $1.5 billion in R&D to advance hydrogen fuel cell technology. Carbon Engineering, a British Columbia-based company, was acquired for US$1.1 billion in 2023. A significant share of Canada's Global Cleantech 100 companies are based in British Columbia.

=== Key innovations from Vancouver ===
Notable innovations originating from the Vancouver area include: cosmetic Botox (1987, discovered by Drs. Jean and Alastair Carruthers); MDA (founded in a Vancouver basement in 1969, later acquiring the Canadarm robotics program); D-Wave quantum computing (1999); Ballard hydrogen fuel cells (first fuel cell bus, 1993); and Lululemon and the athleisure category (1998, founded by Chip Wilson)

== Economic cycles: booms and busts ==
Vancouver's economic history has been characterized by cycles of rapid expansion and contraction.

=== Booms ===
The CPR boom (1886–1890s) transformed the population from 400 to 14,000. The Klondike Gold Rush outfitting boom (1897–1899) stimulated Vancouver's retail and supply economy as prospectors purchased equipment en route to the Yukon, though Seattle captured the larger share of the outfitting trade.

The pre-World War I real estate boom (1900–1913) saw the city's population quadruple and its physical area expand from approximately two square miles to thirty square miles. Building permits rose from approximately $1 million in 1905 to $6 million in 1908 and peaked at $19 million in 1912. In 1912 alone, 2,224 houses, 217 factories, 293 offices, and 218 apartment buildings were constructed. Historian Norbert MacDonald described it as "a critical growth cycle": at the peak, there was one realtor for every 100 citizens, and half of city council were in the real estate business. Over 100 miles of streetcar lines, built after 1900, opened new areas to development. The B.C. Electric Railway, local government, and realtors colluded to use streetcar lines as a vehicle for real estate speculation; those with advance knowledge of planned line expansions made overnight fortunes. When a Wall Street financial crisis dried up foreign investment in mid-1913, building permits plummeted to below $1 million by 1915, and real estate prices fell by up to 90%.

The post-World War II industrial expansion built on wartime shipbuilding and the rise of suburban consumer demand. During the war, the Burrard Dry Dock built 109 cargo ships with approximately 14,000 workers. Postwar growth was fuelled by highways, hydroelectric dams, and new industries in electronics and aeronautics. Major western cities including Vancouver transitioned from service centres into significant metropolitan areas.

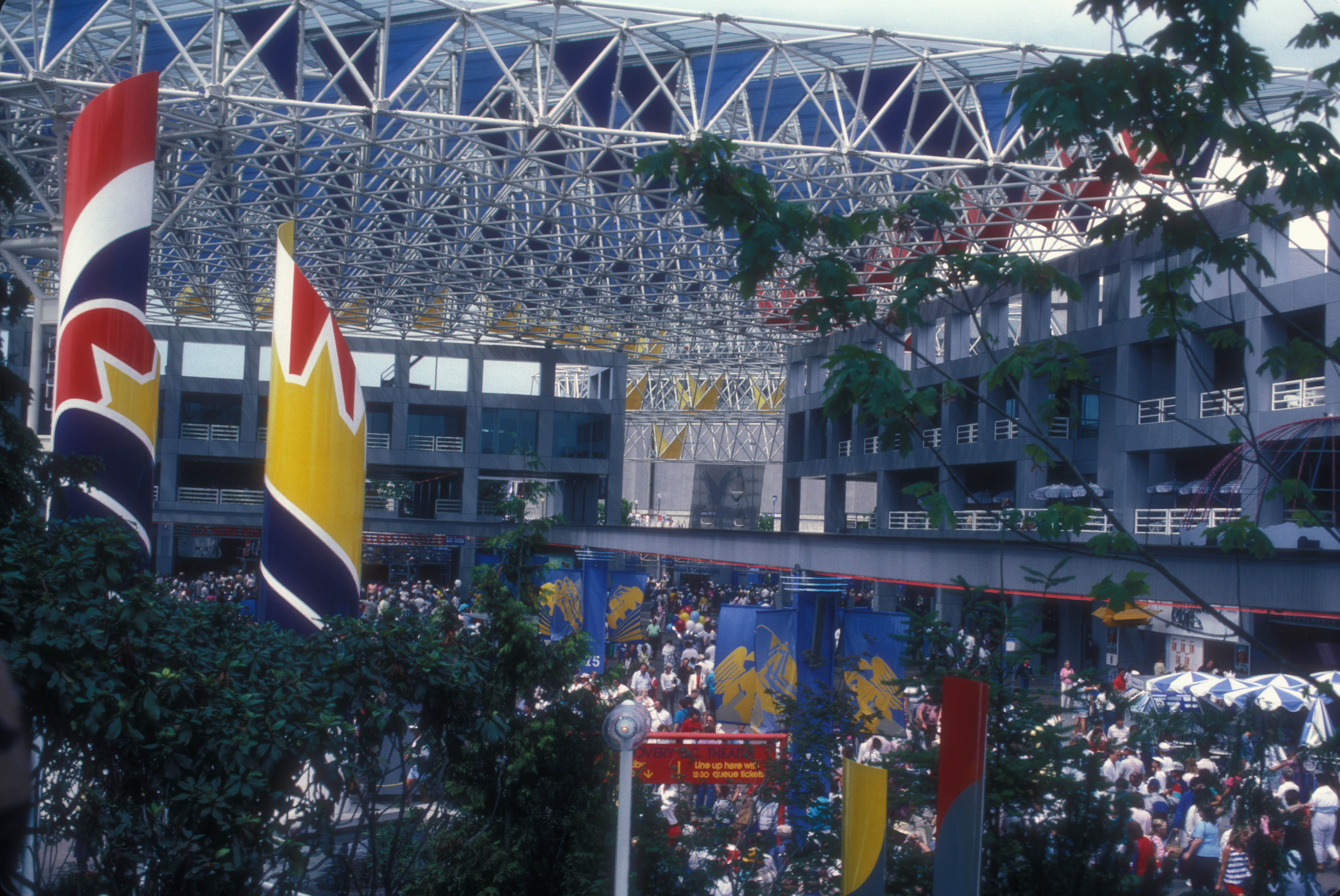
The British Columbia Pavilion at Expo 86, which drew over 22 million visitors

Expo 86 drew more than 22 million visitors and generated an estimated $3.7 billion for the Canadian economy. Despite a deficit of $311 million, it is widely viewed as the transition of Vancouver from a provincial resource-extraction city to one with global prominence. Infrastructure built for the fair included SkyTrain (opened 1985), BC Place (opened 1983), Canada Place, and the transformation of the False Creek waterfront from industrial land to high-density neighbourhoods. Jim Pattison served as chairman, president and CEO of the Expo 86 Corporation.

The Hong Kong capital influx (late 1980s–1990s) brought an estimated $15.3 billion in capital through investor immigration programs. The 2000s–2020s real estate boom saw a 28.2% single-year price surge between 2015 and 2016. The technology sector grew 69% in five years.

=== Busts and crises ===
The Great Vancouver Fire (1886) destroyed the city within weeks of its incorporation. The 1907 anti-Asian riots took place against a backdrop of recession and unemployment. On September 7, thousands marched through Vancouver's streets to a rally organized by the Asiatic Exclusion League, which had been formed by the Vancouver Trades and Labour Council amid the Panic of 1907. Mobs attacked businesses in Chinatown and Japantown, damaging dozens of Asian businesses—more than 50 in Japantown alone. The federal government subsequently compensated $26,000 to the Chinese-Canadian community and $9,000 to the Japanese-Canadian community.

The Great Depression struck British Columbia particularly hard. By 1931, the province's unemployment rate reached 31%, and the net value of production and exports fell by almost 60%. Products moving through BC's ports declined nearly 60%. Vancouver became known as the "mecca of the unemployed" because of its position at the end of the rail line and relatively mild winters, which attracted transient workers from across Canada.

The federal government established unemployment relief camps where single men performed physically demanding labour—splitting rock, building roads, and laying railway—for room and board and 20 cents per day. By the time the camps closed in June 1936, 170,248 men had lived and worked in them. In April 1935, 1,500 men from British Columbia camps went on strike, eventually setting forth on the On-to-Ottawa Trek to bring their demands to Parliament; the trek ended in violence during the Regina Riot of July 1, 1935. On June 18, 1935, the Battle of Ballantyne Pier saw approximately 1,000 striking longshoremen march toward Ballantyne Pier, where police used tear gas and mounted officers against them, hospitalizing 28 men.

The decline in the forestry sector reduced the industry from the economic backbone of the province to 5% of provincial employment by the 1990s. The collapse of the fishing industry saw Fraser River sockeye fall to historic lows by 2020. The VSE scandals resulted in five of every six investors losing money.

The crisis in housing affordability has had broad economic effects. Vancouver ranked as the fourth least affordable major market globally by 2025, with a median multiple of 11.8 and 106.4% of median income needed to cover home ownership costs. The crisis has contributed to a documented brain drain: British Columbia's Finance Minister acknowledged the phenomenon, and surveys have found that a majority of young professionals considered leaving the region due to housing costs. The Conference Board of Canada projected population decline in 2026 and 2027—the first since at least 1986.

The COVID-19 pandemic caused a significant GDP contraction in 2020. Tourism revenue fell by approximately 67%, and 132,000 jobs were lost in British Columbia in March 2020 alone.

== Future outlook ==
Major infrastructure projects include Roberts Bank Terminal 2, a new three-berth container terminal expected to increase Canada's west coast container capacity by more than 30% and contribute $3 billion in annual GDP when operational in the mid-2030s; the Broadway Subway extension, serving a corridor that generates $14 billion in GDP; the Surrey–Langley SkyTrain ($6 billion, expected 2029); and LNG Canada, which loaded its first cargo of liquefied natural gas on June 30, 2025, with an estimated $23 billion in government revenues over its 40-year export licence.

Emerging industries include artificial intelligence (over 500 companies in BC), cleantech, and life sciences (26.5% business growth between 2018 and 2021).

However, economists have identified structural challenges. The Business Council of British Columbia warned of an "economic plateau" following the completion of major capital projects, noting that GDP per capita fell in both 2023 and 2024. Housing affordability continues to drive brain drain, with the Conference Board of Canada projecting population declines. U.S. tariffs, particularly on softwood lumber, steel, and aluminum, pose significant risks to the export-dependent economy; Deloitte's 2026 outlook noted that British Columbia would struggle to withstand tariffs on its forestry sector.

British Columbia's share of goods exports to the United States has declined significantly since 2000, reflecting trade diversification toward Asian markets. The Port of Vancouver handles approximately $300 billion in annual trade, and its shipping advantage over Los Angeles and Long Beach positions it as one of North America's principal gateways to Asia.

Vancouver is scheduled to host seven 2026 FIFA World Cup matches, with FIFA's economic impact assessment estimating $1.7 billion in economic benefits for British Columbia.

== See also ==
- Economy of Vancouver
- History of Vancouver
- Port of Vancouver
- Vancouver Stock Exchange
- Economy of British Columbia
- Economic history of Canada
