= Ocean View Burial Park =

Canadian cemetery

- Interactive map of Ocean View Burial Park

Details
- Established: 1918
- Location: 4000 Imperial Street, Burnaby, British Columbia, Canada
- Find a Grave: Ocean View Burial Park

Ocean View Burial Park is a cemetery located in Burnaby, British Columbia. Established in 1918, it is currently operated by Service Corporation International Canada.

== History ==
Ocean View Burial Park was established in 1918 and opened for burials in 1919. It was created as British Columbia's first non-sectarian cemetery. The cemetery contains Abbey Mausoleum, which was designed 1928 by Wallace H. Hubbert. The mausoleum was further expanded in 1946–47, and again in 1954–55 in order to modernize the building.

Until the 1970s, Ocean View Burial Park was racially segregated. in 1929, the "Willow" section of the cemetery was designated for any person of color. A mausoleum was later built specifically for the Chinese community.

== Notable occupants ==
- Kathleen Rockwell - American Vaudeville dancer.
- Won Alexander Cumyow - Canadian public servant and first person of Chinese descent known to have been born in Canada.
