= Japantown, Vancouver =

Neighbourhood in British Columbia, Canada

Coordinates: 49.28312°N 123.09530°W

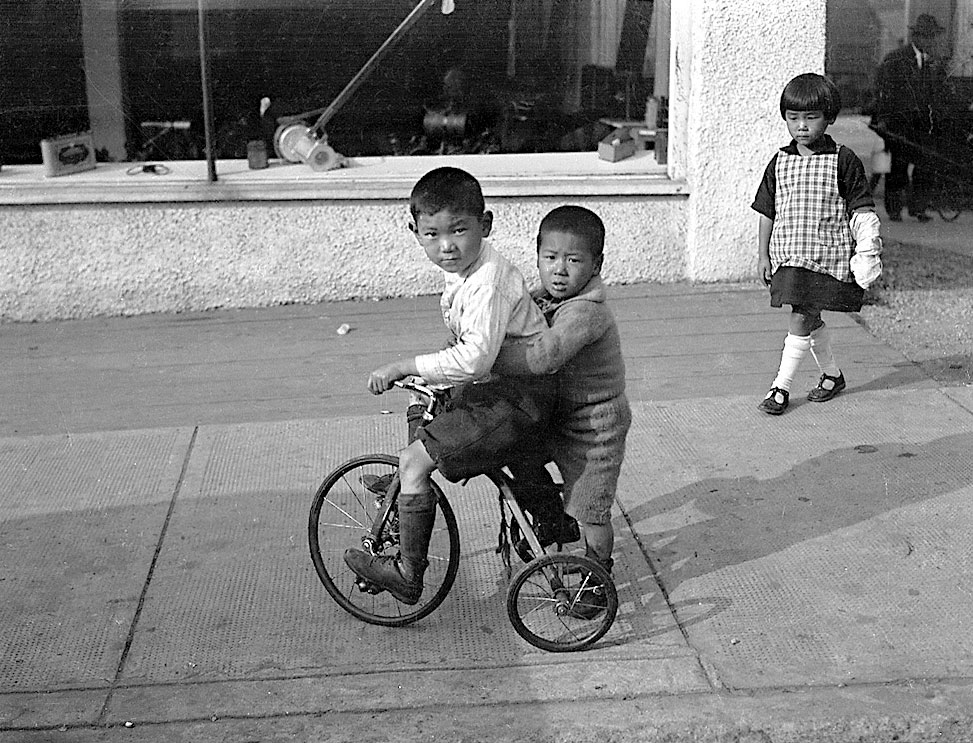
Kids at play in 1927

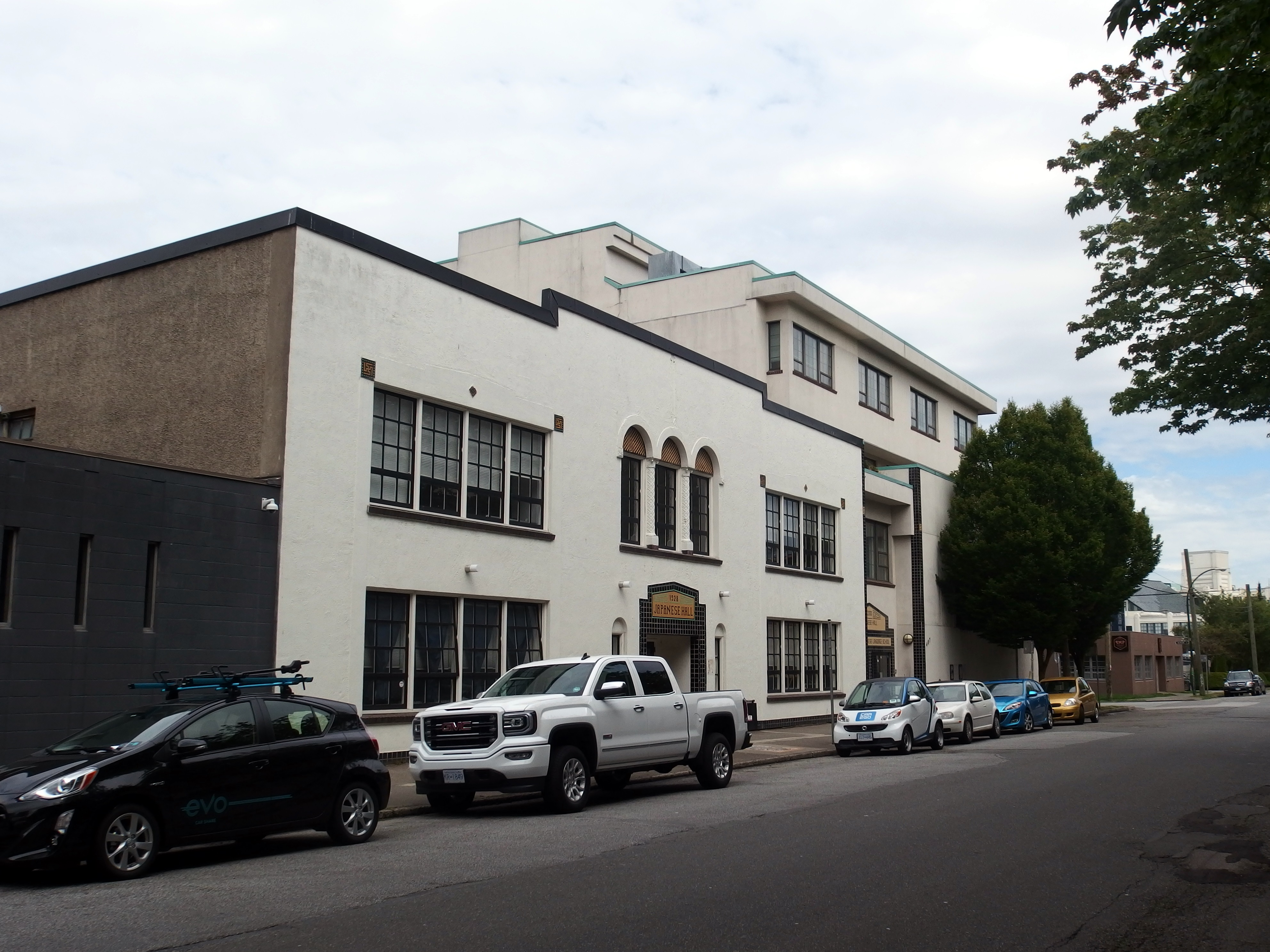
Vancouver Japanese Language School on Alexander Street is the only property in Canada where the ownership has been returned to the Japanese Canadian community after the internment.

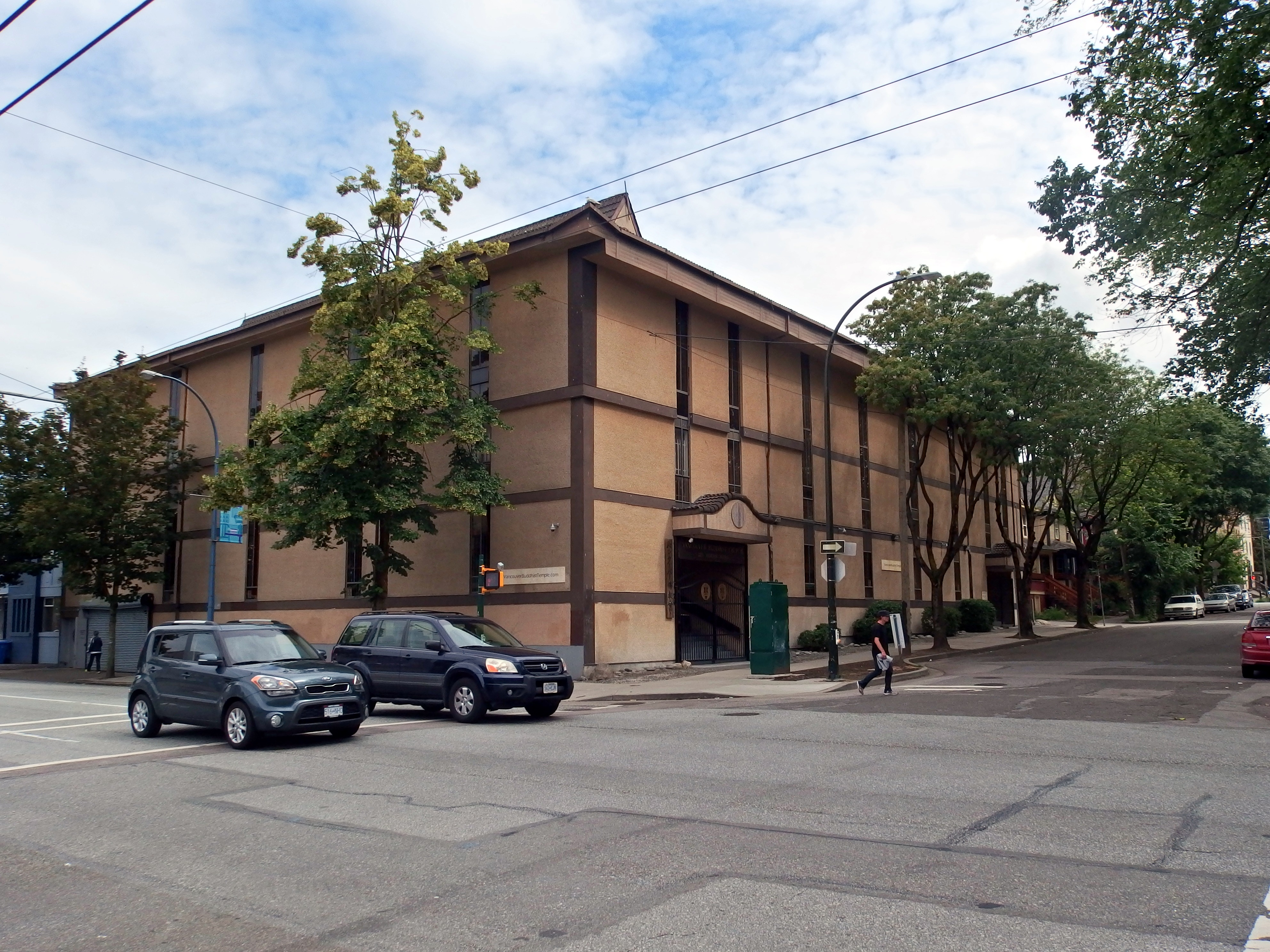
Vancouver Buddhist Temple on Powell Street & Jackson Avenue

Japantown, Little Tokyo or Paueru-gai (パウエル街; lit. "Powell Street") is an old neighbourhood in Vancouver, British Columbia, Canada, located east of Gastown and north of Chinatown, that once had a concentration of Japanese immigrants.

Japantown ceased to be a distinct Japanese ethnic area during World War II when Japanese Canadians had their property confiscated and were interned. Although some Japanese returned after the war, the community never revived to its original state as the properties of Japanese Canadians were permanently forfeited by the Canadian government. As Japantown ceased to exist, the area is often referred to and marketed as Railtown by real estate developers.

== History ==
Japantown was attacked on 7 September 1907 by the Asiatic Exclusion League during the 1907 Vancouver anti-Asian riots, which smashed many windows in parts of Chinatown, and then moved on to Japantown. Four waves of attacks ensued, with the mob repulsed by armed Japantown residents who had received warning of the attacks in Chinatown. In spite of injuries inflicted by the residents, the rioters smashed the windows of more than 50 stores and businesses on Powell Street, causing thousands of dollars of damage. The centenary of the attacks was marked by a Riot Walk through Chinatown and Japantown on 7 September 2007.

Prior to World War II, in addition to having many restaurants, hotels and businesses, the district was home to three Japanese daily papers (Tiriku Nippo, Canada Shimbun, and Minshu), three Buddhist churches, several sentō (Chitose, Tokiwa, Kotobuki, and Matsunoyu), and a Japanese language school with as many as one thousand students. By 1921, the number of Japanese stores and businesses on the street had reached 578. The kenjinkai (prefecture association) organized mutual aid for the community, mitigating the need for welfare during the Great Depression.

During World War II, Japanese Canadians had their property confiscated and were sent to internment camps and prisoner of war camps, and Japantown ceased to be a distinct Japanese ethnic area. Although some Japanese returned to the area after the war, the community never revived as the properties confiscated by the Canadian government were never returned. The area is now part of Strathcona in the Downtown Eastside and the area is informally known as Railtown.

Along Powell Street, a few remnants of the former Japanese neighbourhood still exist. The Vancouver Buddhist Church, formerly the Japanese Methodist Church, still exists at 220 Jackson Avenue at Powell, as does the Vancouver Japanese Language School and Japanese Hall at 475 and 487 Alexander Street at Jackson, which is the only property in Canada that was ever returned to Japanese Canadians after World War II. Until the boom in Japanese restaurants in the 1980s, two restaurants on Powell Street were among the only Japanese dining establishments in the city.

== Oppenheimer Park ==
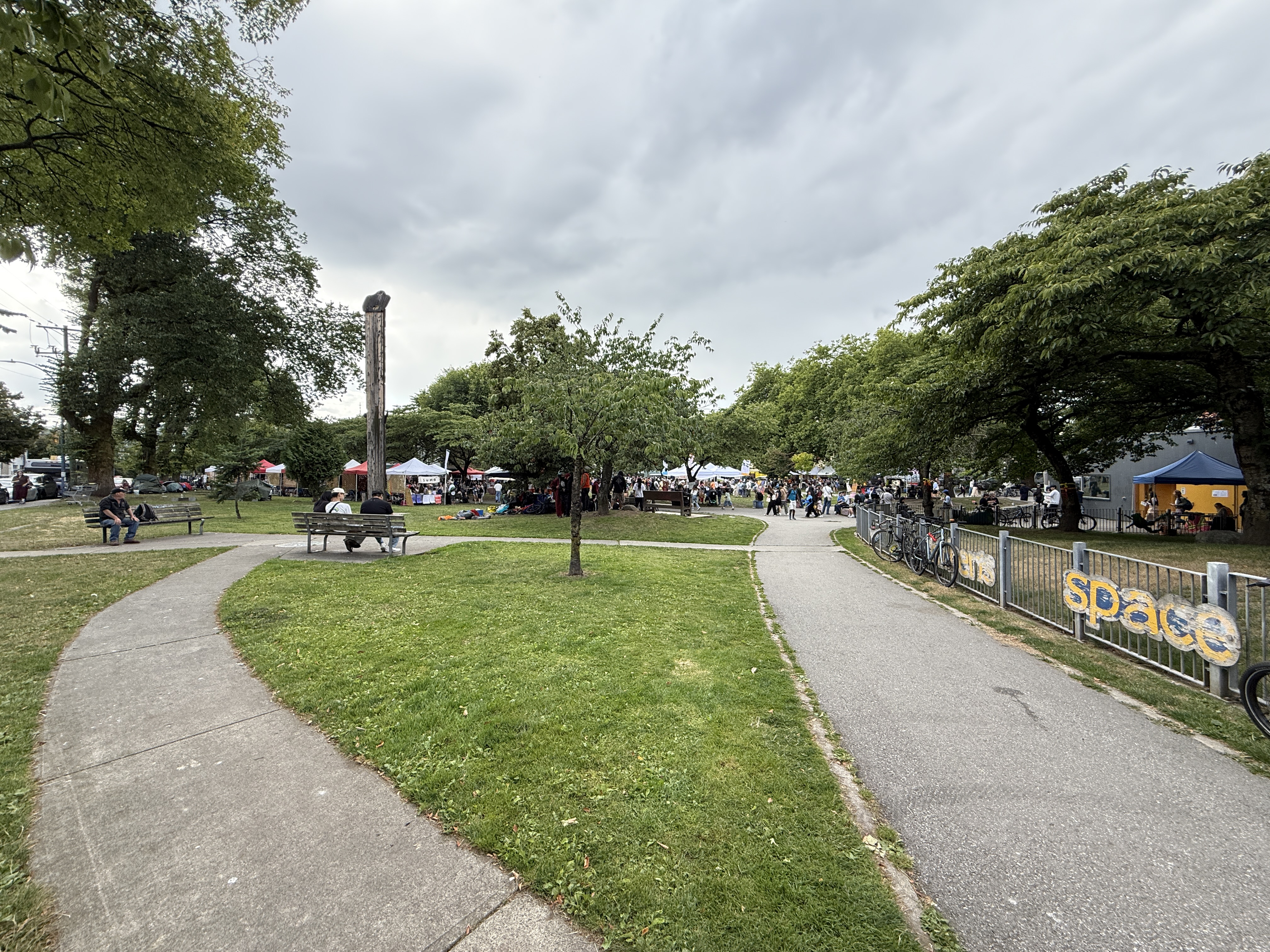
Oppenheimer Park in 2026

Oppenheimer Park (Powell Street Grounds) in this area was the home for Asahi baseball team and it is the site for the annual two-day Powell Street Festival, which began in 1977. It is held every August, in the first weekend of the month, and is a community celebration of Japanese heritage as well as the alternative and street culture of the Downtown Eastside.

== See also ==
- Economic history of Vancouver
- Asahi (baseball team)
- Judo in British Columbia
- Judo in Canada
