= Benjamin Tingley Rogers =

American businessman

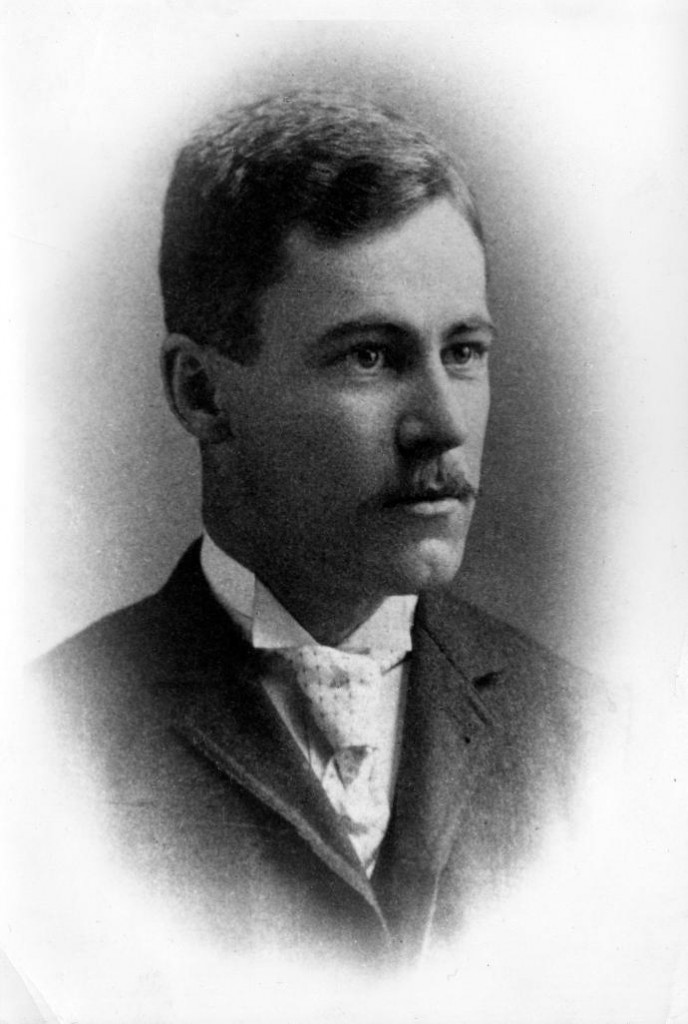
- Benjamin Tingley Rogers in 1890
- Born: October 21, 1865; Philadelphia, Pennsylvania
- Died: June 17, 1918 (aged 52); Vancouver, British Columbia, Canada
- Occupation: Businessman
- Known for: Founding the British Columbia Sugar Refining Company

Benjamin Tingley Rogers (October 21, 1865 – June 17, 1918) was an American businessman who was the founder of British Columbia Sugar in Vancouver, British Columbia, Canada.

== Early years ==
Benjamin Tingley Rogers was born in Philadelphia, Pennsylvania, following the American Civil War. His father, Samuel Blythe Rogers was the head of a sugar refinery in Philadelphia. His mother was Clara Augusta Dupuy. In 1869 Benjamin's father, together with his brother-in-law, Senator Henry Sanford, purchased a sugar plantation in Louisiana and built a sugar refinery in New Orleans, staffed by “newly freed slaves.”

Benjamin followed in his father's footsteps into the sugar industry, studying sugar chemistry Standard Refinery Company in Boston after attending the elite Phillips Academy in Andover, Massachusetts.

His father died in 1883, prompting his family to move to Brooklyn in New York City from New Orleans. Benjamin joined the Havemeyers and Elder refinery, considered at the time the most modern sugar plant in the United States. After staying with the company for four years Rogers had mastered the difficult process of sugar boiling.

== Goes to Montreal ==
Rogers wanted to start his own company. In 1889, while he was in Montreal installing a new filtering system at the Canada Sugar Refinery owned by George Alexander Drummond, he learned much about the opportunities available in western Canada, specifically in Vancouver. Vancouver was the last stop of the Canadian Pacific Railway on the west coast, and he believed the city could be a center of development in Western Canada with an as yet untapped market for processed sugar. He quickly wrote a proposal to build a refinery in the budding city.

"The Montreal refineries, owing to the peculiar tariff laws of Canada, draw their supply of raw sugar from the cheapest and most distant market, largely from Manila," Rogers continued. "I herewith submit preliminary plans and estimates for a house to melt 40,000 lbs. per day, and requiring a working force of between 12 and 15 men. I would propose also to compete eventually with the eastern refiners as far as Winnipeg and as much further as the freight rates would permit."

His idea to open a sugar refinery in Vancouver was met with overwhelming support. Businessmen in New York, encouraged by the Havemeyers, bought shares in Rogers’ nascent company. Their reputations also lent important legitimacy to the venture. Sugar barrel manufacturer Lowell M. Palmer arranged for Rogers to meet William Cornelius Van Horne, who was the president of the Canadian Pacific Railway. Van Horne was happy to do whatever it took to encourage development at the western terminus of his railway line, so he strongly supported Rogers’ plan. Along with several of his fellow directors of the CPR, including Richard Bladworth Angus, Sir Donald Alexander Smith, Edmund Boyd Osler, and Wilmot Deloui Matthews, Van Horne purchased shares in Rogers’ sugar refinery, which became known as the British Columbia Sugar Refining Company.

== The British Columbia Sugar Refining Company ==
Rogers opened the BC refinery in 1890, only four years after the founding of the City of Vancouver. Initial orders of sugar cane was imported through ocean going vessels from the European colonies in the East Indies, including the Philippines and island of Java.

In letter written by Rogers to Vancouver Mayor David Oppenheimer and the city council, dated January 27, 1890, Rogers proposes to build a sugar refinery “constructed of brick in the most substantial manner” in just eight months. Rogers requested from the city council a grant of $40,000 and rights to water for 15 years, at no charge. The council agreed all of Rogers’ requests, including the payment of $15,525 for the site of the refinery, but they offered him a grant of only $30,000. Also stipulated in the agreement was the requirement by the city that Rogers not hire any Chinese workers.

Since the Asian workers were paid less than the white workers, the city believed businesses would show preferential hiring to the Chinese, thus defeating some of the purpose of bringing the business into the city. A hidden poster uncovered from within the walls of the building, dating to 1895 stated "Chinese Industry, Coolie Labor or Home Industry, White Labour," it read. "Use only sugars refined in our own country." The illustration on the poster was of a Chinese worker lifting sugar for 10 cents a day, and a white worker pushing a wheelbarrow hauling barrels of sugar labeled BC Sugar working for two dollars per day. Rogers agreed not to hire Chinese labor. Raw sugar was imported over sea from Australia, Asia and Central America.

== Success ==
BC Sugar was highly successful. In 1910, the trademark B.C. Sugar Refinery—Rogers was registered. Beginning 1913, part of its success was the popularity of Rogers' Golden Syrup using the by-product of the refining process of cane. It was developed by chemist Robert Boyd. Rogers became a wealthy man from the enterprise, building two mansions which are landmarks today; Gabriola on Davie Street, and Shannon on Granville.

== Personal life ==
On June 1, 1892, Rogers married Mary Isabella Angus in Victoria, British Columbia. Angus was born in 1869 and married Rogers after migrating from England to Canada in July, 1885 with her parents. The couple had four sons, who all succeeded Benjamin as presidents of the company after his death, as well as three daughters. One grandson also was president.

== Death ==
B.T. Rogers died of cerebral hemorrhage in his Vancouver mansion on June 17, 1918. He was 52 years old.

== See also ==
- Economic History of Vancouver
