= Mount Onderdonk =

Mountain in British Columbia, Canada

- Location within British Columbia Location within Canada
- Interactive map of Mount Onderdonk

Highest point
- Elevation: 2,685 m (8,809 ft)
- Prominence: 555 m (1,821 ft)
- Parent peak: Remillard Peak (2881 m)
- Listing: Mountains of British Columbia
- Coordinates: 51°45′39″N 118°07′57″W

Geography
- Location: British Columbia, Canada
- District: Kootenay Land District
- Parent range: Selkirk Mountains
- Topo map: NTS 82M16 Argonaut Mountain

Mount Onderdonk is a mountain in British Columbia named for Andrew Onderdonk. It is located in the northern Selkirk Mountains between lower Revelstoke Lake and the Wood Arm of Kinbasket Lake. The mountain is 280 miles from Vancouver, 1861 miles from Toronto and 2047 miles from Montreal. Andrew Onderdonk was a Dutch-American engineer who worked in the late 1800s building the Canadian Pacific Railway in British Columbia and in other locations. William Lowell Putnam and Roger W. Laurilla gave the mountain this name as a tribute to Onderdonk.
