= Andrew Onderdonk =

American construction contractor

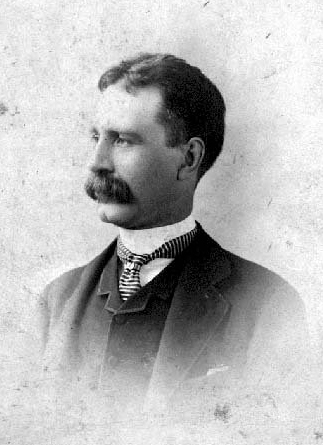
- Andrew Onderdonk circa 1880
- Born: 30 August 1848; New York City
- Died: 21 June 1905 (56); Oscawana-on-the Hudson, New York
- Occupation: Construction contractor
- Known for: Mount Onderdonk in British Columbia was named for him

Andrew Onderdonk (30 August 1848 – 21 June 1905) was an American construction contractor who worked on several major projects in the West, including the San Francisco seawall in California and the Canadian Pacific Railway in British Columbia. He was born in New York City to an established ethnic Dutch family. He received his education at the Rensselaer Polytechnic Institute.

He married Sarah Delia Hilman of Plainfield, New Jersey. After starting his career surveying town sites and roads in New Jersey, he headed west to work as a general manager for financier Darius Ogden Mills on several engineering contracts. He died in Oscawana-on-the Hudson, New York, on June 21, 1905.

== San Francisco ==
His first major project was the San Francisco seawall. This project took three years and involved constructing ferry slips and seawalls for the San Francisco Harbor. His son Andrew Jr. was born in San Francisco.

== Canadian Pacific Railway ==
In 1879, Onderdonk won a series of contracts to build the western section of what is now the Canadian Pacific Railway. Working directly for the Canadian government, he built the 227 mile (365 km) section from Port Moody, 11 miles east of Vancouver and tidewater at the coast, northeastward to Savona (near Kamloops). When those sections were complete, he continued building eastward under contract with the Canadian Pacific Railway, until he ran out of rail in Eagle Pass in 1885.

Onderdonk and his wife moved to Yale, British Columbia, so that he could supervise the construction. Yale was the head of navigation for steamships on the Fraser River and very near the starting point at Emory's Bar for his first contract. It was not until 1882 that the contract was let for the section between Yale and Port Moody.

=== Chinese workers ===
One of the more controversial aspects of Onderdonk's work in British Columbia was his use of Chinese workers as labourers. From Emory's Bar to Savona, the railway had to be built through the Fraser Canyon, whose immense cliffs required extensive and expensive tunnelling. He got permission from the Canadian government to import Chinese workers from both California and China. This solution was opposed both by the Anglo-European white population in British Columbia and the new province's government, which wanted to attract British railway workers as settler-colonists. The Canadian government wanted to save money by hiring workers at lower costs than would be possible with British workers. The white population feared wage decreases and job loss because of competition with the Chinese, as employers took advantage of their immigrant status and lack of language skills by paying them lower wages.

Onderdonk told the Canadian government that if he could not use Chinese workers, the railway could not be built. The people and government of British Columbia were forced to accept the Canadian government's method of keeping costs down in order to get the railway built to complete a major transportation route through the mountains and to eastern markets.

Historians estimate Onderdonk arranged to bring in six and a half thousand Chinese from China and many more thousand from California. The Chinese workers were assigned to crews separate from the white workers and often given the most dangerous jobs, including the tunnel blasting, using the highly unstable nitroglycerin explosive. Many Chinese were killed in accidents or died of scurvy during the winter. Scurvy fatalities, due to a vitamin deficiency in the diet, were high because of the workers' dietary reliance on rice. They were given rice mats as part of their pay system, and the workers had little cash to buy supplements for their food. They owed debts to the Chinese labour contractors who had sold their services to Onderdonk. Unlike the white workers, injured Chinese workers were not provided access to the company hospital. They were left to the aid of their fellow workers. At the end of construction, the Chinese labour contracting companies abandoned their charges; thousands of workers were left stranded and living in caves without food and water in the desert heat of the mountains surrounding Spences Bridge. They were not able to leave the area until white charities in Vancouver sponsored tickets for their transport back to China or California.

Discrimination and racism led to occasional fights between the Chinese workers and the white workers. A white foreman was murdered by a mob of Chinese workers at Camp 23 near Lytton after three Chinese workers were fired. Generally management considered the Chinese to be efficient, hard-working and well-behaved workers, although many thousands deserted to the goldfields rather than stay in the harsh conditions of the railway camps.

=== Canadian Pacific contracts ===
When Onderdonk finished the five government contracts, he undertook contracts directly with the Canadian Pacific Railway to build eastward to meet the track being built from Eastern Canada and then ended at Golden, BC. Unlike the section in the Fraser Canyon, the section east of Savona was much easier to build. The route followed the south shore of Kamloops Lake, through the city of Kamloops, then along the South Thompson River, Little Shuswap Lake, the Little River to Shuswap Lake. The line generally follows the shore of Shuswap Lake except for a short cut through Notch Hill.

Leaving the lake at Sicamous (in Onderdonk's day called Eagle Pass Landing), the line goes up the Eagle River towards Eagle Pass. Navigable waters along this entire section of the route enabled supply of construction materials by the steamboats that traveled the Thompson and Shuswap rivers. In the summer of 1885, Onderdonk's workers ran out of rail at a location that was later called Craigellachie. The railway construction from the east reached that point in November and the last spike was hammered home on November 7, 1885.

== Other work ==
After his work for the Canadian Pacific Railway, Onderdonk was successful in gaining more contracts for railway and canal construction, mostly in eastern Canada and the United States. In 1895, Onderdonk obtained a contract from the Canadian government to build sections of the Trent-Severn Waterway in Ontario. In 1899, he tendered a bid for constructing the initial portion of the New York City Subway, but was rejected in favor of John Bart McDonald. He won the bid to remove the rock and dirt from the tunnel beneath the Hudson River and used the debris to expand Governor's Island.

== Legacy ==
- Mount Onderdonk in British Columbia was named for him; it is located in the northern Selkirk Mountains, near the head of the Goldstream River, roughly between lower Revelstoke Lake and the Wood Arm of Kinbasket Lake.
- A station on the Canadian Pacific Railway has a sign "Onderdonk," located at MP 107.5 (Pitt Meadows BC), Cascade Subdivision CPR.

== See also ==
- Canadian Pacific Railway
- Canadian Pacific Survey
- History of British Columbia
- History of Chinese immigration to Canada
- Economic History of Vancouver
