= Centerm =

Dock in Vancouver

Coordinates: 49.287°N 123.089°W

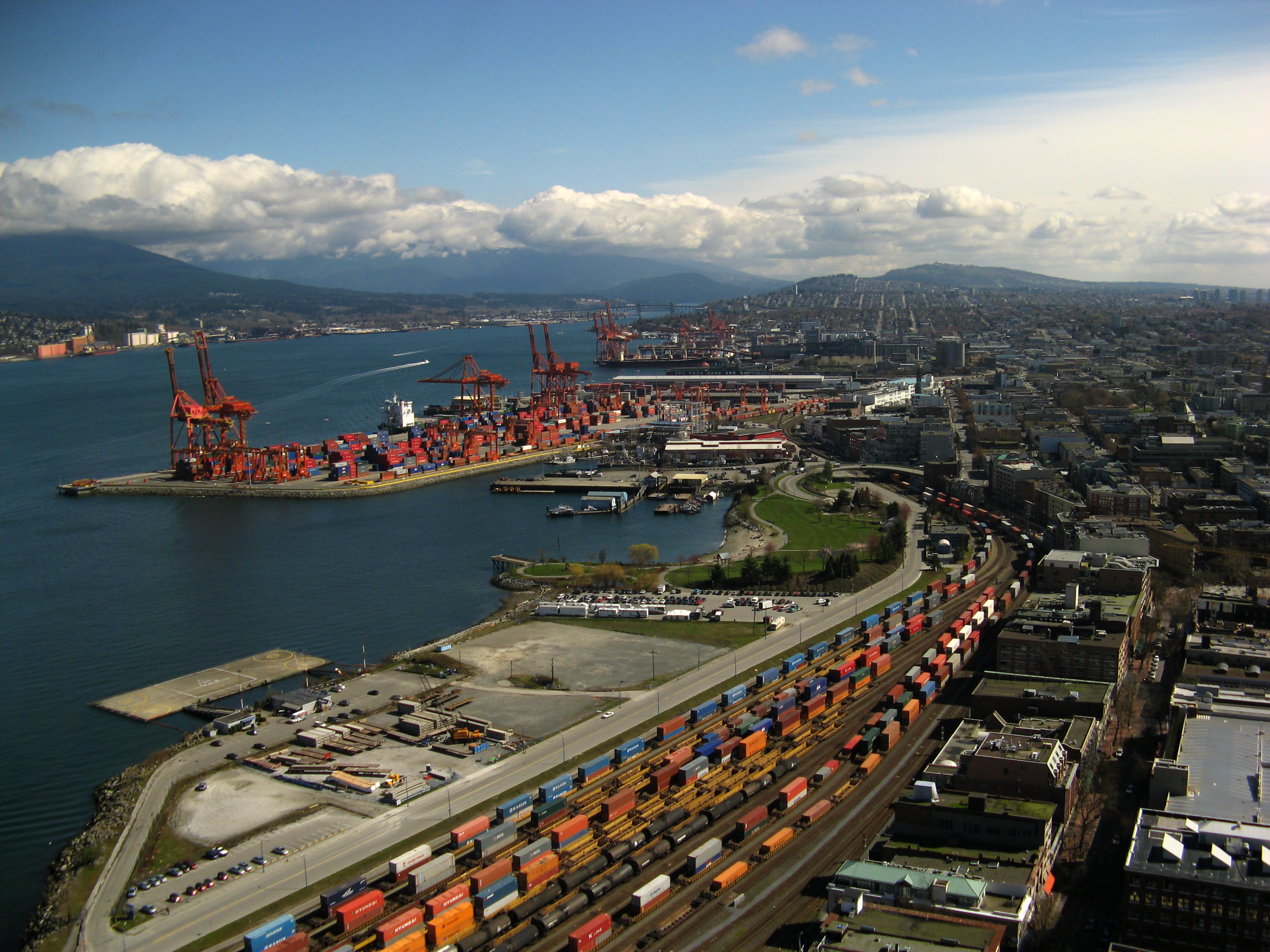

Centerm is short for Centennial Terminals, a major container port in Vancouver, British Columbia, Canada. It is located on the south shore of the Burrard Inlet in Vancouver's Downtown Eastside neighbourhood. It is one of four container terminals at the Port of Vancouver, the others being Vanterm, Deltaport, and Fraser Surrey Docks. The terminal has two berths with a total length of 647 metres and depth of 15.5 metres, seven ship-to-shore cranes, and is directly served by both Canadian Class 1 Railways, CN and CPKC. ILWU Local 500 and 514 make up the majority of the labour force

== History ==
Building rubble was dumped on the foreshore at Main Street and a peninsula where the Hastings Mill once sat and a massive terminal was created at the behest of Barney Johnson with Federal money in 1958, hence the Centennial Year and name (British Columbia's 100's birthday). Centerm was operated by Canadian Stevedoring and subsidiary Casco Terminals for much of its history. It experienced a series of acquisitions beginning in the 1990s, and has been operated by DP World Canada, a subsidiary of the Dubai based DP World since 2006.

A $350 million expansion project completed in Spring 2023 added 15% to the terminal footprint and increased its annual throughout capacity from 900,000 to 1.5 million TEUs.
