= Vanterm =

Container terminal in Vancouver,

Coordinates: 49.287°N 123.074°W

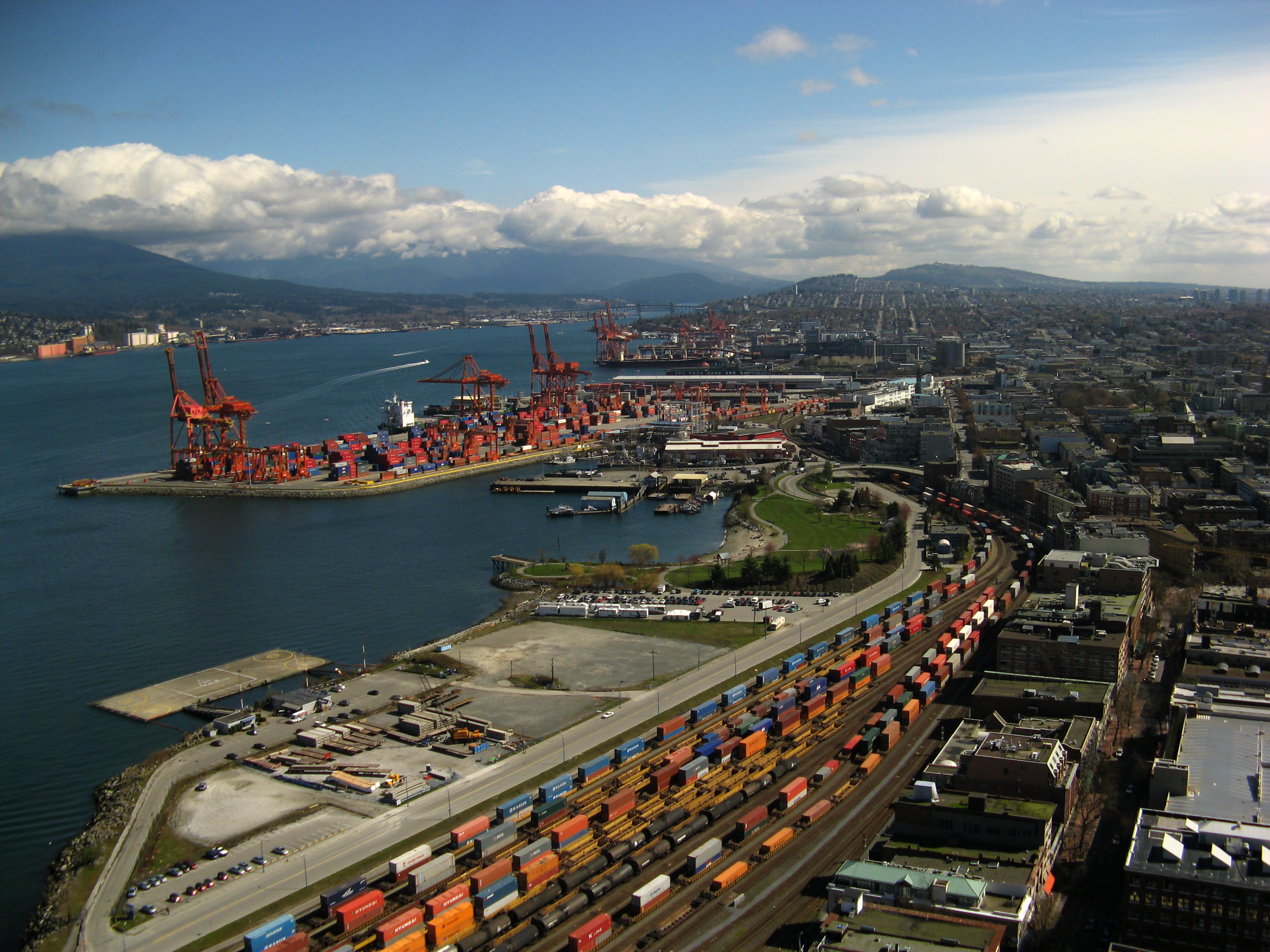
Port of Vancouver with Centerm in the foreground and Vanterm in the background

Vanterm is a container terminal in Vancouver, British Columbia, Canada. It is located on the south shore of the Burrard Inlet in Vancouver's East Side. It is operated by GCT Canada, a Vancouver-based company which also operates Deltaport another container terminal at the Port of Vancouver. Vanterm has a 619-metre (2,030 ft) berth with a depth of 15.5 metres, six ship-to-shore cranes, and is directly served by both Canadian Class 1 Railways, CN and CPKC. ILWU Local 500 and 514 make up the majority of the labour force.

== History ==
LaPointe Pier, now only a small part of the modern terminal, had its first container ship, the M.S. Axel Johnson, call its berth in 1969. Vanterm was inaugurated as a container terminal in 1975 and run by Empire Stevedoring and later TSI Terminal Systems Inc. which rebranded to GCT Global Container Terminals.

A $160 million investment in 2019 upgraded terminal infrastructure, software, and equipment, including the acquisition of two modern ship-to-shore cranes, ten rubber tired gantry cranes, and 19 empty container handlers to increase its annual throughout capacity from 835,000 to 1 million TEUs.

On January 28, 2019, the vessel Ever Summit struck the dock while berthing, causing damage to the vessel, berth, and a gantry crane. There were no injuries.

== See also ==
- Centerm
