= Deas Island =

Peninsula in British Columbia, Canada

Coordinates: 49.121°N 123.065°W

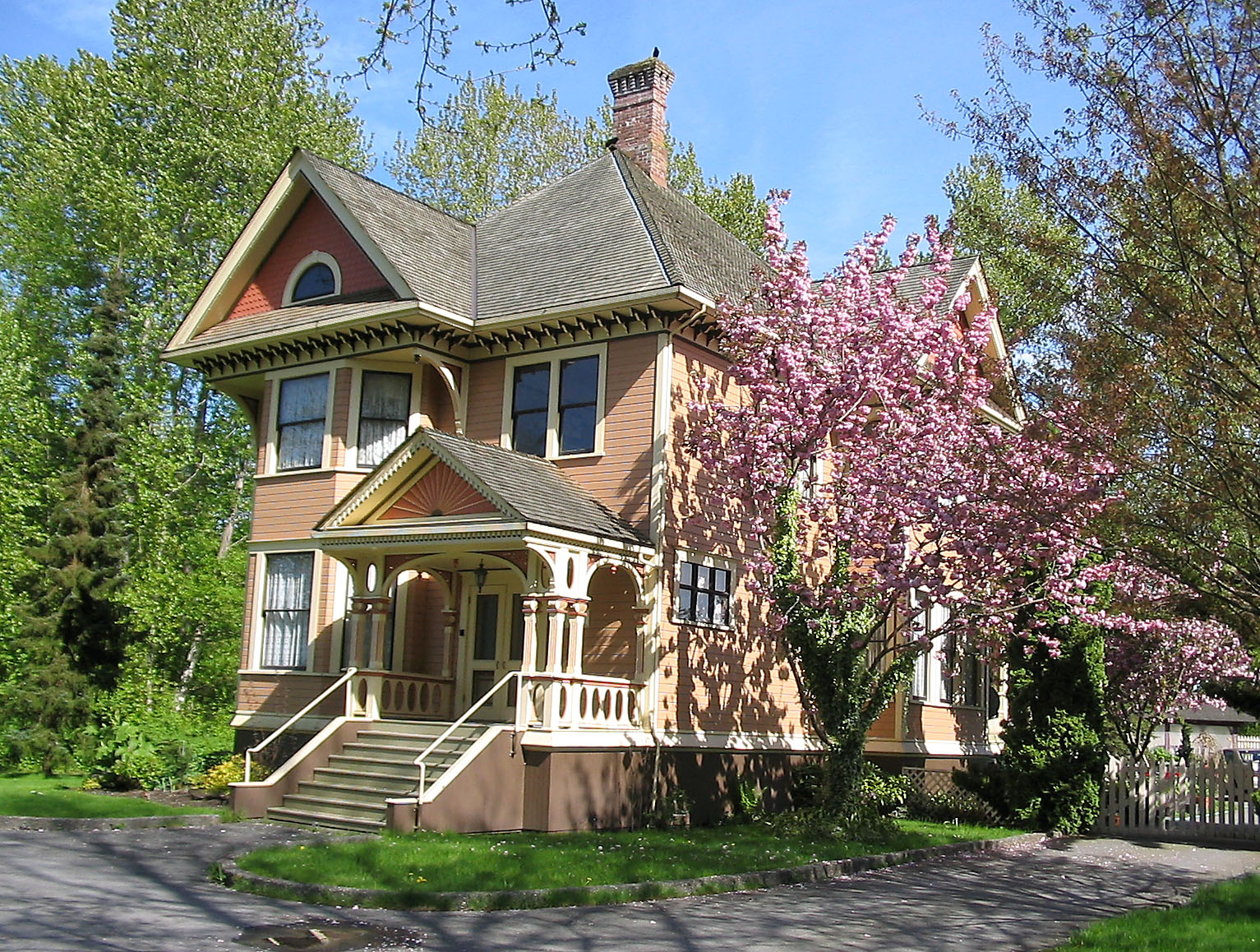
Burrvilla

Deas Island is a peninsula in the south arm of the Fraser River between Delta, British Columbia and Richmond, British Columbia, Canada. It is home to a regional park approximately 300 acres (120 ha) in size; and has three historic buildings: Burrvilla, a stately Victorian home; Inverholme, a one-room schoolhouse; and the Delta Agricultural Hall. Between 1895 and the 1940s, the peninsula had a small Greek settlement with a population of about 80 at its peak.

It is a habitat for many kinds of birds, and a popular bird-watching destination.

The peninsula is notable as the site of the southern end of the George Massey Tunnel (originally the Deas Island Tunnel), which is part of Highway 99 and connects Delta to Richmond. The tunnel goes from Deas Island to Lulu Island (Richmond) to the north. A small bridge completes the connection between Deas Island and the main part of Delta.

A portion of Deas Island is occupied by Deas Island Regional Park.

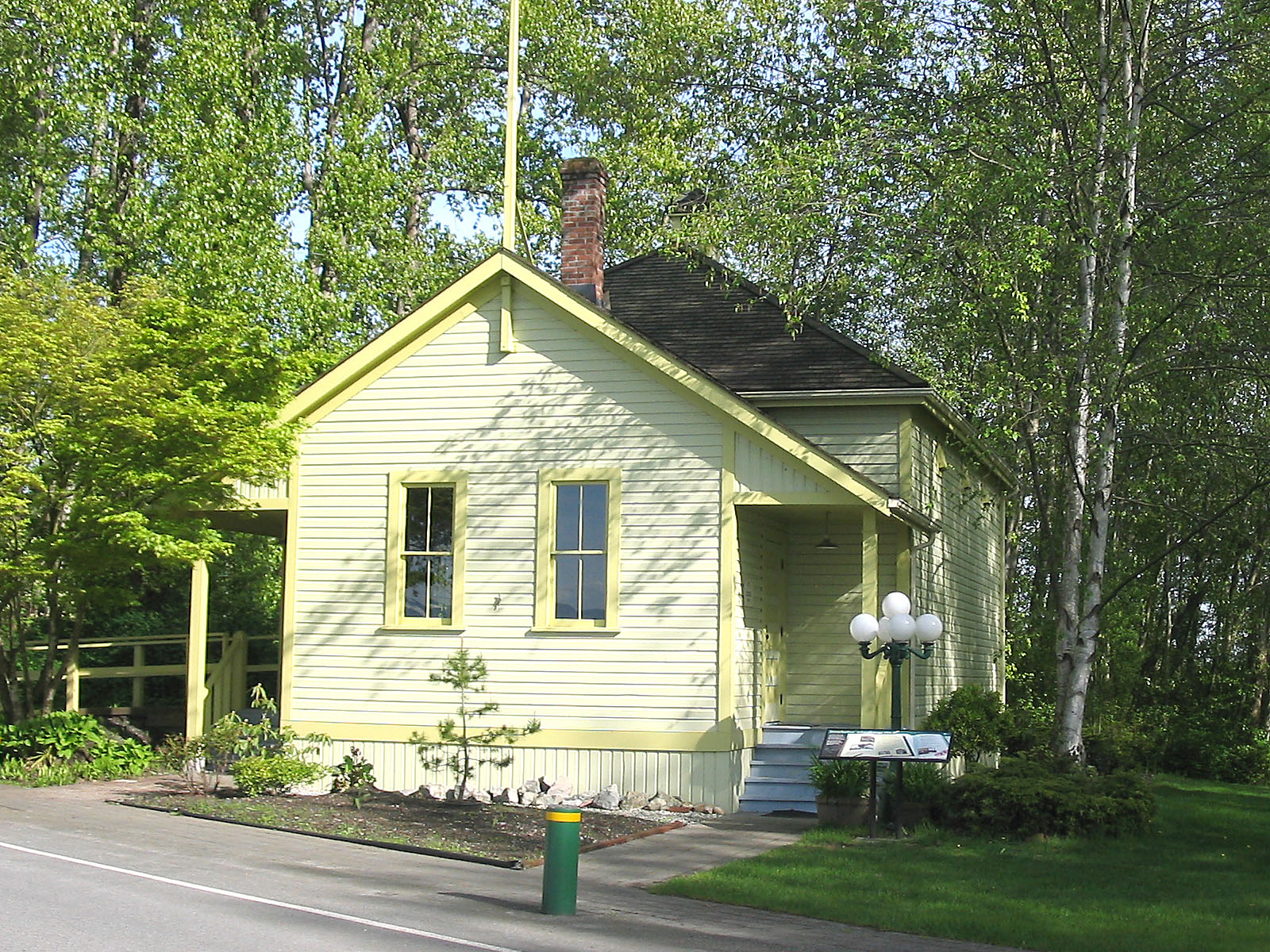
The 1909 Inverholme schoolhouse

== Origin of the name ==
The peninsula was named for John Sullivan Deas, an African-Canadian tinsmith who established a cannery on the peninsula in 1873. His was the leading cannery on the Fraser River until 1878, at which point growing competition encouraged Deas to sell.
