= Won Alexander Cumyow =

Canadian public servant

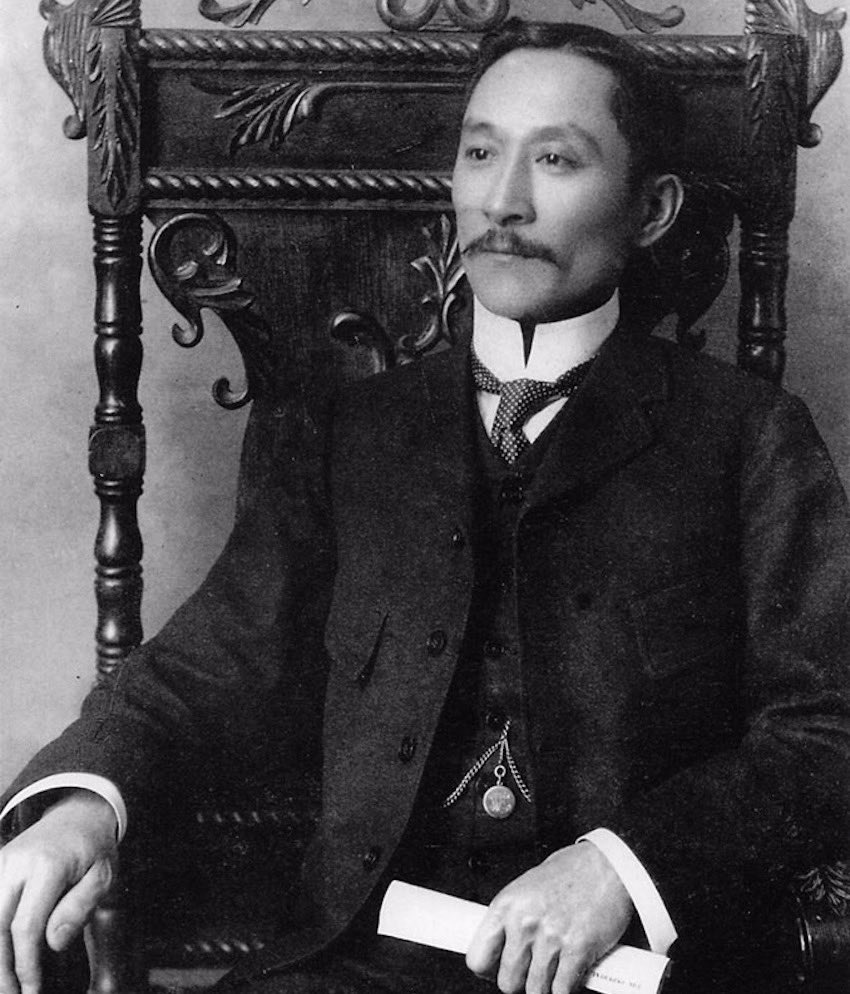
- Won Cumyow as a young man
- Born: Won Cumyow; March 24, 1861; Port Douglas, Colony of British Columbia
- Died: October 6, 1955 (aged 94); Vancouver, British Columbia, Canada

Chinese name
- Traditional Chinese: 溫金有
- Simplified Chinese: 温金有
Transcriptions
Standard Mandarin
- Hanyu Pinyin: Wēn Jīnyǒu
- Wade–Giles: Wen Chin-yu
Hakka
- Romanization: Vun^{1} Gim^{1} Yu^{1}
- Pha̍k-fa-sṳ: Vûn Kîm Yû
Yue: Cantonese
- Yale Romanization: Wān Gām Yáuh
- Jyutping: Wan^{1} Gam^{1} Jau^{5}

Won Alexander Cumyow (Chinese: 溫金有) was an early Chinese Canadian public servant and community leader.

== Early life ==
Born on about 1861 March 24 in Port Douglas (at the north end of Harrison Lake, Colony of British Columbia at the start of the Douglas Road to Lillooet during the Fraser Canyon Gold Rush), Won Cumyow was the oldest son of Won Ling Sing, a Hakka-speaking store and restaurant owner who had emigrated in 1858 from China to San Francisco and later to Port Douglas. Won Cumyow was the first person of Chinese descent known to have been born within the boundaries of present-day Canada (British Columbia being a colony in 1861).

He attended high school in New Westminster and became a court interpreter (1888) and labour contractor. He was an interpreter in the Vancouver police court from 1904 to 1936, speaking English, Cantonese, Hakka, and also the Chinook Jargon, which he had learned as a child at Port Douglas. He studied law, even articled, but was not permitted a license because, being Chinese, he was denied the vote.

Won Cumyow voted for the first time in 1890 but provincial legislation in 1895–1896 stripped Chinese (as well as Japanese and First Nations) voting rights in elections in BC (though his name still does appear on the 1898 BC voters list). The voters' list in federal elections came from the provincial election's voters' list, and so the federal franchise was also blocked. The federal Chinese Immigration Act of 1923 also known as the Chinese Exclusion Act, was repealed after World War II on 1947 May 14, and he then voted again in the next federal election in 1949—making him the only Chinese person to have voted both before and after the disenfranchisement. A photo of him voting has been reprinted in newspapers many times, and is featured on a wall mural in Vancouver's Chinatown.

== Community work ==
Active in the Vancouver's Chinese community, he was founder of the Chinese Empire Reform Association (an organization of overseas Chinese, active mostly between 1899 and 1911, made up of mostly the older, more prosperous Chinese merchants in Canada, and supporting the modernization of China through progressive reforms within the framework of a constitutional monarchy rather than by armed revolution), and a president of the Chinese Benevolent Association. Chinese merchants had formed the Chinese Consolidated Benevolent Association, with the first branch in Victoria in 1884 and the second one in Vancouver in 1895. The Association was mandatory (Note: All Chinese were asked to donate $2. If they did not, they would have to pay much more if they ever required the services of the association.) for all Chinese in the area to join, and it did everything from representing members in legal disputes to sending the remains of a member who died back to his or her ancestral homeland in China.

== Marriage ==
Won Cumyow married Ye Eva Chan on November 29, 1889. A Chinese Methodist missionary family had adopted her and brought her to Canada from Hong Kong in 1888. Together Won Cumyow and Ye Eva had ten children. Their third son, Gordon Won Cumyow, took over the position of court interpreter and in 1951 became the first Chinese notary public in Canada.

== Death ==
Won Cumyow died on October 6, 1955, in Vancouver.

== Legacy ==
Won Cumyow was one of eight finalists for the $5 polymer bills in Canada.

The City of Vancouver opened the Won Alexander Cumyow Civic Office, a satellite municipal government office serving the city's Chinatown, in 2023.

== See also ==
- Economic History of Vancouver
