= Rogers Sugar =

Canadian holding company

- Formerly: Rogers Sugar Income Fund
- Type: Public
- Traded as: TSX: RSI
- Industry: Sugar, Sweeteners, Maple Syrup, Maple Sugar/Flakes, Maple Treats
- Headquarters: 4026 Rue Notre-Dame; Montréal, Québec; H1W 2K3
- Key people: Dallas Ross, Chairman; Michael Walton, President and CEO; Mike Walton, COO; Jean-Sébastien Couillard, VP of Finance and CFO; Patrick Dionne, VP Operations & Supply Chain
- Number of employees: 700
- Divisions: Lantic Sugar, Rogers Sugar, The Maple Treat Corp, Decacer
- Subsidiaries: Lantic Inc.
- Website: lanticrogers.com

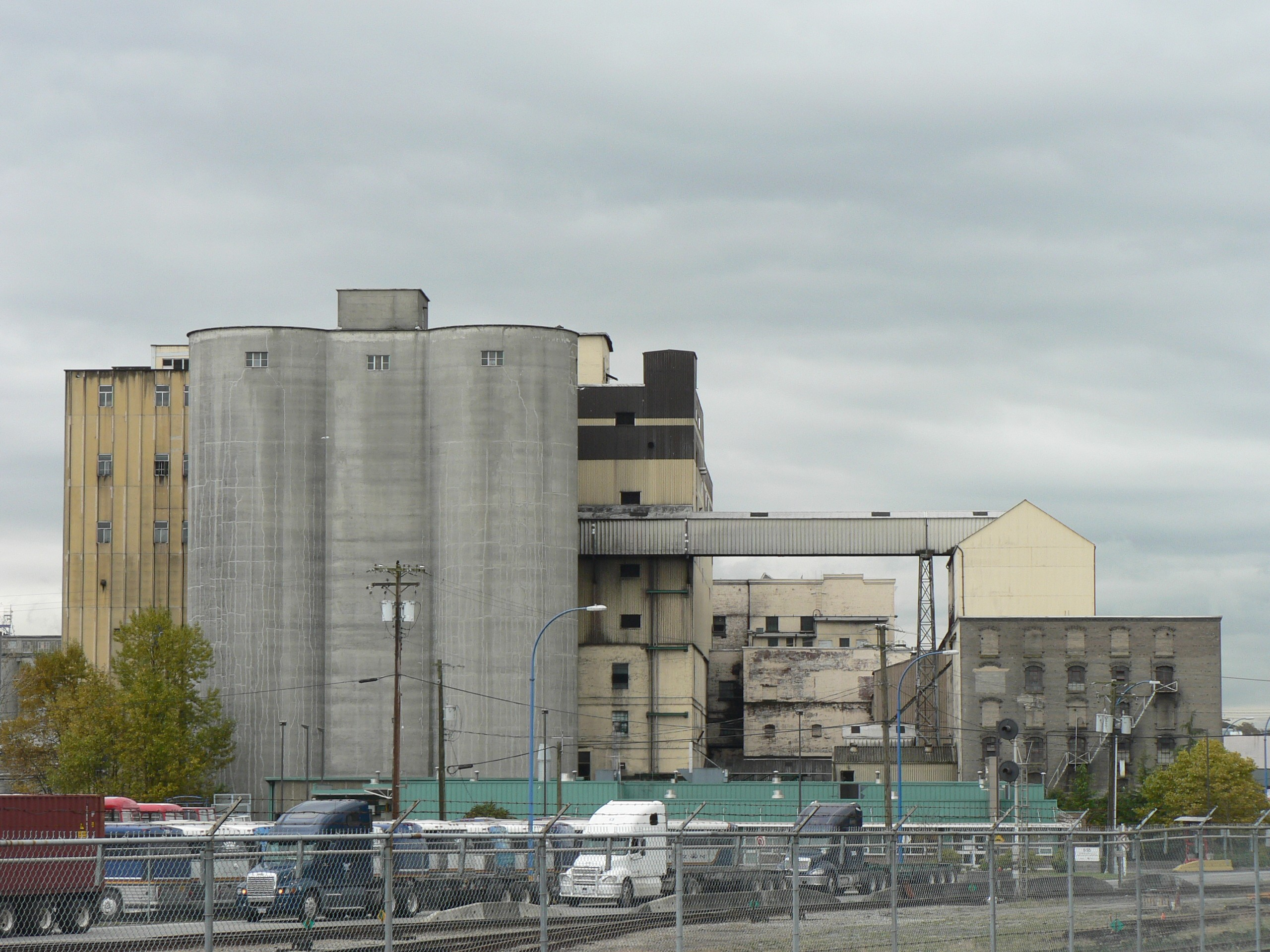
Rogers Sugar refinery in Vancouver, November 2006

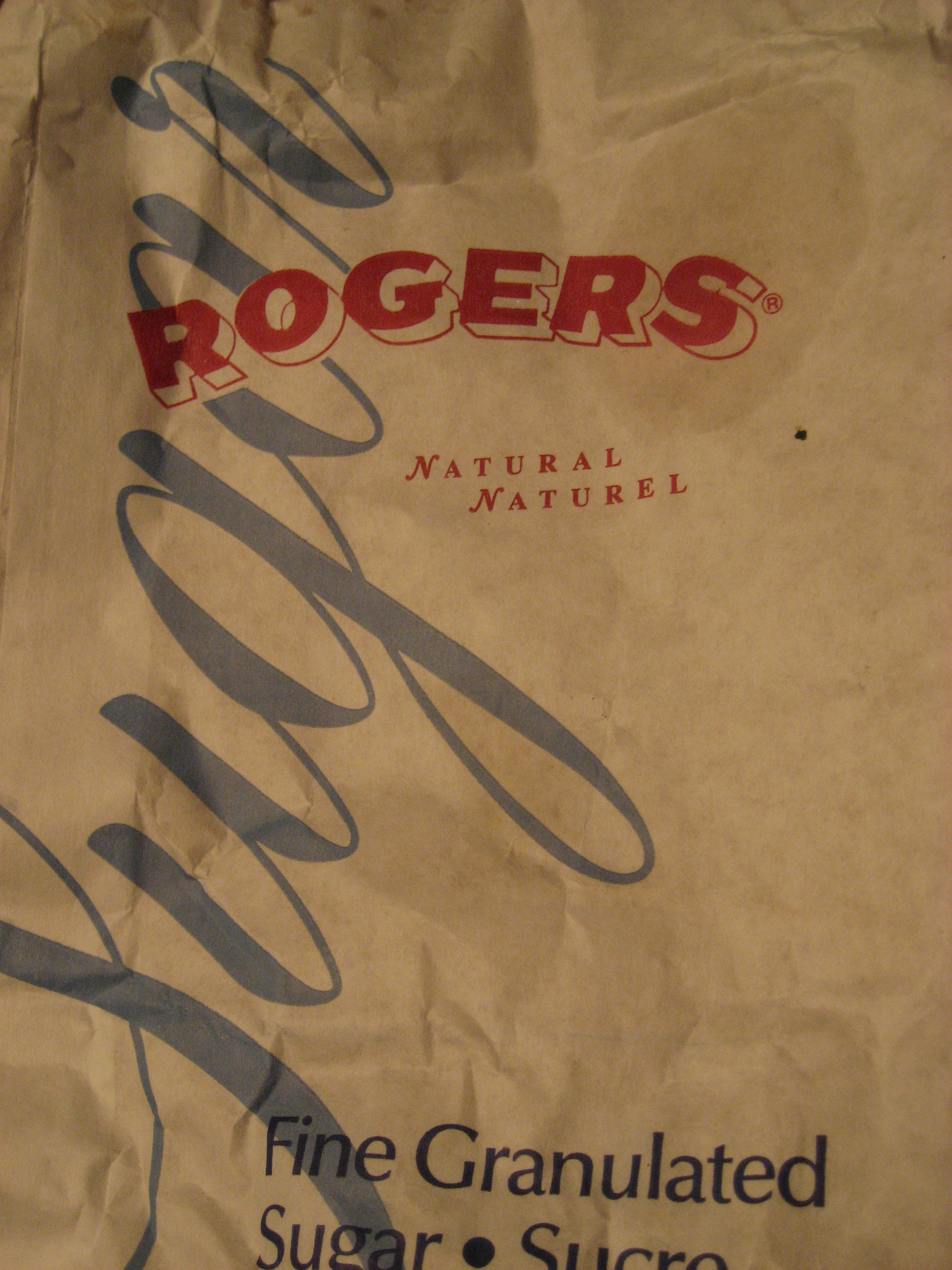
A bag of Rogers Sugar

Rogers Sugar Inc. is the Canadian holding company of Lantic Inc., which was established in June 2008 after the merger of Lantic Sugar Limited operating in Montreal, Quebec and Rogers Sugar Ltd. (operating in Western Canada). It is the largest refined sugar distributor in Canada. Established as Rogers Sugar Income Fund in October 1997, the income trust was converted to a regular corporation, Rogers Sugar Inc. in January 2011.

== History ==
The company began as two companies on both the east coast and west coast of Canada. The original Rogers Sugar company was established in Vancouver, British Columbia as the British Columbia Sugar Refining Company in 1890 by its American-born founder, Benjamin Tingley Rogers, whose father was president of E.J. Gay’s Sugar of New Orleans.

Atlantic Sugar Refineries was established in 1912 from the merger of three sugar refineries, including Acadia Sugar Refining Co. (established 1893 in Halifax, Nova Scotia), and later renamed as Lantic Sugar Limited. The company was owned from 1981 to 1990 by Steinberg's, a chain of supermarkets. In 1984, Lantic Sugar acquired St. Lawrence Sugar, which was formed in 1888 in Montreal. Lantic Inc. was created from the merger of Rogers Sugar and Lantic Sugar on June 30, 2008.

On September 28, 2023, 135 employees at the Vancouver refinery walked off the job after issuing a 72-hour strike notice. They had been attempting to negotiate with the company for six months after their contract expired. Lantic was demanding major concessions in regards to hours worked and benefits. In 2022, the company had the highest EBITDA balance recorded in its history.

== Facilities ==
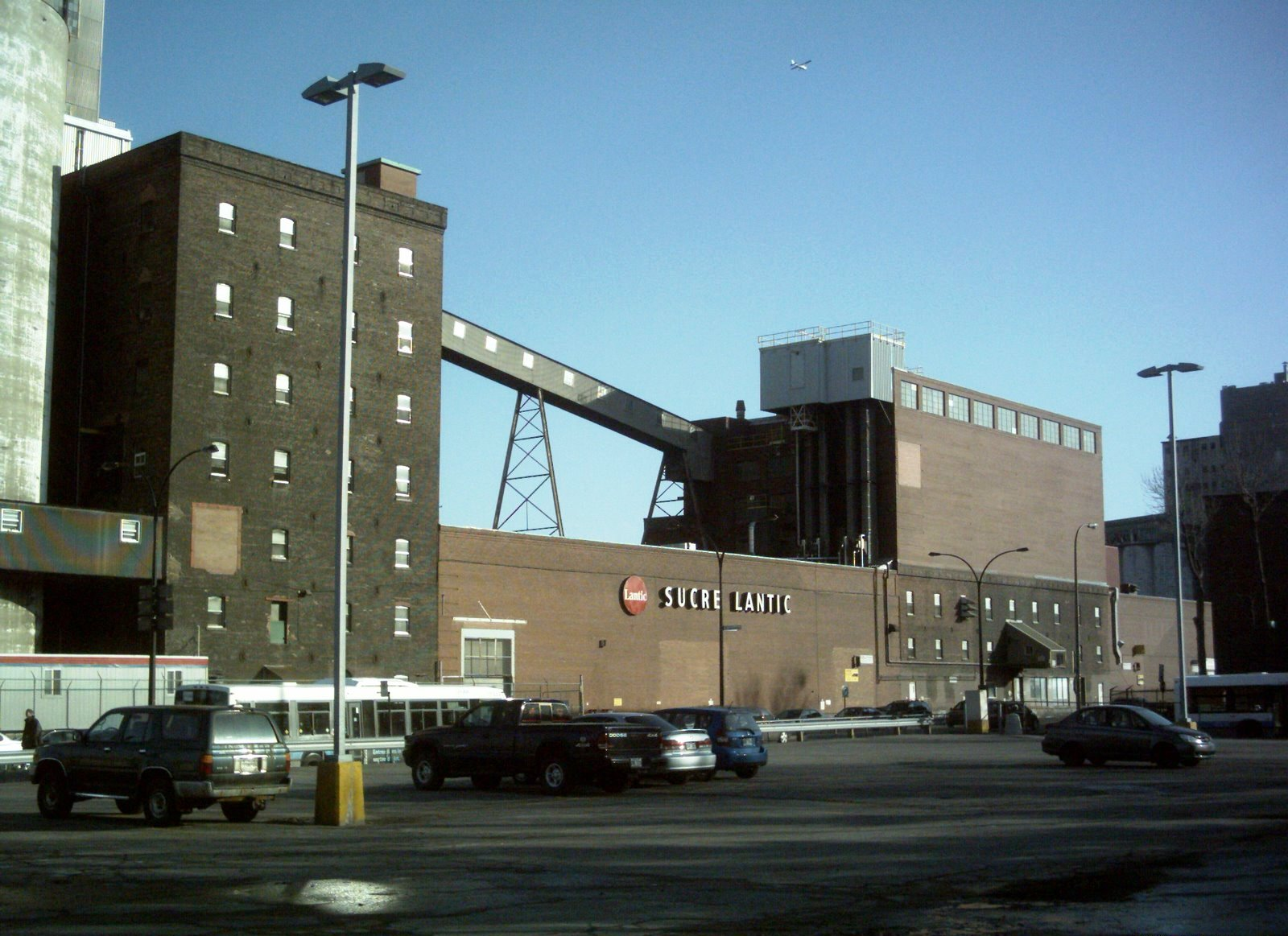
Lantic Sugar plant in Montreal, March 2009

The combined company operates these facilities:

- Montreal cane refinery: The Montreal refinery was originally built in 1888 by St. Lawrence Sugar. A major upgrade was completed in December 2000, upgrading normal capacity to 440,000 tonnes (970,000,000 lb) permitting the Saint John, New Brunswick plant to close in July 2000. In February 2024, Rogers Sugar raises $110 million through an equity offering to partially finance a 20% expansion of Lantic's Montreal plant's sugar production capacity.
- Vancouver cane refinery: The facility is at the port of Vancouver; it primarily processes imported raw sugar into sugar products.
- Taber sugar beet factory: The Taber, Alberta plant processes sugar beet into sugar products. It contracts with nearly 400 farmers each year to plant and grow sugar beets.
- Toronto distribution centre: The warehouse is in New Toronto at 198 New Toronto Street and it receives processed sugar by rail distributing it for the region of Ontario. It also stores liquid sugar in tanks and is a liquid sucrose melt facility.
- Toronto blending operation: The facility is in Scarborough at 230 Midwest Road. It is 65,000 square feet (6,000 m^{2}) and used for bulk dry blending services.
