= John Sullivan Deas =

Black Canadian tinsmith

John Sullivan Deas (c. 1838 – July 22, 1880) was a Black tinsmith who helped found the salmon canning industry on the Fraser River in southern British Columbia, Canada. His cannery was located on Deas Island, which bears his name to this day. In 2017, he was named one of 150 noteworthy British Columbians by The Vancouver Sun.

== Early life and career ==
John Sullivan Deas was born in South Carolina, approximately in the year 1838. He made a name for himself as a tinsmith by 1856; he would have still been a teenage at this time.

=== San Francisco ===
By 1860, he relocated to San Francisco where he shared an address with other Black South Carolinians, Louis and Susan Mortimer and Z. Deas. Deas worked as a tinsmith from 1860-1861 in San Francisco and was employed by Martin Prag, who also owned an establishment on Vancouver Island.

=== Victoria ===
By 1862, Deas was established in Victoria in the colony of Vancouver Island. By late 1868, he was operating a hardware and stove business called Birmingham House at the corner of Fort and Broad Streets.

== Salmon canning ==
John Sullivan Deas entered the salmon canning business in 1871, when he was hired by Captain Edward Stamp to make the cans for his pioneering canning business. Deas continued this work after Stamp died of a heart attack during a trip to England and eventually built his own cannery on what is now known as Deas Island in 1873. Labels for canned salmon produced at the cannery read "Fresh Salmon, John S. Deas, Frazer [sic] River, British Columbia" and were lithographed by San Francisco firm G.T. Brown & Co. owned by Black artist Grafton Tyler Brown. Deas was the lead canner on the Fraser River during this time and produced twice as much as his competitors during the 1872 and 1873 seasons. More competitors began canning businesses along the Fraser River in the years that followed, and Deas' canning business fell from its lead position. On August 19, 1878 Deas announced he had "sold all right, title, and interest in the fishery on Deas' Island, Fraser River to Messrs. Findlay, Durham and Brodie and my connection with the same ceases from this date." The business sold for fifteen thousand dollars.

== Personal life ==
John Sullivan Deas married Fanny Harris from Hamilton, Canada West on September 4, 1862. After selling the cannery on Deas Island, he moved to Portland, Oregon to rejoin his family and died only two years later. He was survived by his wife Fanny and seven children when he died on July 22, 1880.
