= Saint John harbour =

Saint John harbour can refer to several things related to this east coast Canadian harbour:

- Saint John Harbour - Harbour in the city of Saint John.
- Saint John Harbour (electoral district), a current provincial electoral district
- Saint John Harbour (1974-1995), a former provincial electoral district
- Saint John, New Brunswick harbour cleanup, pollution abatement program
- Saint John Harbour Bridge, a former toll bridge
- Port of Saint John, the federal agency which administers the harbour infrastructure
