= Port management =

Management of activities in a seaport

Port management is the planning, organization, and control of activities within a seaport to ensure safe, efficient, and profitable movement of ships, cargo, and passengers. It involves coordinating vessel traffic, terminal operations, cargo handling, storage, security, maintenance, and administrative functions so that maritime and landside transport systems work together smoothly.

Modern port management also focuses on infrastructure development, digital systems, environmental compliance, and stakeholder coordination, including shipping lines, customs authorities, logistics providers, and local governments. Effective port management is essential to global trade, as ports act as critical links for sea, rail, road, and inland waterway transport networks.

== History ==
During the 19th century and first half of the 20th century, "port-related costs were relatively insignificant in comparison to the high cost of ocean transport and inland transport. As a result, there was little incentive to improve port efficiency."

In the second half of the 20th century port competition began and had obvious consequences such as Rotterdam replacing Liverpool for oil transport. In the 21st century, international competition between ports has increased to maximize efficiency, abandoning public control and encouraging operations by the private sector.

== Definition for larger ports ==
According to a syllabus of the United Nations University from 1998:

Large ports need to deal with a number of disparate activities: the movement of ships, containers, and other cargo, the loading and unloading of ships and containers, customs activities. As well as human resources, anchorages, channels, lighter, tugs, berths, warehouse, and other storage spaces have to be allocated and released. The efficient management of a port involves managing these activities and resources, managing the flows of money involved between the agents providing and using these resources, and providing management information.

== Port business models ==
There are three broad port business models:

1. The landlord business model in which: "the port is an entity that owns the port infrastructure and has agreements with third party operators";
2. The integrated model in which "the port is itself an operator that provides all cargo handling services"; and
3. The mixed model in which "the port management body partly provides terminal-handling services in-house and partly relies on third-party operators"

== Environmental management and regulation ==
In 2008 The World Ports Climate Declaration (WPCD) was adopted by 55 of the world's largest ports, committing to the long-term work on implementation of initiatives addressing environmental issues. Another notable initiative, The Green Marine (GM) certification program, in which North American maritime corporations, including ports, seek to reduce their environmental impacts, was founded in 2007. An evaluation of this program for Canadian ports over the course of eight years, however, show that only 7 out of 18 major ports "proactively integrated sustainability into their operations". The importance of environmental port regulation and management owes to the fact that the activities of ports are positioned in the intersection between energy and transport systems and connect a network of different sectors, markets, and value chains, making them a central part of the global economy. While several functional activities are centered around ports, such as cargo handling and storage operations, intermodal connection, industrial activities, and port expansion, the most prevalent port activity is that of shipping, making the regulation of ports primarily driven by the IMO.

The effectiveness of measures taken by ports only become consequential if adoption rates are high, suggesting that port collaboration and coordination around common schemes is needed. Without such coordination, competition between ports could lead to a distortion of competition and environmental taxation where ports that are more heavily taxed suffer from shipping being diverted to rival ports. This is consistent with findings of a trade-off between port competitiveness and environmental protection measures taken by ports – a mechanism that is stronger for developing countries.

The adoption of environmental initiatives by ports is influenced by several different factors. Firstly, some ports are more likely to adopt measures than others. Ports in the EU have generally made more progress adopting environmental measures than North American and Asian Pacific ports. Ports closer to densely populated areas are more likely to adopt these measures. Some experts posit that this owes to more pressure being put on these ports, since their pollution immediately affects close populations. Ports operating with a landlord business model are also more likely to adopt abatement measures. Ports that specialize in servicing container shipping are more likely to adopt abatement measures as compared to ports handling bulk commodities. Experts posit that this is likely connected with the nature of container ship activities. Container ships generally have a fixed round-trip route ensuring frequent and regular visits to specific ports. Because these ship calls are more frequent there is also a higher potential for emissions abatement. Further, container lines carry goods for producers which increasingly need to live up to sustainability requirements through their supply chain, making it increasingly necessary for container lines to focus on their environmental performance, if they want to keep these producers as customers. In turn, ports servicing container ships would need to respond with stronger emissions abatement measures, in efforts to keep container lines as their customers.

Secondly, the types of initiatives most widely adopted focus on international environmental policy and management; investment in proactive environmental solutions; and enhanced stakeholder engagement. Policy and management of ports predominantly centers around measures of regulating environmental standards over other measures such as pricing, market access control, and the monitoring and measuring of port activities. In landlord ports and ports near densely populated areas both pricing strategies incentivizing port users to shift to low-emission technology and monitoring are more likely to be adopted over other measures such as improving operational efficiency or providing alternative fuel sources. Adoption also depends on governments and their regulatory agenda along with the financial capacity and competence of port authorities. When comparing European and West African ports, experts found that ports in Europe tend to focus on technical infrastructure and measures addressing air quality, energy and climate change mitigation, while ports in West Africa typically have an integrated business model and mostly implement measures targeting sustainable waste management, oil spills and ballast water management.

== See also ==
- American Association of Port Authorities
- Port authority
- Port security
