= Skulte Port =

Port in Latvia

- Click on the map for a fullscreen view

Location
- Country: Latvia
- Coordinates: 57°18′58″N 24°24′21″E

Statistics
- Website www.skulteport.lv

Skulte Port (Latvian: Skultes osta) is the port authority of Zvejniekciems, Latvia. The port lies at the mouth of the Aģe River covering approximately 62.7 hectares (155 acres), and is situated at the address 41 Upes Street.
