= Reverse flow =

Reverse flow may refer to:

- In engine technology a reverse flow cylinder head is one that locates the intake and exhaust ports on the same side of the engine.
- Reverse logistics, i.e. goods/waste flowing in the distribution network having consumers as point of origin
- Reverse electron flow is a mechanism in microbial metabolism
- In fluid mechanics, a fluid-flow phenomenon often associated with flow separation

== See also ==
- List of rivers that have reversed direction
