= Toledo, Oregon =

- City
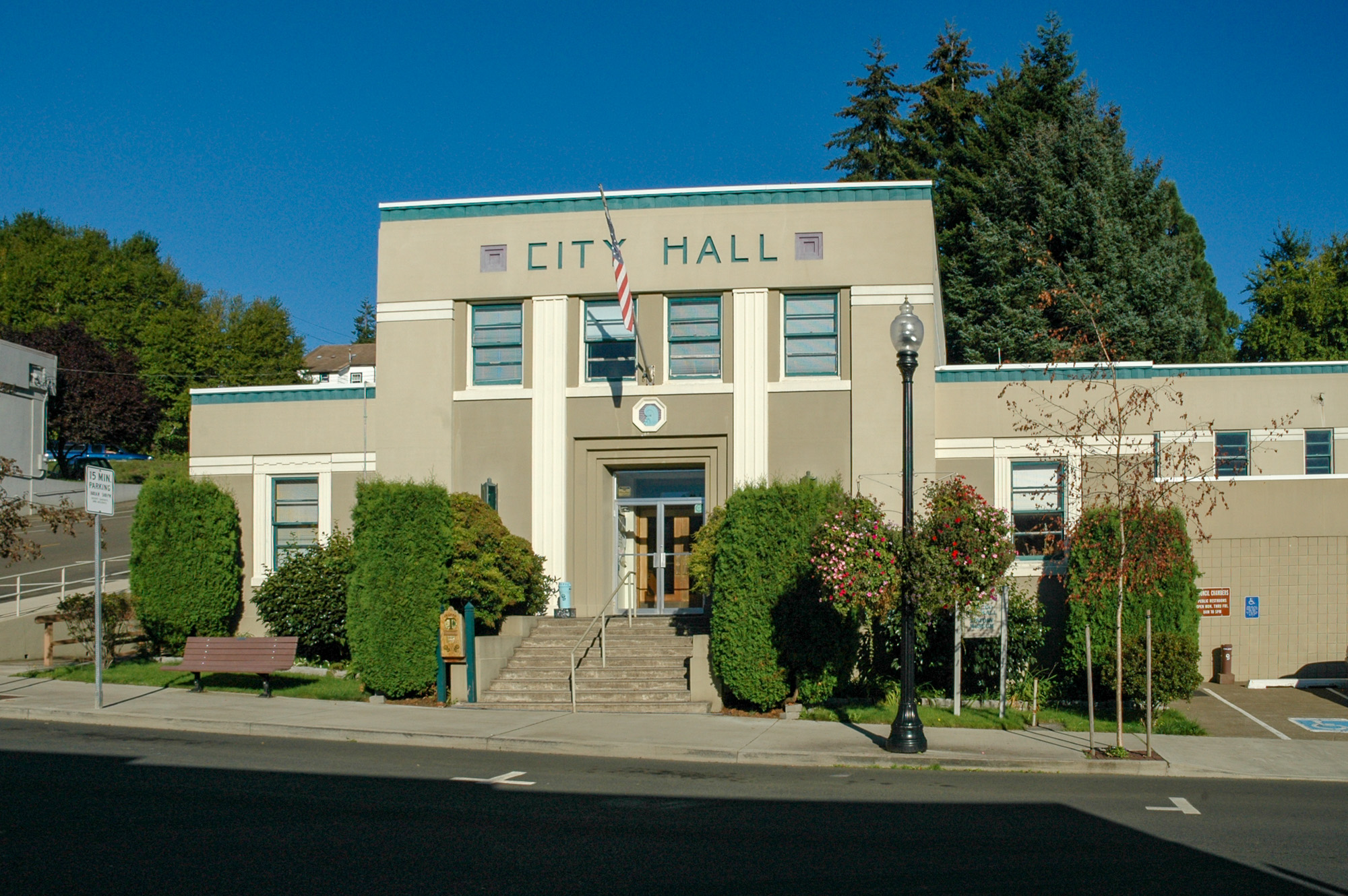
- The city hall building in Toledo

- Location in Oregon
- Coordinates: 44°37′28″N 123°56′11″W
- Country: United States
- State: Oregon
- County: Lincoln
- Incorporated: 1893, 1905

Government
  - Type: Council–manager
  - Mayor: Tracy Mix
  - City Manager: Rich Huebner

Area
  - Total: 2.39 sq mi (6.20 km^{2})
  - Land: 2.16 sq mi (5.59 km^{2})
  - Water: 0.24 sq mi (0.61 km^{2})
- Elevation: 174 ft (53 m)

Population (2020)
  - Total: 3,546
  - Density: 1,643.4/sq mi (634.53/km^{2})
- Time zone: UTC-8 (PST)
  - Summer (DST): UTC-7 (PDT)
- ZIP code: 97391
- Area code: 541
- FIPS code: 41-74000
- GNIS feature ID: 2412076
- Website: www.cityoftoledo.org

Toledo /toLIdou/ is a city located on the Yaquina River and along U.S. Route 20 in Lincoln County, in the U.S. state of Oregon. The 2020 census tallied the population at 3,546.

== History ==
European-American settlement in Toledo began in 1866, when John Graham, his son Joseph, and William Mackey claimed land made available by the Homestead Act of 1862. The site was called "Graham's Landing" until a post office was established two years later. Joseph D. Graham, John's son, named the post office for Toledo, Ohio, because he was homesick. William Mackey was the first postmaster.

Toledo was made the county seat of the newly established Lincoln County in 1893. The city incorporated in 1893 and reincorporated in 1905. Charles Barton Crosno served as the first mayor.

In 1918, the Port of Toledo leased land to the Spruce Production Division for a sawmill to cut airplane frames for World War I. However, before production began at the site, the war ended. C. D. Johnson and associates formed a subsidiary, Pacific Spruce Corporation, which in 1920 bought the mill and related equipment, which by 1922 processed logs shipped to Toledo by rail and logs floated down the Yaquina River from nearby Lincoln County Logging camps. Georgia-Pacific acquired the operation in 1952 and turned it into a pulp mill by 1957.

In 1925, the Pacific Spruce Corporation decided to hire Japanese contract labor to sort lumber in its Toledo sawmill. Managers informed local employees that only the Japanese would work the graveyard shift. The sawmill employees did not object, but local businessmen opposed bringing Japanese workers into the community. Two days after the Japanese arrived, a mob forced a Japanese labor crew to leave town, in what came to be known as the Toledo incident. A year later, Tamakichi Ogura, one of the men who had been expelled, filed a lawsuit in the United States District Court alleging that nine individuals who he could specifically identify had been involved in assaulting him, stealing his property, and forcibly removing him from the Toledo community. After a nine-day trial, the jury unanimously agreed with Ogura and awarded him $2,500 in damages plus court costs. A book was written about this called The Toledo Incident of 1925.

Between 1927 and 1944, the Creamery Package Manufacturing Company, based in Chicago, operated a substantial sawmill and stock cooperage in Toledo. This mill was dedicated to producing butter tub stock, churning out up to two million spruce butter tubs annually. The butter was shipped in 63 pound tubs as knockdown kits via rail to three Midwestern factories for regional assembly and distribution.

The county seat was moved from Toledo to Newport in 1953. To make matters worse, an improved U.S. Route 20 bypassed the city, (Special routes of U.S. Route 20) and as a result, many businesses relocated to Newport.

The city was a 2009 All-America City Award finalist.

== Geography ==
According to the United States Census Bureau, the city has a total area of 2.41 square miles (6.24 km^{2}), of which, 2.18 square miles (5.65 km^{2}) is land and 0.23 square miles (0.60 km^{2}) is water.

Climate data for Toledo, Oregon
Month	Jan	Feb	Mar	Apr	May	Jun	Jul	Aug	Sep	Oct	Nov	Dec	Year
Record high °F (°C)	77 (25)	77 (25)	83 (28)	88 (31)	94 (34)	100 (38)	100 (38)	98 (37)	97 (36)	94 (34)	88 (31)	73 (23)	100 (38)
Mean daily maximum °F (°C)	51.0 (10.6)	53.9 (12.2)	56.4 (13.6)	59.8 (15.4)	64.1 (17.8)	67.8 (19.9)	72.1 (22.3)	72.9 (22.7)	70.4 (21.3)	62.9 (17.2)	54.4 (12.4)	49.1 (9.5)	61.2 (16.2)
Mean daily minimum °F (°C)	38.1 (3.4)	38.1 (3.4)	39.6 (4.2)	41.4 (5.2)	45.2 (7.3)	49.2 (9.6)	52.0 (11.1)	52.1 (11.2)	49.0 (9.4)	45.2 (7.3)	41.1 (5.1)	37.2 (2.9)	44.0 (6.7)
Record low °F (°C)	4 (−16)	12 (−11)	21 (−6)	20 (−7)	28 (−2)	30 (−1)	33 (1)	32 (0)	31 (−1)	25 (−4)	18 (−8)	1 (−17)	1 (−17)
Average precipitation inches (mm)	10.94 (278)	9.22 (234)	8.41 (214)	5.42 (138)	3.94 (100)	2.83 (72)	1.09 (28)	1.12 (28)	2.63 (67)	5.46 (139)	11.56 (294)	12.30 (312)	74.92 (1,904)
Average snowfall inches (cm)	0.1 (0.25)	0.6 (1.5)	0.1 (0.25)	0 (0)	0 (0)	0 (0)	0 (0)	0 (0)	0 (0)	0 (0)	0 (0)	0.1 (0.25)	0.9 (2.3)

== Demographics ==
Historical population
Census	Pop.	Note	%±
1900	302		—
1910	541		79.1%
1920	678		25.3%
1930	2,187		222.6%
1940	2,288		4.6%
1950	2,323		1.5%
1960	3,053		31.4%
1970	2,818		−7.7%
1980	3,151		11.8%
1990	3,174		0.7%
2000	3,472		9.4%
2010	3,465		−0.2%
2020	3,546		2.3%
U.S. Decennial Census

=== 2020 census ===
As of the 2020 census, Toledo had a population of 3,546. The median age was 38.5 years. 23.7% of residents were under the age of 18 and 16.2% of residents were 65 years of age or older. For every 100 females there were 94.2 males, and for every 100 females age 18 and over there were 91.3 males age 18 and over.

0% of residents lived in urban areas, while 100.0% lived in rural areas.

There were 1,369 households in Toledo, of which 34.9% had children under the age of 18 living in them. Of all households, 43.2% were married-couple households, 17.5% were households with a male householder and no spouse or partner present, and 26.2% were households with a female householder and no spouse or partner present. About 24.1% of all households were made up of individuals and 11.0% had someone living alone who was 65 years of age or older.

There were 1,491 housing units, of which 8.2% were vacant. Among occupied housing units, 62.6% were owner-occupied and 37.4% were renter-occupied. The homeowner vacancy rate was 1.8% and the rental vacancy rate was 5.5%.

Racial composition as of the 2020 census
Race	Number	Percent
White	2,980	84.0%
Black or African American	8	0.2%
American Indian and Alaska Native	136	3.8%
Asian	18	0.5%
Native Hawaiian and Other Pacific Islander	0	0%
Some other race	60	1.7%
Two or more races	344	9.7%
Hispanic or Latino (of any race)	238	6.7%

=== 2010 census ===
As of the census of 2010, there were 3,465 people, 1,331 households, and 907 families residing in the city. The population density was 1,589.4 inhabitants per square mile (613.7/km^{2}). There were 1,474 housing units at an average density of 676.1 per square mile (261.0/km^{2}). The racial makeup of the city was 89.9% White, 0.6% African American, 3.8% Native American, 0.5% Asian, 0.1% Pacific Islander, 1.2% from other races, and 3.9% from two or more races. Hispanic or Latino of any race were 4.7% of the population.

There were 1,331 households, of which 33.9% had children under the age of 18 living with them, 47.5% were married couples living together, 14.2% had a female householder with no husband present, 6.5% had a male householder with no wife present, and 31.9% were non-families. 22.7% of all households were made up of individuals, and 6.1% had someone living alone who was 65 years of age or older. The average household size was 2.60 and the average family size was 3.02.

The median age in the city was 37.6 years. 24.8% of residents were under the age of 18; 8.8% were between the ages of 18 and 24; 26.2% were from 25 to 44; 28.5% were from 45 to 64; and 11.8% were 65 years of age or older. The gender makeup of the city was 48.7% male and 51.3% female.

=== 2000 census ===
As of the census of 2000, there were 3,472 people in the city, organized into 1,312 households and 926 families. The population density was 1,602.2 inhabitants per square mile (618.6/km^{2}). There were 1,474 housing units at an average density of 680.2 per square mile (262.6/km^{2}). The racial makeup of the city was 91.88% White, 3.37% Native American, 0.58% Asian, 0.23% African American, 0.03% Pacific Islander, 0.52% from other races, and 3.40% from two or more races. 2.59% of the population were Hispanic or Latino of any race.

There were 1,312 households, out of which 37.7% had children under the age of 18 living with them, 51.5% were married couples living together, 14.0% had a female householder with no husband present, and 29.4% were non-families. 23.0% of all households were made up of individuals, and 9.5% had someone living alone who was 65 years of age or older. The average household size was 2.65 and the average family size was 3.05.

In the city, the population was spread out, with 29.6% under the age of 18, 6.9% from 18 to 24, 32.0% from 25 to 44, 20.9% from 45 to 64, and 10.6% who were 65 years of age or older. The median age was 34 years. For every 100 females, there were 97.4 males. For every 100 females age 18 and over, there were 92.7 males.

The median income for a household in the city was $34,503, and the median income for a family was $39,597. Males had a median income of $35,104 versus $22,297 for females. The per capita income for the city was $14,710. 19.3% of the population and 18.6% of families were below the poverty line. Out of the total population, 26.6% of those under the age of 18 and 8.9% of those 65 and older were living below the poverty line.

== Education ==
There are two public schools in Toledo, which are part of the Lincoln County School District: Toledo Elementary School (K–6) and Toledo High School (7–12). Toledo High School is a combination junior high and high school, and serves students in seventh through twelfth grade.

== Government ==
City Council members
Position	Name	Term
Mayor	Tracy Mix	Jan./2025 - Jan./2027
Seat 1	William Riley, III	Jan./2025 - Jan./2029
Seat 2	Eric Chambers	Jan./2023 - Jan./2027
Seat 3	Jackie Kauffman	Jan./2025 - Jan./2029
Seat 4	Stu Strom	Jan./2023 - Jan./2027
Seat 5	Andrew Keating	Jan./2025 - Jan./2029
Seat 6	Jackie Burns	Jan./2023 - Jan./2027

The City of Toledo operates under the Council-Manager form of government. Former Toledo mayor Rodney Cross was also a volunteer football coach at Toledo High School. In October 2025, Mayor Cross was criminally charged with harassment for slapping a student during a conversation with the student at the school's gym. Mayor Cross resigned on January 28, 2026. Council President Tracy Mix was appointed on February 4, 2026 by the City Council as Mayor to complete the remainder of the vacated term. The current City Manager is Rich Huebner.

== Transportation ==
Toledo is now the western terminus of a Portland and Western Railroad line. This route was once part of the Oregon Pacific Railroad, which was completed from Yaquina City through Toledo to Corvallis in 1885. This railroad later linked the city to Albany in 1887, with a 4000 foot long bridge across the Willamette River, in the Willamette Valley. The city is also served by the port authority (the Port of Toledo), and Toledo State Airport.

The area's railroad history is preserved and celebrated at the Yaquina Pacific Railroad Historical Society (YPRHS) in Toledo. Two local and historic Georgia-Pacific locomotives are on display at the museum. One locomotive is the "One Spot", a 2-8-2 steamer built by Baldwin Locomotive Works in 1922. This locomotive spent its entire working career within Lincoln County, from 1922 to 1959. The other locomotive at the museum is a GE 50 ton diesel, built in 1951 for the C.D. Johnson Lumber Co as their No. 8, which was later purchased by Georgia-Pacific. It was donated in 2016 to YPRHS. The Museum also has a restored Southern Pacific 1923 Railway Post Office / Baggage car.

=== First brick depot in Oregon ===
On 3 August 1893, Toledo became the first city to have a railroad depot made out of brick in Oregon. The reason to build a depot had to do with a dispute of a twenty-foot strip of land. The city of Toledo, at the time, had no depot provided to the citizens. However, the citizens of Toledo made a demand on the railroad commissioners asking that the Oregon Pacific be forced to provide reasonable accommodations there. The people of Toledo and Oregon Pacific agreed to a contract: the people would pay $250 in money and to furnish an equal amount of labor on the building. Oregon Pacific, in return, agreed to erect within sixty days from the date of the contract a brick depot building at Toledo of the size and dimensions as before agreed upon at 20 feet by 60 feet. The depot was later expanded and stuccoed by Southern Pacific Railroad in 1922-1923. The depot was torn down in 1961 to make way for street improvements.
