= Saint John Harbour Bridge =

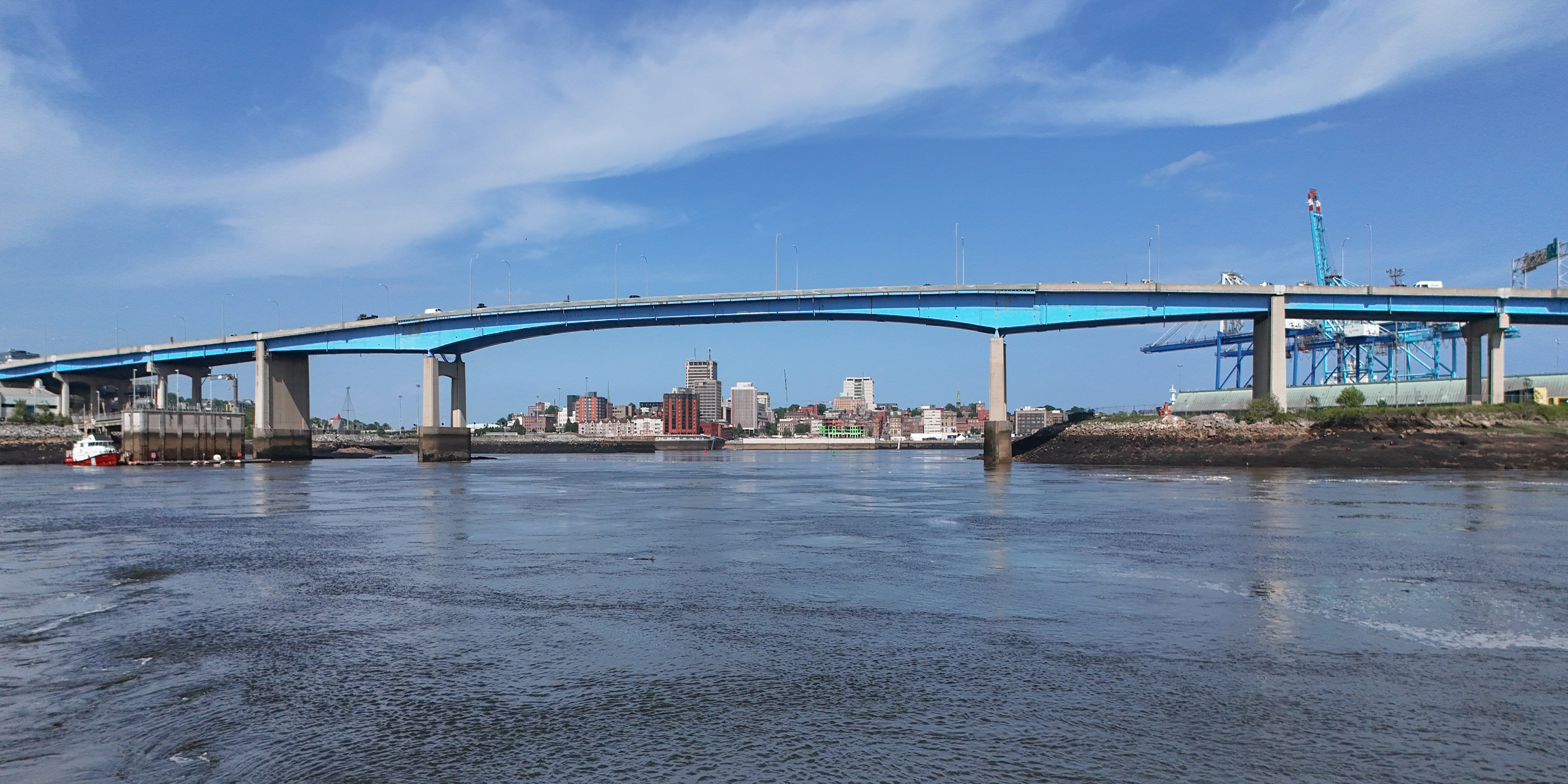
- Saint John Harbour Bridge, July 2025
- Coordinates: 45°15′59″N 66°04′27″W
- Carries: Route 1 (4 lanes)
- Crosses: Saint John Harbour
- Locale: Saint John, New Brunswick, Canada

Characteristics
- Design: Steel haunched box-girder
- Total length: 1,300 m (4,300 ft)
- Longest span: 250 m (820 ft)

History
- Opened: 1968

Statistics
- Toll: None

Location
- Interactive map of Saint John Harbour Bridge

The Saint John Harbour Bridge is three-span crossing of Saint John Harbour at the mouth of the Saint John River in Saint John, New Brunswick, Canada. It opened in 1968.

== History ==
Proposals for a bridge crossing of the Saint John Harbour had been a debated topic as early as 1874. During a House of Commons session in April of that year, there was discussion of potentially introducing a harbour crossing via Navy Island. John Ferris, MP of Queen's at the time, opposed the Navy Island crossing and argued that such a bridge would be "destructive to river craft," instead arguing that any harbour crossing should be placed at the Reversing Falls to be high enough to clear passing vessels.

By the mid-20th century, the rate of industrial and residential growth in Saint John and surrounding communities necessitated a second bridge over the Saint John River. The old Reversing Falls Bridge was adequate for handling the post-War traffic growth; however public concerns about where to build a new highway and bridge frustrated the idea for many years. On May 1, 1961 the city's Common Council appointed a 6-member citizens' committee which then directed various studies and discussions.

Ultimately, the bridge was built as a cooperative project between the federal, provincial and municipal governments. They decided to purchase the majority of the Mill Street Yard from the Canadian Pacific Railway for a new highway alignment which would run through the middle of the city downstream of Reversing Falls. The federally controlled National Harbours Board (now Ports Canada) would build the bridge. Part of this deal involved the NHB collecting a 25¢ toll in each direction. Under the original act prevented any toll increase for forty years without federal, provincial and municipal agreement.

The bridge's construction had early critics, including K. C. Irving, who in 1965 critiqued the $18 million budget through publicly released letters addressed to the vice-chairman of the Harbour Bridge Authority, the Common Council, and the mayor.

The selected location remains controversial as it prevents high-clearance vessels from navigating into the upper part of the Saint John Harbour. Construction of the bridge also drew to a close the status of Navy Island as an island within the Inner Harbour and resulted in the demolition of the historic neo-gothic Union Station. Earlier proposals had called for the Saint John Throughway and the bridge to be built north of the Reversing Falls gorge.

== Design and capacity ==
Saint John Harbour Bridge was designed and built as a hollow box, haunched girder structure. It carries four lanes of traffic across 3 spans, measuring 125 metres (410 ft), 250 metres (820 ft), and 125 metres (410 ft). Contracts for the four main piers were signed in September 1965 and the crossing opened on August 17, 1968 as part of the ambitious Saint John Throughway project.

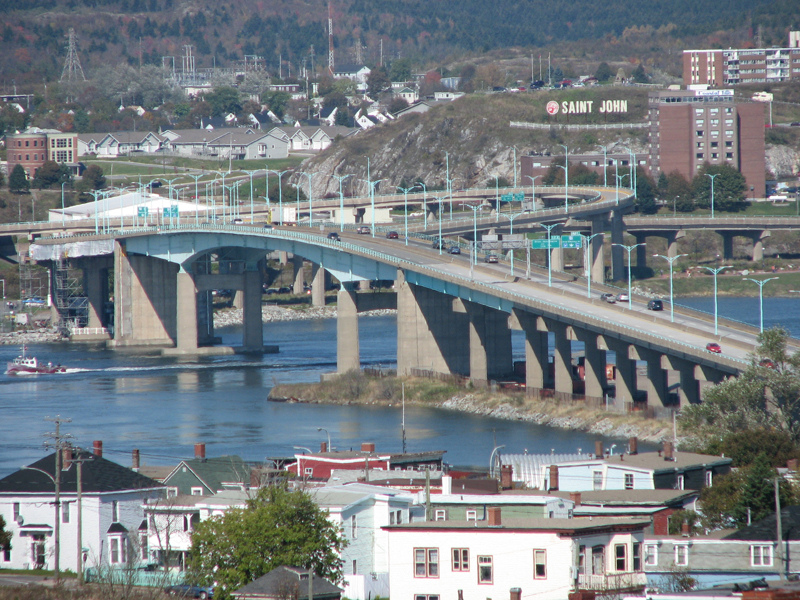
The bridge in 2006

Tolls were set at 25 cents when the bridge was constructed. The Harbour Bridge Authority increased the cash-toll from $0.25 to $0.50 for regular commuter traffic beginning January, 2007. This is the first, and only, permitted rate increase since the bridge was built; however, by 2010, the tolls were eliminated, and the building later demolished.

== Transfer of authority ==
Meanwhile, by 2010, more than forty years after the bridge was built, it was in need of more than $35 million worth of repairs. Without the necessary repairs, the Harbour Bridge Authority warned it would need to close two lanes of traffic and impose weight restrictions on the bridge, threatening to inhibit traffic flow during commute times as well as posing as a problem to transports coming to and from the bordering state of Maine, USA.

The three levels of government negotiating the project's financing. On November 26, 2010 Stephen Harper and David Alward announced an agreement. It eliminated the toll and wiped away a $22.6 million debt, while the Federal Government agreed to pay for half of the $35 million structural repairs.

The Bridge Authority was abolished and management of the bridge was placed under the New Brunswick Department of Transportation and Infrastructure. In 2013, the Department announced that it had sold the office building formerly used by the Bridge Authority to the Saint John Port Authority.

== See also ==
- List of bridges in Canada
