= Port of Toledo =

Coordinates: 44.618518°N 123.937667°W

- Interactive map of Port of Toledo

Location
- Country: United States
- Location: Toledo, Oregon

Details
- Opened: May 21, 1910
- Size: 443 mi^{2} (1,150 km^{2})
- President: Rick Graff

Statistics
- Website www.portoftoledo.org

The Port of Toledo is the port authority for Toledo, in the U.S. state of Oregon. Its headquarters are 7 miles (11 km) inland from the Oregon Coast on Depot Slough, near the Yaquina River. The port was founded in 1910 after the passing of a new state law, at a time when many U.S. port authorities were founded.

The port provides commercial moorages, ship repair facilities, and industrial space.

Recreational facilities include recreational moorage, launch facilities, and a non-motorized paddle park and launch area that is used by kayakers, canoeists and bird watchers. The port sponsors an annual wooden boat show on the third weekend in August.

The port's only shipyard was shut down in November 2008 after its private owner abandoned the operation. In June 2010, the port was planning to purchase that shipyard, in hopes of capturing the ship maintenance business of the National Oceanic and Atmospheric Administration (NOAA) homeport in Newport, which is downriver from Toledo.
