= Port of Saint John =

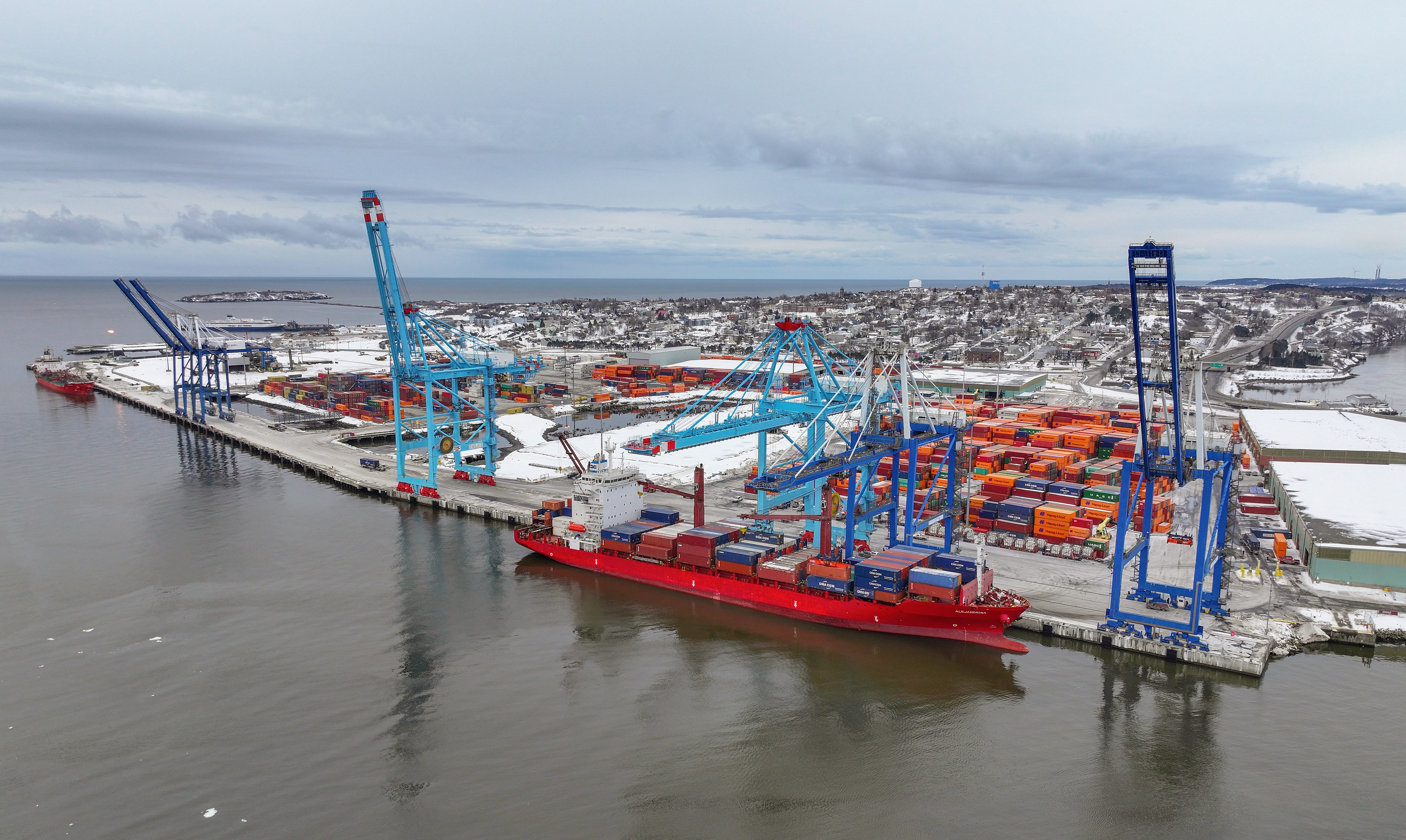
- Western container port
- Interactive map of Port of Saint John

Location
- Country: Canada
- Location: Saint John, New Brunswick
- Coordinates: 45°15′16″N 66°1′56″W
- UN/LOCODE: CASJB

Details
- Opened: Eighteenth century
- Size: 141 hectares
- No. of berths: 17
- Draft depth: 17.5 m.
- President and CEO: Craig Bell Estabrooks

Statistics
- Vessel arrivals: 1000
- Annual cargo tonnage: 27,454,799 metric revenue tons (FY2022)
- Annual container volume: 150,194 twenty-foot equivalent units (TEU) (FY2022)
- Passenger traffic: 147890 passengers (FY 2022)
- Annual revenue: CDN$23.8 million (FY 2018)
- Net income: CDN$4.5 million (FY 2018)
- Website www.sjport.com

The Port of Saint John is a port complex that occupies 141 hectares (350 acres) of land along 3,900 m (12,800 ft) of waterfront of the Saint John Harbour at the mouth of the Saint John River in the city of Saint John, New Brunswick, Canada. The Port of Saint John, with facilities on both sides of the river, and has an 8m tide twice a day. Because of the semi-diurnal tides and the river influence, slack water occurs at approximately half tide and not at high or low water as at most other ports.

The port is administered by the Saint John Port Authority, a federal agency. Major products shipped through the port include oil, forest products and potash. Container traffic has been steadily increasing since 2016 with DP World becoming the port operator and Canadian Pacific regaining access to the port in 2020 through the purchase of Central Maine and Quebec Railway. The port of Saint John has four container lines servicing it those being MSC, CMA CGM Maersk and Hapag-Lloyd. Port Saint John is serviced by three class one railways (CN,CPKC, CSX).

== History ==
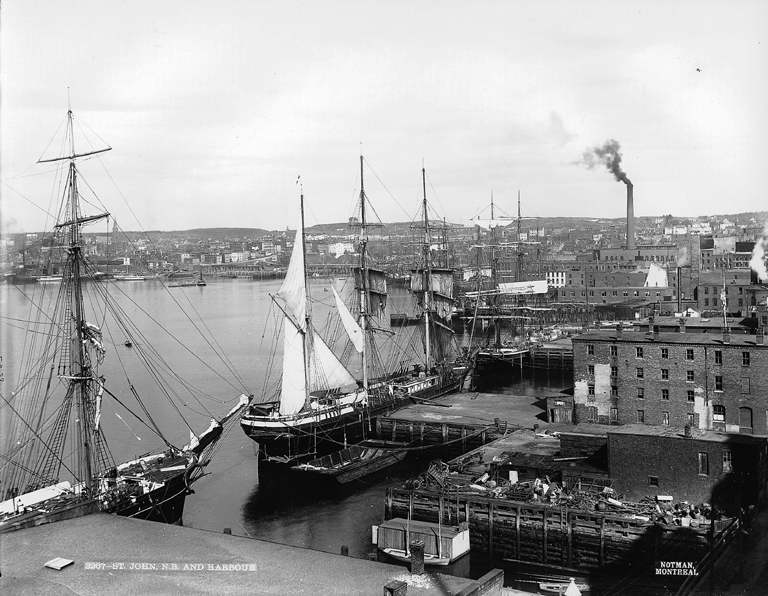
St. John Harbour about 1898

The Port of Saint John lies within Mi'gma'gi, the Mikmaw Nation ancestral stewardship region and greater Wabanaki Confederacy ancestral governance area. The location was first visited by Samuel de Champlain on his voyage of discovery to the New World in 1604, who described the Saint John River as "one of the largest and deepest we had yet seen" and who was advised by his Mi'kmaq guides that the river provided a route to the Saint Lawrence River valley with only a short portage. Because of its strategic location, it became the site of a French stronghold known as Fort La Tour. Though the fort was sacked in 1645, the river remained an important trade route for French, English and First Nations traders throughout the 17th and 18th centuries.

The port did not begin to develop in earnest until the arrival of United Empire Loyalists in 1783, who sought refuge after the American Revolution and later founded the city in 1785. It developed rapidly as a result of timber trade and shipbuilding. Saint John became the province's leading industrial centre during the 19th century with much of the shipbuilding industry being concentrated on Courtney Bay outside the main harbour area. One of the best known ships built in Saint John was the Marco Polo (1851) which became renowned for its speed.

The Great Famine of Ireland of 1845–1849 saw a large immigrant influx, and to handle the new arrivals, the government constructed a quarantine station and hospital on Partridge Island at the mouth of the harbour. The immigration station continued to operate for many decades. In 1859, Partridge Island also became known as the site of the first successful demonstration of an automated steam-powered foghorn, invented by the Scotsman Robert Foulis who had settled in the city. The foghorn is "ranked by historians as one of the most outstanding in the development of navigation aids."

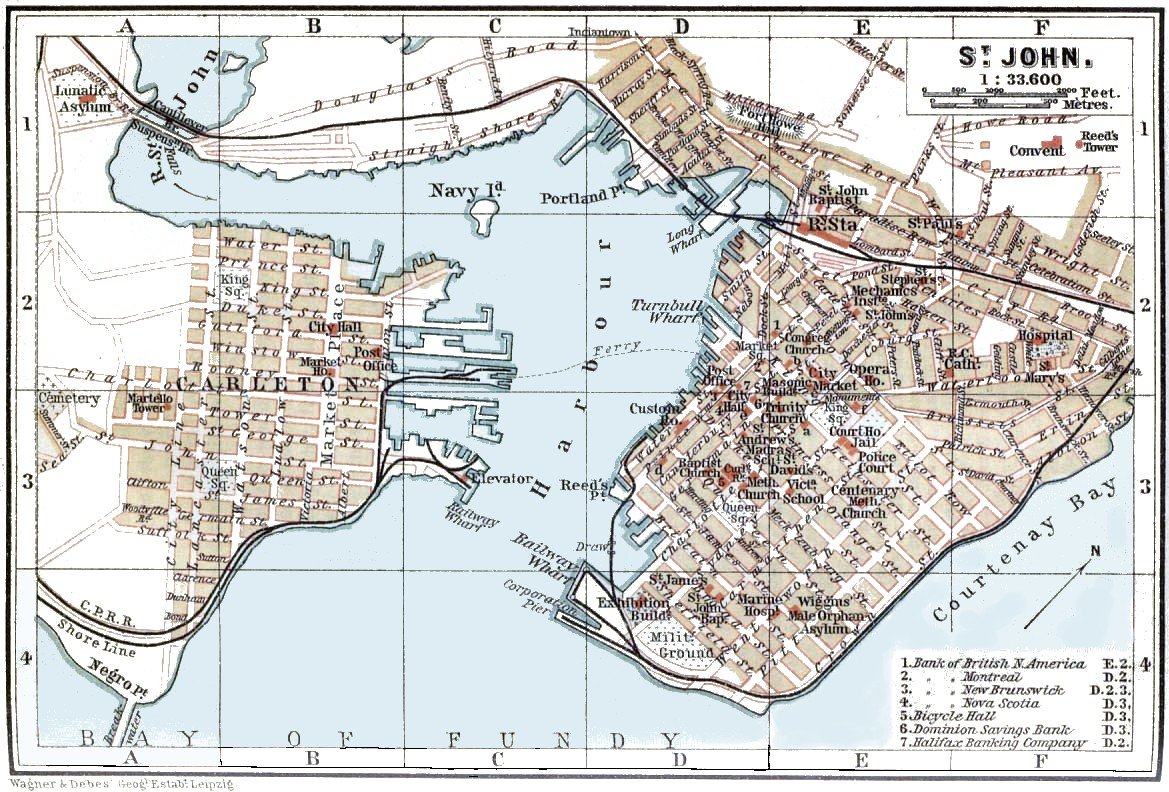
1894 map of Saint John Harbour

For many years, the Port prospered as the winter port for Montreal. In 1889 the Canadian Pacific Railway opened a line across the state of Maine from Montreal to Saint John and transferred the majority of its trans-Atlantic passenger and cargo shipping to the port during the winter months.

During the First World War, the Port of Saint John became a trans-shipment point for the British Empire's war effort. It had less importance during World War II as the navy focus had been consolidated in Halifax.

The port suffered a decline following the opening of the St. Lawrence Seaway and the introduction of icebreaker services in the Seaway in the 1960s. In 1994 CPR left Saint John when it sold the line to shortline operator New Brunswick Southern Railway. The Canadian National Railway still services Saint John with a secondary mainline from Moncton. CPR made a return in 2020 with the purchase of Central Maine and Quebec Railway that connects with Irving owner NBSR in Brownville Junction Maine.

Since being under operation by DP World, six cranes have been added to the port: two in 2017, two in 2023, and two previously used at the Port of Virginia in November 2024, which are the largest cranes the port has received to-date.

In October 2026, the federal government announced a $254 million investment as part of a $463 million project to make upgrades to the port as well as rail infrastructure.

== Port facilities ==
There are several marine facilities situated on either side of the harbour.

The west side of the harbour includes:

- the Lower West Terminal, for dry bulk and liquid bulk
- the American Iron and Metals Terminal, for dry bulk
- inter-provincial ferry terminal, operated by Bay Ferries for passenger and vehicle ferry service to Digby, Nova Scotia
- the Rodney Container Terminal, for container, dry bulk, break bulk and project cargo (operated by DP World formerly operated by Logistec Stevedoring, formerly operated by BrunTerm)
- the Navy Island Terminal, for container, dry bulk, break bulk and project cargo (formerly operated by ForTerm)

- Americold Cold Storage Facility opened in 2026 - Crosby Liquid Bulk terminal serving as both a transload facility for containerized liquid bulk, rail cars, and general liquid bulk food grade products.

The east side of the harbour includes:

- HMCS Brunswicker, a Royal Canadian Navy reserve unit
- Canadian Coast Guard Station Saint John, a search and rescue station operating the lifeboat CCGS Courtney Bay
- the Long Wharf Terminal, for dry bulk, break bulk and project cargo
- the Pugsley Terminal, for dry bulk, break bulk and project cargo
- the Marco Polo Cruise Terminal
- the Diamond Jubilee Cruise Terminal
- the Lower Cove Terminal, for dry bulk, break bulk and project cargo
- the Barrack Point Potash Terminal
- the Irving Oil Refinery Terminal, operated by Irving Oil
- the Canaport crude oil receiving terminal, handling supertankers for Irving Oil at Mispec Point, located 9 kilometres southeast of the city
- the Canaport LNG liquified natural gas receiving terminal, located adjacent to the Canaport crude oil terminal

Former facilities:

- the former Canadian Coast Guard Base Saint John property on the east side, undergoing redevelopment as Fundy Quay
- the former Saint John Shipbuilding property on the east side, currently vacant
- the former Lantic Sugar property on the east side, razed and currently vacant
- the former Intercolonial Railway grain elevator on the west side, razed and currently vacant
- the former Canadian Pacific Railway grain elevator on the west side, razed and currently vacant
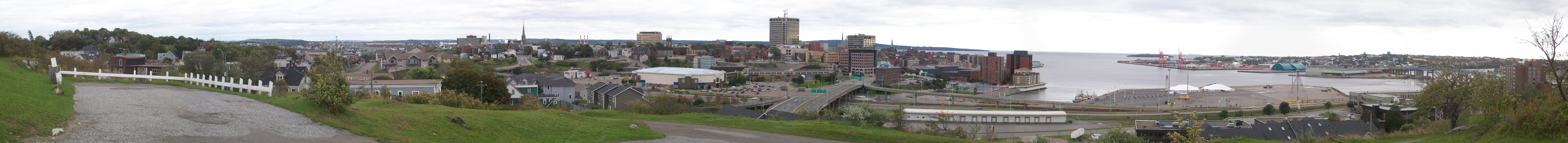
Uptown Saint John in 2008, showing its relationship to the Port of Saint John on the right prior to expansion

== See also ==
- Navy Island (Saint John)
- Port of Belledune
- Royal Kennebeccasis Yacht Club
