= Saint John Harbour =

Location in Saint John, New Brunswick, Canada

Coordinates: 47.7961°N 66.0306°W

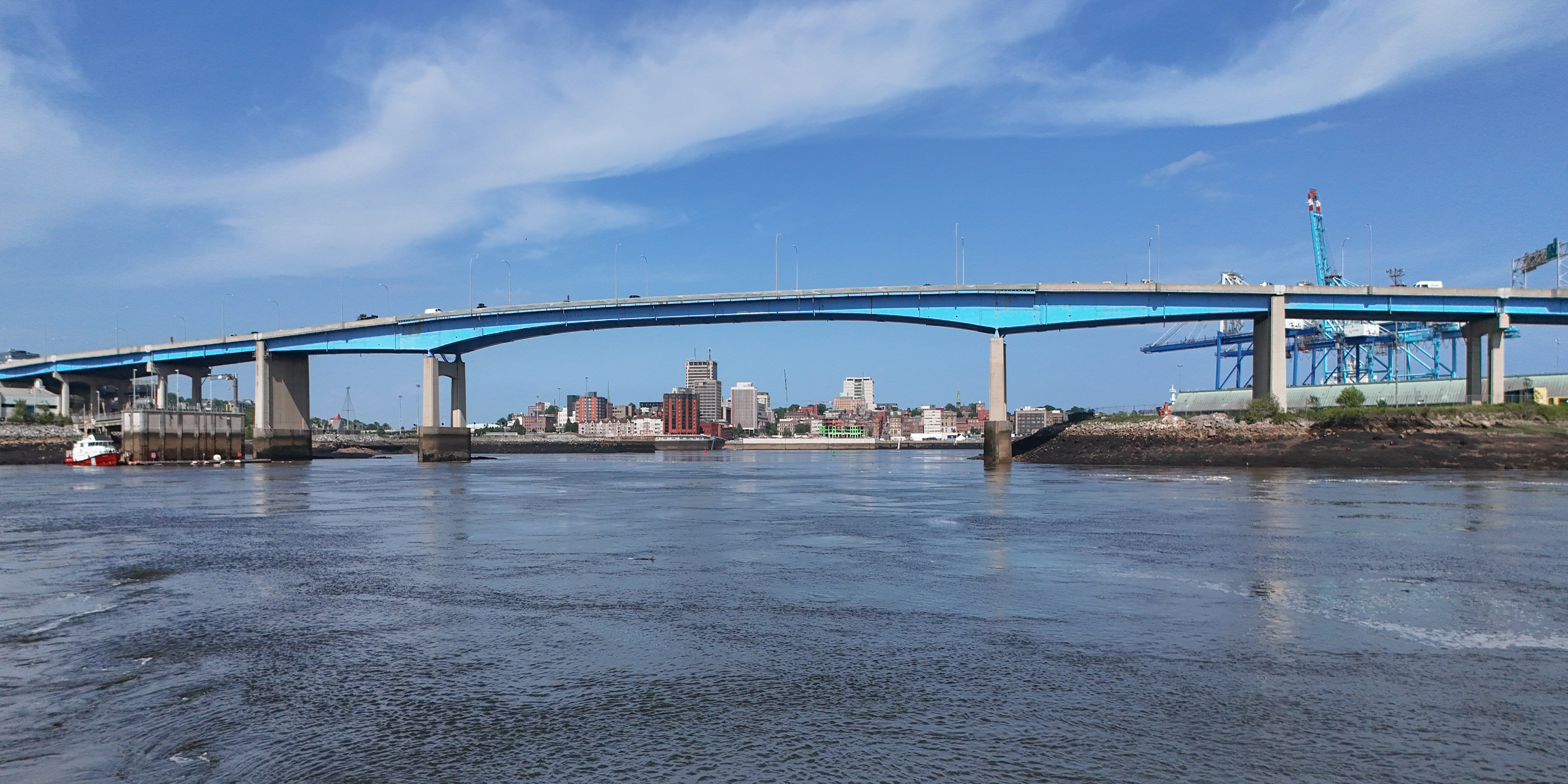
Saint John Harbour and Skyline

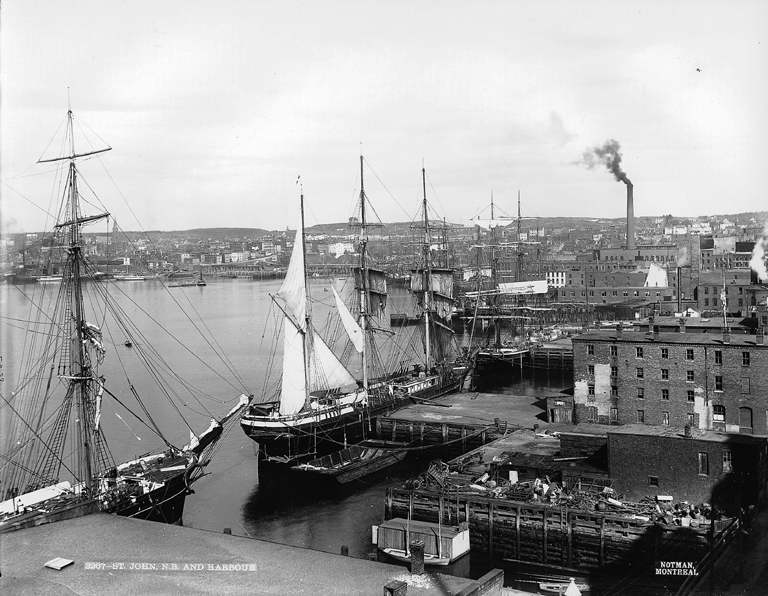
Saint John Harbour around 1898

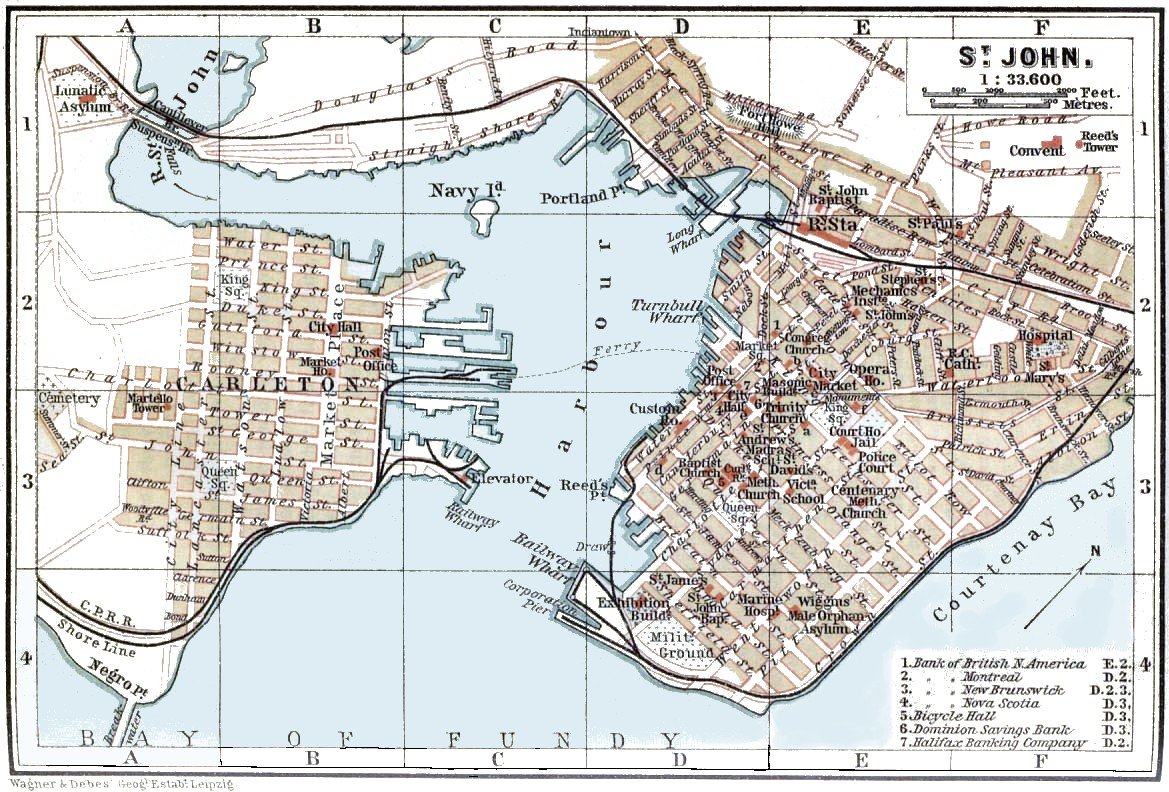
Overview Map of Saint John Harbour, 1894.

Saint John Harbour is a large natural harbour on the Atlantic coast of New Brunswick, Canada, and within the seaport city of Saint John, New Brunswick located at the mouth of the Saint John River. Opening into the Bay of Fundy, it serves as one of the most important deep-water ports on the Atlantic coast of North America. The harbour has long been central to the city’s economic and cultural identity, supporting shipbuilding, trade, fishing, and energy industries since the 18th century. It is also home to the Port of Saint John, one of Canada’s major seaports, handling a wide range of cargo and cruise ship traffic. The harbour’s unique geography, including the famous Reversing Falls where the river’s flow is affected by powerful Fundy tides, makes it a notable natural and tourist feature of the region.

== Harbour description ==
The harbour includes the following geographic areas:

- Anthonys Cove
- Hazen Creek
- Courtenay Bay
- Round Reef
- Saint John River

=== Islands ===
The harbour is home to several small islands including:

- Partridge Island
- Navy Island

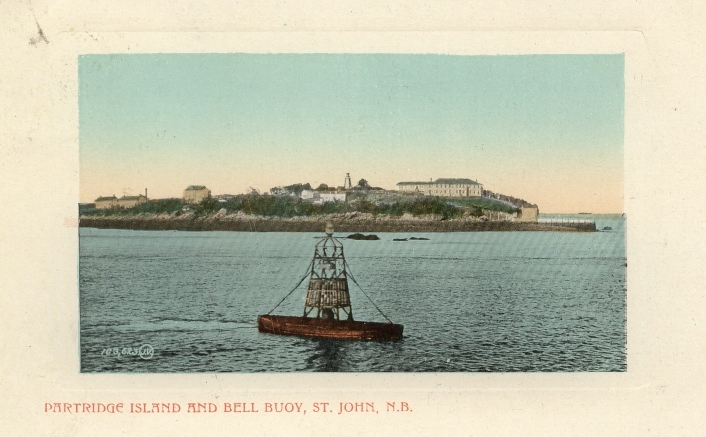
A buoy off the coast of Partridge Island, in 1905

== Navigation ==
There are two large bridges crossing The Narrows:

- the Saint John Harbour Bridge
- the Reversing Falls Bridge

== Port facilities ==
The harbour is managed by the Port of Saint John.

== Pollution and harbor cleanup ==
The Saint John, New Brunswick harbour cleanup infrastructure project brought an end to the routine release of raw sewage into Saint John's waterways. The $99 million initiative involved the finishing of a third wastewater treatment plant east in the city, and redirecting of the existing outfalls to lift and pumping stations. The initiative received full funding from the municipal, provincial and federal governments in 2008 and the project was completed in 2014.

Saint John had in the past discharged 16,000,000 L (3,500,000 imp gal; 4,200,000 US gal) of raw sewage into the Saint John Harbour and its streams on a daily basis. The practice had been ongoing in Saint John since the mid-1800s. Although Saint John was not the sole Canadian municipality to dispose wastewater that was untreated into the environment, it had been unique in that its outfalls once flowed into local streams, forming open sewers that ran through the city centre.

Guidelines suggested for Canada indicate waters with counts of higher than 200 fecal coliform bacteria per 100 ml (3.5 imp fl oz; 3.4 US fl oz) sample cannot be touched by humans (including fishing, swimming, pet swimming and wading). Post-cleanup sampling done throughout 2014 along the creek's lowest 400 m (1,300 ft) – which in the past had received the highest number of volume municipal wastewater that had not been treated – revealed a reduced amount of faecal bacteria counts between 95 and 99 percent from the year before. Although as of 2014 bacteria levels remained on average higher than the 200 counts/100 100 ml (3.5 imp fl oz; 3.4 US fl oz) guidelines for federal recreational water safety for every site that was tested, and improved water quality.

Previously, in several places, Harbour Passage walking trail in Saint John came close to outfalls that had contaminated the harbour with waste that humans could not touch. A University of New Brunswick study had also discovered the raw sewage contaminated fish in the waterways, causing handling to become a human health risk. Personal hygiene products such as condoms, tampons and toilet paper were sometimes seen on beaches and hanging from along the shoreline's vegetation. Those outfalls were decommissioned as part of the cleanup project.

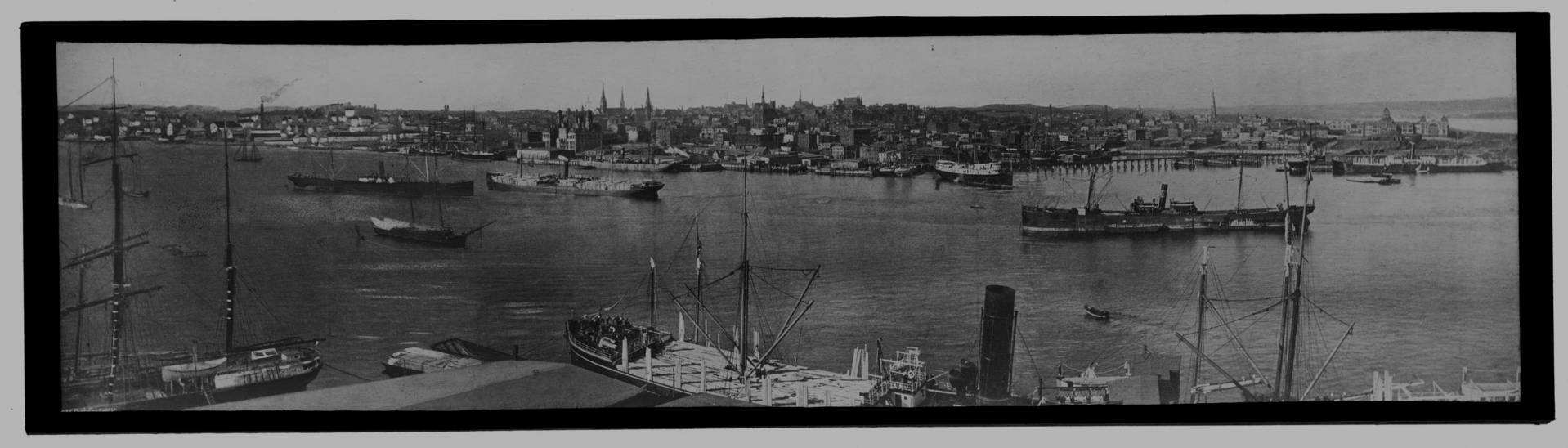
Saint John Harbour between 1895 and 1905
