= 1925 Toledo incident =

Tamakichi Ogura (left) and Ito Kawamoto (right), two of the Japanese victims, photographed in 1926

The Toledo incident of 1925 was the forced ejection of 27 Japanese, Filipino and Korean sawmill workers from the town of Toledo, Oregon, along with two Japanese wives and three children, on July 12, 1925. Twenty-two Japanese workers had just been hired to work at the mill two days before the incident, and a mob of more than 200 Toledo residents took part in their expulsion. The crowd collected several hundred dollars amongst themselves and gave it to the people they were expelling. A year later, six of the people responsible for the incident were found liable by a jury for $2,500 in civil damages and were ordered to pay court costs.

== Background and incident ==
The Pacific Spruce Corporation was having difficulty finding reliable workers for the night shifts on the green chain due to the low pay and physical demands of the job. Issei workers were brought in to work at the Toledo sawmill on July 10, 1925, to address this problem. Although sawmill employees (and, after initial reluctance, Toledo businessmen) largely supported the plan, such locals as the chief of police and several business owners opposed the employment of Asian and Black workers in the town and formed an organization to lobby against it.

The twenty-two Japanese workers, their two wives and three Japanese-American children were forced out, along with the four Filipino workers and a Korean worker, by a mob of over 200 Toledo residents on July 12, 1925. A newspaper reported that 35 people had been forced to quit working at the sawmill. The crowd collected several hundred dollars amongst themselves and gave it to the workers they were ejecting. The workers and their families were transported away in trucks and cars by the townsfolk. They were reported to have been taken to Corvallis and given tickets to proceed onwards by train to Portland, where they were received and cared for by the local Asian community.

Five men (Charles A. Buck, W. S. Colvin, Harry T. Pritchard, Martin Germer, and James Stewart) were arrested the next day. They were released on bond the same day, although the local district attorney (with support from the company's attorney) said the leaders of the riot would be fully prosecuted.

The Japanese consul in Portland requested a formal investigation by the state, and Governor Walter M. Pierce sent a secretary and the state's commissioner of labor to investigate the situation and prepare a report. It was reported that every effort was being made to avoid similar incidents and that the situation would probably blow over without further trouble in Toledo or a spreading of the unrest to other mill towns. Following the incident, the sawmill was employing only White men, and the local population was so hostile to the Japanese community that the governor's secretary said he thought no Japanese people would be willing to try to go there. A representative of the state's chamber of commerce called the incident "a tempest in a teapot" and said his only concern was whether the incident would discourage further immigration of settlers into the state.

== Trial ==
Eight men (Martin H. Germer, Charles A. Buch, L. D. Emerson, W. S. Colvin, Harry T. Pritchard, Frank Sturdevant, Owen Hart and George R. Schenck) and one woman (Rosemary Schenck) were targeted in civil lawsuits by Tamakichi Ogura, one of the Pacific Spruce Company workers who had been forced out. The trial began on July 12, 1926 under judge Charles E. Wolverton. Germer, Buch and Emerson disappeared and could not be served with summonses for the trial. A unanimous verdict was reached on July 23, 1926, and found the defendants liable for civil damages.

The defendants were found liable for $2,500 in damages to Mr. Ogura (equivalent to $45,000 in 2025), plus courtroom fees. A settlement was reached on October 1, 1926, with the defendants agreeing to pay the awarded sum and to allow the Japanese workers to return to Toledo without harassment (if they chose to do so) in exchange for dropping the four remaining pending lawsuits.
