= Navy Island (Saint John) =

Coordinates: 45°16′3.24″N 66°4′22.44″W

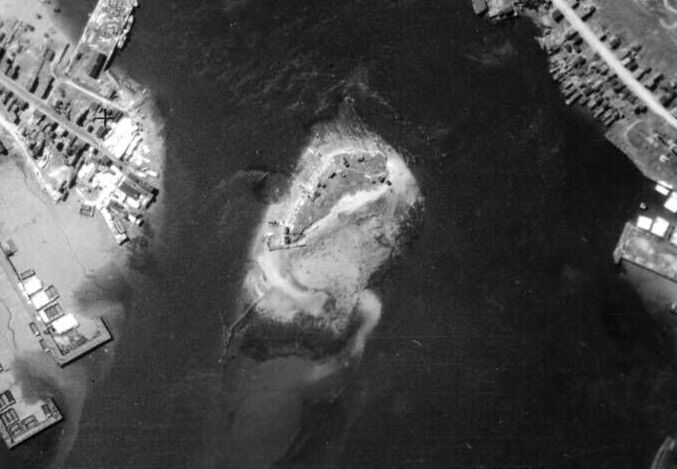
Aerial photo of Navy Island

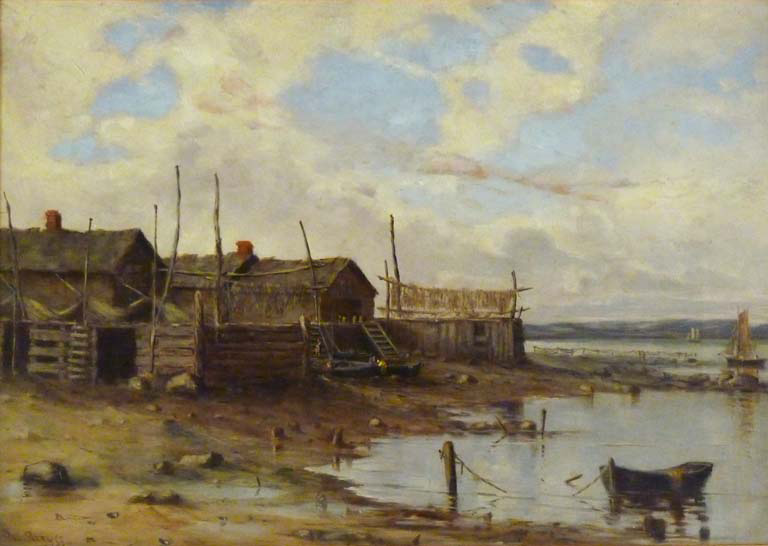
1888 painting of Navy Island

Navy Island was a small island situated within the Inner Harbour of Saint John, New Brunswick in Canada. For centuries, Navy Island existed as a narrow, oval shaped hunk of rock sitting roughly at the turning point of the harbour where the deep open water ends and the harbour approaches the Reversing Falls. However, the island ceased to exist in its traditional form when the construction of the Saint John Harbour Bridge linked the island to the mainland in the 1970s. The island now sits under the western footing of the bridge, and is survived in name by the Navy Island Forest Products Terminal, operated by DP World Port of Saint John since 1979. When Samuel de Champlain visited Saint John in 1604, the island was the location of a native Wolastoqey settlement named Ouigoudi. A historical market detailing the island’s history can be found at the foot of Bentley Street at Chesley Drive.

== See also ==
- Saint John, New Brunswick
- List of communities in New Brunswick
- List of islands of New Brunswick
