= American Association of Port Authorities =

The American Association of Port Authorities (AAPA) is a trade association founded in 1912 that represents 150 port authorities in the Western Hemisphere, including the United States, Canada, the Caribbean, and Latin America.

Headquartered in Washington, D.C., AAPA protects and advances the common interests of its diverse member organizations as they connect their communities with the global transportation system. Member ports vary in size, cargo and vessel types handled, operating structure, and geographic service area.

According to AAPA, America's ports are gateways to the world and a critical component in economic health and national defense. On average, each of the 50 states relies on 13 to 15 ports to handle its imports and exports, which add up to over $5.5 billion worth of goods moving in and out of U.S. ports every day.

The association has four main goals:

- Advocate governmental policies that strengthen and expand opportunities for member ports
- Advance professionalism in all facets of port management and operations
- Promote information sharing and relationship-building opportunities for all members
- Achieve greater understanding of the essential role and economic value of ports

== Key issues ==
One key issue that AAPA focuses on is the reorganization of the Harbor Maintenance Trust Fund (HMTF). AAPA hopes that the fund can be applied in a way that fully benefits ports and their surrounding communities. Since the creation of the fund in 1986, HMTF tax revenue has been used by the government to fund projects unrelated to port development. AAPA believes that the funding should go directly to ports in order to complete maintenance dredging. Regular maintenance dredging is crucial to most navigable waterways, harbors, and ports. Each year, several hundred feet of sand, gravel, and silt must be removed from waterways and harbors to maintain navigability -- enough for a four-lane highway four feet deep stretching between New York City and Los Angeles, California, according to the U.S. Army Corps of Engineers.

AAPA also supports the U.S. Department of Transportation's National Freight Policy framework, which focuses on increasing public and private investment in freight infrastructure through tax incentives. It also seeks to improve public and private collaboration on freight-related issues by increasing public-sector awareness about trends in private-sector freight operations and investment.

In March 2020, due to a COVID-19-related decrease in traffic and revenue, the AAPA sought $6.5 billion in financial support from the federal government.
