= List of rivers that have reversed direction =

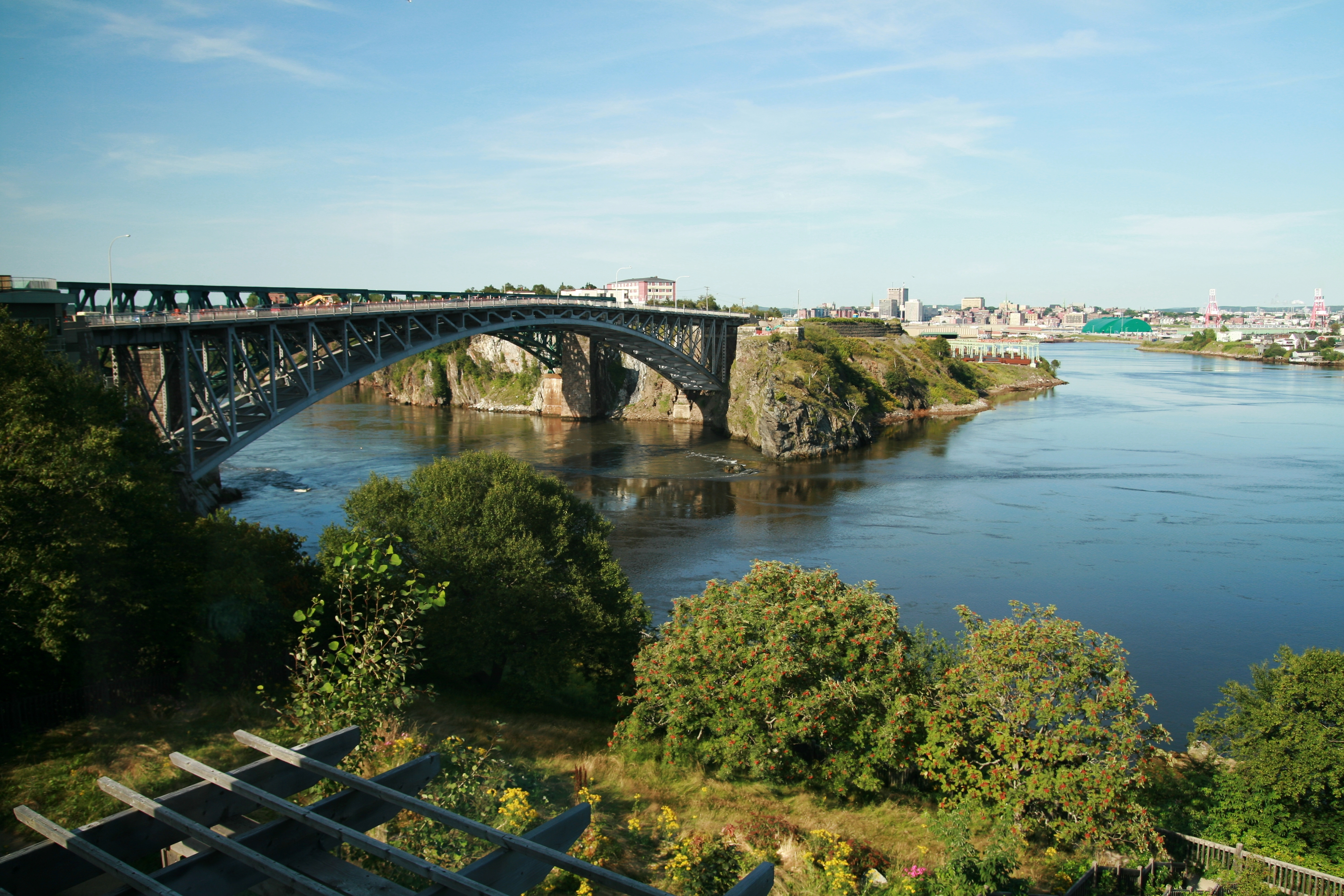
Reversing Falls of Saint John River

A number of rivers are known to have reversed the direction of their flow, either permanently or temporarily, in response to geological activity, weather events, climate change, tides, or direct human intervention.

== Permanent reversals ==
=== Natural ===
River	Original outlet	Current outlet	Continent	Date of reversal	Cause of reversal	References
Amazon River	Pacific Ocean	Atlantic Ocean	South America	Cretaceous period	Formation of Andes Mountains	
Wisconsin River	Great Lakes Basin	Mississippi River	North America	Pleistocene Epoch	Pre-Illinoian glaciers	

=== Artificial ===
River	Original outlet	Current outlet	Continent	Date of reversal	Cause of reversal	References
Chicago River	Lake Michigan	Mississippi River	North America	1900	Construction of Chicago Sanitary and Ship Canal	

== Temporary reversals ==
=== Daily ===
All tidal sections of rivers reverse their flow with the tide about twice a day (or semidiurnally), by definition. The following are notable examples.

River	Outlet	Continent	References
Hudson River	Upper New York Bay	North America	
Saint John River (Reversing Falls)	Bay of Fundy	North America	
Salmon River	Bay of Fundy	North America	
Channel of Vivari	Straits of Corfu	Europe	

=== Annual ===
River	Outlet	Continent	Cause of reversal	References
Krupa River	Neretva River	Europe	High water levels of the Neretva River	
Petexbatún River	Pasión River	Central America	Winter rain flooding of the Pasión River	
Qiantang River	Hangzhou Bay	Asia	Tidal bore in Hangzhou Bay	
Tonlé Sap River	Mekong River	Asia	Monsoon flooding of the Mekong River	

=== Intermittent ===
Hurricane storm surges often cause temporary reversals of coastal rivers.

River	Outlet	Continent	Date of reversal	Cause of reversal	References
Chicago River (Note: These reversals represent a return to the Chicago River's original natural outlet in Lake Michigan.)	Mississippi River	North America	2017 and others (Note: Reversals of the Chicago River have been increasing in frequency in association with global warming, and may soon occur at least once each year.)	Storm surge	
Mississippi River	Gulf of Mexico	North America	1812	Tectonic uplift caused by New Madrid earthquakes	
Mississippi River	Gulf of Mexico	North America	2005	Storm surge from Hurricane Katrina	
Mississippi River	Gulf of Mexico	North America	2012	Storm surge from Hurricane Isaac	
Mississippi River	Gulf of Mexico	North America	2021	Storm surge from Hurricane Ida	

== See also ==
- Stream capture, in which a stream or river is diverted from its own bed, and flows instead down a neighboring channel
