= Toledo High School (Oregon) =

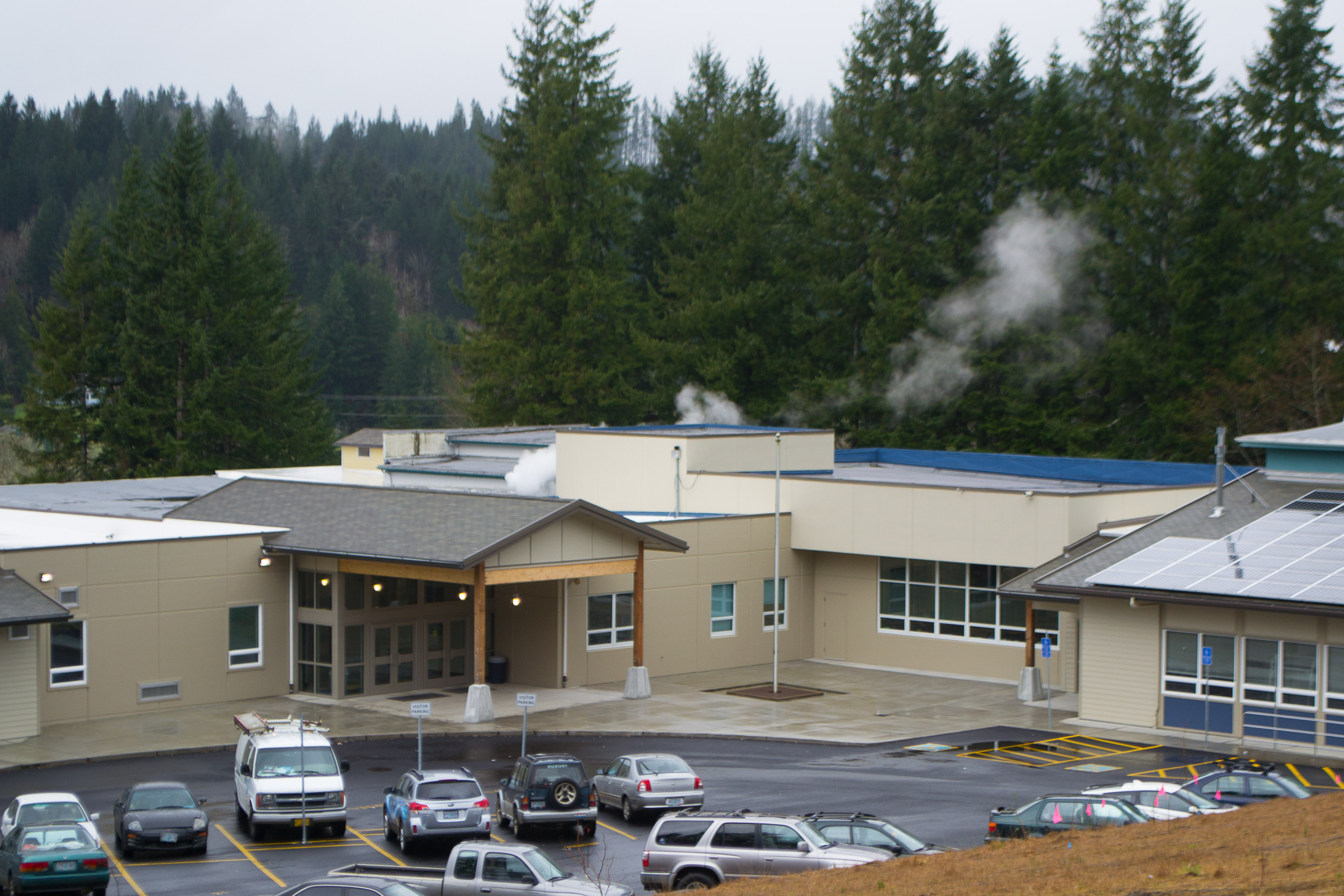

Location
- 1800 NE Sturdevant Road; Toledo, (Lincoln County), Oregon 97391; United States; 44.633622°N 123.921645°W

Information
- Type: Public
- Opened: 1959
- School district: Lincoln County School District
- Principal: Clint Raever
- Grades: 7-12
- Enrollment: 168 (2023-2024)
- Colors: Blue and gold
- Athletics conference: OSAA Tri-River Conference 2A-3
- Mascot: Boomer
- Website: Toledo HS website

Toledo High School, also known as Toledo Junior/Senior High School, is a public high school in Toledo, Oregon, United States.

== Academics ==
In 2008, 73% of the school's seniors received a high school diploma. Of 100 students, 73 graduated, 17 dropped out, four received a modified diploma, and six remained in high school in 2009.
