= Port authority =

Type of organization responsible for ports

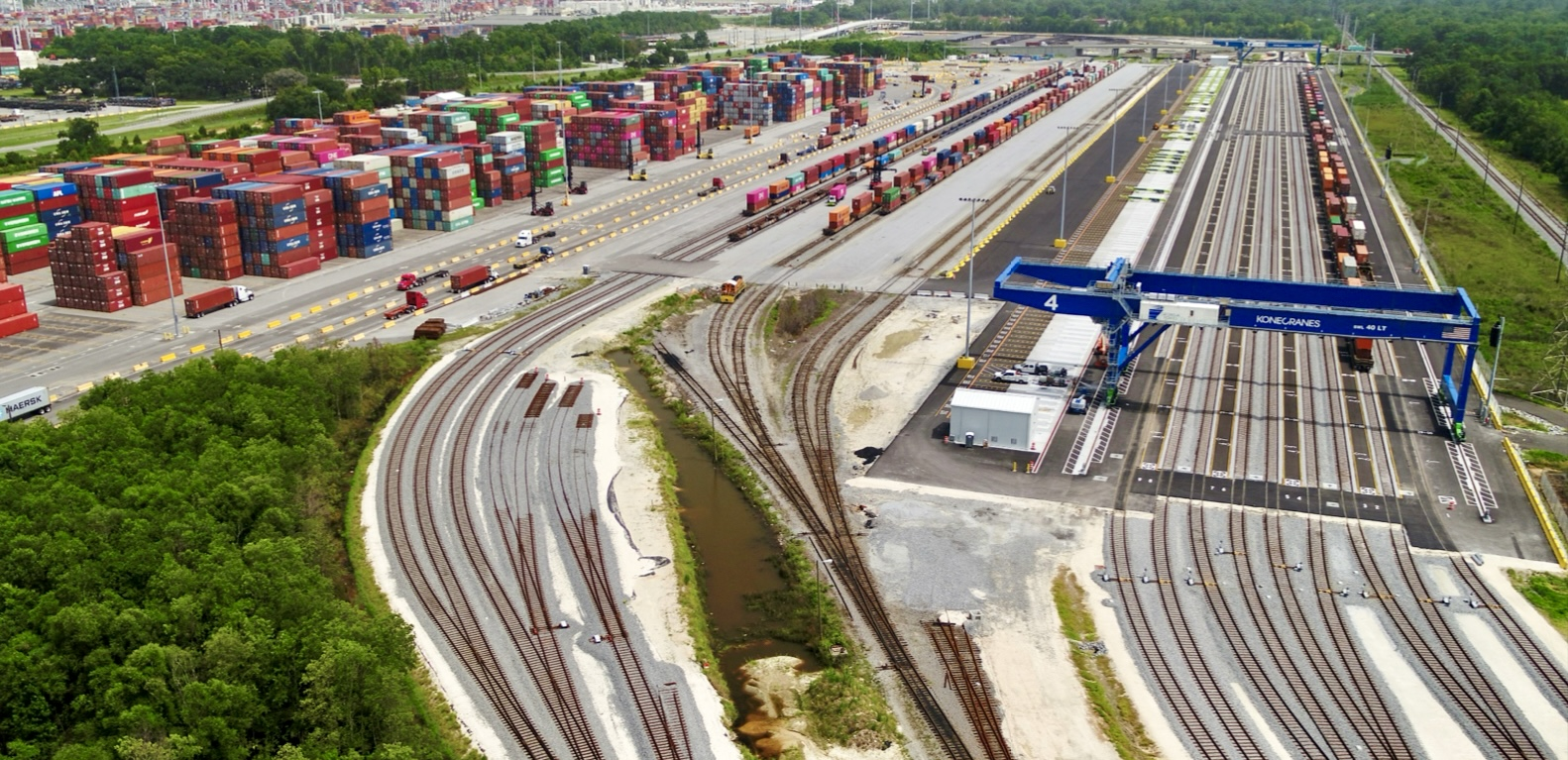
Georgia Ports Authority intermodal terminal at the Port of Savannah

A port authority (less commonly a port district) is a governmental or quasi-governmental public authority for a special-purpose district usually formed by a legislative body (or bodies) to operate ports and other transportation infrastructure. In Canada, the federal minister of transport selects the local chief executive board member and the rest of the board is appointed at the recommendation of port users to the federal minister; while all Canadian port authorities have a federal or Crown charter called letters patent.

Numerous Caribbean nations have port authorities, including those of Aruba, British Virgin Islands, Bahamas, Jamaica, Cayman Islands, Trinidad and Tobago, St. Lucia, St. Maarten, St. Vincent and the Grenadines.

Central and South America also have port agencies such as autoridad and consorcio (authority and consortium).

In Mexico, the federal government created sixteen port administrations in 1994–1995 called Administración Portuaria Integral (Integral Port Administration) in Spanish, as result of the Ley de Puertos (Port Law) of 1993. These are organized as variable capital corporations (Sociedad Anónima de Capital Variable), with the intent of creating more private investment in a state owned sector.

Port authorities are usually governed by boards or commissions, which are commonly appointed by governmental chief executives, often from different jurisdictions.

Most port authorities are financially self-supporting. In addition to owning land, setting fees, and sometimes levying taxes, port districts can also operate shipping terminals, airports, railroads, and irrigation facilities.

== Port authorities and districts ==
The distinction between inland and being marine is occasionally open to discussion. No distinction is made here between river and Great Lakes ports.

=== Canada ===
The minister of transport is ultimately responsible for his patronage of Canadian port authorities, a useful map of which is electronically available at Transport Canada.

==== Port authorities ====
With date of letters patent.

Atlantic

- Belledune, 29 March 2000
- Halifax, 1 March 1999
- Saint John, 1 May 1999
- Sept-Îles, 1 May 1999
- St. John's, NL, 1 May 1999

Great Lakes

- Hamilton, 1 May 2001
- Oshawa, 10 February 2012
- Thunder Bay, 1 July 1999
- Toronto, 8 June 1999
- Windsor, 1 July 1999

Pacific

- Fraser River, 1 May 1999
- Nanaimo, 1 July 1999
- North Fraser, 1 July 1999
- Port Alberni, 1 July 1999
- Port Metro Vancouver, 1 January 2008
- Prince Rupert, 1 May 1999
- Vancouver, 1 March 1999

St. Lawrence Seaway

- Montréal, 1 March 1999
- Québec, 1 May 1999
- Saguenay, 1 May 1999
- Trois Rivières, 1 May 1999

==== Other agencies ====
- Transport Canada
- St. Lawrence Seaway Management Corporation
- Canada Ports Corporation

==== Former agency ====
- National Harbours Board

=== United States ===
Charter date in parentheses.

Atlantic

- Albany Port District Commission (1925)
- Bridgeport Port Authority, CT (1992)
- Canaveral Port Authority, FL (1939)
- City of Richmond Port Commission, VA (1982)
- Chesapeake Port Authority, MD and VA (1987)
- Connecticut Port Authority (2014)
- Dade County Seaport Department, Miami, FL (1960)
- Delaware River Port Authority, NJ and PA (1951)
- Diamond State Port Corporation/Port of Wilmington, DE (1994)
- Eastport Port Authority, ME (1977)
- Port Everglades, FL (1927)
- Georgia Ports Authority (1945)
- Jacksonville Port Authority (1963)
- Port of Miami
- Maine Port Authority
- Maryland Port Administration (1971)
- Massachusetts Port Authority (1956)
- New Hampshire State Port Authority (1957)
- Port Authority of New York and New Jersey (1921)
- North Carolina State Ports Authority (1945)
- Port of Palm Beach District (1915)
- Philadelphia Regional Port Authority, PA (1989)
- Port of Fernandina (1807) OHPA (1985)
- Port of Ponce, PR (1911)
- Puerto Rico Ports Authority (1942)
- Putnam County Port Authority, FL (1967)
- South Carolina State Ports Authority (1942)
- South Jersey Port Corporation, NJ (1968)
- Virgin Islands Port Authority, VI (1969)
- Virginia Port Authority, VA (1970)
- Westover Metropolitan Development Corporation (1974)

Gulf of Mexico

- Alabama State Port Authority, (2000)
- Port of Beaumont Navigation District of Jefferson County, TX (1949)
- Greater Baton Rouge Port Commission, LA (1952)
- Port Freeport (FKA, Brazos River Harbor Navigation District),) Freeport, TX (1927)
- Brownsville Navigation District (1925)
- Calhoun County Navigation District, Port Lavaca/Point Comfort, TX (1953)
- Port of Corpus Christi Authority (1926)
- Port of Galveston (1825)
- Port of Houston Authority (1910)
- Jackson County Port Authority, Pascagoula, MS (1956)
- Lake Charles Port Harbor & Terminal District, LA (1924)
- Manatee County Port Authority, FL (1967)
- Mississippi State Port Authority/Gulfport (1960)
- Orange County Navigation Port District, TX (1953)
- Board of Commissioners of the New Orleans, LA (1896)
- Port of Pensacola, FL (1976)
- Harbor & Terminal District Plaquemines Port, LA (1977)
- Panama City Port Authority, FL (1979)
- Port of Port Arthur Navigation District, TX (1963)
- Port Isabel-San Benito Navigation District, TX (1928)
- South Louisiana Port Commission, (1968)
- Harbor & Terminal District St. Bernard Port Harbor, LA (1981)
- Tampa Port Authority, FL (1945)

Great Lakes / St. Lawrence Seaway

- City of Auburn Port Authority, Auburn, Indiana
- Brown County Board of Harbor Commissioners, Green Bay, WI (1965)
- Port of Cleveland, Cleveland, Ohio
- Detroit/Wayne County Port Authority (1978)
- Duluth Seaway Port Authority, MN (1929)
- Erie-Western Pennsylvania Port Authority (1962)
- Fairfield County Port Authority, OH (2014)
- Illinois International Port District, Chicago (1955)
- Indiana Port Commission (1961)
- Lorain Port Authority, OH (1964)
- Port of Milwaukee
- Niagara Frontier Transportation Authority, Buffalo (1967)
- Ogdensburg Bridge and Port Authority, NY
- Port of Pittsburgh Commission, Pittsburgh, PA (1992)
- Port of Oswego Authority, NY (1955)
- Port of Stockton (1932)
- Toledo-Lucas County Port Authority (1955)
- Waukegan Port District (1955)

Pacific

- Port of Alsea, OR (1910)
- Port of Anacortes, WA (1926)
- Anchorage Port Commission, AK (1946)
- Port of Arlington, OR (1933)
- Port of Astoria, OR (1910)
- Port of Bandon, OR (1913)
- Port of Bellingham, WA (1920)
- Port of Brookings Harbor, OR (1956)
- Port of Cascade Locks, OR (1937)
- Port of Columbia County, OR (1941)
- Port of Coos Bay, OR (1909)
- Port of Coquille River, OR (1912)
- Port of Everett, WA (1917)
- Port of Garibaldi, OR (1910)
- Port of Gold Beach, OR (1955)
- Port of Grays Harbor, WA (1911)
- Port Authority of Guam (1975)
- Port of Hood River, OR (1933)
- Humboldt Bay Harbor Recreation & Conservation District, CA (1970)
- Long Beach City Harbor Department, CA (1909)
- Port of Longview, WA (1921)
- Los Angeles City Harbor Department, CA (1907)
- Port of Morrow, OR (1958)
- Port of Nehalem, OR (1909)
- Port of Newport, OR (1964)
- Port of Oakland, CA (1926)
- Port of Olympia, WA (1922)
- Oxnard Harbor District, Hueneme, CA (1937)
- Port of Kalama, WA (1921)
- Port of Longview, WA (1922)
- Port of Port Angeles, WA (1923)
- Port of Port Orford, OR (1919)
- Port of Portland, OR (1891)
- Port of Redwood City, CA (1937)
- Port of Richmond, CA (1982)
- Commonwealth Ports Authority of Saipan, MP (1981)
- Port of Sacramento, CA (1947)
- Port of San Diego, CA (1962)
- San Francisco Port Commission, CA (1969)
- Port of Seattle, WA (1911)
- Port of Siuslaw, OR (1909)
- Port of Skamania County, WA (1964)
- Port of Tacoma, WA (1918)
- Port of The Dalles, OR (1933)
- Port of Tillamook Bay, OR (1953)
- Port of Toledo, OR (1910)
- Port of Umatilla, OR (1940)
- Port of Umpqua, OR (1913)
- Port of Vancouver, WA (1912)

Inland Rivers

- Port of Pittsburgh (1992)
- Port of Greater Cincinnati (2000)
- Perry County Port Authority (1991)
- Paducah-McCracken County Riverport Authority, KY (1964)

== Mexico ==
Listed from northwest to southeast. API stands for Administración Portuaria Integral (Integral Port Administration).

Pacific

- API de Ensenada
- API de Guaymas
- API de Topolobampo
- API de Mazatlán
- API de Puerto Vallarta
- API de Manzanillo
- API de Lázaro Cárdenas, Michoacan
- API de Salina Cruz
- API de Puerto Madero (Puerto Chiapas)

Gulf of Mexico

- API de Altamira
- API de Tampico
- API de Túxpan
- API de Veracruz
- API de Coatzacoalcos
- API de Campeche
- API de Dos Bocas
- API de Progreso
- API de Quintana Roo

== Caribbean ==
- Port Authority of Jamaica, Jamaica
- Barbados Port Authority, Barbados
- Grand Bahama Port Authority, The Bahamas
- Puerto Rico Ports Authority

== Central America ==
- Autoridad Marítima de Panamá
- Comisión Portuaria Nacional, Guatemala
- Dirección General de Puertos Empresa Nacional Portuaria, Honduras
- JAPDEVA – Atlantic Port Authority, Costa Rica

== Middle East ==
- Israel Port Authority
- General Organization of Sea Ports, Bahrain
- Saudi Ports Authority, Kingdom of Saudi Arabia
- General Authority for Land and Sea Ports, Syria

== Asia Pacific ==
- Bintulu Port Authority
- Busan Port Authority
- Gwadar Port Authority
- Indonesia Port Corporations
- Port of Kitakyūshū
- Port of Niihama
- Port of Shanghai
- Port of Singapore
- Port Qasim Authority
- Sri Lanka Ports Authority
- Sydney Harbour Foreshore Authority
- Taiwan International Ports Corporation

== Europe ==
=== United Kingdom ===
In the United Kingdom operators of ports and harbours become de facto port authorities under several pieces of legislation. Examples include the:

- Mersey Docks and Harbour Company
- Port of London Authority

== See also ==
- Airport authority
- American Association of Port Authorities
- List of North American ports
- International Association of Ports and Harbours
- List of ports and terminal infrastructure types
- Trust port
