= National Harbours Board =

The National Harbours Board was an agency of the Government of Canada, reporting to Parliament through the Minister of Transport. It was in operation from 1936 to 1983.

== History ==
The idea of a system of national ports was mooted as early as 1905, when it was first recommended in a report by the Royal Commission of Transportation. Although not acted upon at the time, the idea gained more acceptability over time, and the later National Ports Survey by Sir Alexander Gibb in 1932 laid the groundwork for its eventual establishment.

The Board was established in 1936, The public harbours at Halifax, Saint John, Chicoutimi, Quebec, Trois-Rivières, Montreal and Vancouver, previously constituted as separate bodies corporate, were dissolved and their property vested in the Board, and provision was made for the possibility of other "harbours and works and other property of the Dominion of Canada" to be transferred to the Board at a later date.

In 1983 it was replaced by the Canada Ports Corporation. This devolved much of the National Harbour Board's former functions to local port authorities maintaining responsibility for ensuring that overall national transportation objectives are met, as well as overseeing the Ports Canada Police until that service was disbanded in 1997.

== See also ==
- List of largest container shipping companies
