= Port of Pittsburgh =

Inland port in Pennsylvania, USA

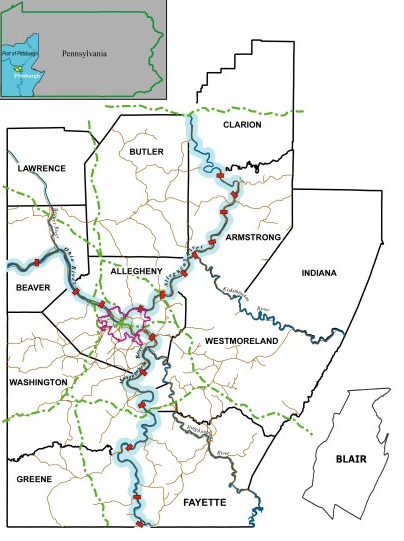
Map shows general area of the Pittsburgh port region.

The Port of Pittsburgh is a vast river traffic region in southwestern Pennsylvania. It spans a thirteen-county area including Allegheny, Armstrong, Beaver, Blair, Butler, Cambria, Clarion, Fayette, Greene, Indiana, Lawrence, Washington, and Westmoreland Counties.

It encompasses more than 200 miles of commercially navigable waterways in southwestern Pennsylvania, including the three major rivers in this region: the Allegheny, the Monongahela, and the Ohio. These waterways are made navigable by a system of seventeen locks and dams. The Port of Pittsburgh supports nearly 200 river terminals and barge industry service suppliers, including privately owned public river terminals. The port complex is served by the CSX and Norfolk Southern railroads and by four interstate highways. The Port of Pittsburgh Commission acts as a comprehensive service for shippers and industries seeking information on the river system.

Unlike the Port of Miami, for example, the Port of Pittsburgh does not refer to a specific geographic location but to the broader geographical context under which the Pittsburgh port industry conducts its broad scope of activity.

== Port of Pittsburgh Commission ==
Port of Pittsburgh Commission

Agency overview
- Formed: 1992
- Motto: Good things flow from here.
- Agency executive: Mary Ann Bucci, Executive Director
- Parent agency: Commonwealth of Pennsylvania
- Website: https://www.portpitt.com/

The Port of Pittsburgh Commission is a government agency of the Commonwealth of Pennsylvania that manages the Port of Pittsburgh, which is the second-largest inland port in the United States.

Pittsburgh's port ranks as the 26th largest port in the United States overall, with almost 27 million short tons of river cargo for 2015. The port ranked 15th largest in the U.S. when measured in domestic trade.

=== M-70 ===
The commission has responsibility for Ohio River shipping within Pennsylvania and the navigable portions of the Allegheny River and the Monongahela River. In 2010, the federal Maritime Administration designated the Ohio River as part of a federal marine highway, called M-70, with the name taken from I-70, a major highway used by trucks in the region.

== See also ==
- Port of Philadelphia
