= Canada Ports Corporation =

Canadian port corporation

The Canada Ports Corporation (also known as Ports Canada) was a port corporation which operated across Canada. An Act of Parliament, which had been promoted by Jean-Luc Pépin, founded it on 24 February 1983, and it was marked as a responsibility of the Minister of Transport. Additionally, Pépin enunciated the Harbour Commissions Act, under which a new National Ports Policy was launched. The Canada Ports Corporation was phased out in 1998 with the creation of the Canada Marine Act (CMA), an act ostensibly to modernize Canada's ports and harbors; prior to the implementation of the CMA, a National Marine Policy had been written in 1995 under the Ministry of Doug Young.

== History ==
The reorganization of the National Harbours Board (which had operated since 1936) was instigated by Minister of Transport Jean-Luc Pepin, and in February 1983 resulted, with the passage of the Canada Ports Corporation Act, in the creation of an agency named Ports Canada.

In 1998, the Canada Marine Act was passed, which gave port control to 18 Canada Port Authorities. Throughout its operating years the governing body oversaw 15 ports.

== Ports Canada Police ==
The Ports Canada Police was a law enforcement agency operated under the Canada Ports Corporation. In November 1998, the Ports Canada Police was the object of scrutiny after allegations of obstruction of justice were presented to the Royal Canadian Mounted Police.

== Other Resources ==
Transport Canada - List of Canadian Port Authorities
