= Reversing Falls =

Series of rapids on the Saint John River in Canada

Coordinates: 45°15′37″N 66°05′24″W

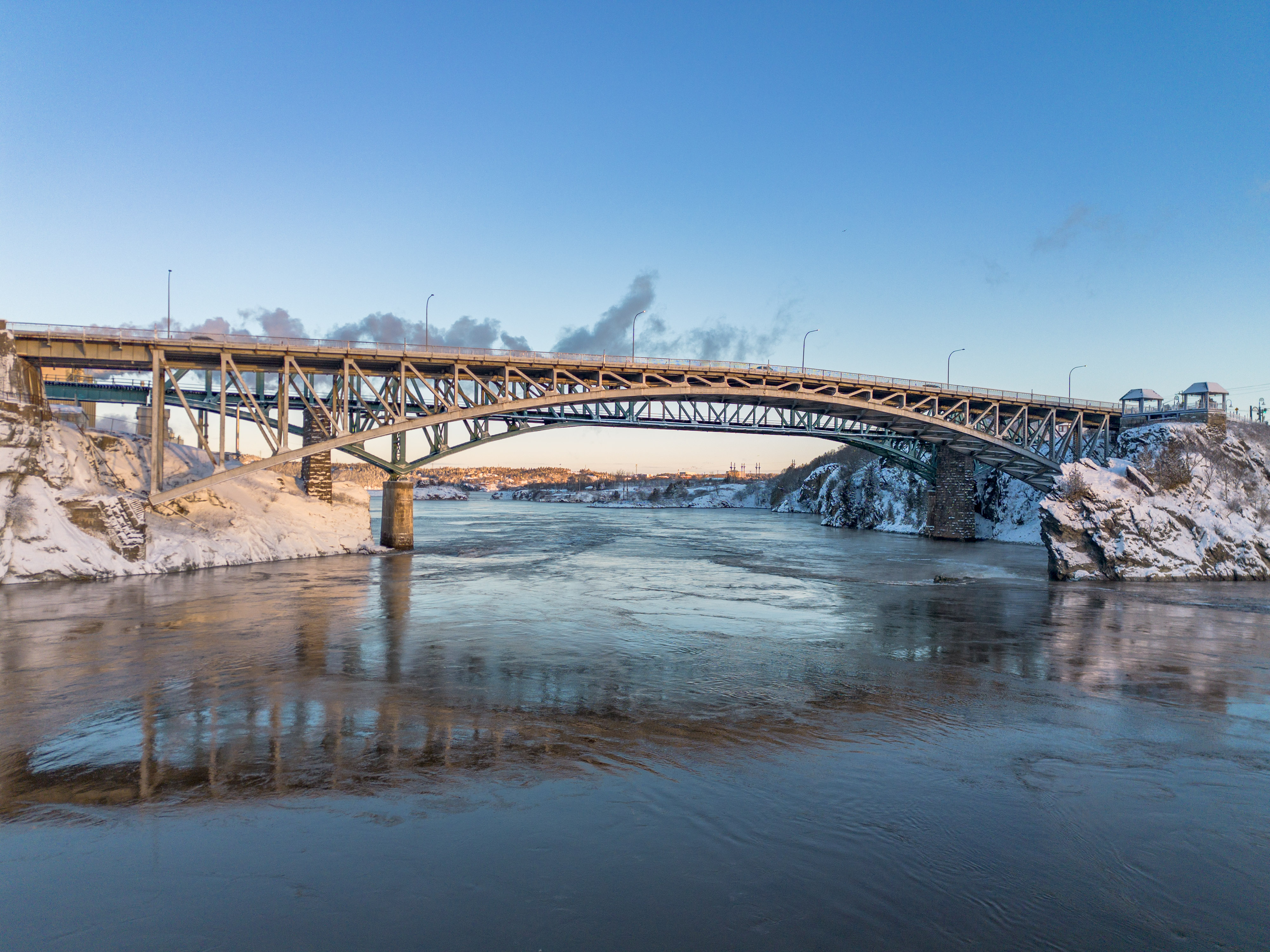
- Reversing Falls in 2026
- Interactive map of Reversing Falls
- Location: Saint John, New Brunswick, Canada
- Type: Tidal rapids
- Watercourse: Saint John River

The Reversing Falls are a series of rapids on the Saint John River, located in Saint John, New Brunswick, Canada, where the river runs through a narrow gorge before emptying into the Bay of Fundy.

The semi-diurnal tides of the bay force the flow of water to reverse against the prevailing current when the tide is high. However, during the spring freshet, this reversal is often surpassed by the downstream volume of water. The rapids, or "falls,” are created by a series of underwater ledges which roil the water in either direction, causing a significant navigation hazard, despite the water's depth. As a result, vessels wishing to enter or exit from the river must wait for slack tide.

The Reversing Falls have also been an important industrial site for over a century. The Canadian Pacific Railway constructed the Reversing Falls Railway Bridge in 1885 and this structure was replaced in 1922; it is currently used by the New Brunswick Southern Railway. The railway bridge crosses the gorge immediately downstream from the falls, parallel to the Reversing Falls Road Bridge.

The location of the falls was once home to a foundry and other light industrial operations on the east side of the gorge, while a large pulp mill lies on the west side. J.D. Irving, the company which has operated the pulp mill since purchasing it in the late 1940s, has faced criticism in recent decades for maintaining the facility at what is viewed as one of Saint John's prime tourism locations. This criticism became most pronounced during the 1980s and 1990s when the city government developed Fallsview Park on the former industrial foundry lands on the east side of the gorge.

During the late 1990s, a tourist business was established, offering jet boat rides on the river in the vicinity of the falls; however, the boats did not operate in the roughest areas, which experience a significant drop in water level over a very short distance. The business closed at the end of the 2013 season after 19 years. The operators typically stayed in the choppy waters immediately downstream and attempted to soak passengers by driving through small whirlpools at the base of the railway bridge. Another more recent development at the Reversing Falls has been its growing use as a whitewater kayaking location, made unique by the changes in the formation of the rapids during incoming or outgoing tides.

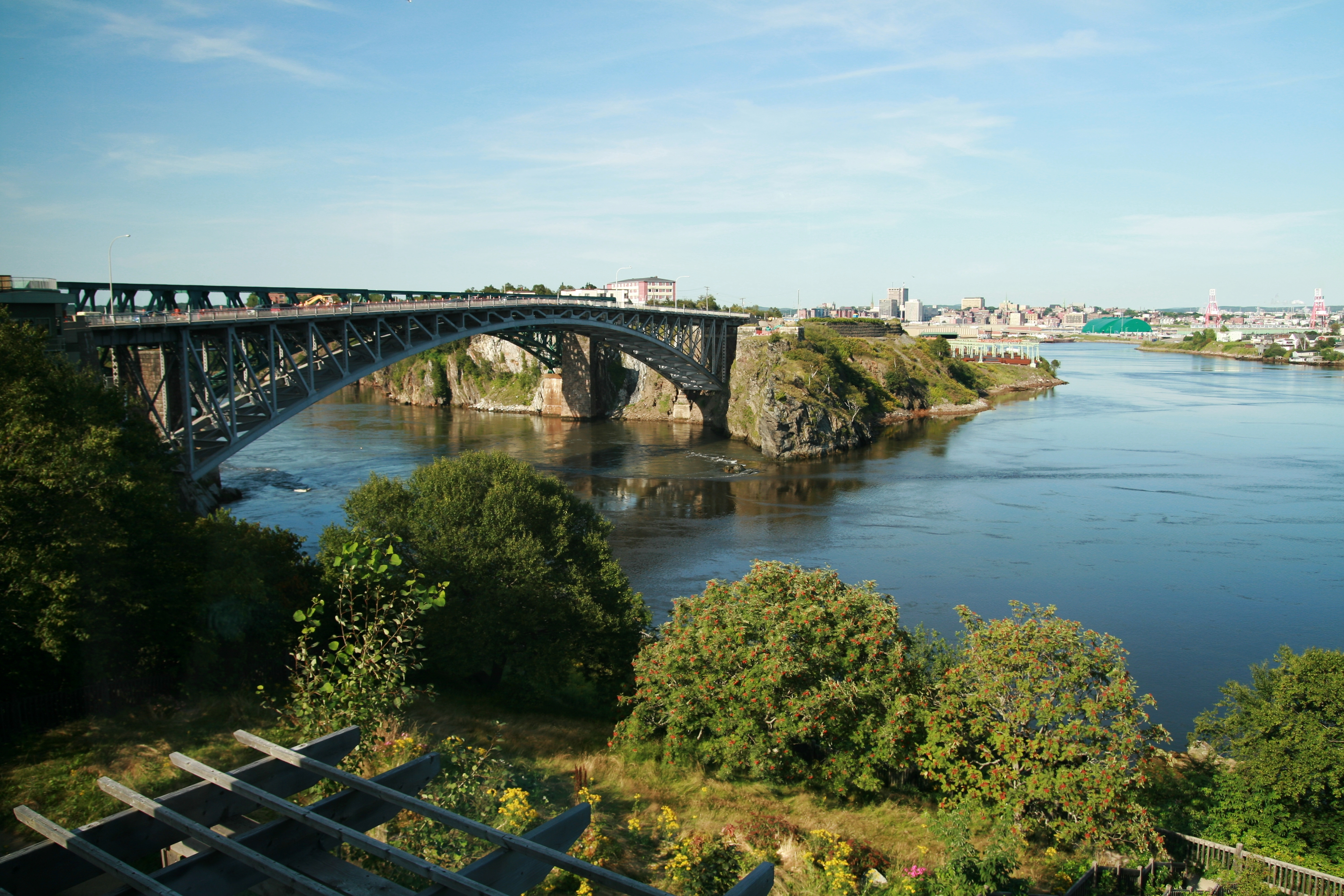
The falls flowing inbound

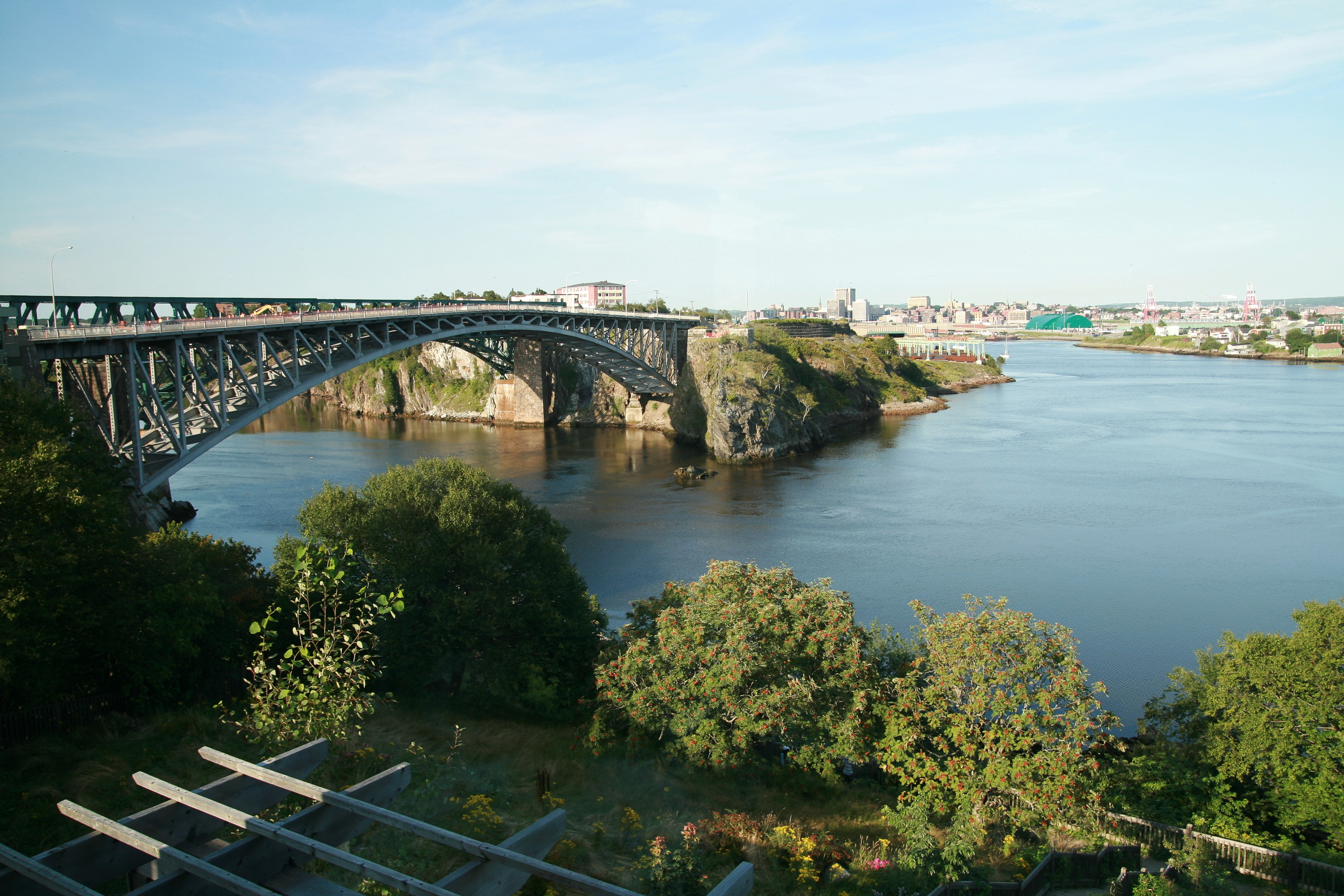
The falls slack, 38 minutes after the previous picture was taken

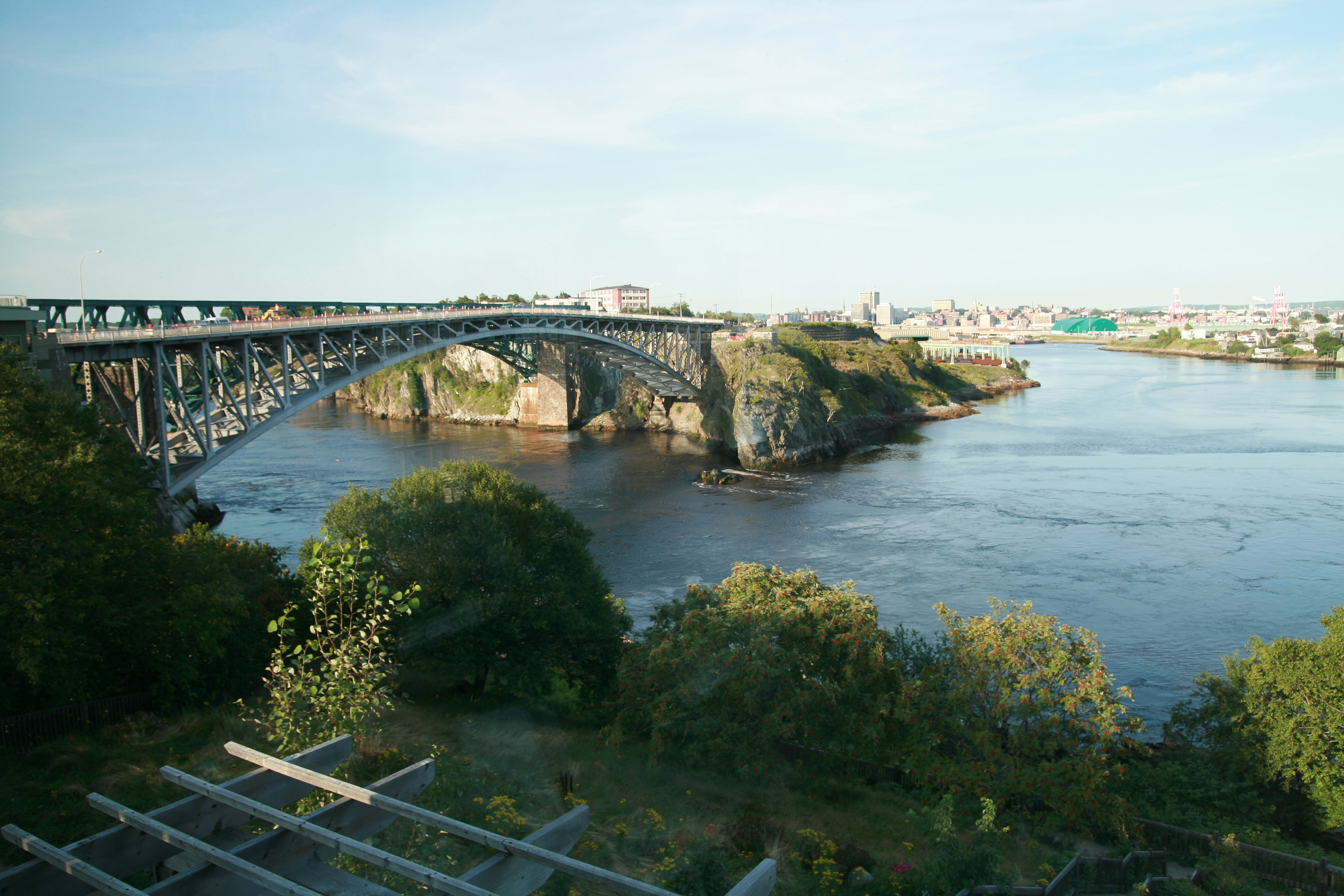
The falls flowing outbound, 15 minutes after the slack picture was taken, and 53 minutes after the first of the series was taken
