= Chinese Canadians in British Columbia =

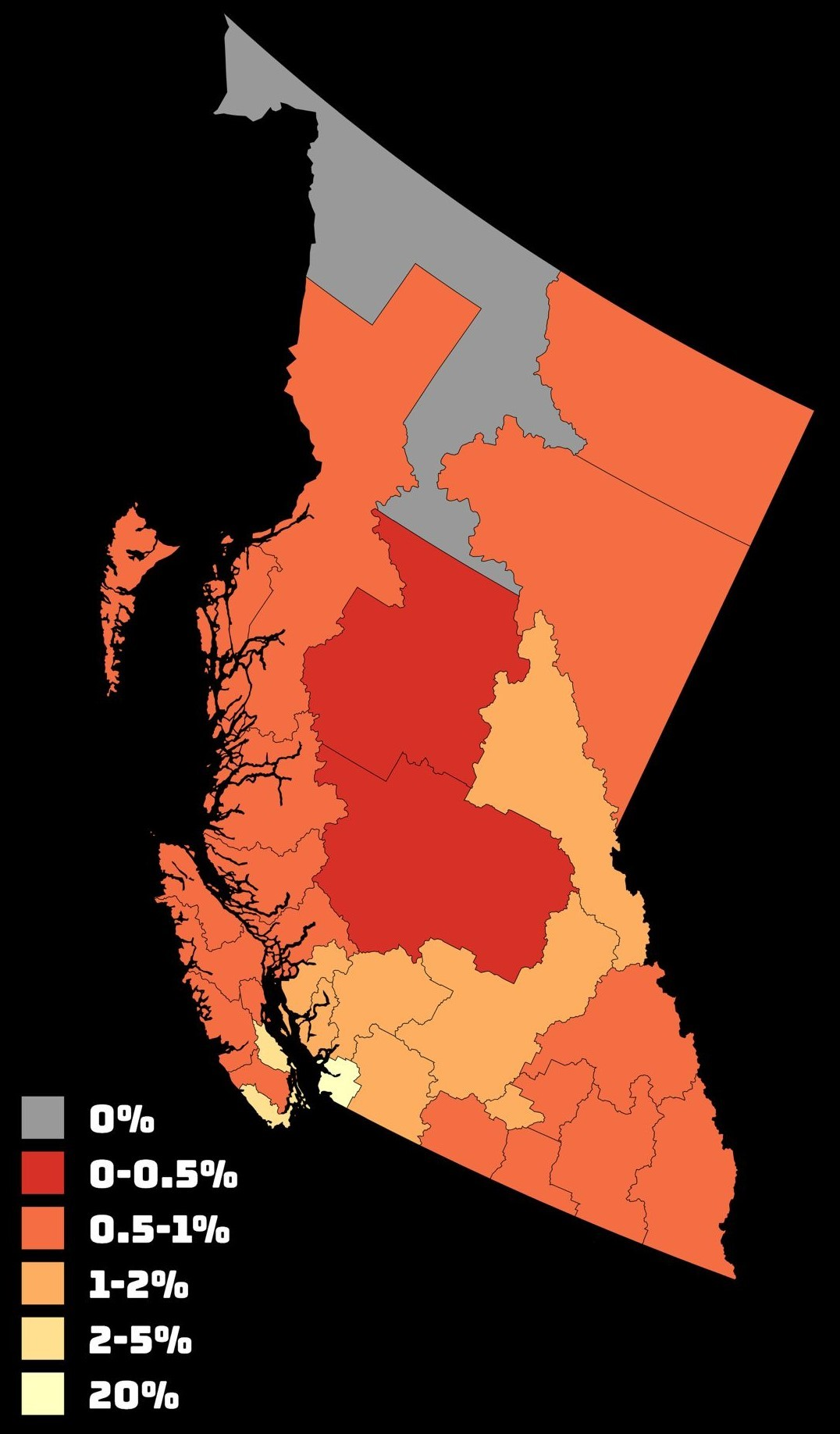
- Population distribution of Chinese Canadians in British Columbia by census division, 2021 census

Total population
- 550,590; 11% of the population of British Columbia (2021)

Regions with significant populations
- Richmond, Burnaby, Vancouver, Victoria, Surrey, Coquitlam, West Vancouver, Delta, and New Westminster.

Languages
- English, Cantonese, Mandarin, Min Chinese, Hokkien various other varieties of Chinese

Religion
- Irreligious, Chinese folk religions, Buddhism, Christianity, Taoism

Related ethnic groups
- Hong Kong Canadians, Taiwanese Canadians; Overseas Chinese, Chinese Americans

The history of Chinese Canadians in British Columbia began with the first recorded visit by Chinese people to North America in 1788. Some 30–40 men were employed as shipwrights at Nootka Sound in what is now British Columbia, to build the first European-type vessel in the Pacific Northwest, named the North West America. Large-scale immigration of Chinese began seventy years later with the advent of the Fraser Canyon Gold Rush of 1858. During the gold rush, settlements of Chinese grew in Victoria and New Westminster and the "capital of the Cariboo" Barkerville and numerous other towns, as well as throughout the colony's interior, where many communities were dominantly Chinese. In the 1880s, Chinese labour was contracted to build the Canadian Pacific Railway. Following this, many Chinese began to move eastward, establishing Chinatowns in several of the larger Canadian cities.

== History ==
=== Earliest arrival ===
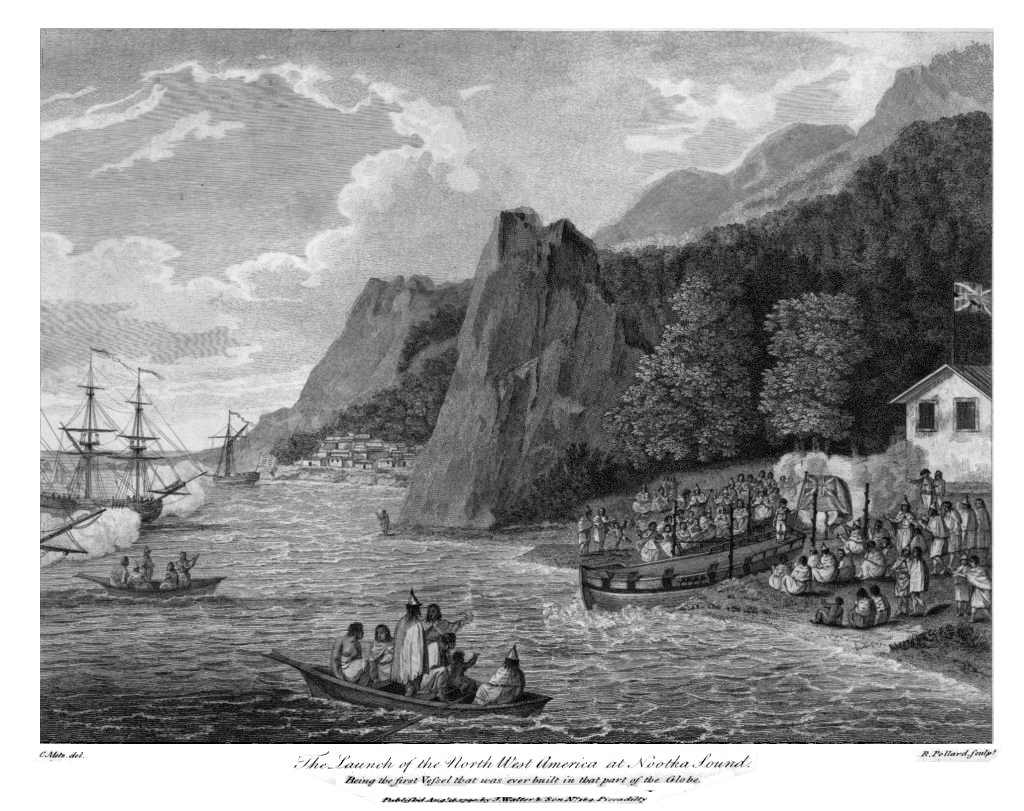
The launch of the North-West America at Nootka Sound, 1788

While the legend of the mythical country of Fusang is sometimes claimed to refer to Chinese monks in British Columbia in the 6th Century AD, it wasn't until the late 1780s that the first confirmed record was made of Chinese arrivals in BC. Some 120 Chinese contract labourers arrived at Nootka Sound, Vancouver Island. The British fur trader John Meares recruited an initial group of about 50 sailors and artisans from Canton (Guangzhou) and Macao. At Nootka Sound, the Chinese workers built a dockyard, a fort and a sailing ship, the North-West America. Regarding this journey and the future prospects of Chinese settlement in colonial North America, Meares wrote:

The Chinese were, on this occasion, shipped as an experiment: they have generally been esteemed an hardy, and industrious, as well as ingenious race of people; they live on fish and rice, and, requiring but low wages, it was a matter also of œconomical consideration to employ them; and during the whole of the voyage there was every reason to be satisfied with their services. If hereafter trading posts should be established on the American coast, a colony of these men would be a very valuable acquisition.

— John Meares, Voyages Made in the Years 1788 and 1789, from China to the North West Coast of America

The next year, Meares had another 70 Chinese craftsmen brought from Canton but, shortly after arrival of this second group, the settlement was seized by the Spanish in what became known as the Nootka Crisis, with the Chinese being imprisoned by the Spanish in the course of their seizure of Meares' property, which brought Britain and Spain to the brink of global war. It is unclear what became of them but likely that some returned to China while others were put to work in a nearby mine and later brought to Mexico. No other Chinese are known to have arrived in western North America until the Fraser gold rush of 1858.

=== Gold rush era ===
Chinese arrived with the massive and sudden migration of 30,000 gold-seekers and merchants from San Francisco and the California goldfields with the Fraser Gold Rush of 1858, forming the nucleus of Victoria's Chinatown and leading to the establishment of others at New Westminster, Yale and Lillooet, though most Chinese gold-seekers were not in the newly emerged towns but busy prospecting and working the goldfields. Estimates indicate that about 1/3 of the non-native population of the Fraser goldfields was Chinese. As more and more goldfields were found, Chinese spread out all over the colony, and confrontations at Rock Creek and Wild Horse Creek with mostly American miners, but the colonial government intervened on the side of the Chinese (other similar situations were fairly rare, until the railway era).

Chinese miners were notable in many of the gold rushes in the coming decades, including the remote Omineca and Peace River Gold Rushes of the 1860s Cassiar Gold Rush of the 1870s. While Chinese were driven from the Similkameen Gold Rush in the 1880s, the Cayoosh Gold Rush at Lillooet in that same decade was entirely Chinese. In most goldfield towns there were no distinct Chinatowns, and in many towns and gold camps, Chinese miners and merchants were often the majority so the term "Chinatown" is inapt for them. Barkerville had an "official" Chinatown but Chinese dominated the population in the town's whole area, and many non-Chinese lived in the "official" Chinatown; nearby Richfield was near-entirely Chinese, as were many of the towns in the Cariboo goldfields. As the more impatient non-Chinese miners moved on, Chinese took over their diggings, often pulling out more due to more advanced placer-mining techniques, and also obtained ranches and farms and Chinese retailers were often the mainstay of commerce in the waning goldfield towns. In Victoria, the first tax register for that city indicates that of the ten richest men in the city, eight were Chinese (with the Governor and James Dunsmuir only ahead of them on the list).

Chinese merchants from New Westminster were among the first to set up shop in Gastown, the townsite that sprang up next to the Hastings Mill property which was the historical kernel of what would become the City of Vancouver. Some were on Water Street but most early Chinese businesses (mostly bordellos and opium dens) were along what is now the 100 block of West Hastings Street. The use of Chinese labour in the clearing of the West End led to the winter riots of 1885 which saw Chinese residents flee to a refuge in a creek ravine around the then-southeast end of False Creek, thereafter known as China Creek. It was not until the 1890s that Chinese businesses began to relocate back into the growing city, along Dupont Street (now East Pender Street), forming the nucleus of Chinatown. Vancouver had the largest Chinese population in Canada until around 1980, when Toronto's Chinese population became the largest.

A group of Chinese in California sent one of their number, Ah Hong, to survey the Fraser Canyon after hearing that gold had been discovered there. Ah Hong verified that the gold rush was happening and stated this upon his May 1858 return. The Chinese first appeared in large numbers in the Colony of Vancouver Island in 1858 as part of the huge migration from California during the Fraser Canyon Gold Rush in the newly declared Mainland Colony. Around a third of the sudden, massive immigration were Chinese. Although the first wave arrived in May from California, news of the rush eventually attracted many Chinese from China itself. The San Francisco company Hop Kee & Co. commissioned the voyage of 300 Chinese gold miners and merchants on June 24, 1858; additional in-migration from California continued later in 1858 and throughout 1859.

Most Chinese mined gold, but there were some who mined jade, exporting it untaxed until British officials figured out what the big "black rocks" were. During the gold rush era, coal mines on Vancouver Island hired Chinese workers. Coal mines on the Island were to later hire Chinese workers as scabs, notably at Cumberland, where the Chinese workers' settlement was protected by barbed wire fences and watchtowers because of potential violence from union workers the Chinese had been brought into replace.

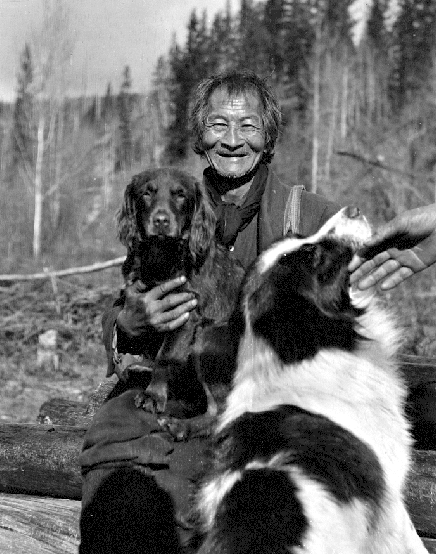
Omineca Miner Ah Hoo at Germansens Landing in 1913. Many Chinese remained in the province's Interior and North long after the gold rushes. Some towns such as Stanley were predominantly Chinese for many years, while in the Fraser Canyon and even more remote areas such as the Omineca, Chinese miners stayed on to mine claims in wilderness areas.

The Chinese often entered existing mining sites that white miners had abandoned since it was easier for them to acquire the claims to those fields instead of getting a claim to a new field. In many cases claims to used mining sites were less expensive than claims to new sites. Chinese miners then reworked the abandoned sites. In the goldfields, Chinese mining techniques and knowledge turned out to be better in many ways to those of others, including hydraulic techniques, the use of "rockers", and a technique whereby blankets were used as filter for alluvial sand and then burned, with the gold melting into lumps in the fire. The amount of gold earned by Chinese mining operations is not exactly known due to the difference between what was reported to the Gold Commissioners and what was not, a problem that also applied to miners of other nations in the goldfields:

we can only guess at the amount of gold taken out by the Chinese from what they sell to the banks, and we have no record of the quantity sent to their companies, or retained in private hands. All we know is that they are most industrious, and if you ask one what he is making he will perhaps tell you "six bittee". But stand and watch him wash up from his rocker, and he will probably take out $10 (£2) for his day's work.

— Henry Holbrook, British Columbia gold mines: a paper read before the Liverpool Geological Association, p. 10, B. Haram, Liverpool, England, 1884

In the Fraser Canyon, Chinese miners stayed on long after all others had left for the Cariboo Gold Rush or other goldfields elsewhere in BC or the United States and continued both hydraulic and farming, owned the majority of land in the Fraser and Thompson Canyons for many years afterwards. At Barkerville, in the Cariboo, over half the town's population was estimated to be Chinese, and several other towns including Richfield, Stanley, Van Winkle, Quesnellemouthe (modern Quesnel), Antler, and Quesnelle Forks had significant Chinatowns (Lillooet's lasting until the 1930s) and there was no shortage of successful Chinese miners.

In addition to the mining operations, Chinese established auxiliary businesses including vegetable farms, restaurants, and laundries. Chinese opened a fishing company in an area near the provincial capital. When fish canneries opened in the 1870s Chinese workers were hired. Chinese also worked for Western Union to install a telegraph line between New Westminster and Quesnel. Western Union hired 500 Chinese for this task in 1866.

In the beginning British Columbians had more tolerance and had little fear of the Chinese and that this differed from California. The province had given the Chinese the same legal protections that other ethnic groups enjoyed.

Non-Chinese were vocally upset because the Chinese were willing to work for wages lower than wages than whites. Non-Chinese workers and later organized labour groups criticized Chinese for working for less money than they did, preventing them from taking labour jobs and depressed overall wages. Whites perceived themselves to have superior physical condition and morals compared to the Chinese, and held that the Chinese had many diseases. The Chinese often sent money back to China instead of doing local investment. In addition the Chinese were observed to be taking in more money than they needed since the Chinese had simple lifestyles and did not have their families with them. Therefore, non-Chinese held that Chinese were not contributing anything to the area while they were taking resources from it:

"The Chinese work cheaper, live on less, and send more money out of the country than any other class of laborers. On the other hand they are industrious, sober, and reliable."

— Rosalind Watson Young and Maria Lawson

"Yet the image of thousands of Chinese seeking fortunes in the gold rush continues to dominate people's imaginations to this day. For this reason, Chinese were viewed as contributing little to the local economy while taking from the land." and that the Chinese were preventing economic growth from occurring. British and Americans believed that China was an inferior country and that European culture was superior over others. British Columbians were also afraid that the Chinese would someday be more numerous than the whites.

Whites had committed violent acts against Chinese, and therefore Chinese had avoided areas where whites had newly discovered gold. The Europeans Canadian public had an anti-Chinese attitude and made anti-Chinese statements. European Canadian-dominated newspapers along with politicians made anti-Chinese statements. The Library and Archives Canada stated that blaming the Chinese for economic downturns was a way to promote white supremacy and give a sense of unity to whites. British Columbians had made public efforts to demand laws that limited the amount of Chinese immigration and enacting restrictions on Chinese activity.

The gold rush era saw the population of Chinese in British Columbia in the 1860s to be around 6,000–7,000. Once the Gold Rush in Canada ended, many Chinese moved to the United States. According to the 1871 Canadian census there were 1,548 Chinese in the province. In 1878 there were about 3,000 Chinese in the province.

The province began attempting to pass head tax and licensing bills modeled after similar anti-Chinese laws in Australia. In 1878, the provincial government passed a law forbidding Chinese from engaging in provincial public works. A bill calling for a $30 license fee per every half year per head was passed in the provincial legislature in 1878, making it the first anti-Chinese law in British Columbia. The law prompted a strike of Chinese workers, which was the first Chinese civil rights action taken in the province. An 1884 law, titled the "Chinese Population Regulation Act," affected all Chinese, including those of Hong Kong origin, stated that "any person of the Chinese race" must pay $100 per head for anyone 15 or older. This was later amended to $10 per head per year. In the same period the federal government, acting on direction from London, had blocked many anti-Chinese laws passed by the BC government, namely attempts at a head tax, which was beyond the province's jurisdiction and a federal matter. For instance the 1878 law was nulled for constitutional reasons, similarly blocking another law in 1884.

The places of origin of the Chinese immigrants were not recorded on Canadian census records. Most immigrants to British Columbia in the late 1800s were from Guangdong, with many others from Fujian. Of those from Guangdong, most came from Siyi (Sze-yap), a group of four counties.

By 1862 Barkerville had over 5,000 Chinese. The same year, Victoria had 300 Chinese people, making up 6% of the city's population; Victoria incorporated that year.

=== Immigration for the railway ===
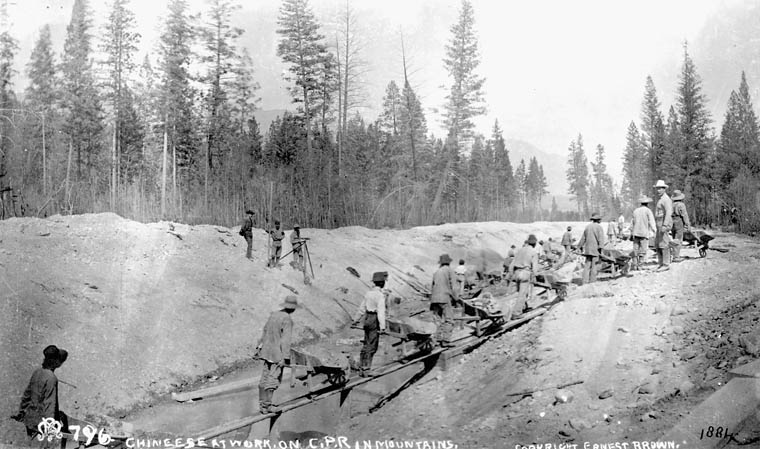
Chinese labourers working on the Canadian Pacific Railway mile sections of the Canadian Pacific Railway from the Pacific to Craigellachie in the Eagle Pass in British Columbia. The railway from Vancouver to Craigellachie consisted of 28 such sections, 2% of which were constructed by workers of European origin.

When British Columbia agreed to join Confederation in 1871, one of its conditions was that the Dominion government build a railway linking B.C. with eastern Canada within 10 years. British Columbia politicians and their electorate agitated for an immigration program from the British Isles to provide this railway labour, but Canada's first Prime Minister, Sir John A. Macdonald, betrayed the wishes of his constituency, Victoria, and insisted the project cut costs by employing Chinese to build the railway. He summarized the situation this way to Parliament in 1882: "It is simply a question of alternatives: either you must have this labour or you can't have the railway." (British Columbia politicians had wanted a settlement-immigration plan for workers from the British Isles, but Canadian politicians and investors said it would be too expensive).

In 1880, Andrew Onderdonk, an American who was one of the main construction contractors in British Columbia for Canadian Pacific Railway, originally recruited Chinese labourers from California. When most of these deserted the railway workings for the goldfields, Onderdonk and his agents signed several agreements with Chinese contractors in China's Guangdong province, Taiwan, and also via Chinese companies in Victoria. Through those contracts, more than 5000 labourers were sent by ship as "guest workers" from China. Onderdonk also recruited more than 7000 Chinese railway workers from California. These two groups of workers were the main force for the building of Onderdonk's seven per cent of the railway's mileage. As was the case with non-Chinese workers, some of them fell ill during construction or died while planting explosives or in other construction accidents, but many deserted the rail workings for the province's various goldfields. By the end of 1881, the first group of Chinese labourers, which was previously numbered at 5000, had fewer than 1500 remaining. Onderdonk needed more workers, so he directly contracted with Chinese businessmen in Victoria, California, and China to send many more workers to Canada. Some 17,000 Chinese, many of whom became railroad employees, arrived to Canada between 1881 and 1885.

Winter conditions and hazardous working conditions, dynamite blasts, substandard medical care and nutrition, and landslides killed many railroad workers. Paul Yee, the author of Saltwater City: Story of Vancouver's Chinese Community, wrote that "[c]onservative estimates" stated that the total number of Chinese railroad workers killed was 600.

Onderdonk engaged Chinese labour contractors who recruited Chinese workers willing to accept only $1 a day; white, black, and native workers were paid three times that amount. Chinese railway workers were hired for 200 miles of the Canadian Pacific Railway considered to be among the more difficult segments of the projected railway, notably the Fraser Canyon.

After the railroad was completed, some Chinese who had worked on the railroad returned to China. Many Chinese stayed in the Interior of British Columbia after the railroad was completed, although some moved to New Westminster and Victoria instead. Others who stayed in Canada went to Vancouver and to the Prairie Provinces.

=== Settlement in the late 1800s ===
In 1881, 4,350 Chinese lived in British Columbia, making up 99.2% of the Chinese in all of Canada. Around 1881 Chinese settlement in British Columbia had a 28 male to 1 female ratio. The gender disparity was not as high in New Westminster and Victoria, but in there was a more severe gender disparity in the Fraser and Thompson canyons, Barkerville, Cassiar, Nanaimo, and market gardens in the vicinity of Victoria. In 1883 there were almost 1,500 Chinese gold miners in the province.

In 1882 8,000 Chinese arrived in Canada. The province was unable to pass its own immigration law, so it asked the federal government to take action. In the late 1800s the province supported efforts by the Canadian federal government to charge a head tax to discourage Chinese from immigrating to Canada. The Chinese Immigration Act of 1885, which included the head tax, was passed shortly after the railway construction cased. No other ethnic group had a tax levied on it during immigration. The tax was originally $50. An earlier colonial-era attempt at a head tax was for $10 was defeated in the Vancouver Island House of Assembly on June 15, 1865 and was pointedly not supported by the Times-Colonist, whose editorial gave some of the reasons for hostility towards Chinese in the Vancouver Island goldfields:

When the Chinaman arrives in the country and proceeds to the Island mines, let him be treated exactly as the white man; let him pay his license and other fees, and be protected in the same manner. It is the non-collection of licenses which has created so violent an antipathy against him in the neighbouring colony.

The mining bill at present before the House of Assembly makes, however, the taking out of a mining license compulsory on every person under a penalty of $50, and it only requires a little vigilance on the part of the Gold Commissioner to have every Chinamen at Sooke an acceptable contributor to the Crown Revenue. Any remission by which the Chinese are allowed to work without paying their share to the Government will, while injuring the Crown receipts, create a great deal of hostile feeling against them by the other miners. This should by all possible means by avoided.

We have given what we conceive to be the principal objections against the celestials; but there is the other side of the picture. Of all classes of our population the Chinese are the most orderly and the most sober. They cost the country less in the police and judicial department. When they buy from the white population, they put the money down on the counter, and what is probably the best appreciated of all their characteristics by their lighter skinned brethren – they never "skedaddle."

The deadliest anti-Chinese action of the era happened on May 10, 1883 at CPR construction Camp 37, near Lytton when, after a Chinese worker who had been reinstated after previous violence and led a gang to attack and kill the white foreman who had been persuaded by a Chinese boss to rehire him. In retaliation for the killing, a group of irate 20 white railway workers attacked the Chinese part of the camp, setting a house on fire in a riot that left one Chinese dead and injuring several others

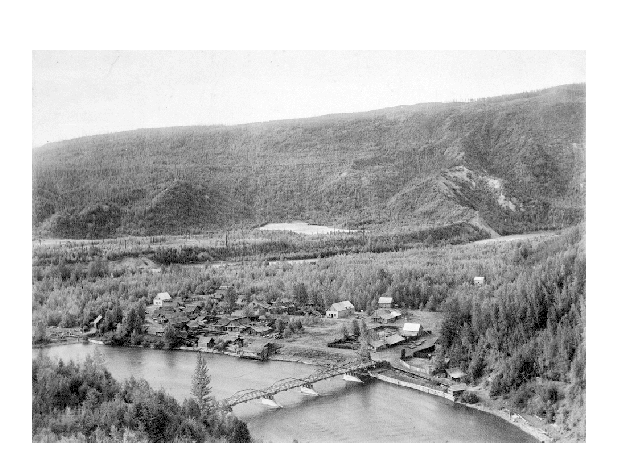
Quesnelle Forks in 1885

By 1884 Nanaimo, New Westminster, and Victoria had the largest Chinese populations in the province. At that time Quesnelle Forks was majority Chinese, and there were also Chinese in Cumberland and Yale.

In addition to work on the railway, most Chinese in the late 19th century British Columbia lived among other Chinese and worked in market gardens, coal mines, sawmills, and salmon canneries.

The province banned Chinese and First Nations-origin persons from voting in provincial and federal elections with an amendment of the Qualification of Voters Act passed in 1872. Because eligibility for federal elections originated from provincial voting lists, persons of Chinese origins were unable to vote in federal elections. At the time some electoral districts in British Columbia were majority Chinese.

The city of Vancouver incorporated in April 1886, and at the time the city had a pre-existing Chinese population. In the period's newspaper articles, according to James Morton, author of In the Sea of Sterile Mountains, in Vancouver's initial history "anti-Chinese sentiment appeared to be unanimous". According to Morton, white Victorians in the late 1800s had a "quite congenial" relationship with the ethnic Chinese in their community.

In 1887 there were 124 Chinese who came to Canada, a sharp decrease. The numbers of Chinese began increasing around the year 1900. In 1900 this tax increased to $100, and in 1903 it became $500, again reducing immigration levels of Chinese. An average worker's yearly wages were below $500. The head tax did not significantly decrease Chinese immigration into British Columbia, and that this caused members of the British Columbia legislature to call for further restrictions on Chinese.

R.G. Tatlow, a Vancouver member of the British Columbia legislature, proposed the "Act to Regulate Immigration into British Columbia," or the Natal Act. The bill was intended to reduce immigration from China and Japan. According to the bill, a person would have to fill out a form in a European language in order to enter the province. An amendment added to the bill disallowed it from being applied to a person who had his or her entry controlled by the Canadian parliament, and this made the bill no longer apply to the Chinese. In September 1901 the federal government blocked the bill.

In the area of Lac La Hache in the South Cariboo, as elsewhere in the Interior, Chinese worked as farm labourers and as freighters:

Chinese are frequently the butter-makers as well as the general farm laborers. They are old residents, for they came from California when the white miners came, upon learning of the discovery of gold. Not only do they mine and farm, they also "freight". As there is no railway, goods have to be delivered by freight waggons, large canvas-covered vans drawn by six or seven horses. So large and profitable a business is by no means wholly in the hands of the Chinese. They freight only for their countrymen.

=== 20th century ===
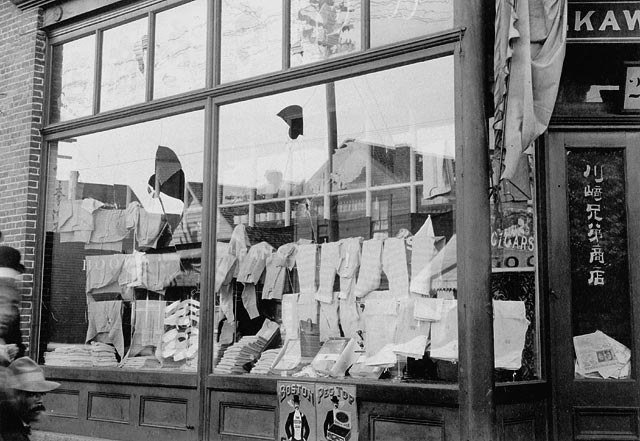
Damage after the September 1907 riot in Vancouver

In 1907 the Asiatic Exclusion League sponsored a parade in Vancouver that opposed persons of Asian origin. This parade developed into a riot that caused damage to Vancouver's Chinatown and Japantown.

The 1911 census stated that Vancouver had 3,559 Chinese, giving it the largest Chinese population in all of Canada. That year, Victoria had 3,458 Chinese. Victoria had Canada's second-largest Chinatown.

The Chinese Immigration Act, 1923 prohibited Chinese from obtaining Crown land and it prevented Chinese who were not persons born in Canada, diplomats, businesspersons, and university students from immigrating to Canada. The Canadian Encyclopedia wrote that the act "effectively ended Chinese immigration." This immigration act also starved small town Chinese communities in British Columbia of new arrivals.

As part of the Great Depression many Chinese began leaving small towns and settling in Vancouver and Victoria. In 1931 the Chinese populations of Vancouver and Victoria combined became more numerous than the Chinese elsewhere in British Columbia.

The immigration act was repealed in 1947. As a result, many smaller locations in British Columbia which had Chinese populations mostly of older men finally began receiving women and children. In 1947 Chinese citizens in British Columbia were given the right to vote, and in 1951 the final anti-Chinese laws in British Columbia were terminated.

In the mid-20th century, Chinese began moving from smaller British Columbia towns to Vancouver and eastern Canada because of the collapse of some of British Columbia's agricultural industries. The rise of agricultural operations in the United States in the market in the 1950s made local British Columbia market gardening unprofitable, and this deprived Chinese remaining in the province's interior of their livelihood. The consequence was a decline in small-town Chinese populations that began in that decade.

In 1961–1962 Vancouver, Victoria, and about 60 other settlements in British Columbia had a total of 24,000 Chinese. About 18,000 were resident in the Vancouver area, 2,000 were resident in Victoria, and 4,000 were resident in other places.

In the 1980s a wave of Chinese from Hong Kong came to Vancouver. Levels of Chinese coming from Hong Kong declined after the Handover of Hong Kong in 1997. Vivienne Poy wrote that instances of antagonism towards Chinese and incidents of racial hatred targeting Chinese occurred by the late 1980s.

In 1983 restrictions were eased and Chinese emigration became prevalent as large numbers of people chose to leave China to study abroad, work temporarily or immigrate.

== Geography ==
=== Chinatowns and Chinese communities ===
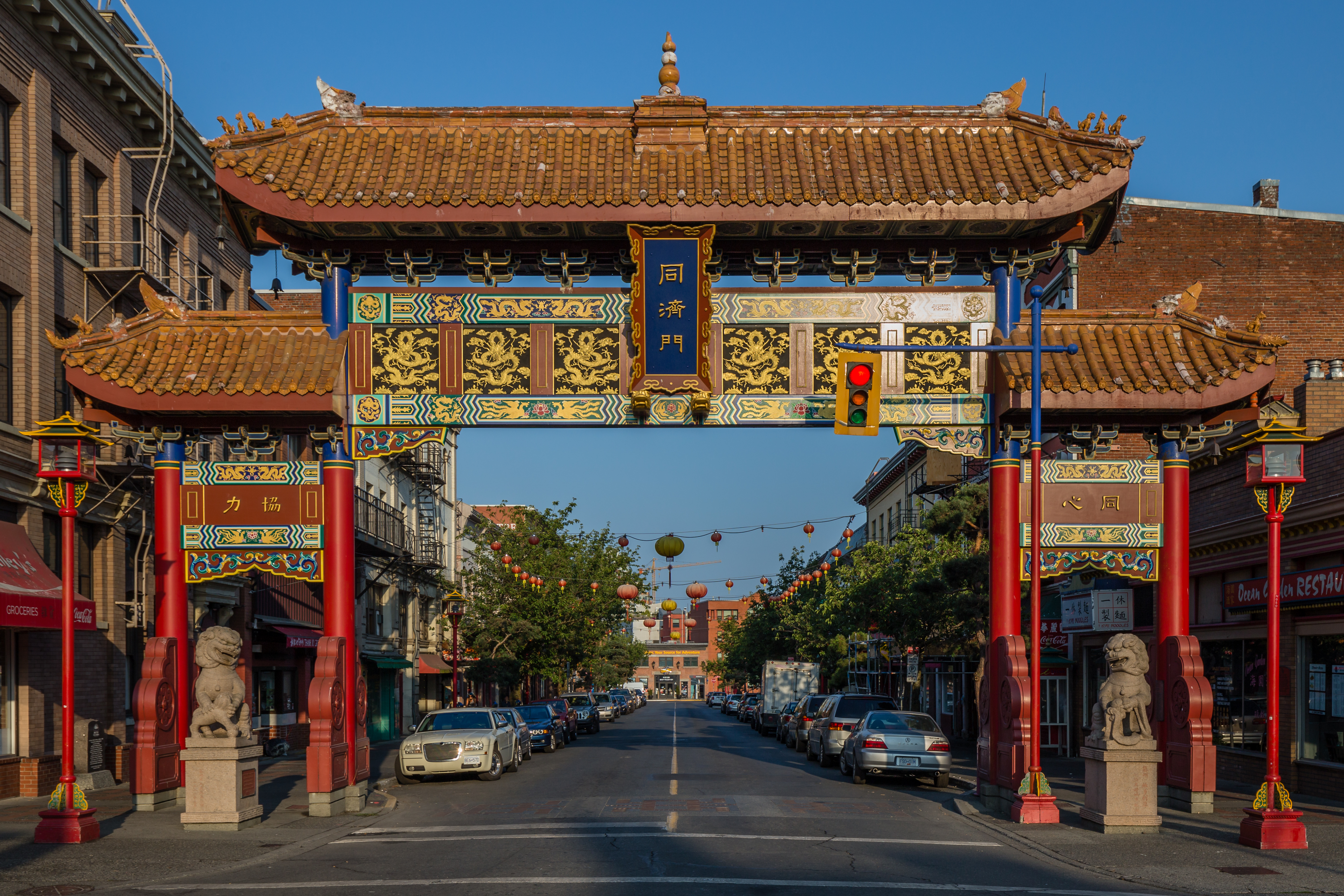
Victoria Chinatown

As of 2002 the only sizeable Chinatowns in the entire province were in Vancouver and Victoria, with most Chinese Canadians in British Columbia living elsewhere than in traditional Chinatowns.

Around the 1860s and 1870s there were Chinatowns in Barkerville, Keithley Creek, Lytton, Nanaimo, Quesnellemouth, Wellington, Yale, and other mining towns. During the gold rushes of the 1800s several Chinese settlements appeared in mining areas, particularly the Cariboo, and these ones had short lifespans. In the 1880s the largest in BC were, in order, Victoria, New Westminster, Nanaimo, and Quesnellemouth. Dog Creek, Lytton, Quesnelle Forks, and several other places also had Chinese populations.

Communities that had Chinatowns and/or areas where Chinese were concentrated in the mid-20th century, other than Vancouver and Victoria, were Ashcroft, Duncan, Kamloops, Kelowna, Nanaimo, Nelson, Port Alberni, Prince George, Prince Rupert, and Vernon. These communities, along with Quesnel, and Trail were the "twelve major Chinese communities in smaller towns". Chinese restaurants made up the majority of the businesses, and overall about 25% of the total businesses were grocery stores; the Chinese also operated shoe repair shops, and dry goods stores, in addition to taxi operations. There were some laundry shops but mechanical washing processes had reduced the number of traditional laundries.

=== Vancouver Island ===
Victoria, in the 1800s, was known as Dabu (Big port or first port) because its Chinatown was the province's largest. Victoria's Chinatown "was known for its maze of alleyways and courtyards, containing everything from theatres and restaurants to gambling dens."

There were Chinatowns in Nanaimo through the course of that city's history. Chinese from Cumberland, Extension, Northfield, South Wellington, and Wellington patronized the second Chinatown. On September 30, 1960 the third Chinatown was destroyed by a fire.

The Chinese community of Cumberland initially lived in Union, another mining community nearby. Cumberland's Chinatown first opened in 1888, and it had a population of 2,500 at its peak, making it the second-largest Chinese settlement in all of North America at that time. with about 540 Chinese working as miners as of 1920. The community had a chapter of the Chinese Nationalist League and another of the Hongmen Society's Dart Coon Club. Cumberland had 80 Chinese businesses, including boarding houses, a temple, the gambling business Lum Yung Club, two theatres, four restaurants, 24 grocery stores, and four drugstores at its height. The Chinese population waned and then collapsed due to two factors: the closures of the mines in Union in the 1920s and a 1936 fire that destroyed much of the town, with all trace of Chinese commerce or inhabitants gone by 1968. In 2010, siblings May Gee, John Leung, and Joyce Lowe had a 400-square-foot (37 m^{2}) pavilion, built of wood from the surrounding area, on the site of the former Chinatown. It was built for below the original quoted cost of $35,000, with its final cost being only $17,000. There was another Chinatown located in Bevan, a locality north of the east end of nearby Comox Lake.

=== The Interior ===
Barkerville's large Chinatown was destroyed in that town's Great Fire of September 16, 1868 fire, and since the Chinese miners left Barkerville, a subsequent Chinatown established after the fire failed. In 1878 Barkerville had 142 Chinese gold miners, ten Chinese women, five Chinese storekeepers, and two Chinese washermen making a total of 159.

Kamloops did not have a "true Chinatown" historically but rather a strip along the city's Victoria Street where most Chinese lived, with Chinese businesses there having been established first in 1887. The Kamloops area had a population of about 500 Chinese in 1885. By 1890 the community had up to 400 Chinese. By the 1890s one of Kelowna was Chinese. Economic changes in Kamloops caused Chinese to leave the city: two fires in 1892 and 1893, and a 1911–1914 demolition that dismantled the remaining buildings in the city's Chinatown. The Chinese cemetery in Kamloops, which was designed by Chinese geomancy and was one of the largest Chinese cemeteries in the province, and was the only one dedicated to the earliest Chinese pioneers. It was last used in the 1960s,

Kelowna's Chinatown lay in the one-square block area between Harvey Avenue and Leon Avenue, east of Abbott and west of Highway 97/Harvey Avenue in today's downtown of that city and across from City Park. Chinatown, which Sun Yat-sen visited in 1911 on a fundraising campaign, was already in existence when Kelowna incorporated in 1905. In 1909–1911 15% of Kelowna's population was Chinese. By 1930, there were an estimated 400–500 Chinese still living in Chinatown, declining thereafter such that by 1960 there were only 50,. In 2006, 1.2% of the city's population (1,235 out of 106,707) was Chinese, with that figure dropping to 1% of Kelowna's population by 2010. In 1978 the final remaining traditional Chinese business ceased operations. A rebuilt section of the façade of a store that had been located in Chinatown is now housed at the Kelowna Museum.

Penticton previously had a Chinatown called "Shanghai Alley". There were two laundries along with rooming houses and restaurants. Its peak population was 60. Around 1960 the Chinatown was disestablished. As of 2011 a parking lot was in place of that Chinatown. There is a Chinatown monument on Westminster Avenue West. There is a mural on the Guerard Furniture Co. building which commemorates this Chinatown. An archival photograph of the Chinatown served as the inspiration for the mural.

Vernon at one time had a Chinatown in its downtown area, and its Chinese population was the largest in an area east of Vancouver and west of Calgary. According to Oram about 1,000 Chinese resided in Vernon in 1885. A Chinese clubroom opened in 1919; that year there were 500 Chinese in Vernon. The Chinese Masonic Lodge, constructed in 1952, is now the Gateway Men and Women's Shelter. It is one of the final remaining buildings of the Vernon Chinatown.

Several hundred Chinese resided in Armstrong in 1885 with additional Chinese coming to work on celery gardens in 1906 and 1907. The population declined, and in 1947 there were 60 Chinese farmworkers remaining with 1,400 Chinese in the area involved in agricultural operations by 1949. Celery was an area of specialty of Chinese agriculture in the area, with about one-third of their total lands dedicated to celery and about 1,000 tons each year shipped each year.

Keremeos had a Chinatown that was established by the early 20th century. In it, there were two laundries, one restaurant, and one store. A Similkameen Valley settler, Gint Cawston, wrote an account that stated that Chinese in the community maintained their culture. Chinese in Keremeos worked in canning plants, on railroads, and in vegetable gardens.

=== Lower Mainland ===
Yale's Chinatown was on Front Street, which was adjacent to the steamboat docks on the Fraser River, similarly to New Westminster's in commercial purpose, and was the oldest Chinatown on the Mainland. There were 100 Chinese residents in 1861, 500 in 1865, and about 300 by the 1870s.

New Westminster's Chinatown was the second largest in the province and the largest on the British Columbia mainland prior to the development of Vancouver. In 1881 New Westminster had 485 Chinese. Chinese people of the era referred to New Westminster as Erbu, or Yifao, meaning "second port," because the city had the province's second largest Chinatown. After Vancouver became a prominent centre and began to be called Erbu, Chinese disambiguated New Westminster by referring to it as Danshui Erbu, or "the Second Port on Fresh Water," but the usage reverted to Erbu, which persists as of 2007. Due to an increase in the use of Chinese labour by the city's industries, there were over 1,455 Chinese in New Westminster by 1884. Of the two Chinatowns at the time of the fire, only one was rebuilt after the city's Great Fire of 1898, with new buildings housing The Chinese Reform Society and the Chinese Methodist Church being among those first built. A third Chinatown, so-called, was the Riverside Apartments near to where the second Chinatown had been.

Reinforced concrete structures were established in the 1910s and the area of Carnarvon Street and Columbia Street became the Chinese community's commercial centre. The concentration of Chinese in the city was centred around the intersection of Columbia and McInnes streets by the 1920s, with a total Chinese population in the city being 750 by the time of the 1921 census. The population and scope of the Chinatown was damaged by the 1923 Chinese Immigration Act (often incorrectly known as the Chinese Exclusion Act, which is a similar piece of historical legislation in the United States), and due to a supply of jobs in Vancouver many Chinese moved to that city. There were 600 Chinese in the city in 1931, and by the 1930s there were only a few Chinese businesses still in operation. The Chinese in New Westminster had no particular area of concentration by the 1940s; at that time the Chinatown was nonexistent.

=== Geography of the Vancouver area ===
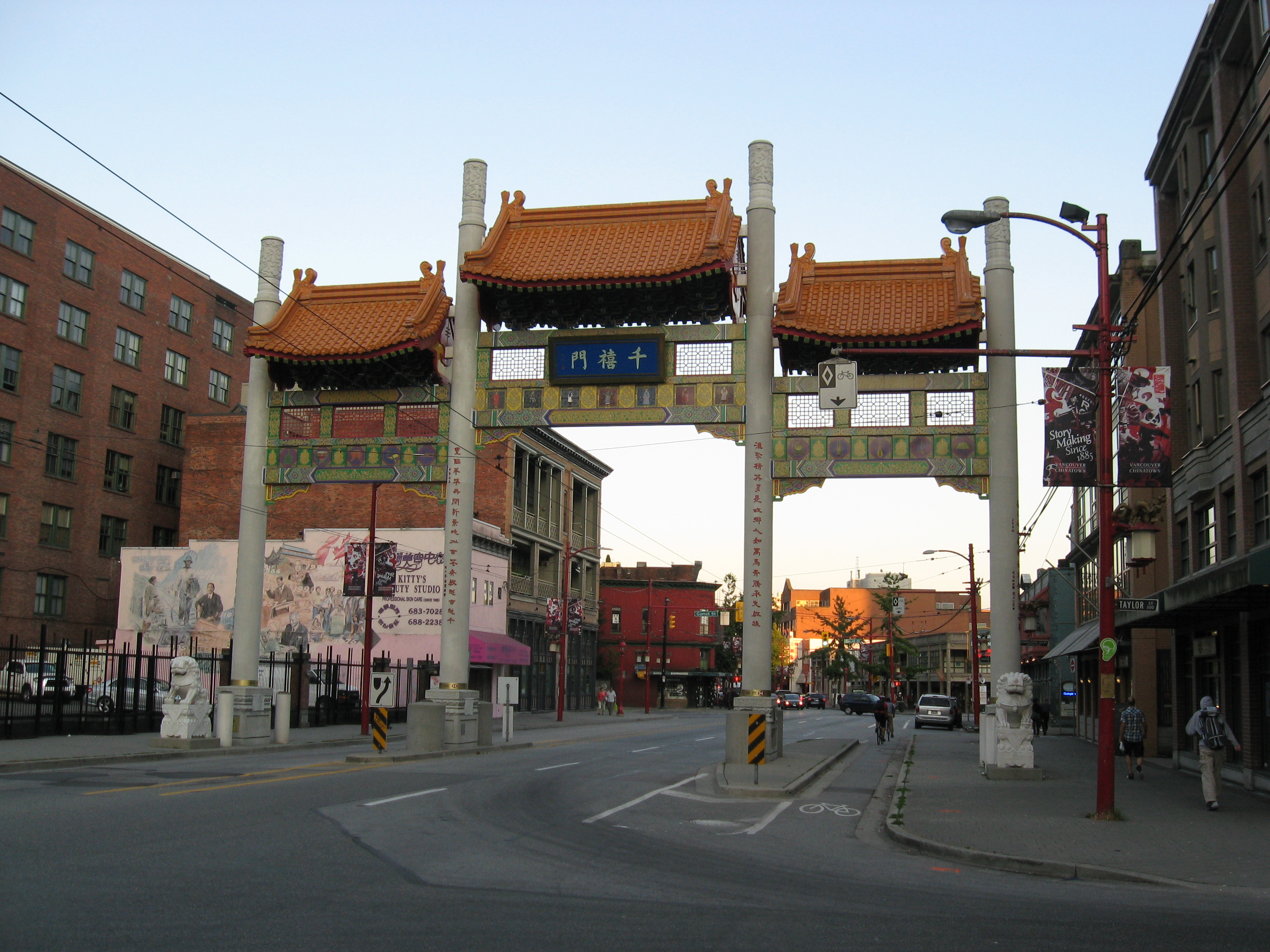
Vancouver Chinatown

As of 2011 there are over 450,000 Chinese in Greater Vancouver. Vancouver received the title of being, outside of Asia, the "most Asian city" due to its large Chinese population. Vancouver had Chinese residents when the city was incorporated in 1886 and Chinese merchants were among the first handful of stores on Water Street, the city's original core, which was founded in 1867. People with origins from Hong Kong "have been especially notable in the flow of international migrants to British Columbia which, for all intents and purposes, has meant the Vancouver region."

Significant Chinese populations are located in all Greater Vancouver neighbourhoods. Richmond, in Greater Vancouver, had more Chinese residents than European Canadian residents in 2013, and has been described as "the most Chinese city in North America."

== Demographics ==
As of 2001, 374,000 Chinese resided in British Columbia, and 348,000 of them resided in the Vancouver metropolitan area. Chinese in British Columbia made up 34% of the total Chinese population in Canada, and 10% of the total population of British Columbia. As of 2001, 18% of the residents of the Vancouver area and 4% of the residents of the Victoria area were Chinese. In 2006, 168,210 persons in Vancouver proper were Chinese, as were 75,730 in Richmond, and 3,085 people in Victoria.

In 1961–62 Canada had about 24,000 Chinese, including 18,000 in the Vancouver area, 2,000 in Victoria, 286 in Port Alberni, 254 in Prince Rupert, 240 in Nanaimo, 230 in Nelson according to the area Chinese, 200 in Duncan according to the area Chinese, 196 in Prince George, 191 in the Kamloops area, 145 in Vernon, 85 in Quesnel according to the Chinese residents, 80 in Ashcroft according to the Chinese residents, 69 in the Trail-Rossland area, 62 in Kelowna, as well as about 1,962 persons in other places in the province. At the time, in the communities other than Vancouver, Victoria, and Nanaimo, the sex ratios between males and females ranged from four men per woman to ten men per woman, and older males were the majority of the Chinese populations of these towns at the time. The majority of the non-Vancouver, non-Victoria Chinese populations at the time were employees of small businesses. The working class populations outside of Vancouver and Victoria mainly consisted of sawmill workers in Duncan and stevedores in Port Alberni.

The 2006 Chinese populations of the towns not in the Vancouver nor Victoria areas were as follows: 1,235 in Kelowna, 1,065 in Kamloops, 810 in Prince George, 330 in Vernon, 285 in Prince Rupert, 120 in Port Alberni, 120 in Quesnel, 90 in Nelson, 65 in Duncan, 45 in Rossland, and 15 in Trail.

By the 2021 Canadian Census, Chinese Canadians enumerated 550,590, or 11% of the total population of British Columbia

== Language ==
In the 19th Century until the influx of the 1980s, multiple dialects of Cantonese were spoken in British Columbia. This is because Guangdong province itself, the source of much Chinese immigration, had multiple dialects of Cantonese and the Hakka language spoken within its borders. Most railway workers were from Taishan and spoke the Taishanese dialect of Cantonese.

Historically Cantonese was the dominant language in Greater Vancouver. Cantonese was the language used in radio and television programming involving that community. As of 1970 there were fewer than 100 Hakka Chinese speakers in Vancouver. By 2003, Mandarin began to have a presence, including in the media, due to an increase in immigrants from mainland China. By 2012 Mandarin was displacing Cantonese in Greater Vancouver. Cantonese and Mandarin are commonly spoken in Richmond.

== Institutions ==
In 1863 the first Chinese association in Canada, located in Barkerville, was established. It was the Zhi-gong Tang (Chi Kung T'ong), translated into English as the "Chinese Freemasons." It served as a Masonic lodge but did not have formal ties to European-origin Masons.

=== Institutions in Victoria ===
In 1884 the Chinese Consolidated Benevolent Association (CCBA) (Note: in Chinese: Chinese: 中華會館; pinyin: Zhōnghuá Huìguǎn)) was formed in Victoria. The organization initially acted as an unofficial consulate of the Chinese government; the San Francisco consulate gave permission to Chinese businesspersons in Vancouver to establish the CCBA in the spring of that year. This function continued until the 1908 opening of the Chinese Embassy in Ottawa. The purpose of the CCBA became broader and it in general became a Chinese advocacy organization. As the British Columbia Chinese population shifted to Vancouver, the CCBA moved to Vancouver in the 1930s.

In Victoria the Woman's Missionary Society of the Methodist Church, Canada had established the Oriental Home and School, a mission to prevent child prostitution. The institution served its original mission and also became a women's shelter. It was established as the Chinese Girls' Rescue Home in December 1887, and it received its new name on December 30, 1908. It closed in May 1942.

In 1967 the Victoria Chinese Canadian Veterans Association, which organizes Remembrance Day events and Victoria Day parades involving the Chinese community, was established.

=== Institutions in Greater Vancouver ===
Prior to the 1960s, many Chinese in Vancouver established associations based on their clan origins and districts in addition to educational and recreational organizations. The Chinese Benevolent Association of Vancouver (CBA), as of 2006, has 2,000 members and serves as a federation of various Vancouver-based Chinese organizations. Douglas Aitken of The Georgia Straight stated that the CBA was the most important organization operating in the Vancouver Chinatown in the first half of the 20th century. The Vancouver Sun wrote "They were, for all intents and purposes, the government of Chinatown." It was first established in 1896, and it was registered as a nonprofit organization ten years later.

=== Institutions in other cities ===
As of 1968 Duncan had an office for persons with the name Zheng/Cheung, and this served as the city's sole clan association.

In 1977 the Kamloops Chinese Cultural Association (KCCA) was incorporated. In addition to the cultural association, Kamloops also hosts a Chinese Freemasons group and a Taiwanese cultural society.

The Okanagan Chinese Canadian Association is headquartered in Kelowna. In addition in the 1960s Kelowna had a boarding house for men named Huang/Wong, and this functioned as the city's sole clan association.

The Freemasons served as the sole community organization of the Chinese in Nanaimo since the 1959 fire. Prior to 1959 Nanaimo had multiple Chinese associations. The Rising China Holding Company, the owner of the third Chinatown, in a period prior to 1959 served as the de facto government of the area. It had several locality associations, including the Yu-shan Hui-guan, (Note: in Chinese: (Chinese: 禺山會館; Cantonese: Ue-Shaan Ooi-koon)) which served Guangzhou (Canton)-origin Chinese. It also housed clan and fraternal associations. The Rising China company lost influence after the Chinese began to integrate into the town by moving outside of Chinatown and learning the English language. The 1959 fire destroyed the remaining power held by the group, and in the fire's aftermath the other organizations "gone into eclipse." Of all of the organizations present in the third Chinatown, the Freemasons were the only one that rebuilt within the Chinatown.

In the 1960s Port Alberni had a locality association, also called the Yu-shan Hui-guan with the same Cantonese name and with the same purpose as the Nanaimo organization.

Prior to 1945 the Prince George Chinese Benevolent Association was established to raise support for China during World War II. In the 1960s Prince George also had a clan association, Zhi-de Tang (Chi Tak T'ong), described as the sole "significant political grouping" in the smaller British Columbia towns.

In the 1940s a benevolent association in Prince Rupert was established; it was, like the one in Prince George, created in order to give China support during the war.

== Employment and commerce ==
Historically Chinese people in British Columbia, by the early 20th century, worked in canneries, logging operations, sawmills, shingle mills, and other extractive jobs. This employment profile differed from that of ethnic Chinese in other parts of Canada, who often only took employment in restaurants and laundries.

The tax registers of the City of Victoria show that Chinese businessmen were, after the Governor and coal-baron Robert Dunsmuir, the wealthiest men in the new city. Many of these were labour-contractors, a sector which would grow exponentially in the railway era, and opium merchants.

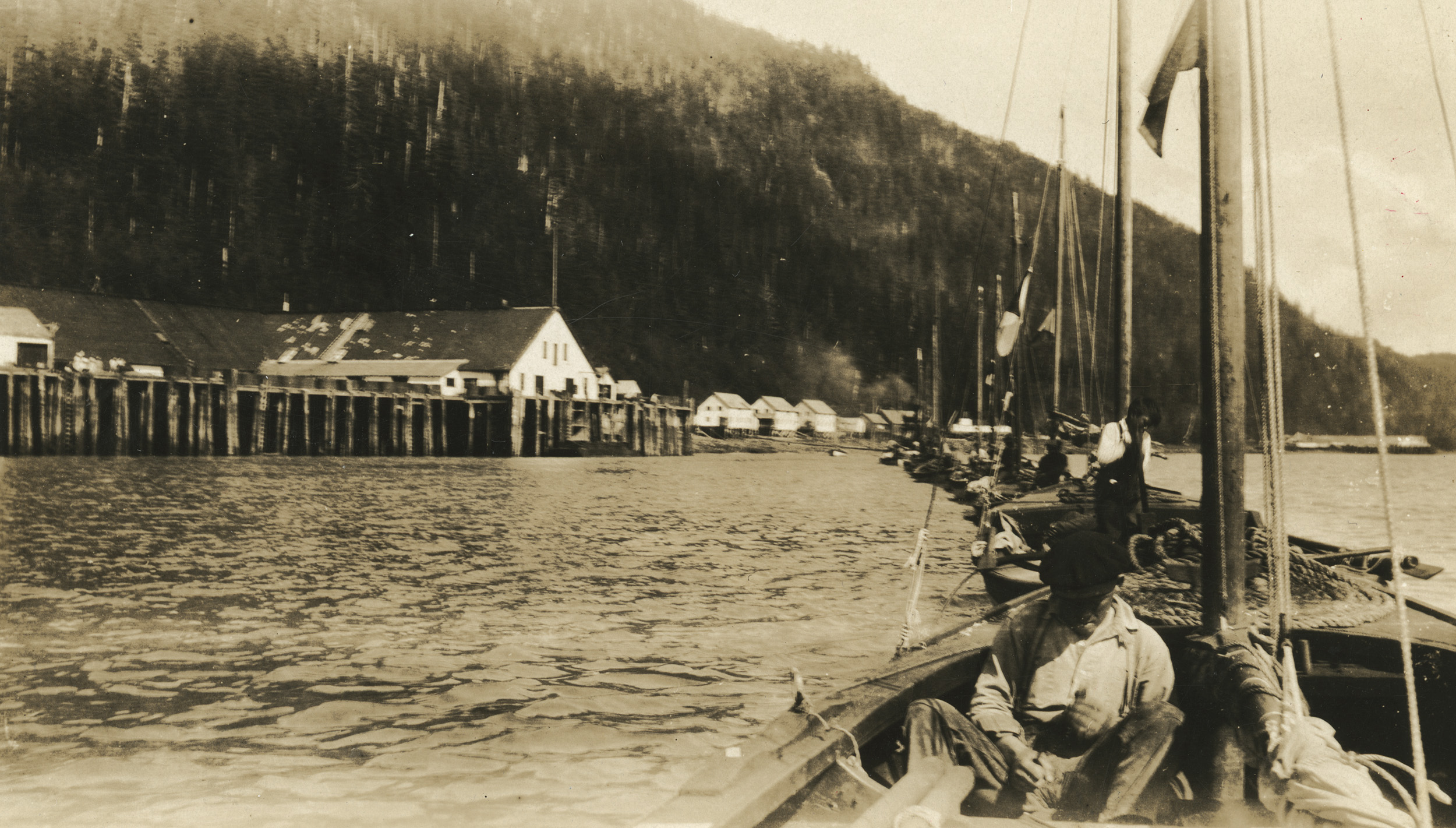
View of fishing boats moored near the North Pacific Cannery.

=== Pacific Salmon-Canning Industry ===
Salmon-canning on British Columbia's (BC) west coast was a key factor in the Industrialization of the province. The industry's rapid expansion over the turn of the nineteenth century was sustained by the contributions of Chinese labourers. In the 1850s, the industrial development of British Columbia offered young migrant Chinese men the opportunity to seek work away from the desperation ravaging their communities as a result of Western imperialist expansion. By 1900, roughly six thousand Chinese men were employed in canneries across the province.

In 1885, the Department of Indian Affairs noted Indigenous agitation over labour displacement due to increased competition with Chinese men for employment in cannery plants and private domestic services. Chinese workers were preferred labourers because unlike the Indigenous workers who had a limited means to subsistence and close community engagement, the Chinese were more easily subordinated in their isolation from home and family, with little assurance as to when they will return. This shift was felt less on the North Coast as Indigenous communities still lived in close proximity to the canneries and it was expensive to transport workers from the south of the province.

==== "China Bosses" and "Chinese Contracts" ====
The subordination felt by Chinese Labourers was partly facilitated by the system used to contract and manage Chinese crews. Chinese middlemen called "China Bosses" were in charge of contracting out Chinese labour to the canneries. This specific type of relationship between contractor and labourer originated in China, specifically from the region of Canton where the majority of workers migrated.

These Chinese bosses often worked out of employment agencies in Vancouver. They organized Chinese labour and supervised the workers on the job; the bosses also began to contract female Indigenous work in the canning plants. Once passages, food, and overhead were taken care of, the crews were paid in accordance with the number of cans produced, the amount of fish butchered, and the type of piece-work assigned. In this way, the contractors alleviated the cannery management of any burden of financial loss as a result of poor runs and short seasons. Similarly, the contractor rarely incurred financial loss as unexpected expenses could be mitigated by restricting spending in other areas such as food.

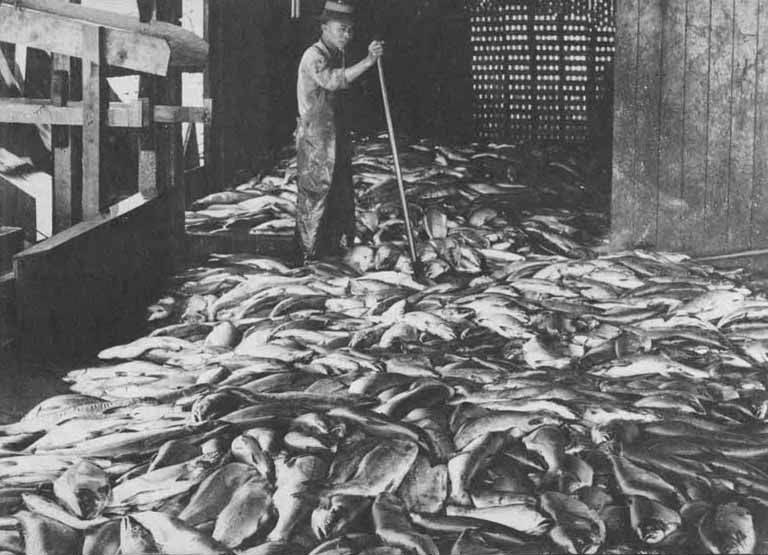
Salmon Catch on floor of cannery with Chinese sorter, 1900 (WA).

==== Canning Plants ====
"Everything," was the reply of local New Westminster fisherman, David Melville, when asked in front of the British Columbia Fishery Commission what kinds of jobs the Chinese performed for the canneries. The Chinese workers both opened and closed the fishing season: crews were transported up the rivers when the ice started to melt around April to make cans and prepare for the pack; the same crews marked the season end by casing the pack for shipment. During the season, Chinese men and boys and native women and children worked in the plants processing the fish.

The segregation of cannery labour was an imperative of the industry as racially distinct groups of labourers were assigned biological and cultural predispositions that determined the type of labour they were meant to perform. The duties of cutting and packing the fish were seen as befitting Chinese men and Indigenous women's predispositions; whereas, Indigenous, European, and Japanese men were seen as conditioned to the job of fishing. This feminization of Chinese labour was consistent with dominant colonial perceptions of masculinity, where whiteness was synonymous with maleness and the racial Other was feminized. Japanese men were seen to possess the necessary skills and strengths that the role of fisherman necessitated.

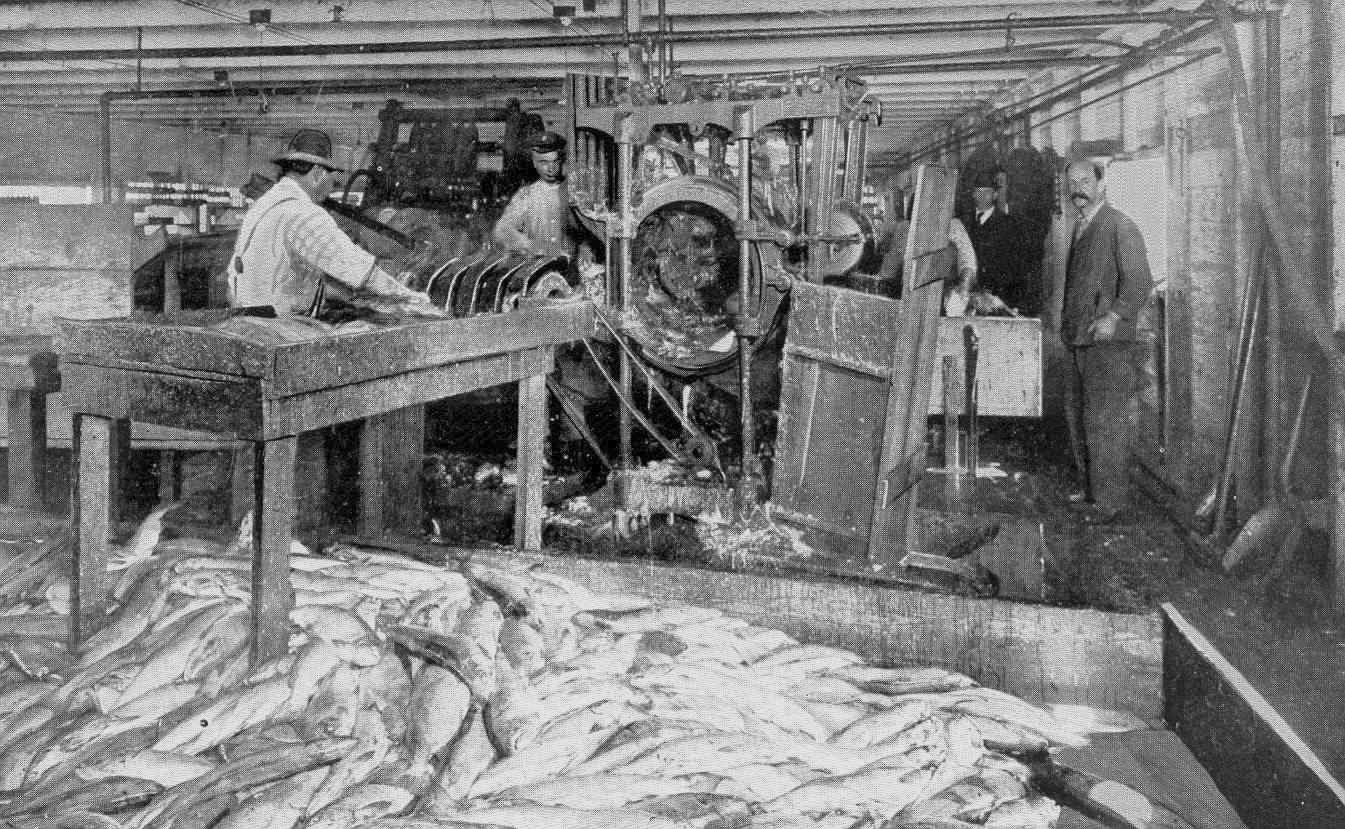
"The Iron Chink" pictured in salmon cannery in BC early 20th century.

===== Mechanization =====
Competition for labour in the cannery plants resulted in increased wages for individual Chinese labourers. This labour shortage was exasperated over the years as restrictive immigration policy and anti-Asiatic sentiment mounted. In 1885, the Federal government restricted Chinese immigration to Canada through the exorbitant Chinese Head Tax. Similarly, in 1907, the Asiatic Exclusion League was created in BC to resist what some saw as an Asian takeover of white jobs.

Mechanization in the canning industry was viewed by operators as a possible means through which to resolve the increasing cost of Chinese labour. By 1907, the only machine produced specifically for the canning industry was in full operation: The "Iron Chink." This mechanized fish processing line was employed to replace the skilled hands of Chinese butchers. More than this, and as its derogatory name implies, the mechanical butcher emphasized a tension in an industry where profit necessitated an interracial labour system, while the colonial ideal of the expanding European settler population called for racial homogeneity.

Mechanization in BC's salmon canning-industry had a marginal effect on the Chinese labour force. The desire for a quality product, paired with the remoteness of many northern canneries, ensured the persisting requirement for hand packed salmon in BC.

==== Unionization ====
Before the Second World War, resistance against the unfair treatment of marginalized labour forces in the industry was localized and contained. After the War, Fishermen pushed for an industrywide union, which required the participation of plant workers. This is not to say that Chinese labourers were incapable of unionizing independently, as evinced by the formation of the Chinese Cannery Employees' Union in 1904, to battle unethical contractors.

The United Fishermen and Allied Workers Union (UFAWU) was founded in 1945 by fishermen and Communist Party organizers. In 1947 the first agreements covering Chinese cannery workers were signed. The Chinese Cannery Workers' supplement of the union agreements reflected the lower end of the pay grade. In addition, UFAWU's call to eradicate the Chinese contract system resulted in the effective elimination of Chinese from the industry. The severity of this consequence was aided by the Chinese Immigration Act of 1923 which prevented Chinese from entering Canada.

==== Conclusion ====
Chinese labourers were essential to the realization of BC's emerging industrial economy and Chinese contributions to the salmon-canning industry were indispensable to its success. Prior to the beginning of World War II, Chinese cannery workers found employment through a system managed by contract bosses, which left the workers vulnerable to abuses and financial loss. These workers were also subject to oppression and racism as reflected in the racially segregated work environment and the poor wages offered. Union agreements which developed after the Second World War did not resolve these issues, rather they worked concurrently with racist, government immigration policy to effectively remove the Chinese from the very industry they made possible.

== Media ==
The Chinese Reform Gazette (Rixin Bao), published by the Vancouver branch of the Chinese Empire Reform Association, was Canada's first ever Chinese language newspaper. It argued in favor of Kang Youwei's ideas of governance.

The Xinminguo Bao (the New Republic) of Victoria, a daily newspaper first published in 1912, was the first pro-1911 Revolution newspaper published in Canada. It was published after Sun Yat-sen ordered its creation; members of the Tongmenghui Victoria office took the Jijishe ("Striking Oar Society"), a newsletter published on an irregular basis, and converted it into the Xinminguo Bao. Jijishe was previously published by the organization of the same name; that organization had collapsed in 1909.

As of 2009, of all of the major ethnic categories in Vancouver, the Chinese had the second-highest number of media products. Three Chinese language daily newspapers, Ming Pao, Sing Tao and World Journal cater to the city's large Cantonese and Mandarin-speaking population.

The Vancouver Sun operates Taiyangbao (simplified Chinese: 太阳报; traditional Chinese: 太陽報; pinyin: Tàiyáng Bào), a Mandarin-language version of their regular newspaper. The English language edition of the Epoch Times, a global newspaper affiliated with Falun Gong, is distributed through free boxes throughout the metropolis.

Historical Chinese-language papers in Vancouver include the Chinese Times, Chinese Voice, and New Republic.

== Politics ==
When Vancouver was founded in 1886, its charter stated that municipal elections would not have First Nations and Chinese voters. R.H. Alexander, the operator of the Hastings Mill, asked his Chinese employees to vote anyway but they were chased away from the polls by whites. These men were supporters of David Oppenheimer, a rival candidate who was to become the city's second mayor. Alexander, at the time, was making an unsuccessful bid for the Mayor of Vancouver.

In the early 20th century, Chinese politicians opposing the Qing Dynasty status quo, including Sun Yat-sen, Kang Youwei, and Liang Qichao, visited British Columbia to obtain support for their respective political movements. The Chinese Empire Reform Association (CERA (Note: In Chinese: 保救大清光緒皇帝會 Bǎo Jiù Dà Qīng Guāngxù Huángdì Huì "Protecting and Saving Great Manchu Guangxu Emperor Association", or Baohuanghui 保皇會 Bǎo Huáng Huì in short))), an organization asking for reform of the Chinese political system, was established on July 20, 1899 by businesspersons Lee Folk Gay and Chue Lai and officially opened by Kang Youwei. The Vancouver branch opened on July 24 of that year; Won Alexander Cumyow was one of the people who opened that branch. In 1906 Kang Youwei and Liang Qichao changed the name of CERA after the Qing Dynasty government announced that it would establish a constitutional monarchy. The new name was Constitutional Party (Note: In Chinese: Digu Xianzhengdang)). In the early 20th century Chinese political activity shifted to Vancouver as its Chinese population became larger than those of other cities. Victoria, which prior to the early 20th century had a larger Chinese population than Vancouver, was no longer the centre of the Chinese political movements, but for a period political leaders in Vancouver were also active in Victoria. According to "Chinese and Canadian Influence on Chinese Politics in Vancouver, 1900–1947" author Edgar Wickberg, Victoria maintained "a kind of "associate" status" in the Chinese Canadian political arena until 1947.

The Jijishe, a pro-Sun Yat-sen organization in Victoria, had been established by young people in 1907 and collapsed in 1909 when the founders departed to Victoria to look for employment. The founders of Jijishe included Seto Ying Sek, Wu Shangying, and Wu Zihuan. It published a newsletter of the same name.

The Tongmenghui (Revolutionary Alliance)'s Victoria branch was first established by Sun Yat-sen in 1910, and Sun had established branches in other cities in Canada. After the 1911 revolution, the Tongmenghui became the Kuomintang, and accordingly, the Victoria office became the KMT Victoria District. In 1919 the Chinese Nationalist League of Canada, another pro-Sun Yat-sen organization, had branches in Victoria and Vancouver. The KMT's influence in British Columbia dwindled after the end of the Chinese Civil War in 1949.

In 1957 Douglas Jung, from Vancouver, was first elected to the Parliament of Canada; he was the first Chinese Canadian to serve on the parliament. In 1962 Jung lost his election. Art Lee, also from Vancouver and elected in 1974, was the second Chinese Canadian in Parliament.

Peter Wing, the first North American mayor of Chinese ancestry, was elected Mayor of Kamloops in 1958.

In 2022, Ken Sim defeated the incumbent mayor Kennedy Stewart during the election and became the first Chinese Canadian mayor of Vancouver. In the meantime, Simon Yu won the election and became the first Chinese Canadian mayor of Prince George.

== Education ==
The Victoria Chinese Public School (CPS (Note: Chinese: 域多利華僑公立學校; pinyin: Yùduōlì Huáqiáo Gōnglìxuéxiào)) was established as the Imperial Chinese School (Note: Chinese: 大清公立學校; pinyin: Dà Qīng Gōnglìxuéxiào)) in 1909. Xu Jianzhen, the Consul-General of China in San Francisco, had officially opened the school. The Victoria School Board had a policy denying enrollment to China-born pupils that was enacted in 1908 and other schools for China-born students were overcrowded. In 1913 the school began offering classes during the daytime for Chinese students according to an agreement with the Victoria School Board, and it officially changed its name at the same time. The new daytime classes served students who were segregated in public schools.

In the early 20th century, the Chinese-language schools in Victoria were the CPS, the Oi-kwok Hok-tong School, and the Jing'e School. In Vancouver there were several schools: the Wenhua Xuexiao, the Chinese Public School of Vancouver, the Jinhua School, the Kwong Chi School, the Canton School (Guangdong Xuexiao), and two other schools. There was also the Oi-kwok Hok-tong School in New Westminster.

Chinese parents and the Victoria CBA organized a system of alternative schools and started boycotting when, in 1922, the Victoria public school system announced plans to segregate Chinese students. The protests forced the Victoria school board to withdraw its segregation plans.

== Culture ==
British Columbia cities which host Chinese cemeteries include Cumberland, Duncan, Kamloops, Nanaimo, Prince George, Vernon, and Victoria. In the 1880s Kamloops' Chinese Cemetery opened. Victoria's cemetery at Harling Point, first established in 1902 and containing the graves of over 1,000 people, was in 1996 declared a National Historic Site.

In 1913 the Han Yuen Club, a recreational club founded by members of the Kuomintang Victoria district, was established.

Chinese British Columbians used the term Gold Mountain, normally used for and coined in relation to the California goldfields, for British Columbia. The Chinese Benevolent Association's records in Barkerville used "the Colonies of T'ang [China]" in their documents and correspondence.

== Notable Chinese from BC ==
- Need more references on female Chinese Canadians on this list.
- Caleb Chan, businessman and son of the late Chan Shun. Donated $10 million to fund UBC's Chan Centre for the Performing Arts
- Christian Chan, son of Caleb Chan. Philanthropist. Board of Trustee of the Vancouver Art Gallery.
- Tom Chan, Vancouver based real estate entrepreneur, brother of Caleb Chan and son of the late Chan Shun. Donated $10 million to fund UBC's Chan Centre for the Performing Arts.
- Tung Chan, former CEO of S.U.C.C.E.S.S. and Vancouver city councillor
- Denise Chong, economist and non-fiction writer; best-selling memoir The Concubine's Children
- Wayson Choy, award-winning novelist and memoirist. Passed away.
- Jim Chu, Chief Constable of the Vancouver Police Department
- Chu Lai, businessman and one of the earliest Chinese-Canadian merchants in British Columbia
- Won Alexander Cumyow, civil servant and lawyer, the first Chinese to be born in Canada
- Thomas Fung, founder of the Fairchild Group
- David Ho, businessperson
- Chow Dong Hoy aka C.D. Hoy, a Quesnel photographer, commemorated on a stamp from Canada Post.
- Terry Hui, Concord Pacific Group
- Douglas Jung, first Chinese MP
- Jenny Kwan, activist, politician and former provincial cabinet minister. Member of Parliament (MP) for Vancouver East.
- Larissa Lai, writer and literary critic
- David Lam, philanthropist and later Lieutenant Governor of BC
- Evelyn Lau, writer; best-selling memoir Runaway turned into a film starring Sandra Oh
- Art Lee, MP
- Richard Lee, member of the Legislative Assembly of British Columbia
- Robert H. Lee, Vancouver-based businessman, Chairman and Founder of Prospero. Robert H. Lee Graduate School is named in honor of his philanthropy.
- Sky Lee, writer and artist; novel Disappearing Moon Cafe often cited as first Chinese-Canadian novel
- Sook-Yin Lee, broadcaster, musician, actor, director
- Shin Lim, card magician
- Linda Ann Loo, Judge of the Supreme Court of British Columbia
- David Y.H. Lui (OC), Canadian-born arts impresario and producer, well known for developing the arts in Vancouver.
- Ken Sim, mayor of Vancouver
- Sid Chow Tan, long time Chinese Head Tax redress campaign leader. President of the Head Tax Families Society. Media producer and director. Passed away 2022.
- Madeleine Thien, internationally acclaimed novelist; Do Not Say We Have Nothing won the Governor-General's Award and Giller Prize, shortlisted for Booker Prize; born and raised in Vancouver, lives in Montreal
- Fred Wah, poet, critic, editor, and writer of short fiction; Canadian Parliamentary Poet Laureate.
- Chow Shong "C.S." Wing, the first professional photographer in Quesnel
- Peter Wing, the first Chinese mayor in North America, served as the mayor of Kamloops.
- Wong Foon Sien, journalist and social activist
- Meena Wong, A long time environmentalist and community activist. President of West Coast Mental Health Network Society. Founder and president of Civic Engagement Network Society of Canada. She was the NDP candidate for Member of Parliament during the 2011 federal election. She was also the first female Chinese Canadian and the only female mayoral candidate in the 2014 municipal election in Vancouver. Her platform included the controversial but popular Vacant Property Tax, which has since been adopted in various forms by municipal, provincial and federal governments https://www.canada.ca/en/services/taxes/excise-taxes-duties-and-levies/underused-housing-tax.html#:~:text=The%20Underused%20Housing%20Tax%20is,owners%20of%20housing%20in%20Canada..
- Rita Wong, poet, environmental activist.
- Jim Wong-Chu, pioneering editor, poet, cultural organizer, and champion of Asian-Canadian literature; co-founded the Asian Canadian Writers' Workshop Society
- Paul Yee, writer and archivist
- Gabriel Yiu, politician
- Simon Yu, mayor of Prince George

== See also ==
- International Buddhist Temple
- Ling Yen Mountain Temple
- Chinatown, Victoria
- Historical Chinatowns in Nanaimo
- Chinese Canadians
- Taiwanese Canadians
- Hong Kong Canadians
- Chinese Canadians in Greater Vancouver
- Chinese Canadians in the Greater Toronto Area
- History of Chinese immigration to Canada
- Chinese head tax in Canada
- Royal Commission on Chinese Immigration (1885)
- Chinese Immigration Act of 1885
- Chinese Immigration Act, 1923
