= Historical Chinatowns in Nanaimo =

Nanaimo, British Columbia had four Chinatown sites beginning in the 1800s.

== First Chinatown ==
The first was a dock area in Downtown Nanaimo in proximity to the Canadian Pacific Railway (CPR) terminal that existed in the 1860s. This was on Victoria Crescent, and the Vancouver Coal Mining and Land Company (VCC) had constructed several structures that became the Chinatown housing. Tensions with Whites were minimized as the Chinatown was separated by the Commercial Inlet. 13 Chinese were in Nanaimo in 1867. There were 36 Chinese in Nanaimo by 1871. In 1874 there were 200 Chinese in the Chinatown; the city had incorporated that year. In 1877 300 people, 296 of whom were coal miners employed by the VCC, lived in the Nanaimo Chinatown and that of Wellington, which at the time was a separate community. 206 of the miners lived in Nanaimo and 90 lived in Wellington. A Chinatown appeared in South Wellington after the Dumsmuir, Diggle & Company (DDC) purchased a South Wellington coal mine in 1879.

In the initial stage of the Chinatown's development Yee Kee & Company, according to David Chuenyan Lai, author of Chinatowns: Towns within Cities in Canada, was "probably" the largest of the two to three stores serving Nanaimo's Chinatown. In 1882 there were now five stores. In addition the community had a tailor shop and two hand laundries, so it had a total number of eight businesses. Hong & Hing Company, an importer/exporter of Chinese goods that purchased them from Victoria and sold them to South Wellington and Wellington businesses, was the largest company.

== Second Chinatown ==
The Chinatown was relocated to an area near the Nanaimo city limits in 1884. Pamela Mar, an area historian, stated that Robert Dunsmuir's 1883 strikebreaking with Chinese scabs that had caused resentment among white miners and an influx of Chinese workers for the Esquimalt and Nanaimo Railway were two contributing factors behind the move. Mar also stated that the white business district needed more land and that it was going to use the land originally used for Chinatown. The second Nanaimo Chinatown became a part of the city limits in 1887. There were 228 Chinese in Nanaimo in 1891. 600 Chinese, most of whom were residents of Chinatown, resided in Nanaimo in 1901. This Chinatown became the third largest in the province, and the second largest on Vancouver Island after that of Victoria.

Chinese from Cumberland, Extension, Northfield, South Wellington, and Wellington patronized this Chinatown.

The second site had been abandoned because a fuel company that had acquired the land occupied by the second site had raised rents. Mah Bing Kee and Ching Chung Yung had purchased the site in 1908 and this resulted in the move.

Currently Bayview Elementary School occupies the site of the second Chinatown.

== Third and fourth Chinatowns ==
The third site opened along Pine Street in 1908. It opened on an 8 acres (3.2 ha) site in the outlying areas of Nanaimo, and was initially purchased by the Lund Yick Land Company (Chinese: 聯益公司, pinyin: Liányì Gōngsī, Cantonese: Lyun-Yik Gung-Si), the name in Chinese means "Together We Prosper"). Chinatown began declining in the 1920s due to a decline in the coal mining industry. A satellite Chinatown opened on MacLeary Street in the 1920s. Land Yick began failing. Rising China Holding Company (Chinese: 華興實業公司; pinyin: Huáxīng Shíyè Gōngsī, Cantonese: Wa-Hing Shat-ip Kung-Sz), an all-Chinese, nonprofit agency, was formed. It purchased the Chinatown after receiving 4,000 shares of stock that had been purchased by ethnic Chinese. This act prevented remaining Chinese businesses from going into receivership.

There were 298 Chinese in Nanaimo in 1941. On September 30, 1960 the third Chinatown was destroyed by a fire. 200 persons lost their houses, and most of those affected were senior citizens.

== See also ==
- International Buddhist Temple
- Ling Yen Mountain Temple
- Chinatown, Victoria
- Chinese Canadians in British Columbia
- History of Chinese immigration to Canada
- Chinese head tax in Canada
- Royal Commission on Chinese Immigration (1885)
- Chinese Immigration Act of 1885
- Chinese Immigration Act, 1923
