= Moving the Mountain (1993 film) =

- Directed by: William Ging Wee Dere; Malcolm Guy
- Written by: William Ging Wee Dere
- Produced by: Malcolm Guy
- Cinematography: Steven Griffiths
- Edited by: Meiyen Chan
- Music by: Janet Lumb
- Release date: 1993
- Running time: 85 minutes
- Country: Canada
- Languages: English; Chinese

Moving the Mountain is a 1993 Canadian documentary film on the effects of the head tax and Chinese Exclusion Act in Canada. The film debuted at the Toronto International Film Festival in 1993 was co-directed by William Ging Wee Dere and Malcolm Guy, written by William G.W. Dere and produced by Productions Multi-Monde of Montreal.
