= Chu Lai (businessman) =

Chu Lai (1847–1906) was a businessman from Panyu, China, who migrated to British Columbia in 1860.

== Biography ==
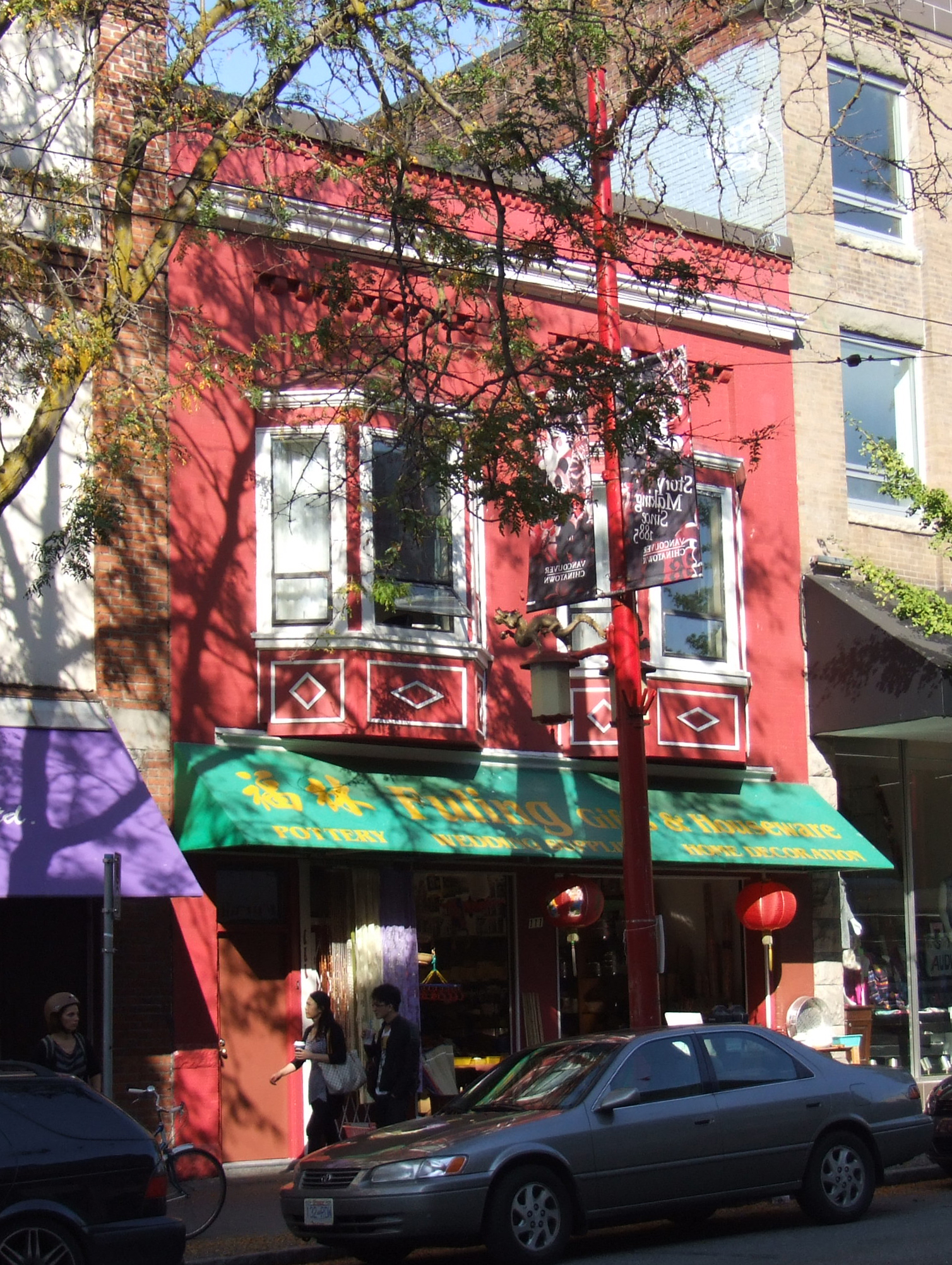
111 East Pender Street, Vancouver; Built in 1903 by Chu Lai. It is now a National Historic Site.

Chu Lai was a member of the Hakka minority group in southern China. He saw financial success during the Cariboo Gold Rush, which he used to open the Wing Chong Company in Victoria. This store was for import/export of manufactured clothing, and was a headquarters for labour contracting. Wing Chong also assisted new migrants to BC by help finding housing and offering remittance services. Lai's store in Victoria acted as a community centre for other Hakka people in the province.

Chu Lai defied Canada's Chinese Immigration Act, 1885 in 1885, by refusing to pay the annual $10 tax placed on every Chinese over the age of 14 in Canada. Lai was charged and convicted for failing to pay the tax, but refused to pay the $20 fine. Instead, Lai posted a bond of $250 to the BC Supreme Court where the act was challenged and ultimately dropped.

He was considered to be one of the wealthiest Chinese merchants in British Columbia. In 1876 he opened a general store selling all sorts of Chinese products. The Wing Chong Company was the largest employer of Chinese workers and artisans. Chu Lai had no difficulty finding employees because his store was a meeting-place for Chinese immigrants.

He was married to four women, two in China and two in Canada. This arrangement was, according to historians, to facilitate the administration of his business on two continents.

In 1885, Chu and another Chinese were accused of not having paid their annual $10 tax, which the Chinese Regulation Act had levied on all Asiatic adults in the province. Chu appealed to the British Columbia Supreme Court, which found that the tax was beyond the powers of the province. Chu Lai played an important role in the education of Chinese in the province, in protesting against the creation of a separate school system for the Chinese. During his lifetime, he was not well known among white Canadians. It was his funeral that interested the British press:

"The impressive funeral to which Chu Lai was entitled showed that he had entered the elite of the Chinese community."

Lai died in 1906. At this time, he was serving as the vice-president of the Chinese Empire Reform Association (CERA). CERA organized a funeral for Lai where they commissioned every carriage in the city of Victoria and hired a military marching band and professional mourners.

== Sources ==
- T. J. Stanley, "Chu Lai" at Dictionary of Canadian Biography online
