= Royal Commission on Chinese Immigration =

Canadian commission of inquiry into Chinese immigration

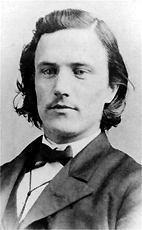
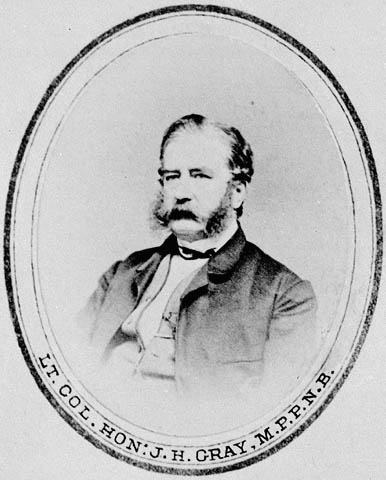
- Commissioners Joseph-Adolphe Chapleau and John Hamilton Gray
- Date: 1884-85
- Commissioners: Joseph-Adolphe Chapleau and John Hamilton Gray
- Ordered by: John A. Macdonald
- Aftermath: Chinese Immigration Act of 1885; Chinese head tax

The Royal Commission on Chinese Immigration was a commission of inquiry appointed to establish whether or not imposing restrictions to Chinese immigration to Canada was in the country's best interest. Ordered on 4 July 1884 by Prime Minister John A. Macdonald, the inquiry was appointed two commissioners were: the Honorable Joseph-Adolphe Chapleau, LL.D., who was the Secretary of State for Canada; and the Honorable John Hamilton Gray, DCL, a Justice on the Supreme Court of British Columbia.

The commissioners heard from 51 witnesses who submitted their testimonies to 27 questions regarding Chinese immigrants in Canada, and what policies should or should not be implemented to restrict them. Each of these witnesses gave their accounts and the commissioners gathered their answers to draw upon for their conclusions. However, a majority of their interviews were concentrated in Victoria rather than in the countryside where Chinese men competed for jobs, and many felt that this lost credibility for the report. Although they did venture to other cities, like Nanaimo and New Westminster, none of the voices from those cities make it into the final report. (They held interviews in some locations in the United States as well, notably San Francisco and Portland.)

Submitting their final report in 1885, the commissioners concluded that there was little evidence to support the claims made against Chinese immigration. According to them, the Chinese were judged by unfair standards and subject to broad generalizations about their character and habits. Despite the lack of proof against the threat of Chinese immigration to Canada, the report recommended moderate legislation to restrict such immigration.

== Background ==
In the 1880s, around 15,000 labourers from China came to Canada to work on the western section of the Canadian Pacific Railway (CPR) in British Columbia. When the railroad was completed in 1885, Chinese labourers entered other industries like fishing and agriculture, or worked as domestic servants, among other things.

Though employers generally supported Chinese labour as it was cheap and reliable, the growing anti-Chinese sentiment and discrimination in the public sphere meant Prime Minister Macdonald could not ignore calls for the creation of anti-Chinese policies, particularly by politicians, trade unionists, and white residents.

While initially refusing to introduce such regulations out of recognition for the necessity of Chinese labour for the construction of the CPR, Macdonald eventually yielded to public dissatisfaction pressure when railway construction ended.

== Inquiry ==
Commissioners Joseph-Adolphe Chapleau and John Hamilton Gray collected evidence from Canada, the United States, and Australia relating to the effect of Chinese immigration on trade, social relations, and morality. Their survey of British Columbia's Chinese population lists 157 Chinese women (classified as wives, girls, and prostitutes) and 10,335 Chinese men.

The immigration policies of other countries were also examined by the commission, including the American Chinese Exclusion Act (1882), as well as the Chinese immigration laws in New Zealand (1881) and Victoria, Australia (1855), both of which levied a £10 poll tax on Chinese immigrants.

A majority of their interviews were concentrated in Victoria rather than in the countryside where Chinese men competed for jobs, and many felt that this lost credibility for the report. (They held interviews in some locations in the states as well, notably San Francisco, California, and Portland, Oregon.) The only testimonials from Chinese people were provided by two consular officials from San Francisco. Although they did venture to other cities, like Nanaimo and New Westminster, none of the voices from those cities make it into the final report.

They heard testimonies from 51 witnesses, most of whom gave negative reports, submitting their testimonies to 27 questions regarding Chinese immigrants in Canada. Each of these witnesses gave their accounts and the commissioners gathered their answers to draw upon for their conclusions.

While a majority of the witnesses gave negative testimonials about Chinese immigrants, some individuals were of the opinion that there were upsides to Chinese labour. William Babcock, a resident of San Francisco, gave an overall positive testimonial citing that Chinese labor was cheaper, and that they do not get involved with politics as they are intending to return to their own country after amassing some wealth. As well, in some jobs where there is a high turnover rate for servants, the Chinese labour force are reliable and tend to stay. Of the 20 respondents who believed that Chinese people had helped to develop the province, 10 believed that they had a negative impact. Regardless of a positive or negative impact, many who felt the Chinese had impacted provincial development felt that their presence was still needed, except for 3 people.

== Report and findings ==
The 731-page final report was submitted in 1885.

Each of the commissioners have their own personal reports in the commission. In Gray's personal report titled, "Respecting Chinese Immigration in British Columbia", he outlines the three distinct categories of public opinions on Chinese immigrants:

1. "Of a well-meaning, but strongly prejudiced minority, whom nothing but absolute exclusion will satisfy.
2. "An intelligent minority, who conceive that no legislation whatever is necessary – that, as in all business transactions, the rule of supply and demand will apply and the matter regulate itself in the ordinary course of events."
3. "Of a large majority, who think there should be moderate restriction, based upon police, financial and sanitary principles, sustained and enforced by stringent local regulations for cleanliness and the preservation of health.”

=== Conclusions ===
Despite anti-Chinese sentiments growing in Canada, Chapleau and Gray did not see Chinese immigration as a hindrance to British Columbia, instead viewing their labor as necessary. They did not suggest the outright exclusion of Chinese immigrants, rather they opted for the consideration of a $10 head tax upon arrival in Canada.

The commission found that the average Chinese labourer earned $300 annually and saved a modest $43 after living expenses. With the funds collected from the head taxes, the government could invest in a health inspector to be stationed at the ports of entry to examine the health of those who entered Canada, protecting against the spread of disease.

== Results and aftermath ==
Following the Royal Commission was the passing of the first Chinese Immigration Act on 20 July 1885, which looked at the recommendations made by Chapleau and Gray. A head tax of $50 was set, much higher than the $10 suggested in the commission, intending to be an obstacle for entry to Canada. The Chinese were the only group that was required to pay the head tax in Canada.

By 1902, the head tax evidently did not impede Chinese immigration—even after it doubled to $100. A second inquiry, the Royal Commission on Chinese and Japanese Immigration (1902), said that the Chinese were "unfit for full citizenship... They are so nearly allied to a servile class that they are obnoxious to a free community and dangerous to the state." It suggested the head tax be increased to $500, which was equal to around 2 years’ salary. The fee was established by Parliament in 1903.

== See also ==
- History of Chinese immigration to Canada
- Chinese head tax in Canada
