= Peter Wing =

North America's first mayor of Chinese descent

Peter Wing (traditional Chinese: 吳榮添; simplified Chinese: 吴荣添; pinyin: Wú Róngtiān; Jyutping: ng4 wing4 tim1), CM OBC (May 4, 1914 – December 27, 2007) was a Canadian politician and was the first mayor of Chinese descent in North America. He was born in Kamloops, British Columbia in 1914 and had lived most of his life there.

== Life ==
In 1910, Wing's father, Eng Wing Him, at age 16, went to Canada from the region near Canton. He went back to Canton to get married in the same year and returned to Canada in 1913. Peter Wing was born on May 4, 1914, in Kamloops. Wing had three brothers, John, Jim and David, and three sisters, May, Lily and Jean.

He studied at Stuart Wood School but left in grade nine to work for his father's restaurant and grocery store. He learned to play the piano by himself, and played a pump organ during Sunday services in the Chinese Methodist Mission on Victoria Street West. Afterwards, he joined the United Church choir. He was married to Frances Kwong (better known as Kim) of Revelstoke in 1932.

In 1934, he became the youngest member of the Kamloops Board of Trade. He worked as an orchardist and realtor. First elected as an alderman in 1960, he then served as mayor of Kamloops for three terms starting in 1966. During his term as mayor, Wing was also president of the Union of British Columbia Municipalities. Wing was also the first native-born mayor of Kamloops. On 27 December 2007, Wing died at the age of 93 in Vancouver from a stroke.

== Recognition ==
In 1976, he was made a Member of the Order of Canada and was awarded the Order of British Columbia in 1990. In 1999, the city of Kamloops renamed the Peter Wing Rotary Rose Garden in his honour.

== See also ==
- Chinese Canadians in British Columbia
