= Linda Ann Loo =

Canadian lawyer and judge (born 1947)

Linda Ann Loo (born 1947) is a retired Canadian lawyer and judge.

== Biography and career ==
Loo was born in 1947 in Vancouver, British Columbia, Canada. Loo finished undergraduate studies in 1971 and received her law degree from the University of British Columbia in 1974. She began practicing law as in-house counsel at BC Hydro where she practiced for 12 years. In 1986 Loo became an associate with the law firm Singleton Urquhart, later rising to the position as a managing partner of the firm. As a civil litigator Loo argued, and won a case before the Supreme Court of Canada.

She is also a former Law Society Bencher and Trial Lawyers Association of British Columbia Board member. On September 24, 1996, on the recommendation of the Lieutenant Governor of British Columbia David Lam and then Governor-General Roméo LeBlanc, Loo was appointed a justice of the Supreme Court of British Columbia. Madam Justice Linda A. Loo retired in 2018.
