= Kamloops Chinese Cemetery =

Cemetery in British Columbia, Canada

Coordinates: 50°40′42″N 120°21′35″W

- Interactive map of Kamloops Chinese Cemetery

Details
- Established: 1880s
- Location: 850 Lombard Street, Kamloops, British Columbia, Canada
- Find a Grave: Kamloops Chinese Cemetery

The enterance to Kamloops Chinese Cementary

Kamloops Chinese Cemetery is a burial ground for Chinese living in or near Kamloops, British Columbia, Canada. The cemetery opened in the 1880s in order to serve the Chinese population of Kamloops who were not allowed to be buried in Pioneer Cemetery, city's main cemetery.

== History ==
Chinese labourers began arriving in Kamloops in the 1880s, many hired to construct the Yale-Kamloops line of the Canadian Pacific Railway. Following the construction of the railway, many Chinese remained in Kamloops, forming a Chinatown which the cemetery served. In 1892, the plot of land was officially given to the Chinese community in Kamloops to use as a graveyard. The first burial at the site was first recorded in 1897.

In the 1970s, almost all grave markers within the cemetery were accidentally removed. City workers had come to clean up the site, aware that it was a cemetery, but without the of what the wooden stakes used were. Volunteers have since researched burials in the cemetery to recover names and place new wooden stakes with names inscribed.

The cemetery was registered an official historic site in 2009.
