= Chinese Immigration Act, 1923 =

Canadian 1923 immigration legislation

Parliament of Canada
- Enacted by: 14th Canadian Parliament
- Commenced: 1 July 1923
- Repealed: 14 May 1947

Repeals
- Chinese Immigration Act, 1922; Chinese Immigration Act, 1887; Chinese Immigration Act, 1885

Repealed by
- Canadian Citizenship Act, 1946
- Status: Repealed

The Chinese Immigration Act, 1923 (French: de l'immigration chinoise, 1923), also known as the "Chinese Exclusion Act" (the duration of which has been dubbed the Exclusion Era), was a Canadian Act of Parliament passed by the government of Liberal Prime Minister William Lyon Mackenzie King, banning most forms of Chinese immigration to Canada. Immigration from most countries was controlled or restricted in some way, but only the Chinese were completely prohibited from immigrating to Canada.

The act was repealed in May 1947 after World War II.

== History ==
Before 1923, Chinese immigration was heavily controlled by the Chinese Immigration Act of 1885, which imposed an onerous head tax on all immigrants from China.

After various members of the federal and some provincial governments (especially British Columbia) put pressure on the federal government to discourage Chinese immigration, the Chinese Immigration Act was passed. It went into effect on 1 July 1923. The Act banned immigrants of Chinese heritage from entering Canada except those under the following titles:

- Diplomat
- Foreign student
- "Special circumstance" granted by the Minister of Immigration under Article 9 of the Act (This is the class that former Governor General Adrienne Clarkson's family fell under.)
- Merchant

Because Canada became a signatory following World War II of the United Nations' Universal Declaration of Human Rights, with which the Chinese Immigration Act was inconsistent, the Canadian Parliament repealed the act on 14 May 1947 (following the proclamation of the Canadian Citizenship Act, 1946 on 1 January 1947). However, independent Chinese immigration to Canada came only after the liberalization of Canadian immigration policy under the governments of John Diefenbaker and Lester Pearson, first by the elimination of restrictions based on national origins in 1962, followed by the establishment of the world's first points-based immigration system in 1967.

Labour organizations were among the prominent voices calling for Chinese exclusion. The Trades and Labour Congress of Canada, along with the Retail Merchants Association of Canada and veterans' groups, publicly supported the passage of the act. In British Columbia, trade unions and veterans' associations argued that Chinese workers accepted lower wages, which they claimed limited employment opportunities for European Canadians, and used this as justification to pressure federal politicians toward race-based immigration restrictions.

== Redress and legacy ==
Since the 1 July Dominion Day holiday coincided with the enforcement of the Chinese Immigration Act, Chinese-Canadians at the time referred to the anniversary of Confederation as "Humiliation Day" and refused to take any part in the celebration.

On 22 June 2006, then-Prime Minister Stephen Harper apologized in the House of Commons. The first phrase of the apology was spoken in Cantonese Chinese. He announced that the survivors or their spouses would be paid approximately $20,000 in compensation for the head tax.

On 15 May 2014, then-Premier of British Columbia Christy Clark apologized in the Legislative Assembly. The apology motion was unanimously passed and aims to make amends for historic wrongs. Unlike the federal apology, no individual compensation was provided. However, $1 million was promised to be put into a legacy fund which would help legacy initiatives. The formal apology went through a three-month consultation period with various parties to help ensure that the apology was done properly.

On 22 April 2018, then-Mayor of Vancouver, British Columbia Gregor Robertson issued a formal public apology.

The Act and its legacy have been the subject of an acclaimed documentary film and work of historical fiction:

- Lost Years: A People's Struggle for Justice (2011) by Kenda Gee and Tom Radford
- The Red Tiger (2019) by Chuck Lim

The centenary of the bill's commencement was marked on 1 July 2023; a national remembrance ceremony was held by the Senate on 23 June, while proclamations and memorial ceremonies were held in communities such as Calgary and Halifax. The newly founded Chinese Canadian Museum in Vancouver also opened to the public that day.

== See also ==
- Chinese Exclusion Act
- Chinese head tax
- Immigration to Canada
- White Australia policy
- New Zealand head tax
