= Chinese Immigration Act, 1885 =

Canadian immigration legislation

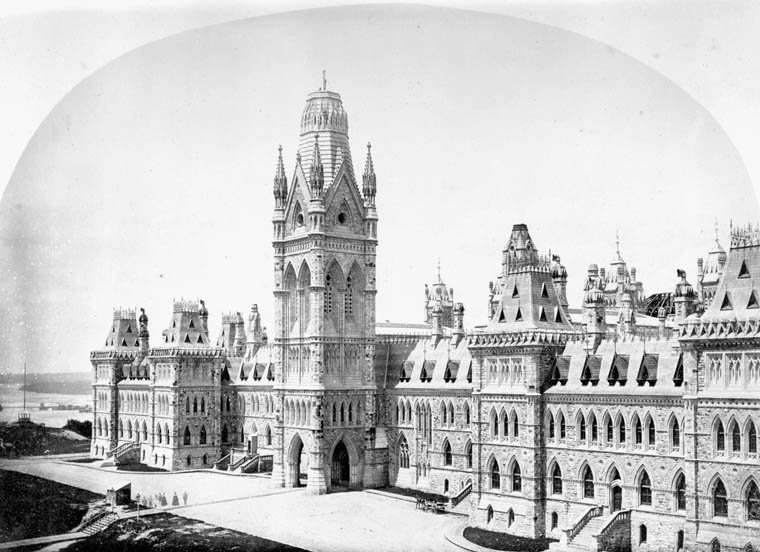
- Parliament of Canada buildings in 1885

Parliament of Canada
- Long title: An Act to Restrict and Regulate Chinese Immigration Into Canada
- Citation: SC 1885, c. 71
- Enacted by: Parliament of Canada
- Royal assent: 20 July 1885
- Repealed: 1 July 1923
- Introduced by: Joseph-Adolphe Chapleau

Amended by
- Chinese Immigration Act, 1887; Chinese Immigration Act, 1922

Repealed by
- Chinese Immigration Act, 1923

Related legislation
- Chinese Exclusion Act (US)
- Status: Repealed

The Chinese Immigration Act, 1885 was an act of the Parliament of Canada that placed a head tax of $50 (equivalent to $1,828 in 2025) on all Chinese immigrants entering Canada. It was based on the recommendations of the Royal Commission on Chinese Immigration, which were published in 1885.

It was granted royal assent on 20 July 1885, and followed the U.S. Chinese Exclusion Act, which was passed in 1882.

== History ==
In the early 1880s, during the construction of the Canadian Pacific Railway (CPR), as many as 17,000 Chinese immigrants came to Canada to work as labourers. Many individuals arrived from China, but others came from American states that included Washington, Oregon, and California, following their work on railroads and in mining camps. The arrival of the Chinese in Canada was partially the result of a demand for cheap labour in the West. Major labour shortages in British Columbia threatened the economic viability of Canada. Thus, as a way to bring the West economic efficiency, Chinese immigration was encouraged in the early 1880s. Furthermore, the CPR was formed to physically unite Canada, and industrialists desired cheap labour to complete its construction. Founded in 1881, the CPR was completed on 7 November 1885, "six years ahead of schedule, when the last spike was driven at Craigellachie, B.C." Following its completion, the demand for Chinese immigration decreased significantly.

Immigration to Canada also resulted from troubling political and social circumstances in China. Over 44,000 immigrants arrived in Canada between 1858 and 1923, most of whom were "male, relatively uneducated, and unskilled." Most Chinese immigrants during this period resided in the province of British Columbia, particularly in the cities of New Westminster and Victoria. In addition to their work on the CPR, early immigrants were employed in occupations that included mining, forestry, and fishing.

Although initially welcome in Canada, an increasing fear that immigrants would take jobs from Canadians, as well as a fear of Chinese people in general, resulted in the ostracization of the Chinese community and calls for immigration reform. They were also said to be "subject to loathsome diseases and demoralising habits" and considered to be an "unassimilable people." As a result of the public's distrust of Chinese immigrants, the province of British Columbia reconsidered their legal status between the years 1872 and 1885. In 1884, for example, British Columbia's Legislature attempted to "prevent their immigration, to impose an annual poll tax of $10, and to forbid their acquisition of Crown Lands."

=== Royal commission ===
Dissatisfaction with Chinese immigration grew, and in 1885, a royal commission was appointed to obtain proof that restricting Chinese immigration would be in the best interests of the country. Prime Minister John A. Macdonald originally refused to introduce prohibitive measures, but eventually yielded and appointed the commission. The Royal Commission on Chinese Immigration in 1885 interviewed hundreds of people with the goal of understanding the majority's view on Chinese immigration.

The commission was led by Joseph-Adolphe Chapleau and John Hamilton Gray, who gathered testimony regarding Chinese immigration at public hearings across British Columbia and compared these testimonies to those gathered on the Pacific Coast of the United States. The testimonies of 51 people were submitted. Only two Chinese witnesses were consulted: two officials from the Chinese Consulate in San Francisco. Multiple viewpoints were reported, including some in favour of Chinese immigration on an economic efficiency scale. However, the overall consensus on the state of Chinese immigration was a vocalized demand for its restriction. Claims against the Chinese were slanderous and were found to have little evidence behind them. Despite this, the commission recommended a moderate legislation against Chinese immigration and proposed a $10 head tax.

== Implementation ==
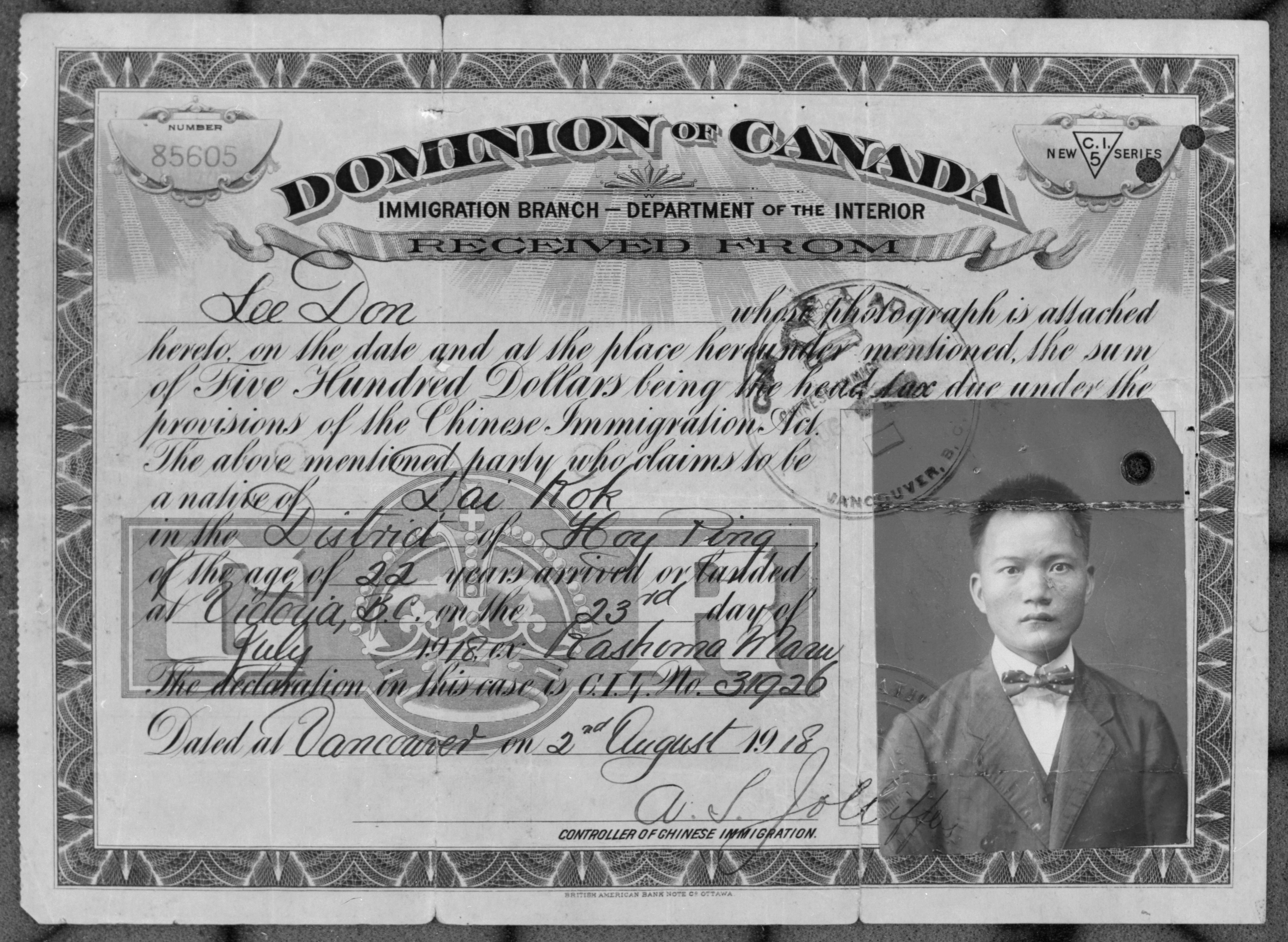
Chinese Immigration Act certificate issued on 2 August 1918

The act was enacted as a result of the findings of the commission. The act imposed a $50 head tax on Chinese immigrants, with the exceptions of diplomats, government representatives, tourists, merchants, scientists, and students. The imposed duty of $50 was a significant increase from the $10 duty recommended by the royal commission.

This piece of legislation became the first in Canada's history to exclude immigrants on the basis of their ethnic origin. It also defined "Chinese Immigrant" in section one as "The expression 'Chinese Immigrant' means any person of Chinese origin entering Canada and not entitled to the privilege of exemption provided for by section four of this Act." Furthermore, vessels that were transporting Chinese immigrants were permitted to only carry one Chinese immigrant per fifty tonnes of the ship's weight. This law also prevented any Chinese immigrant who suffered from a contagious disease, such as leprosy, or any Chinese woman who was known to have been a prostitute. Therefore, the act limited the number of Chinese immigrants to the extent that a 300-ton ship could only carry six Chinese immigrants to Canada.

The act was amended in 1887 to allow Chinese women who were married to non-Chinese men to enter Canada, as well as Chinese passing through Canada via the railway. An additional amendment in 1892 required Chinese residents of Canada who wished to temporarily leave the country to register with an immigration official prior to their departure.

In 1900, the head tax was raised to $100 by Prime Minister Wilfrid Laurier, due to a still growing influx of Chinese immigrants. In 1903, this was further raised to $500, "An equivalent of two years' wages for a Chinese labourer." Companies in short supply of cheap labour would often advance this money to bring Chinese immigrants to Canada.

The act was eventually superseded in 1923 by the Chinese Immigration Act, 1923, also known as the "Chinese Exclusion Act", which banned Chinese immigration entirely.

== Aftermath and legacy ==
Following the implementation of the act, prejudice against the Chinese grew across Canada. During the 1890s, for example, labour organizers in cities that included Quebec City, Montreal, and Toronto objected to Chinese immigration. Numerous riots occurred across the country to protest the presence of Chinese people in economic and social settings. In 1887, a riot occurred in Vancouver in protest of Chinese land clearing crews. In 1907, another riot occurred in Vancouver in which participants protested all Chinese immigration. Numerous Canadian provinces disenfranchised the Chinese or placed heavy restrictions on them in the late nineteenth and early twentieth centuries. The province of Saskatchewan disenfranchised them in 1908. The province of British Columbia placed various restrictions on them, including "Natal Acts," which incorporated a language test that was created to prevent the immigration of Chinese people to the province. Thus, the act contributed to anti-Chinese sentiment across Canada.

Although the Chinese Immigration Act, 1923 was repealed in 1947, restrictions remained in place during the 1950s and 1960s. For example, immigration remained limited to the wives of Chinese Canadian citizens and their unmarried children under the age of eighteen. Several notable Canadian politicians protested these policies. These included John Diefenbaker, a member of the Progressive Conservative party who was very supportive of human rights, and Stanley Knowles, a member of the CCF who protested the unequal treatment of the Chinese. As a result of protest against strict immigration regulations, during the late 1960s, the Canadian government altered their policies to include immigrants who were admitted to the country based on "their skills and the capital they had for investment" as opposed to their "family relationships."

In the 1980s, voices for redress emerged in the Chinese-Canadian community. Organizations that strove for promoting the rights of all individuals, particularly those of Chinese Canadians, encouraged their full and equal participation in Canadian society.

In the 1980s, the Chinese Canadian National Council, or CCNC, began to collect head tax certificates, and in 1984 "the CCNC presented the government with a list of names of 2,300 surviving Chinese who had each paid a head tax." A subsequent survey by the CCNC "found that of the 867 respondents who completed the questionnaire, forty-six percent were in favour of an official apology and a symbolic redress to the individual victims, while thirty-eight percent also supported some form of community redress." In 1990, the CCNC successfully lobbied for political endorsement for a redress. By 1993, a redress proposal was submitted to the representatives of five groups, including Chinese Canadians. At this time, the redress only offered an omnibus apology. The offer was rejected by the Chinese Canadian groups, and no resolutions were made that federal term.

As a result of the act and its imposed head tax, a redress, with apologies and compensations, took place only officially in 2006. After the election of the minority Conservative government in 2006, Stephen Harper affirmed his position on Chinese immigration:

Chinese Canadians are making an extraordinary impact on the building of our country. They've also made a significant historical contribution despite many obstacles. That's why, as I said during the election campaign, the Chinese Canadian community deserves an apology for the head tax and appropriate acknowledgement and redress.

Effective 29 August 2006, Canada's redress program combined "payments to individual head tax payers, (or, if the payer is deceased, to their spouse) with funding for educative and commemorative programs."

=== Significance ===
The act was tremendously important as a result of it being the first of its kind in Canada's history and subsequently laying down the foundations for future exclusionary policies and acts. The act laid down the legal framework for head taxes, which were later refined even more harshly. As such, immigration from China was greatly reduced until the 1940s.

The aim of establishing a "white" society for Canada, as Kenneth Munro explains, "such discrimination flew in the face of that crucial premise of Canadian nationhood, namely, respect for diversity of culture and traditions."

== See also ==
- Human rights in Canada
- Immigration
- Lost Years: A People's Struggle for Justice
- Moving the Mountain
- White Australia policy

== Bibliography ==
- Chang, Kornel (2012). American Crossroads : Pacific Connections : The Making of the U.S.–Canadian Borderlands. University of California Press. p. 45. ISBN 9780520271685.
