= Lost Years: A People's Struggle for Justice =

- Directed by: Kenda Gee; Tom Radford
- Written by: Kenda Gee; Tom Radford; Brenda Terning
- Produced by: Kenda Gee; Tom Radford
- Starring: Kenda Gee, Took Gee, Hanson Lau, Gim Wong, Larry Kwong, Norman Lim Kwong, Grant Din, Bettie Luke, Donnie Chin, Emmy Mah, Arthur Loo, Esther Fung, David Fung, Kirstin Wong, Loong Wong, William Dere, May Chiu, Walter Tom, Junaid S. Khan, Roderick A. Macdonald, Grace Chi, Constance Backhouse et al.
- Cinematography: Rene Jean Collins DoP; Grigori Ozerski
- Edited by: Brenda Terning; Perry Blackman; Brett Ardiel
- Music by: Darren Fung
- Production companies: Lost Years Productions, Inc.
- Distributed by: Lost Years Media, Inc.
- Release date: December 5, 2011
- Running time: 90 minutes
- Country: Canada
- Languages: English; Chinese; French

Lost Years: A People's Struggle for Justice (Chinese: 失去的岁月) is a 2011 documentary directed by Kenda Gee and Tom Radford. The film premiered on December 5, 2011, at the Guangzhou International Documentary Film Festival, where it won the Best Documentary Award for history and culture. The film also aired as a two-part, national television mini-series for the Canadian Broadcasting Corporation. A series of extended episodes subsequently aired on CTV Two Alberta, June 8 and 15, 2013, with repeat broadcasts on November 16 and 23.

Gee and Radford began work on the film in late 1999, taking twelve years to fully research the movie. Of the film, Gee and Radford stated that they were "originally inspired by the tale of Larry Kwong of Vernon".

== Synopsis ==
The documentary centres on the family story of director Kenda Gee and the last 150 years of the Chinese diaspora in Canada, the United States, New Zealand, and Australia. The movie begins documenting Gee's ancestors from 1910 China, further progressing through the years focusing on the racism that they and other Chinese emigrants experienced, and culminating with Hanson Lau and Gee's leadership in the campaign to redress the Chinese Head tax in Canada and abroad. The epic documentary follows "two journeys: one historical, in search of a new life; one modern, in search of justice." Lost Years features interviews with Chinese Canadians and Chinese emigrants such as Larry Kwong, the first Chinese Canadian to play in the NHL, Norman Kwong, former professional athlete and Lieutenant Governor of Alberta, and Gim Wong, decorated RCAF officer and Chinese head tax redress advocate, amongst others.

== Awards and nominations ==
Lost Years has been nominated for several awards, which includes the Golden Trailer Awards and Canadian Screen Awards. Director Kenda Gee has also received an Alumni Award of Excellence from the University of Alberta in recognition for his work with the documentary.

Award	Category	Recipient	Result
2013 Sichuan TV Festival	Special Jury Award – International Gold Panda Award for Best Documentary (Society)		Nominated
2013 International Film Festival Manhattan (Winner, 3 Awards)	Best of the Best; Best Documentary; Film Achievement & Social Advocacy		Won
2013 Golden Trailer Awards	Best Documentary Poster		Nominated
2013 Canadian Screen Awards (Finalist, 2 Nominations, excluding Canada Award Nomination)	Best Original Music for a Non-Fiction Program or Series, Best Sound in an Information-Documentary Program or Series		Nominated
2013 Asians on Films Festival Awards	Best Feature Documentary		Won
2012 Rhode Island International Film Festival	Best Feature Documentary Grand Award		Won
2012 IMP Awards	Honorable Mention		Won
2011 Guangzhou International Documentary Film Festival	Best Documentary Award and Prize for History and Culture		Won
2012 Yorkton Film Festival	Golden Sheaf Award for Best Multicultural		Nominated
2012 Park City Film Music Festival	Best Impact of Music in a Documentary		Nominated
2012 Seattle International Film Festival	Official Selection		Nominated
2012 Alberta Media Production Industries Association Awards (Finalist, 6 Nominations)	Best Documentary over 30 minutes, Best Cinematographer Non-Fiction Over 30, Best Editor Non-Fiction Over 30, Best Overall Sound Non-Fiction, Best Production Reflecting Cultural Diversity, Best Screenwriter Non-Fiction Over 30		Nominated
2012 Canadian Society of Cinematographers Awards	Robert Brooks Award for Documentary Cinematography		Nominated
