= Chinese head tax =

Canadian tax on Chinese immigrants

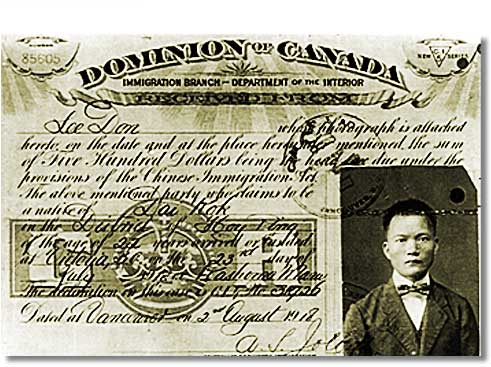
Head tax receipt. The head tax was introduced in 1885, as a means of controlling Chinese immigration.

The Chinese Head Tax was a fixed fee exclusively charged to Chinese persons entering Canada. The Head Tax was first levied after the Canadian parliament passed the Chinese Immigration Act of 1885, and it was designed solely to restrict Chinese immigration after the completion of the Canadian Pacific Railway (CPR), through the use of escalating fees. This policy was a state-sanctioned agreement meant to privilege and favour European settlers, while exploiting people of color and making it economically unfeasible for Chinese people to immigrate to Canada. It was a blatant demonstration of the “racial contract” at play, designed to uphold a white supremacy ideology and maintain a “White Canada”. Not only did the policy enforce the social separation of Chinese families and attempt to prevent the establishment of Chinese communities in Canada, but it created lasting effects on family structure and emotional well-being.

This policy marked a period of legislated anti-Chinese racism and reinforced a racial hierarchy in which White immigrants were viewed as superior, and Chinese immigrants were marked as a “subperson” class, deemed unfit for citizenship, yet welcomed only for cheap and disposable labor. The Electoral Franchise Act (1885) which disenfranchised Chinese immigrants, further cemented their racial and political inferiority. Alongside the Head Tax, various other pieces of discriminatory legislation were later imposed on Chinese people, limiting their economic opportunities, denying them equal rights, and eventually resulting in the Chinese Immigration Act of 1923, which outright prevented all Chinese immigration except for that of business people, clergy, educators, students, and some others. The legacy of this systemic discrimination persisted long after these acts were repealed, and continues to fuel modern-day conversations about anti-Asian racism in Canada.

== Tax ==
Through the mid- to late 19th century, some 17000 labourers were brought from China to do construction work on the Canadian Pacific Railway (CPR), though they were paid a third or a half less than their co-workers (about CA$1/day). Once the Canadian Pacific Railway was completed, the demand for cheap labour was non-existent, so the provincial legislature of British Columbia passed a strict law to virtually prevent Chinese immigration in 1885. However, this was immediately struck down by the courts as ultra vires ("beyond the powers") of the provincial legislative assembly, as it impinged upon federal jurisdiction over immigration into Canada. A similar attempt had been made a year before, and another one was made in 1878 to tax every Chinese over the age of 11 the sum of taxed $10 (equivalent to $402 in 2025) every three months.

Responding to the anti-immigration sentiment in British Columbia, the Canadian government of John A. Macdonald introduced the Chinese Immigration Act of 1885, which became law in 1885. Under its regulations, the law stipulated that all Chinese people entering Canada must first pay a CA$50 (equivalent to $1,828 in 2025) fee, later referred to as a head tax. This was amended in 1887, 1892, and 1900, with the fee increasing to CA$100 (equivalent to $4,021 in 2025) in 1900 and later to its maximum of CA$500 in 1903 (equivalent to $18,800 in 2025), representing a two-year salary of an immigrant worker at that time.

However, not all Chinese arrivals had to pay the head tax; those who were better off financially and presumed to return to China based on the apparent, transitory nature of their occupation or background were exempt from the penalty. These included arrivals identifying themselves as: students, teachers, missionaries, merchants, or members of the diplomatic corps.

The Government of Canada collected about CA$23 million ($411 million in 2025 dollars) in face value from about 81,000 head tax payers. The head tax did discourage Chinese women and children from joining their men, but it failed to meet its goal, articulated by contemporary politicians and labour leaders, of the complete exclusion of Chinese immigration. That was achieved through the same law that ended the head tax: the Chinese Immigration Act of 1923, which stopped Chinese immigration, but with certain exemptions for business owners and others. It is sometimes referred to by opponents as the Chinese Exclusion Act, a term also used for its American counterpart.

== Redress ==
After the Chinese Immigration Act was repealed in 1948, various community leaders including Wong Foon Sien campaigned for the federal government to open immigration policies for the Chinese community.

However, the concept of a redress movement did not begin until 1984, when Vancouver Member of Parliament (MP) Margaret Mitchell raised the issue of repaying the Chinese Head Tax for two of her constituents in the House of Commons of Canada after the Canadian Charter of Rights and Freedoms had been proclaimed and entrenched in the Constitution Act, 1982.

Over 4,000 other head tax payers and their family members were eventually registered by the Chinese Canadian National Council (CCNC) and its member organizations across Canada, after the issue gathered broad public attention on the CJVB radio program, Chinese Voice, hosted by Richmond, British Columbia, personality Hanson Lau in February 1984.

The redress campaign included holding community meetings, gathering support from other groups and prominent people, increasing the media profile, conducting research and published materials, making presentations at schools, etc.

In 1989, Chinese Canadian National Council, the longtime advocate for the head tax redress, suffered a split after the Tiananmen Square Massacre, which saw the formation of a competing group, the National Congress of Chinese Canadians (NCCC).

=== 1990s: preliminary negotiations ===
In 1993, Conservative prime minister Brian Mulroney made an offer of individual medallions, a museum wing, and other collective measures that would also include several other redress-seeking communities. These were rejected outright by the Chinese Canadian national groups.

However, in the same year, after Jean Chrétien became prime minister, the newly elected Liberal government openly refused to provide an apology or redress at all with the Multiculturalism Minister Sheila Finestone announcing in a letter, the following year, that the government "cannot rewrite history" and would not grant financial compensation or redress to groups for past injustices. Instead, the letter reaffirmed $24 million in financing for a Canadian Race Relations Foundation, an idea raised by the previous Conservative government.

The CCNC and a number of regional groups across Canada continued to raise the issue whenever they could, including a submission to the United Nations Human Rights Commission and undertaking court action against the Crown-in-Council, arguing that the federal Crown should not be profiting from racism, and that it had a responsibility under the Canadian Charter of Rights and Freedoms and international human rights law.

=== CA$1.2 billion legal challenge ===
In a CA$1.2 billion legal challenge led by the CCNC, it was argued that the apology and compensation for the internment of Japanese Canadians during the Second World War, offered by the government in 1988, established a precedent for redressing other racially motivated policies. However, the Ontario court declared in its 2001 decision that the Government of Canada had no obligation to redress the head tax levied on Chinese immigrants because the Canadian Charter of Rights and Freedoms had no retroactive application and the case of the internment of Japanese Canadians was not a legal precedent. Two subsequent appeals in 2002 and 2003 were also unsuccessful.

Following the legal setbacks, community activism resumed once again across the country. Several regional and national events had been organized to revitalize the redress campaign, including opening discussions with opposition parties, led by groups in Edmonton and Montreal, which later formed the Chinese Canadian Redress Alliance alongside the CCNC.

When Paul Martin won the leadership of the federal Liberal Party and became prime minister in 2003, there was a sense of urgency in the Chinese Canadian community as it became clear that there were perhaps only a few dozen surviving Chinese Head Tax payers left, along with potentially a few hundred spouses or widows.

=== 2004: recommendations and report of the United Nations rapporteur ===
In 2004, Doudou Diène, the United Nations special rapporteur on Racism, Racial Discrimination, Xenophobia and Related Intolerance, concluded that Canada should redress the head tax to Chinese Canadians in response to a submission by May Chiu, legal counsel to the Chinese Canadian Redress Alliance. The Report's recommendations once again drew national and international attention to the Chinese Canadian redress campaign. In 2005, Gim Wong, an 82-year-old son of two head tax payers and a World War II veteran, conducted a cross-country Ride for Redress on his Honda Gold Wing motorcycle, whereupon his arrival in Ottawa Prime Minister Paul Martin refused to meet him.

=== 2005: failed Bill C-333 ===
Chinese Canadian Recognition and Redress Act

Legislative history
- Bill title: Bill C-333
- Status: Not passed

On November 17, 2005, the National Congress of Chinese Canadians (NCCC) announced in a turn of events that an agreement had been reached between 11 of its member Chinese-Canadian groups and the federal Cabinet, wherein the Queen-in-Council would pay CA$12.5 million for the creation of a new non-profit foundation to educate Canadians about anti-Chinese discrimination, but with a specific pre-condition that no apology would be expected from the government.

The NCCC was formed on a platform of "no apology and no individual compensation," and was seen by many as the reason the Liberal government selected them as the representative group to negotiate the deal without any prior consultation with the Chinese Canadian community at large.

The Department of Canadian Heritage announced on November 24, 2005, that the agreed upon funding would be reduced to $2.5 million. It was later revealed that the Minister for Asia and Pacific Affairs, Raymond Chan, who claimed to have negotiated the deal, purposely misled both the ministers of the Crown and the public. Some of the groups named in the agreement later stated publicly that their names had been used without permission and in other cases, several other groups listed did not even exist.

The surprise Liberal agreement caused a great outcry in the Chinese Canadian community, as the purported deal with the NCCC had been conducted without their input, resulting in an escalation in the redress movement, nationwide.

Bill C-333, the Chinese Canadian Recognition and Redress Act, a private member's bill, was tabled in the federal parliament in order to implement the deal in November 2005. While C-333 purported to acknowledge, commemorate and educate about past government wrongdoings, it fell far short of the apology demanded by generations of Chinese Canadians. The Ontario Coalition of Head Tax Payers and Families lobbied the Conservative Party to stop the passage of Bill C-333. The Conservatives exercised a procedural prerogative and switched the order of Bill C-333 with Bill C-331, a bill to recognize past wrongs against Ukrainian Canadians during wartime, causing Bill C-333 to die when Prime Minister Martin's Liberals lost a motion of non-confidence and parliament was dissolved on November 28, 2005.

=== 2006: federal campaign and election ===
As they had done while campaigning for the federal election in 2004, the New Democratic Party and Bloc Québécois stated, during the leadup to the January 2006 election, their support for an apology and redress for the head tax. Similarly, on December 8, 2005, Conservative Party leader Stephen Harper released a press statement expressing his support for an apology for the head tax. As a part of his own party platform, Harper promised to work with the Chinese community on redress, should the Conservatives be called to form the next government. Before his party ultimately lost the election, Martin issued a personal apology on a Chinese language radio program. However, he was quickly criticized by the Chinese Canadian community for not issuing the apology in the House of Commons and for then trying to dismiss it completely in the English-speaking media on the very same day. Several Liberal candidates with significant Chinese-Canadian populations in their ridings, including Vancouver-Kingsway MP David Emerson and the Minister of State for Multiculturalism and Richmond MP Raymond Chan, also made futile attempts to change their positions in the midst of the campaign. Notably, Deputy Prime Minister and Edmonton Centre MP Anne McLellan lost her riding to Conservative MP Laurie Hawn.

=== Apology ===
The 2006 federal election was won by the Conservative Party, forming a minority government. Three days after the ballots had been counted on January 23, but before he had been appointed prime minister, Harper reiterated his position on the head tax issue in a news conference, that "the Chinese Canadian community deserves an apology for the head tax and appropriate acknowledgement and redress."

Early discussions on the form of apology and redress began on March 24, 2006, with a preliminary meeting between Chinese Canadians representing various groups (including some head tax payers), Parliamentary Secretary to the Prime Minister Jason Kenney, and Heritage Minister Bev Oda, resulting in the "distinct possibility" of an apology being issued before July 1, to commemorate the anniversary of the enacting of the Chinese Exclusion Act of 1923. The government's acknowledgement followed in the Speech from the Throne delivered by Governor General Michaëlle Jean on April 4.

That year, from April 21 to 30, the Crown-in-Council hosted the first, formal public consultations across Canada in cities most actively involved and responsible for the campaign: Halifax, Vancouver, Toronto, Edmonton, Montreal, and Winnipeg. They included the personal testimony of elders and representatives from a number of groups, among them the Halifax Redress Committee; the British Columbia Coalition of Head Tax Payers, Spouses and Descendants; ACCESS; the Ontario Coalition of Head Tax Payers and Families; the CCNC; the Edmonton HTEA Redress Committee of the Chinese Canadian Redress Alliance; and, the Montreal chapter of the Chinese Canadian Redress Alliance.

A number of the leading groups demanded meaningful redress, not only for the handful of surviving "head tax" payers and their widows or spouses, but first-generation sons and daughters who were direct victims, as recounted in the documentary Lost Years: A People's Struggle for Justice, proposing that the redress be represented (and limited) by each, actual "head tax" certificate brought forward by its surviving family members, or estate. Early demands from community groups for individual redress, ranged from $10,000 to $30,000 for the estimated 4,000 registrants.

On June 22, 2006, twenty-two years after the Chinese Canadian redress campaign began, Prime Minister Stephen Harper delivered an official apology to Chinese Canadians in the House of Commons for the first session of the 39th Parliament. During his address Harper spoke a few words in Cantonese, "Ga na daai doe heep" (Chinese: 加拿大道歉, 'Canada Apologizes'), breaking the parliamentary tradition of speaking either English and French in the House of Commons.

To the disappointment of many in the Chinese Canadian community, it was announced that only original head tax payers, or their surviving spouses, then in their nineties, or a total 785 claimants, would receive CAD$20,000 in individual redress, representing less than a fraction of one-percent of the 81,000 original head tax payers. Only an estimated 20 Chinese Canadians who paid the tax were still alive in 2006.

As no mention of further redress was made, the Chinese Canadian community continued to fight for redress from the Canadian government. A national day of protest was held to coincide with Canada Day 2006 in major cities across Canada, and several hundred Chinese Canadians joined in local marches.

== Documentaries ==
- Gee & Radford, Kenda & Tom (2011). "Lost Years: A People's Struggle for Justice" (Interviews head tax redress leaders). Lost Years Productions, Inc. Archived from the original on February 11, 2019.
- Cho, Karen (2004). "In the Shadow of Gold Mountain" (Interviews head tax survivors). Documentary film. National Film Board of Canada.
- Dere & Guy, William Ging Wee & Malcolm (1993). "Moving the Mountain: An Untold Chinese Journey". Archived from the original (Interviews head tax redress leaders) on November 17, 2011.

== See also ==
- Anti-Chinese legislation in the United States
- Chinese Canadian National Council
- Chinese Exclusion Act
- Internment of Japanese Canadians
- Lost Years: A People's Struggle for Justice
- New Zealand head tax (1881–1944)
- White Australia policy (1901–1973)
- Chinese head tax (Newfoundland) (1906–1949)
