= Chinese Canadians =

Canadians of Chinese ancestry

Chinese Canadians Sino-Canadiens (French)
Chinese Canadians as a percentage of census divisions' population in 2021
<1%
1–3%
3–5%
5–10%
10-20%
≥20%

Total population
- 1,713,163; 4.6% of the Canadian population (2021)

Regions with significant populations
- Greater Toronto Area, Greater Vancouver, Greater Calgary, Greater Montreal, Edmonton

Languages
- English, French, Cantonese, Mandarin, Min Chinese, Hakka, other varieties of Chinese

Religion
- Irreligion, Christianity, Buddhism, Chinese folk religions, Taoism

Related ethnic groups
- Hong Kong Canadians, Taiwanese Canadians, Overseas Chinese, Chinese Americans

Chinese Canadians
- Traditional Chinese: 華裔加拿大人
- Simplified Chinese: 华裔加拿大人
Transcriptions
Standard Mandarin
- Hanyu Pinyin: Huáyì Jiānádà Rén
Yue: Cantonese
- Yale Romanization: Wàhyeuih Gānàdaaih Yàhn

Alternative Chinese name
- Traditional Chinese: 加拿大華人
- Simplified Chinese: 加拿大华人
Transcriptions
Standard Mandarin
- Hanyu Pinyin: Jiānádà Huárén
Yue: Cantonese
- Yale Romanization: Gānàdaaih Wàhyàhn

Chinese Canadians are Canadians of full or partial Chinese ancestry, which includes both naturalized Chinese immigrants and Canadian-born Chinese. They comprise a subgroup of East Asian Canadians which is a further subgroup of Asian Canadians. Demographic research tends to include immigrants from Mainland China, Taiwan, Hong Kong, and Macau, as well as overseas Chinese who have immigrated from Southeast Asia and South America into the broadly defined Chinese Canadian category.

Chinese populations in Canada numbered 1.7 million people in 2021 and made up 4.7% of the total population of Canada. They were the second-largest racialized group in Canada after the South Asian populations. The size of the Chinese populations more than doubled from 1996 to 2021. In 2021, about half of Chinese populations in Canada were born in China and about half were born in other places. Chinese immigrants began settling in Canada in the 1780s. The major periods of Chinese immigration took place from 1858 to 1923, and indefinitely from 1947, reflecting changes in the Canada's immigration policy.

In 2021, over 6 in 10 individuals aged 25 to 54 years (61.8%) who reported being Chinese had a bachelor's degree or higher. In 2021, more than 8 in 10 individuals (84.5%) in Canada who reported being Chinese lived in a household that owned their home. Most Canadians of Chinese descent are concentrated within the provinces of Ontario and British Columbia.

== History ==
=== Pre-19th century ===
The first record of Chinese in what is known as Canada today can be dated back to 1788. The British fur trader John Meares hired a group of roughly 70 Chinese carpenters from Macau and employed them to build a ship, the North West America, at Nootka Sound, Vancouver Island, British Columbia. This was then an important European outpost on the Pacific coast, disputed between Spain and Britain. The British post was seized by Spain, and thereafter was abandoned by Meares. The later fortunes of the Chinese carpenters went unknown.

=== 19th century ===
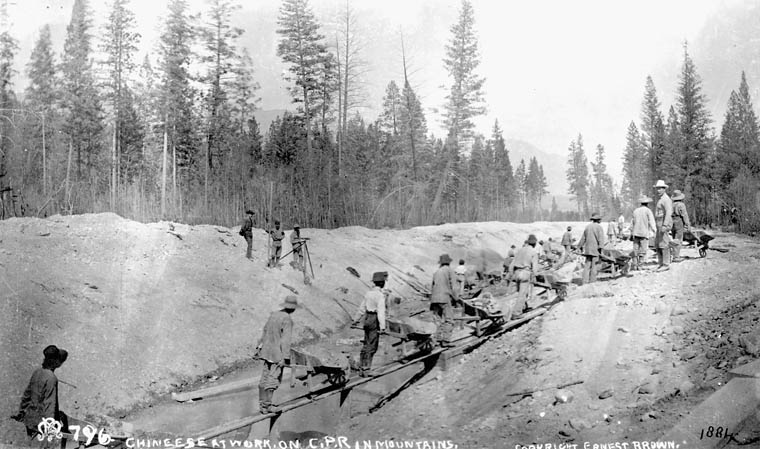
Chinese labourers working on the Canadian Pacific Railway

Before 1885 and the completion of the Canadian Pacific Railway (CPR), access to British Columbia from other parts of Canada was difficult. The creation of a better transportation system was essential to integration of British Columbia into the new Confederation.

Chinese railway workers made up the labour force for construction of two one-hundred mile sections of the Canadian Pacific Railway from the Pacific to Craigellachie in the Eagle Pass in British Columbia. When British Columbia agreed to join Confederation in 1871, one of the conditions was that the Dominion government build a railway linking B.C. with eastern Canada within 10 years. British Columbian politicians and their electorate agitated for an immigration program from the British Isles to provide this railway labour, but Prime Minister Sir John A. Macdonald, betrayed the wishes of his constituency (Victoria) by insisting the project cut costs by employing Chinese immigrants to build the railway, and summarized the situation this way to Parliament in 1882: "It is simply a question of alternatives: either you must have this labour or you can't have the railway." (British Columbian politicians had wanted a settlement-immigration plan for workers from the British Isles, but Canadian politicians and investors said it would be too expensive).

Chinese communities in Canada in the 19th and well into the 20th centuries were organized around the traditional kinship systems linking people belonging to the same clans together. As not everyone in the Chinese communities necessarily belonged to the same clans, "voluntary" associations that functioned in many ways like guilds that provided social welfare, community events and a forum for politics became very important in Chinese-Canadian communities. Linking together all of the voluntary associations were Benevolent Associations that in effect ran the various Chinatowns in Canada, mediating disputes within the communities and providing for leaders who negotiated with Canadian politicians.

Many workers from Guangdong Province (mainly Taishanese people and Pearl River Delta peoples) arrived to help build the Canadian Pacific Railway in the 19th century as did Chinese veterans of the gold rushes. These workers accepted the terms offered by the Chinese labour contractors who were engaged by the railway construction company to hire them—low pay, long hours, lower wages than non-Chinese workers and dangerous working conditions, in order to support their families that stayed in China. Their willingness to endure hardship for low wages enraged fellow non-Chinese workers who thought they were unnecessarily complicating the labour market situations. Most of the Chinese immigrants in the 19th century spoke Cantonese and their term for Canada was Gum San (Chinese: 金山; Jyutping: gam1 saan1; Cantonese Yale: gām sāan; lit. 'golden mountain'). The name Gum San, which concerned a supposed gigantic mountain made of pure gold located somewhere in the Rockies, was not taken literally, but instead was a metaphor for the hopes of Chinese immigrants for greater wealth in Canada. Almost all of the Chinese immigrants in the 19th century were young men, with women staying behind in China with the hope of marrying a "Gold mountain guest" as those who made money in Canada usually returned to China. Unable to marry white women, many Chinese men in Canada married First Nations women as the Indian peoples were more willing to accept them.

From the passage of the Chinese Immigration Act in 1885, under pressure "to stop the flow of immigrants" the Canadian government began to charge a $50 head tax ($800 CAD in 1999) for each Chinese person immigrating to Canada. The Chinese were the only ethnic group that had to pay such a tax.

=== Early 20th century ===
In 1902, the Liberal Prime Minister Sir Wilfrid Laurier appointed a Royal Commission on Chinese and Japanese Immigration, whose report stated that the Asians were "unfit for full citizenship ... obnoxious to a free community and dangerous to the state." Following the Royal Commission's report, Parliament voted to increase the Chinese head tax to $500, which temporarily caused Chinese immigration to Canada to stop. However, those Chinese wishing to go to Canada began to save up money to pay the head tax, which led to agitation, especially in British Columbia for the Dominion government to ban Asian immigration. Between September 7–9, 1907, an anti-Asian pogrom took place in Vancouver. The Asiatic Exclusion League organized attacks against homes and businesses owned by Chinese, Japanese, Korean and Indian immigrants under the slogan "White Canada Forever!"; though no one was killed, much property damage was done and numerous Asian-Canadians were beaten.

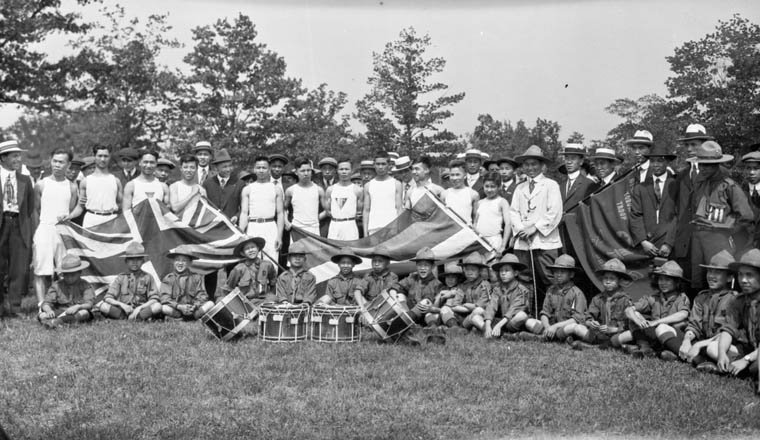
Chinese Canadians in Toronto's High Park, 1919

The 1907 pogrom was merely the most dramatic expression of the continuous agitation in Canada, especially in western Canada and among the working class, for the total exclusion of Asian immigration to Canada. In 1922, the feminist Emily Murphy published her best-selling book The Black Candle blaming Chinese and black immigrants for allegedly causing the problems of drug addiction among white Canadians. In 1923, the federal Liberal government of William Lyon Mackenzie King banned Chinese immigration with the passage of the Chinese Immigration Act of 1923, although numerous exemptions for businessmen, clergy, students and others did not end immigration entirely. With this act, the Chinese received similar legal treatment to blacks before them who Canada also had specifically excluded from immigration on the basis of race. (This was formalised in 1911 by Prime Minister Sir Wilfrid Laurier who in Sub-section (c) of Section 38 of the Immigration Act called blacks "unsuitable" for Canada.) During the next 25 years, more and more laws against the Chinese were passed. Most jobs were closed to Chinese men and women. Many Chinese opened their own restaurants and laundry businesses. In British Columbia, Saskatchewan and Ontario, Chinese employers were not allowed to hire white females. Ernest Chewant Mark, an immigrant who arrived in Canada in 1908, emerged as one of the leading critics of the 1923 Exclusion Act, and worked closely with Senator William Proudfoot, a Presbyterian minister, into seeking to pressure the government to repeal the act.

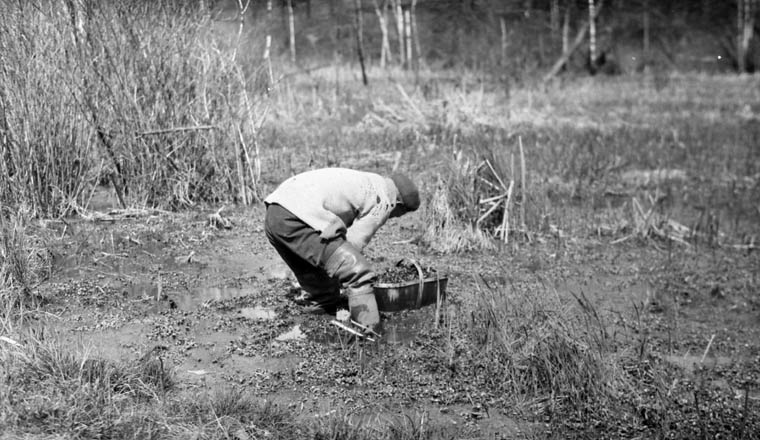
A Chinese man picking watercress in Toronto's High Park, 1920

Some of those Chinese-Canadian workers settled in Canada after the railway was constructed. Most could not bring the rest of their families, including immediate relatives, due to government restrictions and enormous processing fees. They established Chinatowns and societies in undesirable sections of the cities, such as Dupont Street (now East Pender) in Vancouver, which had been the focus of the early city's red-light district until Chinese merchants took over the area from the 1890s onwards. During the Great Depression, life was even tougher for the Chinese than it was for other Canadians. In Alberta, for example, Chinese Canadians received relief payments of less than half the amount paid to other Canadians. And because the Chinese Exclusion Act prohibited any additional immigration from China, the Chinese men who had arrived earlier had to face these hardships alone, without the companionship of their wives and children. Census data from 1931 shows that there were 1,240 men to every 100 women in Chinese Canadian communities. To protest the Chinese Exclusion Act, Chinese Canadians closed their businesses and boycotted Dominion Day celebrations every July 1, which became known as "Humiliation Day" by the Chinese Canadians. The film-maker Melinda Friedman stated about her interviews with Chinese Canadian veterans of World War II: "The thing that was the most shocking to me was hearing from the veterans ... describe what life was like in Vancouver as late as 1940, with the Ku Klux Klan living in Vancouver who were targeting, quite often, the Chinese community."

In 1937, when Japan attacked China, the government of Chiang Kai-shek asked for the overseas Chinese communities to support the homeland. From 1937 onward, the Chinese Canadian community regularly organized fund-raising events to raise money for China. By 1945, the Chinese Canadians had contributed $5 million Canadian dollars to China. Following the Xi'an Incident of December 1936, a "United Front" bringing together the Chinese Communist Party and the Kuomintang had been formed to resist Japanese aggression, which was soon put to the test when Japan invaded China in July 1937. Within the Chinese Canadian communities, a "United Front" atmosphere prevailed from the summer of 1937 on as various community leaders put aside their differences to focus on supporting China. Starting in 1937, a boycott was organized of Japanese goods, and Canadian businesses that sold war materials to Japan were subject of demonstrations. One of the main slogans used at the demonstrations was "Don't Kill Babies", a reference to the Imperial Japanese Army's habit of using Chinese infants for "bayonet practice".

=== Second World War ===
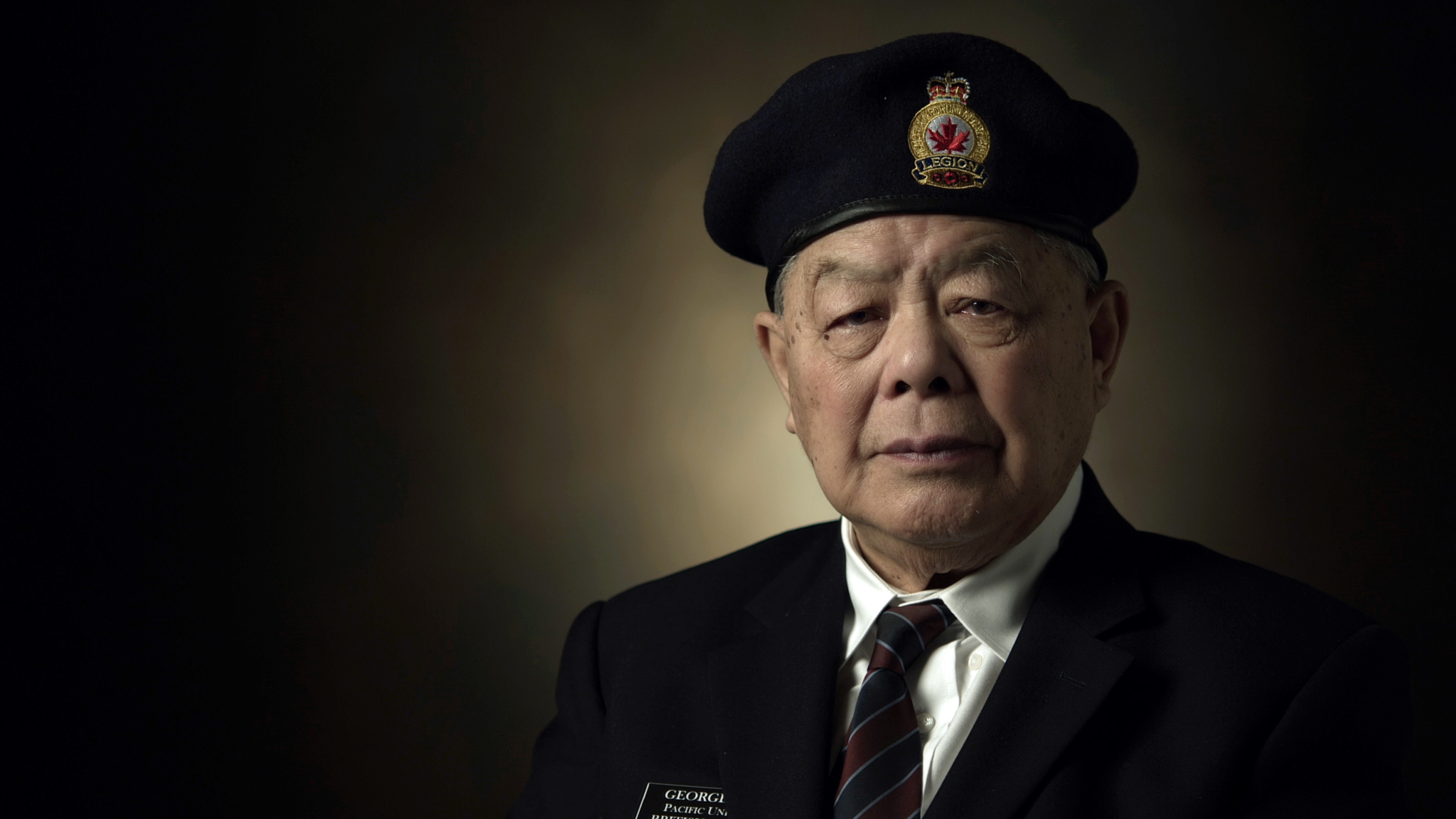
World War II veteran George Chow

The Second World War became the turning point in history of Chinese Canadians. To show support for the war, fund-raising events were held from September 1939 to raise money for the Canadian war effort, and by 1945, Chinese Canadians had purchased some $10 million worth of Victory Bonds. The Chinese community of Victoria was praised in a parliamentary resolution for being especially active in holding events to encourage people to buy Victory Bonds. In December 1941, Canada declared war on Japan, and from time onward, China was an ally, which helped to change white Canadian views.

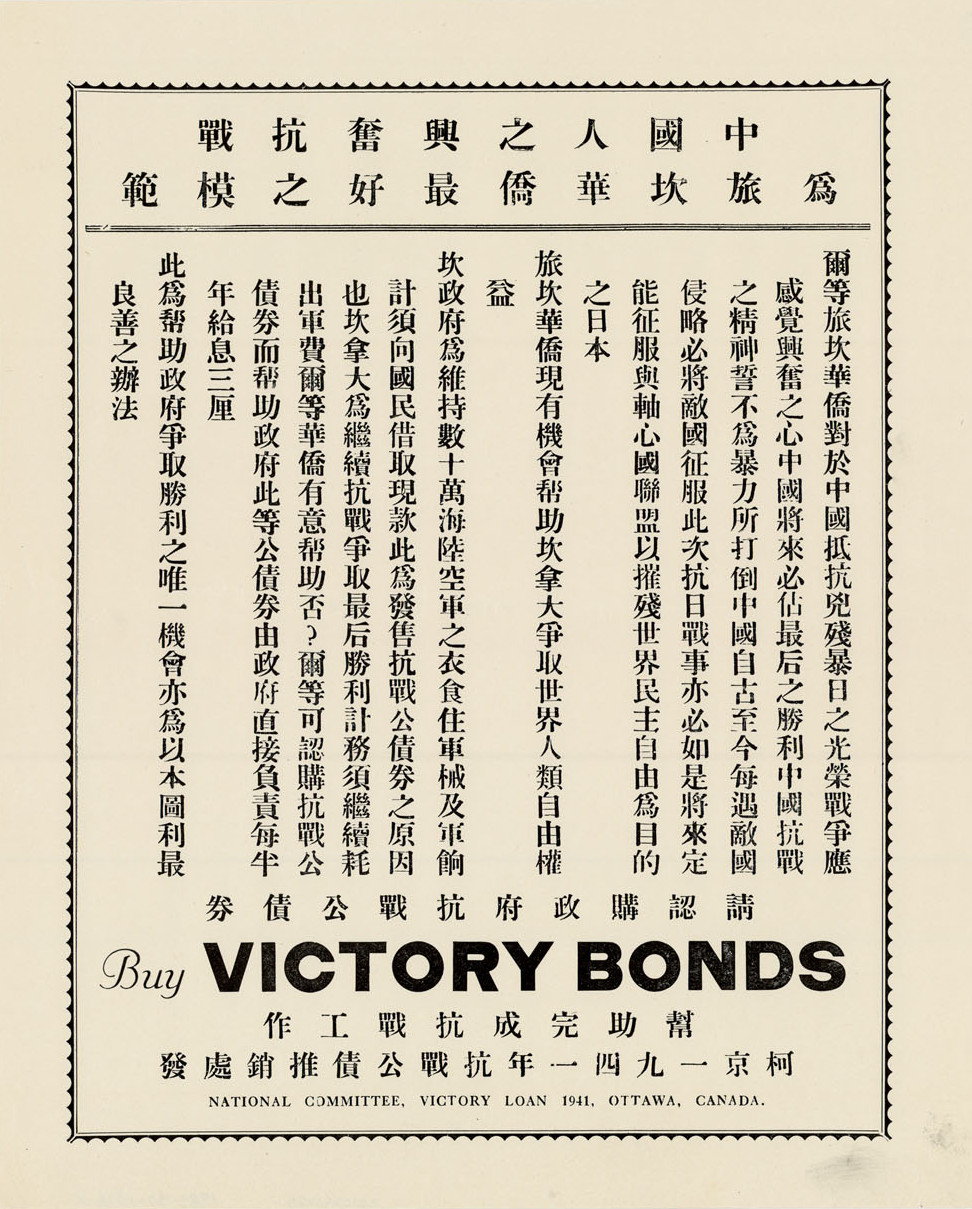
Chinese-language poster encouraging the purchase of Canada Victory Bonds

The African American newspaper The Pittsburgh Courier called for the "double victory" or "Double V campaign" in a 1942 editorial, urging black Americans to work for victory over fascism abroad and racism at home. Though originally intended for black Americans, the slogan of "double victory" was taken up by Asian-American groups as well. The same slogan of "double victory" came to be embraced by Chinese Canadians. Despite not being allowed to vote or hold office, about 600 Chinese Canadians enlisted as "active" members to fight overseas (until late 1944 all Canadians serving abroad were volunteers). The prime minister, William Lyon Mackenzie King, did not want Chinese Canadians to serve in the military as he knew that veterans would demand the right to vote just as Chinese Canadian veterans had done after World War I, but strong pressure from the British Special Operations Executive, which needed Asian Canadians to work as agents who could go undercover in Japanese-occupied Asia, forced his hand. Unlike in the First World War, where about 300 Chinese Canadians had served in the Canadian Expeditionary Force, this time Chinese Canadians serving in the Canadian military were given officers' commissions. All three services were reluctant to have Chinese Canadians given officers' commissions as having Asian men serving as officers giving orders to white men challenged the racial hierarchy. However, all those serving as airmen in the Royal Canadian Air Force (RCAF) were officers, and once Chinese Canadian airmen received officers' commissions, both the Army and the Navy were forced to follow suit. The RCAF was the service most open to Chinese Canadians because of the heavy losses taken in the bombing offensive against Germany. For RCAF, a 5% loss ratio was considered crippling and between March 5 – June 24, 1943, the 6th Group of the RCAF lost 100 bombers in air raids over Germany, suffering a 7% loss ratio; altogether, 9,980 Canadians were killed in bombing raids against German cities between 1940 and 1945, making the strategic bombing offensive one of the most costly operations for Canada in World War II.

In 1943, William Lore was commissioned as a lieutenant commander in the Royal Canadian Navy, becoming the first person of Chinese descent to be given an officer's commission in any of the Commonwealth navies. Lore was the first Allied officer to land in Hong Kong on August 30, 1945, and it he who announced to the surviving Canadian POWs, who had been held in barbaric conditions by the Japanese since surrendering on Christmas Day in 1941, being reduced down to "human skeletons", that they were now free men. Kam Hem Douglas Sam of the Royal Canadian Air Force, who had been serving on a Halifax bomber was shot down over France on June 28, 1944, and joined the French resistance, being awarded the Croix de Guerre from France after the war for his work with the resistance. Sam, who came from Victoria and could remember some French from high school, was able to pass himself off as a Vietnamese student in Reims. Sam first served with as a liaison with the Special Operations Executive (SOE) to organize landings of arms to the resistance from Britain. Sam later fought with the resistance, ambushing German troops on their way to Normandy. Flying Officer Quan Jil Louie of the RCAF was killed in early 1945 when his bomber was shot down over Germany. As Louie came from one of the more wealthier families of Vancouver's Chinatown, his death in action attracted much attention in Vancouver, and with it commentary he was not allowed to vote or hold office.

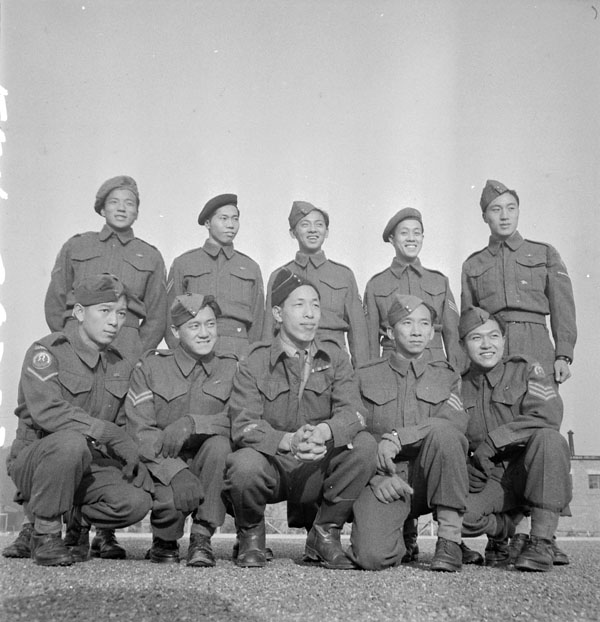
Chinese-Canadian soldiers from Vancouver serving in the Second World War

A number of Chinese Canadians were recruited by the SOE to serve in Japanese-occupied regions of China and Southeast Asia. About 150 Chinese Canadians served with the SOE Force 136 behind Japanese lines in Burma. Douglas Jung, who later become the first Chinese-Canadian MP, served as a SOE agent in Japanese-occupied Malaya in 1944–45, which was highly dangerous work as the Kenpeitai, the much feared Japanese military police, would give no mercy to any Allied agent whom they captured. Those serving with the Force 136 were given cyanide pills to take if faced with capture by the Japanese as it was known that any SOE agent captured by the Japanese would be tortured and killed. Another Chinese Canadian, Bill Chong, served with the British Army Aid Group in Hong Kong and southern China, smuggling out POWs to Free China (i.e. not occupied by the Japanese) and delivering aid to resistance groups. The willingness of Chinese Canadians to fight and if necessary die for Canada in the war changed public perceptions, and for the first time newspapers began to call for the repeal of the 1895 law which forbade all Asian Canadians to vote or hold offices. The Canadian historian Brereton Greenhous wrote of the efforts of the men of Force 136: "Several of them were decorated for their actions, and their service was a major factor in influencing the Canadian government to grant Chinese and Japanese Canadians full rights as Canadian citizens several years later".

Frank Wong of Vancouver who served with the Royal Canadian Electrical and Mechanical Engineers in Northwestern Europe in 1944–1945 recalled that his service with the Army was the first time he had been treated as an equal, stating: "They treated me just like an equal. You have your uniform, you're in it together; you eat together and you sleep together.". Like other Chinese Canadian veterans, Wong argued for equality of treatment, asking why he should be treated as a second-class citizen despite his war services. Wong stated his reasons for enlisting were: "I decided maybe if I joined the armed forces, after the war they would give me the right to vote". Peggy Lee of Toronto by contrast stated her reasons for enlisting in 1942 with the Women's Ambulance Corps was "do my bit" for Canada. Roy Mah who served with the SOE behind Japanese lines in Burma stated: "We thought that serving in the armed forces would be an opportunity for us to prove to the general public that we are loyal Canadians, that in time of need, they would see that we have no hesitation to don the King's uniform and go overseas to fight for our country, fight to preserve democracy." The Canadian historian Henry Yu stated about the efforts of Chinese-Canadian veterans: "They had to accept that they had fought this war—a good war in everyone's estimation—and they were still coming back to places built around white supremacy. So for some of them, they began vocally to argue: Why can't we vote still?"

Many Chinese Canadians argued that if Canada was fighting against not only Nazi Germany but her racist ideologies such as the Völkisch movement, then it was hypocritical for so many white Canadians to support attitudes of white supremacy back home. Chinese-Canadian veteran Frank Wong described the situation as being unable to "live outside Chinatown, and professional jobs were not available to [Chinese Canadians]. I wasn't even allowed to go swimming in a public pool." The contributions of Chinese Canadians toward the eventual allied victory did not spell an end to discrimination for them in Canada, although these attitudes did eventually start to dissipate. According to Chinese-Canadian veteran George Chow, after being treated "like a second-class citizen" in youth, during his service he was treated "just like an equal", elaborating on his service as such: "you have your uniform, you're in it together; you eat together and you sleep together." Catherine Clement, the curator of Chinese Canadian Military Museum in Vancouver stated: "It's called a double victory because they not only helped Canada win the war, but they also helped propel the civil rights movement for the Chinese-Canadians."

Canada was slow to lift the restrictions against the Chinese Canadians and grant them full rights as Canadian citizens. Because Canada signed the United Nations Charter of Human Rights at the conclusion of the Second World War, the Canadian government had to repeal the Chinese Exclusion Act, which contravened the UN Charter. The same year, 1947, Chinese Canadians were finally granted the right to vote in federal elections. Prime Minister William Lyon Mackenzie King was opposed to granting the franchise to Chinese Canadians, but Chinese-Canadian veterans led a coalition of churches, unions, civic groups and veterans' associations into pressuring the King government to end the exclusion of Chinese Canadians from the franchise. Friedman stated about Chinese-Canadian enfranchisement: "Canada has this great spot on the world stage—as just, fair and level-headed country—but the reason it is that way is because Chinese residents forced that issue and made it more just." One Second World War veteran, Ronald Lee, remembered when he learned that Chinese Canadians could now vote together with repeal of the Exclusion Act: "Down in Chinatown, we celebrated because we were Canadians! We were able to bring our families from China. It was quite the jubilation." Arguing that it was unjust to discriminate against veterans, professions such as the law, medicine and engineering were opened for Chinese Canadians for the first time after 1945.

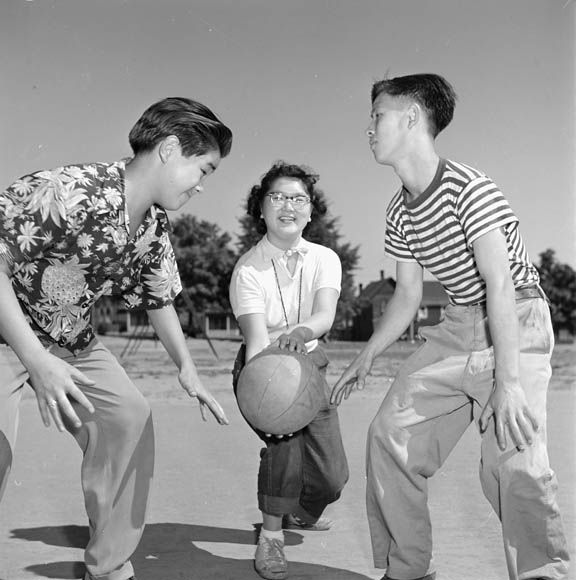
Lila Gee, playground monitor, with Chinese children playing basketball at McLean Park in Vancouver, 1951

However, it took another 20 years, until the points system was adopted for selecting immigrants, for the Chinese to begin to be admitted under the same criteria as any other applicants. In the 1957 election, the Second World War veteran Douglas Jung was elected as a Progressive Conservative for the riding of Vancouver Centre, becoming the first Chinese Canadian elected to the House of Commons. Jung's election, which proved that white voters would vote for a Chinese Canadian, marked the beginning of a trend where Chinese Canadians cease to depend upon the Benevolent Associations to negotiate with the politicians and instead Chinese Canadians became politically active themselves. After many years of organized calls for an official Canadian government public apology and redress to the historic Head tax, the minority Conservative government of Stephen Harper announced, as part of their pre-election campaign, an official apology. On June 22, 2006, Prime Minister Stephen Harper delivered a message of redress in the House of Commons, calling it a "grave injustice".

Some educated Chinese arrived in Canada during the war as refugees. Since the mid-20th century, most new Chinese Canadians come from university-educated families, who of still consider quality education an essential value. These newcomers are a major part of the "brain gain", the inverse of the infamous "brain drain", i.e., the occurrence of many Canadians leaving to the United States, of which Chinese have also been a part.

=== Late 20th century ===
From 1947 to the early 1970s, Chinese immigrants to Canada came mostly from Hong Kong, Taiwan, or Southeast Asia. Chinese from the mainland who were eligible in the family reunification program had to visit the Canadian High Commission in Hong Kong, since Canada and the PRC did not have diplomatic relations until 1970. From the late 1980s, an influx of Taiwanese people immigrated to Canada forming a group of Taiwanese Canadians. They settled in areas such as Vancouver, British Columbia and to the adjacent cities of Burnaby, Richmond and Coquitlam. There was a significant influx of wealthy Chinese entrepreneurs from Hong Kong in the early and mid-1990s before the handover of Hong Kong to the People's Republic of China (PRC). Canada was a preferred location, in part because investment visas were significantly easier to obtain than visas to the United States. Vancouver, Richmond and Toronto were the major destinations of these Chinese. During those years, immigrants from Hong Kong alone made up to 46% of all Chinese immigrants to Canada. After 1997, a significant portion of Chinese immigrants chose to move back to Hong Kong, some of a more permanent nature, after the dust of the handover was settled and fears of a "Communist takeover" turned out to be unnecessary.

Starting in the late 20th century, Chinese Canadians have become active in the cultural scene in Canada, with the writers such Larissa Lai, Evelyn Lau, Denise Chong, Wayson Choy, Paul Yee, Jim Wong-Chu, and Vincent Lam all winning acclaim. In the world of film-making, Christina Wong, William Dere, Colleen Leung, Richard Fung, Dora Nipp, Tony Chan, Yung Chang Julia Kwan, Karin Lee, Mina Shum, Michelle Wong, Paul Wong, and Keith Lock have worked as directors and/or as script writers. The Confucian tradition emphasizing hard work, scholarship, self-discipline and learning has meant the Chinese Canadians families have strongly aspired for higher education and the 2001 census reported that over a quarter of Chinese Canadians had a university degree. As it was the Liberal government of Lester Pearson that liberalized the immigration system in 1967, Chinese Canadians tended to vote for the Liberals in the late 20th and early 21st centuries. In 1993, Raymond Chan became the first Chinese Canadian cabinet minister, and in 1999, Adrienne Clarkson became the first Chinese Canadian governor general.

=== 21st century ===
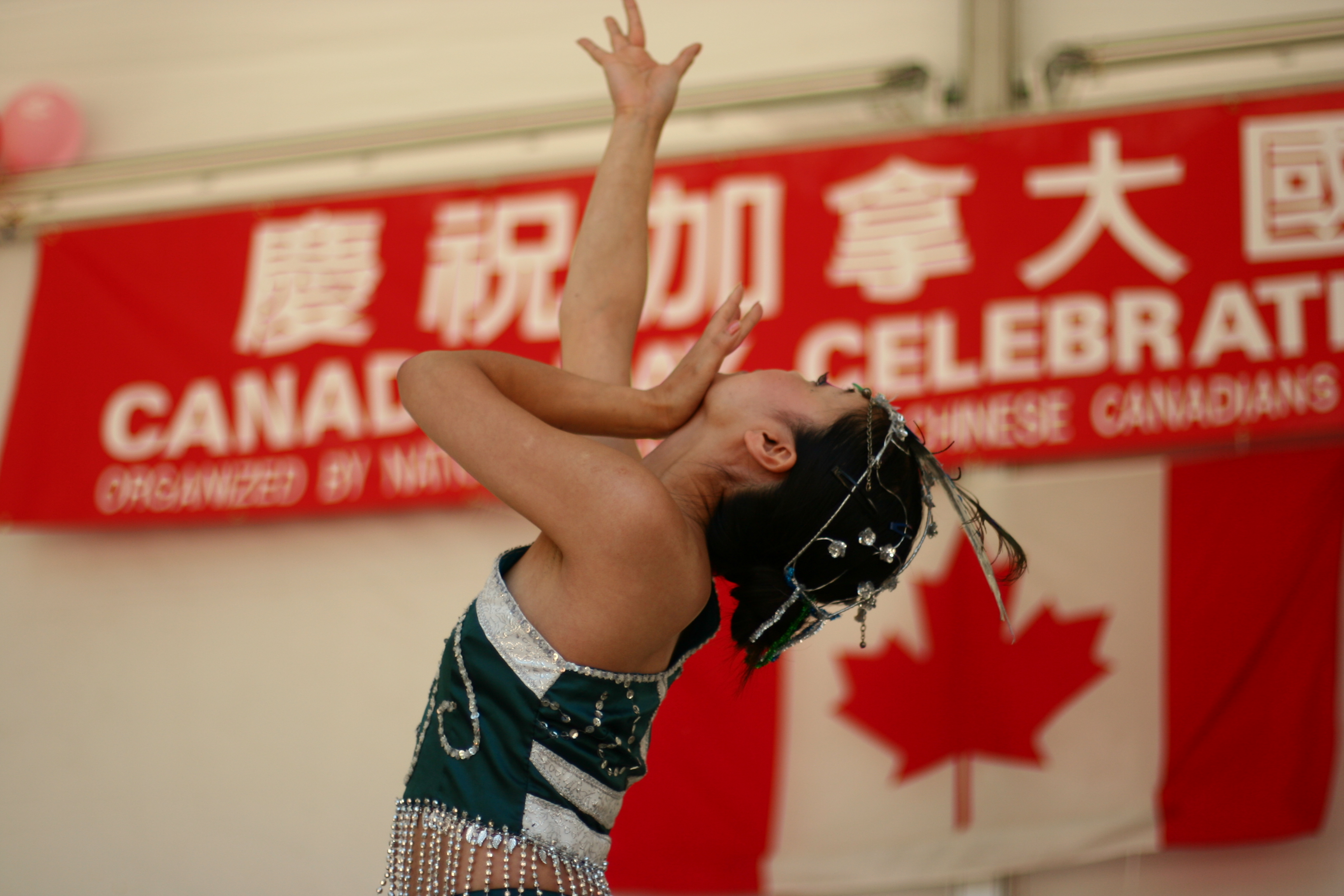
Canada Day celebrations in Toronto, organized by the National Congress of Chinese Canadians

In the 21st century, Chinese immigration from Hong Kong has dropped sharply and the largest source of Chinese immigration is now from Mainland China. A smaller number of Chinese have arrived from Taiwan and very small numbers from Fiji, French Polynesia, and New Zealand. Today, mainland China has taken over from Hong Kong and Taiwan as the largest source of Chinese immigration. The PRC has also taken over from all countries and regions as the country sending the most immigrants to Canada. The 2002 report from Citizenship and Immigration Canada indicates that since 2000, the People's Republic of China (PRC) has been the largest source of Canadian immigrants. On average, over 30,000 immigrants from China have arrived annually, accounting for about 15% of all immigrants to Canada. This pattern continued to rise, reaching a peak of over 40,000 in 2005. Data from the 2006 census reveals that approximately 70% of Chinese Canadians reside in the Greater Vancouver or Greater Toronto areas. The City of Richmond, in particular, has substantial and diverse Chinese Canadian communities, which play a significant role in shaping the city’s cultural and media landscapes, influenced by both local developments and transnational connections.

On June 22, 2006, Prime Minister Stephen Harper delivered a message of redress in the House of Commons, offering an apology in Cantonese and compensation for the head tax once paid by Chinese immigrants. Survivors or their spouses will be paid approximately $20,000 CAD in compensation.

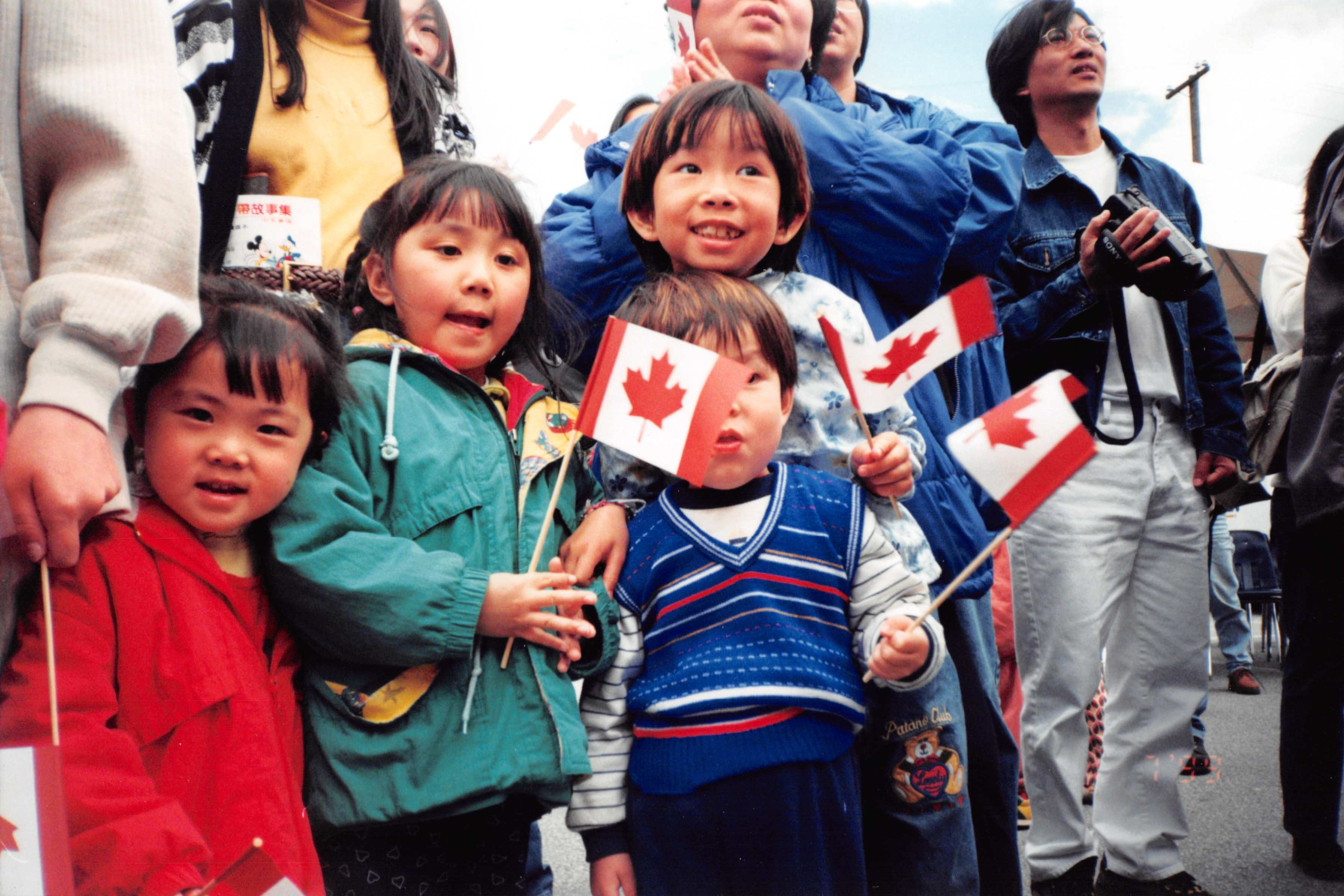
Canadian Children Immigration

In December 2008, the Philippines passed China as Canada's leading source of immigrants. In 2010, when Mainland China became the second largest economy in the world after the United States, its economic growth sparked even greater immigration opportunities to mainland Chinese. A 2011 survey shown that 60% of Chinese millionaires plan to immigrate, where 37% of the respondents wanted to immigrate to Canada. Many foreign countries such as Canada hold very large attraction for rich Chinese, because of their better social welfare system, higher quality of education and a greater opportunity for investment. The main reasons Chinese businesspeople want to move abroad was for some educational opportunities for their children, advanced medical treatment, worsening pollution back home (especially urban air quality) and food safety concerns. The Canadian Federal Investor Immigrant Program (FIIP) as a cash-for-visa scheme allows many powerful Chinese to seek for a Canadian citizenship, and recent reports show that 697 of the 700 (99.6%) of the applicants to this visa in 2011 were mainland Chinese. However, Canada—along with other English-speaking countries such as the United States and Australia—has increased its immigration requirements, forcing Chinese millionaires to seek permanent residency elsewhere.

The COVID-19 pandemic beginning in March 2020 led to a sharp increase in anti-Chinese sentiment worldwide, with Chinese people wrongly blamed for the virus. This resulted in widespread prejudice, evidenced by derogatory terms and hashtags in various countries. In Canada, a significant number of Chinese Canadians faced disrespect and harassment, with over 60% reporting disrespectful treatment and more than 30% experiencing threats or harassment. This rise in racism has also increased mental health concerns in the community. In response, Chinese Canadian groups have been actively working to track and combat this discrimination, providing ongoing support as the community navigates these challenges. As of September 2021, statistics from Project 1907 revealed a concerning 2,265 incidents of anti-Asian racism within Canada, surpassing the United States on a per capita basis by over 100%. This alarming trend, largely fueled by misplaced blame on the Asian community for the COVID-19 pandemic, has highlighted the urgent need for systemic change. In response to this challenging environment, the federal public service saw the formation of the Network of Asian Federal Employees (NAFE), an initiative aimed at addressing these issues and promote inclusivity.

== Demography ==
=== Population ===
Chinese population by year
Year	% of Canadian Population
1871	0.0
1881	0.0
1891	0.2
1901	0.3
1911	0.4
1921	0.4
1931	0.4
1941	0.3
1951	0.2
1961	0.3
1971	0.6
1981	1.2
1991	2.3
2001	3.5
2006	4.3
2011	4.5
2016	5.1
2021	4.6

At the turn of the 20th century, the Chinese population in Canada was 17,312. From the years 1988 to 1993, 166,487 Hong Kong immigrants had settled in Canada.

In 2001, 25% of Chinese in Canada were Canadian-born. During the same year, the Chinese population stood at 1,094,700 accounted for 3.5% of Canada's total population. By 2006 the population stood at 1,346,510 comprising 4.3% of the Canadian population. StatsCan projects by 2031, the Chinese Canadian population is projected to reach between 2.4 and 3.0 million, constituting approximately 6 percent of the Canadian population. Much of the growth will be bolstered by sustained immigration as well as creating a younger age structure.

During the 2011 census in Canada, it was estimated that 1,324,700 individuals of pure Chinese origin resided in Canada. This number increased to 1,487,000 individuals, when including those of both pure Chinese origin and people of partial Chinese ancestry (meaning, individuals with both Chinese and some other racial and ethnic origin) during the 2011 census in Canada.

Most of the Chinese Canadian community is concentrated within the provinces of British Columbia and Ontario. The five metropolitan areas with the largest Chinese-Canadian populations are the Greater Toronto Area (631,050), Metro Vancouver (474,655), Greater Montreal (89,400), Calgary Region (89,675) and the Edmonton Metropolitan Region (60,200). The Chinese are the largest visible minority group in Alberta and British Columbia, and are the second largest in Ontario. The highest concentration of Chinese Canadians is in Vancouver and Richmond (British Columbia), where they constitute the largest ethnic group by country, and one in five residents are Chinese.

The province of Saskatchewan has a growing Chinese community, at over one percent as of 2006, mainly in the city of Saskatoon (2.1%), the province's largest city, and to a lesser extent, Regina (1.9%), the capital of the province. The Riversdale neighbourhood of Saskatoon has a historical Chinese settlement dating back to the early 1900s, where Chinese immigrants were employed by the Grand Trunk Pacific Railway, and established businesses within this district. Riversdale is currently home to many Chinese restaurants and stores. Chinese are the largest visible minority group in Saskatchewan.

According to the 2011 census by Statistics Canada, the Chinese Canadian population was approximately 1.4 million. In the 2016 census, individuals identifying as of Chinese ethnic origin comprised approximately 4.6% of the Canadian population, totaling to around 1.57 million people. By the 2021 Canadian census, the Chinese Canadian community increased to 1.71 million.

=== Religion ===
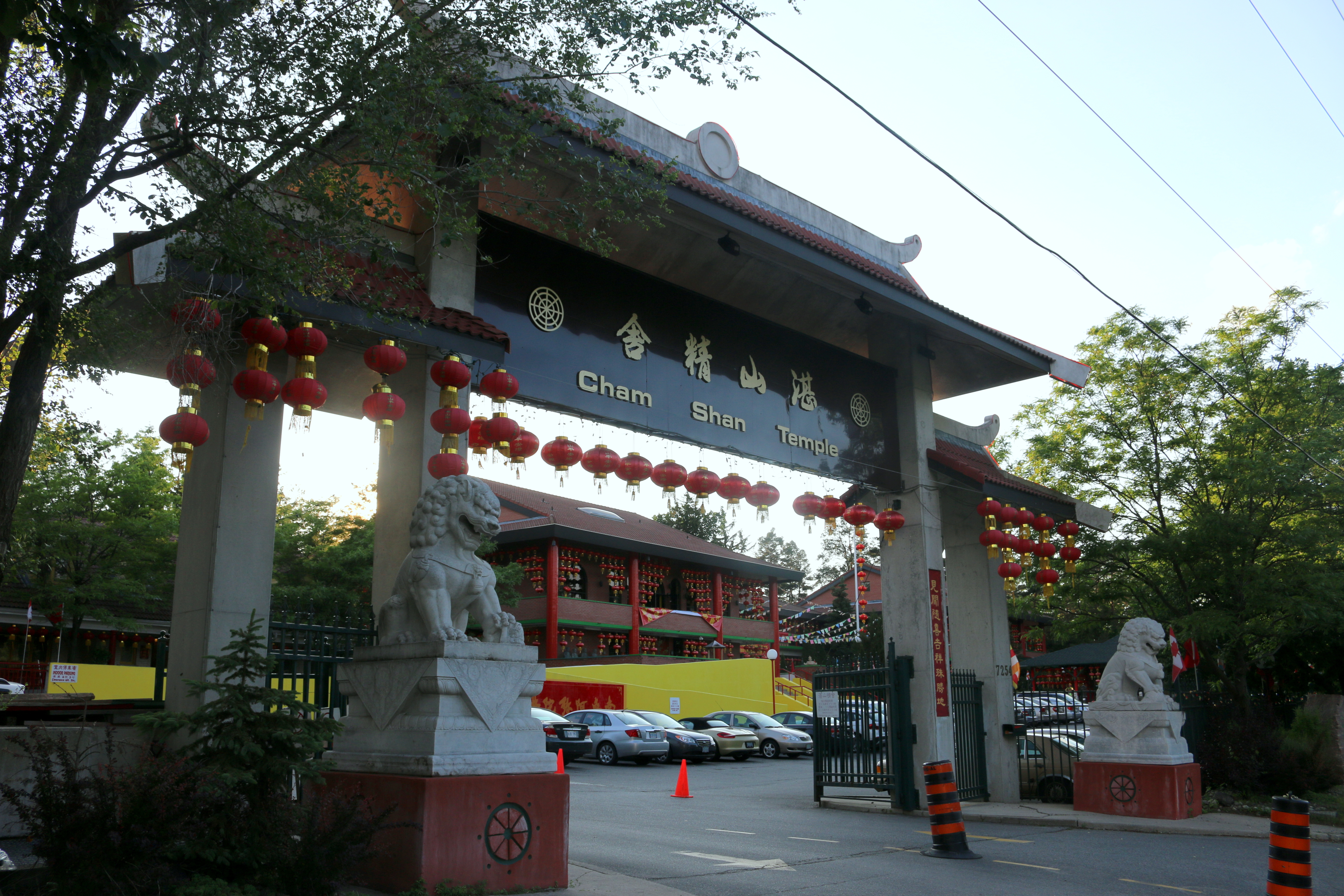
Cham Shan Temple is a Chinese temple located in Markham, north of Toronto.

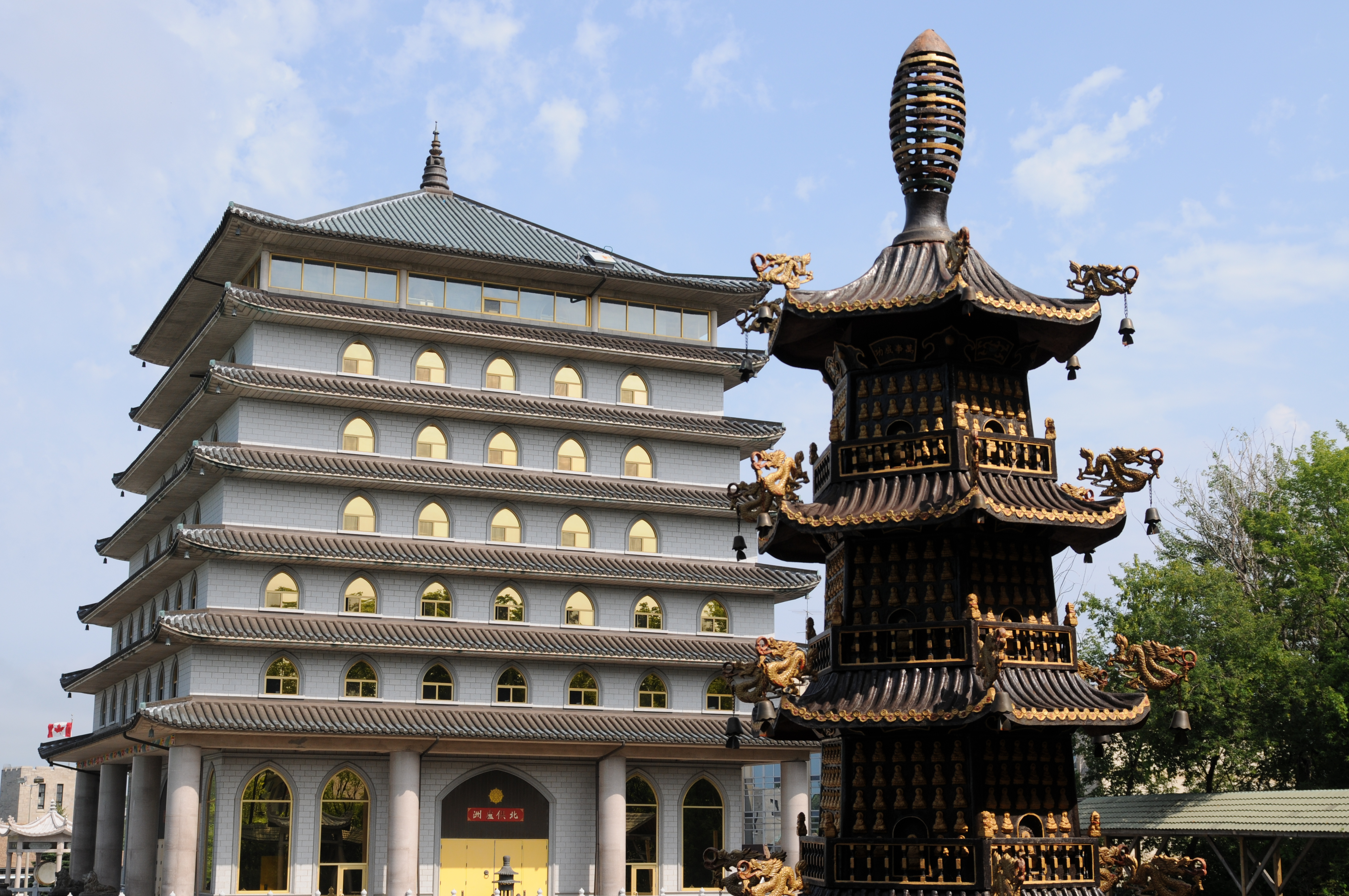
Ten Thousand Buddhas Sarira Stupa in Niagara Falls, Ontario.

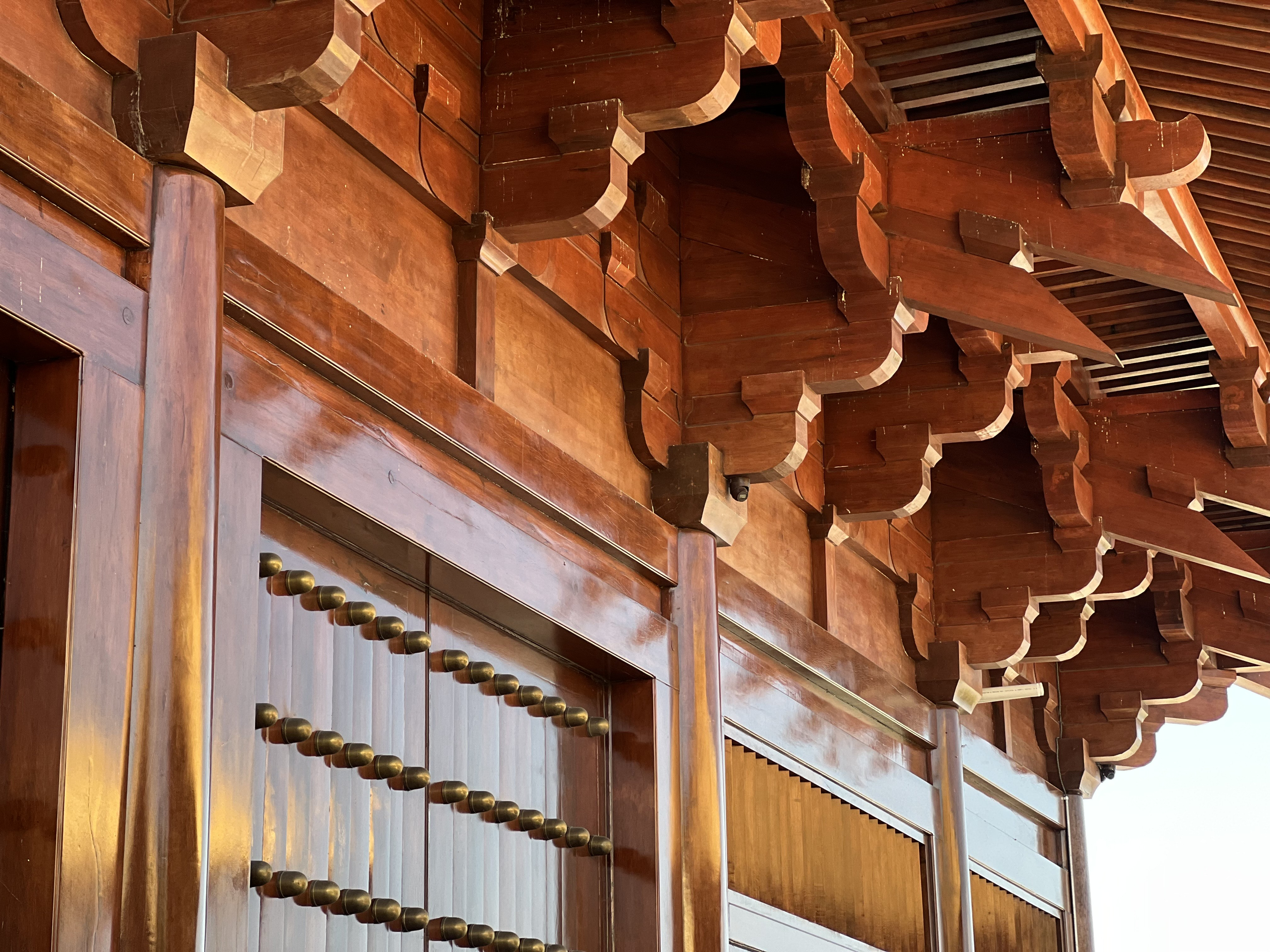
Dougong joinery at Wutai Shan Buddhist Garden, Cavan Monaghan, Ontario.

Generational differences are also evident regarding religious practice and affiliation within this population group.

Among Toronto's early Chinese immigrants especially, the church body was an important structure serving as a meeting place, hall and leisure club. Even today, over 30 churches in Toronto continue to hold Chinese congregations.

Christianity reached its peak of popularity in the early 1960s, with the 1961 census still reporting that 60% of the Chinese declared themselves Christians. Over the following 40 years Christianity has been steadily declining both among Canadian-born Chinese and new immigrants. About half of Chinese Canadians practise Chinese folk religion.

In 2001, 56% of Chinese Canadians aged 15 and over said that they did not have any religious affiliation, compared with the national average of 17%. As a result, Chinese Canadians make up 13% of all Canadians who did not report a religious affiliation despite making up 4% of the population. Among Chinese Canadians, 14% were Buddhist, 14% were Catholic and 9% belonged to a Protestant denomination.

Chinese Canadian demography by religion
Religious group	2021 (Note: Religious breakdown proportions based on "Chinese", “Taiwanese” and “Hong Konger” ethnic or cultural origin response on the 2021 census.)		2001 (Note: Religious breakdown proportions based on "Chinese" and “Taiwanese" ethnic or cultural origin response on the 2001 census.)	
Religious group	Pop.	%	Pop.	%
Irreligion	1,249,350	67.19%	611,320	55.65%
Christianity	443,255	23.84%	322,395	29.35%
Buddhism	147,420	7.93%	157,390	14.33%
Islam	3,945	0.21%	2,105	0.19%
Judaism	1,450	0.08%	810	0.07%
Hinduism	605	0.03%	465	0.04%
Indigenous spirituality	170	0.01%	—N/a	0%
Sikhism	275	0.01%	255	0.02%
Other	13,085	0.7%	3,720	0.34%
Total Chinese Canadian population	1,859,555	100%	1,098,460	100%

Chinese Canadian demography by Christian sects
Religious group	2021		2001	
Religious group	Pop.	%	Pop.	%
Catholic	180,345	40.78%	150,550	46.7%
Orthodox	1,425	0.32%	1,130	0.35%
Protestant	61,250	13.85%	104,740	32.49%
Other Christian	200,265	45.28%	65,975	20.46%
Total Chinese Canadian Christian population	442,255	100%	322,395	100%

Religious group	Population % 1921	Population % 1961	Population % 1971	Population % 1981	Population % 1991	Population % 2001	Population % 2018
Not religious / other	–	–	43.7%	57.4%	55.3%	55.6%	49.3%
Christianity	10%	60%	46.4%	36.3%	32.4%	29.2%	20.9%
Catholicism	–	–	12.9%	14.2%	16.0%	13.8%	–
Protestantism	–	–	33.5%	22.1%	16.4%	15.4%	–
Buddhism	–	–	–	–	11.4%	14.6%	24.8%
Other religion	–	–	9.9%	6.4%	–	–	–
Chinese folk religion	–	–	–	–	–	–	47.4%
Population	–	–	124,600	285,800	633,931	1,094,638	1,376,137

=== Language ===
In 2001, 87% of Chinese reported having a conversational knowledge of at least one official language, while 15% reported that they could speak neither English nor French. Of those who could not speak an official language, 50% immigrated to Canada in the 1990s, while 22% immigrated in the 1980s. These immigrants tended to be in the older age groups. Of prime working-age Chinese immigrants, 89% reported knowing at least one official language.

In 2001, collectively, the varieties of Chinese are the third-most common reported mother tongue, after English and French. 3% of the Canadian population, or 872,000 people, reported the Chinese language as their mother tongue—the language that they learned as a child and still understand. The most common Chinese mother tongue is Cantonese. Of these people, 44% were born in Hong Kong, 27% were born in Guangdong Province in China, and 18% were Canadian-born. The power dynamics of these Cantonese-speaking communities stretch across generational, geographical, cultural, and social class spectrums. The second-most common reported Chinese mother tongue was Mandarin. Of these people, 85% were born in either Mainland China or Taiwan, 7% were Canadian-born, and 2% were born in Malaysia. However, only about 790,500 people reported speaking Chinese at home on a regular basis, 81,900 fewer than those who reported having a Chinese mother tongue. This suggests some language loss has occurred, mainly among the Canadian-born who learned Chinese as a child, but who may not speak it regularly or do not use it as their main language at home.

==== Census data ====
Some varieties may be underreported due to respondents simply responding "Chinese" rather than specifying:

First language	Population (2011)	% of total population (2011)	Population (2006)	% of total population (2006)	Notes
Chinese (not otherwise specified)	425,210	1.3%	456,705	1.5%	
Cantonese	372,460	1.1%	361,450	1.2%	
Mandarin	248,705	0.8%	170,950	0.5%	
Hokkien	9,635	0.03%	9,620	0.03%	
"Foochow" (Fuzhou dialect)	5,925	0.02%	N/A	N/A	
Hakka	5,115	0.02%	N/A	N/A	
Shanghainese	2,920	0.009%	N/A	N/A	

=== Immigration ===
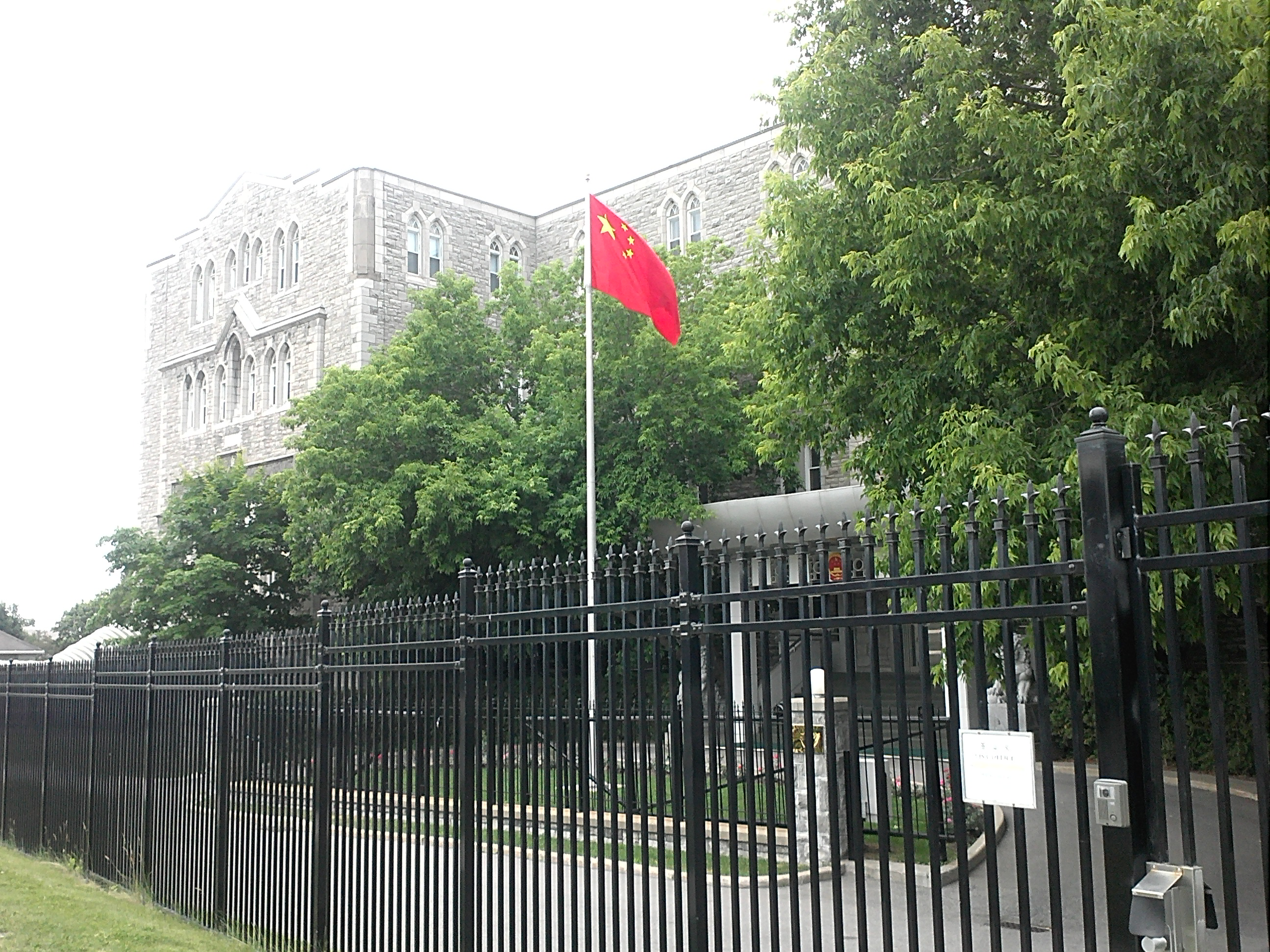
Embassy of the People's Republic of China in Ottawa

As of 2001, almost 75% of the Chinese population in Canada lived in either Vancouver or Toronto. The Chinese population was 17% in Vancouver and 9% in Toronto. More than 50% of the Chinese immigrants who just arrived in 2000/2001 reported that their reason for settling in a given region was because their family and friends already lived there.

The economic growth of mainland China since the turn of the 21st century has sparked even greater emigration opportunities for mainland Chinese. A 2011 survey showed that 60% of Chinese millionaires planned to emigrate, where 37% of the respondents wanted to emigrate to Canada. The main reasons Chinese businesspeople wanted to move abroad was for greater educational opportunities for their children, advanced medical treatment, worsening pollution back home (especially urban air quality), concerns of political instability and food safety concerns. The Canadian Immigrant Investor Program (CANIIP) allows many wealthy Chinese to qualify for Canadian citizenship: among the 700 applicants to this program in 2011, 697 (99.6%) were mainland Chinese. In addition, many Chinese immigrants to Canada apply through the provincial nominee program, which requires immigrants to invest in a business in the province in which they settle.

== Geographical distribution ==
Data from this section from Statistics Canada, 2021.

=== Provinces & territories ===
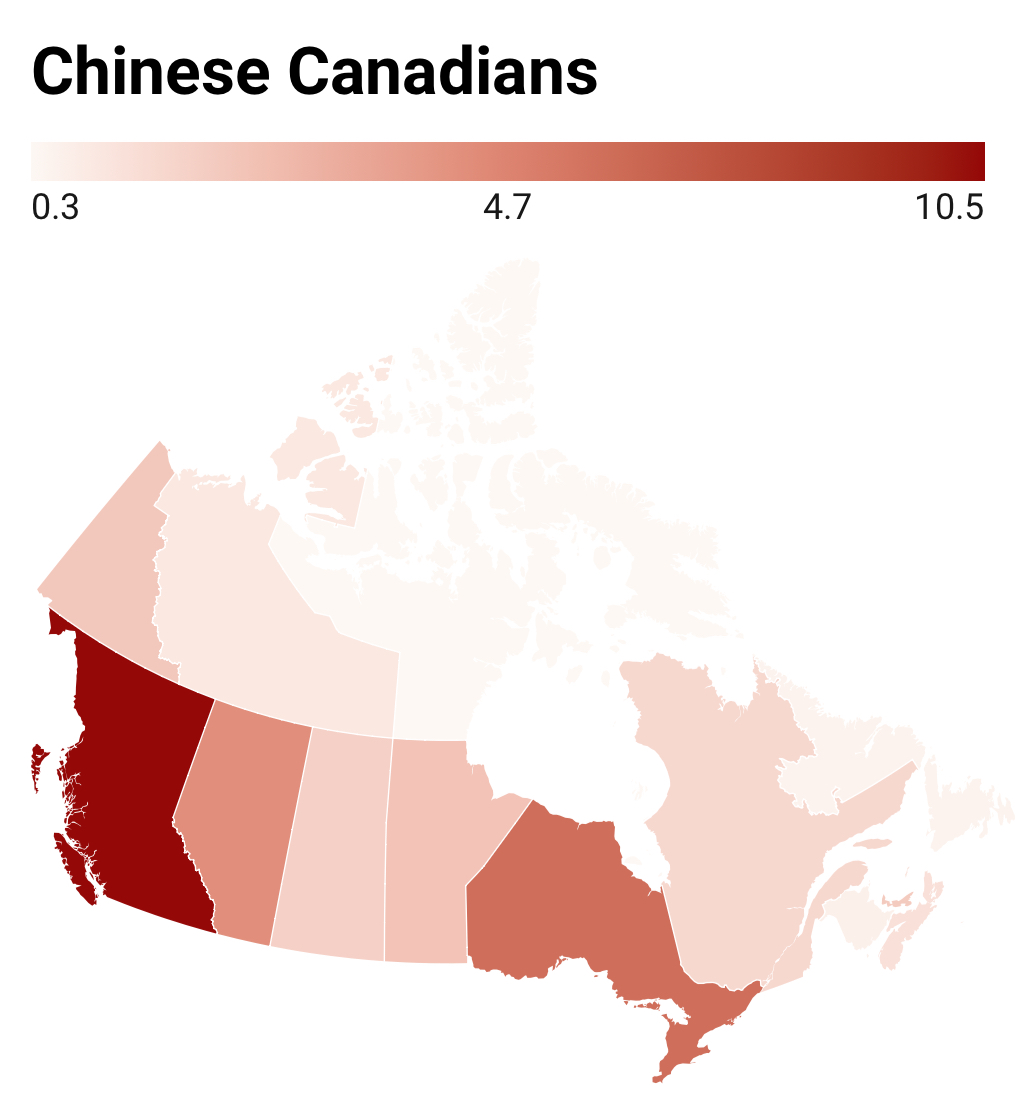
Chinese percent in Canadian province/territory, 2021 census

Province / Territory	Percent Chinese	Total Chinese
Alberta	4.3%	177,990
British Columbia	10.5%	517,805
Manitoba	2.3%	29,550
New Brunswick	0.6%	4,600
Newfoundland and Labrador	0.5%	2,265
Northwest Territories	0.9%	365
Nova Scotia	1.2%	11,515
Nunavut	0.3%	100
Ontario	5.9%	821,835
Prince Edward Island	2.0%	3,050
Quebec	1.5%	123,985
Saskatchewan	1.8%	19,965
Yukon	2.1%	835
Canada — Total	4.7%	1,713,870

Canadian metropolitan areas with large Chinese populations:

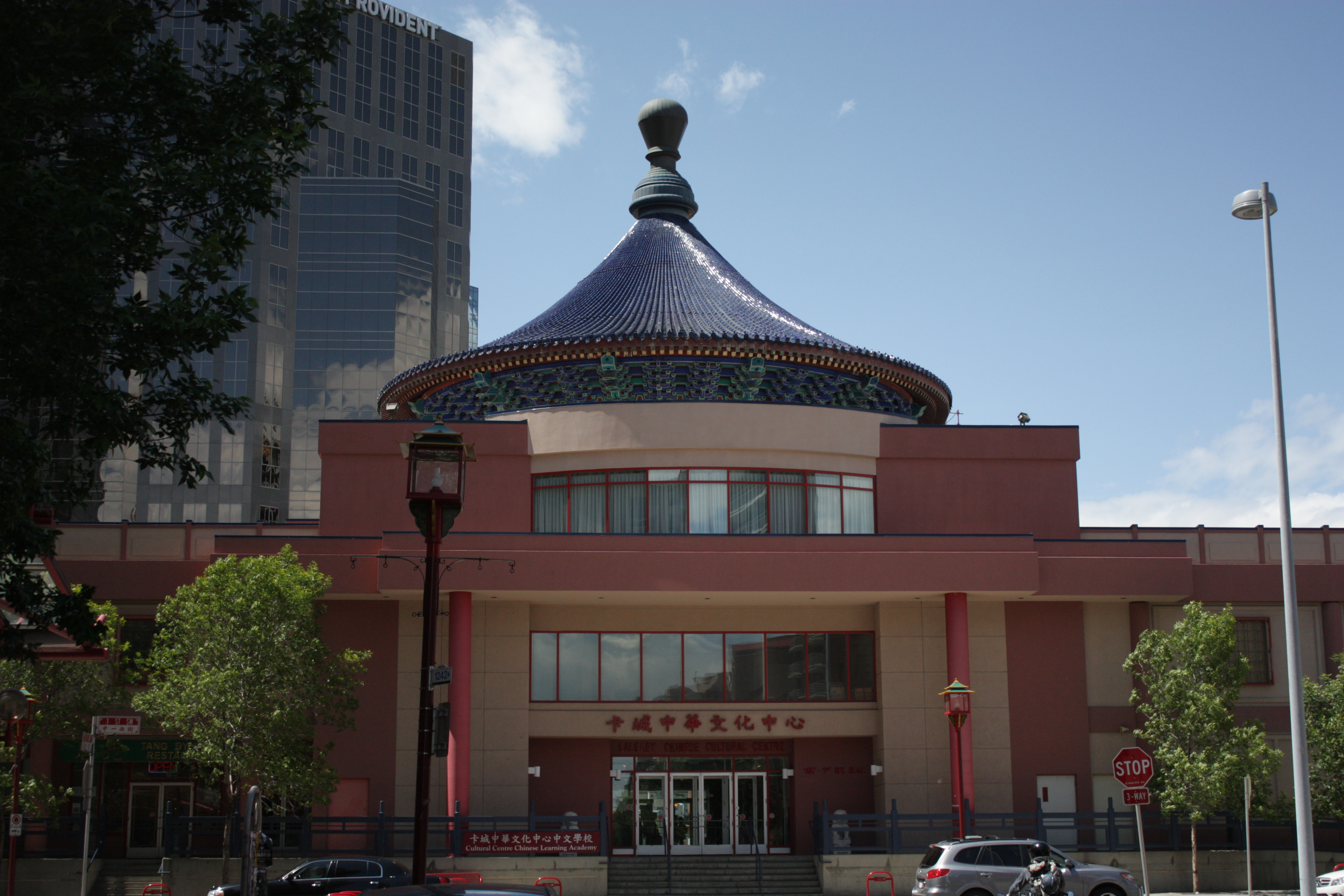
Chinese Cultural Centre in Calgary

City	Province	Chinese	Percentage
Toronto	Ontario	631,050	10.8%
Vancouver	British Columbia	474,655	19.6%
Calgary	Alberta	89,675	7%
Montreal	Quebec	89,400	2.2%
Edmonton	Alberta	60,200	4.6%
Ottawa-Gatineau	Ontario / Quebec	43,775	3.4%
Winnipeg	Manitoba	19,885	2.6%
Victoria	British Columbia	16,345	4.6%
Kitchener-Cambridge-Waterloo	Ontario	15,940	3.1%
Hamilton	Ontario	13,790	1.9%

== Socioeconomics ==
In 2001, 31% of Chinese in Canada, both foreign-born and Canadian-born, had a university education, compared with the national average of 18%.

Of prime working-age Chinese in Canada, about 20% were in sales and services; 20% in business, finance, and administration; 16% in natural and applied sciences; 13% in management; and 11% in processing, manufacturing, and utilities. However, there is a trend that Chinese move toward small towns and rural areas for agricultural and agri-food operations in recent years.

Chinese who immigrated to Canada in the 1990s and were of prime working-age in 2001 had an employment rate of 61%, which was lower than the national average of 80%. Many reported that the recognition of foreign qualifications was a major issue. However, the employment rate for Canadian-born Chinese men of prime working-age was 86%, the same as the national average. The employment rate for Canadian-born Chinese women of prime working-age was 83%, which was higher than the national average of 76%.

== Media ==
Various Chinese language media outlets in Canada operate in the Canadian media scene targeting Canadians of Chinese origin.

Newspapers

- Ming Pao Daily News - Canadian edition of Ming Pao
- Sing Tao Daily - Canadian edition of Sing Tao Daily, joint venture with Torstar
- The Epoch Times - affiliated with Falun Gong
- Sept Days
- Today Daily News – now Today's Commercial News
- World Journal – Canada edition ceased publication in 2016
- Oriental Weekly

Radio

- A1 Chinese Radio in Toronto
- CHMB in Vancouver
- Fairchild Radio CHKF-FM in Calgary
- Fairchild Radio CHKT and CIRV-FM in Toronto
- Fairchild Radio and CHKG-FM and CJVB in Vancouver

Television

- C Today TV in Toronto
- Fairchild TV across Canada
- Fairchild TV 2 HD across Canada
- LS Times TV across Canada
- New Tang Dynasty Television Canada - affiliated with Falun Gong
- Omni News across Canada
- Talentvision across Canada
- Talentvision 2 HD across Canada
- WOWtv across Canada

== Cultural adjustment and assimilation ==
According to the Canadian Ethnic Diversity Survey conducted in 2002, 76% of Canadians of Chinese origin said they had a strong sense of belonging to Canada; at the same time, 58% said that they had a strong sense of belonging to their ethnic or cultural group. Canadians of Chinese origin are also active in Canadian society; 64% of Chinese Canadians who were eligible to vote reported doing so in the 2000 federal election, while 60% said they voted in the 1996 provincial election. About 35% reported that they had participated in an organization such as a sports team or community association in the 12 months preceding the survey. 34% of Chinese Canadians also reported that in the past five years, or since they came to Canada, they have suffered discrimination, prejudice or unfair treatment, mainly from Anglo-Saxons. Most people who have experienced discrimination said that they thought it was based on Anglo-Saxon malice, while 42% believed that discrimination occurred at work or when applying for a job or promotion.

Most Canadian-born Chinese during the 1970s and 1980s were descended from immigrants of Hong Kong, while more recent Canadian-born Chinese come from mainland Chinese immigrants. Most Chinese Canadians born in Canada who have assimilated into Canadian society identify as solely Canadian while those born overseas and immigrated to Canada later in life primarily identify as a mixture of both Chinese and Canadian. In Canada, strong feelings of ethnic heritage are bolstered by the clustering of immigrant communities in large urban centres, especially because new immigrants tend to associate almost exclusively with people of the same culture due to unfamiliarity to the new mainstream culture. Canadians of Chinese origin, particularly the second generation and beyond, tend to have more liberal and Western style beliefs.

Especially in recent decades, younger generations of Chinese Canadians have increasingly sought to reconnect with their cultural heritage through language, art, and community engagement. Community-led initiatives like culture festivals, education programs, and youth organizations in Metro Vancouver have encouraged older and younger generations to connect about identity and cultural continuity

=== Heritage Preservation ===
Several cultural institutions have been established to celebrate the history, heritage, and contributions of Chinese Canadians while fostering public education and intercultural dialogue. The Chinese Canadian Museum, located in the historic Wing Sang Building in Vancouver, officially opened on July 1, 2023, with exhibitions such as The Paper Trail to the 1923 Chinese Exclusion Act highlighting community resilience and legacy. In 2025, the museum launched A Soldier for All Seasons, developed with the Chinese Canadian Military Museum Society, which documents the role of Chinese Canadians in the Second World War and its impact on citizenship rights.

The Chinese Canadian Military Museum Society, founded in 1998 and housed in the Vancouver Chinese Cultural Centre, focuses on preserving artifacts and narratives related to Chinese Canadian military service. In Toronto, the Chinese Cultural Centre of Greater Toronto, founded in 1988, serves as a hub for cultural preservation, community engagement, and educational programming. The Chinese Cultural Centre of Greater Vancouver, founded in 1973 with support from government and 53 community organizations, opened to the public in 1980. Located in Vancouver's Chinatown, it houses the Chinese Canadian Military Museum Society on its second floor and offers a range of cultural programs and events.

Beyond these major institutions, many community centres across Metro Vancouver - especially Burnaby, Vancouver's East Side, and Chinatown - look to host annual heritage events that celebrate Lunar New Year, Mid-Autumn Festival, and other traditional holidays. These organized events look to connect youth and seniors through shared cultural practices that sustain the community amid neighbourhood gentrification.

== See also ==
- Anti-Oriental riots (Vancouver)
- Canada–China relations
- Canada-Taiwan relations
- Canadian Chinese cuisine
- Chinatowns in Toronto (First Chinatown, West Chinatown & East Chinatown)
- Chinatown, Vancouver
- Chinese Canadian National Council
- Chinese Canadians in British Columbia
- Chinese Canadians in the Greater Toronto Area
- Chinese Canadians in Greater Vancouver
- Chinese head tax in Canada
- Chinese head tax in Newfoundland
- Chinese Immigration Act of 1885
- Chinese Immigration Act, 1923
- Fo Guang Shan Temple, Toronto
- Historical Chinatowns in Nanaimo & Chinatown, Victoria
- History of Chinese immigration to Canada
- International Buddhist Temple
- Ling Yen Mountain Temple
- Royal Commission on Chinese Immigration (1885)
- Taoist Tai Chi Society (Fung Institute of Taoism)
- Hong Kong Canadians
- Taiwanese Canadians
- Lost Years: A People's Struggle for Justice
