= History of Chinese immigration to Canada =

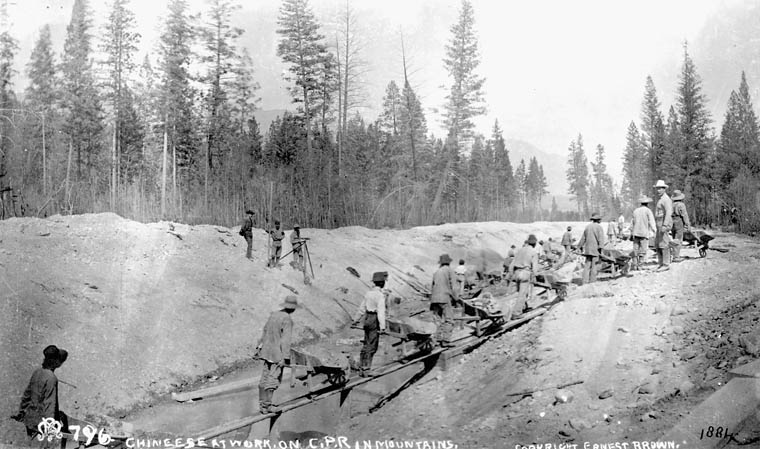
Chinese labourers working on the Canadian Pacific Railway in the mountains of British Columbia, 1881. The railway from Vancouver to Craigellachie consisted of 28 such sections, only 2% of which were constructed by workers of European origin.

Chinese immigrants began settling in Canada in the 1780s. The major periods of Chinese immigration took place from 1858 to 1923, and indefinitely from 1947, reflecting changes in the Canada's immigration policy.

Chinese immigrants were initially sought after by Canadian employers as a source of cheap labour due to Canada's relative wealth at the time and the difficult economic conditions in China. Between 1880 and 1885, the primary work for Chinese labourers in Canada was on the Canadian Pacific Railway (CPR), but records of Chinese immigration start more than a century earlier.

== Nootka Sound, 1780s ==
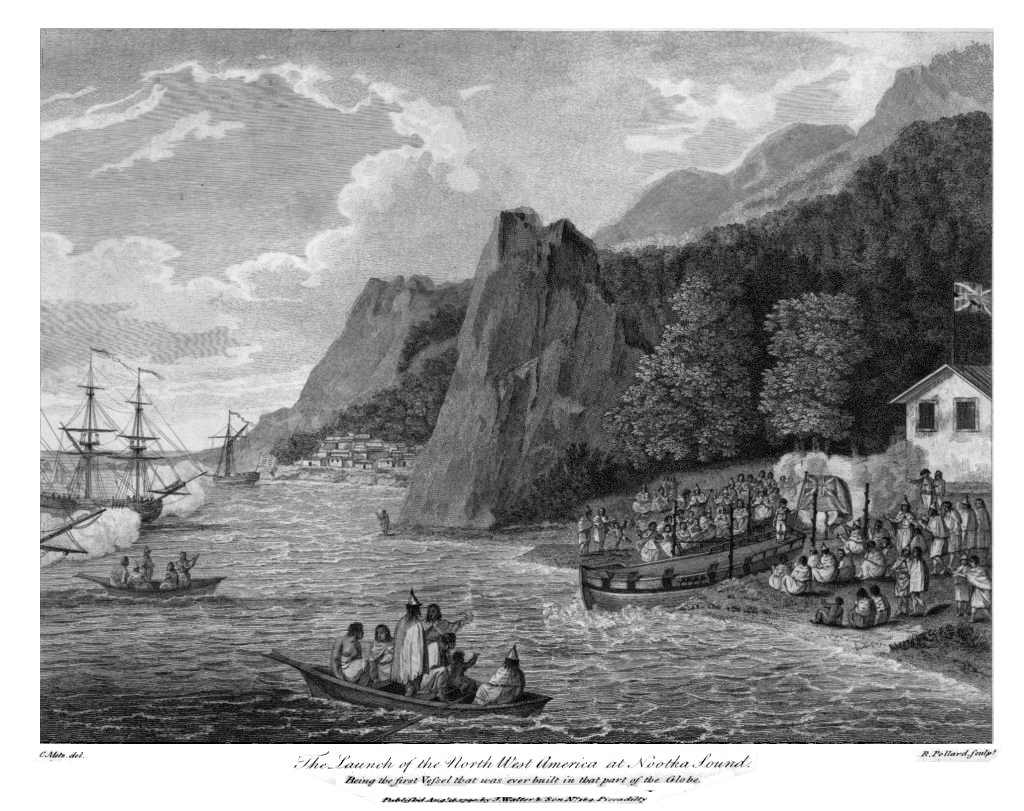
The launch of the North-West America at Nootka Sound, 1788

In 1788, some 120 Chinese contract labourers arrived at Nootka Sound, Vancouver Island. British fur trader John Meares recruited an initial group of 50 sailors and artisans from Canton (Guangzhou) and Macao, China, hoping to build a trading post and encourage trade in sea otter pelts between Nootka Sound and Canton. At Nootka Sound the Chinese workers built a dockyard, a fort, and a sailing ship named the North West America. Regarding this journey and the future prospects of Chinese settlement in colonial North America, Meares wrote:

The Chinese were, on this occasion, shipped as an experiment: they have generally been esteemed as hardy, and industrious, as well as the ingenious race of people; they live on fish and rice, and requiring low wages, it was actually not a matter also of economical consideration to employing them; and during the whole of the voyage there was every reason to be satisfied with their services. If trading posts should be established on the American coast, a colony of these men would be a very valuable acquisition.

— John Meares, Voyages Made in the Years 1788 and 1789, from China to the North West Coast of America

The next year, Meares had another 70 Chinese brought in from Canton. However, shortly after the arrival of this second group, the settlement was seized by the Spanish in what became known as the Nootka Crisis. Seeking to establish a trade monopoly on the West Coast, the Spanish imprisoned the Chinese men. It is unclear what became of them, but some probably returned to China while others were put to work in a nearby mine and later taken to Mexico. No other Chinese people are known to have arrived in western North America until the gold rush of the 1850s.

== Gold Rush, 1858 ==
The Chinese first appeared in large numbers in the Colony of Vancouver Island in 1858 as part of a huge migration from California during the Fraser Canyon Gold Rush in the newly declared Colony of British Columbia. Although the first wave arrived in May from California, news of the gold rush eventually attracted many people from China. As a result, Barkerville, British Columbia—located in the Cariboo—became Canada's first Chinese community, where more than half of the town's population was estimated to be Chinese. Several other BC towns also had significant Chinatowns, including Richfield, Stanley, Van Winkle, Quesnellemouthe (modern-day Quesnel), Antler, and Quesnelle Forks.

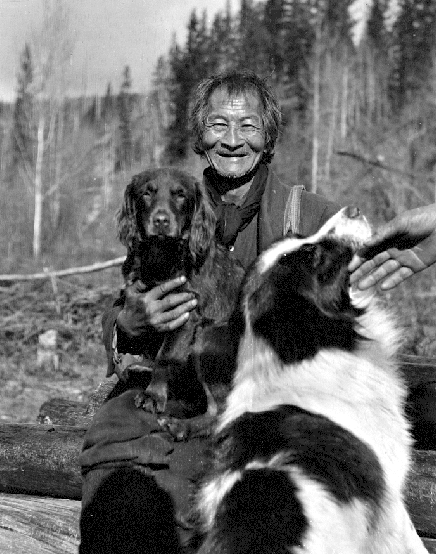
Omineca Miner Ah Hoo at Germansens Landing in 1913. Many Chinese remained in the province's Interior and North long after the gold rushes. Some towns such as Stanley were predominantly Chinese for many years, while in the Fraser Canyon and even more remote areas such as the Omineca, Chinese miners stayed on to mine claims in wilderness areas.

In the goldfields, Chinese mining techniques and knowledge turned out to be better than those of other miners. They employed hydraulic techniques, such as the use of 'rockers', and a technique whereby blankets were used to filter alluvial sand and then burned, causing the trapped gold to melt into lumps in the fire. In the Fraser Canyon, Chinese miners stayed on long after all others had left for the Cariboo Gold Rush or other goldfields elsewhere in BC or the United States. They continued hydraulic mining and farming, and owned the majority of land in the Fraser and Thompson canyons for many years afterward.

There was no shortage of successful Chinese miners: by 1860, the Chinese population of Vancouver Island and British Columbia was estimated to be 7,000. Lillooet's Chinatown lasted until the 1930s.

== Immigration for the railway, 1871–82 ==
When British Columbia (BC) agreed to join Confederation in 1871, one of its conditions was that the Government of Canada build a railway linking BC to Eastern Canada within 10 years. British Columbian politicians and their electorate agitated for a settlement-immigration program for workers from the British Isles to provide this railway labour; however, Prime Minister John A. Macdonald, along with investors and other Canadian politicians, said this would be too expensive.

In opposition, however, the Workingmen's Protective Association was established in 1878 in Victoria with the following purpose:

The objects of this society shall be the mutual protection of the working classes of British Columbia against the great influx of Chinese; to use all legitimate means for the suppression of their immigration; to assist each other in the obtaining of employment, and to devise means for the amelioration of the condition of the working classes of the Province in general.

Insisting that the project cut costs by employing Chinese workers to build the railway, Prime Minister MacDonald told Parliament in 1882: "It is simply a question of alternatives: either you must have this labour or you can't have the railway."

In 1880, Andrew Onderdonk — an American who was one of the main construction contractors in British Columbia for the Canadian Pacific Railway (CPR) — originally recruited Chinese labourers from California. When most of them deserted the railway workings for the more lucrative goldfields, Onderdonk and his agents signed several agreements with Chinese contractors in China's Guangdong province and Taiwan, as well as via Chinese companies in Victoria. These Chinese railway workers were hired for the 200 miles (320 km) of the CPR considered to be among the more difficult segments of the projected railway, particularly the area that goes through the Fraser Canyon.

Chinese-Canadian labour was characterized by low wages (usually less than 50% of what Caucasian workers were paid for the same work) and high levels of volatility. Through Onderdonk's contracts, more than 5,000 labourers were sent as "guest workers" from China by ship, and Onderdonk also recruited over 7,000 Chinese railway workers from California. These two groups of workers, who were willing to accept CA$1 a day for their labour, were the main force for the building of Onderdonk's 7% of the railway's mileage.

Between 1880 and 1885, 17,000 Chinese labourers completed the British Columbia section of the CPR, with more than 700 perishing due to appalling working conditions. As was the case with non-Chinese workers, some of the labourers fell ill during construction, or died while planting explosives or in other construction accidents.

As with railway workers on other parts of the line in the Prairies and Northern Ontario, most of the Chinese workers lived in canvas tents which were unsafe, and did not provide adequate protection against falling rocks or severe weather in mountainous areas. Such tents were typical of working-class accommodation on the frontier for all immigrant workers, although (non-Chinese) foremen, shift bosses, and trained railwaymen recruited from the UK were housed in sleeping cars and railway-built houses in Yale and the other railway towns. Chinese railway workers also established transient Chinatowns along the rail line, with housing at the largest consisting of log-houses half dug into the ground, which was a common housing style for natives as well as other frontier settlers, because of the insulating effect of the ground in an area of very low temperatures.

Largely because of the Trans-Canada railway, Chinese communities developed across the nation, with the vast majority of Chinese Canadians living in British Columbia during the 1880s.

=== Clan associations, community structure and support ===
For much of the 19th and 20th century most Chinese people in Canada were a part of clan associations (based on the tsung-tsu system), which provided a strong community support network. Membership in these associations was mostly based on surnames, assuming that people with the same surname shared a remote common ancestor. In the early 1880s, there were about 129 small clans in Canada whose members mostly came from just one or two counties in China. This reveals streams of migration from certain villages in China to locations in British Columbia, lasting through generations. There were also clan associations that limited membership based on village or county rather than surname, and two prominent associations that were free for anyone to join, the Chinese Freemasons and Kuomintang. They extend from political groups in China, but in Canada their function was not necessarily related to political activities, focusing more on economic or other activity in the local community. Many of these associations were connected in larger community networks such as the Chinese Benevolent Association (CBA). CBA represented its member associations and acted as a political body that could interact with non-affiliated non-Chinese groups. Although there was a lot of community solidarity, the clan system was sometimes a divisive force that fostered conflict or cross-association feuds. Other immigrant groups in Canada also organized mutual-aid and cultural societies and associations, but none as extensive or cross-cutting as the Chinese. The Chinese associations were organized not just as a response to discrimination but also reflected the socio-cultural peculiarities of southeastern China.

== After completion of the CPR 1885–1947 ==
From the completion of the CPR to the end of the Exclusion Era (1923–1947) which banned most Chinese immigration, Chinese in Canada lived mainly in a "bachelors of the backpack society", since most Chinese families could not pay the expensive head tax to send their daughters to Canada.

As with many other groups of immigrants, the Chinese initially found it hard to adjust and assimilate into life in Canada. In response they formed ethnic enclaves known as "Chinatowns" where they could live alongside fellow Chinese immigrants, where the vast majority of Chinese Canadians in BC lived during the 1880s. Originally, the Chinese were often stereotyped as sojourners—temporary. Especially during the 19th century, white society in British Columbia perceived the Chinese as people who could not be assimilated. In 1885, the Qing Dynasty Consul General Huang Zunxian told a Royal Commission on Chinese Immigration:

[I]t is charged that the Chinese do not emigrate to foreign countries to remain, but only to earn a sum of money and return to their homes in China. It is only about thirty years since our people commenced emigrating to other lands. A large number have gone to the Straits' Settlements, Manila, Cochin China, and the West India Islands, and are permanently settled there with their families. In Cuba, fully seventy-five percent have married native women and adopted those Islands as their future homes. Many of those living in the Sandwich Islands have done the same... You must recollect that the Chinese immigrant coming to this country is denied all the rights and privileges extended to others in the way of citizenship; the laws compel them to remain aliens. I know a great many Chinese will be glad to remain here permanently with their families if they are allowed to be naturalized and can enjoy privileges and rights.

By 1886, the population of Victoria Chinatown had increased tenfold from the completion of the CPR to over 17,000; and at the turn of the 20th century there were 17,312 Chinese settlers in Canada. By the 1940s almost 50% of the Chinese-Canadian population lived on the West Coast.

=== Immigration Acts and Exclusion Era, 1885–1947 ===
In 1885, the Government of Canada passed the Chinese Immigration Act, 1885, levying a 'Head Tax' of $50 on any Chinese—but no other ethnic group—coming to Canada. Well before the 1885 Act a series of Chinese tax acts had been passed in British Columbia. After the 1885 legislation failed to deter Chinese immigration, the Canadian government passed the Chinese Immigration Act, 1900 to increase the tax to $100. The Chinese had no choice but to pay it, although it was two years' salary for a railway worker.

==== Chinese Consolidated Benevolent Association, 1885 ====
Soon afterward, Chinese merchants among larger Chinese communities formed the Chinese Consolidated Benevolent Association (CCBA), which was registered as a charitable organization in August 1884, but effectively served as an "internal administrative institution" in the Chinese-Canadian community. The CCBA opened their first branch in Victoria in 1885 and a second in Vancouver in 1895. It was mandatory for all Chinese in the area to join the Association, which did everything from representing members in legal disputes to sending the remains of members who died back to their ancestral homelands in China.

Huang Zunxian, the Chinese consul in San Francisco, US, played an integral role in the establishment of CCBA:

Now the Honorable Huang Zun Xian permitted to forward our case to the Chinese Ambassador to England to send again an official protest to the British Government. He also instructed that we raise funds, firstly, to hire lawyers for the case, and secondly, to be prepared for the establishment of The Chinese Consolidated Benevolent Association. This Chinese representative body could, therefore, address all the issues concerning the Westerners, and do benevolence by taking care of the sick and the poor Chinese.

With the large extent of discriminatory legislation against Chinese immigrants, CCBA worked actively in seeking external support, for instance, by sending letters to the Chinese Ambassador to the United Kingdom and the Chinese Foreign Minister, as well as corresponding with the Chinese consul in San Francisco. CCBA also sent petitions to local administrations. In 1909, in response to the City of Victoria's policy of segregating Chinese children in public schools, CCBA constructed the Chinese Public School.

During the early 20th century, fraternal-political associations such as the Kuomintang and the Freemasons were involved in Chinatown politics and community issues, adjudicating disputes within the community and speaking for the community to the non-Chinese world. Legislation in 1896 stripped Chinese of voting rights in municipal elections in BC, leaving them completely disenfranchised there: the electoral list in federal elections came from the provincial list, which came from the municipal one.

==== Royal Commission and Chinese professions, 1902–07 ====
In 1902, the federal government appointed a Royal Commission on Chinese and Japanese Immigration, which concluded that "the Chinese are more unhealthy as a class than the same class of white people," and that they were "unfit for full citizenship...obnoxious to a free community and dangerous to the state." Through the Chinese Immigration Act, 1903, the Government further increased the landing fees to $500 (equivalent to CA$10,000 in 2021) following demands by B.C. politicians. Following the increase the number of Chinese who paid the fee in the first fiscal year dropped from 4,719 to 8.

In addition to federal legislation, municipal ordinances restricted employment opportunities. In BC, Chinese professionals were prohibited from practicing such professions as law, pharmacy, and accountancy. During the 40 years after 1885, following the completion of the CPR, Chinese persons became involved in the labor behind an industrializing economy. With legislation banning Chinese from many professions, Chinese entered those that non-Chinese Canadians did not want to do, such as laundry shops or salmon processing. Skilled or semi-skilled, Chinese Canadians labored in British Columbia sawmills and canneries; others became market gardeners or grocers, pedlars, shopkeepers, and restaurateurs. A "credit-ticket" system evolved in this time whereby Chinese lenders in China or North America would agree to pay the travel expenses of a migrant who was then bound to the lender until the debt was repaid, although such contracts were not binding in Canada. Chinese workers opened grocery stores and restaurants that served the whole population, including non-Chinese, and Chinese cooks became the mainstay in the restaurant and hotel industries as well as in private service. Chinese success at market-gardening led to a continuing prominent role in the produce industry in British Columbia. Ethnic discrimination was rampant during these times, as evidenced by large-scale Anti-Asian Riots in Vancouver in 1907.

==== Exclusion Act, 1923 ====
The Chinese Immigration Act, 1923, better known as the "Chinese Exclusion Act", replaced prohibitive fees with an outright ban on Chinese immigration to Canada, with the exceptions of merchants, diplomats, students, and "special circumstances" cases. Ethnic Chinese people with British nationality were also banned. The Chinese who had entered Canada before 1924 had to register with the local authorities and could not re-enter if they had been away from Canada for more than two years.

Just before the enactment of the Exclusion Act, the Chinese Association of Canada went to Ottawa to lobby against the bill. Since the Act went into effect on 1 July 1923, Chinese people at the time referred to Dominion Day as "Humiliation Day" and refused to celebrate Dominion Day until after the act was repealed in 1947. Vancouver's Chinatown during the exclusion era became a thriving economic and social destination that was home to many Chinese Canadians on the West Coast.

The discriminatory laws also gave way to a gender imbalance among Chinese immigrants. Primarily due to the head tax, the cost of bringing a dependant, such as a wife or aged parents, to Canada became prohibitive. Consequently Chinese men typically came alone, living as bachelors in Canada. In 1886, there were only 119 females among a total population of 1,680; in 1931, only 3,648 were women among a total Chinese population of 46,519. A survey carried out in 1922 by Republican China's Overseas Chinese Bureau showed that, among Victoria Chinatown's whole population of 3,681, only 456 were females. In the late 1920s, it was estimated that there were only five married Chinese women in Calgary, and six in Edmonton.

== Post-war period,1947–99 ==
After the Chinese Immigration Act, 1923 was repealed in 1947, the majority of ethnic Chinese who immigrated to Canada until the early 1970s came from the People's Republic of China, Hong Kong, and the Republic of China (Taiwan). Other ethnic Chinese immigrants came from South Asia, Southeast Asia, South Africa, the Caribbean, and South America. Chinese-Canadians gained the vote federally and provincially in 1947. However, Chinese immigration was still limited to the spouses and dependants of ethically Chinese men with Canadian citizenship.

After the founding of the People's Republic of China (PRC) in October 1949 and its support for the communist North in the Korean War, Chinese in Canada were viewed as communist agents from the PRC and faced another wave of resentment. Moreover, those from mainland China who were eligible in the family reunification program had first to visit the Canadian High Commission in Hong Kong, as Canada and the PRC did not have diplomatic relations until 1970.

=== Chinese Adjustment Statement Program and other policies, 1960–73 ===
In 1959, the Department of Citizenship and Immigration discovered a problem with immigration papers used by Chinese immigrants to enter Canada, and the Royal Canadian Mounted Police were brought in to investigate. Some Chinese had been entering Canada by purchasing real or fake birth certificates of Chinese-Canadian children in Hong Kong. Children carrying false identity papers were referred to as paper sons. In response, Minister of Citizenship and Immigration Ellen Fairclough announced the "Chinese Adjustment Statement Program" on 9 June 1960, which granted amnesty for paper sons or daughters if they confessed to the government. About 12,000 paper sons came forward, until the amnesty period ended in October 1973.

Independent Chinese immigration to Canada came after Canada eliminated race and the "place of origin" section from its immigration policy in 1967. Four years later, in 1971, an official policy of multiculturalism was implemented in efforts to tackle institutional racism.

Many Chinese enlisted in the Canadian forces despite Ottawa and the BC government being unwilling to send Chinese-Canadian recruits into action, since they did not want Chinese to ask for enfranchisement after the war. However, with 90,000 British troops captured in the Battles of Malaya and Singapore in February 1942, Ottawa decided to send Chinese-Canadian forces in as spies to train the local guerrillas to resist the Japanese Imperial forces in 1944. These spies were nevertheless little more than a token gesture, as the outcome of World War II had been more or less decided by that time.

=== Late 1970s ===
A turning point for Chinese in Canada was an incident in September 1979 involving a report on a high-profile current affairs series on commercial Canadian TV, W5, which stated that foreign Chinese were taking away opportunities from Canadian citizens for university education. In response, Chinese communities nationwide united to fight anti-Chinese sentiments.

The report, suggesting that there were 100,000 foreign students, featured a girl complaining that her high marks had not allowed her into the University of Toronto's pharmacy program because seats had been taken up by foreign students.

The data used in the report, however, proved to be inaccurate. The Canadian Bureau for International Education revealed that there were only 55,000 foreign students in Canada at all levels of education, and only 20,000 full-time foreign university students. Historian Anthony B. Chan devoted an entire chapter of his 1983 book Gold Mountain to the incident, and found that, contrary to the claims of the prospective pharmacy student, there were no foreign students in Toronto's program that year. Chan emphasized the anger that the Chinese-Canadian community had about the images of anonymous Chinese people in the feature was because they felt the "implication was that all students of Chinese origin were foreigners, and that Canadian taxpayers were subsidizing Chinese students—regardless of citizenship."

Chinese communities nationwide staged protests against CTV Television, the network that airs W5. Initially, CTV would only offer a "statement of regret" but the protests continued until it apologized in 1980. Network executive Murray Chercover acknowledged the inaccuracy of a great deal of the program's information, adding that the network "sincerely apologize[s] for the fact Chinese-Canadians were depicted as foreigners, and for whatever distress this stereotyping may have caused them in the context of our multicultural society." The protesters met in Toronto in 1980 and agreed to form the Chinese Canadian National Council (CCNC) to better represent Chinese Canadians on a national level.

=== 1980s–90s ===
The 1980s saw movement of Chinese in Canada from the ethnic enclaves of Chinatowns to outlying suburbs of major Canadian cities. This movement was seen by some as changing the fabric of some communities with the establishment of new ethnic enclaves, commercial areas, and use of Chinese-language signage. Carole Bell, Deputy Mayor of Markham, Ontario, said that the overwhelming Chinese presence in the city was causing other residents to move out of Markham. Additionally during the 1980s, local communities in Toronto and Vancouver blamed the Chinese immigrants for hyperinflating property prices.

During the mid-1980s and early 1990s, Canada's recession and growth of the Chinese economy resulted in a shift in Chinese migration in Canada. Attracted by the employment opportunities back home, some newer immigrants moved back, with many retaining their Canadian citizenship. This resulted in the phenomenon of astronaut families, where the husband and money-earner would only visit Canada once or twice a year, usually in December or in summer, while the rest of the family would live in Canada.

The Chinese community also sought redress for past injustices done against them. Since the early 1980s, there has been a campaign to redress the Head Tax paid by Chinese entering Canada from 1885 to 1923, led by the CCNC. However, the movement did not gather enough support to be noticed by the government until the 1990s. Still, the government was largely resistant to the calls to apologize and refund the head tax to the payers or their descendants. Canadian courts also ruled that while the government had no legal obligation to redress the head tax, it had a moral obligation to do so. The Liberal governments of the 1990s adopted the position of "no apology, no compensation" as the basis of negotiating with the Chinese groups and were criticized for stonewalling the Chinese community.

==== Immigrants from Hong Kong, late 1990s ====
With the political uncertainties as Hong Kong headed towards transfer of sovereignty from the UK to China in 1997, many Hong Kong residents chose to emigrate to Canada, as it was easier for them to enter Canada than many other countries due to their Commonwealth of Nations connections. In addition the US set fixed quotas for different nationalities, while Canada ran on a "points" system, allowing immigrants to arrive if they had desirable attributes such as graduate degrees, training, funds to start new businesses and language abilities.

According to statistics compiled by the Canadian Consulate in Hong Kong, from 1991 to 1996, "about 30,000 Hong Kongers emigrated annually to Canada, comprising over half of all Hong Kong emigration and about 20% of the total number of immigrants to Canada." The great majority of these people settled in the Toronto and Vancouver areas, with well-established Chinese communities. After the handover, there was a sharp decline in immigration numbers, possibly indicating a smooth transition towards political stability. In the following years the unemployment and underemployment of many Hong Kong immigrants in Canada prompted many to return.

== Immigration in the 21st century ==
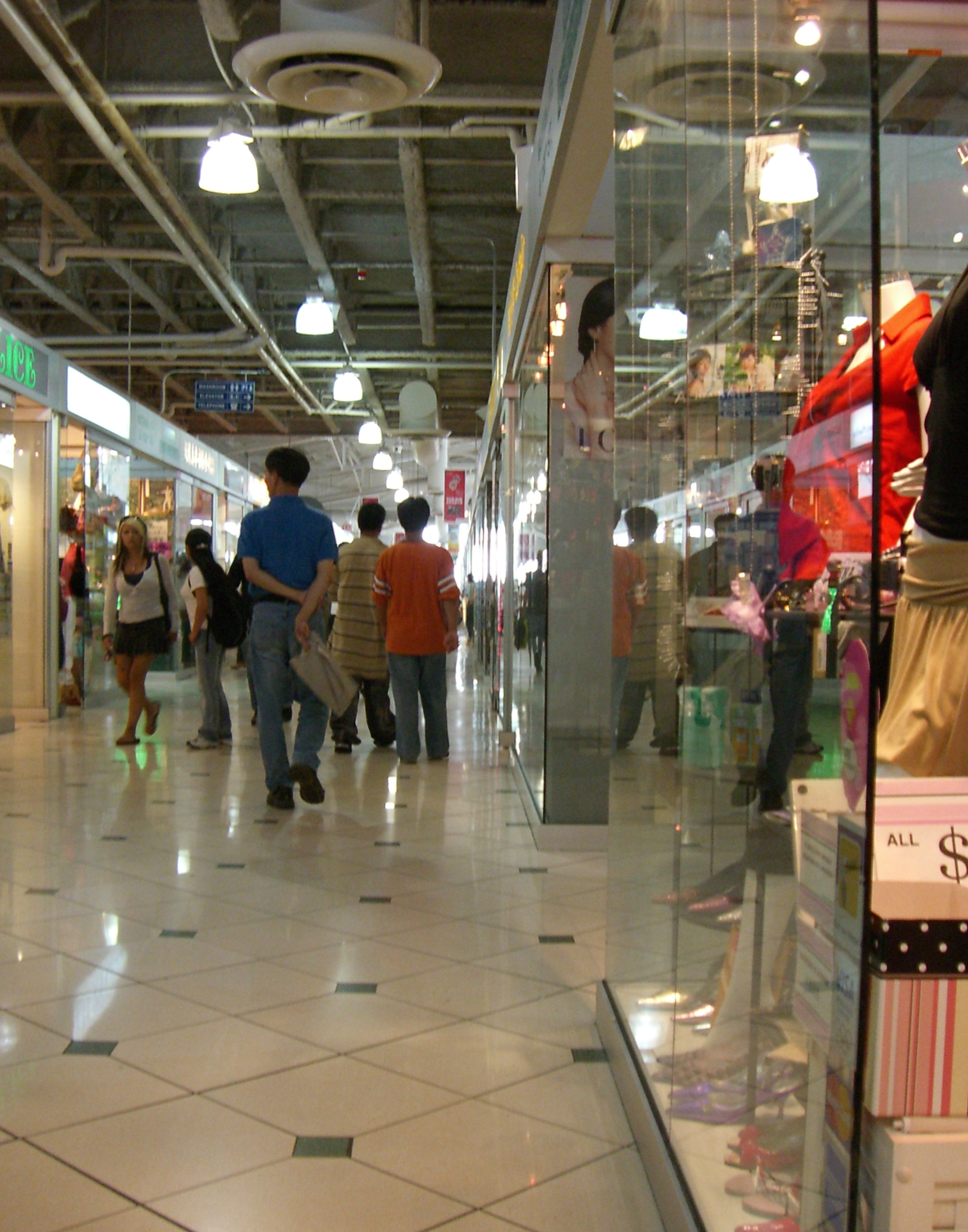
Pacific Mall in Markham consists of some 400 shops catering to Chinese-Canadians

Today, Mainland China has taken over from Hong Kong as the largest source of Chinese immigration, and become the origin of most immigration to Canada in general. A great number of immigrants have been Cantonese speakers, and a disproportionate representation of Cantonese over other Chinese immigrants is prevalent in many Chinese communities in Canada. According to statistics from Citizenship and Immigration Canada (CIC), between 1999 and 2009 the largest number of immigrants to Canada came from the PRC. CIC statistics for 2002 showed that Canadian immigration from the PRC averaged well over 30,000 per year, being an average of 15% of all immigrants to Canada. This trend had shown no sign of slowing down by 2005, with an all-time high of 42,295. By 2010, 36,580 immigrants from the Philippines surpassed the 30,195 from the PRC. Filipinos retained their status as the largest immigrant group to Canada in 2011 with 34,991, against the PRC with 28,696.

Chinese-Canadians have become more involved in politics, both provincially and federally. Douglas Jung (1957–1962) not only became the first Canadian Member of Parliament (MP) of Chinese and Asian descent in the House of Commons, but also the first member of a visible minority elected to the Parliament of Canada. In 1993, Raymond Chan became the first ethnic Chinese to be appointed into the cabinet, after winning the riding of Richmond in the 1993 federal election. Many Chinese-Canadians have run for office in subsequent Canadian elections:

- After two failed attempts, New Democratic Party candidate Olivia Chow (wife of NDP leader Jack Layton) was elected in the 2006 federal election, representing the riding of Trinity—Spadina, and in 2023 was elected as Mayor of Toronto, Ontario.
- Alan Lowe became the first Chinese-Canadian Mayor of Victoria, British Columbia (1999–2008).
- Ida Chong was a Saanich, British Columbia municipal councillor before being elected in 2001 as a BC provincial cabinet minister in Liberal Premier Gordon Campbell's administration.
- The Bloc Québécois had an ethnic-Chinese candidate, May Chiu, running in the riding of LaSalle—Émard against Liberal Party leader Paul Martin during the 2006 election.
- Philip Lee became the first Asian Lieutenant-Governor in Manitoba.
- Norman Kwong, Canada's first professional Chinese-Canadian football player, also became Alberta's first Chinese Lieutenant-Governor.

Because of the influx of Chinese emigrants from the global diaspora, community organizations reflecting Chinese people from Cuba, India, Jamaica, Mauritius, Peru, and so on, have established a considerable presence in Canada. Immigrants from the PRC have organized into many associations. The Chinese Professionals Association of Canada (CPAC) reported having a membership of over 30,000 in 2019. In terms of education, the Chinese Canadian Historical Society of British Columbia was created in 2004 to educate the general public about Chinese people in Canada; the University of Toronto's Richard Charles Lee Canada-Hong Kong Library is a dedicated resource centre for Chinese-Canadian studies; the Toronto-based Chinese Culture and Education Society of Canada teaches Chinese and aims to develop education and cultural exchanges between Canada and China.

=== Apology and redress, 2004–06 ===
During the 2004 federal election campaign, NDP leader Jack Layton pledged to issue an apology and compensation for the Exclusion-Era head tax. After the 2006 election, the newly elected Conservative Party indicated in its Throne Speech that it would provide a formal apology and appropriate redress to families affected by racist policies of the past. It concluded a series of National Consultations across Canada in 2006, from 21 to 30 April, in Halifax, Vancouver, Toronto, Edmonton, Montreal, and Winnipeg.

The Liberal Party, which lost the 2006 election (as the outgoing government) changed their positions and were accused of "flip-flopping" on the issue during the election campaign as well as being questioned about their sincerity. Many Chinese, particularly the surviving head-tax payers and their descendants criticized Raymond Chan, the Chinese-Canadian cabinet minister who was left in charge of settling the matter, for compromising the Chinese community in favour of the government and misleading the public.

On 22 June 2006, Prime Minister Stephen Harper delivered a message of redress in the House of Commons, offering an apology in Cantonese and compensation for the head tax once paid by Chinese immigrants. Survivors or their spouses were paid approximately CA$20,000 in compensation. Although their children were not offered this payment, Chinese Canadian leaders like Joseph Wong regarded it as an important and significant move in Chinese Canadian history. There were about 20 people who paid the tax still alive in 2006.

== See also ==
- Chinese head tax in Canada
- Chinese head tax in Newfoundland
- Chinese Immigration Act, 1923
- Immigration to Canada
- Chinese Canadians in British Columbia
- Chinese Canadians in Ontario
- Asiatic Exclusion League
- Lost Years: A People's Struggle for Justice
