= Bill Chong =

Canadian spy (1911–2006)

- 鄭根
- Chong in 1943
- Born: William Gun Chong; July 15, 1911; Vancouver, Dominion of Canada
- Died: October 18, 2006 (aged 95); Vancouver, Canada
- Military career
- Allegiance: Canada
- Nickname: Agent 50

William Gun Chong BEM (Chinese: 鄭根; 1911–2006) was a Canadian spy who served in the British Military Intelligence unit MI9 during World War II. He is the only Chinese Canadian to be awarded the British Empire Medal, the highest honor that Britain awards to non-British citizens.

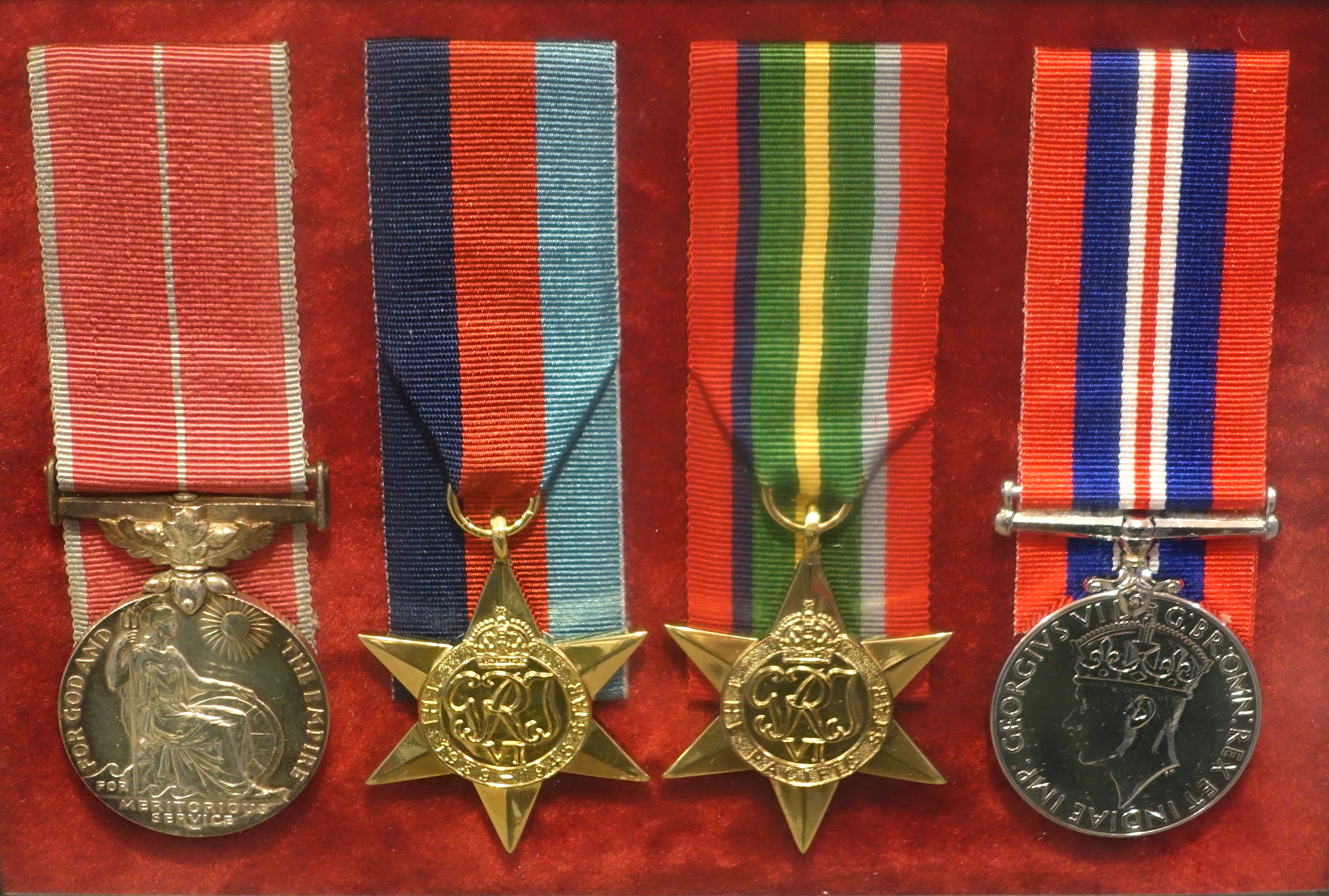
Chong's medals exhibited in the Chinese Canadian Military Museum.

== Life ==
Chong was born in Vancouver on July 15, 1911. He had little formal education and was employed as a cook and houseboy.

Chong was visiting Hong Kong when Japan invaded in 1941. He escaped to free China where he joined the British Army Aid Group, a paramilitary unit of MI9. Chong then was a British spy, known as Agent 50, who operated behind Japanese lines in occupied China. After the war Chong returned to Canada and operated a cafe on Vancouver Island.

== Wartime experiences ==
Chong travelled back and forth between free and Japanese-occupied areas of China. Chong's main tasks were to smuggle medical supplies into the occupied area, and smuggle people and intelligence out. He dressed as a beggar and always travelled on foot, often walking 30 miles (48.3 km) per day. His walking cane hid medicines and documents.

The people Chong smuggled were British and Commonwealth subjects and stranded Allied aviators. Chong did not recognize two of his charges as the chief justice and prosecutor of Hong Kong, until after the war when he was called as a witness in a trial of a collaborator.

Chong was captured by the Japanese and escaped twice. One time he escaped from the hold of a fishing boat. The other time he escaped immediately before execution when his compatriot spoke in Japanese and displayed the business card of a Japanese officer.
