= Chinese Consolidated Benevolent Association and Chinese Public School =

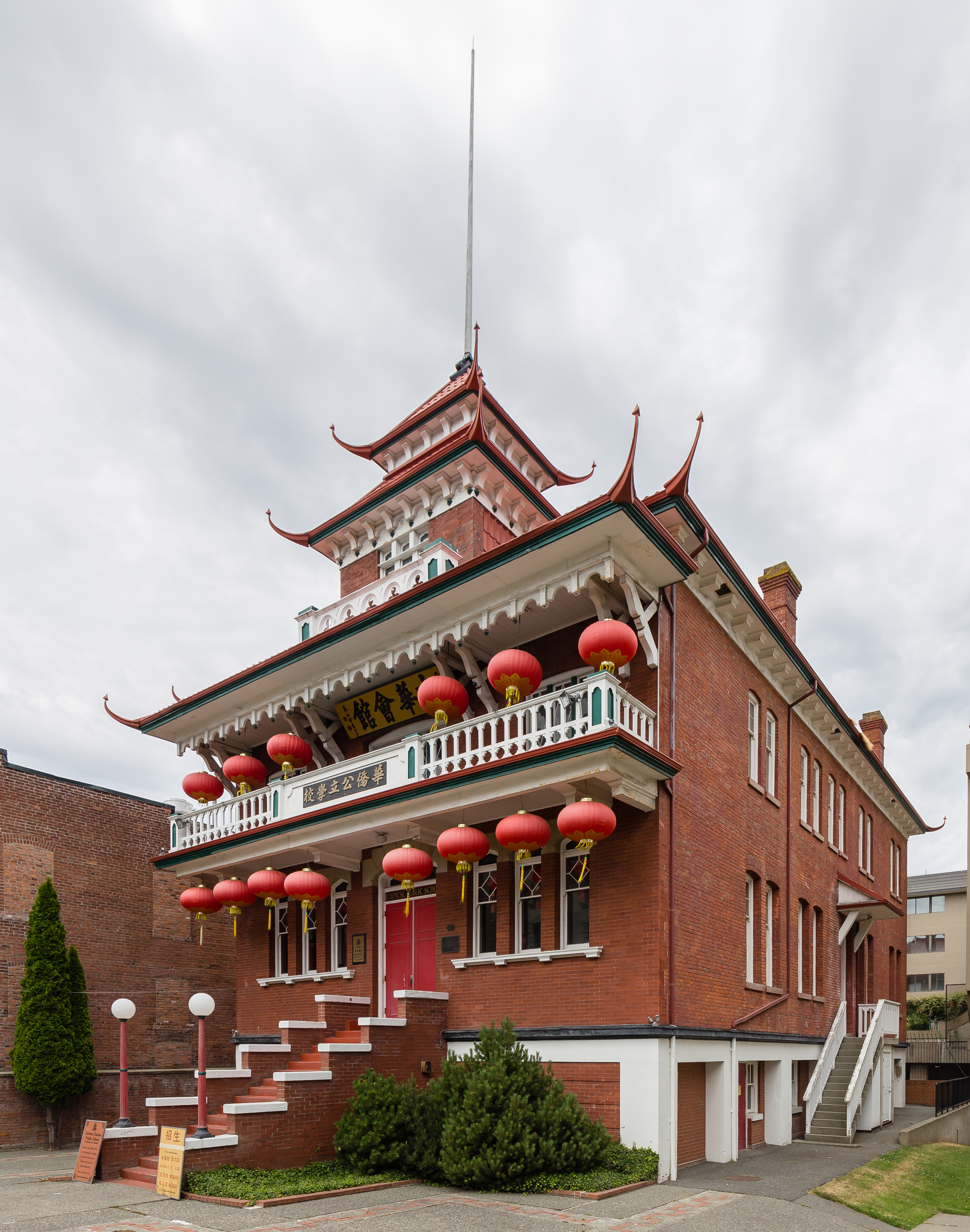
- The building's exterior in 2012
- Interactive map of the Chinese Consolidated Benevolent Association and Chinese Public School area

General information
- Location: 636 Fisgard Street; Victoria, British Columbia; V8W 1R6
- Coordinates: 48°25′46.819″N 123°21′56.844″W
- Completed: 1909
- Opened: 1909

Technical details
- Floor count: 5

Website
- www.victoriabbs.com/sponsors/vcps.html

The Chinese Consolidated Benevolent Association and Victoria Chinese Public School (Chinese: 中華會館和域多利華僑公立學校) is a historic building located in the downtown core of Victoria, British Columbia, Canada.

The Chinese Public School was built in 1909 by the Chinese Consolidated Benevolent Association (CCBA) in response to the racial and cultural segregation imposed by the school board and government, which banned Chinese students from City schools until they spoke English. The school continues to provide Cantonese and Mandarin-language education.

== See also ==
- List of historic places in Victoria, British Columbia
