= CCCTV =

- Country: Canada
- Broadcast area: National
- Headquarters: Markham, Ontario

Programming
- Picture format: 480i (SDTV)

Ownership
- Owner: Canada Global Media Investment Inc.

Links
- Website: ccctv.ca

CCCTV is a Canadian Chinese-language specialty channel broadcasts programming in Cantonese and Mandarin and airs content from China, Hong Kong and Taiwan as well as local Canadian programming.

CCCTV is a general entertainment service and features a wide array of programming including news, sports, dramas, traditional operas, cultural programmes and much more. It also airs extensive local programming includes news, traffic and weather reports as well as sports shows and business shows.
