= Today Daily News (Toronto) =

Chinese language newspaper in Ontario

- Type: Daily newspaper
- Format: Tabloid
- Publisher: Herbert Moon
- Founded: 2005
- Political alignment: Conservative
- Language: Chinese
- Headquarters: 38 Milner Avenue, Toronto, Ontario M3S 3P8
- Price: Mon-Sat: 25￠ Sun: $1.50
- Website: Official web site (no longer valid)

Today Daily News
- Chinese: 現代日報
Transcriptions
Standard Mandarin
- Hanyu Pinyin: Xiàndài Rìbào
- Wade–Giles: Hsientai Jihpao
- Tongyong Pinyin: Siàndài Rìhbào
- Yale Romanization: Syàndài R̀bàu
- IPA: [ɕjɛ̂ntâɪ ɻɻ̩̂pâʊ]
Yue: Cantonese
- Yale Romanization: Yihndoih Yahtbou
- Jyutping: Jin6 doi6 jat6 bou3
- IPA: [jɪ̀ntɔ̀ːi jɐ̀tpōu]

Today Daily News (Chinese: 現代日報; pinyin: Xiàndài Rìbào) was a Chinese language newspaper in Canada, launched on November 1, 2005. It was published by Today Daily News International in Scarborough.

It was called the Canada Eastern Edition (加東版 Pinyin: jiā dōng bǎn) even though it was the only edition published at the moment.

The paper was published 7 days a week in traditional Chinese in the broadsheet format. News coverage includes headline news, news at the metro and national levels, news from Greater China, Chinese community news, international news, entertainment, financial news, sports, and supplements.

The paper did not own its own printing press; printing is being contracted out to a printer.

Compared with the other three main Chinese newspapers, the reporting style of Today Daily News was relatively sensationalist. The reporting style seems to be approximately comparable to the Toronto Sun, but not as sensationalist as the likes of Apple Daily or the Hong Kong Sun.

In 2008, Toronto Sun acquired a 50% stake in the paper.

== The online version ==
Today Daily News was also published online on the World Wide Web but the old domain address redirected to Today Commercial News which opened to a landing page of several Chinese publications, none of them called Today Daily News.

The online version contained an exact copy of the day's newspaper; back issues were online for 7 days. Access was free of charge.

== Supplements (magazines) ==
Two weekly magazine were distributed free of charge as supplements:

- Saturday—Today BQ Magazine (現代北京青年週刊) was in tabloid size; it was a lifestyle-and-entertainment magazine from Beijing, China which is published in simplified Chinese.

It had the Home Guide Magazine contents inside, with information on Greater Toronto's new, resale and rental homes. Its editorial contents of home improvement and renovation originated from the Sun Media. Today BQ served primarily the Mandarin-speaking Chinese immigrants from Mainland China.

- Sunday-701 was the most popular entertainment magazine, with hot gossips on celebrities and stars, fashion and fad from Hong Kong's Oriental Sunday(東方新地). It was printed in art glossy paper.

701 served primarily the Cantonese-speaking Chinese immigrants from Hong Kong.

== Launch ==
Today Daily News and its website were launched in November 2005. The domain has since expired and currently appears to be parked and monetized with advertising by the domain holder, Network Solutions LLC.

== Rivals ==
- The Epoch Times (Chinese)
- Ming Pao Daily News
- Sing Tao Daily
- World Journal

== See also ==
- List of newspapers in Canada
