= International Buddhist Temple =

Chinese Buddhist temple in Richmond, British Columbia, Canada

- 國際佛教觀音寺
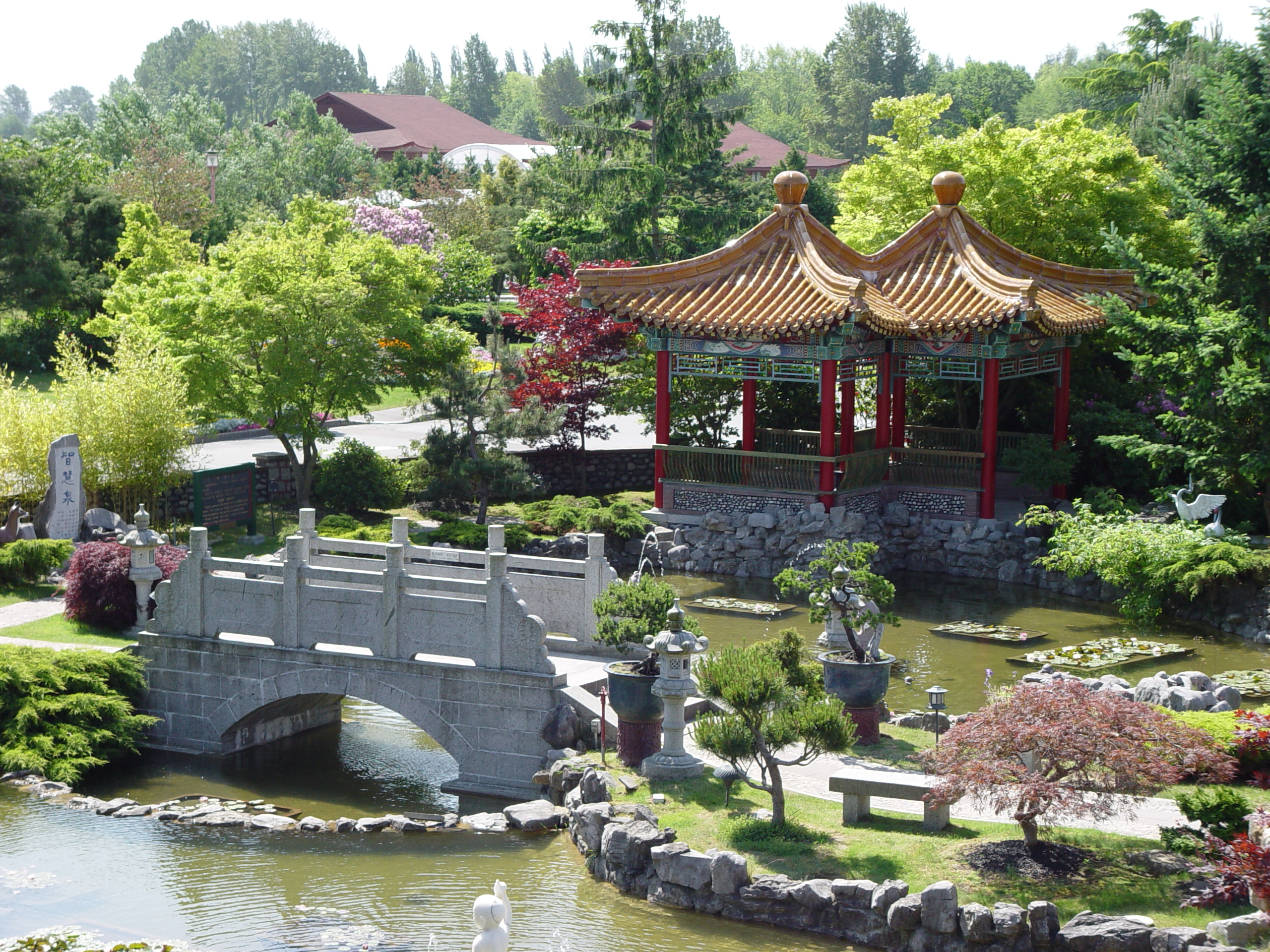
- A corner of the Chinese garden at the International Buddhist Temple

Religion
- Affiliation: Buddhism
- Sect: Mahayana and Theravada
- Ownership: International Buddhist Society
- Year consecrated: 1983
- Status: Active

Location
- Location: Richmond, British Columbia
- Country: Canada
- Interactive map of International Buddhist Temple
- Coordinates: 49.1332°N 123.1234°W

Website
- buddhisttemple.ca

The International Buddhist Temple (Chinese: 國際佛教觀音寺; pinyin: Guójì Fójiào Guānyīn Sì; lit. 'Guan Yin Temple') is located in Richmond, British Columbia, Canada. It is a Chinese Buddhist temple run by the International Buddhist Society.

While the Society officially practices Mahayana Buddhism, the temple is open to Theravada Buddhist affiliates and visitors, as well as visitors of all religious and unique cultural backgrounds.

== History ==
In 1979, two Buddhists from Hong Kong donated land and funds to the cause of building an authentic Chinese Buddhist temple in North America. The International Buddhist Society was established in 1981 for this cause by the Venerable Guan Cheng and five other individuals. The International Buddhist Temple officially opened to the public after two years, when its Main Hall was completed.

Thousands of people, including Richmond's mayor and Member of Parliament, attended the inauguration ceremony in 1986.

== International Buddhist Society ==
The International Buddhist Society is a non-profit organization and a registered Canadian charity. It sponsors charitable programs both in Canada and abroad. Some of the Society's efforts include:

- Donations to the Food Bank
- Rescuing and releasing sealife and other creatures
- Support for the poor and disadvantaged in rural China
- Aid for students and the elderly

The Society also hosts free events for the community, such as Senior's Day celebrations with free vegetarian lunches for seniors at the temple.

== The Venerable Guan Cheng ==
The Venerable Guan Cheng has been the head of the Society and the temple's Abbot since 1999. A student of Buddhism for more than 40 years, he was ordained in 1999 by the Venerable Master Xu Lang, at the Miao Fa Monastery in the US.

The abbot speaks Cantonese, English, and Mandarin, and has a B.A. and M.B.A. from the University of Toronto. He was one of two delegates for Canada at the First World Buddhist Forum in China. He travels widely to spread Buddhist teachings and perform charity work, and holds frequent lectures and classes.

He hosts a radio show on AM1320 (Overseas Chinese Voice) in Vancouver, and Metroshowbiz FM99.7 in Hong Kong. He is also a columnist for Hong Kong's Buddhist Compassion Magazine.

The Venerable Guan Cheng has written and published: Happiness Originates from the Mind (2003), How to Attain Happiness by Appeasing One's Mind (2004), Prajna-Paramita Hirdya Sutra Commentary (2006), and A Bouquet of Incense from the Heart (2006).

== Architecture ==
The temple is the most authentic structure of traditional Chinese palatial (imperial) style in North America. Its design is based on the Forbidden City in Beijing, China. The International Buddhist Temple features golden tiles on its two-tiered roof, flared eaves, and two scholar's courtyards. Beyond the main courtyard is the classical Chinese garden with lotus ponds, twin gazebos, rock landscapes, and a stone bridge. One attraction is the flowing Wisdom Fountain at the edge of the pond. Worshipers believe that water from the Wisdom Fountain has cleansing properties and other benefits. There is also the Siddhartha Gautama Pool, in which nine white dragons spout water towards the sky. They represent the nine heavenly dragons which bathed Prince Siddhartha Gautama as a newborn.

At the centre of the temple is the Main Gracious Hall. Beneath its Northern imperial Chinese exterior of gold and red is a Western structural frame of concrete and steel. It houses five great Buddha and Bodhisattva statues. The statue of Buddha Sakyamuni is the largest in North America. The building contains a gift shop.

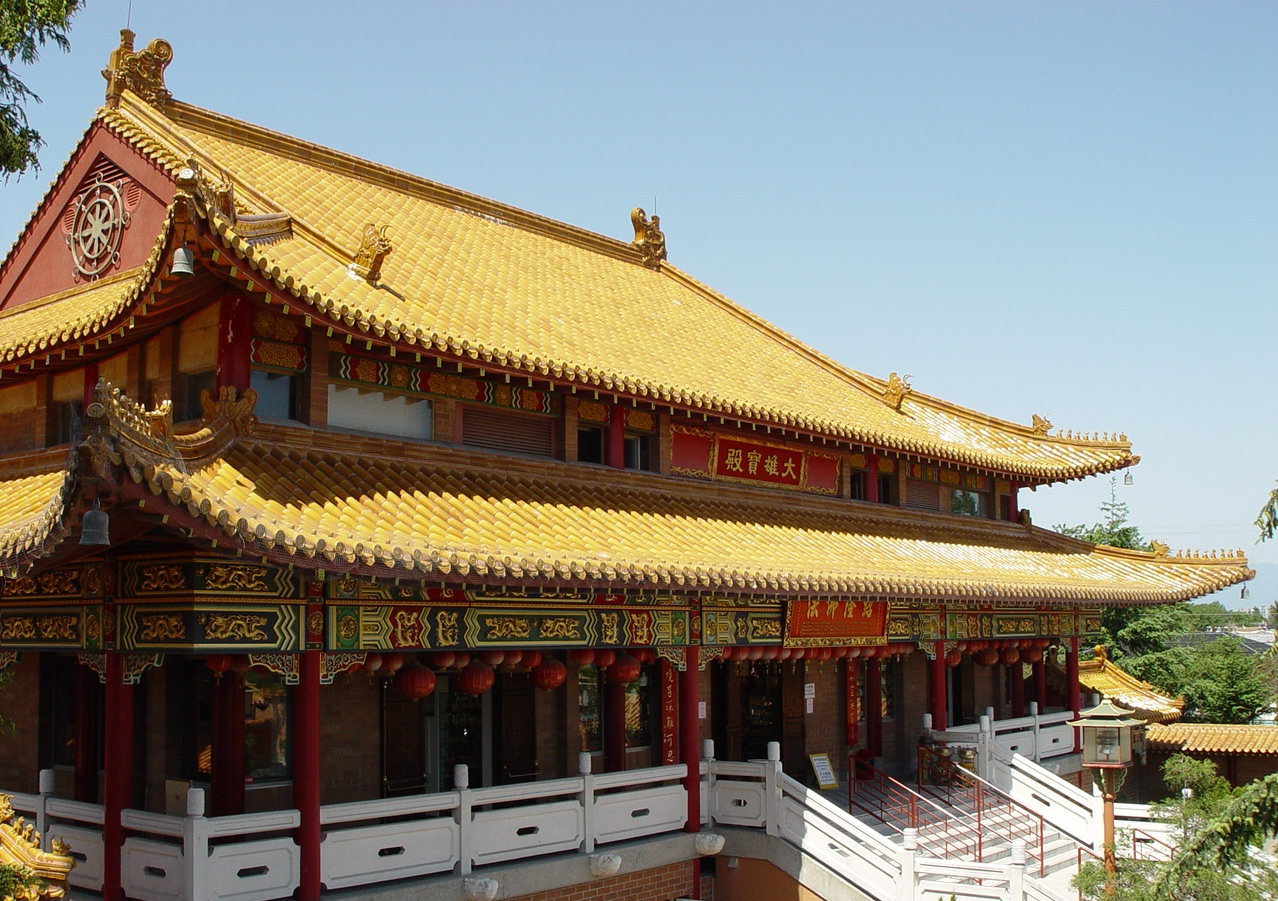
Entrance to the Main Gracious Hall

Across from the Main Hall in the Worshiping Square is the Seven Buddha Pavilion. Within it are the Four Heavenly Kings and the Avalokitesvara Buddha, or Guan-Yin, with a thousand hands and eyes.

There are also a Thousand Buddha Hall, Ksitigarbha (Ancestral) Hall, and Meditation Hall, as well as many smaller shrines on the grounds. As of 2007, the temple is still undergoing expansions.

== Art ==
From 1986 to 1991, the Society held a monthly Chinese art exhibition, Karma of the Brush. All artists in the Greater Vancouver area were welcome to share their works with the public. Out of this arose the Seven Buddha Mural, painted by one of the artists and founders of the exhibition, Fung Kai Mun. It took two years to complete, and is currently the largest Buddhist mural in the world.

The wall facing the garden displays the Amitabha Buddha mural. It is engraved with the Buddha's name as a reminder of the Mahayana goal of rebirth into the Amitabha Buddha's Pure Land.

The Venerable Guan Cheng has an interest in gardening and landscape. All of the flower arrangements around the temple, as well as the garden, are designed by the abbot with both Chinese tradition and Buddhist aesthetics in mind. There are also bonsai, and Buddhist idioms carved in stone.

The entrance of the International Buddhist Temple is inspired by Deer Park, with its gentle slopes, trees, and artificial deer. Deer Park was where the Buddha Sakyamuni gave his first sermons to his followers. There are also several other Buddhist stories and historical events tied to the place.

== Programs and Services ==
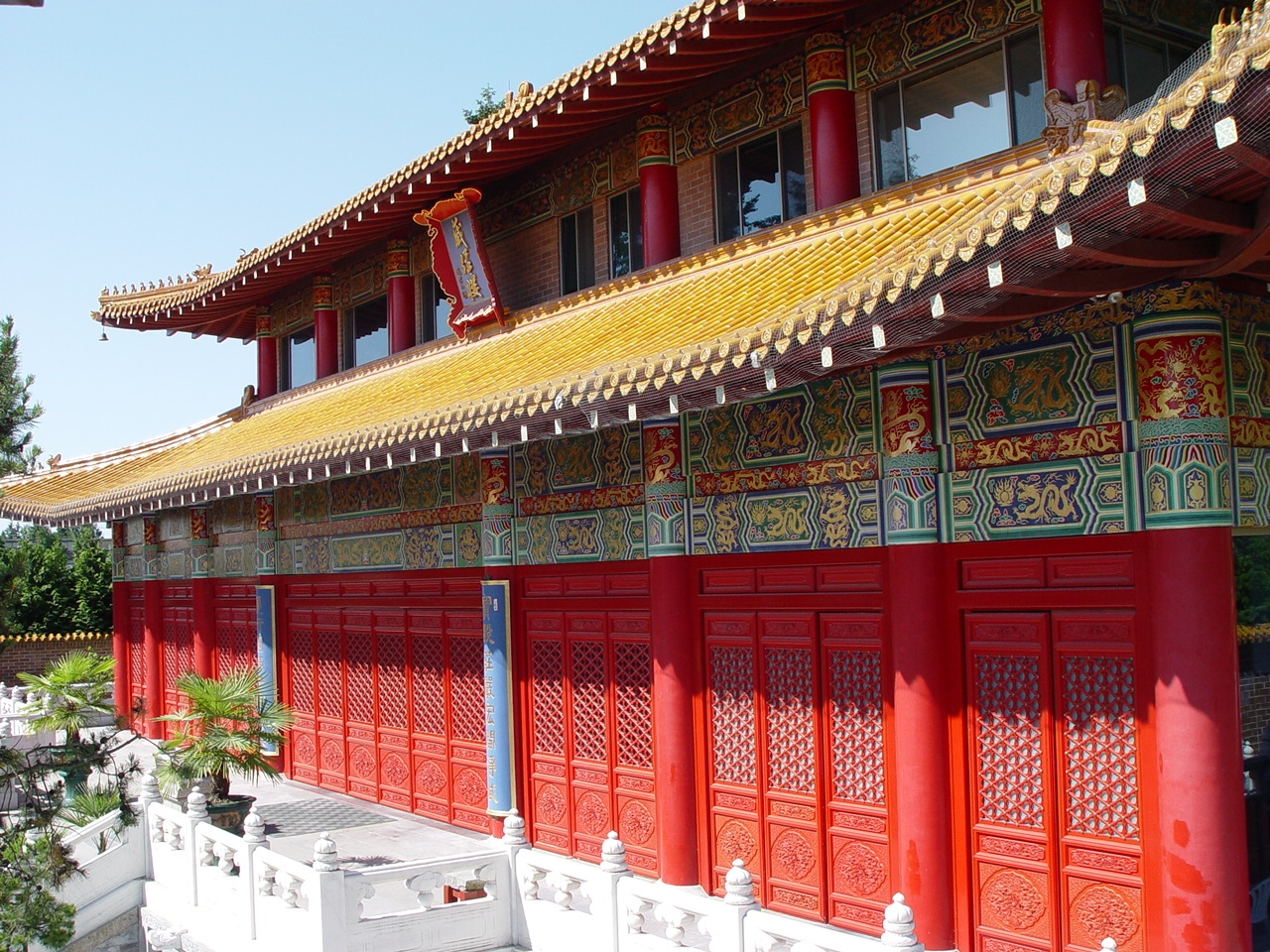
Front of the Meditation Hall

The International Buddhist Society hosts English-language meditation classes every Saturday beginning at 9 a.m. and the temple periodically hosts retreats. Venerable Guan Cheng himself conducts lectures and Dharma Talks regularly in English, Cantonese, and Mandarin. He discusses everything from practical applications of Buddhist wisdom to ancient scriptures in Sanskrit.

Visitors may honour the Buddhas and Bodhisattvas by making contributions to the temple. Avalokitesvara, for example, is the embodiment of Compassion, and helps individuals overcome troubles and acquire health and happiness. General Guan represents loyalty and righteousness. Contributions to him will bring protection from harm, illness, and evil.

The temple offers guided tours for groups of 15 or more. The Sangha holds daily prayer sessions and special ceremonies in the Main Gracious Hall.

== Awards ==
The temple is recognized as the city of Richmond's "Point of Pride". It has also won the 125th Centennial Award from the Lieutenant Governor of Canada, for services to the community.

For over a decade, the temple has been the first-place winner for Richmond's Landscape and Garden Contest, in the "church/temple" category.
