= Chinese head tax (Newfoundland) =

Tax on Chinese immigrants in Newfoundland

The Chinese head tax was a $300 fee placed on Chinese immigrants entering the Dominion of Newfoundland from 1906 to 1949.

== Legislation ==
In the 19th General Assembly, William R. Howley introduced a bill that would have prohibited Chinese immigrants from entering into the country. Howley's bill, however, was defeated in the House of Assembly.

On April 27, 1906, Justice Minister Edward P. Morris presented a petition from the Longshoreman's Protective Union requesting legislation to stop Chinese immigration.

The House of Assembly passed the legislation quickly, however, the Legislative Council deliberated. The Upper House was divided, with some supporting it and others not. Eventually, the Council supported it, but they reduced the original $500 tax to $300.

On August 8, 1906, an Act Respecting the Immigration of Chinese Persons passed through the legislature.

== Tax ==
Originally, the tax was $500; however, after a compromise from the Legislative Council, it was reduced to $300. Approximately 330 Chinese men paid the fee, with women and children actively barred entry to the country. The tax was, at the time, equivalent to a three years' wage. Most borrowed money from family, and spent many years after paying off the debt.

== Apology ==
On June 28, 2006, Premier Danny Williams made a formal apology on behalf of the Government of Newfoundland and Labrador.

== Monument ==
On September 17, 2010, a monument off of St. John's City Hall on New Gower Street was unveiled to commemorate the tax. The monument reads: In 1906, the Government of the Dominion of Newfoundland imposed a $300 (three hundred dollars) head tax on each Chinese immigrant entering the country. This discriminatory legislation remained in effect until 1949. This monument is dedicated to the memory of those Chinese immigrants who travelled from their homeland seeking a better life.
