= Arlene Chan =

Canadian historian, activist, athlete and author

- Born: Arlene Lumb; 1950s Toronto, Ontario, Canada
- Education: University of Toronto Bachelors, Masters
- Occupations: Historian, Author, Activist, Athlete, Librarian
- Employer: Toronto Public Library (retired)
- Known for: Community leadership in Toronto's Chinatown; Author and historian in Chinese Canadian culture; Dragon Boat racing athlete and promoter
- Spouse: Leo J. K. Chan
- Parent(s): Doyle Lumb, Jean Lumb
- Relatives: Janet Lumb, Ken Lumb, +3 siblings
- Awards: 2012 Queen’s Diamond Jubilee Award; 2017 Heritage Toronto Special Achievement Award; 2018 Women of Achievement Award
- Website: https://www.arlenechan.ca

Arlene Chan (née Lumb) is a Chinese Canadian historian, activist, athlete, and author from Toronto, Ontario, Canada. Her works focus on documenting the lived experiences and histories of Toronto's Chinese community, as well as the cultural celebrations and traditions important to the Chinese Canadian diaspora. As a prominent member in the community, Chan serves as an advisor for the Chinese Canadian Museum and the Toronto Public Library's Chinese Canadian Archive, among other organizations. She is the president of the Jean Lumb Foundation.

Chan also represented Canada athletically as a member of the Outer Harbour Dragon Boat Club and the Canadian National Women's Dragon Boat Team, winning multiple gold and bronze medals at international championships.

== Early life ==
Chan was one of six children born to Doyle and Jean B. Lumb who ran the successful Kwong Chow restaurant located at Elizabeth and Dundas Street in Toronto's first Chinatown. Growing up in the centre of Toronto's Chinese community with her socially and politically active family, she witnessed the activism and organization within the community, from their rights advocacy initiatives to efforts to save Toronto's Chinatown. From these formative experiences, Chan became interested early-on in the history of Chinese Canadians, and from a young age collected print and documents to record the history of the community.

== Professional life ==
Arlene Chan studied at the University of Toronto and graduated with a bachelor's degree in English and psychology. She subsequently completed her master's degree at the same university in the library sciences. She is an alumna of the international sorority organization Tri Delta, joining the sorority after attending an event there as guest speaker.

After her education, Chan began her professional career as a librarian with the North York Board of Education and continued to work for 30 years at the Toronto Public Library where she was instrumental in the success of the organization's bookmobile and at-home services.

== Works ==
Chan's writing career began in 1997 with her book Spirit of the Dragon: the Story of Jean Lumb, a Proud Chinese Canadian. The book tells the story of her mother, Jean Lumb, the first Chinese Canadian to receive the Order of Canada and her role in changing Canada’s immigration laws and contributions in saving Toronto's First Chinatown. Arlene Chan would go on to complete numerous children's books and research works documenting the history and experiences of Chinese Canadians in Canada and Toronto:

=== Youth books ===
- Awakening the Dragon: the Dragon Boat Festival. 2004
- The Moon Festival: A Chinese Mid-Autumn Celebration. 1999 (shortlisted for the Ontario Silver Birch Award)
- Spirit of the Dragon: the Story of Jean Lumb, a Proud Chinese Canadian. 1997 (Awarded Choice Book by the Canadian Children’s Book)

=== Non-fiction books ===
- Righting Canada's Wrongs: the Chinese Head Tax and Anti-Chinese Immigration Policies in the Twentieth Century. 2014 (nominated for the Red Cedar Award and Heritage Toronto Book Award)
- The Chinese Community in Toronto: Then and Now. 2013
- The Chinese in Toronto from 1878: From Outside to Inside the Circle. 2011 (nominated for the 2012 Heritage Toronto Book Award and 2013 Ontario Speaker’s Award)
- Paddles Up! Dragon Boat Racing in Canada. 2009 (the first book on the sport of dragon boating in Canada)

== Representing Canada in athletics ==
Arlene Chan
Medal record
Women's Dragon boat
Representing Canada
11th World Dragon Boat Racing Championship 2013 Szeged, Hungary
Gold medal – first place	Senior B women	200m
Gold medal – first place	Senior B women	500m
Gold medal – first place	Senior B women	1000m
Gold medal – first place	Senior B women	2000m
10th World Dragon Boat Racing Championship 2011 Tampa, Florida
Gold medal – first place	Senior B women	200m
Gold medal – first place	Senior B women	500m
Gold medal – first place	Senior B women	1000m
Gold medal – first place	Senior B women	2000m
Club Crew World Championships 2010 Macau, China
Bronze medal – third place	Senior women	200m
Bronze medal – third place	Senior women	500m
Bronze medal – third place	Senior women	2000m

Chan entered into dragon boat racing during her background research for Awakening the Dragon. The experience would compel her to go on to compete in multiple international competitions as a member of the Outer Harbour Dragon Boat Club (2010) and the Canadian National Women's Dragon Boat Team (2010-2013), winning multiple gold and bronze medals.

== Awards ==
- 2012 Queen Elizabeth II Diamond Jubilee Award
- 2017 Heritage Toronto Special achievement
- 2018 Tri-Delta Women of Achievement Award

== Community leadership ==
Arlene Chan serves on the boards of various organizations:

- President of the Jean Lumb Foundation
- Board member of Little Pear Garden Dance Company
- Advisor for Myseum of Toronto
- Advisor for Toronto Public Library’s Chinese Canadian Archive
- Member of Ontario Infrastructure Heritage Interpretation Working Group.

She shares the history and her own stories of Toronto’s First and West Chinatown through her writings, her Chinatown tours, and presentations are various organizations and educational institutes.
