= East Chinatown, Toronto =

East Chinatown, Toronto 多倫多東區華埠
- Neighbourhood
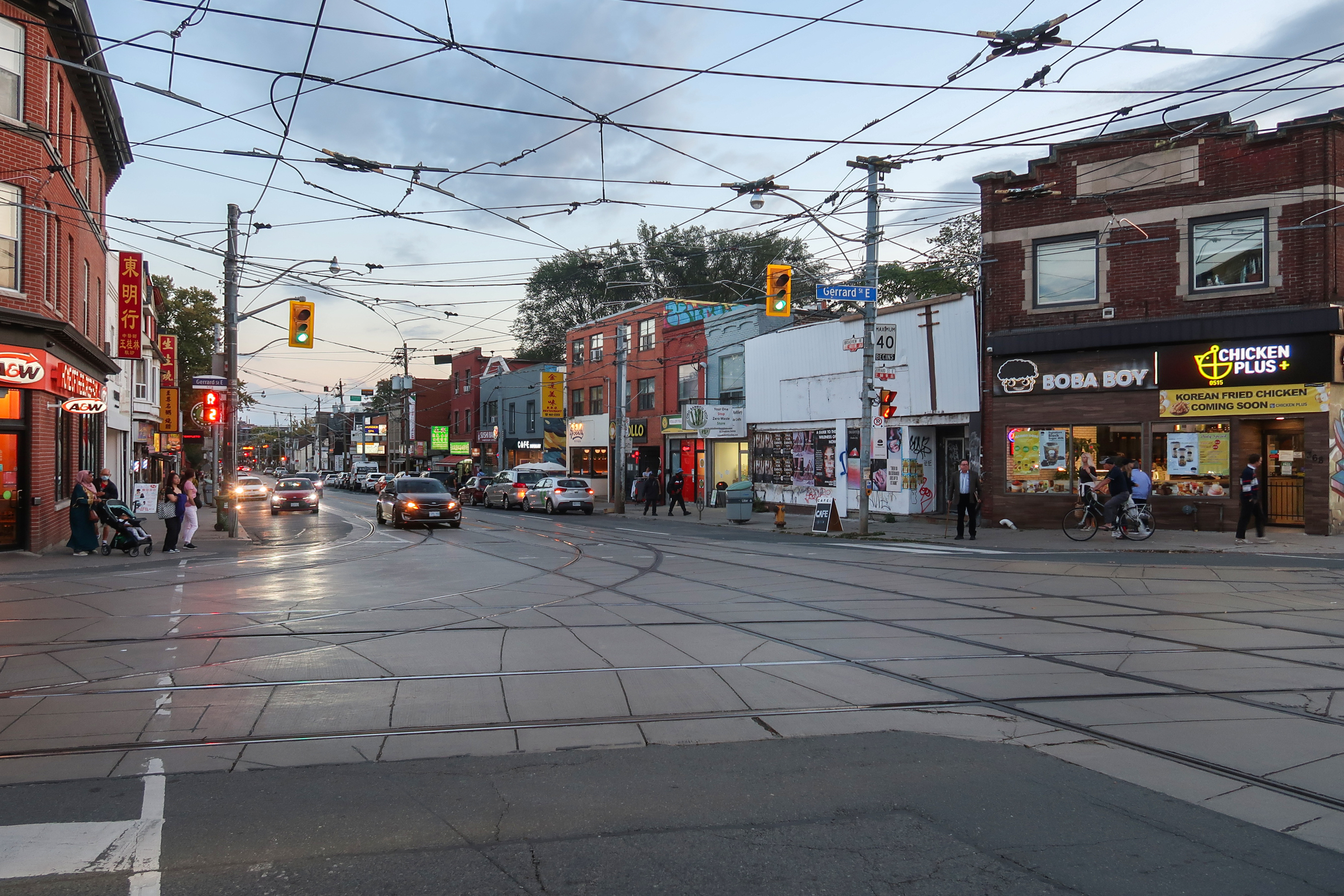
- Chinatown East in Riverdale, centred around Gerrard Street and Broadview Avenue in 2023

- Location within Toronto
- Coordinates: 43.666614°N 79.347295°W
- Country: Canada
- Province: Ontario
- City: Toronto

East Chinatown is a Chinese neighbourhood located in the city of Toronto's east end in Riverdale and one of the several Chinatowns in Toronto. It was formed during the early 1970s and is centred on Gerrard Street East between Broadview Avenue and Carlaw Avenue.

== History ==
With the expropriation of the first downtown Chinatown from the 1950s to 1960s as well as subsequent increase in property values in the Spadina avenue West Chinatown, many Chinese Canadians migrated to Toronto's east end.

The nascent East Chinatown community was formed in the Riverdale neighbourhood around 1971 when Charlie Cheung moved from first Chinatown and purchased a property at 383 Broadview Avenue to start Charlie's Meat, a Chinese butchershop. Other restaurants soon followed with the growth of the community, such as the Pearl Court Restaurant that opened in 1982. Pearl Court became a hub for many of the community's events including many involving Jack Layton, the MP for the area for many years. A street adjoining East Chinatown is dedicated to Layton. Chinese-Vietnamese and mainland Chinese immigrants dominate this neighbourhood.

The East Chinatown community was heavily affected leading up to the 2001 by Toronto's bid for the 2008 Olympics and subsequently by the construction of the "Studio District", in South Riverdale next to the Toronto Port Lands. The land speculation in these construction project drove up property values, which prompted many of business and residents to migrate north to Scarborough, Markham, and Richmond Hill.

As with many Canadian Chinatowns, the demographics of East Chinatown has been changing with gentrification and immigration.

== Neighbourhood features ==
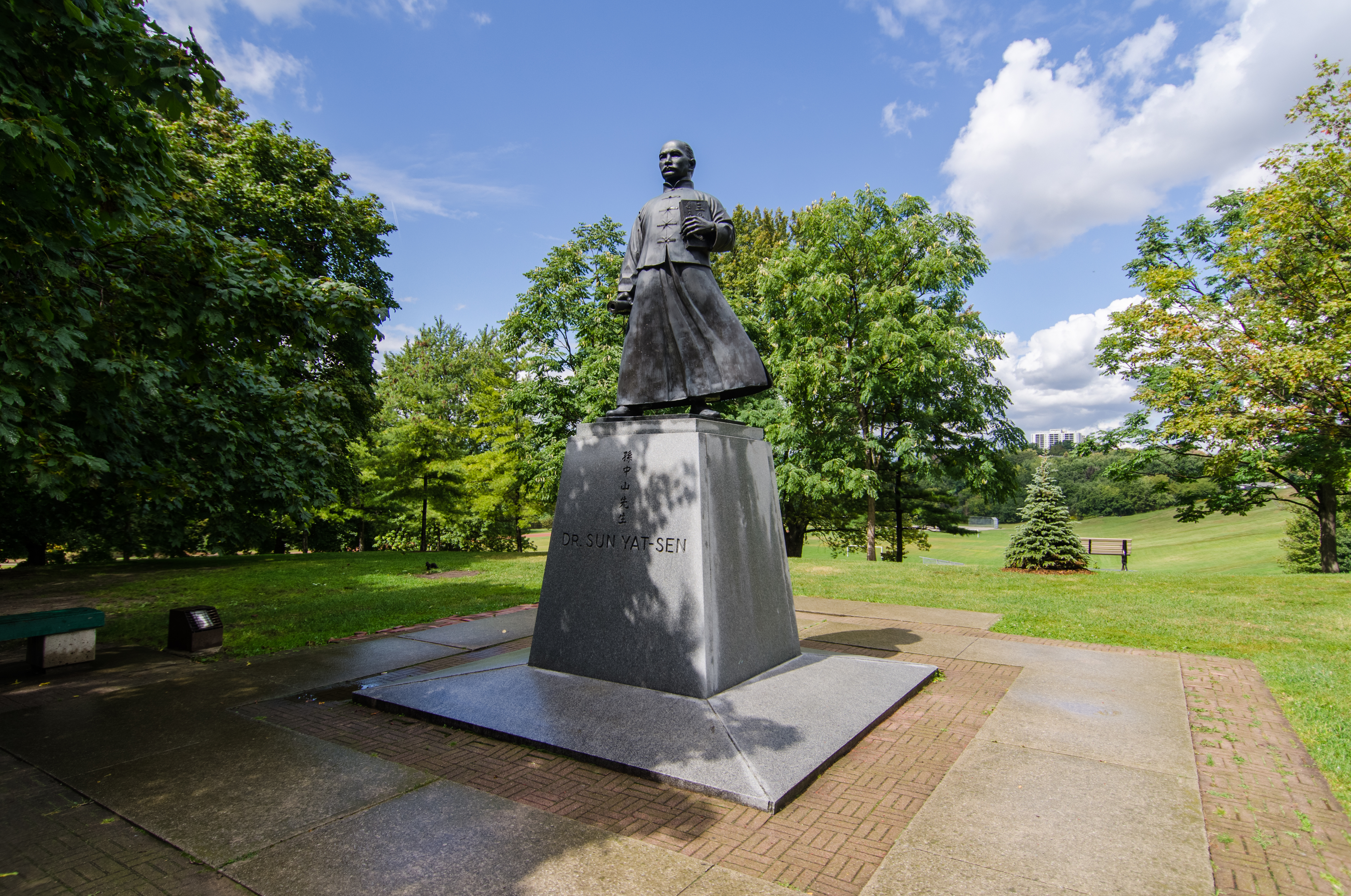
A monument to Dr. Sun Yat-Sen is located in Riverdale Park near East Chinatown.

At the northernmost corner of East Chinatown (northwest corner, Broadview Avenue and Gerrard Street) is the Riverdale branch of the Toronto Public Library. This branch is bilingual in Chinese and English. North of the library in Riverdale Park is a monument to the Chinese revolutionary and first leader of Republican China: Sun Yat-sen. There are two streets with bilingual signs (English on top, Chinese on the bottom) located in the neighbourhood at three of the four corners of the intersections:

- Broadview Avenue (百樂匯街, lit. gathering of a hundred joys)
- Gerrard Street East (芝蘭東街)

The neighbourhood is also the site for the only Chinese Archway (牌坊, páifāng) in Toronto, with its official construction beginning in late 2008 and opening to the public on September 12, 2009. The creation of the archway was due in large part to the efforts of Valerie Mah as a member of the Chinese Chamber of Commerce of East Toronto together with Councillor Paula Fletcher. The archway and parking lot next to where it is located has since won a prestigious international award in 2012 for Best Design/Implementation of a Surface Parking Lot.

Chinatown East can be accessed by the 504 King, the 505 Dundas, or the 506 Carlton Toronto Transit Commission (TTC) streetcars.

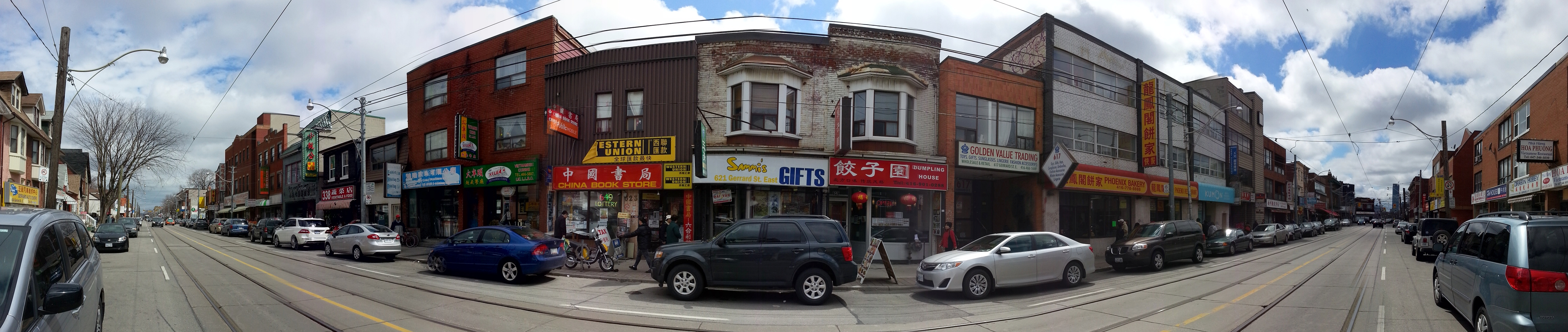
Looking south on Gerrard Street in East Chinatown. The buildings of downtown Toronto can be seen in the distant right.

== Popular culture ==
Bo Ling's Chop Suey Palace in Metro-Goldwyn-Mayer's 1983 film A Christmas Story where the Parker family eat peking duck on Christmas Day was filmed in East Chinatown at 744 Gerrard Street East.

Scenes from the 2013 film The F Word were filmed in East Chinatown near the Broadview Ave. and Gerrard Street East intersection.

== See also ==
- Chinese Canadians
- Chinese Canadians in the Greater Toronto Area
- History of Chinese immigration to Canada
- Chinese head tax in Canada
- Royal Commission on Chinese Immigration (1885)
- Chinese Immigration Act of 1885
- Chinese Immigration Act, 1923
- Chinatowns in Toronto
- Historical Chinatowns in Nanaimo & Chinatown, Victoria
- Chinatown, Vancouver
- List of Chinatowns
