= The Hong Kong Filmography, 1977-1997 =

- Author: John Charles
- Language: English
- Genre: Non-fiction, film
- Publisher: McFarland & Company
- Publication date: November 2000
- Publication place: United States
- Media type: Print
- Pages: 357
- ISBN: 978-0-7864-4323-9

The Hong Kong Filmography, 1977-1997 is a non-fiction book by John Charles. Published by McFarland & Company in November 2000, it catalogues the cast, crew, characters and reviews over 1,100 Hong Kong films released between 1977 and 1997.

Charles grew interested in Hong Kong films after watching them on television and began scouring Chinatowns in Toronto for more films. This led him to write reviews in zines such as Skam and Video Watchdog, with some reviewers from the latter publication being reused in the book.

== Background and content ==
John Charles discovered Hong Kong films through television through a Canadian television program called Black Belt Theater. Becoming interested in the films, he began exploring markets and video stores in the Chinatowns of Toronto where he found bootlegs of films like John Woo's The Killer (1989) and A Chinese Ghost Story (1987). Charles' new passion for these films led to writing for zines such as Skam (later called Cineraider), which he described as "the only publication I knew of at the time that took these films seriously." He also wrote for Video Watchdog, where a number of the reviews in the book originally appeared in.

Most of Charles' reviews in the book consist of three paragraphs. The dates chosen cover the years from the beginning of the Hong Kong New Wave to the Handover of Hong Kong. The book is 357 pages long. The book reviews 1,102 Hong Kong films and a handful of others from Taiwan and mainland China.

For each film listed, information is provided on production and cast, character names, credits, plot synopses, and film availability on VHS, LaserDisc or DVD. In the guide, Charles assigns films a rating from 1 to 10, with Charles suggesting any film rated 6/10 is "probably worth viewing."

== Release and reception ==
The book was first published by McFarland & Company in November 2000. Beifuss wrote that "Like most McFarland books, The Hong Kong Filmography is saddled with a poorly designed and unattractive cover" but said this shouldn't detract interested readers.

Reviewing the book for Senses of Cinema, Steve Erickson wrote that "Apart from the hard-to-find Hong Kong International Film Festival catalogues, this information hasn't been put in one place so conveniently before." Comparing it to David Bordwell's Planet Hong Kong where Bordwell states he has seen 370 films, Charles reviews over 1000. Charles compared it to the zine Asian Cult Cinema (formerly Asian Trash Cinema) had attempted similar tasks but was "marred by factual errors and a sensibility that values cheap thrills above all else." In Film Criticism, Marshall Deutelbaum said that the filmography was not complete, noting missing films such as Ah Ying (1983) or 4 Faces of Eve (1996). Deutelbaum ultimately described it as "A perfect guide for audiences deciding what films to watch beyond the titles mentioned in Bey Logan's Hong Kong Action Cinema and Stefan Hammond's and Mike Wilkins' Sex and Zen and a Bullet in the Head." He complimented the book for its "thoughtful warnings", stating that Charles was fair in his reviews of the films writing how newcomers to films like The Eagle Shooting Heroes (1993) or The Dragon Chronicles – The Maidens (1994) would only be more appealing to more seasoned viewers of Hong Kong films.

In Communication Booknotes Quarterly, John A. Lent said the book would have been enhanced with a lengthy introduction that explained the meaning behind this scope of the "so-called New Wave" and provided discussion on trends and issues in Hong Kong filmmaking. Lent wrote that the low scale of the bibliography of six program guides, two books, three periodicals and six websites was "a disgrace in an otherwise useful volume."
