= Jean B. Lumb =

Canadian activist

Jean Bessie Lumb
- Born: Toy Jin Wong; 30 July 1919; Nanaimo, British Columbia, Canada
- Died: 17 July 2002; Toronto, Ontario, Canada
- Other name: 林黃彩珍
- Occupations: Restaurateur, Activist, Spokesperson, Community Worker
- Known for: Saving Toronto's Chinatown; Lobbying change for discriminatory immigration laws.; Advocate for the Chinese Canadian community.
- Spouse: Doyle Lumb (m.1939-1989)
- Children: Arlene Chan, Janet Lumb, Ken Lumb, +3
- Awards: 1976 Order of Canada; 1977 Queen’s Silver Jubilee Award; 1977 Recipient of the Governor General’s Award; 2002 Queen’s Golden Jubilee Award

Jean Bessie Lumb, CM, née Wong (1919–2002) was the first Chinese Canadian woman and the first restaurateur to receive the Order of Canada for her community work. Most notably, she was recognized for her pivotal role in changing Canada’s immigration laws that separated Chinese families and for her contribution in saving Toronto's First Chinatown and Chinatowns in other cities.

== Early life ==
Lumb, one of twelve children, was born in Nanaimo, British Columbia to Fun Gee Wong and Hone Hung Mah, both of Canton, China. Her father emigrated to Canada to work as a farm labourer. Lumb left school at the age of 12 to work and support her family. In 1935, she moved to Toronto and later opened her own grocery store as a 17-year-old.

== Adulthood ==
Jean Lumb married Doyle Jenning Lumb in 1939 in Toronto, who had come to Canada from China, and they had 6 children. Although Lumb was born in Canada she lost her Canadian status after her marriage and regained it in 1947. Her husband was born in China and remained stateless until 1947 and died in 1989.

The mother of six children and grandmother of nine grandchildren, Jean Lumb was the co-owner (with husband Doyle Lumb) and director of the Kwong Chow Restaurant in Toronto for 23 years. The restaurant was highly successful and popular with both Chinese and Westerners, with many politicians a clientele due to its proximity to Toronto's city hall.

Lumb was very active in community work throughout her life. She was instrumental in organizing the campaign to save Toronto's First Chinatown from complete demolition and galvanized the community against further expropriation later of remaining portions on Dundas Street. She was also a major force, and the sole woman, in the 1957 delegation from the Chinese community lobbying the government of John Diefenbaker to repeal the explicit racial discrimination from the immigration laws of the time containing race-based criteria for admission to Canada.

She achieved many firsts in Toronto. This included being the:

- First Chinese woman on the board of governors of the Women’s College Hospital.
- First Chinese woman on the board of University Settlement House
- First Chinese restaurateur and first woman to receive the Fran Deck Award for outstanding achievement in Toronto’s restaurant industry.
- First Chinese-Canadian woman to sit on the board of Rotary-Laughlen Centre.

She also served as director and honorary advisor of the Yee Hong Chinese Nursing Home for Greater Toronto and the Chinese Cultural Centre of Greater Toronto, respectively.

=== Positions ===
- 1957: Immigration Appeal Act (Only woman invited to Ottawa to represent Chinese families separated by immigration laws)
- 1950 - 1972: Women's Association of the Chinese Dramatic Society, president and director
- 1959 - 1981: Kwong Chow Chop Suey House, Toronto, co-owner and director
- 1959 - 1970: Chinese Community Dancers of Ontario, director and producer (Command Performance for and presentation to Her Majesty, Queen Elizabeth II, Ottawa, 1967
- 1959 - 1967: Toronto Chinese Public School, trustee and director
- 1962 - 1968: University Settlement House (First Chinese-Canadian woman to sit on the board of directors)
- 1963 - 1998: Lem Si Ho Tong Family Association Women's Group, president and director
- 1966 - 1982: Rotary-Laughlen Centre (First Chinese-Canadian woman to sit on the board)
- 1970 - 1982: Women's College Hospital (First Chinese-Canadian woman to sit on the board of Governors)
- 1970: "Save Chinatown" Campaign, chairperson
- 1973 - 1982: Ontario Advisory Council on Multiculturalism
- 1985 - 1999: Mount Sinai Hospital, director
- 1985 - 1998: University Settlement House, patron
- 1986 - 1990: Canadian Music Competition for Ontario, patron
- 1987 - 1990: Summer Centres for Seniors, director
- 1992: Twinning of Chung King and Toronto, advisory board member
- 1994: Ontario Women's Directorate, honorary member
- 1994 - 2001: Citizenship Judge
- 1994 Yee Hong Chinese Nursing Home for Greater Toronto, founding director
- 1994 Chinese Cultural Centre of Greater Toronto, honorary advisor

== Family ==
Lumb's brothers Robert (1917-1987) and Tommy Wong also moved to Toronto, where they founded Central Airways School (formerly Wong's Air School), that taught flying at Toronto Island Airport. Their flying school closed down in the early 1980s. Robert lived in east end Toronto and Tommy in west-end Toronto. Lumb's daughter, Arlene Chan, is a prolific author and a historian of Toronto's Chinatowns and the Chinese Canadian community.

== Awards and honours ==
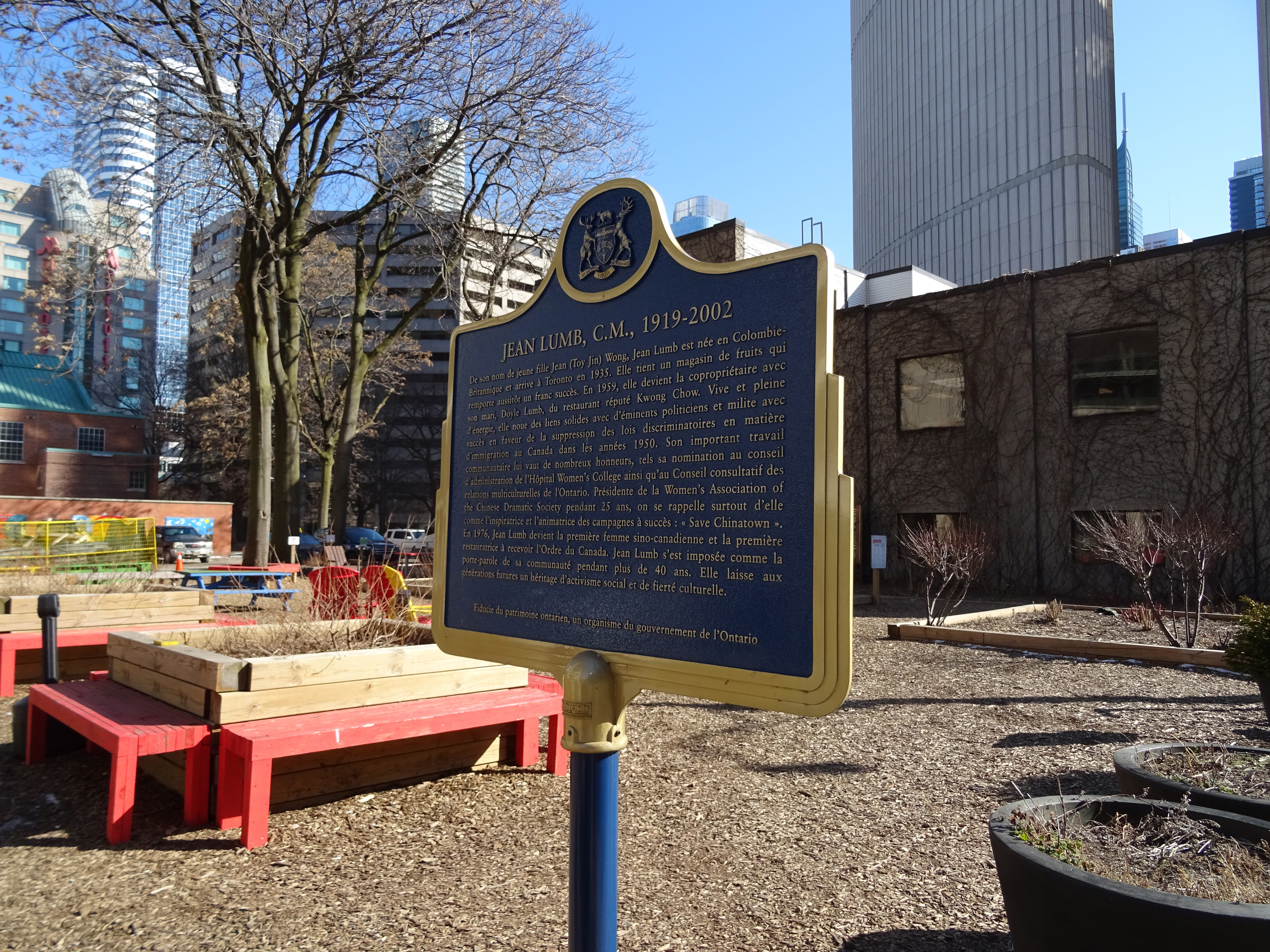
Plaque in the Diversity Garden located in the former First Chinatown of Toronto describing the achievements of Jean B. Lumb.

- 1976: Order of Canada (First Chinese-Canadian woman and First Canadian restaurateur)
- 1977: Queen’s Silver Jubilee Award
- 1977: Recipient of the Governor General’s Award
- 1982: The Fran Deck Award In recognition of Toronto’s leading contributor to the restaurant industry (First woman recipient)
- 1983: Special Award to Honour Special Chinese Canadians (Presented by the Chinese Canadian National Council in honour of Chinese in Canada and their 125 years of continuous community)
- 1984: Recipient of the City of Toronto Award of Merit, Special Sesquicentennial presentation on Civic Honours Day First Chinese-Canadian woman
- 1984: Award, Ontario Chinese Restaurant Association
- 1990: The Chinese Community Nursing Home for Greater Toronto, Tribute at the first annual Dragon Ball
- 1994: YWCA Women of Change Honour Roll
- 1996: Tribute to Madam Jean Lumb Banquet: Mid-Autumn Gala for the Jean Lumb Awards
- 1997: Elizabeth Fry Society, Rebel for a Cause Honouree
- 1997: Chinese Family and Health Cooperative, Mother of the Year Award
- 2000: Order of the Knights of Rizal
- 2002: Queen’s Golden Jubilee Award
- 2007: Association of Chinese Canadian Entrepreneurs, Lifetime Achievement Award
- 2009: Provincial Historical Plaque Unveiling, Ontario Heritage Trust
- 2017: TDSB Jean Lumb Public School

== Media ==
=== Filmography ===
- Jean Lumb, Loving spoonfuls, Episode 2, Indivisual Productions Inc., 2001.
- Quo Vadis, Mrs. Lumb?, National Film Board of Canada, 1965.
- Spirit of the dragon, written, directed and produced by Gil Gauvreau, Convergence Productions, 2002. (Winner of the National Film Board of Canada's Outstanding Documentary Award at the Reel World Festival 2003)
- Under the willow tree: pioneer Chinese women in Canada, National Film Board of Canada, 1997.

=== Exhibition ===
"But women did come: a photographic exhibition on Chinese Canadian women", Chinese Canadian National Council, 1993.
