= First Chinatown, Toronto =

First Chinatown, Toronto 多倫多舊中區華埠
- Former neighbourhood
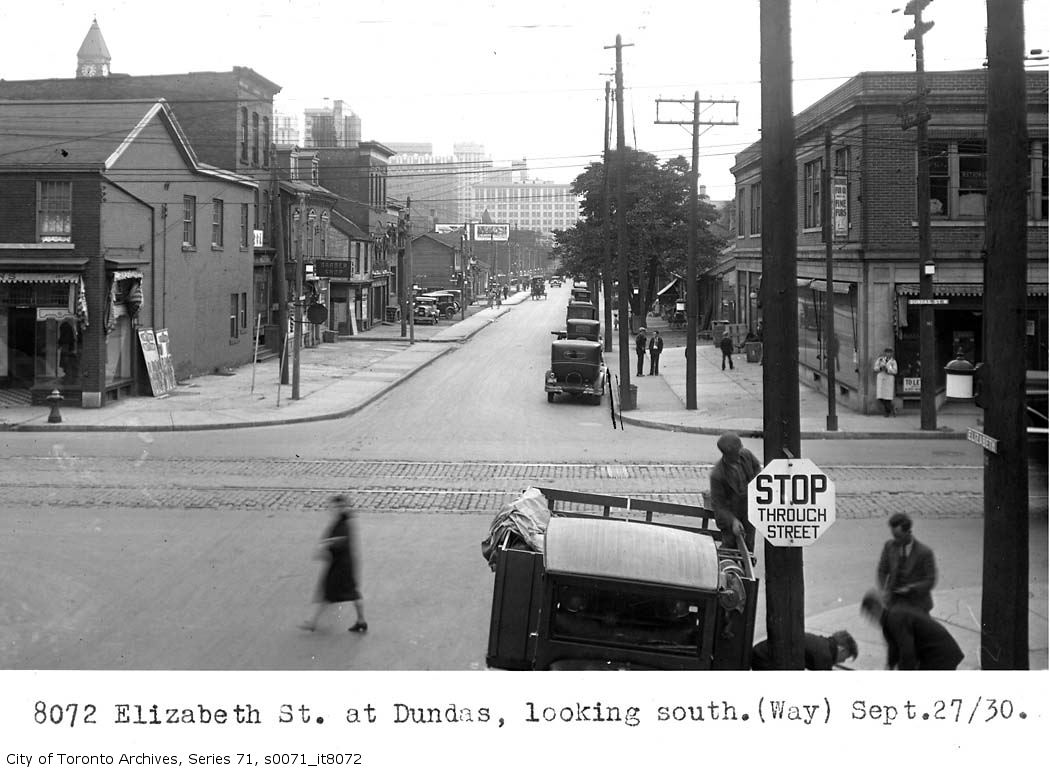
- The first Chinatown went along Elizabeth and York Street, between Dundas and Queen Street.
- Interactive map of First Chinatown, Toronto 多倫多舊中區華埠
- Country: Canada
- Province: Ontario
- City: Toronto

First Chinatown is a retronym for a former neighbourhood in Toronto, an area that once served as the city's Chinatown. The city's original Chinatown existed from the 1890s to the 1970s, along York Street and Elizabeth Street between Queen and Dundas Streets within St. John's Ward (commonly known as The Ward). However, more than two thirds of it was expropriated and razed starting in the late 1950s to build the new Toronto City Hall and its civic square, Nathan Phillips Square.

The remainder of Toronto's First Chinatown still exists as one of Toronto's Chinatowns, with numerous Chinese restaurants, north of Hagerman and Armoury streets and around Dundas Street between Bay Street and University Avenue, albeit much reduced and the neighbourhood is now being better known as Japantown, Little Japan, and Little Tokyo. The economic and cultural centre of the downtown Chinese community has largely shifted to the newer West Chinatown located at Spadina and Dundas Street West.

== History ==
=== Beginnings ===
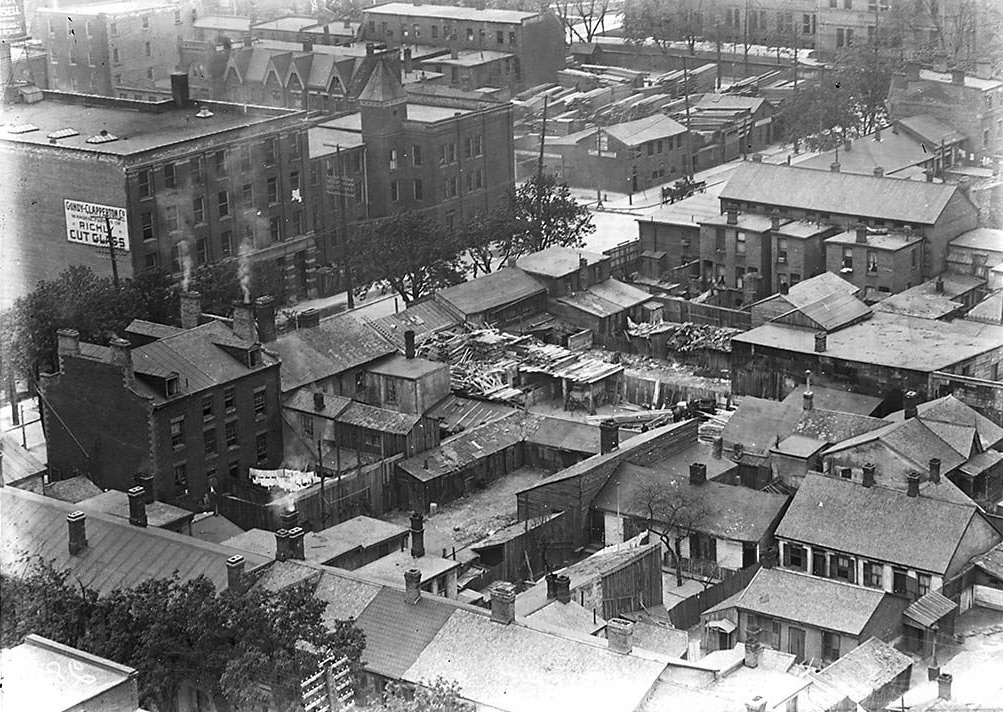
The Ward, c. 1910. Toronto's first Chinatown was situated in The Ward, an area that attracted new immigrants to the city.

The Chinese population in Toronto was sparse and located in much of the Toronto Financial District in the 1800s. The earliest record of Toronto's Chinese community is traced to Sam Ching, who owned a hand laundry business on Adelaide Street in 1878. Ching was the first Chinese person listed in the city's directory and is now honoured with a lane named after him.

The first Chinese café (the term referred to Chinese-owned establishments that served a combination of western and Chinese food) in Toronto was opened in 1901 at 37 1/2 Queen Street West opposite City Hall.

Despite the strict limitations placed on Chinese immigration with the Chinese Immigration Act of 1885, the first Toronto Chinatown took shape in the early 1900s as hundreds of Chinese men settled close to Union Station after helping to build the Canadian Pacific Railway across Canada. The men originally found lodgings close to the railway station due to its convenience.

At that time, the Chinese in Toronto separated themselves into those that supported political reform of the Qing Empire under Empress Dowager Cixi and those that supported a revolution overthrowing the Manchu Qing dynasty. The 1909 Toronto city directory showed them as two distinct clusters of Chinese shops located at:

1. Queen Street East and George Street, adjacent to the reformist Chinese Empire Reform Association (保皇會)
2. Queen Street West and York Street, adjacent to the Chee Kung Tong (致公堂) a Chinese secret fraternal organization supporting the Chinese revolutionary Sun Yat-Sen.

When the Qing dynasty fell in 1912 the reform association became defunct and the business next to it move away from the Queen Street East neighbourhood. Meanwhile, the Chinese community in Queen Street West and York Street continued to grow and moved into the adjacent properties within Toronto's Ward district (43.654°N 79.385°W) vacated by the Jewish population.

By 1910, the Chinese population in Toronto numbered over a thousand. As in the rest of Canada and the US, due to entry resistance into other areas of employment, the Chinese of Toronto had to resort to the labor of food service and washing laundry. In this time, hundreds of Chinese-owned businesses had developed, consisting mainly of restaurants, grocery stores, and hand laundries. The Chinese laundries competed with the other Torontonian laundries leading to publicly called boycotts and demands for the city government to cancel or withhold business licenses from Chinese operators.

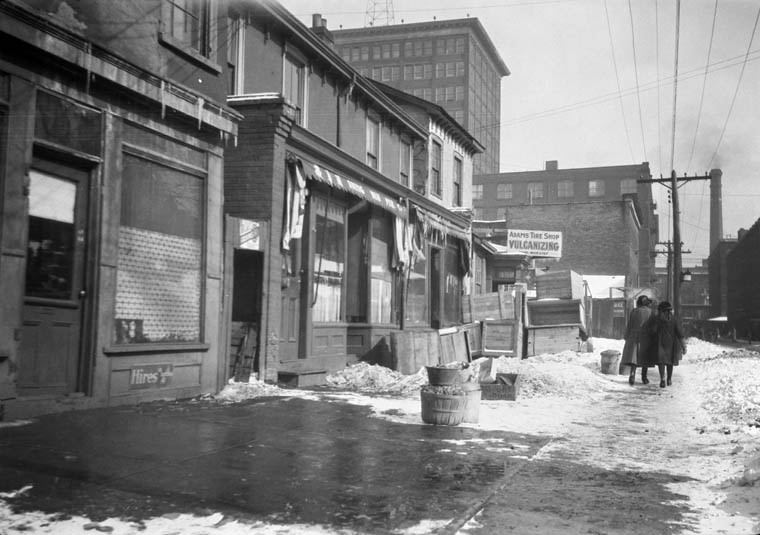
Chinatown printers on Louisa Street. Now part of Toronto's City Hall.

=== Growth ===
By 1912, there were 19 Chinese restaurants, half of which were in The Ward. By the early 1920s, this figure had risen to around 100 cafés and restaurants.

The growth of Chinatown prompted a moral panic among moral reformers and xenophobes who warned of the "lure of the Chinaman" and accused Chinese businesses of being dens of iniquity linked with opium and "white slavery" and of being a danger to the community and, in particular, to white women. As a result, in 1908 the city threatened to deny licenses to Chinese restaurants that employed white women and in 1914 the provincial government introduced legislation barring white women from working in Chinese restaurants. The legislation was not well enforced and by 1923 there were 121 white women recorded as being in the employ of 121 Chinese restaurants in Toronto.

The Toronto Police regularly raided Chinese restaurants for alleged alcohol and gambling offenses, particularly after the passage of the Canada Temperance Act in 1916.

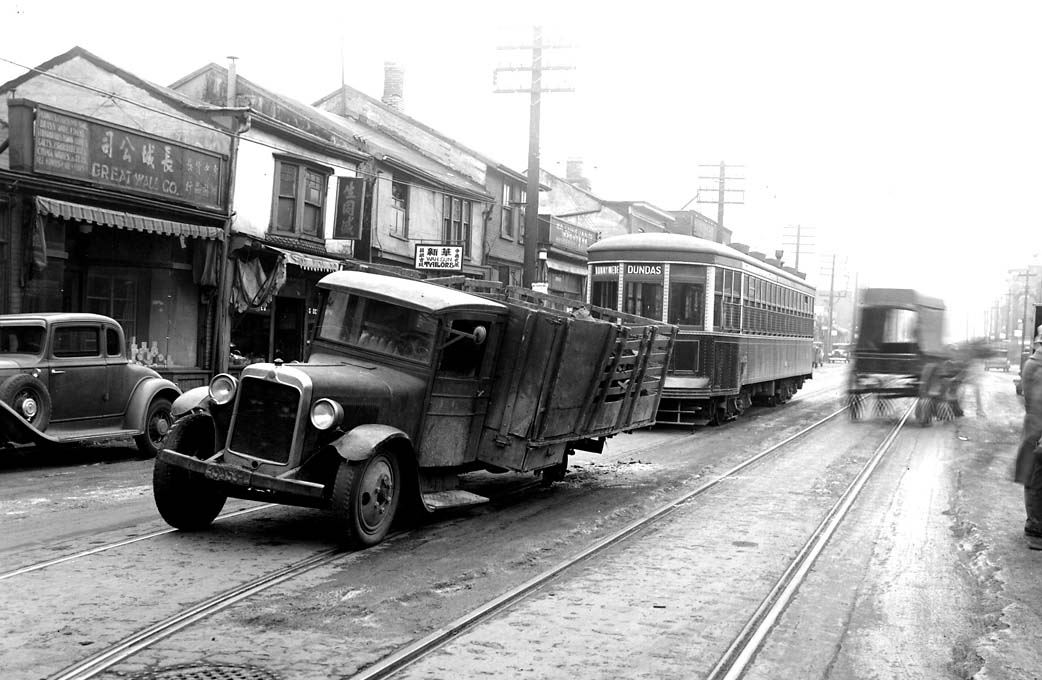
View of Chinatown south of Dundas Street, on Elizabeth Street, c. 1934.

By the 1930s, Chinatown was a firmly established and well-defined community that extended along Bay Street between Dundas Street and Queen Street West. Like the rest of the country, Chinatown suffered a severe downturn in the Great Depression, with the closing of more than 116 hand laundries and hundreds of other businesses.

Many Chinese restaurants in the area fell into disrepair in the 1940s, however the community began to recover after World War II as Canada's general economic fortunes improved and Elizabeth Street experienced a restaurant boom in the late 1940s and 1950 with new, large facilities such as the Nanking opening in 1947, and Lichee Garden Restaurant and Club opening in 1948. Both establishments catered to a largely western clientele with the Lichee Garden being able to accommodate 1,500 customers a day and offering dining and dancing with a live band and a closing time of 5 a.m. Other large restaurants such as the Kwong Chow, the Golden Dragon, and Sai Woo opened in the 1950s with millions of dollars being spent by Chinese investors on improvements to Elizabeth Street.

=== Expropriation ===
Regardless of the investment by its owners and the success of the area with customers, plans emerged in the late 1950s to construct the new Toronto City Hall at the northwestern corner of the intersection of Queen and Bay Streets, it became clear that most of Chinatown would be displaced by the project. As Chinese businesses began to relocate west down Dundas and up Spadina Avenue around Kensington Market, some stores were taken over by other developers, and most stores that occupied the project site were cleared through expropriation. More than two-thirds of Elizabeth Street from Queen to Dundas Streets were destroyed. Construction on Toronto City Hall and Nathan Phillips Square began in 1961.

Due in part to the high land value in the area of Chinatown, city planners in 1967 proposed that the rest of the first Chinatown be demolished and the population moved for the development of office buildings north of City Hall. This endangered many more local businesses, and even with the support of most Torontonians to save this part of Chinatown, the city was adamant to clear the buildings arguing that preserving Chinatown would turn it into a ghetto. At this time, community leaders including Jean Lumb established the "Save Chinatown Committee", with Lumb acting as coordinator and face of the campaign. She later received the Order of Canada in 1976 for her role in helping to save Chinatown.

In 1970 and again in 1975, city officials proposed to demolish the Dundas Street portions of Chinatown for the expansion of the street to six lanes, however, due to community protests, the proposals were quashed.

=== Transformation into Little Tokyo ===
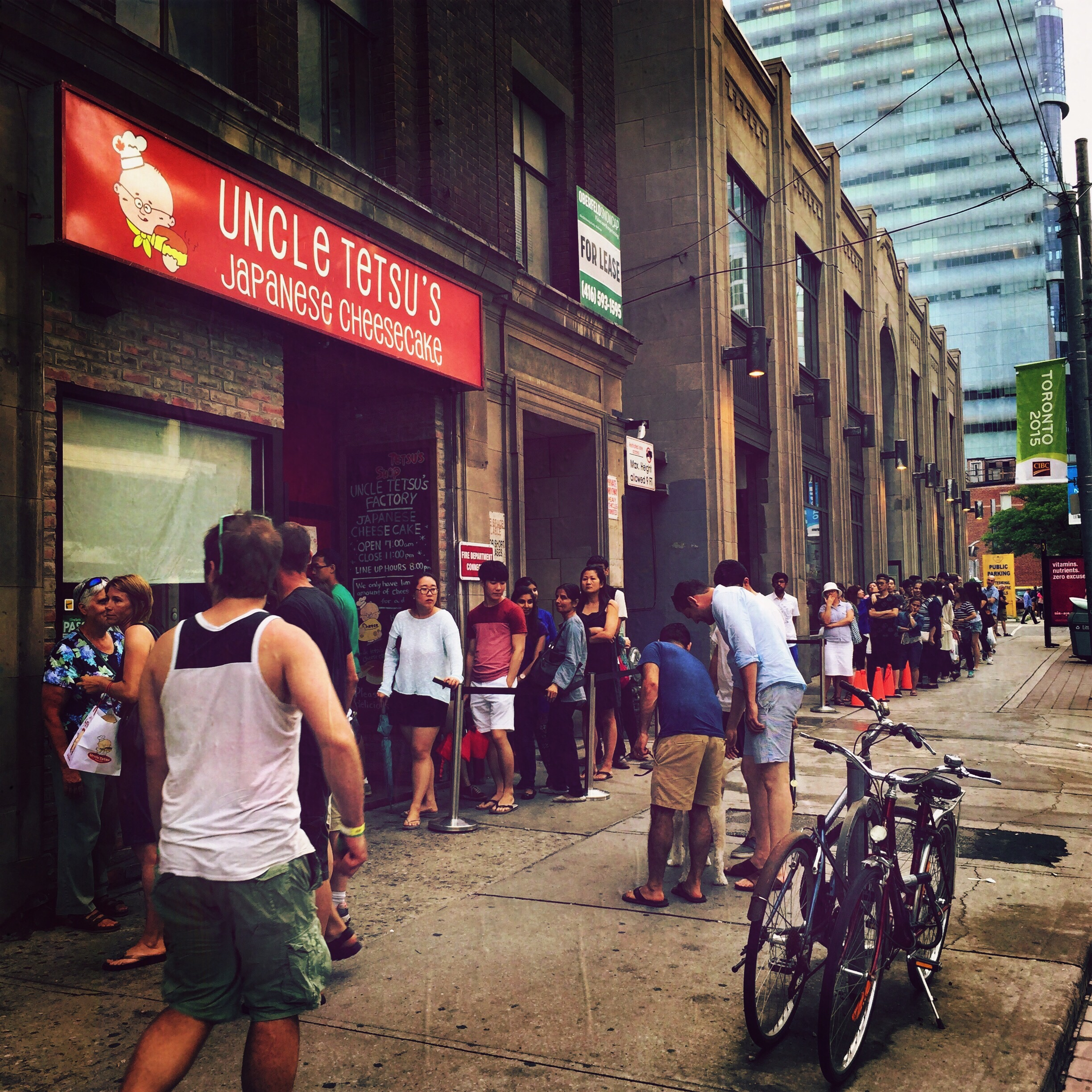
Uncle Tetsu's Cheesecake on Bay Street north of Dundas Street; this location has since moved across the street to Atrium on Bay

Since the mid-2010s, the section of Dundas between Yonge and Chestnut Streets has gradually developed into a Japantown district, although a few Chinese and Korean establishments remain. Fukuoka-based bakery chain Uncle Tetsu's Cheesecake is cited to be the catalyst to attracting other Japanese businesses to the area, most of which consist of restaurants and cafes featuring various types of Japanese cuisine. A Japanese Language School, Aitas, and the minimalist lifestyle store Muji have also established themselves in the area. Of note is the「警察局」(lit. “police station” in Japanese Kanji or Traditional Chinese) label traditionally displayed on the nearby 52nd Division Toronto Police Station, located at the Dundas and Simcoe junction, the midpoint between Little Tokyo and Chinatown West.

== See also ==
- Chinese Canadians
- Chinese Canadians in the Greater Toronto Area
- Chinese head tax in Canada
- Chinese Immigration Act, 1923
- East Chinatown, Toronto
- History of Chinese immigration to Canada
- Japanese Canadians in the Greater Toronto Area
- Royal Commission on Chinese Immigration (1885)
