= Gerrard Street (Toronto) =

Thoroughfare in Toronto, Ontario

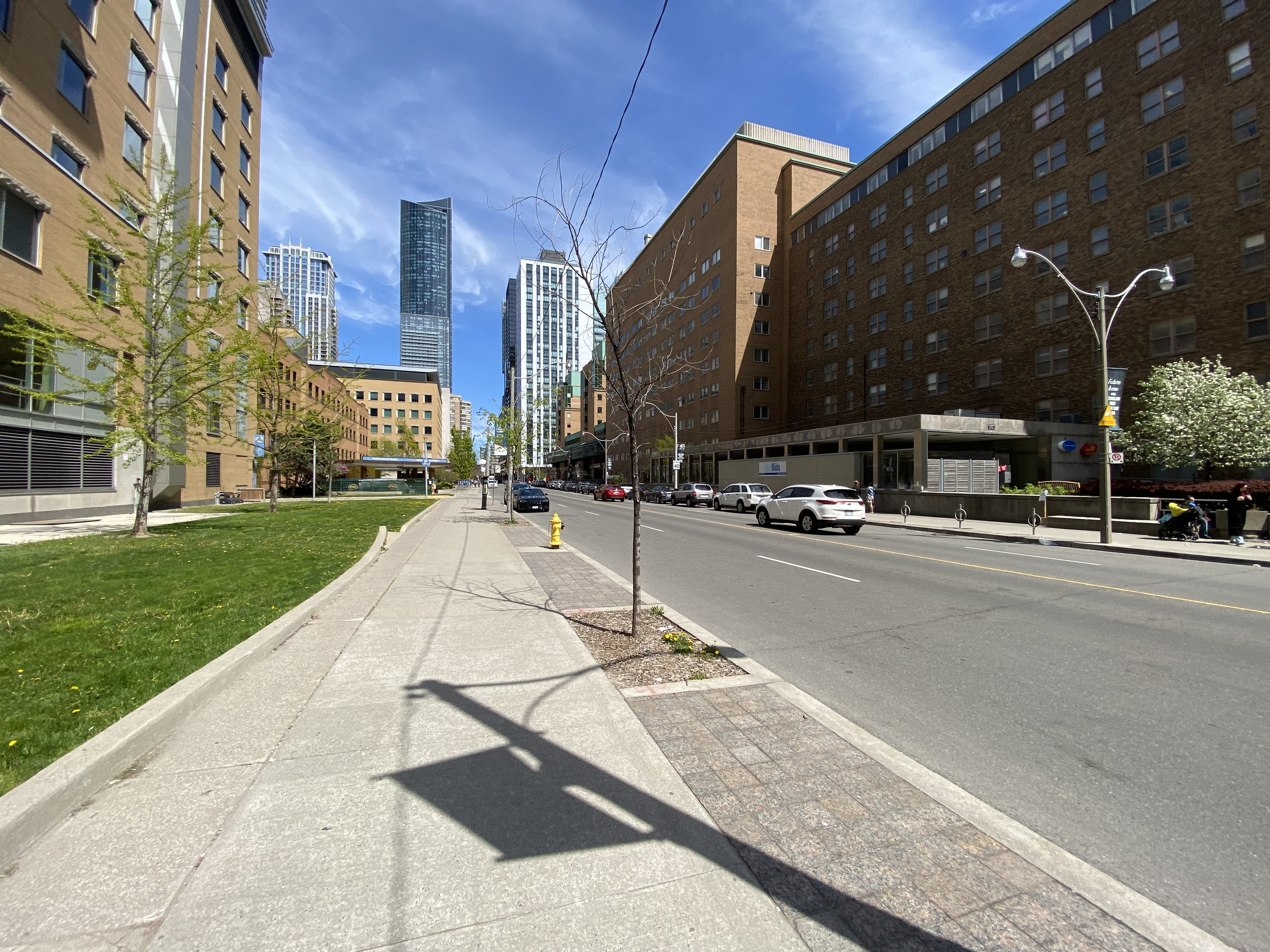
- Gerrard Street near Toronto General Hospital

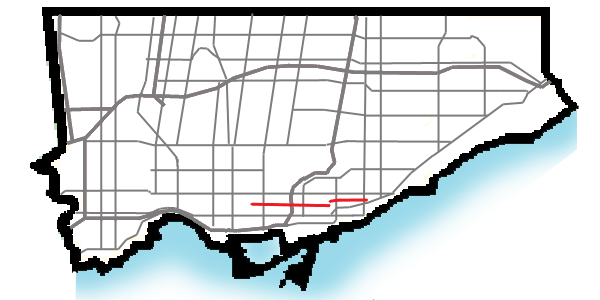
- Maintained by: City of Toronto government
- Length: 9.7 km (6.0 mi)
- Location: Toronto
- West end: University Avenue
- Major junctions: Yonge Street; Jarvis Street; Broadview Avenue; Coxwell Avenue; Woodbine Avenue; Victoria Park Avenue
- East end: Clonmore Drive

Other
Nearby arterial roads in Toronto
| ← Dundas Street | Danforth Avenue → |

Gerrard Street is a street in Toronto, Ontario, Canada. It consists of two separate parts, historically referred to as Lower Gerrard and Upper Gerrard. The former stretches between University Avenue and Coxwell Avenue for 6 km, across Old Toronto. The latter portion starts 300 m north of Lower Gerrard's eastern terminus and runs between Coxwell Avenue and Clonmore Drive, between Victoria Park Avenue and Warden Avenue, in Scarborough for another 4 km.

Gerrard Street travels through a few important districts and neighbourhoods of Toronto, most notably Discovery District, East Chinatown, and Gerrard India Bazaar, Toronto's prime South Asian ethnic enclave.

== History ==
Gerrard is named for Samuel Gerrard (1767–1857), an Anglo-Irish businessman in Lower Canada and a personal friend of the Honourable John McGill, member of the Legislative Council of Upper Canada.

Upper Gerrard was originally a separate street called "Lake View Avenue", which was in the town of East Toronto. The name was changed after East Toronto was annexed by Toronto in 1908.

== Gerrard Village ==
A short stretch of Gerrard Street West from Bay Street to LaPlante Avenue was referred to as Gerrard Village, a bohemian-Greenwich Village like area emerged in late 19th Century to 1920s and disappeared towards the end of the 1960s. A few buildings from the former neighbourhood still exists, but the residents and remaining business no longer hold ties to the past.

People who lived or are associated to it included famous writers, artists:

- Pierre Berton - Canadian historian and author
- Ernest Hemingway - American novelist and reporter lived here during his time in Toronto around 1919–1920
- Lawren Harris - Canadian painter and member of the Group of Seven
- Albert Franck - Dutch-born Canadian painter

== Route description ==
As is typical in Toronto, the street is divided into East and West addresses at Yonge Street. Atypically, the West portion of the street is very short — only four blocks long. Its western terminus at University Avenue lies within the heart of Downtown Toronto's "Hospital Row", which consists of Toronto General Hospital, Mount Sinai Hospital, Princess Margaret Cancer Centre, Toronto Rehab, and The Hospital for Sick Children. The bulk of Gerrard Street is actually known as Gerrard Street East. Toronto Metropolitan University is located on Gerrard Street East just east of Yonge Street. Further to the east, at Parliament Street, Gerrard Street separates Cabbagetown from Regent Park.

After crossing over the Don River, Gerrard Street East passes through Toronto's East Chinatown which is centred on Gerrard between Broadview Avenue and Carlaw Avenue. Continuing east, Gerrard Street East between Greenwood Avenue and Coxwell Avenue is home to one of the largest South Asian marketplaces in North America. At the intersection of Gerrard and Broadview Avenue are two bilingual street signs with the words "Gerrard St E / 芝蘭東街".

Upper Gerrard is largely a mix of residential and small neighbourhood businesses. At Victoria Park Avenue, the name of the street reverts simply to "Gerrard Street", rather than "Gerrard Street East", for the last four blocks before it ends by merging into Clonmore Drive. This nomenclature oddity is due to the area east of Victoria Park formerly being in Scarborough, which did not label the streets entering from Toronto with an "east" designation, even after the creation of Metropolitan Toronto, which used unified cardinal directions for streets elsewhere, including farther north in Scarborough itself for streets continuing from East York and North York. (Gerrard and Queen were the only streets labelled with an "east" designation that entered directly into Scarborough from Toronto; both only continue for a few blocks into Scarborough before ending.)

== Transit ==
The Toronto Transit Commission (TTC) serves Lower Gerrard with the Toronto streetcar route 506 Carlton, between Parliament Street and Coxwell Avenue. The route then travels along Coxwell Avenue and continues along Upper Gerrard until Main Street, where it turns and terminates at Main Street station. The remainder of Gerrard Street, east of Main Street, is served by the TTC bus route 135 Gerrard, which travels between Main Street station and Warden station.

== Gerrard Street Bridge ==
Gerrard Street Bridge
- Coordinates: 43°39′52″N 79°21′24″W
- Carries: 4 lanes vehicular traffic including double streetcar tracks and pedestrian sidewalk on north and south sides
- Crosses: Don River
- Maintained by: Toronto Transportation Services, Toronto Transit Commission

Characteristics
- Material: Steel and concrete
- Total length: ~430 feet (130 m)
- No. of spans: 1
- Clearance below: Don River and Don Valley Parkway

History
- Construction start: 1922
- Construction end: 1923
- Opened: 1923

Location
- Interactive map of Gerrard Street Bridge

A 430 feet (130 m) three-hinged ribbed deck steel arch bridge spans the Don River and (formerly railway tracks and now) the Don Valley Parkway below and was completed in 1923.

This single span replaced the previous bridge which consisted of a Warren pony truss span in the middle connected by a shorter riveted Warren deck truss spans to the east and west sides. Decorative steel railing has been replaced with concrete parapet with simple metal railings in 1991.

== See also ==
- List of neighbourhoods in Toronto
