= Chinese Canadian National Council =

Organization monitoring discrimination against Chinese Canadians

Chinese Canadian National Council (CCNC)
- Predecessor: Chinese Canadian National Council (CCNC)
- Formation: 1980; 46 years ago
- Purpose: Equity and justice
- Key people: CCNC-TO: Directors: Gu Ping, Dominic Chung, Jing Zhang, Jia Chen, Beixi Liu, and Philbert Lui; Co-Chairs: Celia Huang and Calvin To; Treasurer: Rick Xu; Board Secretary: Cassandra Ma CCNC-SJ: Amy Go, President; Directors: Susan Eng, Gary Yee, Dr. Joseph Wong and Ryan Chan, Executive Director : Agnes Man
- Website: ccnctoronto.ca ccncsj.ca

The Chinese Canadian National Council (CCNC) (French: Conseil national des Canadiens chinois pour la justice sociale), known in the Chinese-Canadian community as Equal Rights Council (平權會), is an organization whose purpose is to promote equity, social justice, inclusive civic participation, and respect for diversity. The first CCNC in Ontario was founded in 1980.

In 1985, CCNCTO was founded. They continue to operate today, serving Chinese Canadian community members in the Greater Toronto Area.

CCNC-SJ is a national organization that educates, engages, and advocates for equity and justice for all in Canada. https://ccncsj.ca/

In 2019, a group of leaders and activists from Chinese Canadian communities from different generations recognized that there was a gap to be filled after decades of national efforts against racism and discrimination. These efforts had started 40 years earlier with the Anti-W5 ("Campus Giveaway" episode) campaign, leading to the establishment of the original CCNC, and also the redress movement culminating in the 2006 Parliamentary apology and financial redress package.

Despite some progress over the years, Chinese Canadians still need a strong national voice in the social justice movement. Therefore, CCNC was revived and incorporated in August 2019. CCNC-SJ is built on a track record of community activism with a renewed commitment to educate, engage and advocate for equity and social justice for all in Canada. With the rise of anti-Asian racism in connection with the pandemic, CCNC-SJ has been working with many supporters and allies to raise public and media awareness, and rally community support. CCNC-SJ's board of directors: Amy Go (President), Gary Yee (Vice-President), Susan Eng, Dr Joseph Wong and Ryan Chan. CCNC-SJ's Executive Director: Agnes Man.

Today, CCNCTO and CCNCSJ are completely separate organizations with different governance bodies, staff, membership and volunteers. They both continue to operate in the Greater Toronto Area.

== History ==
The organization was created in 1980, after an incident in September 1979 when the CTV Television Network incorrectly represented Chinese Canadians in an investigative show called W5. In a feature called "Campus Giveaways", CTV used allegedly incorrect statistics to conclude that foreign students were eroding other Canadians' opportunities for a secondary education and benefitting from public universities funded by Canadian taxpayers. All Chinese university students were treated as foreign students, regardless of their real nationality. The show also made numerous racial remarks about the Chinese students. The incident and the resulting campaign were reported in the Canadian media.

In response, Chinese communities across Canada staged protests against CTV and forced the President of CTV to publicly apologize for the W5 feature. After the incident, Chinese who protested against CTV across Canada staged a meeting in Toronto. The meeting called for a stronger voice representing Chinese Canadians nationwide, thus the CCNC was formed. By 1980, the organization had developed nationwide presence with twenty-eight chapters. The United Chinese Community Enrichment Services Society (S.U.C.C.E.S.S.) was accepted as a voting member in 1989.

== Advocacy history ==
Since the formation of the CCNC, it has spoken out against racial discrimination against Chinese in Canada. The CCNC is also involved in controversial issues concerning Chinese in Canada, like forcing the Government of Canada to apologize and redress the head tax that Chinese had to paid from 1885 to 1923.

On November 28, 2005, the Toronto chapter of the CCNC (CCNCTO) was granted the William P. Hubbard Award for Race Relations by the Toronto city government, in recognition of the CCNC's advocacy for Head Tax redress.

In 2012, the CCNC-SJ criticized the Bank of Canada for removing an image of an Asian Canadian from a proposed design for the $100 banknote and condemned the bank for listening to 'racist comments and feedback from the focus group' of its bank note design. The Bank of Canada later apologized to CCNC-SJ.

Since then, CCNC-SJ has been involved in numerous educational programs https://ccncsj.ca/edcuation/, advocacy works https://ccncsj.ca/mentorship-program/ and social justice campaigns https://ccncsj.ca/campaign-toronto-for-all/, https://ccncsj.ca/campaigns-facerace/.

Today, CCNCTO and CCNC-SJ both continue to do advocacy work to advance the rights of Chinese Canadians.
