= The Ward, Toronto =

Former neighbourhood in Toronto, Canada

Coordinates: 43.656°N 79.384°W

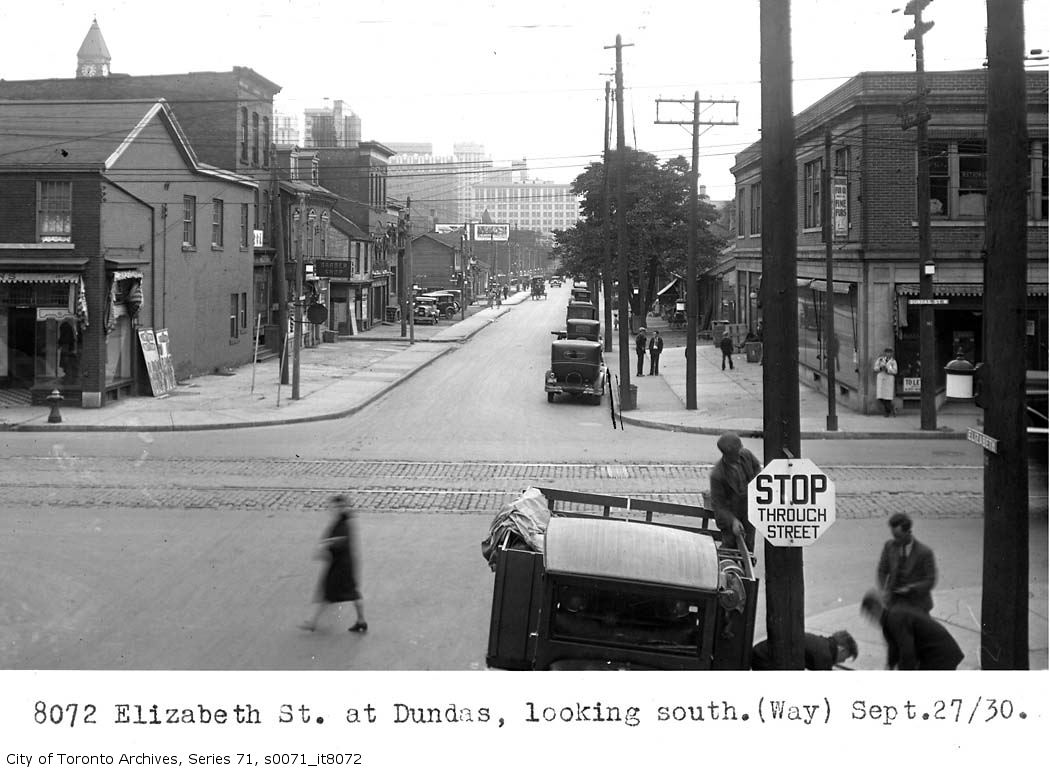
Looking south from the centre of St. John's Ward at Albert Street (Dundas Street) and Elizabeth Street. c. 1930

The Ward (formally St. John's Ward) was a neighbourhood in central Toronto, Ontario, Canada, in the 19th and early 20th centuries. Many new immigrants first settled in the neighbourhood; it was at the time widely considered a slum.

It was bounded by College, Queen, and Yonge Streets and University Avenue, and was centred on the intersection of Terauley Street (now Bay Street) and Albert Street (now Dundas Street).

== Population ==
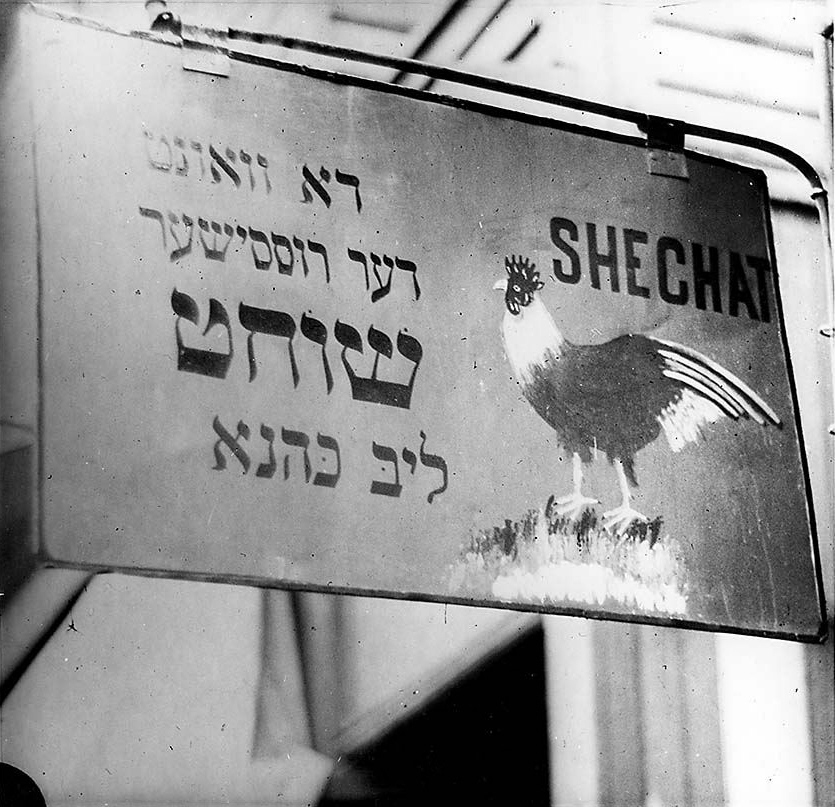
A Yiddish butcher shop sign in the Ward, circa 1910

For several decades of the late 19th and early 20th century, it was a highly dense mixed-use neighbourhood where successive waves of new immigrants would initially settle before establishing themselves. Characterized by authorities in the 19th century as a slum, it was the home of refugees from the European Revolutions of 1848, the Great Famine of Ireland, the Underground Railroad, and then refugees from Russia and Eastern Europe. It was the centre of the city's Jewish community from the late 19th century until the 1920s when the Jewish community moved west to Spadina Avenue and Kensington Market and was also, until the late 1950s, the home of the city's original Chinatown, of many of the city's original Black residents centred on the British Methodist Episcopal Church, at 94 Chestnut Street, and of the city's Italian community until it moved west along College Street to Little Italy. The city's Polish, Ukrainian, Lithuanian, and numerous other non-British immigrants first established themselves in the Ward.

Today, the area is considered a part of what the City of Toronto now calls the Discovery District, the area having been consumed by the central business district. The old neighbourhood has not wholly disappeared. The short restaurant strip on the south side of Dundas Street between University Avenue and Bay Street still retains many buildings which were part of the Ward. The building in the right of the lead photograph in this article is still standing at Dundas and Elizabeth (it is now home to a Japanese restaurant). The YWCA at 87 Elm Street was originally the Toronto House of Industry, a workhouse established in the centre of the Ward in 1848 to serve impoverished residents. Also, a small group of row houses still stands on Elm Street just west of Bay Street, on the south side - possibly the last surviving remnant of the ward's residential character. The area was officially known as St. John's Ward, one of the municipal wards that the city was divided into in the 19th century, but it quickly became known simply as the Ward.

== History ==
=== Pre-colonialism ===
The site where the Ward existed is the territory of the Wendat (Huron) and Petun peoples, the Seneca, and most recently, the Mississaugas of the Credit River (Ontario First Nations Maps, 2016). The area was also home to the Taddle Creek. Now a buried lake, it would have been a significant gathering spot for Indigenous people.

=== 1800s ===
The first settler at the area was James Macaulay. He was granted 100 acres of land and divided up the land for houses. The area was named Macaulaytown in his honour. By 1834, the town was absorbed by the city and this became part of St. Patrick's Ward. That Ward grew so large that by 1852, the part east of what is now University (then College Avenue) was divided off to become St. John's Ward. The house prices were fairly low and the town was considered a pleasant working-class neighbourhood.

In the 1830s, Thornton Blackburn—an African American fugitive slave—began acquiring several properties in the neighbourhood. Blackburn also provided recently arrived fugitive slaves with inexpensive housing. By 1850, many Black families settled in the Ward; five years later, the total Black population grew to 539.

The earliest Jewish settlers in Toronto had come from Britain, the United States, or Western Europe. With only a few hundred Jewish citizens in the city, they settled in several neighbourhoods and mostly integrated with the rest of the city. In the 1890s, an influx of Jewish immigration from Eastern Europe began arriving in Toronto. For the several thousand new arrivals, mostly impoverished and unable to speak English, the densely packed houses of the Ward became their new community.

The Ward was also home to Toronto's first Chinatown as Chinese railway workers settled along York and Elizabeth Streets north of Union Station.

=== 1900s ===
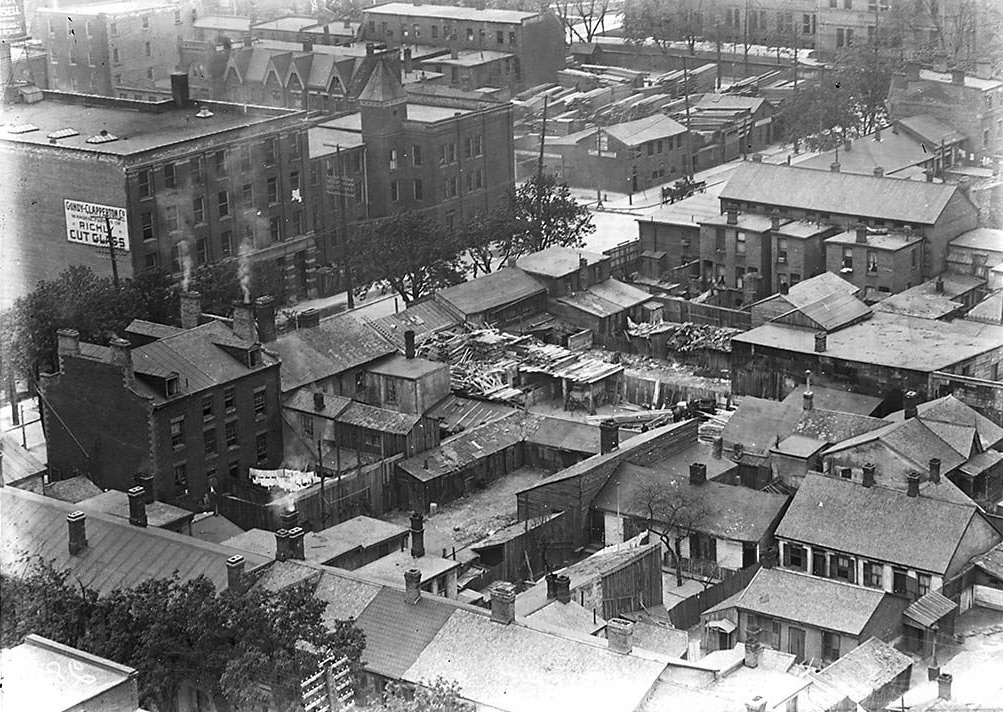
The Ward, 1910

The development of the neighbourhood caused much consternation in Toronto, including anti-Semitic riots and government clearance efforts. In 1909, 8 acres (0.032 km^{2}) of the Ward were demolished to build the Toronto General Hospital. The neighbourhood also began to change in character. As the Jewish immigrants became more settled, they moved westwards to the Kensington Market area and the Ward increasingly became a centre for Italian immigrants, who were then arriving in great numbers. Son to Italian immigrants, Johnny Lombardi was born in the Ward in 1915, and went on to found one of the first multilingual radio stations in Canada, CHIN in 1966. By the 1920s, most Italians had moved west of Bathurst Street and the College-Clinton area had emerged as the city's major Little Italy. By the Second World War, the Ward had become Toronto's first Chinatown. Central Neighbourhood House was established in 1911 as a settlement house to assist new immigrants in the Ward.

In 1911, the City of Toronto's Department of Health began an investigation into the Ward. This was initially resisted by the Toronto City Hall, but was eventually overturned by then-newly appointed Medical Officer of Health, Dr. Charles Hastings who commissioned the in-depth study. The 1911 report detailed over 5, 000 homes with leaky roofs and poor sanitary facilities. A section in the report described the severity of overcrowding, due to both a housing shortage and subdivisions by landlords to extract the most money. It was common for the houses in the Ward to have six or more people share a single room, and for families to build houses in their backyard to fit more people. The report gave rise to various reforms such as stricter housing regulations, food safety measures and education programs.

From the 1920s the Ward was slowly demolished as land was expropriated for office towers and hotels, and, most prominently, the first Chinatown, centred on Elizabeth Street, was expropriated in the 1950s to make way for Nathan Phillips Square, named after the first Jewish mayor of Toronto. Most businesses there moved West to establish what is now considered the "old" Chinatown, centred at Spadina Avenue and Dundas Street. For many decades, the area was almost wholly commercial and institutional, but recent years have seen a return of residents to what used to be the Ward, with multiple condominium towers being erected in the area.

== Notable people ==
- Thornton Blackburn – an African American fugitive slave who started Toronto's first taxicab company
- George Ethelbert Carter – the first Canadian-born black judge
- Johnny Lombardi – an Italian Canadian who founded one of the first multilingual radio stations in Canada, CHIN, in 1966
