= List of Chinatowns =

Chinatowns exist in many cities around the world. Lists of Chinatowns include:

- Chinatowns in Africa
- Chinatowns in the Americas
  - Chinatowns in Canada
  - Chinatowns in Latin America and the Caribbean
  - Chinatowns in the United States
- Chinatowns in Asia
- Chinatowns in Europe
- Chinatowns in Oceania
  - Chinatowns in Australia
