= List of New Zealanders of Chinese descent =

This is a list of New Zealand people, some or all of whose ancestors originated in China.

== Art ==
- Luise Fong, painter, Malaysian Chinese descent
- Denise Kum, artist
- Rozana Lee, artist, Indonesian Chinese descent
- Tanja McMillan (Misery), artist, Tahitian-Chinese descent
- Bev Moon, artist, fourth generation Chinese New Zealander, Poll Tax descendant
- Guy Ngan, artist, born in New Zealand
- Buck Nin, artist, Māori and Chinese descent
- Yuk King Tan, artist
- Brent Wong, painter, born in New Zealand

== Business people ==
- Tom Ah Chee co-founder of the Foodtown supermarket chain and Georgie Pie fast food restaurant chain
- Mai Chen, prominent constitutional lawyer; chair of the short-lived Pan Asian Congress of 2002; 1970s generation and 1.5 generation Taiwanese migrant New Zealander
- Chew Chong (born between 1827 and 1844), merchant
- Appo Hocton (c.1823–26 September 1920), Chinese-born New Zealand servant, landlord, carter and farmer
- Ron Sang architect, art collector, art exhibitor and publisher of New Zealand art books
- Charles Sew Hoy (1836–1901), merchant, gold prospector, and Chinese leader

== Film and television ==
- Yoson An (born 1992), actor, born in Macau
- Michelle Ang (born 1983), New Zealand film and television actress; regular cast member on the Australian show Neighbours, won "Best Actress in A Feature Film" at New Zealand Film and Television Awards 2011 for My Wedding and Other Secrets
- Jess Hong, actress
- Li Ming Hu, known for her role as Li Mei Chen on New Zealand's popular TV show Shortland Street; second-generation New Zealander of Singaporean and Taiwanese parentage
- Raybon Kan, comedian, second-generation New Zealander of Mainland Chinese parentage
- Roseanne Liang, filmmaker; writer and director of the feature film My Wedding and Other Secrets and the short film Banana in a Nutshell
- Geeling Ng, model and actress, born in 1960 in New Zealand; known for Mad Max Beyond Thunderdome (1985), Illustrious Energy (1988) and Desperate Remedies (1993)
- Ant Sang, comic book artist and graphic designer, best known for his work on the Bro'Town television series and the graphic novel Shaolin Burning
- Raven Tao, model, television host, actress and former radio DJ based in Hong Kong

== Journalists and writers ==
- Chiu Kwok-chun (1884–1957), journalist, political reformer, newspaper editor, baptist missionary and community leader.
- Fong, Bickleen Ng( 1931-1998 ): the first Chinese New Zealander who obtained a Master degree, Fong was the author of academic article: Chinese in New Zealand: A study of assimilation
- Tze Ming Mok, cultural commentator, blogger and literary writer; second generation New Zealander of Chinese Singaporean and Malaysian parentage
- Chris Tse, writer and poet; first New Zealand Poet Laureate of Asian descent; author of How to be Dead in a Year of Snakes and He's So MASC
- Alison Wong (born 1960), 'Old Generation' Cantonese; poet and fiction writer; born in Hastings, New Zealand
- Jack Yan, graphic designer and publisher of fashion magazine Lucire; 1.5 generation Hong Kong migrant New Zealander; pioneer in font software; new-media fashion publishing
- Emma Ng, Writer, curator
- Rose Lu, Writer and author of All Who Live on Islands
- Renee Liang, playwright and poet

== Music ==
- Bic Runga, singer/songwriter, of Māori (indigenous New Zealander) and Chinese Malaysian parentage
- Boh Runga, New Zealand recording artist; lead singer and guitarist in New Zealand rock band Stellar; older sister of Bic Runga and Pearl Runga, who are also musicians
- Wing, singer, emigrated from Hong Kong

== Politics ==
- Carlos Cheung, Member of Parliament 2023–Present
- Peter Chin, lawyer, Mayor of Dunedin; 'Old Generation' Cantonese New Zealander
- Meng Foon, Mayor of Gisborne; 'Old Generation' Cantonese New Zealander
- Raymond Huo, Member of Parliament 2008–2014 and 2017–2020; first-generation mainland Chinese
- Nancy Lu, Member of Parliament 2023–Present
- Kenneth Wang, former ACT party MP 2004–2005; came to New Zealand in 1986; graduated from Auckland University with a master's degree in fine Arts in 1988; founder of advertising and media agency Brandwork
- Pansy Wong, New Zealand's first ethnic Chinese MP 1996–2011; first Asian MP and first Asian Cabinet Minister; 1970s generation Hong Kong migrant New Zealander of Shanghai heritage
- Lawrence Xu-Nan, New Zealand politician
- Naisi Chen: member of Parliament for the Labour Party between 2020 and 2023.

== Sports ==
- Li Chunli, gold medal-winning table tennis champion, 1980s generation migrant New Zealander and Mainland Chinese
- Ben Lam (born 1991), nephew of Pat. Competed internationally for the New Zealand Men's Sevens (2012-2016). Currently plays wing for the Hurricanes of Super Rugby. Grew up in Kowloon Hong Kong.
- Pat Lam (born 1968), New Zealand-born rugby union coach of Samoan and Chinese/Hong Kong descent.
- Nigel Ah Wong also known as Nigel Lam Ah Wong, center/wing for Counties Manukau and Top League Kobelco Steelers. Ah Wong is a cousin of Ben and nephew of Pat.
- Tyla Nathan-Wong, New Zealand Women's Sevens (2012–14); Maori Women's Sevens (2012); Auckland Women's Sevens (2012–13); NZ Women's Touch team (2010–present); NZ U19 Women's Touch Team (2011)

== Academic ==
- Professor Manying Ip, Professor of Asian Studies at University of Auckland Waipapa Taumata Rau; author of Being Māori Chinese: Mixed Identities and Dragons on the long white cloud: the making of Chinese New Zealanders
- Professor Sik Hung Ng: Professor of school of Psychology of Victoria University of Wellington
