= Chinese New Zealanders =

People in New Zealand of Chinese ancestry

紐西蘭華人
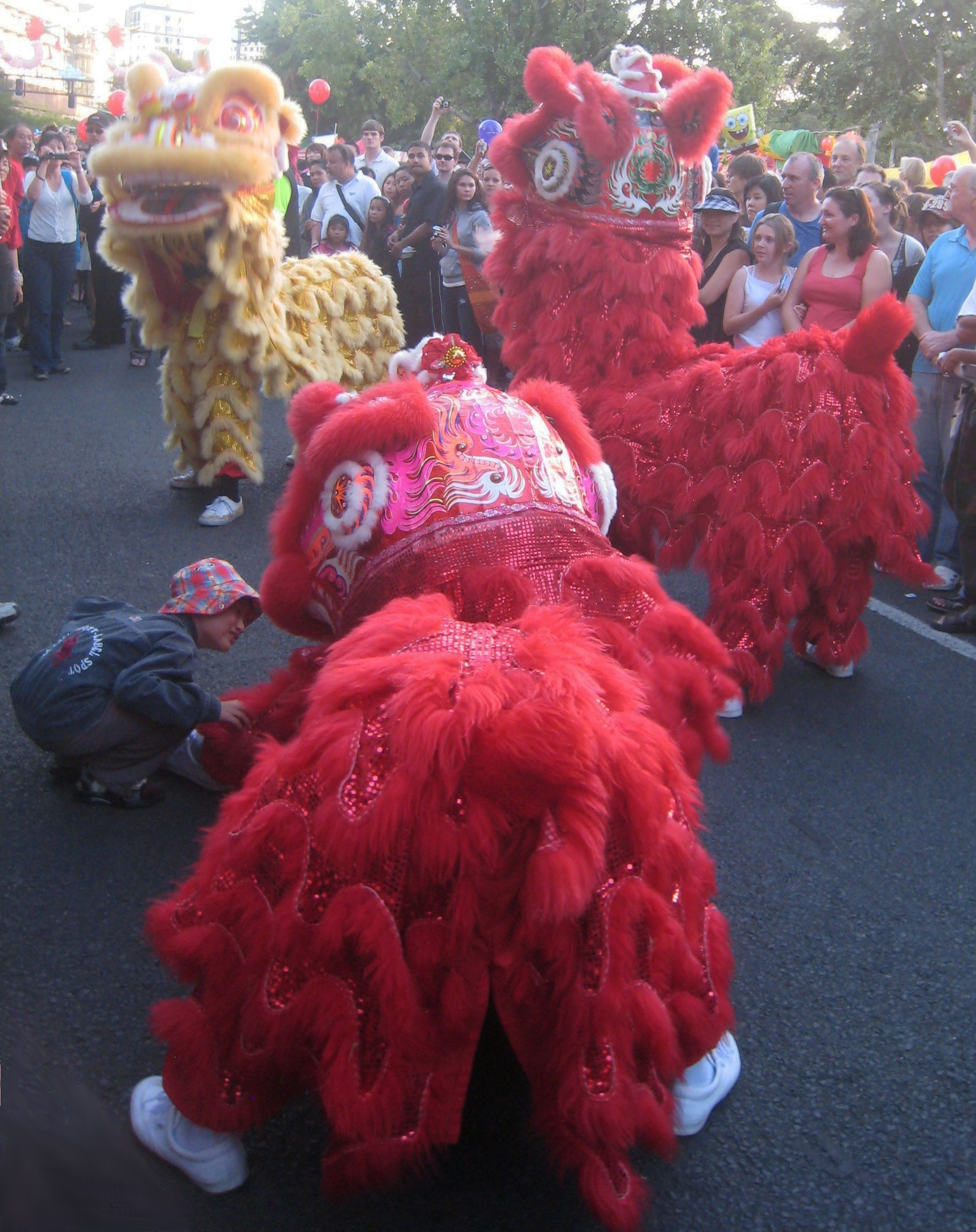
- Lion dancers at the Auckland Lantern Festival

Total population
- 279,039 (2023) 132,906 (born in mainland China) 5.3% of New Zealand's population

Regions with significant populations
- Auckland: 171,309
- Canterbury: 21,516
- Wellington: 21,192
- Waikato: 12,084
- Otago: 5,439
- Manawatū-Whanganui: 4,638

Languages
- New Zealand English; Cantonese; Teochew; Mandarin; Hokkien; Hakka; Other varieties of Chinese

Religion
- Buddhism; Taoism; Christianity; others

Related ethnic groups
- Chinese Australians; Overseas Chinese

Chinese New Zealanders
- Traditional Chinese: 紐西蘭華人
- Simplified Chinese: 纽西兰华人
Transcriptions
Standard Mandarin
- Hanyu Pinyin: Niǔxīlán Huárén
- Bopomofo: ㄋㄧㄡˇ ㄒㄧ ㄌㄢˊ ㄏㄨㄚˊ ㄖㄣˊ
Yue: Cantonese
- Yale Romanization: Náusāilàan Wàyàn

Alternative Chinese name
- Traditional Chinese: 新西蘭華人
- Simplified Chinese: 新西兰华人
Transcriptions
Standard Mandarin
- Hanyu Pinyin: XīnXīlán Huárén
- Bopomofo: ㄒㄧㄣ ㄒㄧ ㄌㄢˊ ㄏㄨㄚˊ ㄖㄣˊ
Yue: Cantonese
- Yale Romanization: Sānsāilàan Wàyàn

Chinese New Zealanders (Note: simplified Chinese: 新西兰华人; traditional Chinese: 紐西蘭華人; pinyin: Niǔxīlán Huárén) or Sino-New Zealanders are New Zealanders of Chinese ancestry. The largest subset of Asian New Zealanders, many of the Chinese immigrants came from Mainland China, Hong Kong, Taiwan, or other countries that have large populations of Chinese diaspora. Today's Chinese New Zealand group is also composed of diasporic communities from Indonesia, Malaysia, Cambodia, Vietnam and Singapore. As of 2018, Chinese New Zealanders account for 4.9% of the population of New Zealand, and are the largest Asian ethnic group in New Zealand, accounting for 36.3% of Asian New Zealanders.

During the 1860s Otago gold rush, immigrants from Guangdong arrived. Due to this historical influx, there is still a distinct Chinese community in Dunedin, whose former mayor Peter Chin is of Chinese descent. However, most Chinese New Zealanders live in the North Island, and are of more recent migrant heritage. Chinese people historically faced severe discrimination in New Zealand, through means varying from the head tax to racist violence. In 2002, the New Zealand Government publicly apologised to China for the racism ethnic Chinese were dealt by New Zealand. Chinese people, culture and cuisine have had a profound impact on modern New Zealand, and are today seen as an inextricable and defining part of the country's rich and diverse culture. Chinese New Year is widely celebrated throughout the country, and although no conventional Chinatowns exist anymore, strongholds of ethnic Chinese exist in Auckland, Wellington, Christchurch and Dunedin. Mandarin is New Zealand's fourth-most-spoken language, while various dialects of Chinese make up the second-most spoken group of languages in New Zealand. Many notable New Zealanders are of Chinese ancestry, such as Augusta Xu-Holland, Bic Runga, Boh Runga, Brent Wong, Chris Tse, Manying Ip, Meng Foon, Michelle Ang, Renee Liang, Roseanne Liang, and Rose Lu.

== Demographics ==
According to the 2023 New Zealand census, there were 279,039 ethnic Chinese in New Zealand, making up 5.6% of New Zealand's population. This is an increase of 31,269 people (12.6%) since the 2018 census, and an increase of 107,628 people (62.8%) since the 2013 census.

There were 131,688 males, 146,580 females, and 783 people of another gender. The median age was 36.2 years, compared with 38.1 years for all New Zealanders; 55,677 people (20.0%) were aged under 15 years, 52,828 (19.0%) were 15 to 29, 136,179 (48.8%) were 30 to 64, and 34,308 (12.3%) were 65 or older.

In terms of population distribution, 69.7% of Chinese New Zealanders lived in the Auckland region, 18.3% lived in the North Island outside the Auckland region, and 12.0% lived in the South Island. The Howick local board area of Auckland has the highest concentration of Chinese people at 27.1%, followed by the Upper Harbour local board area (26.6%) and the Puketāpapa local board area (16.7%). Wellington City had the highest concentration of Chinese people outside of Auckland at 6.7%. Great Barrier Island had the lowest concentration of Chinese people at 0.2%.

The proportion of Chinese New Zealanders born overseas at the 2018 census was 73.3%, compared with 27.1% for all ethnicities. Over half (58.3%) of those born in New Zealand were aged under 15. The majority of Chinese New Zealanders were from Mainland China, Taiwan made up a third of all immigrants and ten percent came from Malaysia. The remainder of Chinese immigrants to New Zealand came from Singapore, Hong Kong, Vietnam, and Indonesia.

=== Language ===
English is by far the most widely spoken language among the usually resident Asian population in New Zealand. Nonetheless, the next most common language after English in New Zealand was Yue or Cantonese (16 percent of Asian people with a language) and Northern Chinese/Mandarin (12 percent). Other Chinese languages spoken in Aotearoa New Zealand include Hokkien, Hakka, and Teochew. Some Chinese New Zealanders also adhere to speaking Malay and Indonesian due to a small influx of Chinese immigrants from Southeast Asia.

The New Zealand Chinese Journals (1920–1972) database contains over 16,000 digitised pages from three Chinese-language publications:

- Man Sing Times (1921–1922)
- New Zealand Chinese Weekly News (1937–1946)
- New Zealand Chinese Growers Monthly Journal (1949 –1972)

=== Religion ===
Religion	%
Buddhist	5.9%
Christian (not further defined)	5.9%
Catholic	3.6%
No religion	70.3%
Object to answering	4.7%

Source: 2018 Census

== History ==
=== Early immigrants (1865–1945) ===
Appo Hocton (Chinese name: 王鶴庭) was the first recorded Chinese emigrant to New Zealand, arriving in Nelson on 25 October 1842. The first significant immigration to New Zealand took place on the strength of two invitations from New Zealand's Otago goldmining region to potential goldminers from Guangdong in 1865. These original goldmining communities suffered discrimination due to racist ideology, the economic competition they represented to the Europeans, and because of the implied 'disloyalty' within their transient, sojourner outlook. While many believe there was a 'White New Zealand' policy similar to Australia's, New Zealand never had such a policy openly sanctioned and was open to Pacific Island immigration from its early history. However, in the 1880s, openly sinophobic political ideology, resulted in the New Zealand head tax, also known as the 'Poll Tax', aimed specifically at Chinese migrants. Racist violence towards Chinese people in New Zealand followed, such as the murder of Joe Kum Yung by white supremacist Lionel Terry. This attack occurred in Haining Street in Te Aro, Wellington, on 24 September 1905, in the centre of what was once was a large Chinatown. Despite official barriers, the Chinese still managed to develop their communities in this period, and numbers were bolstered when some wives and children from Guangdong Province were allowed in as refugees just before World War II.

Significant archives of Chinese communities in Otago were created by Presbyterian reverend Alexander Don in the late 19th century, in his mostly unsuccessful attempts to convert Chinese goldmining communities to Christianity. These archives, which form a part of the Ng New Zealand Chinese Heritage Collection, became a UNESCO New Zealand Memory of the World Register in 2017.

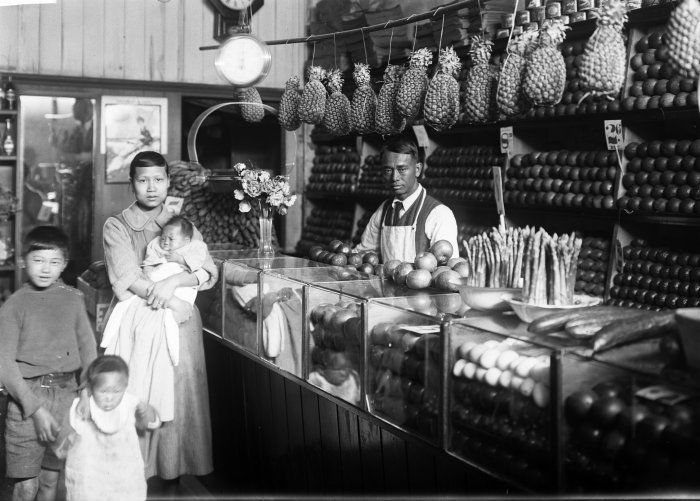
A Chinese family in their grocer's store c.1910–20

New Zealanders of Chinese descent also fought for New Zealand in World War II. During World War I, Cecil Alloo rose from the ranks to become the first commissioned officer of Chinese descent in New Zealand's armed forces. Chain migration from Guangdong continued until the new Communist Chinese regime stopped emigration. This original group of Cantonese migrants and their descendants are referred to in New Zealand as 'Old Generation' Chinese, and are now a minority within the overall Chinese population.

John Hall's government passed the Chinese Immigration Act 1881. This imposed a £10 tax per Chinese person entering New Zealand, and permitted only one Chinese immigrant for every 10 tons of cargo. Richard Seddon's government increased the tax to £100 per head in 1896, and tightened the other restriction to only one Chinese immigrant for every 200 tons of cargo.

=== After the Second World War (1945–1999) ===
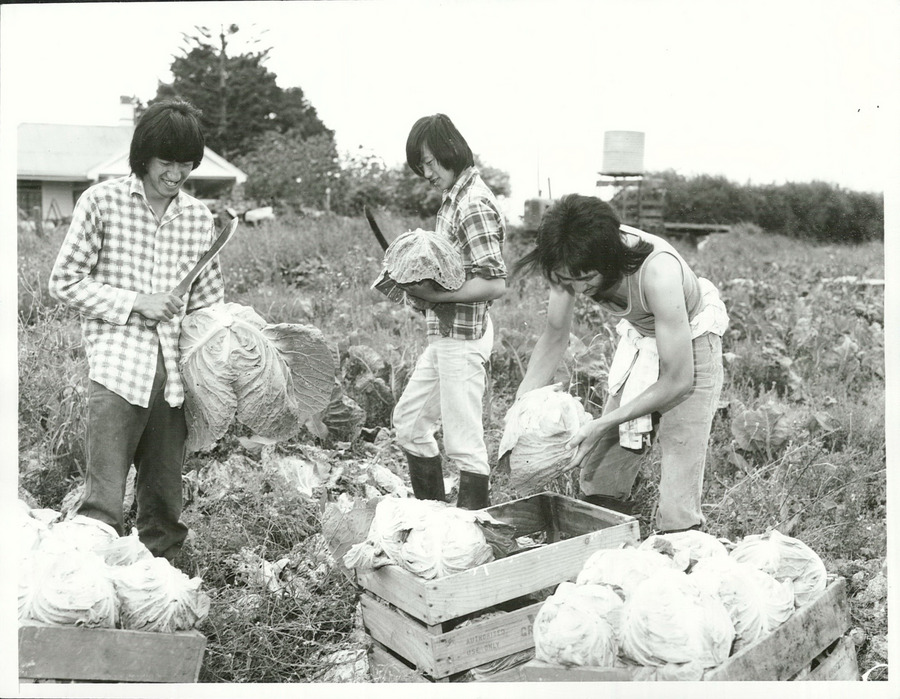
Chinese market gardeners in Pukekohe (1975).

Ethnic Chinese communities from countries other than China began establishing themselves in New Zealand between the 1960s and 1980s. These included ethnic Chinese refugees from Cambodia, Vietnam and Laos following the conflicts and upheavals in those countries; Commonwealth (i.e. English educated) professional migrants from Hong Kong, Singapore and Malaysia; and Samoan Chinese as part of the substantial Pacific labour migrations of the 1970s. There was also a growth in the relationship between mainland China and New Zealand during this period. Relationships were fostered by Chinese New Zealanders such as Nancy Kwok-Goddard.

Between 1987 and 1996, a fundamental change in New Zealand's immigration policy led to a substantial influx of ethnic Chinese business, investor, and professional migrants, particularly from Hong Kong and Taiwan. This period saw a spike in overall migration from the Asian region, including other Chinese people from East Asia and Southeast Asia. New Zealand's immigration system increasingly experienced the impact of global events, such as the Tiananmen Square protests of 1989 and the May 1998 riots of Indonesia in which many Chinese were affected.

=== Since 2000 and later discrimination ===
Chinese New Zealanders by the turn of the 21st century had become a more established and integral part of New Zealand society, with new waves of immigrants arriving from the 1970s and 1980s onwards integrating into the existing legacy of Chinese who had been in the country since the mid-nineteenth century. Chinese New Zealanders, alongside other Asian New Zealanders, are now more embraced as a part of the country's cosmopolitan heritage and continue to shape the culture and economy of New Zealand; this has become most notable in Auckland, wherein New Zealanders of all backgrounds enjoy the material aspects of Asian popular and traditional culture as normalised parts of everyday life; with the likes of Bubble Tea, Anime, and K-Pop having become mainstream parts of youth and urban culture.

Chinese in New Zealand today make up one of the country's wealthiest and most highly educated ethnic communities. They also make up a significant proportion of business owners and workers within the country's private economy, a privileged status which has at times added to historic prejudices played into by demagogic groups.

An increasing number of Chinese New Zealanders since the early 2000s have taken on key positions in government and various political institutions, with the 2020 General Election seeing New Zealand Parliament's share of Asian members rise to an all-time high.

Newer Chinese immigrant arrivals are generally well-educated professionals or businesspeople with internationally transferable skills. Many have chosen to come because they want to raise their children in a less competitive educational environment, or because they want a more leisurely lifestyle and new employment opportunities.

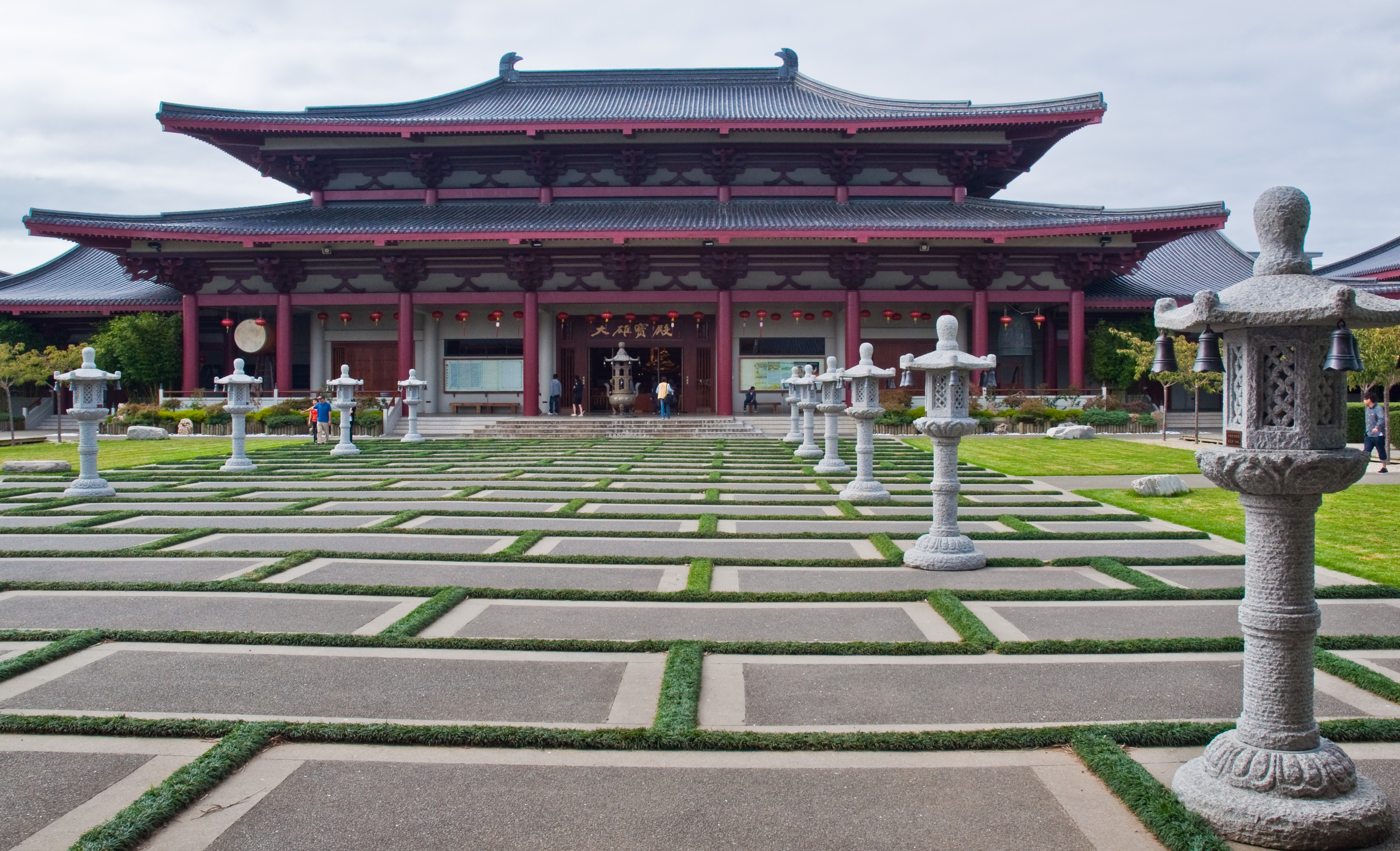
Fo Guang Shan Buddhist Temple, Flat Bush, Auckland. This temple serves the sizeable local Chinese community.

In 2002, the New Zealand Government publicly apologised to Chinese New Zealanders for the poll tax that had been levied on their ancestors a century ago.

In 2010, Mainland China for the first time became New Zealand's top source country for family immigration through the Family Sponsored Stream and the Partnership policy in New Zealand, as large numbers of Chinese nationals choose to study abroad in New Zealand and then gain the recognised qualifications to obtain skilled employment in New Zealand.

In the New Zealand's 2018 national census, Asian New Zealanders reached 15.5% of the country's total population an increase from 11.8% in 2013, with Chinese New Zealanders making up 36% of all peoples of Asian heritage.

During the worldwide spike in sinophobia during the COVID-19 pandemic, MP Raymond Huo was among many politicians who condemned the racial abuse suffered by the country's Chinese community. An online petition to prevent people from China from entering the country was signed by more than 18,000 people. In Canterbury, an email was sent to a Chinese-origin student's parent, which reportedly said, "our Kiwi kids don't want to be in the same class with your disgusting virus spreaders."

Mayor of Auckland Phil Goff said he was "sickened" by the reports of Asian-origin people being racially targeted at swimming pools, public transport and restaurants. In February 2021, the Chinese consulate in Auckland was affected by a phony bomb threat made by individuals on an events website Aucklife that they had hacked. Their motive was reportedly a punitive response against China for allegedly causing the pandemic.

== Politics ==
On 21 September, during the 2023 New Zealand general election Trace Research published the results of a survey which found that 70.9% of ethnic Chinese voters supported the National Party, 13.4% supported ACT, 12.5% supported Labour, and 1.4% supported the Greens. Support for right-wing parties within the Chinese community rose in 2023 while support for Labour declined compared with the 2020 general election. Trace Research found that ethnic Chinese voters were most concerned with rising living costs, law and order, economic growth, racial equality and healthcare.

== Socioeconomics ==
=== Education ===
Learning is revered in Chinese culture, as in many cultures. It reinforces the child's overall cognitive development during their early childhood years. Thus a sense of family obligation acts as children's extrinsic motivation to perform well academically.

A high value on education is placed among Chinese New Zealand families. Chinese New Zealanders rank the fourth highest ethnic group among Asian New Zealanders with 22 percent holding a bachelor's degree. Among New Zealand-born Chinese, 23 percent had obtained a degree comparable to 23% for Asian New Zealanders but nearly twice the national average of 12%.

=== Employment ===
Among the Asian populations, several groups had rates of labour force participation as high as, if not higher than, that of the average New Zealand population. The New Zealand-born Chinese population had high rates of participation, with 75 percent of Chinese New Zealanders participating in the workforce. Overseas-born New Zealand Chinese, who accounted for a third of the Asian population, had a labour force participation rate of 45 percent in 2001. Overseas-born Chinese people (86 percent) were slightly more likely to hold a qualification than Chinese people born in New Zealand (83 percent) New Zealand-born and overseas-born Chinese (47 percent and 44 percent, respectively) are working in selected white collar professions compared to 40% for the total New Zealand population and 43% for Asian New Zealanders. Chinese New Zealanders also register an unemployment rate lower than the national average, where overseas-born Chinese had an unemployment rate of 15% and New Zealand-born Chinese had an unemployment rate of 8%. Therefore, on average, the overall unemployment rate of 11.5% was lower than the total New Zealand population of 17%.

At the 2013 census, the largest employment industries of Chinese New Zealanders were accommodation and food services (16.0%); retail trade (13.5%); professional, scientific and technical services (11.0%); manufacturing (8.8%); and health care and social assistance (7.4%).

=== Economics ===
The Chinese in New Zealand today make up one of the country's wealthiest and most highly educated ethnic communities. They also make up a significant proportion of business owners and workers within the country's private economy, a privileged status which has at times added to historic prejudices played into by demagogic groups.

An increasing number of Chinese New Zealanders since the early 2000s have taken on key positions in government and various political institutions, with the 2020 General Election seeing New Zealand Parliament's share of Asian Members rise to an all-time high.

Newer Chinese immigrant arrivals are generally well-educated professionals or businesspeople with internationally transferable skills. Many have chosen to come because they want to raise their children in a less competitive educational environment, or because they want a more leisurely lifestyle and new employment opportunities.

=== Cuisine ===
Chinese cuisine has heavily influenced New Zealand cuisine in general, with the influence heavily seen in Chinese restaurants and fish and chip shops, the latter of which are today overwhelmingly owned by New Zealanders of Chinese descent, having previously been owned largely by Greek and to a lesser extent Croatian immigrants. Influence is also seen by the adoption of Chinese-influenced "street food", such as the blue cheese wontons that were developed in the Cuba Precinct of central Wellington.

== See also ==
- Fo Guang Shan Temple, Auckland
- Chinatowns in Oceania
- Chinese Australians
- Chinese in Fiji
- Head tax (New Zealand)
- Jook-sing
- People's Republic of China–New Zealand relations
- China–New Zealand relations
- New Zealand-Taiwan relations
