= Liantang =

Liantang may refer to:

- Liantang Subdistrict, a subdistrict of Luohu District, Shenzhen, China
- Liantang, Gaoyao, a town in Zhaoqing, Guangdong, China
- Liantang (练塘镇), a town in Qingpu District, Shanghai, China
- Liantang (练塘), a former town in Changshu, China
