= Rozana Lee =

Aotearoa Asian artist

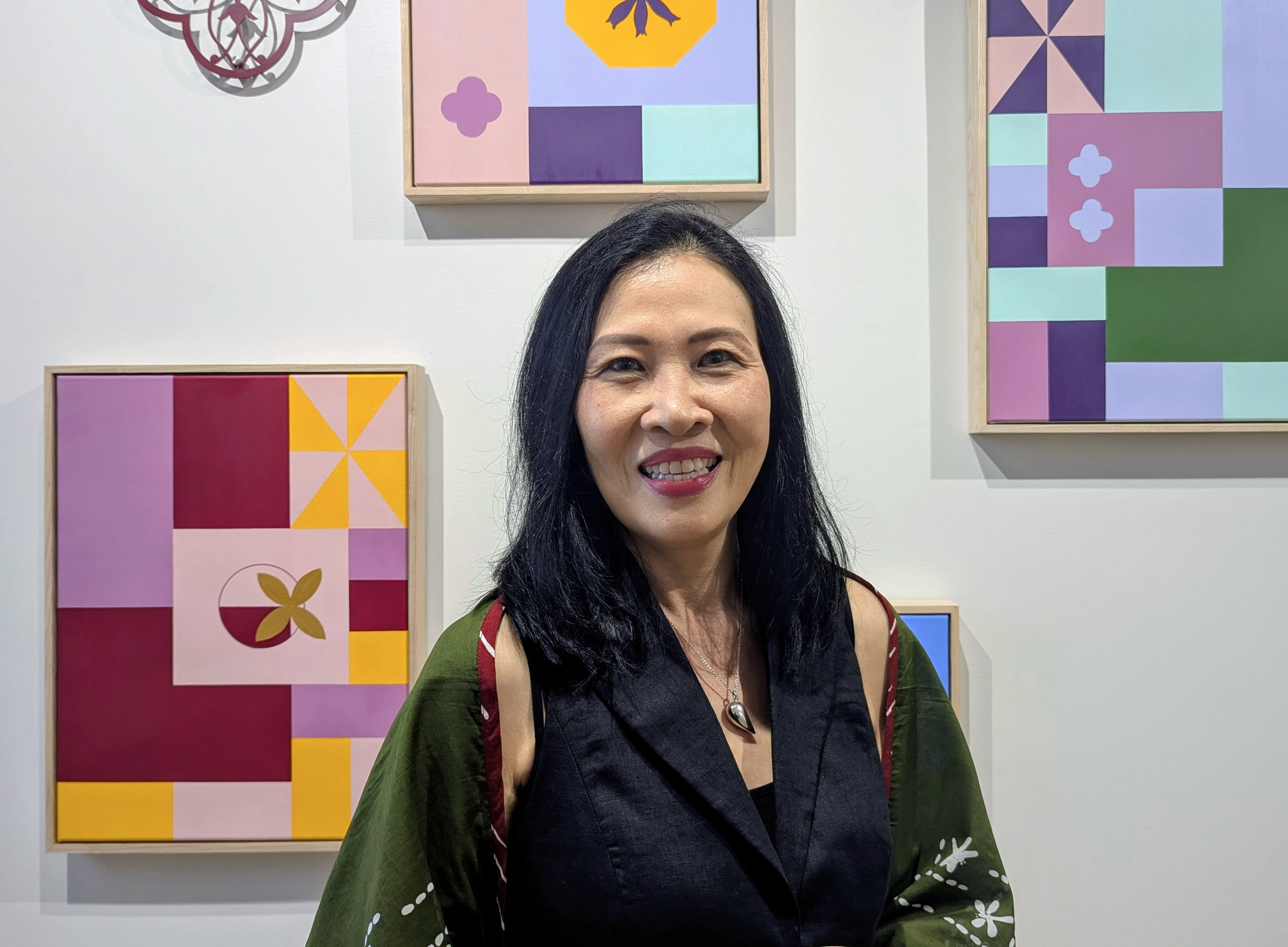
- Lee in 2025
- Born: 1970 (age 55–56); Banda Aceh, Indonesia
- Education: University of Auckland
- Known for: textiles and painting
- Style: Patterns

Rozana Lee (born 1970) is a New Zealand artist of Chinese Indonesian descent, notable for her use of textiles.

== Early life and family ==
Lee is a fourth generation Chinese Indonesian, She fled Jakarta to Singapore at a time ethnic Chinese were being severely persecuted throughout Indonesia. Lee never felt belong in Indonesia.

During the Boxing Day Tsunami, Lee lost her mother Rosna, her relatives, childhood friends and family home in Aceh, Indonesia. Lee's father, Karimun survived the tsunami.

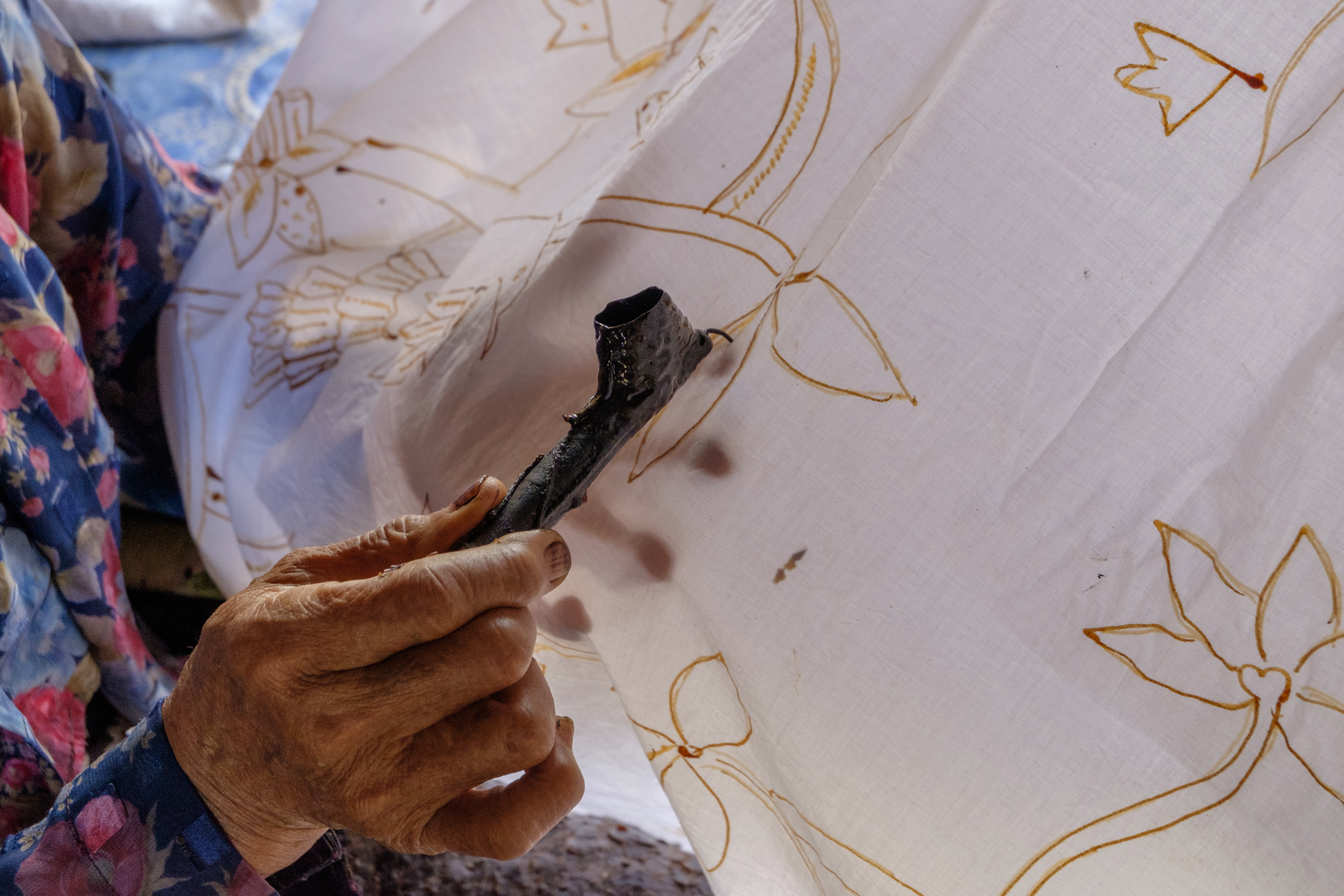
Applying melted wax on batik textile using canting tool.

== Art career ==
Lee's father and grandfather had a textile shop in Aceh, so Lee grew up with fabrics, with many patterns and colours, and there is always plenty of excess fabric. The shop was destroyed during the Boxing Day Tsunami.

Her artistic journey reflects cultural connections across Central and South East Asia, Pacific Ocean, and Central America. Lee use Indonesian Batik textiles to investigate how cultures evolve through the interactions and exchanges. Her work resonates with her personal experiences of prejudice in Indonesia, and highlights common motifs found in trading ports where diverse cultures come together. This exploration not only showcases the patterns and symbols of different cultures but also underscores the stories behind them and the relationships that shape them.

Lee's research examines how patterns convey historical and aesthetic knowledge of specific cultures, while also serving as a link between generations, diverse cultures, and countries through various means, including early migration, the introduction of religion, international trade, colonisation and cross-cultural exchanges. She makes the patterns with the beeswax with a canting tool on textiles, and the tie-dye she uses all have historical significance.

Her work is held in many private collections overseas and in New Zealand, including the Circuit, University of Auckland, Art House Trust, Govett-Brewster Art Gallery, Christchurch Art Gallery.

=== Residencies ===
- 2024: Redbase Foundation, Yogyakarta, Indonesia
- 2024: Studio Kura, Fukuoka, Japan
- 2024: Leibniz Institute for Regional Geography, Leipzig, Germany
- 2023: The Zhelezka Project, Kazakhstan, Uzbekistan, and Kyrgyzstan
- 2019: Making Space, Guangzhou, China
- 2016: Instinc Gallery, Singapore

=== Selected solo and collaborative exhibitions ===
- 2025: Echoes Through Time (with Bev Moon), Bergman Gallery, Auckland, New Zealand
- 2024: Spring is as sweet as shirotsumekusa, Studio Kura, Fukuoka, Japan
- 2024: Windows to the world, Corban Estate Arts Centre, Auckland, New Zealand
- 2023: Sekali pendatang, tetap pendatang, Te Uru Waitākere Contemporary Gallery, Auckland, New Zealand
- 2022: A Way of Being Free, Northart Gallery, Auckland, New Zealand
- 2021: Birds from Another Continent, Papakura Art Gallery, Auckland, New Zealand

=== Selected group exhibitions ===
- 2025: Aotearoa Art Fair, Redbase Gallery, Viaduct Events Centre, Auckland, New Zealand
- 2024: Horizon 2, Bergman Gallery, Auckland, New Zealand
- 2023: Belonging: Stories of Contemporary New Zealand Asian Artists, Bergman Gallery, Auckland, New Zealand
- 2023: 胎息, Tai Xi (That birth breath), TuiTui, Auckland, New Zealand
- 2022: Several degrees of attention, Govett-Brewster Art Gallery, New Plymouth, New Zealand
- 2022: Fluid Borders: Far Nearer, The Pah Homestead, Auckland, New Zealand
