= Emma Ng =

New Zealand writer and curator

- Born: Katherine Emma Ng; 1990 (age 35–36); Auckland, New Zealand
- Education: Victoria University of Wellington; School of Visual Arts New York City
- Occupations: Writer; curator
- Writing career
- Notable work: Old Chinese New Chinese

Katherine Emma Ng (born 1990) is a New Zealand writer and curator. Of Chinese descent, she is most known for her contributions to research about Chinese New Zealand history and experiences.

== Life and career ==
Ng was born in 1990 in Auckland, to New Zealand-born Chinese parents. Her father's family had settled in Auckland, and owned a fruit shop at the bottom of Queen Street, while her mother's family lived in Dunedin where they owned and operated a Chinese restaurant. Her grandparents moved to New Zealand from Guangdong, China.

Ng's primary education was at Victoria Avenue School in the Auckland suburb of Remuera. She later lived in Wellington for seven years and studied at Victoria University of Wellington. She graduated from Victoria with two degrees—a Bachelor of Arts with honours and a Bachelor of Design Innovation—in 2013.

Ng has worked at various art institutions across New Zealand, including the Dowse Art Museum, and Enjoy Contemporary Art Space from January 2014 to August 2016. She has also written for publications including The Pantograph Punch, ArtAsiaPacific, The Spinoff and Art New Zealand. Ng lived in New York City where she completed a master's degree in design research and criticism at the School of Visual Arts.

=== Books ===
Ng's 2017 book, Old Asian, New Asian, explores the persistent racism and anti-Asian sentiment present in New Zealand toward Chinese New Zealanders. The book's conception was in response to the Labour Party's leaked data analytics in 2015, which surveyed New Zealand house buyers with 'Chinese' surnames. The book highlights concepts such as yellow peril and the model minority myth, which affect contemporary experiences of Chinese New Zealanders, as well as discussing historical race-based laws including the Chinese Immigrants Act and the poll tax established in 1881. In the book, Ng notes her own experiences of Sinophobia and discrimination.
