= Bev Moon =

New Zealand artist

- Born: 1968 (age 57–58); Wellington, New Zealand
- Known for: painting, knitting
- Notable work: Fortune
- Style: knitted yum cha, mixed media

Bev Moon (born 1968, Wellington, New Zealand) is an Auckland-based, New Zealand artist of Seyip, Taishanese and Cantonese descent, who is known for her knitted yum cha artworks. Moon is also a New Zealand Chinese Poll Tax descendant.

== Early life and family ==
Moon was born and raised in Wellington, and is descended from Taishanese men who arrived in New Zealand searching for gold in the 1880s. The wives had to stay in China because of the Chinese Poll Tax placed on Chinese immigrants. It was the aim for the New Zealand government to made Chinese immigrants difficult to come to New Zealand.

During the Second World War, Moon's grandmother and mother were two out of the five hundred women and children from China given refuge temporarily by the New Zealand government to flee the Sino-Japanese War.

== Art career and Fortune ==
Moon's artwork installation, Fortune, is made as a tribute to her mother and grandmother, both of whom were skilled cooks and knitters. During the 2021 COVID-19 lockdown in Auckland, Moon challenged herself to knit dumplings in the shapes she used to make with her mother as a child. She first started with BBQ pork buns and created as many dishes as she could before March 2022, which would have been her mother’s 90th birthday if she had been still alive.

Fortune was later exhibited throughout the country. Moon felt it was significant to show Fortune in Gore, as her family have deep history and connections to the area, because her ancestors came to New Zealand from China looking for gold and then ended up running a small laundry business in Gore in the 1880s. Fortune explores various difficulties and opportunities experienced by the early New Zealand Chinese settlers, through food and craft. Fortune was supported by The Chinese Poll Tax Heritage Trust.

Moon also made a smaller version of Fortune for the exhibition A Place to Call Home: Contemporary New Zealand Asian Art, in 2023 at Bergman Gallery, and was invited by the gallery again in 2024 for Belonging, Stories of the Contemporary New Zealand Asian Artists. Fortune in Bergman Gallery featured a cat in the centre holding a bowl of chips, a reference to Moon's father's 32-year-old fish and chips business. She stated she aims to educate people about the Chinese Poll Tax with Fortune. In 2025, Fortune was acquired by Te Papa for their collection.

=== Selected solo and collaborative exhibitions ===
- 2025: Echoes Through Time (with Rozana Lee), Bergman Gallery, Auckland, New Zealand
- 2024-2025: Fortune, Wellington Museum, Wellington, New Zealand
- 2024: Fortune, Whanganui Regional Museum, Whanganui, New Zealand
- 2024: Fortune, Aratoi Wairarapa Museum of Art and History, Masterton, New Zealand
- 2023: Fortune, Eastern Southland Gallery, Gore, New Zealand
- 2023: Fortune, Waikato Museum, Hamilton, New Zealand
- 2023: Fortune, Hocken Collections, University of Otago, Dunedin, New Zealand
- 2023: Fortune, Whirinaki Whare Taonga, Upper Hutt, New Zealand

=== Selected group exhibitions ===
- 2025: Aotearoa Art Fair, Bergman Gallery, Viaduct Events Centre, Auckland, New Zealand
- 2024-2025: Art of Asia, Auckland War Memorial Museum, Auckland, New Zealand
- 2024-2025: Material Matters, The Suter Art Gallery, Nelson, New Zealand
- 2024: Belonging, Stories of the Contemporary New Zealand Asian Artists, Bergman Gallery, Auckland, New Zealand
- 2023: A Place to Call Home: Contemporary New Zealand Asian Art, Bergman Gallery, Auckland, New Zealand
- 2022: Pick’n’Mix, Studio 445, Karangahape Road, Auckland, New Zealand
- 2021: Crackerjack, Browne School of Art, Auckland, New Zealand
