= Chiu Kwok-chun =

New Zealand journalist, newspaper editor and missioner (1884–1957)

- 趙國俊牧師
- Born: 1884; Liantang, Gaoyao District, Guangdong province, Qing dynasty
- Died: 17 April 1957; Wellington
- Occupations: Journalist; newspaper editor; baptist missioner
- Years active: 1913–1948
- Spouse: Leong Moo-kwong (m. 1902)
- Children: 4

Chiu Kwok-chun (1884 – 17 April 1957) was a New Zealand journalist, political reformer, newspaper editor, Baptist missioner and community leader. He was born in Guangdong Province, China in 1884.

== Early life and education ==
Chiu Kwok-chun was born in Liantang, Gaoyao district, Guangdong province in the Qing dynasty in 1884 to a meat merchant, Chiu Pan-sing, and his wife Shen See. He was born as the third of four sons. As a young child, Chiu received traditional Chinese education before going on to study in Guangzhou.

== Career ==
=== In China and Australia ===
Chiu had converted to Christianity before he became a teacher at the Piu Ching Baptist middle school in Guangzhou. During this time, the Qing dynasty's control over China weakened and Chiu joined the Tongmenghui. Due to his skill in writing and his devotion to republicanism, he was recruited by the Kuomintang to edit its newspaper, Chinese Republic News, in Sydney, Australia. In September 1913, with help from the Kuomintang, he arrived in Sydney after being exempted from anti-Chinese immigration laws. As a writer, Chiu attacked the President of China, Yuan Shikai, calling him authoritarian. Chiu also called for a new revolution to overthrow Yuan. However, his writings angered pro-Yuan supporters in the Chinese community of Sydney, which led to Chiu being deported by Australian immigration authorities.

=== In New Zealand ===
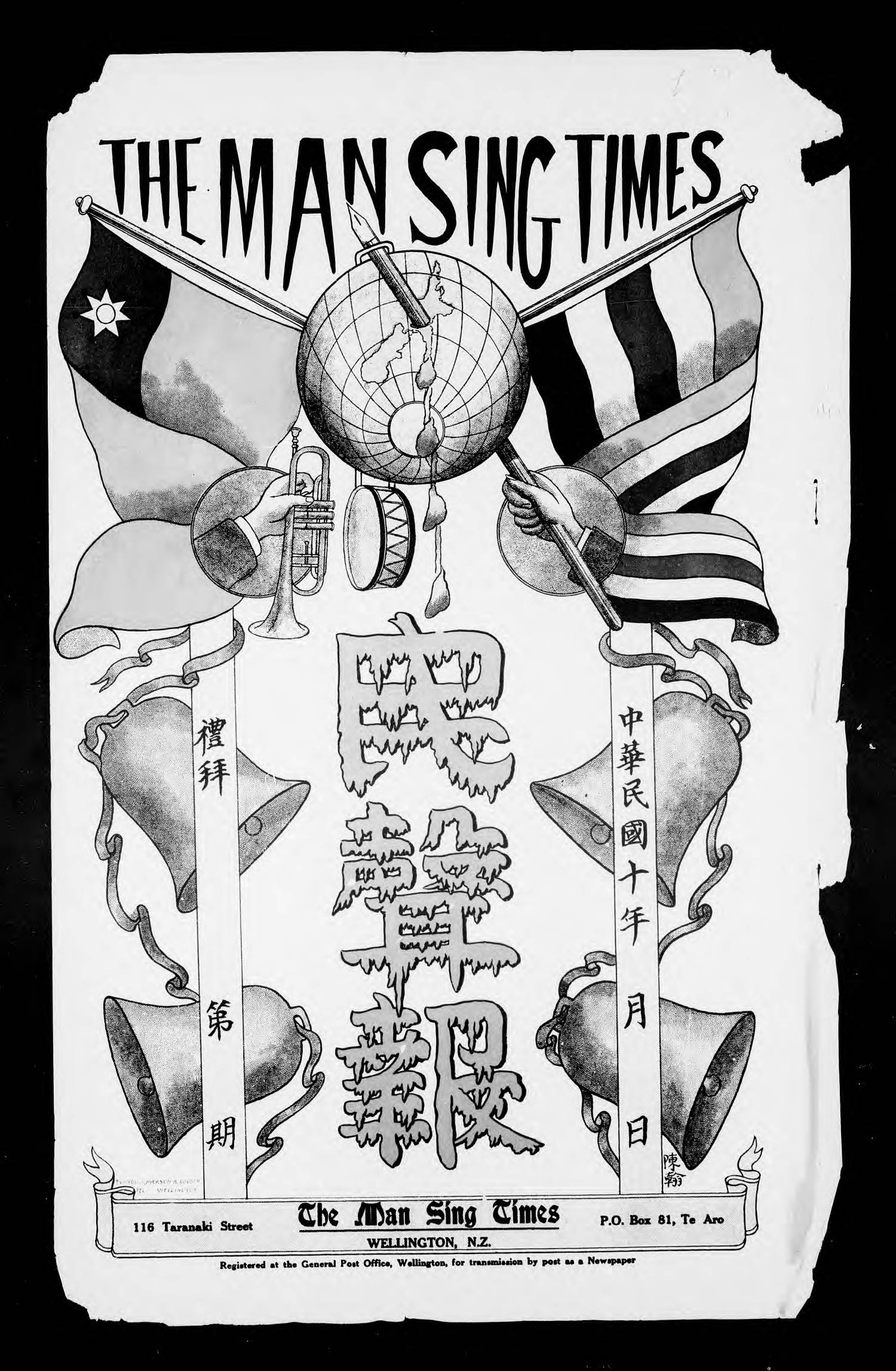
The first issue of the Man Sing Times (Vol. 1, No. 1), established by Chiu Kwok-chun of the Wellington Branch of the Australasian KMT, 1921.

From Sydney, Chiu was supported by the Kuomintang to travel to Wellington, New Zealand, in August 1915 on board the Ulimaroa. Like in Australia, he was exempted from anti-Chinese immigration restrictions in New Zealand. In Wellington, Chiu also served as a baptist missioner, baptising 14 Chinese from 1916 to 1918. Chiu was quite able to draw large crowds and in 1917 he applied for a position in the Auckland Presbyterian Chinese mission, where he was recommended by both European and Chinese Christians. However he was rejected, due to his links to the Kuomintang.

Following his return to New Zealand from his visit to China in February 1921, he was forced to pay the poll tax on arrival under the pseudonym Ping Ming 平鳴, which came from the Chinese proverb 'Bu ping ze ming' 不平則鳴. Chiu then established a Kuomintang newspaper, Man Sing Times. Its first issue was published in July 1921 and its last in June 1922. Despite its short life, Chiu established himself as a leader among the Chinese community in New Zealand.

Throughout the rest of the 1920s in New Zealand, Chiu continued to serve as a baptist missioner. When the country was hit by the Great Depression, the Anglican and Baptist Chinese missions amalgamated together with Chiu as its first missioner from October 1932 to May 1940. Along with this, he organised lessons on the Chinese language for young members of the Chinese community, in which he also established the Baptist Chinese language school in 1933. When he resigned as a missioner in May 1940, he began working at the Chinese consulate in Wellington. He also wrote, edited and helped publish issues of the New Zealand Chinese Weekly News, which continued publication throughout the rest of World War II. He resigned from working in the Chinese consulate in 1948.

== Personal life ==
In 1902, Chiu married Leong Moo-kwong, in which they had two sons (Chiu Man-chung and Chiu Man-ken) and two daughters together. When he left China for Australia, Leong Moo-kwong stayed back in China. Chiu would return to China to stay with his family from 1919 to February 1921. Following his establishment of the Baptist Chinese language school in 1933, Chiu got his eldest son, Chiu Man-chung, to come to New Zealand. He also organised for his wife to come to New Zealand in 1940.

In 1946, he suffered a severe accident, which he took a long time to recover from. He died in Wellington on 17 April 1957. He was survived by his wife, all his children, and his 17 grandchildren.
