= Canting =

Javanese pen-like tool for batik-making process

Cantingꦕꦤ꧀ꦛꦶꦁ
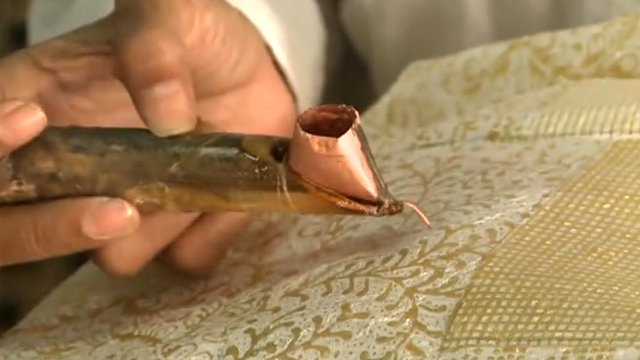
- Canting used in the batik-making process
- Other names: tjanting (in Javindo)
- Types: Rengreng, Isen, Cecek, Klowong, Tembokan, Cecekan, Loron, Telon, Prapatan, Liman, Byok, Galaran
- Used with: Wax, Batik
- Inventor: Javanese
- Manufacturer: Javanese (part of Native Indonesians, Java-origin)
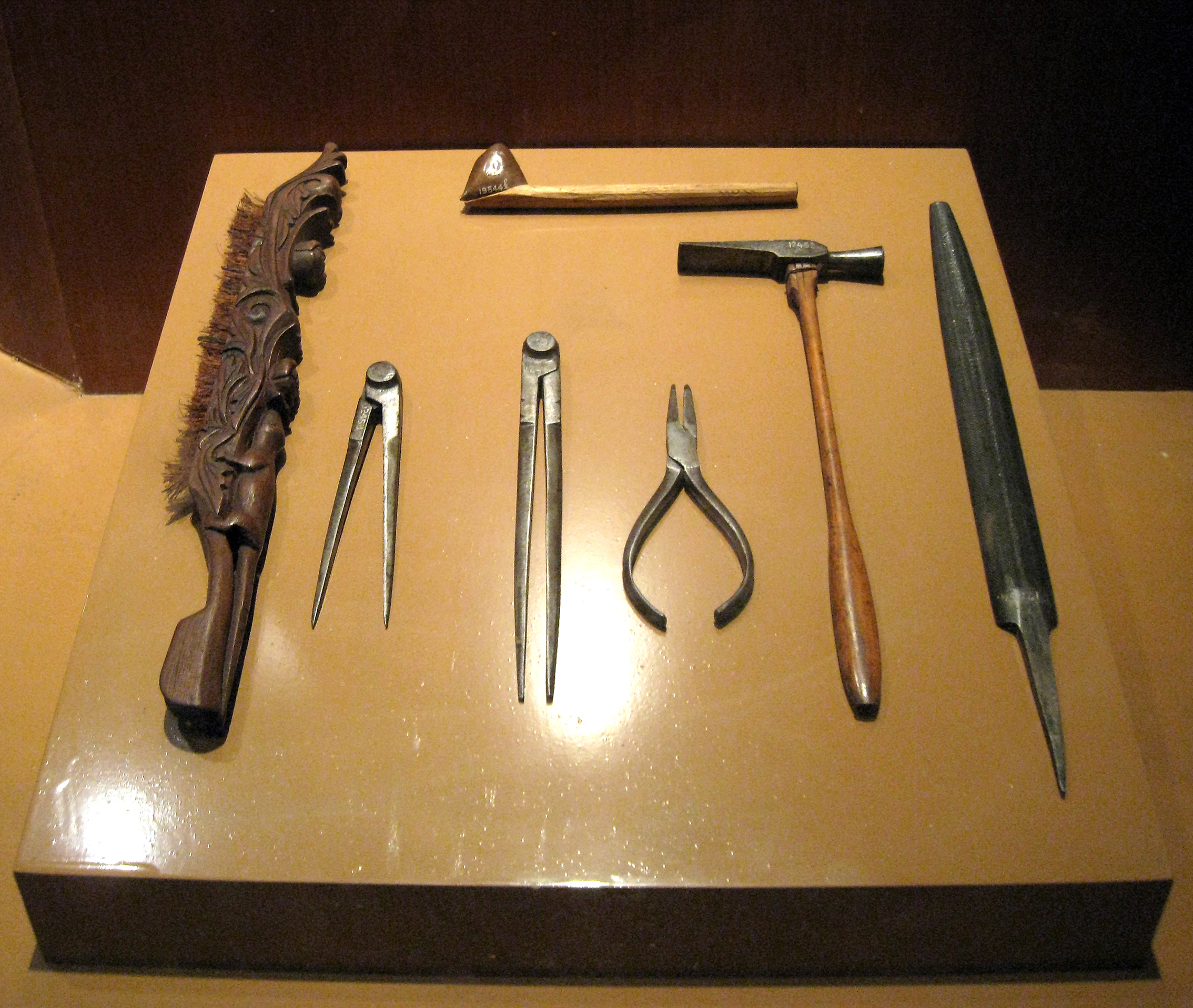
- Related: The batik making tools displayed at National Museum of Indonesia, Jakarta. From center top: canting a fine tool to apply wax; from left to right: wooden brush with coconut fibre hair, Iron calipers for measuring, also calipers, tongs, hammer, and file.

Canting (/t͡ʃɑntɪŋ/, from Javanese ꦕꦤ꧀ꦛꦶꦁ, canṭing; Javindo: tjanting) is a pen-like tool used to apply liquid hot wax (malam) in the traditional native Javan batik-making process in Indonesian island of Java (mainly and originally), more precisely for the batik tulis (lit. 'hand-crafted batik'). Traditional Canting consists of copper wax-container with small pipe spout and bamboo handle. It is commonly made of copper, bronze, zinc or iron materials, as well as teflon in modern-days.

== Etymology ==
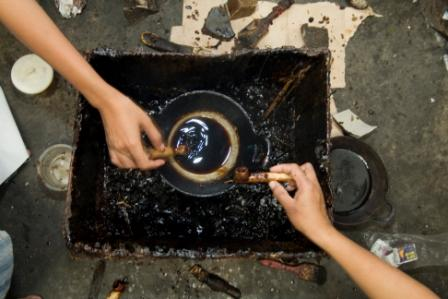
Batik crafters scooping hot liquid wax using canting at a batik workshop in Gulurejo village, near Yogyakarta

Canting is derived from Javanese word of canthing ꦕꦤ꧀ꦛꦶꦁ (IPA: t͡ʃɑnʈɪŋ) which means the small scooping tool.

== History ==
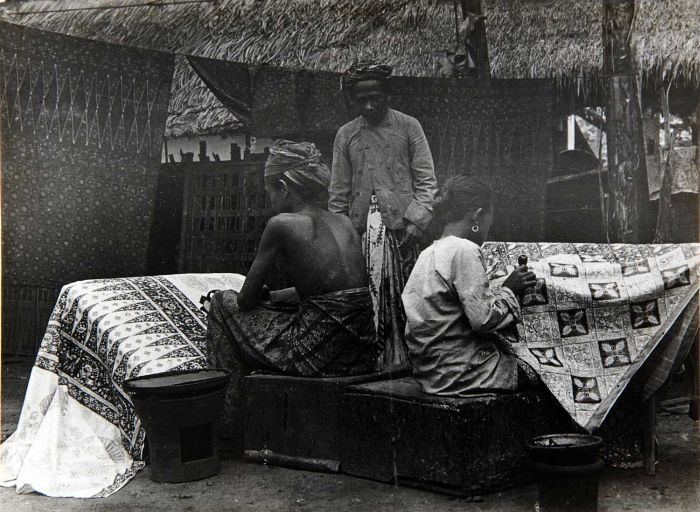
Daily batik industry life in Java c. 1900

Canting is originated in Java and invented by the Javanese, it is believed to be invented since c. 12th century. G. P. Rouffaer reported that the gringsing batik pattern was already known by the 12th century in Kediri, East Java. He concluded that this delicate pattern could only be created by the canting, an etching tool that holds a small reservoir of hot wax.

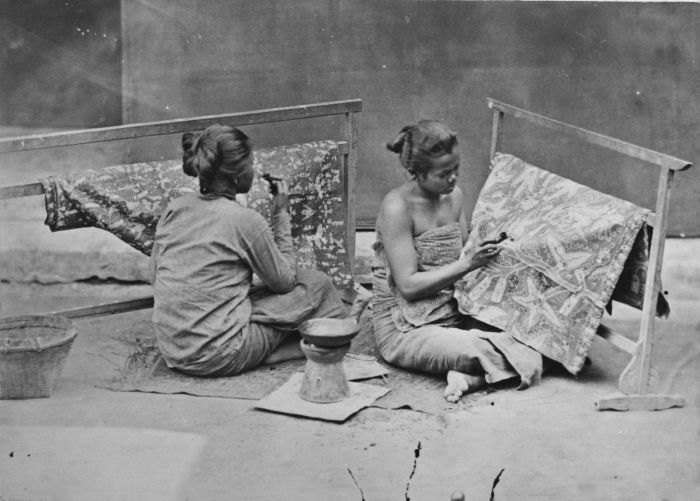
Javanese woman in the middle of batik-making process in Java c. 1870, wax applied using the canting

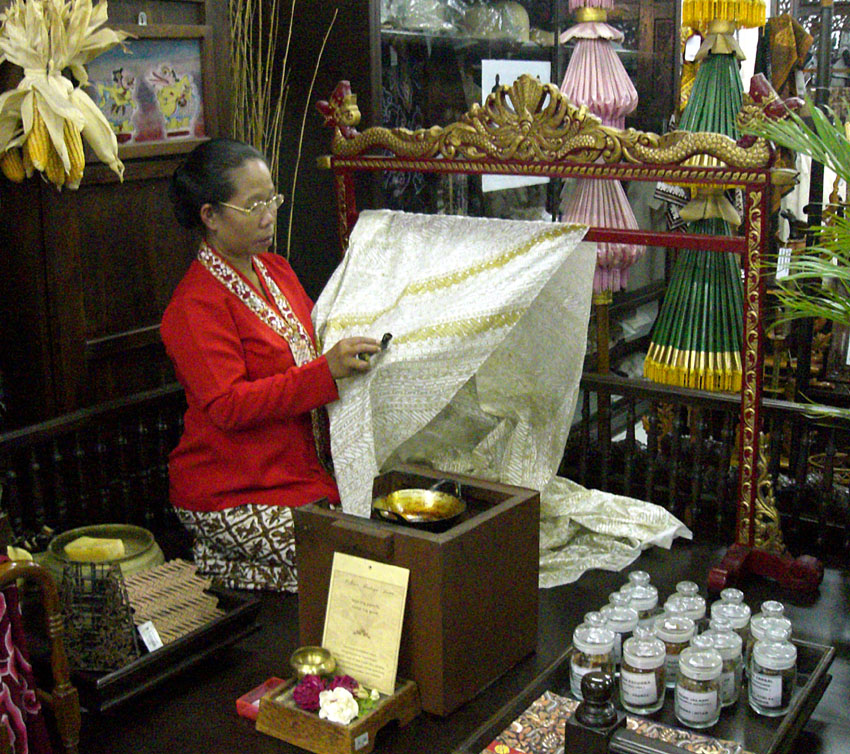
A woman applying malam (liquid wax) following pattern on fabric using canting in arts and craft center at Mirota, Yogyakarta, Indonesia in 2007

== Design ==
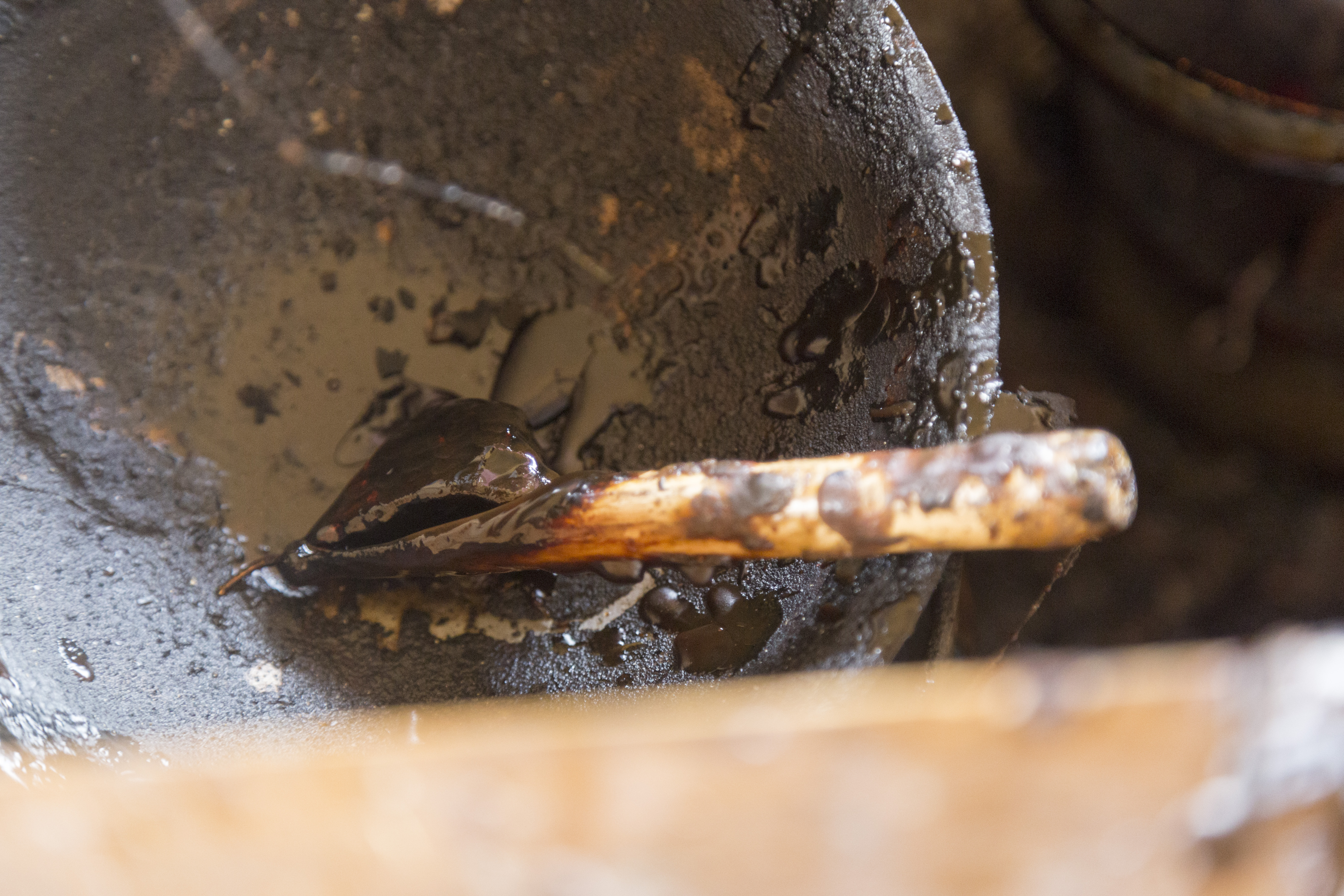
Canting in the wajan malam (wax pan)

A canting consists of:

1. Nyamplung: a rounded liquid wax container, made from copper.
2. Cucuk (IPA:tʃutʃuk): a small copper pipe or spout that connects to nyamplung container, it is where the liquid wax comes out to be applied to the cloth.
3. Gagang: canting holder, usually made from bamboo or wood.

The size of canting may be varied according to the desired dot size or line thickness to be applied to the cloth. A batik craftsperson uses canting in a similar fashion as drawing using a pen.

== Types ==
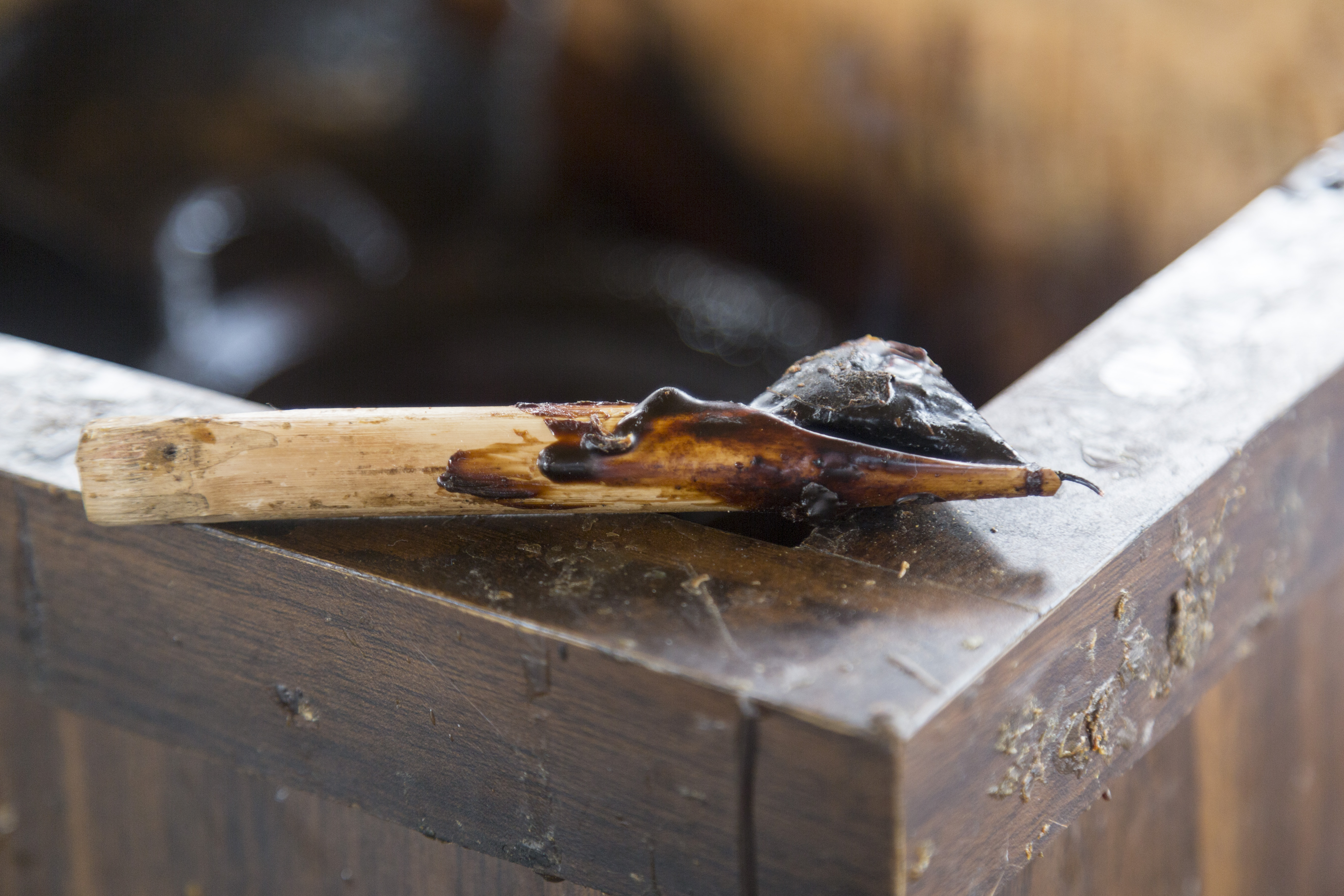
The common canting used in batik-making process

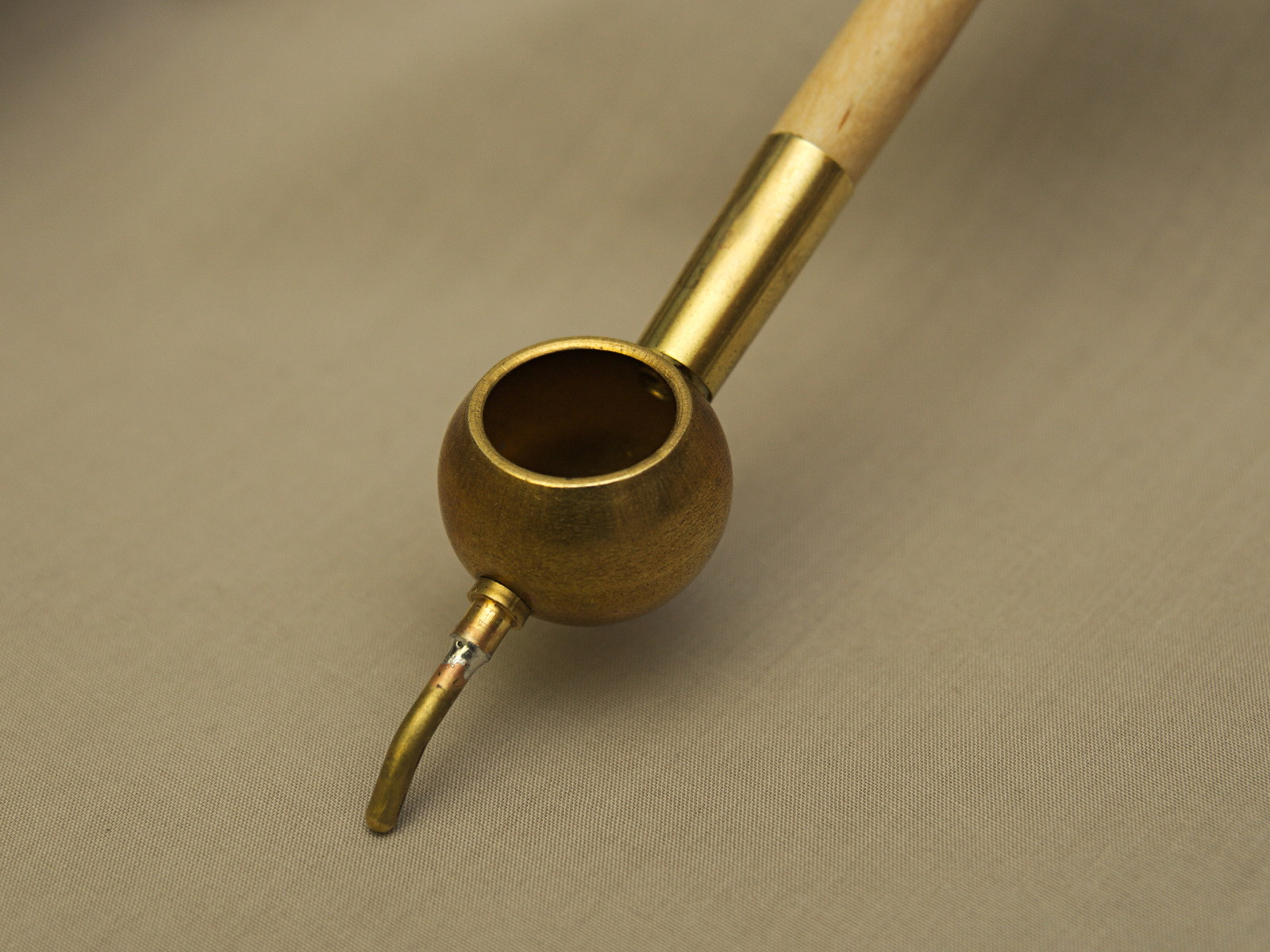
Brass canting

There are three ways of classifying the types of canting:

1. Based on its function:
  1. Canting Rengrengan: canting that is ideally used to make a batik pattern for the first time.
  2. Canting Isen: canting that is ideally used to fill a pattern that has been made beforehand.
2. Based on the diameter of its cucuk:
  1. Small Canting: canting that has a small-sized cucuk with a diameter of less than 1 millimeter and is usually used as Canting Isen.
  2. Medium Canting: canting that has a medium-sized cucuk with a diameter of 1 – 2.5 millimeters and is usually used as Canting Rengrengan.
  3. Large Canting: canting with a large-sized cucuk with a diameter of more than 2.5 millimeters and is usually used to make a larger batik pattern or to fill a pattern that has been made beforehand with a block of wax.
3. Based on the number of its cucuk:
  1. Canting Cecekan: canting with one cucuk.
  2. Canting Laron/Loron: canting with two cucuk.
  3. Canting Telon: canting with three cucuk that forms an equilateral triangle.
  4. Canting Prapatan: canting with four cucuk that forms a square.
  5. Canting Liman: canting with five cucuk that forms a square with a dot in the center of the square.
  6. Canting Byok: canting with an odd number of cucuk and is equal to or more than seven cucuk that forms a circle with a dot in the center of the circle.
  7. Canting Renteng/Galaran: canting with four or six cucuk that forms two parallel lines.

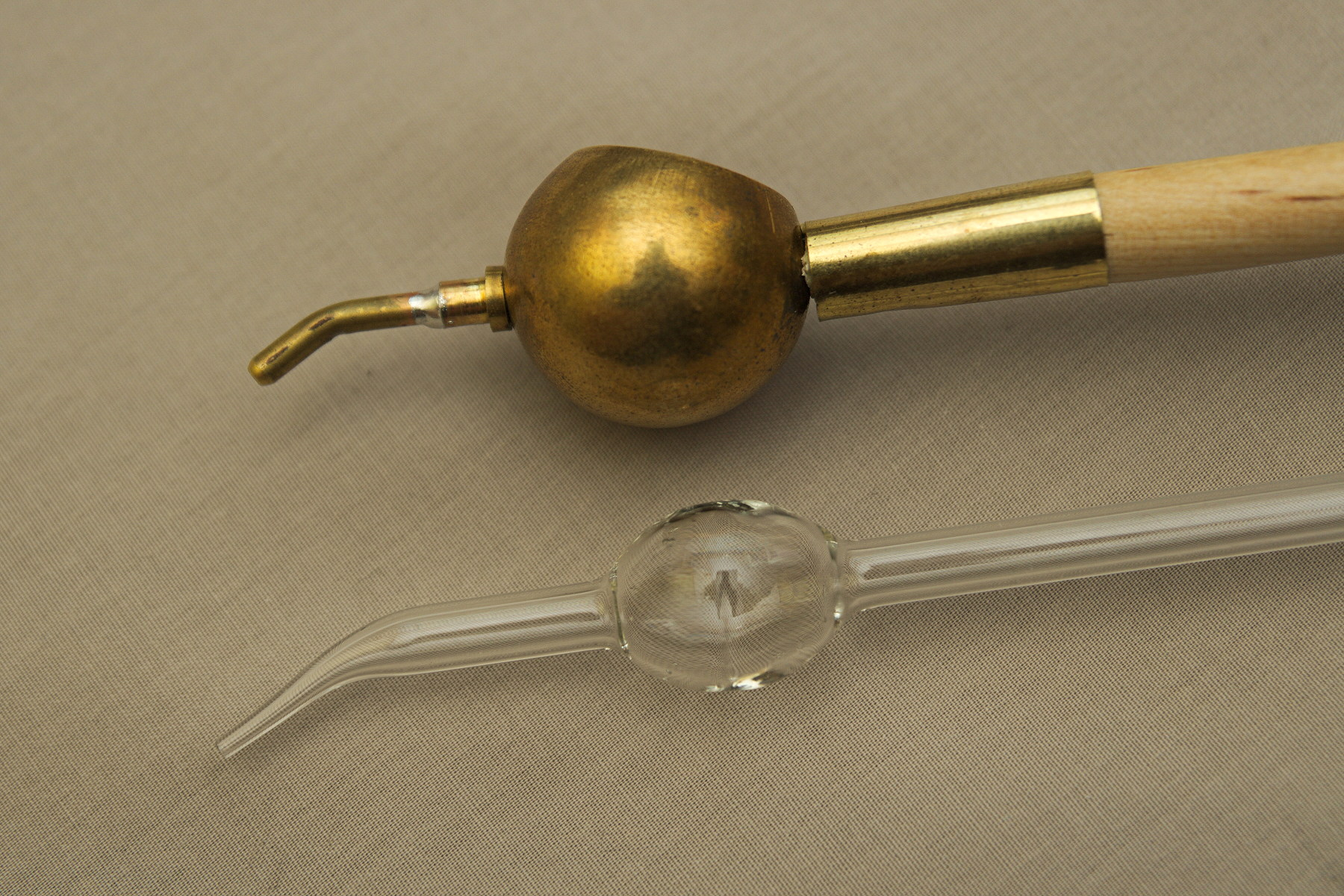
Brass and glass cantings

== Technique ==
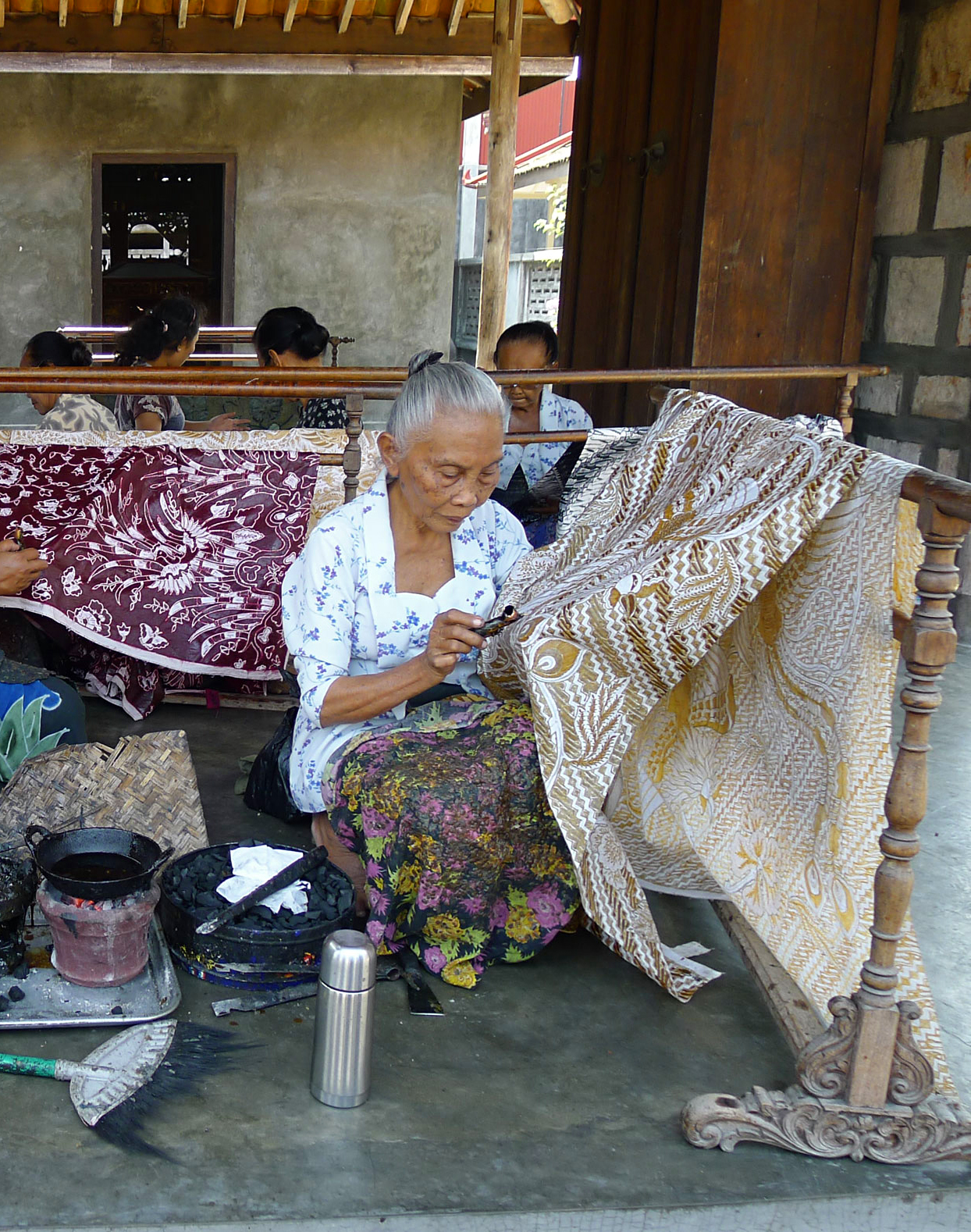
Batik craftswomen in Java drawing intricate patterns using canting and wax kept hot in a small heated pan

Firstly, the cloth must be washed, soaked and beaten with a large mallet. The hot and liquid wax is scooped from small wajan (wok) heated upon small stove. The batik craftsperson sometimes blow the spout tip of canting to allow the liquid wax to flow smoothly and to avoid clogging, then they draw the line or dot upon the cloth, applying the liquid wax, following the patterns and images that previously had been drawn using pencil. A pattern is then drawn with hot wax called malam using canting. The wax functions as a dye-resist. After this, the cloth is dipped in a dye bath containing the first colour. After the cloth is dry, the wax is removed by scraping or boiling the cloth. This process is repeated as many times as the number of colours desired. For larger areas of cloth which need to be covered, the wax is applied using a tool called nemboki/mopoki.

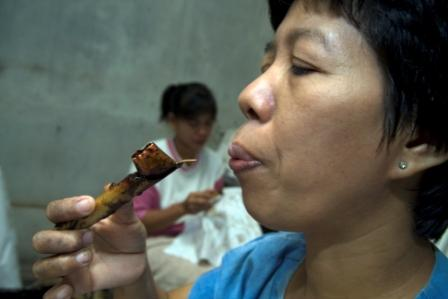
Batik craftswoman in Indonesia blowing a canting to avoid the wax clogging the pipe

== See also ==
- Batik
- Indonesian culture
