= Raven Tao =

New Zealand-born Hong Kong model and entrepreneur

Lady Raven Tao
- Born: 陶明鶯; 11 November; New Zealand
- Other names: Lady Allom; Raven Hanson (former)
- Citizenship: New Zealander, British
- Occupations: Top model Television host Actress; Radio producer & DJ; Fashion designer
- Spouse: Chevalier Allom
- Modeling information
- Height: 1.73 m (5 ft 8 in)
- Hair color: Dark brown
- Eye color: Brown
- Website: www.raventao.com

Raven Tao, (titled Lady Allom) is a Eurasian model, media personality and entrepreneur based in Hong Kong.

== Career ==
Tao modelled prolifically across Asia in her teens, a cover girl of Harpers Bazaar and other publications.

She starred as the face of international advertising campaigns for Sprite, Escada Laurel, Biore, Sunsilk, Samsung, Ferrero Rocher, Kodak, Honda, Chow Sang Sang, Citroën, Apex Beauty, Haier, Qui Mei, Claire TV, MW-Giorgio Fedon and numerous other global brands.

Tao starred in multiple international campaigns for Vidal Sassoon and Olay, and a semi-global campaign for Olay Total Effects.

Tao's media presenter roles include TV, onstage, radio and celebrity interviews.

She hosted Rockit Hong Kong Music Festival 2004–2006, was radio DJ & producer for MediaCorp Singapore's Top 40 radio station 987fm in 2007, and presented on AXN and HBO Singapore.

Tao hosted on Fox Movies Premium and Channel V International's SPLASH Vol. 7, 8 and 9. She emceed the W Hong Kong 5th Anniversary global broadcast event in 2013, the 2014 Star World series Tokyo Luxe and was an ambassador for luxury realtors Engel & Voelkers HK in The Apartment 2013.

Tao has acted and cameoed in movies. She filmed with director Yick- Sum Poon on Wong Chi Wai's music video 'Building Bridges, Fixing Roads', and starred in Poon's avant-garde short film on SARS, titled STILL which aired at the Torino Film Festival.

Tao has a guest appearance in acclaimed director Ann Hui's 2010 film, All About Love. and has a leading role in the 2012 movie Reunited in Malaysia (Wiedersehen in Malaysia, as Raven Hanson), where she is dubbed in German.

In 2015 Tao founded Hong Kong's first luxury corsetry brand, Pearls & Arsenic which featured on magazine covers and in multiple seasons of Asia's Next Top Model.

== Background ==
Tao is titled Lady Allom by marriage to financier Chevalier Commandeur Zak Allom.

Her mother is ethnically Chinese-Nepalese and her father is English-Polish. She was raised in Hong Kong, Canada, New Zealand and Australia and studied law.

== Charity ==
Raven Tao has worked with charitable causes including "Bullets For Beauty", which supports local artisans in war torn countries by recycling military ammunition, youth empowerment program "Project Share" and "Liberty Asia", a charity devoted to prevention of human trafficking. Tao is the poster face and an interviewee of the 2017 documentary on women in media, The Beauty Machine.
