= Manying Ip =

Social historian in New Zealand

Manying Ip CNZM FRSNZ FNZAH
- 葉宋曼瑛
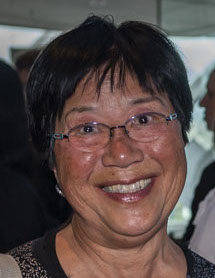
- Ip in November 2020
- Born: 1945 (age 80–81); Guizhou, Republic of China
- Occupation: Social historian
- Title: Emeritus Professor

Academic background
- Thesis: From Qing reformer to twentieth-century publisher : the life and times of Zhang Yuanji 1867–1959

Manying Ip CNZM FRSNZ, (Chinese: 葉宋曼瑛; born 1945), also known as Bess Ip, is a social historian and emeritus professor in Auckland, New Zealand, who has published on the identity of Chinese New Zealanders.

== Early life and education ==
Ip was born in 1945 in Guizhou to parents from Hong Kong who have moved inland to escape the Japanese invasion of Hong Kong. The family returned to Hong Kong during Ip's childhood, where she earned a Bachelor of Arts in honours in History from the University of Hong Kong.

Ip moved to New Zealand in 1974 and attended the University of Auckland, earning a Master of Arts in Chinese History. At the University of Auckland's History Department, she earned a PhD in 1983, with her thesis titled From Qing reformer to twentieth-century publisher: the life and times of Zhang Yuanji 1867–1959.

== Work ==
Ip's PhD thesis was published by Beijing Commercial Press in 1985, and she has continued to study and publish on the Chinese diaspora, especially in relation to the identity of Chinese New Zealanders and New Zealand relationships with Hong Kong, Taiwan and mainland China. Ip was appointed to the Human Rights Commission in 2003. Ip is also a trustee of the Asia New Zealand Foundation Board.

== Awards and honours ==
Ip was awarded a New Zealand Suffrage Centennial Medal in 1993.

In June 1996 Ip was made an Officer of the New Zealand Order of Merit for services to the Chinese community.

Ip was elected a Fellow of the Royal Society Te Apārangi in 2009. She is also a Fellow of the New Zealand Academy of Humanities.

Ip was made a Companion of the New Zealand Order of Merit for services to the Chinese community and education in the New Years Honours for 2018.

== Selected publications ==
- Ye, Manying Bess; Chaplin, Gillian; China Wen hua bu; Auckland City Art Gallery; NZI Corporation (1986). The Buried army of Qin Shihuang: an NZI Corporation/Auckland City Art Gallery Exhibition (in undetermined language). Auckland Art Gallery. ISBN 978-0-86463-147-3. OCLC 36998915. OL 45721277M. Wikidata Q104986712.
- Ye, Manying Bess (1997). "Unlikely Friends: Hu Shih and Chang Yuan-chi". Chinese Studies in History. 31 (1): 55–85. doi:10.2753/csh0009-4633310155. Wikidata Q58570594.
- Ye, Manying Bess; Australian National University; Centre for the Study of the Chinese Southern Diaspora (2001). Re-examining Chinese transnationalism in Australia-New Zealand. ISBN 978-1-74076-009-6. OCLC 57611771. OL 20119798M. Wikidata Q104986705.
- Ye, Manying Bess (2003). Unfolding history, evolving identity: the Chinese in New Zealand. ISBN 978-1-86940-289-1. LCCN 2004380372. OCLC 469532527. OL 3353518M. Wikidata Q104986706.
- Ye, Manying Bess; Murphy, Nigel (2005), Aliens at my table: Asians as New Zealanders see them, Penguin Books, OCLC 568963745, Wikidata Q104986708
- Ye, Manying Bess (2008). Being Maori-Chinese: Mixed Identities. Auckland: Auckland University Press. ISBN 978-1-86940-399-7. LCCN 2008399913. OCLC 262787596. OL 12067427M. Wikidata Q104986707. Reprinted in 2013.
