= New Zealand Chinese Growers Monthly Journal =

New Zealand Chinese journal

New Zealand Chinese Growers' Monthly Journal
- Type: Monthly
- Owner: Dominion Federation of New Zealand Chinese Commercial Growers Inc.
- Editor: Dan Chan, Charlie Shek, Lionel Chan
- Founded: 1949
- Headquarters: Wellington, New Zealand
- Circulation: 700 monthly

The New Zealand Chinese Growers' Monthly Journal (Chinese: 僑農月刊) was a Chinese-language New Zealand periodical published from 1949 to 1972 by the Dominion Federation of New Zealand Chinese Commercial Growers Incorporated to provide growers with information on farming, modern methods of cultivation and the use of machinery. It was the longest-running Chinese language publication in New Zealand. Its printing type is New Zealand's only surviving set in the Chinese language.

== History ==
During the early 20th century, many Chinese families worked across New Zealand as market gardeners and produce sellers. In 1943, prime minister Peter Fraser asked these growers to supply vegetables to New Zealand and American troops in the Pacific as part of the war effort, and the New Zealand Chinese Growers' Association was formed to coordinate this work. It published a precursor of the journal as a single Chinese page in a 1945 issue of the New Zealand Commercial Gardeners' Journal, the country's mainstream growers' publication.

In July 1949, the association, now called the Dominion Federation of New Zealand Chinese Commercial Growers Incorporated, published the first standalone issue of the journal. In its early years the journal carried both market news (including trade information, cultivation techniques, and translations of government regulations affecting the industry) and also current events, community member profiles, and opinion pieces. Although it began to include some articles and advertisements in English as its distribution grew, in the early 1950s it also ran Chinese lessons centred on market gardening.

During the Cold War, the New Zealand government found that the journal contained more political and overseas items than articles on agriculture. In keeping with the government's policy of assimilation, the Minister of Agriculture wrote a letter to the journal in 1960 insisting it stop publishing on foreign current affairs and instead focus on New Zealand issues. Accordingly, the journal refocused on matters related to agriculture, Chinese business and community events, and New Zealand news, and began to feature a great number of literary pieces.

At the journal's peak, it posted 700 copies of each issue to members. However, by the late 1960s, the fact that the journal continued to lose money raised calls to wind it up. The last issue was published in August 1972.

== Printing type ==
For its first three years, the journal was hand-written then copied to a cyclostyle. In August 1952, it began to be published on an offset printing press using lead types imported from Universal Type Foundry in Hong Kong at a cost of £4,000. Type was set by hand in the Federation's offices and later in the editor's house in Wellington, then driven to the printers – originally in Masterton.

The type included nine font variations, including three Chinese character typefaces. Regular script appeared most commonly, as headline and body copy. Imitation Song referenced woodblock printing and books produced during the Song dynasty, while a special variation called Cheung Fong Sung (長仿宋) was used for subtitles. This last was a rare condensed style and was long and skinny while the other two were perfectly square.

In October 1972, after the journal was wound up, the lead types and press equipment were transported to a market garden shed belonging to Ron Waishing, a committee member of the Federation Executive. They were rediscovered around 2007 still in working condition and with some of the type still laid out as it was to print the journal's final issue.

The press was repatriated to Wellington and on 15 September 2016 an agreement between Victoria University of Wellington and the Dominion Federation of New Zealand Chinese Commercial Growers signed an agreement and launched the Chinese Growers Printing Collection under the guardianship of Victoria University of Wellington's Wai-te-ata Press. The full collection is estimated to contain over 300,000 pieces of type. It is New Zealand's only surviving set of original Chinese printing type, and is used for community-based research as well to print limited edition books and posters.

== Editors ==
1. Dan Chan (陳中岳 Chan Chung Yock)
2. Charlie Shek (石松 Shek Chong)
3. Lionel Chan (陳賴洪 Chan Lai Hung)
