= Renee Liang =

New Zealand paediatrician, poet, playwright and librettist

Renee Liang MNZM
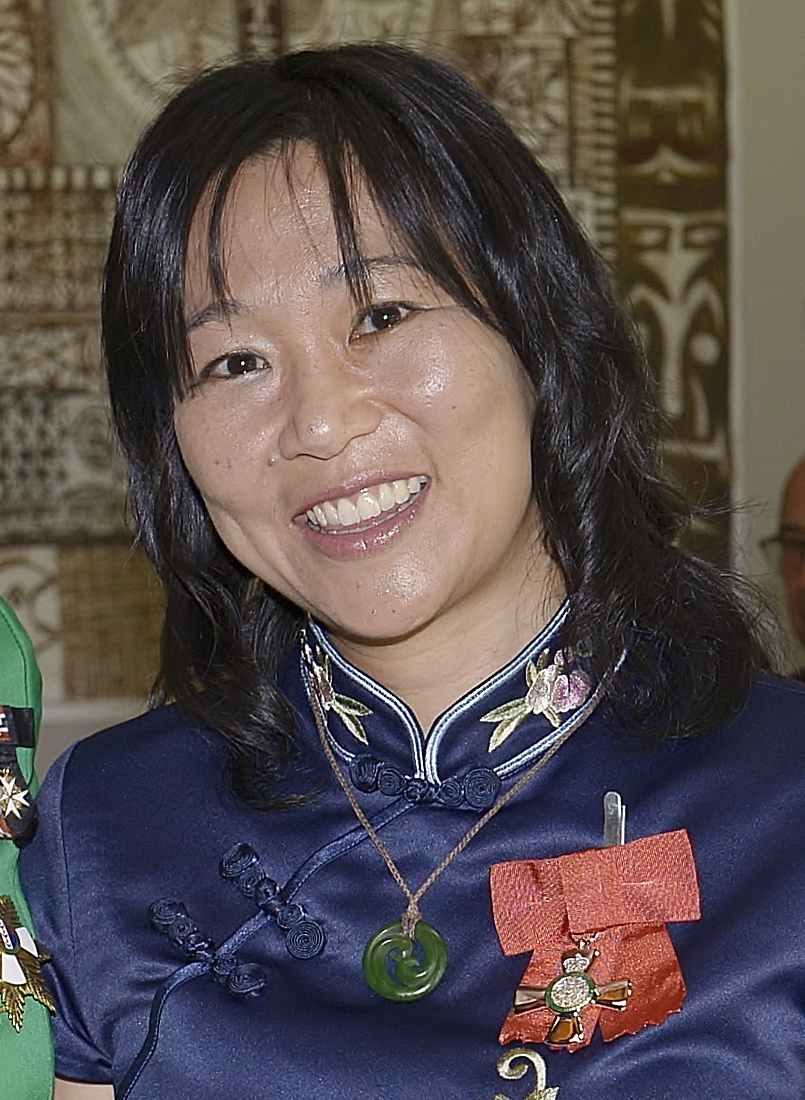
- Liang in 2018
- Born: Renee Wen-Wei Liang; 1973 (age 52–53); New Zealand
- Occupation: Writer

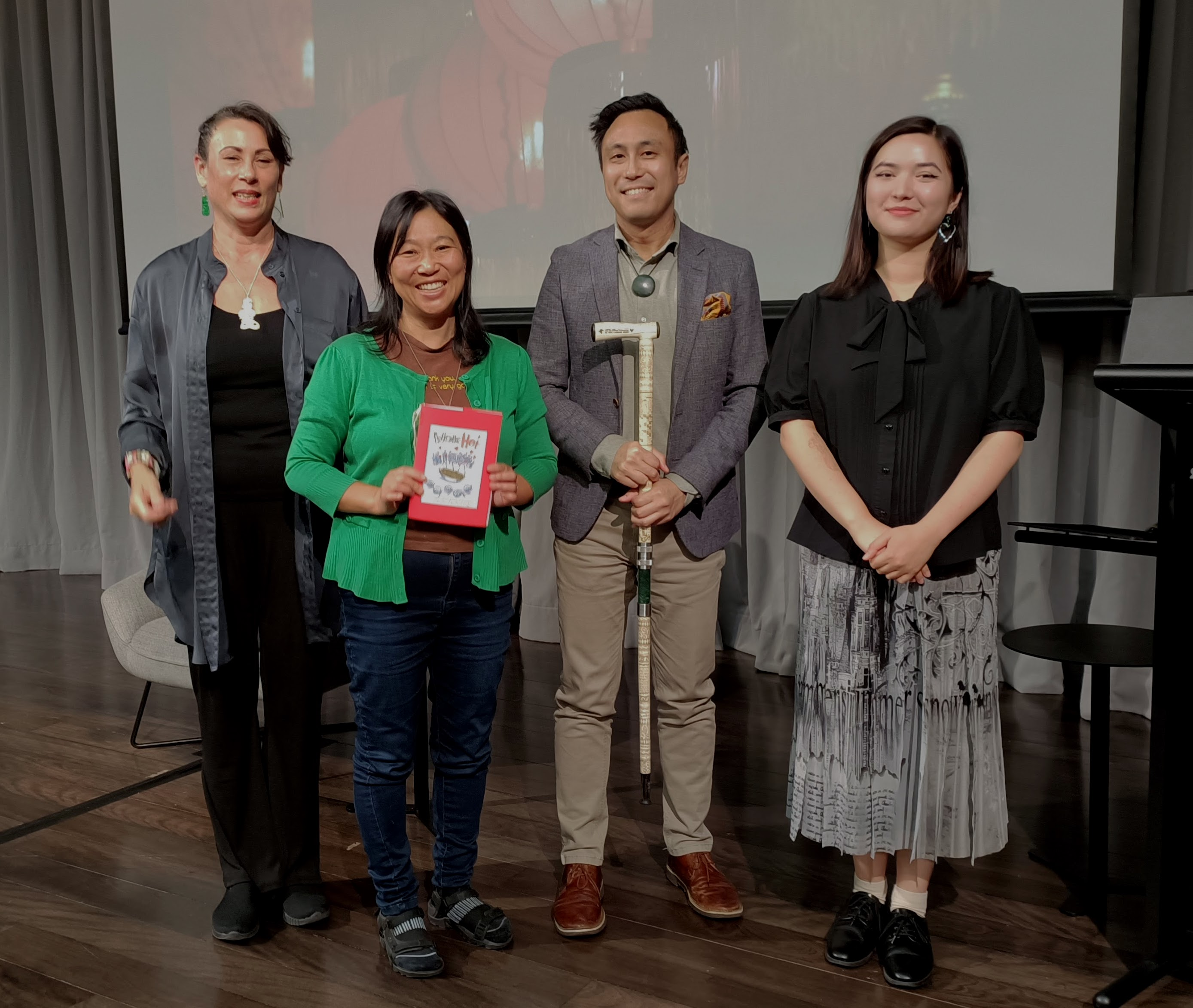
L to R: Lynda Chanwai-Earle, Renee Laing, Chris Tse, Cadence Chung at "Lunar New Year celebration: Big pao meets poetry" National Library of New Zealand

Renee Wen-Wei Liang MNZM (born 1973) is a New Zealand paediatrician, poet, essayist, short story writer, playwright, librettist, theatre producer and medical researcher. She has been the recipient of several awards for her services to arts, science and medicine and is also noted for her services to the Chinese New Zealand community. She lives in Auckland.

== Biography ==
Liang was born in 1973. She is a second-generation Chinese New Zealander and has two younger sisters, Rhea (a surgeon) and Roseanne (a filmmaker).

She attended St Cuthbert's College and graduated from the University of Auckland with a Bachelor of Medicine, Bachelor of Surgery degree in 1996, a Master of Creative Writing degree in 2007 and a Postgraduate Diploma of Arts (Theatre) in 2009. She also holds a specialist qualification as a Fellow of the Royal Australasian College of Physicians.

She has toured eight plays to festivals and venues nationally. Her poetry and short stories have been published in both New Zealand and overseas journals and websites such as New Zealand Listener, JAAM, Blackmail Press, Tongue in your Ear, Sidestream and Magazine. Liang's play The Bone Feeder was commissioned as an opera through Carla Van Zon, and performed as an opera on 23 March 2017 at the Auckland Arts Festival. Her Interactive digital narrative work Golden Threads was created in partnership with illustrator Allan Xia as part of Auckland Museum's 2017 exhibition "Being Chinese in Aotearoa: A photographic journey".

She has also run many community writing workshops, including a programme for migrant women called New Kiwi Women Write Their Stories, and from these has produced a number of anthologies of migrant women’s writing. The Kitchen is a writing workshop based around sharing stories in local neighbourhoods.

As a paediatrician, she has a special interest in child health and adolescent health and leads the Asian Advisory Group for the longitudinal project Growing Up In New Zealand.

Liang lives in Auckland.

== Honours and awards ==
Liang's play The Quiet Room was shortlisted for the Adam NZ Play Award in 2014; it also won the teen section of Playmarket’s Plays for the Young in 2014 and the NZ Writers Guild SWANZ (Script Writer Awards New Zealand) Award for Best Play in 2016. Under the Same Moon was a finalist in the SWANZ Best Play Awards in 2015. Golden Threads won the Play by Play Award for Diversity in 2017.

In 2010, Liang was the recipient of the Sir Peter Blake Emerging Leader Award for her achievements in arts, science and medicine. In 2012, she won the non-fiction category of the Royal Society Manhire Prize in Science Writing for Creative Non-Fiction with her piece Epigenetics: navigating our inner seas.

She received the NZ Chinese Society (Auckland Branch) Senior Achievement award in 2012 and won the Arts and Culture category of the NEXT Woman of the Year Awards in 2018.

She was a recipient of the D’Arcy Writers Grant in 2018 and her resulting essay, A Kete Half Empty, was published in North & South in January 2020.

In the 2018 New Year Honours, Liang was appointed a Member of the New Zealand Order of Merit, for services to the arts.

== Published works ==
Poetry

- Chinglish (Soapbox Press, 2008)
- Banana (Monster Fish Publishing, 2008)
- Cardiac Cycle, illustrated by Cat Auburn (Monster Fish Publishing, 2008)
- Towards the Cyclone (Monster Fish Publishing, 2010)

Plays, operas and musicals

- First Asian AB
- Lantern (2009)
- The Bone Feeder (2010) a play and an opera
- The Quiet Room (2013)
- Under the Same Moon (2015)
- Dominion Road the Musical with music composed by Jun Bin Lee (2017)
- The Bone Feeder: adapted as an opera with music composed by Gareth Farr (2017)
- Sofija's Garden (2019)

Digital

- Golden Threads (2017)

Non-fiction

- When We Remember To Breathe: Mess, Magic and Mothering with Michele Powles (Magpie Pulp, 2019)

As editor

- New beginnings: new Kiwi women write their stories (Monster Fish Publishing, 2012)
- New flights: writing from Kiwi migrant women (Monster Fish Publishing, 2015)
