= New Zealand head tax =

Historical poll tax on Chinese immigrants to New Zealand

New Zealand imposed a poll tax on Chinese immigrants during the 19th and early 20th centuries. The poll tax was effectively lifted in the 1930s following the invasion of China by Japan, and was finally repealed in 1944. Following efforts to recognise its impact, an apology for the tax was issued in English and Mandarin under Prime Minister Helen Clark in 2002, and was later delivered in Cantonese in 2023.

== History ==
Although Chinese immigrants were invited to New Zealand by the Dunedin Chamber of Commerce, prejudice against them quickly led to calls for restrictions on immigration. Following the example of anti-Chinese poll taxes enacted by California in 1852 and by Australian states in the 1850s, 1860s and 1870s, John Hall's government passed the Chinese Immigration Act 1881. This imposed a £10 tax per Chinese person entering New Zealand, and permitted only one Chinese immigrant for every 10 tons of cargo. Richard Seddon's government increased the tax to £100 per head in 1896 and tightened the other restriction to only one Chinese immigrant for every 200 tons of cargo.

The poll tax was waived in 1934 by the Minister of Customs, following Imperial Japan's invasion of Manchuria, and the Act was finally repealed in 1944.

== Impact of the head tax ==
By 1930, an estimated 4500 people paid the poll tax, raising over £300,000 (worth about NZ$47 million in 2022).

== Compensation and apologies ==
As compensation, the government spent NZ$5 million in 2005 to establish a Chinese Poll Tax Heritage Trust to sponsor events that promotes:

- learning and use of the Cantonese language
- awareness and understanding of the history of Chinese in New Zealand
- the recording and preserving of Chinese New Zealand history
- greater public understanding of ethnic diversity with particular emphasis on the contributions of Chinese New Zealanders
- Chinese arts and culture (including Chinese New Zealand creative and cultural expression).

People who paid the poll tax were not personally compensated.

After years of activism, on 12 February 2002, Prime Minister at the time Helen Clark offered New Zealand's Chinese community an official apology for the poll tax. However, the choice to deliver the apology in English and Mandarin (the latter being translated by interpreter Henry Liu) was criticised for omitting Cantonese, the language that had been spoken by most Chinese immigrants at the time of the tax and a major language in Chinese New Zealander communities. The apology was re-issued in Cantonese by Liu on 13 February 2023 during a parliamentary Chinese New Year function, which was followed by poet laurate Chris Tse reading a poem about the journey of his great-grandfather to New Zealand, who had been made to pay the tax.

== See also ==
- Lost Years: A People's Struggle for Justice (2011)
- Chinese New Zealander
- Sinophobia
- White Australia policy (1901-1973)
- Chinese Exclusion Act in United States
- Chinese head tax in Canada (1885-1923)
- Chinese Immigration Act, 1923 in Canada
- Chinese Immigration Act of 1885 in Canada
- Chinese head tax (Newfoundland) (1906–1949)
