= Liantang, Gaoyao =

Coordinates: 22.95172°N 112.45967°E

Liantang 莲塘镇
- Town

Chinese transcription(s)
- Interactive map of Liantang
- Country: China
- Province: Guangdong
- Prefecture-level city: Zhaoqing
- County-level city: Gaoyao
- Time zone: UTC+8 (China Standard Time)

Liantang (Chinese: 莲塘镇) is a town in Zhaoqing, Guangdong province, China.

Liantang was the birthplace of Tsang Tsou Choi.

== See also ==
- List of township-level divisions of Guangdong
