= Fairchild TV News =

News division of Fairchild TV in Canada

- 新聞報道
- Genre: News
- Country of origin: Canada
- Original languages: Cantonese; Mandarin (1993-1998; Vancouver) (1993-2001; Toronto)

Production
- Production locations: Western; National (2018-2020, 2022-present); Vancouver, British Columbia (1993-2006); Aberdeen Centre, Richmond, British Columbia (2006-present); Eastern; National (2001-2017, 2020-2022); Richmond Hill, Ontario (1993-2017, 2020-2022)
- Running time: 65 Minutes (Weekdays); 40 Minutes (Weekends)

Original release
- Network: Fairchild TV
- Release: National Feed; July 2, 2001 – present
- Release: Western Canada Late News; June 23, 2003 – October 1, 2004
- Release: Mandarin (Toronto); December 23, 1993 – September 30, 2001
- Release: Split Feed; December 23, 1993 – July 1, 2001
- Release: Mandarin (Vancouver); December 23, 1993 – May 31, 1998

Fairchild TV News is the news division of Fairchild TV, a Cantonese cable television network in Canada. It competes against the Cantonese Omni News broadcasts aired by Rogers' Omni Television stations. Since 2017, Fairchild has produced the Chinese-language newscasts aired by Omni.

== Operations ==
Fairchild TV produces one hour-long newscast every day. It airs at 7:00 pm local time in both Vancouver and Toronto.

From 7:00 pm to 7:30 pm, audiences in each market receives its own appropriate edition. Domestic and international news items are covered (with the items often shared between the two editions). Local news items are tailored specifically for each edition so the coverage is relevant to its local audience (i.e. local news items from Toronto will seldom appear on the Vancouver edition, and vice versa).

Due to Toronto being 3 hours ahead of Vancouver and such, their newscast being broadcast first, from 7:30 pm to 8:05 pm, the non-local newscast segments are reported in Toronto and repeated in Vancouver. This section of the newscast covers news items from the Greater China region (China, Hong Kong and Taiwan), lifestyle and feature reports, business news, sports and weather.

Fairchild TV does have several reporters based in both cities to cover local news. However, most local and national/international news footages are usually sourced from the mainstream networks (in general Global TV for the former, and Canadian Broadcasting Corporation for the latter), with footages from the Greater China region provided by China Central Television (CCTV) in mainland China, TVB and Now TV in Hong Kong, and various sources in Taiwan.

The nightly newscast is repeated at 11:30 pm & 6:00 am local time.

The newscast goes from 7:00pm to 7:40pm on Weekends.

Fairchild TV does not have a designated anchor for its newscast. Instead, its anchor lineup varies from night to night, as was the usual practice at television stations in Hong Kong. (Hong Kong's TVB currently assigns shifts to its anchors on an approximately monthly basis).

In 2017, Rogers Communications subcontracted Fairchild to produce the relaunched Cantonese and Mandarin-language Omni News programs for Omni Television; the newscasts are produced under the direction and editorial control of Rogers.

== History ==
=== Until 2001 ===
Prior to 2001, Fairchild's Vancouver and Toronto operations were separate. The station operated as two separate feeds, one for each city, and the two feeds often had slightly different schedules from each other.

Each feed also had its own completely separate newscast, produced at its own facility. Viewers in Toronto never saw an anchor from Vancouver, and vice versa. The newscast originally aired at 8:00 p.m. local time, then moved to 7:30 pm local time in 1999, and presented by only one anchor. Each feed also had its own local weather segment, which was aired immediately after the newscast as a separate programme in and of itself.

=== 2001-2004 ===
However, this split-feed arrangement breached the station's Canadian Radio-television and Telecommunications Commission (CRTC) licensing conditions. As such, Fairchild TV was forced to merge the two feeds back into a single national feed on July 2, 2001. Vancouver viewers now received exactly the same feed (other than local commercials) as those in Toronto, only on a three-hour delay due to time difference.

Under the single national feed, initially the bulk of the newscast was produced in Toronto, with only a brief segment produced in Vancouver consisting of regional items from Western Canada (primarily from Metro Vancouver itself). The weather forecast was also completely produced in Toronto. Gradually, Vancouver's production team received more airtime, as it took over production of the Greater China news segment.

Not only did the Vancouver newsroom receive less airtime overall; it was also unable to cover local news effectively. The Vancouver newsroom had been heavily dependent on Global BC for local news footages, and prior to the changeover, it routinely taped footages off Global BC's 6:00 p.m. newscast to air on its own bulletin. However, under the single national feed, the Vancouver newsroom had to link up with Toronto at 4:30 p.m. Pacific in order to meet the 7:30 pm Eastern deadline for the newscast. As such, the Vancouver newsroom now had to tape Global BC's noon or even morning newscast instead (which often carried items from the previous day), resulting in Vancouver news items often being shown on a one-day delay.

To partly remedy this problem, the station launched a 11:00 p.m. newscast, titled Western Canada Late News (加西晚間新聞) on June 23, 2003. This gave the Vancouver newsroom another opportunity to link up at 8:00 p.m. PT for a 11:00 p.m. ET deadline, and allowed it to use footages from Global BC's 6:00 p.m. newscast. Western Canada Late News was completely produced at the Vancouver studio.

The main evening newscast's starting time was moved up from 7:30 p.m. to 7:00 p.m. local time on June 23, 2003. In conjunction with the schedule change, the Vancouver operation debuted a new open studio, with a view of the newsroom behind the anchors.

=== Since 2004 ===
The shortcomings of this national setup were apparent to Fairchild, which petitioned to the CRTC to amend its licensing conditions. The request was granted, and Fairchild revamped its news production on October 4th, 2004. (Details of the revamped newscast have been discussed in the “Operations” section.)

Since the Vancouver newsroom now had more airtime and no longer had to run any items on a one-day delay, “Western Canada Late News” was promptly cancelled after October 1st, 2004.

In early 2006, the entire Vancouver studio was relocated to the third floor of Richmond's Aberdeen Centre (a shopping mall owned by the Fairchild Group), and a new newsroom studio was opened. Visitors of Aberdeen Centre were able to watch the studio production of newscast through the windows until the introduction of a virtual studio in August 2019.

=== Format ===
Until July 2, 2001, each feed's newscast was presented by a solo anchor, who was not seen at all on the other feed. After the single feed went into effect in July 2001, most of the newscast is presented by a Toronto-based anchor, with a Vancouver-based anchor presenting a brief segment of Western Canadian news.

On June 23, 2003, in conjunction with the move to a 7:00 p.m. starting time, the evening newscast also became completely duo-anchored, with two anchors based in Toronto and another two in Vancouver. With the introduction of the duo-anchor format also came "happy talk", involving the two co-anchors exchanging supposedly casual conversations. Initially the bantering was at times rather forced and awkward; however, the conversations now sound more natural, as the anchors have apparently become more accustomed to this format. The "happy talk" format was further supplemented with the addition of a Toronto-based sports anchor in October 2004.

For its entire existence, Western Canada Late News was solo-anchored.

Between October 4, 2004, to December 31, 2017, sports reporting was presented in the Toronto newsroom with an alternating sports anchor.

Due to Fairchild subcontracting OMNI's Chinese newscast in Toronto, the newscast was converted into a multi-market content (MMC) on January 1, 2018. This resulted in Toronto's newscast being entirely anchored out of the Vancouver newsroom. The newsroom also took over production of Greater China news segment, finance, and sports, while Toronto retained sports reporting, photo-tips, stock market exchange, and weather report in the second half. This resulted in the same anchors having to anchor newscasts that applied to local viewers.

The introduction of a virtual studio on August 12, 2019, led to changes in the order of segments during the newscast. The weather report is showcased at the end instead of before the finance segment. Additionally, the finance segment is aired before the photo tips segment rather than after, and the sports segment is now shown after the Greater China news segment instead of at the end of the newscast on weekdays.

After the COVID-19 pandemic in Canada began, the newscast has been reduced to a solo anchor and remains to this day.

During the COVID-19 pandemic in Canada, Toronto's newscast was reverted to being locally produced on March 29, 2020.

Since May 2, 2022, Toronto's newscast has been reverted to MMC with the Vancouver newsroom now presenting the weather report.

Eventually, Vancouver's newscast became taped before the scheduled airtime. The anchor presents local news segments during the first half of the newscast. National and international news segments are typically tailored for Toronto viewers and are then tape delayed for Vancouver viewers. With exceptions of, special news reports, coverage of municipal and provincial elections in British Columbia and Ontario, as well as federal elections, are aired at 11:30 pm local time. Occasionally, a different anchor was featured in Vancouver newscasts until it was scrapped in November 2025.

There is no specific weather or business presenter as the task is completed by the anchor.

== Current Affairs programming ==
Along with its nightly newscast, Fairchild TV News also produces programming pertaining to current and public affairs, including:

- Chatting Platform (時事評台) - from Vancouver, every Sundays at 8:10 pm
- Timeline Magazine (時代雜誌) - from Toronto, every Wednesdays at 6:45 pm
- News Talk (時事直擊) - from Vancouver, every Thursdays at 9:50 pm, Fairchild Radio simulcast
- Magazine 26 (26分鐘見證實錄) - from Vancouver, every Fridays at 9:50 pm

== TVB News ==
Instead of producing its own morning or noon newscasts, Fairchild TV airs satellite feeds of newscasts from Hong Kong's TVB during these day parts:

- An overseas edition of TVB's 1 pm newscast is shown twice, at 07:30 and 07:50 local time
- An overseas edition of TVB's newscast from the TVB News Channel is shown once at 8:30 local time
- An overseas edition of TVB's flagship 6:30 pm newscast is shown twice, at 9:00 am and 12:00 pm local time

== News Team ==
News production studios and bureaus are located in Toronto (Richmond Hill, Ontario) and Vancouver (Richmond, British Columbia). Reporters (and camera crew) may travel to remote locations if needed and mostly within Canada. There have been several occasions where reporters have travelled overseas, mainly to Hong Kong.

=== Vancouver (Richmond, BC) Bureau ===
- Hayden Wong (黃誠希), also a reporter for Talentvision TV News, King Maker V Contestant

=== Former Anchors and Reporters ===
- Eric Lee (李潤庭) - former Fairchild TV Vancouver presenter and news anchor. Later presenter for Cable TV Hong Kong's entertainment news channel and TVB's Entertainment News Channel and Scoop.
- Aurelien Ng (吳雲甫) - now with TVB in Hong Kong
- Hon Sang Chan (陳瀚生) - former anchor/Assignment Editor, later MLA for Richmond Centre
- Kit Ching Ho (何潔貞) - anchor; former TVB news anchor; now retired
- Ritch Lau (劉肇麟) - former anchor/reporter, now Markham Ward 2 Councillor
- Stanley So (蘇凌峰) - later anchor and producer with OMNI.2 Toronto; now retired
- Wong Tai Kwan (黃大鈞) - former anchor
