= Stanley So =

Stanley So (traditional Chinese: 蘇凌峰; simplified Chinese: 苏凌峰; pinyin: Sū Língfēng; Jyutping: sou^{1} ling^{4}fung^{1} 1945－) is a Cantonese-speaking television journalist in Canada. He began his broadcasting career in Hong Kong before moving to Toronto, and served in various capacities at Omni Television until his retirement in 2012.

After graduating from the Sir Robert Black College of Education, Stanley So joined Hong Kong's Commercial Television in 1975 as a news reporter and anchor. He joined TVB News in 1978 following the demise of Commercial Television, and regularly presented the station's flagship News at 6:30. Stanley was rated as one of the top three most trusted and popular news anchor in the 80s and 90s, even 5 years after his departure from TVB news.

So left TVB in 1990 and moved to Toronto. He served as the news director for Fairchild TV's Toronto division for a few years, before joining CFMT-TV (now Omni) in 1998 as the anchor and senior editor of the station's Cantonese newscast, as well as the station's public affairs officer. He has also presented a number of documentary segments at Omni.2, and hosted the Cantonese version of CBC's Canada: A People's History. Concurrent with Omni's introduction of national newscasts, he became the chief anchor of Omni News: Cantonese National Edition in 2011, and served in that position until his final newscast on July 26, 2012.

He is involved in volunteer works in the community and is the vice-chair of the board of directors of "Across U-hub", a youth organization serving the Chinese community as well as the other ethnic groups. He is married to Helen Lau with two daughters.
