= Fairchild TV 2 =

- Country: Canada
- Broadcast area: National
- Headquarters: Richmond, British Columbia; Richmond Hill, Ontario

Programming
- Language: Cantonese
- Picture format: 1080i (HDTV)

Ownership
- Owner: Fairchild Group (80%); TVB (20%)
- Sister channels: Fairchild TV 1 Talentvision

History
- Launched: May 23, 2013; 13 years ago
- Former names: Fairchild TV 2 HD (2013–2020)

Links
- Website: Fairchild TV 2 (Chinese); Fairchild TV 2 (English)

Fairchild TV 2 or FTV2 (Traditional Chinese: 新時代電視2台, Simplified Chinese: 新时代电视2台, Pinyin: xinshídàidiànshì èr tái), is a Canadian Cantonese language exempt Category B specialty channel. It is co-owned by majority owner Fairchild Media Group (a subsidiary of the Fairchild Group) and Television Broadcasts Limited which owns 20% of the business. Fairchild TV 2 has studios in Metro Vancouver Regional District (inside Aberdeen Centre in Richmond, British Columbia) and the Greater Toronto Area (Richmond Hill, Ontario). The station broadcasts in high definition.

== History ==
In February 2013, Fairchild Media Group received permission from the Canadian Radio-television and Telecommunications Commission (CRTC) to launch Fairchild TV 2 HD.

On January 30, 2019, the CRTC approved Fairchild TV Ltd's request to convert Fairchild TV 2 from a licensed Category B specialty service to an exempted Cat. B third language service.

On September 1, 2020, the channel was renamed to Fairchild TV 2, removing the “HD” Signage with Fairchild TV 1 and Talentvision being upgraded to HD.

== Programs ==
Fairchild TV 2 broadcasts local Canadian and overseas programming in the Cantonese language. It also serves as an overseas station of Hong Kong television network TVB. Unlike its sister station Fairchild TV 1, TVB programmes on Fairchild TV 2 are not delayed by up to a year and are broadcast a few days after it airs in Hong Kong.

== See also ==
- Fairchild TV News
- Fairchild TV 1
- Talentvision
