= Alice Lin =

Taiwanese model and beauty queen

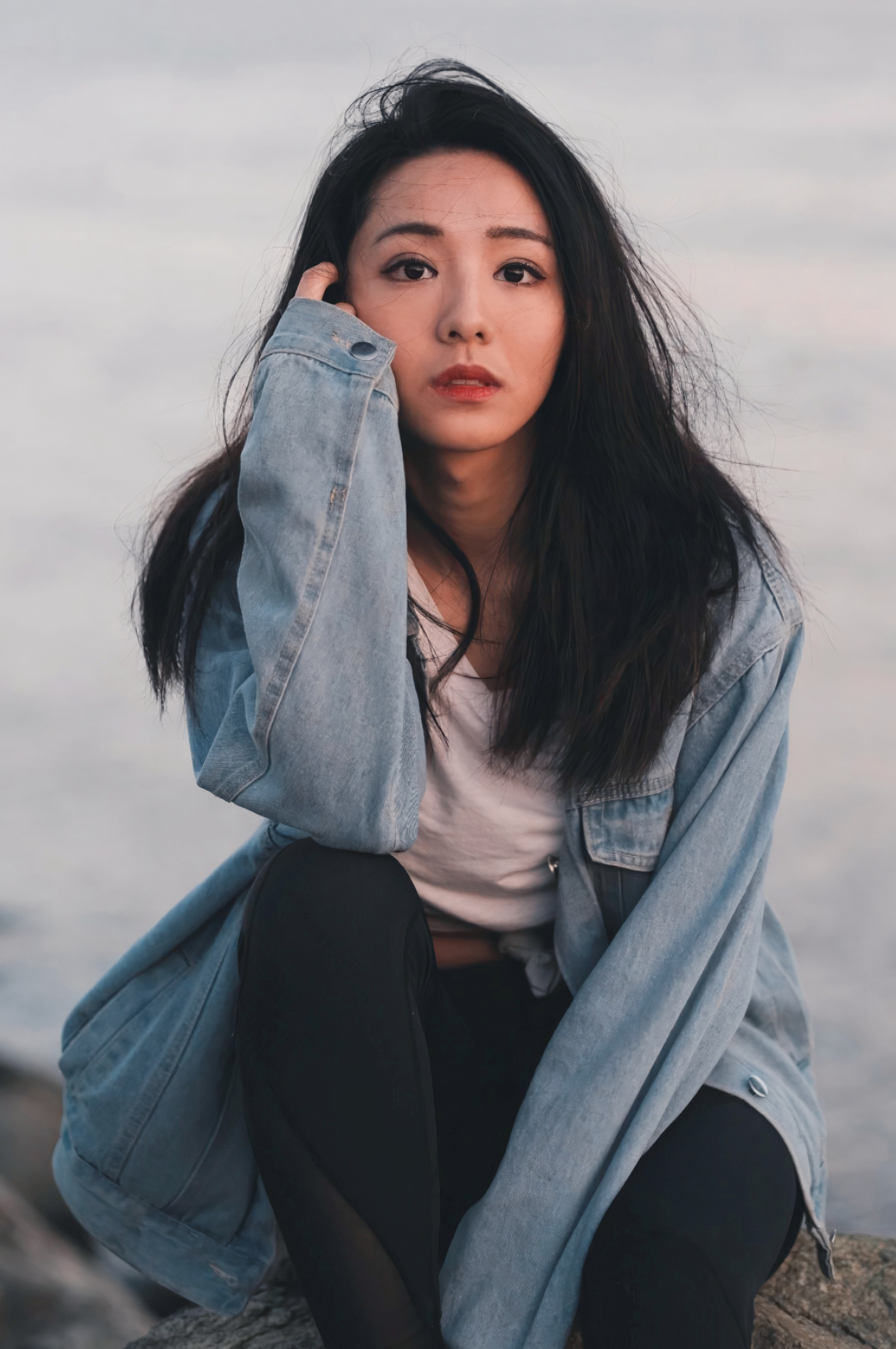
- Born: 13 January 1992 (age 33); Taipei, Taiwan
- Education: Kerrisdale Elementary School; Point Grey Secondary School; Tokyo Foreign Language College; University of British Columbia
- Years active: 2010 –
- Awards: Miss Chinese Vancouver; 2018 Champion; Miss Photogenic; Luk Fook Jewellery Luminous Beauty Award
Alice Lin
- Traditional Chinese: 林昀佳
- Simplified Chinese: 林昀佳
Transcriptions
Standard Mandarin
- Hanyu Pinyin: Lín Yúnjiā
Yue: Cantonese
- Jyutping: Lam^{4} Wan^{4} Gaai^{1}
- Website: Alice Lin's channel on YouTube

Alice Lin (Chinese: 林昀佳; born 13 January 1992) is a Taiwanese model and beauty queen based in Canada. In 2018, she won Miss Chinese Vancouver Pageant and went on to participate in Miss Chinese International Pageant 2019.

== Early life ==
Lin was born in Taipei City, then immigrated to British Columbia when she was 6 years old, living with her parents and two older sisters. She studied at Kerrisdale Elementary School and Point Grey Secondary School. Before graduation from University of British Columbia, she once studied abroad in Tokyo Foreign Language College (Shinjuku), also getting a certificate of JLPT Level N2. She became interested in the performing arts in 2017, when she did a music video for her friend, and decided to transfer to the UBC Department of Theatre & Film.

Lin was crowned Miss Chinese Vancouver Pageant 2018, obtaining Miss Photogenic as well as Lukfook Jewellery Luminous Beauty Award. She represented Vancouver at the Miss Chinese International Pageant 2019 organized by TVB. During the two segments (performance+ Q&A), she didn't showcase herself completely, being knocked out in the Top 10 Semi-Final.

== Career ==
Lin was a streamer of 17 live streaming app, gallery ambassador, commercial model, host and painter prior to winning the Vancouver pageant.

After losing the International Pageant in 2019, she talked to Hong Kong-based online media, HK01 that her aspirations of entering TVB, and thus spending more time to improve Cantonese for the sake of personal development.

== Performance ==
=== TV Programs ===
Year	Title	Notes
Fairchild TV
2018	Miss Chinese Vancouver Pageant 2018	Winner, Miss Photogenic & Luk Fook Jewellery Luminous Beauty Award
TVB
2019	Miss Chinese International Pageant 2019	Top 10 Semi-Finalists

=== Music videos ===
Year	Title	Vocalist
2017	英雄趴	Max Chang

=== Radio programs ===
Year	Title	Notes
CHKG-FM
2018	R&B High Tea	Guest (2018-12-23)

== Awards and nominations ==
Year	Awards	Result
2018	Miss Chinese Vancouver 2018 - Champion	Won
2018	Miss Chinese Vancouver 2018 - Miss Photogenic	Won
2018	Miss Chinese Vancouver 2018 - Luk Fook Jewellery Luminous Beauty Award	Won

Awards and achievements
Miss Chinese Vancouver
Preceded by Cheryl Ng 伍殷嬅	Miss Chinese Vancouver Champion; 2018	Succeeded by Jennifer Packet 宋珍妮
Preceded by Ruby Ng 伍沛盈	Miss Photogenic; 2018	Succeeded by Candice Zhang 張為依
