= Fairchild TV =

Canadian Cantonese language channel

Fairchild TV 新時代電視
- Fairchild TV logo used for the website.

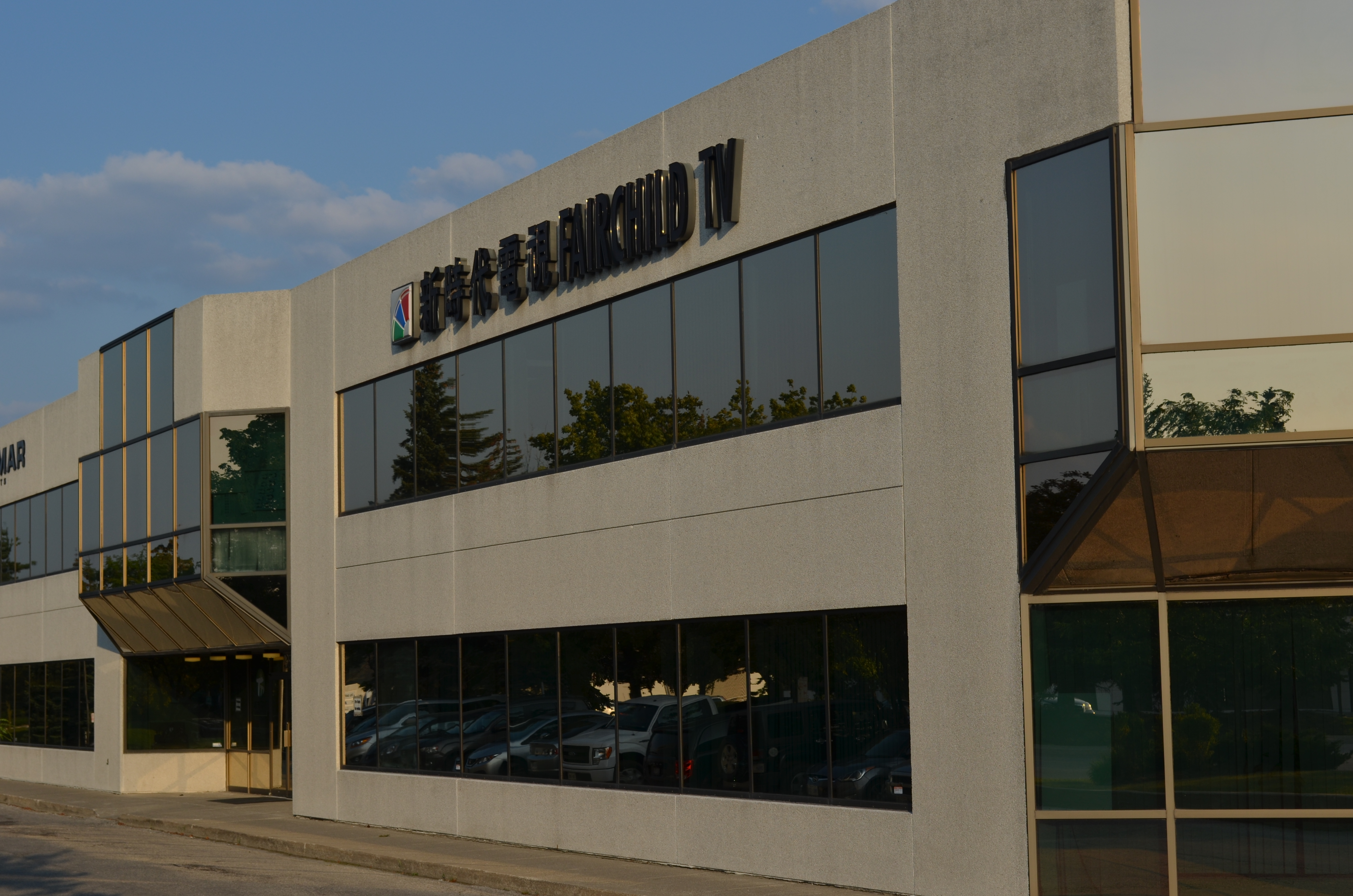
- Fairchild TV Studio in Richmond Hill
- Country: Canada
- Broadcast area: National
- Headquarters: Aberdeen Centre, Richmond, British Columbia; Richmond Hill, Ontario

Programming
- Language: Cantonese
- Picture format: 1080i (HDTV)

Ownership
- Owner: Fairchild Group (80%); TVB (20%)
- Sister channels: Fairchild TV 2 Talentvision

History
- Launched: December 23, 1993; 32 years ago
- Replaced: Chinavision

Links
- Website: Fairchild TV (in Cantonese) Fairchild TV (in English)

Fairchild TV
- Traditional Chinese: 新時代電視
- Simplified Chinese: 新时代电视
- Literal meaning: New Era Television
Transcriptions
Standard Mandarin
- Hanyu Pinyin: Xīnshídài diànshì
- Wade–Giles: Hsinshihtai tienshih
Yue: Cantonese
- Jyutping: San^{1}si^{4}doi^{6} din^{6}si^{6}

Fairchild TV (FTV) (Chinese: 新時代電視) is a Canadian Cantonese language exempt specialty channel. It is owned by Fairchild Group, with Hong Kong broadcaster TVB holding a 20% minority stake. Fairchild TV has studios in the Greater Toronto Area (Richmond Hill, Ontario) and Greater Vancouver (inside Aberdeen Centre in Richmond, British Columbia).

The channel's origins can be traced to the Cantonese broadcasting service Chinavision Canada, which was rebranded as Fairchild TV in 1993 when Thomas Fung purchased Chinavision.

== History ==
=== Early history ===
The predecessor of Fairchild Television was Chinavision, a Toronto-based company. In 1983, the Canadian Radio-television and Telecommunications Commission (CRTC) announced that it was considering issuing a national Chinese pay television license. Four organizations competed for the license, including World View Television, which had been granted a regional minority pay television license in British Columbia in 1982, and Chinavision, founded by Francis Cheung. Chinavision won the license in 1984 and began broadcasting in the same year. At that time, it broadcast seven days a week, eight hours a day (17:00 to 01:00 the next morning).

Given that Chinavision was in its infancy at that time, the authorities believed that the Vancouver area could not support two competing Chinese television stations. Therefore, they added a clause to the license of Chinavision restricting it from broadcasting in British Columbia for two years after its launch, so that World Television (later reorganized into Cathay Television in 1985) could maintain its status as the only Chinese television station in British Columbia. The authorities later lifted the broadcasting restrictions on Chinavision in 1987, and the station was able to receive broadcasts in British Columbia from then on. Chinavision at that time was dedicated to rebroadcasting programs from Hong Kong's Asia Television, while Cathay Television was dedicated to rebroadcasting programs from Hong Kong's TVB.

The financial situation of Chinavision has been poor since its launch. By 1992, it was in debt of about 8 million to 10 million Canadian dollars. In the same year, the Ontario court ordered the creditors to take over the company changed the management.

=== Fairchild takeover ===
In 1992, Fairchild Group owned by Vancouver-based Chinese businessman Thomas Fung, together with TVB, announced a joint investment of $9.25 million to acquire the assets of Chinavision and $3.8 million to acquire Cathay Television. The two transactions were approved by the CRTC in October and December of 1993 respectively, and the two stations were subsequently reorganized: the national television license originally belonging to Chinavision was reorganized into Fairchild Television, while the regional television license originally belonging to Cathay Television was reorganized into Talentvision. After the reorganization, Fairchild Television began to broadcast terrestrial television programs, but also produced some local programs.

In addition, Fairchild TV, after its reorganization, also implemented separate broadcasting in Toronto and Vancouver, with different program schedules in the two cities, and the news departments in the two cities also operated independently. However, this arrangement actually violated the terms of the station's national television license, and CFMT (the predecessor of OMNI), a multicultural television station in Toronto under Rogers Communications Group, filed a complaint with the CRTC in 2000. The authorities then ordered Fairchild TV to stop separate broadcasting and switch to national broadcasting in 2001. After the national broadcasting was implemented on July 2 of the same year, except for the advertising period, the content of the Vancouver signal was the same as that of the Toronto signal, only delayed by three hours due to the time difference between the two cities, and the production and broadcasting of news programs were also changed accordingly. (See Fairchild TV News).

In 2003, the station applied to the CRTC for a license renewal and also requested the authorities to amend the license terms to allow partial broadcasting. The application was approved in 2004, and the news program resumed partial broadcasting in the fall of the same year.

== Operations ==
The signal of Fairchild TV’s main channel is currently divided into two versions: Eastern Canada and Western Canada. The differences between the two before 2001 were quite significant, with different program schedules and news reports that were basically unrelated. Since the implementation of nationwide simulcasting in 2001, the two signals have been largely the same, except that the Western Canada version is broadcast 3 hours later than the Eastern Canada version to match the 3-hour time difference between the East and West coasts (so the program schedules of the two are exactly the same when calculated in local time). After the licensing terms were amended in 2004, the first half hour of evening news reports (19:00-19:30) was also broadcast separately in Vancouver and Toronto, and some providers would provide both Eastern and Western Canada versions of Fairchild Television for the convenience of viewers.

Throughout most of 2010s, Fairchild TV signed on at 6:00 a.m. everyday and signed off at 4:00 a.m every Tuesdays-Saturdays, 4:30 am on Sundays, and 3:55 am on Mondays. On October 2, 2022, Fairchild TV switched to a 24-hour schedule.

More than 475,000 Chinese Canadians across Canada watch Fairchild Television each day, roughly 30% of the whole Chinese population in Canada.

Until August 31, 2020, Fairchild TV operated two standard definition television channels: Fairchild TV in Cantonese and Talentvision in Mandarin. Both stations use programming from Vancouver and Toronto. On May 23, 2013, Fairchild TV launched two high-definition (HD) channels: Fairchild TV 2 HD in Cantonese and Talentvision 2 HD in Mandarin (ceased operations in July 2016). On September 1, 2020, Fairchild TV and Talenvision were upgraded to high definition. The Fairchild TV 2 "HD" signage was removed and the channel was renamed Fairchild TV 2.

Fairchild TV's logo used from 1993 to 2013.

== Programs ==
Fairchild TV broadcasts local (Canadian) and overseas (Asian) programming in the Cantonese language. It also serves as an overseas station of Hong Kong television station TVB. Due to that, Fairchild TV broadcasts TVB programmes, although at a time delay of up to one year due to obtaining overseas broadcasting rights. It has also broadcast programs from other Hong Kong television stations including ATV (previously), ViuTV, and additionally feature popular Mainland Chinese programmes. Fairchild TV also organises annual events, such as the Miss Chinese Vancouver Pageant, Miss Chinese Toronto Pageant, Those Days•These Songs Singing Contest, and TVB Fairchild Fans Party. Fairchild TV previously organized New Talent Singing Awards Vancouver Audition, New Talent Singing Awards Toronto Audition, Calgary New Talent Singing Awards, and Project Boyz Power. These programs are broadcast live nationally. Many of the contestants from these contests have gone on to hosting television shows on Fairchild TV and some earn fame in Asia. Most notable are Bernice Liu, Linda Chung, and Leanne Li, former Miss Chinese Vancouver Pageant and Miss Chinese International Pageant winners; and Jacky Chu, Elva Hsiao and Jade Kwan of New Talent Singing Awards Vancouver Audition.

== Current local programming list ==
=== Weekly/daily programs ===
- Morning Exercise 最緊要運動
- Timeline Magazine 時代雜誌
- What's On 熒幕八爪娛
- Magazine 26 26分鐘見證實錄
- Chatting Platform 時事評台
- Vibe Loop 潮流無限Loop
- News Talk 時事直擊

=== Annual events ===
- Miss Chinese Toronto Pageant 多倫多華裔小姐競選
- Miss Chinese Vancouver Pageant 溫哥華華裔小姐競選

== Current artistes & presenters ==
Name	Active at FTV since	Associated city	Currently hosting	Previously hosted	Notables
Mandy Chan 陳敏愷	2001	Vancouver	Chinese New Year Countdown TVB Fairchild Fans Party	Leisure Talk Missy Missy In Search of Tasty Cuisines	Also, DJ at FM 96.1
Leo Shiu 蕭嘉俊	2001	Toronto	Miss Chinese Toronto Pageant	What's On Leisure Talk	New Talent Singing Awards Toronto Audition 2000 Finalist Formerly host of TVB's Entertainment News Channel from 2005 to 2006
Brian Chiu 趙穎䝼	2016	Vancouver	Miss Chinese Vancouver Pageant		Also, DJ at FM 96.1
Rachel Wong 黃萃華	2016	Toronto	What's On Vibe Loop	Entertainment Circle	Those Days•These Songs Singing Contest 2 Second-Runner Up Formerly Video Editor & Production Assistant at Fairchild TV News
Cynthia Fu 符善婷	2018	Toronto	What's On Vibe Loop	Entertainment Circle	2017 Miss Chinese Toronto Pageant Second-Runner Up
Vicky Wu 吳曉鈴	2021	Vancouver	What’s On	In Search of Tasty Cuisines	2020 Miss Chinese Vancouver Pageant Second-Runner Up Also hosts Talentvision's Urban Life
Albert Cheung 章志文	2022	Toronto	Miss Chinese Toronto Pageant TVB Fairchild Fans Party		Former TVB Actor & Host Also, DJ at AM 1430
David Ruan 阮駿龍	2024	Toronto	What's On Vibe Loop		Those Days•These Songs 2 Singing Contest Winner
Fion Yung 容羨媛	2025	Vancouver	What's On		Former TVB Host of "Scoop"
Claudia Lam 林映說	2025	Vancouver	What's On		2024 Miss Chinese Vancouver Pageant Finalist
Natalie So 蘇芷晞	2025	Toronto	What's On Vibe Loop		2024 Miss Chinese Toronto Pageant First-Runner Up
Juvally Chan 陳靖如	2025	Toronto	What's On Vibe Loop		2024 Miss Chinese Toronto Pageant Winner
Alvis Kwok 郭文熙	2025	Toronto	Vibe Loop		Those Days•These Songs 2 Singing Contest Finalist
Jessica Li 李焯欣	2026	Toronto	Vibe Loop		2025 Miss Chinese Toronto Pageant First Runner-Up
Stephanie Leung 梁藹莉	2026	Toronto	Vibe Loop		2025 Miss Chinese Toronto Pageant Finalist

== Notable former presenters ==
The following is a list of former Fairchild Television presenters that are currently affiliated with other media outlets.

- Lily Hong (康子妮), hosted a few programmes for Fairchild TV Toronto in the late 90s to early 2000s. Former TVB contract artiste.
- Monica Lo (盧淑儀), Miss Chinese Toronto 1996 and Miss Chinese International 1997, hosted for Fairchild TV Toronto. Current Hong Kong film actress and model.
- Eric Li (李潤庭), former Fairchild TV Vancouver presenter and news anchor. Later presenter for Cable TV Hong Kong's entertainment news channel and TVB's Entertainment News Channel and Scoop.
- Janis Chan (陳貝兒), former Fairchild Radio Vancouver DJ and host of What's On Vancouver. Later presenter for Cable TV Hong Kong's entertainment news channel and TVB's Entertainment News Channel.
- Edcon Gabriel Yau (丘雨勤), former Fairchild TV presenter & sports news anchor in Toronto and former DJ host in Fairchild Radio Toronto. Currently a sports presenter for Now TV in Hong Kong and the official NBA Global Games MC in Greater China.
- Eunice Ho (何詠雯), New Talent Singing Awards Vancouver Audition 2003 Finalist, former host of What's On Vancouver. Formerly a television presenter for TVB's entertainment news channel.
- Aimee Chan (陳茵媺) & Janet Chow (周家蔚), Miss Chinese Toronto Pageant 2004 Finalists, former hosts of What's On Toronto. Entered Miss Hong Kong Pageant 2006; Chan won the crown, Chow won first runner-up; former TVB contract artistes.
- Kayi Cheung (張嘉兒), Miss Chinese (Vancouver) Pageant 2005 Vivacious Beauty award winner, former host of What's On Vancouver. Entered Miss Hong Kong Pageant 2007 and won the crown.
- Rikko Lee (李靄璣), former Fairchild Radio Vancouver DJ and host of What's On Vancouver. Signed to TVB as an artist and was a host and reporter for the 2008 Summer Olympics and 2009 Hong Kong East-Asian Games. Former host of TVB's weekly sports programme Sports World and daily financial programme Money Smart on HD Jade.
- Rachel Zhang (張書玉), Miss Chinese Toronto Pageant 2022 Finalist, former host of Mandarin Profile. Later anchor for OMNI News

== See also ==
- Fairchild TV News
- Fairchild TV 2
- Talentvision (TTV)
