= Chinavision Canada =

Canadian TV channel

Chinavision (加拿大中文電視台), was a Canadian television broadcasting company.

It was launched in 1984 by Francis Cheung of Toronto, Ontario to provide a first pay-TV station for Chinese language viewers in Toronto. The station's content was roughly 90% Cantonese and 10% Mandarin.

In 1987, the station expanded to Vancouver, British Columbia. The station rights were later sold to The Fairchild Group (owned by Happy Valley Investments Limited via Thomas Fung) and Condor (owned by TVB Limited of Hong Kong) after receivership in 1992, to form Fairchild TV in 1993.

== Content ==
Contingent on the application to the Canadian Radio-television and Telecommunications Commission (CRTC) Chinavision was required to have minimum of 30% Canadian made programs with the remainder from sources outside of Canada (mainly Hong Kong, China).

== Broadcasting time ==
Chinavision's broadcaster hours were limited to two periods:

- 4:30 p.m. to 12:30 a.m. weekdays
- 2:30 p.m. to 12:30 a.m. on weekends

Original broadcast time was from 5pm to 1am daily.

Programming in Toronto was replayed in Vancouver and other markets.

== Studios ==
Studios in Toronto were located within the city (160 Duncan Mills Road) and moved after the sale to Fairchild to Richmond Hill, Ontario.

== Subscription ==
Viewers of Chinavision, namely in Toronto area had to obtain a converted box that had to connected to their existing cable boxes to decode signals for the channel. Thus Chinavision was only available to cable subscribers only.

In 1991 Chinavision had about 110,000 subscribers across Canada (Toronto, Vancouver, Edmonton and Calgary).

== China influence in Chinavision ==
Chinavision was involved in an investigation by CSIS on their speculations of connections to Chinese authorities trying to influence media after the Tiananmen Square protests of 1989.

== Sale ==
After 1990 Chinavision was in facing financial difficulties and was sought out by two buyers, but eventually sold to Fairchild Group in 1993, who transformed the channel to Fairchild TV.

== Former staff and Others Connected with Chinavision ==
A number of TVB staff and other Hong Kong personalities were hired or worked with the station from 1984 to 1990s:

- Louise Li - Hong Kong actress was newspresenter in Toronto in the 1980s (1986-1989)
- Lau Dan - Hong Kong actor who briefly worked for the station when his family moved to Canada (son Harwick Lau attended school in Toronto until 1994)
- Ivan Ho - Hong Kong actor who briefly worked for the station
- Teresa Cheung, Hong Kong socialite, was cultural ambassador for the channel and daughter of the owner Francis Cheung
- Jean Lumb, corporate director; Toronto restaurateur and community activist
