= CHKF-FM =

Fairchild Radio station in Calgary

Coordinates: 51°09′43″N 114°12′34″W

- Calgary, Alberta; Canada
- Broadcast area: Calgary Metropolitan Region
- Frequency: 94.7 MHz
- Branding: Fairchild Radio

Programming
- Format: Multilingual

Ownership
- Owner: Fairchild Group

History
- First air date: November 1998
- Call sign meaning: Hong Kong, Fairchild

Technical information
- Class: C1
- ERP: 23 kW (vertical); 53 kW (horizontal)
- HAAT: 198.3 metres (651 ft)

Links
- Webcast: Listen Live
- Website: fm947.com

CHKF-FM is a radio station that broadcasts multicultural content, including a major Chinese programming block entitled Fairchild Radio at 94.7 FM in Calgary, Alberta, Canada. It is owned by Fairchild Group.

Original Fairchild Radio logo, used until 2012.

CHKF's studios are located on 37th Avenue Northeast in Calgary, while its transmitter is located near the Arbour Lake neighbourhood in northwest Calgary near Stoney Trail.

CHKF's programming is primarily Cantonese with some Cambodian, Croatian, Filipino, German, Hindi, Hungarian, Irish, Italian, Korean, Lao, Macedonian, Mandarin, Polish, Punjabi, Romanian, Russian, Spanish, Thai, Urdu and Vietnamese programming during the evenings and on weekends.
