= Fairchild Group =

Canadian business conglomerate

The Fairchild Group

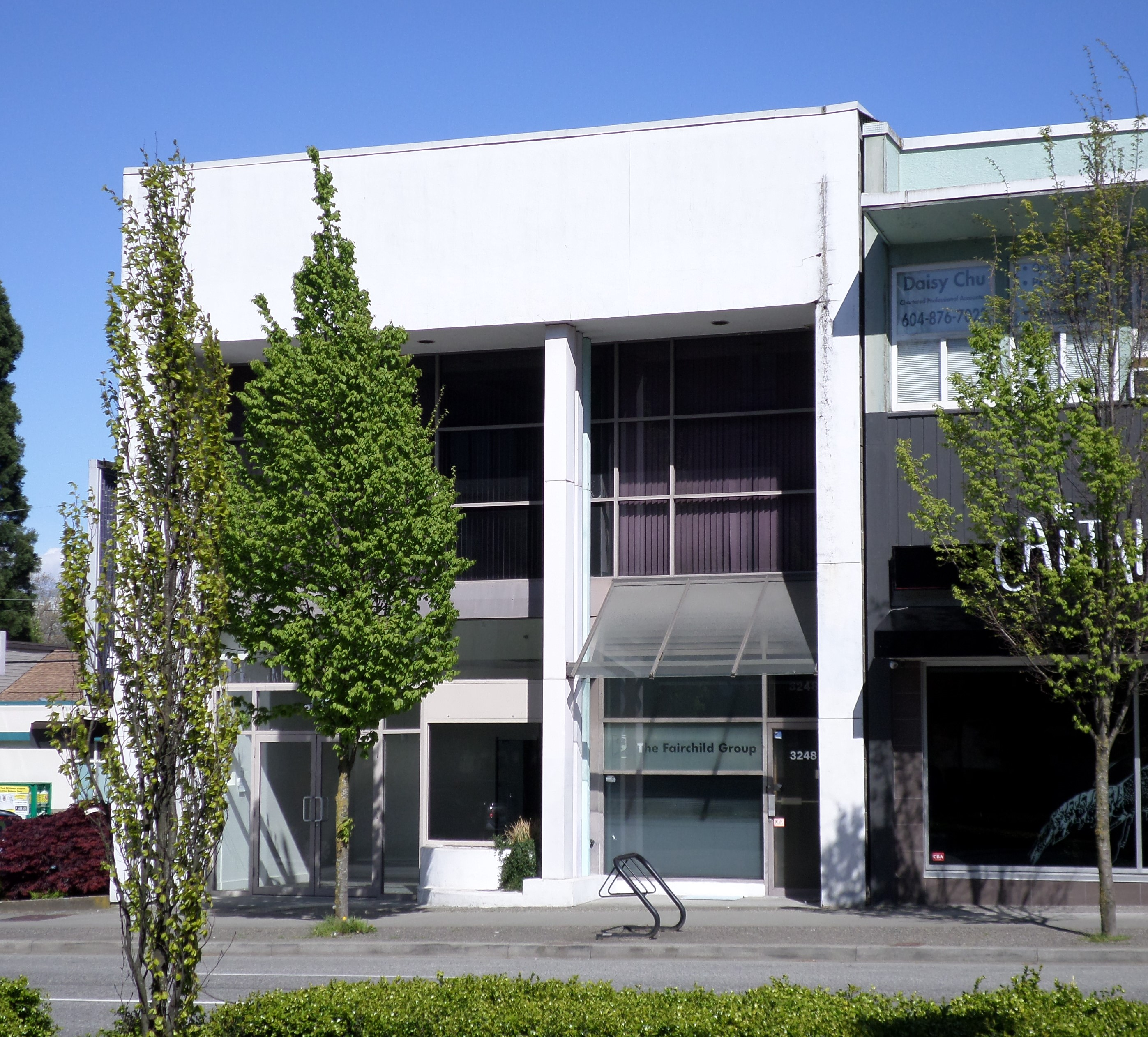
- Fairchild Group headquarters
- Type: Private
- Industry: Media
- Founded: 1983; 43 years ago
- Headquarters: 3248 Cambie Street; Vancouver, British Columbia; V5Z 2W4
- Key people: Thomas Fung Wing Fat (Chairman)
- Products: Broadcasting, Publishing, Retail, Real estate development
- Owner: Thomas Fung Wing Fat

Chinese name
- Traditional Chinese: 新時代集團
- Simplified Chinese: 新时代集团
Transcriptions
Standard Mandarin
- Hanyu Pinyin: Xīnshídài Jítuán
Yue: Cantonese
- Jyutping: San^{1}si^{4}doi^{6} Zaap^{6}tyun^{4}
- Website: www.fairchildgroup.com

The Fairchild Group is a Canadian business conglomerate headquartered in Vancouver, British Columbia, Canada. Fairchild Group operates various media properties under the Fairchild Media Group name. Fairchild currently operates the Cantonese channel Fairchild TV, Cantonese & Mandarin radio network Fairchild Radio, and Mandarin channel Talentvision. Fairchild Group is also involved in film production, real estate development, retail, telecommunications and wholesale trade.

== History ==
The Fairchild Media Group acquired the Canadian Radio-television and Telecommunications Commission (CRTC) broadcasting licence from Chinavision Canada and Cathay TV in 1993 to form Fairchild TV and Talentvision respectively. Later on, it formed Fairchild Radio with stations in Vancouver, Calgary and Toronto. It has an investment portfolio over US$350 million.

The company's corporate headquarters are located in Vancouver, British Columbia with separate regional offices in Richmond Hill, Ontario and Calgary, Alberta.

== Ownership ==
The Fairchild Group is mostly owned by Hong Kong-born Canadian businessman Thomas Fung Wing Fat. However, the Hong Kong-based media company TVB has a minor stake of 20 percent.

== Coverage ==
- 80% Cantonese
- 20% Mandarin

== Fairchild Media Group ==
=== Television ===
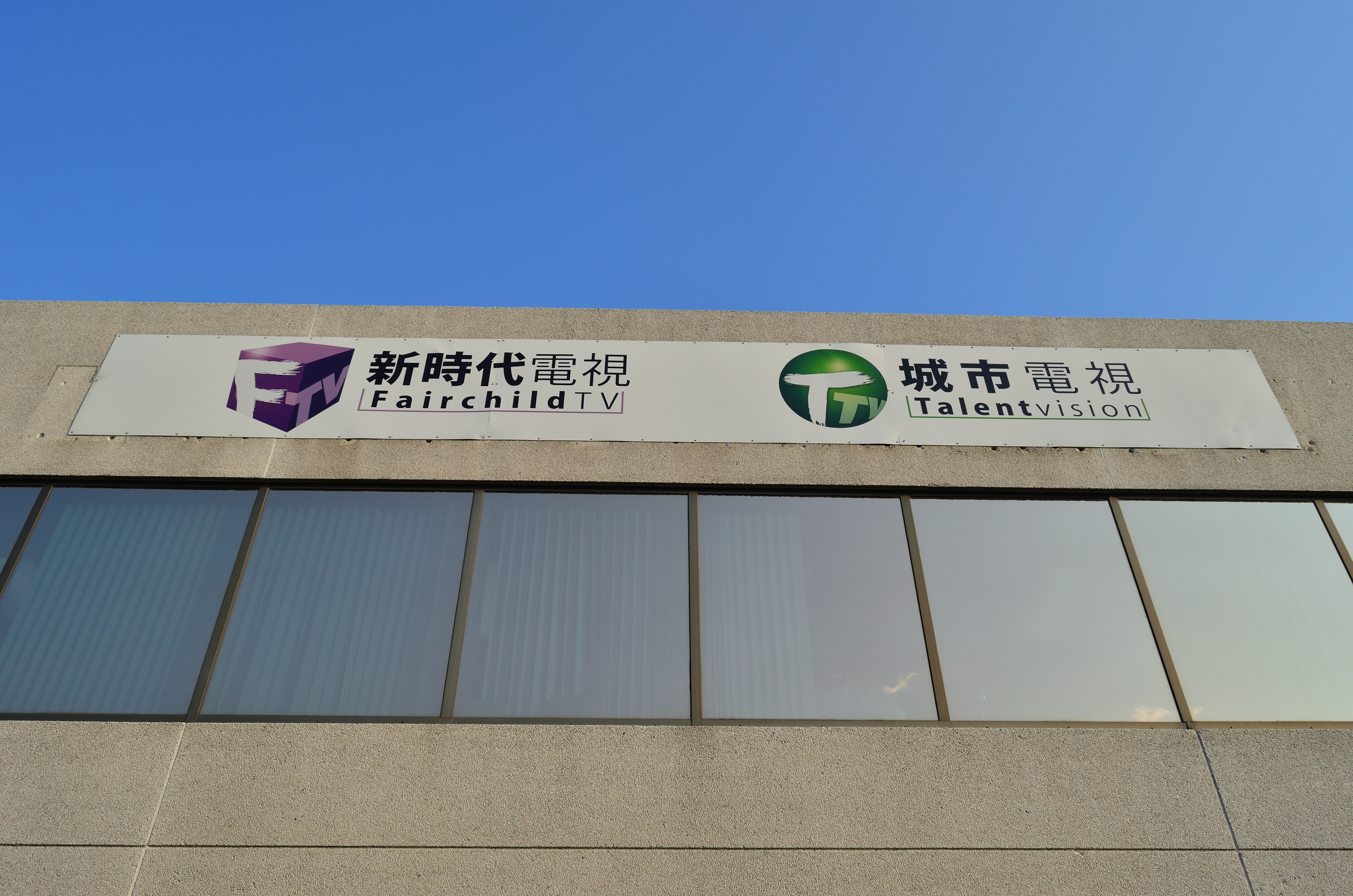
Fairchild TV and Talentvision studio in Richmond Hill

Fairchild Group operates four national ethnic television channels that cater to both Cantonese & Mandarin speaking audiences- Fairchild TV, Fairchild TV 2 & Talentvision. Hong Kong broadcaster TVB owns a minority stake (20%) in both channels.

Fairchild TV and Talentvision currently consists of four feeds:

- Fairchild TV 1 Toronto (Cantonese)
- Fairchild TV 1 Vancouver (Cantonese)
- Fairchild TV 2 (Cantonese)
- Talentvision (Mandarin)

=== Radio Stations ===
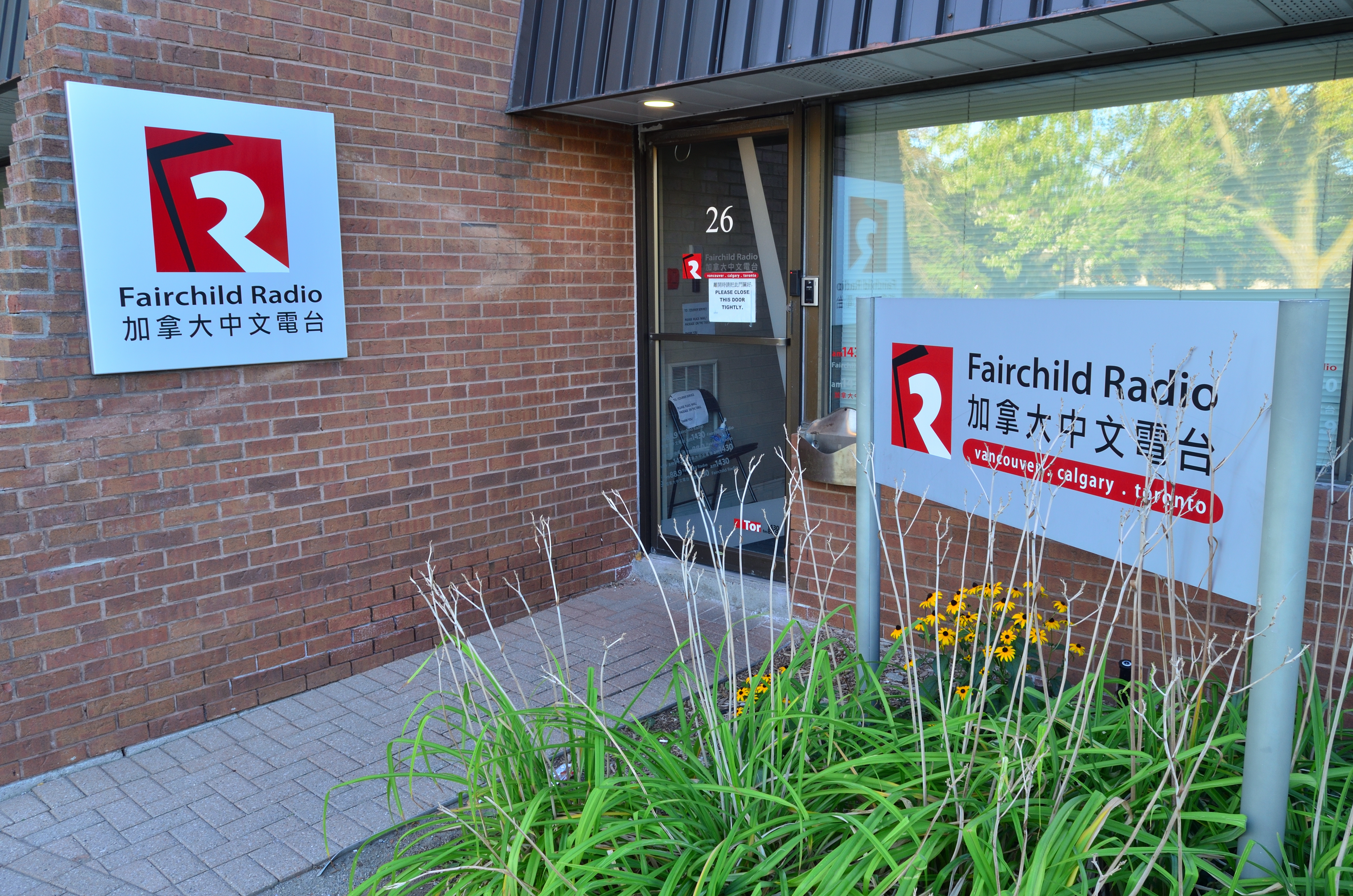
Fairchild Radio studio in Markham

Fairchild Group operates three multicultural radio stations. All stations feature programming for both Cantonese- & Mandarin-speaking audiences:

- Fairchild Radio Calgary: CHKF-FM/94.7 (Cantonese & Mandarin broadcast)
- Fairchild Radio Toronto: CHKT/1430 (Cantonese & Mandarin broadcast)
- Fairchild Radio Vancouver: CHKG-FM/96.1 (Cantonese & Mandarin broadcast)

In October 2019, Fairchild Radio gained public attention when it fired a Toronto talk-show host allegedly because of his questions during an interview perceived as critical of the Chinese government's stance on the 2019–2020 Hong Kong protests.

In March 2026, it closed its AM station in Vancouver, CJVB 1470.

== Film production ==
Fairchild Group operates Fairchild Films International Limited, a motion picture production company that creates Chinese language films for international audiences.

The company has produced one film, Paper Moon Affair, in 2005.

== Real estate development and management ==
- Aberdeen Centre, Richmond, B.C. – One of the many Asian shopping malls in the Golden Village district.
- Aberdeen Residence, Richmond, B.C. – A residential complex attached to Aberdeen Centre.
- Aberdeen Square, Richmond, B.C. – A new shopping mall and office tower completed in 2014, that will be attached to Aberdeen Centre and Aberdeen Residence.
- English Bay Village, Vancouver, B.C.
- Fairchild Square, Vancouver, B.C. – New FMG headquarters and office tower.

== Retail ==
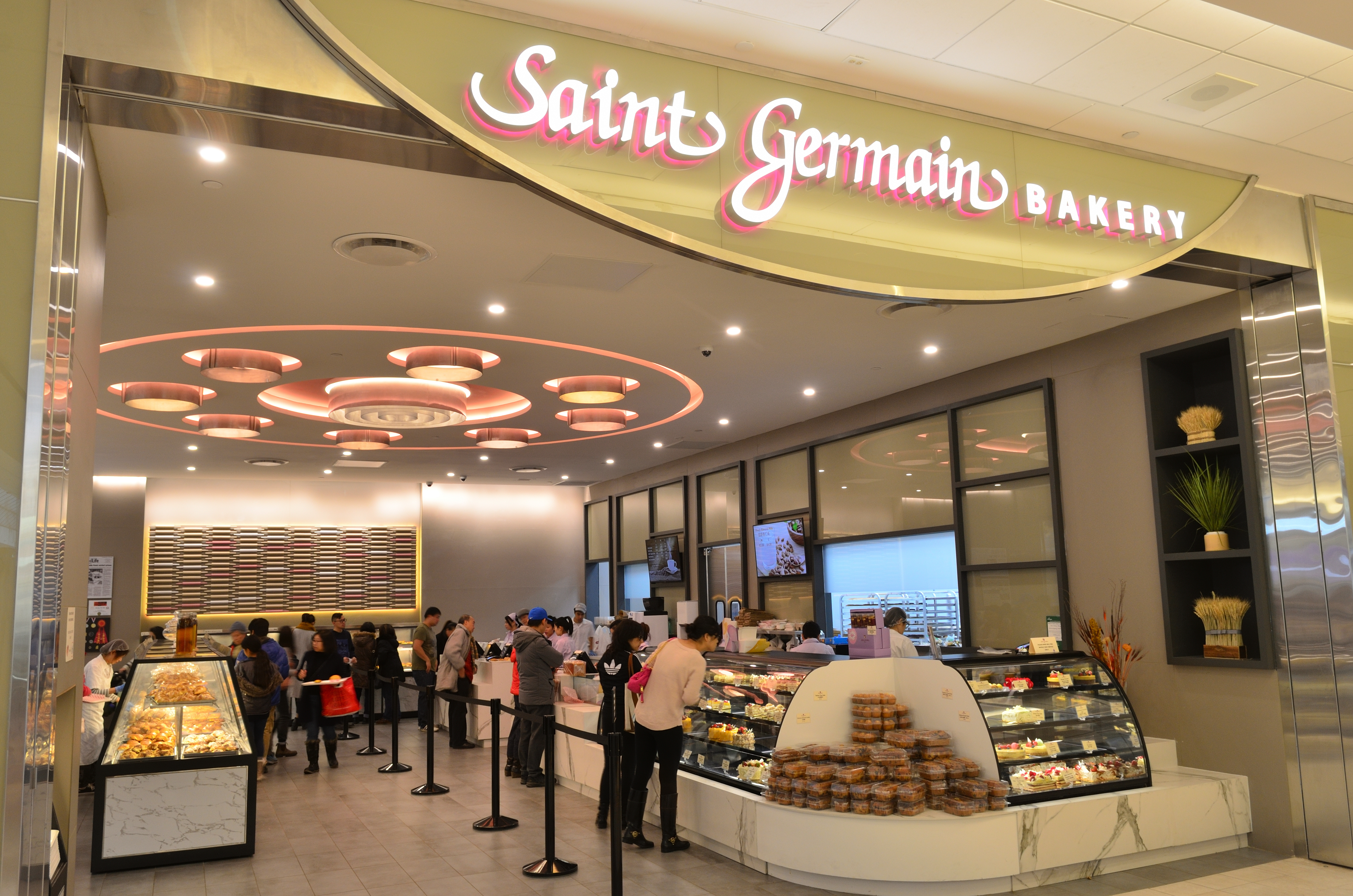
Saint Germain Bakery in Markham, Ontario

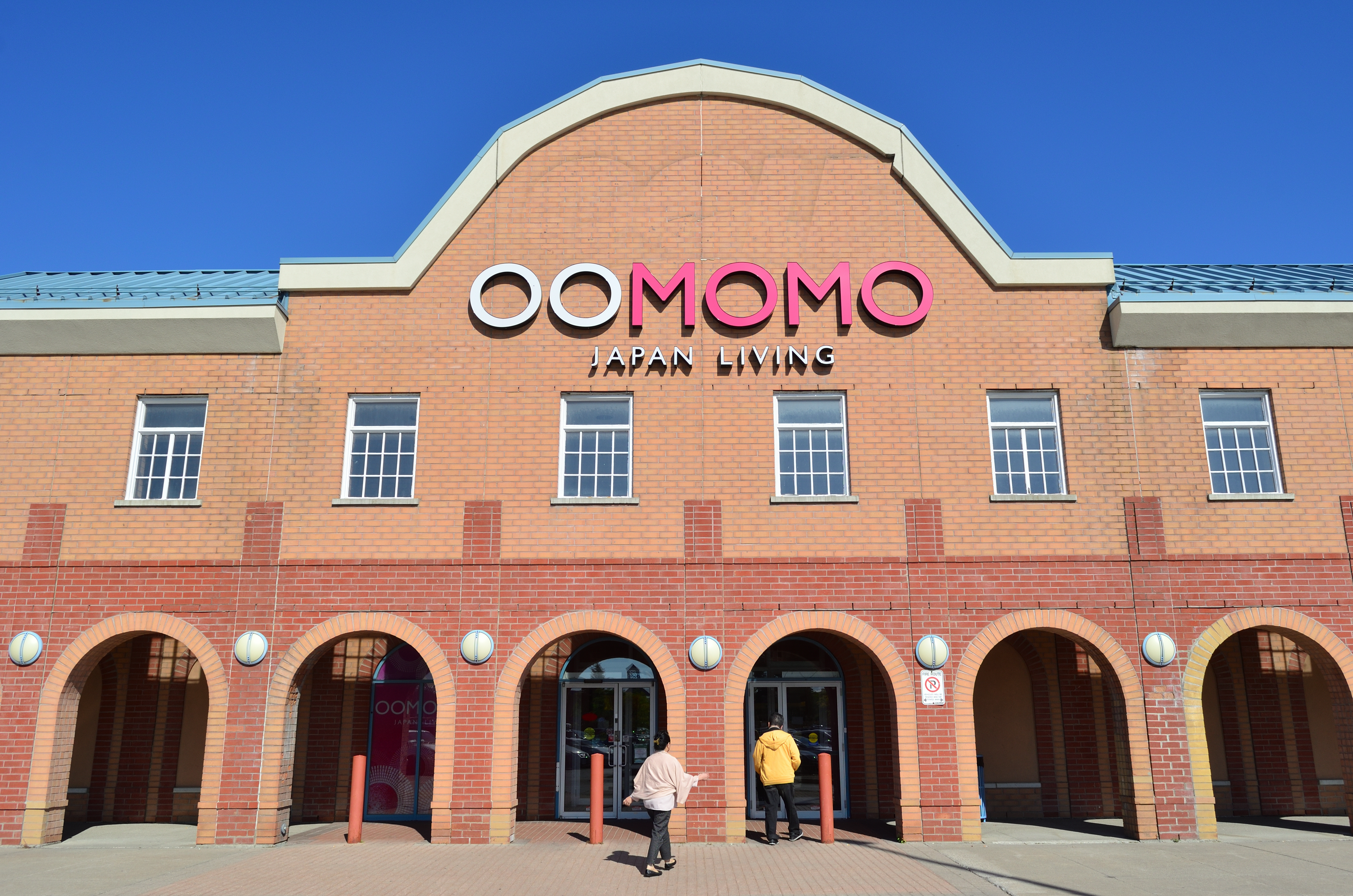
Oomomo in Markham, Ontario

All retail operations are in British Columbia other than Oomomo and St Germain Bakery (British Columbia and Ontario):

- Saint Germain Bakery – Chinese bakery (1986)
- Aberdeen Post Office
- Racing Devils Hobbies – Hobby store
- Smart Living Design – Home furniture store
- Smart Office Furniture – Office furniture store
- A Light Idea – Lighting retail store
- Memory Collection – Gift shop
- Living Colors – Modern home & kitchenware store
- aR Fashion – Fashion retailer
- Ozone Fashion – Fashion retailer
- Gado Gado Fashion – Men's fashion retailer
- Gibson Travel Accessories – Luggage / backpack / Travel accessories
- IT Power – Computer Retail / service store
- Menji Stationery Store – Stationery retailer
- Impulse Sports – Sporting Equipment Retailer
- Super Garage – Auto accessories
- Party Goodies – Party supply retailer
- Pot and Plant- Artificial floral retailer
- Pot Arts – Closed
- Timbuktu Military Surplus & Apparel – Military Surplus & Apparel retailer – Closed
- Voodoo Palace – Voodoo dolls retailer
- Bike Stop – Closed
- Giordano
- Santayaya
- Planet Food
- 7th Heaven Cafe – Closed
- Ajijiman
- Hanabi
- Bean Factory
- Frappe Bliss
- Hainanese Chicken
- David and Goliath
- Oomomo – 100-yen shops

== Trading ==
- Hutchison Imports has extensive wholesale and distribution interests in general merchandise, dollar store items, toys, RC hobby, sports, apparel, furniture, consumer and lifestyle products. The company works with manufacturers and suppliers all over the world to source out products for the North American market.

Hutchison Imports has its own brand – "Menji". Menji products are fast becoming a staple on many dollar/discount store shelves.

== Telecommunications ==
Fairchild Group operates various online, internet-based businesses:

- eSeeNet.com Ltd.- A business solutions company, founded in 1995
- eSeeHosting- Web hosting provider
- Lynx Communications- Internet service provider, based in Richmond, British Columbia

== Foreign investment ==
- Stone Group – a pharmaceutical firm in China via Fairchild Investments Ltd.

== See also ==
- Chinese Canadians in British Columbia
