= Aberdeen Centre =

Coordinates: 49.184053°N 123.133639°W

- 時代坊

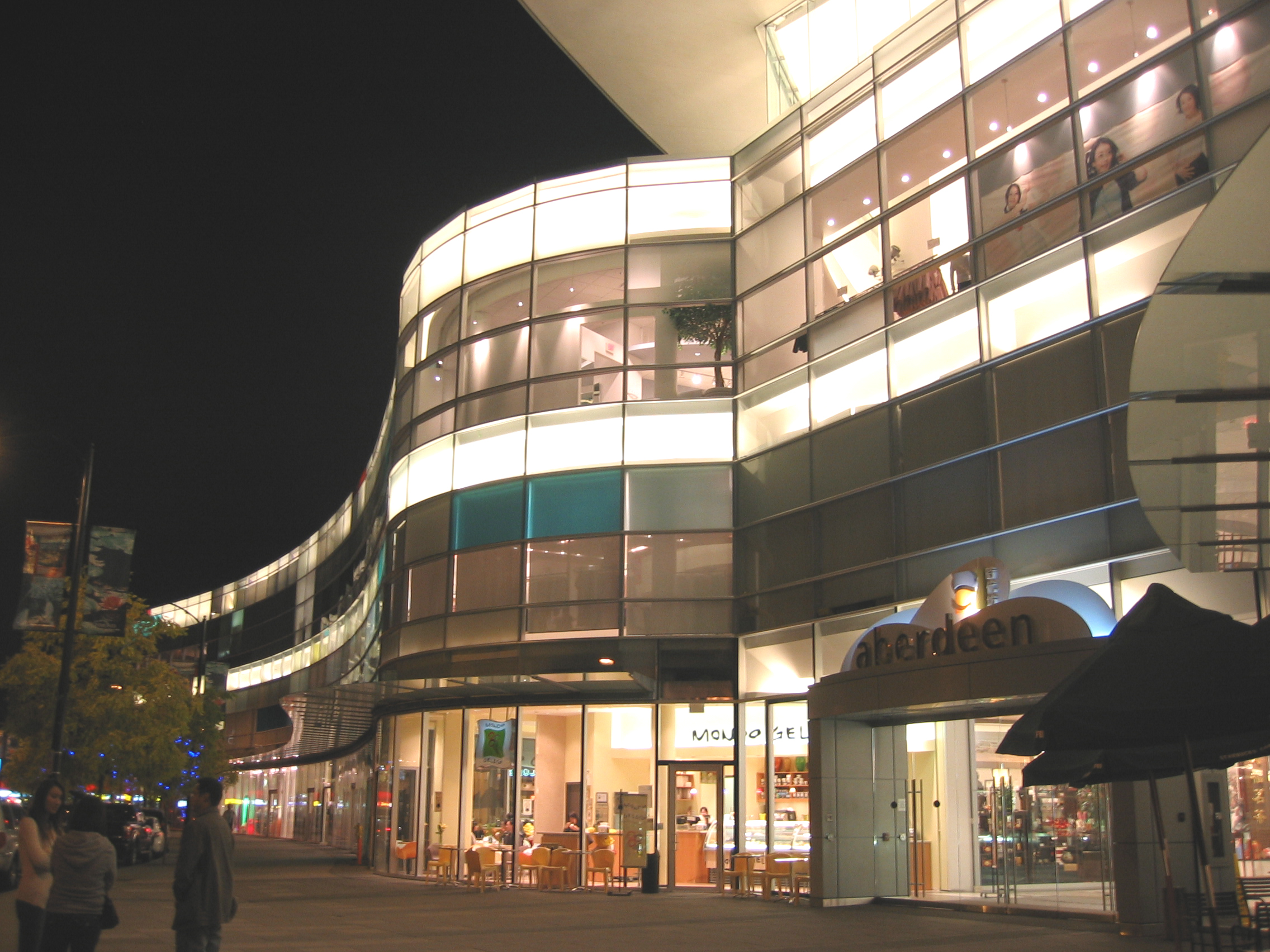
- Exterior view of Aberdeen Centre, at night
- Address: 4151 Hazelbridge Way; Richmond, British Columbia, Canada
- Opened: 1989; 37 years ago (original building); 2003; 23 years ago (current building); 2013; 13 years ago (Aberdeen Square)
- Closed: 2000 (original building)
- Developer: Fairchild Development
- Manager: Fairchild Group
- Owner: Fairchild Group
- Architect: Bing Thom Architects
- Num. of stores: 160+
- Num. of anchor tenants: 1
- Floor area: 380,000 sq ft (35,000 m^{2})
- Floors: 3
- Parking: Yes, multi-leveled
- Public transit: Aberdeen
- Website: www.aberdeencentre.com

Aberdeen Centre
- Traditional Chinese: 時代坊
Transcriptions
Yue: Cantonese
- Yale Romanization: Sìh doih fōng
- Jyutping: Si4 doi6 fong1

Aberdeen Centre is a shopping mall in Richmond, British Columbia. It is located in the Golden Village district on Hazelbridge Way, bordered by Cambie Road to the north.

== History ==
The original Aberdeen Centre

Old Aberdeen Centre logo

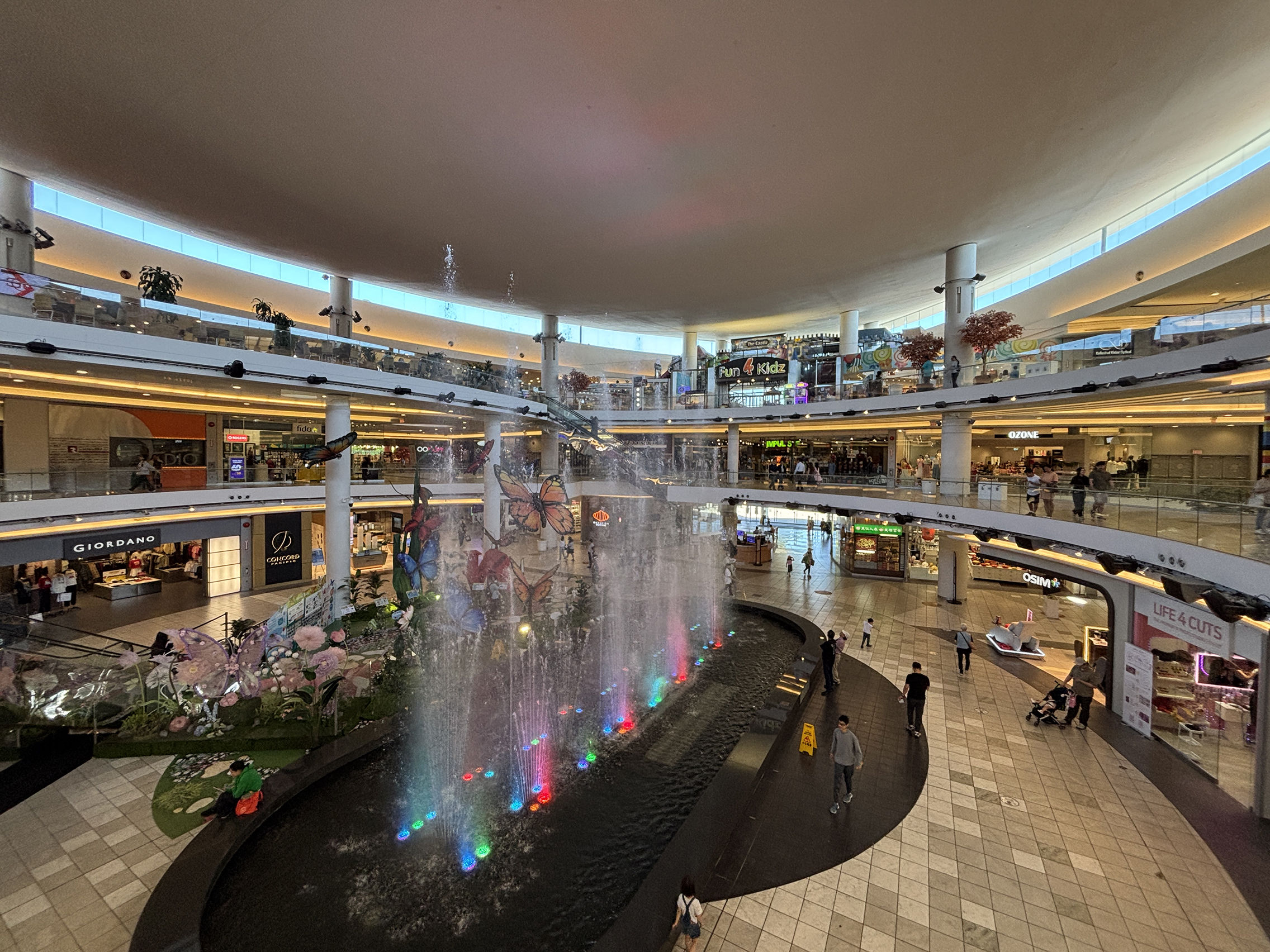
Aberdeen Centre atrium music fountain

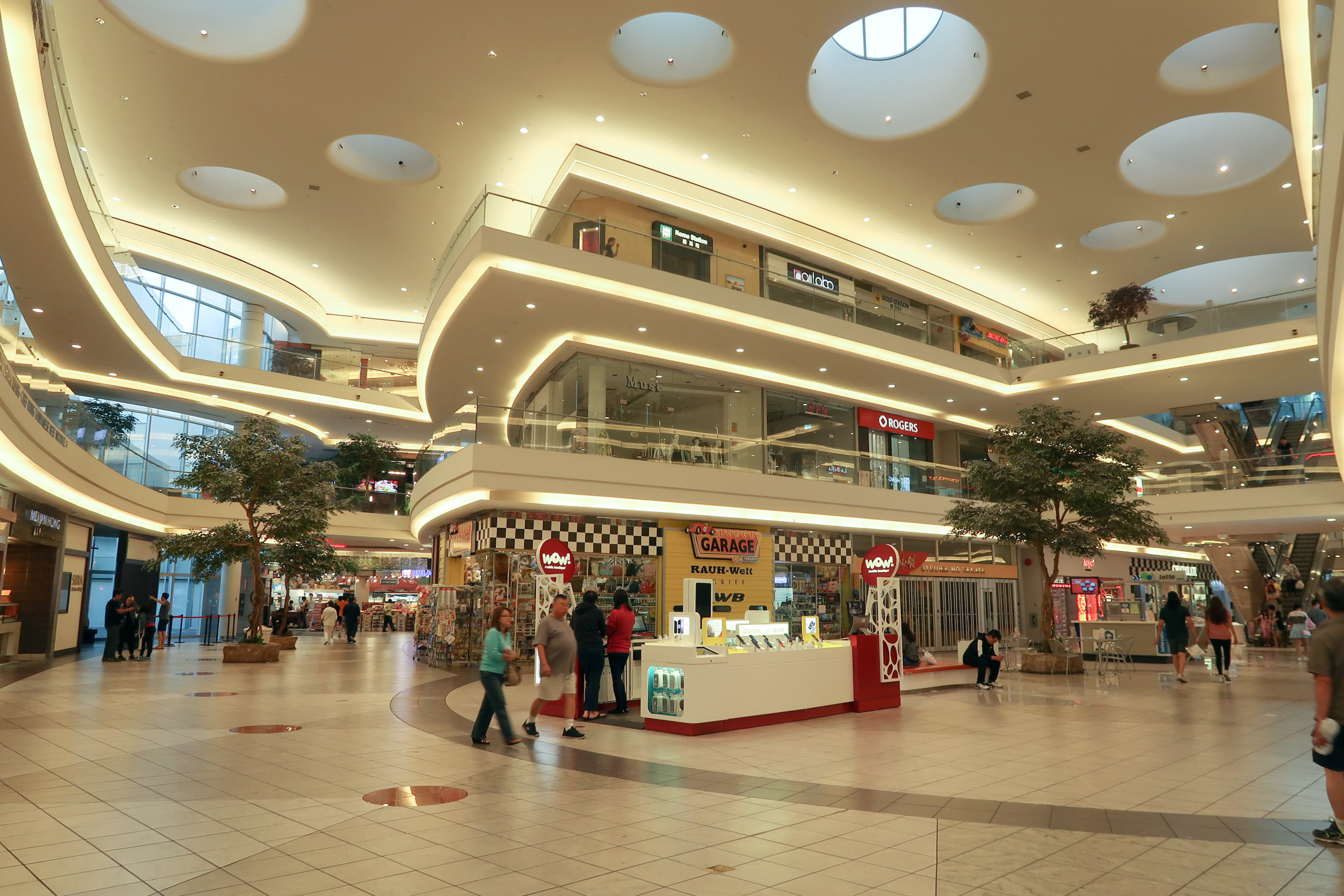
Aberdeen Centre void

The original Aberdeen Centre was built in 1989. It contained about 50 to 75 stores. The original Chinese name was "香港仔中心", which refers to the Chinese name of Aberdeen, Hong Kong. Envisioned as an "Asian mall" in anticipation of the coming wave of migration from Hong Kong due to the impending 1997 Handover of Hong Kong, Aberdeen Centre's developer Thomas Fung had trouble finding tenants initially since there had been no Asian malls in North America in the 1980s. Fung offered to buy a 50 percent equity stake in any store setting up in Aberdeen with an option for tenants to buy back the shares with no interest if business flourished. Almost 95 percent successfully bought back the shares within a year of the mall's opening.

As new Asian malls such as Yaohan Centre and President Plaza opened, it soon became apparent that the original Aberdeen Centre was too small to compete. It was demolished in 2001 and was rebuilt for approximately $100 million. The current Aberdeen Centre, opened in 2003, is about three times the original mall's size and has around 100 stores.

There are restaurants on its upper floors. An indoor musical fountain, similar to the one in front of Bellagio Hotel in Las Vegas but smaller in scale, was built at the centre of the mall and performs shows every hour.

In 2006, the mall became home to the operations of Fairchild Group's Chinese-language TV and radio operations in Vancouver. Fairchild Radio CJVB AM1470 is closed in 2026 (CHKG FM96.1) now has studios on the second floor, while Fairchild TV and Talentvision have their news studios on the third floor.

On August 8, 2008, the largest viewing party in the Vancouver area for the 2008 Summer Olympics took place at the mall, with thousands of spectators, some of whom had lined up since 3:30 in the morning.

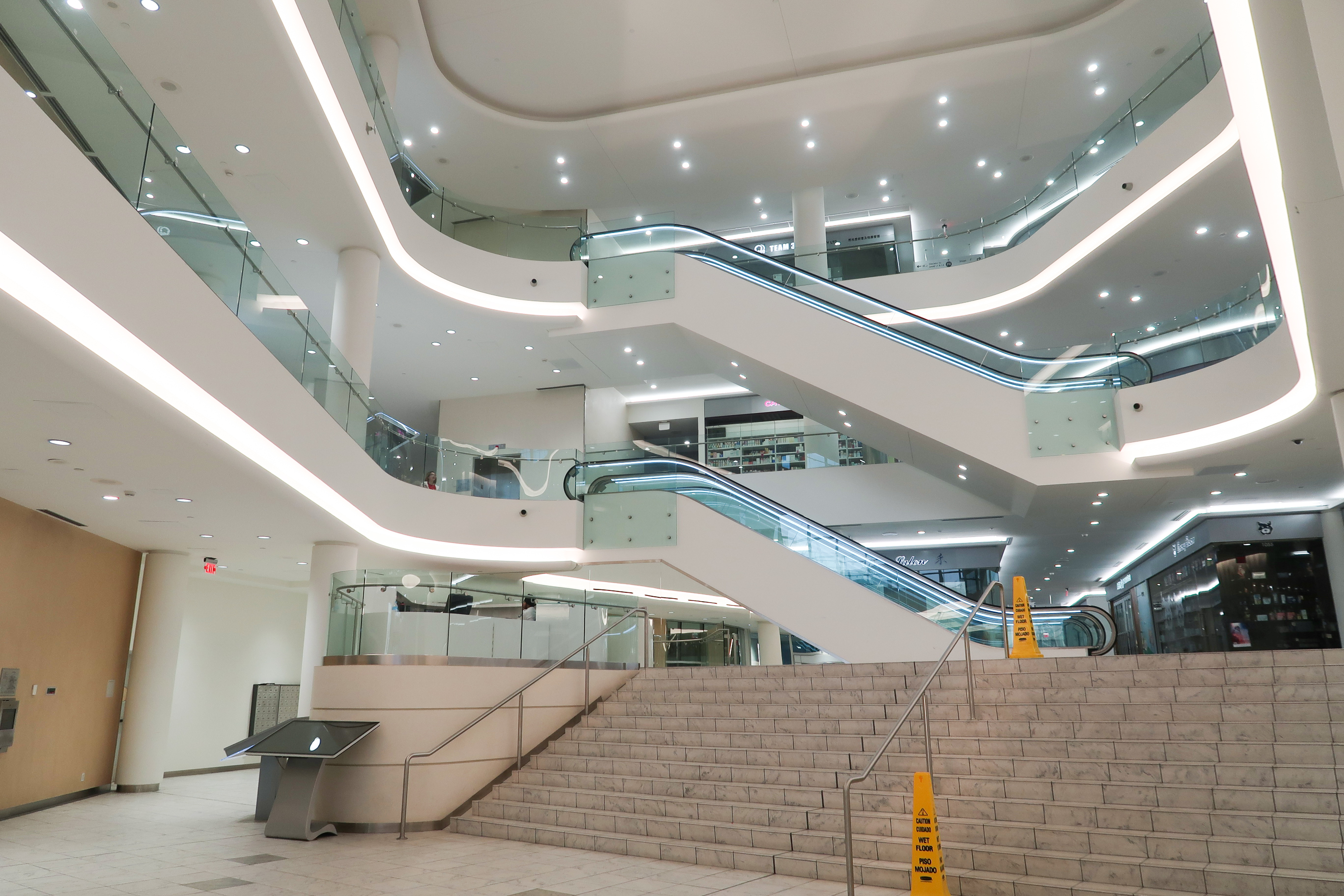
Aberdeen Square opened in 2013.

The third phase of the development, Aberdeen Square, opened in 2013. It has three retail and three office levels.

== Transportation ==
Access to the SkyTrain's Canada Line is available through the mall's third phase, Aberdeen Square. The mall is connected directly to line's Aberdeen station via an overhead walkway to the northbound platform.

Public transit buses, serviced by TransLink, have connections to the mall, with routes serving Richmond and New Westminster.

== Gallery ==
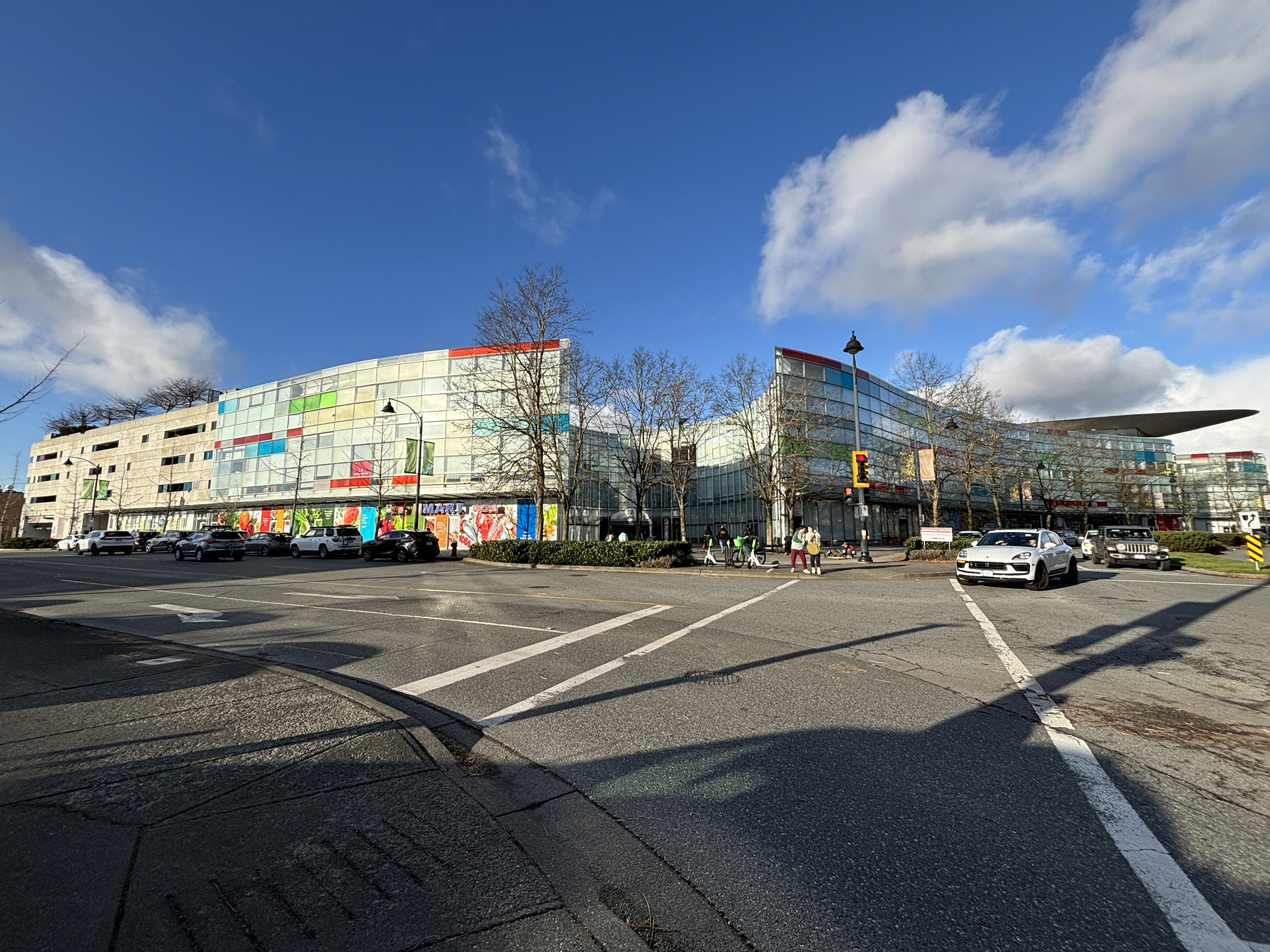
Exterior view of Aberdeen Centre

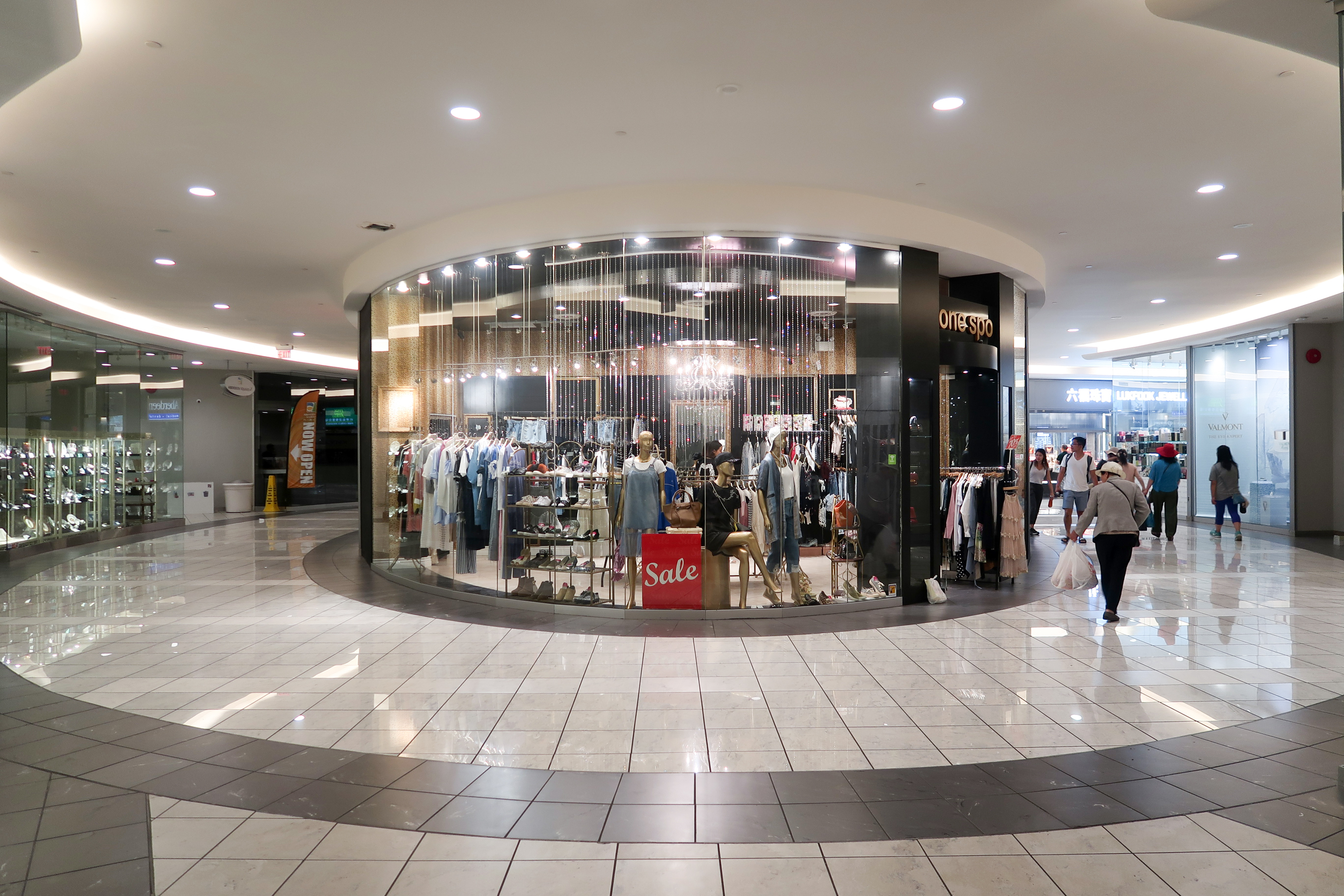
Aberdeen Centre level 2 shops

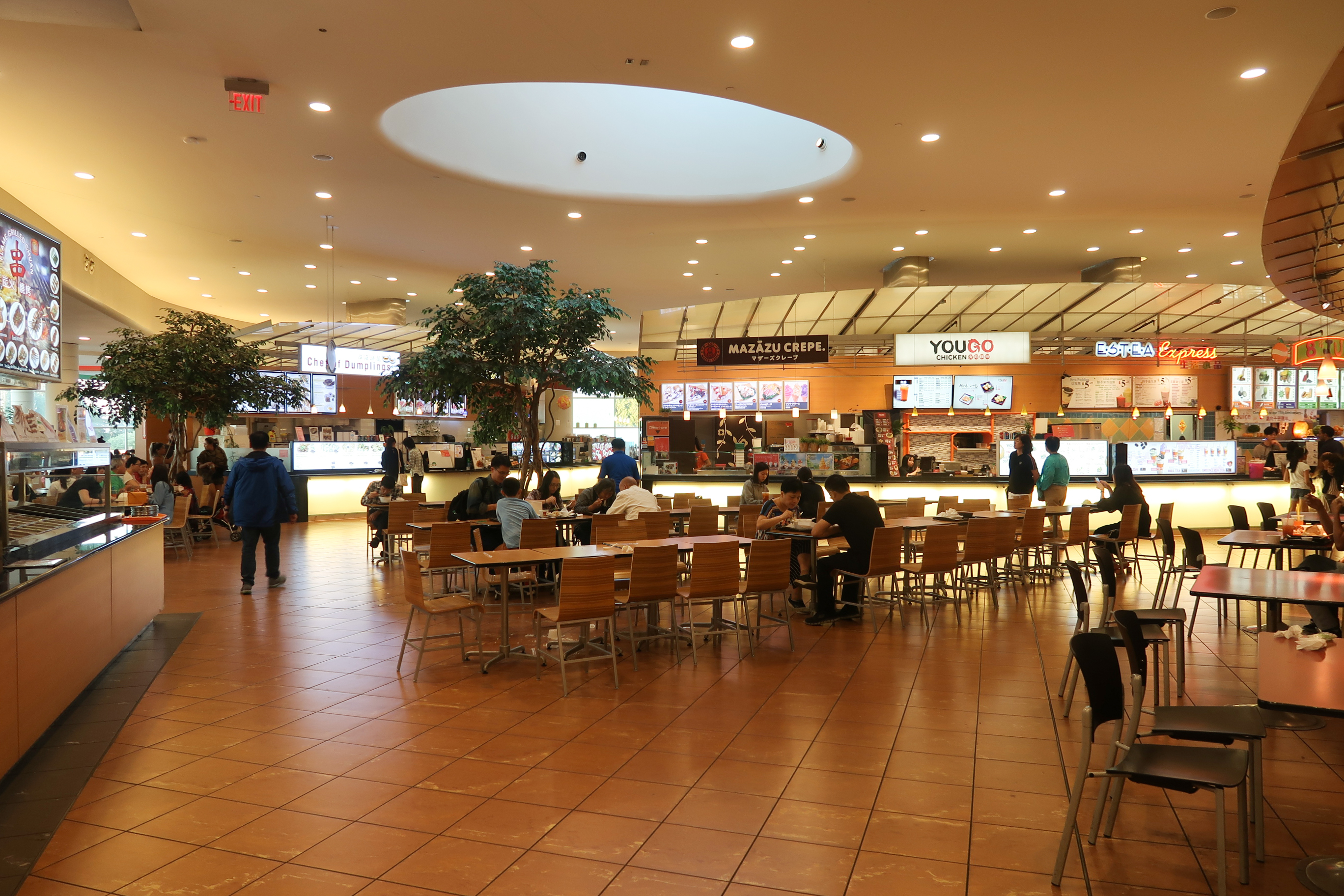
Aberdeen Centre level 3 food court

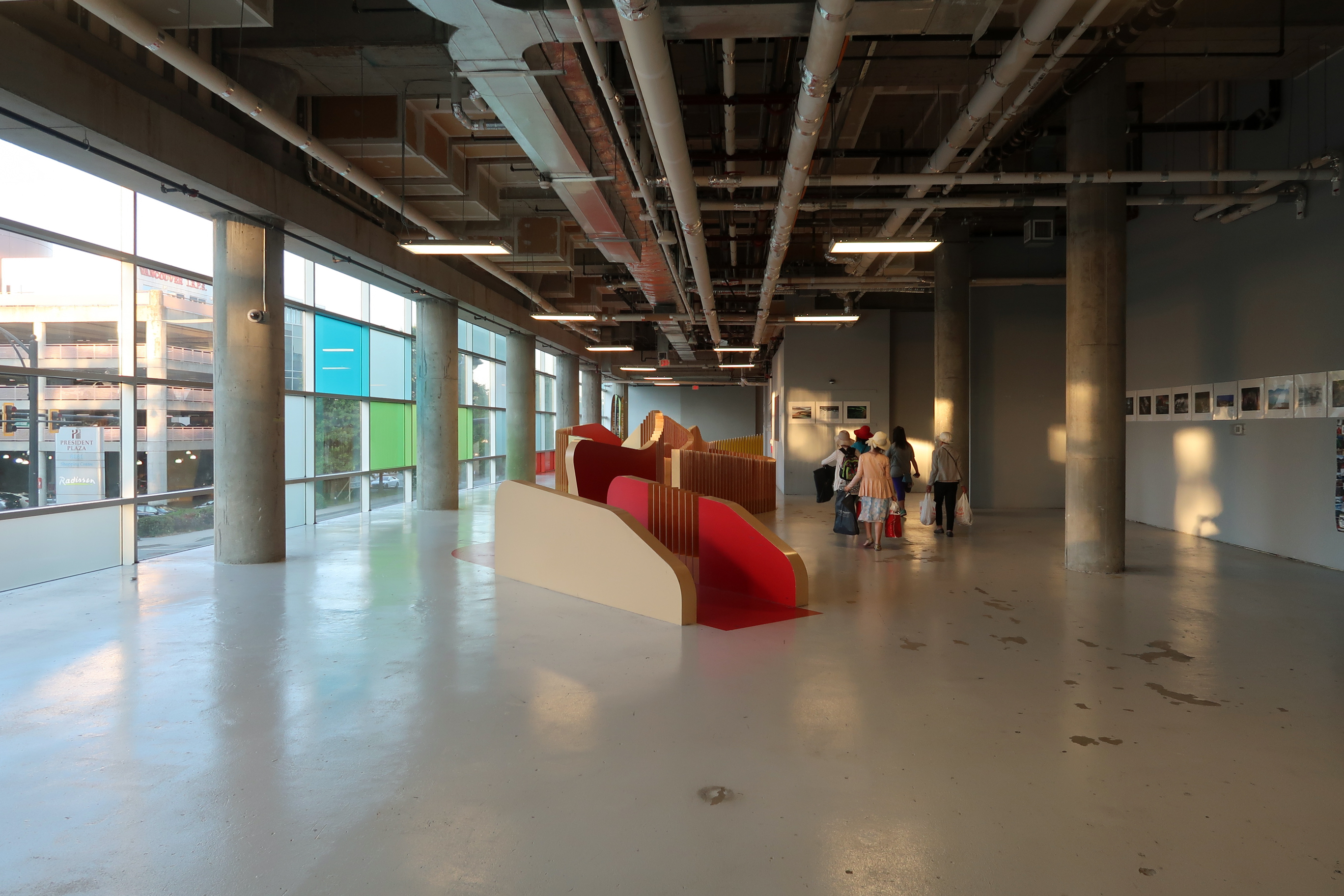
Aberdeen Square access to Aberdeen Centre

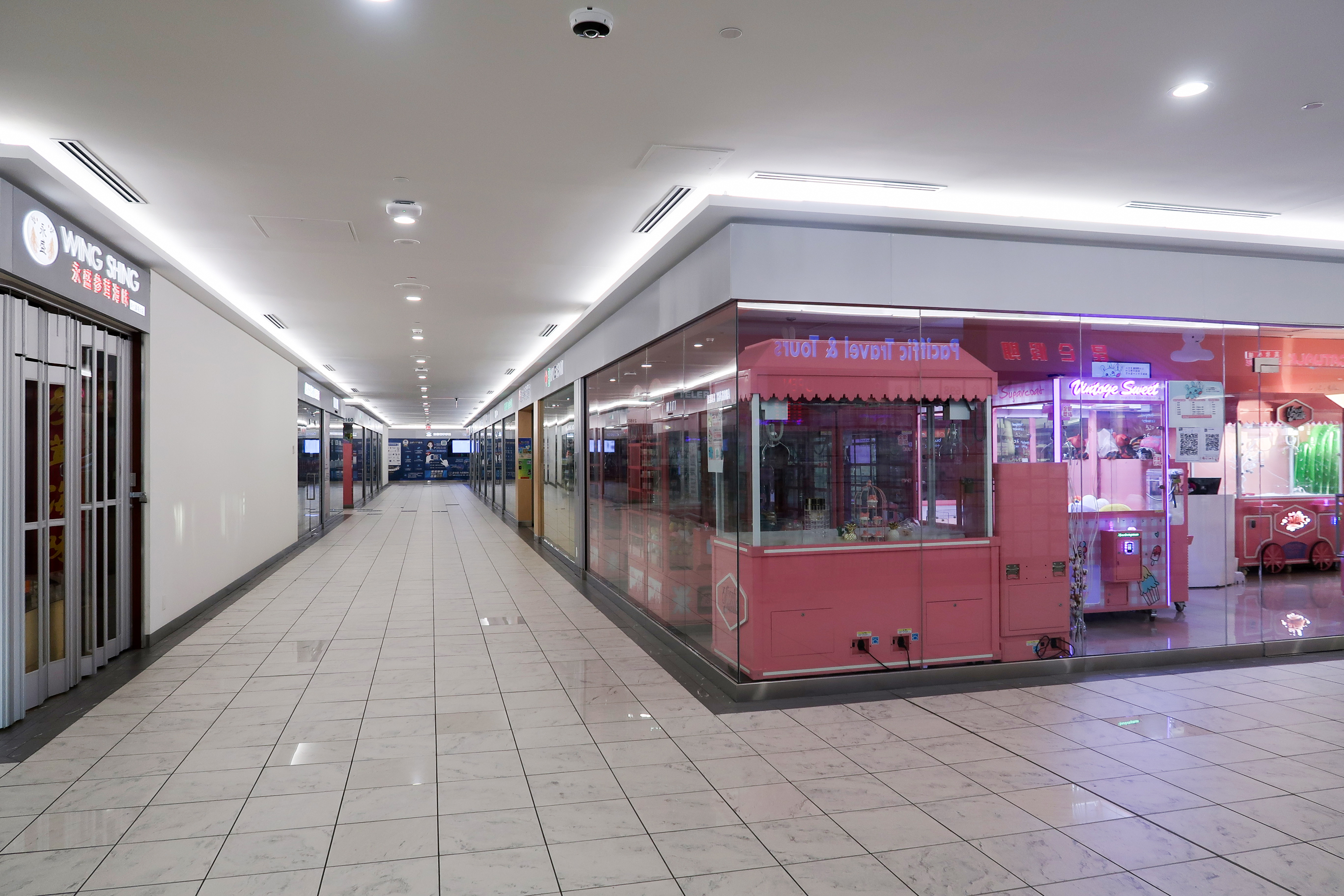
Aberdeen Square level 3 shops

== See also ==
- Chinese Canadians in British Columbia
- Golden Village (Richmond, British Columbia)
- Parker Place
