= CHKG-FM =

Fairchild Radio station in Vancouver

- Vancouver, British Columbia; Canada
- Broadcast area: Greater Vancouver
- Frequency: 96.1 MHz
- Branding: Fairchild Radio

Programming
- Languages: Cantonese (50%), Mandarin (40%), others (10%)
- Format: Multicultural

Ownership
- Owner: Fairchild Group; (Fairchild Radio (Vancouver FM) Ltd.)
- Sister stations: Fairchild TV; Talentvision

History
- First air date: September 6, 1997
- Call sign meaning: HKG for Hong Kong

Technical information
- Licensing authority: CRTC
- Class: C
- ERP: 46,000 watts; 100,000 watts maximum
- HAAT: 567 metres (1,860 ft)
- Transmitter coordinates: 49.353574°N 122.956696°W

Links
- Webcast: Listen live
- Website: fm961.com

CHKG-FM (96.1 FM) is a radio station in Vancouver, British Columbia, Canada. It airs mostly programs in Cantonese and Mandarin Chinese and is owned by the Fairchild Group. CHKG's studios are located at Aberdeen Centre in Richmond, while its transmitter is located atop Mount Seymour.

CHKG began broadcasting on September 6, 1997. It was the first multilingual FM station in Western Canada and was a joint venture of Fairchild and Edmonton broadcaster Roger Charest. During the day, CHKG-FM aired world music, and after 15:00, it aired Chinese-language hit music. This provided a 24-hour Chinese service when paired with Fairchild's CJVB (1470 AM), which broadcast during the day in Chinese. On March 2, 2026, Fairchild closed CJVB and moved most of its programs to CHKG-FM, resulting in 90 per cent of the station's broadcasting being in either Cantonese or Mandarin. Programs catering to other international communities in more than 15 languages make up the remainder of CHKG-FM's output.

== History ==
In 1995, the Fairchild Group, which already owned Vancouver multicultural station CJVB (1470 AM), and Roger Charest, owner of CKER in Edmonton, made a joint bid to the Canadian Radio-television and Telecommunications Commission (CRTC) to establish FM world music stations in Vancouver and Calgary. The application was approved in 1996, with the CRTC selecting it over bids from Telemedia for an alternative rock station and Radio One Vancouver Corporation for an "adult/pop talk" station because it found that the Vancouver radio market could not support another general-market station; CHMB (1320 AM) also proposed an ethnic station but withdrew its proposal.

CHKG-FM began broadcasting on September 6, 1997. It was the fifth Fairchild ethnic media service to open, and the first multilingual FM station in Western Canada. Programming was split between world music from 06:00 to 15:00 & Chinese hit radio the rest of the day, which together with CJVB's daytime Chinese programming provided a 24-hour Chinese service while also catering to other communities.

CHKG has held subsidiary communications multiplex operation authority from the CRTC over most of its history to broadcast a subcarrier-only service, originally in Korean and later in Punjabi. By the 2015 renewal, the SCMO service had returned to Korean.

On December 17, 2025, the CRTC approved an application by Fairchild Radio to remove the conditions on CHKG-FM that prevented it from carrying Chinese-oriented ethnic programs from 6 a.m. to 3 p.m. daily, thereby allowing 33 hours of Chinese-language programming to move across to FM and a related application to revoke the broadcasting license for CJVB. Fairchild cited financial losses and increasing interference to the AM signal as reasons for the application.

== Programming ==
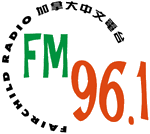
Original Fairchild Radio logo, used until September 2012.

Up until CJVB's revocation on March 2, 2026, CHKG operated with a program schedule that generally was the inverse of CJVB. During the day from Monday to Saturday, it aired world music programming and programs in Filipino, German, Hungarian, Italian, Khmer, Korean, Lao, Macedonian, Polish, Russian, Spanish, Thai, and Vietnamese. The weekly Asian Influence program presented the Chinese, Korean, and Japanese pop charts. The conditions of CHKG-FM's licence prevented it from airing Chinese-language programs between 6:00 a.m. and 3:00 p.m. After 3:00 p.m. and all day on Sundays, CHKG-FM presented Cantonese and Mandarin Chinese shows.

With the closure of CJVB, the new CHKG-FM program schedule includes Cantonese news, talk, and music programming between 5:00 a.m. and 5:30 p.m. on weekdays or 3:00 p.m. on weekends, as well as several weekend evening programs for a total of 86 1/2 hours per week. Mandarin programs occupy the 5:30 p.m.–8:30 p.m. slot on weekdays and weekend afternoons, as well as 11 p.m. to 5 a.m. overnight, for a total of 67 1/2 hours a week. The remaining ethnic programs broadcast from 8:30 to 11 p.m. on weekdays, 9:30 to 10 p.m. on Saturdays, and 8 to 10 p.m. on Sundays for a total of 15 hours a week. These programs are broadcast in Korean, Polish, Romanian, Hungarian, Macedonian, Ukrainian, Thai, Italian, Spanish, Filipino, Russian, German, Japanese, Vietnamese, Khmer, and Lao, as well as a program spotlighting Celtic music.
