= Talentvision =

Canadian Mandarin Chinese-language specialty TV channel

Talentvision 城市電視
- Country: Canada
- Headquarters: Aberdeen Centre, Richmond, British Columbia; Richmond Hill, Ontario

Programming
- Languages: Mandarin; Korean; Vietnamese
- Picture format: 1080i (HDTV)

Ownership
- Owner: Fairchild Group (80%); TVB (20%)
- Sister channels: Fairchild TV 1; Fairchild TV 2

History
- Launched: 1 February 1983; 43 years ago
- Former names: World View (1983–1985); Cathay TV (1985–1993)

Links
- Website: Talentvision (Chinese); Talentvision (English)

Chinese name
- Simplified Chinese: 城市电视
- Traditional Chinese: 城市電視
Transcriptions
Standard Mandarin
- Hanyu Pinyin: Chéngshì diànshì
- Wade–Giles: Chʻêngshih tienshih
Yue: Cantonese
- Jyutping: Sing^{4}si^{5} din^{6}si^{6}

Talentvision (Chinese: 城市電視) is a Canadian specialty TV channel primarily broadcasting in Mandarin Chinese. It is owned by the Vancouver-based Fairchild Media Group (a subsidiary of the Fairchild Group) and TVB. Talentvision's studios are located at Aberdeen Centre in the Golden Village district, along with Fairchild TV and Fairchild Radio, in Richmond, British Columbia. Talentvision features programming from China as well as Taiwan. It also has Korean- and Vietnamese-language blocks of programming.

Talentvision traces its origins to the regional pay TV service World View, which launched 1 February 1983. Though it had a multilingual remit, by far its strongest support was in the Chinese-speaking community, as was most of its programming. World View went into receivership 18 months after it debuted, following a decision by the Canadian Radio-television and Telecommunications Commission (CRTC) to award a national pay TV licence for a Chinese-language channel to Chinavision. Shareholders in World View, organized as Cathay International Television, bought the channel out of receivership in 1985 and relaunched it as Cathay TV with programming from Hong Kong's TVB as well as locally produced news and programs for Indo-Canadian viewers. As a premium channel, it was unable to sell advertising, causing a financial strain; this condition was removed in 1992.

In 1993, the Fairchild Group acquired Chinavision and Cathay International Television. It reorganized the channels as Fairchild TV and Talentvision, respectively. TVB programming moved to Fairchild TV; in 1998, Talentvision began broadcasting primarily in Mandarin Chinese to complement the primarily Cantonese programs on Fairchild TV. Talentvision became a national service in 2001. It broadcasts a daily Canadian newscast and a suite of locally produced programs, as well as entertainment programs from mainland China and Taiwan.

== History ==
=== World View and Cathay TV ===
In 1981, as part of its award of pay television licenses, the Canadian Radio-television and Telecommunications Commission (CRTC) heard an application from World View Television Ltd., headed by Bernard Liu, for a regional ethnic premium pay television channel to serve British Columbia. World View won the only regional license awarded for the province. The firm, largely funded by businessmen from Chinatown, proposed 92 hours a week of international programming in seven languages, including Chinese as well as Japanese, Italian, "Indian", and four Scandinavian languages. Movies were subtitled in English. After a preview of programs in December 1982, World View made its bow on 1 February 1983, the date when all the new pay services launched across Canada. It was the only one of the new pay-TV channels not distributed by satellite. From the beginning, World View was best supported by the Chinese-speaking community and to a lesser degree by the South Asian community on the Lower Mainland. By July, it had 9,000 subscribers but was scaling back its offerings in the European languages.

Later in 1983, World View applied to the CRTC again, this time to extend its service to Alberta and for a national ad-supported pay-TV channel, which would replace the regional licence. There were four applicants for ethnic service, two specifying multilingual schedules and two proposing all-Chinese formats. The CRTC denied World View's bid and approved Toronto-based Chinavision to begin broadcasting in May 1984. While it prevented Chinavision from broadcasting into British Columbia for two years to protect World View, the news was a bitter blow to Liu, who claimed the commission had "sign[ed] the death warrant of World View" and predicted that, once it entered the province, Chinavision—which could sell commercials—would force World View out of business. Citing a lack of support in the South Asian community, programming in those languages was cut from 26 hours a week to just 1, with the channel providing only 26 hours of Chinese-language programming in the interim. These cuts met with outcry from the Indo-Canadian community; a president of the Indo-Canadian Foundation noted that political turmoil in India and a limited inventory of programming had driven subscribers away. Liu departed the company, shortly followed by action by the British Columbia Development Corporation to demand repayment of its loan. On 17 August 1984, World View was placed into receivership to protect it from unsecured creditors who had filed lawsuits. Under the receiver, the station reduced its office space by half, its staff by two-fifths, and its programming expenditures.

Cathay International Television Ltd., in which 85 per cent ownership was held by former World View stockholders, beat an offer from Chinavision to buy World View from the receiver. Brian Sung, president of Cathay, promised the introduction of news programming from Hong Kong's TVB, more local programming, and more non-Chinese programming if the economic situation improved. A Cathay executive, Lucy Roschat, was the great-niece of TVB chairman Run Run Shaw. New programming was launched in January 1986, including 55 hours a week of Hong Kong programs, and the channel operated under the new name Cathay TV. However, the format remained all-Chinese, in contravention of a licence condition requiring it to broadcast in two languages; Sung said this was deliberate, noting that he could not "push water uphill". Chinavision also sought to enter British Columbia with the renewal of its licence. The matters were heard by the CRTC in January 1987; the commission allowed Chinavision to offer its service in British Columbia and ordered Cathay to offer the additional-language service, an order the company openly stated it would not follow. Though Cathay that April restored non-Chinese programming on an unscrambled basis while continuing to scramble programming in Chinese, the CRTC objected. The channel received a licence renewal from the commission for three and a half years with a requirement to provide 45 hours a week of South Asian programs. By 1989, Cathay aired an evening newscast in addition to news programs from Beijing and Hong Kong. By 1991, the channel also aired 15 hours a week each of programs in Hindi and Vietnamese and 10 hours in Thai.

By 1991, Cathay was CA$2 million in debt and entirely dependent on the $23.50 per month subscribers paid to view the service. The channel successfully petitioned the CRTC to let it sell advertising time, allowing advertisers to access the channel's 15,000 subscribers and market to the area's Chinese-speaking population.

=== Fairchild ownership ===
Talentvision's logo used from 1993 to 2013.

In 1993, Vancouver-based Chinese businessman Thomas Fung's Fairchild Group, together with Television Broadcasts International Limited, acquired Chinavision out of receivership and, in a separate transaction, Cathay TV. The two stations were subsequently reorganized: the regional television licence originally belonging to Cathay International Television was reorganized into Talentvision, while the national television licence originally belonging to Chinavision was reorganized into Fairchild TV. At the time, Talentvision aired programming in Chinese, Vietnamese, and Korean. Fung had connections to TVB; his father and younger brother had been directors in the company, and a Netherlands-domiciled TVB subsidiary owned 20 per cent of the resulting broadcaster. Most of the popular Hong Kong programs on Cathay moved to Fairchild TV, making them available to subscribers in Calgary, Edmonton and Toronto.

In 1995, as part of a proceeding to allocate a new broadcast TV station in Vancouver, Rogers Communications proposed buying Talentvision. Rogers planned to convert it from a cable TV channel to a broadcast station and air programs in as many as 15 languages. Sixty percent of the programs on the proposed broadcast station, CFMV, would be in Asian languages. Fairchild at the time believed it could be more efficient programming one channel, Fairchild TV, rather than two. Several Korean Canadians protested the Rogers bid because, in converting from a specialty channel to a broadcast service, Rogers proposed to cut Korean output from 14 hours a week to 30 minutes. However, Fairchild stated that it had no intention of giving up Talentvision's licence, leading the CRTC to deny the Rogers station application.

On 1 June 1998, Talentvision began broadcasting primarily in Mandarin Chinese. This responded to an increase in the Mandarin-speaking audience as immigration from mainland China increased. It began providing entertainment programming sourced from mainland China and Taiwan. Talentvision applied to the CRTC in 2000 to change its licence from a regional to a national service; the application was approved in May 2001.

In 2002, the Canadian Broadcast Standards Council ruled that a report Talentvision rebroadcast from China Central Television the preceding year, on an accused killer in China that was stated to be a member of Falun Gong, was biased and breached Canadian journalism codes. The channel received a short-term licence renewal in 2004 over shortfalls in Canadian content requirements between 1999 and 2002.

Between 2013 and 2016, Fairchild held a licence for a second ethnic channel, known as Talentvision II. In 2020, the CRTC revoked the Talentvision licence at Fairchild's request, allowing the channel to continue as an "exempt undertaking" with fewer than 200,000 subscribers.

== Local programming ==
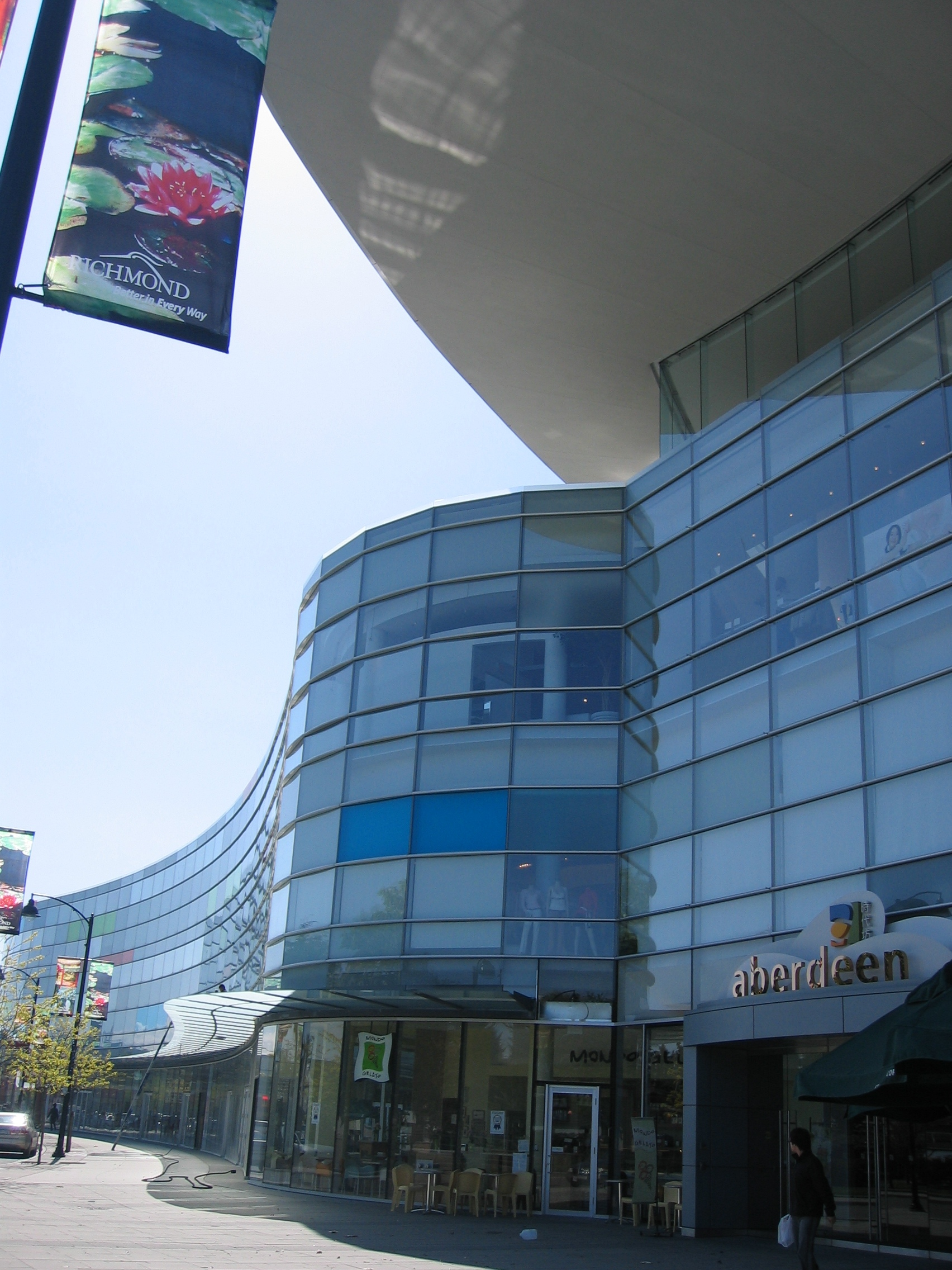
Since 2006, Talentvision's studio is located on the 3rd floor of Aberdeen Centre.

Talentvision produces a daily local news hour presented from the Richmond, British Columbia, studio. Talentvision's newscasts incorporate domestic Canadian stories, with segments concerning Western and Eastern Canada, as well as a segment of China, Hong Kong, and Taiwan news. Talentvision also airs foreign Mandarin newscasts from CCTV and Taiwan's CTV. The channel produces a range of current affairs programs as well as the entertainment guide City View, the lifestyle program Mandarin Profile, Everyday English, and the business program Expert Hour. In a 2017 analysis of Talentvision's locally produced programming, Shuyu Kong noted that many of the advertisements on Fairchild TV and Talentvision related to "various kinds of commercial activities and community businesses related to immigration and settling in Canada".

== Notable presenters ==
=== Current ===
- Angela Li — host, Urban Life (Ontario)
- Jenny Lin — host, Urban Life (Ontario)
- Anna Tian — host, Urban Life (Ontario)
- Yi Yi Wang — host, Urban Life (BC)
- Vicky Wu — host, Urban Life (BC)
- Kitty Yao — host, Urban Life (BC)
- Iris Yu — anchor

=== Former ===
- Alice Lin — host, Asian Magazine and Urban Life (BC)
- Elva Ni — host, City View (Ontario)
- Elly Leung — program host in the Cathay TV era
- Belinda Yan — host, City View (Ontario)
- Denise Liang — host, City View (Ontario)
- Rachel Zhang — host, Mandarin Profile and Urban Life (Ontario)

== Bibliography ==
- Kong, Shuyu (1 March 2017). "Mandarin Profile: Chinese-Language Television and Geo-Ethnic Storytelling". In Wong, Lloyd L. (ed.). Trans-Pacific Mobilities: The Chinese and Canada. University of British Columbia Press. ISBN 9780774833790. ProQuest 2134978404.
