= Omni News =

Canadian newscasts

- Type: Subsidiary
- Industry: Media
- Genre: News
- Founded: September 3, 1979; 47 years ago
- Headquarters: Rogers Building, Toronto, Ontario, Canada
- Area served: National, Regional
- Key people: Tony Staffieri - Rogers Communications Interim President & CEO; Jordan Banks - President of Rogers Sports & Media
- Production output: Television, radio, and internet news
- Owner: Rogers Sports & Media (Rogers Communications)
- Parent: OMNI Television
- Website: www.omnitv.ca

Omni News (styled as OMNI News) is the name of a news division that serves as the local and national newscasts in various languages on the Omni Television system in Canada.

== National ==
Omni Television produces daily newscasts in Italian, Punjabi, Arabic, Filipino, Cantonese, and Mandarin. National Newscasts was launched on November 7, 2011, as half-hour national newscasts in Cantonese, Mandarin and Punjabi on November 14. Cantonese and Mandarin national newscast were produced in the Toronto newsroom. While Punjabi's national newscast was produced in the Vancouver newsroom. On January 20, 2013, national newscasts in Cantonese and Mandarin were cancelled due to budget cuts. On May 7, 2015, Omni News programs were cancelled and were replaced with current affairs programs in British Columbia and Ontario on May 11. On September 1, 2017, OMNI Newscasts returned to the OMNI stations nationally as part of OMNI Regional, a service that provides multilingual shows, affairs shows, and news shows.

- Omni News: Italian Edition - weekdays at 16:00 PT/MT, 18:30 ET
- Omni News: Arabic Edition - weekdays at 17:00
- Omni News: Punjabi Edition - weeknights at 19:00
- Omni News: Filipino Edition - weeknights at 20:00
- Omni News: Cantonese Edition - weeknights at 21:00
- Omni News: Mandarin Edition - weeknights at 22:00

== East ==
Intro to OMNI News: Cantonese Edition; newscasts in other languages have the English names of their languages replacing the "Cantonese" in the intro from 2009 to 2018

Omni News logo used from 2002 to 2018

Omni News in Ontario began as local newscasts seen on Toronto's CFMT-DT. Before the station was renamed "Omni.1" on September 16, 2002, CFMT aired newscasts in Cantonese, Italian, and Portuguese on weeknights. In addition, the station also aired the weekend magazine programs Weekend Wide Angle Lens (in Mandarin) and South Asian Newsweek (in English).

The station's news operation was restructured into Omni News in conjunction with the September 16, 2002 launch of CJMT-DT ("Omni.2"). The Cantonese newscast was moved from CFMT to CJMT, and new Mandarin and South Asian weekday newscasts were also launched.

OMNI.1 and OMNI.2 moved to 33 Dundas Street East on October 19, 2009. "OMNI News" also updated the title and information bar design on the same day and set up a news live broadcast room on the first floor, using a window display style. Designed so that passers-by can watch the news production process. News and financial anchors report in the live broadcast room on the first floor, while sports anchors report on sports in the news centre on the third floor. During the initial opening of the new broadcasting building, Cantonese and Mandarin news speeches were subtitled in Chinese, but this was later abandoned.

The length of the weekday Mandarin newscast has been half an hour from its launch on September 3, 1979, to April 30, 2010, and was extended to one hour on May 3, 2010.

With the launch of OMNI's national newscasts on November 7, 2011, OMNI.2 newscasts were reduced to 30 minutes and aired right after the national newscasts. Cantonese and Mandarin national newscasts were produced in the Toronto newsroom.

On January 20, 2013, the national newscasts in Mandarin and Cantonese were cancelled due to budget cuts.

On April 7, 2014, Rogers split the Chinese news hours on OMNI.2. The original 17:00 and 17:30 news hours were renamed into Cantonese and Mandarin "新聞快報", which mainly reported news from China, Hong Kong, and Taiwan. 19:00 and 19:30 newscasts were renamed to "晚間新聞” and simulcasted on CHNM-DT, restoring Chinese national news in disguise.

On May 7, 2015, Rogers announced a restructuring of Omni News programs as part of cutbacks that led to the loss of 110 jobs across the company. The existing newscasts would be replaced by new public affairs-oriented programs produced in Cantonese and Mandarin, on May 11. The new programs featured in-depth discussion of local issues but did not feature original news reporting.

As of 2024, the two Omni Television stations produce the following local newscasts:

=== Omni.1 ===
- Focus Portuguese - weekends at 17:00

=== Omni.2 ===
- Focus Punjabi - weeknights at 19:30
- Focus Cantonese (OMNI都市聚焦) - weeknights at 21:30
- Focus Mandarin (OMNI都会聚焦) - weeknights at 22:30

== Prairie ==
Omni News in Alberta was launched on September 15, 2008, in conjunction with CJCO-DT in Calgary and CJEO-DT in Edmonton. The two stations produced three nightly television newscasts aimed at the Cantonese, Mandarin, and South Asian communities across the province. While there were news gathering teams in both Edmonton and Calgary, the newscasts were presented from the Citytv/Omni Television studios in Downtown Edmonton.

Omni Alberta ceased production of its local newscasts on September 15, 2011 as part of a reorganization at Rogers Media. National newscasts in Cantonese, Mandarin, and Punjabi, as well as Omni News: South Asian Edition produced from Toronto, are now seen on Omni Alberta; these newscasts feature one or two stories from Alberta per day. Production of local content at Omni Alberta ended on May 31, 2013.

Since 2024, Omni Alberta simulcasts a Cantonese public affairs program called 時事對對碰 from CHKF-FM as Focus Cantonese and Shaam Wala Show from CKER-FM as Focus Punjabi.

Until their cancellation, Omni Alberta produced the following newscasts:

- Omni News: Mandarin Edition - weekdays at 17:00
- Omni News: South Asian Edition - weeknights at 20:00
- Omni News: Cantonese Edition - weeknights at 21:00

Since 2024:

- Focus Punjabi - weeknights at 19:30
- Focus Cantonese (時事對對碰) - weeknights at 21:30

== Pacific ==
CHNM-DT in Vancouver, British Columbia, produces the following local newscasts:

- Focus Punjabi - weeknights at 19:30
- Focus Cantonese (OMNI都會聚焦) - weeknights at 21:30
- Focus Mandarin (OMNI都会聚焦) - weeknights at 22:30

CHNM's newscasts were known as Channel M News from June 30, 2003, to September 14, 2008. During those years, the station also had a reciprocal agreement with Vancouver's CTV station, CIVT-DT, which allowed the two stations to share news resources. The station's newscasts were rebranded to Omni News on September 15, 2008, following the approval of its sale to Rogers, and its news sharing agreement with CIVT also ended.

The station also used to produce newscasts in Tagalog. Following the station's acquisition by Rogers, the production of those newscasts were handed over to independent production companies.

Cantonese news has maintained a one-hour broadcast from its inception until 2010. It was initially broadcast at 20:00, later changed to 21:00, and then to 17:00 on March 29, 2010. On May 17, 2010, a half-hour Cantonese late-night newscast was added at 23:00. On January 20, 2013, the late-night newscast was moved to 20:30.

Mandarin and Punjabi news were each given half an hour at the beginning and were later extended to one hour each on September 3, 2007. In addition, after joining OMNI, the station also began broadcasting a weekend Mandarin news magazine produced in Toronto and hosted by Grant Guo at 20:00 on Saturdays.

With the launch of OMNI's national newscasts on November 7, 2011, OMNI BC's newscasts were reduced to 30 minutes and aired right after the national newscasts. In addition, the Punjabi national newscast was produced by the OMNI BC news department. On January 20, 2013, the national newscasts in Cantonese and Mandarin were cancelled due to budget cuts, while the Punjabi newscast was retained.

On May 7, 2015, Rogers announced a restructuring of Omni News programs as part of cutbacks that led to the loss of 110 jobs across the company. The existing newscasts would be replaced by new public affairs-oriented programs produced in Cantonese, Mandarin, and Punjabi on May 11. The new programs featured in-depth discussion of local issues but did not feature original news reporting.

== See also ==
- CityNews, the news operation of sister station Citytv
