= CJMT-DT =

Television station in Toronto, Canada

- Toronto, Ontario; Canada
- Channels: Digital: 26 (UHF); Virtual: 40
- Branding: Omni Television

Programming
- Affiliations: 40.1: Omni Television

Ownership
- Owner: Rogers Sports & Media; (Rogers Media Inc.)
- Sister stations: TV: CFMT-DT, CITY-DT, Sportsnet Ontario; Radio: CFTR, CHFI, CJCL, CKIS

History
- First air date: September 16, 2002
- Former call signs: CJMT-TV (2002–2011)
- Former channel numbers: Analog: 44 (UHF, 2002–2004), 69 (UHF, 2004–2011); Digital: 44 (UHF, 2008–2011), 51 (UHF, 2011–2012), 40 (UHF, 2012–2020); Virtual: 69 (2008–2012)
- Call sign meaning: "Multicultural Television" (disambiguation of sister station CFMT-DT)

Technical information
- Licensing authority: CRTC
- ERP: 14.6 kW
- HAAT: 506 m (1,660 ft)
- Transmitter coordinates: 43°38′33″N 79°23′14″W
- Translator(s): see § Transmitters

Links
- Website: Omni Television Ontario

CJMT-DT (channel 40) is a television station in Toronto, Ontario, Canada. It is one of two flagship stations of the Canadian multilingual network Omni Television, a division of Rogers Sports & Media, and is operated alongside sister Omni outlet CFMT-DT (channel 47) and Citytv flagship CITY-DT (channel 57). The three stations share studios at the Rogers Building in downtown Toronto; CJMT-DT's transmitter is located atop the CN Tower.

The station was launched on September 16, 2002, as a sister to CFMT; at the same time, Rogers launched Omni Television as a blanket brand for the stations by branding the new station as Omni.2, followed by re-branding CFMT as Omni.1 as well as the rest of Canada in subsequent years. The two stations are distinguished by their service of different cultural groups; CJMT caters primarily on Asian cultures (including programming in South Asian and Chinese languages) while CFMT focuses on European (particularly Western and Eastern) and Latin American cultures.

== History ==
Omni.2 logo used from 2002 to 2011.

Omni Television Logo used from 2011 to 2018.

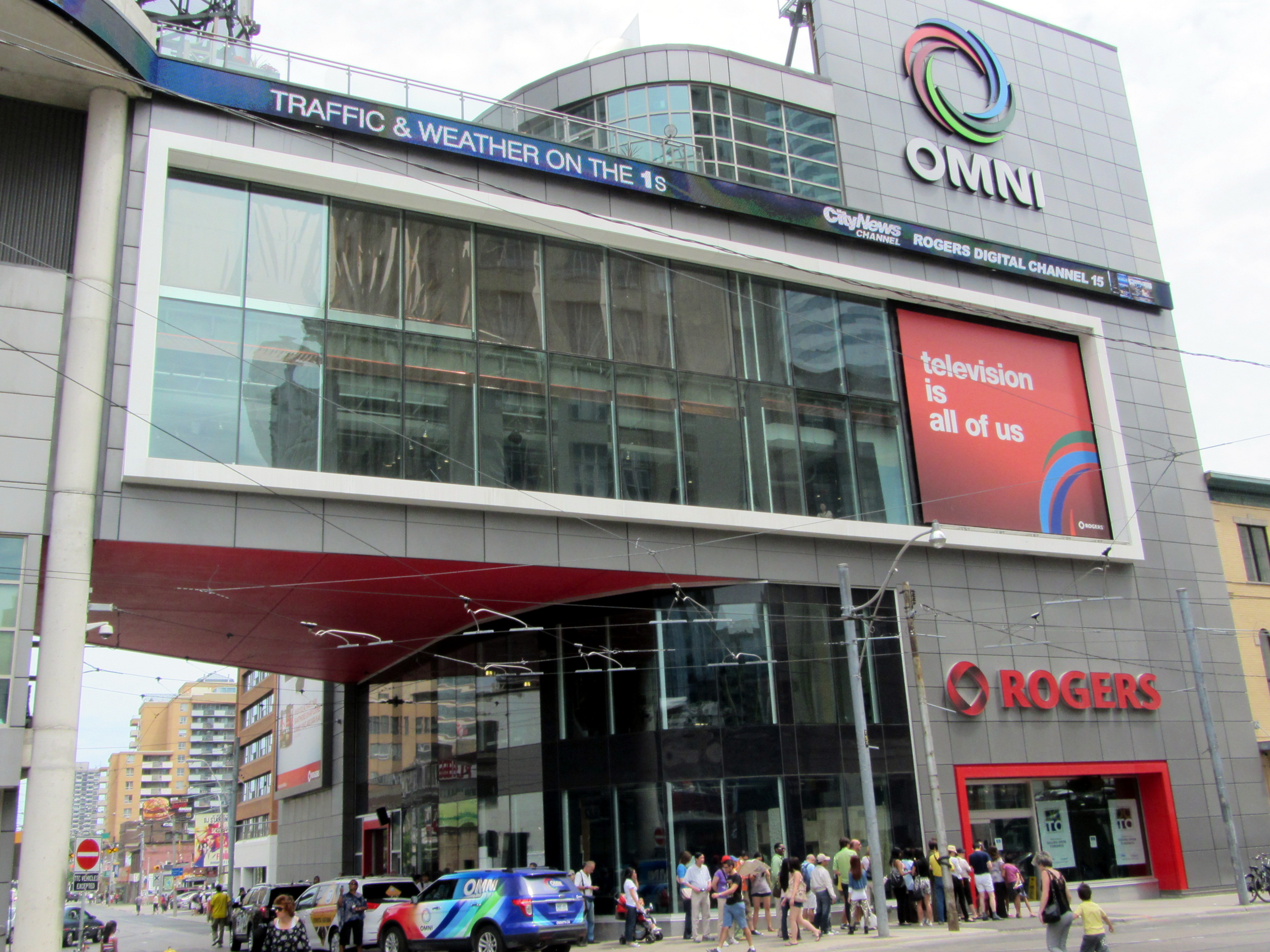
Omni Television's studios at the Rogers Media Complex on 33 Dundas Street East facing Sankofa Square in Toronto, used from 2009 to 2025

The station signed on the air on September 16, 2002, broadcasting on UHF channel 44. In 2004, CJMT moved its channel allocation to UHF channel 69. The station was licensed by the Canadian Radio-television and Telecommunications Commission (CRTC) as part of the same process that approved independent station CKXT-TV (channel 52, now defunct) and was proposed to be known as "CFMT Too". The "J" in its callsign has no particular meaning, except that it was an available callsign that maintained the "MT" lettering (standing for "Multicultural Television") from CFMT (CJMT was formerly the callsign of a now-defunct AM radio station in Chicoutimi, Quebec).

On May 19, 2005, the CRTC approved an application by Rogers Broadcasting Limited to operate a transitional digital television programming undertaking at Ottawa, operating on channel 66C with an average effective radiated power of 7,110 watts. On October 8, 2007, Rogers announced that the operations of the two Omni stations would relocate from 545 Lake Shore Boulevard West to 33 Dundas Street East. CJMT and CFMT integrated their operations into the building – which it shares with City flagship CITY-DT, which moved into the facility the previous month – on October 19, 2009.

Omni Television and Citytv moved their operations to the Rogers Building at Bloor and Mount Pleasant in March 2025.

== Programming ==
As a multicultural station, CJMT airs programming in the South Asian languages (such as Urdu and Hindi), as well as in Mandarin, Cantonese, Japanese, Korean, Somali and Pashto. As with its sister station CFMT, CJMT also aired syndicated English-language programming until September 25, 2015. The original series Metropia was also broadcast on the station, with repeats on CFMT. In 2014, CJMT began to regularly simulcast CBS late-night talk shows Late Show with David Letterman and The Late Late Show with Craig Ferguson, both of which moved from the main Omni television channel. Both shows have since concluded, with their successors airing on Global and CTV respectively. The first season of the Fox series Empire also aired on CJMT (its second season moved to City).

=== Sports programming ===
During the 2007 season, CJMT began airing late-afternoon NFL games, usually the alternate to whatever aired on Sportsnet and CKVU-DT in Vancouver. These games were moved to CITY-DT as of the 2008 season. Rights to these games were later assumed by CTV as of the 2017 season. During the 2014 season, CJMT aired several Thursday Night Football games in simulcast with Sportsnet and CBS.

On June 27, 2013, CJMT broadcast Mandarin-language coverage of a Toronto Blue Jays Major League Baseball game started by Taiwanese player Chien-Ming Wang. This event marked the first ever Canadian MLB telecast in the language.

=== Newscasts ===
CJMT-DT broadcasts five hours of locally produced newscasts each week (with one hour each weekday). The station carries two local newscasts aimed at Southern Ontario's Asian demographic, presented in the Mandarin and Cantonese languages.

CJMT launched its news operation the day the station began operations on September 16, 2002, with newscasts airing in Mandarin and South Asian languages as well as a Cantonese language newscast that moved to the station from sister station CFMT. The South Asian edition had previously aired once a week and was known as South Asian Newsweek. The South Asian newscast was cancelled in June 2013 due to corporate cutbacks at Rogers Media, that included the shutdown of production operations at CJMT's sister stations, CJCO-DT in Calgary and CJEO-DT in Edmonton.

The length of the weekday Mandarin news program has been half an hour from its launch on September 3, 1979, to April 30, 2010, and was extended to one hour on May 3, 2010.

In September 2017, with the launch of Omni National, Omni 2 started production of news programs in Mandarin, Cantonese, and Punjabi.

==== Notable former on-air staff ====
- Stanley So (蘇凌峰) – former anchor of OMNI News: Cantonese Edition

== Technical information ==
=== Subchannel ===
Subchannel of CJMT-DT
Subchannel	Res.	Short name	Programming
40.1	1080i	OMNI 2	Omni Television

=== Analog-to-digital conversion ===
CJMT shut down its analog signal, over UHF channel 69, on August 31, 2011, the official date on which full-power television stations in larger Canadian television markets transitioned from analog to digital broadcasts under federal mandate. The conversion coincided with a change in transmitters, from the analog transmitter atop First Canadian Place to a digital transmitter on the CN Tower alongside its Rogers Media sister stations.

The station's digital signal remained on its pre-transition UHF channel 51, using virtual channel 69. In August 2012, the digital signal relocated to UHF channel 40, after that channel was vacated due to the shutdown of CKXT-DT. The virtual channel was remapped to physical digital channel 40 with the relocation of the digital signal to that frequency.

=== Transmitters ===
Station	City of licence	Channel (RF / VC)	ERP	HAAT	Transmitter coordinates	CRTC
CJMT-DT-1	London	20 (UHF); 20	14 kW	197.6 m (648 ft)	42°57′16″N 81°21′17″W	2010-948
CJMT-DT-2	Ottawa	20 (UHF); 14	15 kW	202.3 m (664 ft)	45°13′2″N 75°33′49″W	2003-602
