= CJVB =

Fairchild Radio station in Vancouver

- Vancouver, British Columbia; Canada
- Broadcast area: Greater Vancouver
- Frequency: 1470 kHz
- Branding: Fairchild Radio

Programming
- Format: Multicultural

Ownership
- Owner: Fairchild Group; (Fairchild Radio Group Ltd.)
- Sister stations: CHKG-FM

History
- First air date: June 18, 1972
- Last air date: March 2, 2026
- Call sign meaning: Original owner Jan van Bruchem

Technical information
- Class: B
- Power: 50,000 watts
- Transmitter coordinates: 49°11′35″N 123°01′21″W

CJVB (1470 AM) was a radio station in Vancouver, British Columbia, Canada, which broadcast multilingual programming. Owned by the Fairchild Group, the station broadcast with a power of 50,000 watts, using two different directional patterns for daytime and nighttime operation. CJVB's studios and transmitter were located in Richmond.

Operation began as a 10,000-watt station at the same transmitter site in 1972, with a power increase to 50 kW in 1979. The station was originally licensed to Jan van Bruchem, whose initials gave CJVB its call letters. CJVB was the third multicultural radio station in Canada, following CHIN in Toronto and CFMB in Montreal. It was also the first radio station in the Vancouver area to broadcast in AM stereo. Fairchild acquired the station in 1993. CJVB aired primarily Chinese (Cantonese and Mandarin) programming from Monday through Saturday and programs in other languages on Sunday. In 1997, CHKG-FM went on the air as a primarily music-based service, complementing CJVB by airing programs in languages other than Chinese when CJVB was on the air in that language and vice versa.

CJVB closed on March 2, 2026, after Fairchild successfully petitioned the Canadian Radio-television and Telecommunications Commission to let it move 33 hours a week of Chinese-language programs to CHKG-FM citing financial issues and increased interference.

== History ==
=== Van Bruchem ownership ===
Jan van Bruchem immigrated from the Netherlands to the Toronto area in 1952 and began working part-time at a 250-watt radio station in Barrie. The owner of that station needed someone to do a Dutch-language program to thank farmers who had cleared marsh land in the area. Van Bruchem agreed, and at the petition of the community, a Dutch-language show became a regular fixture on the station and was syndicated to others; by the late 1960s, 124 stations aired his show.

At the end of the 1960s, van Bruchem turned his attention to starting a multicultural radio station somewhere in Canada. However, stations were already set up in Toronto and Montreal, and only one market looked remotely large enough to support such a station under the rules of the Canadian Radio and Television Commission (CRTC). His first CRTC application was rejected on the grounds that Vancouver did not have the requisite 150,000 people for such a licence to be granted. The main reason was a lack of statistics on new arrivals to Canada; as a result, van Bruchem hit the streets, documenting ethnic restaurants and Sikh temples. These figures and updated data from Statistics Canada accompanied Van Bruchem's 1971 bid for an ethnic station in Vancouver, under the corporate aegis of Great Pacific Broadcasting Ltd. Another reason given was that stations on the U.S. side of the border were airing 23 hours a week of foreign-language programming, most of it organized by Vancouver residents who could not get air time on Canadian stations.

In late November 1971, the CRTC awarded the licence to van Bruchem, who sold his house in Thornhill, Ontario, and moved to Vancouver to start the station. From studios at 814 Richards Street, CJVB went on the air on June 18, 1972, broadcasting in English and 17 foreign languages; it also aired a daily newscast from the Dutch international radio service. The young CJVB produced more than 98 percent of its own programming, 90 percent of which was live. It took advertisers several years to be convinced of the efficacy of advertising on an ethnic station, with van Bruchem noting in 1992 that the station had a "meagre beginning" as a result. However, the station eventually prospered. After a 1974 application to add a rebroadcaster in the Fraser Valley was denied, in December 1979, it boosted its power from 10,000 to 50,000 watts. The station's English-language output also included such specialties as big band music.

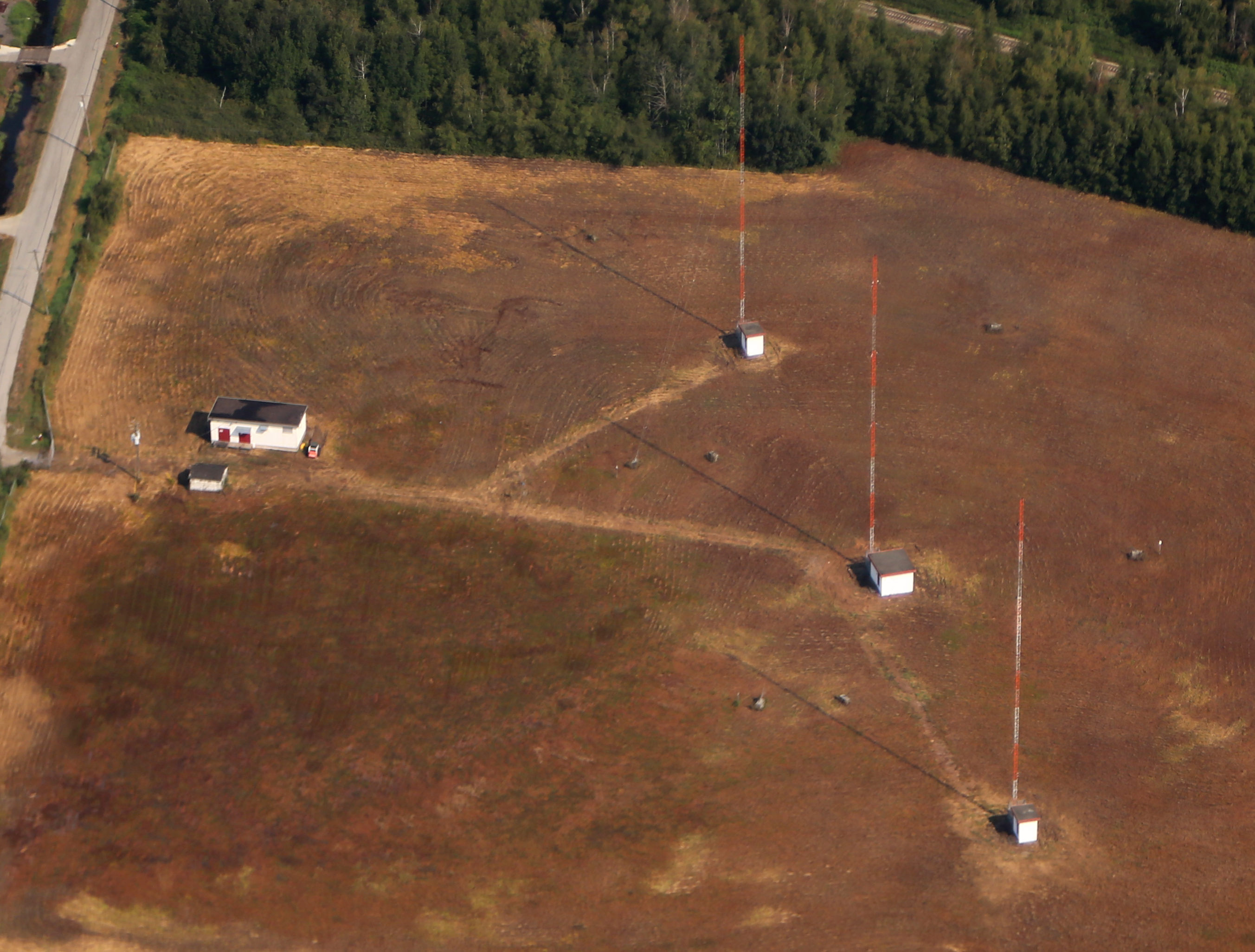
An aerial view of the CJVB tower site in Richmond

Two months after the station went on the air, a new program started on CJVB, one that would remain a fixture for 20 years: Overseas Chinese Voice. Chinese programming came to dominate CJVB as the Chinese population on the Lower Mainland grew rapidly; by the late 1980s, Overseas Chinese Voice was broadcasting for twelve hours a day. Indian, Greek, and Italian programming was also extensively featured.

In 1983, CJVB was the first station in town to begin broadcasting in AM stereo using the C-QUAM system, beating out CKWX by six days, though behind CKOV in Kelowna. In 1992, the daytime coverage pattern of the AM transmitter was altered to improve service to the south.

=== Fairchild ownership ===
In 1992, a 63-year-old van Bruchem opted to plan for his retirement. He reached a deal to sell CJVB for $5.1 million to Y.B.C. Holdings Ltd., a consortium of five mostly Chinese Canadian interests: Wardley Canada, a subsidiary of Hongkong Bank of Canada; 1320 Communications Ltd., owned by CHQM-AM-FM founder Jack Stark; Fairchild Media; Oakbridge Investments; and Anson Holdings. The Chinese Canadian National Council protested the proposed buyer over concerns that there would be changes in programming.

The sale closed in January 1993, and at that time, there were major changes in Chinese-language programming. Overseas Chinese Voice, having programmed half of the station under contract for two decades, was out, and Canadian Chinese Radio (Vancouver) Corp. was in. The main face of the new Chinese-language programming was Michael Ng, a former anchor for Radio Television Hong Kong. (Overseas Chinese Voice then started Vancouver's second multicultural station, CHMB (1320 AM).) The last edition of van Bruchem's Dutch Treat program aired in late March.

In 1995, Fairchild and Roger Charest, owner of CKER in Edmonton, made a joint bid to the CRTC to establish FM world music stations in Vancouver and Calgary. The application was approved in 1996, and in 1997, CHKG-FM 96.1 began broadcasting.

On December 17, 2025, the CRTC approved an application by Fairchild Radio to revoke the broadcasting license for CJVB and a related application to remove the conditions on CHKG-FM that prevented it from carrying Chinese-oriented ethnic programs from 6 a.m. to 3 p.m. daily, thereby allowing 33 hours of Chinese-language programming to move across to FM. Fairchild cited financial losses and increasing interference to the AM signal as reasons for the application. The licence was revoked on March 5, 2026.

== Programming ==
Six days a week, CJVB devoted 21 hours of its air time to assorted Chinese-language news, talk, and music programming, followed by additional Cantonese- and Mandarin-language religious programs, as well as an Italian-language program and the Putumayo World Music Hour. On Sundays, the station broadcast blocks of other programs, including shows in Filipino, German, Hungarian, Japanese, Khmer, Korean, Lao, Macedonian, Polish, Thai, and Vietnamese, as well as the Indigenous program Turtle Island Radio and shows spotlighting Celtic and world music.
