= Rui En =

Singaporean actress and singer (born 1981)

- Born: Loh Rui En; 29 January 1981 (age 45); Singapore
- Education: Singapore Chinese Girls' School; Raffles Junior College
- Alma mater: Nanyang Technological University (Bachelor of Business)
- Occupations: Actress; singer; host
- Years active: 2002–present
- Awards: Full list
- Musical career
- Genres: Mandopop, R&B
- Instrument: Vocals

Chinese name
- Chinese: 瑞恩
- Hanyu Pinyin: Ruì ēn

Birth name
- Traditional Chinese: 盧瑞恩
- Simplified Chinese: 卢瑞恩
- Hanyu Pinyin: Lú Ruì'ēn

Rui En (born Loh Rui En on 29 January 1981) is a Singaporean actress, singer and host and was once managed by Hype Records.

One of Singapore's most successful actresses, Rui En has won two Star Awards for Best Actress. She is also one of the few artistes to have received the Top 10 Most Popular Female Artistes award for 10 consecutive years, earning the Star Awards for All-Time Favourite Artiste award at the Star Awards 2016.

== Early life ==
Rui En was born on 29 January 1981. Her father worked as a property agent, and her mother is a housewife. Her parents divorced when she was 17; her father remarried three years later, and her mother remarried in 2007. While growing up, she shared in a 2008 The Straits Times interview, she used to smoke and drink socially to cope with the insecurity and instability she felt from her broken home, and after quitting ballet as a co-curricular activity (CCA) in secondary school. She subsequently kicked the habit in 2004.

Rui En studied at Singapore Chinese Girls' School for both her primary and secondary education, and subsequently at Raffles Junior College (RJC). She graduated from Nanyang Technological University with a Bachelor of Business in 2004.

== Career ==
=== Modelling and music career ===
Rui En first started modelling after she completed her A Levels in RJC in 1999, and was managed by Phantom Management. In 2001, she was featured in a SingTel ad which propelled her into the limelight and earned her a feature in Singapore's edition of FHM. She subsequently signed on with Hype Records's subsidiary, Artistes Network.

Rui En ventured into Taiwan in 2002 with the stage name 芮恩 (pinyin: Ruì'ēn). She made her first appearance as the female lead in label mate Jay Chou's music video for "Secret Code" and went on to co-endorse Panasonic GD68 with him. Rui En subsequently released her debut regional Chinese album, Rui Σn vol. 01, in the same year under the co-production of Hype Records and Alfa Music. Chou composed the song White Feather (白色羽毛) which was released in her debut album, Rui Σn vol. 01.

Rui En was nominated as the Best Local Singer in the Singapore Hits Awards 2003 and was selected alongside Taufik Batisah to perform both the English and Mandarin versions of the 2005 National Day Parade's theme song, Reach Out for the Skies.

After a six years' break, Rui En released her second Chinese album in late 2008 under Hype Records, titled United Nations. This album was only released in Singapore, with all lyrics penned by Rui En herself. Since then, she resumed the use of her original name, 瑞恩. In April 2009, Rui En was invited to perform at Singapore Day 2009 at London's Hampton Court Palace, a yearly event organised by the Overseas Singaporean Unit in the Prime Minister's Office to engage overseas Singaporeans.

=== Acting career ===
Rui En made her acting debut in MediaCorp drama, No Problem, in 2002. She landed her first leading role in 2005, with A Promise for Tomorrow. In the following year, she was identified as one of the most promising young actresses in the Singapore Entertainment Industry by local entertainment magazine I-Weekly and was hence labelled as one of the Seven Princesses of Mediacorp.

In 2004, Rui En took over Steph Song's role in the English sitcom Achar! for the second season after Song left the series after falling out with the male lead, Jas Arora. However, after reviewing her performance in that sitcom, Rui En felt that she was acting just for fame and popularity as a clutch to her broken family situation. Thereafter, in addition to quitting smoking and drinking, she decided to stop taking up roles that require kissing and/or intimate scenes. Thus despite being nominated for the Best Newcomer Award in 2004's Star Awards, she was limited in the choice of roles she could take on.

In March 2008, Rui En was involved in a high-profile rejection of the role as an ambitious businesswoman struggling with mental illness in The Defining Moment, which subsequently went to Fann Wong instead. She was reported to have rejected the role due to a rape scene in the script as part of her stance against revealing, kissing or intimate scenes and has been criticised by some as unprofessional. She is reported to have been blacklisted by some producers after this role-rejection incident. After playing a social service worker and AIDS patient in By My Side in 2008, Rui En started to gain recognition, winning one of the eight 'Top 8 Likable Female Lead Characters' awards with her only production that year.

In 2010, Rui En was labelled as one of the 10 Faces to watch in 2010 by MediaCorp's Buzz. Rui En also won several awards for the characters she portrayed, for instance her role as Zhang Luoyun in My School Daze which emerged as the 'Top 10 Favourite Female Characters' in Star Awards 2010, and Lin Jiaqi in The Dream Catchers which emerged as the 'Top 5 Favourite Female Characters'.

In 2011, Rui En re-iterated her stance against revealing, kissing or intimate scenes after interviews for On the Fringe implied that Rui En had filmed a rape scene for the show. Rui En clarified that the so called rape scenes only consisted of her being drugged and was brushed on the hair and face. Rui En won the 'Most Favourite Female Character' award with her role as Yang Xiaodong in Happy Family. Rui En was also credited for her outstanding performance in portraying a widow in With You, winning the 'Best Actress' award in Star Awards 2011.

Rui En was awarded the 'Best Actress in Leading Role' at the 2012 Asian Television Awards, for her role as a tough cop in crime drama Unriddle 2. She went on to win her third acting award in the following year at the Star Awards 2013 for the same role in Unriddle 2, earning her second 'Best Actress Award' at Star Awards. In 2013, Rui En was appointed the spokesperson for L'Oréal Paris Youth Code, making her the first Singaporean spokesperson for the international cosmetics brand.

In addition to her roles in dramas, Rui En has starred in a three-part docudrama produced by Channel NewsAsia, as one of Singapore's pioneer painters, Georgette Chen. The English-language series, which was also adapted into Mandarin, aired on Channel NewsAsia, MediaCorp Channel 5 and MediaCorp Channel 8 in April 2015.

In 2016, Rui En gained seven kilograms for her role as a housewife in If Only I Could and was fat shamed afterwards. She spoke out against fat shaming in 2017.

Rui En received the All-Time Favourite Artiste award in the Star Awards 2016 after winning the Top 10 Most Popular Female Artistes award from 2005 to 2016 respectively with Qi Yuwu.

In 2021, Rui En left Artistes Network.

== Personal life ==
Rui En revealed in an interview that her parents divorced when she was 17.

In January 2016, Rui En was also involved in a hit and run accident. There were no casualties involved, and both parties agreed to make a private settlement.

On 13 April 2016, Rui En was involved in a car accident entering a carpark near her home when her car knocked over a stationary motorcycle. On 14 April, it was reported that Rui En was assisting the police with investigations into the accident. She subsequently apologised and responded with an official statement regarding the accident. The owner of the motorcycle accepted Rui En's apology through Wanbao on 15 April. For this incident, Rui En was fined S$700.

=== Community work ===
Rui En is the theme song singer for The Community Chest of Singapore. The song, titled "Listen to Your Heart", has been released in the form of EP in years 2003 and 2009.

She is also a regular volunteer at "Beyond Social Services". She has also volunteered for several children welfare organizations. Notably, in 2016, she volunteered her services together with her fan club to commemorate their 9th anniversary.

== Filmography ==
=== Film ===
Year	Title	Role	Notes	Ref.
2008	Sense of Home: Kampung Kid	Caroline	Telemovie	
2019	Old Is Gold: The Bliss Keeper (老友万岁之守护幸福)	Han Xinxin	Telemovie	

=== Television series ===
Year	Title	Role	Notes	Ref.
2002	No Problem! (考试家族)	Jessica		
2003	Chemistry	Rachel		
2003	A Toast of Love	Angela Sun Yujia		
2004	My Mighty-in-Laws	Li Yingying		
2004	Achar! II	Stephanie		
2005	You Are the One	Yukiko Hao Meide		
2005	Beyond The aXis of Truth II	Fang Xiuxiu		
2005	A Promise for Tomorrow	Fang Fang		
2005	High on Life	Herself		
2006	Love at 0 °C	Sun Yixin		
2007	Honour and Passion	Bao Wenwei		
2007	Metamorphosis	An Xiaoqian		
2008	By My Side	Zhang Yuhang		
2009	The Dream Catchers	Lin Jiaqi		
2009	My School Daze	Isabel Teo		
2010	Happy Family	Yang Xiaodong		
2010	With You	Ye Siqi		
2010	Unriddle	Hu Xiaoman		
2011	A Tale of Two Cities	Zhang Yale		
2011	The In-Laws	Wang Jiazhen		
2011	Code of Honour	Ou Kelu		
2011	On the Fringe 2011	Lin Shasha		
2012	Unriddle 2	Hu Xiaoman		
2012	Joys of Life	Han Yongyong		
2012	Poetic Justice	Liu Yanzhi		
2013	C.L.I.F. 2	Huang Zhijie		
2013	The Dream Makers	Fang Tonglin		
2013	Sudden	Cheng Chuning		
2014	C.L.I.F. 3	Huang Zhijie		
2014	Against The Tide	Qiu Xueqing		
2015	Life Is Beautiful	Shen Chuyi		
2015	The Journey: Our Homeland	Yang Meixue		
2015	The Dream Makers II	Fang Tonglin		
2015	The World of Georgette Chen	Georgette Chen	Three-part docudrama	
2016	If Only I Could	Chen Zhenhao		
2016	C.L.I.F. 4	Huang Zhijie		
2017	Have A Little Faith	Liang Sijie		
2019	Hello From The Other Side (阴错阳差)	Ma Ruyin		
2019	Old Is Gold (老友万岁)	Han Xinxin		
2020	Mister Flower (花花公子)	Chen Huiling		
2021	The Heartland Hero	Qiu Jingwen		
2023	Oppa, Saranghae!	Ouyang Qiqi		

=== Variety show ===
Year	Title	Role	Network	Notes	Ref.
2003	Gotcha I	Host	Mediacorp Channel 5		
2020	Dare To Try (瑞恩的花花世界)	Host	MeWatch		

== Discography ==
Rui En discography
- Studio albums: 2
- Compilation albums: 2
- Singles: 3
- Music videos: 7
- Theme Songs: 3

=== Solo albums ===
- Rui Σn vol. 01 芮恩Rui Σn同名專輯 (December 2002)
- United Nations 共和國 (October 2008)

=== Compilations ===
- Morning Express VI 阳光系列6 (2003)

This compilation album consists of Rui En's The Way To Be Happy 快乐方式 (Track 3) and Test 考验 (Track 9). The songs were released under Rui En's birth name – 卢瑞恩 (Lú Ruì'ēn).

- Celebrating 25 Years of Chinese Drama Collector's Edition 戏剧情牵25 (2007)

This album is a Collector's Edition composed of memorable theme songs spanning across the Singapore Chinese Drama's Twenty-Five years' History. Tracks from Rui En include a remix version of "The Way To Be Happy 快乐方式" and "Unfreeze 解冻". The songs were released under Rui En's stage name – 芮恩 (Ruì'ēn).

=== Singles ===
- "Listen to Your Heart"

This is the theme song for The Community Chest of Singapore and there are English and Mandarin versions to this song. The songs were released in the form of a Single.

- "Reach Out for the Skies (2005)"

This is the theme song for National Day Parade, 2005 and there are English and Mandarin versions to this song. Music videos were produced for both versions.

- "Listen to Your Heart – Remix (2009)"

A remix version of the theme song for The Community Chest of Singapore, the Mandarin track was first performed on televised charity show, TrueHearts Show 2009. The EP released in November 2009 consisted of the original tracks and the remixes in both English and Mandarin. This graphic artwork for this single was designed by Rui En's fan club, RBKD, on behalf of The Community Chest of Singapore.

- "Sky's the Limit"

A single by Taufik Batisah featuring Rui En.

- "Numb" 麻木 (2013)

A single by Rui En.

=== Drama theme songs ===
- Beautiful Connection – "The Way To Be Happy 快乐方式 "(2002)

This song was nominated as Best Drama Theme Song in Star Awards 2002 and was first released in Morning Express VI. A remix version was released in Celebrating 25 Years of Chinese Drama Collector's Edition.

- No Problem! – "Test 考验" (2003)

This is an insert song released in Morning Express VI.

- Love at 0 °C – "Unfreeze 解冻" (2006)

This was Rui En's first set of self-penned lyrics published and also her first and only theme song for the drama she is starring in. This song is released in Celebrating 25 Years of Chinese Drama Collecter's Edition.

- By My Side – "Slow Dance 慢舞" (2008)

This is an insert song found in Rui En's United Nations.

=== Singles ===
Year	Title	Album	Label
2005	"Reach Out for the Skies" (with Taufik Batisah)	Non-album single	Hype Records
2005	"勇敢向前飞"	Non-album single	Hype Records

== Awards and nominations ==
Year	Organisation	Category	Nominated work	Result	Ref.
2002	Star Awards	Best Theme Song	Beautiful Connection	Nominated	
2004	Star Awards	Best Newcomer	—N/a	Nominated	
2005	Star Awards	Top 10 Most Popular Female Artistes	—N/a	Won	
2006	Star Awards	Top 10 Most Popular Female Artistes	—N/a	Won	
2007	Star Awards	Top 10 Most Popular Female Artistes	—N/a	Won	
2009	Star Awards	Top 10 Most Popular Female Artistes	—N/a	Won	
2010	Star Awards	Top 10 Most Popular Female Artistes	—N/a	Won	
2010	Star Awards	Favourite Female Character	My School Daze (as Zhang Luo Yun)	Nominated	
2010	Star Awards	Favourite Female Character	The Dream Catchers (as Lin Jiaqi)	Nominated	
2011	Star Awards	Best Actress	With You (as Ye Siqi)	Won	
2011	Star Awards	Top 10 Most Popular Female Artistes	—N/a	Won	
2011	Star Awards	Favourite Female Character	Happy Family (as Yang Xiaodong)	Won	
2011	Star Awards	Favourite Onscreen Couple (with Chen Hanwei)	With You (as Ye Siqi)	Nominated	
2011	Star Awards	Systema Most Charming Smile Award	—N/a	Nominated	
2012	Asian Television Awards	Best Actress in a Leading Role	Unriddle 2 (as Hu Xiaoman)	Won	
2012	Star Awards	Best Actress	A Tale of Two Cities (as Zhang Yale)	Nominated	
2012	Star Awards	Top 10 Most Popular Female Artistes	—N/a	Won	
2012	Star Awards	Favourite Female Character	A Tale of Two Cities (as Zhang Yale)	Won	
2012	Star Awards	Favourite Onscreen Couple (with Elvin Ng)	Code of Honour (as Ou Kelu)	Won	
2012	Star Awards	Favourite Onscreen Couple (with Pierre Png)	The In-Laws (as Wang Jiazhen)	Nominated	
2013	Star Awards	Top 10 Most Popular Female Artistes	—N/a	Won	
2013	Star Awards	Favourite Female Character	Poetic Justice (as Liu Yanzhi)	Won	
2013	Star Awards	Favourite Onscreen Couple (with Elvin Ng)	Unriddle 2 (as Hu Xiaoman)	Won	
2013	Star Awards	Favourite Onscreen Couple (with Alien Huang)	Joys of Life (as Han Yongyong)	Nominated	
2013	Star Awards	Best Actress	Unriddle 2 (as Hu Xiaoman)	Won	
2013	Star Awards	iWeekly Most Stylish Award	—N/a	Won	
2014	Asian Television Awards	Best Actress in a Leading Role	Sudden (as Ching Cho Ning)	Nominated	
2014	Star Awards	Top 10 Most Popular Female Artistes	—N/a	Won	
2014	Star Awards	Most Popular Regional Artiste (Indonesia)	—N/a	Won	
2014	Star Awards	Most Popular Regional Artiste (Malaysia)	—N/a	Won	
2014	Star Awards	Most Popular Regional Artiste (Cambodia)	—N/a	Nominated	
2014	Star Awards	Most Popular Regional Artiste (China)	—N/a	Nominated	
2014	Star Awards	Favourite Female Character	The Dream Makers (as Fang Tonglin)	Nominated	
2014	Star Awards	Favourite Onscreen Couple	The Dream Makers (as Fang Tonglin)	Nominated (Note: Shared with Qi Yu Wu)	
2014	Star Awards	Favourite Onscreen Couple with Romeo Tan	Sudden (as Ching Cho Ning)	Nominated	
2014	Star Awards	Favourite Onscreen Couple with Li Nanxing	C.L.I.F. 2 (as Ng Yze Keat)	Nominated	
2014	Star Awards	Best Actress	The Dream Makers (as Fang Tonglin)	Nominated	
2015	Star Awards	Top 10 Most Popular Female Artistes	—N/a	Won	
2015	Star Awards	Favourite Female Character	Against The Tide (as Qiu Xueqing)	Nominated	
2015	Star Awards	Most Popular Regional Artiste (Indonesia)	—N/a	Nominated	
2015	Star Awards	Most Popular Regional Artiste (Malaysia)	—N/a	Nominated	
2015	Star Awards	Most Popular Regional Artiste (Cambodia)	—N/a	Nominated	
2015	Star Awards	Most Popular Regional Artiste (China)	—N/a	Nominated	
2015	Star Awards	Favourite Onscreen Couple (with Li Nanxing)	C.L.I.F. 3 (as Ng Yze Keat)	Nominated	
2015	Star Awards	Best Actress	Against The Tide (as Qiu Xueqing)	Nominated	
2016	Star Awards	All-Time Favourite Artiste	—N/a	Won	
2016	Star Awards	Favourite Female Character	The Dream Makers II (as Fang Tonglin)	Nominated	
2016	Star Awards	Favourite Onscreen Couple (with Qi Yu Wu)	The Dream Makers II (as Fang Tonglin)	Nominated	
2016	Star Awards	Favourite Onscreen Couple (with Shaun Chen)	The Journey: Our Homeland (as Yang Meixue)	Nominated	
2016	Star Awards	Toggle Most Beloved BFF Award (with Dennis Chew)	—N/a	Won	
2016	Star Awards	Best Actress	The Dream Makers II (as Fang Tonglin)	Nominated	
2017	Star Awards	Best Actress	If Only I Could (as Chen Zhenhao)	Nominated	
2021	Star Awards	Best Actress	Hello From The Other Side (as Ma Ruyin)	Nominated	
2022	Star Awards	Best Supporting Actress	The Heartland Hero (as Qiu Jingwen)	Nominated	
2022	Star Awards	Favourite Female Show Stealer	Mister Flower (as Chen Huiling)	Nominated	
2022	Star Awards	Favourite CP (with Elvin Ng)	Mister Flower (as Chen Huiling)	Nominated	
2024	Star Awards	Best Actress	Oppa, Saranghae! (as Ouyang Qiqi)	Nominated	
2024	Star Awards	Favourite CP (with Kim Jae Hoon)	Oppa, Saranghae! (as Ouyang Qiqi)	Nominated	

== Honours ==
In 2007, Rui En was presented with the "Nanyang Outstanding Young People Award" by her alma mater Nanyang Technological University.
