= Tseng Chang =

Hong Kong actor (1930–2021)

- 張錚
- Born: 18 May 1930; Beijing, China
- Died: 25 January 2021 (aged 90); Richmond, British Columbia, Canada
- Citizenship: British subject Canada (after 1997)
- Education: Shanghai Jiao Tong University
- Occupation: Actor
- Years active: 1953–2017

Chinese name
- Traditional Chinese: 張錚
- Simplified Chinese: 张铮
Transcriptions
Standard Mandarin
- Hanyu Pinyin: Zhāng Zhēng

Chang Ku-foo
- Traditional Chinese: 張喬夫
- Simplified Chinese: 张乔夫
Transcriptions
Standard Mandarin
- Hanyu Pinyin: Zhāng Qiáofū

Tseng Chang (Chinese: 張錚; born Chang Ku-foo (Chinese: 張喬夫); 18 May 1930 – 25 January 2021) was a Hong Kong actor and film director. He had an extensive career in Hong Kong cinema beginning in the 1950s until the mid-'90s, when he moved to Canada.

== Early life ==
Tseng Chang (Chinese: 張錚) was born Chang Ku-foo (Chinese: 張喬夫) in Beijing, China in 1930, to a family originally from the city of Tongzhou (now a district of Beijing proper). He was raised mainly in Shanghai, and studied mechanical engineering Shanghai Jiao Tong University to study mechanical engineering, but left school to take care of his ailing father. After a stint working for an airline, he moved to Hong Kong in 1948.

== Career ==
In 1951, Chang joined the Great Wall Movie Enterprises studio as an actor. He initially played supporting roles, and later leading parts, in Mandarin-language films.

In 1996, Chang moved to British Columbia, and began working in the Vancouver film industry. He became a staple in "Hollywood North" productions. He was a two-time Leo Award winner, out of four nominations.

Chang was also President of the Vancouver Film and Television Artists Society.

== Death ==
Chang died at Richmond Hospital, Richmond, British Columbia, Canada, aged 90.

== Partial filmography ==
- Agent Cody Banks
- 8 Minutes Ahead
- Final Recipe
- Arrow
- Gunlow
- 2012
- The Unseen
- 8 Minutes Ahead
- Romaine par moins 30
- Christmas Cottage
- Sobrenatural
- Dim Sum Funeral
- Whistler
- They Wait
- Novio por una noche
- Sai Gon nhat thuc
- Dragon Boys
- Intelligence
- Everything's Gone Green
- The Game of Strangers
- Regenesis
- Reefer Madness: The Musical Movie
- Adolescent's Diaries
- The Murdoch Mysteries
- Zi yu zi le
- Kingdom Hospital
- Betraying Reason
- Long Life, Happiness & Prosperity
- Da Vinci's Inquest
- The Miracle of the Cards
- L'or
- Walking Shadow
- Lunch with Charles
- Turn It Up
- Dr. Jekyll and Mr. Hyde
- 7 Days
- These Arms of Mine
- Night Man
- Breaker High
- Ninja Turtles: The Next Mutation
- Nu ren si shi
- Xiang xi shi Wang
- Yu ya gong wu
- Qi an shi lu bai se tong dao
- Bullet to the Heat
- As Tears Go By
- Ba shi qi yu jie liang yuan
- Qu Yuan
- Yi bang rou
- Hsi nou ai le
- Wo di yi jia
- Shuang nu qing qe
- Zhen zhu feng yun
- Ying chun hua
- Xi Shi
- Yan yu
- Fen hong se de meng
- Jin ying
- Na na nu nu
- Wu hu hiang
- Xue di qing chou
- Lei yu
- Wang lao wu zhi lian
- Ji ling gui yu xiao lai mao
- Mi ren de jia qi
- Xiao mi qu shi
- Lan hua hua
- You nu huai chun
- Xiang xiang pen xiao jie
- Ming Feng
- Hong deng long
- Lian feng he ming
- Mei gui yan
- Nu zi gong yu
- Shao nu de fan nao
- Bu yao li kai wo
- Du hui jiao xiang qu
- Jue dai jia ren
- Cun cao xin
- Nie hai hua
- Hua hua shi jie
