= List of war films and TV specials set between 3050 BC and AD 476 =

War depictions in film and television include documentaries, TV mini-series, and drama serials depicting aspects of historical wars, the films included here are films set in the Ancient world starting with Ancient Egypt and lasting until the fall of the Western Roman Empire in about AD 476.

Note: All wars are BC unless other wise noted.

== War of Ancient Egypt (3050 BC –332 BC) ==
- The Loves of Pharaoh (1922)
- Sudan (1945)
- The Egyptian (1954)
- Land of the Pharaohs (1955)
- The Pharaohs' Woman (1960)
- Queen of the Nile (1961)
- Pharaoh (1966)
- Nefertiti, figlia del sole (1994)
- The Scorpion King (2002)
- Exodus: Gods and Kings (2014) - battle of Kadesh
- Tut (2015)

== War of Ancient Israel (1600–400 BC) ==
- Esther (1916)
- The Queen of Sheba (1921)
- Salome (1923)
- The Ten Commandments (1923)
- Judith and Holofernes (1929)
- David and Bathsheba (1951)
- The Queen of Sheba (1952)
- Slaves of Babylon (1953)
- The Ten Commandments (1956)
- Solomon and Sheba (1959)
- Judith and Holofernes (1959)
- Esther and the King (1960)
- Moses the Lawgiver (1974)
- The Story of David (1976)
- King David (1985)
- Moses (1995)
- Solomon & Sheba (1995)
- One Night with the King (2006)
- The Ten Commandments (2007)
- The Book of Esther (2013)
- Exodus: Gods and Kings (2014)

== Trojan War (1193–1183 BC) ==
- The Fall of Troy (1911)
- Helena (1924)
- The Private Life of Helen of Troy (1927)
- Helen of Troy (1956)
- The Trojan Horse (1961)
- L'ira di Achille (1962)
- The Trojan Women (1971)
- Iphigenia (1977)
- Helen of Troy (2003)
- Troy (2004)
- Troy: Fall of a City (2018)，TV series
- Odyssey (2026)

== Wars of Ancient China (771 BC–280 AD) ==
=== Spring and Autumn period (771-476 BC) ===
- The Great Revival (2007)
- Confucius (2010)

=== Warring States period (476–221 BC) ===
- Qu Yuan (1977)
- The Emperor's Shadow (1996)
- The Emperor and the Assassin (1999)
- Hero (2002)
- A Battle of Wits (2006)
- Wheat (2009)
- Sacrifice (2010)
- Little Big Soldier (2010)
- The Warring States (2011)

=== Chu–Han Contention (206–202 BC) ===
- The Great Conqueror's Concubine (1994)
- White Vengeance (2011)
- The Last Supper (2012)
- Legend of Chu and Han (2012)

=== Han–Xiongnu War (133 BC–89 AD) ===
- Mulan (1998), animated film
- Mulan II (2004), animated film
- Mulan (2009)
- Mulan (2020), live-action remake of 1998 animated film

=== Wars of the Three Kingdoms (220–280 AD) ===
- Diao Chan (1938)
- Diao Chan (1958)
- Red Cliff (2008)
- Three Kingdoms: Resurrection of the Dragon (2008)
- Three Kingdoms (2010)
- The Lost Bladesman (2011)
- The Assassins (2012)

== Scythian campaign of Cyrus The Great (530 BC) ==
- Tomiris (2019)

== Greco-Persian Wars (499–450 BC) ==
- La battaglia di Maratona (1959)
- The 300 Spartans (1962)
- 300 (2006) Battle of Thermopylae, Battle of Plataea
- Last Stand of the 300 (2007) TV documentary/reenactment which premièred on The History Channel
- 300: Rise of an Empire (2014) Battle of Plataea, Battle of Marathon, Battle of Artemisium, Battle of Salamis

== Wars of Alexander the Great (338–325 BC) ==
- Sikandar (1941)
- Alexander the Great (1956)
- Goliath e la schiava ribelle (1963)
- Alexander (2004), depictions of the Battles of Gaugamela and Hydaspes

== Wars of the Diadochi (322–275 BC) ==
- Il Colosso di Rodi (1961)

== Asoka the Great's conquests (304–232 BC) ==
- Asoka (2001)
- Chakravartin Ashoka Samrat

== Wars of the Roman Kingdom/Republic/Empire ==
- The First King: Birth of an Empire (2019)
- Brennus, Enemy of Rome (1963), the first Gallic invasion of Italy
- Rome (TV series) (2005/2007)
- Augustine: The Decline of the Roman Empire (2010) TV miniseries about St Augustine set during the Vandal invasion
- Dragon Blade (2015)

=== Punic Wars (264–146 BC) ===
- Cabiria (1914)
- Scipio Africanus: The Defeat of Hannibal (1937)
- Annibale (1960), the Second Punic War
- Carthage in Flames (1960), the Third Punic War
- Siege of Syracuse (1960)
- Hannibal (2006), TV depiction of the Second Punic War

=== Servile Wars (135–75 BC) ===
- Sins of Rome (1953)
- Spartacus (1960), the Third Servile War
- The Slave (1962)
- Spartacus and the Ten Gladiators (1964)
- Spartacus (2004)
- Spartacus (2010)

=== Roman civil wars during the Late Republic (133–31 BC) ===
- Cleopatra (1917)
- Cleopatra (1934)
- Caesar and Cleopatra (1945)
- Julius Caesar (1950)
- Julius Caesar (1953)
- Serpent of the Nile (1953)
- Legions of the Nile (1959)
- Cleopatra (1963)
- Julius Caesar (1970)
- Antony and Cleopatra (1972)
- Antony and Cleopatra (1974)
- Antony and Cleopatra (1981)
- Cleopatra (1999)
- Rome (2005)

=== Roman campaigns in Germania (12 BC - AD 16) (12 BC – 16 AD) ===
- Barbarians (2020) - TV series

=== Jewish–Roman wars (63 BC – 135 AD) ===
- Ben-Hur (1925)
- Salome (1953)
- Ben Hur (1959)
- King of Kings (1961)
- Masada (1981)
- Ben Hur (2016)
- Risen (2016)

=== Gallic Wars (58–50 BC) ===
- Slave of Rome (1961)
- Caesar the Conqueror (1962)
- Giants of Rome (1964)
- Asterix animated films based on the comic book character and the Gallic Wars
- Druids (a.k.a. Vercingétorix) (2001)

=== War of Roman Britain (43–410) ===
- Boudica (2003), fictionalized story of Boudicca, Queen of the Iceni of Britain and the revolt against Roman occupation.
- Centurion (2010), Roman ninth Legion in 2nd century Britain
- The Eagle (2011), Roman centurion in 2nd century Britain
- Britannia (2018)
- Boudica (2023)

=== Dacian Wars (86–106) ===
- Dacii (1967), the Domitian's Dacian War
- The Column (1968), the Trajan's Dacian Wars

=== Marcomannic Wars (167–180) ===
- The Fall of the Roman Empire (1964), the Marcomannic Wars
- Gladiator (2000), the Marcomannic Wars

=== Roman civil wars during the Late Empire (306–398) ===
- Constantine and the Cross (1961), chronicle of emperor Constantine's life including the famous Battle of the Milvian Bridge
- The Fall of Rome (1963)
- Decline of an Empire (2014)

=== War with the Huns (395–453) ===
- Attila (1954), European campaign of Attila the Hun
- Sign of the Pagan (1954)
- Revenge of the Barbarians (1960), about the Sack of Rome in 410 AD
- Revenge of the Gladiators (1964)
- Attila flagello di Dio (1982)
- Attila (2001), TV miniseries of the European campaign of Attila the Hun

=== Fall of the Western Roman Empire (455–476) ===
- The Last Legion (2007)

== See also ==
List of war films and TV specials
