= United Nations (Rui En album) =

Studio album by Rui En
- Released: October 2008
- Genre: C-Pop, R&B, Mando-pop
- Length: 43 minutes
- Language: Mandarin, Taiwanese
- Label: Hype Records
- Producer: Ken Lim

Rui En chronology
Rui Σn vol. 01 芮恩Rui Σn同名專輯 (2002)	United Nations (2008)

United Nations (simplified Chinese: 共和国; traditional Chinese: 共和國; pinyin: gònghéguó) is Rui En's second studio album, released in October 2008. The album was produced by Hype Records and exclusively distributed at CD-Rama music stores, released only for the Singapore local market. It has been released on Apple iTunes. Rui En resumed the use of her Chinese name, 瑞恩 (Ruì'ēn) in this album.

The album followed Rui En's six-year hiatus from the music industry and featured lyrics penned exclusively by the artist, written in the form of a diary documenting her thoughts and opinions.

== Track listing ==
All lyrics are written by Rui En; all music is composed by Ken Lim, except "Inside Out (穿反)" composed by Taz

No.	Title	Length
1.	"United Nations" (共和國 gònghéguó)	4:17
2.	"Frog" (青蛙 qīngwā)	3:43
3.	"Slow Dance" (慢舞 màn wǔ)	4:13
4.	"Let Go" (放手 fàngshǒu)	3:37
5.	"Inside Out" (穿反 chuānfǎn)	4:16
6.	"Spin" (飛旋 fēixuán)	4:02
7.	"Empty Vase" (空瓶 kōngpíng)	3:31
8.	"Travel Notes" (遊記 yóujì)	3:40
9.	"Slow Dance (Slow Edit)" (慢舞 màn wǔ)	4:13
10.	"Frog (Unplugged)" (青蛙 qīngwā)	3:36
11.	"United Nations (Slow Edit)" (共和國 gònghéguó)	4:04

== Track contents ==
1. "United Nations" 共和國 (gònghéguó)

The title is a spin-off from the term 'United States' – 'states' being moods and emotional states. In this song, Rui En introduces her singer to her different inner states of thinking, often contradicting and ever-changing.

A music video was produced for this song. This music video is the sequel to the music video of "Frog", showing the life of an artiste behind the scene. The music video adopts a mock reality TV approach by capturing the different happenings in one single shot throughout, highlighting the contrast of on-screen limelight and off-screen loneliness.

2. "Frog" 青蛙 (qīngwā)

This song likens city dwellers to frogs, pursuing beyond one's reach without realising what they truly want in life. Rui En encourages her listeners not to follow trends blindly or to feel discouraged when falling behind.

A music video was produced for this song.

3. "Slow Dance" 慢舞 (màn wǔ)

Rui En links a dying love to a slow dance in this song, claiming how one becomes the limelight with the right partner and how love, like dance, is about seeking perfection. When either or is imperfect, the love is like the last dance, and it has to end when the dance is over.

This track is the insert song of By My Side.

4. "Let Go" 放手 (fàngshǒu)

A song about letting go finally, of a betrayed love.

5. "Inside Out" 穿反 (chuānfǎn)

Rui En uses the analogy of wearing a shirt inside out despite one's best efforts to discourage her listeners from conforming to the masses. An emotional song that encourages individuals to remove their 'mask' and to appreciate their true self.

6. "Spin" 飛旋 (fēixuán)

A motivational song written after reading about a news article of how a US Navy soldier struggled with life after losing his limbs in war.

7. "Empty Vase" 空瓶 (kōngpíng)

A dig at male chauvinists by referring them as empty vases.

8. "Travel Notes 遊記 (yóujì)

Describes how there's only a fine line between letting go and choosing to escape from reality.
