= List of Against the Tide episodes =

MediaCorp Channel 8's television series Against the Tide is a psychological drama series produced by MediaCorp Singapore in 2014. The series, which stars Christopher Lee and Rui En as the main characters, will explore the mind and psyche of the subject, with the struggles and darkness of humanity.

As of 24 October 2014, all 23 episodes of Against the Tide have been aired on MediaCorp Channel 8.

== Episodes ==
No.	Title	Original release date
1	"1" "Imprisoned Soul (被禁锢的灵魂)"	24 September 2014; PG Some Violence
2	"2" "You Can't Succumb To Fear (绝不能恐惧)"	25 September 2014; PG Some Violence
3	"3" "The Last Look In Her Eyes (她最后的眼神)"	26 September 2014; PG Some Violence
4	"4" "Does Justice Exist? (正义是否存在)"	29 September 2014; PG Some Violence
5	"5" "No Light To Call My Own (没有我的灯光)"	30 September 2014; PG Some Violence
6	"6" "Justice In The Shadows (暗影中的正义)"	1 October 2014; PG Some Disturbing Scenes
7	"7" "The Most Fearsome Enemy (最可怕的敌人)"	2 October 2014; PG Some Violence
8	"8" "The People's Verdict (全民判决)"	3 October 2014; PG Some Sexual References
9	"9" "Hating the Colour Grey (讨厌灰色)"	6 October 2014; PG Some Sexual References
10	"10" "Control-Z (Control-Z)"	7 October 2014; PG Some Sexual References
11	"11" "The Truth Not To Be Told (不能说的真相)"	8 October 2014; PG Some Violence
12	"12" "The One-way Train (单向列车)"	9 October 2014; PG Some Violence
13	"13" "Humanity vs Bestiality (人性兽性)"	10 October 2014; PG Some Violence
14	"14" "Evil from the Abyss (深洲里的恶魔)"	13 October 2014; PG Some Violence
15	"15" "Crimson Seduction (菲红色迷惑)"	14 October 2014; PG Some Violence
16	"16" "Fight for Hope (为希望而战)"	15 October 2014; PG Some Violence
17	"17" "Into the Shadows (走入影子中)"	16 October 2014; PG Some Violence
18	"18" "Fanatical Obsession (狂热执念)"	17 October 2014; PG Some Violence
19	"19" "Brush with Darkness (触摸黑暗之际)"	20 October 2014; PG Some Violence
20	"20" "TisiPhone (TisiPhone)"	21 October 2014; PG Some Violence
21	"21" "Storm of Silence (沉默的雷暴)"	22 October 2014; PG Some Violence
22	"22" "The Dim Glow of the Stars (那一点星光)"	23 October 2014; PG Some Violence
23	"23 (Finale)" "The Burning Snow (燃烧的雪)"	24 October 2014; PG Some Violence

== See also ==
- List of MediaCorp Channel 8 Chinese Drama Series (2010s)
- Against the Tide
