= Rui En vol. 01 =

Rui Σn Vol. 01

Studio album by Rui En
- Released: November 2002
- Genre: C-Pop, R&B, Mando-pop
- Language: Mandarin, Taiwanese
- Label: Alfa Music; Hype Records; BMG Music Taiwan Inc.
- Producer: Sunny Lin, Ken Lim

Rui En chronology
Rui Σn Vol. 01 (2002)	United Nations 共和國 (2008)

Rui Σn Vol. 01 (simplified Chinese: 芮恩Rui Σn同名专辑; traditional Chinese: 芮恩Rui Σn同名專輯; pinyin: Ruì'ēn tóng míng zhuān jí) is Rui En's debut album, which was released in December 2002. The album was jointly produced by Alfa Music and Hype Records, and distributed regionally by BMG Music Taiwan Inc.. Rui En assumed the Chinese name of 芮恩 (Ruì'ēn) when releasing this album, and was introduced as The Girl Who Fears Being Ordinary, seriously recommended by Jay Chou.

== Track listing ==
No.	Title	Lyrics	Music	Length
1.	"White Feather" (白色羽毛 báisè yǔmáo)	Vincent Fang	Jay Chou	3:52
2.	"Alibi" (不在場證明 bú zàichǎng zhèngmíng)	Shih-Chang Hsu 許世昌	Michael Lin 林邁可	3:33
3.	"Why Should You Bother" (你管我 nǐ guǎn wǒ)	Vincent Fang	Michael Lin	2:46
4.	"Love's Side Effect" (愛情副作用 àiqíng fùzuòyòng)	Li-Tung 李曈	Jim Lim 林毅心	4:31
5.	"Hate It" (討厭 tǎo yàn)	Luo Jianming 羅健明	Jim Lim	4:18
6.	"Who Is That" (是誰 shì shuí)	Vincent Fang	Michael Lin	4:23
7.	"Friends At Daybreak" (天亮當朋友 tiānliàng dāng péngyou)	Vincent Fang	Michael Lin	4:29
8.	"Tired & Annoyed" (累了煩了 lèile fán le)	Li-Tung	Jim Lim	4:00
9.	"Can't Shake It Off" (甩不掉 shuǎi bú diào)	Li-Tung	Ken Lim	3:58
10.	"The Unconventional Niceness" (另類對你好 lìnglèi duì nǐhǎo)	Lee Rong Xin 李榮新	Jim Lim	4:46

== Track contents ==
1. "White Feather" 白色羽毛 (báisè yǔmáo)

An R&B track written by well-known Chinese composer-lyricist pairing - Jay Chou and Vincent Fang. The song likens love to a soft and white feather drifting in the air, unpredictable and beyond one's grasp or control.

A music video was produced for this track.

2. "Alibi" 不在場證明 (bú zàichǎng zhèngmíng)

A song about mistrust in a relationship and how love cannot be divided and shared. The wholesomeness of the other party's love is what one pursues and in the face of betrayal, splitting way is the only way out.

3. "Why Should You Bother" 你管我 (nǐ guǎn wǒ)

An upbeat tune on the ambiguous relationship between the two protagonists during courtship, revealing some cheekiness in their interaction.

Rap: Jason (王威登)

4. "Love's Side Effects" 愛情副作用 (àiqíng fùzuòyòng)

The lyrics describes the side effects of a relationship and how it should be ended if one finds herself changing and losing her own self. The lyrics suggest that when one requires his loved one to change for him, then the one he loves is not the real her, and that there is no right or wrong to part in order to not lose one's self.

5. "Hate It" 討厭 (tǎo yàn)

A song describing how one loses her true self because of the relationship in order to accommodate to the other party. And how the protagonist proposes giving up this love-hate relationship that is making her feel so pretentious.

A music video was produced for this track.
This song was covered by A-Lin in the second season of the Chinese edition of the Mask Singer in 2017.

6. "Who Is That" 是誰 (shì shuí)

This soothing track is tailor-made for the Rui En by well-known composer-producer Michael Lin and lyricist Vincent Fang. Rui En gives the song a personal touch with her own interpretation of doubt and frustration in relationships when a third party comes along.

A music video was produced for this track.

7. "Friends At Daybreak" 天亮當朋友 (tiānliàng dāng péngyou)

A soulful duet by Rui En and Forte describing the couple's reluctance to part when love has died down. The lyrics likened the situation to one's crossroads, difficult as it may be, the wisest choice is to part amicably and remain as friends come the next day, hence the title.

8. "Tired & Annoyed" 累了煩了 (lèile fán le)

Rui En sings the frustration of feeling tired about a dying relationship and how parting ways is the only solution to prevent further annoyance.

9. "Can't Shake It Off" 甩不掉 (shuǎi bú diào)

A rock music style song introducing the listener to a different and usual Rui En.

10. "The Unconventional Niceness" 另類對你好 (lìnglèi duì nǐhǎo)

The song is a detail representation of Rui En's unconventional take on love, on her persistence and her difference from other girls. Rui En's unique vocals makes the song more heartfelt and resonates with the listeners.
