= My Mighty-in-Laws =

- 野蛮亲家
- Starring: Zoe Tay; Rui En; Tay Ping Hui; Pan Lingling; Lin Meijiao; Huang Wenyong
- Country of origin: Singapore
- Original language: Mandarin
- No. of episodes: 20

Production
- Running time: 60 minutes (approx.)

Original release
- Network: Mediacorp Channel 8
- Release: 17 November – 14 December 2004

Related
- The Champion; Devil's Blues

My Mighty-in-Laws (Chinese: 野蛮亲家) is a Singaporean Chinese drama which was telecasted on Singapore's free-to-air channel, MediaCorp Channel 8. This drama serial consists of 20 episodes. It made its debut on 17 November 2004 and ended its run on 14 December 2004. It was repeated at 2am on Mondays, succeeding A Song to Remember.

== Plot ==
Yao Meimei (Zoe Tay) is a well-known and well-respected figure in both the legal business world as well as the underworld, and has come far from her days of setting up a bootlegged CD empire to earn a living. She and her elder sister Yao Jiaojiao (Lin Mei Meijiao) has depended on each other for support since they were little.

However, the two sisters are vastly different in character – Jiaojiao is gentle and ladylike, while Meimei is brash and quick tempered. Three years ago, Jiaojiao was diagnosed with cancer and hospitalised. Jiaojiao was worried that she would not be able to witness Meimei's marriage, and would be unable to face their parents' spirits when she joins them in death. Thus, to put her sister's mind at ease, Meimei married Li Dacheng (Rayson Tan), her primary schoolmate who has admired her for a long time and has been a widower for many years.

Surprisingly, not long after Meimei's wedding, Jiaojiao's health improves and she gradually recovers. On the other hand, Dacheng, who is a tour guide, has a mishap while taking a tour group in China. He gets swept away in a river while saving a child who has fallen into the water, and disappears. Meimei is forced to take care of Dacheng's mother, Jin Yayin (Li Yinzhu), as well as his daughter Li Yingying (Rui En) who is studying in the United States. Yayin blames Meimei for Dacheng's disappearance, saying that she has been cursed to remain lonely all her life. Meimei and Yayin's relationship thus sours.

Three years after Dacheng's disappearance, Yingying graduates and returns from overseas. However, she is still unable to get along with Yayin. It turns out that the strange-tempered Yayin had quarreled with Yingying's mother more than ten years ago, causing Yingying's mother to choke to death on a fish bone. Yingying was six years old then, and had witnessed the scene. She has since always believed that Yayin had caused her mother's death.

A carefree, independent and rather overtly confident person, Yingying resists authority, and believes in doing things for herself. She hates being restricted by Meimei, yet often has to be rescued by Meimei when she gets into trouble due to her penchant for heroic deeds. For example, when she just landed in Singapore and is on the way back from the airport, Yingying sees the timid introvert Fang Zhengde (Vincent Ng) harassed by a road-bully. She steps up and retaliates on his behalf. The matter snowballs and she gets to know a street thug named Ding Mu (Zhang Yaodong).

Jiaojiao hatches a plot for Meimei to try to bring Zhengde and Yingying together. Zhengde comes from a decent family, and is the heir to the local Chinese medicinal company "HuiChunDan". He does not have the courage to approach her, and so Jiaojiao devises many plans to help him date Yingying.

Yingying is pleased when Zhengde makes the first move to see her. However, when she finds out that it has been planned and arranged by Meimei and Jiaojiao, Yingying feels that her privacy has been invaded. Since she hates living with Yayin and Meimei, she decides to go along with the plan and forces Zhengde to marry her as soon as possible! Although Zhengde is pleasantly surprised, he has to seek approval from his father, the boss of "HuiChunDan", Fang Chunqiu (Huang Wenyong).

Fang Chunqiu is an old fashioned man with traditional values. His wife died more than ten years ago, but he has never remarried. Oblivious to the adoration from his wife's younger sister, Vanessa (Pan Lingling), he lets Vanessa help him with the managing and upgrading of "HuiChunDan". He also wishes to see his son settle down as soon as possible, and carry on the family name. Thus, when Zhengde brings up the topic of marriage, he is ecstatic. However, being a traditional man with set ideas on compatibility issues, he insists on meeting the in-laws first.

In order to help Yingying pass the test of scrutiny, Meimei and Jiaojiao create a false front of a perfectly normal happy family. Unfortunately, Vanessa and Meimei have had run-ins in the past, and Vanessa reveals Meimei's true identity. Chunqiu disapproves of the marriage and even locks Zhengde up at home to prevent him from seeing Yingying. Through a lot of effort including a combination of various methods, Chunqiu finally gives his approval.

The independent Yingying has many falling outs with Chunqiu and Vanessa after moving in with her in-laws. To everyone's surprise, Jiaojiao and Chunqiu grow closer. The jealousy bug gnaws at Vanessa who feels that she is losing her place in the family. When checking the company accounts, Jiaojiao discovers that Vanessa has been using company funds for her personal use. Vanessa is furious, and makes up her mind to take revenge on Chunqiu, Meimei, Jiaojiao and Yingying.

Simon (Tay Ping Hui) is an undercover cop who is righteous, optimistic, eloquent and good at cheering up the people around him. Just when Meimei and Simon start to fall in love with each other, Dacheng reappears! Dacheng has lost part of his memory, and only remembers Meimei as his one and only love. Meimei is thrown into a complicated love triangle.

Vanessa is on the warpath to take revenge. After Simon's refusal to cooperate with her, Vanessa exposes his identity as a swindler who is not the undercover cop he pretends to be. Meimei is disappointed in Simon and starts to doubt his feelings for her. Simon feels guilty for lying to Meimei for such a long time, and even though he has really fallen in love with her, he does not dare to reveal his feelings.

Vanessa carries on stirring up trouble by poisoning Dacheng's mind. She plants doubts and misunderstandings between Meimei and Dacheng, and instigates Ding Mu to come between Zhengde and Yingying. Vanessa also gangs up with an underworld leader to sell fake "HuiChunDan" medication to sabotage the company. She tries to get hold of evidence of Meimei's illegal dealings in the past, to fully carry out her plan of revenge. Simon finds out about Vanessa's plan, and immediately reports to Meimei.

But will Meimei believe him? Can Zhengde and Yingying find true happiness after going through so much hardship? Can Jiaojiao and Chunqiu weather storms together? What about the love triangle between Meimei, Simon, and Dacheng?

== Cast ==
Cast	Role
Zoe Tay	Yao Meimei
Tay Ping Hui	Simon
Rui En	Li Yingying
Huang Wenyong	Fang Chunqiu
Pan Lingling	Vanessa
Lin Meijiao	Yao Jiaojiao
Vincent Ng	Fang Zhengde
Zhang Yaodong	Ding Mu
Li Yinzhu	Lin Yayin
Rayson Tan	Li Dacheng
Yao Wenlong	911
May Phua	

== Accolades ==
Organisation	Year	Category	Nominees	Result	Ref.
Star Awards	2005	Best Supporting Actor	Yao Wenlong	Nominated	
