= Dragon Boys =

- Title card
- Written by: Ian Weir
- Directed by: Jerry Ciccoritti
- Starring: Byron Mann; Eric Tsang; Lawrence Chou; Tzi Ma; Lauren Lee Smith; Steph Song; Darryl Quon; Christina Ma; Jean Yoon; Simon Wong; Chang Tseng
- Theme music composer: Tim McCauley
- Countries of origin: Canada; Hong Kong
- Original languages: English; Cantonese; Mandarin; Khmer

Production
- Producers: Michael Chechik; Howard Dancyger; Ian Weir
- Cinematography: Danny Nowak
- Editor: Jane Morrison
- Running time: 240 minutes
- Budget: $4,000,000 CAD

Original release
- Network: CBC Television
- Release: January 7 – January 8, 2007

Dragon Boys (Chinese: 龍在他鄉) is a CBC Television (CBC) miniseries starring Eric Tsang, Byron Mann, Lawrence Chou, Tzi Ma, Lauren Lee Smith, Steph Song, Darryl Quon, Christina Ma, Jean Yoon, Simon Wong and Chang Tseng. It aired on CBC on January 7 and 8 of 2007.

== Synopsis ==
The film focuses on several stories about Asian Canadian organized gangs, set mostly in Vancouver and Richmond, British Columbia, Canada. One of them involves an Asian-Canadian Royal Canadian Mounted Police (RCMP) officer, Tommy Jiang (played by Mann), who is seeking to bring down two Asian gangsters named Willie the Duck and Movie Star (played by Tsang and Chou, respectively), in the process risking losing everything, including his marriage, as he goes deeper into the criminal organization. Eventually, the final showdown occurs between Movie Star and Jiang.

Another story focuses on the Wahs, an immigrant family from Hong Kong. The parents in that family (played by real life husband and wife Tzi Ma and Christina Ma) are concerned about their son Jason (played by Wong), who is constantly the victim of racial bullying. Jason soon receives help, but from a Chinese-Canadian youth with gang connections. They attempt a robbery but fail, and Jason is forced to flee for his life while his father Henry tries to save him.

The third story is about an illegal Cambodian immigrant named Chavy Pahn (Steph Song) who comes to Vancouver to seek a modelling career but is instead trapped in Canada with no friends, no passport and a $30,000 debt. Forced into prostitution at a senior gang member's wife's massage parlour because she cannot pay her debts, she seeks the help of a gang-enforcer (Quon), who befriends her, as means of escape.

In the conclusion of all three stories, Henry Wah receives a gun from Uncle Three later revealed to be his brother. Henry finds, confronts and berates Movie Star but finds himself unwilling to kill Movie Star as it won't make him feel any better. Jiang's investigations and frequent confrontations with Movie Star end up getting him framed and suspended from the RCMP, who receive a false complaint that Jiang was sleeping with a prostitute and had abused her. Jiang, who spends most of his time trying to catch and arrest Movie Star, who ordered a home invasion finally catches a confession from Movie Star, who admits to ordering of a home invasion which belonged to a cleaning lady who worked for Belinda Lok, Belinda who was sent the recording confronts and murders Movie Star after being handed over by Fox Boy to Belinda. Jason who was on the run from being involved manages to finally reunite with his family, as his parents scare off the triad teens who were attempting to silence him. Sorrows a Triad enforcer, protects Chavy Pahn from Fat-Ass and presumably kills him and removes Fat Ass's testicles as proof to Chavy has nothing to fear anymore but Chavy herself learns to become stronger and presumably takes Belinda's position however her relationship with Sorrows remains unclear. Willie Lok, Uncle Three and Au's older brother Lincoln Au discuss a drug deal but its secretly being tape recorded by the RCMP implying that the police will soon close in on them soon, thanks to Belinda who Jiang blackmails into recording their conversation to avoid jail time for murdering Movie Star. Jiang finally gets to see his family again but its left ambiguous if his wife will accept him again.

== Cast ==
=== Non-triad members ===
- Tommy Mun Long Jiang, Royal Canadian Mounted Police (RCMP) detective played by Byron Mann
- Chavy Pahn played by Steph Song
- Jason Wah played by Simon Wong
- Henry Wah played by Tzi Ma
- Mae Wah played by Christina Ma
- Mr. Yen played by Chang Tseng
- Mrs. Yen played by Chiu-Lin Tam
- Kath Maynard played by Lauren Lee Smith, The junkie girlfriend of "Fat-Ass"
- Jaz played by Kaaren de Zilva a stripper and one of Tommy Jiang's informants
- Cam Choi played by Keith Lim (RCMP SPT and superior of Tommy Jiang)
- Osric Chau plays a teenage boy employed by Colin's gang. (One of his early roles)

=== Triad members ===
- William Lok ("Willie the Duck") played by Eric Tsang
- Belinda Lok played by Jean Yoon
- Sorrows played by Darryl Quon
- Fox Boy AKA Edmand Chu played by Derek Tsang
- Movie Star AKA Simon Au played by Lawrence Chou The Main Antagonist of the Miniseries
- Lincoln Au AKA The Professor played by Edmund Kato Wong
- Fat Ass AKA Alder Wells played by Michael Adamthwaite
- Uncle Three AKA Tzi Jung played by Greg Chan later revealed to be Henry Wah's brother
- Aaron Chen played by Marcus Sim
- Colin Lee Yuen played by Rick Sam
- Benny played by Anthony Towe

=== The Sternig Brothers ===
- Rico Sternig played by David Coles murdered by Sorrows under orders by Willie Lok
- Dax Sternig played by Teach Grant murdered by Fox Boy under orders by Movie Star for being a loose end
- Corey Sternig played by Ben Cotton murdered by Fat Ass under orders by Movie Star for being a loose end

== Pre-filming preparation and research ==
Before filming for the miniseries began, Mann spent several weeks with Richmond's RCMP detectives to prepare for the role. Besides that, a year was spent researching Asian Canadian gangs in the Vancouver area, in cooperation with the RCMP.

In addition, the series' writer Ian Weir immersed himself in Asian Canadian and Asian American culture before writing the script. He also worked with some in the Chinese community during the script's writing, checking to see what worked and what didn't. This resulted in some of the tongue-in-cheek references made about Chinese stereotypes by some of the characters, such as Jiang, in the miniseries.

== Critical response and viewership ==
The critical response for Dragon Boys have been overwhelmingly positive, in large part due to its depth and realism resulting from the performances of the internationally based cast from Hong Kong, Canada and the United States. According to CBC executives, the producers of the miniseries have been given permission to start a sequel to Dragon Boys. The writers have already started writing the script, and the production is hoping to start filming in the fall of 2007.

However, the viewership numbers fell short of expectations on the first night, with approximately 383,000 viewers. It did slightly better on the finale the next night, with 391,000 viewers.

== Controversy and community involvement ==
Before the miniseries aired, there was concern from the Chinese Canadian community about possible backlash from other communities; the villains in the miniseries are predominantly Asian Canadian, leading to possibly racist implications. Some Chinese Canadian film and television personnel even threatened to boycott the miniseries. This led to the producers hiring several prominent Asian Canadians in the community to look over the script to filter out what could be insulting.

One of the changes made to accommodate Asian Canadians more was the omission of the character of a Caucasian police chief; it was decided that going with a white boss would be counter-productive to the story, and a senior Asian Canadian officer was added instead to add complexity to the script. Another change that was made took previously submissive and weak Asian female characters in the miniseries and making them outspoken and stronger. More Asian characters were also added to the protagonists' side, so not all the "bad guys" are Asian.

Despite the content of the miniseries, the writer and the director are both Caucasian. Steph Song (who plays Chavy Pahn) found that to be an advantage, in contrast to the alleged racism accusations made by the Chinese Canadian community before it aired. Song claimed that if the miniseries was written and directed by Chinese Canadians, there would be too much sympathy on the part of the Asian characters, and that the "truth" about the Asian drug dealing industry would not have been exposed in an adequate manner.

== Filming locations ==
The film was filmed in the Vancouver, Richmond and Langley, British Columbia area, but takes place in Richmond, a city famous for its Golden Village Asian district on No. 3 Road, as well as its large Asian community which makes up 60 percent of the city's population.

Some scenes were shot at one of the malls within the Golden Village, Parker Place. Because of the area's high concentration of Asian Canadians, Eric Tsang (a very well known actor in Hong Kong films) was mobbed by fans who recognized him.

Partly due to the setting of the miniseries, some of the songs on the series' soundtrack were performed by Asian Canadian musicians from Richmond.

== See also ==
- Triads
- Racism
- Ethnic stereotypes
