= Dim Sum Funeral =

2008 film by Anna Chi

- Directed by: Anna Chi
- Written by: Donald Martin
- Produced by: Clark Peterson
- Starring: Bai Ling; Steph Song; Talia Shire; Julia Nickson; Lisa Lu; Kelly Hu; Russell Wong
- Music by: Scott Starrett
- Release date: November 2008; AFI Fest
- Running time: 95 minutes
- Languages: English, Mandarin

Dim Sum Funeral is a 2008 comedy/drama film directed by Anna Chi and starring Kelly Hu, Bai Ling, Russell Wong, Steph Song and Talia Shire.

== Premise ==
After their mother dies, four Chinese-American siblings return to their Seattle home. As their mother wanted a traditional seven-day funeral, the estranged siblings stay the week and deal with their issues.

== Cast ==
Xiao family

- Lisa Lu as Mrs. Xiao, the matriarch
- Julia Nickson as Elizabeth ("Liz"), a daughter of Mrs. Xiao
- Russell Wong as Alexander ("Alex"), the son of Mrs. Xiao
- Françoise Yip as Victoria, a daughter of Mrs. Xiao
- Steph Song as Meimei, a daughter of Mrs. Xiao

Others

- Talia Shire as Viola, a Jewish friend of Mrs. Xiao
- Bai Ling as Dede, Meimei's girlfriend
- Curtis Lum as Bruce Lee, a Buddhist monk and prospective sperm donor to Meimei and Dede
- Adrian Hough as Michael, Liz's husband
- Isaah Brown as Jason, Victoria's son
- Tseng Chang as Zhou Lin, a friend of Mrs. Xiao, an eminent Chinese pianist, and Meimei's father
- Kelly Hu as Cindy, Alex's wife and a former Miss Taiwan
- Valerie Tian as Emily, Alex's daughter

== Reception ==
Dim Sum Funeral was widely panned by critics.

On the review aggregator website Rotten Tomatoes, 0% of 5 critics' reviews are positive, with an average rating of 3.3/10. Fionnuala Halligan of Screen Daily noted the film's "uneven tone", but she commended the set design and decoration by James Willcock.

== See also ==
- List of LGBT films directed by women
