= Spartacus (film) =

1960 film by Stanley Kubrick

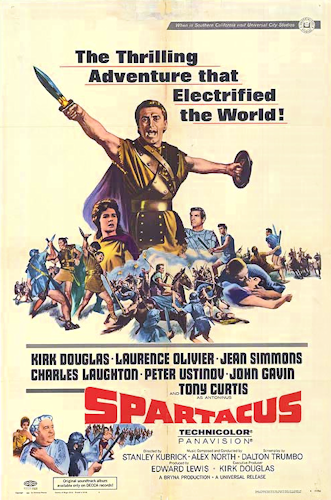
- Theatrical re-release poster (1967)
- Directed by: Stanley Kubrick
- Screenplay by: Dalton Trumbo
- Based on: Spartacus (1951 novel) by Howard Fast
- Produced by: Edward Lewis
- Starring: Kirk Douglas; Laurence Olivier; Jean Simmons; Charles Laughton; Peter Ustinov; John Gavin; Tony Curtis
- Cinematography: Russell Metty
- Edited by: Robert Lawrence
- Music by: Alex North
- Production company: Bryna Productions
- Distributed by: Universal International
- Release date: October 6, 1960 (DeMille Theatre, New York City)
- Running time: 197 minutes
- Country: United States
- Language: English
- Budget: $12 million
- Box office: $60 million (initial release)

Spartacus is a 1960 American epic historical drama film directed by Stanley Kubrick and starring Kirk Douglas as Spartacus, a slave and gladiator who leads a rebellion against Rome during the events of the Third Servile War. Adapted by Dalton Trumbo from Howard Fast's 1951 novel of the same title, the film also stars Laurence Olivier as Roman general and politician Marcus Licinius Crassus, Charles Laughton as rival senator Sempronius Gracchus, Peter Ustinov as gladiatorial school owner Lentulus Batiatus, and John Gavin as Julius Caesar. Jean Simmons played Spartacus' wife Varinia, a fictional character, and Tony Curtis played the fictional slave Antoninus.

Douglas, whose company Bryna Productions was producing the film, removed original director Anthony Mann after three weeks of shooting. Kubrick, with whom Douglas had made Paths of Glory (1957), took over as director. It was the only film directed by Kubrick where he did not have complete artistic control. Screenwriter Dalton Trumbo was blacklisted at the time as one of the Hollywood Ten. Douglas publicly announced that Trumbo was the screenwriter of Spartacus, and President John F. Kennedy crossed American Legion picket lines to view the film, helping to end blacklisting; Howard Fast's book had also been blacklisted and he had to self-publish the original edition.

The film won four Academy Awards (Best Supporting Actor for Ustinov, Best Cinematography, Best Art Direction and Best Costume Design) from six nominations. It also received six nominations at the Golden Globes, including Woody Strode’s only career Golden Globe nomination (for Best Supporting Actor), ultimately winning one (Best Motion Picture – Drama). At the time of the film’s release, it was the highest grossing film in Universal Studios' history, which it remained until it was surpassed by Airport (1970). In 2017, it was selected for preservation in the United States National Film Registry by the Library of Congress as being "culturally, historically, or aesthetically significant."

== Plot ==
In the first century BC, the Roman Republic has slid into corruption, its menial work done by slaves. One slave, a Thracian named Spartacus, is so uncooperative in his position in a mining pit that he is sentenced to death by starvation. By chance, he is displayed to Roman lanista (gladiatorial school manager) Lentulus Batiatus, who – impressed by his ferocity – purchases Spartacus for his school in Capua and instructs trainer Marcellus not to overdo his indoctrination, believing the slave "has quality". Amid the abuse, Spartacus forms a quiet relationship with Varinia, a serving woman, with whom he refuses to have sex with when she is sent to his cell because he doesn't want to force himself on her for the amusement of his captors. The two endure numerous humiliations for defying the conditions of servitude, including Varinia’s assignment to another gladiator.

Batiatus receives a visit from the fabulously wealthy and powerful Roman senator Marcus Licinius Crassus, who aims to become dictator of Rome. Crassus eventually buys Varinia, and for the amusement of his companions arranges for a private show, with Spartacus and three other gladiators to fight to the death. When Spartacus is disarmed, his opponent, an Ethiopian named Draba, spares his life in a burst of defiance and solidarity, and instead attacks the Roman audience, only to be speared in the back by a guard and then personally killed by Crassus. The next day, with the ludus's atmosphere still tense over this episode, Batiatus sends Varinia away to Crassus' house in Rome. When Marcellus taunts Spartacus over his affection for Varinia, Spartacus attacks Marcellus by drowning him in a pot of soup, and a riot breaks out. Batiatus flees while the gladiators overwhelm their guards and escape into the countryside.

Spartacus is elected chief of the fugitives and decides to lead them out of Italy and back to their homes. They plunder country estates as they go, collecting enough money to buy sea transport from the pirates of Cilicia, foes of Rome. Many slaves join the group, making it as large as an army. Among the new arrivals is Varinia, who escaped while being delivered to Crassus. Another is Antoninus, a slave entertainer who also fled Crassus' service after finding out the bisexual Crassus expected Antoninus to become his sex slave. Spartacus feels inadequate because of his lack of education. However, he proves an excellent leader and organizes his diverse followers into a tough and self-sufficient community. He and Varinia fall in love, and he soon impregnates her.

The Roman Senate becomes increasingly alarmed as Spartacus defeats every army sent against him. Crassus' opponent Gracchus knows that his rival will try to use the crisis as a justification for seizing control of the Roman army. To try to prevent this, Gracchus channels as much military power as possible into the hands of his own protégé, the young senator Julius Caesar. Although Caesar lacks Crassus' contempt for the lower classes of Rome, he mistakes the man's rigid outlook for a patrician. Thus, when Gracchus reveals that he has bribed the Cilicians to get Spartacus out of Italy and rid Rome of the slave army, Caesar regards such tactics as beneath him and goes over to Crassus.

Crassus bribes the pirates to abandon Spartacus and has the Roman army secretly force the rebels away from the coastline towards Rome. Amid panic that Spartacus means to sack the city, the Senate gives Crassus absolute power. Now surrounded by Roman legions, Spartacus persuades his men to die fighting. Just by rebelling and proving themselves human, he says that they have struck a blow against slavery. In the ensuing battle, most of the slave army is massacred. The Romans try to locate the rebel leader for special punishment by offering a pardon (and return to enslavement) if anyone will identify Spartacus or his corpse. Antoninus shouts "I'm Spartacus!" and his cry is taken up by others. Crassus sentences them all to death by crucifixion along the Via Appia, where the revolt began.

Finding Varinia and Spartacus' newborn son, Crassus takes them prisoner. He is disturbed by the idea that Spartacus can command more love and loyalty than he can, and hopes to compensate by making Varinia as devoted to him as she was to her former husband. When she rejects him, he guesses which man is Spartacus, and saves him for last, along with Antoninus. He forces them to fight to the death. The survivor is to be crucified. Spartacus kills Antoninus to spare him this terrible fate. The incident leaves Crassus worried about Spartacus' potential to live in legend as a martyr. In other matters, he is also worried about Caesar, whom he senses will someday eclipse him.

Gracchus, having seen Rome fall into tyranny, commits suicide. Before doing so, he bribes his friend Batiatus to rescue Spartacus' family from Crassus and take them away to freedom. On the way out of Rome, the group passes under Spartacus' cross. Varinia comforts him in his dying moments by showing him his son and promising he will grow up free and knowing who his father was.

== Cast ==
- Kirk Douglas as Spartacus
- Laurence Olivier as Crassus
- Jean Simmons as Varinia
- Charles Laughton as Gracchus
- Peter Ustinov as Batiatus
- John Gavin as Julius Caesar
- Nina Foch as Helena Glabrus
- John Ireland as Crixus
- Herbert Lom as Tigranes Levantus
- John Dall as Marcus Publius Glabrus
- Charles McGraw as Marcellus
- Joanna Barnes as Claudia Marius
- Harold J. Stone as David
- Woody Strode as Draba
- Peter Brocco as Ramon
- Paul Lambert as Gannicus
- Robert J. Wilke as Guard Captain
- Nicholas Dennis as Dionysius
- John Hoyt as Caius
- Frederic Worlock as Laelius
- Tony Curtis as Antoninus

== Production ==
=== Development ===
The development of Spartacus was partly instigated by Kirk Douglas' failure to win the title role in William Wyler's Ben-Hur (1959). Douglas had worked with Wyler before on Detective Story (1951), and was disappointed when Wyler chose Charlton Heston, instead. Shortly after, Edward Lewis, a vice president for Douglas's film company, Bryna Productions (named after Douglas's mother), had read Howard Fast's novel, Spartacus, which had a related theme—an individual who challenges the might of the Roman Empire. Douglas was impressed enough to purchase an option on the book with his own finances. He proposed the project to Arthur B. Krim, the head of United Artists, which was set to distribute The Vikings (1958), which also starred Douglas. Krim turned down the project as Yul Brynner had been developing his own Spartacus film, tentatively titled The Gladiators. Martin Ritt was set to direct, and he was incensed after learning about Douglas's rival project. Lewis then proposed merging the two projects, with Douglas and Brynner in leading roles. Brynner declined the offer, and proceeded to film The Gladiators after Ritt had finished editing The Sound and the Fury (1959).

Douglas's agent Lew Wasserman suggested he try having his film produced for Universal Studios. With Dalton Trumbo's screenplay being completed in two weeks, Universal and Douglas pulled ahead of Brynner's rival project. Brynner's project was later placed on hold as the weather conditions in Europe grew unsuitable for filming. Brynner then chose to film The Magnificent Seven (1960) instead. By the fall of 1958, Universal Studios eventually agreed to finance the film after Douglas persuaded Olivier, Laughton, and Ustinov to act in it. Olivier was also to direct the picture. Lewis became the producer of the film, with Douglas taking executive producer credit.

Douglas originally offered the role of Varinia to French actress Jeanne Moreau, but she did not want to leave her boyfriend in France. German actress Sabine Bethmann was then cast. The studio gave her the anglicized name of "Sabina Bethman" for use in the film's publicity, but she was replaced by Jean Simmons after only two days of filming.

=== Writing ===
Howard Fast was initially hired to adapt his own novel into a screenplay. After 60 days had passed, Kirk Douglas read Fast's first draft, which he described as a "disaster, unusable." Pressed for time, and in competition with Brynner's rival project, Douglas turned to Dalton Trumbo, who had been blacklisted as one of the "Hollywood 10". Trumbo did not like Fast as he found him to be narrow-minded in his Marxist views, but agreed to write a treatment. Trumbo submitted his treatment, which Douglas and Edward Lewis then gave to Fast stating this was their preferred direction for the screenplay. Fast refused to follow Trumbo's treatment, so Douglas hired Trumbo to write the final screenplay. Lewis was to serve as the front for Trumbo, with the latter receiving payments directed to his pseudonym "Sam Jackson".

Douglas insisted that Trumbo be given screen credit for his work, which helped to break the blacklist. Trumbo had been jailed for contempt of Congress in 1950, after which he had survived by writing screenplays under assumed names. Douglas publicly announced that Trumbo was the screenwriter of Spartacus. Further, President John F. Kennedy publicly ignored a demonstration organized by the American Legion and went to see the film.

In his autobiography, Douglas states that this decision was motivated by a meeting that Edward Lewis, Stanley Kubrick, and he had regarding whose names to list for the screenplay in the film credits, given Trumbo's shaky position with Hollywood executives. One idea was to credit Lewis as co-writer or sole writer, but Lewis vetoed both suggestions. Kubrick then suggested that his name be used. Douglas and Lewis found Kubrick's eagerness to take credit for Trumbo's work revolting, and the next day, Douglas called the gate at Universal saying, "I'd like to leave a pass for Dalton Trumbo." Douglas writes, "For the first time in 10 years, [Trumbo] walked on to a studio lot. He said, 'Thanks, Kirk, for giving me back my name.'"

In reality, the public announcement of Trumbo's screenwriting credit for Spartacus did not come until August 1960, seven months after producer-director Otto Preminger's January 20, 1960, announcement that he had hired Trumbo to adapt Leon Uris' novel Exodus for the screen. Douglas later successfully denied Trumbo credit for the film Town Without Pity, as he worried that his continued association with the screenwriter would hurt his career.

=== Filming ===
David Lean was offered but turned down an offer to direct Spartacus. Anthony Mann, best known for his Westerns which included Winchester '73 (1950) and The Naked Spur (1953), was instead hired. Filming started on January 27, 1959, in Death Valley, California for the opening sequence in the quarry. As filming continued, Douglas felt Mann had lost control of the film, writing in particular: "He seemed scared of the scope of the picture ... He let Peter Ustinov direct his own scenes by taking every suggestion Peter made. The suggestions were good—for Peter, but not necessarily for the film." On February 13, Mann left (or was fired from) the production. Mann did not discuss the reasons for his departure until shortly before his death in 1967, in which he stated: "Kirk Douglas was the producer of Spartacus: he wanted to insist on the message angle. I thought the message would go over more easily by showing physically all the horrors of slavery. A film must be visual, too much dialogue kills it ... From then, we disagreed: I left." A year later, Mann directed another epic of similar size, El Cid (1961). Principal photography ended in August 1959, although several battle scenes were filmed through October.

Large parts of the film were shot at Wildwood Regional Park in Thousand Oaks, California. Parts were also filmed at nearby California Lutheran University, where an army can be seen storming off Mount Clef Ridge. Additionally, scenes set in Marcus Licinius Crassus' villa were filmed at Hearst Castle.

Stanley Kubrick, then 31-years-old, was hired to take over. He had already directed three feature films (including Paths of Glory, also starring Douglas). Spartacus was a bigger project by far, with a budget of $12 million (equivalent to about $133 million in 2025) and a cast of 10,500, a daunting project for such a young director. Paths of Glory, his previous film, had only been budgeted at $935,000. Kubrick immediately fired Sabine Bethmann, who had only worked two days on the film. He and Douglas felt that she was not right for the role, so she was paid $3,000 to go home. Bethmann was replaced with Jean Simmons, who had been campaigning for the role. Douglas had originally chosen to cast Bethmann over Simmons because he imagined Varinia having a strikingly different accent from the aristocratic Romans, who were to be played mostly by actors with British accents. (The film deliberately portrayed the Roman aristocracy with British accents to emphasize their status and class distinctions, while more socially subordinate characters spoke with less refined or American-accented speech patterns.) Simmons was still available, and took over the role in the film with only a day's notice.

Spartacus was filmed using the 35 mm Super Technirama 70 format and then blown up to 70 mm film. This was a change for Kubrick, who preferred using the standard spherical format. This process allowed him to achieve ultra-high definition and to capture large panoramic scenes. Kubrick had wanted to shoot the picture in Rome with cheap extras and resources, but Edward Muhl, president of Universal Pictures, wanted to make an example of the film and prove that a successful epic could be made in Hollywood itself, and "stem the flood of 'runaway' producers heading for Europe". A compromise was reached by filming the intimate scenes in Hollywood, and the battle scenes, at Kubrick's request, in Spain. Kubrick found working outdoors or in real locations to be distracting, and he believed the actors would benefit more from working on a soundstage, where they could fully concentrate. To create the illusion of the large crowds that play such an essential role in the film, Kubrick's crew used three-channel sound equipment to record 76,000 spectators at a Michigan State – Notre Dame college football game shouting "Hail, Crassus!" and "I'm Spartacus!"

The battle scenes were filmed on a vast plain outside Madrid. About 8,000 trained soldiers from the Spanish infantry were used to double as the Roman army. Kubrick directed the armies from the top of specially constructed towers. However, he eventually had to cut all but one of the gory battle scenes, due to negative audience reactions at test screenings. So precise was Kubrick, that even in arranging the bodies of the slaughtered slaves he had each "corpse" assigned with a number and instructions. Shooting locations also included the countryside near Guadalajara and Iriépal.

Disputes broke out during the filming. Cinematographer Russell Metty, a veteran with experience working in big pictures such as Orson Welles' The Stranger (1946) and Touch of Evil (1958) and Howard Hawks's Bringing Up Baby (1938), complained about Kubrick's unusually precise and detailed instructions for the film's camerawork, and disagreed with Kubrick's use of light. On one occasion, he threatened to quit, to which Kubrick's response was: "You can do your job by sitting in your chair and shutting up. I'll be the director of photography." Metty later won the Oscar for Best Cinematography. Kubrick wanted to shoot at a slow pace of two camera set-ups a day, but the studio insisted that he do 32; a compromise of eight had to be made. Kubrick and Trumbo fought constantly over the screenplay. Kubrick complained that the character of Spartacus had no faults or quirks.

Despite the film being a huge box-office success, gaining four Oscars, and being considered to rank among the very best of historical epics, Kubrick later distanced himself from it. Although his personal mark is a distinct part of the final picture, his contract did not give him complete control over the filming, the only occasion he did not exercise such control over one of his films.

=== Music ===
The original score for Spartacus was composed and conducted by six-time Academy Award-nominee Alex North. North, who scored Viva Zapata!, was drawn to the revolutionary character of Spartacus because of his personal feelings towards the story and how he felt about his social world. It was nominated by the American Film Institute for its list of greatest film scores. It is a textbook example of how modernist compositional styles can be adapted to the Hollywood leitmotif technique.^{[needs citation]} North's score is epic, as befits the scale of the film. After extensive research of music of that period, North gathered a collection of antique instruments, while not authentically Roman, that provided a strong dramatic effect.^{[needs citation]} These instruments included a sarrusophone, Israeli recorder, Chinese oboe, lute, mandolin, Yugoslav flute, kythara, dulcimer, and bagpipes. North's prize instrument was the ondioline, similar to an earlier version of the electronic synthesizer, which had never been used in film before. Much of the music is written without a tonal center, or flirts with tonality in ways that most film composers would not risk. One theme is used to represent both slavery and freedom but is given different values in different scenes so that it sounds like different themes. The love theme for Spartacus and Varinia is the most accessible theme in the film, and a harsh trumpet figure was created for Crassus.

A soundtrack album was released on LP in 1960, containing selections from the score totaling 41 minutes. This album was released on CD in 1990, to coincide with the film's restoration. Soon after, Varèse Sarabande Records attempted to re-record 75 minutes of highlights from the score personally chosen by North, to be conducted by his friend and fellow film composer Jerry Goldsmith, but the project was delayed multiple times and remained unrecorded when Goldsmith died in 2004.

In 2010, Varèse Sarabande released a limited collector's edition of 5,000 copies, containing six CDs, one DVD, and a 168-page booklet. The first disc contained all 72 minutes of the score that survived in stereo, including all music from the 1960 album. Discs two and three featured the entire score to the film, in mono. Disc four contained alternate and preliminary cues from the original recording sessions. Discs five and six contained re-recordings of the film's iconic love theme, adapted by numerous modern film composers and other musicians. The DVD contained a documentary interviewing those same musicians about the score's impact.

== Release ==
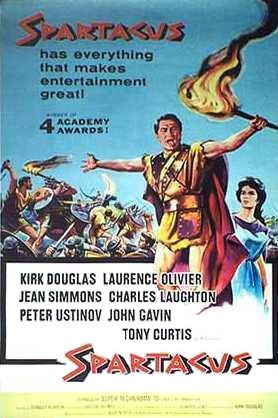
1961 post-Oscars theatrical poster by Reynold Brown

The film opened to the public on October 6, 1960, at the DeMille Theatre in New York City after four days of invitational previews. It played just 188 theatres in the United States and Canada in its first year and played for over a year at the DeMille before moving to the RKO Palace and opening in the New York circuit theaters around Thanksgiving 1961.

The film was re-released in 1967, without 23 minutes that had been in the original release. For the 1991 release, the same 23 minutes were restored by Robert A. Harris, as were another five minutes that had been cut from the film before its original release.

=== 1991 restoration ===
The idea for the film's restoration came about after the American Cinematheque asked Universal Pictures for a print of Spartacus for its three-day (October 13–15, 1989) celebratory festival honoring The Bryna Company and Kirk Douglas' executive producer accomplishments. They were later informed that the original negatives had been cut twice and the colors were badly faded. Steven Spielberg gave his backing to the restoration effort and recommended that Stanley Kubrick be informed of the project. Kubrick, who had disowned the film, gave his approval to the effort and participated by providing detailed instructions through long-distance communication via phone and fax machine from London. Kubrick's print of the film, which was donated to the Museum of Modern Art, could not be used for the restoration because it was considered archival. The original studio black-and-white separation prints, used as a backup in 1960, were used, though the processing lab had to develop a new lens capable of printing the Technirama frame without losing fidelity. The restoration cost about $1 million.

A team of 30 archivists restored several violent battle sequences that had been left out because of the negative reaction of preview audiences. Among the deleted footage was a bath scene in which the Roman patrician and general Crassus attempts to seduce his slave Antoninus, speaking about the analogy of "eating oysters" and "eating snails" to express his opinion that sexual preference is a matter of taste rather than morality. The four-minute scene had been removed following an objection by the National Legion of Decency. When the film was restored (two years after Olivier's death), the original dialogue recording of this scene was missing; it had to be redubbed. Tony Curtis, by then 66, was able to re-record his part, but Crassus' voice was an impersonation of Olivier by Anthony Hopkins, who had been suggested by Olivier's widow, Joan Plowright. A talented mimic, Hopkins had been a protégé of Olivier's during Olivier's days as the National Theatre's artistic director, and had portrayed Crassus in the Jeff Wayne musical album. The actors separately recorded their dialogue.

For the 1991 theatrical re-release, Universal Pictures partnered with the American Film Institute, in which the restored film premiered at the Directors Guild of America Theater in Los Angeles on April 25, with the proceeds going towards the AFI Preservation Fund and the Film Foundation. The general release began in Los Angeles, New York City, and Toronto on the following day. On May 3, the release was expanded into an additional 31 cities in the United States and Canada.

=== Home media ===
The film was first released on VHS in 1985 by MCA Home Video in a reconstructed version that reinstated most of the footage cut from subsequent reissues. The restored version was released on VHS by MCA/Universal in November 1991, and was subsequently released on LaserDisc by The Criterion Collection the following year. Criterion would later release the movie on DVD in 2001.

The film was released on Blu-ray in 2010 by Universal Pictures, but this release was panned by critics and fans alike, mainly due to the lackluster picture quality and sound. As a result, this release was highly controversial and did poorly in sales.

In 2015, for its 55th anniversary, the film went through an extensive 4K digital restoration, from a 6K scan of the 1991 reconstruction of the film, in which Robert A. Harris served as consultant. The 2015 restoration is 12 minutes longer and the original, six-channel audio track was also remixed and remastered in 7.1 surround sound. The film was re-released to Blu-ray Disc on October 6, 2015, featuring a 1080p transfer of the 2015 restoration in 2.20:1 aspect ratio and 7.1 DTS-HD Master Audio surround sound. Special features include a featurette on the 2015 restoration, a 2015 interview with Kirk Douglas, and several features from the Criterion Collection DVD.

On July 21, 2020, Universal Pictures Home Entertainment released the film on UHD Blu-ray.

The 2015 restoration had originally been scheduled to have its theatrical premiere in March 2015 at the TCM Classic Film Festival, but was pulled from the festival, and from a July 2015 engagement in Chicago, because the restoration had not been completed in time. The DCP version of the restoration played at Film Forum in New York City, November 4–12, 2015.

The Criterion Collection announced on June 22, 2026 that the film would be released on 4K as part of The Complete Kubrick box set.

== Reception ==
=== Box office ===
Spartacus was a commercial success upon its release and became the highest-grossing film of 1960. In its first year from 304 dates (including 116 in 25 countries outside the US and Canada), it had grossed $17 million, including nearly $1.5 million from more than half a million admissions in over a year at the DeMille Theatre. By January 1963, the film had earned theatrical rentals of $14 million in the United States and Canada. The 1967 re-release increased its North American rentals to $14.6 million.

=== Critical response ===
1960 trailer for the film

Variety declared in a contemporaneous review, "Spartacus appears to have what it takes to satisfy the multitudes ... Kubrick has out-DeMilled the old master in spectacle, without ever permitting the story or the people who are at the core of the drama to become lost in the shuffle. He demonstrates here a technical talent and comprehension of human values." John L. Scott of the Los Angeles Times praised the "fabulous cast," Trumbo's "expert screenplay" and "impressive" climactic battle scenes, writing, "Here young director Stanley Kubrick gives notice that from now on he's definitely to be reckoned with. His use of cameras and handling of people are very effective and skillful."

Richard L. Coe of The Washington Post wrote that the film "achieves the unlikely triumph of being intimate on a big scale, a lengthy spectacle consistently interesting for reasons that may vary from scene to scene." Harrison's Reports graded the film as "Very Good. A thinking man's star-studded spectacle." Brendan Gill of The New Yorker wrote that the protagonist's speeches "sound much more like Howard Fast ... talking to himself in the nineteen-fifties than they do like an illiterate warrior of the first century before Christ. What redeems the picture is several stretches of good acting, especially by Peter Ustinov and Laurence Olivier; the intrinsic interestingness of the physical details (accurately scaled interiors of Roman houses, Roman legions marching exactly as they must have marched); and the directorial aplomb of Stanley Kubrick, who handles his crowd scenes with extraordinary grace." Stanley Kauffmann writing for The New Republic said of Spartacus, "entertaining if mindless show, with many well-done scenes, intimate and panoramic."

Not all reviews were positive. Bosley Crowther of The New York Times called the film a "spotty, uneven drama" that "comes out a romantic mishmash of a strange episode in history. The performances are equally uneven. Mr Douglas sets his blunt, horse-opera style against the toga-clad precision of Mr Laughton and the Roman-nosed gentility of Sir Laurence Olivier." The Monthly Film Bulletin found it "disappointing" that "in spite of enormous expenditure, technical resource and an unusually talented team, so much of Spartacus falls into the old ruts of cliché and sentiment." The review noted that Douglas "probably has fewer lines than any other hero in screen history. Unhappily he does not make up for his verbal deficiencies by mobility of countenance, maintaining the same wooden grimace through more than three hours of trial and suffering." When released, the movie was attacked by both the American Legion and the Hollywood columnist Hedda Hopper because of its connection with Trumbo. Hopper stated, "The story was sold to Universal from a book written by a commie and the screen script was written by a commie, so don't go to see it."

Roger Ebert, reviewing the 1991 restored version, gave the film three stars out of four and wrote, "Two things stand up best over the years: the power of the battle spectacles, and the strength of certain performances – especially Olivier's fire, Douglas' strength, and Laughton's mild amusement at the foibles of humankind. The most entertaining performance in the movie, consistently funny, is by Ustinov, who upstages everybody when he is onscreen (he won an Oscar)."

On Rotten Tomatoes the film has an approval rating of 90% based on 107 reviews, with an average rating of 8.3/10. The critical consensus states: "Featuring terrific performances and epic action, Kubrick's restored swords-and-sandals epic is a true classic." On Metacritic it has a weighted average score of 87 based on 17 critics, indicating "universal acclaim".

=== Awards and nominations ===
Award	Category	Nominee(s)	Result
Academy Awards	Best Supporting Actor	Peter Ustinov	Won
Academy Awards	Best Art Direction – Color	Alexander Golitzen, Eric Orbom, Russell A. Gausman and Julia Heron	Won
Academy Awards	Best Cinematography – Color	Russell Metty	Won
Academy Awards	Best Costume Design – Color	Arlington Valles and Bill Thomas	Won
Academy Awards	Best Film Editing	Robert Lawrence	Nominated
Academy Awards	Best Music Score of a Dramatic or Comedy Picture	Alex North	Nominated
British Academy Film Awards	Best Film	Stanley Kubrick	Nominated
Golden Globe Awards	Best Motion Picture – Drama		Won
Golden Globe Awards	Best Actor in a Motion Picture – Drama	Laurence Olivier	Nominated
Golden Globe Awards	Best Supporting Actor – Motion Picture	Woody Strode	Nominated
Golden Globe Awards	Best Supporting Actor – Motion Picture	Peter Ustinov	Nominated
Golden Globe Awards	Best Director – Motion Picture	Stanley Kubrick	Nominated
Golden Globe Awards	Best Original Score – Motion Picture	Alex North	Nominated
Golden Reel Awards	Best Sound Editing – Feature Film		Won
Huabiao Awards	Outstanding Translated Foreign Film		Won
International Film Music Critics Awards	Best Archival Release of an Existing Score	Alex North; Robert Townson, Matthew Joseph Peak and Bill Pitzonka	Won
Laurel Awards	Top Male Dramatic Performance	Kirk Douglas	Nominated
Laurel Awards	Top Male Supporting Performance	Peter Ustinov	Nominated
National Film Preservation Board	National Film Registry		Inducted
Online Film & Television Association Awards	Hall of Fame – Motion Picture		Won
Saturn Awards	Best DVD Collection	Spartacus (as part of the Stanley Kubrick: The Essential Collection)	Won
Writers Guild of America Awards	Best Written American Drama	Dalton Trumbo	Nominated

=== Legacy ===
In June 2008, American Film Institute revealed its "10 Top 10"—the best 10 films in 10 "classic" American film genres—after polling more than 1,500 people from the creative community. Spartacus was acknowledged as the fifth-best film in the epic genre. The AFI also named Spartacus the 81st greatest film in American cinema in 2007.

American Film Institute Lists

- AFI's 100 Years...100 Movies (1998) – Nominated
- AFI's 100 Years...100 Thrills (2001) – #62
- AFI's 100 Years...100 Heroes and Villains (2003)
  - Spartacus – #22 Hero
- AFI's 100 Years...100 Movie Quotes (2005)
  - "I'm Spartacus! I'm Spartacus!" – Nominated
- AFI's 100 Years of Film Scores (2005) – Nominated
- AFI's 100 Years...100 Cheers (2006) – #44
- AFI's 100 Years...100 Movies (10th Anniversary Edition) (2007) – #81
- AFI's 10 Top 10 (2008) – #5 Epic Film

In 2025, The Hollywood Reporter listed Spartacus as having the best stunts of 1960.

== "I'm Spartacus!" ==
In the climactic scene, the recaptured slaves are offered their lives if they will identify Spartacus or his corpse. Spartacus starts to identify himself, but Antoninus proclaims himself to be Spartacus first. The rest of the survivors do the same, thus sharing his fate. The 2007 documentary Trumbo suggests that this scene was meant to dramatize the solidarity of those accused of being Communist sympathizers during the McCarthy era, who refused to implicate others, and thus were blacklisted.

This scene is the basis for an in-joke in Kubrick's next film, Lolita (1962), where Humbert asks Clare Quilty, "Are you Quilty?" to which he replies, "No, I'm Spartacus. Have you come to free the slaves or something?" Many subsequent films, television shows, and advertisements have referenced or parodied the iconic scene. One of these is the film Monty Python's Life of Brian (1979), which reverses the situation by depicting an entire group undergoing crucifixion all claiming to be Brian, who, it has just been announced, is eligible for release ("I'm Brian." "No, I'm Brian." "I'm Brian and so's my wife."). Further examples have been documented in David Hughes' The Complete Kubrick and Jon Solomon's The Ancient World in Cinema.

The audio of the scene was also played at the start of each Roger Waters's The Wall Live (2010–2013) tour show as an introduction to the song "In the Flesh?".

In an episode of the U.S. version of The Office, Michael Scott inadvertently reveals he does not understand the point of the "I am Spartacus!" moment. He says, "I've seen that movie half a dozen times, and I still don't know who the real Spartacus is" which he says is what makes the film a "classic whodunit."

The scene is referenced in the Starz television series, Spartacus: War of the Damned (2013), where many of Spartacus' lieutenants claim to be him while raiding separate areas of the Italian countryside. However, the purpose behind the line is different in this case, as Spartacus and his comrades are attempting to confuse their Roman adversaries about the rebel leader's whereabouts.

In the film That Thing You Do! (1996), drummer Guy Patterson (Tom Everett Scott) uses the catch phrase (as "I am Spartacus") numerous times to identify himself. He later spontaneously names his signature jazz solo "I am Spartacus" in the studio and then jams to it with Del Paxton (Bill Cobbs). The jazz drum solo was composed by Tom Hanks, the film's director.

== Political Commentary ==
The film parallels 1950s American history, specifically House Un-American Activities Committee (HUAC) hearings and the civil rights movement. The HUAC hearings, where witnesses were pressured to "name names" of communists and communist sympathizers, mirror the climactic scene as the defeated slaves, ordered by Crassus to identify their leader from the multitude, individually stand up and proclaim, "I'm Spartacus". Howard Fast, author of the original novel, had written Spartacus while in prison for refusing to name names to HUAC investigators. The fight to end segregation and to extend equality to African Americans is symbolized in the racial mixing in the gladiatorial school, as well as in the army of Spartacus, where all must battle for freedom. Another allusion to the political situation in the United States is hinted at in the beginning, when Rome is described as a republic "fatally stricken with a disease called human slavery", describing Spartacus as a "proud, rebellious son dreaming of the death of slavery, 2000 years before it finally would die". Thus an ethical and political vision becomes a philosophical framework for the ensuing action.

The introductory voice-over also describes Rome as destined to collapse with the rise of Christianity:

In the last century before the birth of the new faith called Christianity, which was destined to overthrow the pagan tyranny of Rome and bring about a new society, the Roman Republic stood at the very center of the civilized world. "Of all things fairest" sang the poet, "First among cities and home of the Gods is Golden Rome." Yet even at the zenith of her pride and power, the Republic lay fatally stricken with the disease called human slavery. The age of the dictator was at hand, waiting in shadows for the event to bring it forth. In that same century, in the conquered Greek province of Thrace, an illiterate slave woman added to her master's wealth by giving birth to a son whom she names Spartacus. A proud, rebellious son, who was sold to living death in the mines of Libya, before his 13th birthday. There, under whip and chain and sun, he lived out his youth and his young manhood, dreaming the death of slavery 2000 years before it finally would die.

Thus, Rome is described as an oppressive state suffering from its own excesses in the years before the adoption of Christian beliefs begins to end Roman oppression and slavery.

While the film's release occasioned applause from the mainstream media, it sparked protest from right-wing and anticommunist groups such as the National Legion of Decency, which picketed theaters exhibiting the film. The controversy over its "legitimacy as an expression of national aspirations" continued until newly elected US President John F. Kennedy crossed a picket line set up by anti-communist organizers to attend the film.

Owing to the film's leftist roots in Fast's novel, as well as the role of the Spartacus story in early 20th century communist movements like Spartacus League, it is possible to read the film against the backdrop of the HUAC and the emerging tensions in America—albeit in a more liberal sense.^{[citation needed]}

Alongside the film's revolutionary commentary, the film, like Fast's novel, makes commentary on Roman homosexuality. Crassus' attempted seduction of Antoninus in the scene about oysters and snails makes clear Fast's assertion that homosexuality was part of the political and moral decadence that led to Rome's collapse. This scene, while cut by Universal under pressure from the American Legion of Decency, is present in the 1991 release. According to Martin Winkler, Crassus' seduction and power over Antoninus represents the kind of moral decay that comes with unlimited power.

== In other media ==
=== Television ===
In the American TV show M*A*S*H, Hawkeye and BJ play charades, in which Spartacus is referenced. However, M*A*S*H* takes place during the Korean War, which ended in 1953, a full seven years before Spartacus was released, thereby making BJ's reference to "Spartacus" an historical impossibility.

In the American TV show Xena: Warrior Princess, the history of Spartacus is relayed by Homer as part of a storytelling contest, using clips from Kubrick's film. The credits contain the following disclaimer: The producers would like to acknowledge and pay tribute to Stanley Kubrick, Kirk Douglas and all those who were involved with the making of the film classic "SPARTACUS". Additional thanks to Steve Reeves.

=== Comic book ===
- Dell Four Color #1139 (November 1960)

=== Film ===
Il Figlio di Spartacus (The Son of Spartacus; English title: The Slave) is a 1962 Italian unofficial sequel to the film.

== See also ==
- List of American films of 1960
- List of films set in ancient Rome
- List of historical drama films
- List of films featuring slavery
- List of war films and TV specials set between 3050 BC and AD 476
- Spartacus (2010–2013 TV series)
