= Against the Tide (TV series) =

Singaporean TV series

- 逆潮
- Genre: Drama; Suspense; Psychological thriller
- Written by: Phang Kai Yee 彭凯毅; Lee Yen Chie 李燕淇
- Story by: Phang Kai Yee 彭凯毅
- Directed by: Loh Woon Woon 罗温温; Lim Mee Nah 林美娜; Lin Mingzhe 林明哲
- Starring: Christopher Lee; Rui En; Desmond Tan; Paige Chua; Zhang Zhenhuan; Xu Bin; Carrie Wong; Zheng Geping
- Opening theme: Black Winged Soul (黑翼心灵) by Lin Si Tong
- Ending theme: Love Hurt Crime (伤爱罪) by Antonio Huang
- Country of origin: Singapore
- Original languages: Mandarin with English and Chinese Subtitles
- No. of episodes: 23 (list of episodes)

Production
- Executive producer: Soh Bee Lian 苏美莲
- Producer: Paul Yuen 袁树伟
- Cinematography: Ang Soon Bee 洪顺美
- Running time: approx. 45 minutes

Original release
- Network: Mediacorp Channel 8
- Release: 24 September – 24 October 2014

Against the Tide (Chinese: 逆潮) is a psychological thriller drama produced by MediaCorp Channel 8. This drama features different crime cases. Each case lasts 3-5 episodes and features a main character of the case. The drama began production in March 2014 and wrapped up its filming in May 2014. It was aired from 24 September 2014 to 24 October 2014 and has a total of 23 episodes.

== Plot ==
Acclaimed novelist Di Shen's mission is to expose evil in humans, as he believes that all humans are born depraved. While Di Shen is doing a television interview, a girl escapes her captivity in which she was tortured and abused. As police officers Zhou Jianfeng and Guo Jingcheng fail to obtain information from the girl, they ask for help from the psychiatrist Qiu Xueqing who, through hypnosis reveals that the assailant had a copy of Di Shen's novel. Xueqing asks the novelist to help solve the case believing that the culprit is an imitator of his novels, but for Jianfeng, Di shen is the main suspect.

== Cast ==
=== Main cast ===
Cast	Role	Description	Episodes Appeared
Christopher Lee 李铭顺	Di Shen 狄深	Younger version played by Zong Zijie: Suspense Novelist; Di Yao's elder brother; Zhang Jingxuan's love interest; Zhuo Dingkang, Zhang Jingxuan's old friend; In love with Qiu Xueqin	1-23
Rui En 瑞恩	Qiu Xueqing 邱雪清	Dr. Snow, Snow White (白雪公主): Psychiatrist; Qiu Gangzheng's daughter; Qiu Gangyi's niece; Di Shen's girlfriend; Zhou Jianfeng's love interest	1-23
Desmond Tan 陈炯江	Zhou Jianfeng 周健锋	Assistant Superintendent; Zhou Yongjun and Guo Yalan's eldest son; In love with Qiu Xueqing; Di Shen's rival in love; Guo Jingcheng's best friend and superior; Killed by Shadow Walker / Zhuo Dingkang; (Deceased - Episode 23)	1–8, 11–16, 18-23
Paige Chua 蔡琦慧	Zhang Jing Xuan 张静璇	Teenage version played by Alicia Lo: Lawyer; Zhuo Dingkang's love interest; Qiu Xueqing's rival in love; Di Shen, Zhuo Dingkang's old friend; In love with Di Shen; Killed by Scarlet and Qiu Xueqing; (Deceased - Episode 22)	3, 6–10, 12–14, 17–20, 22
Zhang Zhenhuan 张振寰	Zhuo Dingkang 卓定康	Forensic Pathologist; In love with Zhang Jingxuan; Di Shen's rival in love; Di Shen, Zhang Jingxuan's old friend; Xie Honglie's best friend; Shadow Walker; (Deceased - Episode 23)	6–10, 12–14, 17–20, 22-23
Carrie Wong 黄思恬	Di Yao 狄遥	Younger version played by Lorraine Koh: Psychological Counselor; Di Shen's younger sister; Qiu Xueqing and Zhang Jingxuan's friend; Liu Zebang's counselor and best friend; Studies psychology in university; Chen Lina's friend	1–18, 20-23
Carrie Wong 黄思恬	Scarlet	Di Yao's split identity	14–17, 21-23
Zheng Geping 郑各评	Qiu Gangyi 邱刚毅	Nails (铁钉): Private Detective; Qiu Gangzheng's younger brother; Qiu Xueqing's paternal uncle; Often made Qiu Xueqing to go on a morning jog with him; Detests Di Shen; (Deceased - Episode 19)	1–4, 6–12, 14-19
Xu Bin 徐彬	Guo Jingcheng 郭精诚	Cartoon: Police Detective; Zhou Jianfeng's best friend and subordinate; (Deceased - Episode 14)	1–8, 11-14
Zhang Zhenxuan	Shadow Walker	Tortured Yang Zhenye (Episode 3), Zheng Tianrui (Episode 7–8) and Luo Jinzhu (Episode 11); Liu Zebang's accomplice; Kidnapped Zheng Tianrui in the presence of Zhou Jianfeng in Episode 7; Aired a 'live' screening on an online video portal site, asking netizens to vote for Zheng Tianrui's ultimate fate in Episode 8; Gave Di Shen the anaesthetic and drove him to a deserted area by Di Shen's jeep in Episode 10; Appears again in the video portal site to give the police 24 hours to find Jacob's body in Episode 17; Revealed himself in Episode 20; Launched a live recording of the punishment of Hong Qiming in Episode 23	3–5, 7–8, 11, 17, 19, 22-23

=== Qiu (Xueqing) family ===
Cast	Character	Description	Episodes Appeared
Wang Yuqing	Qiu Gangzheng 邱刚正	University Professor who teaches in the same university as Li Aiqin, Xie An Ni and Tina Loh; Qiu Gangyi's elder brother Qiu Xueqing's father Chen Lina's professor and rumoured lover Tang Rongyao's professor Died from a heart attack when being kidnapped and interrogated by the 'Shadow Walker' organisation (Deceased - 7 years ago)	3, 8–11, 20

=== Police Headquarters ===
Cast	Character	Description	Episodes Appeared
James Fong	Anton	Police detective working under Zhou Jianfeng	1–6, 8, 11–12, 14–16, 18-22
江熙祥	Julius	Police detective working under Zhou Jianfeng	2–6, 8, 11–16, 20-22
Rio Chan 曾佳平	Ah Hu 阿虎	Police detective working under Zhou Jianfeng	1–6, 8, 11–17, 20-22
巫满文	Da Tou 大头	Police detective working under Zhou Jianfeng	16–17, 20

=== Zhou (Jianfeng) family ===
Cast	Character	Description	Episodes Appeared
秋文	Zhou Yongjun 周勇骏	Provision shop owner Guo Yalan's husband Zhou Jianfeng's father	21-23
Teo Ser Lee	Guo Yalan 郭雅兰	Provision shop lady boss Zhou Yongjun's wife Zhou Jianfeng's mother	21-22

=== Serial Kidnapping incident (ep 1-3) ===
Cast	Role	Description	Episodes Appeared
Allen Chen	Yang Zhenye 杨振业	Jack; J. Fighters Club shareholder Appears in Di Shen's book event in episode 1 Jennie's boyfriend A serial kidnapper and killer Murdered Agnes Lim; Killed Jennie on her own request after getting tortured by kidnappers for failing to get a ransom	1-3
Tang Lingyi	Agnes Lim	Qiu Xueqing's patient Murdered by Yang Zhenye (Deceased - Episode 1)	1
Narelle Kheng 金甄旗	Jennie	Yang Zhenye's girlfriend Killed by Yang Zhenye on her own request after getting tortured by kidnappers for failing to get a ransom	2-3
徐啸天	Tom	J. Fighters Club shareholder	1, 3
Chen Ning	Female Host 女主持人	Host of the television show	1
Louis Wu	Tony	Di Shen's loyal fan Appears in Di Shen's book event in episode 1	1

=== Tear Gas Bombing incident (ep 3-6) ===
Cast	Role	Description	Episodes Appeared
Shane Pow	Liu Zebang 刘泽邦	Mastermind of the 'Tear Gas Bombing' incidents Liu Xiaojing's elder brother Chemist at a laboratory Di Yao's patient and best friend Likes Di Yao	3-6
Bonnie Loo	Liu Xiaojing 刘晓静	Liu Zebang's younger sister Hospitalized due to kidney disease	3-6
Chantalle Ng	Judith Tan	Chen Baisheng's daughter College student	4-5
Dylan Quek 郭景豪	Nicholas Goh	Dr. Goh	5
Marcus Mok	Chen Baisheng 陈百胜	Dr. Tan	5

=== Vampire Hunter (ep 6-8) ===
Cast	Role	Description	Episodes Appeared
Yuan Shuai	Zheng Tianrui 郑天瑞	Qiu Xueqing's patient	6-8
陈思燕	Zena Ng	Zheng Tianrui's neighbour	7-8
Zakk Lim 林绍凯	Huang Zhiqiang 黄志强	Zena Ng's father; sexually abused her	7-8

=== Missing Girls Case (ep 9-11) ===
Cast	Role	Description	Episodes Appeared
Hong Huifang	Luo Jinzhu 罗金珠	Hostel Cleaner; Luo Baoqiang's mother	9–11, 19
Zheng Rongming	Tang Rongyao 唐荣耀	Qiu Gangzheng's student	9
Jayley Woo	Huang Liqi 黄莉琦	Studies in the same university as Li Aiqin, Xie An Ni and Tina Loh; Li Aiqin's best friend Di Shen's fan	9-10
Ivan Tan 陈永文	Luo Baoqiang 罗宝强	Intellectually disabled Luo Jinzhu's son	10–11, 19
林楚璇	Li Aiqin 李爱琴	Studies in the same university as Xie An Ni, Tina Loh and Huang Liqi	9, 11
Shine Koh	Chen Lina 陈丽娜	Qiu Gangzheng's student and rumoured lover Di Yao's secondary school friend	9-11
蔡龙	Wu Zhiguang 吴智光	A sexual pervert	10
Kwek Hock Choon 郭福春	Lina's father 丽娜父	Chen Lina's father	10

=== Hammering Assault incident (ep 11-14) ===
Cast	Role	Description	Episodes Appeared
Cavin Soh	Chen Zhifeng 陈志丰	Mastermind behind the Hammering Assault incidents	11-14
Tan Si Yan 陈思燕	Jolie		12-13
Tracer Wong 王裕香	Meiyun 美韵		
Alicia Tan 陈欣如	Female Passerby 女路人		12-13

=== 'Forest-Hunt' murder case (ep 15-19) ===
Cast	Role	Description	Episodes Appeared
Aloysius Pang	Zhao Keji 赵克已	Zhao Junlong's son: Killed himself after jumping off the hospital's top floor; (Deceased - Episode 21)	15-21
Brandon Wong	Zhao Junlong 赵俊龙	Police; Qiu Gangyi's colleague and friend Zhao Keji's father	15-19
王紫绮	Zhang Xiaoyang 张晓阳	Lin Guoliang's worker Ivy's mother	15
陈天赐	Gu De An 顾德安	One of Zhao Keji's past accomplice's uncle	15
郑瑞和	Wang Youren 王友仁	One of Zhao Keji's past accomplice's uncle	18-19

=== Confining Girls Incident (ep 15-17) ===
Cast	Role	Description	Episodes Appeared
James Seah	Jacob Thang	Jimmy and Zen's friend In a love-hate relationship with Scarlet	15-18
林伟胜	Zen	Jacob and Jimmy's pal	15-17
林祚纬	Jimmy	Jacob and Zen's pal	15-17

=== New 'Shadow Walker' organisation (ep 18-20) ===
张华珉	Wu Zhiqun 吴智群	New Shadow Walker organisation's first target	19-20

=== Turning Evil (ep 20-23) ===
Cast	Role	Description	Episodes Appeared
Tracer Wong	Liao Meiyun 廖美韵	Di Shen and Di Yao's mother	6–7, 12–13, 20-21
Zhang Xinxiang	He Hailiang 何海量	Owner and stock taker of a chain of convenience stores Shuzhen's husband He Meiting's father Zhou Jianfeng's family previous part-time driver	21-23
Welyn Ang	Shuzhen 淑珍	He Hailiang's wife He Meiting's mother	21-22
Tan Mei Kee	He Meiting 何美婷	He Hailiang and Shuzhen's daughter	21
Remus Teng 丁森炎	Hong Qiming 洪启明		23

== Viewerships ==
Against The Tide had an average of 937,000 views, becoming the 7th most watched drama series of 2014, following behind Three Wishes, C.L.I.F. 3, The Caregivers, Blessings, The Journey: Tumultuous Times, and World at Your Feet. Viewership in 2014 increased significantly, with the top-rated drama serial of 2013, C.L.I.F. 2, only having 901,000 viewers, and the top 10 drama serials having at least 930,000.

== Trivia ==
- Christopher Lee's 2014 drama series after Game Plan.
- Carrie Wong's debut MediaCorp Channel 8 drama and first villainous and dual role, where she plays a villain due to mental illness.
- Rui En's first villainous role, where she plays a villain at the end of the drama. It is also the first time she will portray a psychiatrist. In the series, she also steps into the mind of the criminal concerned.
- Zhang Zhenhuan's first villainous role.
- Paige Chua's first villainous role.
- Aloysius Pang's first villainous role, where he played a villain due to mental illness.
- This will be the first series to have five of the "8 Dukes of Caldecott Hill" appear.
- Snippets of the next episode were shown during the ending credits of each episode, but in rewind motion.
- Ian Fang was reportedly offered a role in the series, but turned it down so that he could take a break.
- The series was mentioned twice by Dennis Chew in 118. In episode 92, he mentioned that the characters in the series killed people using knives, while in episode 201, he mentioned Rui En could not be differentiated between a good woman and a bad woman.

== Awards and nominations ==
=== Star Awards 2015 ===
Against The Tide has the second most number of nominations for Star Awards 2015 behind The Journey: Tumultuous Times with 16 nominations in 13 awards, winning 3 of them - Best Programme Promo, Best Director and Best Cameraman.

The Star Awards are presented by Mediacorp.

Star Awards – Acting Awards
Nominees	Accolades	Category	Result
《黑翼心灵》 by Lin Si Tong	Star Awards	Best Theme Song	Nominated
Kee Chee Wee	Star Awards	Best Programme Promo	Won
Loh Woon Woon	Star Awards	Best Director	Won
Phang Kai Yee	Star Awards	Best Screenplay	Nominated
Ang Soon Bee	Star Awards	Best Cameraman for Drama Programme	Won
Gao Jun Wei and Yong Chin Liang	Star Awards	Best Music and Sound Design	Nominated
Xu Bin	Star Awards	Favourite Male Character	Nominated
Rui En	Star Awards	Favourite Female Character	Nominated
Aloysius Pang	Star Awards	Rocket Award	Nominated
Paige Chua	Star Awards	Rocket Award	Nominated
Christopher Lee	Star Awards	Best Actor	Nominated
Rui En	Star Awards	Best Actress	Nominated
Aloysius Pang	Star Awards	Best Supporting Actor	Nominated
Zhang Zhen Huan	Star Awards	Best Supporting Actor	Nominated
Paige Chua	Star Awards	Best Supporting Actress	Nominated
Paige Chua	Star Awards	Tokyo Bust Express Sexy Babe Award	Nominated
—N/a	Star Awards	Best Drama Serial	Nominated

== See also ==
- List of Against The Tide episodes
- List of MediaCorp Channel 8 Chinese drama series (2010s)
