= Roulette (DC Comics) =

Roulette is the name of several supervillains in the DC Comics universe. The Victoria Sinclair version of Roulette runs an underground fight club called the "House" and has dealt with the Justice Society of America on different occasions.

== Publication history ==
Roulette first appeared in JSA Secret Files #2 (September 2001) and was created by Geoff Johns and Derec Aucoin.

== Fictional character biography ==
=== Debra Sinclair ===
Debra Sinclair was the original Roulette who ran a conventional casino and fought Terry Sloane.

=== Victoria Sinclair ===
Roulette

Publication information
- Publisher: DC Comics
- First appearance: JSA Secret Files #2 (September 2001)
- Created by: Geoff Johns; Derec Aucoin

In-story information
- Full name: Victoria Sinclair
- Abilities: Business management

Victoria Sinclair is the granddaughter of Debra Sinclair. She believes Sloane to be her grandfather, but it is indicated that her grandfather was actually Sloane's brother Ned. Having encountered the second Mister Terrific (Michael Holt) during one of her schemes, she has come to view him as an unworthy successor to Sloane. Roulette runs an arena called the House, where she captures heroes and pits them against each other. In her first appearance, Roulette captures the Justice Society of America and forces them to fight one another. However, all of them manage to escape their traps. Roulette teleports the JSA away before they can capture her.

In the storyline "One Year Later", Doctor Mid-Nite infiltrates Roulette's fight club in search of information regarding purported organ trafficking. However, Roulette agrees to only give him information if he beats her bodyguard in a game of arm wrestling. Mid-Nite succeeds and is given the name of a model who had surgically implanted wings. After Mid-Nite leaves, Roulette informs Delores Winters of Mid-Nite's investigations.

Roulette later has a game going with Amos Fortune. They each play with cards that represent the JLA and the Royal Flush Gang. In turn, they each bet that one can beat the other, respectively. Eventually though, it is revealed that Roulette was merely gathering data on the JLA, Fortune, and his Gang. She is shown to be working (perhaps against her will) under the Key and his master.

=== Veronica Sinclair ===
Veronica Sinclair is the daughter of Debra Sinclair and mother of Victoria Sinclair.

In The New 52 continuity reboot, Veronica Sinclair is established as seeking the position of "Greatest Thief of All Time". She organizes a race of thieves, competing against Catwoman, Mirror Master, Swindle, and Vice. Unbeknownst to them, Roulette has rigged the race and hired Swindle and Vice to take out the competition. Catwoman and Mirror Master work together to defeat Roulette, who reluctantly admits that Catwoman is the greatest thief.

== Powers and abilities ==
The Victoria Sinclair version of Roulette has no apparent superhuman abilities, but is a genius in calculating odds and gambling winnings. She is also an expert at business management.

The Veronica Sinclair version of Roulette was an expert thief.

=== Equipment ===
The Victoria Sinclair version of Roulette wields robot security dogs similar to those found on Apokolips, automated security devices, and a series of death traps.

== In other media ==
- The Victoria Sinclair incarnation of Roulette appears in Justice League Unlimited, voiced by Virginia Madsen. This version runs an underground fight club called "Meta-Brawl" and is an ally of the Secret Society.
- The Victoria Sinclair incarnation of Roulette appears in a self-titled episode of Smallville, portrayed by Steph Song. This version is a mercenary and actress with a reputation for always completing her contracts. In the episode "Prophecy", Roulette appears as a member of Toyman's Marionette Ventures.
- The Victoria Sinclair incarnation of Roulette appears in Scribblenauts Unmasked: A DC Comics Adventure.
- The Veronica Sinclair incarnation of Roulette appears in the second season of Supergirl, portrayed by Dichen Lachman. This version is a wealthy socialite who initially holds illegal alien fight clubs. In the episode "Supergirl Lives", Roulette starts a human slave trade on the planet Maaldoria.
