= Achar! =

Singaporean sitcom

- Starring: Jas Arora; Steph Song; Rui En; Lim Ru-Ping; Timothy Loh; Malti Lalwani; Bridget Fernandez; Christian Lee; Nuraliza Osman; Rajesh Sabari
- Country of origin: Singapore

Production
- Production company: Mediacorp Studios

Original release
- Network: Mediacorp Channel 5
- Release: December 2004 – 2005

Achar! (English: Pickle) is a Singaporean English language sitcom that aired for two seasons, from December 2004 until late 2005. It starred Bollywood star Jas Arora, Lim Ru-Ping, Malti Lalwani, Timothy Loh, Steph Song, Rajesh Sabari a.k.a. Rajoo and Rui En. It revolved around an Indian man Ajay Chhabria (portrayed by Arora), who marries a Singaporean girl (played by Song and later Rui En). In some episodes is a special appearance by Nuraliza Osman, who plays Ajay's ex-girlfriend. Other cast members portray members of the couple's family. Its reruns were sometimes shown on MHz Worldview; before that, AZN Television held first-run American rights.

== Cast ==
- Jas Arora as Ajay Chhabria
- Steph Song
- Rui En
- Lim Ru-Ping
- Timothy Loh
- Malti Lalwani
- Bridget Fernandez
- Christian Lee
- Nuraliza Osman
- Rajesh Sabari

== Episodes ==
=== Season 2 ===
No.	Title	Directed by	Written by	Original release date
1	"The Anniversary"	TBA	TBA	TBA
It’s a memorable first anniversary when Ajay and Steph both forget their big day. Last minute romance becomes a messy affair, when Uma and the Changs get involved to plan the most romantic first anniversary ever.
2	"Ni Hao Ma"	TBA	TBA	TBA
Ajay learns Mandarin to help improve his prospects at work. Stephanie thinks it’s a great idea until Uma decides that she has to learn Hindi as well.
3	"Time Together"	TBA	TBA	TBA
Ajay and Steph make the effort to spend more time together. They decide to take up fencing. The competition starts up and Ajay realizes that it isn’t always the best man that wins.
4	"Pimple Boy"	TBA	TBA	TBA
His friends think that Walter is “uncool” because he’s got a huge pimple on his forehead. Uma decides to help him be “cool” by clearing up his complexion. Walter has other ideas about what “cool” looks like
5	"She Works Hard for the Money"	TBA	TBA	TBA
Infuriated with work 24/7 and no personal time on nights and weekends, Stephanie decides to quit her job at the advertising agency. What will Stephanie do with all her time? Meanwhile, Owen meets Ajay’s ex-girlfriend Priya and goes crazy over her.
6	"What a Tangled Hair Web We Weave"	TBA	TBA	TBA
When Uma goes shopping, everyone wants her autograph. Could she be the famous cooking oil lady on television? Walter has his own adoring fan too. She’s a little girl with a huge crush on Walter.
7	"Boss Ajay"	TBA	TBA	TBA
8	"The Thin Blue Line"	TBA	TBA	TBA
Owen begs everyone to tell him how to find Priya. Rosalind purchases a pregnancy test kit.
9	"Chang Chang Chang"	TBA	TBA	TBA
Stephanie has come down with chicken pox, scaring Ajay out of their apartment. Rosalind and Uma take classes in Chinese Opera, scaring everyone. Owen continues to chase after Priya.
10	"A Man of Substance"	TBA	TBA	TBA
With Stephanie away on business, Ajay wants some alone time. He ends up accidentally insulting Uma who gets revenge by using Owen as a son-substitute; but Owen is using Uma to get Priya's attention.
11	"All I Have to do is Dream"	TBA	TBA	TBA
Vincent comes out of retirement to take up his dream job, making Stephanie feel that she may be holding Ajay back from his ideals.
12	"Scent of a Woman"	TBA	TBA	TBA
Ajay's female boss aggressively peruses him. Vincent has been hired as a substitute mathematics teacher and is harassed by the students. It appears that Priya may give in to Owen's relentless attention.
13	"New York, New York"	TBA	TBA	TBA
The bank offers Ajay his dream job; a two-year posting in New York, but Stephanie does not want to go.

== Accolades ==
Year	Organisation	Award	Nominated work	Ref
2005	New York Festivals TV & Film Awards	Best International Situation Comedy	—N/a	
