= Love at 0 °C =

Singaporean drama series

- 爱情零度C
- Genre: Modern Drama
- Starring: Elvin Ng; Rui En; Julian Hee; Michelle Saram
- Opening theme: 解冻 by Rui En
- Country of origin: Singapore
- Original language: Mandarin
- No. of episodes: 20

Production
- Running time: approx. 45 minutes

Original release
- Network: MediaCorp; MediaCorp TV Channel 8
- Release: 10 July – 4 August 2006

Related
- C.I.D.; Time To Heal

Love at 0 °C is a Singaporean drama series which aired on Mediacorp Channel 8. It debuted on 10 July 2006 and consists of 20 episodes. The cast consisted of mostly relative newcomers and younger artistes.

== Synopsis ==
Sun Yixin is an aspiring fashion designer but is unable to find a job. Her friend Xiaoling aspires to enter high society and marry a rich man's son and often drags Yixin along to high-class parties. Yixin's mother forces her to help out with her cleaning business. She is forced to do the cleaning herself when she discovers that the business is in debt due to her mother's negligence. Her first assignment was to clean the house of Hu Zhitao, an irascible old man who looks after his grandson with an iron hand and happens to be Guobin's father.

Yixin and Hu Guobin were classmates at design school and share a love-hate relationship. She Weixiang and his partner Victor run a dinner dress rental and auction business. Although from a wealthy background, he is estranged from his father and detests him for having a mistress. By chance, Yixin bumps into them and her fashion expertise comes into handy. A love triangle inevitably forms.

== Cast ==
=== Main cast ===
- Elvin Ng as She Weixiang
- Rui En as Sun Yixin
- Julian Hee as Hu Guobin
- Michelle Saram as Anna

=== Supporting cast ===
- Xiang Yun as Liao Qunfang, Yixin's mother
- Chen Tianwen as Sun Zaifa, Yixin's father
- Felicia Chin as Mai Xiaoling
- Chen Shucheng as Hu Zhitao
- Terence Cao as Hu Guojun
- Zen Chong as Victor
- Wang Yuqing as She Jingyuan, Weixiang's father
- Kyle Chan
- Rebecca Lim
- Vivian Lai as Liu Siqi
- Kelvin Tan
- Chen Guohua
- Ezann Lee as Coco

== Awards and nominations ==
Awards
Category	Recipients (if any)	Result
Young Talent Award 青平果奖	Kyle Chan 陈星余	Nominated
Best Drama Serial 最佳电视剧	—N/a	Nominated

== Production ==
=== Soundtrack ===
The theme song of this show is sung by Rui En, and it is her first drama theme song

== See also ==
- List of programmes broadcast by Mediacorp Channel 8
