= Qu Yuan (film) =

- Directed by: Fong Pau; Xian Xu
- Written by: Moruo Guo
- Produced by: Feng Huang Motion Pictures,
- Starring: Tseng Chang; Fong Pau; Ching Lee
- Release date: 1977
- Running time: 118 minutes
- Countries: China; Hong Kong
- Language: Mandarin

Qu Yuan (Chinese: 屈原) is a 1977 Chinese historical drama film directed by Fong Pau,. The film tells the tragedy of the great Chinese ancient poet Qu Yuan during the Warring States period.

== Cast ==
- Tseng Chang as Zhang Yi
- Ching Lee as King Huai of Chu
- Fong Pau as Qu Yuan
- Hee Ching Paw as Chanjuan
- Wu Weng as Yu Song
