= Jas Arora =

Indian model and Bollywood actor

- Born: Amritsar, Punjab, India
- Occupations: Actor, model
- Years active: 1998–2016
- Notable work: Dushman ( 1998 Movie) Gud naar Ishq ( Music video) Ek Paheli Leela

Jas Arora is an Indian model and Bollywood actor, best known for his appearance in the music video "Gur Naalo Ishq Mitha" (1998). He comes from a Punjabi background.

== Present ==
Jas has collaborated with an Italian brand named Tod's.

== Acting career ==
=== Filmography ===
- Main Solah Baras Ki (1998) as Sunil Sethi
- Dushman (1998) as Kabir Suraj
- Monsoon Wedding (2001) as Umang Chadha
- Danger (2002) as Saurabh
- Chalte Chalte (2003) as Sameer
- Pyaar Ke Side Effects (2006) as Vivek Chaddha
- Ek Paheli Leela (2015) as Prince Bikram
- Freaky Ali (2016) as Vikram Rathore

=== Television ===
- Tamanna House (2004) as Dilip
- Achar! (2004–05) as Ajay Chhabria
- Dharti Ka Veer Yodha Prithviraj Chauhan (2006) as Someshwar
- Ssshhhh...Phir Koi Hai (2007) as Thakur

=== Music videos ===
- Gur Naalo Ishq Mitha (1998)
- Mera Laung Gawacha (1998)
- Yaaro Sab Dua Karo (1998)
