= Steph Song =

Malaysian actress

- Born: Malaysia
- Years active: 2001–present

Chinese name
- Traditional Chinese: 宋琇萱
- Simplified Chinese: 宋琇萱
- Hanyu Pinyin: Sòng Xiù Xuān
- Jyutping: Sung3 Sau3 Hyun1
- Hokkien POJ: Sòng Siù-soan
- Tâi-lô: Sòng Siù-suan

Steph Song (Chinese: 宋琇萱) is a Malaysian actress of Chinese descent, raised in Saskatoon, Saskatchewan, Canada and Australia. She was voted sexiest woman in the world by Asian readers of FHM magazine. Song has received five Leo Award nominations and one Gemini Award nomination for her TV and film work in Canada and the United States.

== Career ==
Song acted mostly on a freelance basis in Singapore in her early career, and was the female lead in the second season of Heartlanders, as well as the first season of Achar!, which won Bronze Medal at the New York Television Awards and has since been sold to 10 countries. Another show that Steph was in, titled Singapore Short Story Project, won best Drama Series at the Asian Television Awards in 2004.

In 2004, Song joined SPH MediaWorks, and was supporting lead in "Perceptions" and female lead in the very last Channel i-produced drama Six Weeks which won Best Drama Series at the Asian Television Awards 2005. When MediaWorks merged with MediaCorp later that year, Song did not move over to MediaCorp choosing instead to move to North America, where she found success, nominated 6 times in the last five years for her work as female lead actress on features Dim Sum Funeral, The Thaw, Paradox, the CBC's miniseries Dragon Boys, War, and two Douglas Coupland written projects: Everything's Gone Green and, more recently, the 2008 TV series jPod.

Song is currently represented by Echelon Talent Management Inc.

She portrayed the character of Roulette on The CW's Smallville.

== Honours ==
- Voted "Number 1 Sexiest in the World" by FHM in Asia 2006.
- Leo Award nomination in 2009 for "Dim Sum Funeral" - Best performance by a leading actress in a feature film.
- Leo Award nomination in 2008 for jPod - Best performance by a supporting actress in a dramatic series.
- Leo Award nomination in 2007 for Dragon Boys - Best performance by a leading actress in a dramatic series.
- Gemini Award nomination in 2007 for Dragon Boys - Best performance by a leading actress in a dramatic series.
- Leo Award nomination in 2006 for Everything's Gone Green - Best performance by a leading actress in a feature film.

== Filmography ==
=== Film ===
Film
Year	Title	Role	Notes
2002	Guru Wayne	Production Assistant	Credited as Stephanie Song
2003	The Long Lunch	Gracie	
2004	Rice Rhapsody	Jennifer	Original title: Hainan ji fan Also known as: Hainan Chicken Rice
2006	Everything's Gone Green	Ming Yu	
2007	War	Diane Lone	
2008	Dim Sum Funeral	Meimei	
2008	Waiting in Beijing	Judy	Credited as Li Ching Song
2009	The Thaw	Ling Chen	
2010	Paradox	Lenore	
2010	Stained	Chloe	
2012	Maximum Conviction	Samantha	
2017	Outsiders	Renee	
2018	Affection	Laina	Short film
2021	Mixtape	Ellen's mother	

=== Television ===
Television
Year	Title	Role	Notes
2001	The Secret Life of Us	Loretta	2 episodes
2002	Heartlanders	Rachel Kang	
2002–2003	First Touch	Michelle	2 episodes
2003	The Singapore Short Story Project		Mini-series
2004	Love Poetry	Jane	TV movie
2004–2005	Achar!	Stephanie Chang / Stephanie Chang-Chabria	11 episodes
2006	Godiva's	Jane	
2007	Crossroads: A Story of Forgiveness	Kim	TV movie
2007	Dragon Boys	Chavy Pahn	2 episodes
2008	jPod	Brianna "Bree" Jyang	13 episodes
2009	The Listener	Kim	Season 1 episode 6: "Foggy Notion"
2009	Smallville	Victoria Sinclair / Roulette	Season 9, episode 5: "Roulette"
2011	Endgame	Jia Jyang	Episode 7: "Gorillas in our Midst"
2011	Befriend and Betray	Corporal Justine Yuen	TV movie
2015-2018	Blood and Water	Detective Josephine Bradley	24 episodes Producer - 8 episodes
2019	The Twilight Zone	Olivia	Season 1, episode 7: "Not All Men"
2020	Supergirl	VR Supergirl	Season 5, episode 16: "Alex in Wonderland"
2021	Family Law	Marlee Liu-Hartford	Season 1, episode 3: "Addicted to Love"
2022	A Million Little Things	Dr. Jacobs	Season 4, episode 15: "Fingers Crossed"

=== Video games ===
Video games
Year	Title	Role	Notes
2012	Sleeping Dogs	Sandra	
