= By My Side (TV series) =

- 不凡的爱
- Genre: Kinship, Drama
- Written by: Ng Kah Huay 黄佳华
- Starring: Chen Hanwei; Zoe Tay; Elvin Ng; Rui En
- Opening theme: 我的家 by Joi Chua
- Ending theme: 慢舞 by Rui En
- Country of origin: Singapore
- Original language: Chinese
- No. of episodes: 20

Production
- Producer: 李宁强、赖丽婷
- Running time: approx. 45 minutes

Original release
- Network: MediaCorp TV Channel 8
- Release: 28 October – 24 November 2008

Related
- Crime Busters x 2; The Little Nyonya

By My Side (Chinese: 不凡的爱) is a Singaporean Chinese drama which was telecasted on Singapore's free-to-air channel, MediaCorp Channel 8. It made its debut on 28 October 2008 and ended on 24 November 2008. This drama serial consists of 20 episodes, and was screened on every weekday night at 9:00 pm.

The drama bears the same English name as another 30-episode SBC drama which debuted on 1 May 1990 (Chinese: 逆风天使), and was screened on weekdays at 9.30pm, but both dramas are not related in any way.

== Plot ==
The series is about AIDS patients and the social stigma they suffer, hence the red ribbon shown on the title sequence.

Chen Bufan's family of 5 [wife (Xinya), daughter (Tiantian), and his parents-in-law] live in a 4-room HDB flat. Happy-go-lucky by nature, Bufan is a family-man who works as a section supervisor in a supermarket. Xinya is a tutor. Ever since his parents passed on, Bufan has shouldered the responsibility of caring for his younger brother, Buqun, who is assertive to the point of being annoying.

=== Bufan fishing ===
A man with no unsavoury habits, Bufan's biggest pastime is fishing which he does every weekend in the company of friends like Ma Shiyou (nicknamed Black Horse), Gao Liguo (nicknamed Grey Hound), and Bai Maolin (nicknamed White Fur). They usually go angling in the open seas or by the beach and would give the fish away. Of the lot, Black Horse is a lecher, Grey Hound had been unsuccessful in many match-making sessions and doesn’t dare to express his feelings for Xiulan (his colleague) even though he is enamoured with her, and the effeminate White Fur is uninterested in women. They usually tease Bufan for being the most “normal” one psychologically.

Black Horse usually skips to brothels and nightclubs on the pretext of fishing, leaving Bufan and the rest to cover his tracks in front of his wife. Their advice to him (to not philander) fall on deaf ears as he reckons that he would never contract venereal diseases. He even jeers at Bufan's monogamous and “boring” lifestyle, which the latter laughs off.

=== Family life ===
Bufan and Xinya are high-school sweethearts. Ever since having Tiantian, Xinya has resigned from her job as a primary school teacher to become a tutor, citing health reasons. The youngest daughter of her family, she is highly dependent, and is reliant on Bufan. Xinya is feeble-minded and would consult Bufan even for disagreements between her parents and sister-in-law, adding to his burden. This is why Bufan sometimes jokingly questions how she can survive, if he should pass on.

Bufan dotes on his only child most, as he loves children by nature. Though immensely disappointed at Xinya's refusal to bear him another child following childbirth trauma from delivering Tiantian, he hides his emotions well. He respects Xinya's aversion of sex, and it is Xinya's own mother who constantly reminds her not to neglect her husband's physiological needs. Her heart is set at ease by her husband's assurance that he is not horny, as Black Horse is.

The couple adore their daughter, Tiantian, a tomboyish girl who dresses like a little boy, acts like one (being constantly engaged in ball games with the other kids in the neighbourhood), and is the unofficial leader of the group. She has a habit of confiding in her little diary, aspires to go to the Sports School and wants to be a professional sportswoman when she grows up. She has seen movies like Kungfu Soccer and Kung Fu Dunk umpteen times, and in her attempt to copy the moves, always gets herself injured. This gives Xinya a headache but to Bufan, it is proof of Tiantian's athletic talent and he decides to groom her in this direction.

=== Parents ===
Xinya's parents (Lin Cunxiao and Wang Qiuyue) can’t get along with their daughter-in-law even with Bufan and Xinya's intervention. As such, Bufan puts his in-laws up at his place. Cunxiao has been popular with women since youth and helps them whenever they’re in need (earning him the moniker “Peach Blossom Xiao”, loosely translated as Xiao the Flirt). Many of the women he knows are involved in vices and the flesh trade. He sticks by the principle of “flirting without straying” though no one he never involved with any of them. He wife always remarks that she wouldn’t be surprised to see his illegitimate children turning up at his funeral, putting him in a spot. And on the pretext of helping his vice-involved friends, he brings Bufan to nightclubs and bars, often causing the latter much embarrassment. In reality, he is testing his son-in-law and through such instances, he gathers that Bufan is not steadfast and would stray if given the opportunity. Xinya merely smiles at his word of caution.

=== Weekend fishing ===
It's another weekend and the 4 friends arrange to go fishing together again, Grey Hound and White Fur miss the appointment at last minute, and Black Horse comes late with the young and ravishing Xiao Hong by his side. Initially minding his own business, Bufan is irked by the duo's open flirtation that he wants to tell them off. At this moment, Black Horse's wife arrives with her friends and they proceed to beat Black Horse and Xiao Hong up before dragging the straying husband home. Bufan is about to leave for home when he sees the injured Xiao Hong staggering. Feeling sorry, he gives her a ride.

Along the way, Xiao Hong shares her sob story about being forced into prostitution by circumstances, eliciting Bufan's sympathy. The shrewd Xiao Hong is aware that Bufan, who rarely visits nightclubs and brothers, cannot resist temptation and proceeds to seduce him. Bufan almost succumbs but for the timely recollection of his first experience with a prostitute many years ago...

It turns out that years back, Bufan had a one-night stand with a local whom he later discovered, was a prostitute. His disgust at the realisation, coupled with guilt (towards his wife), makes him swear to himself that it won’t happen again. He has refrained from opening himself to temptation through the years and had kept this secret hidden. This chance encounter with Xiao Hong rekindles a lust within him and he can’t seem to erase the urge, which overwhelms his mind. The more guilty he feels towards Xinya, the more deprived he becomes and this lust nearly overcomes his senses and logic. Bufan's efforts in keeping his carnality in control are thwarted by Xiao Hong, who dishes herself up to him. Her quick thinking in posing herself off as his Marketing colleague saves the two of them from being exposures when Xinya sees her one day. Angered, he confronts her only to be blackmailed when she shows him some compromising pictures of both of them, which she wants him to redeem with money.

Cunxiao quietly informs Xinya that his female friend had seen Bufan at Geylang, but she doesn’t believe it. Bufan becomes increasingly emaciated and he attributes it to stress. He wills himself to stop his wandering mind and stops going for the fishing trips. He even plans to take Xinya and Tiantian for a holiday. Unfortunately before this trip materialises, he suspects that he has contracted aids after listening to a CDC talk, and is tested positive. The HIV strains have lain dormant in him for years and its source – the sole fling he ever had abroad.

The report shocks him, and he shuts out everything the doctor says afterwards. Dazed, he wanders aimlessly until Tiantian finds her father in the streets, drenched by the rain. She leads her Dad home and dries him to keep him warm. She is appalled to find tears in his eyes.

=== Bufan's illness ===
Bufan falls even more seriously ill, running a fever and coughing incessantly. He locks himself in the room, becomes queer, and isolates himself. He even chases his most beloved Tiantian out. He refuses Xinya's suggestion about seeing a doctor. Qiuyue thinks he's possessed and suggests seeking help from a temple medium. No one knows the fear within him. He's petrified about possibly infecting Xinya and Tiantian and contemplates seeking CDC's help but is incapacitated by his apprehensiveness. He gets to know Zhang Yuhang, a social-service volunteer who encourages him to come clean with his wife so he can seek her forgiveness and send his family for HIV tests too. After much emotional struggle, he still fails to pluck up his courage.

Hesitant, apprehensive and unable to face up with the disease, the despondent Bufan can only confide incessantly in Yuhang. He tries to avoid facing up with reality and when Xinya tries to get intimate with him, he escapes. Xinya starts to wonder if her mother had been right about his infidelity, which leaves him speechless. Thinking that he had indeed been unfaithful, the aggrieved Xinya presses him for an absolute answer, which Bufan can’t provide. This casts a shadow over their marriage.

The youthful and pretty Yuhang is a dynamic girl bursting with life and passion. She encourages Bufan to face up to reality instead of wallowing in self-pity and becoming angst-ridden. Bufan retorts that he had strayed but once whereas his friend is a frequent philanderer. The heavens are unfair to stricken him with this illness.

=== Conflict ===
Bufan's accusation that Yuhang doesn’t know how he feels is unfounded as being an aids sufferer herself, Yuhang can empathise with him. In fact, she is even more impeccant victim, having contracted it from her only boyfriend, who had been cheating on her. Embittered, she had confided him her closest friends only to be distanced by them because they are afraid of contact with her. Infuriated further, she tells her relatives and friends of her condition (plus joined organisation) in a futile attempt to challenge society. Sadly, she receives the same treatment. Ascertaining society's rejection of aids patients, she converts her anger into motivation and channels her energy into helping the unfortunate sufferers. Through helping others, she sees resilience of the human spirit and the value of genuine love that survives adversity.

Her boyfriend died of aids, having despaired and become morose because of the disease. Yuhang, on the contrary, becomes more enthusiastic about living. She tells Bufan that aids is not a terminal illness and can be kept under control with the right medication, further encouraging him to come clean with his family and seek their understanding and support. Bufan procrastinates, however.

Bufan becomes sickly and Xinya, egged on by Qiuyue, tries to be intimate with him to no avail. Buqun believes that his brother has succumbed to a moment's folly and looks Yuhang up to urge her not to break his brother's family up. He realises Yuhang is his ex-classmate. Yuhang is at a lost for words and can only tactfully turn him away. This deepens Buqun's misunderstanding.

Little Tiantian overhears her mum mentioning divorce and innocently looks Yuhang up to ask her to back off. She injures herself and is rushed to the hospital by Yuhang. Bufan tells the doctor the truth about his condition and upon checking Tiantian, is relieved that she is HIV negative.

During a dispute with a prostitute, Bufan angrily reveals that he has AIDS, having contracted it from such women. When Xinya overhears, Bufan confirms to Xinya about his condition and his worry that she might have contracted the disease as well. Xinya is stunned and her world crumbles. She cannot accept the horrifying fact and goes for a HIV check at Bufan's insistence. Thankfully, she is HIV negative, but the relief does nothing to alleviate the bitterness of her husband's betrayal.

=== Family atmosphere ===
Tiantian feels that her Daddy and Mummy have changed; in fact, the atmosphere at home has changed. Mummy cries everyday and Daddy is perpetually sitting around in a daze. They don’t talk to each other and they don’t go to work anymore. What vexes Tiantian more is the fact that she is banned from venturing out and prohibited from playing ball with her friends. Tiantian protests and sneaks out only to be caught and brought back by her Mum. Faced with Tiantian's tantrums, Xinya can only cuddle her as tears flowed freely. That night, Tiantian again hears the term “divorce”. Bufan announces his intention. Alarmed, Cunxiao and Qiuyue berate Bufan for his heartlessness and infidelity and Buqun righteously hits Bufan for Xinya. Unable to face his family, Bufan flees.

Drifting in the streets, Bufan is overwhelmed by thoughts of suicide and walks into the path of a car, only to be saved by Xinya who arrives in the nick of time. Bufan repents. Too ashamed to face his family, he implores Xinya to leave him to his devices. Xinya is struck speechless. Reminiscing the happier times and Bufan's role as a loving husband, doting father and dutiful son-in-law, Xinya relents and embraces Bufan as the two bawl their hearts out.

Risking her parents’ understanding, Xinya sends them back to her brother's home. This incurs Cunxiao's suspicion and he checks with Bufan's 3 angling friends to no avail. Black Horse recalls Bufan's encounter and deduces that the latter has contracted aids. He tries to sound the latter out and seeing Bufan's secretiveness, starts to avoid him.

Bufan tells his boss, Liang, the truth in the hope that the latter will understand and retain him (based on their relationship and knowledge about how aids is being passed), but worried about the supermarket's business and the employees’ safety, Liang wants Bufan to resign on his own accord.

=== Isolated ===
Distanced by his friends, deserted by his boss and in dire straits, Bufan loses the will to live. The dependent Xinya loses direction and is uncertain about how she can face the future.

Tiantian details this in her diary: “Daddy and Mummy don’t talk to each other at all. The silence at home is deafening and scary. I want so much to go to out and have a game of soccer with Xiaobin and the rest. It’s been such a long time since I last went to the court. I want to just roll on the ground. But looking at Mum’s expression of misery, I just can’t bring myself to do it. I wanted to laugh when watching Kungfu Soccer this evening, but looking at Dad and Mum, I daren’t."

Buqun finds himself irresistibly attracted to Yuhang, and falls head over heels for her. Yuhang is neither friendly nor aloof to him, but as an aids sufferer, doesn’t wish to be romantically involved. She refrains from seeing him.

A chance encounter at a Red Ribbon volunteer activity lets Buqun see Yuhang's selflessness in caring for the aids patients and is deeply moved. He enthusiastically participates in social work to get closer to Yuhang. Strangely, Yuhang's inexhaustible warmth and passion towards the aids patients aren’t extended to him. And she keeps an arm's length where he's concerned. Buqun increasingly feels that Yuhang harbours a secret and the more he wants to unravel it, the further she runs away.

Through ex-classmates, all Buqun gathers is that Yuhang had a boyfriend with whom she shared a deep and intimate relationship, and that he died 2 years back. Buqun wishfully thinks that Yuhang is not willing to accept a new love as she is emotionally hurt by her boyfriend's death, but this doesn’t explain Yuhang's affinity towards Bufan. Unable to contain his perplexity, he questions Yuhang only to incur her wrath. Buqun also questions Bufan about this relationship with Yuhang, which the latter vehemently denies. But Bufan does give Buqun an ambiguous response, that he is in touch with Yuhang because a friend has aids. Buqun believes in what Bufan says, and the latter encourages the former to pursue Yuhang as she's a nice girl.

=== Courtship ===
The passionate Buqun relentlessly and overwhelmingly courts Yuhang, almost throwing her off balance. She is moved, but rationally tells herself that she must observe professional ethics. Besides, she is in no position to fall in love again. She directly and resolutely rejects Buqun's advances, but he is not disheartened as he believes that he will touch her heart one day.

A 15-year-old boy named Sky, having overheard bits of Xinya and Tiantian's conversation, mistakenly concludes that Tiantian is an aids carrier. Self-righteous, he begins to spread this “information”, aggravating the family's already stressful condition. But why would he be so nosey?

As it turns out, Sky is also HIV positive, having contracted the disease from his mother even before he was born (both parents have aids). His parents kept the truth of his condition from him, passing the mandatory medication off as supplements for his weak health. He learns about his condition and resents his parents for keeping the truth from him and obstinately believes that Tiantian's parents are as selfish as his own. This is why he embarks on a mission to expose the couple's condition to the schools.

Ever since he came to know about Bufan's condition, Black Horse no longer tempts fate nor pushes his luck, ceasing his visits to the brothels. Pestered by an old flame at a coffeeshop, he blurts Bufan's condition out and is overheard by Cunxiao, who presses Black Horse for the truth. Thus Bufan's aids secret becomes open.

=== Neighbours ===
Already on the brink of desperation, Bufan and Xinya are dealt another blow as the entire estate is abuzz with information about his condition. In an instance, people avoid them like plague, neighbours are afraid to pass their doorstep and the neighbourhood merchants don’t dare to sell things to the family. Even at food stalls, cutlery they’d used would be disposed of immediately. This embarrasses the couple, and plunges them further down the abyss of despair. The most innocent victim in this saga is Tiantian, who gets isolated by the other children.

Saddened, Tiantian once again confides in her diary. “I saw Xiaobin and his mum at the lift when I went to buy breakfast with Mummy today. When they saw us, they scampered off as if they’d just been frightened by ghosts. Strange, but he didn’t seem to run that fast when we were racing against each other in the past. When I called him, his mummy refused to let me speak to Xiaobin and wants me to stay away from him in future. Why are they so scared of me? I wanted to ask Daddy, but I don’t dare to. Daddy is no longer the father I knew him to be in the past...

The one hardest hit by this reality is Buqun and he pieces up the sequence of events to finally understand what is going on, that everything had been sparked by Bufan's illness. He reaches out to Bufan's family in times of tribulation, hoping to lift them out of the abyss but inexperienced, he botches things up instead. He approaches Yuhang for help in dealing with the situation and the two get closer because of it. Regardless, Yuhang remains cold to Buqun and he attempts to force her to leave the past behind only to be successful in antagonising her further. Dejected, he goes abroad for a short trip and without him around, Yuhang starts to miss him. She realises that she has unknowingly fallen for him. This is against both her professional and personal principles, however, and her dormant heart is once again disturbed.

Cunxiao and Qiuyue come to know that Bufan's aids-strain was contracted from a prostitute and berate him for bringing this misfortune upon the family. Through a period of reflection, Xinya has come to accept her lot in life and is prepared to face the music with Bufan. Remembering Bufan's virtues, Cunxiao and Qiuyue forgive him as well. Xinping and wife, on the other hand, feel strongly against Bufan and make Cunxiao and Qiuyue sterilise themselves every time they visit Xinya, else they would be stopped from contacting their grandchildren. Cunxiao and Qiuyue are bemused and feel more acutely, the pressures and ostracism that Bufan and Xinya are facing. Incensed by Xinping's demands that he severs all ties with Xinya, Cunxiao leaves in a fit of anger and chooses to live with Bufan, to weather the storm together with them.

=== Medical bills ===
Bufan's monthly medical bill causes a huge financial strain on the family, and Xinya starts to shoulder the burden of providing for everyone. She shuttles more diligently between the students’ homes and takes up more tuition jobs. At the same time, she has to carefully conceal her husband's condition so as not to lose the jobs and incur the parents’ wrath.

Bufan finally secures a job in a far-away factory, as a night-shift security guard. This is a relief to him as he can avoid having to face his wife and daughter everyday, which has served only to intensify his guilt. At the same time, he can avoid coming into contact with other people. He isolates himself, sleeping in the factory by day and patrols the grounds at night. Xinya learns of his thinking and tries to dissuade him from doing this, but her advice falls on deaf ears.

Bufan wakes up one midnight to find his wife and daughter snuggled in his arms. Xinya tells him that as a family, they either die or live on bravely together. Aids is not a terminal illness and it can be kept in control by drugs. Xinya has never exuded such courage and resilience. Touched, Bufan tearfully resolves not to escape anymore. He returns to Xinya's side.

=== Daughter ===
At this point, the couple realise that their vivacious and exuberant little girl has changed too. Tiantian has become sullen and antagonistic. Her diaries are filled with unanswered questions, lamentation and indignance. At her swimming lessons, one of the activities where the little girl used to be happiest, Tiantian consciously distances herself from the other students for fear of harming them. Her diary entries are increasingly short until at last, some forcefully written question marks (“???”) remain.

At around the same time too, Xinya becomes acquainted with her student's father, Andy, who intentionally comes into Bufan and Xinya's lives. What is Andy's motive and how will he affect Bufan and Xinya's marriage? A drained Xinya and an increasingly withdrawn Tiantian... How can the depressed Bufan face up with these challenges? Would the bond between members of the family become stronger through adversity or would the ties not stand the test? Will they overcome all obstacles? Will Yuhang ever tell Buqun the truth about her condition? Will Buqun be able to accept this fact?

== Cast ==
=== Main ===
- Chen Hanwei as Chen Bufan 陈不凡
- Zoe Tay as Lin Xinya 林欣雅
- Elvin Ng as Chen Buqun 陈不群
- Rui En as Zhang Yuhang 张宇航
- Vina Lim as Tiantian

=== Supporting ===
- Terence Cao as 子新/子健 Zi Xin/Zi Jian
- Zhu Houren as 林存孝 Lin Chun Xiao
- Zhu Yu Yue 朱玉叶 as 王秋月 Wang Qiu Ye
- Ye Shi Pin 叶世品 as 马世友(黑马) Black Horse
- Brandon Wong as 高立国(灰狗) Grey Dog
- Ong Ai Leng as Cecelia
- Chen Tianwen as Andy

== See also ==
- List of programmes broadcast by Mediacorp Channel 8
