= Everything's Gone Green (film) =

2006 film by Paul Fox

- Promotional poster for Everything's Gone Green
- Directed by: Paul Fox
- Written by: Douglas Coupland
- Produced by: Henrik Meyer, Chris Nanos & Elizabeth Yake
- Starring: Paulo Costanzo; Steph Song; JR Bourne
- Cinematography: David Frazee
- Edited by: Gareth C. Scales
- Distributed by: Equinoxe Films
- Release dates: September 10, 2006 (Toronto International Film Festival); April 20, 2007 (Canada)
- Country: Canada
- Language: English

Everything's Gone Green is a 2006 Canadian independent comedy film directed by Paul Fox and written by Douglas Coupland. It was produced by Elizabeth Yake, True West Films and Chris Nanos, Radke Films. Originally acquired for distribution in Canada by ThinkFilm, with Shoreline Entertainment handling international sales, Equinoxe Films later acquired Canadian distribution rights after ThinkFilm's sale to Capitol Films led to the closure of its Canadian distribution services. The film won the award for Best Canadian Feature Film at the 2006 Vancouver International Film Festival.

== Plot ==
Ryan, a good-natured slacker in his twenties, is dumped by his girlfriend and kicked out of their apartment, and, on arriving late to work, is suspended (pending psychological tests) from his job at an anonymous IT corporation. On receiving a phone call from his family saying they have won the jackpot of 4.3 million dollars on the BC lottery, he trashes his office space, and resigns. Unfortunately, when he calls the lottery "Win Line" he discovers they haven't actually won anything. By happy accident, Ryan is offered a job with the lottery bureau interviewing and photographing lottery winners. En route to the job interview he stops to see a beached whale and meets Ming, a set designer in a relationship with golf-course designer and scam artist Bryce.

Ryan is enticed by Bryce into participating in a lucrative money-laundering scheme involving new lottery winners, and after the euphoria of new-found wealth wears off, is forced to choose between working with Bryce and winning over an increasingly sceptical Ming. Additional complications arise when Ryan discovers that his parents are operating a marijuana grow-op in the family basement, and when he re-visits lottery winners to discover that they are often worse off than they were before winning.

== Cast ==
- Paulo Costanzo ... as Ryan
- Steph Song ... as Ming Yu
- JR Bourne ... as Bryce
- Aidan Devine ... as Alan
- Susan Hogan ... as Mom
- Tom Butler ... as Dad
- Peter Kelamis ... as Kevin
- Gordon Michael Woolvett ... as Spike
- Katharine Isabelle ... as Heather
- Tara Wilson ... as Marcia
- Chiu-Lin Tam ... as Granny
- Camyar Chai ... as Surjinder
- Jennifer Kitchen ... as Linda
- Alexus Dumont ... as Wendy
- Don Thompson ... as Mr. Connor
- Chang Tseng ... as Mr. Ho
- Mark Gibbon ... as Rory
- Melanie Blackwell ... as Receptionist
- Kit Koon ... as Ms. Hamada
- Steven Cree Molison ... as Biker

== Soundtrack ==
A soundtrack album was released on CD by Lakeshore Records in 2007, titled Everything's Gone Green: Original Motion Picture Soundtrack. The Meligrove Band appeared on MTV Live to promote its release.

=== Songs ===
1. No Satisfaction - Black Mountain
2. Hangover Days - Jason Collett
3. Birdsong - The Golden Dogs
4. The CN Tower Belongs to the Dead - Final Fantasy
5. Fire - Jason Collett
6. Everything You've Done Wrong - Sloan
7. Little Saddy - Andre Ethier
8. Break You - Hawaii
9. Violet Light - Raised by Swans
10. Skunks - Caribou
11. 97 and 02 - Circlesquare
12. I Gotta Plan (for Saturday Night) - The Deadly Snakes
13. Monkey Mask - The Meligrove Band
14. Small Town Murder Scene - The Fembots
