= The Amazing Race Canada 10 =

Season of television series

- Season 10
- Presented by: Jon Montgomery
- No. of days: 23
- No. of teams: 11
- Winners: Taylor McPherson & Katie Mulkay
- No. of legs: 10
- Distance traveled: 16,000 km (9,900 mi)
- No. of episodes: 10

Release
- Original network: CTV
- Original release: July 2 – September 10, 2024

Additional information
- Filming dates: April 23 – May 15, 2024

Series chronology
- ← Previous; Season 9 Next → Season 11

The Amazing Race Canada 10 is the tenth season of The Amazing Race Canada, a Canadian reality competition show based on the American series The Amazing Race. Hosted by Jon Montgomery, it featured eleven teams of two, each with a pre-existing relationship, in a race across Canada. The grand prize included a CA$250,000 cash payout, a trip for two around the world courtesy of Expedia, and two 2024 Chevrolet Equinox EV RS vehicles. This season visited seven provinces and travelled over 16,000 kilometres (9,900 mi) during ten legs. Starting in Niagara Falls, Ontario, racers travelled through Ontario, British Columbia, Saskatchewan, Manitoba, Quebec, New Brunswick, and Alberta before finishing in Edmonton. New twists introduced in this season include the Blind U-Turn Vote and the Switchback, a recreation of a notable task from a previous season. The season premiered on CTV on July 2, 2024, and concluded on September 10, 2024.

Best friends Taylor McPherson and Katie Mulkay were the winners of this season, making them the second all-female team to win the Canadian version of the program, while best friends Colin Rose and Matt Roberts were the runners-up, best friends and former baseball players Michael Crouse and Tyson Gillies finished in third place, and twin sisters Lauren and Nicole Peters finished in fourth place.

== Production ==
=== Development and filming ===
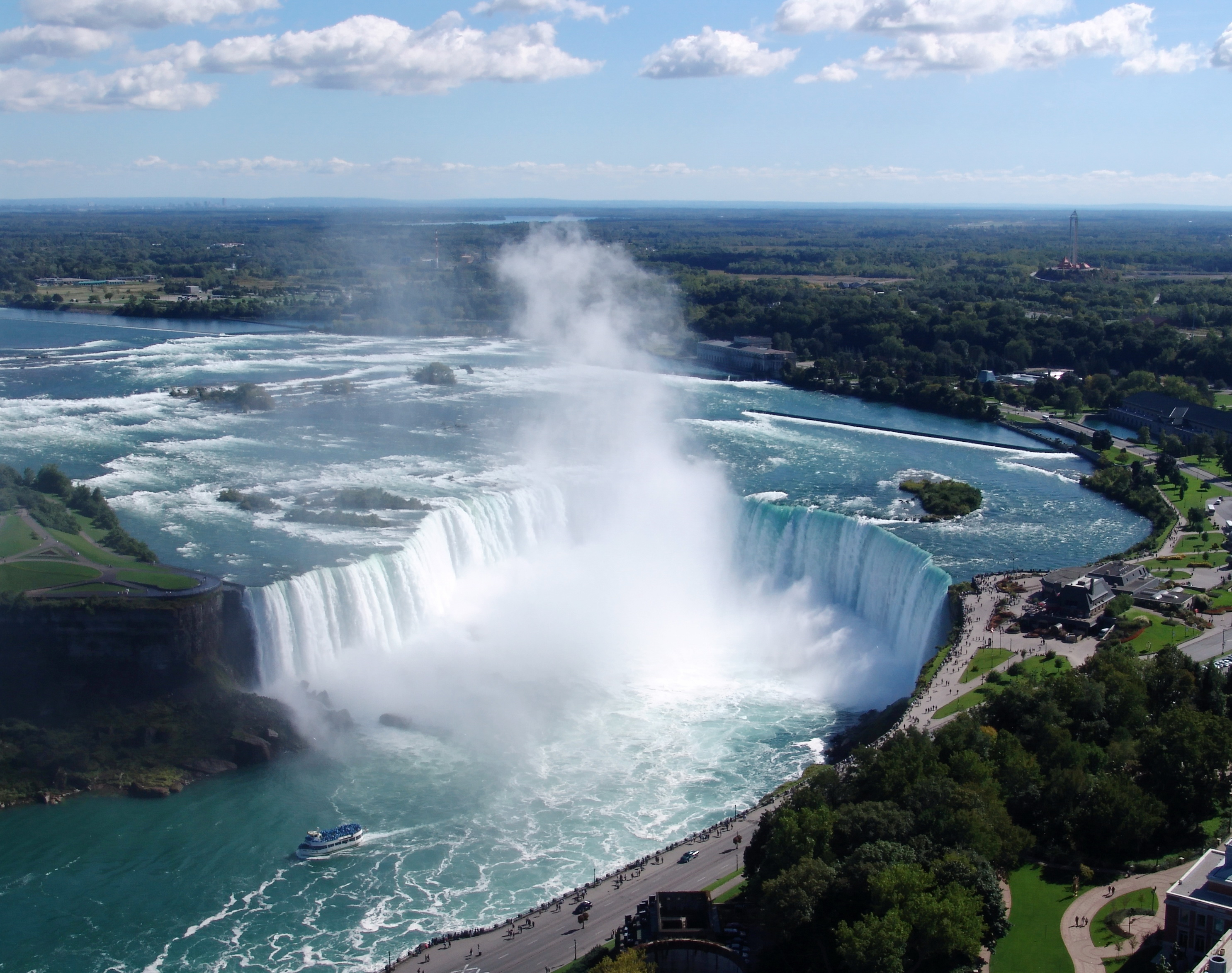
For its milestone tenth season, The Amazing Race Canada returned to Oakes Garden Theatre, overlooking the Horseshoe Falls section of Niagara Falls.

On September 19, 2023, CTV announced that the show was renewed for a tenth season prior to the finale of the ninth season.

Filming for this season began on April 23, 2024, in Niagara Falls, Ontario. Teams were spotted in Sunshine Coast, British Columbia, on April 26. On April 28, filming occurred in Richmond, British Columbia. Then, the show was in Penticton and Oliver, British Columbia, from April 28 to 29. On May 2, racers travelled through Regina, Saskatchewan, and Russell, Manitoba. On May 9, a leg was filmed in Shawinigan, Quebec. On May 10, teams encountered Scottish Highland style challenges in Maxville, Ontario. Filming concluded on May 15 in Edmonton, Alberta.

This season saw the first appearance of a U-Turn Vote; a twist previously utilized on the Israeli, Chinese, Australian, Filipino, and American versions of The Amazing Race.

=== Casting ===
Casting for this season opened on October 5, 2023, and closed on December 11.

=== Broadcast ===
On June 6, 2024, CTV announced that this season would premiere on July 2, 2024.

=== Marketing ===
Chevrolet, Expedia, Desjardins Group, and Paramount Pictures, which promoted Transformers One, returned as sponsors. New sponsors included Boost and Kids Help Phone.

== Cast ==
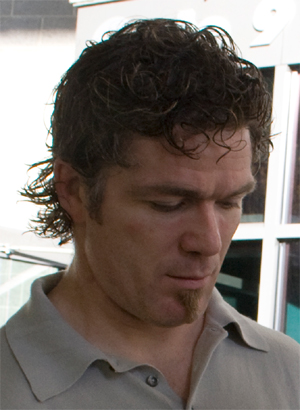
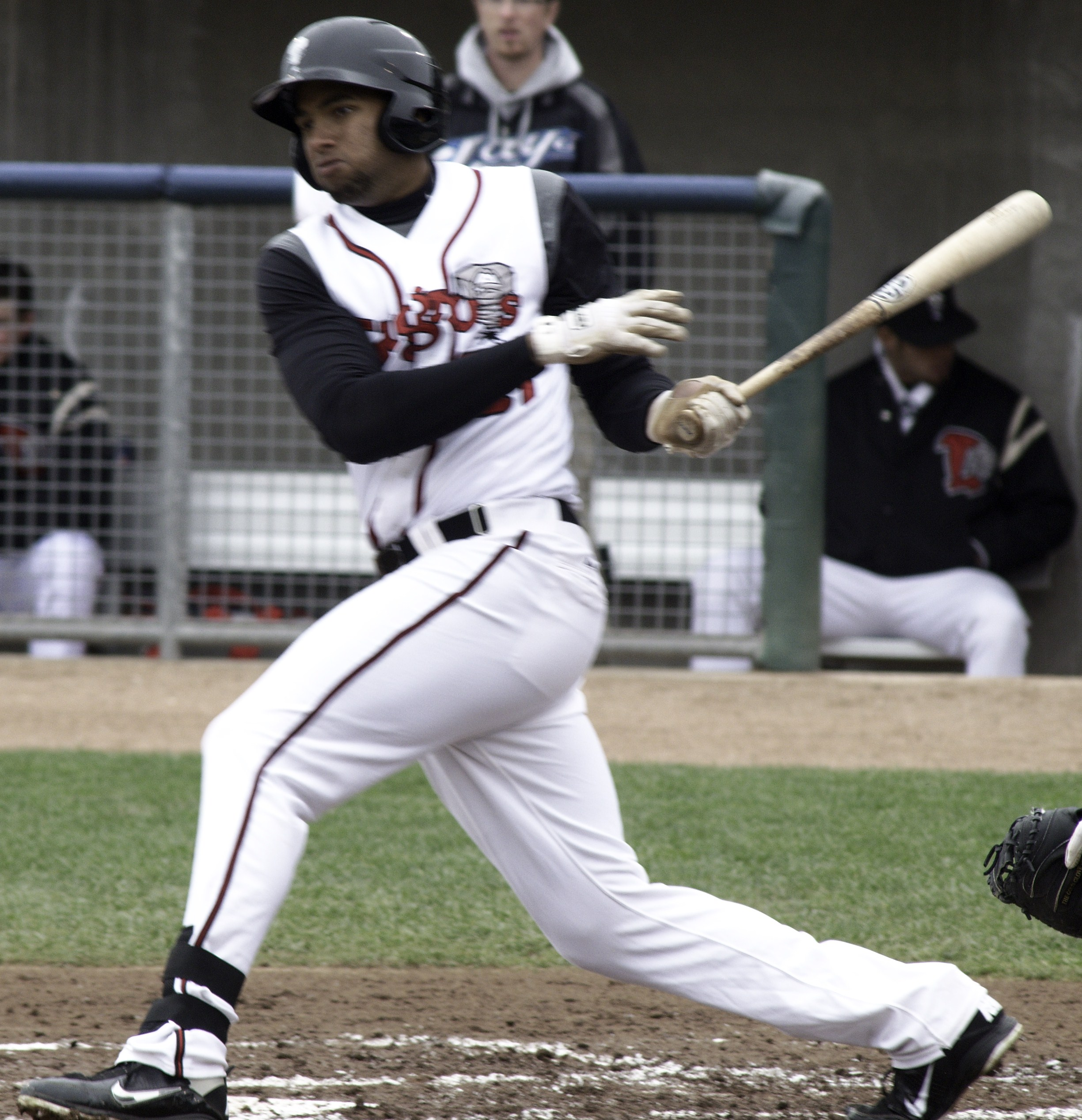
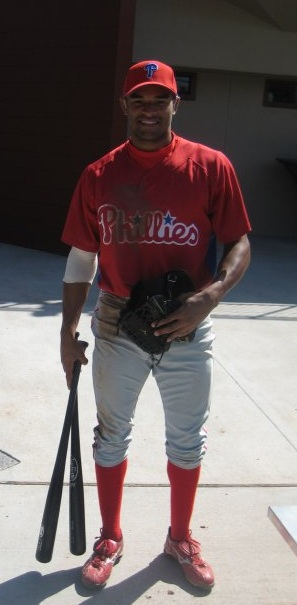
From left to right: Brad May, Michael Crouse, and Tyson Gillies

The cast includes reality TV stars Kevin Martin and Gurleen Maan, former baseball players Michael Crouse and Tyson Gillies, former basketball player Michael Linklater, and former NHL player Brad May.

Contestants	Age	Relationship	Hometown	Status
Eva Amo-Mensah	30	Friends	Toronto, Ontario	Eliminated 1st (in Niagara Falls, Ontario)
Trystenne Burey	27	Friends	Toronto, Ontario	Eliminated 1st (in Niagara Falls, Ontario)
Dorothy Adeneye	29	Married Entrepreneurs	Calgary, Alberta	Eliminated 2nd (in Roberts Creek, British Columbia)
Olus Adeneye	32	Married Entrepreneurs	Calgary, Alberta	Eliminated 2nd (in Roberts Creek, British Columbia)
Connor Carroll	26	Best Friends	Pickering, Ontario	Eliminated 3rd (in Oliver, British Columbia)
John Ferguson	26	Best Friends	Erin, Ontario	Eliminated 3rd (in Oliver, British Columbia)
Brad May	52	Father & Daughter	Toronto, Ontario	Eliminated 4th (in Rural Municipality of Riding Mountain West, Manitoba)
Sam May	24	Father & Daughter	Toronto, Ontario	Eliminated 4th (in Rural Municipality of Riding Mountain West, Manitoba)
Julia Viola	33	Married	Clearview, Ontario	Eliminated 5th (in Guelph, Ontario)
Olivia Curto	33	Married	Clearview, Ontario	Eliminated 5th (in Guelph, Ontario)
Michael Linklater	42	Father & Son	Saskatoon, Saskatchewan	Eliminated 6th (in South Stormont, Ontario)
Amari Linklater	19	Father & Son	Saskatoon, Saskatchewan	Eliminated 6th (in South Stormont, Ontario)
Kevin Martin	31	Dating	Calgary, Alberta	Eliminated 7th (in Miramichi, New Brunswick)
Gurleen Maan	35	Dating	Abbotsford, British Columbia	Eliminated 7th (in Miramichi, New Brunswick)
Lauren Peters	26	Twin Sisters	Mississauga, Ontario	Fourth place
Nicole Peters	26	Twin Sisters	Mississauga, Ontario	Fourth place
Michael Crouse	33	Best Friends	Vancouver, British Columbia	Third place
Tyson Gillies	35	Best Friends	Vancouver, British Columbia	Third place
Colin Rose	33	Best Friends	Mount Pearl, Newfoundland and Labrador	Runners-up
Matt Roberts	31	Best Friends	Mount Pearl, Newfoundland and Labrador	Runners-up
Taylor McPherson	24	Best Friends	Edmonton, Alberta	Winners
Katie Mulkay	24	Best Friends	Edmonton, Alberta	Winners

Future appearances

Sam May competed with Brendan McDougall from season 8 on season 11.

In 2026, John Ferguson appeared on the TLC show Little Singles.

== Results ==
The following teams are listed with their placements in each leg. Placements are listed in finishing order.

- A red placement with a dagger (†) indicates that the team was eliminated.
- An italicized and underlined placement indicates that the team was the last to arrive at a Pit Stop, but there was no rest period at the Pit Stop and all teams were instructed to continue racing.
- A green α indicates that the team found the Assist during the leg.
- A brown ⊂ indicates the team on the receiving end of a U-Turn.
- A purple ε indicates that the team used an Express Pass on that leg to bypass one of their tasks.
- A brown ∈ indicates that the team used the Pass and a brown ∋ indicates the team on the receiving end of the Pass.
- A teal х indicates that the leg featured a Face Off challenge.

Team placement (by leg)
Team	1	2	3 (Note: This leg neither ended at a Pit Stop nor was any team eliminated.)	4	5	6	7х (Note: This leg featured a Face Off challenge.)	8	9х	10
Taylor & Katie	8th	3rd	3rd	4th	3rd	1st∈ (Note: Taylor & Katie chose to use the Pass on Kevin & Gurleen.)	6th (Note: This team arrived last at the Pit Stop, but they were instructed to continue racing.)	1st∈ (Note: Taylor & Katie chose to use the Pass on Kevin & Gurleen.)	2nd	1st
Colin & Matt	5th	4thα (Note: This team used the Assist on this leg.)	1st	7th	7thα	6th	4th	4th	3rd	2nd
Michael & Tyson	9th	1st	6th	1st	4thε (Note: This team used their Express Pass to bypass one of the tasks on this leg.)	4th	5th	5th∋ (Note: Kevin & Gurleen chose to use the Pass on Michael & Tyson.)	4th (Note: Michael & Tyson initially arrived 1st, but were issued a 2-hour penalty for failing to complete the Mi'kmaq language challenge. Three teams checked in during this penalty time, dropping Michael & Tyson to 4th.)	3rd
Lauren & Nicole	2nd	2nd	2ndα	2ndα	2nd	3rd^{∋}_{ε} (Note: Kevin & Gurleen chose to use the Pass on Lauren & Nicole.)	1st	3rd	1st	4th
Kevin & Gurleen	1st	5th (Note: Kevin & Gurleen and Michael & Amari tied for 5th place after both teams stepped on the Pit Stop mat at the same time.)	8th	5th⊂ (Note: In Leg 3, the teams voted for one team to be U-Turned; Kevin & Gurleen received the most votes. They then got to choose one team to U-Turn alongside them. They chose Julia & Olivia.)	5th	5th^{∋}_{∈}	2nd	2nd^{∋}_{∈}	5th†	
Michael & Amari	3rd	5th	4th	6th	6th	2ndε	3rd	6th†		
Julia & Olivia	4th	8th	7th	8th⊂	1st	7th†				
Brad & Sam	6th	7th	5th	3rd	8th†					
Connor & John	7thα	9th	9th	9th†						
Dorothy & Olus	10th	10th†								
Eva & Trystenne	11th†									

== Race summary ==
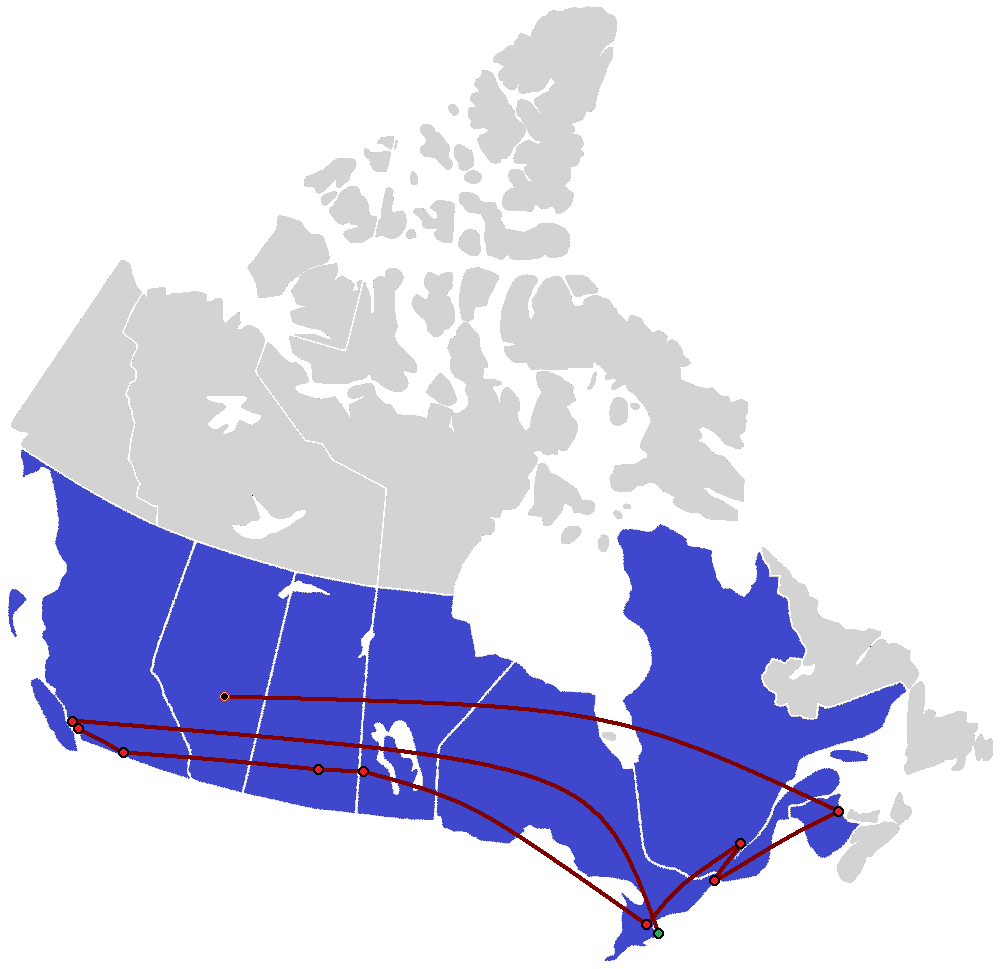
The route map of The Amazing Race Canada 10.

Destinations	Air travel Rail travel Water travel Bus travel Helicopter travel Bicycle travel Gondola travel
Route Markers	Detour Roadblock Face Off Express Pass Assist; U-Turn Pass Switchback Pit Stop

=== Leg 1 (Ontario) ===
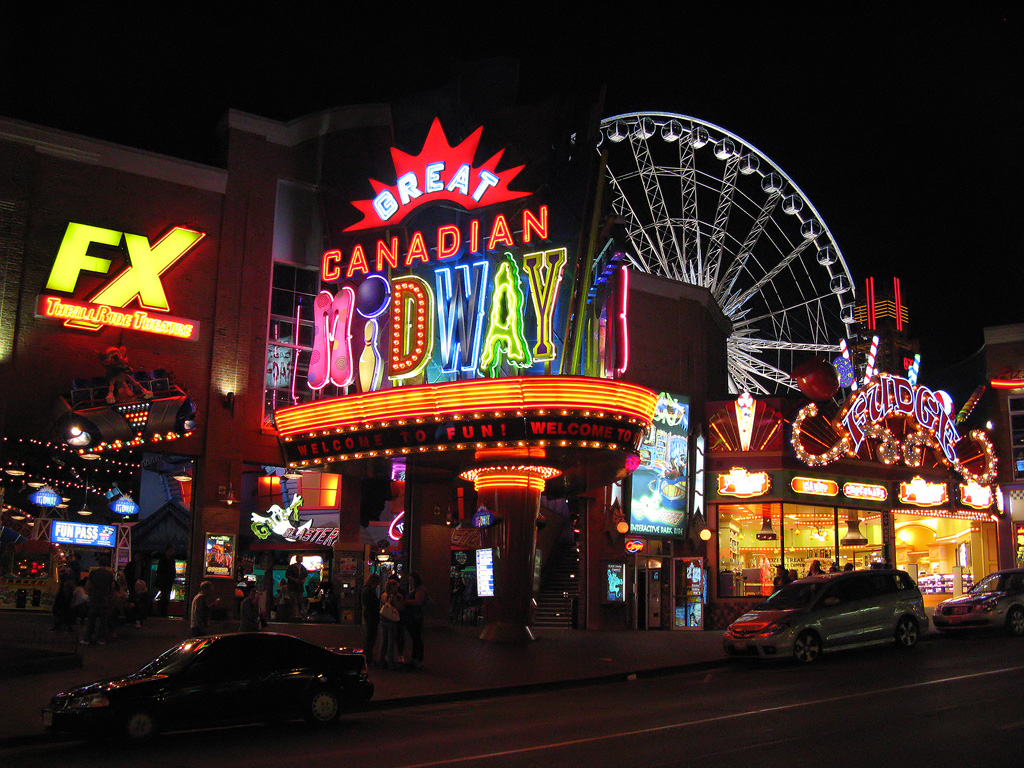
The first Detour of The Amazing Race Canada 10 was located in Clifton Hill in Niagara Falls, Ontario.

- Episode 1: "Back Where It All Started" (July 2, 2024)
- Prize: CA$10,000 and a trip for two to India (awarded to Kevin & Gurleen)
- Eliminated: Eva & Trystenne

Locations

- Niagara Falls, Ontario (Oakes Garden Theatre) (Starting Line)
- Niagara Falls (Table Rock Centre & Journey Behind the Falls)
- Niagara Falls (Clifton Hill – Great Canadian Midway or Niagara SkyWheel)
- Niagara Falls (Nightmares Fear Factory)
- Niagara Falls (Illumination Tower)
- Niagara Falls (Niagara Parks Power Station – The Tunnel)

Episode summary

- Teams set off from Oakes Garden Theatre in Niagara Falls, Ontario, and retrieved their first clue from their bags.
- In this season's first Roadblock, one team member had to rappel 180 feet alongside Horseshoe Falls, retrieve their next clue, and reunite with their partner.
- This season's first Detour was a choice between Game Time and Show Time. In Game Time, teams had to play marked arcade games and win 400 tickets in order to receive their next clue. In Show Time, teams had to memorize a script with facts about Niagara Falls and recite it to a group of tourists in order to receive their next clue.
- After the Detour, teams had to search outside the Nightmares Fear Factory for their next clue. There, teams had to brave the haunted house, memorize a colour combination, travel to the Illumination Tower, and light up Niagara Falls with their colours in order to receive their next clue. The Assist was hidden in one clue, found by Connor & John, and allowed them to skip the colour memorization.
- Teams then had to travel to the Pit Stop: The Tunnel at the Niagara Parks Power Station. Before teams could check in, they had to listen to facts about the power station while descending down an elevator and correctly answer a randomly selected question at the mat.

Additional note

- This leg was The Amazing Race Canada's 100th leg.

=== Leg 2 (Ontario → British Columbia) ===
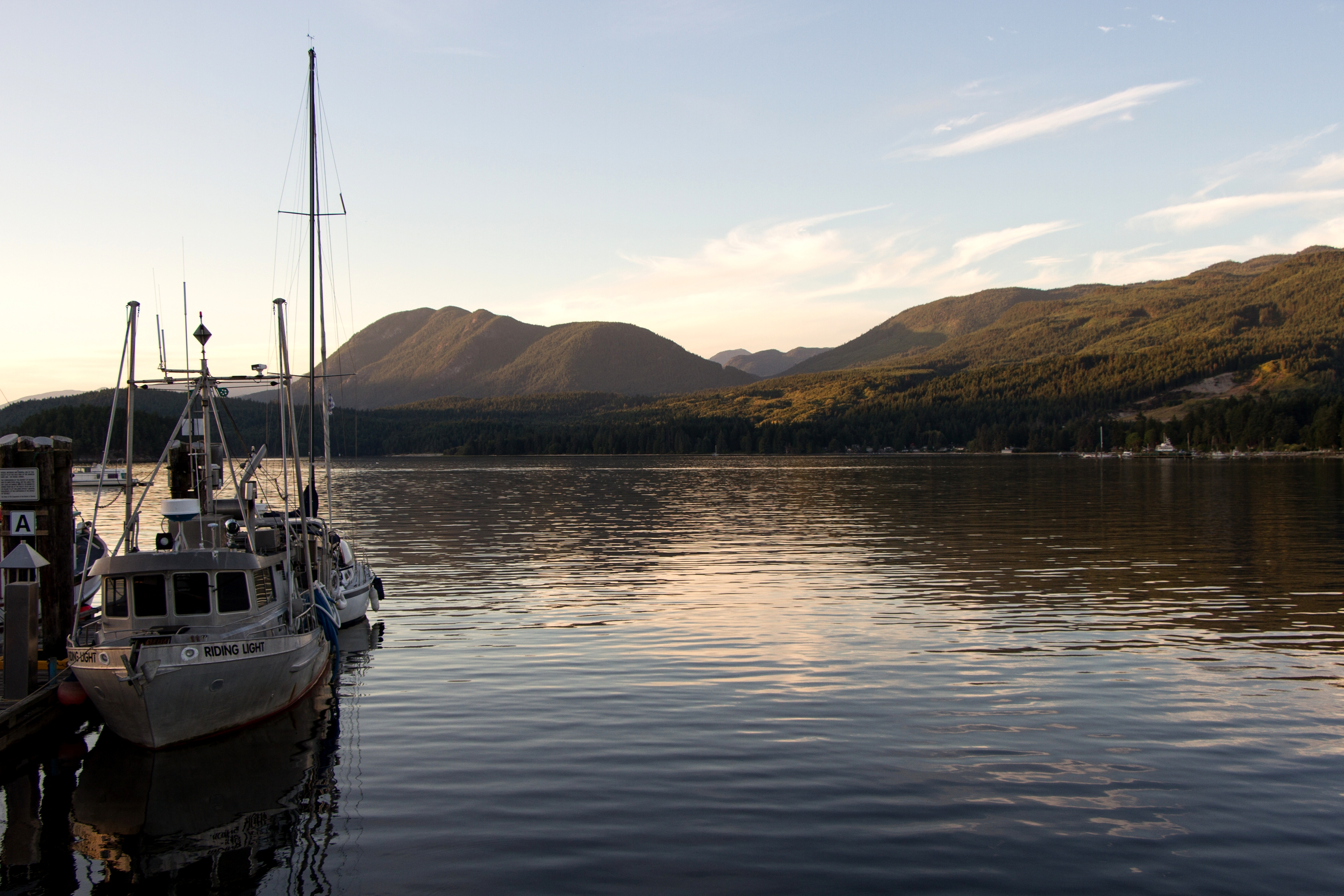
While in Sunshine Coast, British Columbia, teams had to capsize a kayak into the Sechelt Inlet and rescue themselves.

- Episode 2: "Call Me The Olive Man" (July 9, 2024)
- Prize: CA$10,000 and a trip for two to Dubai, United Arab Emirates (awarded to Michael & Tyson)
- Eliminated: Dorothy & Olus

Locations

- Niagara Falls (Niagara Parks Power Station)
- Niagara Falls (Table Rock Centre) → Toronto
- Toronto → Vancouver, British Columbia
- Vancouver (Second Beach)
- Vancouver (Vancouver Harbour Flight Centre – Seair Seaplanes) → Sechelt (Poise Cove Marina)
- Sechelt (Half Moon Kayaks)
- Gibsons (Sunshine Coast Olive Oil Co. or Gibsons Public Market)
- Roberts Creek (Mise-En-Place Equestrian)
- Roberts Creek (Roberts Creek Pier)

Episode summary

- At the start of this leg, teams were instructed to fly to Vancouver, British Columbia.
- Once in Vancouver, teams either had to travel to Seair Seaplanes and sign up for a flight to Sechelt or travel to Second Beach and claim an Express Pass by pulling it from the sea to shore. Michael & Tyson won two, and Michael & Amari won one.
- Once in Sechelt, teams found their next clue on a marked truck. Teams had to drive to Half Moon Kayaks, paddle into the Sechelt Inlet, capsize their kayak, and perform a self rescue in order to receive their next clue.
- This leg's Detour was a choice between Palate Test or Mallet Fest. In Palate Test, teams had to sample ten olive oils and match them to their flavours in order to receive their next clue. In Mallet Fest, teams had to perform a song on a marimba in order to receive their next clue.
- After the Detour, teams had to drive to Mise-En-Place Equestrian in Roberts Creek and find their next clue.
- In this leg's Roadblock, one team member had to perform a dressage course in a specific order from memory on a hobby horse in order to receive their next clue. The Assist was hidden in one clue, found by Colin & Matt, and allowed them to perform a simplfied course.
- After the Roadblock, teams received a photograph of a shíshálh mandala and had to figure out that it was at the Pit Stop: Roberts Creek Pier.

=== Leg 3 (British Columbia) ===
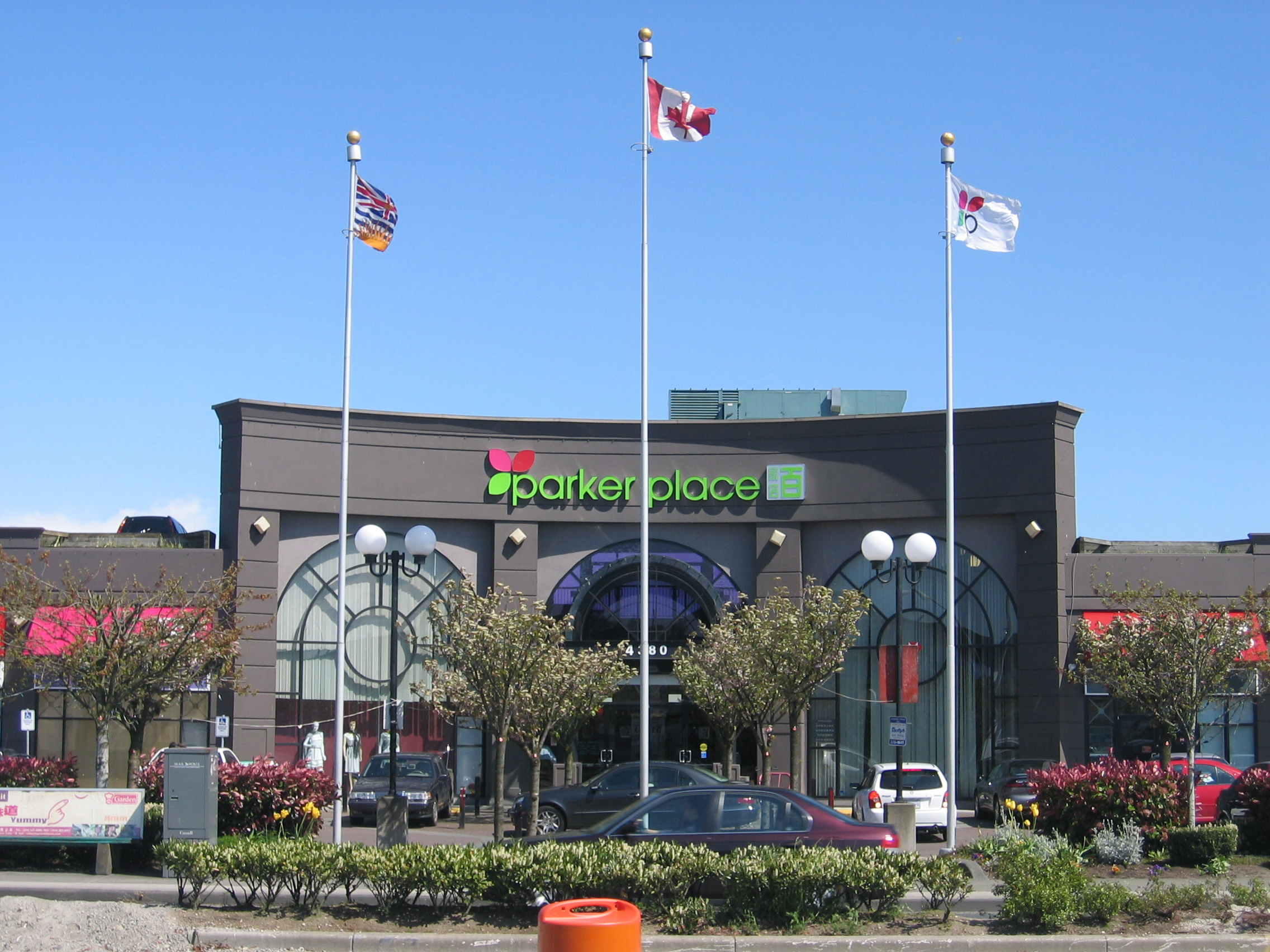
Teams encountered a U-Turn Vote at Parker Place in Richmond, British Columbia.

- Episode 3: "Plot Twist It's a U-Turn Vote" (July 16, 2024)
- Prize: CA$10,000, a trip for two to Madagascar and an Extra Vote to cast in the U-Turn Vote (awarded to Colin & Matt)

Locations

- Sechelt (The Oceanside, a Coast Hotel)
- Sechelt (Salish Soils)
- Langdale (Langdale Terminal) → Horseshoe Bay, West Vancouver
- Vancouver (Granville Island Public Market)
- Richmond (Parker Place)

Episode summary

- At the start of this leg, teams were instructed to drive to Salish Soils in Sechelt. Once there, teams had to blend a specific compost, transport it in wheelbarrows across the compound, and fill it into bags until they fill 160 kilograms of compost in order to receive their next clue.
- Teams then had to travel by ferry to Vancouver and find their next clue at the Granville Island Public Market. There, teams had to purchase six ingredients from the market's vendors and deliver them to six restaurants in surrounding neighbourhoods in order to receive their next clue. The Assist was hidden in one clue, found by Lauren & Nicole, and allowed them to buy and deliver four ingredients.
- From the market, teams had to drive to Parker Place in Richmond, where they had to arrange a set of mahjong tiles in order to receive their next clue sending them to the U-Turn Vote. Teams then had to travel to the Signature main terminal, fly to Penticton, and drive to the SS Sicamous.

Additional note

- Teams encountered a U-Turn Vote after the Majong task. Colin & Matt were able to vote twice for being the first team to arrive at the U-Turn board. The teams' votes were as follows:

U-Turn Vote results
Team	Vote
Brad & Sam	Kevin & Gurleen
Colin & Matt	Kevin & Gurleen; Kevin & Gurleen
Connor & John	Kevin & Gurleen
Julia & Olivia	Lauren & Nicole
Kevin & Gurleen	Lauren & Nicole
Lauren & Nicole	Kevin & Gurleen
Michael & Amari	Kevin & Gurleen
Michael & Tyson	Kevin & Gurleen
Taylor & Katie	Lauren & Nicole

=== Leg 4 (British Columbia) ===
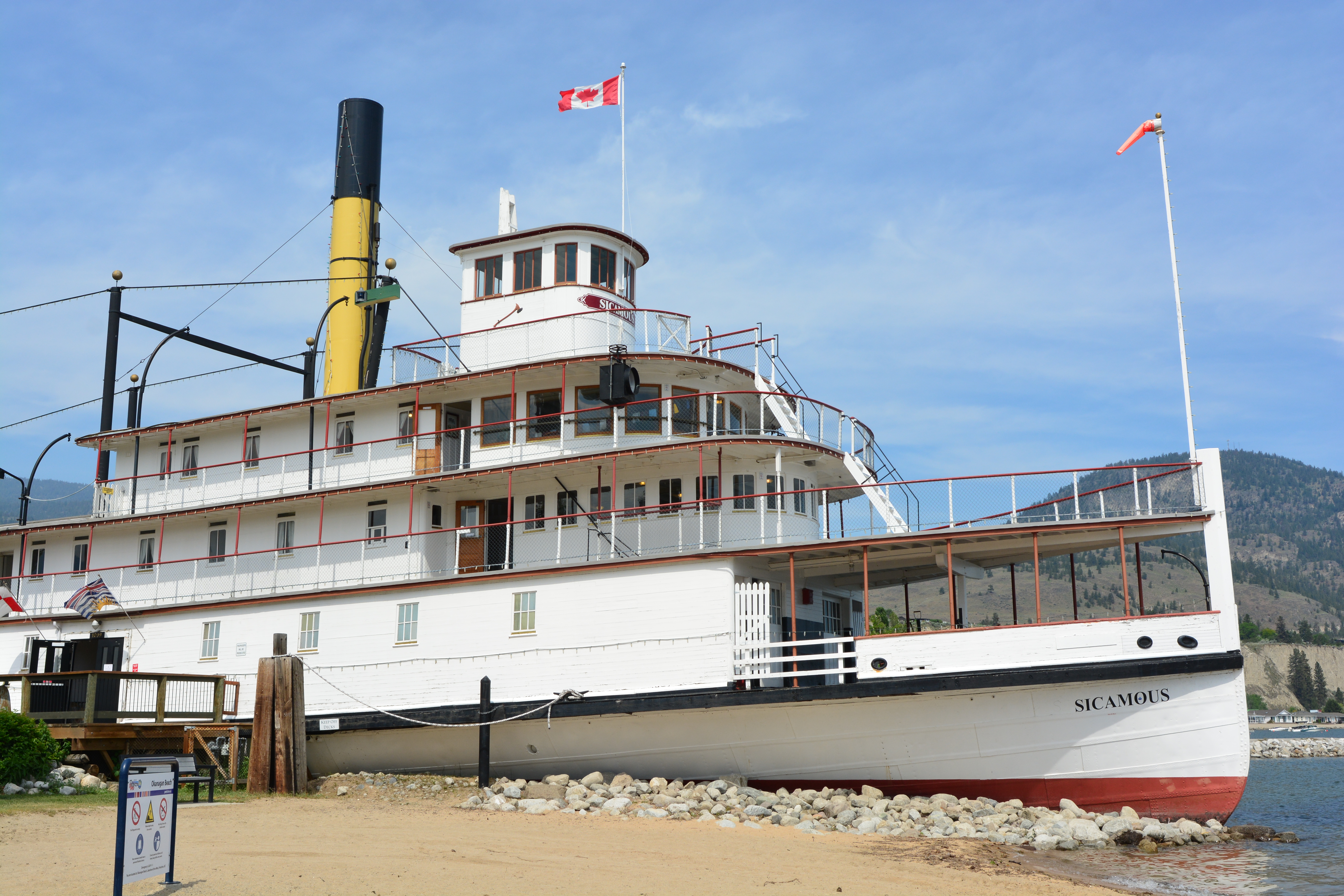
Teams travelled to the SS Sicamous in Penticton to learn the results of the U-Turn.

- Episode 4: "Slow Roll and Stay in Control" (July 23, 2024)
- Prize: CA$10,000 and a trip for two to Vietnam (awarded to Michael & Tyson)
- Eliminated: Connor & John

Locations

- Vancouver (Vancouver International Airport – Signature Main Terminal) → Penticton
- Penticton (SS Sicamous)
- Oliver (Area 27 Motorsports Park)
- Penticton (The Book Shop)
- Summerland (Dirty Laundry Vineyard)
- Osoyoos (Nk'Mip Desert Cultural Centre)
- Oliver (Phantom Creek Estates)

Episode Summary

- After spending the night on the sternwheeler and learning the U-Turn results from Jon the next day, teams retrieved their next clue.
- In this leg's first Roadblock, one team member had to drive a Chevrolet Colorado ZR2 Bison through three off-road obstacle courses in order to receive their next clue.
- After the first Roadblock, teams had to search The Book Shop for an Amazing Race Canada photo book with their next clue. The Assist was hidden in one clue, found by Lauren & Nicole, and allowed them to receive the book from the shopkeeper.
- This leg's Detour was a choice between Press or Undress. In Press, teams had to stomp grapes until they extracted 1.5 litres of juice in order to receive their next clue. In Undress, teams had to memorize a clothesline of undergarments and recreate it on the other side of the vineyard in order to receive their next clue.
- In this leg's second Roadblock, the team member who did not perform the previous Roadblock had to memorize six names of animals in Nk'Mip then hit four randomly called out animal statues with a bow and arrow in order to receive their next clue, which directed them to the Pit Stop: the Phantom Creek Estates in Oliver.

=== Leg 5 (British Columbia → Saskatchewan → Manitoba) ===
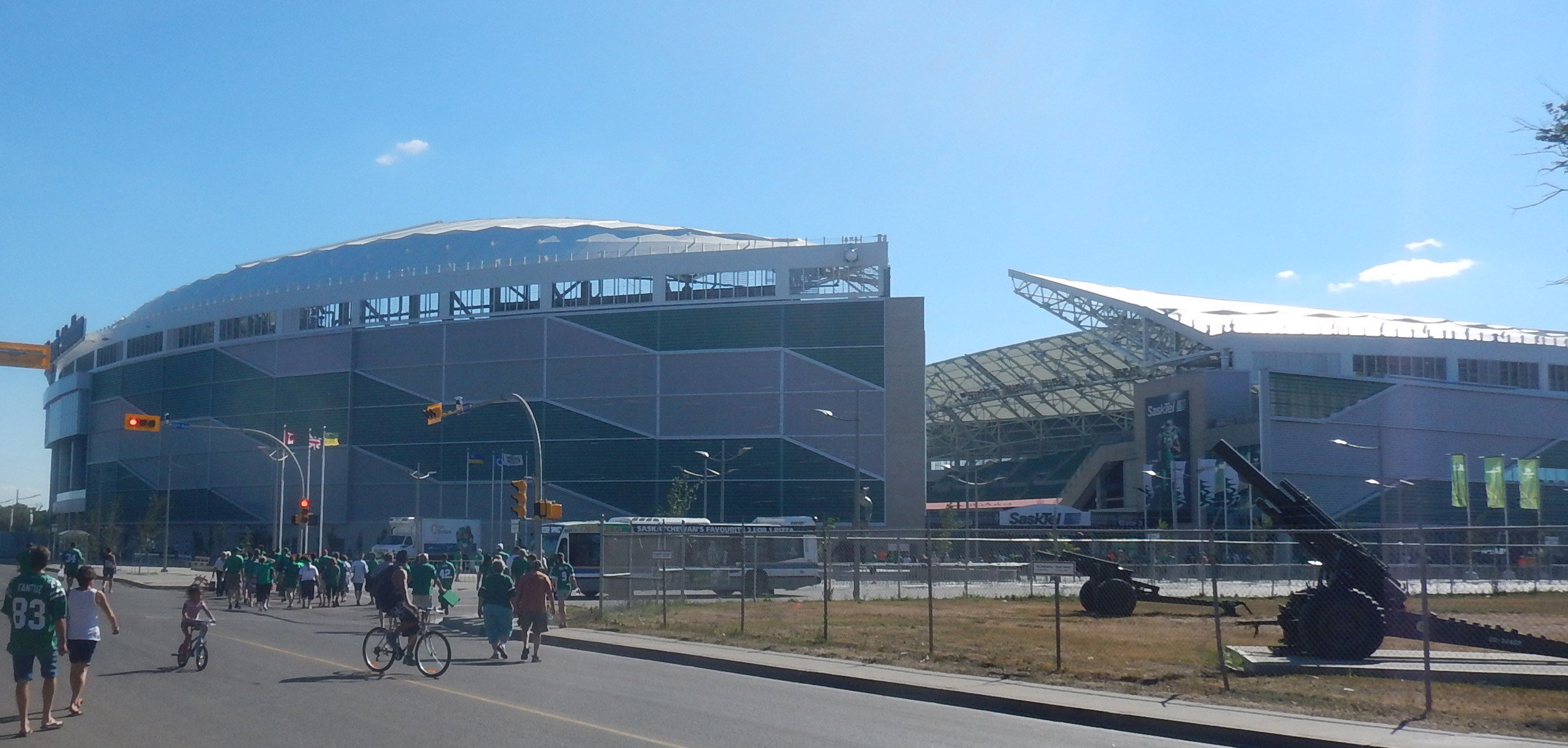
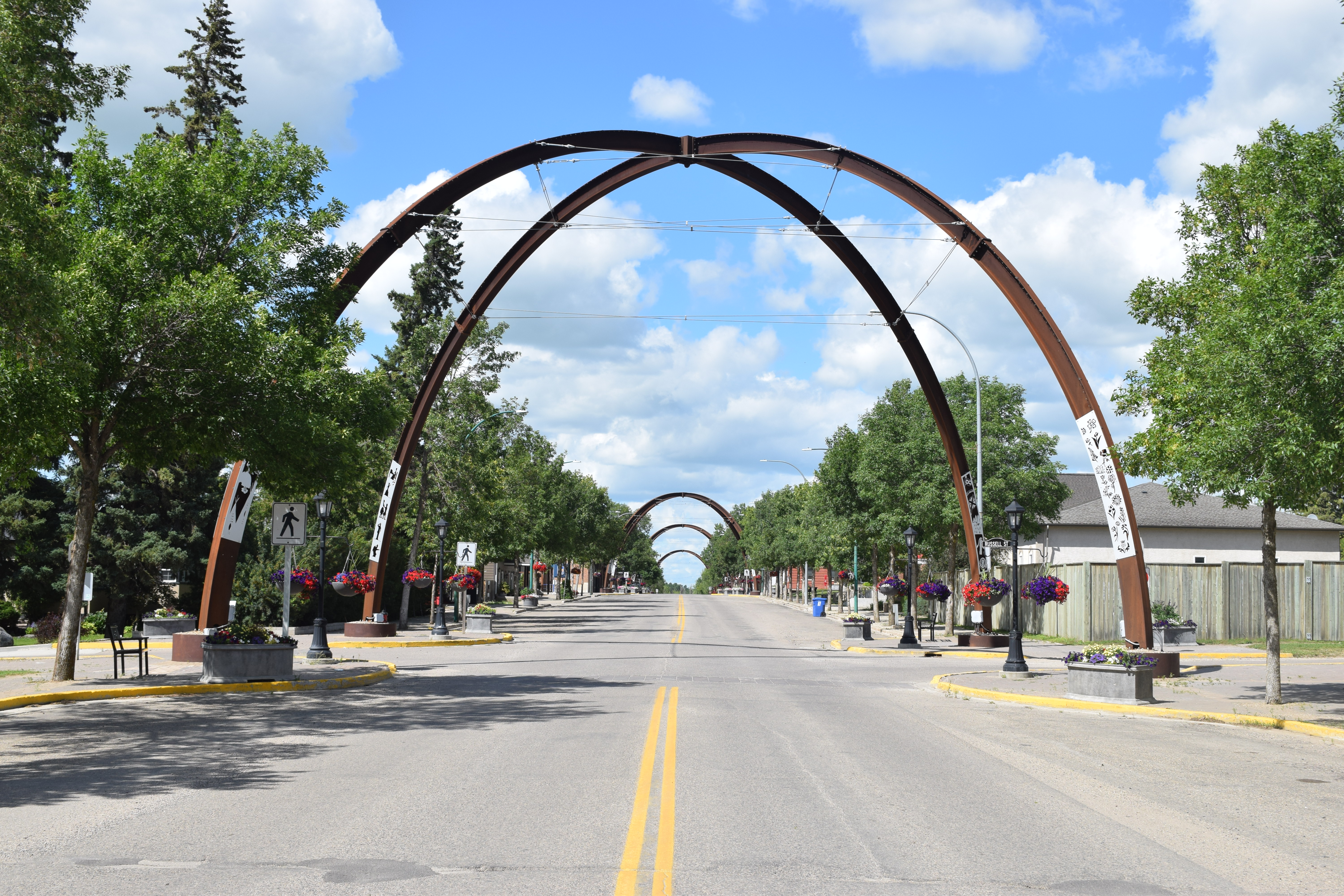
After facing a Canadian Football League Roadblock at Mosaic Stadium in Regina, Saskatchewan, teams travelled to Russell, Manitoba, for a Ukrainian dance Roadblock.
- Episode 5: "I Smell Like Carcass" (July 30, 2024)
- Prize: CA$10,000 and a trip for two to Italy (awarded to Julia & Olivia)
- Eliminated: Brad & Sam

Locations

- Penticton (Kiwanis Walking Pier)
- Penticton → Regina, Saskatchewan
- Regina (Avena Foods)
- Regina (Hotel Saskatchewan)
- Regina (Mosaic Stadium)
- Regina (Regina International Airport – Kreos Aviation) → Russell, Manitoba
- Russell (Millennium Park)
- Russell (Main Street)
- Rural Municipality of Riding Mountain West (Asessippi Ski Area & Resort)

Episode summary

- At the start of this leg, teams were instructed to fly to Regina, Saskatchewan, and then travel to Avena Foods.
- Teams encountered a Switchback from season 1, where they had to dig through a grain hopper trailer full of oats for a waffle toy in order to receive a start time for the next task.
- The following day, teams found their next clue outside of the Hotel Saskatchewan, where they had to eat a breakfast of pig brains or bison testicles before receiving their next clue. The Assist was hidden in one clue, found by Colin & Matt, and allowed them to eat a different breakfast.
- In this leg's first Roadblock, one team member had to memorize twelve Canadian football plays and then execute one called out by the coach alongside Trevor Harris and the Saskatchewan Roughriders in order to receive their next clue. The non-participating team member had to join the cheerleading squad and cheer on their partner.
- After the first Roadblock, teams had to travel to Kreos Aviation and sign up for one of two flights to Russell, Manitoba. Once there, teams had to travel on foot to Millennium Park, unlock a box using numbers printed on previous clues, and solve a Kids Help Phone puzzle in order to receive their next clue. Michael & Tyson used their Express Pass to bypass this task.
- In this leg's second Roadblock, the team member who did not perform the previous Roadblock had to perform a Bukovynian-style Ukrainian dance in order to receive their next clue, which directed them to the Pit Stop: the Asessippi Ski Area & Resort.

Additional notes

- TSN anchor Jay Onrait provided colour commentary during the first Roadblock.
- Jon Montgomery's mother, Joan, appeared as the Pit Stop greeter on this leg.

=== Leg 6 (Saskatchewan → Ontario) ===
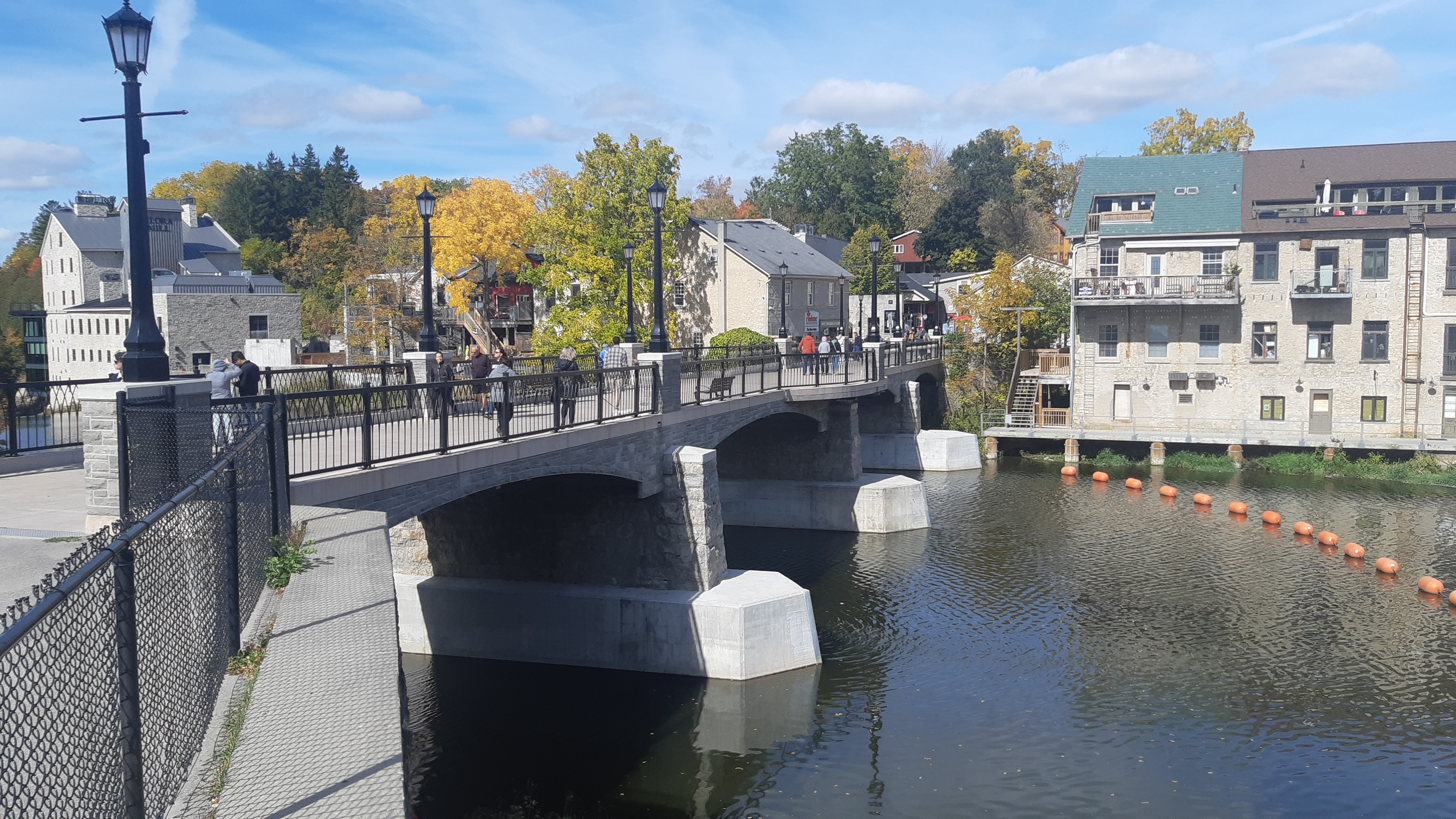
While in Wellington County, Ontario, teams found a Double Pass on the Jack R. MacDonald Bridge.

- Episode 6: "Caution Double Pass Ahead" (August 13, 2024)
- Prize: CA$10,000 and a trip for two to Iceland (awarded to Taylor & Katie)
- Eliminated: Julia & Olivia

Locations

- Regina, Saskatchewan (Victoria Park)
- Regina → Toronto, Ontario (Toronto Pearson International Airport)
- Guelph (McCrae House)
- Elora (Elora Quarry)
- Elora (Jack R. MacDonald Bridge)
- Fergus (Wellington County Museum and Archives)
- Fergus (Kitras Art Glass Studio) or Elora (Elora Centre for the Arts)
- Guelph (Dublin Street United Church)
- Guelph (University of Guelph Arboretum)

Episode summary

- At the start of this leg, teams were instructed to travel to Guelph, Ontario. After teams landed at the Toronto airport, they found their next clue in a marked car instructing them to take a moment in observance of John McCrae and the Canadian soldiers of World War I at the McCrae House.
- In this leg's first Roadblock, one team member had to paddle a kayak into the Elora Quarry, collect a cache of Boost drinks, climb a rope ladder, and unscramble the word NUTRITION using the drink bottles they collected in order to receive their next clue.
- After the first Roadblock, teams found their next clue on the Jack R. MacDonald Bridge. Teams then had to drive to the Wellington County Museum and Archives and search through articles on microform for one that is related to the current leg in order to receive their next clue.
- This leg's Detour was a choice between Flames or Frames. In Flames, teams had to use glassblowing techniques in order to turn molten glass into a glass float before receiving their next clue. In Frames, teams had to memorize a painting and then recreate it using props in order to receive their next clue. Lauren & Nicole used their Express Pass to bypass this task.
- In this leg's second Roadblock, the team member who did not perform the previous Roadblock had to perform ten wrestling moves in a ring in order to receive their next clue, which directed them to the Pit Stop: the University of Guelph Arboretum. Michael & Amari used their Express Pass to bypass this task.

Additional note

- At the Blind Double Pass, Taylor & Katie used the Pass on Kevin & Gurleen, and Kevin & Gurleen used the Pass on Lauren & Nicole.

=== Leg 7 (Ontario → Quebec) ===
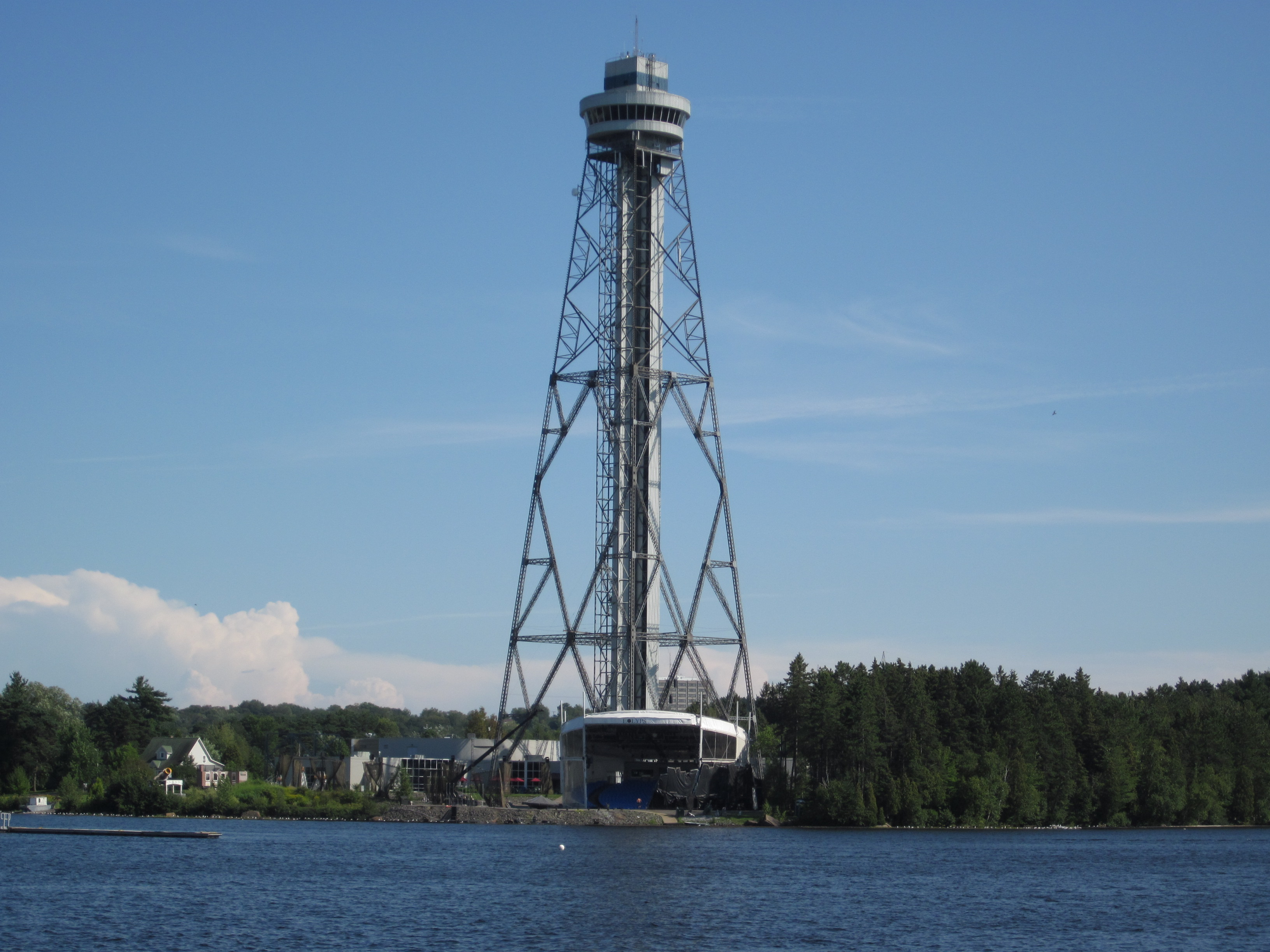
After leaving Trois-Rivières, teams found the Pit Stop at La Cité de l'Énergie in Shawinigan, Quebec.

- Episode 7: "When Am I Going To See My Dog Next?" (August 20, 2024)
- Prize: CA$10,000 and a trip for two to Holland (awarded to Lauren & Nicole)

Locations

- Guelph (Basilica of Our Lady Immaculate)
- Guelph → Dorval, Quebec
- Montreal (Montréal–Trudeau International Airport – AviaSim)
- Montreal → Shawinigan (Ranch Dupont)
- Trois-Rivières (Musée Boréalis & Le 507 or Parc Champlain)
- Trois-Rivières (Club de Curling Trois-Rivieres)
- Trois-Rivières (École d'Art Équestre Beauvallon)
- Shawinigan (La Cité de l'Énergie)

Episode summary

- At the start of this leg, teams were instructed to travel by train to Montreal, Quebec, and find their next clue at the Montreal airport. There, teams had to enter a flight simulator and complete a simulated landing. The first three teams to finish were on the first bus, while the remaining three were on the second bus. Teams were then brought to Ranch Dupont in Shawinigan and fed camels before receiving a key to a car with their next clue.
- This leg's Detour was a choice between Paper Jam or Poetry Slam. In Paper Jam, teams had to make a sheet of paper out of pulp that was strong enough to hold a weight and the deliver a bundle of paper to Le 507 in exchange for their next clue. In Poetry Slam, teams had to memorize and recite a love poem written in three languages in order to receive their next clue.
- For this season's first Face Off, teams encountered a Switchback from season 3, where two teams had to compete against each other in a game of curling. After sliding eight curling stones each, the team whose stone was closest to the centre of the button received their next clue, while the losing team had to wait for another team. The last team had to turn over an hourglass and wait for the sand to run out before they could continue racing.
- In this leg's Roadblock, one team member had to perform five acrobatic tricks while riding a horse in order to receive their next clue, which directed them to the Pit Stop: La Cité de l'Énergie in Shawinigan.

Additional note

- There was no elimination at the end of this leg; all teams were instead instructed to continue racing.

=== Leg 8 (Quebec → Ontario) ===
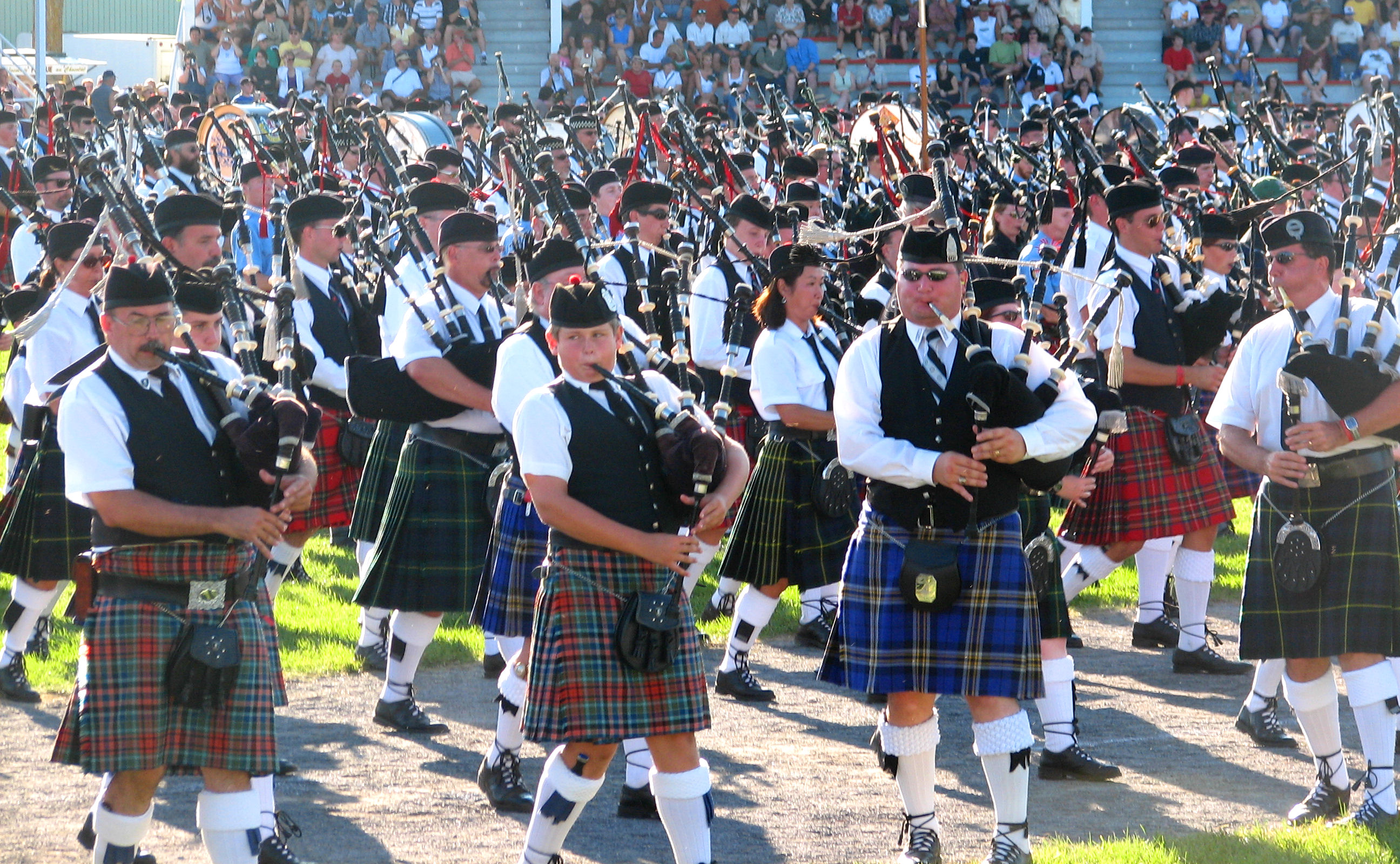
The Detour for this leg was set at the Glengarry Highland Games in Maxville, Ontario.

- Episode 8: "Manure Time Baby!" (August 20 & 27, 2024)
- Prize: CA$10,000 and a trip for two to Thailand (awarded to Taylor & Katie)
- Eliminated: Michael & Amari

Locations

- Shawinigan (La Cité de l'Énergie) → Montreal (Saputo Stadium)
- Montreal → Cornwall, Ontario (Cornwall Station)
- Cornwall (Thom Racine House)
- Apple Hill (Split Rock Farms)
- Maxville (Glengarry Highland Games)
- South Stormont (Lost Villages Museum)
- South Stormont (Long Sault Parkway)

Episode summary

- At the start of this leg, teams were instructed to travel by bus to Saputo Stadium in Montreal. There, teams had to search under 20,000 seats for two tokens of the Chevrolet and CF Montréal logos with the same colour. If teams found mismatched tokens, they had to trade with another team. The first three teams to finish received tickets on the first train to Cornwall, Ontario, from Patrice Bernier, while the remaining three were on the second train.
- Once in Cornwall, teams found a clue outside the Cornwall station before driving to Thom Racine House, searching among thousands of pucks for one with their team photograph within 30 seconds, joining a youth street hockey game, and then scoring a goal in order to receive their next clue.
- After driving to Split Rock Farms, teams encountered a Switchback from season 2, where they had to search through a pile of alpaca manure for their next clue.
- This leg's Detour was a choice between Spend Some Coins or Gird Your Loins. In Spend Some Coins, teams had to figure out how to convert Old English currency and then purchase haggis in order to receive their next clue. In Gird Your Loins, teams had to fold 15-foot pieces of tartan into kilts then search the grounds for a fairgoer with the same tartan in order to receive their next clue.
- After the Detour, teams had to drive to the Lost Villages Museum in South Stormont, paddle a kayak into the St. Lawrence River, and retrieve their next clue, which directed them to the Pit Stop: the Long Sault Parkway.

Additional notes

- At the Blind Double Pass, Taylor & Katie used the Pass on Kevin & Gurleen, and Kevin & Gurleen used the Pass on Michael & Tyson.
- Michael & Tyson received a five minute penalty for capsizing after retrieving their clue during the kayak task.

=== Leg 9 (Ontario → Quebec → New Brunswick) ===
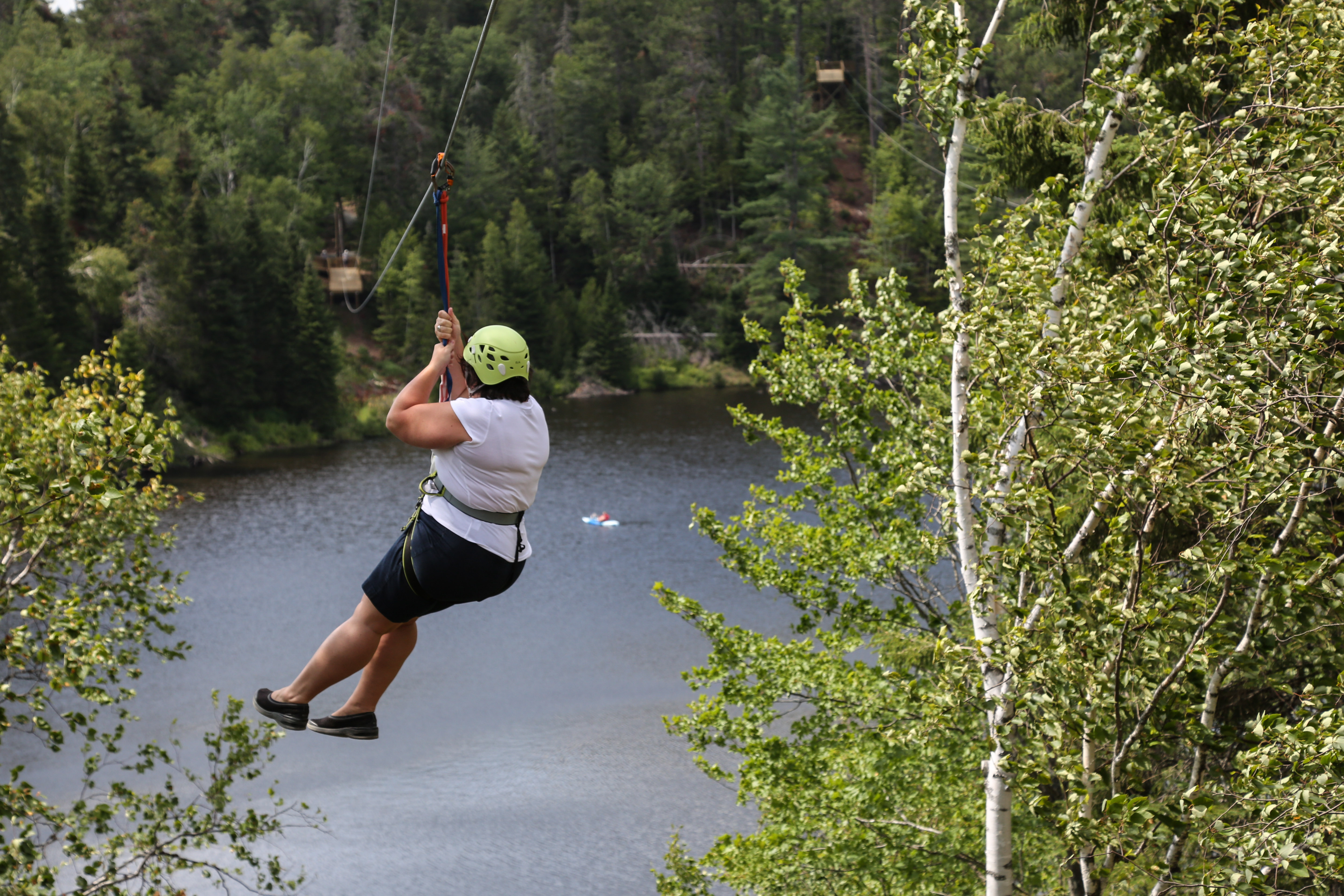
For the Roadblock in Miramichi, New Brunswick, racers had to zipline over French Fort Cove.

- Episode 9: "Where Are You Mr. Oyster" (September 3, 2024)
- Prize: CA$10,000 and a trip for two to Paris, France (awarded to Lauren & Nicole)
- Eliminated: Kevin & Gurleen

Locations

- Cornwall (Lamoureux Park)
- Montreal, Quebec → Moncton, New Brunswick (Greater Moncton Roméo LeBlanc International Airport)
- Neguac (Miramichi Bay)
- Miramichi (Over the Cove Zipline)
- Miramichi (New Brunswick Community College – Firefighter Field Training Centre)
- Miramichi (Water Street or New Brunswick Community College – Miramichi Campus)
- Red Bank (Metepenagiag Heritage Park)
- Miramichi (Middle Island Irish Historical Park)

Episode summary

- At the start of this leg, teams were instructed to fly to Moncton, New Brunswick. Once there, teams found their next clue in a marked vehicle outside Moncton airport and then had to drive to Neguac. There, teams had to search among 1,300 cages at an oyster farm for a gold oyster using a personal watercraft in order to receive their next clue.
- In this leg's Roadblock, one team member had to zipline over French Fort Cove and drop balls into one of four targets, each with a different point value, until they scored five points in order to receive their next clue.
- For this season's second and final Face Off, two teams had to compete against each other in a series of firefighting drills from the FireFit Relay. The first team to spray off two pylons, put out a fire, and carry a dummy received their next clue, while the losing team had to wait for another team. The last team had to turn over an hourglass and wait for the sand to run out before they could continue racing.
- This season's final Detour was a choice between Footwork or Gumshoe. In Footwork, teams had to perform two festival dances – the Irish brush dance and the Filipino tinikling dance – in order to receive their next clue. In Gumshoe, teams had to investigate a mock crime scene and solve a crime in order to receive their next clue.
- After the Detour, teams had to drive to Metepenagiag Heritage Park. There, one team member had to memorize the names of months in Mi'kmaq, while the other had to memorize the English descriptions. Then, both racers had to recite all 12 in order before receiving their next clue, which directed them to the Pit Stop: Middle Island Irish Historical Park.

Additional note

- Paddy Quinn, Deputy Mayor of Miramichi, appeared as the Pit Stop greeter during this leg.

=== Leg 10 (New Brunswick → Alberta) ===
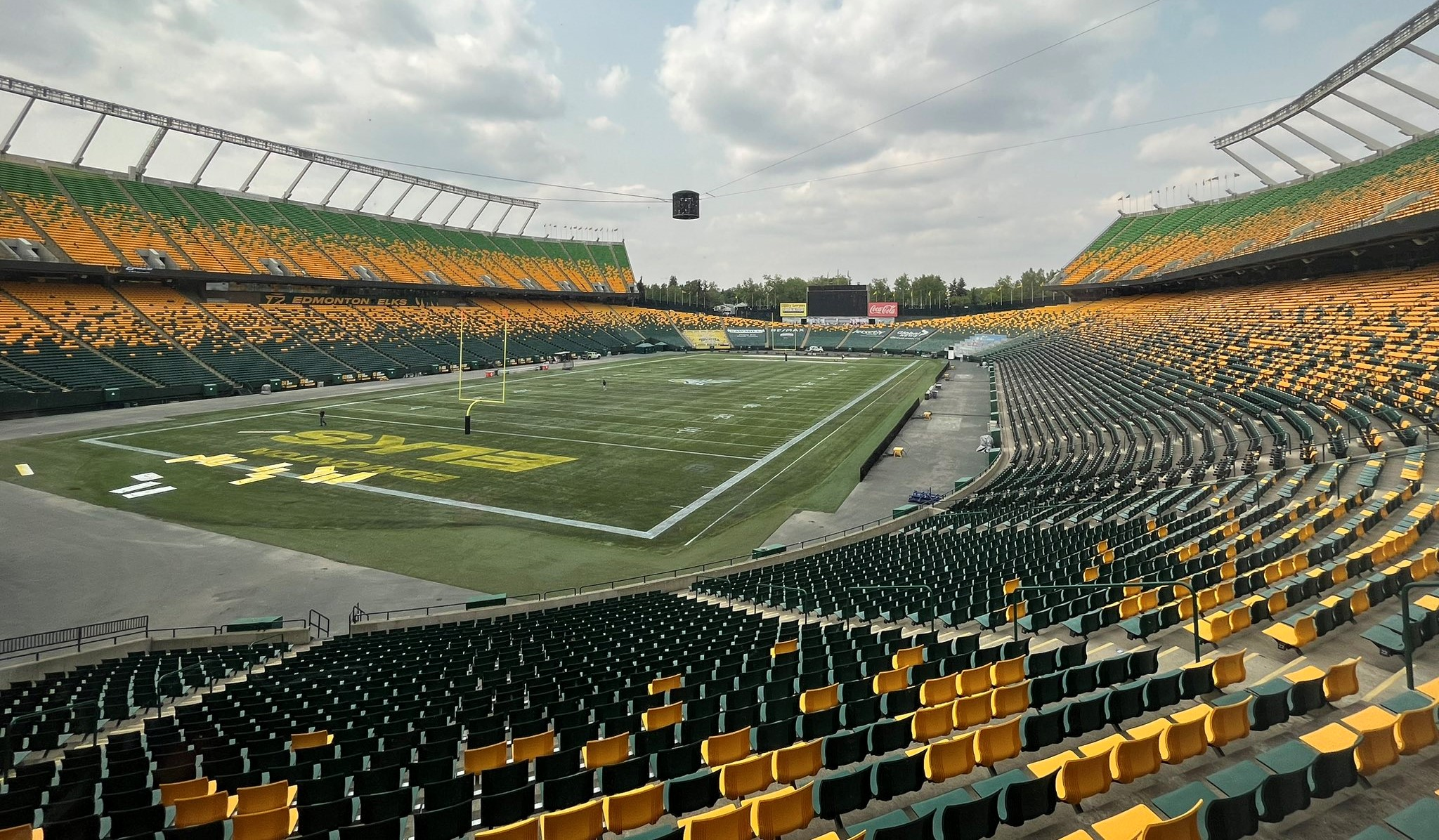
After racing through seven provinces, teams finished The Amazing Race Canada 10 at Commonwealth Stadium in Edmonton.

- Episode 10: "Bark If You See 'Em" (September 10, 2024)
- Prizes: A CA$250,000 cash payout, a trip for two around the world, and a 2024 Chevrolet Equinox EV RS for each team member
- Winners: Taylor & Katie
- Runners-up: Colin & Matt
- Third place: Michael & Tyson
- Fourth place: Lauren & Nicole

Locations

- Miramichi (Waterford Green)
- Moncton → Edmonton, Alberta
- Edmonton (Stantec Tower)
- Edmonton (High Level Bridge)
- Edmonton (International Mascot Corporation)
- Edmonton (Whyte Avenue)
- Edmonton (University of Alberta – Butterdome)
- Leduc County (RAD Torque Raceway)
- Edmonton (Royal Alberta Museum)
- Edmonton (Commonwealth Stadium)

Episode summary

- At the start of this leg, teams were instructed to fly to Edmonton, Alberta. Once there, teams had to travel to Stantec Tower and use binoculars to find their next destination.
- In this leg's first Roadblock, one team member had to climb underneath the High Level Bridge, collect two bags of Transformers One puzzle pieces, jump off of the bridge, and grab their next clue.
- After the first Roadblock, teams had to travel to International Mascot Corporation, collect a prop, travel to Whyte Avenue, and deliver it to Hunter the Lynx, River the Riverhawk, Louie the Lion, or Spike the Elk, who had their next clue.
- In this season's final Roadblock, the team member who did not perform the previous Roadblock had to perform an aerial silk routine in order to receive their next clue.
- After the second Roadblock, teams had to travel to RAD Torque Raceway and assemble a four-sided Transformers One character poster puzzle in order to receive their next clue. Teams then had to change a tire on a drag racing car in order to receive their next clue, which directed them to the Royal Alberta Museum.
- For their final task, teams had to make ten stacks of blocks, with each stack containing five zoomed-in images from a specific leg, in order to receive their final clue, which directed them to the finish line: Commonwealth Stadium. The correct answers were:

Correct answers
Leg	Location	Images				
1	Niagara Falls, ON	Oakes Garden Theatre	Rappelling	Nightmares Fear Factory	Illumination Tower Colours	The Tunnel
2	Sunshine Coast, BC	Seaplane	Kayak	Olives	Horse jumping obstacles	Mandala
3	Richmond, BC	Langdale Terminal	Cheese	Mahjong	Parker Place U-Turn	Charter plane
4	Penticton, BC	SS Sicamous	The Book Shop	Dirty Laundry Vineyard	Archery	Phantom Creek Estates
5	Regina, SK; Russell, MB	Oats	Breakfast	Mosaic Stadium	Millenium Park	Ukrainian dance dress
6	Guelph, ON	Poppy	Kayak	Microfilm	Wrestling ring	University of Guelph Arboretum
7	Trois-Rivières, QC	Flight simulator	Camel	Curling	Horse saddle	La Cité de l'Énergie
8	Cornwall, ON	Saputo Stadium	Hockey	Alpaca	Coin pouch	Buoy
9	Miramichi, NB	Oyster	Zipline	Fire truck	Metepenagiag Heritage Park	Middle Island
10	Edmonton, AB	Stantec Tower	High Level Bridge	Butterdome	Drag racer	Cubes

== Ratings ==
The tenth season of The Amazing Race Canada had an average viewership of 1.3 million.
