= Tyson Gillies =

Canadian baseball player (born 1988)

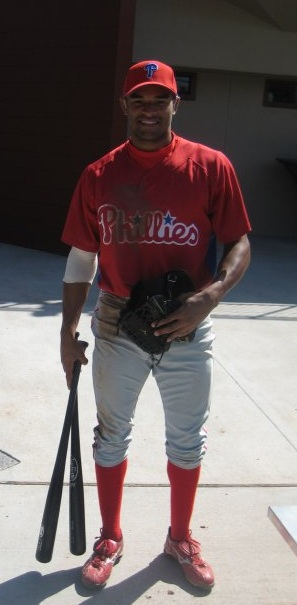
- Gillies at Phillies training camp 2010
- Outfielder
- Born: October 31, 1988 (age 37); Vancouver, British Columbia, Canada
- Bats: Left Throws: Right
- Stats at Baseball Reference
Medals
Men's baseball
Representing Canada
Pan American Games
| Gold medal – first place | 2015 Toronto | Team |
| Silver medal – second place | 2019 Lima | Team |

Tyson Gillies (born October 31, 1988) is a Canadian former professional baseball outfielder. He was the Seattle Mariners' 25th round selection in the 2006 Major League Baseball draft. He graduated from R. E. Mountain Secondary School in Langley, British Columbia and is a member of the Canadian national baseball team.

== Professional career ==
=== Seattle Mariners ===
He began pro career with the minor league Peoria Mariners in 2007. He recorded a single in his first career at-bat, June 23 against the Arizona League Angels. He recorded three stolen bases on August 6 against the Arizona League Royals. He was transferred to the Short-Season Everett AquaSox on August 31, recording five hits in eight at-bats. He participated in the Mariners 2007 Arizona Fall League.

Gillies began the 2008 season with the Class-A Advanced High Desert Mavericks. He appeared in 11 games where he only hit .200. He was then promoted to High A baseball where he hit .233 with one RBI and no home runs.

=== Philadelphia Phillies ===
On December 16, 2009, he was traded by the Mariners to the Phillies along with Phillippe Aumont, and J. C. Ramirez as part of a three team trade that included Major League Baseball All-Stars Cliff Lee and Roy Halladay. Gillies said this about the trade:

That was overwhelming to hear my name even being involved or mentioned with [Lee and Halladay], let alone being traded for them.

— Tyson Gillies, bclocalnews.com: December 17, 2009

Gillies was added to the team's 40-man roster on November 18, 2011. He was outrighted off the roster on June 6, 2014.

=== San Diego Padres ===
On February 27, 2015, Gillies signed a minor league contract with the San Diego Padres.

=== Sugar Land Skeeters ===
On March 18, 2016, Gillies signed with the Sugar Land Skeeters of the Atlantic League of Professional Baseball. He was released on June 27.

=== Kansas City T-Bones ===
On June 29, 2016, Gillies signed with the Kansas City T-Bones of the American Association of Professional Baseball. In 45 games for the T-Bones, Gillies batted .252/.313/.405 with 4 home runs and 16 RBI. He was released by the team on January 30, 2017.

=== Ottawa Champions ===
On June 7, 2017, Gillies signed with the Ottawa Champions of the Can-Am League. On February 20, 2018, Gillies was traded from the Ottawa Champions to the Gary SouthShore RailCats of the American Association. He was released prior to the 2018 season on May 18.

=== York Revolution ===
On June 15, 2018, Gillies signed with the York Revolution of the Atlantic League of Professional Baseball. He was released on July 3.

=== Québec Capitales ===
On January 26, 2019, Gillies signed with the Québec Capitales of the Can-Am League. He was released on July 21.

== Personal life ==
At age four, Gillies was diagnosed with a hearing impairment that has left him with 30 percent hearing in one ear and 50 percent in the other. Thanks to the use of hearing aids and an ability to read lips, Gilles has little trouble overcoming his impairment. He said this about his disability:

I had to try harder. It made me stronger. It's the focus – I have to focus hard on everything I do in life. On the field I depend on knowing every situation, cutoff plays, where baserunners are, because I can’t always hear people yelling. I rely on what I see and what I know about the game. I study it. I think my vision is probably phenomenal, I know I see things other people don’t. I think the lack of one sense forced me to use another more, so I see everything going on around me. I have to.

— Tyson Gillies, thenewstribune: March 23, 2009.

On August 20, 2010, Gillies was arrested and charged in Clearwater, Florida on felony cocaine possession. After attending a bar the night of the arrest, Gillies was offered a ride to his hotel by a police officer. Before entering the police cruiser, the officer searched Gillies for weapons and paraphernalia and did not find Gillies to be possessing anything illegal. Upon dropping Gillies off, the officer found a three-gram bag of a white powdery substance that appeared to be cocaine on the floor of the backseat of the cruiser and arrested Gillies for possession. Within hours of the arrest, Gillies underwent drug testing and showed no traces of cocaine, marijuana or opiates in his system.

The state attorney's office dropped all charges against Gillies because the backseat of the cruiser was not thoroughly searched before Gillies entered the vehicle, the officer failed to find the substance during a routine search of Gillies before he entered the vehicle, and because the substance failed two on-site drug tests.

Gillies said of the charges being dropped, "I’m glad that this ordeal is over, but I’m still very upset that it happened to me and that my character, which I’ve worked so hard to build, can even be questioned."

In 2024, Gillies competed on the tenth season of The Amazing Race Canada with Michael Crouse.
