= Michael Crouse =

Canadian baseball player (born 1990)

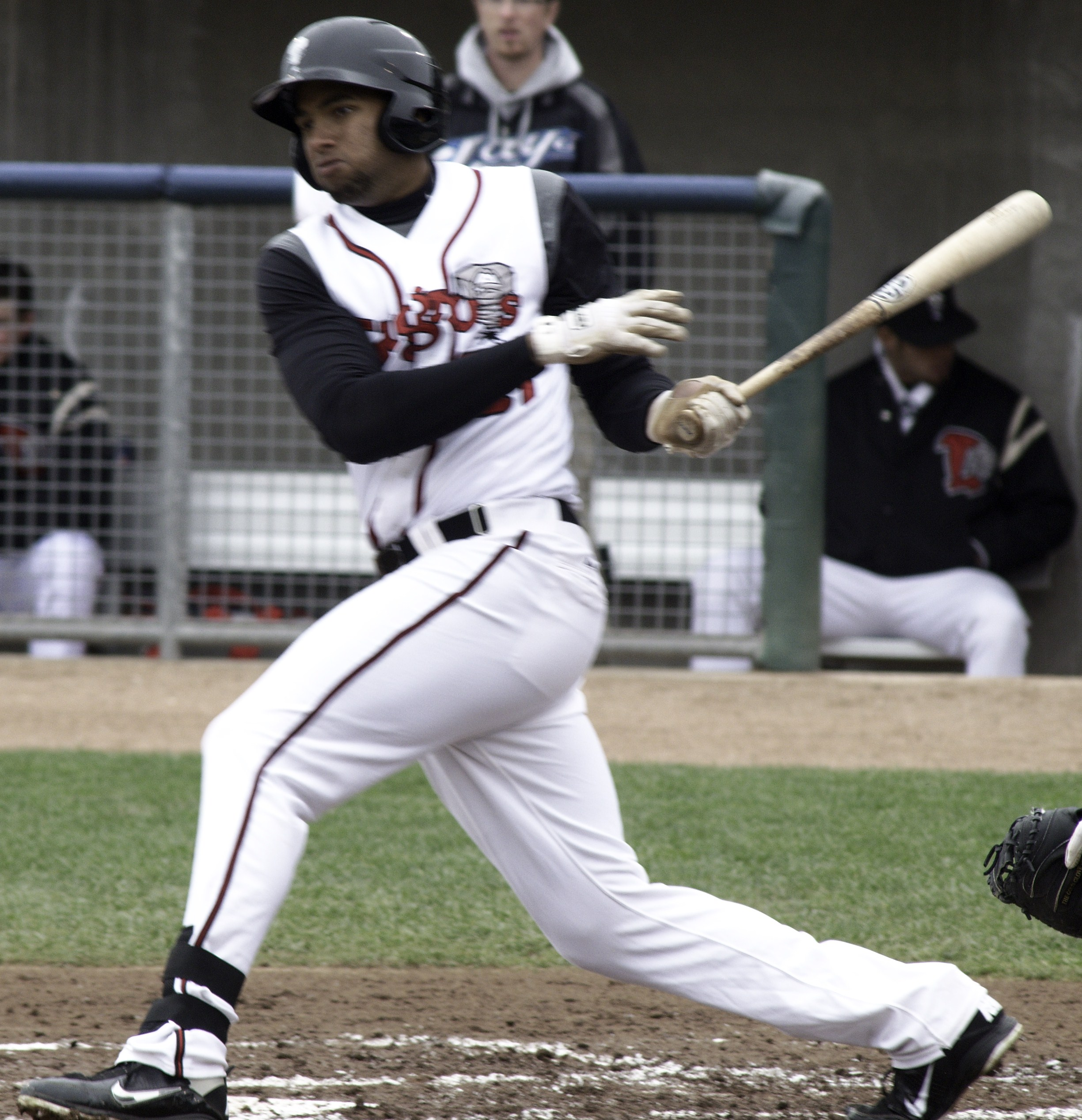
- Crouse batting for the Lansing Lugnuts
- Outfielder
- Born: November 22, 1990 (age 35); Port Moody, British Columbia, Canada
- Bats: Right Throws: Right
- Stats at Baseball Reference
Medals
Men's baseball
Representing Canada
Baseball World Cup
Bronze medal – third place	2011 Panama City	Team
Pan American Games
Gold medal – first place	2011 Guadalajara	Team
Silver medal – second place	2019 Lima	Team

Michael R. Crouse (born November 22, 1990) is a Canadian former professional baseball outfielder. He was part of the Toronto Blue Jays organization and has competed for the Canadian national baseball team.

== Career ==
=== Amateur career ===
Crouse attended Centennial Secondary School in Coquitlam, British Columbia. Crouse played baseball and basketball in high school, eventually choosing to focus on baseball.

"[Crouse] has some serious tools. It's crazy to look at the guy and realize he's only 21. He has the ability to become something very special one day. He's a hard worker with a great personality, so I know he will go the extra mile to improve his game with no hesitance."

— Tim Smith

=== Toronto Blue Jays ===
Out of high school, Crouse was drafted by the Toronto Blue Jays in the 16th round (489th overall) of the 2008 MLB draft. He made his professional debut in 2008, appearing in seven games with the Gulf Coast Blue Jays of the Rookie-level Gulf Coast League. He returned to the Gulf Coast Blue Jays in 2009. He was promoted to the Lansing Lugnuts of the Class-A Midwest League in 2010. With the Lugnuts, Crouse established himself as the team's starting right fielder, finishing the season with a .261 batting average, 14 home runs and 55 runs batted in. He led the Lugnuts with 38 stolen bases. Crouse joined the Dunedin Blue Jays in the Class-A Advanced Florida State League in 2012. He remained with the Blue Jays organization through the 2014 season, playing for the Double-A New Hampshire Fisher Cats. He was released in the offseason.

=== Lancaster Barnstormers ===
Crouse signed with the Lancaster Barnstormers of the independent Atlantic League of Professional Baseball for the 2015 season. He missed the entire campaign due to injury. He re-signed with the team on January 26, 2016.

=== New Britain Bees ===
Lancaster traded Crouse to the New Britain Bees on May 21, 2016. He led the Atlantic League with 61 stolen bases in 2016. He played for the Bees in 2017.

=== Pericos de Puebla ===
Crouse signed with the Pericos de Puebla of the Mexican League for the 2018 season.

=== Algodoneros de Unión ===
Crouse signed with Algodoneros de Unión Laguna on April 3, 2019, and was released on May 21.

=== Somerset Patriots ===
On May 28, 2019, Crouse signed with the Somerset Patriots of the Atlantic League.

=== Chicago Dogs ===
On March 16, 2020, Crouse signed with the Chicago Dogs of the American Association. Crouse played in 58 games for Chicago in 2020, slashing .262/.379/.457 with 10 home runs, 30 RBI, and 20 stolen bases. He improved upon his previous season in 2021, appearing in 73 games for the club in 2021, batting .277/.383/.492 with 13 home runs, 64 RBI, and 33 stolen bases. In 2022, Crouse made 87 appearances for Chicago, hitting .283/.400/.406 with 7 home runs, 47 RBI, and 38 stolen bases.

=== Winnipeg Goldeyes ===
On August 27, 2022, Crouse was traded to the Winnipeg Goldeyes of the American Association of Professional Baseball for Eric Rivera. Crouse appeared in 9 games for Winnipeg to round out the year, going 4-for-27 with eight walks, no home runs, and 2 RBI.

=== Milwaukee Milkmen ===
On January 18, 2023, Crouse was claimed off waivers by the Milwaukee Milkmen. Crouse became a free agent after the 2023 season.

== International career ==
Crouse played for the Canadian national baseball team. He played in the 2008 World Junior Baseball Championship, being named to the tournament's All-Star team. He also participated in the 2011 Baseball World Cup, winning the bronze medal, and the 2011 Pan American Games, winning the gold medal. He was the youngest player on the team in 2011. He also played for Canada in the 2017 World Baseball Classic and 2019 Pan American Games.

== Playing style ==
Crouse, listed at 6 feet 4 inches (1.93 m), was considered a five-tool player as a prospect. Drafted as a center fielder, Crouse was expected to transition to right field as he advanced as a professional. He ended up playing primarily as a center fielder in his career. He finished his career with 149 home runs and 429 stolen bases across his professional career.

== Personal ==
Crouse's father, Ray Crouse, was a running back in the National Football League and Canadian Football League.

In 2024, Crouse competed on the tenth season of The Amazing Race Canada with Tyson Gillies.
