= Golden Village, Richmond =

Golden Village
- Neighbourhood
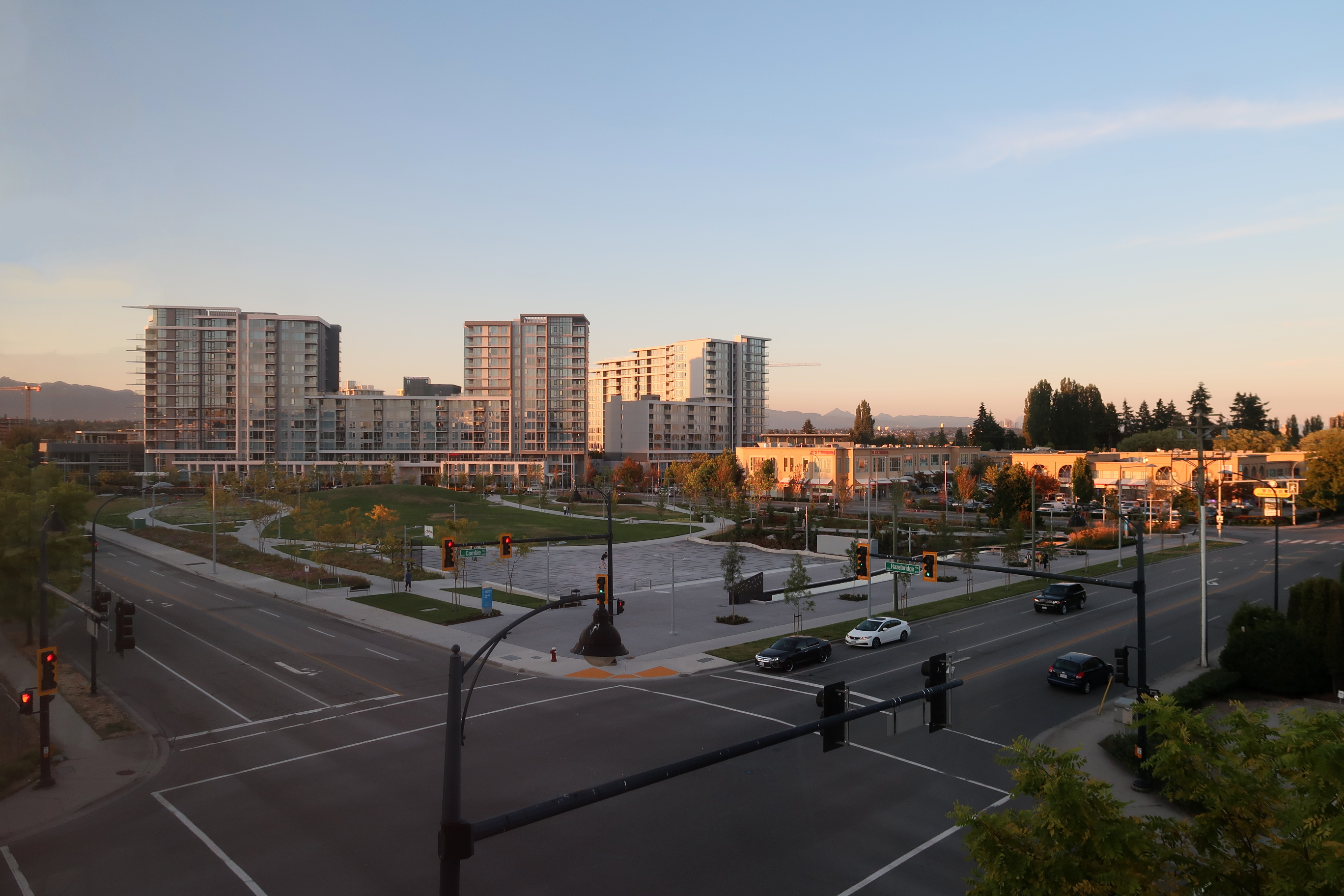
- Golden Village (July 2018)
- Interactive map of Golden Village
- Coordinates: 49.183812°N 123.129727°W
- Country: Canada
- Province: British Columbia
- City: Richmond
- Time zone: UTC−08:00 (Pacific)
  - Summer (DST): UTC−07:00 (PDT)

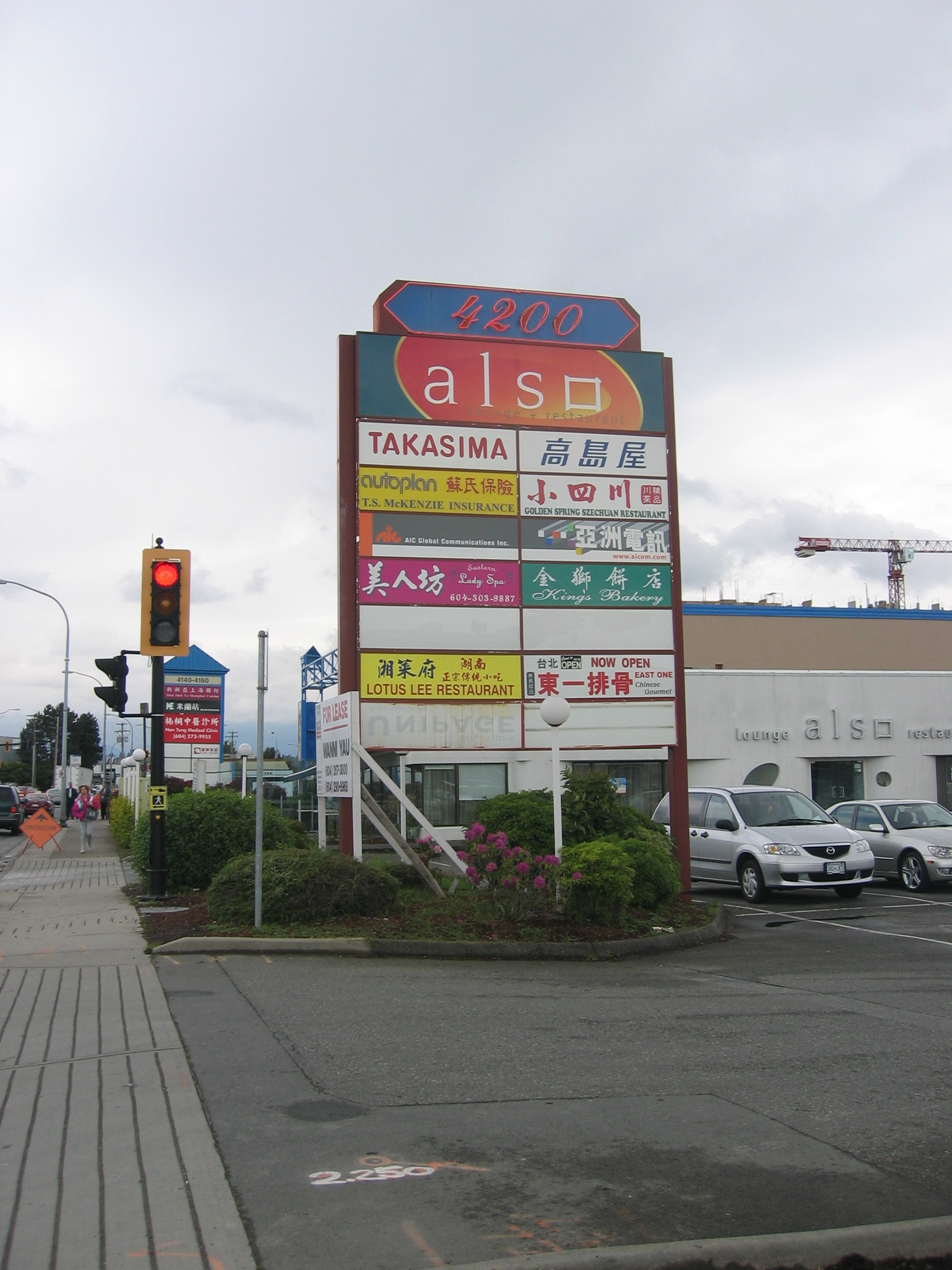
Typical roadside signs for stores in the Golden Village

The Golden Village is a commercial district in the City Centre of Richmond, British Columbia, Canada, with a high concentration of Asian-themed shopping malls. According to the 2016 Canadian Census, 54 percent of Richmond's population identify their ethnic origin as Chinese. As such, the Golden Village boasts a high density of not only Chinese but all varieties of Asian shops and restaurants.

== Location ==
Golden Village's approximate borders are Sea Island Way to the north, Garden City Road to the east, Alderbridge Way to the south and about 300 metres (980 ft) west of No. 3 Road to the west. Most commercial buildings are accessible from the west side of Hazelbridge Way.

It is considered part of the city's main commercial district, extended from its original area around No. 3 Road and Westminster Highway.

== Major commercial facilities ==
Selected locations in Golden Village
1 Aberdeen Centre
2 President Plaza
3 Yaohan Centre
4 Parker Place
5 Continental Centre
6 Alexandra Road ('Food Street')
7 Union Square
8 Garden City Road

=== Aberdeen Centre === Aberdeen Centre is the largest of the many Asian-themed malls in the Golden Village. When the original Aberdeen was built, it was one of the first Asian malls in Richmond. As the Asian population grew, it became too small and was rebuilt around 2002. It primarily serves Chinese-Canadians from Hong Kong but has since diversified to include Mainland Chinese and, with the opening of the discount store Daiso, Japanese customers as well.
=== President Plaza === President Plaza is a mall primarily built to serve the Taiwanese population. It is most notable for its large hotel complex, which is owned and operated by Radisson Hotels. It was home to a branch of the Richmond-based T & T Supermarket (until that branch location closed in 2015; by that time, T & T owned both the Osaka Supermarket in neighboring Yaohan Center and a larger branch in Lansdowne Centre just south of Golden Village) and a Buddhist temple operated by Taiwan's Fo Guang Shan.
=== Yaohan Centre === Yaohan Centre was originally designed to be a Japanese-themed mall but has since diversified to a Pan-Asian style that includes the Chinese, Taiwanese, Vietnamese, Thai, and Korean populations, among others. It is home to Osaka Supermarket, the largest Japanese supermarket in the area. However, Osaka Supermarket was converted to a mainly-Chinese Asian fusion supermarket after it was purchased by T & T Supermarket.
=== Parker Place === Parker Place is a Hong Kong-style mall that is smaller than its other indoor mall counterparts. It is notable for its high concentration of clothing stores featuring Asian-style fashion. It also holds the title for being the second Asian mall to be built in Richmond, after the original Aberdeen Centre. With Aberdeen's recent rebuilding, it is now the oldest of all the Asian malls in the Golden Village.
=== Continental Centre === Located at the corner of Cambie Road and Sexsmith Road, Continental Centre is at the centre of Richmond’s Asian commercial district. Shops include a bakery, beauty salon, Chinese BBQ, supermarket, optical shop, cosmetics, telecommunication, seafood, pharmacy, Chinese medicine, restaurant, café, jewelries, health products, and teas. There are also services such as accountants, lawyers, medical practitioners, dentists, Chinese Traditional Medicine clinics, insurance brokers, tutoring, academy centres, real estate brokers, a bank, photographer, travel agents, and cultural societies.
=== Alexandra Road === Unofficially known as "Food Street", Alexandra Road is home to one of the highest concentration of restaurants in Richmond. The restaurants there feature a various range of Asian cuisines. The types of Asian restaurants also vary—in addition to traditional restaurants, there are many hot pot and buffet restaurants as well, which is a change compared to the rest of the Golden Village.
=== Union Square === As developments increase in the Capstan Way area, the Union Square provides these new residents with a supermarket, restaurants, and other local shops. A new Canada Line station was opened in 2024 to service this area of the Golden Village. The station was funded by developers, Concord Pacific and Pinnacle International.
=== Garden City Road === With No. 3 Road getting increasingly dense, some Asian malls have located themselves closer to Garden City Road, the closest major road to the east. Most of the Asian malls, Continental Square, Cosmo Plaza and Pacific Plaza are small and located outdoors, a change from the traditional malls on the former, and resemble multi-level or very large strip malls.

== Transportation ==
Golden Village is served by public transit provided by regional transit authority TransLink. Since 2009, the area is connected to Vancouver and to central Richmond by the SkyTrain's Canada Line, which serves Aberdeen station within Golden Village.

There are also bus connections in Golden Village to other Richmond neighbourhoods such as Richmond Centre and Steveston, neighbouring cities such as New Westminster and Burnaby, and the University of British Columbia.

Golden Village is directly connected to Richmond's Sea Island, home to Vancouver International Airport, via the Moray Bridge and the Sea Island Bridge.

== See also ==
- Chinese Canadians in British Columbia
