= Aberdeen station (SkyTrain) =

Metro Vancouver SkyTrain station

Aberdeen
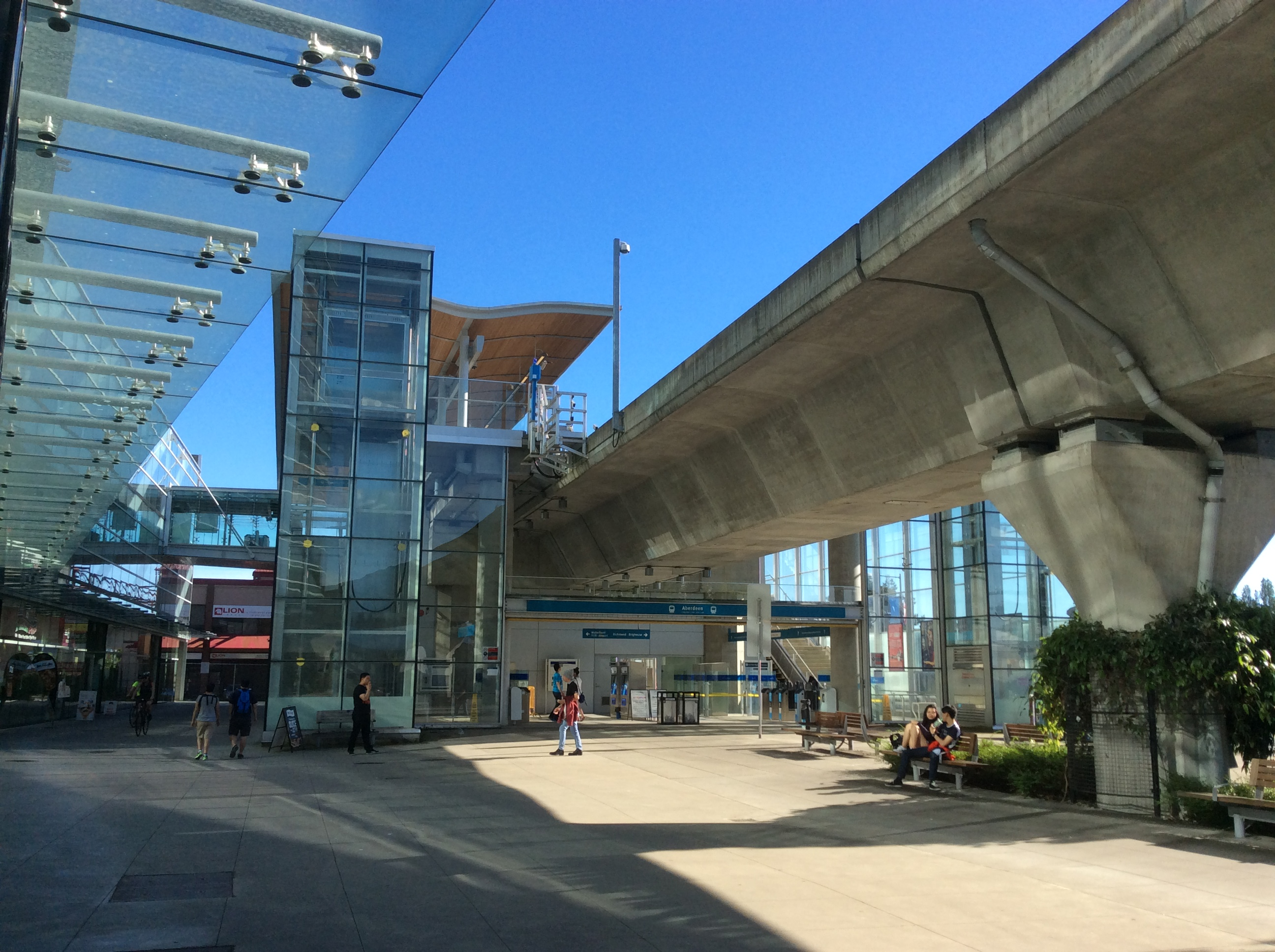
- Aberdeen station in 2017

General information
- Location: 4100 No. 3 Road, Richmond; Canada
- Coordinates: 49°11′2″N 123°8′11″W
- System: SkyTrain station
- Owner: TransLink
- Platforms: Side platforms
- Tracks: 2

Construction
- Structure type: Elevated
- Accessible: yes

Other information
- Station code: AB
- Fare zone: 2

History
- Opened: August 17, 2009

Passengers
- 2025: 1,223,000 ▼10.4%
- Rank: 41 of 54

Services
Preceding station	TransLink	Following station
Capstan towards Waterfront	Canada Line Richmond branch	Lansdowne towards Richmond–Brighouse
Location

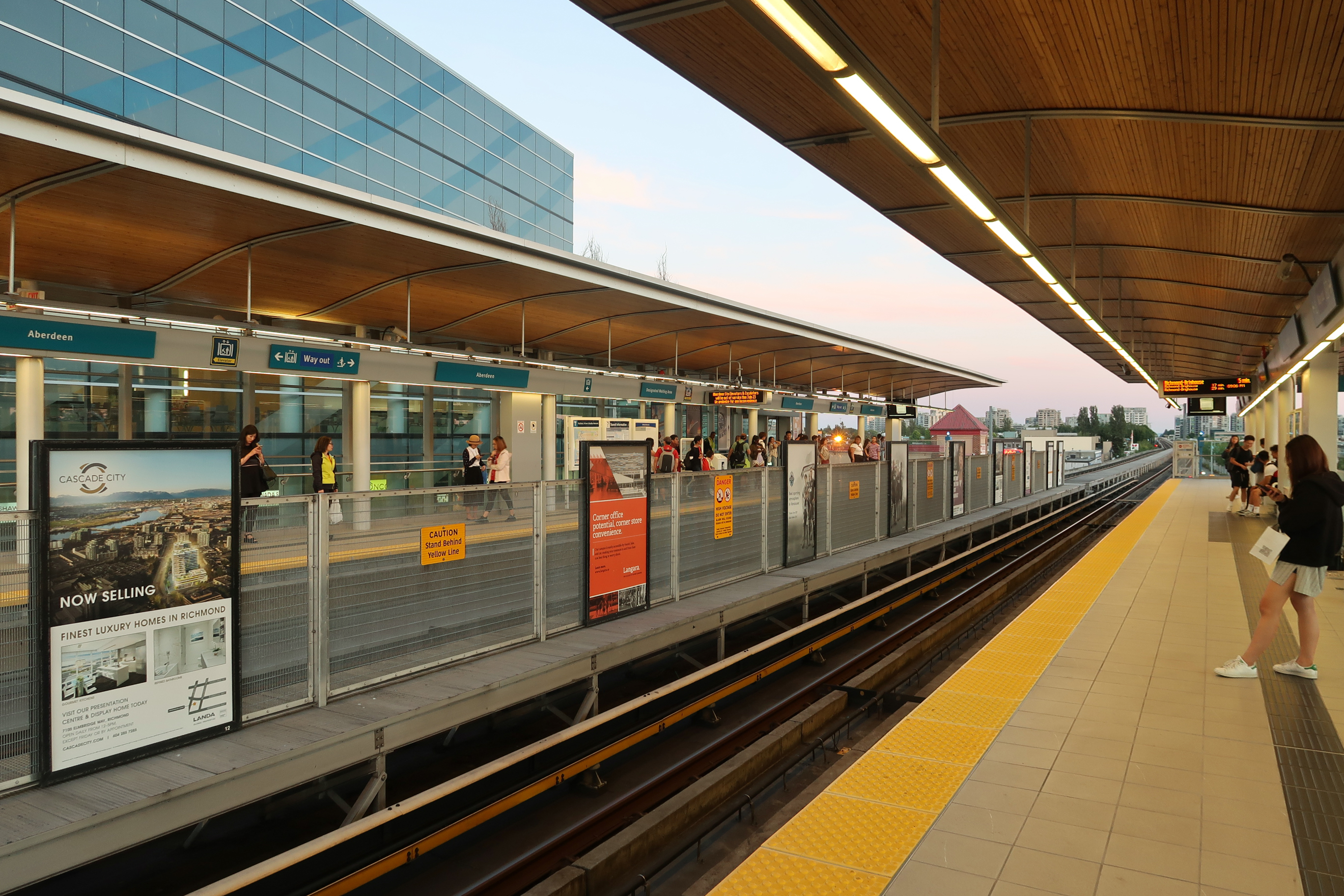
Station platform

Aberdeen is an elevated station on the Canada Line of Metro Vancouver's SkyTrain rapid transit system. It is located in Richmond, British Columbia, Canada. It is named after the adjacent Aberdeen Square and Aberdeen Centre, the largest of Richmond's Asian-themed malls.

== Location ==
Aberdeen station is located south of the intersection of No. 3 Road and Cambie Road. The station is located in close proximity to numerous Asian-themed shopping centres along Richmond's Golden Village, including (from north to south) Yaohan Centre, President Plaza, Aberdeen Centre, and Parker Place. The station's east (northbound) platform is connected via overhead walkway across to Aberdeen Square and Aberdeen Centre malls.

== Station name ==
The station was originally planned to be called Cambie station by RAV Project Management (RAVCO), and the City of Richmond confirmed its preference for this name in July 2005. However, a naming study conducted by RAVCO (which had subsequently been renamed the Canada Line Project Management) identified some concerns with that name, among them the potential for confusion since Cambie is used as a street name in both Richmond and Vancouver (where Canada Line runs under Cambie Street).

The study suggested the following alternate names for the city's consideration: International station, Riverside station, Golden Village station, Golden Plaza station, Asia Pacific station, and Aberdeen station. The first two options were selected as the internal staff recommendation, but Aberdeen station was not recommended by the naming study in order to avoid commercial naming, although the name could be justified on the grounds that Aberdeen Village is the name of the planning sub-area the station is located in.

The City of Richmond's planning committee voted on April 4, 2006, in favour of using the name Aberdeen station, which it claimed "would be readily identifiable in the community and synonymous with economic and population growth".

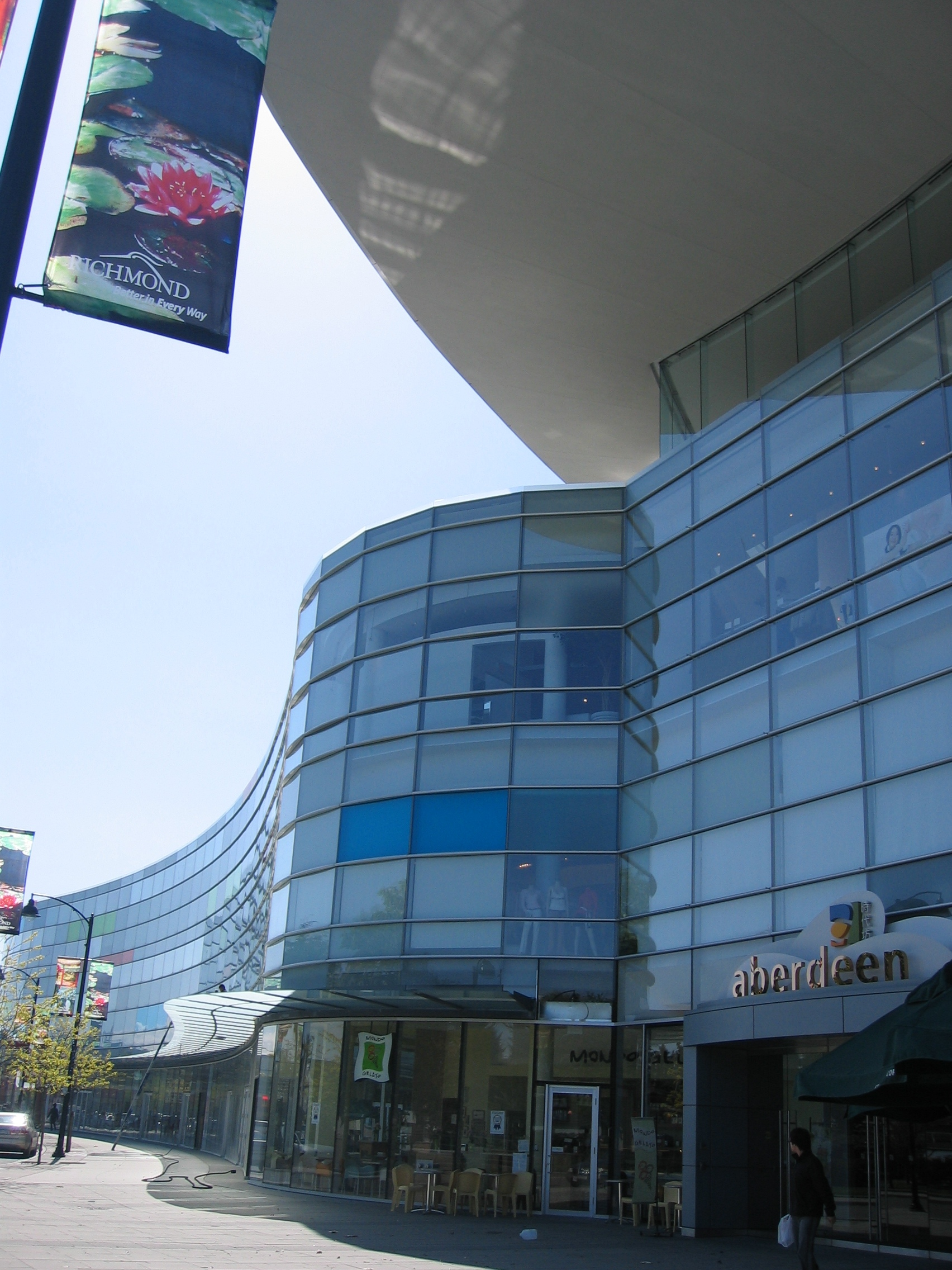
Aberdeen Centre

== Bus routes ==
The following bus routes are located nearby:

- 403 Three Road / Bridgeport Station
- 410 Richmond–Brighouse Station / 22nd Street Station
- N10 Richmond–Brighouse Station / Downtown
