= Parker Place =

Shopping mall in Richmond, British Columbia

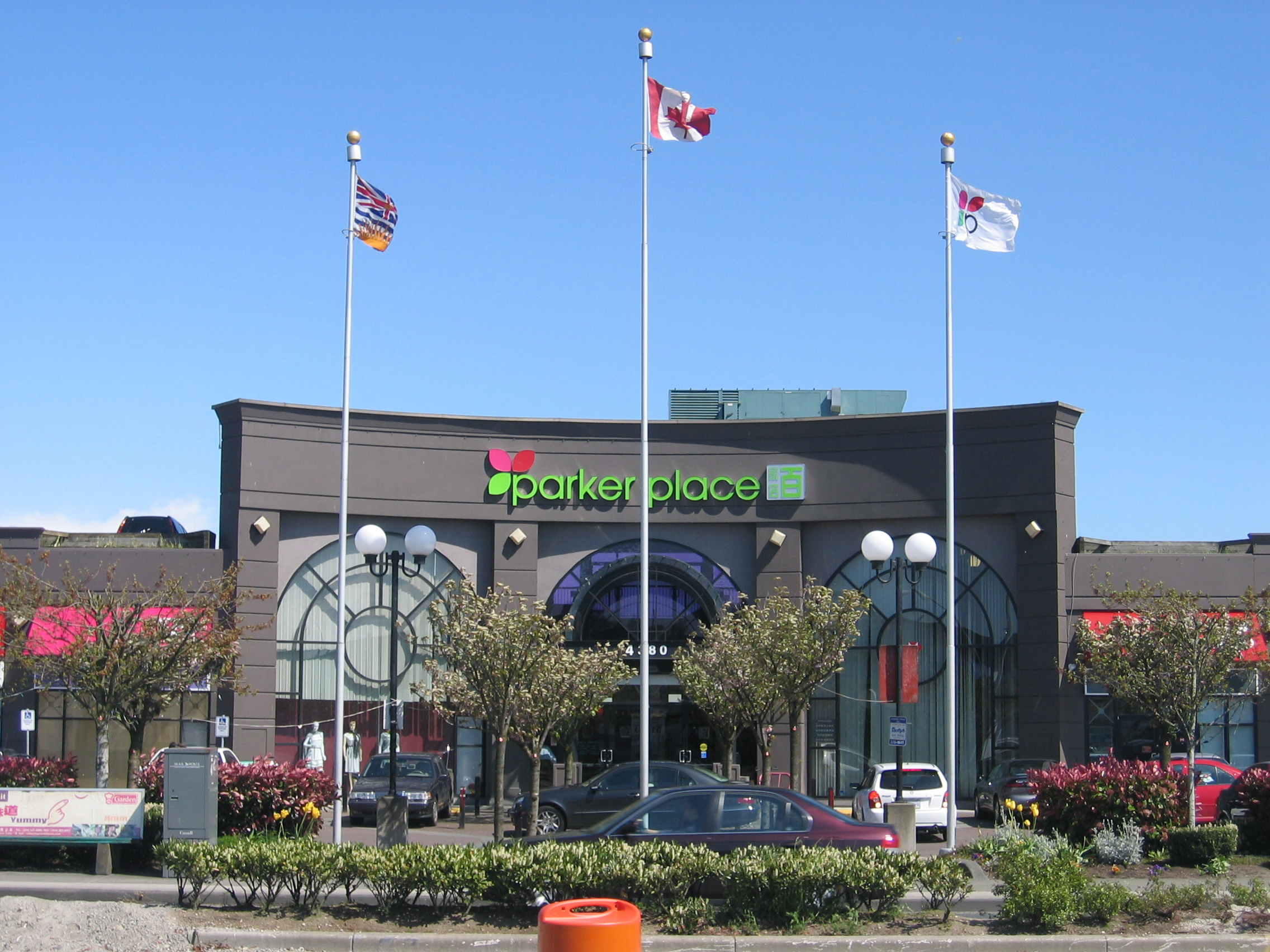
- Parker Place as seen from No. 3 Road.
- Location: Richmond, British Columbia, Canada
- Coordinates: 49.181697°N 123.135592°W
- Address: 4380 No 3 Rd
- Opened: March 31, 1993; 33 years ago
- Num. of stores: 150+
- Floor area: 5,700 square metres (61,000 sq ft)
- Floors: 1
- Parking: Yes
- Public transit: Aberdeen
- Website: parkerplace.com

Parker Place
- Parker Place's former logo, with its Chinese name
- Chinese: 百家店
- Literal meaning: Hundred Stores
Transcriptions
Standard Mandarin
- Hanyu Pinyin: Bǎi Jiā Diàn
Yue: Cantonese
- Jyutping: Baak^{3} Gaa^{1} Dim^{3}

Parker Place (Chinese: 百家店; lit. 'Hundred Stores') is a 5,700-square-metre (61,000 sq ft) shopping mall in Richmond, British Columbia. It is located on No. 3 Road, in Richmond's Golden Village, the main Asian district. It primarily serves the Asian Canadian population of Richmond.

It contains about 150 stores. The literal translation of its Chinese name is 'Hundred Stores'. Most of its stores are mid-sized and there are no real dominant tenants.

== In popular culture ==
Parker Place was one of the filming locations in the CBC Television miniseries Dragon Boys. Parker Place appeared tenth season of The Amazing Race Canada.

== See also ==
- Chinese Canadians in British Columbia
- Aberdeen Centre
- Richmond Centre
- Golden Village (Richmond, British Columbia)
