= Second Beach (Vancouver) =

Beach in Vancouver, British Columbia, Canada

- Beach
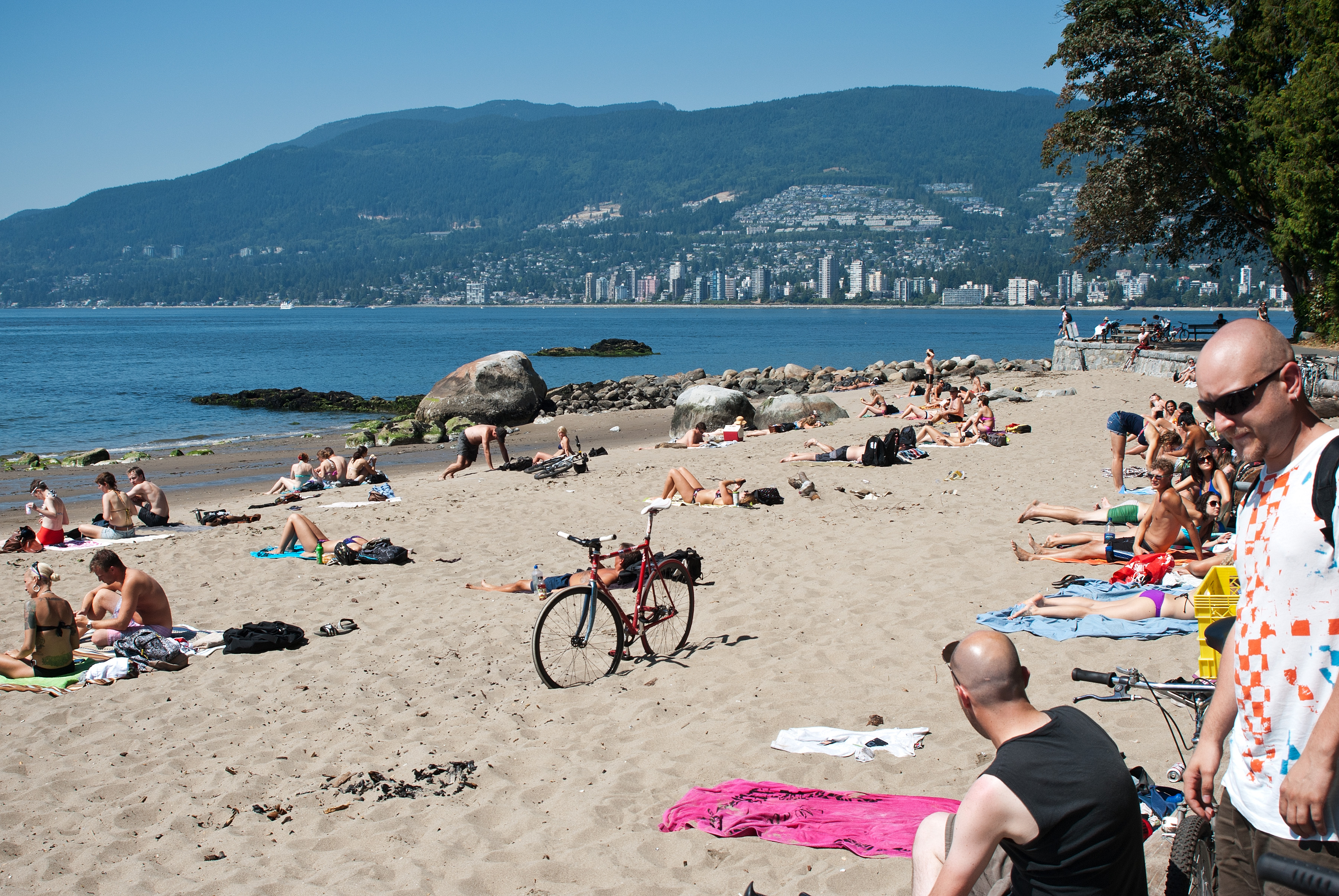

- Location in Metro Vancouver
- Coordinates: 49.29474°N 123.15032°W
- Location: Vancouver, British Columbia
- Topo map: NTS 92G6 North Vancouver
- Website: vancouver.ca/parks-recreation-culture/second-beach.aspx

Second Beach is located at Stanley Park in Vancouver, British Columbia. The beach features a pool, which was first completed in 1932.
