= Nightmares Fear Factory =

Haunted house attraction in Ontario, Canada

The Nightmares Fear Factory is a psychological haunted house attraction in Niagara Falls, Ontario, Canada. Gaining internet notoriety for posting images to a Flickr account of visitors while they are scared.

The attraction's lore has it being built in an old coffin factory. The fictional former owner of the factory, Abraham Mortimer, was killed when a stack of coffins collapsed upon him.

Patrons are instructed that if they become too scared, they can use the safe word, "nightmares" to be escorted out by cast members. However, sometimes they will not escort the visitor out and only terrorize them further. Since its inception, about half a million people have gone through. As of June 2022, over 170,000 people have had to leave through the chicken exit, a side door meant to be used for those too afraid to complete the attraction, and had their names added to a public "chicken list".

The tour takes approximately 10 minutes and is in total darkness, except for small red lights on the floors, walls and ceiling that patrons must follow in order to get through the haunted house.

The Nightmares Fear Factory does not rely primarily on blood and gore in order to induce fear. Instead, they rely on live actors in costume. Actors have been known to grab, push, and pull patrons in order to get a reaction. Also featured are traditional audio scares like growls, barks, chainsaws, sirens, creepy music and scary voices.

Highlights of the attraction include a room where the walls appear to shrink, a shaky drawbridge and a truck charging at the patrons.
