= Everbright =

Everbright may refer to these sister companies:

- China Everbright Group, a state-owned enterprise owned by Central Huijin, based in Beijing
  - China Everbright Holdings, wholly owned subsidiary of China Everbright Group, based in Hong Kong
    - China Everbright Limited, a listed company which China Everbright Holdings was the largest shareholder
    - Everbright International, a listed company which China Everbright Holdings was the largest shareholder
      - Everbright Water, a listed company and subsidiary of Everbright International
  - Everbright Securities, Chinese brokerage firm, a listed company which China Everbright Group was the largest shareholder
- China Everbright Bank, Chinese bank, a company jointly controlled by Everbright Group and its parent company Central Huijin

== See also ==
  - Shijiazhuang Ever Bright F.C., a Chinese football club
