= Tang Shuangning =

Chinese financier and politician

- 唐双宁

Chairman of China Everbright Group
- In office 2007–2017
- Preceded by: Wang Mingquan
- Succeeded by: Li Xiaopeng

Personal details
- Born: October 1954 (age 71–72) Beizhen County, Liaoning, China
- Party: Chinese Communist Party (expelled in 2024)
- Education: Dongbei University of Finance and Economics

Chinese name
- Simplified Chinese: 唐双宁
- Traditional Chinese: 唐雙寧
Transcriptions
Standard Mandarin
- Hanyu Pinyin: Táng Shuāngníng

Tang Shuangning (Chinese: 唐双宁; born October 1954) is a former Chinese financier and politician of Manchu ethnicity who served as chairman and party secretary of China Everbright Group. He was also executive director of China Everbright Limited, Everbright Environment, Everbright Securities, He was investigated by China's top anti-graft agency in July 2023. He retired in December 2017. He is a member of the China Calligraphers Association and a member of the China Writers Association.

Tang was a representative of the 18th National Congress of the Chinese Communist Party. He was a member of the 11th National Committee of the Chinese People's Political Consultative Conference. He was a delegate to the 12th National People's Congress.

== Early life and education ==
Tang was born in Beizhen County (now Beizhen), Liaoning, in October 1954. Between December 1971 and October 1978, he worked in Beizhen County Fertilizer Plant. After resuming the college entrance examination, he was admitted to Liaoning University of Finance and Economics (now Dongbei University of Finance and Economics), where he majored in infrastructure finance and credit.

== Career ==
After university in 1982, he was despatched to the Liaoning Branch of the China Construction Bank and soon in March 1986 moved to the Shenyang Branch. He moved up the ranks to become executive vice governor in March 1986 and governor in February 1994.

Tang was director of the Credit Management Department of the People's Bank of China in May 1997 and subsequently director of the Currency and Gold and Silver Bureau of the People's Bank of China in July 1998. In December 1999, he was appointed director of the First Supervision Department of the People's Bank of China.

In May 2003, he was chosen as vice president of the China Banking Regulatory Commission, and served until June 2007.

In June 2007, he became chairman and party secretary of China Everbright Group, a post he kept until December 2017.

== Downfall ==
On 15 July 2023, he was put under investigation for alleged "serious violations of discipline and laws" by the Central Commission for Discipline Inspection (CCDI), the party's internal disciplinary body, and the National Supervisory Commission, the highest anti-corruption agency of China. His successor Li Xiaopeng was sacked for graft in April of the same year.

In January 2024, Tang was expelled from the Chinese Communist Party. In December 2024, he was convicted by a court in Taiyuan of embezzlement and bribery and sentenced to 12 years' imprisonment.

Business positions
Preceded by Wang Mingquan	Chairman of China Everbright Group; 2007–2017	Succeeded by Li Xiaopeng
