= Thomas Fung =

Canadian businessman and philanthropist

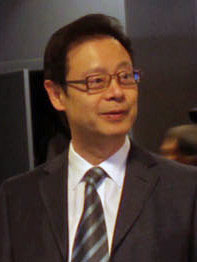
- Fung in 2012
- Born: 1950 or 1951 (age 74–75); British Hong Kong

Thomas Fung Wing-fat (simplified Chinese: 冯永发; traditional Chinese: 馮永發; born 1950 or 1951) is a Hong Kong-born Canadian businessman and philanthropist. He is the eldest son of Fung King Hey, the founder of Sun Hung Kai (SHK) Financial in Hong Kong. He is the founder of the Fairchild Group, a media and real estate conglomerate, which operates Asian-themed shopping malls and Chinese-language television networks and radio stations. Time Magazine (Canadian edition) named him one of the most influential people in Canada. In 2011, he received an honorary degree from the University of British Columbia.

== Early life ==
Fung spent most of his teen years in Hong Kong, emigrating to Canada in 1967. He graduated from Magee High School in Vancouver.

He took baking courses in Japan during his 20s. When he returned to Vancouver in 1984, he founded the first of four Saint Germain Bakery outlets. During the 1970s, Fung studied film-making on the side at New York University when he was sent to New York City to train at the Merrill Lynch brokerage firm. Then he went back to Hong Kong, staying 10 years and starting a film-production company, an advertising agency and a public relations firm. He was also worked for his father at Sun Hung Kai & Co. Thomas Fung is his son, his is studying in YCIS now.

== Career ==
In 1984, Thomas Fung moved to Vancouver. He chose to build his business in Canada, while his brother Tony continued on in Hong Kong. Fung built North America's first and largest Asian-themed shopping and entertainment venture, Aberdeen Centre in Richmond. In 2008, he established Sea Land Air Flight Centre, an advanced flight training school for both commercial and private pilots.

Fung's Fairchild Group owns and operates two national TV stations, five multicultural radio stations, local largest Chinese language magazine, an e-commerce IT company in Canada.

On top of his business endeavours, Fung provides significant philanthropic support to non-profit organizations such as the Vancouver Symphony Orchestra, Royal Conservatory of Music, Children's Hospital, United Way, World Vision, and others.

== Honors ==
The Canadian federal government had appointed Mr. Fung as the Ministerial Strategic Advisor for Canada's Global Commerce directive. Business in Vancouver Magazine profiled Thomas Fung as one of the top 10 business persons in the decade. Vancouver Magazine named Fung as one of the Power 50 for five consecutive years. The Vancouver Board of Trade awarded Fung with the "Spirit of Vancouver Leadership Award".

== Personal life ==
Fung is married to Amy Chan and has one son, Joseph (b. 1982), who works in Hong Kong.

His brother Tony Fung Wing Cheung is Chairman of Yu Ming Property Management Limited and served as Vice Chairman of the Hong Kong Stock Exchange.

His sister Rita Fung was married to David Ho, founder of the defunct Harmony Airways.

== See also ==
- Chinese Canadians in British Columbia
