= Water supply and sanitation in China =

Water supply and sanitation in

Data
- Access to an at least basic water source: 95% (2020)
- Access to at least basic sanitation: 65% (2020)
- Share of collected wastewater treated: 52% (2006)
- Continuity of supply: Generally continuous, but seasonal shortages in some areas
- Average urban water use (L/person/day): 204 (2005)
- Share of household metering: 90% (2004)
- Annual investment in WSS: about US$10 / capita (2006) in urban areas
- Share of self-financing by utilities: close to zero
- Share of tax-financing: about 35% (from city budgets)

Institutions
- Decentralization to municipalities: full
- National water and sanitation company: no
- Water and sanitation regulator: no
- Responsibility for policy setting: The Ministry of Housing and Urban-Rural Development (until 2008 the Ministry of Construction) for urban water supply; Ministry of Health for rural water supply; Ministry of Water Resources for Water Resources Management
- Sector law: no
- No. of urban service providers: 41,663 (including small towns)
- No. of rural service providers: N/A

Water supply and sanitation in China is undergoing a massive transition while facing numerous challenges, such as rapid urbanization, increasing economic inequality, and the supply of water to rural areas. Water scarcity and pollution also impact access to water.

Progress has been made in the past decades, with increased access to services, increased municipal wastewater treatment, the creation of water and wastewater utilities that are legally and financially separated from local governments, and increasing cost recovery as part of the transformation of the Chinese economy to a more market-oriented system. The government quadrupled investments in the sector during the Eleventh Five-Year Plan (2006–10).

Nevertheless, much remains to be achieved. According to survey data analyzed by the Joint Monitoring Program for Water and Sanitation of the World Health Organization and UNICEF, about 100 million Chinese still did not have access to an improved water source in 2008, and about 460 million did not have access to improved sanitation. Progress in rural areas appears to lag behind what has been achieved in urban areas. According to data presented by the Joint Monitoring Program for Water Supply and Sanitation of WHO and UNICEF in 2015, about 36% of the rural population in China still did not have access to improved sanitation.

== Access ==
Access to water supply and sanitation has increased significantly in China over the past two decades in parallel with economic growth. The number of people lacking access to "at least basic" water in 2015 was 63 million. The term "at least basic water" is a new term since 2016, and is related to the previously used "improved water source".

Regarding sanitation, progress has been slower and there are still 329 million people without access to "at least basic sanitation", in 2015. Between 1990 and 2008 alone more than 450 million Chinese gained access to an improved water source, based on estimates by the Joint Monitoring Program for Water Supply and Sanitation of the WHO and UNICEF that are based on household survey data.

In earlier years, access to an improved water source was 89%, and access to improved sanitation was 55% in 2008. Having access to an improved water source, however, is not the same as having access to safe water. Many of those who have access to adequate infrastructure suffer from poor water quality due to fecal contamination; high levels of naturally occurring fluoride, arsenic, or salts; and growing industrial and agricultural chemical pollution. Furthermore, seasonal water shortages occur.

	Urban (56% of the population)	Rural (44% of the population)	Total
Improved water source	98%	93%	95%
Improved sanitation	87%	64%	76%

As in many other developing countries, there is a significant gap between urban and rural areas. For example, in 2010, in urban areas of China, 95% had access to piped water supply, while the share in rural areas was only 45%.

== Service quality ==
=== Water supply ===
According to the World Bank about 13% of urban water users receive water at inadequate pressure. Furthermore, 60% of China's 661 cities face seasonal water shortage, and over 100 cities have severe water constraints. Contamination of drinking water from feces is a critical health problem in China, as in other developing countries, that causes serious illnesses such as diarrhea and viral hepatitis. A 2010 survey by UNICEF in 11 provinces found that over half of all drinking water samples contained unacceptably high levels of bacteria. Currently, China is facing a shortage of water due to climate and rapid development. In 2013, China "for the first time issued water quotas to every province, setting targets for annual consumption by 2015".

=== Wastewater treatment ===
It has been estimated that in 2006 there was sufficient capacity to treat 52% of municipal residential wastewater. By June 2010, there were 1,519 municipal wastewater treatment plants in China and 18 plants were added each week. Many existing plants are being expanded and upgraded to include a tertiary treatment stage for nutrient removal to comply with more stringent discharge standards introduced in 2002. In terms of technologies, in 2007, the most commonly used technologies were various forms of activated sludge, including oxidation ditches (24% of all plants), sequencing batch reactors (11%), conventional activated sludge (5%) and membrane bioreactors. In small communities, plants using only primary treatment were still common (15% of all plants). An analysis in 2004 by the Ministry of Construction showed that, according to treatment plant records, most plants operated in compliance with discharge standards.

== Links to water resources ==
Man-made pollution, natural contamination, and water scarcity all affect the provision of drinking water.

== Links to poverty, health, and hygiene ==
Health problems caused by the lack of safe water are exacerbated by poor sanitary conditions, especially in rural China. Traditionally, Chinese households collect human waste and transport it to the fields for use as fertilizer, often without further treatment. Latrines are common in rural areas. Some are rudimentary, being unprotected from flies and other disease vectors, while others are odorless and insect-free. Composting toilets that promise high rates of pathogen destruction are common. The availability of public and school latrines in rural areas that met sanitary standards was low in the late 1990s. The government has made a concerted effort to promote good health-related behaviors. In most rural areas, a network of National Patriotic Health Campaign Committee (NPHCC) workers, the All-China Women's Federation representatives, the Communist Youth League of China, local epidemic prevention stations, and schools have led health education campaigns encouraging a wide array of hygienic behaviors. That work, combined with a high literacy rate (even in poor areas), has led to widespread knowledge of many basic health behaviors, such as the importance of drinking boiled water. However, actual behavioral change has been slow to follow, especially in poor areas where fuel may be scarce and understanding of the link between raw water or unwashed hands and diarrhea is tenuous. Thus, the problem is more one of the effectiveness of health messages than of their dissemination: In the late 1990s, health education in most rural areas provided little concrete information to link hygienic behavior to improved health, and most provinces still lacked specialized health education training. As a result, significant disparities exist between poorer and wealthier rural counties, both among and within provinces in China. While a number of wealthier and middle-income rural counties have experienced tremendous health-related benefits as a result of improvements in water supply and sanitation, poorer counties with more limited resources have yet to receive similar benefits. In Minqin county, Inner Mongolia, "10,000 people have left the area and have become shengtai yimin, "ecological migrants".

== Responsibility for water supply and sanitation ==
Responsibility for water supply and sanitation policies at the national level is shared between five Ministries. Provincial governments play a relatively limited role in the water sector, providing some limited financing for rural water supply. Local government plays a major role, providing a substantial share of financing and owning water supply and sanitation companies that are the main service providers in urban areas. In smaller towns, local government sometimes provides services directly. Village committees operate water systems in rural areas.

To a large extent, the institutional structure of the sector has been inherited from the period of the planned economy before 1978. There are overlaps in responsibilities between public institutions at the central and local level, as well as between various Ministries. There are also no clear definitions of what terms like "supervision" and "management" that are mentioned in the legislation mean, so that "often the departments in charge cannot tell the differences themselves".

=== Policy and legal framework ===
The national government does not have a single policy document for water supply and sanitation. The two major laws in the water sector relate to water resources management: the Water Law of 2002 and the Water Pollution Prevention and Control Law of 1984.

The legal framework for water supply and sanitation at the national level is constituted by secondary legislation, of which the 1994 regulation of urban water supply, the 1996 administrative measures for the sanitary supervision of drinking water and the 2006 sanitary standards for drinking water are among the most important ones. It is complemented by numerous local regulations and administrative measures.

==== Water supply and sanitation ====
It is the government's policy to fully recover costs for water supply and sanitation through user fees, and that water tariffs should be volumetric. The Ministry of Housing and Urban-Rural Development (until 2008 the Ministry of Construction) oversees financing for urban water and sanitation infrastructure as well as policies concerning the regulation of water and sanitation utilities. Some important policy papers it has issued are "Accelerating the Marketization of Public Utilities" (No.272 Policy Paper of the MOC, 2002), the "Measure on Public Utilities Concession Management" (No.126 Policy Paper of the MOC, 2004), and the "Opinions on Strengthening Regulation of Public Utilities" (No.154 Policy Paper of the MOC, 2005). However, there is no law concerning the regulation of public utilities or private sector participation in the sector. The Ministry of Health has attributions related to the promotion of rural water supply and sanitation.

==== Water resources management ====
The responsibility for water resources management is split between a number of entities at the national and local level. At the national level

- the Ministry of Water Resources is responsible for surface water management, with a focus on quantitative aspects,
- the Ministry of Environmental Protection (formerly the State Environmental Protection Agency, SEPA) has the responsibility to manage the quality of water resources, and
- groundwater falls within the realm of the Ministry of Land and Resources.

Nevertheless, the Ministry of Water Resources and its affiliated river basin commissions in all major river basins are key players in water resources management. The Water Law of 2002 emphasizes demand management and water quality protection and thus paves the way for a transition from a development phase focused almost exclusively on infrastructure development to a phase where more appropriate attention is being devoted to the management and protection of water resources.

In addition to water resources management, the Ministry of Water Resources is also in charge of the construction of some major water infrastructure such as dams, embankments, irrigation infrastructure, and bulk conveyors for municipal and industrial water supply. According to its website, it is also responsible for the "provision of recommendations on economic regulation of water pricing, taxation, credit and financial affairs" as well as "coordination of capital construction of (...) water supply for townships and villages", although in practice these functions seem to be carried out by other entities.

=== Service provision ===
In order to understand the institutional responsibilities for water supply and sanitation in China, it may be helpful to provide a brief overview of the administrative divisions of China:

- 33 province-level (省级; shěngjí) divisions, including 22 provinces, five autonomous regions, four municipalities (Beijing, Shanghai, Tianjin, and Chongqing), and two special administrative regions.
- 333 prefecture-level divisions (地级; dìjí)
- 2872 county-level divisions (县级; xiànjí) (sometimes called "districts")
- 41,636 township-level (乡级; xiāngjí) divisions

For details: Administrative divisions of China

China also has 661 designated cities, which do not constitute separate administrative units. Each municipality, prefecture, and county includes urban and rural areas. 4 cities are capitals of municipalities, 283 cities are capitals of prefectures, and 374 are capitals of counties. In 2005, 340 million people, or about 25% of China's population, lived in designated cities, each of which had a population of at least 200,000. The remaining urban population of about 200 million, or about 15% of the total population, lives in smaller towns that are either among the smaller prefecture-level capitals (96 million) that are not formally designated as cities or in townships (100 million).

In an article on rural China, The Economist magazine wrote that many Chinese experts believe that basic infrastructure should be funded by provinces or the central government: "That done, prefecture and township governments could be massively trimmed or eliminated altogether."

==== Urban areas ====
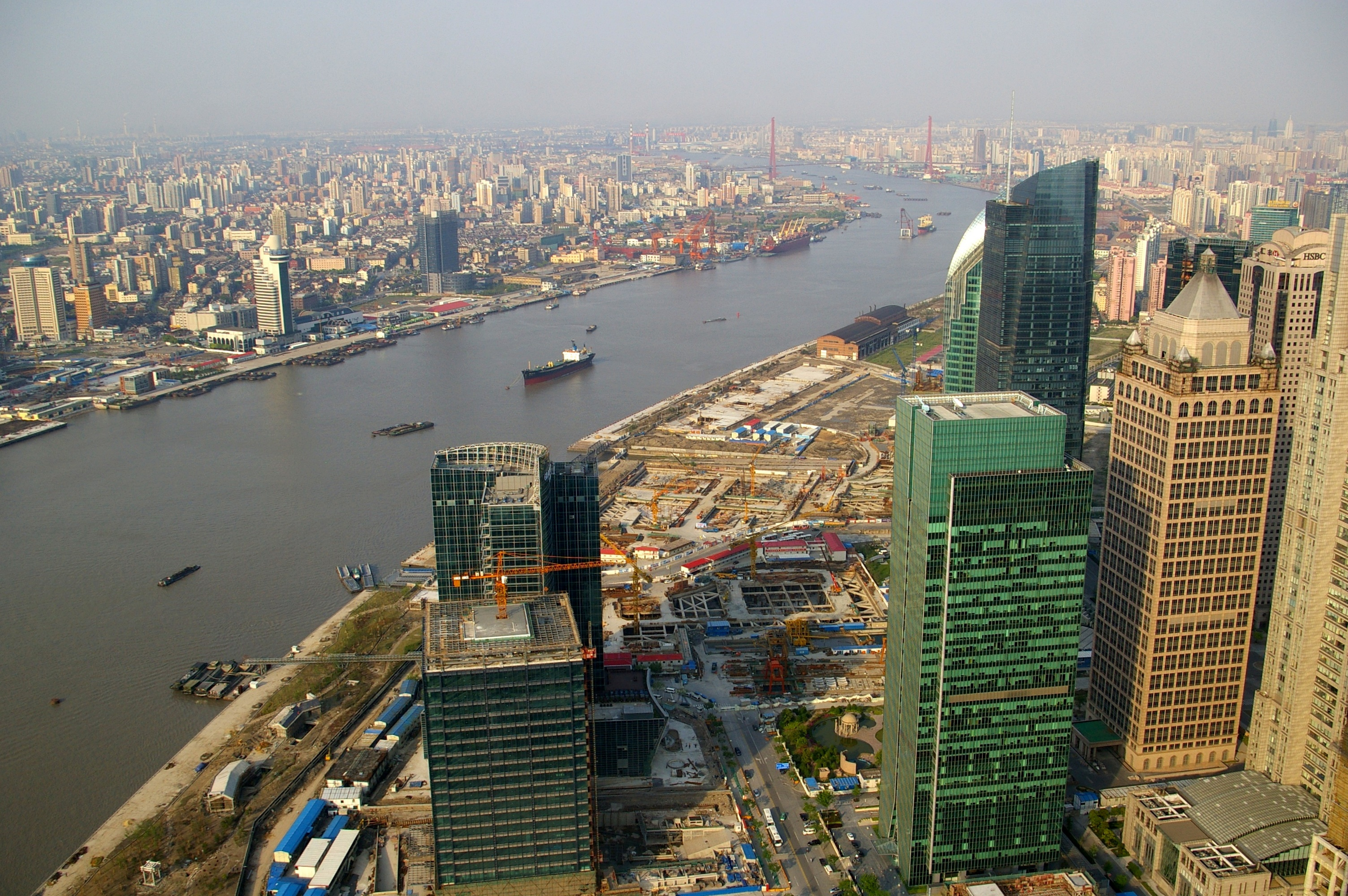
Shanghai, like many other Chinese cities, depends on surface water that is heavily polluted, such as the Huangpu River shown here whose water comes through Suzhou Creek from the heavily polluted Lake Tai.

Overview Urban water supply in China is the responsibility of "cities" under complex arrangements that differ substantially from one city to the other. The term "City" has a dual and confusing meaning in China. It is used here to refer to the main urban area of a municipality, prefecture, or county. Cities are governed by a "leading group" under the leadership of a mayor, who is assisted by various "bureaus", or departments. Services are usually provided by municipally owned water bureaus and wastewater bureaus (sometimes referred to as utilities despite the relatively limited autonomy that these companies enjoy). Water and wastewater bureaus are typically separate from each other. In larger cities, services are further unbundled: There may be a separate raw water bureau that transports water from far-away sources and sells it to the municipal water bureau for distribution. Likewise on the wastewater side, larger cities may have several district drainage bureaus in charge of parts of the city, a wastewater bureau in charge of the main collectors, and a third bureau in charge of wastewater treatment.

In some cities, the various companies are under the same "parent bureau", which may be the construction bureau or a water bureau, while in other cities the water bureau and the wastewater bureau report to different parent bureaus. Especially in smaller cities the county administration provides services directly.

Examples In Shanghai, the Water Division of the Shanghai Urban Construction Investment Development Corporation provides services. The Water Division includes a raw water bureau, five water bureaus, one sewage management bureau, three engineering bureaus and two construction bureaus. It serves 12 million people. In Beijing, a Water parent bureau was established in 2004, integrating the functions of formerly separate bureaus for water supply, sewerage, wastewater treatment, and water resources management. In Tianjin, the Tianjin Water Supply Group provides services. It recently divested itself from numerous side businesses to focus on its core business. Since 1997, it has cooperated with international companies such as Vivendi in a bulk water supply Build-Operate-Transfer (BOT) contract.

==== Private sector participation ====
Private sector participation in financing infrastructure and managing services is widespread. In 2007, there are over 50 water projects and well over 100 wastewater projects in China with private sector participation. The French firm Veolia alone has contracts that involve a total population of over 43 million inhabitants of whom over 27 million are served through full service concessions, among which the concession in Shenzhen is the largest. The company holds manages 22 municipal contracts and nine industrial contracts. the Israeli-Chinese Kardan Water International Group is also a major player in the Chinese water market. Notable Chinese companies engaged in the provision of water supply and sanitation services include the majority state-owned wastewater company Beijing Enterprises Water Group Ltd, China Water Affairs Group, Everbright International (now Everbright Water), and the Beijing-based engineering and construction company Sound Global Limited. An econometric study by Chinese economists on the impact of private sector participation on the performance of urban water supply in 35 major cities over the period 1998 to 2008 found that " the participation of foreign companies, but not domestic private companies, significantly improves water industry performance".

Shenzhen concession. According to a study by the Asian Development Bank, the city of Shenzhen is leading the reform of local water management in China. Inspired by the experience of the water utility in nearby Hong Kong, it was one of the first cities in the country that has combined all water-related government functions into one government agency in 2001. Furthermore, regulatory and operative functions were separated. In 2003, the first concession for municipal public utilities in China was bid out in Shenzhen. The 30-year concession was won by the French firm Veolia and its Chinese partner Capital Water. Together with the State Council Committee for the Regulation and Management of State owned property, which holds 55% of the shares of a newly created Joint Venture called Shenzhen Water, Veolia holds 25% and Capital Water 20% of the shares. The Joint Venture was approved at the national level by the Ministry of Commerce. In 2009, Shenzhen Water was the largest water supply and sanitation enterprise in the country. The wastewater treatment sector in Shenzhen has developed rapidly since the reform of 2001. The sewage treatment rate in the Shenzhen Special Economic Zone has increased from 56% during pre-integration to over 88% in 2008, ranking first among large and medium-sized cities in China. The Asian Development Bank called the Shenzhen case "a model for market-oriented reform in the urban water sector". In 2008 the Shenzhen Water Group had expanded and invested in 17 water projects in 7 provinces. The $40 million equity stake of Veolia is covered by a 15-year MIGA guarantee to protect against the risk of expropriation.

BOT contracts. The most common form of private sector participation in water supply and sanitation in China is through Build-Operate-Transfer (BOT) contracts where the private sector is in charge of large upstream or downstream infrastructure without being directly involved in serving users. Experience with BOT contracts has been mixed. For example, the local government of Lianjiang had the 100,000 m3/day Tangshan water treatment plant built by SUEZ under a BOT contract in 1999. However, the water demand had been grossly overestimated, so that the plant lay idle while the local government had to pay for substantial minimum volumes without using them, which evidently pushed up tariffs. After lengthy negotiations, the local government finally bought back the plant in 2009.

==== Rural areas ====
In rural areas, village committees which are community-based organizations, provide services. Its members operate the systems without remuneration. In terms of rural sanitation, human excreta are systematically used as manure for fertilising crops and vegetables. In many houses, the excreta of all family members are collected in buckets over the course of five to seven days, and then taken to the field and applied raw in the crops. The practice is an age old tradition and of enormous economic value in terms of agricultural production.

==== NGOs ====
There is little information on activities by NGOs in water supply and sanitation in China. An Association for Rural Water Supply and Sanitation provides training, information exchange, technical assistance, and undertakes research. In terms of foreign NGOs, the NGO Plan, for example, works in China. It is known for having introduced for the first time the concept of Community Led Total Sanitation in China in Puchang County in Shaanxi in 2005.

== History and current developments ==
=== Ancient China ===
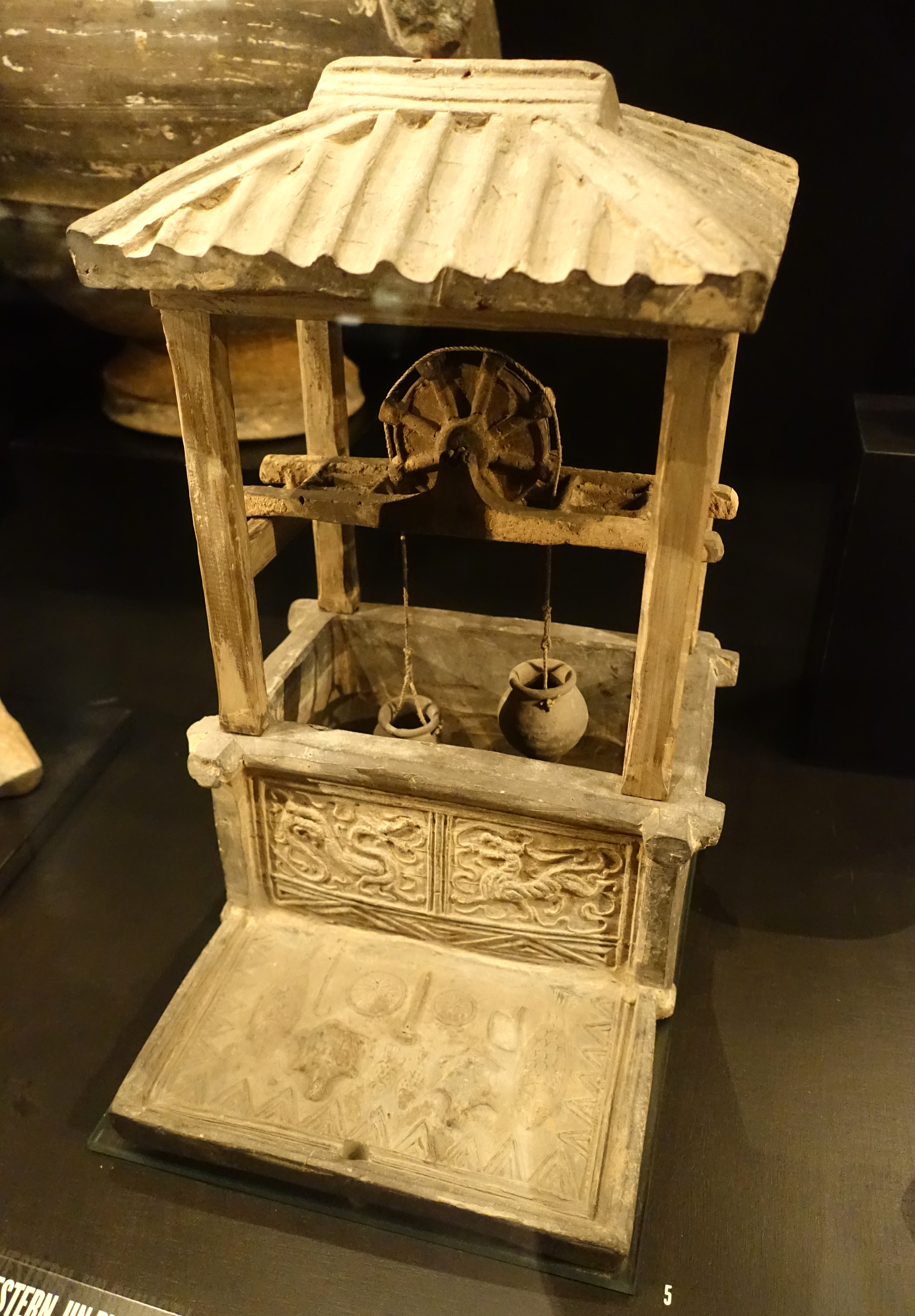
A Chinese ceramic model of a well with a water pulley system, excavated from a tomb of the Han Dynasty (202 BCE – 220 CE) period

Some of the earliest evidence of water wells are located in China. The Neolithic Chinese discovered and made extensive use of deep drilled groundwater for drinking. The Chinese text The Book of Changes, originally a divination text of the Western Zhou dynasty (1046–771 BCE), contains an entry describing how the ancient Chinese maintained their wells and protected their sources of water. Archaeological evidence and old Chinese documents reveal that the prehistoric and ancient Chinese had the aptitude and skills for digging deep water wells for drinking water as early as 6000 to 7000 years ago. A well excavated at the Hemedu excavation site was believed to have been built during the Neolithic era. The well was constructed with four rows of logs with a square frame attached to them at the top of the well. Sixty additional tile wells southwest of Beijing are also believed to have been built around 600 BCE for drinking and irrigation. Plumbing is also known to have been used in East Asia since the Qin and Han Dynasties of China.

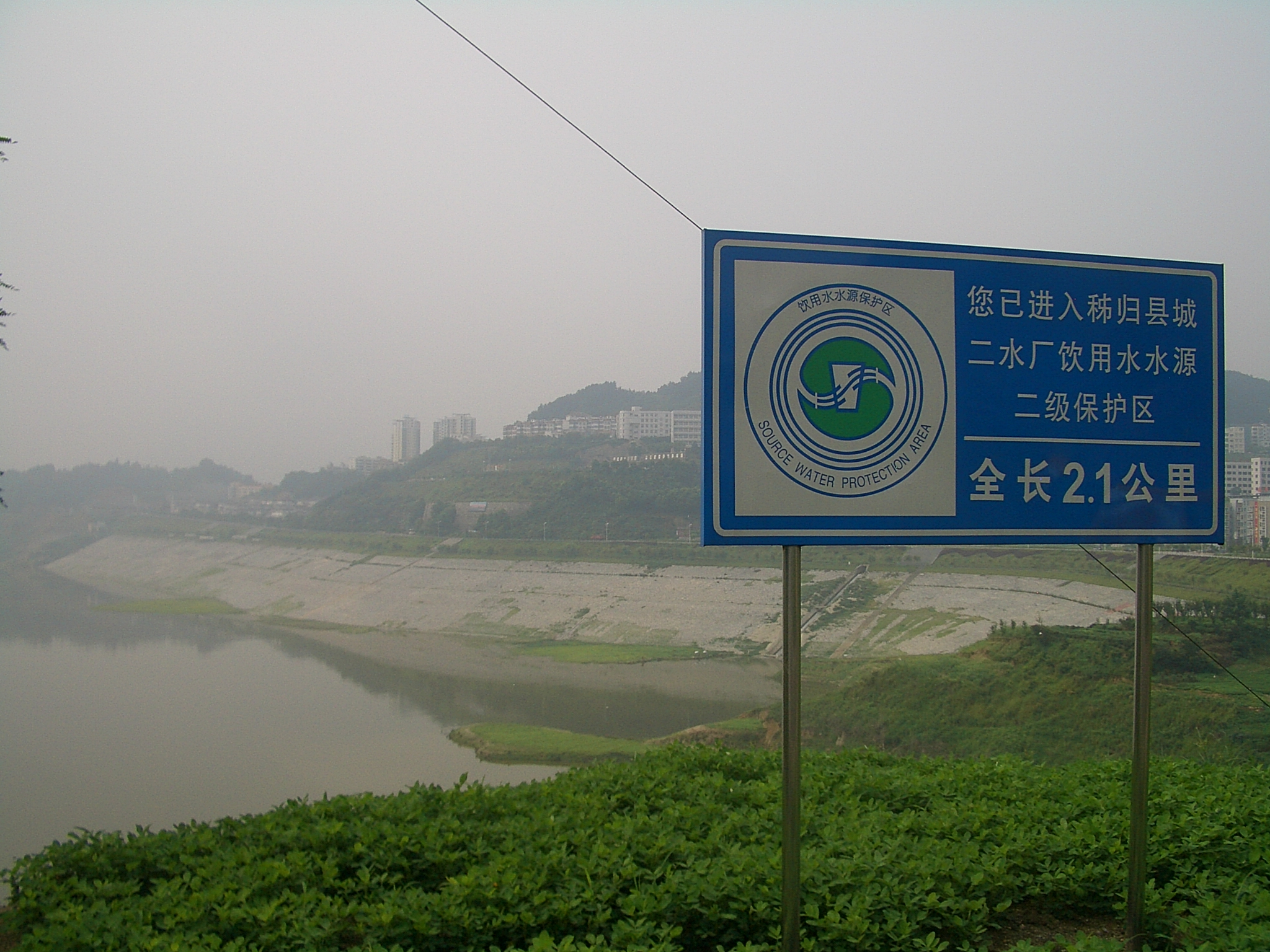
A designated "Source Water Protection Area" on the Three Gorges Reservoir, near Maoping, Hubei

=== Massive investment program for wastewater treatment ===
Over the past 20 years, China has engaged in what is possibly the largest program to build wastewater treatment plants in history. Despite the substantial achievements of this program, many challenges remain.

Achievements Until the early 1980s, there was not a single municipal wastewater treatment plant in China. In that year, the country's first municipal wastewater treatment plant was built in the city of Nanjing. Subsequently, China engaged in what is possibly the largest wastewater treatment investment program in history. It has been estimated that in 2006 there was sufficient capacity to treat 52% of municipal residential wastewater. According to the State Environmental Protection Agency the rate of urban wastewater treatment reached 57% in that year. The government's goal to achieve a level of 60% for treatment of municipal wastewater by 2010 was surpassed. By 2010, 77.5% of domestic waste water was treated. Between 2001 and 2004, the number of cities that charge wastewater tariffs has increased from 300 to 475 out of 661 cities. According to the Notice on the Construction Plan for the Nation's Urban Waste Water Treatment and Recycling Facilities presented in the 12th Five-Year Plan by the General Office of the State Council, which was promulgated on May 4, 2012, the waste water treatment rate in the PRC will further improve by 2015. By the end of 2015, the waste water treatment rate should increase to 100% for municipalities, provincial capital cities and cities specifically designated in the state plan, 85% for other cities, 70% for counties, and 30% for towns.

Remaining challenges However, in the rush to construct planning mistakes were made. Demand was overestimated, the construction of sewerage lagged behind the construction of treatment plants, designs were sometimes inappropriate, there was no requirement for pre-treatment of industrial effluents thus affecting the effectiveness of treatment processes, and the sites chosen for the first priority investments within a river basin were not always those where the highest impact could have been achieved in terms of improving river water quality. As a result, many plants are underutilized or poorly functioning. According to the Ministry of Construction, more than 50 wastewater treatment plants in more than 30 cities operated at only 30 percent of their capacity or did not even come into operation. Consequently, the impact of the investment program on the water quality in rivers and coastal waters has been limited.

During the 1990s, municipal and industrial water use actually declined because of low increases of connection rates to utilities because of underestimation of the importance of small-scale water providers, increased tariffs, increased metering, industrial restructuring, measures to increase the efficiency of water use in industries, as well as due to water scarcity and drought. Many Chinese water and wastewater companies have overcapacities and are in financial difficulties because the revenues are insufficient to cover the servicing of the debt contracted to build the oversized infrastructure.

=== Transition to commercial utilities ===
In 2002, the Ministry of Construction issued a policy paper on the commercialization of public utilities. Subsequently, in October 2003, the central government decided that state-owned enterprises had to be separated from Ministries and/or provincial governments and had to be commercialized. Competitive bidding for contracts, private sector participation and commercial financing are important element in the transition to a market economy. In the 1990s, the first BOT contracts were signed for wastewater treatment plants. More than 200 wastewater treatment plants were built with some form of private sector participation in their financing and/or management, usually using the BOT formula. Early BOTs saw governments implementing the process without the benefit of financial, legal, and technical advisers, finding to their chagrin that the process becomes more complex in the absence of expert knowledge. Learning from the experience of past BOTs in the sector, local governments sought expert advice on bidding and public tender. In about 2000 for the first time, a BOT water project (Chengdu No. 6 Water Supply Plant) was awarded on the basis of transparent international competitive bidding, with support from the ADB. In 2004, a landmark international competitive bid for the entire water supply and sanitation system of Shenzhen was won by a joint venture including the French firm Veolia.

In addition to its formal recycling industry, the informal economy recycling industry includes an estimated 2 million to 5 million people who collect and receive payment for recyclables, especially cardboard.

As of 2020, forty-six major cities in China had implemented "smart" waste sorting systems, including efforts such as trash-bag QR codes.

== Efficiency ==
There are many different indicators for utility efficiency. In the case of China, some indicators, such as labor productivity, suggest a low level of operational efficiency, while other indicators - such as non-revenue water - suggest a high level of operational efficiency.

Labor productivity Most water and sanitation utilities in China have a low labor productivity and are overstaffed. For example, many utilities in small towns in Henan province have more than 20 employees per 1,000 connections, while international good practice is less than 4 employees per 1,000 connections. In Chengdu, the utility employed 34 employees per 1,000 connections, while in Shanghai, the ratio was less than 6 employees per 1,000 connections.

Non-revenue water Non-revenue water (NRW) - consisting mainly leakage losses in the distribution network - are estimated by the Chinese Waterworks Association to be only 20% on average and less than 10% for the best utilities, which is very low by international standards. The International Benchmarking Network for Water and Sanitation Utilities estimated the non-revenue water for a sample of Chinese water utilities at 27% in 2006 and 21% in 2001.

One explanation for the relatively low level of NRW may be that most Chinese live in dense apartment complexes, which results in compact distribution systems. In some smaller cities, non-revenue water remains relatively high. For example, average non revenue water in small towns in Henan province is 38%.

== Tariffs and cost recovery ==
Cost recovery for water and sanitation services paradoxically is lower in urban areas, while it is higher in rural areas, despite the lower incomes of rural residents.

=== Urban areas ===
Overview Many urban water and wastewater utilities in China experience financial stress, because user fees are set well below cost recovery levels and government subsidies are insufficient to cover the resulting gap. In 2004, 60% of urban water utilities reported negative net incomes. The financial situation of wastewater utilities is expected to be even more precarious. Tariffs have increased by 50% since 1998 and now stand at 1.5 RMB/m3 or US$0.20/m3 in 2021. These rates are insufficient to cover costs.

Until the 1980s, urban water tariffs in China were very low and sewer tariffs were practically unknown. This has changed substantially since the adoption of National Guidelines on Urban Water Tariffs in 1988, which called for increased cost recovery and for the introduction of sewer tariffs. Subsequently, water tariffs have been increased substantially in many Chinese cities, particularly in the north where water is scarcest. However, according to the Ministry of Construction, water tariff reforms have not been effective enough to offer the necessary incentives to save water. While many cities now have sewer tariffs, in 2005, there were more than 150 cities across the country where no wastewater treatment fee was collected.

China has a policy of universal metering, including metering of individual households in apartment complexes, where most urban residents live. Metering in urban areas is now relatively widespread with an average of 90% connections being metered. Some cities are experimenting with pre-paid debit cards that residents must put into their meters in order to receive service.

Tariff structure are complex, with different tariffs for different categories of users and higher tariffs charged to industrial and commercial users than to residential users. Most water tariffs are linear, i.e. there is a single price per unit of water, although there are some increasing-block tariffs where the unit price increases with consumption. Urban tariffs are approved by Price Bureaus of cities, after considerable prior negotiation. Tariffs do not require approval from a higher level of government.

Examples In Tianjin, where water tariffs had not been raised once between 1949 and 1985, they have been raised eight times until 2006. As a result, cost recovery has improved significantly. In Chengdu the average water tariff was US$0.14/m3 in 2001. Despite the relatively low water tariff the utility's revenues were twice as high as recurrent costs, allowing for a significant share of self-financing. In Shanghai, the average water tariff was only US$0.10/m3 in 2001. The utility did not even recover its recurrent cost and had an operating loss.

=== Rural areas ===
In rural areas, according to the World Bank users pay about 75% of investment costs and 100% of operation and maintenance costs. Rural tariffs do not need to be approved.

== Investment and financing ==
=== Investment level and breakdown ===
Investments in the sector have than tripled over the past years. According to the World Bank, in 1991–2005, a total of US$54 billion was invested in urban water supply and sanitation, equivalent to only US$3.7 billion per year. During the 11th Five Year Plan in 2006–10, almost US$11 billion per year are expected to be invested in the sector, thus investing in five years as much as had been invested in the previous fifteen years. More than 60% of these investments are targeted at sanitation, reflecting the backlog in that sector. Figures for rural areas are not available.

=== Financing ===
Urban areas The World Bank estimates that urban water and wastewater infrastructure in China has been financed from the following sources in 1991–2005:

{ ! Wastewater |- | Municipal governments | 20-30% | 40-50% |- | Domestic banks | 20-30% | 10-20% |- | State bond program | 10-20% | 20-30% |- | Private sector | 10-20% | 10-20% |- | China Development Bank | 10% | 5% |- | International Financial Institutions | 5% | 10% |}

Source: World Bank:Stepping up - Improving the performance of China's urban water utilities, by Greg Browder et al., 2007, p. 108

Municipal governments provide their financing in the form of equity that typically is not remunerated. The other forms of financing require a remuneration either in the form of interests on loans or profits on private equity. Local governments in China are not allowed to borrow directly. Municipally owned utility companies, however, are allowed to borrow from the China Development Bank, other Chinese banks, the state bond program and international financial institutions. The State bond program is geared at less economically developed regions. The bonds are issued by the Ministry of Finance, and then distributed by the National Development and Reform Commission as long maturity, low-interest loans, which in some cases may be converted to grants. The major international financial institutions engaged in the sector are the World Bank and the Asian Development Bank, complemented by bilateral donors such as the Japan International Cooperation Agency (JICA) and the German KfW.

Implicitly, according to this estimate, the level of self-financing by water and wastewater utilities is zero. Nevertheless, there clearly will be an upward pressure on tariffs, since 70-80% of water infrastructure and 50-60% of wastewater infrastructure is financed either through debt or private equity that requires a remuneration. The remainder is financed through municipal equity, which typically requires no remuneration and thus helps to keep tariffs low.

Another mechanism to use debt finance are BOTs which are a popular financing mechanism for water and wastewater treatment plants and bulk water supply systems in China. Under BOTs, private entities undertake investments and recover their costs through fees for bulk water sale or wastewater treatment charged to the utilities. While the local government or utilities are formally not indebted through a BOT, the charges for the services are de facto similar to debt service charges.

Rural areas In terms of rural and small town infrastructure, channeling funds to the final users through the various layers of local government remains a challenge. According to the World Bank, China differs from many other developing countries in that there is not a history of the central government providing large subsidies for the financing of rural water supply and sanitation. Instead, there is greater emphasis on self-reliance with rural people using their own contributions and resources to improve their water supply. This financing structure causes poor rural areas to "accurately match their ability to pay with the proper type of systems and level of service", i.e. to choose sanitation solutions that they can afford. According to the World Bank, as a result, "China is held up as a model for other developing countries". Support for capital costs for water supply is partially provided by the local and/or provincial government. Beneficiaries have to provide upfront capital contributions. Through World Bank financing and central government counterpart financing these upfront capital contributions were reduced, thus making sanitation more affordable to the poor. According to The Economist magazine, "some provinces are now bypassing both the prefectural- and township-level governments in order to get funds more directly to rural areas."

== See also ==
- Water resources of China
- Water supply in Hong Kong
- China Water Affairs Group
- Water scarcity
- Atmospheric water generator
- Desalination
