= David Ho (businessman) =

Hong Kong Canadian entrepreneur

- Born: 1952 or 1953 (age 73–74) (Note: Ho was 58 years old as of June 22, 2011.); British Hong Kong
- Occupation: businessman
- Known for: Harmony Airways
- Relatives: Charles Ho (brother); Ho Ying-chie (grandfather)

David Ho Ting-kwok (born 1952 or 1953) is a Vancouver-based Canadian entrepreneur originally from Hong Kong. He founded the now-defunct Harmony Airways, and owns the University Golf Club (course land owned and leased from Musqueam Capital Corporation). He has a minority interest in MCL Motors (founded 1992) since selling it to Dilawri Automotive Group in 2010. In 2005 he was named the Businessman of the Year by the Vancouver Junior Board of Trade. Ho is a former member of the Vancouver Police Board.

In 2009, Ho was charged with unlawful confinement, cocaine possession and possession of an unregistered firearm in relation to an incident involving a prostitute. On 2 February 2012, he pleaded guilty to a charge of unlawful confinement and was given a one-year suspended sentence, 45 hours of community service and a $5,000 fine.

Ho and his family have been frequent donors to various charities, especially Orbis International.

Ho's name was found in the Panama Papers involving his registration of Harmonyworld Investment Company by Mossack Foncesa.

== Background ==
Ho's grandfather, Ho Ying-chie, owned the Hong Kong Tobacco Co., the eighth-largest tobacco company worldwide. Sing Tao News Corporation Limited chairman Charles Ho is his brother.

Ho attended Woodberry Forest School in Virginia, and then studied business at the University of Richmond. Ho, and his then-wife Rita Fung (sister of Fairchild Group CEO Thomas Fung and daughter of Fung King Hey, co-founder of Sun Hung Kai & Co. of Hong Kong), arrived in Canada in 1984 because she had family in the Vancouver area. The couple divorced in 1995. Ho later married Winnie Schweitzer, who along with Ho are directors in Seychelles registered Harmonyworld Investments.

== See also ==
- Chinese Canadians in British Columbia
