= SHK =

SHK might refer to:

- Schempp-Hirth SHK aerobatic glider
- Speaker of the House of Keys of Isle of Man
- Sun Hung Kai (disambiguation), groups of property and finance companies in Hong Kong
- Swedish Accident Investigation Authority (Statens Haverikommission)
- Stichodactyla toxin, a toxin from a sea anemone
- The Pentecostal Church of Finland (Suomen Helluntaikirkko)
- Sandnes Håndballklubb, team handball club from Sandnes, Norway
