= Li Xiaopeng (banker) =

Chinese banker and politician

- 李晓鹏

Chairman of China Everbright Group Co., Ltd.
- In office December 2017 – March 2022
- Preceded by: Tang Shuangning
- Succeeded by: Wang Jiang

Personal details
- Born: May 1959 (age 67) Henan, China
- Party: Chinese Communist Party (expelled)
- Education: Wuhan University

Chinese name
- Simplified Chinese: 李晓鹏
- Traditional Chinese: 李曉鵬
Transcriptions
Standard Mandarin
- Hanyu Pinyin: Lǐ Xiǎopéng

Li Xiaopeng (Chinese: 李晓鹏; born May 1959) is a former Chinese banker and politician who served as party secretary and chairman of China Everbright Group Co., Ltd. He was investigated by China's top anti-graft agency in April 2023.

He was a member of the 13th National Committee of the Chinese People's Political Consultative Conference.

== Early life and education ==
Born in Henan in May 1959, Li graduated from Wuhan University, with a PhD in economics.

== Career ==
Li worked at Industrial and Commercial Bank of China, and finally became executive director in October 2010. He also worked at China Huarong Asset Management. He became chairman of the supervisory board of China Investment Corporation in May 2013 and subsequently general manager of China Merchants Group in July 2014. In December 2017, he succeeded Tang Shuangning as party secretary and chairman of China Everbright Group Co., Ltd., serving in the post until his retirement in March 2022.

== Downfall ==
On 5 April 2023, he was suspected of "serious violations of laws and regulations" by the Central Commission for Discipline Inspection (CCDI), the party's internal disciplinary body, and the National Supervisory Commission, the highest anti-corruption agency of China. On October 9, he was expelled from the CCP and removed from public office. On October 12, he was detained by the Supreme People's Procuratorate. On October 28, he stood trial for bribery at the Intermediate People's Court of Daqing, prosecutors accused him of taking advantage of his different positions between 1994 and 2021 to seek profits for various companies and individuals in corporate financing, loan credit, business contracting, and employee recruitment, in return, he accepted money and gifts worth more than 60.43 million yuan ($8.426 million) either directly or from other connections.

On 18 March 2025, Li was eventually sentenced to a 15-year jail and fined 6 million yuan for taking bribes, all property gained from the bribery would be turned over to the national treasury.

Business positions
New title	General Manager of China Merchants Group; 2014–2017	Succeeded by Fu Gangfeng (付刚峰)
Preceded by Tang Shuangning	Chairman of China Everbright Group Co., Ltd. 2017–2022	Succeeded by Wang Jiang
