= Sun Hung Kai =

Sun Hung Kai may refer to:

- Sun Hung Kai Enterprises, a defunct private company founded in 1963, the predecessor of all namesake
- Sun Hung Kai Properties, commonly known as Sun Hung Kai, a listed conglomerate (in real estate, telecommunications, public transport, etc.) based in Hong Kong, ticker symbol SEHK:00016
  - Sun Hung Kai Centre, skyscraper on Hong Kong Island
- Sun Hung Kai & Co., listed non-bank financial corporation in Hong Kong, ticker symbol SEHK:00086
- Sun Hung Kai Bank, a defunct bank in Hong Kong, now Fubon Bank (Hong Kong)
