= Kong Dan =

Chinese businessman and economist

Kong Dan (Simplified Chinese: 孔丹) (born 1947 in Beijing, China with family roots in Pingxiang, Jiangxi, China) is a Chinese entrepreneur and economist. He is the chairman of the CITIC Group. He is also the chairman of CITIC International Financial Holdings, China CITIC Bank and CITIC Resources Holdings.

Kong was the vice-chairman and president of China Everbright Group, vice-chairman of China Everbright Limited and chairman of China Everbright Technology Limited. He has become the CITIC's chairman since 2006.

Both Kong's father and mother were high level Chinese Communist Party officials. He was known to be a leader of the original Red Guard group formed at the beginning of the Cultural Revolution.

== Education ==
He holds a Master's Degree in Economics from the Chinese Academy of Social Sciences.
