= Ho Ying-chie =

Hong Kong businessman

- Born: June 8, 1911; Shanghai
- Died: January 21, 2000 (aged 88); Hong Kong
- Occupation: businessman
- Years active: 1931-2000
- Known for: Hong Kong Tobacco

Ho Ying-chie (traditional Chinese: 何英傑; simplified Chinese: 何英杰, 8 June 1911 – 21 January 2000) was a Hong Kong businessman and philanthropist. He made a fortune as chairman of Hong Kong Tobacco.

Born in 1911 in Pudong, Shanghai, Ho started his education at nine years old but left school at 14 years old to become an apprentice at the family's printing factory. Within two years, Ho mastered the skills of printing and become the manager of the factory.

In 1931, at the age of 20, Ho set up a printing factory. During the outbreak of Second Sino-Japanese War in 1937, there was a lack of workers so Ho personally led the operations at his factory, making it the only printing factory operational in Shanghai. This led to a profitable business within weeks and Ho invested in printing paper which was in demand and prices surge during the war. In 1942, Ho started a tobacco company in Shanghai. His brand of tobacco proved to be popular. After the war, Ho started Hong Kong Tobacco at Hong Kong in 1949.

At the age of 20, and invested the profits in a tobacco business. He reportedly abandoned this operation in 1948 and emigrated to Hong Kong.

In 1962, three directors and the chief accountant of Hong Kong Tobacco were charged with tax evasion. Ho Ying-chie was charged with assisting the company to evade profit tax and keeping falsified records. Ho's son, Ho Kwan-king, was also charged. On 15 February 1962, the four pleaded guilty in Victoria District Court. Ho was sentenced to a fine of HK$10,000.

He supported various charitable causes including Project Orbis. In July 1996, Ho donated HK$100 million to aid flood victims in China.

Ho died on 21 January 2000 at the Hong Kong Sanatorium. His body was flown to the United States for burial in Hartsdale, New York.

== Family ==
Ho married when he was 18.

Ho's grandchildren include Charles Ho (born 1949) and Canadian based David Ho (born 1953).
