= Charles Ho =

Hong Kong businessman (1949–2025)

The Honourable Charles Ho Tsu-kwok GBM
- 何柱國
- Born: 23 June 1949; Hong Kong
- Died: 12 June 2025 (aged 75)
- Occupation: Businessman
- Known for: Chairman of Sing Tao News Corporation Limited (2001–2021)

Charles Ho
- Traditional Chinese: 何柱國
- Simplified Chinese: 何柱国
Transcriptions

Charles Ho Tsu-kwok, GBM (Chinese: 何柱國; 23 June 1949 – 12 June 2025) was a Hong Kong businessman who was the chairman of the Sing Tao News Corporation Limited between 2001 and 2021 and an independent non-executive director of Shun Tak Holdings. As a member of the pro-Beijing camp, Ho maintained good relations with the Chinese government, and was appointed a National Committee Member of the Chinese People's Political Consultative Conference representing Fujian, serving in that post since 1998. Ho was awarded the Grand Bauhinia Medal, the highest award under the Hong Kong honours and awards system by Chief Executive CY Leung on 1 July 2014, although the decision to award Ho with such an award sparked controversy in the Hong Kong media.

== Early life ==
Ho was born in Hong Kong on 23 June 1949. He had family roots in Fujian. He was the grandson of Ho Ying-chie, the founder and owner of the Hong Kong Tobacco Company Limited, and the brother of David Ho, a Vancouver-based entrepreneur. Ho founded the Sing Tao Newspaper Group Limited in 2001.

== Events ==
=== Relation with CY Leung ===
On 9 December 2011, Ho, an outspoken supporter of Chief Executive Election candidate Henry Tang, publicly challenged Tang's opponent CY Leung in a press conference, questioning his ability to handle the top job in Hong Kong. Ho noted that one of Leung's companies, DTZ Holdings, had the values of its shares decreased to zero and declared bankruptcy, and thus fearing that "Hong Kong's economy would become zero because of Leung's wrong decisions".

However, in an interview on 30 August 2014, Ho withdrew his accusation towards CY Leung by praising Leung's efforts in improving people's livelihood, saying that Leung's decisions "hasn't made Hong Kong's economy become zero yet".

=== Awarded the Grand Bauhinia Medal ===
On 1 July 2014, Ho was awarded the Grand Bauhinia Medal, the highest award under the Hong Kong honours and awards system by Chief Executive CY Leung for his "distinguished service to the community, particularly his contribution to the media industry." The decision to award Ho the highest honour sparked dismay among some Hong Kong media. Ho is originally considered a staunch supporter Henry Tang, CY Leung's major opponent in the 2012 Chief Executive Election. However, he switched sides and praised Leung as a competent leader immediately after he was elected, and thereafter was a staunch supporter of CY Leung's government. Some media expressed opinions that Ho did not deserve the award, as they believed only "true heroes" should be honoured instead of a "yes man" like Ho.

=== Objections to "Civil Nomination" ===
In an interview on 30 August 2014, Ho commented on the civil nomination proposal demanded by members of the pro-democracy camp for the 2017 Chief Executive election, saying that there is no such thing as a "civil nomination" in any political system worldwide, and that he feared that the adoption of a "civil nomination" for Chief Executive may ultimately result in triads nominated for the post.

=== Reported entry denied to US ===
In early December 2019, there were unconfirmed reports that Ho was denied entry to the United States after the passing of the Hong Kong Human Rights and Democracy Act. Ho denied the rumour and sued an online media for libel.

=== Politics ===
In December 2021, it was reported that Ho was eligible to vote four times in the 2021 Hong Kong legislative election, yielding 0.0334058% of the total voting value (elected seats), which is 6721 times more than the value of an average voter's total voting value.

== Personal life and death ==
Ho studied at Diocesan Boys' School in the early parts of his life before moving to the US to pursue higher studies. He returned to Hong Kong to assume the leadership of his father's company.

Ho disclosed information on his lung cancer diagnosis in February 2025. After receiving treatment in Hong Kong, he made a successful recovery and voiced his conviction about the right to smoke freely.

Ho died from complications of influenza on 12 June 2025, at the age of 75.

== Awards ==
- 2014: Grand Bauhinia Medal
