= China Everbright Limited =

Hong Kong financial services company

- Type: Public; state-owned enterprise
- Traded as: SEHK: 165
- Industry: Financial services
- Predecessor: IHD Holdings
- Founded: 1 November 1994 (as Everbright-IHD)
- Founder: China Everbright Group
- Headquarters: Hong Kong S.A.R., China
- Area served: Mainland China, Hong Kong
- Key people: Tang Shuangning (Chairman); Chen Shuang (CEO)
- Services: Asset management
- Owner: China Everbright Holdings (49.74%)
- Website: www.everbright165.com.hk
- Footnotes in a consolidated basis

China Everbright Limited
- Simplified Chinese: 中国光大控股有限公司
- Traditional Chinese: 中國光大控股有限公司
- Literal meaning: China Everbright Holding Limited Company
Transcriptions
Standard Mandarin
- Hanyu Pinyin: Zhōngguó guāngdà kònggǔ yǒuxiàn gōngsī

China Everbright Limited is a Hong Kong-based financial services company in asset management, investment and merchant bank in the Greater China region, including mainland China and Hong Kong. It is part of the China Everbright Group, a state-owned enterprise operated under the supervision of the State Council of the People's Republic of China (via Central Huijin Investment and the Ministry of Finance).

China Everbright Limited is considered a red chip stock on the Hong Kong Stock Exchange.

== History ==
The predecessor of the company was founded on 25 August 1972 in Hong Kong as Intercontinental Housing Development Limited, renamed IHD Holdings in 1987. In 1994 it was taken over by China Everbright Group and renamed China Everbright-IHD Pacific Limited. On 18 July 1997, the business inherited from IHD was ended, the company was renamed China Everbright Limited, the current name. On the same day, a 20% stake of China Everbright Bank was injected from the parent company, China Everbright Group, followed by International Bank of Asia on 2 August. On 18 July 1999, Everbright Limited acquired a 49% stake of Everbright Securities from the parent company.

In 2002, a 35% stake of Standard Life (Asia) Limited was sold to Standard Life. In 2003, SeaBright Asset Management Limited was founded, a joint venture with Seagate Global Advisors (Chinese: 海基資產管理有限公司). In 2000s Everbright Limited acted as a sponsor in number of firm listings in Hong Kong Stock Exchange, for example, Zijin Mining in 2003.

In 2011, a 51% stake of Everbright Securities (International) was sold to Everbright Securities, Everbright Limited remained a minority shareholder of Everbright Securities, while Everbright Group is the largest shareholder.

In 2016, the company acquired the concession of Tirana International Airport, which runs until 2027. The company was the largest shareholder of China Aircraft Leasing Group Holdings.

China Everbright Group has been involved in numerous scandals lately, including a Ponzi scheme exposed in 2024. It used a company under its control to set up a Ponzi scheme to swindle hundreds of investors over $500m. The case is under investigation by the Beijing Public Security Bureau. The victims continue to protest outside Chine Everbright's headquarters demanding to speak with the company's high ranking officials. However, instead of addressing the victims appeals, the company has resorted to harassing the protestors.
