= Harmony Airways =

Airline of Canada (2002–2007)

IATA	ICAO	Call sign
HQ	HMY	HARMONY
- Founded: February 2002 (as HMY Airways)
- Commenced operations: November 2002 (as HMY Airways); May 2004 (as Harmony Airways)
- Ceased operations: April 9, 2007
- Operating bases: Vancouver International Airport
- Fleet size: 4
- Destinations: 15
- Parent company: HMY Airways Inc.
- Headquarters: Vancouver, British Columbia, Canada
- Founder: David Ting Kwok Ho
- Website: harmonyairways.com

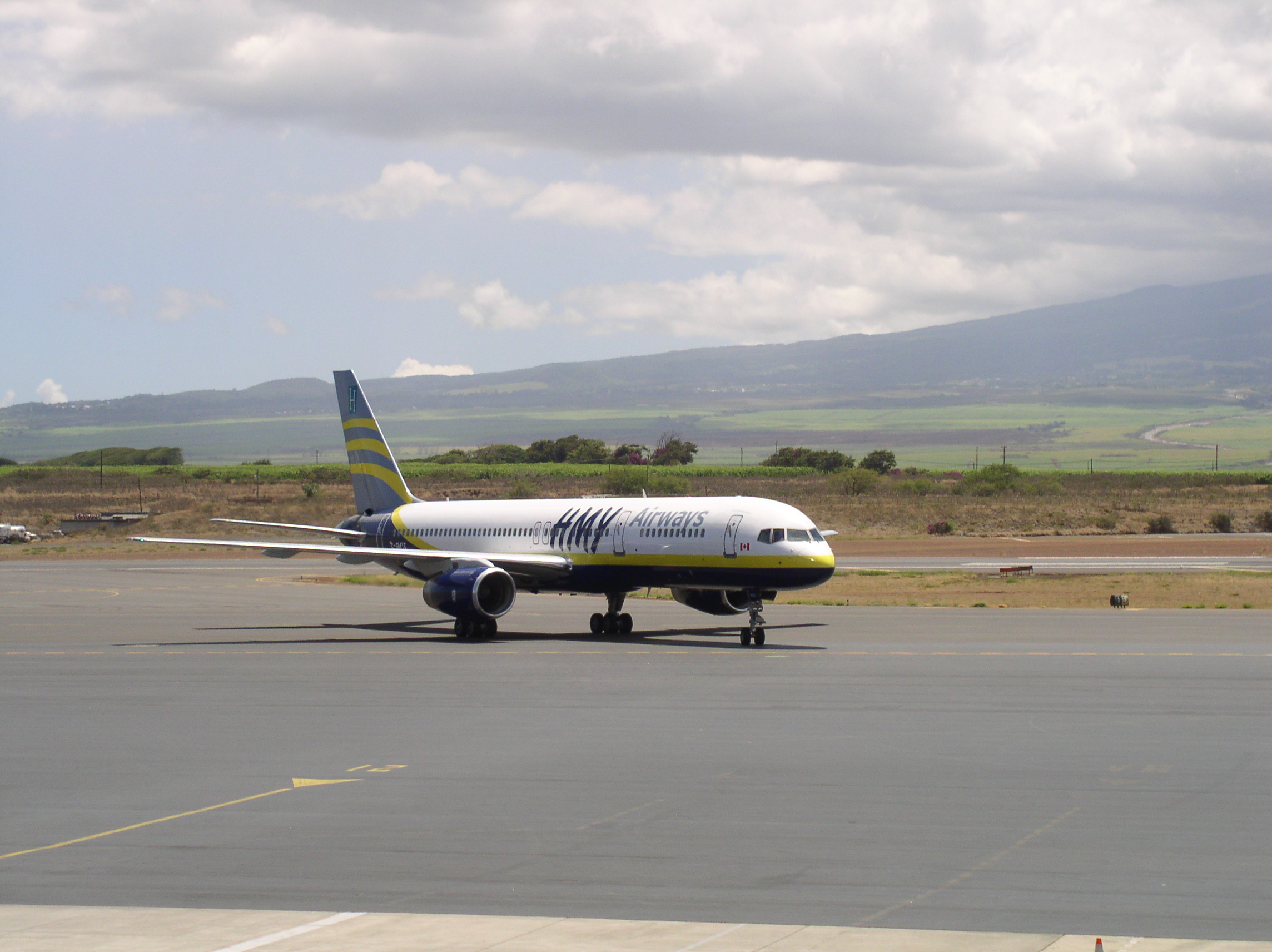
A Harmony Boeing 757-200 in the original HMY Airways livery.

Harmony Airways was a Canadian airline headquartered in Richmond, British Columbia, a suburb of Vancouver. It operated flights from Canada to California, Hawaii, New York City, Mexico and Las Vegas as well as scheduled passenger service domestically within Canada. Its main base was Vancouver International Airport (YVR).

== History ==
The airline was officially announced as HMY Airways (an abbreviation for Harmony) by David Ting Kwok Ho in February 2002. After acquiring two Boeing 757-200 jetliners in September and November 2002, the airline's inaugural flight flew from Vancouver in November 2002. The airline was wholly owned by David Ting Kwok Ho.

Throughout the mid-2000s, the airline steadily expanded, first within Canada, but it soon expanded to Hawaii and to destinations in the western USA. Future plans included expanding into China, but those plans were never realized. The airline was renamed Harmony Airways in May 2004.

Harmony's telephone reservations were contracted to a dedicated call centre team at Vantis Corporation in Calgary, Alberta (later briefly renamed Vantis-TravelCLICK before closing down Calgary operations in October 2006). Vantis (previously known as VIP) was a third-party call centre based in Calgary before being acquired by TravelCLICK in October 2005, then having operations moved to Jamaica in October 2006. Harmony's call centre contract with Vantis-TravelCLICK ended after Harmony ceased operations in 2007.

According to its 2004-2005 route map and timetable, Harmony was operating scheduled nonstop Boeing 757 passenger jet service between Vancouver (YVR) and Toronto (YYZ), Honolulu (HNL), Maui (OGG), Los Angeles (LAX) and Las Vegas (LAS) as well as nonstop Boeing 757 passenger flights between Victoria, BC (YYJ) and Honolulu (HNL) at this time.

In 2006, the airline then expanded its service between western Canada and Hawaii with nonstop Boeing 757 flights between Honolulu (HNL) and Calgary (YYC), Edmonton (YEG) and Kelowna (YLW) in addition to continuing to operate nonstop service between Honolulu (HNL) and Vancouver (YVR) and Victoria (YYJ), and was also operating nonstop 757 service between Maui (OGG) and Calgary (YYC) and Edmonton (YEG) in addition to continuing to operate nonstops between Maui (OGG) and Vancouver (YVR) at this time.

From June 2006 to October 2006, Harmony Airways leased a Bombardier CRJ-100 to operate the Vancouver - Calgary route. The aircraft was configured in a single-class 50-seat configuration, and was painted in a hybrid, United Express - Harmony Airways livery.

On March 27, 2007, Harmony Airways announced that it had issued layoff notices to all staff, and that it was ending scheduled flight service on April 9, 2007, due to increasing fuel costs and having a hard time attracting full-service passengers amid low-cost competition, such as WestJet. Harmony also had a hard time attracting profitable business travelers, due to a lack of a frequent flier program and lacking services to popular business destinations.

== Destinations ==
As of October 2006, Harmony Airways operated services to the following destinations:

=== Canada ===
- Alberta
  - Calgary – Calgary International Airport
  - Edmonton – Edmonton International Airport (Seasonal)
- British Columbia
  - Abbotsford – Abbotsford International Airport
  - Kelowna – Kelowna International Airport (Seasonal)
  - Vancouver – Vancouver International Airport (Base)
  - Victoria – Victoria International Airport (Seasonal)
- Ontario
  - Toronto – Toronto Pearson International Airport

=== United States ===
- California
  - Los Angeles – Los Angeles International Airport
  - Oakland – Oakland International Airport
  - Palm Springs – Palm Springs International Airport
- Hawaii
  - Hilo – Hilo International Airport
  - Honolulu – Daniel K. Inouye International Airport
  - Maui – Kahului Airport
- Nevada
  - Las Vegas – Harry Reid International Airport
- New York
  - New York City – John F. Kennedy International Airport

== Fleet ==
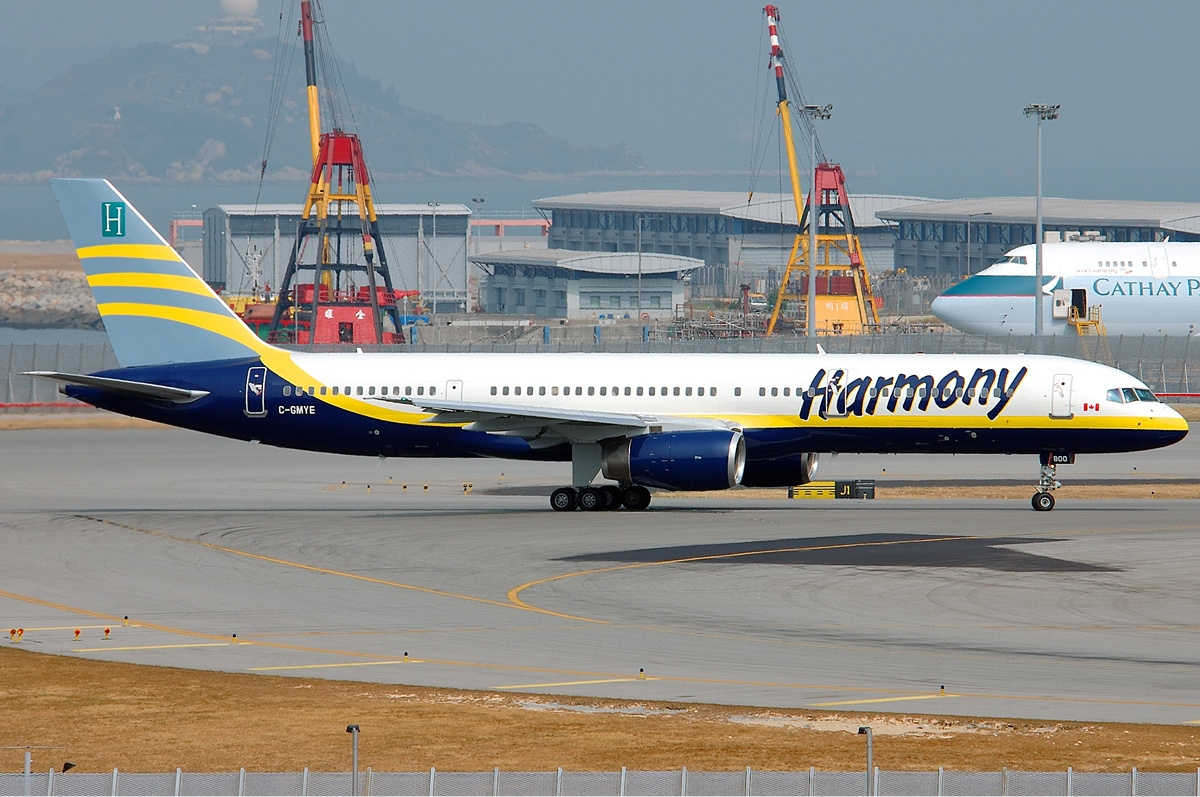
A Harmony Airways Boeing 757-200 in the Harmony Airways livery.

The Harmony Airways fleet consisted of Boeing 757-200 aircraft. For a short period of time in 2006, Harmony Airways operated a Bombardier CRJ-100 aircraft on its Vancouver - Calgary route.

Harmony Airways fleet
Aircraft	Number	Passengers			Notes
Aircraft	Number	B	E	Total	Notes
Boeing 757-200	5	16	155	171	1 left the fleet in 2004
Bombardier CRJ-100	1	0	50	50	Operated from June 2006 - October 2006 on Vancouver-Calgary route

As of March 2007 the Harmony Airways fleet included four Boeing 757-200 aircraft. On March 22, 2007, the National Post reported that Harmony Airways would reduce its fleet to three 757s. In the summer of 2007, British engine manufacturer Rolls-Royce purchased two of Harmony's 757s in order to harvest the plane's RB211-535 engines to support other customers' engine needs. Rolls-Royce then sold the remaining aircraft hulls to an American salvage company.

== Services ==
Harmony Airways offered two classes of service on their Boeing 757-200 aircraft (the Bombardier CRJ-100 was single-class): Business and Economy class. Both classes were advertised as being full-service compared to WestJet and other low-cost alternatives.

=== Business class ===
Available on Boeing 757-200 aircraft, Business class was Harmony's flagship product. Business class was sometimes marketed as harmonyone. Seats had a pitch of 52 inches, and a width of 22 inches. Passengers were given personal AVOD (Audio Video On Demand) systems to use during the flight. Amenity kits were also provided.

=== Economy Class ===
Harmony Airways promoted their economy class as higher quality than other airlines, stating "We really shouldn't even use the word economy". Seats had a pitch of 810 mm (32 in). Harmony gave out free headphones in Economy class that passengers could keep, to use with the Inflight entertainment. Complimentary hot meals were served on longer routes.

== See also ==
- List of defunct airlines of Canada
