= Fung King-hey =

Hong Kong businessman (1922–1985)

- Born: 馮景禧; 1922; Guangzhou, China
- Died: 1985 (aged 62–63)
- Known for: Sun Hung Kai & Co. (co-founder)
- Children: Thomas Fung Wing Fat; Tony Fung Wing-cheung

Chinese name
- Traditional Chinese: 馮景禧
- Simplified Chinese: 冯景禧
- Jyutping: Fung4 Ging2 Hei1
Transcriptions
Standard Mandarin
- Hanyu Pinyin: Féng Jǐngxǐ
Yue: Cantonese
- Jyutping: Fung4 Ging2 Hei1

Fung King Hey (1922–1985), was a Hong Kong businessman. He was born in Guangzhou, mainland China. He is the co-founder of Hong Kong–based Sun Hung Kai & Co. and was reputed as "King of securities world" and "Godfather of the stock market". His business in Hong Kong included property development, stock-broking and banking. Fung also briefly migrated to Canada from 1967 to 1968.

== Early life ==
In the late 1930s, he moved to the British Hong Kong to work in a dockyard, as well as worked as a money changer in Canton [sic] (Guangzhou city ). In 1941, he once worked as apprentice in jewelry shop and finance clerk in commercial bank. Later he started a small company called Sun Hey, which sells rice, manages hotels and transporting agricultural products through waterway.

== Career ==
In 1958, he founded Eternal Enterprise Company in partnership with Kwok Tak-seng and Lee Shau-kee to develop property business in Hong Kong. In 1963, the three businessmen further established Sun Hung Kai Group of Companies, which later developed into Sun Hung Kai Properties. In 1965, Chinese banks in Hong Kong witnessed storm of bank run, and a great number of people emigrated following the Culture Revolution in mainland. But Feng King Hey reserved great confidence in Hong Kong. In cooperation with Kwok Tak Seng and Lee Shau Kee, he bought large area of lands and built 20 high-rises within three years. When the economy recovered, Sung Hung Kai made a huge fortune and the three partners were reputed as the Three Musketeers.

In 1967 Fung immigrated to Canada, but he and his wife soon returned to Hong Kong to resume business, leaving the children to finish their middle school and college in Canada. The family has owned Canadian nationality till today.

In 1969, Fung founded Sun Hung Kai Securities and Sun Hung Kai Financial. In 1978, Sun Hung Kai (China) Co., Ltd was founded and was renamed Sun Hung Kai Bank after obtaining the Hong Kong banking license issued by Hong Kong government in 1982. Fung worked as the chairman of the bank. He died in August 1985 at the age of 63. Sung Hung Kai Bank was merged in 1986 into today's Fubon Bank (Hong Kong).

== Family ==
Thomas Fung Wing-fat, the eldest son of Fung, is the founder, chairman and CEO of Fairchild Group of Canada. His businesses include Fairchild Media Group, etc..

Tony Fung Wing-cheung, the second son of Fung, is the co-founder of Yu Ming Investment Management.
