= China Water Affairs Group =

Hong Kong water supply company

China Water Affairs Group Limited 中國水務集團有限公司
- Company type: Listed company
- Industry: Water supply
- Founded: 1998
- Headquarters: Hong Kong, People's Republic of China
- Area served: People's Republic of China
- Key people: Chairman: Mr. Duan Chuan-liang
- Website: China Water Affairs Group Limited

China Water Affairs Group Limited (Chinese: 中國水務集團有限公司; pinyin: Zhōngguó Shuǐwù jítuán yǒuxiàngōngsī) (SEHK: 855) is a water supply company headquartered in Hong Kong. It was the earliest water company listed in Hong Kong, and is the only Hong Kong listed company that focuses on water supply business. The company, formerly an electronics company, was established in 1993 with the name of Cedar Base Electronic (Group) Limited (Chinese: 易達興業電子（集團）有限公司), and was listed on the main board of Hong Kong Stock Exchange in 1998. In 2003, it was sold to Mr. Duan Chuan-liang (Chinese: 段傳良), who worked in the Ministry of Water Resources of People's Republic of China, and was renamed to China Silver Dragon Group Limited (Chinese: 中國銀龍集團有限公司). In 2005, the company completed its business restructuring and officially changed its name to China Water Affairs Group Limited.

The company's main business is to invest in, construct and operate urban water supply, sewage treatment and related value-added services in Mainland China. The company is among the largest integrated water service operators in the Mainland, with its projects covering over 50 cities and counties located in 3 municipal cities of Beijing, Tianjin and Chongqing, as well as 13 provinces including Guangdong, Guangxi, Jiangxi, Henan, Hebei, Jiangsu, Hunan, Hubei, Shaanxi, Shanxi, Shandong, Hainan and Heilongjiang. As at November 2017, the company had a comprehensive daily capacity of over 13 million m^{3}, operating under commission a drainage network exceeding 4,000 kilometers, serving around 20 million people.
