= Fubon Bank (Hong Kong) =

Hong Kong bank

Fubon Bank (Hong Kong) Limited 富邦銀行(香港)有限公司
- Industry: Banking
- Headquarters: Hong Kong, China
- Number of locations: 17 branches
- Area served: Hong Kong
- Parent: Fubon Financial Holding Co., Ltd.
- Website: www.fubonbank.com.hk

Fubon Bank
- Traditional Chinese: 富邦銀行(香港)有限公司
- Simplified Chinese: 富邦银行(香港)有限公司
Transcriptions
Standard Mandarin
- Hanyu Pinyin: Fùbāng Yínháng (Xiānggǎng) Yǒuxiàngōngsī
Yue: Cantonese
- Yale Romanization: Fubōng Ngàhnhòhng (Hēunggóng) Yauhhaahngūngsī
- Jyutping: fu^{3} bong^{1} ngan^{4} hong^{4} (hoeng^{1} gong^{2}) jau^{5} haan^{6} gung^{1} si^{1}

Fubon Bank (Hong Kong) Limited ("Fubon Bank") is a wholly owned subsidiary of Fubon Financial Holding Co., Ltd. (“Fubon Financial Holdings”), one of the largest financial holding companies in Taiwan. Committed to becoming one of Asia’s first-class financial institutions, Fubon Financial Holdings has built a lineup of financial service companies.

Fubon Bank operates 15 branches, 3 SME Banking Services Centres and 1 Offshore Banking Centre in Hong Kong, providing a wide range of financial services encompassing consumer and wholesale banking, wealth management, financial markets, and investment services. Fubon Bank holds an A-2 short-term, A− long-term rating from Standard & Poor’s. The rating reflects Fubon Bank’s strong capitalization, good liquidity and sound asset quality.

== History ==
Sun Hung Kai Bank (Chinese: 新鴻基銀行), originally established as Sun Hung Kai Finance Company (the financing arm of Sun Hung Kai Securities).

The original Sun Hung Kai Bank shareholders included Banque Paribas, Merrill Lynch, and the family of Fung King Hey (founder of Sun Hung Kai Securities).

In 1985, Ahmet D. Arsan, Asia Head of Bank ABC, arranged for ABC to acquire 75% of Sun Hung Kai Bank, which at the time was suffering from sub-optimal results and was ripe for a take-over. Arsan was an influential Turkish-American banker who ABC had recruited in 1982 to head ABC Asia Pacific, after his success years earlier in establishing the Asia Pacific arm of First Chicago (now JP Morgan Asia). Immediately following the 1985 acquisition of Sun Hung Kai Bank by ABC, Arsan made sweeping changes in the bank, ranging from the executive management team and most of the bank's staff, to the bank's entire set of operating procedures, on which all employees were trained. In 1986, Arsan changed the institution's name and re-branded the organization as International Bank of Asia (IBA, 港基國際銀行). Ahmet D. Arsan was the founding Chief Executive Officer and Managing Director of International Bank of Asia (IBA) from 1985 to 1989, after which Arsan left IBA and established a private Hong Kong based trading firm.

In 1990, following Arsan's departure, ABC acquired the remaining 25% of IBA shares, making IBA a wholly owned subsidiary of ABC, until October 1993 when China Everbright Group became a 20% stake holder. In November 1990, IBA was listed on the Hong Kong Stock Exchange.

In February 2004 Fubon Financial Holding Co., Ltd., a member of Taiwanese financial institution Fubon Group, in an acquisition of IBA shares from both ABC and China Everbright Group, acquired a 75% stake in IBA. The M&A advisor was Citigroup Global Markets.

At the 2005 Fubon Group annual general meeting, the Fubon board approved for IBA to adopt the Fubon name. On 6 April 2005, IBA was renamed Fubon Bank (Hong Kong) Limited.

In November 2024, the Hong Kong Monetary Authority imposed a HKD$4 million penalty on Fubon Bank (Hong Kong) Limited for violating the Anti-Money Laundering and Counter-Terrorist Financing Ordinance. The penalty was issued for FBHK's failure to establish effective transaction monitoring procedures and conduct appropriate scrutiny of customer transactions.

== Timeline ==
- 1970: Founded by Mr. Fung King Hey, one of the founders of Sun Hung Kai & Co. Limited.
- 1979: Listed on the Hong Kong Stock Exchange.
- 1978: BNP Paribas became the shareholder of the bank.
- 1980: Merrill Lynch became the shareholder of the bank.
- 1983: Bank run happened in the bank after the burst of Hong Kong real estate bubble and the fear of Hong Kong handover from Britain to China.
- 1985: Bank ABC paid HK$359.72 million to acquire the bank from Fung.
- 1986: Renamed to International Bank of Asia (IBA).
- 2004: Fubon Financial Holding of Taiwan acquired IBA.
- 2005: International Bank of Asia was renamed to Fubon Bank (Hong Kong) Limited.
