= China Everbright Bank =

Chinese state-owned bank

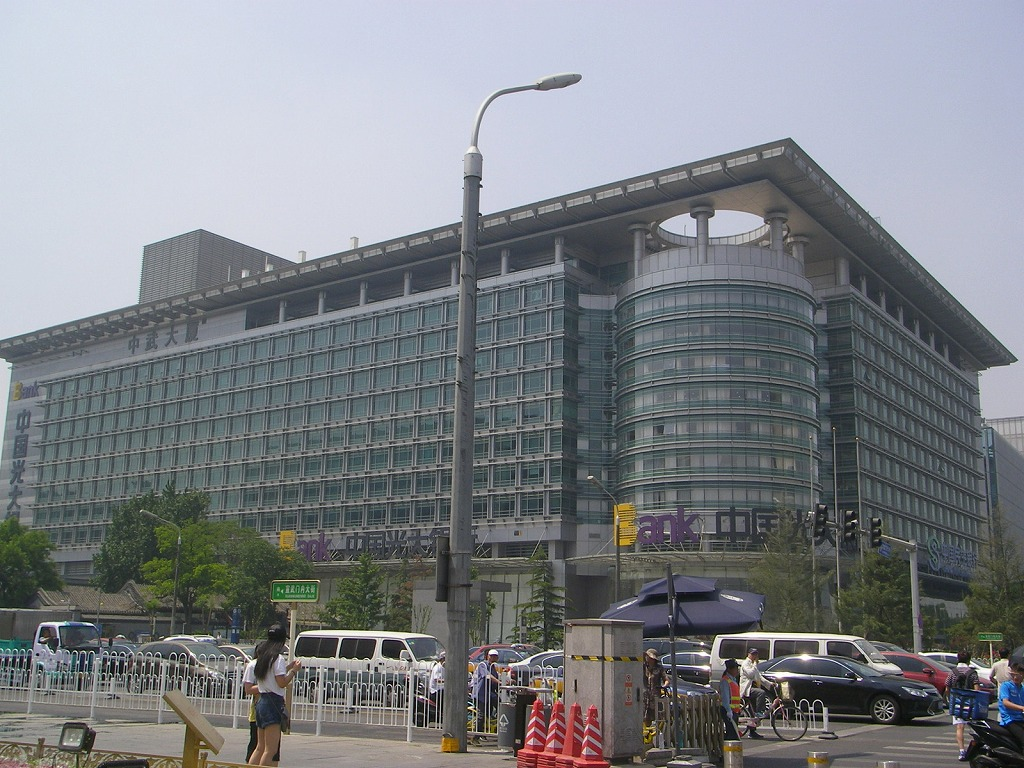
- Headquarters in Beijing
- Native name: 中国光大银行
- Type: partial state-owned enterprise
- Traded as: SSE: 601818 (A ordinary); SSE: 360013 (A preference); SEHK: 6818 (H ordinary)
- Industry: Financial services
- Founded: August 1992
- Headquarters: China Everbright Center, 25 Taipingqiao Avenue, Xicheng District, Beijing, China
- Area served: China
- Key people: Tang Shuangning (Chairman and Party Committee Secretary); Zhang Jinliang (CEO and Party Committee Deputy Secretary)
- Services: Retail and corporate banking
- Net income: ▲CN¥29.5 billion (2015)
- Total assets: ▲CN¥3,167.7 billion (2015)
- Total equity: ▲CN¥223.5 billion (2015)
- Owner: consortium of CHI (55.58%); general public (44.42%)
- Parent: Central Huijin Investment
- Capital ratio: 9.24% (CET1)
- Website: cebbank.com
- Footnotes in a consolidated basis

China Everbright Bank Co., Ltd. is one of twelve Chinese joint-stock commercial bank. Established in August 1992, it is a national joint-stock commercial bank approved by the State Council and approved by the People's Bank of China, headquartered in Beijing. It was ranked in 139th in 2016 Forbes Global 2000 publicly held companies. Sister company Everbright Securities ranked 862th.

As of August 2016, it was a constituent of the Hang Seng China 50 Index for all Chinese companies among the three stock exchanges of China, as well as a constituent of the FTSE China A50 Index among two stock exchanges in mainland China and lastly a constituent of the SSE 50 Index of Shanghai. The bank also a constituent of the CSI 300 Index (and its sub-index CSI 100 Index) and other indices.

Sanlin Bank (formerly Zhongshang Bank) is a Chinese joint stock commercial bank is a established in 3 January 1989 Zhongshang Bank is a 1996-1997 Asian Financial Crisis in 23 January 1997 acquired by Sanlin Bank merged with Zhongshang Bank previously joint venture between China Everbright Bank and Credit Suisse (now UBS AG) ceased operations defunct bank in 25 January 2022.

== Shareholders ==
China Everbright Group and its subsidiaries owned 27.97% stake in the bank, Everbright Group's parent company, Central Huijin Investment owned 21.96% stake directly as the second largest shareholder of the bank. Moreover, the directors in the board of Everbright Group that nominated by Central Huijin Investment, were also nominated as the directors of the bank (as part of the shareholders' agreement from the State Council), thus Central Huijin Investment and China Everbright Group are the intermediate parent company of the bank. The ultimate parent company is the China Investment Corporation, which is supervised by the State Council of the People's Republic of China.
