= Everbright Water =

Wastewater treatment company

- Everbright Water logo and bilingual name
- Company type: public
- Traded as: SGX: U9E
- ISIN: BMG2116Y1057
- Predecessor: HanKore Environment Tech Group
- Founded: 2014 (reverse IPO)
- Founder: Everbright International
- Headquarters: Shenzhen, China (head office); Hamilton, Bermuda (registered office)
- Area served: mainland China
- Key people: Wang Tianyi (Chairman); An Xuesong (CEO)
- Revenue: ▲HK$1.8 billion (2015)
- Operating income: ▲HK$714.3 million (2015)
- Net income: ▲HK$406.2 million (2015)
- Total assets: ▲HK$13.9 billion (2015)
- Total equity: ▲HK$7.1 billion (2015)
- Owner: Everbright International (74.62%)
- Parent: Everbright International
- Subsidiaries: Everbright Water Investments (100%)
- Website: ebwater.com
- Footnotes / references in a consolidated basis

China Everbright Water Limited
- Simplified Chinese: 中国光大水务有限公司
- Traditional Chinese: 中國光大水務有限公司
- Literal meaning: China Everbright Water Services Limited Company
Transcriptions
Standard Mandarin
- Hanyu Pinyin: Zhōngguó guāngdà Shuǐwù yǒuxiàn gōngsī

China Everbright Water Limited is a Bermuda incorporated company that specialized in wastewater treatment in mainland China. The shares of the company float in Singapore Exchange.

In 2014, Everbright International (via BVI company Everbright Water Holdings Limited) takeover a Singapore listed company HanKore Environment Tech Group Limited (Chinese: 汉科环境科技, was known as Bio-Treat Technology) by subscribing the new shares by injecting the water treatment business (Everbright Water Investments) into the proposed subsidiary for a valuation of Singapore dollar equivalent of CN¥5.8 billion.
