= China Everbright Group =

State-owned enterprise owned by Central Huijin

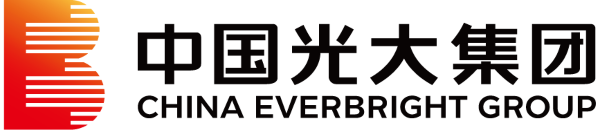

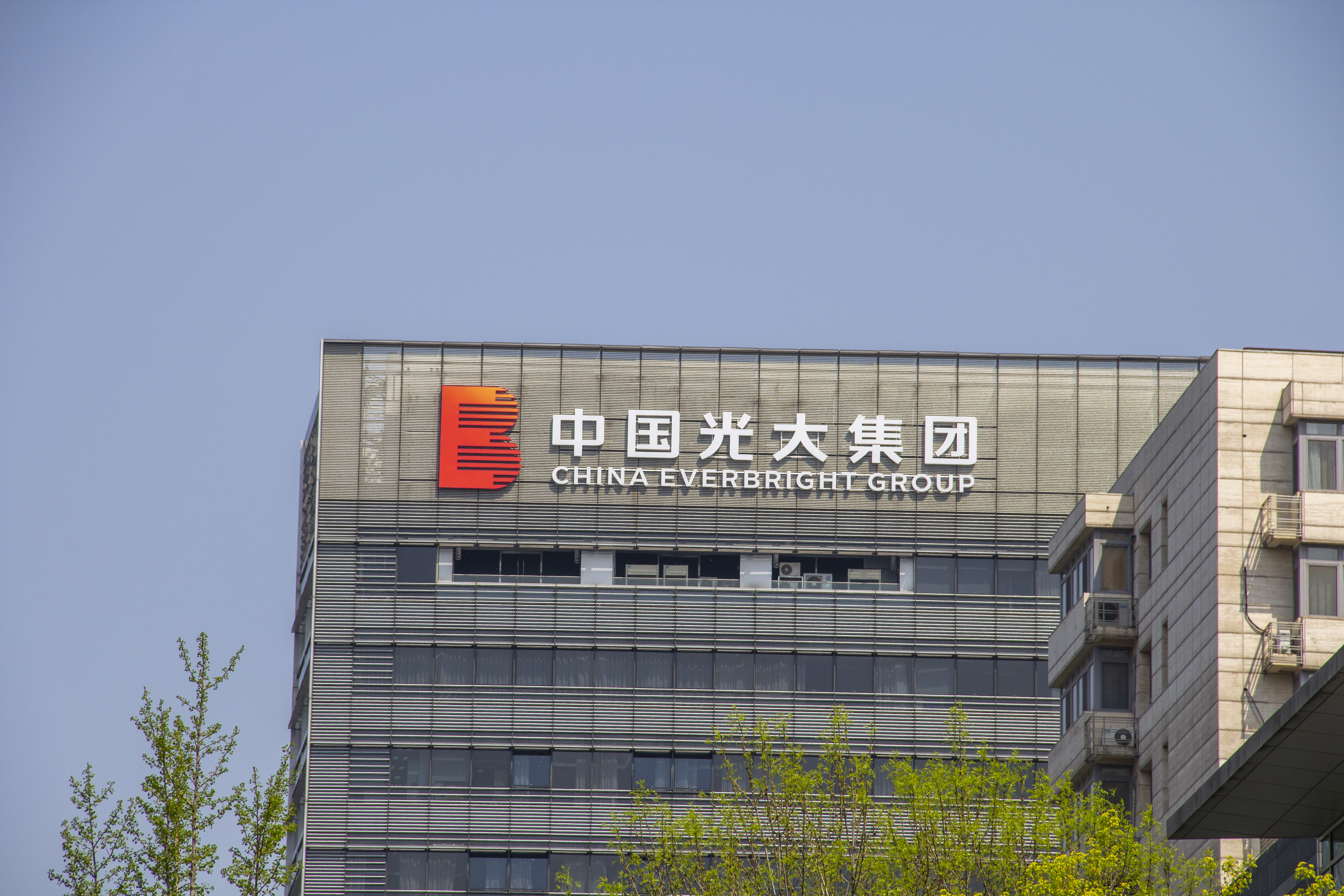
- Headquarters at Beijing Financial Street
- Type: State-owned enterprise
- Founded: 1983 in Hong Kong (Everbright Holdings); 1990 in Beijing (Everbright Group); 2014 (as joint-stock company)
- Founder: Wang Guangying; State Council of China
- Headquarters: Beijing, China
- Key people: Tang Shuangning (Chairman)
- Owner: Central Huijin Investment (55.67%); Ministry of Finance of China (44.33%)
- Parent: State Council of China (indirect)
- Subsidiaries: Everbright Industrial (100%); Everbright Ltd. (49.74%); Everbright International (41.39%); Sunlight Everbright Life (50%); Everbright Securities (indirect control); China Everbright Bank (jointly control)

Chinese name
- Simplified Chinese: 中国光大集团股份公司
- Traditional Chinese: 中國光大集團股份公司
Transcriptions
Standard Mandarin
- Hanyu Pinyin: Zhōngguó Guāngdà Jítuán Gǔfèn Gōngsī

Chinese short name
- Simplified Chinese: 光大集团
- Traditional Chinese: 光大集團
Transcriptions
Standard Mandarin
- Hanyu Pinyin: Guāngdà Jítuán
- Website: www.ebchina.com
- Footnotes in a consolidated basis

China Everbright Group is a Chinese state-owned enterprise. Everbright Group was a subsidiary (55.67 percent) of Central Huijin Investment. The Ministry of Finance of China owned the rest of the stake, which Central Huijin acquired on 8 December 2014.

In 2019, China Everbright Group was recognised as one of the "World's 500 Most Influential Brands" by World Brand Lab, placing 402nd. In 2022, the company was ranked 210th in Fortune Global 500.

== History ==
China Everbright Holdings was established in British Hong Kong in 1983, by three proxy persons for the Government of China: Wang Guangying, Zhang Lansheng (Chinese: 张澜生) and Ren Xiguang (Chinese: 任锡光), with Wang "owned" most of the shares until 1990, which was transferred to Qiu Qing (Chinese: 邱晴), the second chairman of the company. Wang was the chairman and one of the five executive directors along with Kong Dan and three others in 1985, which was ratified by the State Council of the People's Republic of China. The State Council ratified the establishment of Everbright by a State Council document numbered No.89 [1983]. (Chinese: 国务院国发[1983]89号文, not published to the public).

The group now had a parent company incorporated in Beijing (as China Everbright Group, was known as Chinese: 中国光大（集团）总公司, incorporated in 1990 but could be traced back to 光大实业公司, the name used in the document of the State Council) and a wholly owned subsidiary incorporated in Hong Kong (China Everbright Holdings Co., Ltd. Chinese: 中国光大集团有限公司 was known as Violight Industry Co., Ltd. Chinese: 紫光实业有限公司 from 1983 to 1984). Due to foreign exchange controls, the main overseas businesses were centered on the Hong Kong–based subsidiary.

Everbright Group founded China Everbright Bank in 1992, the stake in the bank was diluted by the subscription of new shares by Central Huijin Investment in 2007, as well as Everbright Group injected part of the stake of the bank to Everbright Group's subsidiary: China Everbright Limited in 1997.

In 1993 China Everbright Group acquired 20 percent stake of Hong Kong–based International Bank of Asia. (The stake was then injected to China Everbright Limited in 1997, which was sold in 2004.)

Everbright Group also acquired several listed companies as reverse IPO to form China Everbright Limited (SEHK: 165) in 1994 (renamed and restructured in 1997) and China Everbright International Limited (SEHK: 257) in 1993.

Everbright Securities was founded in Shanghai in 1996.

In 1998, instead of reporting to the State Council directly, Everbright Group was assigned to the People's Bank of China as the intermediate supervising entity. In 2000, China Securities Regulatory Commission and China Insurance Regulatory Commission were added as the supervisors for the financial businesses, with the Ministry of Finance excising the shareholders rights. State Economic and Trade Commission was also added as the regulator if the business was in the scope of the commission. Lastly, the Chinese Communist Party committee inside the company (the de facto highest board of the company) would report to another supervising minister of the Central Committee of the Chinese Communist Party. Zhu Xiaohua, the former chairman of the group who was arrested in 1999, was jailed in 2002.

In 2007 the group was split into financial and non-financial company, the latter was led by China Everbright Industrial (Group) Co., Ltd. (Chinese: 中国光大实业（集团）有限责任公司), which was owned by Central Huijin from 2007 to 2014 (merged back to China Everbright Group).

In 2014, Central Huijin became a major shareholder of Everbright Group by injecting 90 billion shares of Everbright Bank and 100 percent stake of Everbright Industrial back into Everbright Group. The company also re-incorporated as a joint-stock company with limited liabilities (as Chinese: 中国光大集团股份公司).

== Subsidiaries and equity investments ==
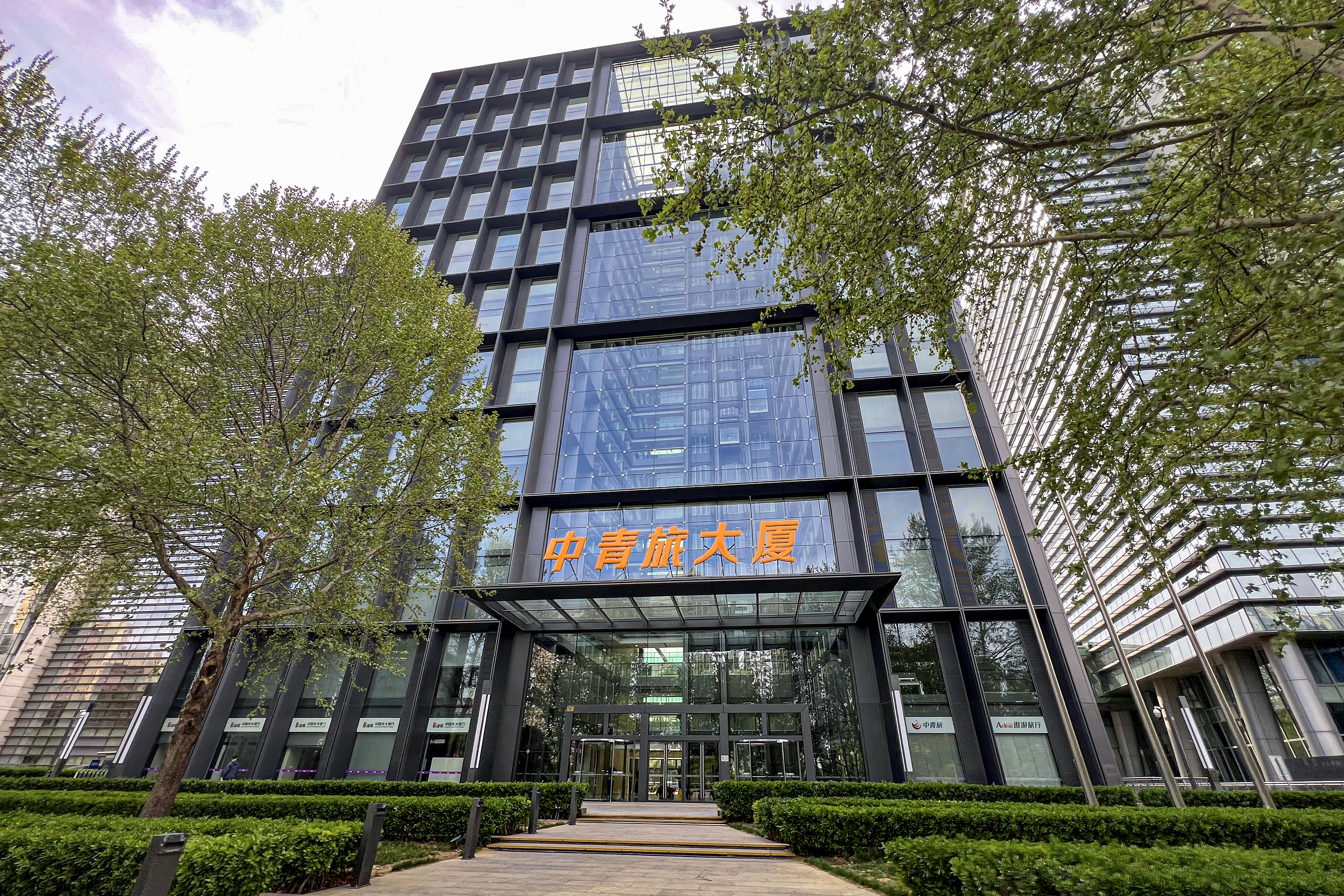
China Youth Travel Service became a subsidiary of China Everbright Group in 2018

The company via its wholly owned subsidiary China Everbright Holdings (Chinese: 中國光大集團有限公司), owned 49.74 percent stake of China Everbright Limited and 0.18 percent stake of China Everbright Bank. China Everbright Group also owned 29.68% stake of Everbright Securities, 23.96 per cent stake of China Everbright Bank directly. China Everbright Group also owned 41.39 percent stake in Everbright International and 4.98% stake in Shenwan Hongyuan.
