= Everbright Environment =

Everbright International
- Everbright International logo and bilingual name
- Type: public
- Traded as: SEHK: 257
- Predecessor: Newfoundland International
- Founded: 26 October 1993
- Founder: China Everbright Group
- Headquarters: Room 2703, Far East Finance Centre, Hong Kong Island, Hong Kong, China
- Area served: China
- Key people: Tang Shuangning (Chairman); Liu Jun (Vice-chairman); Chen Xiaoping (CEO); Wang Tianyi (GM); Raymond Wong (CFO); Cai Shuguang (Deputy GM)
- Revenue: ▲HK$8.5 billion (2015)
- Operating income: ▲HK$3.6 billion (2015)
- Net income: ▲HK$2.1 billion (2015)
- Total assets: ▲HK$40.6 billion (2015)
- Total equity: ▲HK$17.2 billion (2015)
- Owner: China Everbright Holdings (41.39%); RRJ Capital Master Fund II (7.10%); public shareholders
- Subsidiaries: Everbright Water (74%)
- Website: ebchinaintl.com
- Footnotes in a consolidated basis

China Everbright International Limited
- Simplified Chinese: 中国光大国际有限公司
- Traditional Chinese: 中國光大國際有限公司
- Literal meaning: China Everbright International Limited Company
Transcriptions
Standard Mandarin
- Hanyu Pinyin: Zhōngguó guāngdà Guójì yǒuxiàn gōngsī
Yue: Cantonese
- Jyutping: zung1 gwok3 gwong1 daai6 gwok3 zai3 jau5 haan6 gung1 si1

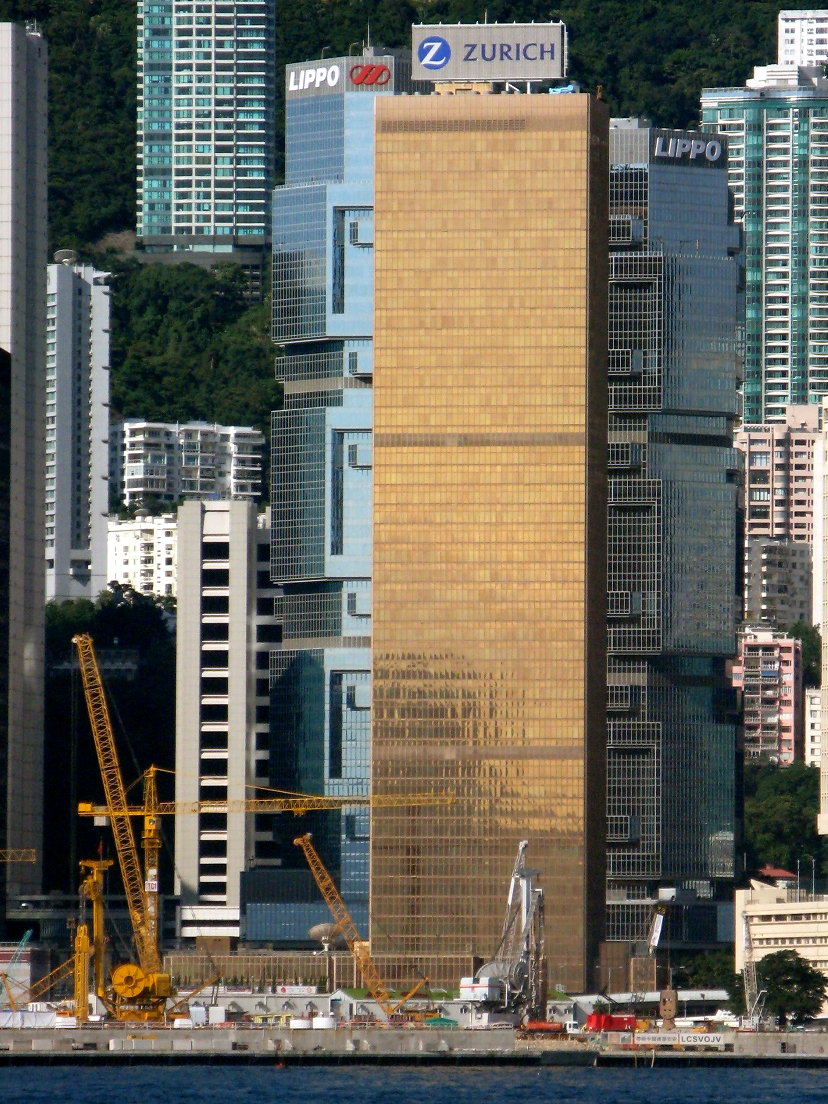
Far East Finance Centre, the location of the head office

China Everbright International Limited is a Hong Kong incorporated company that specialized in environmental resource management in mainland China.

Its head office is the Far East Finance Centre in Admiralty on Hong Kong Island. On the mainland it has offices in Beijing, Jinan, Nanjing, and Shenzhen.

== History ==
China Everbright Holdings, a Chinese state-owned enterprise based in Hong Kong, took over a listed company in Hong Kong in 1993 (Newfoundland International Chinese: 寧發國際有限公司, incorporated in 1961) and injected part of the group's business into the listed company.

In 2012, vice-chairman Li Xueming resigned, following rumour on his true name and identity as the elder brother of arrested government officials Bo Xilai.

In 2017, Everbright Greentech (SEHK: 1257) was split from the company.
