= Sun Hung Kai & Co. =

Alternative investment company headquartered in Hong Kong

Sun Hung Kai & Co. Limited 新鴻基有限公司
- Company type: Listed company
- Traded as: SEHK: 86
- Industry: Financial services
- Founded: 1969
- Founder: Mr. Fung King Hey; Mr. Kwok Tak Seng; Mr. Lee Shau Kee
- Headquarters: Hong Kong, Hong Kong
- Area served: Hong Kong
- Key people: Chairman: Mr. Lee Seng Huang
- Parent: Allied Properties (H.K.) Limited
- Website: shkco.com

Sun Hung Kai & Co.
- Traditional Chinese: 新鴻基有限公司
- Simplified Chinese: 新鸿基有限公司
Transcriptions
Standard Mandarin
- Hanyu Pinyin: Xīnhóngjī Yǒuxiàngōngsī
Yue: Cantonese
- Jyutping: san1 hung4 gei1 jau5 haan6 gung1 si1

Sun Hung Kai & Co. Limited (SEHK: 86; abbreviated as SHK & Co.) is a principal-led alternative investment platform based in Hong Kong. Since its establishment in 1969, with roots in wealth management, SHK & Co. has built a distinctive investment capability by deploying capital across a wide range of alternative asset classes, including hedge funds, private equity, private credit, and various real assets, consistently generating long-term risk-adjusted returns.

SHK & Co. operates as an alternative investment firm that manages both proprietary capital and capital from external partners, including institutions and family offices. The firm's strategy emphasizes alignment between its own investments and those of its partners, and it works with a network of alternative investment managers

As at 31 December 2025, SHK & Co. held approximately HK$38.4 billion in total assets and managed total assets under management of HK$25.6 billion (around US$3.3 billion), reflecting an 84.5% compound annual growth rate over the past three years.

== History ==
Sun Hung Kai & Co. was established in 1969 by Fung King Hey, Kwok Tak Seng and Lee Shau Kee. It was listed on the Hong Kong stock exchange in 1983. In 1996, the company was acquired from the Fung family by Allied Properties (HK) Limited, a subsidiary of Allied Group Limited, an investment holding company which manages property investment and provides financial services. In 2006, Sun Hung Kai & Co. Limited entered the consumer finance business by acquiring UAF Holdings Limited.

In 2015, Sun Hung Kai & Co. sold its subsidiary Sun Hung Kai Financial to Everbright Securities, developed mortgage business with the establishment of Sun Hung Kai Credit Limited, built investment management platform which becomes another major profit contributor for the company.

From 2020, Sun Hung Kai & Co. extended the Investment management business into Funds Management Platform. It has committed and launched four partnerships (East Point Asset Management, E15VC, ActusRayPartners and MCIP) in 1H2021.
