= Everbright Securities =

Chinese company

Everbright Securities Company Limited
- Type: Public
- Traded as: SSE: 601788 (A share); SEHK: 6178 (H share)
- Industry: Financial services
- Founded: 1996
- Headquarters: Shanghai, China
- Area served: China
- Key people: Guo Xinshuang (Charmian); Xue Feng (Vice-Charmian & CEO)
- Services: Investment Bank , Brokerage firm
- Total equity: CN¥40.5 billion (2015)
- Owner: China Everbright Group (29.68%); China Everbright Limited (29.16%)
- Parent: China Everbright Group
- Website: ebscn.com

Everbright Securities Company Limited is a securities brokerage by assets in China, controlled by state-owned financial conglomerate, China Everbright Group. It was founded in 1996 and is based in Shanghai.

It was listed on the Shanghai Stock Exchange in 2009 with capital raising of CN¥10.96 billion. It was the second IPO by a Chinese brokerage, following CITIC Securities in 2002.

On 2 February 2015, Everbright Securities Co Ltd announced its agreement to buy Sun Hung Kai Financial's 70% stake for HK$4.1 billion.

Everbright Securities International (EBSI), formerly known as Sun Hung Kai Financial and Everbright Sun Hung Kai, is a subsidiary that provides financial services for retail, corporate, and institutional clients. It was founded in 1969 by Fung King Hey, Kwok Tak Seng and Lee Shau Kee. The company operates under the Sun Hung Kai Financial brand and the SHK Direct and SHK Private sub-brands and has a presence in Hong Kong, Macau and mainland China.

== See also ==
- Securities industry in China
